= Aontas na Mac Léinn in Éirinn =

National students' union of Ireland

Aontas na Mac Léinn in Éirinn (AMLÉ)
- President: Daniel Walsh
- Founded: 1959
- Headquarters: Dublin, Ireland
- International affiliation: European Students' Union
- Website: www.amle.ie

Aontas na Mac Léinn in Éirinn (AMLÉ), formerly known as the Union of Students in Ireland (USI), is the national representative body for third-level students in Ireland, being an confederal organisation consisting of third-level students' unions. Founded in 1959, it represents more than 374,000 students in over forty colleges across the island of Ireland.

Former presidents of the organisation include former Tánaiste Eamon Gilmore (1976–1978), former Chief Justice John L. Murray (1966–1967), and broadcaster Joe Duffy (1983–1984).

In May 2025, the organisation officially changed name from its original English title, the Union of Students in Ireland (USI), to its Irish language name, Aontas na Mac Léinn in Éirinn (AMLÉ), following the passing of a constitutional amendment at its 2025 Comhdháil.

== Organisation ==
The organisation's ultimate governing body is its annual Comhdháil (Congress), consisting of delegates from all of its member organisations. Its executive body meanwhile is Comhairle Náisiúnta (National Council), which meets approximately every six weeks and comprises one voting member from each member organisation, along with non-voting members. Day-to-day operations meanwhile are carried out by the Coiste Gnó (Executive Committee), full-time officers elected at Comhdháil from member organisations. The Coiste Gnó consists of 11 full-time officers, namely a President, Vice Presidents for Campaigns, Academic Affairs, Welfare, Equality & Citizenship, Gaeilge (Irish Language), Postgraduate Affairs, a Vice President for each of the regions (Southern, Border Midlands West and Dublin), along with the NUS-USI President (elected at NUS-USI conferences).

In Northern Ireland, AMLÉ jointly operates NUS-USI with the National Union of Students of the United Kingdom, under the so-called "Trilateral Agreement", with students being members of both national unions. AMLÉ is a member of European Students' Union and Eurodoc, and has provided officer-holders in both organisations.

== Member organisations ==
AMLÉ member organisations (students' unions), pay an affiliation fee to fund the national union, proportional to their student populations. Many of these unions were merged from smaller unions in institutes of technology, prior to the creation of technological universities, although not all students' unions of such institutes have merged.

University of Limerick Student Life (formerly University of Limerick Students' Union) has not been a member of AMLÉ since the 1990s.

Students' Union Name	Higher Education Institution
NUS-USI Region
Belfast Metropolitan College Students' Union (BMCSU)	Belfast Metropolitan College
College of Agriculture, Food and the Rural Economy Students' Union (CAFRESU)	College of Agriculture, Food and the Rural Economy
Northern Regional College Students' Union (NRCSU)	Northern Regional College
North West Regional College Students' Union (NWRCSU)	North West Regional College
Queen's University Belfast Students' Union (QSU)	Queen's University Belfast
South Eastern Regional College Students' Union (SERCSU)	South Eastern Regional College
Southern Regional College Students' Union (SRCSU)	Southern Regional College
South West College Students' Union (SWCSU)	South West College
St Mary’s University College Belfast Students' Union (SMUCBSU)	St Mary's University College
Stranmillis University College Belfast Students' Union (SUCBSU)	Stranmillis University College
Ulster University Students' Union (UUSU)	Ulster University
Dublin Region	
Dublin City University Students' Union (DCUSU)	Dublin City University
Institute of Art, Design and Technology Students' Union (IADTSU)	Institute of Art, Design and Technology
National College of Art and Design Students' Union (NCADSU)	National College of Art and Design
National College of Ireland Students' Union (NCISU)	National College of Ireland
Technological University Dublin Students' Union (TUDSU)	Technological University Dublin
Trinity College Dublin Students' Union (TCDSU)	Trinity College Dublin
University College Dublin Students' Union (UCDSU) (Note: Re-affiliated in 2025, following a period of being unaffiliated.)	University College Dublin
Southern Region	
Burren College of Art Students' Union (BCASU) (Note: Formed and affiliated simultaneously in 2025.)	Burren College of Art
Carlow College Students' Union (CCSU)	Carlow College
Munster Technological University Students' Union (MTUSU)	Munster Technological University (Cork and Kerry campuses) (Note: The students' unions of the MTU Cork and Kerry campuses merged in 2026.)
South East Technological University Students' Union (SETUSU)	South East Technological University
Technological University of the Shannon Students' Union (TUDSU)	Technological University of the Shannon
University College Cork Students' Union (UCCSU)	University College Cork
Border, Midlands and Western (BMW) Region
Atlantic Technological University Students' Union (ATUSU)	Atlantic Technological University (Donegal, Galway, Mayo, Sligo and St. Angela's campuses) (Note: The students' unions of the ATU campuses merged in 2026.)
Comhaltas na Mac Léinn Ollscoil na Gaillimhe (CMLOG) (University of Galway Students' Union) (Note: The students' union of the University of Galway primarily uses its Irish name.)	University of Galway
Dundalk Institute of Technology Students' Union (DKITSU)	Dundalk Institute of Technology
Maynooth Students' Union (MSU)	Maynooth University

== Notable former members ==
=== Notable past officers ===
Former logo of USI, replaced by a new logo in 2010

Chief Justice John L. Murray was the organisation's president in 1966/67 and broadcaster Joe Duffy held the post in 1983–84. Several Irish politicians also started their careers as presidents of the organisation, including former Labour Party leaders Pat Rabbitte and Eamon Gilmore, and former chairman of the Labour Party, Colm Keaveney. Laura Harmon was president from 2014 to 2015, being the first female president in 20 years, later becoming a Cork City Councillor and a member of Seanad Éireann on the Industrial and Commercial Panel. Annie Hoey held the post from 2016 to 2017 and became the first former female president to be elected to national office during the 2020 Seanad election as the Irish Labour Party candidate for the Agricultural Panel.

Political strategist Frank Flannery, Cambridge University and Yale Professor Denys Turner all served as president, while SDLP Leader Mark Durkan was Deputy President. Alex White TD served on the organisation's officer board. Broadcaster and journalist Howard Kinlay was the first president of the Students Union in TCD before becoming president of AMLÉ. The chain of student hostels owned by the organisation were called Kinlay House in his honour. Chief executive of the Labour Relations Commission, Kieran Mulvey, was president of the UCD Students Union and later deputy president of AMLÉ. Heledd Fychan, serving as Welsh Cabinet Minister for Culture and Sport since 2026 and as a member of the Senedd since 2021 served as Education Officer of AMLÉ.

=== Other members ===
Other figures that have been involved in the student movement but did not hold elected positions in the national union include the ninth President of Ireland Michael D. Higgins (President of the Students' Union in National University of Ireland, Galway (NUI Galway), Supreme Court Justice Adrian Hardiman (President of the Students' Union in University College Dublin), Stormont Minister for the Environment Alex Attwood MLA (President of the Students' Union in Queen's University Belfast), former Minister Séamus Brennan TD (Secretary of the Students' Union in UCG), Labour Senator Ivana Bacik (President of the Students' Union in TCD), Independent Senator Rónán Mullen (President of the Students Union in UCG), Socialist Party TD Clare Daly (President of the Students Union in Dublin City University), Fianna Fáil TD Charlie McConalogue (Vice President of the Students' Union in UCD) and Senator Averil Power (President of the Students' Union in TCD). While Averil Power was president, former Fine Gael TD Lucinda Creighton was active in the student movement, although she never held elected office herself.

Former Fianna Fáil senator James Carroll was education officer and later president of the Students' Union in UCD; and Mayor of Derry Martin Reilly was a sabbatical officer in Queen's. Jemma Dolan, Sinn Féin MLA for Fermanagh and South Tyrone was vice president for Campaigns and Communications for the University of Ulster Students Union. Political activist and victim of the miscarriage of justice after the Sallins Train Robbery, Osgur Breatnach, was a member of the Students' Representative Council of UCDSU. Irish Ambassador to the United Kingdom Dan Mulhall was deputy president of the Students Union in University College Cork. Aviation Regulator Cathal Guiomard and Central Bank of Ireland Commissioner Neil Whorisky were both Presidents of UCGSU. The debt relief activist and campaigner David Hall was vice-president of the Students' Union in Maynooth in the 1990s.

Nick Ross was deputy president at Queen's Students' Union, Ryan Tubridy was involved in UCD Students' Union, Morning Ireland presenter Aine Lawlor was president of the Students Union in TCD as was fellow RTÉ journalist and presenter Mark Little, while broadcaster and journalist Mary Raftery held Students' Union positions in a number of Colleges, culminating in a term as Education Officer in UCD Students' Union, where she was the first full-time female officer in the Students' Union. Eugene Murray, editor of Today Tonight and later head of TV Current Affairs with RTÉ was President of TCD SU in 1971. In 2020 the organisation's deputy president, Michelle Byrne, resigned following undercover reporting by a right wing student publication 'The Burkean'.
