= Galway-Mayo Institute of Technology =

Former higher educational institution in Galway, Ireland

Coordinates: 53.277755°N 9.010586°W

- Institúid Teicneolaíochta na Gaillimhe-Maigh Eo
- Former name: Regional Technical College Galway
- Type: Public
- Active: 1971–April 2022
- Affiliations: Atlantic Technological University; European University Association
- Chair: Cormac Mac Donncha
- President: Orla Flynn
- Students: 12,000
- Location: Galway, Connacht, Ireland
- Colours: Sky blue and maroon
- Website: www.gmit.ie

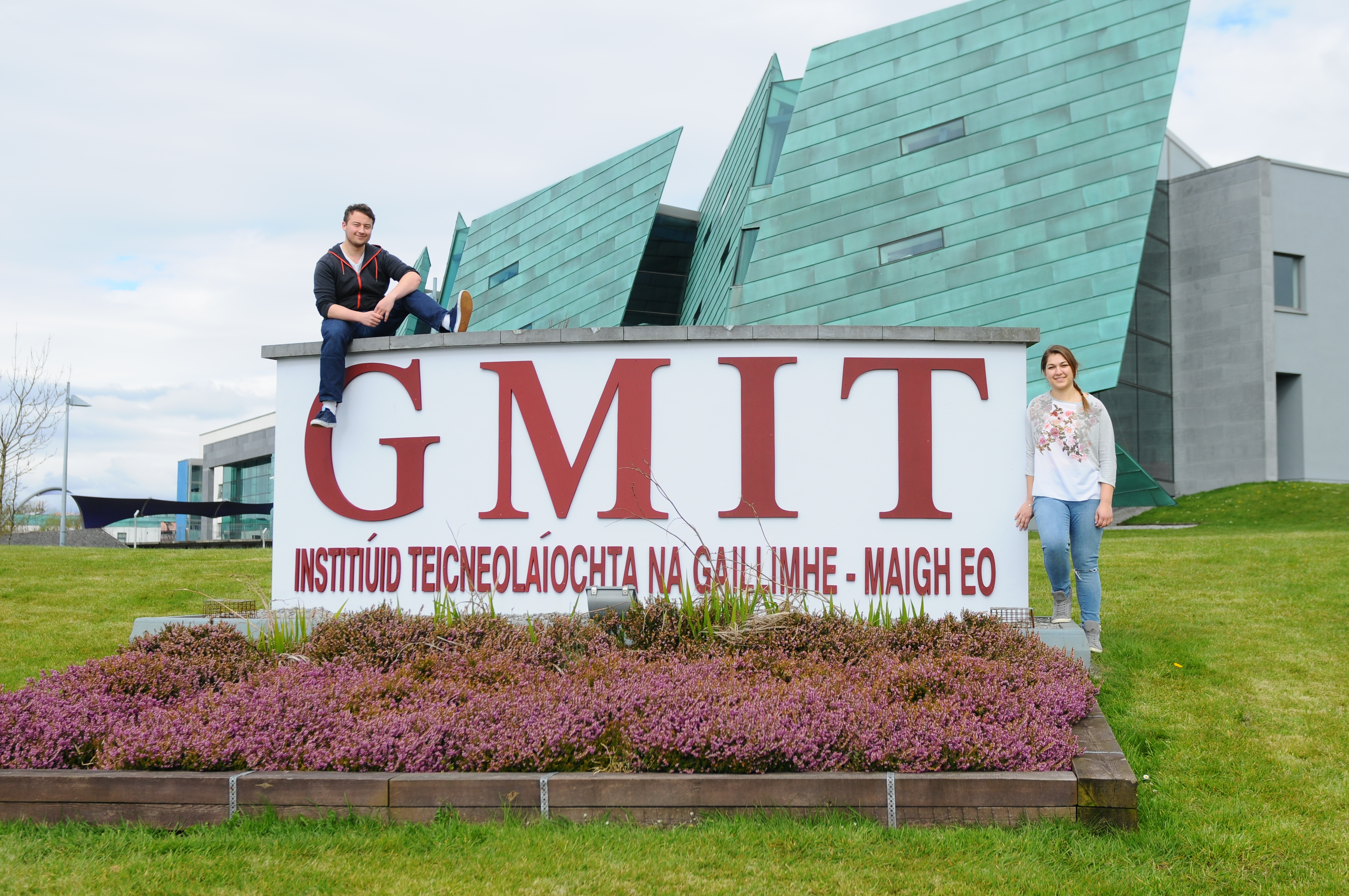
GMIT Galway campus, Dublin Road, Galway

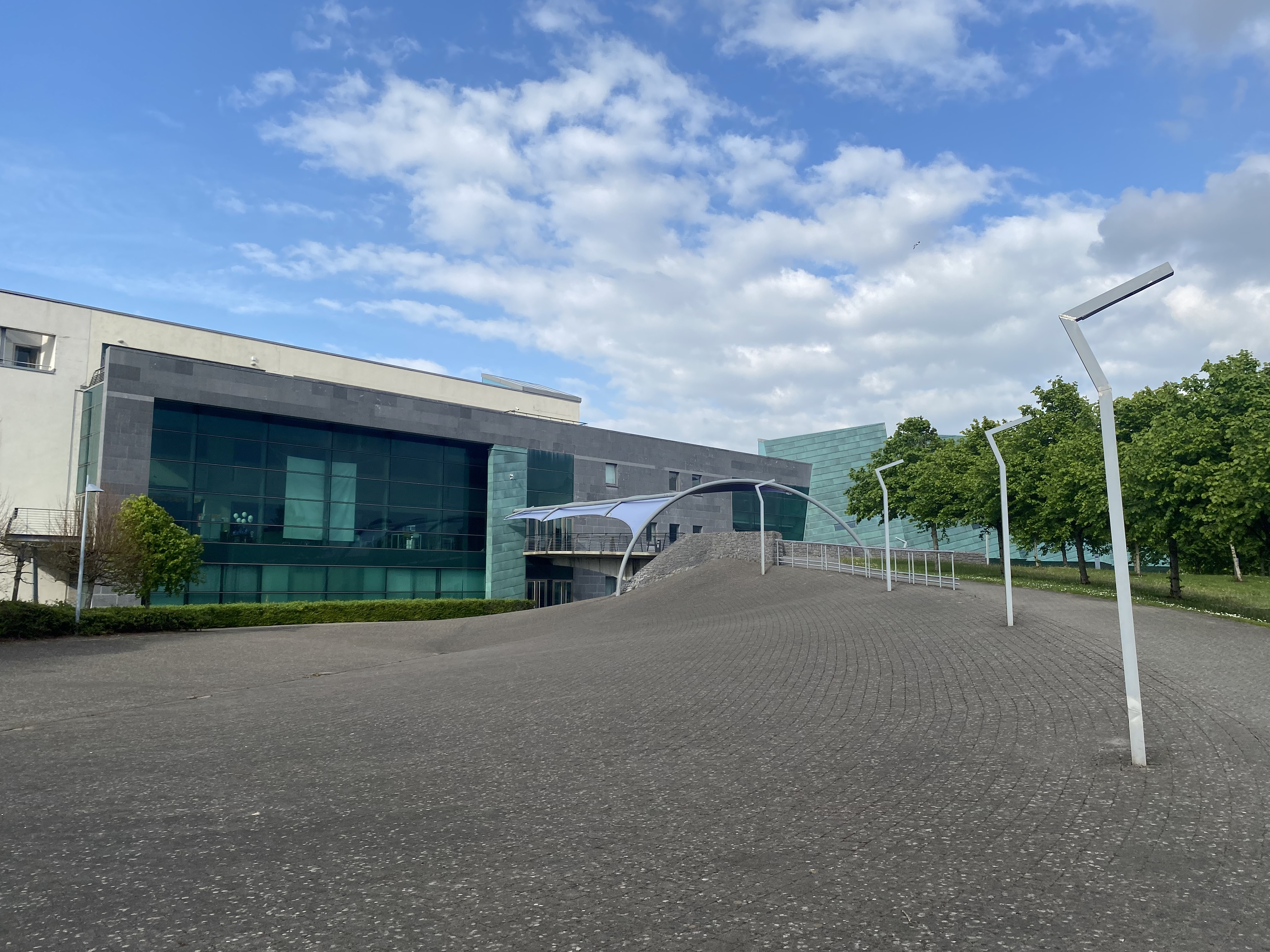

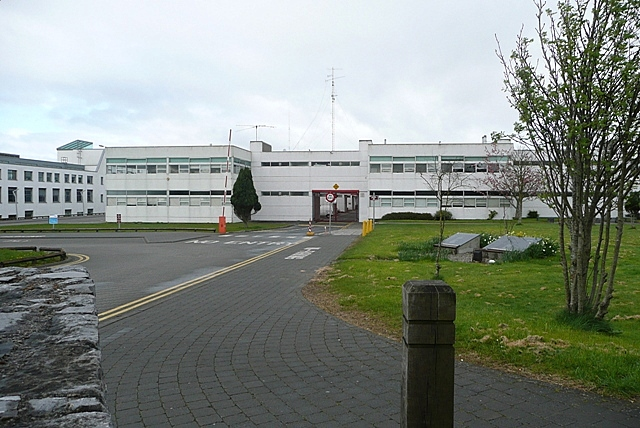

The Galway-Mayo Institute of Technology (GMIT; Irish: Institúid Teicneolaíochta na Gaillimhe-Maigh Eo) was an institute of technology, located in Galway, Ireland. In April 2022, it was formally dissolved, and its functions were transferred to Atlantic Technological University (ATU). Now a constituent institute of ATU, it has facilities in the west of Ireland. GMIT's campuses are located in Galway City, Castlebar, Letterfrack and Mountbellew. GMIT won The Sunday Times Institute of Technology of the Year award in 2004, 2007, 2015 and 2022. GMIT also has a number of specialist research centres and two Innovation Hubs (in Galway and Mayo).

== History ==
The institute was founded in 1973 as Regional Technical College Galway.

In 1975, the first bachelor's degree course was approved at a regional technical college, and by May 1977 the first degrees were conferred, a B.A. in Hotel and Catering Management.

In the 1980s it developed partnerships with other educational providers in the region including the Franciscan Agricultural College, Mountbellew (established 1904) and Connemara West in Letterfrack. In 1994 it opened a campus at Castlebar, County Mayo (the former St. Mary's Hospital, Castlebar) and at Cluain Mhuire in Galway city. Galway RTC like other regional technical colleges gained autonomy in 1992. In 1997 the college was renamed Galway-Mayo Institute of Technology.

=== Presidents of GMIT ===
In December 2019, Dr. Orla Flynn was appointed president of GMIT, succeeding, Dr. Fergal Barry who was appointed in 2015 and resigned, in May 2019. Previous presidents (or directors or principals as the post was previously called) of the college include Michael Carmody (2012–2015), and Marion Coy (2002–2011). Dr. Gay Corr was head of GMIT from its foundation as Galway RTC in 1972 until 2002.

== Buildings and sites ==
=== Galway campus ===
GMIT Galway campus was based on the Dublin Road in the Ballybane suburb of Galway city, overlooking Galway Bay. It was the administrative headquarters for the institute and has four schools of study; the School of Business, the School of Engineering, the School of Science & Computing, and Galway International Hotel School.

Also located at this campus were the Innovation Hub, the Lifelong Learning Centre and the Research, Development & Innovation Centre.

=== Centre for Creative Arts and Media (CCAM) ===
GMIT's Centre for Creative Arts and Media (CCAM) was located a mile from the main campus on the Monivea Road. It was based in an old Redemptorist Monastery and is now the location of an Art, Design and Media college.

It offered undergraduate courses in design, contemporary arts, film & documentary, textiles and fine art. In 2016, it introduced post-graduate courses in Creative Practice to support artists, designers and filmmakers.

The annual graduate exhibitions and screenings showcased the work being produced throughout the academic year.

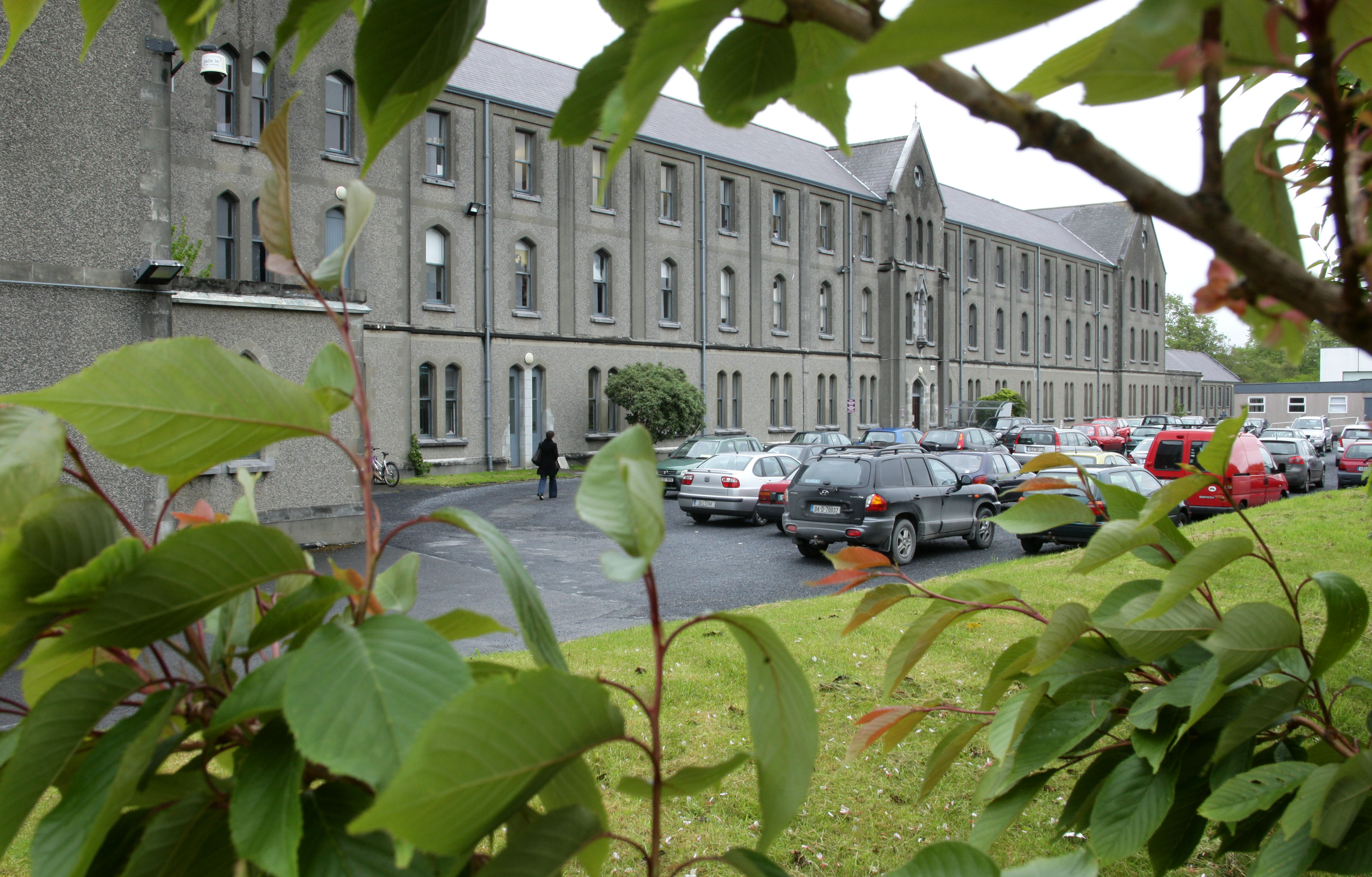
GMIT Centre for Creative Arts and Media, Galway City

=== Mayo campus ===
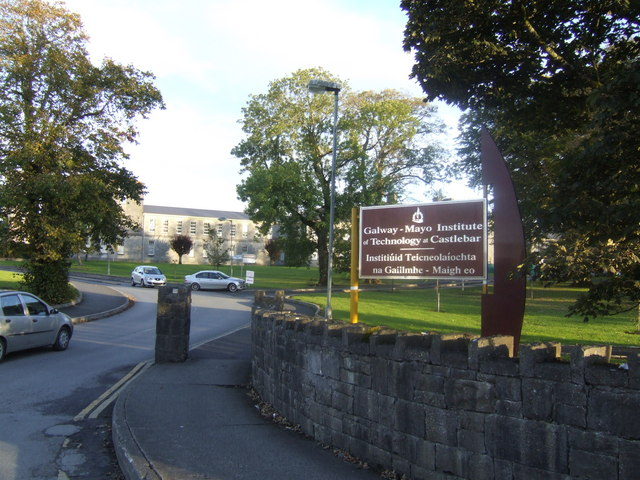
Campus building in Castlebar, originally built as St. Mary's Hospital in 1866.

GMIT Mayo campus was located at Castlebar on approximately 20 hectares of land.

Degree courses that were on offer included business, engineering, humanities, nursing and social care, and technology. GMIT Mayo campus also offered a wide range of Lifelong Learning courses, and had an Innovation Hub to support entrepreneurs and start-up businesses.

=== Letterfrack campus ===
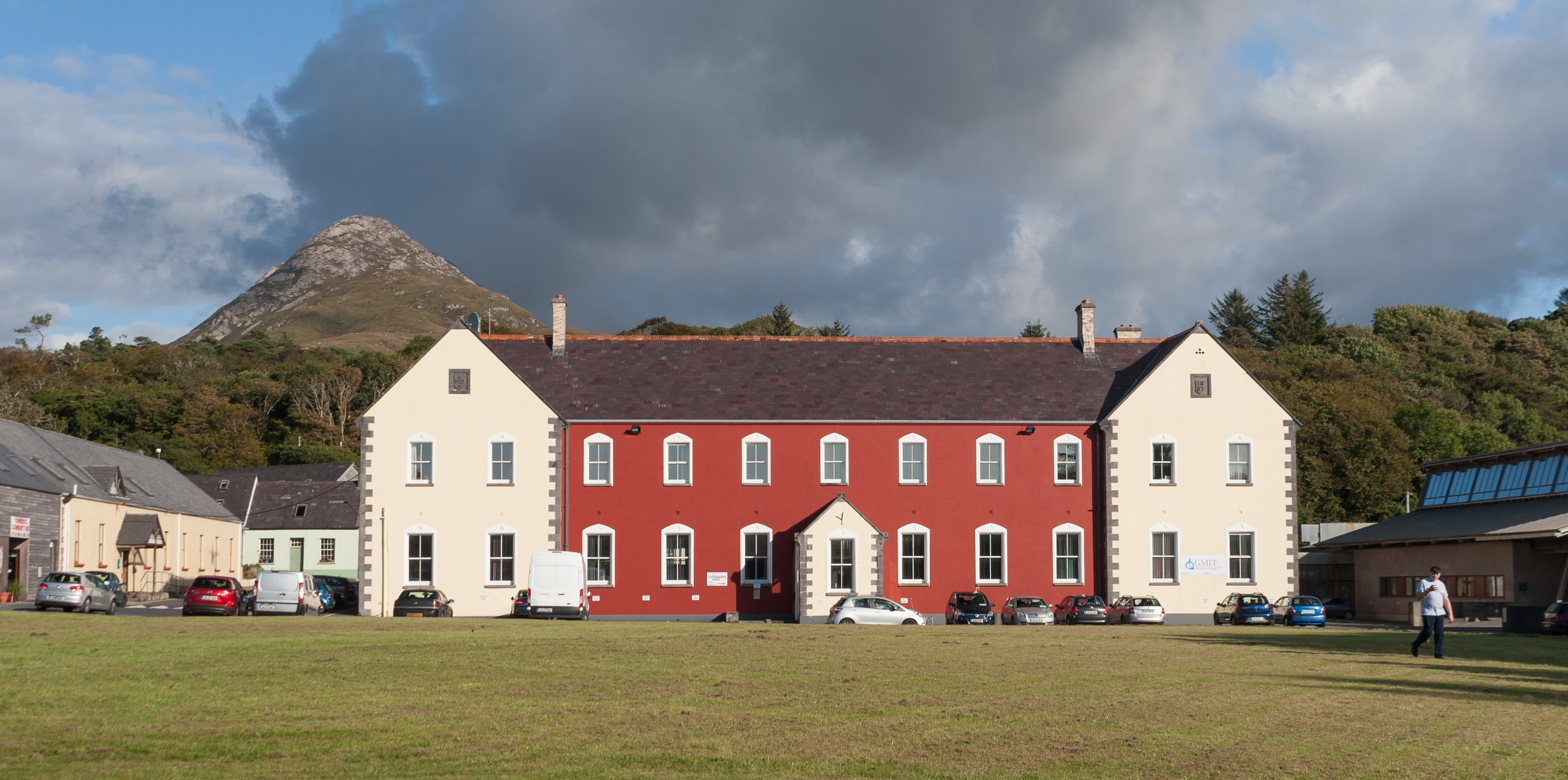
Campus building in Letterfrack, originally built as St Joseph's Industrial School in 1887 after the designs of the Cavan architect William Hague.

GMIT Letterfrack campus was the National Centre of Excellence for Furniture Design and Wood Technology, and had been involved with the study of furniture design since 1987.

It offered degree courses in furniture design and manufacture, furniture and wood technology, and teacher education (construction studies and DCG). The campus was located in Connemara in County Galway.

=== Mountbellew campus ===
Mountbellew was the first agricultural college in Ireland, set up by the Franciscan Brothers in 1904. The original college was demolished in 1971 and replaced with the new building in 1975. In 1986, the Franciscan Brothers Agricultural College established a link with GMIT to deliver a Higher Certificate in Business Studies (Agribusiness).

Previously, GMIT students in Mountbellew could choose between three types of degree (Agri-Business, Agri-Science or Agri-Engineering) and spend time between the Mountbellew and Galway campuses.

== Atlantic Technological University ==
With alliances made in 2012, by 2015, GMIT, along with IT Sligo and Letterkenny IT, submitted a formal Expression of Interest to the Higher Education Authority (HEA) for re-designation as a Technological University. This partnership, known as the Connacht-Ulster Alliance (CUA), aims to establish a Technological University of Western & Northwestern Ireland and was still in the planning stage in October 2018.

The plan was a tenet of the GMIT strategic plan 2019 – 2023.

The CUA planned to make a formal application in 2021, with a TU beginning operations in 2022. In October 2020, the constituent IT's were allocated over €5.5 million towards transformation.

On 28 October 2021, an announcement was made by the Minister for Further and Higher Education, Research, Innovation and Science, Simon Harris, TD, that together GMIT, LYIT and IT Sligo were approved for designation as a Technological University (TU).

On 23 November 2021, it was announced that the name of the new TU would be Atlantic Technological University (ATU). ATU was formally established on 1 April 2022.

== GMIT Innovation Hubs – Galway and Mayo ==
Galway-Mayo Institute of Technology (GMIT) established two Innovation Hubs (iHubs) at its Galway and Mayo campuses in 2005 and 2006 respectively with support from Enterprise Ireland.

These iHubs provided a range of start-up spaces and a portfolio of Business Development Supports to start-up enterprises. The iHubs also provided a number of Entrepreneur Development Programmes including ‘New Frontiers’ (Enterprise Ireland's national entrepreneur development programme for innovative, early stage start-ups), and ‘Empower’ – a dedicated entrepreneurship programme for women, sponsored by the European Social Fund and Department of Justice and Equality.

GMIT planned to double the size of its iHub building at the Galway campus following successful funding approval from Enterprise Ireland, which was officially announced in May 2017.

The proposed extension would have increased the floor space of the iHub to circa 2,400 square metres from its current 1,150 square metres. The extended Galway iHub would have provided space for over 40 incubation start-ups including dedicated space for MedTech enterprises, Digital Tech start-ups, a co-working space, an Entrepreneurship Hub, social and events space.

== Student life ==
Clubs and Societies at GMIT aimed to promote community, personal development and student involvement.

=== Clubs ===
GMIT offered a diverse range of more than 30 different sports clubs.

Clubs had achieved notable national and international success in recent years: Senior Hurling Cup Champions (2019), Boxing Intervarsity Champions (2019), Fresher Hurling League & Championship Winners, GMIT Ladies Soccer – Division 1 Cup Champions (2019), Equestrian – Dressage Category champions (2019), Ladies Football – Donaghy Cup Champions (2019), Cheerleading – International World Champions at the UCA College World Championship in Orlando Florida.

==== Clubs that were available for students ====
• Airsoft Club • Cricket Club • Ladies Soccer • Rowing • Athletics Club • Equestrian Club • Mens Rugby • Cheerleading

• Archery Club • Ladies Football • Sub Aqua Club • Ultimate Frisbee

• Badminton Club • Fresher Hurling • Mens Soccer • Hockey • Men's Basketball • Ladies Basketball • Ladies Volleyball • Ladies Rugby

• Boxing • Senior Hurling • Mens Volleyball • Handball • Camogie • Karate Club • Sailing • Swim • Cricket Club • Kayak Club • Surf • Kickboxing

=== Societies ===
Societies at GMIT gave students a chance to explore and participate in interests they might not encounter in their studies.

==== Societies that were available for students ====
• African • Comedy • Engineering • LGBT • Art • Habitat for Humanity • Fianna Fáil • Marketing • Agri Business • Heritage • Film & TV • Music • Anime & Manga • International • Fine Gael • Nutrition • Best Buddies • Debating • First Aid • Photography • Business • Digital Media • Gaisce • Radio • Chemistry • DJ • Gaming • Sculpture • Choir • Eco Soc • Irish Soc • Sign Language • GMIT Student Managed Investment Fund (www.gmitsmf.com)

== Students Union ==
The Students Union at GMIT aimed to represent students on all levels, throughout the institute, from class reps attending SU council and Programme boards to full-time sabbatical officers serving students on Governing Body and Academic Council. The Student Union supported students with a wide range of academic, social, welfare and financial issues. Their website was www.gmitsu.ie

== GMIT Healthy Campus ==
Healthy Campus was a cross-campus working group, consisting of staff and students, which had signed up to the Healthy Ireland Healthy Campus initiative. Amongst other activities, their previous five target areas for development were: • Introducing a "Clean Air – No Smoking or Vaping Campus" on 01/01/2020 • Positive Mental Health & Wellbeing Initiatives • The Introduction of a Nutrition Traffic Lights System in the canteen • Supporting students with Alcohol, Drugs and Tobacco reduction/safer use. • The delivery of Consent workshops to all first-year students.

== International students ==
GMIT welcomed more than 40 different nationalities represented across five campuses, and offered international students:

- A first-class education
- An English-speaking environment
- A rich European and Irish cultural experience

== Graduation ==
As a multi-campus institution, annually GMIT hosted its graduation ceremonies separately for its Galway, Letterfrack and Mayo graduates. The 2019 conferring took place in GMIT Letterfrack, Galmont Hotel, Galway and Royal Theatre, Castlebar, Mayo.

== Notable alumni ==
- Mark Boyle (born 1979), Irish writer best known for living without money from November 2008
- Robert Sheehan (born 1988), Irish actor
- Brian Walsh (born 1972), Irish politician
- Fintan Warfield (born 1992), Irish politician
- Jennifer Whitmore, Irish politician

== Controversy ==
In December 2020, videos began circulating on social media of two women lecturers insulting their students, with many identified by name. GMIT president Orla Flynn apologised for the "data breach" and said "and some of the comments made by our staff do not reflect the values to which we aspire"; she did not apologise publicly for the conduct of the women lecturers but said GMIT would apologise directly.

Also in December 2020, a Freedom of Information request revealed that GMIT had spent €5,217 investigating claims of sexual harassment.

== See also ==
- Education in the Republic of Ireland
