= Atlantic Technological University =

Technological university based in Ireland

Coordinates: 53.277755°N 9.010586°W

- Ollscoil Teicneolaíochta an Atlantaigh
- Logo of Atlantic TU
- Other names: ATU, OTA, Atlantic TU
- Predecessors: Galway-Mayo Institute of Technology; Institute of Technology, Sligo; Letterkenny Institute of Technology
- Type: Public technological university
- Academic affiliations: EUA; UI; EUt+
- Chairperson: Maura McNally SC
- President: Dr Orla Flynn
- Total staff: 2,253
- Students: 20,418
- Undergraduates: 86%
- Postgraduates: 14%
- Location: Connacht and Ulster, Ireland
- Campus: Multiple; Galway; Castlebar; Sligo; Letterkenny; Killybegs; Letterfrack; Mountbellew
- Colours: Teal, navy and purple
- Website: atu.ie

Atlantic Technological University (also known as Atlantic TU or ATU; Irish: Ollscoil Teicneolaíochta an Atlantaigh; OTA) is a technological university in the west and north-west of Ireland. It was formally established on 1 April 2022 as a merger of three existing institutes of technology (ITs) – Galway-Mayo IT, IT Sligo, and Letterkenny IT – into a single university, the fourth such TU in Ireland.

== History ==
With alliances made in 2012, by 2015, Galway-Mayo IT (GMIT), along with IT Sligo and Letterkenny IT (LYIT), submitted a formal Expression of Interest to the Higher Education Authority (HEA) in the Republic of Ireland for re-designation as a Technological University. This partnership, known as the Connacht-Ulster Alliance (CUA), aimed to establish a 'Technological University' in the West of Ireland and County Donegal, a county in Ulster in the north of Ireland, and was in the planning stage in October 2018.

The plan was a tenet of the GMIT strategic plan 2019 – 2023.

The CUA planned to make a formal application in 2021, with a TU beginning operations in 2022. In October 2020, the constituent IT's were allocated over €5.5 million towards transformation.

Formal approval was granted in October 2021 by Simon Harris, Minister for Further and Higher Education, Research, Innovation and Science, with a launch date in April 2022. In November 2023, St. Angela's College, Sligo became part of ATU.

== Campuses ==
=== Galway Campus ===
Atlantic TU Galway campus is based on the Dublin Road in the Ballybane suburb of Galway city, overlooking Galway Bay. It is the administrative headquarters for the Institute and has four schools of study; the school of business, the school of engineering, the school of science & computing, and Galway International Hotel School. Also located at this campus are the Innovation Hub, the Lifelong Learning Centre and the Research, Development & Innovation Centre.

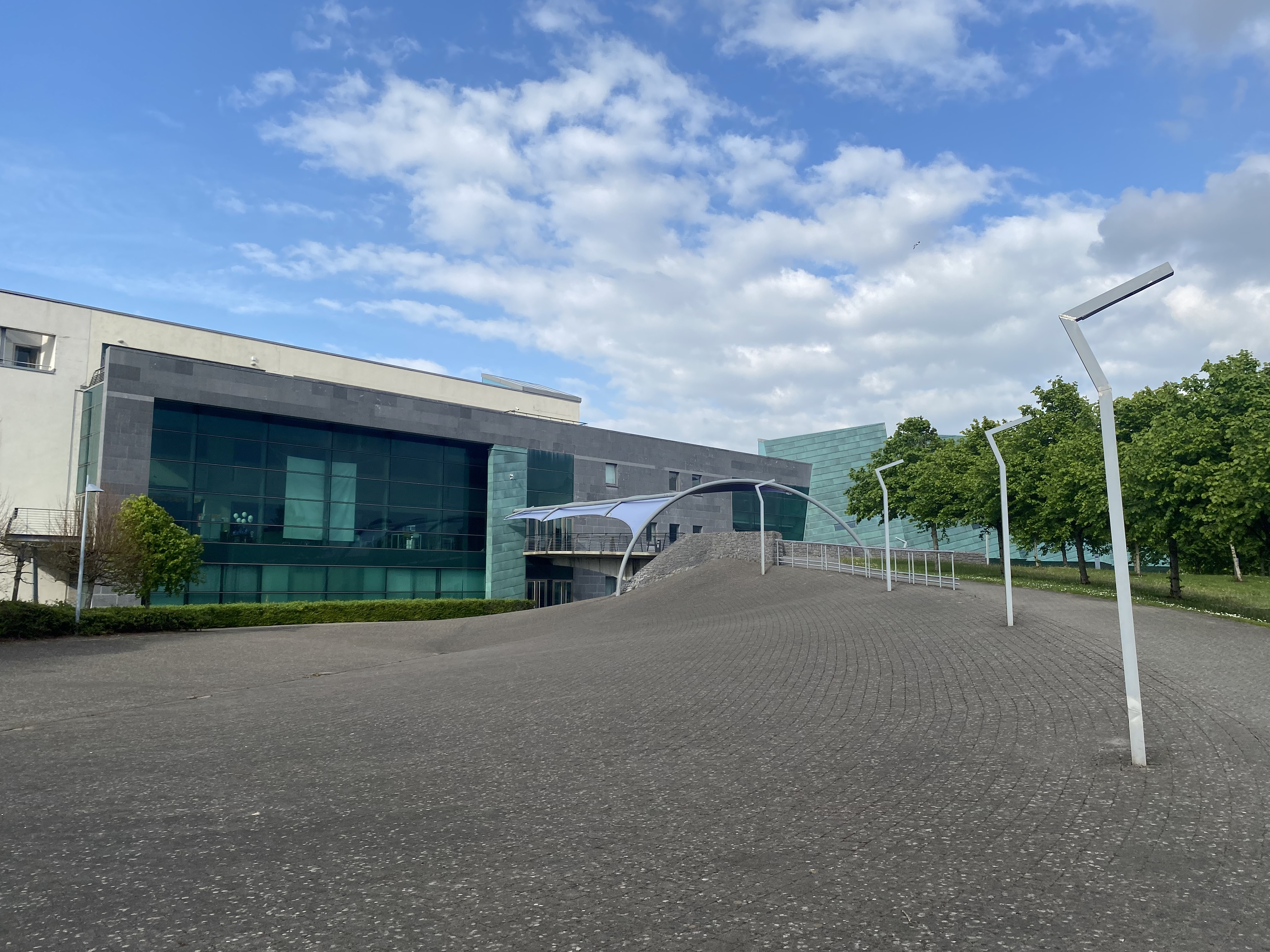
Main entrance to ATU Galway campus

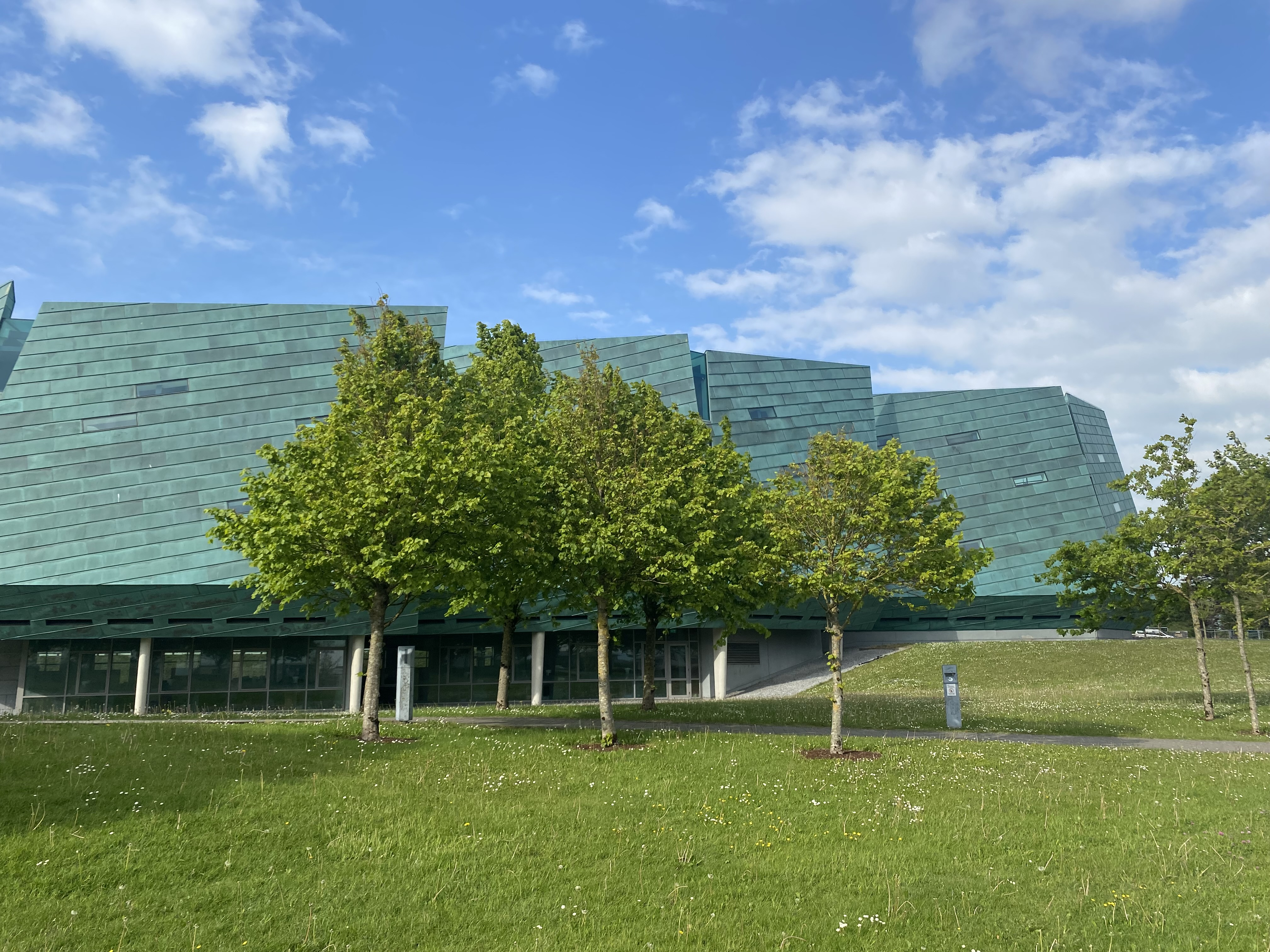
Library of ATU Galway campus

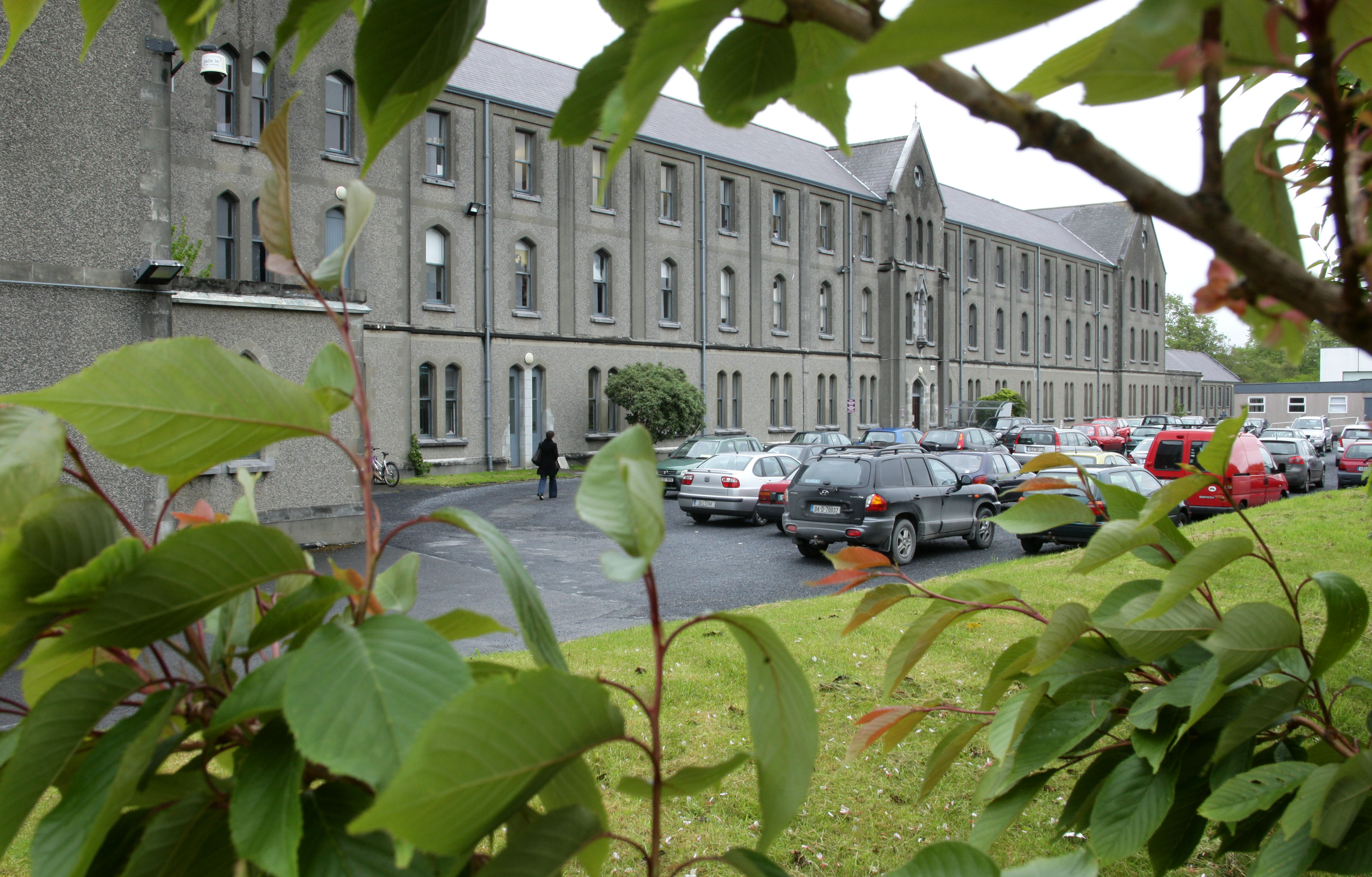
ATU's Centre for Creative Arts and Media, Wellpark Road campus, Galway city

==== Wellpark Road campus ====
Atlantic TU's Centre for Creative Arts and Media (CCAM) is located at the satellite Wellpark Road campus situated on the Wellpark Road / Monivea Road, in Galway city, approximately 1.2 km west of the main campus.

It is based in an old Redemptorist monastery named Cluain Mhuire, which is a protected structure dating from the 1940s. The campus is still sometimes referred to as the Cluain Mhuire campus. The monastery was home to GMIT's School of Design and Creative Arts from 1998 until its rebranding in 2022 as Atlantic Technological University, and offers undergraduate courses in design, contemporary arts, film & documentary, textiles and fine art.

In 2016, it introduced post-graduate courses in Creative Practice to support artists, designers and filmmakers. The annual graduate exhibitions and screenings showcase the work being produced throughout the academic year.

In January 2020, GMIT announced that over €6 million was being invested into the Centre for Creative Arts and Media on the campus to accommodate growing student numbers.

=== Sligo Campus ===
The Sligo campus of the university is located in Ash Lane, Sligo town. In addition, St. Angela's College, Sligo, which is located a few miles outside the town, became part of the university in 2023. It was formally gifted to the university by the Ursuline Order of Nuns, which had established the college in 1952.

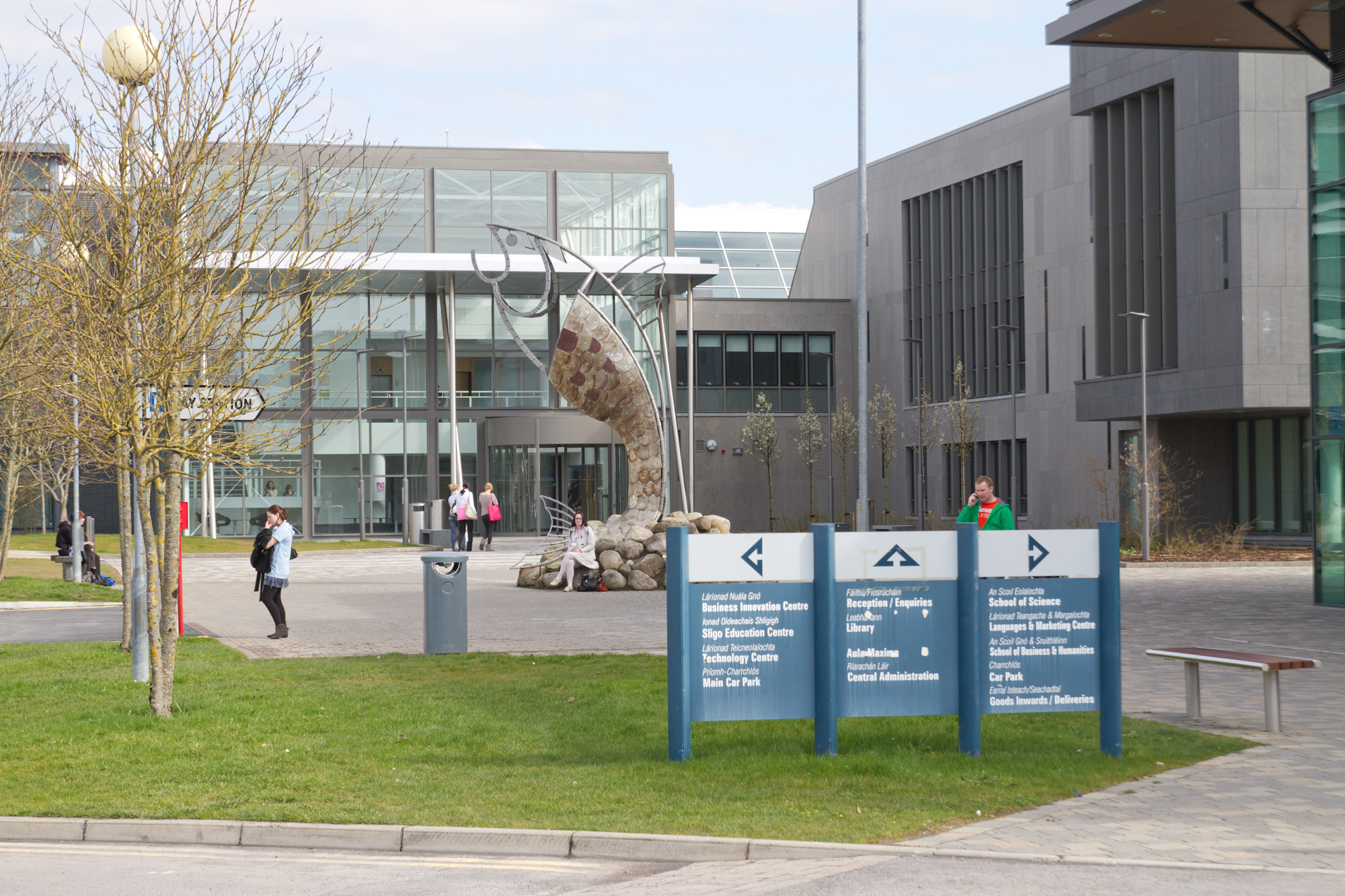
Main entrance to ATU Sligo campus

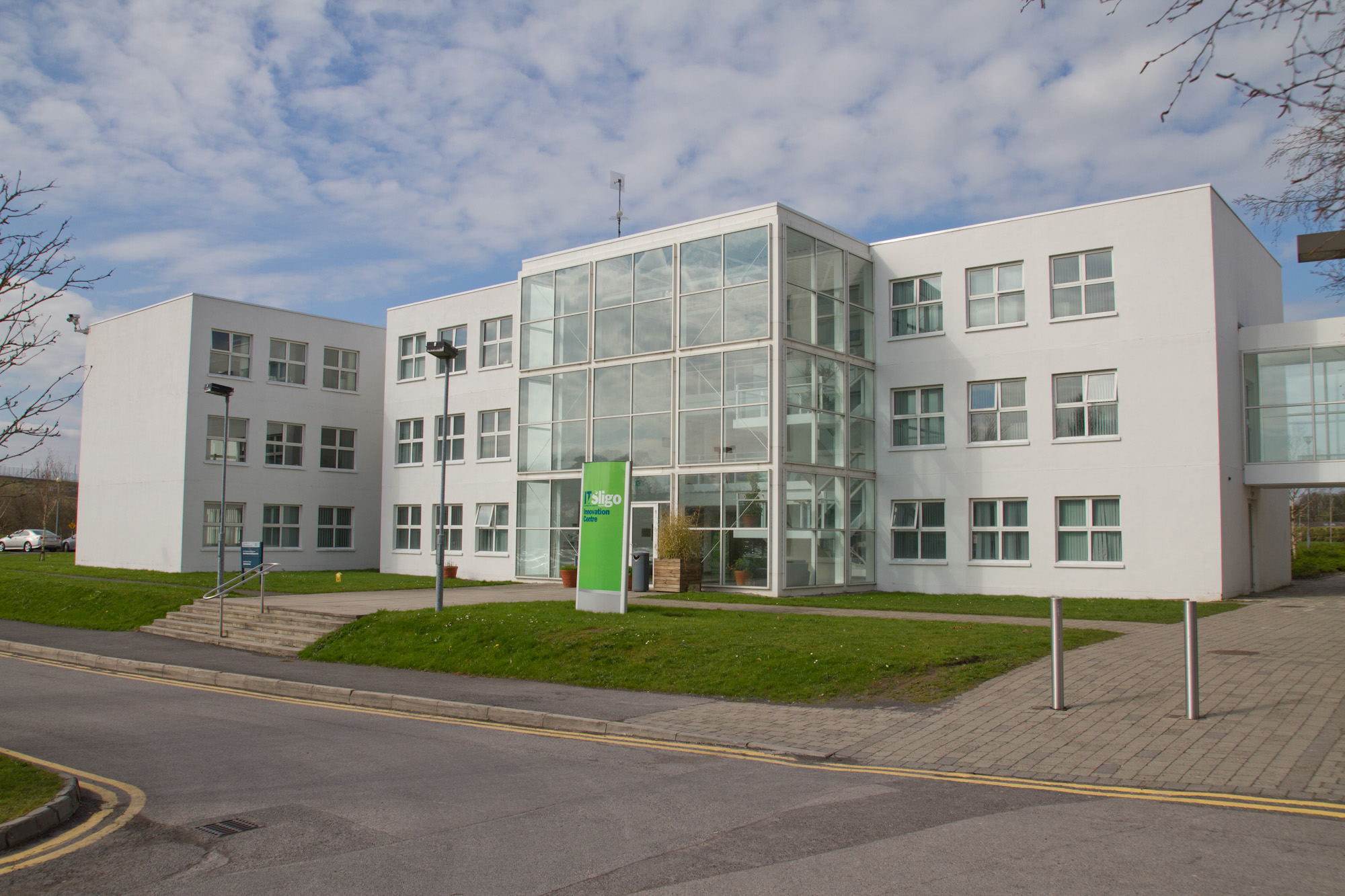
Business Innovation Centre (BIC) at ATU Sligo campus

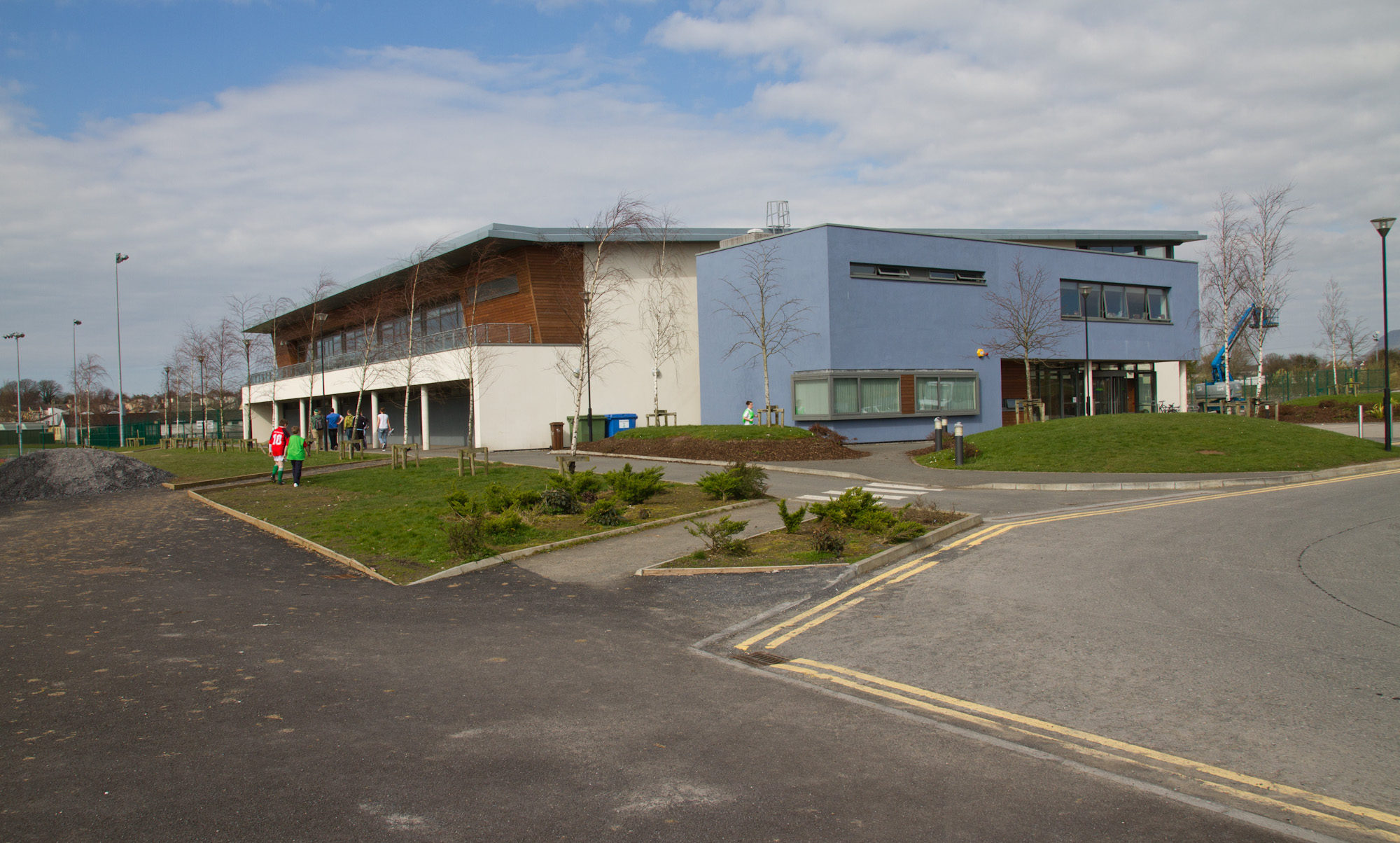
Sports centre at ATU Sligo campus

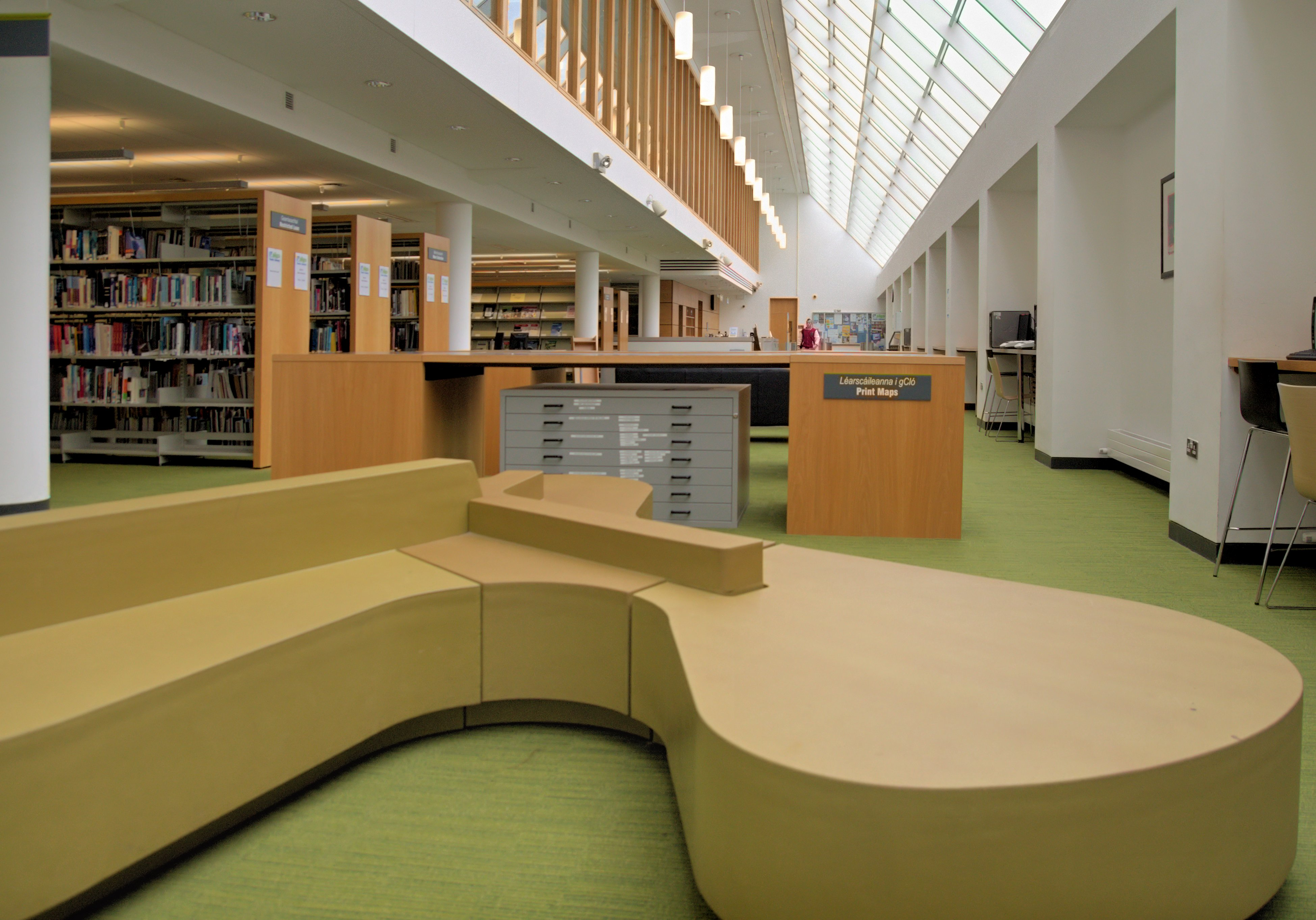
Section of library

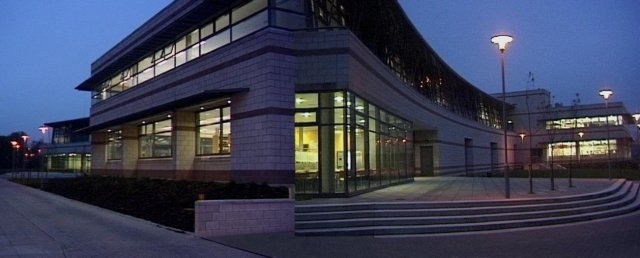
ATU Letterkenny Campus

=== Letterkenny Campus ===
ATU Letterkenny Campus lies on the Lower Port Road (part of the N14) in Letterkenny, County Donegal, in Ulster, the northern province in Ireland.

It offers a large range of programmes, including undergraduate and postgraduate courses in computing, engineering, design, science, business, veterinary practice, nursing and law.

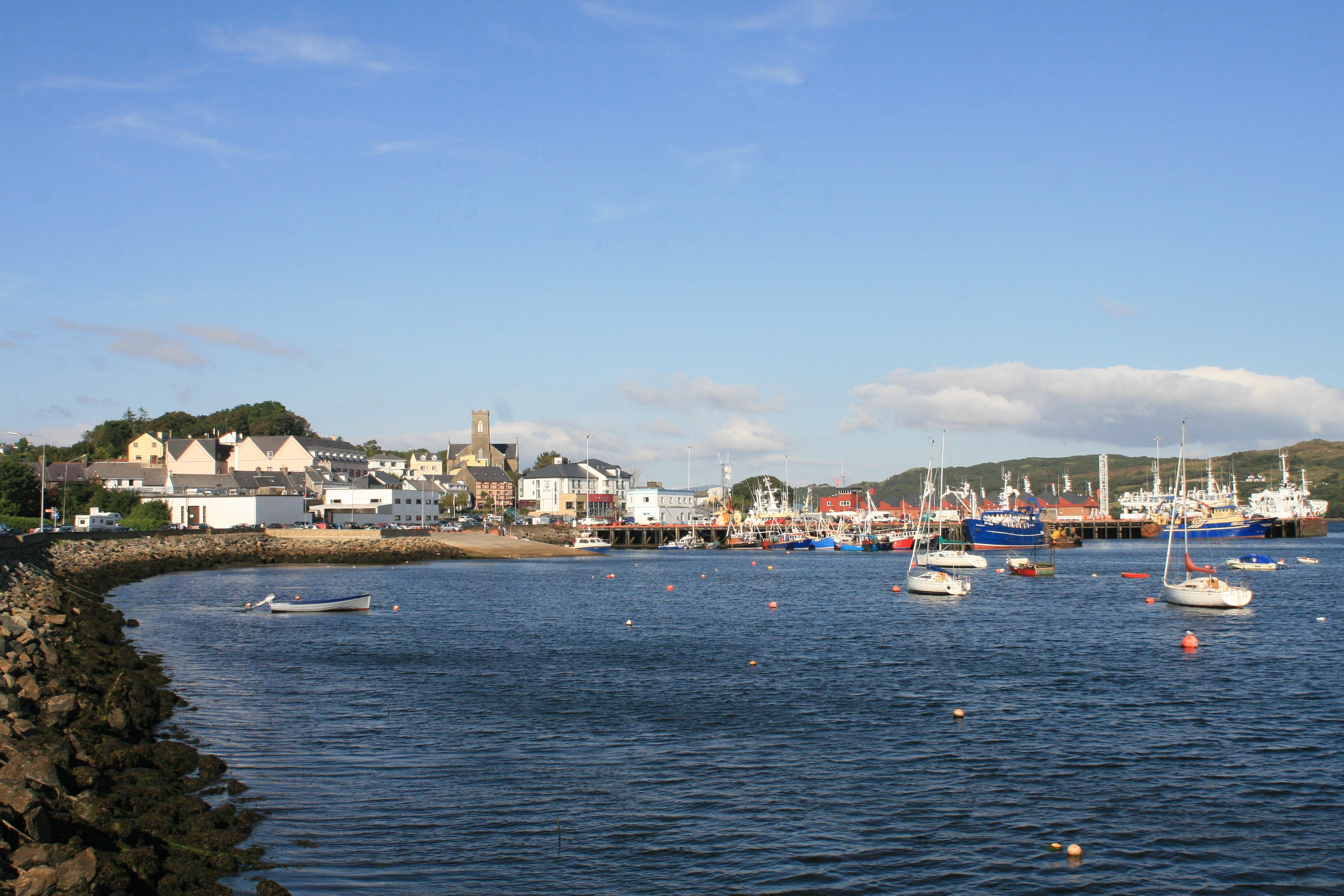
Killybegs harbour

=== Killybegs Campus ===
The ATU Killybegs Campus, located in the southwest of County Donegal in the west of Ulster, houses the School of Tourism. It is located by the harbour.

It is home to the ATU Department of Tourism and Sport and offers undergraduate and postgraduate courses in culinary arts, hospitality and tourism disciplines.

=== Mayo Campus ===
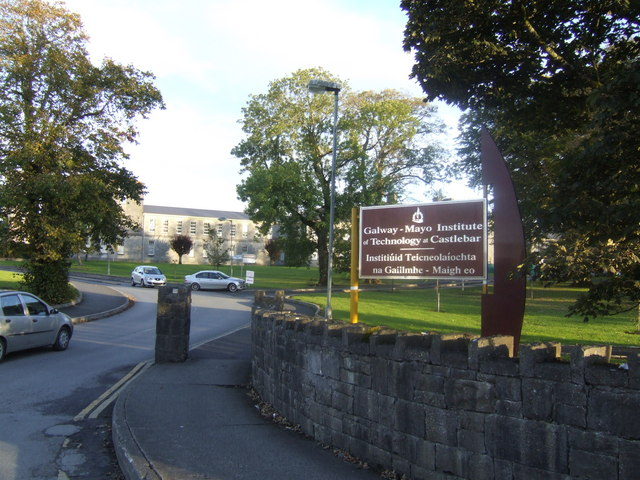
Campus building in Castlebar, originally built as St. Mary's Hospital in 1866.

Atlantic TU Mayo campus is located at Castlebar on approximately 20 hectares of land.

Degree courses on offer include business, engineering, humanities, nursing and social care, and technology. Atlantic TU Mayo campus also offers a wide range of Lifelong Learning courses, and has an Innovation Hub to support entrepreneurs and start-up businesses.

=== Letterfrack Campus ===
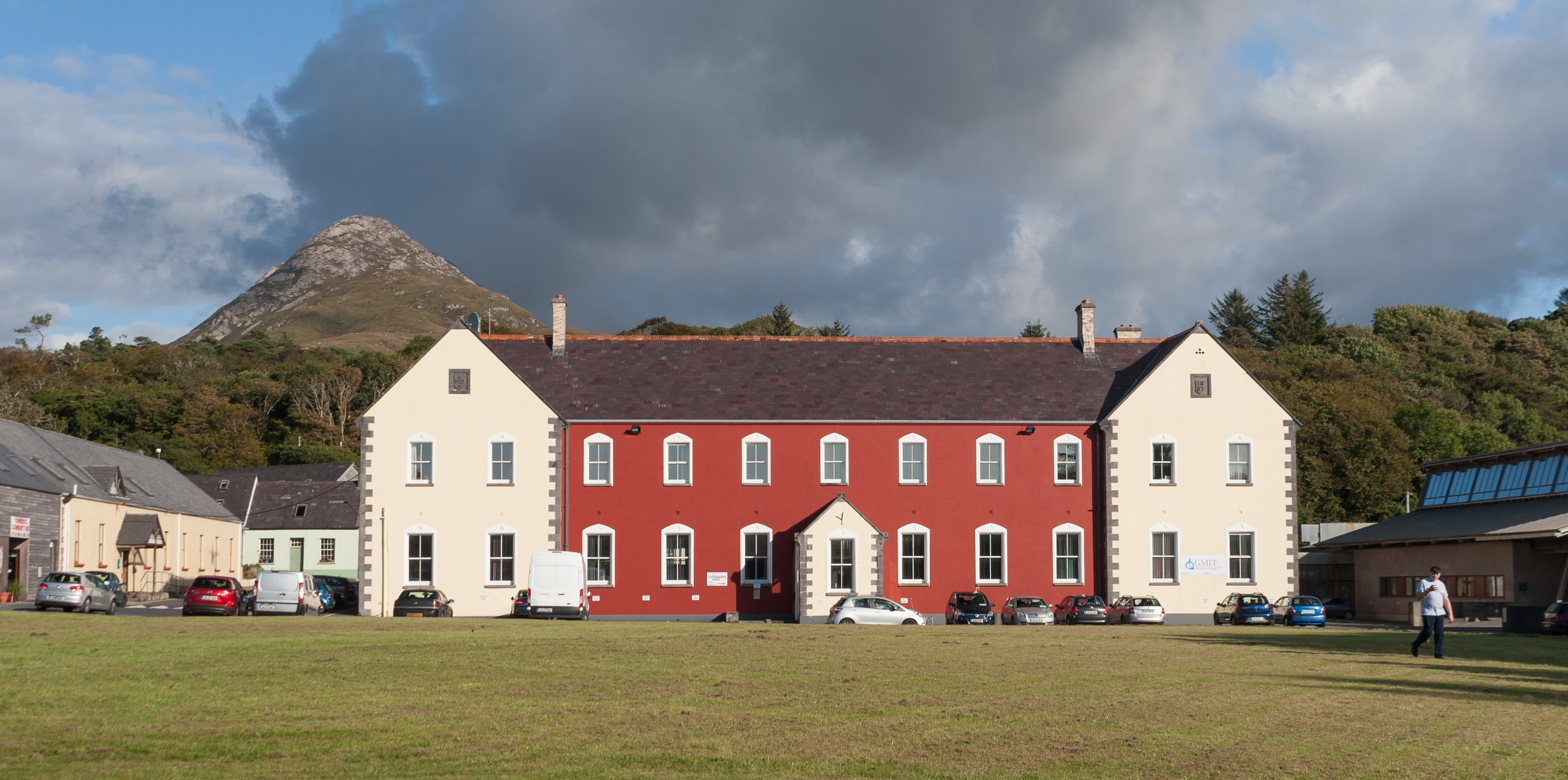
Campus building in Letterfrack, originally built as St Joseph's Industrial School in 1887 after the designs of the Cavan architect William Hague.

Atlantic TU Letterfrack campus is the National Centre of Excellence for Furniture Design and Wood Technology, and has been involved with the study of furniture design since 1987. It offers degree courses in furniture design and manufacture, furniture and wood technology, and teacher education (construction studies and DCG). The campus is located in Connemara in County Galway.

=== Mountbellew Campus ===
Mountbellew was the first agricultural college in Ireland, set up by the Franciscan Brothers in 1904. The original college was demolished in 1971 and replaced with the new building in 1975. In 1986, the Franciscan Brothers Agricultural College established a link with Regional Technical College, Galway to deliver a Higher Certificate in Business Studies (Agribusiness).

In 2023, ATU students in Mountbellew can choose between three types of degree (Agri-Business, Agri-Science or Agri-Engineering) and spend time between the Mountbellew and Galway Campuses.

== See also ==
- Education in the Republic of Ireland
