= Technological Universities in Ireland =

Type of university formed from institutes of technology in Ireland

A technological university is a type of higher education institution in Ireland, created from the merger of institutes of technology. The designation was provided for by the Technological Universities Act 2018, which established a process for consortia of institutes of technology to apply for designation as technological universities.

Technological universities are intended to address the social and economic needs of their regions, engage in industry-focused research, and provide vocationally and professionally oriented programmes, particularly in science and technology. As of 2026, Ireland has five technological universities: Technological University Dublin, Munster Technological University, Technological University of the Shannon: Midlands Midwest, Atlantic Technological University and South East Technological University.

== Background ==
The creation of technological universities was recommended in the National Strategy for Higher Education to 2030, and the process and criteria for designation were developed through the higher education landscape reform process. The Technological Universities Act 2018 provided for the establishment, functions and governance of technological universities, and for the dissolution of institutes of technology where their functions, assets, liabilities and staff were transferred to a new technological university.

The Act requires the consolidation of at least two institutes of technology for the creation of a technological university. Consortia applying for designation must demonstrate that they meet statutory criteria and standards, including requirements relating to staff qualifications, research activity, student engagement in lifelong learning, and other institutional capacities.

== Established technological universities ==
As of 2026, five technological universities have been established in Ireland.

Technological university	Established	Constituent institutions	Region
Technological University Dublin	1 January 2019	Dublin Institute of Technology, Institute of Technology, Blanchardstown and Institute of Technology, Tallaght	Dublin
Munster Technological University	1 January 2021	Cork Institute of Technology and Institute of Technology, Tralee	Munster
Technological University of the Shannon: Midlands Midwest	1 October 2021	Athlone Institute of Technology and Limerick Institute of Technology	Midlands and Midwest
Atlantic Technological University	1 April 2022	Galway-Mayo Institute of Technology, Institute of Technology, Sligo and Letterkenny Institute of Technology	West and north-west
South East Technological University	1 May 2022	Institute of Technology, Carlow and Waterford Institute of Technology	South-east

== Development ==
Technological University Dublin was the first technological university established in Ireland. It was designated in January 2019 following the merger of Dublin Institute of Technology, Institute of Technology Blanchardstown and Institute of Technology Tallaght.

Munster Technological University was established in January 2021 from the merger of Cork Institute of Technology and Institute of Technology Tralee. An earlier bid by the institutions had not been approved in 2019, but a later application was successful.

Technological University of the Shannon: Midlands Midwest was established in October 2021 from the merger of Athlone Institute of Technology and Limerick Institute of Technology. The university has campuses in locations including Athlone, Limerick, Clonmel, Ennis and Thurles.

Atlantic Technological University was established in April 2022, bringing together Galway-Mayo Institute of Technology, Institute of Technology Sligo and Letterkenny Institute of Technology.

South East Technological University was established in May 2022 from the merger of Institute of Technology Carlow and Waterford Institute of Technology.

== Remaining institutes of technology ==
As of 2026, all former institutes of technology except Dundalk Institute of Technology and Dún Laoghaire Institute of Art, Design and Technology had amalgamated to form the five technological universities.

Dundalk Institute of Technology had previously considered routes to technological university status, including a possible merger with an existing technological university. In 2025, Queen's University Belfast and Dundalk Institute of Technology announced a strategic partnership intended to establish a university college in Dundalk.

In 2026, the Government published the General Scheme of the Technological Universities All Island University Group (Amendment) Bill 2026. The proposed legislation would allow Dundalk Institute of Technology to enter a strategic partnership with Queen's University Belfast and apply to become a technological university college. Under the general scheme, on completion of the process and with ministerial agreement, DkIT would be dissolved and become Dundalk Technological University College, with the operational name Dundalk University College, a college of Queen's University Belfast.

Under the proposed partnership, DkIT would remain an autonomous institute of higher education in the State, designated under the Higher Education Authority Act 2022, funded by the Higher Education Authority, and autonomous over institutional finances, staffing and governance. Its undergraduate and postgraduate higher education programmes at Dundalk would lead to awards conferred by Queen's University Belfast. If completed, the transition would leave Dún Laoghaire Institute of Art, Design and Technology as the last remaining institute of technology in Ireland.

== Research and sectoral development ==
The Higher Education Authority has supported the development of the technological university sector through targeted funding and sectoral initiatives. The Technological University Research Network (TURN) was established in 2019 to examine how emerging technological universities could achieve their sectoral and national objectives and what supports would be required.

The Technological University Transformation Fund was a three-year fund totalling €90 million for the development of technological universities. In 2023, the HEA launched the TU Research and Innovation Supporting Enterprise scheme, known as TU RISE, with €83.68 million for research capacity building and regional enterprise engagement in the technological sector.

The Technological Sector Advancement Fund, launched in 2023, provided €50 million for initiatives regarded as critical to the strategic development of the technological sector. In 2025, the Targeted Enhancement Fund was launched to provide up to €65.8 million over 2026–2028 for technological universities, institutes of technology and publicly funded specialist colleges.

== See also ==
- Third-level education in the Republic of Ireland
- Institutes of technology in the Republic of Ireland
- Higher Education Authority
- Department of Further and Higher Education, Research, Innovation and Science
