= Peter Kawalek =

Peter Kawalek is professor at the Loughborough University Business School, and also with experience as Visiting Faculty at Instituto de Empresa in Madrid, Letterkenny Institute of Technology in Letterkenny, Ireland, Trinity College, Dublin, and other institutions. His books consider the role of technology in organizations and society, the latest being focused on long-term studies of Enterprise Systems. Kawalek is known as a board-level advisor on digital issues, working also with government agencies.

== Bibliography ==
1. Lorenzo, O., Kawalek, P., González. G and Ramdani., B., (2011) The Long Conversation, IE Business Publishing, Palgrave Macmillan, 9780230297883
2. Warboys, B., Kawalek, P., Robertson I, Greenwood R M (1999) Business Information Systems: a process approach, McGraw-Hill, 0-07709-464-6
3. Kawalek, P., Norris M, Busard D (2000) Systems Modeling for Business Process Improvement, Artech House, 1-58053-050-8
