= Letterkenny Institute of Technology =

Former higher educational institution in Letterkenny, Ireland

- Institiúid Teicneolaíochta Leitir Ceanainn
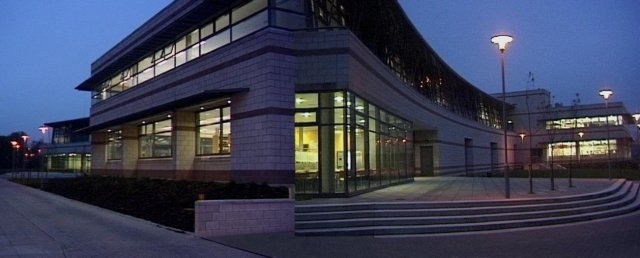
- Type: Public
- Active: 1971–April 2022
- President: Paul Hannigan
- Students: 5,000+
- Location: Port Road, Letterkenny, Ulster, Ireland
- Website: www.lyit.ie

The Letterkenny Institute of Technology (LYIT; Irish: Institiúid Teicneolaíochta Leitir Ceanainn) was an institute of technology, located in Letterkenny, Ireland.

Based at Letterkenny in County Donegal, it was one of the smaller places of third level education in the historic province of Ulster, with a lower student intake than other colleges such as Belfast Metropolitan College and the regional colleges of the North West, South, South East and South West, all of which themselves are smaller than the universities in Belfast and Belfast/Coleraine/Derry/Jordanstown.

In April 2022, it was formally dissolved, and its functions became part of Atlantic Technological University.

== History ==
Letterkenny was rejected as a suitable site for a Regional Technical College, though this was later overturned. It is one of the original networks of Regional Technical Colleges established in various towns decided to be suitable for the requirements (such as Carlow in the south east and Dundalk, north of the capital Dublin), namely to deal with the chronic shortage of technicians with the skills required to enter the workforce. Messrs Mehon and MacPhillips were brought from Kilkenny as contractors of the building. The Regional Technical College, Letterkenny's construction occurred in the absence of any clarity as to its purpose or function and such was the rapidity of work that the provision of information about services that the building would contain was not disseminated with any efficiency – in other words, the services were of secondary importance to getting the building off the ground.

It opened in 1971, with Danny O'Hare as first principal (1971-1974). Patrick O'Donnell, PC, UDC, the Vice-Chairman of the Donegal Vocational Education Committee, accepted the building's key in May 1971. The inaugural meeting of an entity known as the "council", acting in an advisory capacity on policy and resources to board of management (at same meeting O'Donnell was elected chairman), announced that the instruction of technicians would begin early the following month, reported the Donegal News early in September 1971, with a three-year course on business studies, a two-year course in secretarial studies and two-year courses on civil and mechanical engineering the first to be advertised. Dr D O'Hare admitted that the scholarship grant was inadequate and would affect admissions from elsewhere in Donegal but said the Regional Technical College was "here to serve the people". The Regional Technical College began functioning on a Tuesday in October 1971 with an attendance of 170, some travelling all the way from Glencolmcille, and staff that were not very experienced with the eldest being 35 years of age. The staff that the thing had numbered 15, the Engineering Department had an acting head and a Mr Patten headed the Business Department. This not being a satisfactory state of affairs, in November 1971, public meetings were conducted to demonstrate the ways the Regional Technical College could get part-time admissions from the public further away from the town, and more than 90 but not quite the full 100 people attended in Glenties. O'Hare, however, was gone within three years.

The Regional was also referred to as Donogh O'Malley Regional Technical College, Letterkenny, until 1992, in honor of Donogh O'Malley, TD, the reforming Minister for Education.

The Regional's earliest history, founded so soon after the cataclysm of France in May 68, was marked by dispute and unrest. In the 1970s, the Donegal News reported that "About 39 men walked off the site... of the new School of Technology, Port Road, Letterkenny on Monday morning". The "stoppage of work", the newspaper said, was a "protest".

Parts of the facility moved to St Conal's, the building housing the Donegal District Lunatic Asylum, in 1979.

The 1990s brought a phenomenon known as "student bashing", whereby local gangs would select a student who might be returning from attending a local disco. The gangs would then assault the student, causing injuries serious enough to require hospital treatment.

By the mid-1990s, numbers attending the Regional Technical College had declined substantially as universities came to be viewed as the better option. Technical staff went on strike, causing disruption to classes.

In 1994, following concerns about the management of the Regional Technical College, the management board was replaced by a commission appointed by the Minister of Education. In 1996, the minister restored the governance and management to the RTC.

In late 1997, a rebranding exercise determined the adoption of the title "Letterkenny Institute of Technology", to move it in line with the other Regional Technical Colleges scattered in various other urban settlements throughout the country.

A Higher Education Authority (HEA) report published in December 2020 showed that the institution had the highest proportion nationally of attendees from impoverished, disadvantaged backgrounds, with only 3 per cent of those in attendance being from a background where wealth was in evidence. The average household income for anyone attending the Letterkenny facility was €35,853, a steep decline on the national average of €49,603.

As of 2021, most of the people attending the facility were from Donegal. People also came from places like Monaghan to enhance the college's cosmopolitan status. Three new courses were offered in 2021: these were titled Marketing with Online Technology, Architectural Technology and Electric vehicle Engineering.

LYIT was among Higher Education institutions to feature in a 2021 survey by the Higher Education Authority on sexual harassment, with one third of female respondents experiencing it and more than half of students saying they had been harassed by sexual jokes, comments on their bodies or appearance and enforced efforts to speak about sex.

== Schools and Departments ==
- School of Business
  - Department of Business Studies
  - Department of Law & Humanities
  - Department of Design & Creative Media
- School of Engineering
  - Department of Civil Engineering & Construction
  - Department of Electronic & Mechanical Engineering
- School of Science
  - Department of Computing
  - Department of Science

== Courses ==
The institute offers over 130 programmes that range from one to four years in computing, engineering, design, science, the "social science" of business, veterinary practice, nursing and law. The courses are offered at levels 6 through 10 on the NQAI framework. Courses are offered in a semesterised and modularised method. Specialist courses that may be found in LYIT include the Bachelor of Science (Hons) in Fire Safety Technology which is the only one of its kind in Ireland, other specialist degrees also include Bachelor of Science (Hons) In Analytical and Forensic Science. The Technical College is one of only two institutes in Ireland to offer degrees approved by the King's Inns. The BA (Hons) in law has been approved degree status by the society. The Institute also co-operates closely on many courses and much research with Magee College, part of the University of Ulster, in nearby Derry.

The institute also offers support for businesses through specialized short-term courses, collaborative research, and the Co-Lab.

== Sport ==
The college offers various sports teams and has reached many awards and trophies in recent years:

In 2017, the basketball team won a Division 2 College title, while the following year the ladies' basketball team won a College title as well.

The association football team finished as losing finalists in the CUFL League Finals in 2018. The ladies' soccer team won both the championship for all of the Division 1 Colleges league and the O'Regan Plate competition in 2018.

Though it is unable to compete at the top level of Gaelic football – where the traditional university teams and a small selection of lesser third-level institutions are to be found – LYIT does manage to put together a team at times. It would, however, be uncommon to find a player in it who has attained any recognition at the elite inter-county level of the sport. For any such players as these, one might have more luck searching the teams of the Universities of Galway or Dublin (City or University College). Nevertheless, men representing LYIT did win a Trench Cup in 2019. They then opted to contest the 2020 Sigerson Cup, not once meeting any of the universities and coming undone against an unfancied IT Carlow, in part through lack of discipline, and with the game taking place in their own province at that.

LYIT hurling's last success was winning the fourth tier Corn MacDiamada competition during the 2015–16 season.

== Associated college ==
The Coláiste Turasóireachta Na Cealla Beaga (Tourism College Killybegs), founded in 1969, and adopting its current name in 1992, is an academic school of the institute, in accordance with the Institutes of Technology Act 2006. The School of Tourism is located on a five-acre site on the Shore Road overlooking Killybegs Harbour. The School is a hub of activity providing business and practical training which prepares graduates for a wide variety of careers in culinary arts, hospitality management, and tourism.

== Achievements ==
With Tallaght, it came joint second to the Galway-Mayo in The Sunday Times University Guide 2007, (though not universities, this guide also ranked the technical colleges after dealing with the top universities). Letterkenny also had the country's best record for providing third-level education to disadvantaged students.

== Atlantic Technological University ==
In October 2020, Letterkenny, Galway-Mayo and Sligo Institutes of Technology were allocated over €5.5 million to support the formation of a Technological University for the West/North-West of Ireland. Formal approval for the creation of a TU was granted in October 2021 and Atlantic TU was established on 1 April 2022.

== Notable alumni ==
- Grainne Gallanagh – the model and beauty pageant titleholder (Miss Universe Ireland 2018) was part of the Top 20 beauties on display at Miss Universe 2018.
- Nikki Hayes – the DJ and radio personality. Hayes, discussing the impact mental health issues have had on her life, described how: "While I was in college I was really unhappy. Things were getting very much out of control, and with partying and alcohol those manic highs were becoming really, really high and the lows were really, really low... When I took the overdose in college, I had a brain seizure because it was so bad".
- Sean Fingleton – artist

== See also ==
- Education in the Republic of Ireland
- Education in Letterkenny
- Third-level education in the Republic of Ireland
