= South East Technological University =

University in the south east of Ireland

Coordinates: 52.246063°N 7.138733°W

- Ollscoil Teicneolaíochta an Oirdheiscirt
- Logo of the university
- Other name: SETU
- Type: Public technological university
- Established: 1 May 2022; 4 years ago
- Affiliations: TUA; EUA; UI; EUt+
- Chair: Patrick Prendergast
- President: Veronica Campbell
- Location: Main Campus Cork Road, Waterford City, Co.Waterford, X91 K0EK, Ireland
- Colours: Slate grey
- Website: www.setu.ie

South East Technological University (SETU; Irish: Ollscoil Teicneolaíochta an Oirdheiscirt) is a public technological university located in the South East region of Ireland. It was formed from the amalgamation of two existing institutes of technology in the region – Waterford IT and IT Carlow. Following years of discussions and planning, its formation was announced in November 2021 and was formally established on 1 May 2022. It is the only university in the South East of Ireland.

== Background ==
In 2013 the Irish government signed off on a plan to set up the first technological universities (TU) in Ireland. One of these TUs was to combine Institute of Technology Carlow with Waterford Institute of Technology. Waterford Institute of Technology had opened in 1970 as a Regional Technical College and adopted its present name on 7 May 1997. It first made an unsuccessful application to become a university in 2006, under the Universities Act 1997. Similarly, a third level institute was founded in Carlow in 1970, under the name Regional Technical College Carlow, which adopted its Institute of Technology, Carlow title in the '90s. Although this TU proposal was strongly supported by the southern region's Regional Spatial and Economic Strategy, development was temporarily delayed in 2014.

=== Timeline ===
IT Carlow had been planning a joint application with Waterford IT for the formation of a Technological University for the South East region since the mid-2010s. A vision document, "Technological University for the South East" (TUSE) was published in 2015, and a memorandum of understanding was signed in 2017.

In May 2018, a spokesperson for the Higher Education Authority (HEA) expressed a belief that a formal application will be made in Autumn 2018, with an approval expected in spring 2019. At the launch of TU Dublin in July 2018, the Taoiseach expressed regret that this TUSE bid had not progressed sufficiently following the Technological Universities Act 2018. The TUSEI bid was due to be submitted in September 2018. In November 2018 Dr. Patricia Mulcahy, President of IT Carlow described the goal for TUSEI as "a leading European technological university recognised for regional connectedness and global impact".

Plans were being compiled in February 2019, and were awaiting financial clarification in May 2019. Staff of IT Carlow rejected the proposal in June 2019, and WIT staff rejected it in April 2021. In 2019 the Department of Education and Skills rejected requests to cover budget deficits in WIT.

In July 2020, Minister for Further and Higher Education, Research, Innovation and Science, Simon Harris appointed Tom Boland, of the HEA to lead the TU merger bid. A formal application was lodged in May 2021. Finally, after an international review, the South East Technological University was established in May 2022. A record of the work since then is given on the Governing Body website.

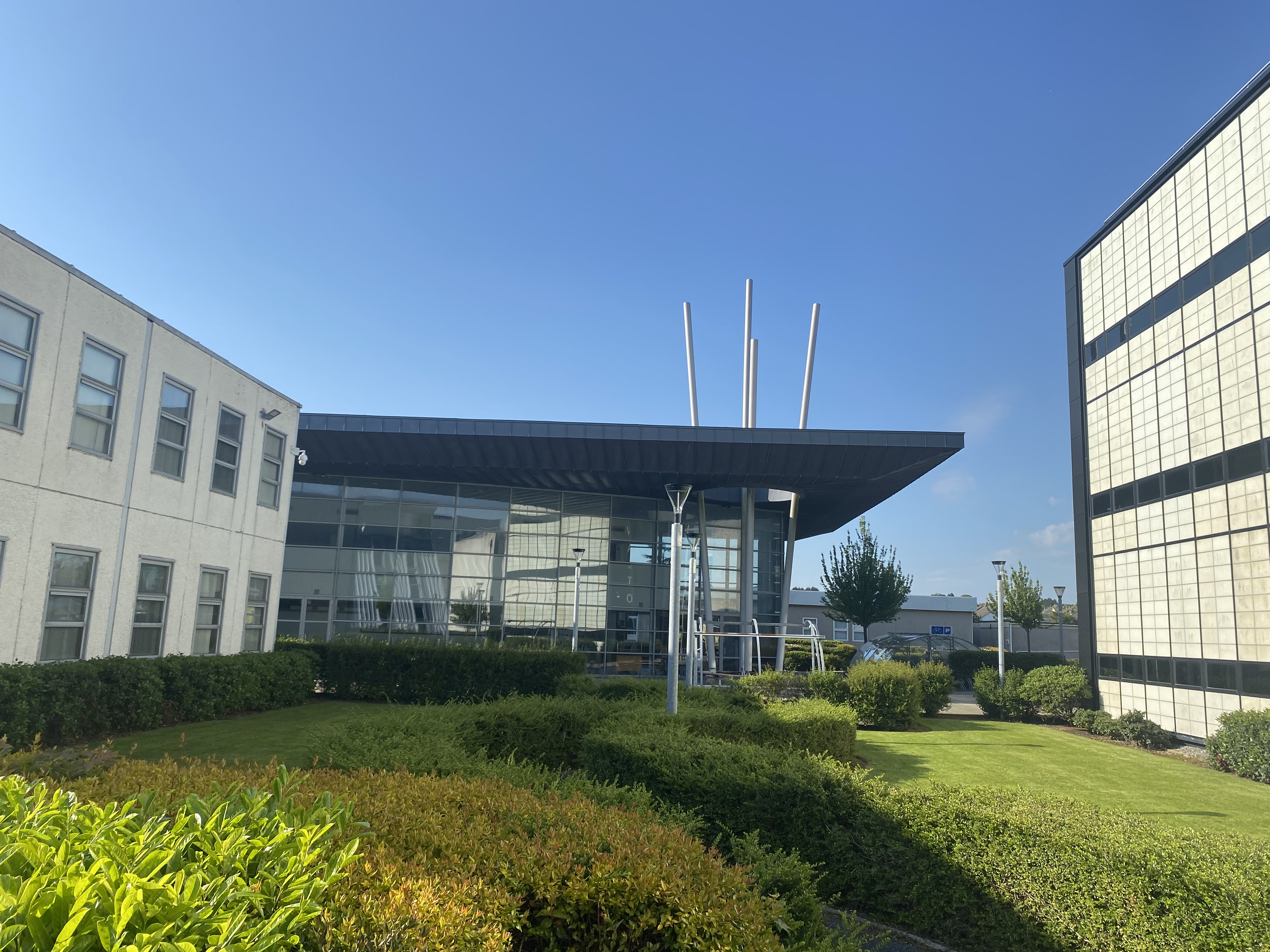
SETU Waterford campus

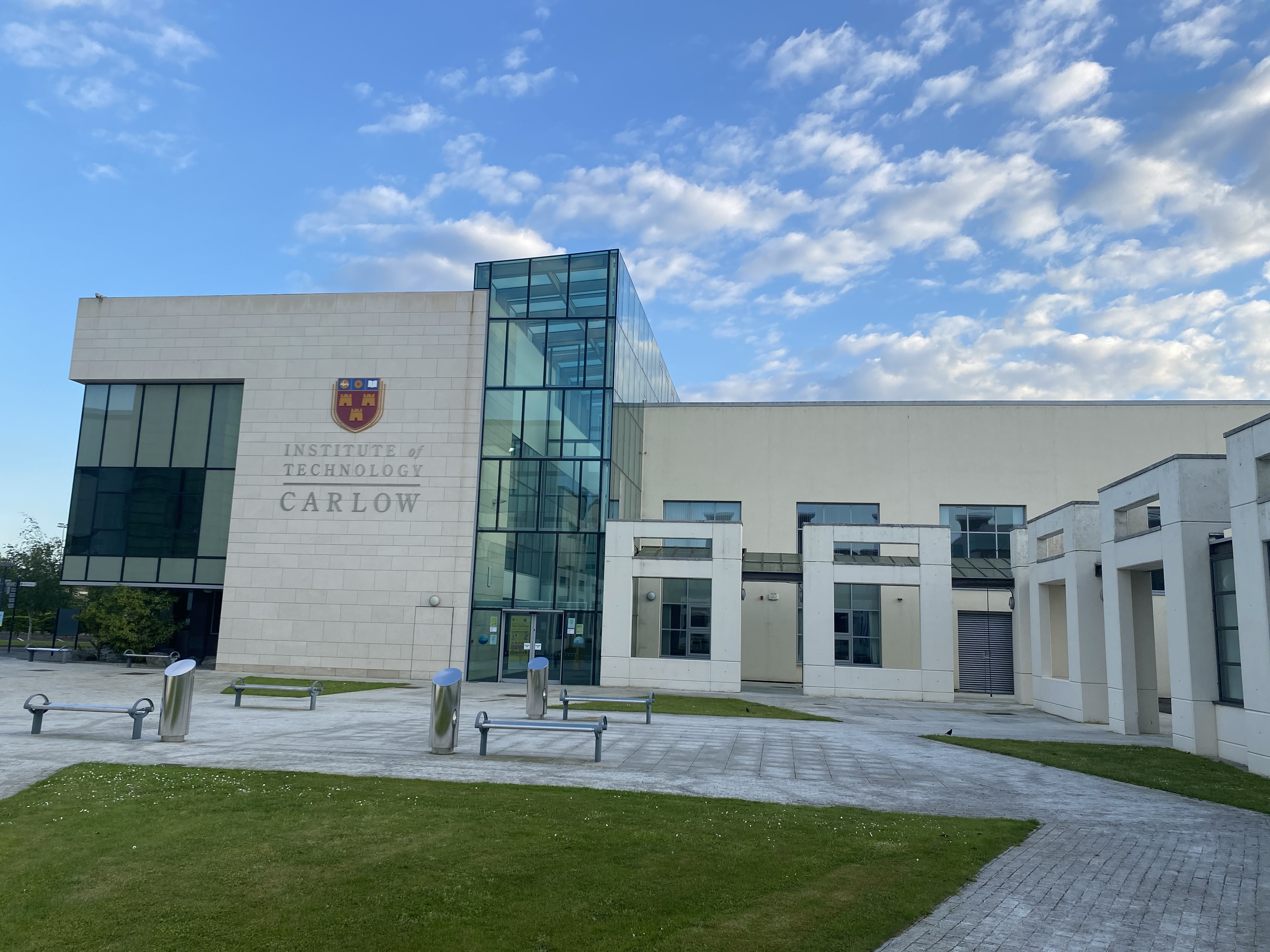
SETU Carlow campus

== Campuses ==
SETU is located in five towns in the South East of Ireland. The two largest centres are in Waterford and Carlow. In Waterford it has five sub-campuses while in Carlow it has three.

There are also campuses in Wexford, Rathnew, and Kilkenny.

== Research ==
The university has concentrated research activity in certain dedicated areas in both Waterford and Carlow. In Waterford, the centres include:

- Walton Institute for Information and Communication Systems Science
- PMBRC: Pharmaceutical and Molecular Biotechnology Research Centre
- SEAM: South Eastern Applied Materials Research Centre
- INSYTE: Centre for Information Systems and Techno-culture
- SABRE: Sustainable Architecture & Built Environment
- EIRC: Eco-Information Research Centre
- NRCI: Nutrition Research Centre Ireland.

In Carlow, there are seven Centres of Research Excellence (CORE):

- Bio-environmental Technology (enviroCORE)
- Advanced Software and Networks (compuCORE)
- Design Innovation (designCORE)
- AdvancING Technology (engCORE)
- National Centre for Men's Health (HealthCORE)
- Enhancing Professional Practice (SocialCORE)
- Business Technology Management (RIKON)

== Rankings ==
In the 2026 QS World University Rankings, SETU was ranked 1500+ in the Sustainability ranking, 651-700 in the European University ranking and 175 in the Northern European university ranking.
