= Institutes of technology in the Republic of Ireland =

Higher education institution in Ireland

An Institute of Technology (IT) is a type of higher education college found in Ireland. In 2018, there were a total of fourteen colleges that use the title of Institute of Technology, which were created from the late 1960s and were formerly known as Regional Technical Colleges. The exception to this was Dublin Institute of Technology which emerged independently of the Regional College system. The Technological Universities Act of 2018 allowed the merger of two or more IoTs into Technological Universities, which saw the creation of the Technological University Dublin in 2019; Munster Technological University and Technological University Shannon: Midlands Midwest in 2021; and Atlantic Technological University and South East Technological University in 2022.

== Creation ==
The idea of the institutions was first announced by Patrick Hillery in 1963. A year later, a site for an institution in Carlow was identified.

The Investment in Education (1962) and Training of Technicians in Ireland (1964) reports greatly accelerated the trend in Ireland for education reform and development particularly in technical education, similar to that in other Western countries at the time.

The Training of Technicians in Ireland (1964) report identified significant skills gaps, including:

a further serious difficulty in the task of raising the standards of technicians in Ireland is the lack of a nationally recognised technician diploma. The absence of such a diploma deters many parents from considering sub-professional technician careers for their children

The Steering Committee on Technical Education, also called The Mulcahy Report (1967), was an important milestone in framing the institutional structures and functions calling for:

we believe that the long-term function of the colleges will be to educate for trade and industry over a broad spectrum of occupations ranging from craft to professional, notably in engineering and science but also in commercial, linguistic and other specialities. They will, however, be more immediately concerned with providing courses aimed at filling gaps in the industrial manpower structure, particularly in the technician area

we do not foresee any final fixed pattern of courses in the colleges. If they are to make their most effective contribution to the needs of society and the economy, they must be capable of continuing adaptation to social, economic and technological changes. Initiative at local and national levels will largely determine how far this vital characteristic is developed. We are concerned that the progress of these colleges should not be deterred by any artificial limitation of either the scope or the level of their educational achievements

The building programme commenced in 1968, with the first institutions formally opened their doors in 1970, and other colleges were added during the following decade. Some colleges developed from earlier institutions and colleges, involving amalgamation, but most were completely new institutions. A Regional Technical College for Limerick was cancelled after a National Institute for Higher Education was announced for the city. Finally, in 1993, CoACT (College of Art, Commerce and Technology) became Limerick RTC. Two additional institutions were created since then, bringing the total to thirteen, before the amalgamation of three into Ireland's first Technological University, TU Dublin. As of June 2023, only Dundalk IT and Dún Laoghaire Institute of Art, Design and Technology remain independent Institutes of Technology.

Name	Abbreviation	First Established	Technological University	Year amalgamated into TU
Athlone Institute of Technology	AIT	1970	Technological University of the Shannon: Midlands Midwest	2021
Institute of Technology, Blanchardstown	ITB	2000	Technological University Dublin	2019
Institute of Technology, Carlow	ITC	1970	South East Technological University	2022
Cork Institute of Technology	CIT	1974	Munster Technological University	2021
Dublin Institute of Technology†	DIT	1887	Technological University Dublin	2019
Dundalk Institute of Technology	DkIT	1970		
Dún Laoghaire Institute of Art, Design and Technology	IADT	1997		
Galway-Mayo Institute of Technology	GMIT	1972	Atlantic Technological University	2022
Letterkenny Institute of Technology	LYIT	1971	Atlantic Technological University	2022
Limerick Institute of Technology*	LIT	1852	Technological University of the Shannon: Midlands Midwest	2021
Institute of Technology, Sligo	ITS	1970	Atlantic Technological University	2022
Institute of Technology, Tallaght	ITT Dublin	1992	Technological University Dublin	2019
Institute of Technology, Tralee	IT Tralee	1977	Munster Technological University	2021
Waterford Institute of Technology	WIT	1970	South East Technological University	2022

†With the constituent Colleges originally established in 1887, Dublin Institute of Technology was reestablished in 1992. It was the first third level college to be called an Institute of Technology and was created under separate legislation with different powers than the other thirteen colleges. This includes the awarding of its own degrees up to doctorate level.

*LIT traces its roots back to the 1852 foundation of the School of Ornamental Art on Leamy Street. For much of the history of the institute, it was constituted as the Municipal Technical Institute, before becoming the Limerick College of Art, Commerce and Technology (Limerick CoACT) in 1980, a Regional Technical College in 1993 and an Institute of Technology in 1997.

== Legislation ==
The institutions were run under Section 21 (2) of the Vocational Education Acts from 1970 until 1992 as special subcommittees of the Vocational Education Committees, and placed on an independent basis thereafter by the Regional Technical Colleges Acts in 1993. In the late 1990s, all of the institutions were upgraded to Institute of Technology status. This was in recognition of the high standards, including university level research, which takes place at them. The institutes are governed by the Institutes of Technology Acts 1992 to 2006. Having been given delegated authority to confer their own awards in some cases up to Doctoral level by HETAC from 2001 onwards, in 2019 the institutes were designated as awarding bodies up to masters level in their own right.

== Management ==
The individual institutions are structured similar to other universities, particularly Irish ones. Each institution has a Director, who is the chief operational officer of the institution, usually assisted by an ad-hoc senior management team; a Registrar, who is the chief academic officer of the institution; a Governing Council, which oversees operational affairs; an Academic Council, which oversees academic affairs. Each academic school has a Head of School and each academic department of a school has a Head of Department.

== Programmes ==
The institutions traditional courses were National Certificate and National Diploma type courses particularly in business, engineering and science, this was very much the founding principle. During the late 1970s degrees at Bachelor's level were introduced, later Master's and Doctoral levels were also allowed. In recent years there has been a rapid expansion in apprenticeship and nursing type courses.

== Validation ==
Regional Technical College and Institute of Technology awards were conferred by the National Council for Educational Awards, this statutory authority became the Higher Education and Training Awards Council, and other awards are conferred by the Further Education and Training Awards Council. The latter two merged with the National Qualifications Authority of Ireland in 2012 to form the Quality and Qualifications Ireland. The exception was DIT, which conferred its own awards. Some specialised courses, such as accountancy, are validated by professional bodies but these are nearly always the exception.

== Technological Universities ==
Following the enactment of legislation in 2018, the various institutes of technology began a merger process to create five technological universities:

- Technological University Dublin
- Munster Technological University
- Technological University of the Shannon: Midlands Midwest
- Atlantic Technological University
- South East Technological University

In May 2021, Dundalk Institute of Technology announced plans to join an existing TU. It had previously investigated the possibility of becoming a TU in its own right.
