= St. Mary's Hospital, Castlebar =

St. Mary's Hospital
- Health Service Executive
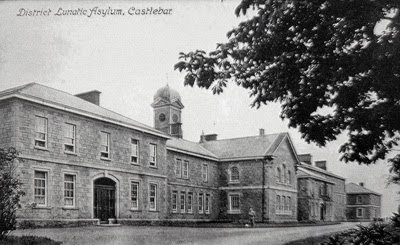
- St. Mary's Hospital

- Shown in Ireland

Geography
- Location: Castlebar, County Mayo, Ireland
- Coordinates: 53.84978°N 9.30523°W

Organisation
- Care system: HSE
- Type: Specialist

Services
- Speciality: Psychiatric hospital

History
- Founded: 1833
- Closed: 2006

St. Mary's Hospital (Irish: Ospidéal Naomh Mhuire) was a psychiatric hospital in Castlebar, County Mayo, Ireland.

== History ==
The hospital, which was designed by George Wilkinson opened as the Castlebar Asylum in 1866. It was extended in the late 1890s. It became the Castlebar Mental Hospital in the 1920s and it went on to become St. Mary's Hospital in the 1950s.

Pádraig Flynn, Minister of State at the Department of Transport, officially opened a new Industrial Therapy Unit in May 1981. After the introduction of deinstitutionalisation in the late 1980s the hospital went into a period of decline and closed in 2006. The building was converted for use as the Mayo Campus of the Galway-Mayo Institute of Technology in 1994.
