= St. Angela's College, Sligo =

Educational institution in Ireland

- Coláiste San Aingeal, Sligeach
- Established: 1952
- Affiliations: NUI (1978–2005), University of Galway (2005–2022), Atlantic Technological University (2022-present)
- President: Dr Amanda McCloat
- Students: 1,400
- Location: Sligo, Ireland; 54.2595°N 8.3828°W
- Website: https://www.stangelas.ie/

St. Angela's College, Sligo (Irish: Coláiste San Aingeal, Sligeach) is a college of the Atlantic Technological University located beside Lough Gill, County Sligo.

== History ==
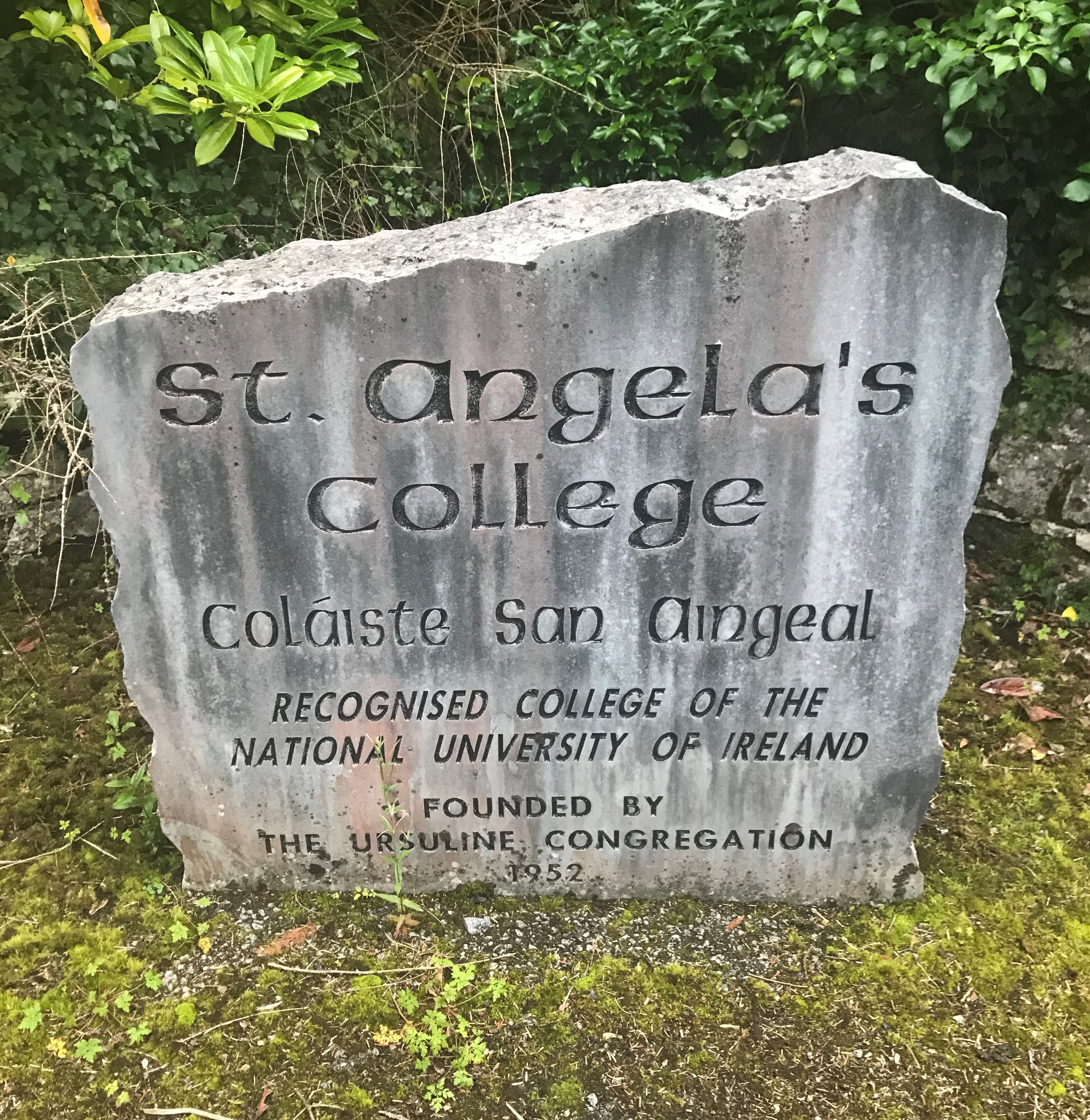
Commemoration headstone outside college.

St. Angela’s College was founded by the Ursuline Order in 1952 and was a recognised college of the National University of Ireland from 1978-2006. In 2006 the college became a recognised constituent college of the National University of Ireland Galway. It became a college of the Atlantic Technological University in 2022.

== Academics ==
The college initially offered a three-year teaching diploma in Home Economics. This three year course continued until 1978 when a four year university degree course was introduced, with the first students graduating in 1981 with NUI degrees. In 1997, the Food Technology Centre was established, with nursing degree programmes commencing in 2002. The college now has undergraduate, postgraduate and part-time courses in Nursing, health sciences and disability studies, home economics and education.

In 2007, St Catherine’s College of Education for Home Economics closed and St Angela's became the sole provider of home economics education in Ireland.

== Administration ==
In 1952, the college was founded with Mother Malachy, a nun, in charge of the institution. In 1958 Mother Brid, also a nun, took over as a principal. Brid served the college until 1983 where Sister Marianne O'Connor was appointed as president, replacing the principal role. In 2001, O'Connor stepped down as President and Michael Hanley served as president until his death in 2004, Dr. Anne Taheny was then appointed president of St Angela's College. In 2019, Tahney retired as president after a 15 year tenure, with Amanda Mc Cloat holding the position of acting President until a successor was appointed. In 2021, Dr Edel McSharry, former head of the school of nursing, took over the role of acting President to be replaced by Dr. Amanda McCloat in 2022.
