= Technological University of the Shannon: Midlands Midwest =

Irish technological university

- Ollscoil Teicneolaíochta na Sionainne: Lár Tíre Iarthar Láir
- Logo of the university
- Other name: TUS
- Type: Public technological university
- Established: 1 October 2021; 4 years ago
- Chair: Josephine Feehily
- President: Vincent Cunnane
- Total staff: 1,200+
- Students: 14,000+
- Location: Ireland; 53°25′3.55″N 7°54′17.79″W
- Colours: Gold and black
- Website: tus.ie

The Technological University of the Shannon: Midlands Midwest (TUS; Irish: Ollscoil Teicneolaíochta na Sionainne: Lár Tíre, an tIarthar Láir, OTS) is a public university in Ireland. It is a technological university, the third such one to be established in Ireland, and opened in October 2021.

The university was the result of a merger between two institutes of technology: the Athlone Institute of Technology (AIT) and the Limerick Institute of Technology (LIT). The AIT-LIT Consortium had been formed due to the passing of the Technological Universities Bill, which required at least two institutes to apply together for university status.

The university officially opened on 1 October 2021 to serve both the midlands and the mid-west regions of the country. It currently has six campuses situated in four counties and three provinces within Ireland. They are located in Limerick, Athlone, Thurles, Clonmel, and Ennis.

== History ==
=== Limerick Institute of Technology ===
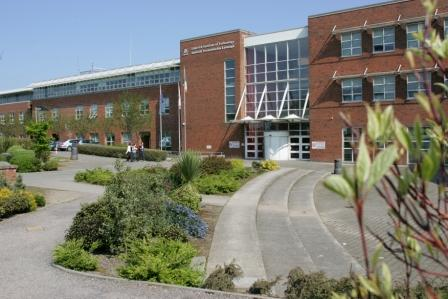
TUS - Limerick campus

The Limerick Institute of Technology (LIT) can trace its roots back to the School of Ornamental Art on Leamy Street, Limerick, on 3 July 1852. This re-opened in 1855 on Cecil Street under the auspices of the Limerick Athenaeum, founded by William Lane Joynt. The Limerick Athenaeum was part of an international movement for the promotion of artistic and scientific learning, started by John Wilson Croker at the Athenaeum Club in London in 1823. This is now the Limerick School of Art & Design, a multi campus Faculty within TUS

For much of the history of the school, it was constituted as the Municipal Technical Institute (known locally as The Red Tech) which was opened in 1910. By the 1970s, it had grown to such a degree that a new campus had to be acquired in Moylish for technical education, with artistic education continuing in a number of locations in the city centre.

The Limerick City Vocational Education Committee (VEC) founded the college in 1975 as the Limerick Technical College. The institute was constituted as the Limerick College of Art, Commerce and Technology (Limerick CoACT) in 1980, became a regional technical college in 1993, and finally an institute of technology in 1997.

In 2012, LIT merged with the Tipperary Institute, which had been founded in 1998. This merger brought two new campus locations in Thurles and Clonmel, as well as increasing the institution's footprint across the region. This footprint was further extended in Clare when the institute introduced degree-level education at its Ennis Learning Centre in 2016. In 2017, the institute was granted planning permission for a new campus at Coonagh in Limerick, to be focused on teaching and research in engineering.

Pat MacDonagh served as head of the college from 1978 through its evolution. He resigned as director in 2003. Dr. Maria Hinfelaar joined in 2004 as president, serving for 11 years. In 2016, Vincent Cunnane was appointed president of the institute.

=== Athlone Institute of Technology ===
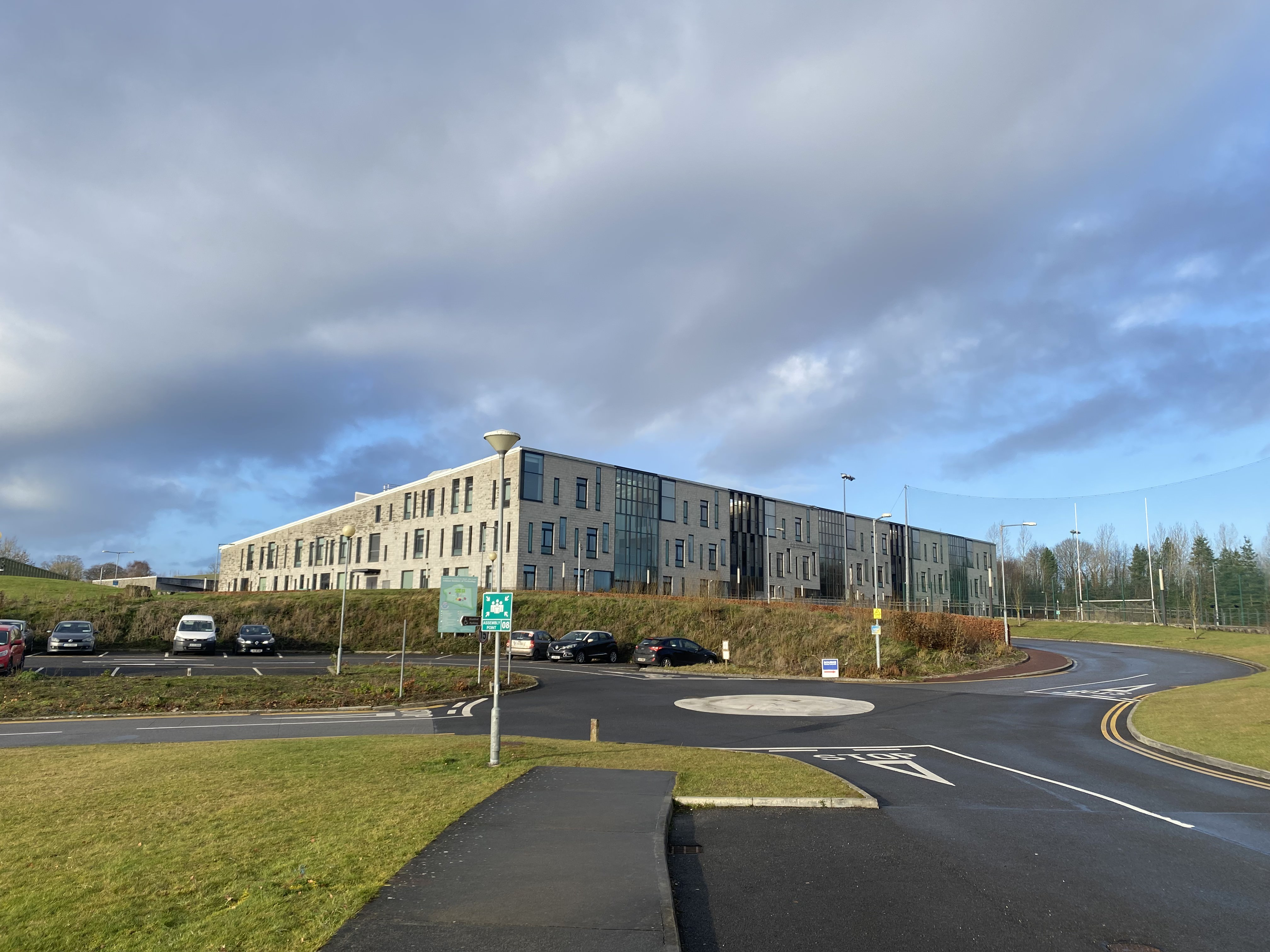
TUS Athlone Engineering & Science Building

The Athlone Institute of Technology (AIT) was established by the Irish Government in 1970 as the Athlone Regional Technical College, under control of the local Vocational Education Committee. The college gained more autonomy with the enactment of the Regional Technical Colleges Act 1992. In late 1997, as with the other RTC's, it was renamed as the Athlone Institute of Technology (AIT). In 1999, AIT became a validation authority with the power to award HETAC degrees.

In 2000, Ciarán Ó Catháin was appointed as the institute's president. Dr. David Fenton and James Coyle were previous holders of the post, having been called director and principal.

The AIT had a campus size of 44 acres, and new, purpose-built facilities that included the Hospitality, Tourism and Leisure Studies building, built in 2003; the Nursing and Health Science building and the Midlands Innovation and Research Centre, built in 2005; as well as the Engineering and Informatics building and the Postgraduate Research Hub, built in 2010.

=== Formation of the AIT-LIT Consortium ===
In 2018, the Athlone IT investigated the possibility of becoming a university in its own right. However, the Technological Universities Bill passed by the Oireachtas earlier that year ruled out that possibility as it declared that two or more institutes must apply together for university status.

A consortium between the Athlone IT and the Limerick IT (ALTU) was formed and announced in October 2019, with the intention of forming a technological university for the mid-west and midlands regions, centred on the River Shannon, with Athlone and Limerick both sitting on it. The objective was to establish a new technical university for central and midwestern Ireland, with a targeted opening date of 1 September 2021.

=== Application and approval ===
On 23 November 2020, the AIT-LIT Consortium announced that the joint Limerick-Athlone IT application for technological university (TU) status had been submitted for approval.

The government approval was officially announced by Minister for Further and Higher Education, Research, Innovation and Science, Simon Harris in May 2021, making it the third technological university to be established in Ireland. On 31 August 2021, it was announced that outgoing LIT president Vincent Cunnane would be appointed as the new technological university's first president.

== Operations ==
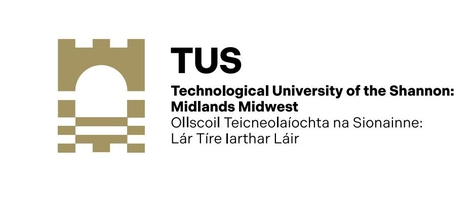
The formal bilingual logo of the university. It includes the full title in English and Irish.

The governing body of Technological University of the Shannon: Midlands Midwest was established to govern the university. The body is chaired by Josephine Feehily, while Vincent Cunnane serves as president. Currently, there is a population of 14,000 students and 1,200 staff members under the university.

The governing body's inaugural meeting took place in April 2022 at the midlands campus in Athlone.

== Research ==
Research activity is concentrated in a number of institutes and centres. The institutes include:

- Irish Digital Engineering and Advanced Manufacturing Institute
- Health and Biosciences Research Institute
- LSAD (Limerick School of Art and Design) Research Institute
- Polymer, Recycling, Industrial, Sustainability and Manufacturing Research Institute (PRISM)
- Irish Digital Engineering and Advanced Manufacturing Institute (IDEAM)
- Health and Life Sciences Research Institute
- Social Science ConneXions
- Software Research Institute

The organisation of these and other centres of research are currently being reviewed.
