= Dundalk Institute of Technology =

Irish institute of technology

- Institiúid Teicneolaíochta Dhún Dealgan
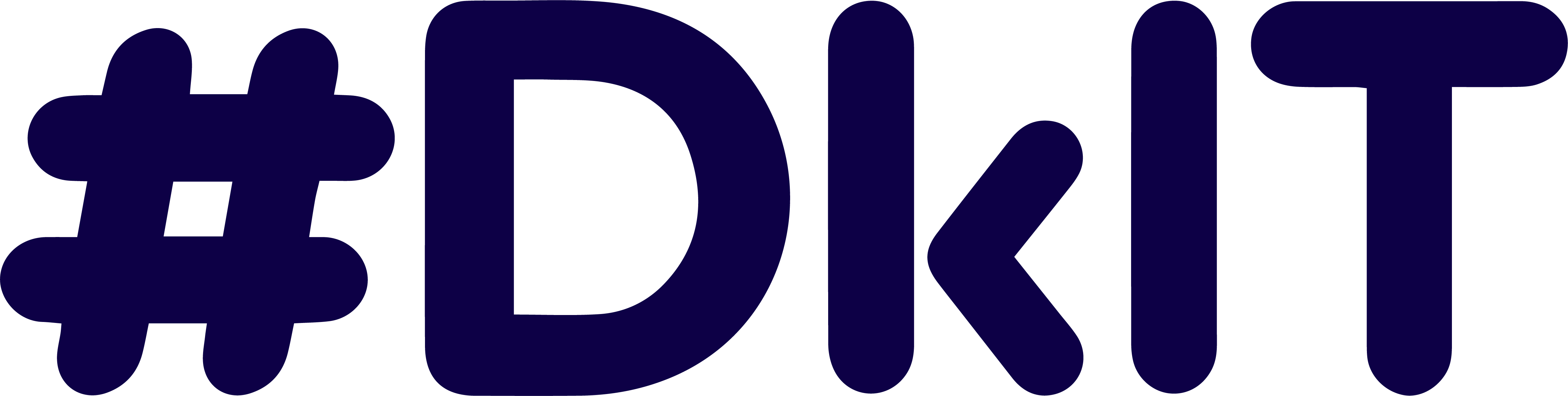
- Established: 1971
- Affiliations: EUA
- Faculty: 500+
- Students: 5,400+
- Location: Dublin Road, Dundalk, Leinster, A91 K584, Ireland; 53.984878°N 6.393992°W
- Campus: 90 acres (360,000 m^{2})
- Website: www.dkit.ie

Dundalk Institute of Technology (DkIT; Irish: Institiúid Teicneolaíochta Dhún Dealgan) is an institute of technology, located in Dundalk, Ireland. Established as the Dundalk Regional Technical College, students were first enrolled in the college in 1971 and it was later re-defined as an institute of technology in January 1998.

As of 2022, the institute has 5,400 students and is equipped with 497 full-time staff.

== History ==
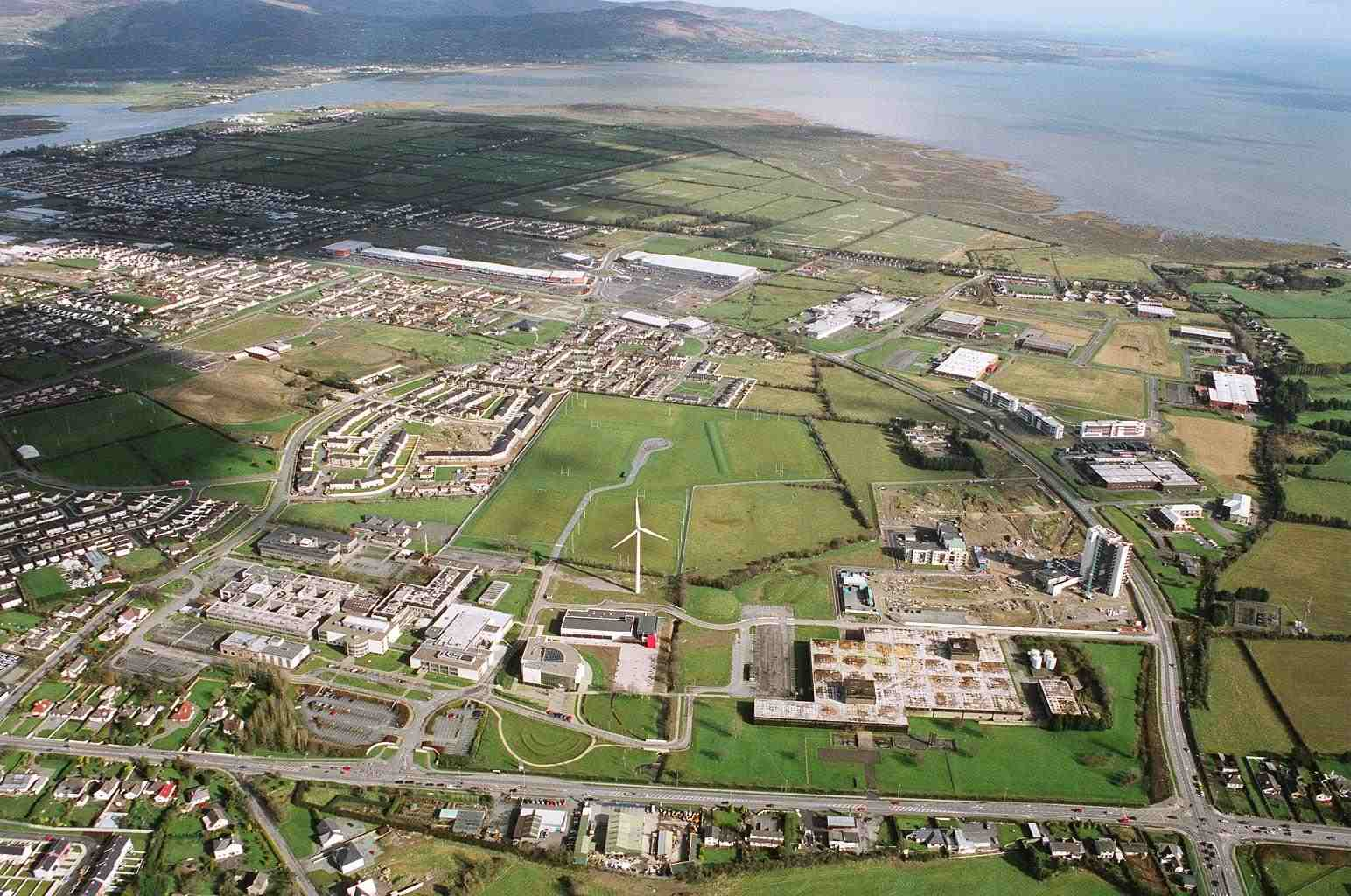
Aerial view of the DkIT Campus

=== Dundalk Regional Technical College (1966–1997) ===
Dundalk Institute of Technology began as Dundalk Regional Technical College. An institute in Dundalk was first envisioned in the Steering Committee on Technical Education Report in 1966, speaking on Dundalk in particular they stated:

We consider that the Regional Colleges fall into three groups … (iii) the other five centres where it has been decided to establish Regional Technical Colleges. We anticipated that the last group would probably not grow industrially as rapidly as group (ii) [Waterford and Galway] although Dundalk and Carlow appeared to us to have greater immediate potential than the other centres in the same group.

The building programme for the regional colleges commenced in 1968, with Dundalk Regional Technical College opening their doors in September 1969, officially opening in 1971. In the late 1990s, all of the technical colleges in the country were redefined as institutes of technology. Dundalk Regional Technical College adopted the name Dundalk Institute of Technology on 28 January 1998.

=== Dundalk Institute of Technology (1997–2026) ===
DkIT's PJ Carroll Building was a building acquired by the Department of Education in 2002 for €16.8m, the building was previously owned by PJ Carroll Tobacco Factory. The architecture firm Scott Tallon Walker were tasked with renovating the building for the college, they were chosen as they originally helped design the building in 1967. Refurbishment and development began in 2005, after partial development, plumbing and electrical trades workshops were relocated into the PJ Carroll Building within a year, along with a digital media editing suite.

By 2010, their refurbishment was completed and the School of Informatics and Creative Arts were also relocated into the PJ Carroll Building. The building officially opened on the 11 February 2011 by the Taoiseach at the time, Brian Cowen. Cowen then stated that:

"For Ireland to achieve its full potential we need a strong skills pool and institutes such as Dundalk (Institute of Technology) are of central importance in equipping people with the skills needed to create and seize emerging opportunities."

Despite being officially opened, the building retains large sections from the original building untouched since the acquisition from PJ Carroll's Tobacco Factory. These areas are not open to students, this encompasses a large section of the former factory and a mezzanine room. The PJ Carroll building is on the Louth County Council's Record of Protected Structures.

In 2005, DkIT opened their new Nursing Building, the glass-fronted building cost €15.5 million and covers 4,000 square meters. This building is the hub for Nursing and Health studies for the college and accommodates over 400 students on a four-year course. The building's facilities include; three clinical labs with a six-bedded ward, a sensory garden, laboratories and an intensive care ward, equipped with dummies.

On 2 October 2020, DkIT established a steering committee aimed to meet the criteria of meeting "Technological University" (TU) status. In May 2021, DkIT announced plans to join an existing TU. The proposal, while not yet formal, has been supported by the Higher Education Authority. By May 2022, DkIT was looking at a merger with an existing TU. In August 2023, the IT confirmed discussions were taking place with Maynooth University with regard to possible collaborations. Another possibility is establishing independent university status with links with colleges in Drogheda, County Monaghan and County Cavan.

=== Queen's University Belfast (2026 onward) ===
In November 2025, it was announced that Dundalk Institute of Technology will become a constituent college of Queen's University Belfast from September 2026, this provides Queen's with its first college campus in the Republic of Ireland.

As of May 2026, DkIT is expected to be reorganized into "Dundalk University College, a College of Queen’s University Belfast", however this is subject to change.

== Structure ==
=== Schools ===
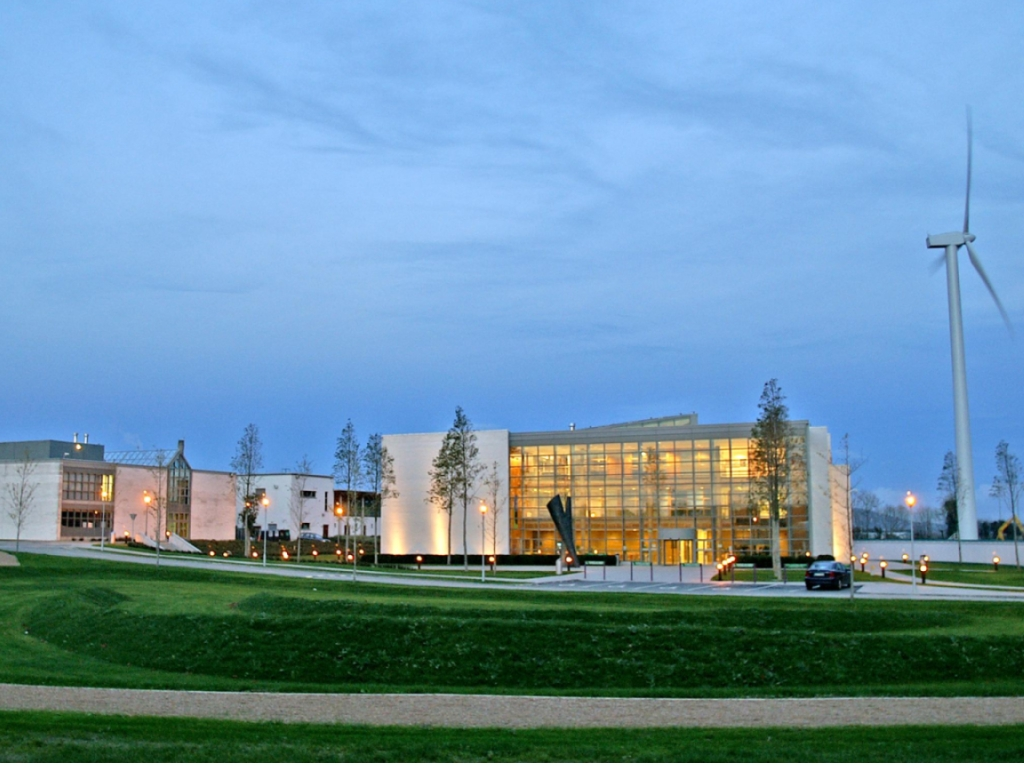
DkIT's Nursing Building in the late evening. There is a wind turbine to the right of the building

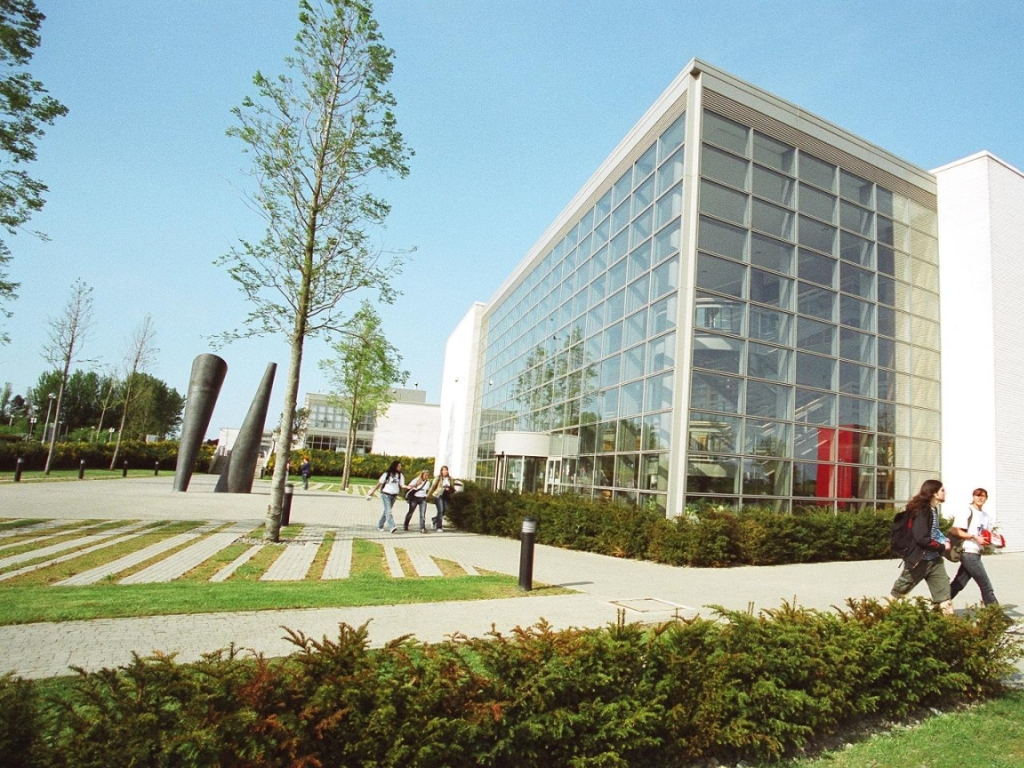
Nursing Building during the day

The institute has four schools, with each one consisting of a number of departments with a wide range of programmes on offer. Additionally, the Lifelong Learning Centre offers many part-time study options and there are also many apprenticeship options on offer, through the School of Engineering.

The four schools at DkIT are:

- School of Business and Humanities
  - Department of Business Studies
  - Department of Hospitality Studies
  - Department of Humanities
  - Department of Management and Financial Studies
- School of Engineering
  - Department of Built Environment
  - Department of Electronic and Mechanical Engineering
  - Department of Engineering Trades and Civil Engineering
- School of Informatics and Creative Arts
  - Department of Computing and Mathematics
  - Department of Creative Arts, Media and Music
  - Department of Visual and Human-Centred Computing
- School of Health and Science
  - Department of Agriculture, Food & Animal Health
  - Department of Life and Health Sciences
  - Department of Nursing, Midwifery and Early Years

=== Governance ===
The chairperson of the Governing Body from 2020 to 2023 was Patrick W. Malone. The previous chairpersons were Andrew Griffith, Joanna Gardiner and Clifford Kelly. Professor Tom Collins was appointed chairperson in November 2023.

The previous presidents/directors/principals have been Dr Seán McDonagh (1971-2001), Denis Murphy (acting 1997–1999), Gerry Carroll (acting 2000–2001), Dr Tom Collins (2001-2005), Denis Cummins (2005–2016), Ann Campbell (acting 2016–2017), Dr Michael Mulvey (2017- 2022) and Dr Gerard (Bob) McKiernan (acting 2022). The current president is Dr Diarmuid O'Callaghan.

=== Lifelong Learning Centre ===
The Lifelong Learning Centre coordinates a range of courses for approximately 1,000 part-time students. The students take courses in all four academic schools. The majority of the courses are accredited by external bodies. About two thirds of the students come from outside County Louth.

=== Regional Development Centre ===
Established in 1989 by DkIT, the Regional Development Centre acts as the institute's Innovation Support and Technology Transfer organisation. The centre acts as a commercially oriented interface between DkIT and the industrial, commercial and business life of the region, and makes available the expertise, facilities and resources of the institute for the wider benefit of the regional economy.

Through the Research and Developmental endeavours of its Academic Staff, the institute has developed an applied R&D reputation in Software Development, Electronics and Engineering Design, Applied Humanities, Cultural Studies and Enterprise Development & Innovation along with in the field of Renewable Energy and Digital Media.

The DkIT Regional Development Centre has been awarded the ISO 9001-2000 Quality Standard.

== Library ==
The library at DkIT Institute of Technology (DkIT) is located in the Whitaker building. The facility provides learning and research support to 5,000 + students and staff with 400 study spaces, over 50,000 books and journals and access to a range of online databases.

There are 100 PCs for project and research work as well as wireless internet access on two floors. The library's collection is mainly academic to support DkIT's undergraduate and postgraduate programmes. There is also a fiction collection as well as films on DVD and music CDs.

The library building was named after T. K. Whitaker, in recognition of his contribution to the Irish economy. Books donated by him are available for consultation in the TK Whitaker collection. The library was renamed the de Chastelain library in 2019. This was in honour of the retired General John de Chastelain for his involvement in the Northern Ireland Peace Process.

== Research ==
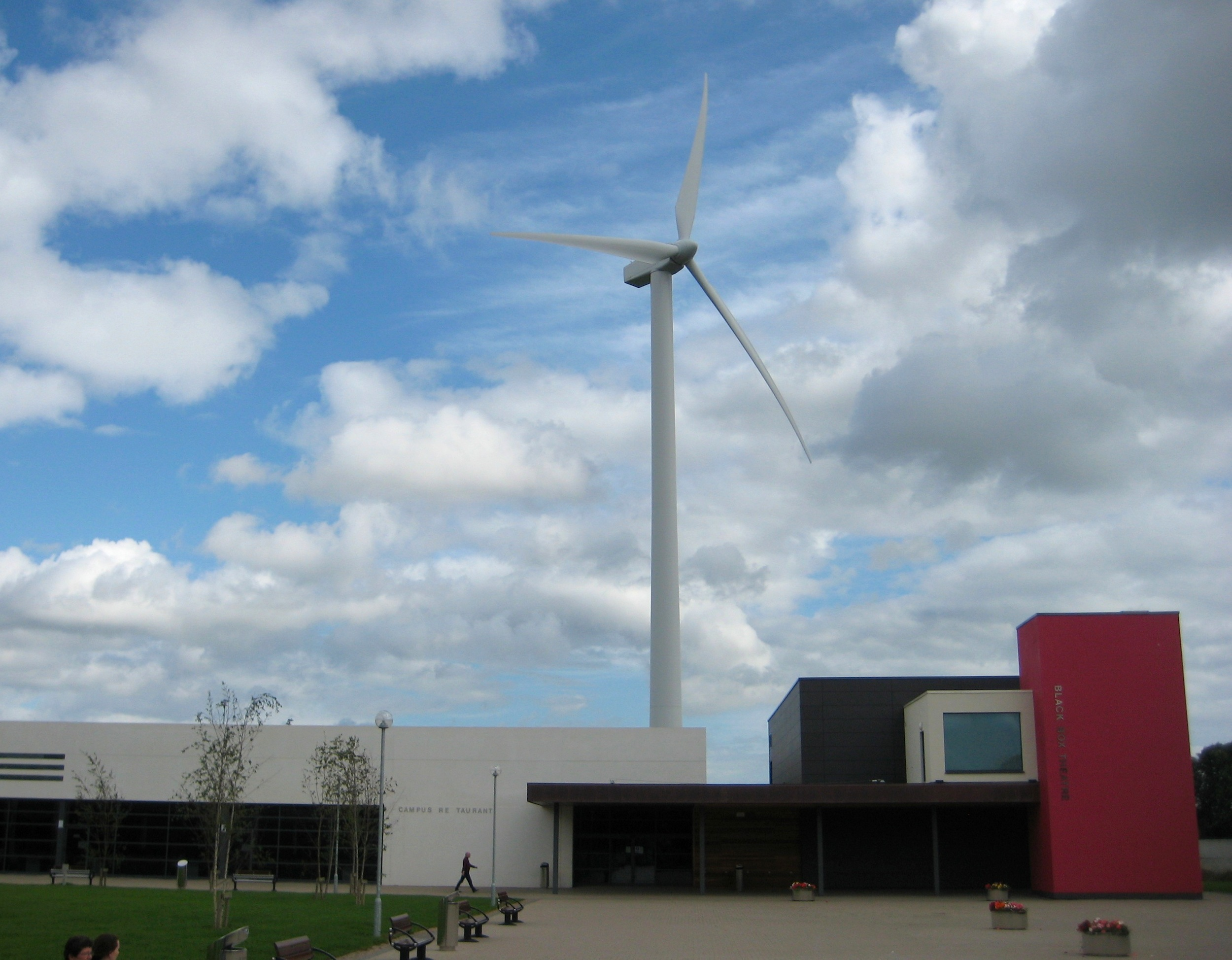
The Campus Restaurant, Mac Anna Theatre and wind turbine

Researchers within the institute carry out internationally recognised research within several key thematic areas:

- ICT, Health and Ageing
  - Smooth Muscle Research Group
  - NetwellCASALA - Social Networks, Environments and Technologies for wellness and ageing-in-place
  - Regulated Software Research Centre
- Energy and Environment
  - Centre for Renewables and Energy
  - Centre for Fresh Water and Environmental Studies
  - Electrochemistry Research Group
- Creative Arts
  - Creative Arts Practice
  - Media, Culture, Gaming, Community and Society
  - Creative Industries and Future Technologies
  - Musicology and Ethnomusicology
  - Creative and Aesthetic Pedagogies

== Irish language ==
The institute's "Irish Language Scheme", the first of a series of three-year schemes under Acht na dTeangacha Oifigiúla (The Official Languages Act) 2003, came into effect on 18 October 2010. The institute established Oifig na Gaeilge to aid in the implementation of the scheme and to coordinate a range of activities promoting the use of the Irish language within the institute. This office opened on a part-time basis at the start of 2011 and is based in the PJ Carroll Building.
