= Higher Education Authority =

Statutory body in Ireland

- An tÚdarás um Ard-Oideachas
- Abbreviation: HEA
- Type: Statutory body
- Headquarters: 3 Shelbourne Buildings, Crampton Avenue, Shelbourne Road, Ballsbridge, Dublin 4, Ireland
- Chief Executive Officer: Dr Alan Wall
- Chairperson: Professor Mark Rogers
- Website: hea.ie

The Higher Education Authority (HEA), officially An tÚdarás um Ard-Oideachas, is the statutory body responsible for the governance and regulation of higher education in Ireland. It provides policy advice to the Government of Ireland and allocates public funding to universities, technological universities and other higher education institutions.

== History ==
The HEA was established under the Higher Education Authority Act 1971. Its official Irish language name is An tÚdarás um Ard-Oideachas. The 1971 Act was repealed and replaced by the Higher Education Authority Act 2022, with the HEA continuing in operation under the 2022 Act.

The HEA was responsible for administering the Programme for Research in Third Level Institutions (PRTLI), which provided funding for research from 1998 to around 2018.

== Description and functions ==
The HEA has statutory responsibility, at central government level, for the effective governance and regulation of higher education institutions and the higher education system. It provides policy advice to the Government of Ireland across various aspects of higher education and leads the strategic development of the Irish higher education and research system.

The authority is responsible for the allocation of exchequer funding to Irish universities, technological universities, institutes of technology and other higher education institutions. Most of the grants allocated by the HEA are recurrent grants for the ongoing running costs of institutions, while the authority also allocates capital funding for buildings and equipment in agreement with the relevant government department.

In 2024, the HEA allocated and paid €1.78 billion to higher education institutions and other funded bodies, and disbursed approximately €193 million in capital funding across the higher education sector.

The HEA is the Irish National Agency for the Erasmus+ programme in higher education in Ireland.

Under the Higher Education Authority Act 2022, the HEA has functions in relation to designated institutions of higher education, including universities, technological universities, institutes of technology and certain other higher education providers.

== Governance and oversight ==
The Higher Education Authority Act 2022 provides for changes to the functions and governance of the HEA and to its oversight of designated higher education institutions. The HEA operates a governance oversight framework for higher education institutions, including assurance processes relating to legislation, government circulars and the Code of Practice for the Governance of State Bodies.

As of July 2022, the Chief Executive is Dr Alan Wall. Professor Mark Rogers was appointed Chairperson of the HEA on 12 September 2025. He had previously served as an ordinary member of the HEA Board from 10 November 2023.

== Strategy and performance ==
The HEA oversees institutional performance through the System Performance Framework and a Strategy and Performance Dialogue process with higher education institutions. The System Performance Framework 2023–2028 sets out parameters under which designated institutions identify their contribution to institutional and national strategy, according to their mission, scale, location and strategic plan.

Performance agreements under the Strategy and Performance Dialogue process span the period from September 2024 to August 2028, with institutional reporting and review taking place in 2025, 2026, 2027 and 2028.

== Data and statistics ==
The HEA collects and publishes statistics on higher education in Ireland, including data on student enrolments, graduate outcomes and institutional performance. According to HEA statistics, total enrolments in higher education increased by 14.8% between 2017/18 and 2023/24, from approximately 231,710 to approximately 265,905.

== Headquarters ==
The HEA is headquartered at 3 Shelbourne Buildings, Crampton Avenue, Shelbourne Road, Ballsbridge, Dublin 4.

== See also ==
- Education in the Republic of Ireland
- List of universities in the Republic of Ireland
- State agencies of the Republic of Ireland
- Irish Research Council
