= List of further education colleges in the Republic of Ireland =

This is a list of further education colleges in the Republic of Ireland:

== A ==
- Abbey Vocational School
- Accounting Technicians Ireland
- Athlone Community College

== B ==
- Ballsbridge College of Further Education
- Ballyfermot College of Further Education
- Blackrock Further Education Institute
- Bray Institute of Further Education
- Bridgetown Vocational College

== C ==
- Carndonagh Community School
- Castlebar Further of Education
- Cathal Brugha FET College
- Cavan Institute
- Chevron Online Training
- Coláiste Chathail Naofa
- Coláiste Dhulaigh College of Further Education
- Coláiste Íde College of Further Education
- Coláiste na hÉireann
- Coláiste Stiofáin Naofa College of Further Education
- College of Progressive Education
- Collinstown Park Community College
- Confey College
- Cork College of Commerce
- Cork College of FET

== D ==
- Digital Marketing Institute
- Dorset College
- Drogheda Institute of Further Education
- Dublin City University
- Dublin Institute of Technology
- Dunboyne College of Further Education
- Dundrum College of Further Education

== E ==
- ECM: European College of Management

== G ==
- Galway Business School
- Galway Technical Institute
- Glenamaddy Community School
- Gorey Community School
- Gurteen College

== I ==
- Inchicore College of Further Education
- Independent College Dublin

== K ==
- Killester College
- Kylemore College

== L ==
- Liberties College
- Limerick College of Further Education

== M ==
- Mallow College of Further Education
- Marian College
- Marino College of Further Education
- Moate Business College
- Monaghan Institute

== N ==
- North Strand FET Campus

== O ==
- Ormonde College

== P ==
- Plunket College of Further Education

== R ==
- Rathmines College of Further Education
- Ringsend Technical Institute

== S ==
- Sancta Maria College
- Setanta College
- St. Brendan's College
- St. John's Central College
- St. Oliver Post Primary School

== T ==
- Tralee Community College

== W ==
- Warnborough College
- Waterford College of Further Education
- Westport CFE - Carrowbeg College

== See also ==
- List of further education colleges in England
- List of further education colleges in Scotland
- List of further education colleges in Wales
