= Galway Community College =

- Coláiste Pobail na Gaillimhe

Location
- Wellpark Rd. Galway; H91 K642; Ireland; 53°16′58.98″N 9°1′58.86″W

Information
- Religious affiliation: Inter-denominational
- Established: September 1969
- Educational authority: Galway and Roscommon ETB
- Principal: Brian Melia
- Enrollment: 454

Galway Community College (GCC; Irish: Coláiste Pobail na Gaillimhe) is a school located in Wellpark, Galway. GCC functions both as a secondary school and as a further education institution, offering full-time and part-time courses accredited by QQI at levels 5 and 6. As of 2025, it was delivering education to 454 students.

== History ==
In 2022, it was announced that GCC's parent organisation GRETB had been awarded €77 million to be spent in the construction of a new building adjacent to the school, intended to serve as a new building for Galway Technical Institute. The two institutions, alongside Youthreach, Galway Adult Basic Education, and other GRETB organisations, are intended to form an amalgamated campus for the board's constituent services.

== See also ==
- Education in the Republic of Ireland
- List of further education colleges in the Republic of Ireland
