= St. John's Central College =

Further education college in the City of Cork, Ireland

- Lár Choláiste Eoin
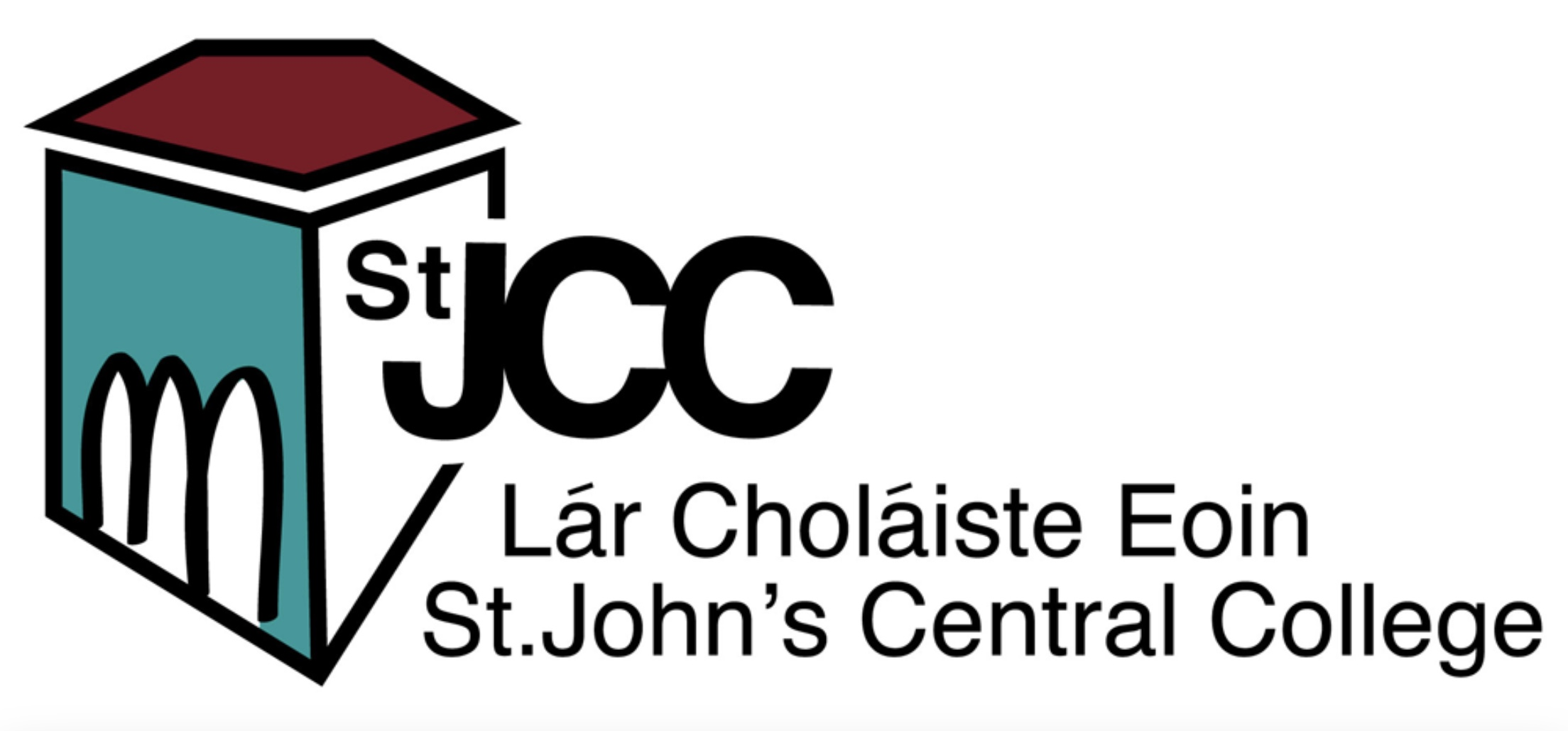
- Former names: The School of Building and Junior Technical Institute
- Principal: Paula McCarthy
- Students: 800
- Location: Sawmill Street, Cork City, Ireland
- Website: www.stjohnscollege.ie

St. John's Central College (Irish: Lár Choláiste Eoin) is a further education college in Cork City, Ireland. The college is administered by the Cork Education and Training Board.

== History of St. John's Central College ==
=== 19th Century ===
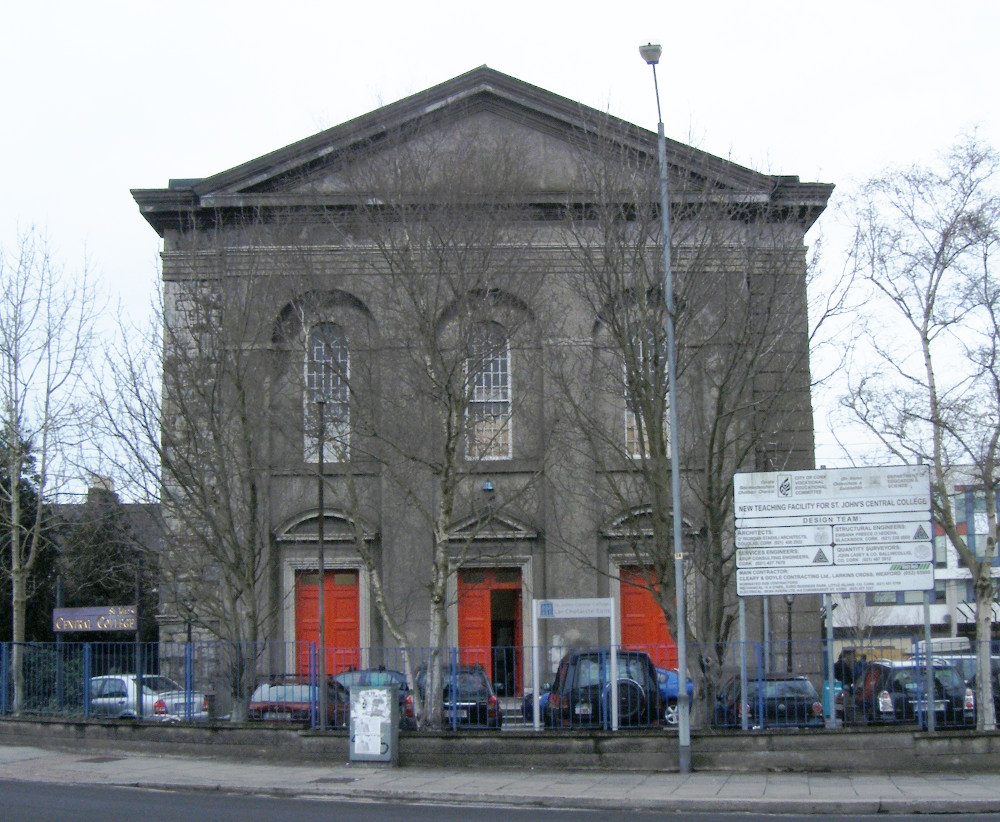
The formerly named St. John's Episcopalian church currently houses classrooms, and features as the College's logo.

The earliest part of the college is St. John's Episcopalian church, which was built in 1840. The church was used by the local community, which included young women from the Governesses Seminary in Warren Place.

A second building on Sawmill Street, Buckingham House, was built in the mid 19th Century, and was used as a female refuge and penitentiary until its closure in 1901. The building was then occupied by the Buckingham House Free School, an orphanage that had operated since 1875.

=== 1950s to 1960s ===
St. John's Episcopalian church was sold to the City of Cork VEC on 11 June 1963 for IR£19,885. Buckingham House ran until 1958 when it was sold to the City of Cork VEC for IR£13,100.

In 1961, The School of Building and Junior Technical Institute commenced its classes. The college was aimed at vocational training, and included a School of Furniture, built in 1963.

=== 1980s to 1990s ===
The college saw declining pupil numbers during the 1980s, and moved to teach Post Leaving Certificate courses.

=== 2000s ===
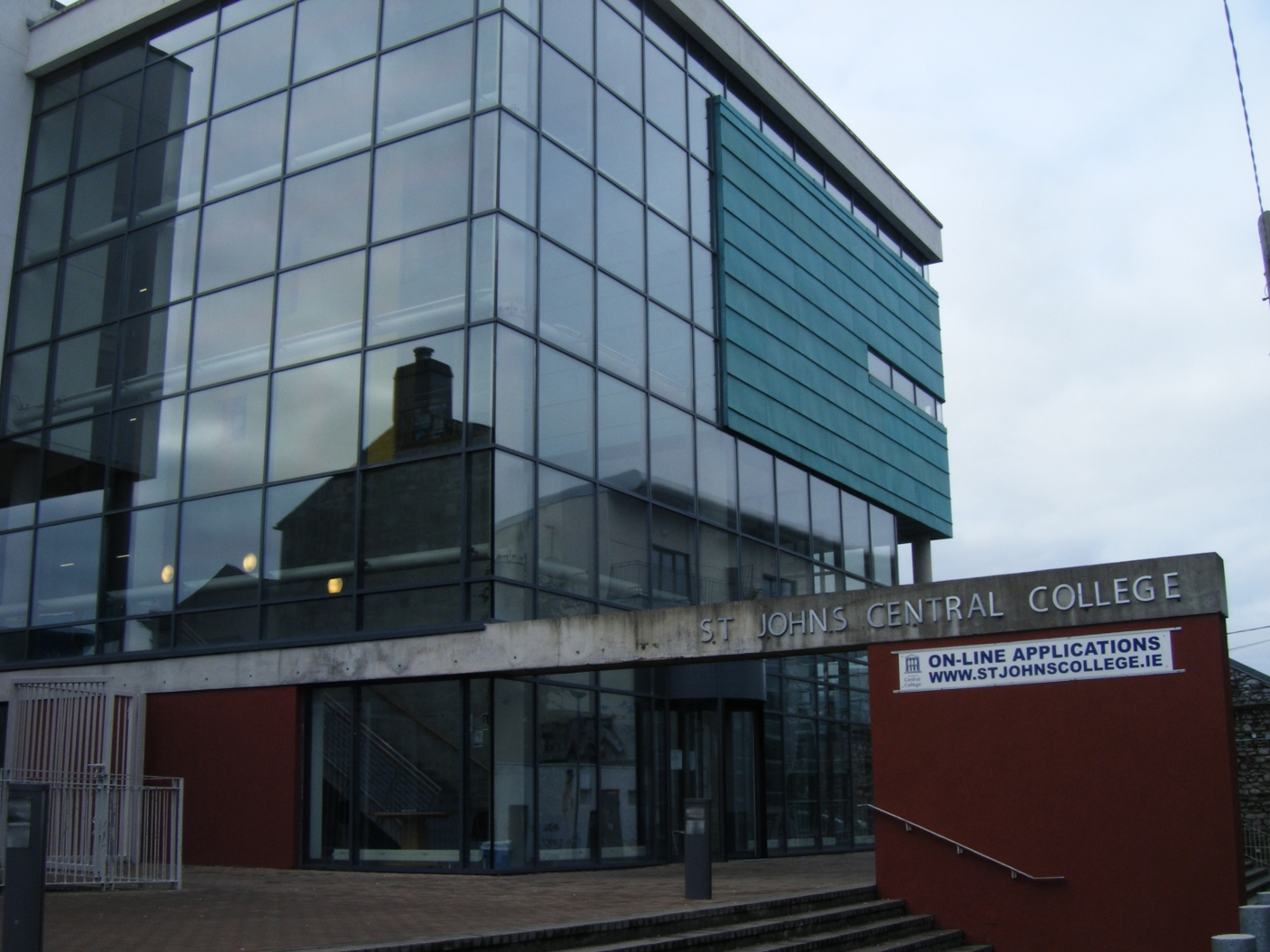
The new building constructed in 2003

In 2003 the college had over 1000 students enrolled in its courses. To keep up with this demand, the original wall of the female refuge and penitentiary on Sawmill Street were demolished, as well as classrooms constructed during the mid 1960s. In their place was constructed a new four story, 5200 square metre teaching facility.

== Courses ==
St. John's Central College offers both academic, vocational, apprenticeship and pre apprenticeship courses. Full time courses include Applied Sciences, Art & Design, Construction & Engineering, Information Technology, Media Technology, Software Engineering and Services. all of which have routes into Higher education. Vocational courses on offer include motor maintenance, Environmental science and hairdressing.

=== Full Time Day Courses ===
==== Applied Sciences ====
Veterinary Nursing L5

Canine Husbandry L5

Companion & Captive Animal Studies L5

Veterinary Nursing L6

Animal Science and Management L6

Science & Laboratory Techniques L5

Science with Environmental Studies L5

==== Art & Design ====
Art, Craft & Design L5

Fine Art – Painting and Sculpture L6

Cartoon Animation L5

Cartoon Animation L6

Creative Technology & Art L5

Fashion Design L5

Fashion Design L6

Fashion Design & Media L5

Graphic Design & Illustration L5

Illustration L6

Interior Architecture & Design L5

Interior Architecture & Design L6

Interior Architecture & Design HNC L6

Interior Architecture & Design HND L6

Jewellery Making & Art Metalcraft L5

Jewellery Making & Art Metalcraft L6

==== Construction & Engineering ====
Architectural 3D Modelling BIM REVIT L5

Furniture Making & Restoration Skills L5

Engineering Technology L5

Motor Maintenance & Light Engineering L5

Motorcycle & Small Engine Maintenance L5

Musical Instrument Making & Repair L5

Musical Instrument Making & Repair L6

==== Information Technology ====
Applied Computer Training Course L5

Computers & Business Applications L5

Computers & Business Applications L6

Computer Game Design & Development L5

Computer Game Design & Development L6

Cloud Computing with Coding L5

Cloud Computing with Coding L6

Networks & Cyber Security L5

Networks & Cyber Security L6

New Directions IT Skills Development L4 – Part time

Software Development L5

==== Media Technology ====
Film, TV and Video Production L5

Advanced Film, TV & Video Production L6

Creative Digital Media L5

Creative Digital Media L6

Photographic Studies L5

Photographic Studies L6

Soundtracks & Sound Design L5

==== Services ====
Tourism, Travel with Business L5

Tourism, Travel with Business L6

Hairdressing & Barbering L5

Barbering & Salon Management L6

Pharmacy Assistant L5

== Facilities ==
The college includes many modern teaching facilities, including a laboratory, dark room, art studios, hair dressing studio and tool workshops.

=== Information Resource Centre (IRC) ===
The Information Resource Centre at St. Johns contains many books designed to help students with their courses. The IRC also includes computers where students can research on the internet, or access the library's online catalogue. Students can also download their course and lesson notes, in a pilot scheme designed to help students access their college work online.

== See also ==
- Education in the Republic of Ireland
- List of further education colleges in the Republic of Ireland
- Education in Cork
