= Rathmines College of Further Education =

Coordinates: 53.324°N 6.265°W

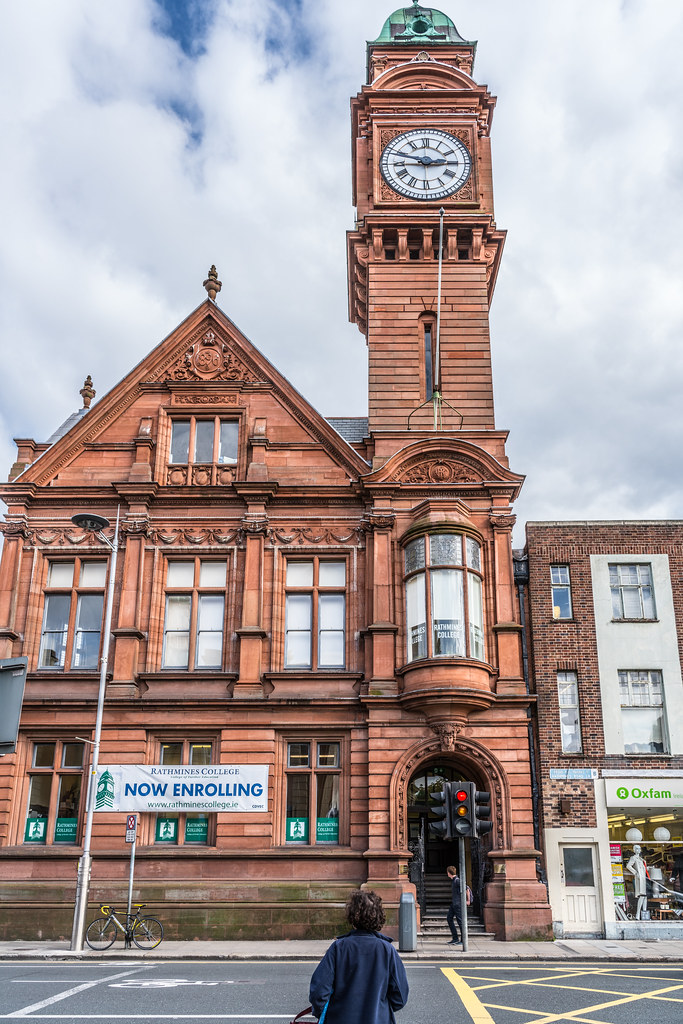
- Motto: "Go further"
- Type: College of Further Education
- Principal: Anna Morris
- Location: Rathmines, Dublin, Ireland
- Website: www.rathminescollege.ie

Rathmines College is an educational institution in Rathmines, Dublin, Ireland. The college offers several Further Education courses in areas not limited to accounting, business, computing, media studies, and office administration.

== History ==
The college was established by Rathmines Urban District Council as the Rathmines Municipal Technical Institute at 24 Rathmines Road in 1901. It was renamed the College of Commerce, Rathmines in 1936, and relocated to Rathmines Town Hall in 1980. In 1978, at the Annual Congress of Trade Unions, the then College of Commerce put forward an amendment to reject the motion of support of the "inalienable rights of the Palestinian people to establish a unitary democratic secular state in Palestine", but the motion was "overwhelmingly defeated". The higher-level degree programmes became part of the Dublin Institute of Technology in 1992 under the DIT Act.

== Campus locations ==
The college has two campuses in Rathmines, the first in the former Rathmines Town Hall and the second in two period houses at 28-29 Leinster Road.

Rathmines College operates under the patronage of the City of Dublin Education and Training Board (City of Dublin ETB), known as the City of Dublin Vocational Education Committee (CDVEC) prior to 2013.

== Academics and qualifications ==
Rathmines College offers qualifications at levels 5 and 6 on Ireland's National Framework of Qualifications (NFQ). These courses are accredited by the Quality and Qualifications Ireland ("QQI"), and by the Business and Technology Education Council ("BTEC").

=== Partnerships in Education ===
Among its accounting programmes are the Accounting Technicians Ireland (ATI) Certificate, Diploma and Apprenticeship courses, the Association of Chartered Certified Accountants (ACCA) Certified Accounting Technician and the Advanced Diploma in Accounting and Business ACCA Award.

The college also offers a one-year repeat leaving certificate course.

== See also ==
- Education in the Republic of Ireland
- List of further education colleges in the Republic of Ireland
