= Collinstown Park Community College =

College in County Dublin, Ireland

- Motto: Encourage Inspire Enrich
- Type: PLC, Post-primary, vocational
- Principal: Áine McGrath
- Location: Neilstown Road, Clondalkin, South Dublin, 22, Ireland; 53.341°N 6.396°W
- Campus: Urban
- Website: www.collinstownpark.ie

Collinstown Park Community College is an Irish training college that provides post-primary and further education. It is located in Clondalkin, South Dublin in Ireland. The college was established in 1984.

== History ==
Collinstown Park Community College was established in 1984 to serve the Neilstown and Rowlagh communities of Clondalkin, South Dublin, after a NCO study revealed that no one in this area had a third level qualification and Leaving Certificates were uncommon. In addition, the Irish government had identified Clondakin as one of the 45 most disadvantaged urban areas in Ireland. No tuition is charged to attend the college.

The college opened in September 1984. By March 1988, it was one of the fastest growing schools in Ireland, with 697 students. In November 1991, it had 870 students.

Collinstown Park Community College won the Making Our Country Poverty Free challenge for its promect "Early School Leaving – What's Your Story?" at the 2007Young Social Innovators National Showcase.

== Campus ==
Collinstown Park Community College is located on Neilstown Road in Clondalkin, South Dublin. The campus includes a large assembly hall and a physcial education hall. The college is adjacent to a thirty-acre public park.

== Academics ==
Collinstown Park Community College is a post-primary and further education training college. It offers programs leading to a Junior Certificate, Leaving Certificate and Post Leaving Certificates. It also prepares students for FETAC Certificate examinations.

The college has second level programs for the junior cycle, including a Junior Certificate Programme and a Junior Certificate Schools Programme. For the senior cycle, the college's programs include the Leaving Certificate, the Leaving Certificate Applied Programme, and the Leaving Certificate Vocational Programme. The college also has a Transition Year Programme, a School Completion Program, and various courses for adult learners.

Subjects offered for the intermediate and group certificates include art, commerce, French, home economics, humanities (English, geography, and history), Irish, maths, metalwork, music, physical education, religion, science, technical drawing, and woodwork.

== Students ==
In March 2007, Collinstown Park Community College had 810 students. It had 520 twelve to eighteen year-olds enrolled in its Leaving Certificate program. It also had 90 full-time and 200 part-time mature students who were studying for FETAC Certificate examinations. The college is co-educational and multi-denominational. All applicants are accepted.

== Governance and staff ==
Collinstown Park Community College is governed by a local Board of Management that is authorized by the Dublin & Dun Laoghaire Education and Training Board, which replaced the City of Dublin Vocational Education Committee (CDVEC) in 2013. In March 2007, the college had a staff of 99. Its principal is Áine McGrath.

== Extra-curricular activities ==
Collinstown Park Community College has a Cumann Gaelach club as well as clubs for jobs, music, photography and pottery. In the 1980s, the school also had an "Outward Pursuit" group for hiking, nature study, orienteering and walking.

Sports at Collinstown Park Community College include basketball, camogie, cross country, football, men's and women's Gaelic football, and volleyball. Its athletic team is known as the Allen Gaels. The Gaelic football team won the Leitrim County title in 1991 and the Dublin Championship in 1988.

== Notable people ==
=== Alumni ===
- Bernard Dunne, boxer
- Kenneth Egan, member of the South Dublin County Council; boxer who won a silver medal at the 2008 Summer Olympics
- Roy Kean, professional association football player and coach

=== Faculty ===
- Shane Dooley, hurler and gaelic footballer

== See also ==
- Education in Ireland
- List of further education colleges in Ireland
