= Cavan Institute =

- Institiúid an Chabháin
- Former names: Cavan College of Further Studies
- Established: 1985
- Affiliations: FETAC, QQI, IATI, IT Sligo
- Principal: Dr Niall McVeigh
- Students: 1,400 (Full Time); 600 (Part Time)
- Location: Cavan, County Cavan
- Website: http://www.cavaninstitute.ie

Cavan Institute (previously Cavan College of Further Studies) is a third level college located in the town of Cavan in the Republic of Ireland. The college's main locations are at several locations in the town and at the former Army Barracks on the Dublin Road, which was purchased by County Cavan VEC and opened in 2023.

The Institute has been a registered provider of Further Education and Training Awards Council (FETAC) Courses since 2006. It offers FETAC awards to all students, with some courses also offering Business and Technology Education Council (BTEC) awards. Overall the Institute offers over 70 post-leaving certificate courses.

== Schools ==
It has numerous courses on offer in its five schools, including:

- Accounting Technician
- Business & Humanities
- Healthcare, Sport & Education
- Beauty Therapy & Hairdressing
- Computing, Engineering & Science
- Design, Performing Arts & Services

The majority of students are from County Cavan, with a large proportion of other students coming from counties Leitrim, Roscommon, Monaghan, Meath and Westmeath.

Courses offered are accredited by the Confederation of International Beauty Therapy and Cosmetology (CIBTAC), Comité International d’Esthetique et de Cosmetologie (CIDESCO), International Therapy Examination Council (ITEC), International Academy of Travel (IAOT), Institute of Public Administration (IPA), and Cisco Systems.

== Links to Institutes of Technology ==
The Cavan Institute has a number of Memoranda of Understanding with Institutes of Technology. Students can do year 1 of a BSc Level 7 course with IT Sligo, at the Cavan Institute, also year 1 of the BSc and BSc in Computing at Letterkenny Institute of Technology, year 1 of the level 6 of both Business and Applied Social Studies and Social Care with Athlone Institute of Technology and Years 1 and 2 of QQI Level 8 BA in Early Childhood Studies with the School of Lifelong Learning at Dundalk Institute of Technology.

== See also ==
- Education in the Republic of Ireland
- List of further education colleges in the Republic of Ireland
