= Murphy v County Wexford VEC =

2004 Irish Supreme Court case

- Coat of arms of Ireland
- Court: Supreme Court of Ireland
- Full case name: Kenneth Murphy v. County Wexford VEC
- Decided: 29 July 2004
- Citation: [2004] IESC 49; [2004] 4 I.R. 202
- Transcript: https://www.bailii.org/ie/cases/IESC/2004/49.html

Case history
- Appealed from: High Court
- Appealed to: Supreme Court

Court membership
- Judges sitting: McGuinness J. Fennelly J., McCracken J.

Case opinions
- School Authorities owe a duty to those pupils to take reasonable care to ensure that the pupils do not suffer injury
- Decision by: McCracken J.
- Concurrence: McGuinness J., McCracken J.
- Concur/dissent: Fennelly J,
- Dissent: Fennelly J.

Keywords
- Personal Injuries, liability, Duty of care

Murphy v County Wexford VEC [2004] IESC 49; [2004] 4 IR 202 is an Irish Supreme Court case concerning a personal injury case appealed to the Supreme Court from the High Court. The plaintiff suffered serious injuries as a result of "horseplay." The Court held there was a duty of care on the VEC to provide supervision at lunchtime." Despite having implemented steps to control such behaviour, it was found that the defendants/appellants failed in their obligations towards the plaintiff/respondent.

The court found the extent of supervision would depend on different factors, including:

1. the age of the pupils;
2. the place where they gather;
3. the number of students present; and
4. the likelihood that students may act dangerously.

The courts have said that schools can have physical sports and games as long as the games are risk-assessed, guided, and the right instructions are given.

The cases that have been brought before the courts show how important it is for schools to do risk assessments for things their students do at school. These reviews should list all risks that the school thinks are likely and include a plan for how to deal with them. If an expert opinion as to the suitability of any particular equipment or game is required, this should be asked for.

Schools should also make sure that there is enough guidance, taking into account the age of the students and the activity that will be carried out. If the school has a schedule for keeping an eye on the pupils, it should be followed strictly.

== Background ==
=== Facts ===
De Valera J. heard the case in the High Court and awarded Mr. Murphy €50,000 for an injury he suffered at school. From the evidence, it looked like a classmate had brought in chocolate bars, which led to horse play where the bars were thrown across the fifth and sixth-year area. De Valera J. said that the amount of time this teasing had gone on for was a bit too long. On the day of the incident, the appellants had not been keeping an eye on anything in the area where it happened. County Wexford VEC asked for a direction, and the trial judge had little choice but to hold for Mr. Murphy because there was no explanation for the lack of supervision, even though there was a supervisory rota for teachers.

The trial judge gave significant weight to the school's failure to provide any justification for departing from the timetable that it had determined was necessary to fulfill its duty of care. The Supreme Court rejected the argument that "de Valera J. used certain language that may be interpreted as implying that the school was responsible because it had disregarded the standard of care that it had established by its decision to adopt the timetable."

==== Duty of Care ====
It was noteworthy that both parties accepted that the school owed a duty of care. That duty of care, lined up with that set out in Lennon v. McCarthy & Anor where Ó Dálaigh C.J. said that "the duty of a school master is to take such care of his pupils as a careful father would of his children." However, when normally healthy children are in the playground, it is not necessary that they be under constant supervision.

In this instance, to Ó Dálaigh CJ.'s reference is that the standard of care that is expected of the teachers was discussed by the Supreme Court, where the parties conceded that teachers are to be held to a standard based on a reasonable person in loco parentis, rather than that of a reasonable teacher.

== Holding of the Supreme Court ==
With McGuinness J.'s agreement, McCracken J. rejected the appeal and upheld de Valera J.'s judgement. Nonetheless, the court emphasised that the trial judge must make his decision based only on the facts at hand and not on any potential concessions made by the respondent's counsel when the matter was first filed. When it came to discipline, that school had severe problems. The Court acknowledged this by highlighting the requirement that teachers be added to a roster for supervision. The learned Supreme Court Judge stated in his decision that given the circumstances of the case and the school's history of indiscipline, the appellants had a duty of care to provide supervision at lunchtime in accordance with the rota system, and that their failure to do so constituted negligence on their part. He was also satisfied that there was no contributory negligence on the part of the plaintiff or respondent.

== Dissent of Fennelly J. ==
Fennelly J. believed that a retrial should have taken place, that the High Court Judge completely ignored the proper legal standard of care, and that the judge did not decide the case in line with the arguments. The issue, according to Fennelly J., is not what the appellants thought essential, but rather what is actually required to uphold the appellants' duty of care. The court did state, however, that it was clear from the evidence that nobody had been keeping an eye on the refuge area on that specific day. He then cited the plaintiffs' testimony on the supervision system, saying that everyone was aware that if they did anything wrong a teacher would be on their backs in a matter of minutes or seconds.

He said that instead of the high court's decision, he would let the appeal go through and order a new trial.

== Subsequent developments ==
In the High Court case Maher (A Minor) v Presentation School Mullingar, this case was distinguished. In this case, Peart J. said that the level of supervision needed for a class of six-year-olds is higher because they are so young, and that the level of supervision needed for older children is lower.
