= Niall McCabe =

Irish footballer

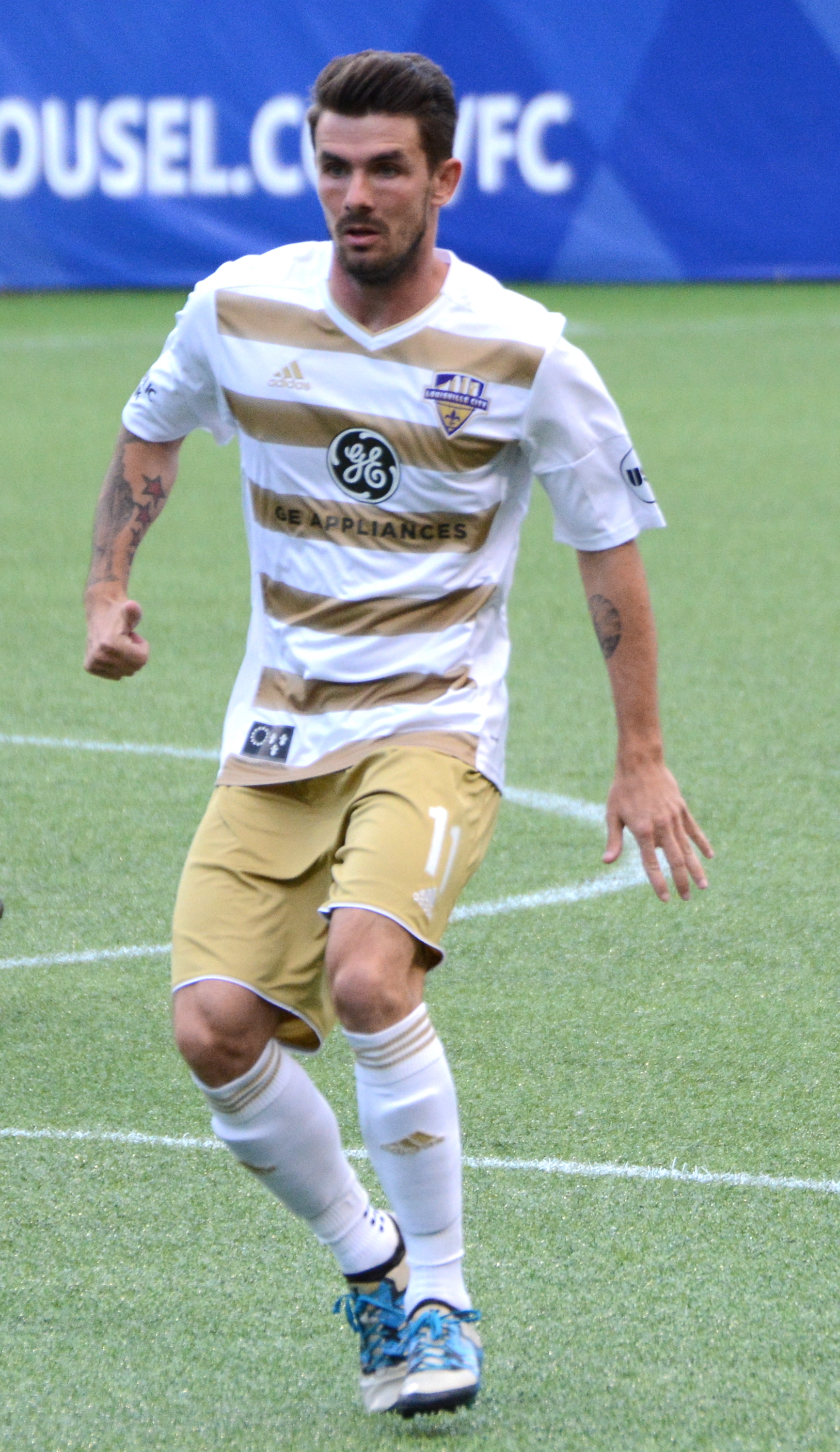
- McCabe playing for Louisville City in 2017

Personal information
- Date of birth: 6 October 1990 (age 36)
- Place of birth: Dublin, Ireland
- Height: 5 ft 8 in (1.73 m)
- Position: Attacking midfielder

Youth career
- –2010: Colaiste Ide
- 2010–2014: Young Harris College

Senior career*
Years	Team	Apps	(Gls)
2012–2013	Knoxville Force		
2014	Chattanooga FC	14	(5)
2015–2025	Louisville City	249	(22)
- * Club domestic league appearances and goals

Niall McCabe (born 6 October 1990) is an Irish former footballer who played as a midfielder for Louisville City FC through the 2025 season.

== Early life ==
=== Personal ===
McCabe was born in Ringsend, Dublin. He grew up playing with his local side, Cambridge Boys and Ashbourne United in Meath, among others, before deciding to travel to the United States to pursue a scholarship offer and a chance to earn a degree at Young Harris College.

=== College and youth ===
McCabe played four years of college soccer at the NCAA Division II Young Harris College between 2010 and 2014, after playing soccer in his high school years with Colaiste Ide in his hometown of Dublin, Ireland.

In 2012, McCabe led the Peach Belt Conference in goals and was second in assists; winning the conference's Golden Ball and being named to the All-Conference 1st team. In 2013 he was named to the All-Conference 2nd team. McCabe totaled 32 goals and 31 assists in 62 games at Young Harris to place second all time in goals and first all time in assists at the school. While at Young Harris, McCabe played in 2012 and 2013 for Knoxville Force of the NPSL, but in 2014 moved to Chattanooga FC in the same conference. For Chattanooga, McCabe totaled 5 goals in the 2014 NPSL season, which took Chattanooga FC to the NPSL finals.

== Club career ==
=== Louisville City FC ===
==== 2015 season ====
McCabe joined USL club Louisville City FC on 12 February 2015 and made his debut in Louisville City FC's first game. He appeared in 27 of the club's 28 regular season matches; starting 17. He scored four goals on 16 shots on goal.

==== 2016 season ====
McCabe scored two goals and registered four assists while appearing in only 21 matches. He had season ending surgery to repair a hip labral tear on his left side which his originally injured during the 2015 season. His last game was on 10 August against the Harrisburg City Islanders; missing all of the USL Cup Playoffs.

==== 2017 season ====
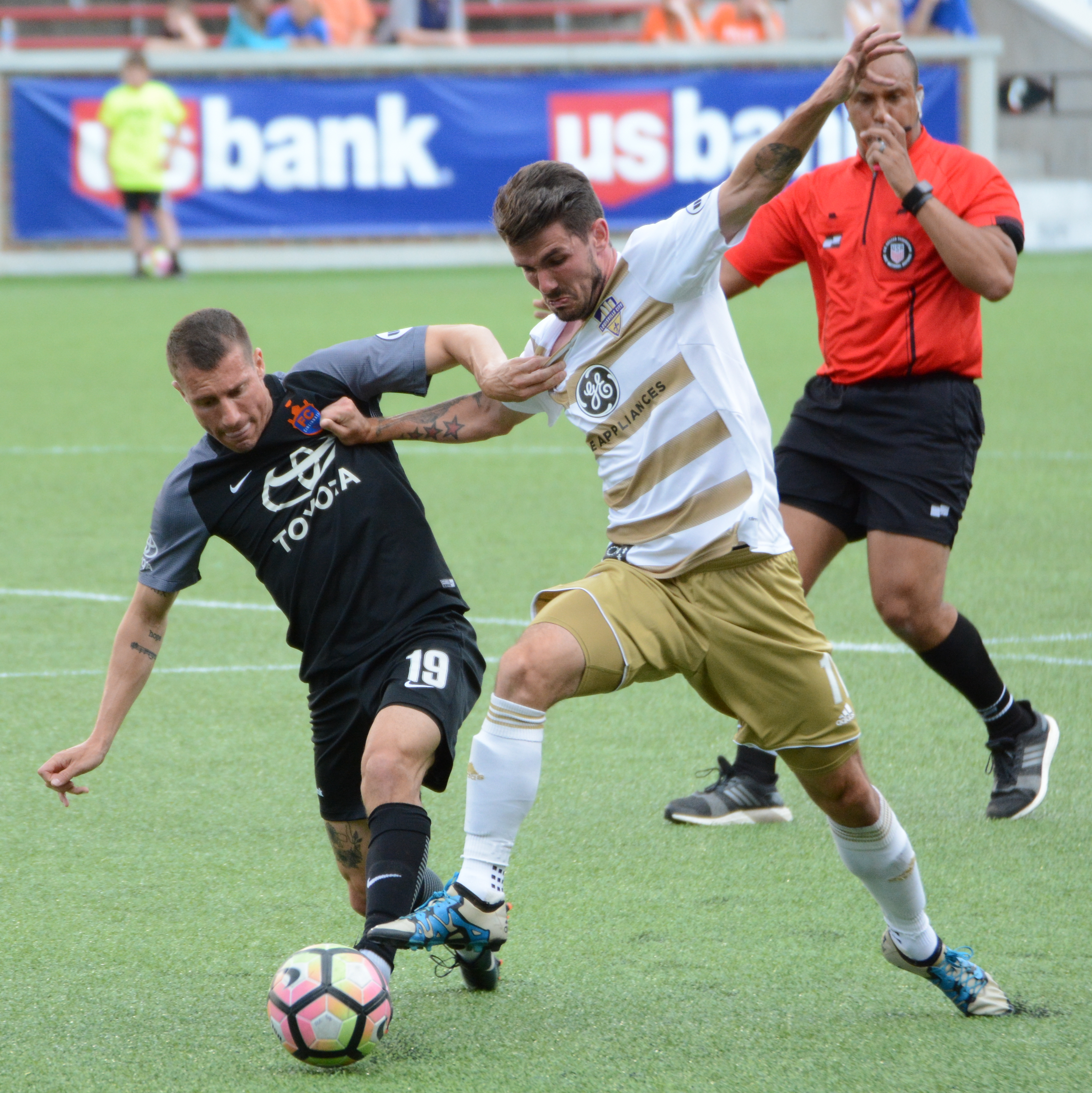
McCabe competes for the ball with Corben Bone of FC Cincinnati in the 2017 U.S. Open Cup.

After staying in Louisville to rehab over the winter McCabe was able to train with the team during the preseason and appear in the team's opening match (a scoreless draw against rival Saint Louis FC). He would go appear to appear in 23 matches and score three goals with four assists in league play. On 22 April McCabe was bitten by Djiby Fall while playing rival FC Cincinnati. Fall would be sent off and suspended for six games while McCabe received a tetanus shot. Louisville City would go on to win the USL's Eastern Conference and the USL Cup. McCabe would be named to the match squad for all four playoff matches but would only appear in the Conference semifinal against Rochester.

==== 2018 season ====
McCabe had his contract renewed with Louisville and he made his season debut on 17 March against USL expansion side Nashville SC where earned both a goal and an assist. He went on to appear in 22 of Louisville's 34 matches while scoring four goals with four assists. He also appeared in two of Louisville's five U.S. Open Cup matches as Louisville reached the quarter-finals of the competition for the first time in its history. This included a 3–2 victory over the New England Revolution of MLS; Louisville's first victory over an MLS side. McCabe also appeared in all four of Louisville's USL Cup matches and scored two goals in Louisville's first round match against the Indy Eleven; his first brace as a professional. He and Louisville went on to win the USL Cup Final against Phoenix Rising. On 9 October McCabe became the first Louisville player to reach 100 combined appearances in both the USL and USL Cup playoffs. He finished the year with 111 appearances across all competitions.

==== 2019 season ====
McCabe resigned with Louisville for the 2019 season as the final player from the original roster to remain with the club.

He retired following the 2025 season.

== Honours ==
Louisville City

- USL Cup: 2017, 2018
