= Plunket College of Further Education =

Plunket College
- Type: College of Further Education
- Affiliations: City of Dublin Education and Training Board; QQI
- Principal: Adrian Delaney
- Location: Whitehall, Dublin, Ireland
- Website: www.plunketcollege.ie

Plunket College of Further Education is a school in Whitehall, Dublin, established in 1967. Originally it was a vocational secondary school for boys, with preparation for the Group, Intermediate and Leaving Certificate, it has developed into a co-educational school focusing on the senior cycle and developing more post-leaving certificate courses in recent years. It is run by the City of Dublin Education and Training Board which replaced the Vocational Education Committee.

As well as Leaving Certificate two and one-year programmes, the college runs post leaving certificate programmes, pre-apprenticeship, Vocational Training Opportunities Scheme (VTOS) and Back to Education Initiative (BTEI) courses.

Its Post-leaving certificate programmes include Accounting Technician (ATI), Psychology, Business & IT, English Language (IELTS), Social Care, Carpentry, QQI Level5 Pre-University (Arts) in association with Trinity Colleges Access Programme (TAP).

== Clonturk Community College ==
In 2016, City of Dublin ETB and Educate Together established Clonturk Community College is based on the City of Dublin ETB Whitehall grounds, adjacent to Plunket College of Further Education. It was announced in 2023 as part of a Memorandum of Understanding between the Department of Education, and City of Dublin ETB, that the permanent school for Clonturk CC would be built on the grounds adjacent to Plunket College.
