= Ringsend Technical Institute =

Secondary school in Dublin, Ireland

Location
- Cambride Road, Dublin 4 Dublin, D04 N227; Ireland; 53.34378°N 6.22404°W

Information
- Former name: Ringsend Technical Institute
- Type: Secondary school & Further Education
- Denomination: Multi-denominational
- Established: 7 October 1893 (originally); 15 April 1983 (current form)
- Educational authority: City of Dublin ETB (DETB)
- School number: 70200D
- Principal: Jonathan Walker
- Gender: Mixed

Ringsend College is a multi-denominational secondary school and further education college run by the City of Dublin Education and Training Board (CDETB). The college operates under a local sub-committee which is representative of parents, staff, community, local primary schools and industry. It is chaired by Kevin Humphreys.

The original college was opened by the Earl of Pembroke on 7 October 1893 as a technical and fisheries college for the community of Ringsend. The Ringsend Technical Institute (the current form of the college) was opened by Taoiseach Garret FitzGerald on 15 April 1983, and was renamed to Ringsend College in 2011.

The college offers the Junior Cert, Leaving Cert, Repeat Leaving Cert, Post leaving Cert, and FIT/VTOS Adult programmes.

== Location ==
The college is situated on Cambridge Road in Ringsend, Dublin 4. It overlooks the Liffey, near the East Link Toll Bridge.

== Courses ==
=== Junior Certificate ===
There is a 3-year programme for the Junior Certificate covering core subjects English, Irish, Maths, Religious Education, Science and Physical Education.

Other subjects vary from year to year depending on demand and can include French, Woodwork M.T.W., Art, Metalwork, Home Economics, Technical Graphics, Business Studies, Music.

=== Leaving Certificate ===
This is a 2-year programme covering 5th and 6th years. The core subjects are: English, Irish, Maths, Religious Education, French and the Leaving Cert Vocational Programme.

Optional subjects are Art, Engineering, Home Economics, Business Studies, Biology, History, Geography, Music.

At the senior cycle, preparation for work and specific job opportunities are dealt with by the school's guidance counsellor. Also, information and advice is given regarding CAO/CAS applications and all other further educational opportunities.

=== Other courses ===
In the 2022-23 academic year, the college offered a PLC (NFQ Level 5 and 6) courses, such as 'Computer Systems & Networks' (including CompTIA A+ certification) and 'Business Administration with IT Skills'. Part-time courses included a "Back to Education Initiative" (BTEI).

== Notable alumni ==
- Abbie Larkin
- Ray Lynam
