= Postgraduate diploma =

Type of postgraduate qualification

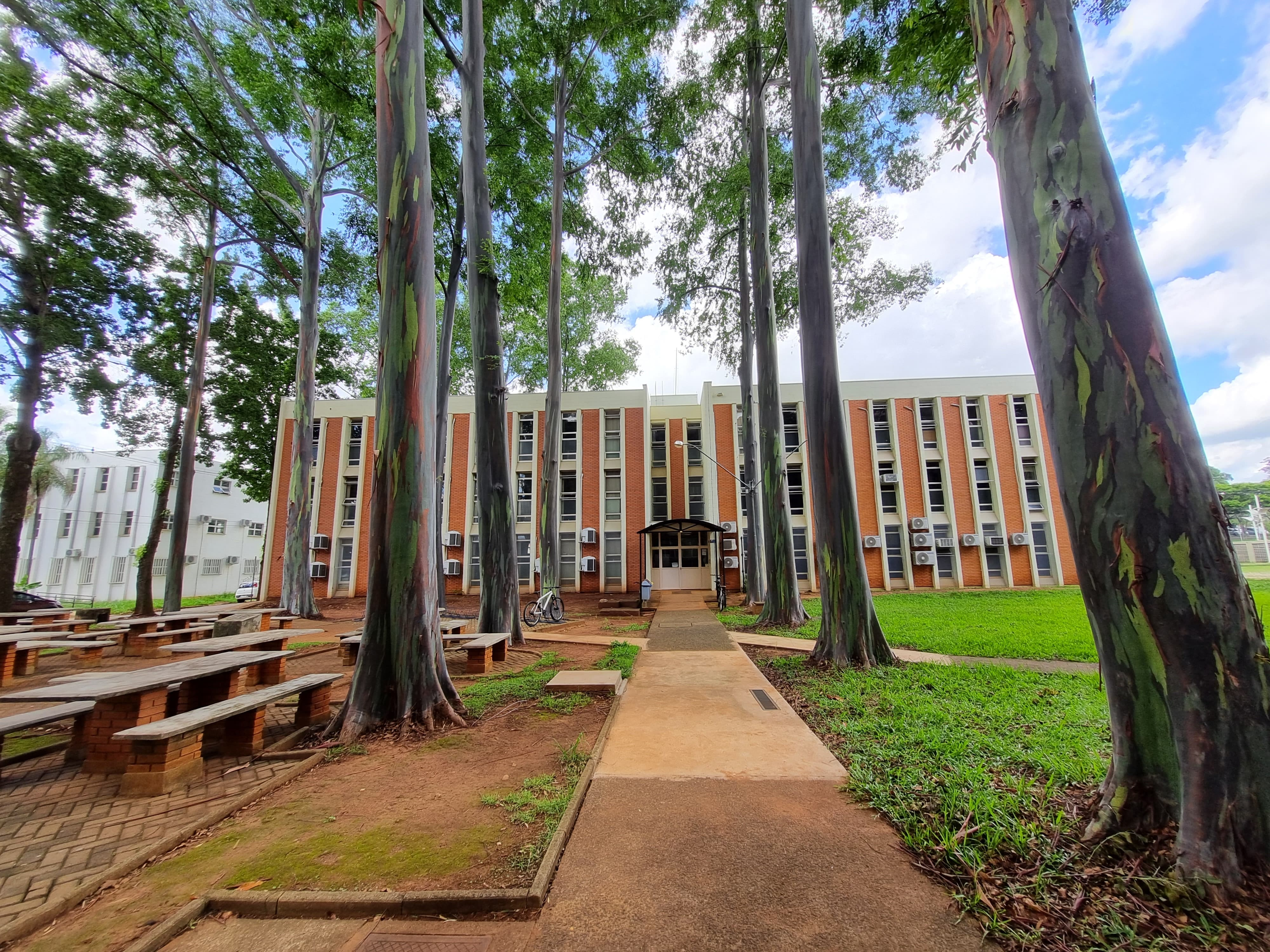
The State University of Campinas, as well as many Brazilian universities, offer Postgraduate courses in Brazil

A postgraduate diploma (PgD, PgDip, PGDip, PG Dip., PGD, Dipl. PGD) is a postgraduate qualification at the level of a master's degree, awarded after a university degree, which supplements the original degree and awards them with a graduate diploma. The minimum requirement of completing a bachelor's degree is necessary to start the postgraduate course. The duration of a postgraduate course can vary from 1 year to 2 years.

Countries that award postgraduate diplomas include but are not limited to Australia, Bangladesh, Barbados, Belgium, Brazil, Canada, Chile, Colombia, Germany, Hong Kong, India, Ireland, Israel, Jamaica, Kenya, the Netherlands, New Zealand, Nigeria, Pakistan, Panama, the Philippines, Poland, Portugal, Russia, Saudi Arabia, Singapore, South Africa, Spain, Sri Lanka, Sudan, Sweden, Trinidad and Tobago, the United Kingdom and Zimbabwe. Level of education and recognition differ per issuing country.

== Australia and New Zealand ==
The Australian equivalent of a postgraduate diploma is called a Graduate Diploma (GDip or GradDip), situated at AQF (Australian Qualifications Framework) level eight. New Zealand universities offer postgraduate diplomas (PostGradDip). NZQA level of post graduate diploma is also eight. A postgraduate diploma (or Australian graduate diploma) indicates master's-level studies; a Graduate Diploma is generally equivalent to the first year of a two-year master's degree. Admission is typically based on past study such as via a university degree, although other factors can be taken into account.

== Bangladesh ==
In Bangladesh, both public and private sector institutions offer Postgraduate Diploma (PGD) programmes across various fields. In the public sector, Bangladesh Institute of Management (BIM) provides a range of Postgraduate Diploma courses, notably in Management, aimed at developing managerial skills for mid-career professionals. In the private sector, institutions like Bangladesh Institute of Management Studies (BiMS) offer Postgraduate Diplomas, with programmes designed to enhance practical and theoretical knowledge for professionals across disciplines.

== Canada ==
In Canada, a postgraduate certificate program consists of two to three semesters, which can be completed in less than one year in some instances. A university's degree or a master's degree is required to be accepted in this type of program. It offers the advantage of not requiring to write a thesis and to focus on a concise subject. It is recommended for students wishing to enhance their professional skills as it concentrates on a more practical application in order to enter the labor market. Depending on the province, the title can vary: Post-Graduate Diploma, Graduate Diploma, Post-Graduate Certification, Post-Baccalaureate or D.E.S.S. (Quebec's Diplômes d'études supérieures spécialisées). See links to the Canadian education system, as the various regions can be quite different.

== Colombia ==
In Colombia, postgraduate diplomas (Especializaciones) are offered by universities and higher education institutions as specialized short programs designed to enhance professional knowledge and skills. These programs typically require a completed bachelor's degree (Licenciatura or Pregrado) for admission and serve as an alternative to a full master's degree (Maestría).

Postgraduate diplomas in Colombia are widely used in fields such as business administration, education, healthcare, law, and engineering. They usually last between 6 months and 1 year and focus on applied learning rather than research. Many Colombian universities, including the Universidad de los Andes, Universidad Nacional de Colombia, and Pontificia Universidad Javeriana, offer these programs to professionals looking to improve their career prospects or specialize in emerging disciplines.

The programs do not confer a master's degree but may allow students to later transition into a master's program with advanced standing. Unlike a master's degree, postgraduate diplomas in Colombia do not require a thesis or dissertation.

== India ==
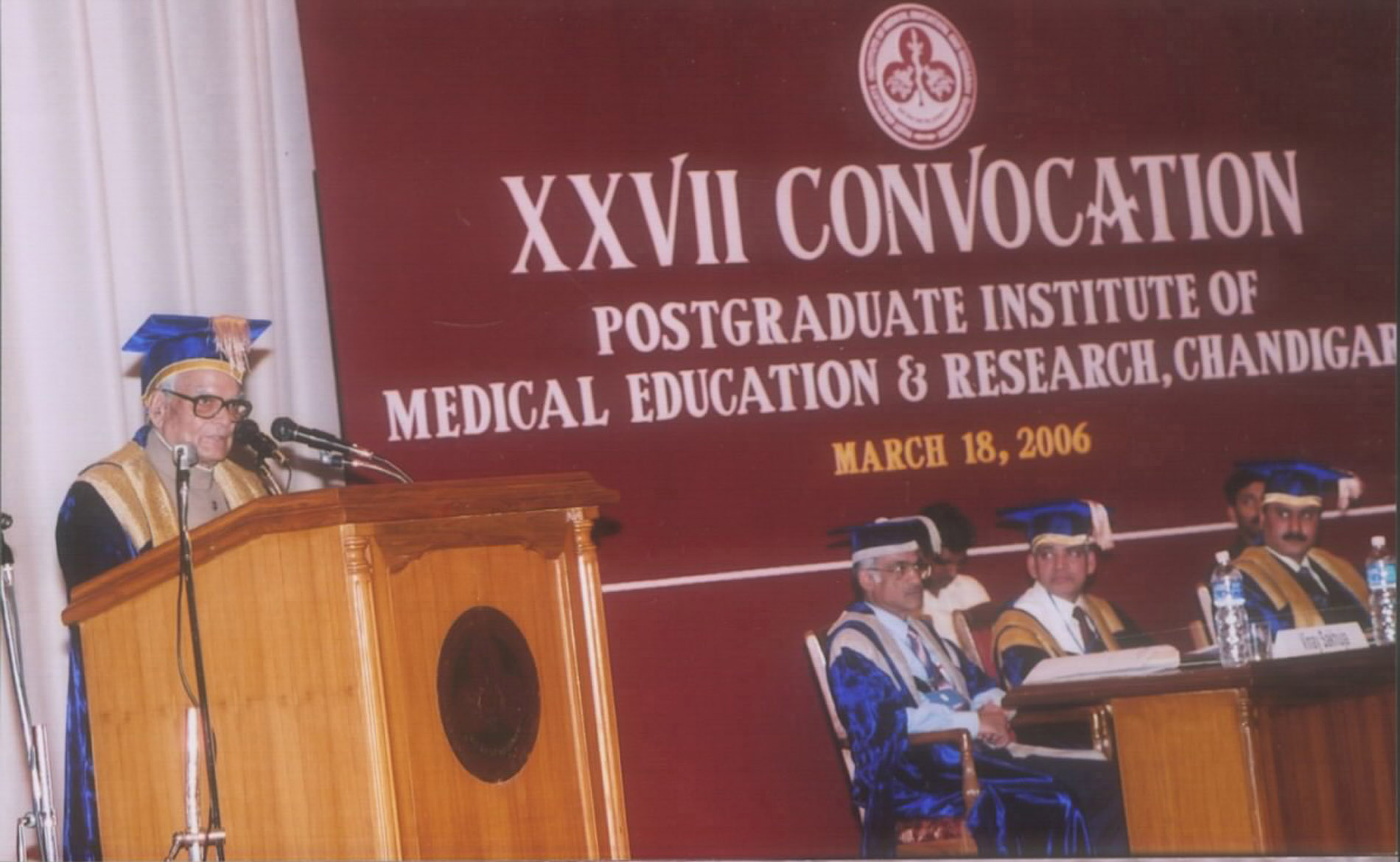
Completion of the Postgraduate course in Medical Education and Research in India

In India, there are a number of institutes and universities offering postgraduate diploma programs (PG Diploma). These post-graduate diploma programs are mainly one-year programs that are divided into two to four semesters, depending on hands-on training, field work, and credit requirements. These are master's level programs that only cover the essentials. These programs are mainly targeted to offer professional education and training to the candidates for the better employment opportunity and industry readiness. It is designed to provide in-depth exposure to concepts, scientific principles, implementation methodology of new approaches. Post-graduate diplomas in Management, Post-graduate diploma in Banking & Finance, Financial Economics, Business Analytics, Remote Sensing & GIS, Robotics, Industrial Maintenance Engineering and Advanced Manufacturing Technology, are examples of courses offered in India. Certain institutes provide postgraduate diploma programs which satisfies the credit requirement for a master's program with increased number of lower credit courses for 2 years, these programs are provisionally considered equivalent to a master's level. Postgraduate diploma programs are meant for those with a bachelor's degree to gain an advanced technical grasp and to those with a master's degree to enhance their interdisciplinary/translation grasp.

== Ireland ==
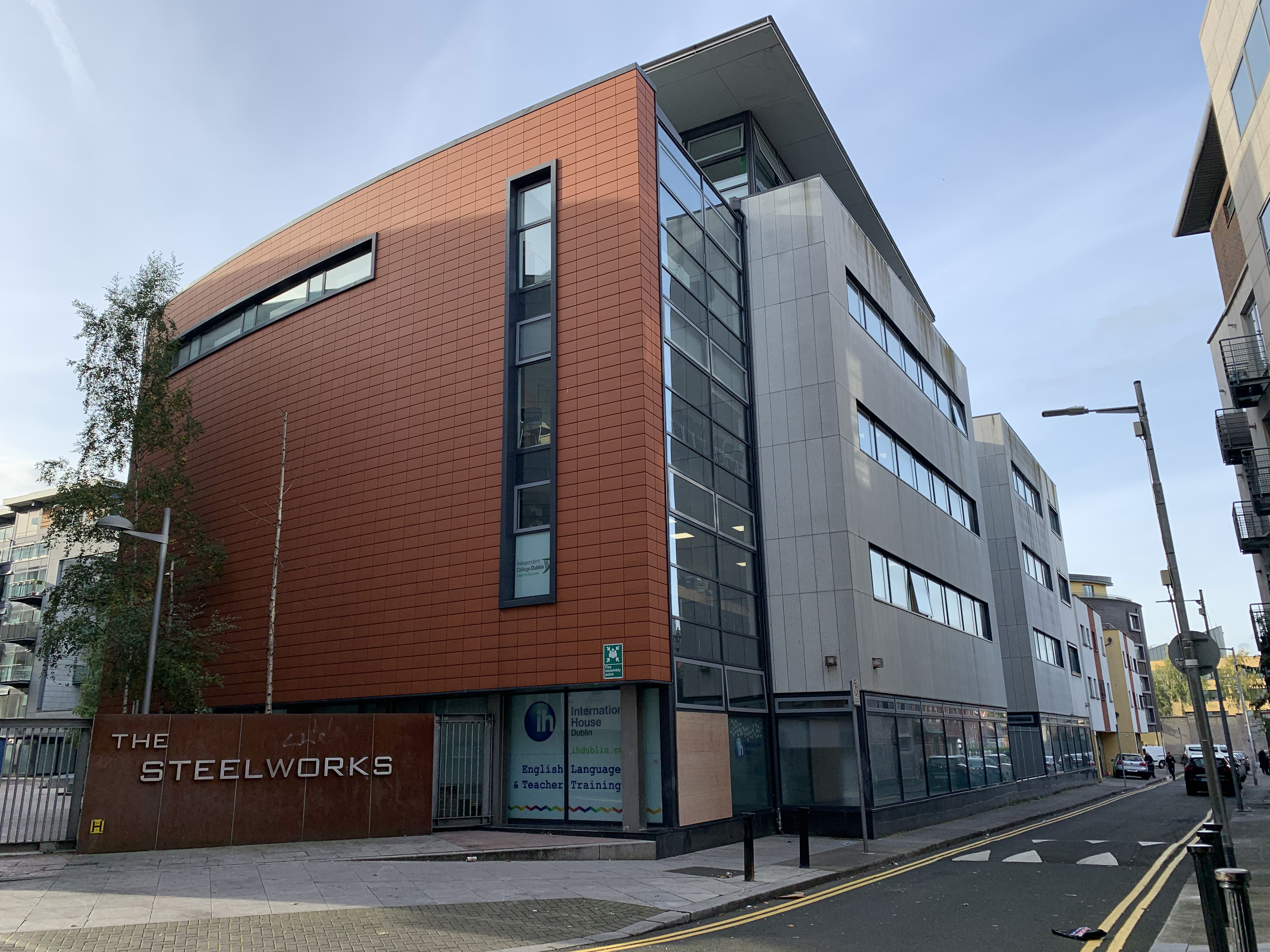
Independent College Dublin is a college which offers courses at Certificate, Diploma, Degree, and Postgraduate levels, along with Professional Development courses, in Dublin

Commonly referred to as PgD, the postgraduate diploma (Gaeilge: Dioplóma Iarchéime) has been awarded by the Higher Education and Training Awards Council (also known as QQI, Quality Qualifications Ireland, Gaeilge: Dearbhú Cáilíochta agus Cáilíochtaí Éireann), since June 2005 in institutions associated with and accredited by the council. This postgraduate qualification is awarded for a wide range of programmes in the sciences, engineering, and humanities, among others. Entry requirement is a Level 8 Honours Degree in line with EQF standards, including Bachelor's degree or vocational degrees, such as the Meister or Staatlich Geprüfter Betriebswirt in Germany. Most institutions operate under the Recognition of Prior Experiential Learning (RPEL) scheme meaning applicants who do not meet the normal academic requirements may be considered based on publications, relevant work or research experience, which will usually involve an assessment centre or interview process. In Ireland, the vast majority of postgraduate diplomas require the same duration and level of studies as a Master's degree, namely EQF Level 9, yet additional coursework or an independent research project replace the thesis. While progression to doctoral study is only possible at selected universities in Ireland, the Irish postgraduate diploma is widely accepted for entry to EQF Level 8 doctoral degree's in most countries.

== Portugal ==
In Portugal a postgraduate diploma (in Portuguese Pós-graduação) can be awarded under two circumstances: 1) as part of an independent program of studies; 2) after the completion of the first year of study in a masters program.

== Singapore ==
The postgraduate diploma is a postgraduate academic qualification taken after a bachelor's degree. It is usually awarded by a university or a graduate school. It usually takes two or more study terms to complete, a wide variety of courses are offered. It is also possible for graduate diploma holders to progress to a master's degree. Only postgraduate diplomas that are registered with the Ministry of Education (Singapore) are recognised by the industry.

== Spain ==
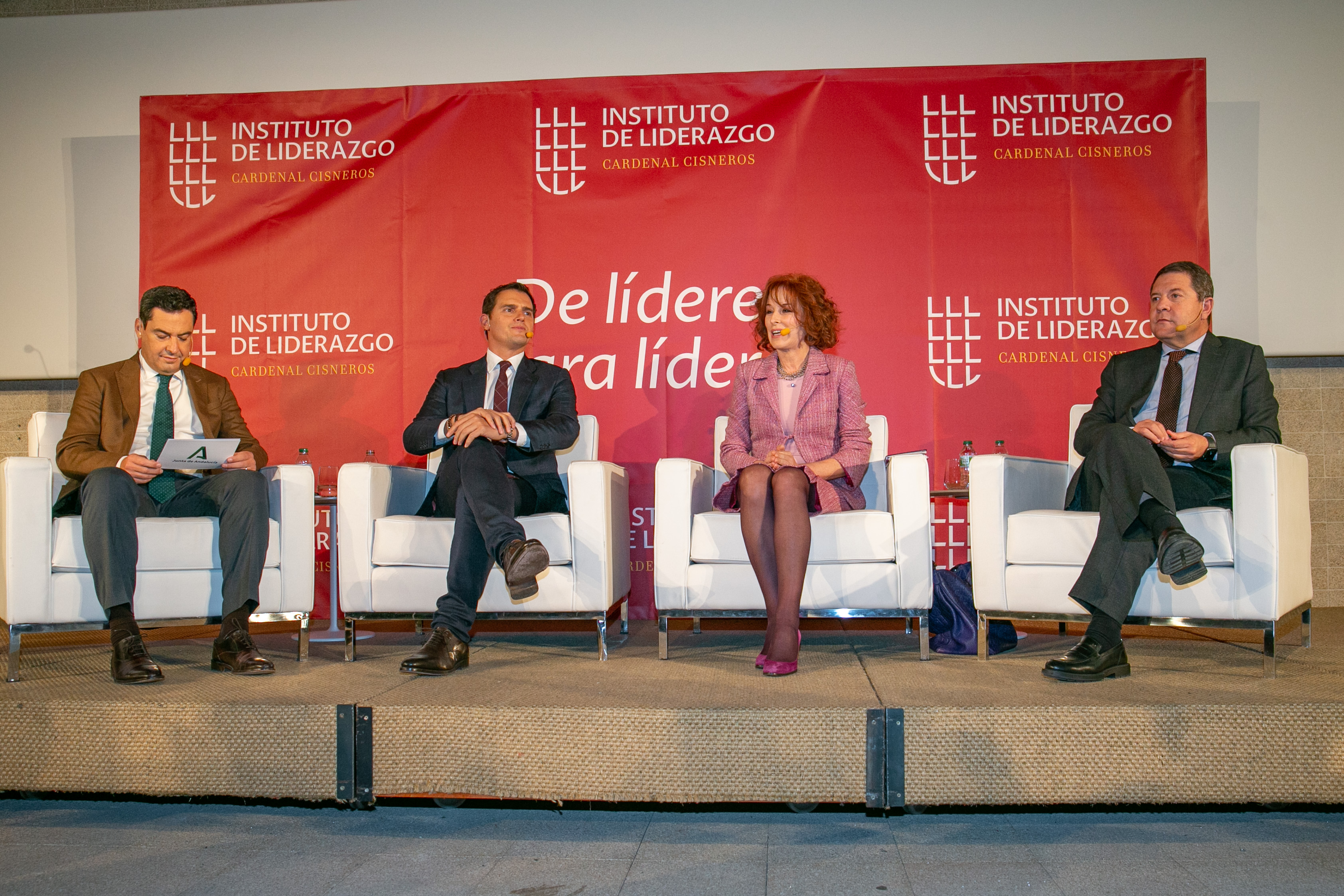
Postgraduate in Leadership in Madrid

The postgraduate diploma (PgDip) is awarded by a variety of Spain universities and follows the European Credit Transfer and Accumulation System (ECTS) grading system.

For example, Pablo de Olavide University offers an English-language PgDip in the Integral Protection of Human Rights Defenders and Social Activists in cooperation with Protection International. The University of the Basque Country (UPV/EHU) offers an English-language PgDip in International Election Observation and Electoral Assistance, run in cooperation with many organisations in the field of election monitoring, such as The Carter Center, Electoral Reform International Services (ERIS), International Foundation for Electoral Systems (IFES), National Democratic Institute (NDI), the Organization of American States (OAS) and the OSCE Office for Democratic Institutions and Human Rights (ODIHR).

== Sri Lanka ==
In Sri Lanka, a postgraduate diploma is a postgraduate academic qualification taken after a bachelor's degree.

== United Kingdom ==
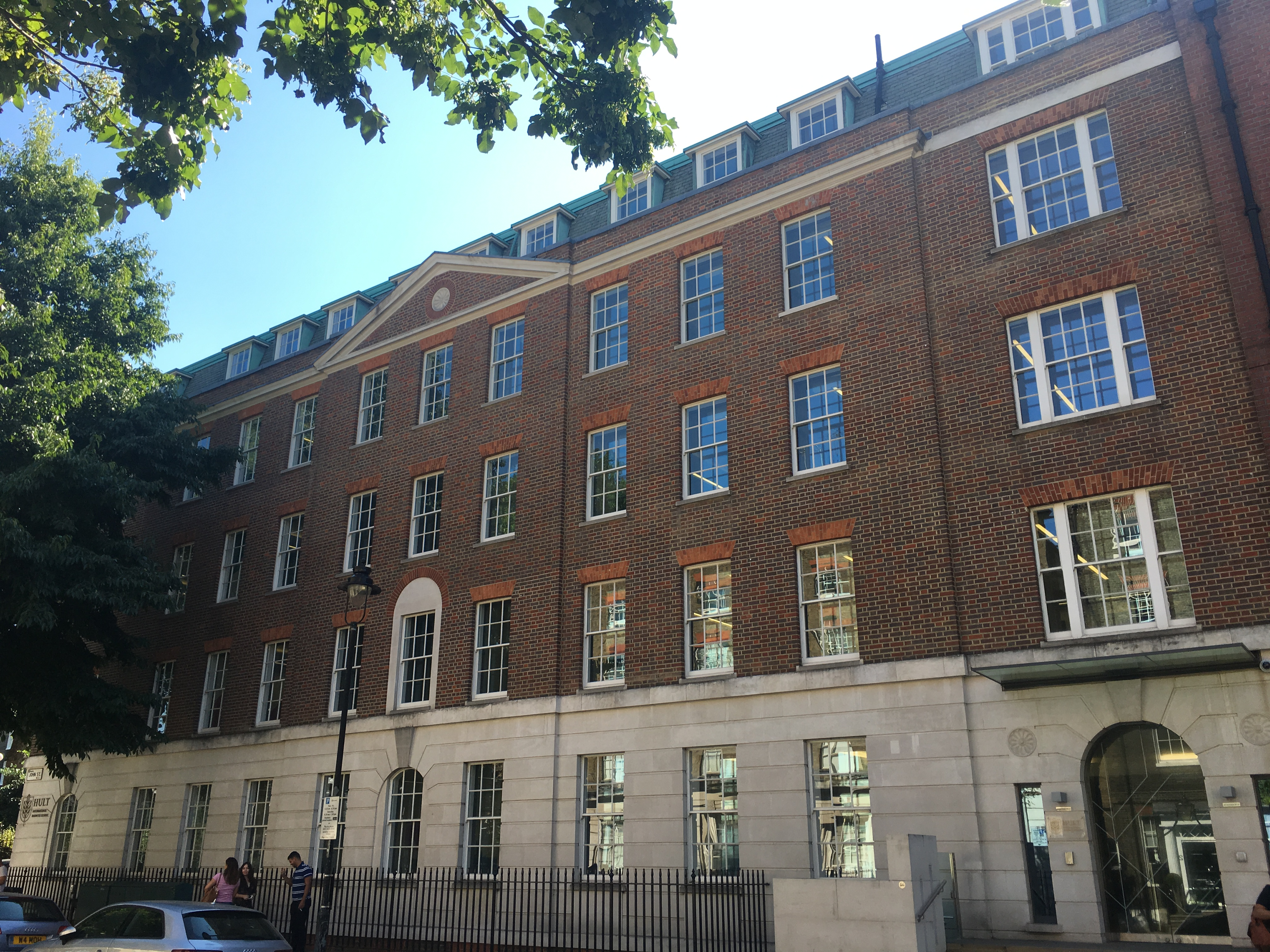
Hult Postgraduate Campus in London

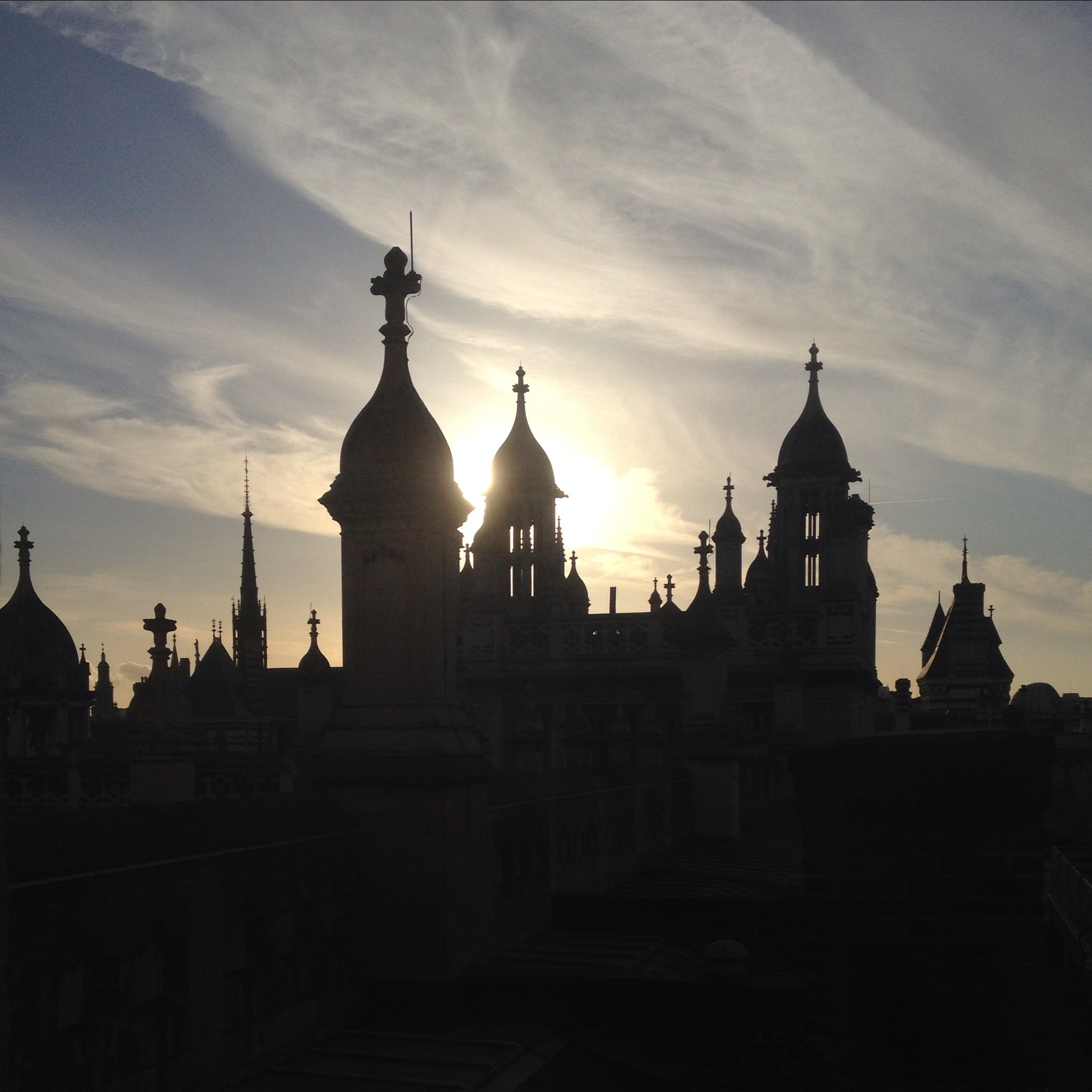
King's College London and its Postgraduate building

There are a vast number of postgraduate diplomas available in the United Kingdom. This could be a vocational course studied after an academic degree, such as the Legal Practice Course or the Bar Vocational Course; the resulting diplomas allow the student to enter legal training, relevant to either the solicitor or barrister professions, respectively. Postgraduate diplomas allow a graduate student to study a more advanced programme than at the bachelor's level. It is contrasted with a graduate diploma, where a student studies a new academic subject at degree level, but in a short space of time, such as the Graduate Diploma in Law (also known as the Common Professional Exam), which allows a postgraduate student to study the seven foundation subjects of a three-year undergraduate law degree, in a period of nine months. The City and Guilds of London Institute awards a post graduate diploma 9210 in engineering subjects that are endorsed by the professional engineering institutions, and count toward qualifying as a Chartered Engineer.

In the U.K. a postgraduate diploma is a postgraduate qualification at the level of a master's degree (level 7 of the Framework for Higher Education Qualifications in England, Wales and Northern Ireland, level 11 of the Framework for Qualification of Higher Education Institutes in Scotland). They are considered by the National Qualification Framework (NQF) to be at a comparable level to a master's degree, however, they require fewer study credits to achieve (120 credits) when compared to a full master's degree (180 credits). They are typically classified into Distinction, Merit, and Pass, similar to most master's courses. Many schools of architecture commonly operate a 1 or 2-year postgraduate diploma course providing ARB part 3 education in this fashion.

A postgraduate diploma is commonly awarded to students who have completed the master's programme and continuing a one-year advanced course similar to the first year of a PhD program.

A postgraduate diploma typically represents 120 credits of postgraduate courses (whereas a full master's degree is usually 180 credits). Postgraduate diplomas are usually abbreviated as PGDip, PG Dip, PgD, PgDip, and, similar to a PgCert, diploma holders are permitted to use 'PgDip' or 'PgD' as a post-nominal, which is usually listed after all other academic degrees in ascending order, but before any professional qualifications.

== Nigeria ==
In Nigeria PGD is used as a required supplement for students seeking to apply for another postgraduate program (e.g. PhD, master's degree etc.) who have a Higher National Diploma (HND), other lower degrees, a degree in a course that is not connected to that which one seeks a postgraduate admission for, or graduated with very low score from a university.
