= North Strand FET Campus =

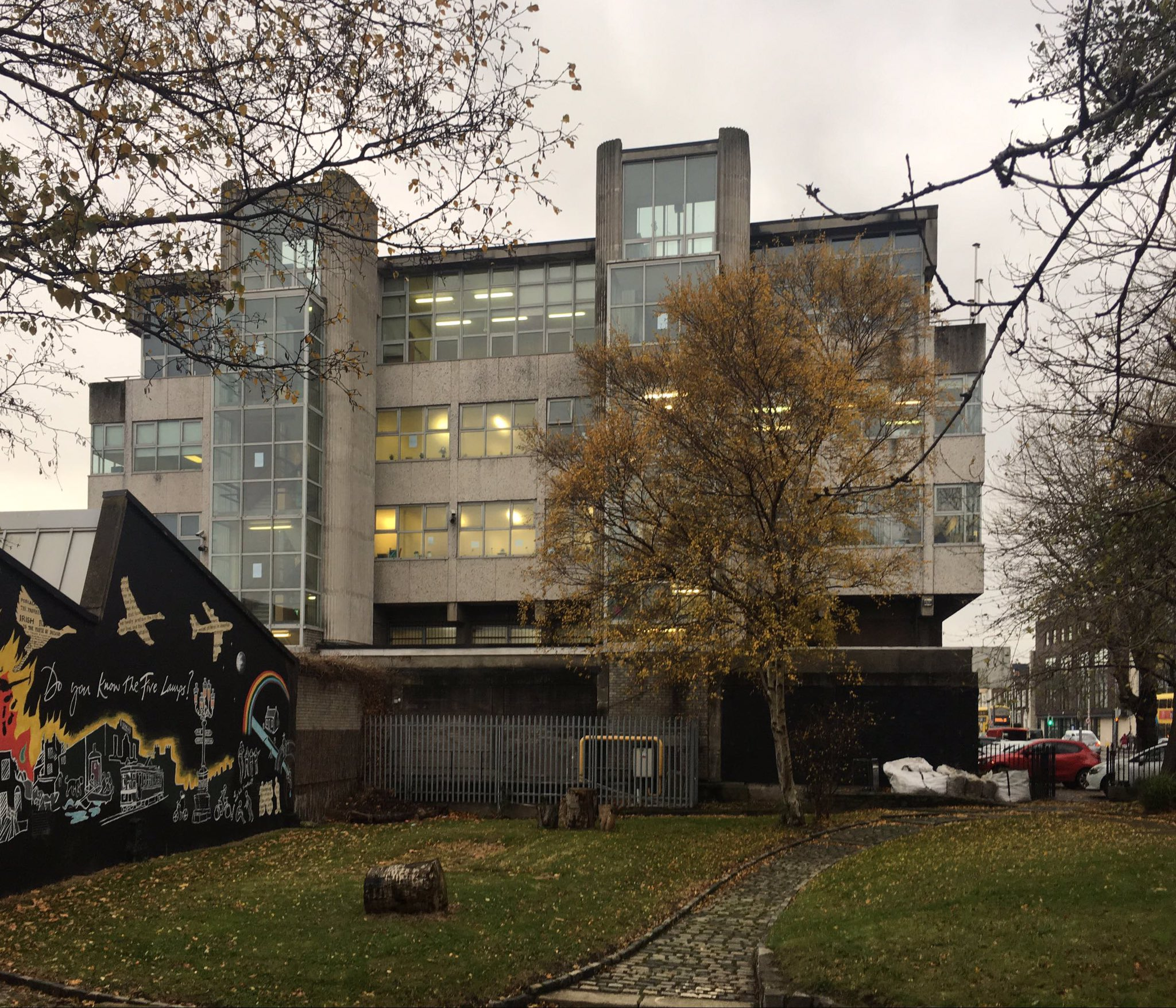
North Strand FET Campus (formerly Marino and Killester Colleges of Further Education) North Strand FET Campus
- Motto: Create your Future
- Type: College of Further Education(ETB)
- Affiliations: City of Dublin Education and Training Board; QQI
- Principal: Patricia O'Keeffe
- Location: North Strand, Dublin, Ireland; 53.35514°N 6.24579°W
- Website: www.cathalbrughafet.ie

Cathal Brugha FET North Strand Campus is a division of a college of further education in Dublin's north inner city. It was formed from the former Marino College of Further Education with Killester College of Further Education merging in. It is now part of the City of Dublin FET College.

== History ==
The campus occupies what was formerly known as Connolly House on the North Strand, Dublin. The building was designed and built by Gleeson Byrne Whelan in 1971, and is of brutalist design.

The campus was rebranded North Strand FET Campus, a constituent campus of Cathal Brugha FET College, in March 2023. It was formerly the site of North Strand Technical College, before that school moved to Larkin Community College, on Champions Avenue. Marino College then took residence in the building from the year 2000.

The campus and college are governed by the City of Dublin Education Training Board (ETB) (formerly City of Dublin Vocational Education Committee (VEC). Prior to being Cathal Brugha FET College North Strand Campus, Marino College — and by extension Marino College of Further Education was one of the first educational establishments in Ireland to offer Post Leaving Certificate (PLC) vocational programmes.

== Departments and Courses ==
The college has a strong history of delivering vocational education and training. Its innovative pre-nursing course dates from the early 1980's. The college was one of four chosen to deliver the pilot programme Certificate in Early Learning and Care in 2021. It runs a number of skills to advance courses in areas such as Digital Marketing and International Management and Leadership.

=== Certification ===
The courses are certified by a number of bodies including Quality and Qualification Ireland (QQI) (previously known as FETAC and NCVA), City and Guilds, ITEC as well as other professional training awards.

The college operates a number of Faculties, not limited to Health, Dental, Nursing, Back to Education Initiative (BTEI), Childcare, Business, Office Administration, Beauty, Animal Science, Computer Networks, and Fashion Styling and Creative Studies. The college runs a number of Apprenticeships, Traineeships, and Skills to advance courses.

=== Departments at North Strand Campus ===
- Animal Science Department
- Beauty Department
- Childcare Department
- Computing Department
- Creative Department
- Health Science Department
- Returning to Education Department

== Consolidation with Killester College of Further Education ==
In March 2022, it was confirmed that Marino CFE and Killester CFE would consolidate services, and take lease of the former TU Dublin site on Cathal Brugha St/Marlborough St, announced by Minister of Education Norma Foley, and Minister of Higher and Further Education Simon Harris, as part of the Strategic plan for a strategic response to education provision in North Dublin city by optimising the use of existing properties. Part of this was the announcement that Killester College Campus would become the permanent site of Killester Raheny Clontarf Educate Together National School.

After this announcement the "One College, Three Campuses" was promoted on social media and distributed to students. Business, Tourism, and Culture and Heritage would relocate to Marlborough Street, Science, Animal Science, Networks would remain in Killester, and some courses would move to North Strand Campus, namely Pre Emergency Services, Classroom Assistant among others.

The North Strand Campus was rebranded in March 2023 from Marino College of Further Education, and with the conversion of the Killester Campus to the ETNS, all courses from the former Killester Campus will be located between North Strand and Marlborough Street.

== Events ==
In May 2019, Sabina Higgins (wife of President Higgins) attended the College's annual graduation ceremony in Croke Park.

=== Zombie Run ===
The college runs the successful City of Dublin ETB Sports and Cultural Council annual Zombie Run, prior to Halloween every year. It is a highlight of the college calendar.

=== Creative Exhibition ===
The college holds an annual exhibition/Celebration of creative department student work.

=== Five Lamps Arts Festival ===
The College has a long association with the Five Lamp's Arts Festival, which was founded by former teacher Roisin Lonergan.
