= Shane Dunphy =

British author and journalist (born 1973)

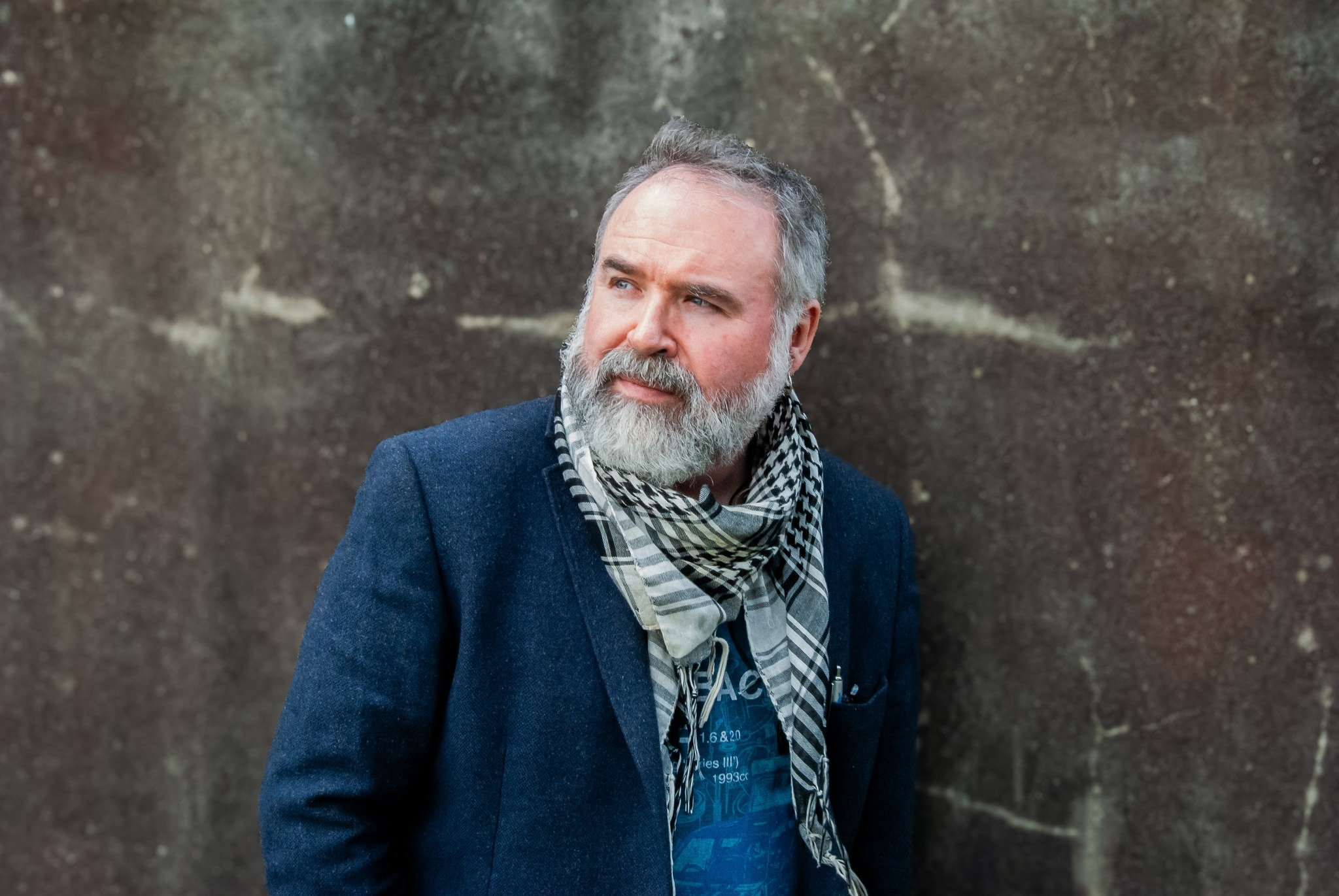
- Born: 18 January 1973 (age 53); Brighton, England
- Citizenship: Irish
- Occupations: Author, journalist
- Website: shanedunphyauthor.org

Shane Dunphy (born 18 January 1973) is a British author, journalist, and child protection advocate. He is known for a series of books detailing cases he worked on as a social care worker and journalist.

== Early life ==
Dunphy was born on 18 January 1973 in Brighton, England.

== Career ==
=== Child protection ===
Dunphy began his career as a volunteer in a daycare unit for adults with intellectual disabilities before completing secondary school. While studying at college, he worked in a residential care unit for teenagers and a psychiatric outpatient unit. After qualifying, Dunphy worked in residential care and various sectors, including early childhood education, community childcare, arts, and youth work.

=== Journalism ===
Dunphy's journalism covers many topics, though he is best known for analyzing child protection issues. He has contributed to several newspapers, including the Irish Independent, where he has written on government policies and the childcare industry. His investigative work has also appeared in the Sunday World under the banner "Stories From the Peripheries", covering issues like people trafficking, child prostitution, and elder abuse.

Dunphy has written about the Travelling community in Ireland, which has led to public discussions and controversies, particularly after his 2009 article suggesting that the community should address its internal issues. Despite receiving criticism, Dunphy has maintained his stance on these issues.

=== Literary work ===
Dunphy is the author of several memoirs and crime novels. His first book, Wednesday's Child, a memoir of his time as a child protection worker, became a number-one Irish bestseller and was adapted into a short film. The adaptation won the Tiernan McBride Award at the Galway Film Fleadh in 2022 and was long-listed for the Oscars. Dunphy's other works include crime novels.

== Personal life and advocacy ==
In 2020, Dunphy publicly disclosed his experiences as a survivor of clerical sexual abuse during an interview on The Ryan Tubridy Show. He shared his journey of coming to terms with the trauma through therapy, emphasizing the importance of addressing such experiences.

In 2015, Dunphy was invited to join the Irish political party Renua Ireland. He ultimately left the party due to ideological differences.

As of 2017, Dunphy is the head of the social care department at Waterford College of Further Education.

== Books ==
- The Wednesday's Child Series (non-fiction) Wednesday's Child (2006)
- Crying in the Dark (also published as Last Ditch House) (2007)
- Hush Little Baby (2008)
- The Boy in the Cupboard (2008)
- Will Mummy Be Coming Back for Me (2009)
- Little Boy Lost (2010)
- The Girl Who Couldn't Smile (2012)
- The Girl From Yesterday (2014)
- The Boy They Tried to Hide (2016)
- Stories From the Margins (non-fiction) Bleak Alley (2019)
- The Bad Place (September 2020)
- Ceremony For the Dead (14 January 2021)
- Running From the Shadows (Stephanie Hickey with Shane Dunphy) (2019)
- My Name Is Jhon (John Brennan with Shane Dunphy) (2021)
- The Dunnigan Series (Crime Fiction) After She Vanished (2017)
- When She Was Gone (2018)
- If She Returned (2019)
- Why She Ran (2020)
- The Boyle and Keneally Series (Crime Fiction) Bring Her Home (2021)
- Lost Graves (2022)
- Her Child's Cry (2022)
- Stand Alone Novels (Crime Fiction) The Helpdesk (2023)
- The Tessa Burns Series (Crime Fiction) Little Witness (2024)
- Only the Children (2024)
- Her Lonely Soul (2024)
