= Galway Technical Institute =

- Institiúid Theicniúil na Gaillimhe
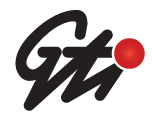
- Galway Technical Institute logo
- Type: Public
- Established: January 1894
- Accreditation: QQI
- Students: 1,300+
- Location: Galway, Connacht, Ireland; 53.267351°N 9.059518°W
- Campus: Urban
- Website: www.gti.ie

The Galway Technical Institute is a college of further education providing QQI Level 5 & 6 programmes. The college is located in on Father Griffin Road, Claddagh, Galway, Ireland.

The college provides programmes which are recognised and accredited by QQI. Galway Technical Institute has programmes available across 10 departments consisting of Applied Health Sciences, Art & Design, Arts & Social Studies, Business & Law, Fashion, Hairdressing & Beauty, IT & Computing, Media, Sport, and Technology: Design & Engineering.

The college also provides non-accredited and accredited adult education part-time programmes.

== History ==
In January 1893 the board of guardians of Galway Poor Law Union decided to establish a technical school in Galway city. Eventually a site was purchased on Dominick Street and in January 1894 classes began. These classes catered for 35 all male students and initially the courses being provided were mathematics, theoretics and physiography, machine construction, building and woodwork.

By 1908, GTI was teaching Bookkeeping, Commercial correspondence, Theoretical mechanics, Physics, and Chemistry.

In the early 20th century it became clear that the Dominick Street building was not large enough to cater for the number of interested students. This led to the purchasing of a site on Father Griffin road, and construction work on the college's current building was completed there in 1938, with the official opening taking place in September of that year. Initially the school catered for second level students only, but towards the end of the 20th century it became a third level educational facility.

In 2022, GTI's parent organisation GRETB was awarded €77 million by the Irish government to be used in the construction of a new facility, planned to be located adjacent to the existing Galway Community College in Wellpark.
