= Coláiste Stiofáin Naofa =

Further education college in Cork, Ireland

Cork College of Further Education - Tramore Road Campus (formerly CSN College and Coláiste Stiofáin Naofa)
- Students: 738 (2019)
- Location: Cork city, Ireland; 51.877°N 8.481°W
- Website: http://www.tramoreroadcampus.ie

Coláiste Stiofáin Naofa is an educational institution in Cork city in Ireland. Like other further education colleges in Ireland, the college offers further education courses, including Post Leaving Certificate courses.

Coláiste Stiofáin Naofa has been involved in adult education, and further education since 1986. Courses offered include radio broadcasting, art, furniture design, construction technologies, humanities, business, information technology, performing arts, and music.

Between 2011 and 2019, the college was subject to separate investigations for "breaches of procurement rules", facilities concerns, and funding "irregularities".

== Former students ==
Past students have included:

- Damien Cahalane, hurler and Gaelic footballer
- Mick Flannery, singer and songwriter
- Sinéad Lohan, singer and songwriter
- Chiedozie Ogbene, footballer
- The Frank and Walters, alternative pop band
- Nora Twomey, animator, producer and voice actress
- Bambie Thug, musician, singer and songwriter
