= Accounting Technicians Ireland =

- Formerly: Institute of Accounting Technicians in Ireland
- Industry: Accountancy and finance
- Founded: [IRL] (1983)
- Headquarters: Dublin, Ireland
- Area served: Ireland
- Key people: President: Micheal Meegan, Vice President: Dargan FitzGerald
- Members: 10,000
- Website: www.accountingtechniciansireland.ie

Accounting Technicians Ireland is an organisation providing accounting education in Ireland. They have over 10,000 members and students in the Republic of Ireland and in Northern Ireland.

The organisation was established in 1983.

Accounting Technicians Ireland is a non-profit organisation. They are a partner body of Chartered Accountants Ireland and an associate member of the International Federation of Accountants (IFAC). They have offices in Dublin and Belfast and links with local college networks throughout Ireland.

Accounting Technicians Ireland is the trading name for the Institute of Accounting Technicians in Ireland Limited.

== Qualifications ==
The Accounting Technicians Ireland qualification combines professional exams with work experience. The Accounting Technicians Ireland diploma is divided into two parts, each of which is a qualification in its own right:

- Certificate for Accounting Technicians (1 year)
- Diploma for Accounting Technicians (2 years)

The certificate and diploma are National Framework of Qualifications Level 6 qualifications. The certificate and diploma are recognised as Qualifications and Credit Framework(QCF) level 4 and level 5 qualifications, respectively, in the UK.

Students study for the ATI qualifications full or part-time (normally as part of an apprenticeship with an accountant or company) through a college, or since 2008, directly with the ATI.

Members of the Accounting Technicians Ireland body are entitled to use the letters MIATI after their name. After eight years, members may be eligible to apply for fellow membership, who use the designation FIATI after their name. Other professional accountancy bodies recognise the qualification and offer exemptions from their examinations to Accounting Technicians Ireland graduates.

Students who complete the diploma can transfer to third year of some business, accounting, and finance degrees in DBS, IPA, Institute of Technology, Sligo, Waterford Institute of Technology, and CIT.

== History ==
Year	Important events
1983	Accounting Technicians Ireland is established. It is originally called The Institute of Accounting Technicians in Ireland (IATI), it was set up by representatives of the Institute of Chartered Accountants in Ireland (ICAI) and the Irish Institute of Accounting Technicians (IIAT). IATI shares premises with ICAI, shortly thereafter moves to Pembroke Road. Noel Stewart is appointed IATI chairman, a post which he held for five years
1985	IATI holds its first graduation ceremony of new members.
1988	Gregory Orr is appointed IATI chairman, a post he held for three years.
1991	Ray Gordon is appointed IATI chairman, and goes on to become the longest serving IATI chairman, holding the position for seven years.
1994	IATI is granted Charitable Status by the Revenue Commissioners, on the basis of its educational work.
1996	IATI changes its constitution at AGM, to ensure that members throughout the country are fairly represented on the board of directors. At least one director must be elected from Ulster and one from outside Leinster. A limit is also put on the length that directors may serve on the board.
1997	Ben Lynch retires as IATI Secretary, having filled that position for 15 years.
1998	Des Foley is appointed IATI chairman, the first elected IATI member to be appointed to the position.
1999	Angela Paisley becomes the first woman to be appointed IATI chairman.
2000	IATI's job placement service is registered as a limited company and begins trading independently of IATI under the name IATI Placement Service Limited.
2002	For the first time, IATI employs its own staff which were previously seconded from ICAI. Gay Sheehan is appointed as the Institute's first chief executive. IATI changes its constitution at AGM, to allow members to offer bookkeeping and non-regulated services to the public.
2005	IATI moves to new premises in Pembroke Road, Dublin 4.
2006	IATI Placement Service Limited adopts the trading name IATI Recruitment. IATI successfully applies for ISO 9001:2000 accreditation – the first accounting body of its kind in Ireland to gain this distinction.
2007	IATI changes its constitution at AGM, to provide for a Disciplinary Process, to be applied in cases of complaints against IATI members.
2007/08	The Director of Education, Director of Marketing and IT Project Manager join the CEO to form a senior management team. The first phase of the new syllabus and self-production of manuals is launched.
2008	IATI moves to temporary premises in Burlington Road, Dublin 4. IATI celebrates its 25th anniversary and surpasses 5,000 members for the first time.
2009	IATI changes its name to become Accounting Technicians Ireland and is formally launched by the Minister of State for Trade & Commerce, Billy Kelleher TD on 24thJune 2009. Accounting Technicians Ireland relocates headquarters to new premises on Pearse Street with partners Chartered Accountants Ireland. The Accounting Technicians Professional Education programme is launched. For the first time students can study directly with Accounting Technicians Ireland.
2010	Accounting Technicians Ireland secures recognition at Level 5 on the Qualifications and Credit Framework (QCF) in the UK. The new class of fellow membership is launched for more experienced members.

== Organisational structure ==
Accounting Technicians Ireland is managed and operated by a board of directors and 26 executive staff. The board of directors is made up of eight directors and a secretary. Four directors are elected members, and the others are nominated by their partner body, Chartered Accountants Ireland.

Working under senior management the following departments support students' and members' needs:

- Member Services
- Education
- IT
- Finance
- Marketing

== Membership structure ==
Accounting Technicians Ireland has four levels of membership.

- Student Members: all who have enrolled in an Accounting Technicians Ireland course and have yet to finish their final exams are classified as Student Members.
- Affiliate Members: Affiliate membership is open to all who have passed the Accounting Technicians Ireland exams but do not yet have the two years work experience required to complete the qualification and become Full members. Students can proceed straight to full membership once they pass their exams, if they have already gathered the required two years of relevant work experience. They are not required to become Affiliate Members first.
- Full Members (MIATI): a Full Member of Accounting Technicians Ireland is someone who has completed the Diploma for Accounting Technicians qualification. They will have passed all their exams, completed at least two years approved work experience within an accounting or finance environment, and have been conferred at a graduation ceremony. They are entitled to use the professional letters MIATI after their name.
- Fellow Members (FIATI): Fellow membership is open to anyone who has been a Full member of Accounting Technicians Ireland for eight years and has at least five years' experience of working in a senior position within their employment. They are entitled to use the professional letters FIATI to differentiate their senior experience and expertise within the accounting profession.

== Providers ==
As well as the ATI itself, a number of Schools and College provide Accounting Technician Ireland Training Programmes.

- Northern Regional College, Ballymena, Coleraine & Magherafelt.
- Belfast Metropolitan College, Belfast.
- North West Regional College, Derry, Omagh and Limavady
- Cavan Institute, Cavan Town, County Cavan
- Cork College of Commerce, Cork City
- Cork Institute of Technology, Bishopstown, County Cork.
- Mallow College of Further Education, Mallow, County Cork.
- Blackrock Further Education Institute Blackrock, County Dublin.
- Coláiste Íde College of Further Education, Finglas, Dublin.
- Plunket College of Further Education, Whitehall, Dublin.
- Rathmines College of Further Education, Rathmines, Dublin
- Galway-Mayo Institute of Technology
- Portarlington Adult Education Centre, Portarlington, County Laois.
- Dundalk Institute of Technology, Dundalk, County Louth.
- Beaufort College, Navan, County Meath.
- Monaghan Institute, Monaghan, County Monaghan
- Mullingar Community College, Mullingar, County Westmeath.

== See also ==
- Certified Accounting Technician - offered by the Association of Chartered Certified Accountants(ACCA)
- Association of Accounting Technicians - UK Accounting Technicians
