= Westport College of Further Education =

Mayo College of Further Education and Training
- Westport, County Mayo; Ireland

Information
- Type: College of further education
- Principal: Michael Murphy
- Staff: 90
- Enrolment: 1000
- Website: http://www.mayocollege.ie/

Mayo College of Further Education and Training (MCFET), is a Further Education and Training college with three campus locations in Ballina, Castlebar and Westport Ireland. It opened in April 2021 as a result of a merger of Castlebar College of Further Education and Westport College of Further Education. It specialising in Post Leaving Certificate (PLC) courses. Graduates have the option of directly entering the workforce, or using their results to apply to the Central Applications Office for 3rd Level places in colleges and universities around the country.

In April 2022 Mayo College assumed responsibility for VTOS provision in Co Mayo and operate 6 hubs in Ballina, Castlebar, Swinford, Achill, Belmullet and Ballinrobe for this purpose.
