= FÁS =

State employment agency in Ireland

Foras Áiseanna Saothair

Executive Agency overview
- Formed: January 1988
- Preceding agencies: An Chomhairle Oiliúna; National Manpower Service; Youth Employment Agency
- Dissolved: October 2013
- Superseding Executive Agency: SOLAS
- Jurisdiction: Ireland
- Headquarters: Dublin, Ireland
- Parent department: Department of Education and Skills
- Key document: Labour Services Act, 1987
- Website: FÁS website

FÁS (IPA: [fˠaːsˠ]), the common name for An Foras Áiseanna Saothair (Irish pronunciation: [ənˠ ˈfˠɔɾˠəsˠ ˈaːʃən̪ˠə ˈsˠiːhəɾʲ]; lit. 'The Training and Employment Authority'), was a state agency in Ireland with responsibility for assisting those seeking employment. It was established in January 1988 under the Labour Services Act 1987 and was run by a board composed of employer and trade union representatives. Dissolved in 2013, its functions were taken on by SOLAS and the Education and Training Board. On its establishment, the board was appointed by the Minister for Labour; on its dissolution, following transfers of functions, the board was appointed by the Minister for Education and Skills.

== Overview ==
The authority, whose Irish language name translates as "the Labour Facilities Foundation", was the successor to An Chomhairle Oiliúna ("the training council", commonly referred to as AnCO), the National Manpower Service and the Youth Employment Agency. The Irish word fás formed by the acronym means "growth", and the authority was created in 1980s Ireland during the long economic downturn of the time.

The authority ran a number of JobCentres in Ireland to facilitate those seeking employment; however it had occasionally been criticised, not least for the perception that it is simply a scheme to remove people from unemployment statistics – it had also been criticised for the expense of running it at almost €1 billion per annum. The authority ran training courses in various fields, through regional centres, although some of this work was transferred to institutes of technology – including the apprenticeships in various fields that it regulated.

== Apprenticeships ==
Apprenticeships regulated by FÁS include:

- Agricultural Mechanic
- Aircraft Mechanic
- Brick and Stonelaying
- Cabinet Making
- Carpentry and Joinery
- Construction plant fitting
- Electrical
- Electrical Instrumentation
- Electronic Security Systems
- Fitting
- Floor and Wall Tiling
- Heavy Vehicle Mechanics
- Industrial Insulation
- Instrumentation
- Metal Fabrication
- Motor Mechanics
- Painting and Decorating
- Plastering
- Plumbing
- Print Media
- Refrigeration and Air Conditioning
- Sheet Metalworking
- Toolmaking
- Vehicle Body Repairs
- Wood Machining

== Geoghegan controversy ==
Traditionally, the Director General of FÁS was a board member of Forfás. Brian Geoghegan (spouse of Mary Harney, then Minister for Health and Children) retired as Chairman of FÁS at the end of 2005 and was replaced by Peter McLoone. There had been some controversy regarding Geoghegan's position when it emerged he was also a board member of IBEC, the employer's union of Ireland. IBEC were critical of FÁS at times claiming, at various intervals, that some FÁS courses and schemes were a waste of money, taking potential employees off the live register who could otherwise be employed in mainstream positions. The fact that Geoghegan was married to Harney, a former Minister for Enterprise, Trade and Employment, led to some claims he had a conflict of interest.

== Expenses scandal ==
In September 2008, the Minister for Enterprise, Trade and Employment Mary Coughlan announced that the Comptroller and Auditor General would undertake an investigation of FÁS expenditure in light of what she saw as the evident public disquiet on the issue. The annual budget for FÁS at the time was around €1 billion. In November 2008, the Dáil Public Accounts Committee also began an investigation. However, it was information obtained under the Freedom of Information Act 1997 by journalist and senator Shane Ross which he published in the Sunday Independent that brought the FÁS expenses scandal to a head.

The documents obtained by Ross showed that some €643,000 had been spent over the course of four years on transatlantic travel promoting the agency's Science Challenge Programme. The expenses included items such as first-class air fares, business class air fares and fares paid for by FÁS for spouses, rounds of golf as well as nail and beauty treatment. It also revealed that three Government ministers and two junior ministers had attended in that time for inconsequential reasons.

This revelation caused major controversy and pressure was brought to bear on FÁS Director General Roddy Molloy to resign, although Taoiseach Brian Cowen spoke in support of Molloy both publicly and in the Dáil. Molloy appeared on The Pat Kenny Show on RTÉ Radio 1 to defend the expenses incurred.

However, under increasing pressure, Molloy resigned as Director General on 25 November 2008.

In September 2009 the board announced it would resign and The Irish Times announced that legislation to restructure the organisation was expected in the following four weeks.

The report into the breakdown of internal controls in FÁS by the Comptroller and Auditor General was published in 2010.

== Dissolution ==
Under the Further Education and Training Act 2013, FÁS was dissolved and its functions were transferred to a new agency, SOLAS. The training function of FÁS was absorbed into the restructured local Vocational Education Committees which were retitled Education and Training Boards in July 2013 under the Education and Training Boards Act 2013.
