= Cork College of Commerce =

College in Cork, Ireland

- Coláiste Tráchtála Chorcaí
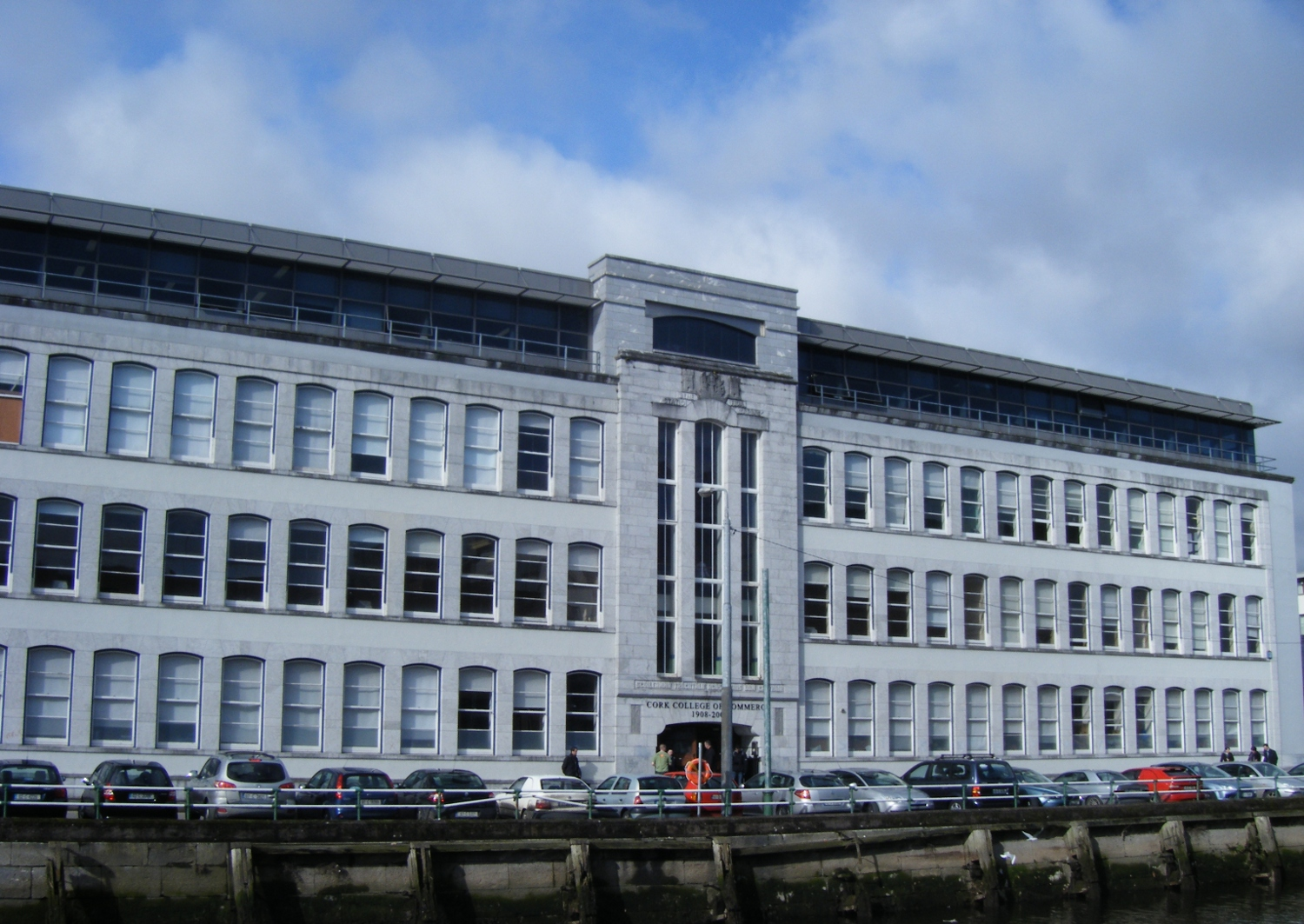
- Cork College of Commerce building on Morrison's Island, Cork
- Former names: School of Commerce and Domestic Science
- Type: Post Leaving Certificate; VEC
- Established: 1908
- Affiliations: FETAC; City & Guilds; ICM; IATI; CPA
- Location: Morrison's Island, Cork, Ireland; 51.8957°N 8.4694°W
- Website: corkcollegeofcommerce.ie

Cork College of Commerce is a college that was established in December 1908 in Cork, Ireland. It was originally named the "School of Commerce and Domestic Science".

== Purpose ==
The school originally offered secondary education. After 1991, when the last of its secondary school students finished their Leaving Certificate examinations, the college changed its focus, running both full-time day courses and a night school. Today, the college offers courses in topics such as computing, business studies, office administration, applied languages, health studies, beauty therapy, complementary therapy, childcare and Montessori, fashion, travel and tourism, adult Leaving Certificate and general interest courses. Many of the courses offered by the college result in a formal qualification, such as a qualification recognised by Accounting Technicians Ireland, or as a Certified Public Accountant.

== Facilities and services ==
The College of Commerce building on Morrison's Island was refurbished in 1998 and has a canteen, library, computer resources, interview and language training labs. The college provides corporate training and room rental facilities, as well as career and work placement services.

In 2019, the college opened its "West Cork Campus" in Skibbereen in West Cork, on a site formerly occupied by Rossa College.
