= SOLAS (Ireland) =

Irish state education agency

Executive Agency overview
- Formed: 27 October 2013; 12 years ago
- Preceding Executive Agency: Foras Áiseanna Saothair
- Jurisdiction: Ireland
- Headquarters: Castleforbes Road, Dublin
- Parent department: Department of Further and Higher Education, Research, Innovation and Science
- Website: solas.ie

SOLAS (Irish: An tSeirbhís Oideachais Leanúnaigh agus Scileanna, lit. 'Further Education and Skills Service') is a state agency in Ireland. SOLAS was established on 27 October 2013. Its mandate is set out in the Further Education and Training Act 2013. Among other functions such as research, monitoring and coordinating of further education and training provision, it also advances monies to education and training boards and other bodies engaged in the provision of further education and training programmes.

The sixteen education and training boards (ETBs) were established on the dissolution of the 33 Vocational Education Committees (VECs). At about the same time FAS, the national training and employment authority established in 1987, was also dissolved. The Department of Social Protection took over the responsibility from FÁS for Community Employment and Employment Services and over 800 former FAS staff. In 2014 the transfer of the former FAS training centre network, its 600+ staff and training facilities to the newly established education and training boards was successfully completed.

ETBs grant aided by SOLAS, offer around 270,000 places on 20,000+ further education and training courses in any one year. SOLAS also administers the Irish apprenticeship system. SOLAS publishes an annual services plan setting out what further education and training courses will be provided in the sixteen ETBs in any one year and how much these courses will cost.
