= Construction plant fitting in the Republic of Ireland =

The trade of construction plant fitting in Ireland is essentially the training of mechanics who specialise in working on the type of machinery found on building sites. Bull-dozers, dump trucks, four-wheel drive vehicles, cement mixers and water pumps are all types of equipment worked on by construction plant fitters (cp fitters).

Since 1979, and up until its closure in December 2010, the Cabra Training Centre was the only place in Ireland to offer Phase 2 apprenticeship training. Since the Cabra closure, the section has moved to a rented workshops about 300 metres away from the FAS Baldoyle Training Centre. This was to have been a temporary move while the main training centre was modified to accommodate the course. The promised work never happened, and the CP Fitters' section have been running courses from this temporary premises since May 2011. Generally speaking, four courses per year are run-with 12 apprentices on each course. In recent years, as many as 10 courses (120 apprentices) and as few as 2 courses (24 apprentices) have been run in Cabra.

Apprenticeship Training in the trade was regulated by FÁS, Ireland's Industrial Training Authority. The name of that organisation was changed to SOLAS. At present, apprenticeship training is standards based, and broken into 7 phases, with the odd-numbered phases being conducted on-the-job, and the even numbered phases being conducted in a temporary industrial unit rented by the Dublin and Dun Laoighre Education and Training Board (DDLETB) in Baldoyle (Phase 2), or the Institute of Technology in Cork (Phases 4 and 6). Since February 2016, it has become apparent that the Institute of Technology in Cork are now also offering Phase 2 training.

== Phase 2 training ==
Up until November 2010, the FÁS Training Centre in Cabra was the only training centre in the country to offer apprenticeship training at Phase 2 level. The Cabra Training Centre was closed down permanently on Christmas Eve, 2010, and no longer functions as a training centre. Since May 2011, Phase 2 apprenticeship training is being delivered in a satellite industrial unit close to the Baldoyle Training Centre. At present, two courses are running there concurrently. Since February 2016, Phase 2 training is also being offered in the Institute of Technology, Cork. During the 20 weeks allotted to Phase 2, apprentices will study 6 different modules:

- Engines
- Plant Vehicles
- Small Plant Machinery
- Transmissions
- Plant Vehicle Electricity
- Hydraulics
