= Waterford College of Further Education =

Irish post Leaving Certificate institute

- Established: 1906
- Affiliations: Waterford and Wexford Education and Training Board; QQI
- Principal: Noreen Reilly
- Location: Waterford; 52.25805°N 7.10942°W
- Website: http://www.wcfe.ie

Waterford College of Further Education (WCFE), previously called the Central Technical Institute (CTI), is a Post Leaving Certificate institute located on Parnell St., Waterford city. It was founded in 1906 and thus celebrated its centenary in 2005.

It offers a range of full-time and evening courses for post Leaving Certificate students in the areas of business, industry and the arts. In 2018 it enrolled 842 full-time day students and 300 part-time day and night students
