= St. Oliver Post Primary School =

School in County Meath, Ireland

Coordinates: 53.7088234°N 6.7487212°W

- Iarbhunscoil Oiliféir Naofa
- Oldcastle, County Meath; Ireland

Information
- Principal: Brendan Corcoran
- Enrollment: c. 600
- Website: stoliverpps.ie

Iarbhunscoil Oiliféir Naofa (St. Oliver Post Primary School) is a secondary school located in Oldcastle, County Meath, Ireland. A new building was opened in 2002 and the school celebrated its 50th anniversary in 2009, opening four new classrooms on the date. On 3 March 2007 the school won the All-Ireland Vocational Schools Championship Senior Cup 'B' Competition in Gaelic football.
