= Coláiste Íde College of Further Education =

Third-level institution in Dublin, Ireland

City of Dublin FET College Ide Finglas
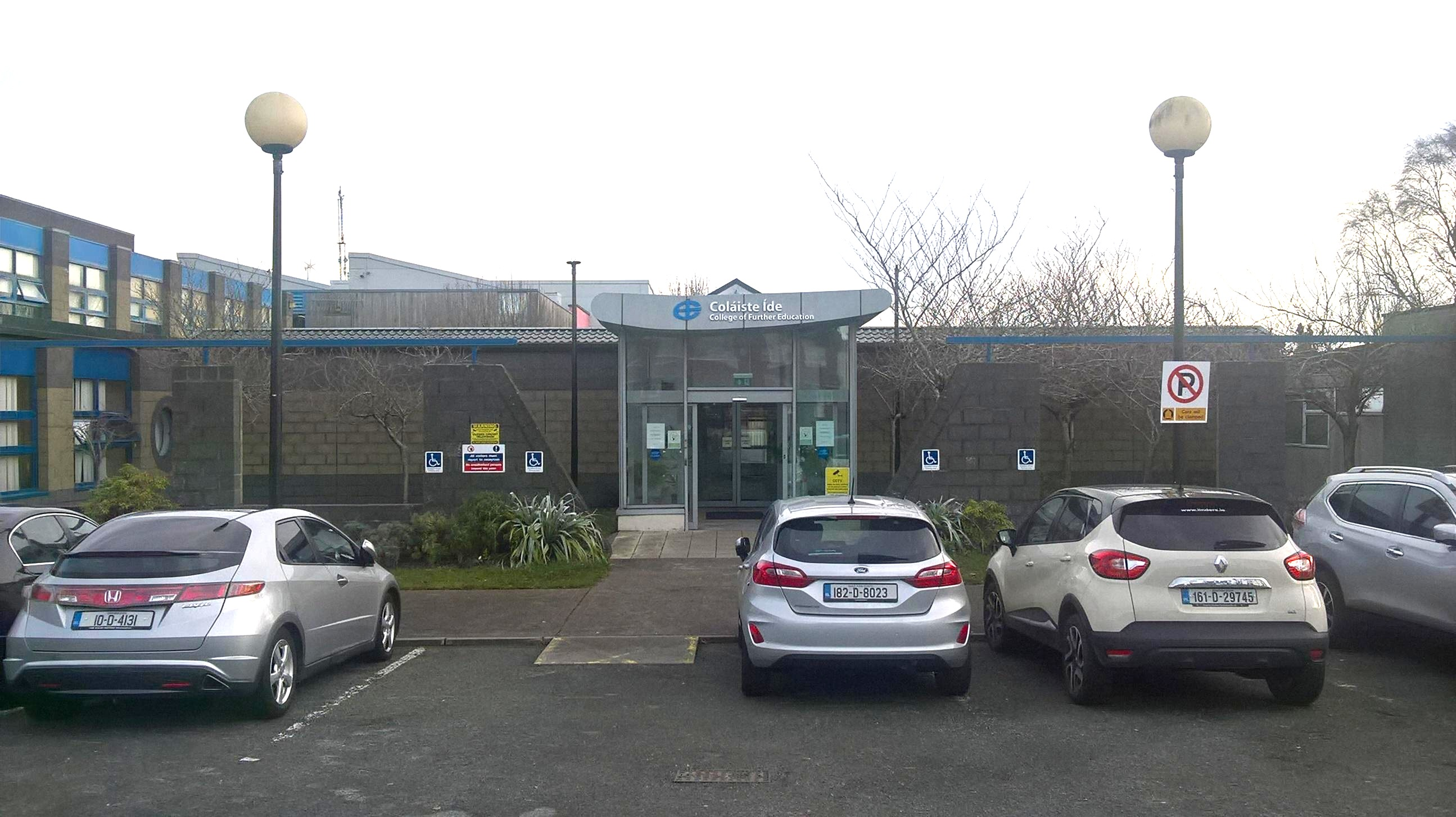

Location
- Finglas, Dublin; Ireland
- 53.3865°N 6.3118°W

Information
- Established: 1967
- Principal: Jean FitzGerald
- Affiliation: City of Dublin Education and Training Board; QQI
- Website: www.colaisteide.ie

City of Dublin FET college Ide Finglas is a coeducational, non-denominational centre of education funded and managed by the City of Dublin Education and Training Board to provide a Further Education service to the community of Finglas in Dublin North-West.

== College Facilities ==
- Open Learning Centre
- Lecture Rooms
- Learning Resource Centre
- Science Laboratory
- Industrial Kitchens
- Fashion / Textiles Studio
- Sculpture Studio
- Printmaking Studio
- Design/Computer Studio
- Photography Studio/Dark Room
- Sports Complex
- Computer Rooms
- All-weather Football Pitches
- Circuit Training Studio
- Aerobic studio

== Certification ==
All courses are certified by the FETAC and/or by the relevant Professional and Examining Bodies.

== External examining bodies ==
- Further Education and Training Awards Council (FETAC) – QQI from 2012.
- National Certificate in Exercise and Fitness (NCEF)
- Institute of Accounting Technicians in Ireland (IATI)
- City & Guilds of London
- International Therapy Examination Council (ITEC)
- International Air Transport Association (IATA)
- The National Training Provider
- Coaching Certification
- Football Association of Ireland (FAI)
- Royal Life Saving Society (RLSS)
- City of Dublin Vocational Education Committee (CDVEC)
- Irish Water Safety (IWS)
- GAA
- Swim Ireland
- HSA
- Airport Training Recruitment Services
