= Mallow College of Further Education =

College in Cork, Ireland

- Cork College of FET Mallow Campus
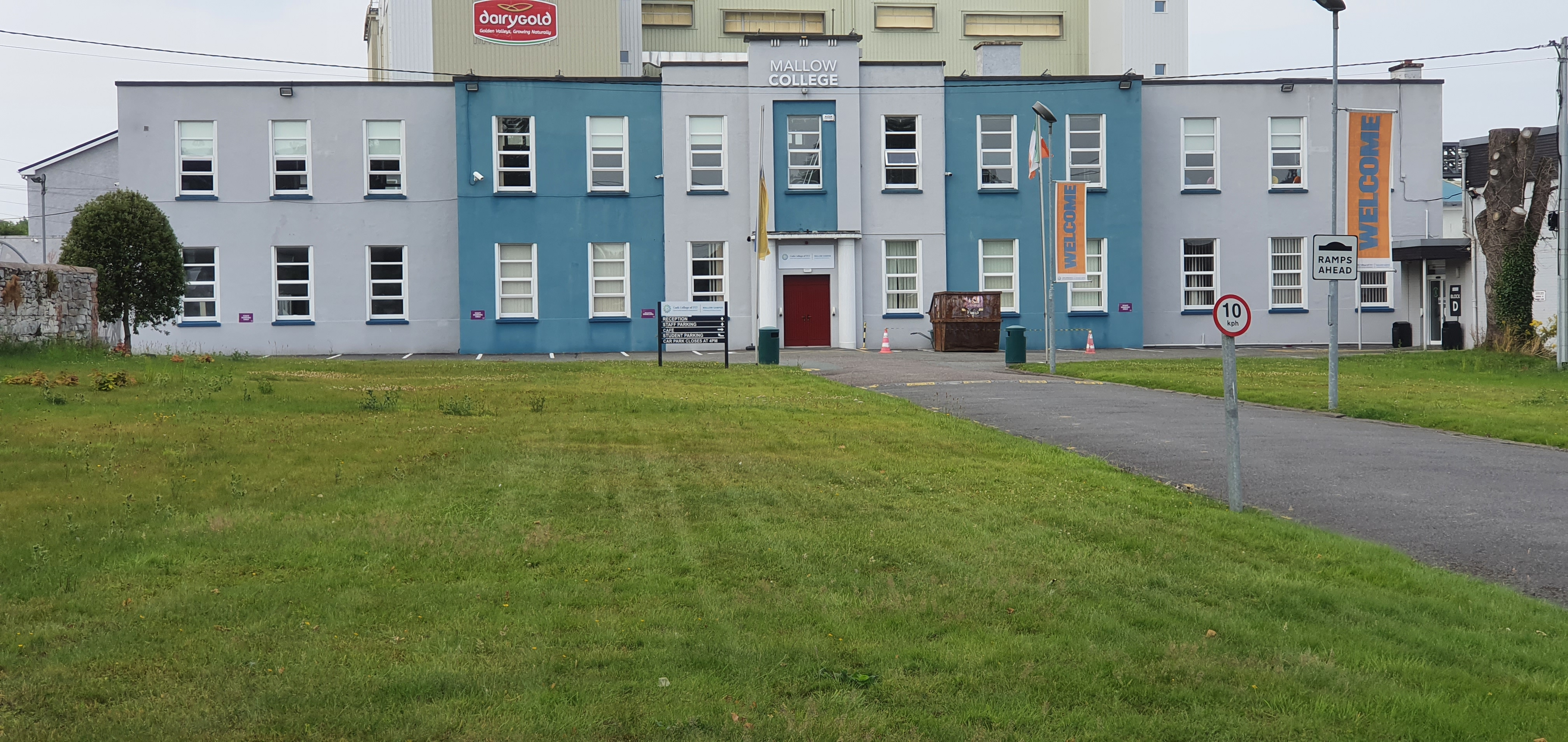
- Former names: Mallow College of Further Education
- Motto: See Further
- Type: Post Leaving Cert; ETB
- Established: 2016
- Affiliations: QQI, Accounting Technicians Ireland, iTEC, SOLAS, Cork ETB
- Principal: Denis Healy
- Students: 250 (full-time)
- Location: Mallow, County Cork, Ireland; 52.13844°N 8.65254°W
- Website: furthereducationcollege.ie

Mallow College of Further Education is a regional further education college campus of the Cork Education and Training Board, based in Mallow, County Cork in Ireland. It offers Post Leaving Certificate (PLC) courses.

Originally established as Mallow Vocational School in 1932, it was relocated from the town centre to its current location in the 1940s. In 1990, it was renamed Davis College in honour of Mallow-born writer Thomas Davis. In 2001, the secondary school was moved to its current location in Summerhill and its further education section, originally just two courses (business studies and computer studies for adults and secretarial), took up sole occupancy on the "Annabella" campus at West End street where it remains today. In 2016, Mallow College of Further Education was given its own independent status as a college separate from Davis College.
