= Independent College Dublin =

Irish private college

- Independent College Dublin
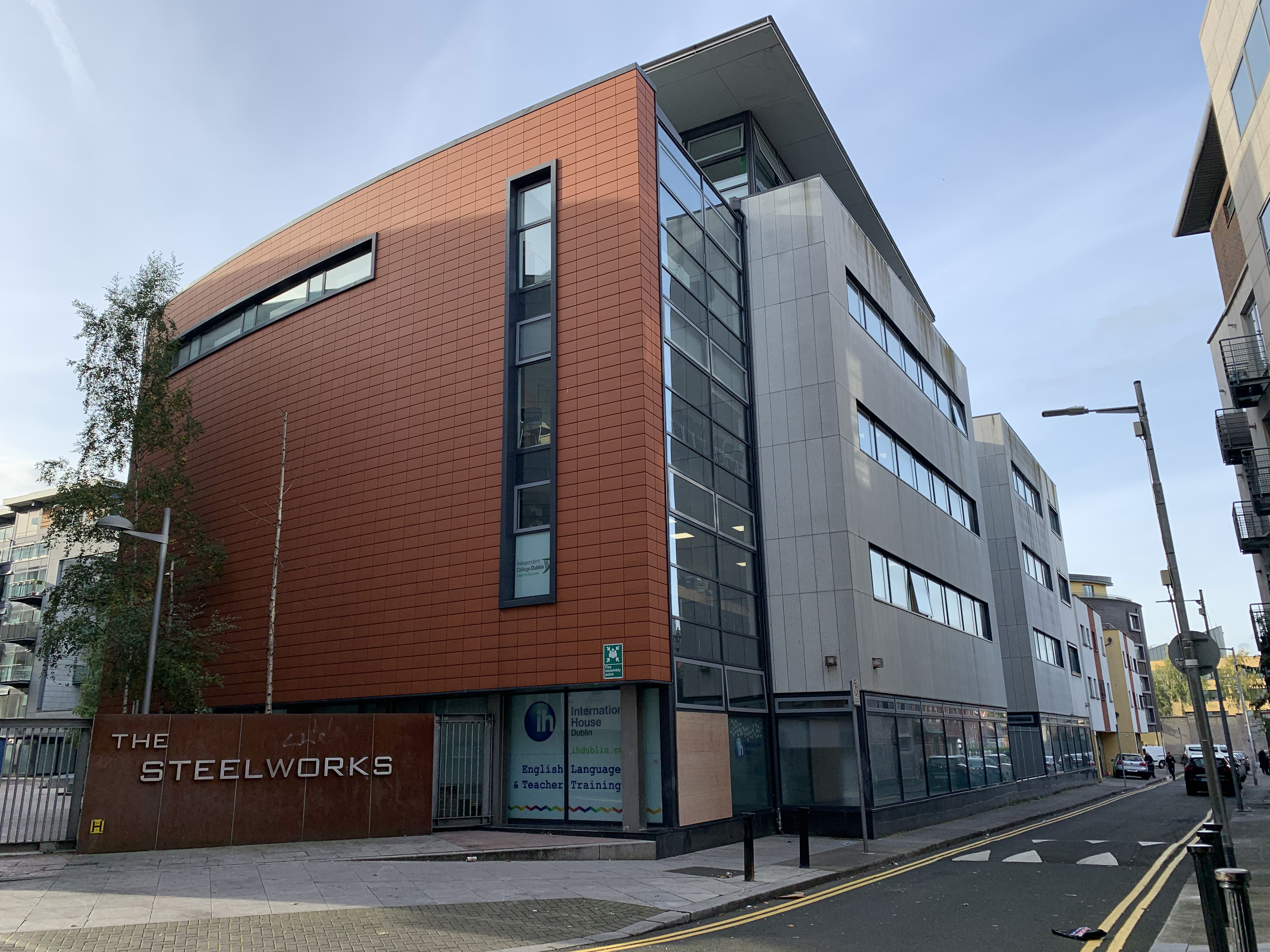
- Established: 2007
- President: Padraig Hourigan
- Director: Padraig Hourigan
- Location: Dublin, Ireland; 53.342679°N 6.258037°W
- Campus: Urban
- Website: www.independentcolleges.ie

Independent College Dublin is a college in Dublin, Ireland which offers courses at certificate, diploma, degree, and postgraduate levels, along with professional development courses. Independent College Dublin was established in Dublin in 2007.

The college was founded by the Independent News & Media plc group, with facilities on Dawson Street in Dublin city centre.

== Undergraduate Courses ==
=== School of Business ===
- BA (Hons) in Business Studies
- BA (Hons) in Accounting and Finance
- BA (Hons) in Marketing

== Postgraduate Courses ==
=== School of Law ===
- MA in Dispute Resolution

=== Professional Law Courses ===
- FE1 Exams Preparatory Course
- Honorable Society of King's Inns Entrance Examination Preparatory Course
- Certificate in Professional Legal Studies (Legal Executives) Part Time
- Diploma in Professional Legal Studies (Legal Executives) Part Time

== Diplomas & Certificates ==
- Diploma in Radio & Podcast Production: The Today FM School of Radio
- Management Diploma in Data Analytics for Business
