= Wellpark =

Townland and suburb of Galway, Ireland

Coordinates: 53.283°N 9.031°W

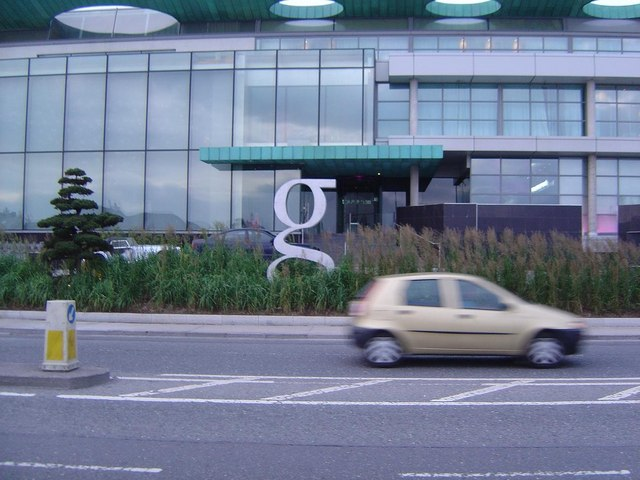
Galway's g Hotel is in the Wellpark Retail & Leisure development

Wellpark (Irish: Páirc an Tobair) is a townland and suburb of Galway city, Ireland. The area is bordered by the N6 Dublin Road to the south, the Tuam Road to the West and the suburb of Mervue on the east. It is approximately 1.5 kilometres (0.9 mi) east of Galway city, on the R336.

== Amenities ==
Wellpark, which overlooks Lough Atalia, has a harbour and shore fishing.

The area is also home to the Wellpark Retail Centre. This shopping centre contains outlets of Home Store + More, Woodie's DIY and Lidl. It also contains a cinema (temporarily closed as of August 2025) and is connected to the "g" Hotel and Spa.

The area is also home to several housing developments, and various employers in the Mervue Business Park and the Thermo King plant.

== Demographics ==
The electoral division of Wellpark, which has an area of 0.816 km^{2} (0.315 sq mi), was home to 1,509 people as of the 2002 census.
