= Vocational Education Committee =

Irish educational agency

A Vocational Education Committee (VEC) (Irish: Coiste Gairmoideachais) was a statutory local education body in Ireland that administered some secondary education, most adult education and a very small amount of primary education in the state. Before 1992 VECs had authority over the Dublin Institute of Technology and the Regional Technical Colleges. They existed from 1930 to 2013, when they were replaced by Education and Training Boards.

== Establishment ==
VECs were originally created by the Vocational Education Act 1930, as successors to the Technical Instruction Committees established by the Agriculture and Technical Instruction (Ireland) Act 1899. The original purpose of the committees was to administer continuation and technical education for 14- to 16-year-olds. Continuation education was defined as "general and practical training in preparation for employment in trades", while technical education was described as "pertaining to trades, manufacturers, commerce and other industrial pursuits". To this end the VECs were charged with the duty of setting up and maintaining vocational schools.

== Duties ==
Over time the duties of VECs increased, in particular in the area of adult education. These included:

Post-primary (secondary) education

- Vocational Schools
- Community Colleges

Further and adult education

- Post-Leaving Certificate courses (PLCs)
- Youthreach Services
- Vocational Training Opportunities Scheme (VTOS)
- Community Education
- Adult Literacy and Basic Education
- Back To Education Initiative (BTEI)
- Adult Refugee Programme (ARP)

VECs also administered maintenance grants and bursaries for third-level education until 2012.

In September 2008, County Dublin VEC opened the first Community National School, in Porterstown, Dublin 15. This marked the first time a VEC had become involved in primary school education.

== Organisation ==
VECs were originally established in each administrative county and county borough in the then Irish Free State. In addition, a VEC was formed in those municipal boroughs and urban districts which had a separate Technical Instruction Committee under the 1899 legislation (namely Bray, Drogheda, Sligo, Tralee and Wexford) and in the newly created Borough of Dún Laoghaire.

The number of VECs was reduced to the final number of thirty-three when five town committees were amalgamated with the adjacent county committees, leaving Dún Laoghaire as the only VEC area not consisting of a city or county.

=== Committees ===
Each Vocational Education Committee was elected by the county, borough or urban district council and consisted partly of councillors and partly of persons with an "interest and experience in education" and who could be recommended by bodies "interested in manufacture or trades".

The Vocational Education (Amendment) Act 2001 changed the composition of the committees, and parents of students under 18 and members of the staff were also entitled to elect committee members. Members could also be appointed to represent the interests of students, voluntary organisations, community organisations, Irish language interests and business.

== List of Vocational Education Committees 1997–2013 ==
VEC	Notes
County Carlow	
County Cavan	
County Clare	
City of Cork	
County Cork	
County Donegal	
City of Dublin	
County Dublin	Covered Fingal, South Dublin and part of Dún Laoghaire–Rathdown
Dún Laoghaire	Part of Dún Laoghaire–Rathdown (the former borough of Dún Laoghaire)
City of Galway	
County Galway	
Kerry Education Service (County Kerry VEC)	Absorbed Town of Tralee VEC 1997
County Kildare	
County Kilkenny	
County Laois	
County Leitrim	
City of Limerick	
County Limerick	
County Longford	
County Louth	Absorbed Town of Drogheda VEC 1997
County Mayo	
County Meath	
County Monaghan	
County Offaly	
County Roscommon	
County Sligo	Absorbed Town of Sligo VEC 1997
North Tipperary	
South Tipperary	
City of Waterford	
County Waterford	
County Westmeath	
County Wexford	Absorbed Town of Wexford VEC 1997
County Wicklow	Absorbed Town of Bray VEC 1997

== Amalgamations and abolition ==
In October 2010 the Department of Education announced that the number of VECs was to be reduced from 33 to 16 by amalgamation In 2011 the new government confirmed that scale of reduction but revised the scheme of amalgamations It subsequently announced the establishment of SOLAS, a new steering and funding agency to cover the further education provision of the VECs, which also absorbed the training activities formerly carried out by FÁS.

Under the terms of the Education and Training Boards Act 2013 the VECs were dissolved, being replaced by 16 Education and Training Boards (ETBs) on 1 July 2013:

1. County Dublin VEC and Dún Laoghaire VEC replaced by Dublin & Dún Laoghaire ETB
2. City of Dublin VEC replaced by City of Dublin ETB
3. City of Galway VEC, County Galway VEC and County Roscommon VEC replaced by Galway & Roscommon ETB
4. County Cork VEC and City of Cork VEC replaced by Cork ETB
5. County Kerry VEC replaced by Kerry ETB
6. City of Limerick VEC, County Limerick VEC and County Clare VEC replaced by Limerick & Clare ETB
7. City of Waterford VEC, County Waterford VEC and County Wexford VEC replaced by Waterford & Wexford ETB
8. North Tipperary VEC and South Tipperary VEC replaced by Tipperary ETB
9. County Donegal VEC replaced by Donegal ETB
10. County Kildare VEC and County Wicklow VEC replaced by Kildare & Wicklow ETB
11. County Mayo VEC, County Sligo VEC and County Leitrim VEC replaced by Mayo, Sligo & Leitrim ETB
12. County Cavan VEC and County Monaghan VEC replaced by Cavan & Monaghan ETB
13. County Laois VEC and County Offaly VEC replaced by Laois & Offaly ETB
14. County Carlow VEC and County Kilkenny VEC replaced by Kilkenny & Carlow ETB
15. County Longford VEC and County Westmeath VEC replaced by Longford & Westmeath ETB
16. County Meath VEC and County Louth VEC replaced by Louth & Meath ETB
