= Post Leaving Certificate =

Informal term for tertiary courses in Ireland

Post-Leaving Certificate (PLC) courses (Irish: Cúrsa Iar Ard-Teistiméarachta) are a set of courses and qualifications run in Ireland for students who have finished their secondary education. The term refers to post-secondary education courses which are not found within the higher education sector, but the further education sector in Ireland. The majority of students who enrol on a PLC course are under 23, but mature students are also welcome, and increasingly enrolling on such courses. A Post-Leaving Certificate course is taken after a student has passed their Leaving Certificate, and is generally between one and two years in duration. PLC courses are aimed primarily at students who would like to develop vocational or technological skills in order to enter an occupation, or progress to higher education.

== Administration and Delivery ==
The majority of Post Leaving Certificate courses are certified by Quality and Qualifications Ireland (QQI), who monitor the quality of the courses, set learning outcomes and curricula, and determine national award standards. This was previously overseen by the Further Education and Training Awards Council (FETAC), until it was subsumed into QQI in 2012. QQI does not, however deliver the award programmes itself - it is up to each individual provider to deliver each programme in a suitable way.

Usually, courses are provided by ETBs (Education and Training Boards), across Ireland. The majority of courses take place in Colleges/Institutes of Further Education, however they are increasingly being taught in private colleges, particularly in the Dublin area. Some providers also provide degrees, using PLC courses as a stepping stone for students within their own institution.

PLC courses are generally found at Levels 5 and 6 of the Irish National Framework of Qualifications (NFQ), meaning learners graduate with a Level 5 Certificate or a Level 6 Advanced Certificate in a given subject area. Most subjects are vocational in nature, though not all (such as 5M2073 European Studies).

Providers sometimes offer courses leading to awards not on the Irish NFQ, but which are nonetheless considered as 'PLC' courses. Examples include the BTEC Higher National Diploma or Higher National Certificate. Providers may also offer awards certified by other qualification authorities such as the Royal Society of Arts (RSA), City & Guilds, Institute of Commercial Management, BTEC/Edexcel, the Irish Exporters Association and ITEC.

== Course Structure ==
PLC courses are usually full-time, and run for one or two years. They generally focus on practical work, academic basics, and work experience in a relevant industry. Courses (major awards) are usually composed of eight or more component awards (or 'modules'), which add up to at least 120 FET credits; award codes beginning with 5M or 6M designate major awards (for example, 5M2102 Business Studies), while codes beginning with 5N or 6N designate minor awards (for example, 6N1957 Special Needs Assisting). Learners may accumulate credit over more than one sitting, i.e. they may study for awards at their own pace, completing modules one-by-one if they so wish.

Modules (and in turn major awards as a whole) are graded as follows:

Module and Certificate Grading - Levels 4, 5 and 6 on the Irish NFQ
Grade	Percentage
Distinction (Gradam)	80 - 100%
Merit (Fiúntas)	65 - 79%
Pass (Pas)	50 - 65%
Unsuccessful (Gan Rath)	0-50%

Depending on the grade they receive in each module, learners can receive up to 390 CAO points, which may be used competitively for entry purposes into universities, Institutes of Technology and higher education institutions in Ireland.

Some courses which are offered nationwide include:

- Applied Sciences
- Art and Design
- Business Studies
- Electronics
- Computing
- Beauty Therapy
- Media Studies
- Office Administration
- Legal studies
- Marketing
- Childcare Studies
- Work as a Special Needs Assistant (SNA) and supporting learning in schools
- Health care support
- Security Studies
- Dental Nursing (see Dental Nurse)

== See also ==
- Leaving Certificate
- Education in the Republic of Ireland
- List of universities in the Republic of Ireland
