= Education and Training Board =

Irish statutory local governing bodies

An Education and Training Board (ETB) (Irish: Bord Oideachais agus Oiliúna) is one of sixteen statutory local education bodies that deliver a wide range of education services in Ireland. ETBs manage a large number of secondary schools, further education colleges and training centres, multi-faith primary schools (Community National Schools) and adult education centres throughout the country. They deliver a growing number of apprenticeships and traineeships across the State.

Originating from the Education and Training Boards Act 2013, ETBs came into existence on 1 July 2013, when they replaced the existing system of Vocational Education Committees (VECs) that had been in place since 1930. The training functions, which were the responsibility of the national training and employment authority FÁS, and which had been taken on by the VECs when FÁS was dissolved, were also transferred to the ETBs. ETBs are statutorily responsible for the provision of all further education and training in Ireland.

Also deriving from the Education and Training Boards Act, Education and Training Boards Ireland (ETBI) was established in 2013, replacing the Irish Vocational Education Association (IVEA). ETBI is the national representative association for the sixteen ETBs, and works to protect, promote and enhance the interests of vocational education and training within the wider education sector and the country at large.

== Number and constitution ==
There are 16 regional ETBS, replacing 33 VECs. On formation in 2013, the existing VEC members became members of the replacement boards.

Each board has 21 members:

- 12 local authority representatives
- 2 staff representatives
- 2 parents' representatives
- 5 members from bodies representing community/business interests: one community/business interest representative must be drawn from business, industry and employers; one from learners' representative bodies and one must be representative of "bodies connected to school management or leadership".

ETB	Former VECs	Headquarters	Website
Cavan and Monaghan ETB	County Cavan VEC, County Monaghan VEC	Monaghan, sub-office in Cavan Town	cavanmonaghan.etb.ie
City of Dublin ETB	City of Dublin VEC	Ballsbridge	cityofdublin.etb.ie
Cork ETB	City of Cork VEC, County Cork VEC	Greater Cork	cork.etb.ie
Dublin and Dún Laoghaire ETB	County Dublin VEC, Dún Laoghaire VEC	Tallaght	ddletb.ie
Donegal ETB	County Donegal VEC	Letterkenny	donegaletb.ie
Galway and Roscommon ETB	City of Galway VEC, County Galway VEC, County Roscommon VEC	Athenry, sub-office in Roscommon Town	galwayroscommon.etb.ie
Kerry ETB	County Kerry VEC	Tralee	kerryetb.ie
Kildare and Wicklow ETB	County Kildare VEC, County Wicklow VEC	Naas, sub-office in Wicklow	kildarewicklow.etb.ie
Kilkenny and Carlow ETB	County Carlow VEC, County Kilkenny VEC	Carlow Town	kilkennycarlow.etb.ie
Laois and Offaly ETB	County Laois VEC, County Offaly VEC	Portlaoise	laoisoffalyetb.ie
Limerick and Clare ETB	City of Limerick VEC, County Limerick VEC, County Clare VEC	Greater Limerick	limerickclare.etb.ie
Longford and Westmeath ETB	County Longford VEC, County Westmeath VEC	Mullingar	longfordwestmeath.etb.ie
Louth and Meath ETB	County Louth VEC, County Meath VEC	Drogheda	louthmeath.etb.ie
Mayo, Sligo and Leitrim ETB	County Leitrim VEC, County Mayo VEC, County Sligo VEC	Castlebar, sub-offices in Sligo and Carrick-on-Shannon	mayosligoleitrim.etb.ie
Tipperary ETB	North Tipperary VEC, South Tipperary VEC	Nenagh, sub-office in Clonmel	tipperary.etb.ie
Wexford and Waterford ETB	County Wexford VEC, County Waterford VEC, City of Waterford VEC	Wexford, sub-offices in Dungarvan and Waterford	waterfordwexford.etb.ie
