= Third-level education in the Republic of Ireland =

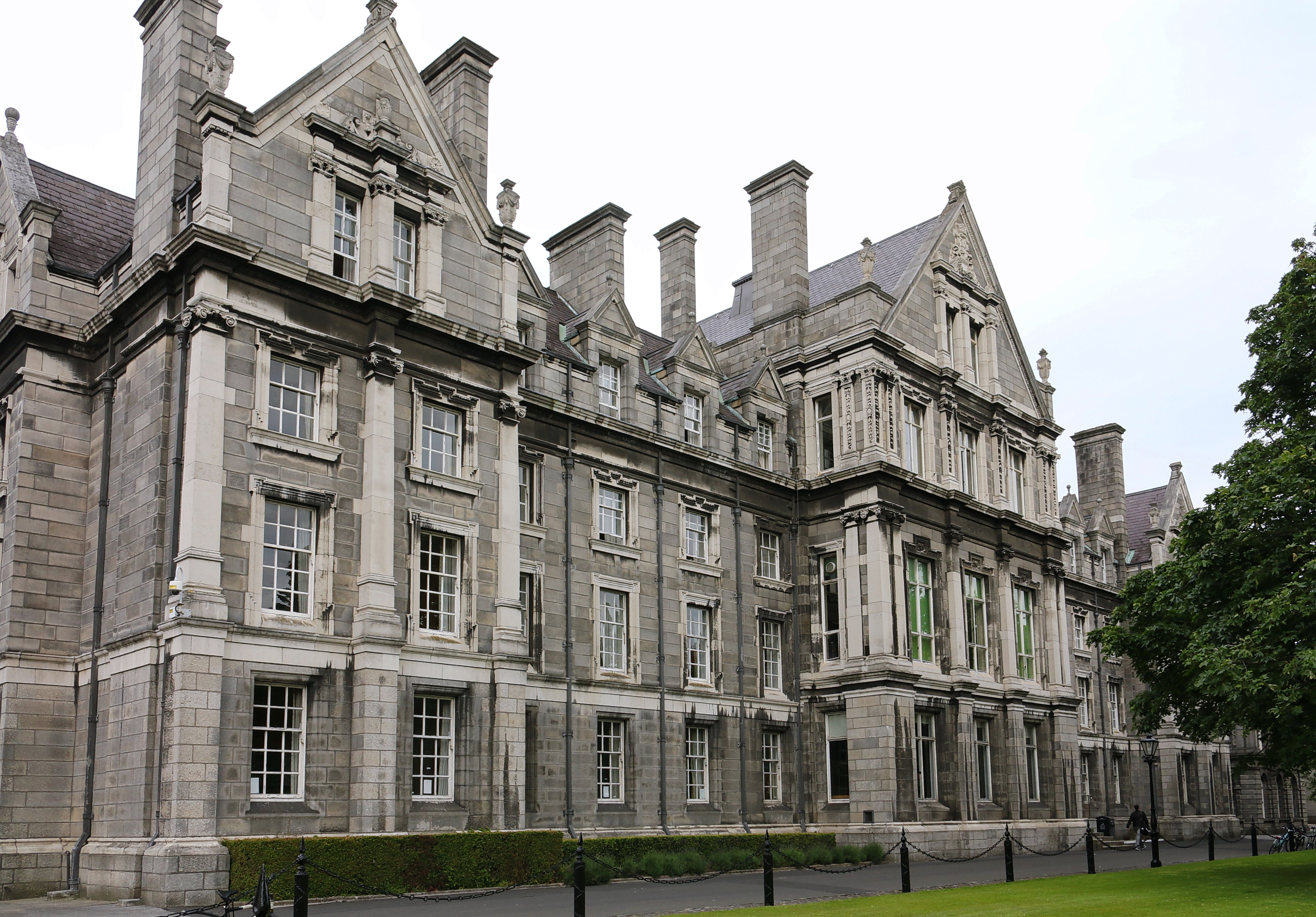
Graduates Memorial Building, Trinity College, Dublin

Third-level education in Ireland includes all education after second-level, encompassing higher education in universities and colleges and further education on Post Leaving Certificate (PLC) and other courses.

The degree-awarding institutions which can grant awards at all academic levels are the University of Dublin, National University of Ireland (Cork, Dublin, Galway and Maynooth), University of Limerick, Dublin City University, Technological University Dublin, the Royal College of Surgeons in Ireland, Munster Technological University, Technological University of the Shannon: Midlands Midwest, Atlantic Technological University and South East Technological University, as well as St Patrick's College, Maynooth (Pontifical University). Quality and Qualifications Ireland, a State agency, can grant awards in other institutions directly, or delegate the authority to do so. The King's Inns of Dublin has a limited role in education specialising in the preparation of candidates for the degree of barrister-at-law to practice as barristers. Medical schools in Ireland also have particular regulation. There were seven establishments of higher education within Ireland ranked among the top 500 universities worldwide by the Times Higher Education Supplement in 2023.

== Framework ==
EQF level	EHEA cycle	NFQ level	Major award types
1		1	Level 1 Certificate
1		2	Level 2 Certificate
2		3	Level 3 Certificate; Junior Certificate
3		4	Level 4 Certificate; Leaving Certificate
4		5	Level 5 Certificate; Leaving Certificate
5		6	Advanced Certificate
5	Short cycle within 1st	6	Higher Certificate
6	1st	7	Ordinary Bachelor's degree
6	1st	8	Honours bachelor's degree Higher diploma
7	2nd	9	Master's degree Postgraduate diploma
8	3rd	10	Doctorate degree Higher doctorate

== Governance, funding and quality assurance ==
Higher education policy is overseen by the Department of Further and Higher Education, Research, Innovation and Science. The Higher Education Authority (HEA) is the statutory planning and development body for higher education and research in Ireland, and is the funding authority for universities, institutes of technology and other designated higher education institutions.

The Higher Education Authority Act 2022 replaced the Higher Education Authority Act 1971 and provided for changes to the functions and governance of the HEA, including oversight of designated institutions of higher education. Designated institutions under the Act include established universities, technological universities, institutes of technology, the National College of Art and Design and certain other authorised providers.

Quality and Qualifications Ireland (QQI) is the state agency responsible for promoting the quality, integrity and reputation of Ireland's further and higher education system. QQI also validates education and training programmes offered by providers within its remit.

== Tertiary pathways ==
The National Tertiary Office was established within the Higher Education Authority in 2022 to develop joint further and higher education degree programmes. The office is jointly managed by the HEA and SOLAS. These tertiary programmes allow students to begin in further education before progressing to higher education to complete a fully accredited degree.

The development of tertiary pathways forms part of the Government's policy for a more unified tertiary system, intended to allow further education and training, higher education, and research and innovation to work more closely together.

== Teaching and learning policy ==
The National Forum for the Enhancement of Teaching and Learning in Higher Education operates under the auspices of the HEA and advises on teaching and learning enhancement in Irish higher education. In 2025, a new national Strategy for Teaching and Learning in Higher Education was launched to guide HEA policy, investment and sectoral engagement over the following three to five years. The HEA also published a national policy framework on generative AI in higher education teaching and learning in December 2025.

== Institutions ==
Irish higher education institutions include universities, technological universities, institutes of technology, colleges of education and specialist institutions. Since the Technological Universities Act 2018, most former institutes of technology have amalgamated into five technological universities, with Dundalk Institute of Technology and Dún Laoghaire Institute of Art, Design and Technology remaining as institutes of technology.

The Irish universities include the University of Dublin, better known by the name of its sole college, Trinity College Dublin, the four constituent universities of the National University of Ireland, two universities established in 1989, five technological universities formed by the amalgamation of Institutes of Technology and a professional medical institution. Some colleges are constituent colleges of universities, while others are designated institutions of the State agency Quality and Qualifications Ireland (QQI), which succeeded the Higher Education and Training Awards Council. The latter include the remaining Institutes of technology in Ireland in Dundalk and Dún Laoghaire, Colleges of Education, and other independent colleges. Some colleges have "delegated authority" from QQI, this allows them to confer and validate awards in their own name.

Some institutions such as the University of Limerick, Technological University Dublin (TU Dublin), and Dublin City University (DCU) have completed a process of modularising their courses (others are still in a transition phase), mostly using the ECTS. The Bologna process and applied research are the current concerns of national educational policy, additional concerns include the structures of the National University of Ireland. In 2019 TU Dublin amalgamated three institutions in the Dublin region (Dublin Institute of Technology, Institute of Technology, Blanchardstown, and Institute of Technology, Tallaght), and in 2021 Munster Technological University amalgamated two institutions in the Munster region (Cork Institute of Technology, and Institute of Technology, Tralee), while the Technological University of the Shannon: Midlands Midwest was formed by the merger of Limerick Institute of Technology and Athlone Institute of Technology. The Atlantic Technological University, through the merger of Galway Mayo Institute of Technology, Institute of Technology, Sligo and Letterkenny Institute of Technology and South East Technological University with the merger of Institute of Technology, Carlow and Waterford Institute of Technology in 2022.

The Marks & Standards document, offered by most institutions, can be consulted for information on the range and criteria set down for awards, while programme specifications offer additional information. In contrast to practice in the rest of the education system, entry tends to be highly competitive for school leavers; the so-called "Points Race" administered by the Central Applications Office (CAO). In 2001 the percentage of school leavers transferring to third level exceeded 50% for the first time, while as of 2005 it was in excess of 55% and expected to grow at approximately 1% per annum for the next decade.

There are over 25 third-level courses at graduate and postgraduate level offered through the Irish language. Acadamh na hOllscolaíochta Gaeilge is the Irish language Department of the University of Galway and it has different off-campus centres throughout the Gaeltacht regions. Dublin City University has an Irish language department called Fiontar. University College Dublin (UCD), TU Dublin, and Atlantic Technological University (ATU) also offer similar courses.

All but two of the eleven universities in Ireland offer "open" (omnibus entry) Bachelor of Arts degrees through the CAO where the student can choose their specialisation after their first year of study. The two universities that do not offer "open" (omnibus entry) arts degrees, Trinity College Dublin and DCU, do still offer Bachelor of Arts degrees in specific areas of study such as Drama Studies, Journalism, Latin, History, Japanese, and International Relations.

In one, Trinity College Dublin, the applicants wishing to read an Arts degree may apply to the college to read a combination of two subjects, such as French and Philosophy – which the student may continue to read jointly or with focus on one. DCU's de facto omnibus entry arts degree is offered by St. Patrick's College of Education (a college of DCU) and is titled "BA in Humanities". All Hallows College (a college of DCU) offer BA in humanities, theology pastoral care, and English.

Entry into higher education institutions is normally done through the CAO. In this way, students wishing to enter university apply to the CAO rather than the individual university. Places in courses are usually awarded based on results in the Leaving Certificate Examination or any international equivalent. Each university has a minimum entry requirement, usually requiring a pass grade in either English or Irish, as well as maths. Some also require a pass grade in a modern continental European language (French, German, Spanish or Italian). Each individual course has further entry requirements, for example, science courses usually require a certain grade in one or two sciences. The student must also achieve the number of points required for the course under the points system. However, universities also have systems in place for accepting mature students, and students who have successfully completed a Post Leaving Certificate or Further Education course.

Entry into third-level is generally very high in Ireland (as it also is in Northern Ireland), and among young adults (those aged 25 to 34), 41.6% of them have attained third-level degrees—the second highest level in the EU after Cyprus, and substantially ahead of the average of 29.1%. Broken down by gender, approximately 43% of women and 40% of men Ireland attend third level education.

== International students ==
Ireland's higher education system includes a substantial international student population. According to HEA statistics, there were 44,535 non-Irish domiciled enrolments in publicly funded higher education institutions in 2024/25, including 32,940 non-EU enrolments. The most common non-Irish domiciles were India, the United States and China.

== Participation and enrolment ==
In 2024/25, there were 278,880 student enrolments across all modes of study in Ireland's publicly funded higher education institutions, an increase of 4.9% from 265,905 in 2023/24. Undergraduate enrolments accounted for 212,345 students, while postgraduate enrolments accounted for 66,535 students.

== Undergraduate fees ==
Under the "Free Fees Initiative" the Government pays the tuition fees of students who meet relevant course, nationality and residence requirements as set down under the initiative. These requirements include:

- Holding EU nationality, or being a national of a member country of the European Economic Area, the United Kingdom or Switzerland, or having been granted official refugee status.
- Having been resident in an EU Member State for at least three of the five years preceding entry to the course.
- Not undertaking a second undergraduate course.

Students are required to pay a student contribution charge. The charge replaced the former registration fee, which had been criticised as an unofficial fee.

The student contribution was reduced on a temporary basis in several budgets during the early 2020s. In Budget 2026, the Government announced a permanent €500 reduction in the student contribution charge, reducing the maximum annual charge from €3,000 to €2,500. For the 2025/26 academic year, students eligible for the Free Fees Initiative are required to pay a student contribution charge of €2,500 per year.

== Postgraduate fees ==
The Free Fees Initiative only covers undergraduate degrees, so postgraduate students normally pay tuition fees. Fee levels vary by course and institution, and EU fees are typically lower than non-EU fees.

== Further education ==
Further education is vocational and technical education and training in post-compulsory education. Awards are offered by a multitude of bodies, both ad-hoc and statutory. Typical areas included are craft and trade apprenticeships, childcare, farming, retail, and tourism. These are typical areas of the economy that do not depend on multinational investment and recognition. There are many different types of further education awards, known as Post Leaving Certificates.

The Quality and Qualifications Ireland (QQI) conferred awards in the extra-university system. Further education has expanded immensely in recent years helped by the institutions, and because of this the type and range of these awards have been formalised to restore confidence. There are a number of schemes enabling progression for holders of QQI awards to universities and institutes of technology. QQI awards carry points that can be used to access higher education.

== Grade inflation ==
Ireland has a higher proportion of third-level graduates than any other EU country. At the same time, the proportion of graduates with first-class honours has reached record levels. There is disagreement about whether this increase is due to improved methods of instructing increasingly motivated students, or simple grade inflation. Former president Michael D. Higgins believes that it is due to grade inflation, and has expressed concern about the continued quality and value of university degrees. Whatever the reason might be, employers increasingly examine graduates' extracurricular activities, work experiences, and soft skills as they search for the most able applicants.

== List of higher education establishments ==
These are lists of colleges and universities within Ireland; some colleges are constituent colleges of universities.

=== Universities ===
Recognised as Universities under the Universities Act, 1997 as amended:

- Dublin City University
- National University of Ireland
  - Maynooth University
  - University of Galway
  - University College Cork
  - University College Dublin
- Royal College of Surgeons in Ireland
- University of Limerick
- University of Dublin
  - Trinity College

=== Technological Universities ===
Technological Universities have been formed by the merger of former Institutes of Technology.

- Atlantic Technological University
- Munster Technological University
- South East Technological University
- Technological University Dublin
- Technological University of the Shannon: Midlands Midwest

=== Institutes of technology ===
- Dún Laoghaire Institute of Art, Design and Technology
- Dundalk Institute of Technology

=== Pontifical University ===
- St Patrick's College, Maynooth (also known as Maynooth College or the Pontifical University at Maynooth)

=== Colleges of education ===
- St Angela's College of Education, Sligo ^{ATU}
- Marino Institute of Education ^{DU}
- Mary Immaculate College, Limerick ^{UL}
- St. Patrick's College, Thurles ^{UL}

=== Recognised, associated or constituent colleges of Irish universities ===
- Institute of Public Administration ^{NUI}
- Irish School of Ecumenics ^{DU}
- National College of Art and Design ^{UCD}
- National Maritime College of Ireland ^{MTU}
- Shannon College of Hotel Management ^{UG}

=== National institutions ===
- Dublin Institute for Advanced Studies
- Garda Síochána College
- Military College, Curragh Camp
- National Ambulance Service College

=== State-aided and chartered institutions ===
- Honorable Society of King's Inns
- National College of Ireland (formerly National College of Industrial Relations)
- Royal Irish Academy of Music
- Royal College of Physicians of Ireland (postgraduate medical qualifications)

=== Other institutions ===
- American College Dublin
- Burren College of Art
- Carmelite Institute of Britain and Ireland, theology programmes validated by St Patrick's College, Maynooth
- Cavan Institute
- Christian Leadership in Education Office (CLEO), postgraduate education programmes validated by the University of Hull
- Church of Ireland Theological Institute (partly in cooperation with Trinity College Dublin)
- City Colleges
- Coláiste na hÉireann
- Coláiste Stiofáin Naofa
- College of Progressive Education
- Cork College of Commerce
- Digital Skills Academy (historically validated by Dublin Institute of Technology and Boston College)
- Dorset College
- Dublin Business School
- Dublin Institute of Design (Closed 2023)
- Gaiety School of Acting
- Galway Business School
- Global Center for Advanced Studies (GCAS College Dublin)
- The Grafton Academy of Fashion Design
- Griffith College Cork
- Griffith College Dublin
- Griffith College Limerick
- Hibernia College
- IBAT College Dublin
- ICD Business School
- Independent College Dublin
- Irish Bible Institute (a component of the University of Wales (2005–2013), York St John University since 2014.)
- Irish Management Institute ^{UCC}
- Kimmage Development Studies Centre (merged into Maynooth University)
- Mallow College of Further Education
- Newman College Ireland
- Pitman Training Ireland
- Portobello Institute
- The Priory Institute (validated by Institute of Technology, Tallaght)
- Spirituality Institute for Research and Education (Masters validated by Waterford Institute of Technology)
- St. John's Central College, Cork
- St. Nicholas Montessori College
- St. Patrick's, Carlow College
- Setanta College

== Foreign institutions with a presence in Ireland ==
As well as "Study Abroad" programmes from US universities, a UK institution, a French business school and a number of US universities have presences in Ireland:

- Boston College Ireland – delivers "Study Abroad" and summer programmes on St. Stephens Green, central Dublin
- Champlain College Ireland – delivers "Study Abroad" programmes to US students at a campus on Leeson Street, central Dublin
- Duquesne University – students study in UCD and stay at Duquesne University's St. Michael's House facility
- École de management de Normandie – A Dublin campus opened in 2017
- Georgia Southern University – Opened in 2019, Georgia Southern University has a campus in Wexford Town
- University of Notre Dame – have two centres in Ireland, the new Notre Dame Center at Kylemore Abbey in Connemara and O'Connell House in Dublin from which students study at Trinity or UCD
- Open University – the UK based Open University has an Irish office in Dublin
- Sacred Heart University – has an Irish studies base in Dingle, County Kerry

== Foreign institutions who validate programmes in Ireland ==
Historically a number of institutions, including seminaries such as St. Patrick's, Carlow College, St. Kieran's College, Kilkenny, St. Patrick's College, Thurles, and Tullabeg College, would have prepared students for examinations with the University of London. In recent years a number of mainly private colleges have had programmes accredited by UK universities.

- University of Chester – National Training Centre, Dublin
- University of Dundee – in partnership with Ballyfermot College of Further Education since 2004
- University of East London – Institute of Child Education Psychology Europe, Dublin and Chevron Training and Recruitment
- Heriot-Watt University – Griffith College, Limerick
- University of Hull – Christian Leadership in Education Office, Cork, since 1993
- University of Hull – validated programmes at the Irish School of Ecumenics (1972–1982)
- Liverpool John Moores University – validated programmes for DBS
- London Metropolitan University – Portobello Institute
- Middlesex University – PCI College, Dublin
- University of Northumbria – Law Society of Ireland
- Nottingham Trent University – validated degrees for Griffith College
- University of Reading – Irish Management Institute
- University of Ulster – Irish Times Training and Marino Institute of Education
- University of Wales – validated degrees for Portobello College, The Priory Institute and Irish Bible Institute
- University of Wales Trinity Saint David – validates MBA programme at IBAT College, Dublin
- University of West London – British/Irish Modern Music Institute, Dublin
- University of the West of Scotland – Filmbase, Dublin
- University of Wolverhampton – Coláiste Dhúlaigh College of Further Education, Coolock and Edenmore
- York St John University – Irish Bible Institute since 2014
- York St John University – validated the Carmelite Institute of Britain and Ireland Masters programme from 2012 to 2016
- Pontifical University of Saint Thomas Aquinas – award degrees at the Dominican Studium, St. Saviour’s Priory, Dublin
- St John's College, Nottingham – has validated programmes with the Church of Ireland Theological Institute. St John's College closed in 2019.

== Defunct institutions ==
The following are defunct institutions, due to closure or merger. This list does not include institutions that were renamed.

- Albert Agricultural College (1838–1979), part of UCD from 1926 to 1979; NIHE Dublin (now DCU) was built on its grounds, incorporating some of its buildings
- All Hallows College (1842–2016), now part of Dublin City University
- Apothecaries' Hall, Dublin (1791–1971)
- Catholic University of Ireland (1854–1908), evolved into University College Dublin
- Church of Ireland College of Education (1816–2016), previously linked to University of Dublin, now part of DCU
- Cork Institute of Technology, merged with IT Tralee in 2021 to form Munster Technological University
- Froebel College of Education (1943–2013), now part of Maynooth University
- HSI College
- IT Tralee, merged with CIT in 2021 to form Munster Technological University
- Irish Academy for the Performing Arts (2002–2004)
- Kimmage Mission Institute (1991–2005) moved to Milltown and merged with Milltown Institute
- Mater Dei Institute of Education (1966–2016), now part of Dublin City University
- Media Lab Europe (2000–05)
- Mid West Business Institute, now part of Griffith College Limerick
- Milltown Institute of Theology and Philosophy (1968–2015)
- Newman College, Dublin, merged into Griffith College
- Our Lady of Mercy College, Carysfort (1877–1988)
- Portobello College Dublin, acquired by Dublin Business School in 2007
- Queen's University of Ireland (1850–82)
- Royal University of Ireland (1880–1909), succeeded by the National University of Ireland
- St Catherine's College of Education for Home Economics
- St Patrick's College of Education (1875–2016), now part of Dublin City University
- Tipperary Institute (1999–2011), now part of Limerick Institute of Technology
- Thomond College of Education, Limerick (1973–1991), became part of University of Limerick
- Tourism College Killybegs (1969–2001), now part of Letterkenny Institute of Technology
- University of Dublin (medieval) (operated intermittently 1320–1534)
- Limerick Institute of Technology, merged with AIT in 2021 to form the Technological University of the Shannon (TUS).
- Athlone Institute of Technology, merged with LIT in 2021 to form the Technological University of the Shannon (TUS).

== Professional Bodies ==
- Association of Chartered Certified Accountants – Accounting professional body
- Chartered Accountants Ireland – Accounting professional body
- Institution of Engineers of Ireland (Engineers Ireland) – Engineers professional body
- Law Society of Ireland – Solicitor professional body
- Royal Institute of the Architects of Ireland – the professional body for Architects in Ireland
- The Honorable Society of King's Inns – Barrister professional body

== Footnotes ==
- ^DU College is linked to University of Dublin.
- ^MTUCollege is linked to Munster Technological University
- ^NUI College is linked to National University of Ireland.
- ^UG College is linked to University of Galway.
- ^UCC College is linked to University College Cork.
- ^UL College is linked to University of Limerick.

== See also ==
- List of Ireland-related topics
  - Education in the Republic of Ireland
    - List of schools in the Republic of Ireland
    - Central Applications Office
    - HEAnet – Ireland's National Education & Research Network
    - Higher Education Authority
    - Higher Education and Training Awards Council
    - Further Education and Training Awards Council
    - ITnet – Institute of Technology Network
    - National Qualifications Authority of Ireland
    - Postgraduate Applications Centre
    - State Examinations Commission
- List of colleges and universities
  - List of universities in Northern Ireland
- Open access in the Republic of Ireland
