= Higher education accreditation =

Verification of university level qualifications

Higher education accreditation is a type of quality assurance and educational accreditation process under which services and operations of tertiary educational institutions or programs are evaluated to determine if applicable standards are met. If standards are met, accredited status is granted by the agency.

== Overview ==
In most countries around the world, the function of educational accreditation for higher education is conducted by a government organization, such as a ministry of education. In the United States, however, the quality assurance process is independent of government and performed by private agencies. Canada takes a unique position, not allowing any accreditation by government or private agencies, causing some Canadian institutions to seek accreditation by American agencies. Similar situation occurs in Singapore and Macau, which both countries do not have their own higher education accreditation organisation. Some institution from above countries seek accreditation from foreign agencies instead.

The Council for Higher Education Accreditation (CHEA), maintains an international directory which contains contact information of about 467 quality assurance bodies, accreditation bodies and ministries of education in 175 countries. The quality assurance and accreditation bodies have been authorized to operate by their respective governments either as agencies of the government or as private (non-governmental) organizations. In September 2012, University World News reported the launching on an international division of the council.

A criticism of higher education accreditation is the over-reliance on input factors, such as instructional time, adequate facilities and credentialed faculty, compared to learning outcomes.

== By country ==
=== Albania ===
In Albania, the accreditation authority/national recognition body is the ASCAL – Quality Assurance Agency in Higher Education (Albanian: Agjencia e Sigurimit të Cilësisë në Arsimin e Lartë) which was established by Order of CM no. 171, dated 27.09.2010, "On approval of structure of Public Accreditation Agency on Higher Education".

=== Australia ===
To award higher education qualifications in Australia, a provider must be registered with the Tertiary Education Quality and Standards Agency (TEQSA). Some providers, such as universities, can self-accredit their courses of study using their own academic governance structures and procedures. Most higher education providers must apply to have their courses accredited by TEQSA in order to award qualifications.

In many professional fields, practitioners must have studied a course accredited by the relevant professional body in order to be eligible for registration with that professional body. For example, registered nurses must have studied an eligible course in order to gain registration with the Australian Health Practitioner Regulation Agency in order to be eligible to practice. It is the responsibility of the higher education provider to obtain professional accreditation for such courses.

=== Bangladesh ===
The Bangladesh Accreditation Council is an autonomous government agency responsible to accredit higher education institutes and academic program offering entities for quality assurance leading to international recognition. Institution of Engineers, Bangladesh, Institute of Architects Bangladesh, Bangladesh Bar Council, Pharmacy Council of Bangladesh also accredit programs in Bangladesh.

=== Canada ===
Canada does not have a system of national or regional accreditation. Provincial legislation and membership in the Universities Canada are substitutes. Some universities seek evaluation from American regional accreditation agencies.

=== France ===
In France, the main accreditation authority is the Ministry of National Education.

- Accreditation by collation of academic degrees – the first-tier accreditation. Whereas institutions of higher education issues diplomas, only the ministry can award degrees. It is the main accreditation level and automatically awarded to public universities.
- Accreditation by visa – the second-tier accreditation. Only for private institutions.
- Accreditation by recognition – the third-tier accreditation. Only for private institutions.

In some education fields, the ministry must take official advice from special bodies. The ministry follows the body's advice in almost every case.

- Business Schools – the official consultation body is the Commission d'évaluation des formations et diplômes de gestion. There are two levels of accreditation.
  - Accreditation by collation of master's degree
  - Accreditation by visa
- Engineering Schools – the official consultation body is the Commission des Titres d'Ingénieur. It is an accreditation authority for private schools, but only an advising body for public schools.
  - Accreditation of Engineer's degrees
- Vocational education – the consultation body is the Commission Nationale de la Certification Professionnelle (National Commission for Vocational Certification).
  - Accreditation by inscription on the Répertoire national des certifications professionnelles (National Repertory of Vocational Certifications), which is a five-level listing.

The Conférence des Grandes écoles, which is a non-profit association, issues three types of accreditation:

- Accreditation of Mastère Spécialisé (Specialized Master or Advanced Master), only in grandes écoles
- Accreditation of Mastère en sciences (MSc), only in grandes écoles
- Accreditation of Bilan d'aptitude délivré par les grandes écoles (Assessment of competency issued by grandes écoles), only in grandes écoles

French schools, mainly Business Schools, may seek non-French accreditation.

- Association to Advance Collegiate Schools of Business (AACSB)
- Association of MBAs (AMBA)
- European Foundation for Management Development (EFMD)
  - EFMD Quality Improvement System (EQUIS), the more prestigious
  - EFMD Program Accreditation System (EPAS)

=== Germany ===
The Standing Conference of the Ministers of Education and Cultural Affairs of the Länder in the Federal Republic of Germany (Kultusministerkonferenz or KMK) was founded in 1948 by an agreement between the states of the Federal Republic of Germany. Among its core responsibilities, the KMK ensures quality development and continuity in tertiary education. Bachelor and Master programs must be accredited in accordance to a resolution of the Kultusministerkonerenz.

The German Council of Science and Humanities (Wissenschaftsrat) was founded on September 5, 1957, and conducts institutional accreditation of private and religious universities since 2001.

The Foundation for the Accreditation of Study Programs in Germany or Accreditation Council (Akkreditierungsrat) was created in a KMK resolution on October 15, 2004. The Accreditation Council certifies accreditation agencies and establishes guidelines and criteria for program and system accreditation. There are currently ten certified agencies.

- AHPGS – Accreditation Agency for Study Programs in Special Education, Care, Health Sciences and Social Work
- AKAST – Agency for Quality Assurance and Accreditation of Canonical Study Programs
- ACQUIN – Accreditation, Certification and Quality Assurance Institute
- AQAS – Agency for Quality Assurance by Accreditation of Study Programs
- AQ Austria – Agency for Quality Assurance and Accreditation Austria
- ASIIN – Accreditation Agency for Degree Programs in Engineering, Informatics/Computer Science, the Natural Sciences and Mathematics
- evalag – Evaluation Agency Baden-Württemberg
- FIBAA – Foundation for International Business Administration Accreditation
- OAQ – Swiss Center of Accreditation and Quality Assurance in Higher Education
- ZEvA – Central Evaluation- and Accreditation Agency

These agencies accredit programs of study for bachelor's and master's degrees and quality management systems (system accreditation) from state or state recognized Higher Education institutions in Germany and abroad. AKAST only accredit programs of study.

=== Greece ===
In Greece, the accreditation authority/national recognition body is the HQA – Hellenic Quality Assurance and Accreditation Agency which was established by Law 3374/2005 and 4009/2011 and belongs to the Ministry of Education, Research and Religious Affairs. It is the government supervisory and coordinating agency of the quality assurance framework applied in Hellenic Higher Education Institutions (HEIs). Accreditation is compulsory for all universities in Greece.

The HQA accredits programs of study for undergraduate degree and postgraduate degree and quality management systems (system accreditation) from state or state recognized HEIs in Greece. The right of conferring or granting university degrees shall be exercised only by a State University established. Thus, any institute which has not been created by an accreditation of Ministry of Education of Greece and HQA state agency according Greece State Legislature or has not been granted the status of a Deemed-to-be-University, is not entitled to award a university status degree. In Greece it is illegal to offer a qualification that is or might seem to be a university degree because all Higher Education Institutes (HEIs) in Greece are public (state) operating with government approval.

=== Hong Kong ===
The Hong Kong Council for Accreditation of Academic and Vocational Qualifications is appointed by the Secretary for Education of Education Bureau as the Accreditation Authority and QR Authority under the Qualifications Framework of Hong Kong (HKQF).

Assessment is made with reference to local and internationally recognized standards through a process of peer review. The HKCAAVQ issues an accreditation report on the outcome of the accreditation activity.

=== India ===
Accreditation is compulsory for all universities in India except those created through an act of Parliament. Without accreditation, "It is emphasized that these fake institutions have no legal entity to call themselves as University/Vishwvidyalaya and to award 'degrees' which are not treated as valid for academic/employment purposes." The University Grants Commission Act, 1956 explains,

"the right of conferring or granting degrees shall be exercised only by a University established or incorporated by or under a Central Act or a State Act or an Institution deemed to be University or an institution specially empowered by an Act of the Parliament to confer or grant degrees. Thus, any institution which has not been created by an enactment of Parliament or a State Legislature or has not been granted the status of a Deemed-to-be-University, is not entitled to award a degree."

Accreditation for higher learning is overseen by autonomous institutions established by the University Grants Commission.

Other accreditation are National Assessment and Accreditation Council and National Board of Accreditation.

=== Ireland ===
The later stages of Ireland's National Framework of Qualifications (NFQ) relate to third-level education in the state. Universities in Ireland are self-regulating and accredit their own courses; they were established by the state (by royal charter or primary legislation) as were many other publicly funded higher education providers, such as the institutes of technology (ITs). Some courses delivered by non-university institutions are accredited by one of the universities, others by Quality and Qualifications Ireland (QQI), an agency of the Department of Education established in 2012 to replace earlier accreditation bodies the Higher Education and Training Awards Council and Further Education and Training Awards Council (HETAC and FETAC). QQI delegates its power to some providers, including most ITs. The NFQ also recognises many foreign accreditation bodies, such as the UK's NCFE and City and Guilds of London Institute. Many further education colleges in Ireland offer courses accredited by UK universities. In 2010, when reviewing American College Dublin's accreditation, HETAC objected to its advertising its affiliation to the US-based "Irish American University" on the ground that the Universities Act 1997 restricts the use of the label "university".

=== Israel ===
The Council for Higher Education is, by a 1958 law, the only institution qualified to accredit universities and colleges in Israel. The council acts as a reviewer of the activity of the academic centers in Israel and sets terms and requirements for every degree given.

=== Italy ===
The formal system for accreditation of State University programs in Italy began in 1933, with the (R.D. 31.8.1933, n.1592, art. 167). This law accredits a set of Universities, faculties, and courses. A further modification was the Law 14 agosto 1982, n. 590, where a set of new Universities were accredited. A new system of accreditation was approved by Law 9 maggio 1989, n. 168. It involves two separate but correlated programs that were instituted at the same time: First, each University went through a four-step process to adopt and approve its own Regolamenti Didattici di Ateneo (RDA). The RDA establishes the rules for the organization of teaching at the university, including establishing the requirements and objectives of each degree program, the curricula, credits awarded and requirements and objectives of examinations. The RDA's were developed in consultation with representatives of the individual university, the regional coordinating committee (CRC), employers and the National University Council and are ultimately approved by the Ministry of Education (MIUR). Second, a series of formal, objective standards was adopted as minimum requirements for approval of any programs. In addition, there are other forms of accreditation in Italy. These include: (i) accreditation of degree programs in engineering by the Council of Presidents of the Italian Faculties of Engineering called SINAI, a national system for accrediting such programs; (ii) accreditation of MBA programs by the independent agency, Association for Business Management Training (ASFOR) and (iii) a program for accreditation of non-state university programs, which, since 1996, as involved a process of formal legal approval, involving an independent review by the National Committee for Evaluation of the University System (CNVSU) and then issuance of a formal ministerial decree approving by the issuance of degrees by the university.

=== Japan ===
In 2004, following a long postwar period of independent quality assurance of select member institutions by the JUAA, the Japanese government via the Ministry of Education, Culture, Sports, Science and Technology began to certify third party bodies as quality assurance agencies for Japanese degrees.

As of 2016, 13 organizations are certified to accredit tertiary institutions, of which three accredit standard academic universities. These three bodies are:

- ja: Japan University Accreditation Association (JUAA)
- NIAD-QE
- ja: Japan Institution for Higher Education Evaluation (JIHEE)

=== Kenya ===
The Commission for University Education (CUE), formerly known as the Commission for Higher Education (CHE), is in charge of the programs accreditation and the award of charters to institutions of higher learning. The commission also serves as the monitoring and evaluation body to ensure compliance towards quality of education offered by institutions under charter.

=== Malaysia ===
Accreditation was done by the Lembaga Akreditasi Negara (National Accreditation Board), a statutory body created through an act of Parliament, for certificates, diplomas and degree courses provided by private higher educational institutions (defined as institutions providing tertiary or post-secondary education) until 2007 when the body was replaced with the Malaysian Qualifications Agency (MQA).

Prior to the enactment of the legislations that provided for the establishment of these bodies, no specific framework for accreditation existed and institutions only required a valid registration status from the Ministry of Education of Malaysia.

=== Netherlands and Flanders (Belgium) ===
The Accreditation Organisation of the Netherlands and Flanders (NVAO) is a binational organization formed by treaty in 2003 to independently ensure the quality of higher education in the Netherlands and Flanders by assessing and accrediting programs. As a result of separate legislation in the two jurisdictions, accreditation policies and procedures differ between the two countries.

=== Nigeria ===
The National Universities Commission (NUC) is a parastatal under the Federal Ministry of Education (FME), Nigeria. The main functions of NUC are:

- Granting approval for all academic programs in Nigerian universities.
- Granting approval for the establishment of all higher educational institutions offering degree programs.
- Ensure quality assurance of all academic programs
- Channel for all external support to Nigerian universities.

=== Pakistan ===
The main accreditation body for higher education is Higher Education Commission (HEC) which is the primary regulator of higher education in Pakistan (formerly called the University Grant Commission (UGC)). It regulates and formulates laws governing all the degree awarding institutes in Pakistan. It also facilitates the development of higher educational system and upgrade the universities of Pakistan to be the centers of education, research and development.

=== Philippines ===
The Commission on Higher Education (Filipino: Komisyon sa Mas Mataas na Edukasyon/Komisyon sa Lalong Mataas na Edukasyon)[2] of the Philippines, abbreviated as CHED, is a government agency attached to the Office of the President of the Philippines for administrative purposes. It covers both public and private higher education institutions as well as degree-granting programs in all post-secondary educational institutions in the country.

Federation of Accrediting Agencies of the Philippines (FAAP), was established in 1977 and is authorized by the Philippine Commission on Higher Education (CHED) to certify the quality levels of accredited programs at the tertiary level, for the purpose of granting progressive deregulation and other benefits

=== Portugal ===
The Portuguese Agência de Acreditação (state-managed Accreditation Agency) for higher education is, since 2007, responsible for the publication of the national ranking of higher education institutions and degrees.

Within the Bologna process a state agency was set up by the Portuguese Government to offer central and regulated accreditation. Previously, Portugal had used a system of professional accreditation and degree recognition by sector, with a number of associations, Unions and Professional Orders (Ordens Profissionais): the Ordem dos Médicos (for medical doctors), the Ordem dos Engenheiros (for engineers) and the Portuguese Bar Association (for lawyers).

The Sindicato dos Engenheiros Técnicos (for technical engineers), was created as the professional association of technical engineers, who were not full chartered engineers, having as mandatory qualification a simple short-cycle 3-year bachelor's degree (bacharelato) awarded by the Portuguese polytechnical institutes and now discontinued since the mid-2000s.

The Associação de Técnicos de Contas (for accounting technicians), the Câmara de Revisores Oficiais de Contas (for financial auditors, similar to Chartered Accountants) and the Sindicato dos Enfermeiros (for nurses) are examples of organizations which were oriented towards professions that at least until the 1990s did not demand a specific academic degree. For example, to be member of the Câmara de Revisores Oficiais de Contas (for financial auditors), candidates needed to have two years of experience and must have a degree in a range of possible area (Economics, Finance, Business Administration, Accounting or Law). Like in other similar international associations (Chartered Accountant), the Câmara de Revisores Oficiais de Contas have very selective examinations.

Some organizations (starting as Associations or Unions) were upgraded later into Ordens like, for example, the Ordem dos Farmacêuticos (for pharmacists), the Ordem dos Arquitectos (for architects), the Ordem dos Biólogos (for biologists), the Ordem dos Economistas (for economists), the Ordem dos Enfermeiros (for nurses) and the Ordem dos Revisores Oficiais de Contas (for chartered accountants and financial auditors). In addition, the state through the ministry for higher education, has usually been the central highest accreditation entity and thus it is illegal to award degrees without government approval.

For many years, there were state-accredited institutions, both public and private, awarding unaccredited degrees by the Ordens. This dubious situation changed in the mid-2000s with the deep reorganization imposed by the Bologna process implementation in Portugal, the creation of the new central state-managed Accreditation Agency and the foundation of many regulated new Ordens covering dozens of professions until then unregulated by this type of professional organization.

In 1999, over 15,000 students enrolled in Portuguese higher learning institutions and newly graduates in the fields of engineering and architecture, were enrolled or were awarded a degree in a non-accredited course. Those students and graduates with no official recognition were not admitted to any Ordem and were unable to develop professional activity in their presumed field of expertise (e.g. architect; chemical, electrical or civil/structural engineer; lawyer; accountant; and financial auditor, among other professionals). At the same time, only one accredited engineering course was offered by a private university and over 90% of the accredited courses with recognition in the fields of engineering, architecture and law were exclusively provided by state-run universities.

In 2007, the compulsory closing of some problematic and unreliable private higher education institutions (like the defunct Independente University and the Moderna University) which in general had been accredited by the state during the boom of private teaching of the 1990s, but usually without providing any accredited degrees in accordance with the requirements of the main Ordens was seen as a remedy of last resort in order to prevent a further loss of credibility among some sectors within the non-public university higher education.

=== Russia ===
In Russia accreditation/national recognition is directly overseen by the Ministry of Education and Science of Russian Federation. Since 1981, Russia has followed the UNESCO international regulations to ensure Russian institutions and international institutions meet high quality standards. It is illegal for a school to operate without government approval.

The Russian Federation has a three-step recognition system:

1. License
2. Accreditation
3. Attestation

There exist additional agencies, such as the Agency for Higher Education Quality Assurance and Career Development (AKKORK), which conducts independent assessment of quality assurance of higher education institutions. AKKORK is an independent professional agency in the field of consultancy, conduct of the reviews, accreditation and certification of education institutions. In accordance with the Russian legislation in such activities as: state supervision over compliance with legislation of the Russian Federation on education, control over compliance with licensing requirements and conditions, state control over the education quality could be involved experts and expert organizations, accredited in accordance with rules approved by the Government of the Russian Federation. AKKORK on July 8, 2011, received the proper accreditation in the Federal Service for Supervision in Education and Science.

National Accreditation Agency (NAA) of the Ministry of Education and Science also operates under the authority of Federal Service of Supervision in Education and Science. NAA is recognized as the organisation in Russia responsible for dissemination of knowledge and information on procedures of the state accreditation of HEIs. It develops materials and methodological recommendations for conducting self-evaluations and external reviews, trains experts, conducts research into the development of QA of higher education in Russia, prepares the final reports on the quality of the HEI.

=== South Africa ===
In South Africa all higher education institutions are required to register with the Department of Higher Education and Training (DHET). All qualifications are registered by the South African Qualifications Authority (SAQA) in line with the National Qualifications Framework (NQF). The Higher Education Quality Committee (HEQC) of the Council on Higher Education (CHE) accredits programs leading to a NQF registered qualification. All programs offered by South African higher education institutions must be accredited.

=== Thailand ===
Thailand has a system of national accreditation. The agency who takes care of such accreditation is Office of the Higher Education Commission. The details regarding quality assurance can be found in Handbook for Internal Quality Assurance for Higher Education Institutions. She also has criteria for international qualification, especially those who have obtained degrees abroad. In addition, since Thailand is an active member of Association of Southeast Asian Nations (ASEAN), the educational collaboration is also strengthened in Southeast Asian states.

=== Ukraine ===
The national accreditation system for educational institutions is no longer used following the adoption of the Law of Ukraine "On Higher Education" in July 2014; however, relevant references to the term remain in a number of normative legal acts on education.

Previously, higher education institutions in Ukraine were accredited at four levels. The first level of accreditation allowed for the training of junior specialists and included technical schools and colleges offering basic higher education. The second level of accreditation provided the opportunity to train bachelor's degree students at universities, academies, and institutes. The third level of accreditation enabled the training of specialists and master's degree students and required a developed material and technical base, as well as qualified teaching staff. The fourth level of accreditation covered all types of educational programs, including the preparation of Doctors of Philosophy (PhD) and Doctors of Science, and was typical of universities and academies with active scientific activity and a high level of international cooperation.

=== United Kingdom ===
In the UK it is illegal to offer a qualification that is or might seem to be a UK degree unless the awarding body is a "recognised body" authorised by a royal charter or by or under an Act of Parliament to grant degrees, a "listed body" authorised by a recognised body to offer courses leading to a degree from that recognised body or the qualification is a "recognised award" designated by order of the Secretary of State. Prosecutions under the Education Reform Act are rare, as many unaccredited awarding bodies are based outside UK jurisdiction. It is also worth noting in this context that the Business Names Act 1985 made it an offence for any business in the UK to use the word "university" in its name without the formal approval of the Privy Council.

Private higher education (HE) and further education (FE) institutions (here distinguished from the qualifications that they offer) may choose to become accredited by various non-regulatory bodies such as the British Accreditation Council or the British Council and Accreditation Service for International Colleges in order to demonstrate third-party assessment of the quality of education they offer.

Prosecutions under legislation other than the Education Reform Act 1988 do occur. In 2004, Thames Valley College in London was prosecuted under the Trade Descriptions Act 1968 for offering degrees from the 'University of North America', a limited liability company set up by themselves in the US with no academic staff and no premises other than a mail forwarding service. (Note that this organization differs from the current University of North America, a non-accredited institution.)

=== United States ===
The US Department of Education and the Council for Higher Education Accreditation (CHEA) (a non-governmental organization) both recognize accrediting bodies for institutions of higher education, but US Department of Education recognition is necessary for access to financial aid and federally guaranteed student loans under Title IV. They also provide guidelines as well as resources and relevant data regarding these accreditors. Neither the US Department of Education nor the CHEA accredit individual institutions. However, the National Advisory Committee on Institutional Quality and Integrity is involved in certifying accrediting agencies, as it applies to the issue of higher education institutions' qualifications to disburse federal financial aid to their students and their students' ability to qualify for federal financial aid.

=== Zambia ===
The Higher Education Authority was established under the Higher Education Act No. 4 of 2013 to provide regulation and quality assurance of higher education institutions in Zambia.The authority is also mandated by law to register private higher education institutions.

== See also ==
- Academic bias
- Accreditation mill
- Conflict of interest
- Course credit
- Diploma mill
- Educational inflation
- Education reform
- List of recognized higher education accreditation organizations
- List of unrecognized higher education accreditation organizations
- Occupational licensing
- Professional certification
- Regulatory capture
- Unaccredited institutions of higher learning
- University reform
