= Coláiste na hÉireann =

Third-level Irish language-medium college in Dublin, Ireland

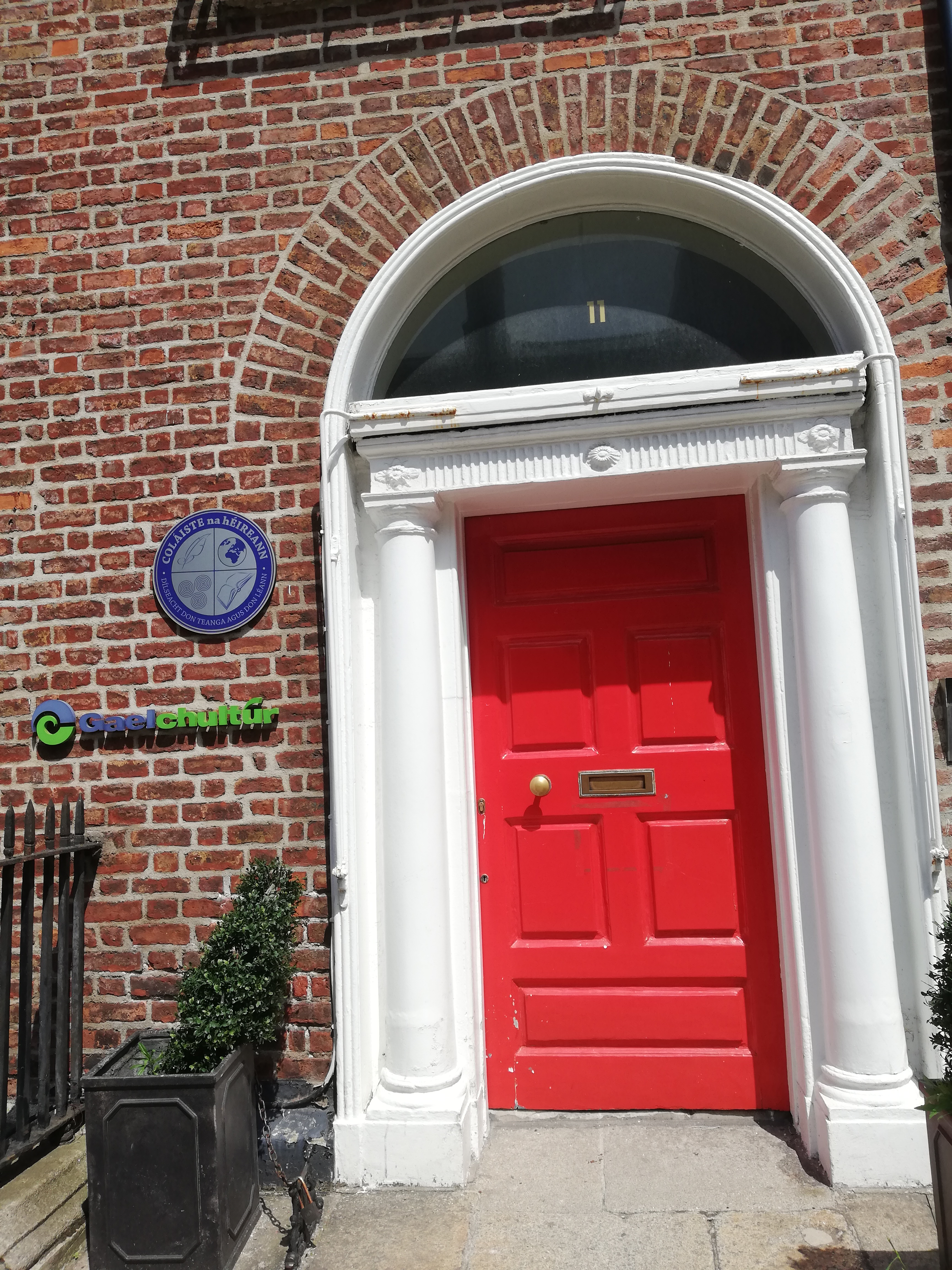
- Latin: Collegium Hiberniae
- Other names: Gaelchultúr
- Motto: Dílseacht don teanga agus don léann
- Motto in English: Fidelity to the language and to learning
- Established: 2013
- Director: Éamonn Ó Dónaill
- Location: 11 Clare Street, Dublin, D02 TD34, Ireland; 53.341484°N 6.251207°W
- Campus: urban
- Language: Irish
- Website: gaelchultur.com

Coláiste na hÉireann (Irish: [ˈkɔlˠaːʃtʲə nˠə ˈheːɾʲən̪ˠ]; English: "College of Ireland") is a third-level college in Dublin, Ireland offering qualifications in the study of translation and the Irish language.

== History ==
Gaelchultúr was founded in 2004 with the aim of promoting Irish culture and language in Ireland. It has published several textbooks and provided courses since then.

In 2013, the QQI/HETAC granted Gaelchultúr recognition as a third level institution with the ability to award recognised qualifications, thus giving birth to Coláiste na hÉireann. It occupies a unique position as the first independent third-level institution to operate through the medium of Irish, notwithstanding the foundation of Acadamh na hOllscolaíochta Gaeilge nine years previously, since the academy is considered a part of NUI Galway and therefore not independent.

The company Gaelchultúr did not cease to exist after the foundation of Coláiste na hÉireann. It continues to operate, however the two names seem to be synonymous.

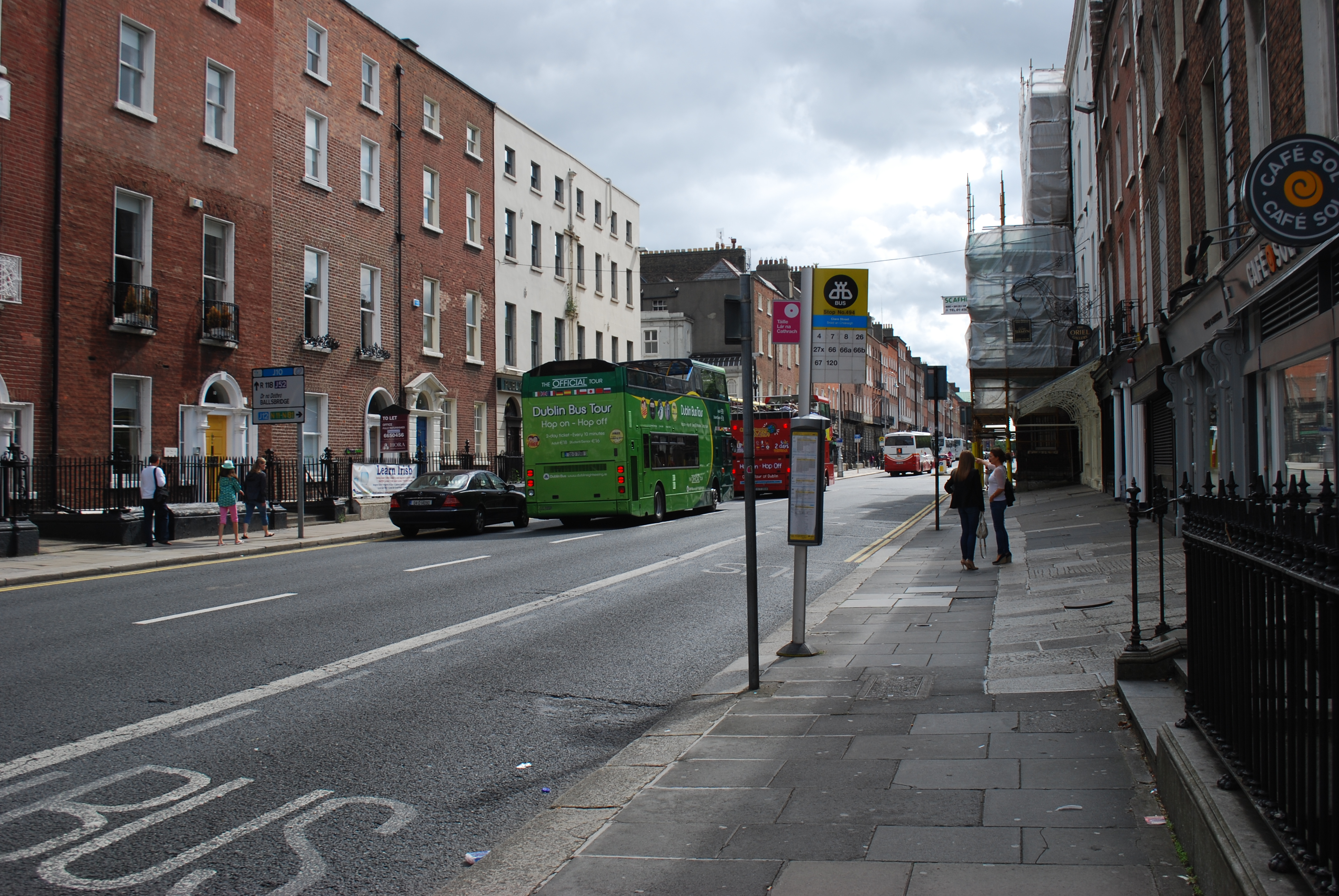
View of Clare Street, Dublin; Coláiste na hÉireann visible at left

== Courses ==
=== Postgraduate Diploma in Translation ===
The flagship course provided by Coláiste na hÉireann is its Postgraduate Diploma in Translation (Dioplóma Iarchéime san Aistriúchán; NFQ Level 9). This is conducted over three semesters via mixed learning. As the face-to-face portions are limited to one Saturday per month, this programme does not exclude students who are also working full-time.

The subject matter deals with translation theory, precision and richness of language, and translation practice. Topics in legal translation and translation technology are also taught.

=== Certificate in Professional Irish ===
Gaelchultúr offers courses leading to a Component Certificate in Professional Irish (Teastas sa Ghaeilge Ghairmiúil). These are available at differing language levels, from relative beginner to advanced. The category of the qualification varies from NFQ Level 3-6, depending on the language level.

These certificates are aimed primarily at filling the substantial gap between many public sector bodies have between their statutory obligations with regard to provision of services in Irish, and their actual capabilities.

== Collaboration ==
=== MA in Applied Irish ===
Beginning in 2008, Gaelchultúr collaborated with DIT's School of Languages, Laws and Social Sciences to run an MA in Applied Irish (MA sa Ghaeilge Fheidhmeach). The course was delivered for several years.

== See also ==
- Acadamh na hOllscolaíochta Gaeilge
- Sabhal Mòr Ostaig
- Education in the Republic of Ireland
- List of universities in the Republic of Ireland
