= Teachers' Union of Ireland =

Secondary and tertiary teachers' union in Ireland

- Aontas Múinteoirí Éireann
- Founded: 1930
- Headquarters: Dublin, Ireland
- Location: Ireland
- Members: 19,000
- Key people: Michael Gillespie (General Secretary), Liz Farrell (President)
- Affiliations: ICTU
- Website: tui.ie

Teachers' Union of Ireland (TUI; Irish: Aontas Múinteoirí Éireann) is a trade union in Ireland representing teachers and lecturers in post-primary schools, adult education colleges, institutes of technology, and technological universities. The TUI is affiliated with the Irish Congress of Trade Unions (ICTU) and is represented on various education governmental bodies such as the National Council for Curriculum and Assessment (NCCA), the Further Education and Training Awards Council (FETAC), the Higher Education and Training Awards Council (HETAC), and the Vocational Education Committees. The Association of Secondary Teachers, Ireland (ASTI) is the other trade union representing post-primary teachers in Ireland.

== History ==
The union was founded in 1930 as the Vocational Educational Officers' Organisation, and it joined the Irish Trades Union Congress the following year. In 1955, it renamed itself as the Vocational Teachers' Association, and then in 1973 it became the "Teachers' Union of Ireland".

== General Secretaries ==
1930: Frank McNamara
1952: Billy McNamara
1955: Tom Donaghy
1956: Charles McCarthy
1972: Maurice Holly
1975: Kevin McCarthy
1976: Christy Devine
1982: Jim Dorney
2008: Peter MacMenamin
2011: John MacGabhann
2020: Michael Gillespie

== See also ==
- Irish Primary Principals Network
