= American College Dublin =

Constituent college of Irish American University

- An Coláiste Meiriceánach, Baile Átha Cliath
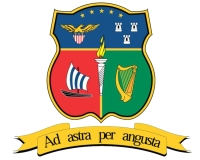
- Other name: American College
- Motto: Ad astra per angusta
- Motto in English: Through difficulties to greatness
- Type: Private (non-profit)
- Established: 1993
- Accreditation: Middle States Commission on Higher Education
- Affiliations: HETAC, MSCHE
- President: Joseph A. Rooney
- Vice-president: Rory McEntegart
- Location: 1 Merrion Square North, Dublin, Ireland; 53°20′28″N 6°15′02″W
- Language: English
- Website: iamu.edu
- Location within Central Dublin

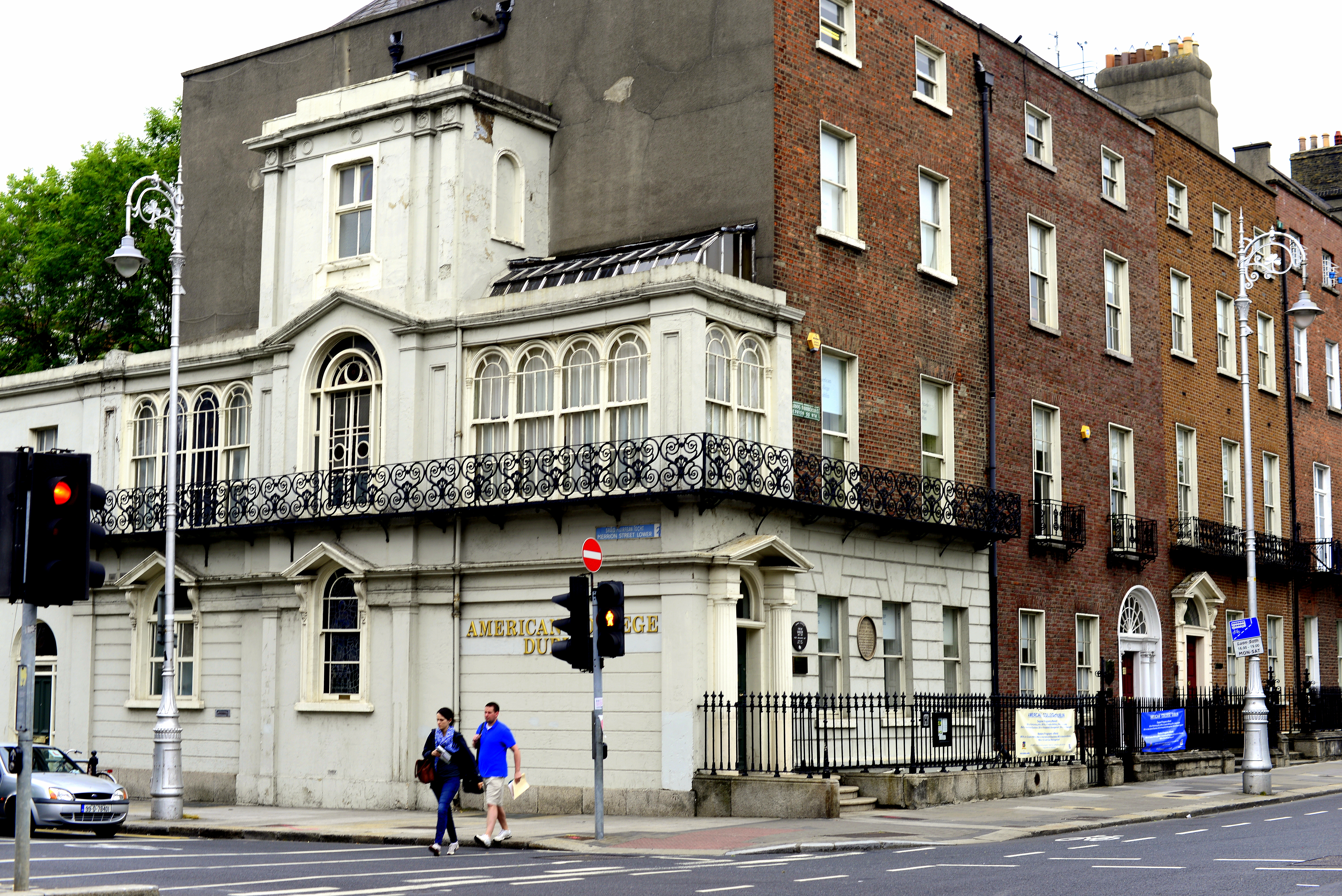
1 Merrion Square, the American College Dublin. This was the childhood home of Oscar Wilde. Dublin 2, Ireland

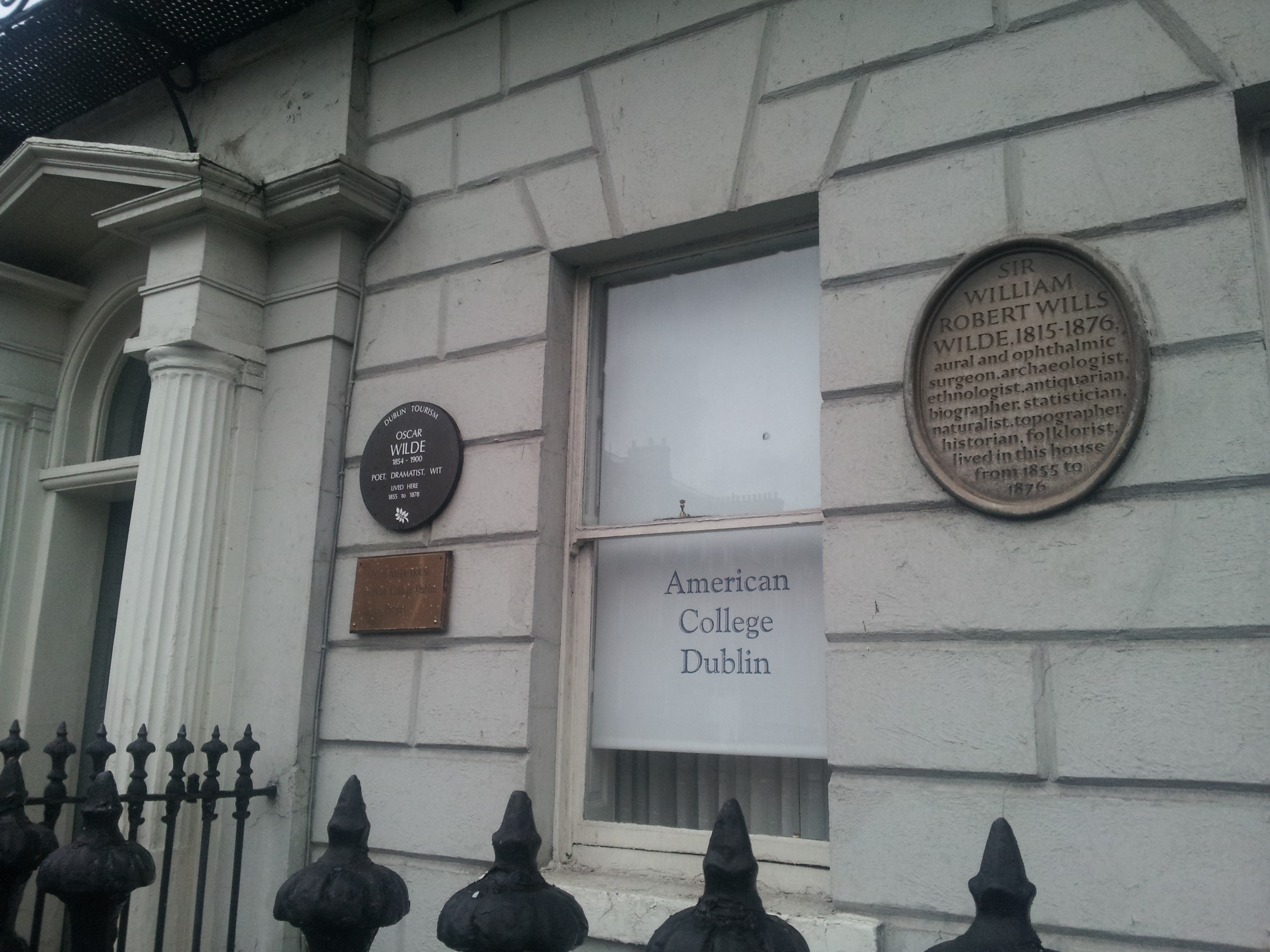
Facing Merrion Square

American College Dublin, a constituent college of Irish American University, is a private not-for-profit liberal arts institution accredited by the Middle States Commission on Higher Education (MSCHE). Established in 1993 in Dublin Ireland, the institution is located in the center of Dublin on Merrion Square in a number of Georgian era houses, one of which is the childhood home of Oscar Wilde. In addition to its American accreditation with MSCHE, American College Dublin offers programs placed at level-eight and level-nine on the Irish National Framework of Qualifications which are accredited by the Irish body Quality and Qualifications Ireland (QQI) and for which graduating students receive QQI awards.

American College Dublin was founded as an independent educational trust in May 1993 by Lynn University, a liberal arts institution located in Boca Raton, Florida. The college admitted its first liberal arts and business degree students in September 1993 and graduated its first class in 1996. The development of the college's Dublin campus continued through the 1990s; in 2002, the institution expanded its operations with the establishment of a sister campus in Delaware, which became known as American College Delaware. After moving from Claymont to Lewes in 2013, the Delaware campus was closed in 2019.

== Location ==
The college's corner building at 1 Merrion Square was the childhood home of Oscar Wilde who spent his formative years there from 1855 to 1878. His father William Wilde lived at the house from 1855 until his death in 1876.

== Degrees and courses ==
The college offers a number of undergraduate and graduate courses validated by QQI.

There are also a number of courses validated through the Middle States Commission on Higher Education.

The following bachelor's degree programs are offered by the school:

- Bachelor of Fine Arts in Musical Theatre
- Bachelor of Fine Arts in Performing Arts
- Bachelor of Fine Arts in Creative Writing
- Bachelor of Arts (Hons) in Liberal Arts
- BA (Hons) in International Business
- BA in International Business
- Bachelor of Arts in Event Management
- Bachelor of Arts in Hospitality Management

Offered Graduate programs include:

- Master of Fine Arts in Performance
- Master of Fine Arts in Music for Motion Pictures and Contemporary Media
- Master of Fine Arts in Fashion Design
- Master of Fine Arts in Creative Writing
- Master of Fine Arts in Creative Writing Practice
- MBA in Oil and Gas Management
- Masters in Business Administration
- Master of Business in International Business

An Associate of Fine Arts in Musical Theatre is also offered.

The college also offers a Study Abroad program to students from the United States. Students can study at ACD during the fall and spring semesters (15 weeks) as well as in an eight-week summer semester. American College Dublin has two undergraduate programs for which graduating students receive QQI awards:

- BA (Hons) in Liberal Arts
- BA (Hons) in International Business

American College Dublin has one graduate program for which graduating students receive a QQI award:

- MB in International Business.

== Accreditation ==
American College Dublin has been accredited by the Philadelphia-based Middle States Commission on Higher Education since 2013. The college has also been an accredited institution of the Irish state accreditation agencies since 1996 (NCEA from 1996 to 1999, HETAC from 1999 to 2014, QQI from 2014 to the present). The college was the subject of a critical report by the Higher Education and Training Awards Council (HETAC, now absorbed into QQI), which highlighted a series of institutional failures at the American College and made no less than 37 recommendations for change. The college was reprimanded for calling itself the "Irish American University" when it had no status as a university. However, the college did submit an institutional review to HETAC in June 2011, in which they outlined a number of steps they had taken to improve quality.

The college underwent in 2010 an institutional review as part of the cyclical accreditation process of the Higher Education and Training Awards Council (HETAC, now absorbed into QQI). Several recommendations were made; these were addressed and accepted fully by HETAC in follow-up reports in the course of 2011 and the college's institutional recognition by the body remains in place. All of the college's HETAC programs were reaccredited under programmatic review in 2011 and, by QQI, in the following quinquennial review cycle in 2016. The college received full accreditation from the Middle States Commission on Higher Education in 2013.

== Program changes ==
In 2010, the Psychological Society of Ireland (PSI) limited the term of its validation of the college's psychology program to one year, in the course of which it required new validation criteria to be met. Given the uncertainty about the future of the program's PSI validation, the college arranged for students who wished to complete the degree under PSI validation to transfer to a similar program at Dublin Business School. All of the affected students elected to transfer out of the program.

== Rankings ==
American College Dublin was listed as one of the top-five best places to study abroad by Buzzfeed in 2014.
