= National Diploma (Ireland) =

Irish technology discipline qualification

The National Diploma (NDip) (Irish: Dioplóma Náisiúnta) was a three-year ab initio specialised higher education qualification, often in a technology discipline, offered by an Institute of Technology or other HETAC-designated institution in Ireland.

== Overview ==
Alternatively, a National Diploma could be offered as a one-year post National Certificate type course. The diploma generally exempted a student from the first two or three years of a four-year university honours bachelor's degree in Ireland.

Northern Ireland universities considered the standard equivalent to the BTEC Higher National Diploma, this was also the position adopted by most British universities that have large entrance from the Republic. Many of the courses were in business, engineering and science. Most entrants were school leavers presenting the Leaving Certificate or the National Certificate and many continued their studies to honours Bachelor's degree level.

== History ==
The National Diploma in Ireland was first awarded in 1973 by several Regional Technical Colleges. The National Diploma has been replaced by the Ordinary Bachelor's Degree under the National Framework of Qualifications. This was decided by the National Qualifications Authority of Ireland recently. The National Diploma has not been awarded since June 2006.

== See also ==
- Education in the Republic of Ireland
- National Framework of Qualifications
