= St. Nicholas Montessori College, Ireland =

Training institution in Ireland (established 1978)

Coordinates: 53.29511°N 6.14424°W

St. Nicholas Montessori College, Ireland delivers courses in Montessori education. The director of the college is Ian McKenna.

== History ==
Founded in 1978 by St. Nicholas Montessori Society of Ireland, in 1980 it purchased St. Nicholas House in Dun Laoghaire, and in 1984 the college started running training courses in Montessori education, initially a diploma awarded by the London Montessori Training Centre. In 1994 the college became accredited by National Council for Educational Awards (NCEA) and developed degree courses in Montessori education.

== Courses ==
The college offers an undergraduate Level 7 Bachelor of Arts and a Level 8 BA (Hons) in Montessori Education, as well as a higher diploma. The qualifications are validated by Quality and Qualifications Ireland (QQI). The college runs courses full-time and part-time, and from its Dublin and Cork locations.

The full-time degrees and higher diplomas can be applied to via the Irish Government's Central Applications Office system, and the Higher Education Grants scheme (SUSI) is available to students.
