= Acadamh na hOllscolaíochta Gaeilge =

Third-level educational institution, Galway, Ireland

Coordinates: 53.264116°N 9.598982°W

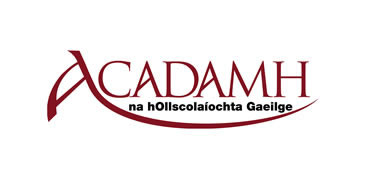
- Motto: Ollscolaíocht Ghaeilge ag cur pobal teanga agus léinn chun cinn
- Established: 2004
- Parent institution: University of Galway
- Director: Dónall Ó Braonáin
- Academic staff: 36
- Administrative staff: 24
- Location: Ireland
- Campus: Multiple sites
- Language: Irish
- Website: www.acadamh.ie

Acadamh na hOllscolaíochta Gaeilge (Irish: [ˈakəd̪ˠəw n̪ˠə ˈhʊl̪ˠˌsˠkʊlˠiːxt̪ˠə ˈɡeːlʲɟə]; English: "The Academy of Irish-Language University Education") is a third level educational and research institution headquartered in Galway, Ireland. It was established as part of the National University of Ireland - Galway in 2004, to further the development Irish-medium education. The academy works in co-operation with faculties, departments and other university offices to develop the range and number of programmes that are provided through the medium of Irish on campus and in the academy's Gaeltacht centres.

== Locations ==
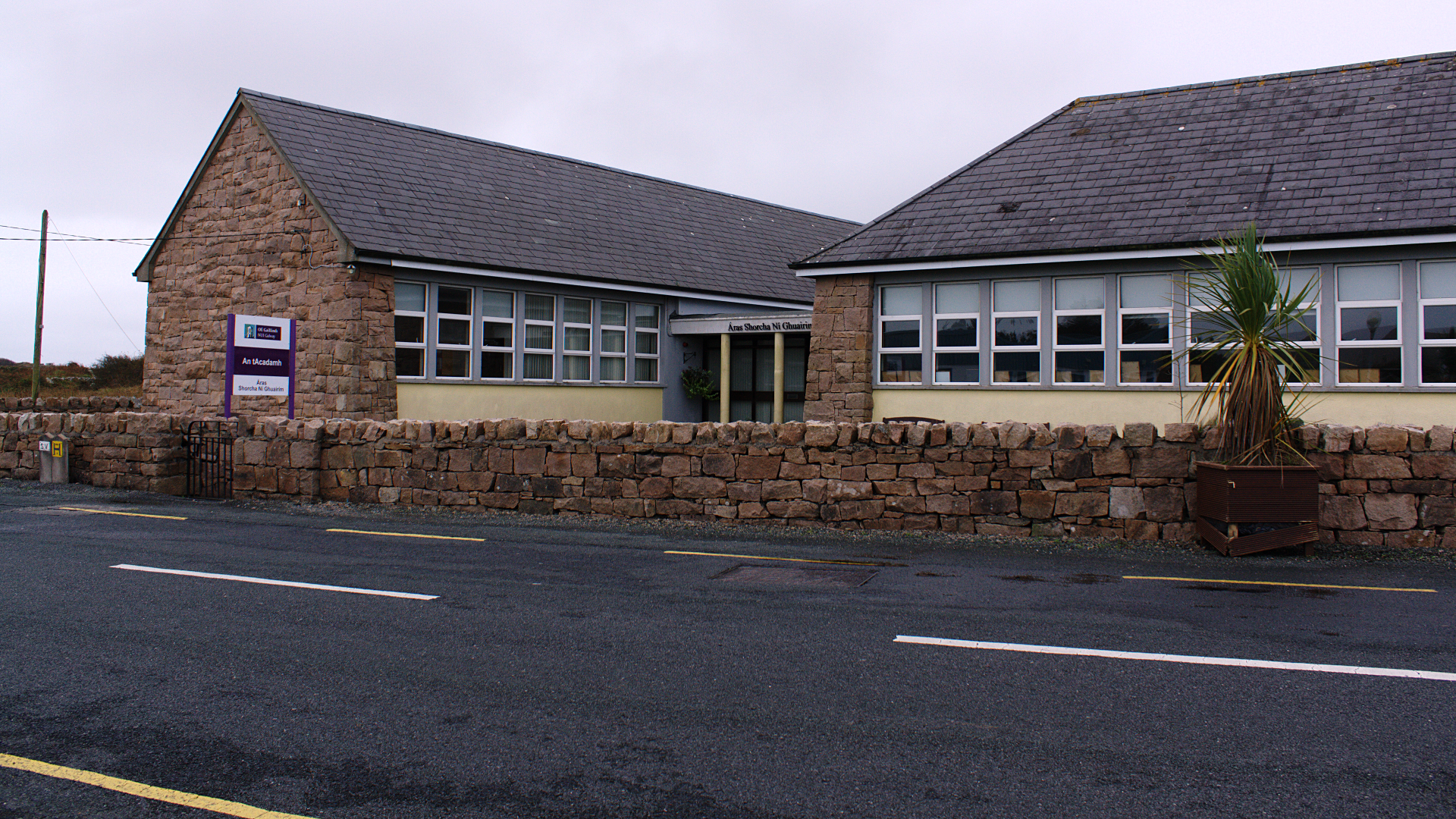
Áras Shorcha Ní Ghuairim in Carna

The academy operates in four in urban and rural campuses or centres:

- Áras na Gaeilge on the University of Galway's main campus in Galway city
- Áras Mháirtín Uí Chadhain in the Ceathrú Rua in Connemara, Galway
- Ionad an Acadaimh in the Doirí Beaga in Gaoth Dobhair, Donegal
- Áras Shorcha Ní Ghuairim in Carna in Connemara, Galway

== History ==
The importance to any linguistic group of higher education through their own language has long been acknowledged. The foundation in Scotland of the Sabhal Mòr Ostaig, an institute which is comparable to but more substantial than the academy as it is a constituent college of the University of the Highlands and Islands, has been accompanied by a marked increase in the vitality of Scottish Gaelic. While higher education has a long history in Ireland, for most of that history it has been almost exclusively been a pursuit for English-speakers. Many Irish third level institutions provide courses where Irish itself is the object of study, but outside of that it very rare for Irish to be the medium through which a student can achieve the prestige which goes along with the title "graduate" (a notable exception being Fiontar in Dublin City University).

The academy was founded in 2004 under the auspices of the National University of Ireland - Galway to provide a centre of excellence for university studies and research through the Irish language. It was the only third level body where the working language and language of instruction are Ireland's indigenous language until in 2013 when the educational organisation Gaelchultúr was granted its status as a third level institution by the QQI, giving birth to Coláiste na hÉireann.

The academy is a small body and is subordinate status to its parent the University of Galway, it is considered an Irish language campus of the University.

== Research and service provision ==
The academy's staff have been involved in the creation of The New Irish-English Dictionary, the Digital Repository of Ireland and other archival projects, providing material and data insights to the national Irish-language broadcaster TG4, and conducting examinations for the national Seal of Accreditation for translators.

It maintains a close relationship with departments of the university in Galway. Given its concentration of Irish language education and research skills, the academy provides services for other bodies such as translation services, language education for NUIG staff, and developing the university's Language Scheme.

It publishes papers on topics including sociolinguistics, technology, pedagogy and translation in its annual scholarly publication, An Reiviú.

== Academic ==
The academy offers university courses of various levels in numerous subjects, primarily in language studies, communication and technology, and indigenous culture. Many courses can be taken full-time or part-time, and some even cater for distance learning. Prospective students can apply directly or through the Central Applications Office, as appropriate. Below is a sample of the programmes which have been delivered.

=== Undergraduate Programmes ===
- BA in Communication Studies and Irish
- BA in Irish and Translation Studies
- BA in Applied Irish
- BComm with Irish

Both Translation Studies and Communication Studies can be taken as part of a joint honours degree.

=== Postgraduate programmes ===
- MA/Postgraduate Diploma in Conference Interpreting
- Higher Diploma in Applied Irish
- MA/Postgraduate Diploma in Professional Practice in the Media
- MA/Postgraduate Diploma in Language Studies
- Postgraduate Certificate in Translation Studies
- Postgraduate Certificate in Advanced Irish Skills for Teachers

=== Other programmes ===
- Diploma in Web Development
- Diploma in Indigenous Culture
- Diploma in Arts (Film and Multimedia)
- Diploma in Arts (Translation Studies)
- Diploma in Language Planning and Preservation

== Publications ==
Comprehensive Linguistic Study of the Use of Irish in the Gaeltacht: Principal Findings and Recommendations, Dublin: Acadamh na hOllscolaíochta Gaeilge (National University of Ireland Galway)

Members of the academy produce regular contributions to the interdisciplinary online journal, An Reiviú.

== See also ==
- Foras na Gaeilge
