= Portobello Institute =

- Former names: Portobello School
- Type: private
- Established: 1981
- Location: Dublin, Ireland
- Campus: Urban
- Affiliations: FETAC(since 2005); HETAC(since 2009); London Metropolitan University(since 2014)
- Website: portobelloinstitute.com

Portobello Institute is a private third level college delivering further and higher education specialising in Early Years, Sport, Facilities Management, Travel and Tourism and Business of Fashion.

It has a variety of programmes validated by a number of bodies including QQI, IWFM, London Metropolitan University and Liverpool John Moores University. Many of its courses are aimed at Higher Education such and BSc, MSc, BA and MA. They also offer professional training courses.

Commencing in 2014 Portobellos degree-level programmes in early childhood studies, sports and sports therapy have been validated by London Metropolitan University.

Founded in 1981 as Portobello School, in South Richmond Street, Dublin, specialising in beauty, health and care courses.

It is now located in Dominick St., Dublin, and many of its courses are available via blended learning. A graduation ceremony takes place each year; in the past few years it has taken place in Croke Park.
