= National Certificate =

Technological third level qualification in several countries

The National Certificate is a higher education qualification in a technology discipline offered by higher institutions across the globe. Each country has its own specifications about the certificate.

== Ireland ==
The National Certificate (Irish: Teastais Náisiúnta) was a two-year broadly based higher education qualification in a technology discipline offered by an Institute of Technology or a HETAC-designated institution in Ireland. The certificate generally exempts a student from the first year of a four-year university Bachelor's degree or the first two years of an ab initio National Diploma in Ireland. The certificates are often in business, engineering and science, with most entrants being school leavers and presenting a Leaving Certificate or similar educational achievement. Many students continue education and transfer to a National Diploma course or a Bachelor's degree.

The first National Certificates in Ireland were awarded in 1972 at five Regional Technical Colleges. Since June 2006 and the implementation of the National Framework of Qualifications, the National Certificate has been replaced by the Higher Certificate in a number of similar disciplines.

== United Kingdom ==
=== England, Wales and Northern Ireland ===
In the educational systems of England and Wales and Northern Ireland, the National Certificate is a standard vocational further education qualification. It is usually rated at Level 3 on the National Qualifications Framework and is equivalent to A-level, BTEC Extended Diploma or NVQ Level 3 standard.

=== Scotland ===
National Certificate courses in Scotland are a one-year course offered by Technical Colleges. They are typically used to progress on to a Higher National Certificate or similar degree course, although a National Certificate is still a recognised qualification on its own.

== Mauritius ==
In Mauritius, the National Certificate is a vocational qualification, with a level mapped to the National Qualifications Framework (NQF).

== See also ==
- Education in the Republic of Ireland
- Education in Scotland
