= Irish Universities Quality Board =

The Irish Universities Quality Board (IUQB) was established in 2002.

The purpose of the board, which operated from 2002 to 2012, was to promote quality assurance at Irish universities including via institutional quality reviews, whilst the board is not specifically created by an Act of the Oireachtas it does undertake the functions of the Universities Act 1997 (Section 35) in doing its work.

The functions of the board were passed to Quality and Qualifications Ireland on 6 November 2012.
