= University of Dublin =

University in Dublin, Ireland, founded 1592

- Ollscoil Átha Cliath
- Coat of Arms Flag
- Latin: Universitas Dublinensis
- Type: Research university Ancient University
- Established: 1592; 434 years ago
- Affiliations: Coimbra Group; EUA; IUA; UI; LERU; AMBA; CLUSTER
- Endowment: €302.9 million (2024)
- Budget: €665.2 million (2023/24)
- Chancellor: Mary McAleese
- Academic staff: 777 (2014)
- Administrative staff: 2,097 (incl. 606 research staff; 2014)
- Students: 16,729 (2014)
- Undergraduates: 12,420 (2014)
- Postgraduates: 4,309 (2014)
- Location: Dublin, Ireland; 53°20′40″N 06°15′28″W
- Campus: Urban 46.8 hectares (116 acres) (incl. satellite sites)
- Language: English
- Colours: Trinity Pink
- Website: www.tcd.ie

The University of Dublin (Irish: Ollscoil Átha Cliath), corporately named as The Chancellor, Doctors and Masters of the University of Dublin, is a public research university located in Dublin, Ireland. It was founded in 1592 by Queen Elizabeth I who issued a royal charter for Trinity College Dublin in her role as "the mother of a university", making it Ireland's oldest operating university. It is also one of the extant seven ancient universities of Great Britain and Ireland (Note: An earlier attempt to set up a university at Dublin in 1320, under an "ordance" issued by Alexander de Bicknor, archbishop of Dublin, authorizing four masters, proved abortive when Bicknor was disgraced as a partisan of Mortimer) and is the degree-awarding body for Trinity College, which is its sole constituent college. Originally established to consolidate the rule of the Tudor dynasty in Ireland, the University of Dublin has historic ties with the universities of both Oxford and Cambridge, and has maintained an academic partnership with them since 1636.

As only one constituent college was ever established, the designations "Trinity College Dublin" and "University of Dublin" are usually synonymous in practice. It is a member of the Irish Universities Association (IUA), Universities Ireland, the League of European Research Universities (LERU), and the Coimbra Group. The university is headed by the Provost, under the supervision of a Chancellor and six Pro-Chancellors.

== History ==
The University of Dublin was modelled on the University of Oxford and the University of Cambridge as a collegiate university, Trinity College being named by Queen Elizabeth I as the mater universitatis ("mother of the university"). The founding charter also conferred a general power on the college to make provision for university functions to be carried out. So, for example, the charter while naming the first provost of the college, the first fellows ("in place of many') and the first scholars, in addition named the 1st Baron Burghley to be the first chancellor of the university. No other college has ever been established, and Trinity remains the sole constituent college of the university. The project of establishing another college within the university was seriously considered on at least two occasions, but the required finance or endowment was never available.

The most recent authoritative statement of the position is in the Universities Act 1997. The section relating to interpretation specifies:

"3.—(1) In this Act, unless the context otherwise requires—

'Trinity College' means the College of the Holy and Undivided Trinity of Queen Elizabeth near Dublin established by charter dated the 3rd day of March, 1592, and shall be held to include the University of Dublin save where the context otherwise requires in accordance with the charters and letters patent relating to Trinity College;

...

'the University of Dublin' means the university established by the charters and letters patent incorporating Trinity College and which said university is further provided for by the letters patent of the 24th day of July 1857;"

Queen Victoria issued the letters patent in 1857 giving formal legal foundation to the senate, and other authorities specific to the university. Subsequently, in a remarkable High Court case of 1898, the provost, fellows and scholars of Trinity were the claimants and the chancellor, doctors and masters of the University of Dublin were among the defendants, and the court held that Trinity College and the University of Dublin "are one body". The judge noted pointedly (referring to the then recent founding of University College Dublin) that "[t]he advisers of Queen Victoria knew how to incorporate a University when they meant to do so" and that the letters patent dealt with "not the incorporation of the University of Dublin but of its Senate merely".

Notwithstanding, the statutes of the university and the college grant the university separate corporate legal rights to own property, borrow money, employ staff, and also enable it to sue and be sued as occurred in the case referred to above. To date the other rights have not been exercised. Current officers of the university are either unpaid and purely honorary (chancellor, pro-chancellor), or have duties relating to the college also, for which they are paid, but by the college (the proctors, the registrar, the mace bearer).

Some of the legal definitions and differences between college and university were discussed in the reform of the university and college in the Charters and Letters Patent Amendment Bill, which later became law, but many of the college contributions to this were unclear or not comprehensive, possibly because it concerned an internal dispute within college as to outside interference and also as misconduct by college authorities in overseeing voting, which led to a visitor's enquiry which in turn found problems with the voting procedures and ordered a repeat ballot. Further contributions on the relationship between college and university can be found in submissions to the Oireachtas on reform of Seanad Éireann, the upper house of the Irish Oireachtas, since the university elects members to that body), and in particular the verbal submission of the provost.

Traditionally, sport clubs also use the name "Dublin University", rather than "Trinity College".

The coat of arms bearing the seal was officially assigned to the University Senate on 28 March 1862. The original seal contained the Latin text Senatus Universitatis Dubliniensis.

== Organisation ==
The university is governed by the university senate, chaired by the chancellor or their pro-chancellor. While the Senate was formally constituted by the Letters Patent of 1857 as a body corporate under the name, style, and title of "The Chancellor, Doctors, and Masters of the University of Dublin", it had existed since soon after the foundation of Trinity College being brought into being by the enabling powers contained in the founding Charter. Consequently, the Letters Patent had the effect of converting a preexisting non-incorporated body relying on custom, practice and precedent to establish its authority into a corporate body clearly, and explicitly established in law. The Letters Patent empowered the university senate by stating:

"It shall be and shall continue to be a body corporate with a common seal, and shall have power under the said seal to do all such acts as may be lawful for it to do in conformity with the laws and statutes of the State and with the Charters and Statutes of the College."

The Letters Patent also defined the composition of the Senate:

"It shall consist of the Chancellor, the Pro-Chancellors, and such Doctors and Masters of the University as shall be members of the Senate in accordance with such regulations and conditions as the Board shall enact." Consequently, the Senate does not determine its own composition. As the "board" is the governing authority of Trinity College, and moreover no business may be put before the Senate save on the proposal of the board, it would seem the university has some degree of subsidiarity to the board of the college. However this is countered by the role of the visitors.

Each meeting of the Senate is headed by a "caput", consisting of the chancellor, the provost of Trinity College and the senior master non-regent. The practical significance of the caput is that no meeting of the Senate may be convened without it, and each member of the caput has an individual veto on all decisions of the Senate. In attendance also are, usually, the registrar (who is responsible for legal and administrative matters) and the junior and senior proctors (who present undergraduate and postgraduate candidates for degree commencement ceremonies). There is also a mace holder, the chief steward (responsible for college security) or his deputy, who proceeds the caput in a procession. (Attendees stand while the procession progresses to the head of the room). Meetings of the Senate are of two kinds. Meetings to confer degrees, which, according to ancient usage, are known in the university as "public commencements" and are the most numerous, and business meetings (usually one a year), which are concerned with university business other than degree conferring.

In each academic year, the Senate holds not less than four stated meetings for the conferring of degrees; of these meetings, two are held in Michaelmas Term, and two in Trinity Term. The proceedings of these meetings, conducted in a highly formal and scripted manner, are carried out in Latin. The meeting is held in public and can be attended by persons who are not members of the Senate, mostly relatives of people about to receive degrees, although, of course, only members of the Senate, wearing the correct academic dress participate in the formal business, and actually vote, save that general applause is encouraged when relevant. Although voting takes place at these meetings, discussion does not. Voting takes place to elect a senior master non regent, or on whether degrees should be conferred on named candidates. As the lists of persons to receive degrees are voted on en bloc, and as the lists require the prior approval of the board, which itself receives the names of candidates as agreed by boards of examiners, it can be seen that the vote is purely formal, as it is difficult to see any practical circumstances in which it would be legitimate for a member of the Senate to attend a commencements and register an objection. Honorary degrees, while being conferred at a commencements are not even formally voted on there. Voting on a candidate for an honorary degree takes place earlier, at the previous business meeting of the Senate, so if any objection to a proposed honorary degree award is to be made, it must be made then. It follows that there is no opportunity at the public commencements to object to an honorary degree.

At the first public commencements of the academic year the senior master non-regent is elected on the proposition of the chancellor and the provost. The Senate votes on the name put forward by a voice vote, in Latin. The senior master non regent is elected for a one-year term, but may be re elected. (A Master of Arts is considered a regent during the three years following the conferral of that degree; subsequently, they are designated as a non-regent. One individual elected by the Senate from among the masters non-regent is, according to ancient usage and statute, designated as the "Senior Master Non-Regent.") The senior and junior proctors and the registrar also make the declaration which is appropriate to their respective offices at that meeting. These officers, although officers of the university, are appointed by the board of the college, one of a number of examples of the line being blurred between university and college, due to history of the arrangement. In the same way, the senior master non-regent, although they could be any non-regent master of the university, is usually the most senior fellow of the college, who does not otherwise hold any college office. Further the provost, while primarily the head of the college, holds a university office as one of the three caput members. As this gives the provost a veto on all university business, this underlines the significance of that office.

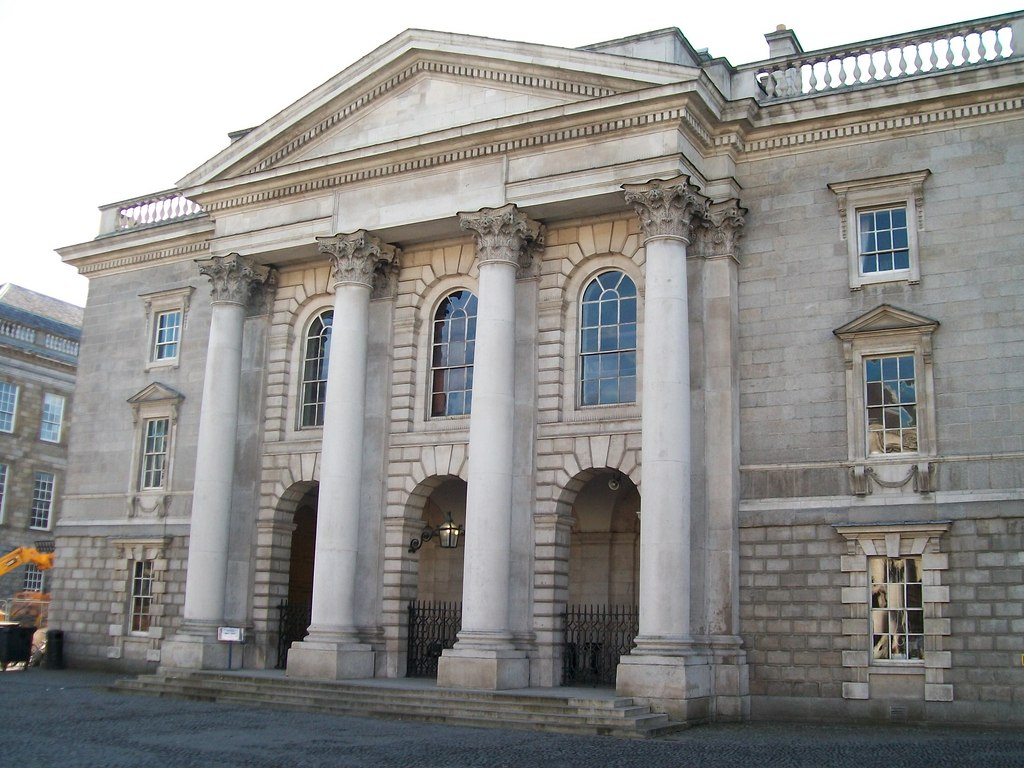
The Public Theatre, where public commencements take place.

These ceremonies are usually conducted in the Public Theatre in Parliament Square of Trinity College. As business is conducted in Latin the Chief Steward verbally asks for candidates to be put under scrutiny by saying "ad scrutinum", with the Doctors and Masters of the Senate present then asked in turn as distinct groups to consent to the degree being awarded to the candidate. (if they consent they say "Placet", if they do not consent they say "non-placet")

The Senate also holds a stated meeting in Hilary Term for the purpose of transacting business of the Senate other than the conferring of degrees. This meeting is conducted in English. Examples of such business are elections, approving amendments to University Statutes, approving the introduction of new degrees, and agreeing to confer an honorary degree on a specified individual. The actual conferment of such a degree, when agreed takes place at a later public commencements. Both discussion and voting takes place at these meetings, and propositions can be defeated, albeit, in practice, rarely. No business may be put before the meeting save with the consent of the board. Extra business meetings may be held if required. Business meetings are held in private.

Under statutes the University Senate elects two members to the University Council. The University Council is in effect part of the college, and not of the university. It is chaired by the provost, has the senior lecturer of the college as secretary, and governs academic matters. All decisions of the University Council require the approval of the board, but in general any decision of the council that does not require additional financial expenditure is agreed, often without discussion. The Senate also elects members to the Library Committee which oversees the Trinity College Library.

The Visitors are also dealt with in statutes. They consist of the chancellor of the university and one other person, usually, in modern times, a member of the Judiciary, and whose appointment requires the approval of the Senate. (So, in effect, both Visitors are university, not college appointments.) They are a final appeal should anyone contest a decision of the board or a procedure within college which has been appealed through departmental school, faculty, council, and board levels and is still contested. The visitors can therefore overturn a decision of the board. Given the chancellor of the university is one of two visitors and has the overall authority in difference of opinion between both visitors, it would seem the board of the college has also some degree of subsidiarity to the university.

It would be fair to say that the practical influence of the Senate has tended to diminish, as at one time it was the only formally constituted forum at which staff of the college, in particular those who were not Fellows, could have an input into the governance of the college and university. With the addition of elected representatives to the board, and the constitution of the council, which was largely elected from the start, issues which might once have been the subject of heated debate at a business meeting of the Senate are now decided elsewhere, with controversy mostly exhausted by the time an issue gets to the Senate for final determination. Consequently, the real importance of the Senate is as a mechanism to ensure that the other bodies carry out their functions properly lest they be queried at a Senate meeting.

=== Current officers ===
Mary McAleese is the current chancellor of the university, its titular head, and there are six pro-chancellors, who can act in her place. In March 2015, they were Professor Dermot F McAleese, Professor John Scattergood, Mary Henry, Edward McParland, Dame Jocelyn Bell Burnell and Sir Donnell Deeny. The chancellor and pro-chancellors are elected by the Senate. This is a function carried out without the intervention of the board, and so is entirely a university matter. This was not always the case, as the founding Charter of Queen Elizabeth I specified that successors to the first chancellor were to be elected by the Fellows, then when, later, the board of the college was established this power of election passed to it. The letters patent of Victoria as part of incorporating the Senate transferred the right of election to the Senate. The actual election procedures are set out in the university statutes. The current process is that when a vacancy for chancellor or pro chancellor occurs notice of this is sent by post to all members of the Senate who are invited to nominate candidates. In the event of a contest a secret ballot of senators is held at a special convened meeting of the Senate.

=== Senate composition ===
The undermentioned persons are members of the Senate, provided that in each case they are doctors or masters of the university:

1. Resident doctors or masters of the university, that is, doctors or masters who are not members of the college or university staff but who hold rooms in college or are in attendance on lectures in arts or in the professional schools.
2. Doctors and masters of the university who have held a Studentship of the university, or are Moderators who have been awarded a large gold medal, or moderators who have received a gold medal in or after 1935, or moderators who have received two moderatorships of a class higher than class III, and who have applied to the registrar of the Senate for membership of the Senate, without payment of fee.
3. Former Fellows of the college.
4. Representatives and former representatives of the university in Seanad Éireann.
5. Members of the staff of the college or university, during their tenure of office.
6. Doctors or masters of the university who have applied to the registrar of the Senate for membership of the Senate, and have paid a fee of (£5 in 1966 – €65 in 2012)

(Although these rules make every holder of master's degree or a doctorate eligible to be a member of the University Senate, they in practice facilitate a membership consisting largely of members of the staff of the college. Consequently, while the Senate in Dublin formally, or potentially resembles in composition the Senate at Cambridge, in practice it has a similar composition to the Regent House at Cambridge.)

== Degrees ==
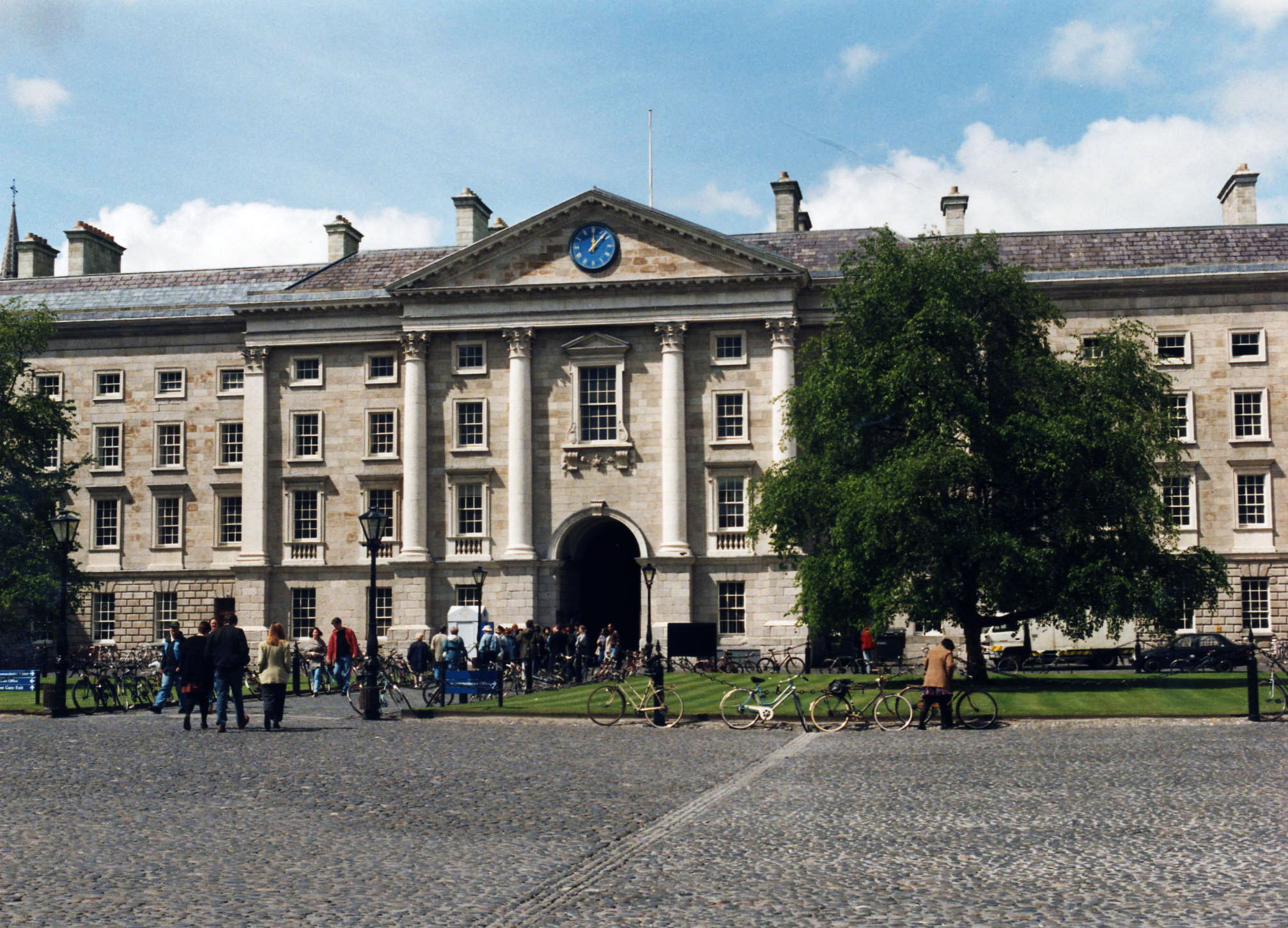
Front Square of Trinity College

Graduates of liberal degrees, i.e. non-professional such as Humanities or Science, receive an honours Bachelor of Arts degree from the University of Dublin after four years study in Trinity College, but may receive an ordinary B.A. after three years' study. A minority of courses result in the award of degrees by other names, such as Bachelor of Science. Bachelors of at least three years' standing may proceed to the degree of Master of Arts. Graduates in professional subjects such as Medicine, Dentistry or Engineering, receive professional degrees; these were in the past postgraduate, and consequently the graduands have an ordinary BA conferred on them first, followed by the relevant professional degree. In modern times they receive all their degrees at the same commencements, but (as with other non-professional degrees) they are technically eligible for the ordinary BA after the first three years of study.

Apart from MA degrees awarded on the basis of standing, the university may also award an MA degree ad eundem gradum to holders of Oxford and Cambridge MAs. This is a reciprocal arrangement with Dublin University MA degree holders being entitled, in turn, to apply for an MA from Oxford or Cambridge respectively. This originates from a medieval system of accreditation or degree recognition and is a formal statement that the degree from the other university is recognised. Currently the three universities have agreed that this degree will only be conferred in special cases, usually when the applicant is a member of staff away from their "Alma Mater" and require a Master's to participate fully in university governance.

Members of staff at Trinity College whose degrees are not from the University of Dublin, and do not qualify for an MA ad eundem gradum, may have the degree MA jure officii conferred. There are detailed rules for this, consisting of statutes proposed by the board and agreed by the Senate at a business meeting, with entitlement to the MA being based on years of service. Consequently, all the staff of the college after serving a qualifying period, can expect to receive the degree and so be able to enjoy membership of the Senate. (The practical significance of this is that the tendency for the great majority of participants in Senate business meetings to be members of staff of the college is reinforced.)

Other persons, holding specified kinds of high office may qualify for a degree Jure Dignatatis, but the awards of such degrees are now very rare having essentially been superseded by the practice of awarding honorary degrees.

At a point when women were allowed to study at Oxford and Cambridge, and be examined, and have the results published, but not receive degrees from their universities, they were able to obtain the relevant degree from the University of Dublin using the ad eundem gradum provision. As they had to travel to Dublin for the purpose, but had no other contact with the university they were known as the steamboat ladies. From 1975 University of Dublin degrees were awarded to graduates at the colleges of the Dublin Institute of Technology (DIT); this practice continued until 1998 when DIT gained the ability to award degrees in its own right. These two cases are examples of degrees being awarded by the University of Dublin to persons who have undertaken study and examination at institutions other than Trinity College, and without having been in any sense students at Trinity College.

=== Admissions ===
Undergraduate applications to the University of Dublin from Irish, British and European Union applicants are submitted through the Central Applications Office system. However, as the sole constituent college of the university, all applications must be made to Trinity College Dublin as no admissions office exists outside of the college's jurisdiction. Decisions on admissions to undergraduate courses are made by the Academic Registry who instruct the CAO to make offers to successful candidates. Admission to the university is highly competitive, and based exclusively on academic merit. In order to be considered for admission, all applicants must first reach the university's minimal matriculation requirements, which typically involves holding sufficient recognised qualifications in English, Mathematics and a second language, however, the Mathematics requirement can be waived if Latin is presented as a second language. Furthermore, applicants for certain courses may be required to achieve more specific qualifications than those prescribed for minimum matriculation requirements. Eligible applicants must then compete for places based on the results of their school leaving examinations, however, applicants can additionally take matriculation examinations which are held in the university in April, in which each subject is considered equivalent to that of the Irish Leaving Certificate. Applications for restricted courses require further assessment considered in the admissions process, such as the Health Professions Admissions Test (HPAT) for medicine or entrance tests for music and drama courses. As applications for most courses far exceeds available places, admission is highly selective, demanding excellent grades in the aforementioned examinations. Through the CAO, candidates may list several courses at Trinity College and at other third-level institutions in Ireland in order of preference. Places are awarded in mid-August every year by the CAO after matching the number of places available to the academic attainments of the applicants. Qualifications are measured as "points", with specific scales for the Leaving Certificate, UK GCE A-level, the International Baccalaureate and all other European Union school leaving examinations.

For applicants who are not citizens or residents of the European Union, different application procedures apply.; 16% of students are from outside Ireland, and 40% of these are from outside the European Union. Disadvantaged, disabled, or mature students can also be admitted through a program that is separate from the CAO, the Trinity Access Programme, which aims to facilitate the entry of sectors of society which would otherwise be under-represented. The numbers admitted on this program are significant relative to other universities, up to 15% of the annual undergraduate intake.

Admission to graduate study at the university is handled directly by Trinity College.

== Parliamentary representation ==
The university has been represented since 1613 when King James I granted it the right to elect two members of parliament (MPs) to the Irish House of Commons. When the Kingdom of Ireland and the Kingdom of Great Britain were joined with the Act of Union, which came into force in January 1801, the university sent one MP to the British House of Commons at Westminster until 1832, when it was given another. It continued to elect two until the establishment of the Irish Free State in December 1922. The Government of Ireland Act 1920 provided for a House of Commons of Southern Ireland, for which the university was to elect four MPs. As in Westminster, where university representatives were MPs and not peers, University of Dublin seats were in the Dáil and not the Seanad. These were the only MPs to attend the opening of the House in 1921 since Sinn Féin candidates in the twenty-six counties were returned unopposed and took the other 128 of the 132 seats. Sinn Féin recognised their own parliament determined by the Irish people as distinct to any continuation of British legislative rule under the British Government of Ireland Act. From 1923 to 1936, the university elected three TDs to sit in Dáil Éireann. Since the new Constitution of Ireland in 1937, the university has elected three Senators to Seanad Éireann.

The current Senators are David Norris, Lynn Ruane and Tom Clonan. Notable representatives have included Edward Gibson, W. E. H. Lecky, Edward Carson, Noel Browne, Conor Cruise O'Brien and Mary Robinson.

The franchise was originally restricted to the Provost, Fellows and scholars of Trinity College. This was expanded in 1832 to include those who had received an MA and in 1918 to all those who had received a degree from the university.

== See also ==
- Education in the Republic of Ireland
- List of universities in the Republic of Ireland
- List of alumni of the University of Dublin
- List of chancellors of the University of Dublin
- List of early modern universities in Europe
