= Galway Business School =

Private college in Galway, Ireland

- Type: Private business school
- Established: 2000
- Parent institution: Galway Cultural Institute
- Location: Galway, Ireland; 53.26298°N 9.07157°W
- Affiliations: QQI, BTEC/EDEXCEL, ICM, ACCA

Galway Business School is a private business school in Galway, Ireland. Opened in 2000, the college initially provided further education business courses, and now provides QQI-validated degree courses. Galway Business School (GBS) was set up by the Galway Cultural Institute (GCI) which provides English language courses. From 2003, GBS provided courses validated by the Business and Technology Education Council (BTEC/EDEXCEL) and the Institute of Commercial Management (ICM). GBS also provides ACCA preparatory courses and ECDL programmes.

In 2006, GBS became a recognised FETAC course provider. In 2014, the GBS business degree programme gained QQI accreditation.
