= Dublin Design Institute =

Private college in Dublin, Ireland

- Institiúid Dearadh Átha Cliath
- Type: Private/Independent Higher Education College
- Active: 1991–2023
- Affiliations: HETAC(now known as QQI), HECA, Edexcel, City & Guilds, University of South Wales
- President: Shane Connolly
- Students: 300
- Location: Corrib House, 52 Leeson Street Lower, Dublin 2, Ireland, Dublin, Ireland
- Campus: Dublin city centre (urban)
- Website: Dublindesign.ie

Dublin Design Institute (Irish: Institiúid Dearadh Átha Cliath)(DDI) was a private third level (higher education) college in Ireland that opened in 1991 and closed during summer 2023.

== History and operations ==
Established in 1991, Dublin Design Institute was known as the Dublin Institute of Design until 2022. The Institute grew to a student population of approximately 300 undergraduates studying in four specialised fields of design: Interior, Graphic, Web and Fashion Design. The college was validated by Quality and Qualifications Ireland.

The Institutes's Dublin city centre campus was adjacent to Grafton Street and St Stephens Green, directly across from the National Library of Ireland, though its principal address was later on Leeson Street. Behind trading / registered business names, the institute was operated by Educational Design Developments Limited. In June 2023, the institute announced its closure, due to the impact of Covid-19, rising costs and what it called "radical changes in the educational sector". On 21 July 2023, liquidators were appointed to the company, and from sometime in July 2023, the institute's website was not operational.

== Courses ==
Dublin Design Institute ran full and part-time degree and higher education qualifications in Interior Design, Graphic Design, Web Design, Fashion Design and shorter accredited programmes in Computer Aided Design, Visual Merchandising, Fashion Design, Personal Image & Styling, Graphic Design, Web Design, Interior Design, App Design, Product Design, and Digital Photography.

== Student Awards ==
=== 2015 ===
The Graphic Design Award by Yamaha (GDAY) is a global award that looks for new designs of marques, symbols, and pictograms that promote the theme of Kando. It was won by 3rd Year Full Time Graphic Design Degree Student Laurie Concannon in 2015, who received the first prize of $10,000 [US].

The 2015 Frankfurt Style Awards announced its shortlist for the catwalk show in April 2015. Siu-Hong Mok from 1st Year Full Time Fashion Design was selected to exhibit his garment "Less is More" in the Ecological Green catwalk show, one of two Irish representatives.

=== 2014 ===
The 2014 Dublin Fashion Festival announced the 12 finalists for their catwalk show in August 2014. Marian Witcher and Suzanne Stroker from Dublin Design Institute were included in the shortlist.

On 13 October 2014, TV3 announced a rival to RTÉ One's The Late Late Toy Show which broadcast live from the RDS on 21 November 2014. TV3 commissioned Dublin Design's Institutes fashion design students to create a dress from loom bands. The result was a dress inspired by Disney's Frozen (2013 film).
