= Central Applications Office =

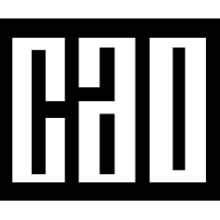
- Abbreviation: CAO
- Formation: 1976
- Legal status: Non-profit organisation (non-governmental body)
- Purpose: Applications to higher education
- Location: Tower House, Eglinton Street, Galway
- Region served: Ireland
- Chairman: Prof. Paul Giller
- Main organ: CAO Board of Directors
- Affiliations: NQAI, SEC, NFQ, FETAC, HETAC.
- Budget: €5m (2012)
- Website: cao.ie

The Central Applications Office (CAO) (Irish: An LárOifig Iontrála) is the organisation responsible for overseeing undergraduate applications to colleges and universities in the Republic of Ireland.

The primary mission of the Central Applications Office is to centrally process applications in a fair and efficient manner. The colleges and universities delegate the administration of admissions to the Central Applications Office; colleges and universities retain full control of admissions.

The Postgraduate Applications Centre was a related organisation that oversees some taught postgraduate courses.

== History ==
The Central Applications Office was founded in January 1976 based in Galway, with nine colleges and universities participating initially. The first students processed through the system commenced courses in 1978.

The Central Admissions Service (CAS) was introduced independently by the Dublin Institute of Technology and the Regional Technical Colleges, both of whom were outside the initial Central Applications Office.

Commencing in the 1991 intake the Central Applications Office and Central Admissions Service decided to combine their admissions procedures so that students would have to complete only one joint application form for both systems - the CAO/CAS. The common points scale came into operation the next year, with the best six results from one sitting of the Leaving Certificate becoming the standard; previous to that there had been some allowance to accumulate points by sitting the Leaving Certificate more than once. Also the combined system was taken as an opportunity to reduce non-standard applications such as interviews for selection and portfolios of work - and overall to simplify the applications process. Eventually the CAS was subsumed into the CAO.

== Background ==
Students applying for admission to third level education courses in Ireland apply to the CAO rather than to individual educational institutions such as colleges and universities. The CAO then offers places to students who meet the minimum requirements for a course for which they have applied. If for a particular course there are more qualified applicants than available places, the CAO makes offers to those applicants with the highest score in the CAO points system. If students do not accepts offers, or later decline them because they receive an offer for another course, the CAO makes further offers until all of the places have been filled or until the offer season closes.

=== Outside the points system ===
The points system is designed for young people leaving secondary education. Many institutions reserve places in some courses for older adults, people from disadvantaged backgrounds, or other groups unlikely to achieve a place through the points system. Applications for most of these are routed through the CAO, but processed manually by the individual institutions rather than automatically via the points system.

== The points system ==
Higher Level
Percentage	Grade	Points
90+	H1	100
80 - 89	H2	88
70 - 79	H3	77
60 - 69	H4	66
50 - 59	H5	56
40 - 49	H6	46
30 - 39	H7	37
>29	H8	0

Ordinary Level
Percentage	Grade	Points
90+	O1	56
80 - 89	O2	46
70 - 79	O3	37
60 - 69	O4	28
50 - 59	O5	20
40 - 49	O6	12
30 - 39	O7	0
>29	O8	0

The CAO awards points to students based on their achievements in the Leaving Certificate examination. A student's points are calculated according to these tables, counting their best six subjects only (resulting in a maximum score of 625 points since 2012 with the introduction of the extra 25 points awarded to those who sit the honours mathematics exam and pass). If a student has sat the Leaving Certificate examination on more than one occasion, their points are calculated according to their best year's performance. Students' points are used as a queuing system for over-subscribed courses, with the available places offered to those students ranked highest by the points scale.

Points can also be scored for results in other examinations, such as UK A levels. A level points for Universities, associated colleges and DIT are scored on the basis of the best four A levels or three A levels and an AS level in a different subject from the same or preceding year. From 2016 CAO point allocation for these exams is: A* (180), A (150), B (130), C (100), D (65) and E (45) for the first 3 A-Levels and A* (60), A (50), B (45), C (35), D (20) and E (15) for a fourth A Level. If using an AS Level as the fourth subject points are allocated as follows: A (30), B (25), C (20), D (15) and E (10)

In the Leaving Certificate Vocational Programme, students may obtain a Distinction (66 points), Merit (46 points), or Pass (28 points) that can be used as well as their 6 best subjects.

== See also ==
- Education in the Republic of Ireland
