= Irish Bible Institute =

Evangelical training body in Dublin, Ireland

- Institiúid Bíobla na hÉireann
- Former names: Irish Bible College; Irish Bible School
- Motto in English: Equipping the whole person, Head, Heart and Hands
- Type: Evangelical Bible College
- Established: 1982 (as Irish Bible School)
- Principal: Dr. Steven Singleton
- Location: Ulysees House, Foley St., Dublin, Ireland; 53.3519434°N 6.2509219°W
- Campus: Urban Online
- Accreditation: York St John University(from 2014); University of Wales(2005-2013)
- Website: www.ibi.ie

The Irish Bible Institute (IBI) is an evangelical Bible institute located in Dublin, Ireland. Although it is unaccredited by the National Qualifications Authority of Ireland, it's Honors Bachelors and Masters level courses in Applied Theology and Transformational Leadership are validated by York St John University, and so confirms to the Quality Assurance Agency for Higher Education of England and Wales regulations. The IBI is a registered charity in the Republic of Ireland, with donations contributing to the institute's income.

Academic programmes are delivered in class are also available online.

The Irish Bible School was founded in 1982 in Coalbrook, County Tipperary, by the Reverend Warren Nelson, a Church of Ireland minister. The Dublin Evangelical Library was transferred to the School in Coalbrook in 1983. The School of Biblical Christianity (SBC) was founded in 1992 to offer evening classes to Bible students in the Dublin area. Based at the Grace Bible Fellowship, Pearse Street, where Jacob Reynolds was pastor, in 1998 SBC came to be known as the Leadership Institute, after their main programme. In 2000 the Irish Bible School merged with the School of Biblical Christianity to form the Irish Bible Institute, with Jacob Reynolds as Principal. Since 2000 the IBI is based at its premises Ulysees House, Foley Street, off Talbot Street, Dublin 1. Ulysees House is used by a number of charities and organisations, that share the institute's ethos such as Agapé Ireland and the Evangelical Alliance Ireland, as well as hosting an English Language school. Vox magazine is produced by the staff of the IBI.

The former home of the Irish Bible School in Coalbrook is now the Christian run Remar Recovery Home.

In 2004 the IBI obtained validation from the University of Wales commencing from 2005, for its MA programme, and in 2006 for its BA programme, with the help of the Oxford Centre for Mission Studies (OCMS) International Programmes Project(IPP).

In 2009, students and staff from the Carraig Eden Theological College in Greystones (which itself had degrees awarded by the University of Wales), were transferred to the IBI, and since then IBI has been the official training institute for the Pentecostal, Christian Churches Ireland (formerly called the Assemblies of God Ireland).

In 2011 it was announced that the University of Wales, would end external validation. With the last University of Wales degrees awarded in 2013. The IBI secured new validation from York St John University, School of Humanities, in 2014, which was renewed in 2017 for another six years.

People involved in the institute include principal Dr. Steven Singleton who was appointed principal in 2018 succeeding Jacob Reynolds, and the director of learning Dr Patrick Mitchel.

As well as the certificate, degree and master's programmes, the IBI runs short and online courses.

The 2015 graduation took place in the RIASC Centre (Swords Baptist Church) in Swords, with Dr. Mitchell from Belfast Bible College as guest speaker.

In 2022, the IBI celebrated its fortieth anniversary since its foundation.

== See also ==
Other protestant faith Bible and theological schools in Ireland.

- Belfast Bible College
- Church of Ireland Theological Institute
- Irish Baptist College
- Union Theological College
