= Higher Education and Training Awards Council =

Degree validation and awarding body, Ireland (2001–2012)

HETAC
- Active: 1972 as the National Council for Educational Awards 2001 as HETAC–2012
- Location: Dublin, Ireland
- Website: http://www.hetac.ie

The Higher Education and Training Awards Council (Irish: Comhairle na nDámhachtainí Ardoideachais agus Oiliúna) (HETAC), the legal successor to the National Council for Educational Awards (NCEA), granted higher education awards in Ireland beyond the university system from 2001 to 2012. HETAC was created in 2001, subject to the policies of the National Qualifications Authority of Ireland, and, specifically, granted qualifications at many Institutes of Technology and other colleges. HETAC was dissolved and its functions were passed to Quality and Qualifications Ireland (QQI) on 6 November 2012.

== History ==
=== NCEA ===
The logo of the National Council for Educational Awards which sometimes appeared in different colour schemes.

In 1967 the Steering Committee on Technical Education recommended the creation of a body to control non-university higher qualifications, and in 1969 the Higher Education Authority similarly recommended the establishment of a "Council for National Awards" to better organise the non-university higher education sector; the HEA recommendations were tentative, to be refined after application to the work of the newly-established National Institute for Higher Education, Limerick. Following these recommendations, the National Council for Educational Awards (NCEA) was founded in April 1972 on an ad-hoc basis. The Minister for Education, Padraig Faulkner, specified its terms of reference, including the promotion and coordination of industrial, professional, commercial and scientific education, and the conferring of certificates, diplomas and degrees. The NCEA granted the first National Certificates, 93 in number, in 1972; these were awarded at five Regional Technical Colleges. The NCEA granted its first bachelor degrees, to four students in Physical Education, in 1974.

Early on it was decided that the NCEA would be the only extra-university award-conferring institution in the State for higher education, rather than having a multitude of competing institutions, with authority to grant awards at all academic levels including degree level. Hence it was the award-granting body for NIHE Limerick, for example. Despite this, the Fine Gael-Labour (National Coalition) government limited the NCEA to sub-degree awards only from early 1976, and the later Fianna Fáil government of 1977 restored its full powers in November 1977, and placed the NCEA on a statutory footing in 1980 by commencing the National Council for Educational Awards Act, 1979.

In 1982 the first master's degree is awarded at NIHE Limerick in Arts, Business Studies and Engineering, and in 1985 the first doctorate degree was awarded at NIHE Dublin.

The founding director of the National Council for Educational Awards was Padraig Mac Diarmada, whose educational vision and philosophy contributed to further development of higher and continuing education in Ireland and whose vision enabled students to attain educational qualifications which would never have been envisioned by them prior to 1972. The last director (CEO) of the council was former Holy Trinity NS (Donaghmede) national school teacher and former INTO President Séamus Puirséil (Seamus Purcell).

=== Establishment of HETAC ===
HETAC was created in 2001 under the Qualifications (Education and Training) Act, 1999 (Section 21). It inherited the work of the NCEA, validating and awarding qualifications up to degree level, for the institutes of technology and a wide range of third-level institutions.

The first chief executive of HETAC was the former head of the NCEA, Seamus Puirseil. He was succeeded in 2008 by Gearóid Ó Conluain, formerly Deputy Chief Inspector of Department of Education and Science.

=== Merger into QQI ===
In October 2008 the Irish Government announced its intention to amalgamate HETAC with FETAC and NQAI, the two other bodies established under the Qualifications Act, while also incorporating the functions for the external review of Irish universities then carried out by the Irish Universities Quality Board. HETAC was dissolved and Quality and Qualifications Ireland came into being on November 6th 2012.

== Awards ==
In 2004 HETAC completed the transition from awards derived from the NCEA standards to a new awards system based on the National Framework of Qualifications. A rough correspondence between the awards of the two systems is shown below.

Legacy	Current
Certificate†	
National Certificate†	Higher Certificate‡
National Diploma†	Ordinary bachelor's degree‡
Honours bachelor's degree	Honours bachelor's degree
Graduate Diploma (conversion)†	Higher Diploma‡
Graduate Diploma (professional)†	Postgraduate Diploma‡
Master's degree	Master's degree
Doctorate degree	Doctorate degree
† Not granted after June 2006. ‡ Granted from July 2004.

== Recognised institutions ==
The providers of courses which lead to HETAC awards were called "recognised institutions", recognised under the Qualifications (Education & Training) Act, 1999 (Section 24). Some of these institutions were granted "delegation of authority" (often referred to as "delegated authority") which allowed them to make HETAC awards in their own name, this was limited to the Institutes of Technology and often to certain award levels at certain institutions.

=== Section 24 (1)(a) ===
==== Regional Technical Colleges ====
- Athlone Institute of Technology
- Institute of Technology, Blanchardstown
- Institute of Technology, Carlow
- Cork Institute of Technology
- Dún Laoghaire Institute of Art, Design and Technology
- Dundalk Institute of Technology
- Galway-Mayo Institute of Technology
- Letterkenny Institute of Technology
- Limerick Institute of Technology
- Institute of Technology, Sligo
- Institute of Technology, Tallaght
- Institute of Technology, Tralee
- Waterford Institute of Technology

==== Non-RTC bodies ====
- National College of Ireland

=== Section 24 (1)(b) ===
(Other bodies, public and private sector)

- The American College, Dublin
- Development Studies Centre, Kimmage
- Dorset College
- Dublin Business School
- FISC Ireland Ltd.
- Galway Business School
- Garda Síochána College
- Grafton College of Management Sciences
- Griffith College
- Hibernia College
- ICD Business School
- Institute of Public Administration
- Irish Academy of Public Relations
- Leinster Academy, Leinster Rugby IRFU
- Military College
- Milltown Institute
- National College of Ireland
- National Tourism Development Authority (formerly CERT)
- Newpark Music Centre
- The Open Training College
- Portobello Institute
- Setanta College
- St. Nicholas Montessori College, Ireland
- St. Patrick's, Carlow College
- Thomas Crosbie Holdings Ltd
- Tipperary Institute (Since 2011 part of Limerick Institute of Technology)

=== Former Providers ===
Institutions whose degrees were formerly awarded by HETAC, or its forerunner the NCEA before 2002; some no longer exist.

- All Hallows College – degrees awarded by Dublin City University from 2008 to dissolution
- Burren College of Art awarded by NUIG from 2003
- Clonliffe College - humanities diplomas were validated by the NCEA
- Dublin Institute of Technology – until, in 1998, the DIT got degree-awarding status, its awards were made by TCD and the NCEA
- Froebel College of Education – moved to NUI Maynooth who validate its diplomas since
- HSI Limerick Business School – closed in 2011
- Irish Management Institute – since 2012 UCC validates its degrees
- Kimmage Mission Institute – moved to Milltown Institute in 2003
- LSB College – part of Dublin Business School since 2000
- Lee Business Institute, Cork
- Mid West Business Institute - taken over by Griffith College
- National College of Art and Design – degrees awarded by NCEA from 1984 to June 2003, NUI since
- Newman College, Dublin – closed in 1995
- Portobello College – now part of Dublin Business School
- St. John's College, Waterford - from 1977 NCEA validated diplomas in Theology and Philosophy
- St. Patrick's College, Thurles - diplomas from 1977, and degrees from 1988; since 2011 courses validated by University of Limerick)
- St. Peter's College, Wexford - NCEA validated Theology and Philosophy diplomas until closure in 1999
- Shannon College of Hotel Management – affiliated to NUI since 2001, and NUIG since 2009
- Skerry's Cork Business School – bought by Griffith College in 2005

== See also ==
- Education in the Republic of Ireland
- Further Education and Training Awards Council
