= Higher diploma =

Academic award

A higher diploma is an academic award in Iraq, Libya, the United Kingdom, Singapore, Hong Kong, Ireland and Oman. In Iraq, it is awarded one year after a bachelor's degree (i.e., not equivalent to a bachelor's degree). In Ireland it is a postgraduate qualification at the same level as the honours bachelor's degree. In the United Kingdom, the diploma is equivalent to higher tier (A*-C) GCSE.

== Iraq ==
A postgraduate university program is the 2-Terms Diploma (Arabic: دبلوم عالي ) course. The first year is made up of higher coursework, and students write a thesis after the two terms. The entrance requirement for this programme is a pass mark (50-59%) for the bachelor's degree in the same discipline.

== Libya ==
The Higher Diploma AKA High Diploma (Arabic: دبلوم عالي) in Libya is an award from a national institute of technology or engineering given to the students who fulfil the requirement of passing 120 to 140 academic credits, it was started in 1980s by ministry of higher education as a degree with emphasis on the practical studies that benefits the local market comparing to the "theoretical approach" was taken by the universities (Higher diploma is a degree in higher education).

== United Kingdom ==
In the UK, the higher diploma is a level 2 qualification on the Regulated Qualifications Framework, following the recently introduced 14- to 19-year-old Diploma system for the UK, which follows two levels, lower tier (Level 1) and higher tier (Level 2). To proceed to A-Levels in England, Northern Ireland, and Wales; you have to have completed a specified amount of qualifications at-least equivalent to A*-C GCSE (Level 2).

The higher diploma program usually consists of four major subjects: Maths, English, ICT, and a subject you want to study more in-depth.

== Singapore ==
A higher diploma (Advanced and Specialist Diploma), is an academic award by a university, college, tertiary institutions or post-secondary institutions. The award is at the same level as an associate degree or diploma/advanced diploma qualifications framework Level 6, but below the standard of a bachelor's degree.

== Hong Kong ==
A higher diploma is an academic award by a university, college, other tertiary institutions, or post-secondary institutions. The award is at the same level as an associate degree or diploma/advanced diploma qualifications framework Level 4, but below the standard of a bachelor's degree. It is also above a lower-level certificate; and lower-level diploma.

== Ireland ==
The Higher Diploma (Ard-Dioplóma in Irish) is an award from Quality and Qualifications Ireland which in 2012 took over responsibilities from the Higher Education and Training Awards Council that replaces the graduate diploma in Ireland. The higher diploma is currently available in universities in Ireland; the standard of the award is broadly similar to the graduate diploma, and replaces reorientation-type courses. Professional-type graduate diplomas will be replaced by postgraduate diplomas.

== Oman ==
The Higher Diploma is a one-year course with 30 credit hours after achieving the diploma.

== See also ==
- Diploma
- Professional certification
- National Qualifications Framework
