= Irish Primary Principals Network =

Professional body for Ireland's primary school leaders

Irish Primary Principals’ Network (IPPN) was established in 2000 and has become the recognised professional body for Ireland’s primary school leaders. With a membership of over 6,000 Principals and Deputy Principals, the IPPN is an independent, not-for-profit, voluntary association, a registered charity, a company limited by guarantee and an officially recognised Education Partner.
