= Dorset College =

Private third-level education provider in Dublin, Ireland

Coordinates: 53.3609°N 6.2607°W

- Motto: Excellence Through Life-Long Learning
- Type: private
- Established: 1983
- Location: Dublin, Ireland
- Campus: Urban
- Affiliations: QQI, CIPD, PMI, ACELS, MEI, HECA
- Website: www.dorset.ie

Dorset College is a private college, located in Dublin city centre. Founded in 1983, it provides training in Computing, Business, English Language, University Foundation Programmes and Healthcare. A number of its programmes are accredited by the QQI at level 5 to level 8 on the Irish National Framework, as well as this it has programmes validated by professional bodies such as CIPD, QQI ACELS (English Language) and PMI.

While many of its courses are Post Leaving Certificate and part-time professional training, it also provides a Bachelor of Business degree and a Bachelor of Business (Hons) in International Business, validated by QQI, who also validate the Bachelor of Science in Computing degree.

Dorset College is recognised by The Advisory Council for English Language Schools in Ireland (ACELS), under the auspices of The Irish Department of Education & Science, for the teaching of English as a foreign language.

In November 2021, Dorset College joined the European, Erasmus Charter in Higher Education (ECHE).

The college has four campuses, in Dorset Street, Belvedere Place, Mountjoy Square and the ABC Building in Drumcondra. There is a library. The college also offer a recruitment service to students, helping with CV preparation and interview skills.
