= Newman College, Dublin =

Newman College Dublin was a for profit private college in Dublin, Ireland. It had premises in Merrion Square and in Newtownpark Avenue, Blackrock, Co. Dublin.

The college ran a number of pre-university and repeat Irish Leaving Certificate courses from Merrion Square, A-Levels were also taught.

The college also ran a variety of Business, Sales, Marketing, IT, Legal Studies, Journalism and Media Courses, from Certificates and Diplomas up to Degrees. In 1992 the BA Business Administration degree was developed and validated by the Southampton Institute. in the UK.

In 1992 the college became a designated Higher Education College of the Irish Government's NCEA.

In 1995 the business collapsed and became part of the private college Griffith College Dublin.

Newman College Dublin owned the Pre-University Centre (PUC) in Fitzwilliam Street, Dublin, which was taken over by three teachers after it went into liquidation in 1994, it was sold in 2000 to the Institute of Education (Dublin).
