= Hibernia College =

Teacher training college in Ireland

- Coláiste Hibernia
- Type: Private
- Established: 2000
- Affiliations: QQI; Teaching Council; NMBI
- Location: Block B, Merrion Centre, Merrion Road, Dublin 4, Dublin, Ireland; 53.31917°N 6.21383°W
- Campus: Online
- Language: English, Irish
- Website: http://www.hiberniacollege.com/

- Location within Dublin

Hibernia College is a private third-level college in Ireland, founded in 2000 by Dr Seán Rowland and owned since 2021 by the Folens Group. It provides professional qualifications in education and healthcare through blended learning at undergraduate and postgraduate levels.

== Education ==
The Professional Master of Education programme is offered for trainee teachers at primary and post-primary level. The degree is a 120-credit award at NFQ level 9, taken over a 24-month period. Students can commence their studies in spring or autumn.

== Research ==
The School of Education pursues research as a core strategy to improve evidence-based practice in education and training. The college has partnered with other entities including Harvard University, Economic and Social Research Institute, Law Society of Ireland, National Forum for the Advancement of Teaching and Learning in Higher Education, Standing Conference on Teacher Education North and South, University College Dublin, Marino Institute of Education, Stranmillis University and Trinity College Dublin.
