= Grafton College London =

- London; England

Information
- Type: private
- Established: 2003
- Campus: 133–135 Oxford Street
- Website: http://www.graftoncollege.com

Grafton College London was a small, private college that provided undergraduate, postgraduate and professional training courses.

== Curriculum ==
It provided business and management courses in London. The college ran courses in business, management, computing, accounting & finance and travel & tourism and English language.

The Open University offered degree courses in partnership with Grafton College, but suspended registration following fraud allegations.

== History ==
The college was founded in 2003. The college taught courses supplied by Pearson PLC until it suspended its relationship with Grafton College following a 2017 BBC Panorama investigation.

=== Panorama investigation ===
In 2017 an investigation broadcast on 13 November 2017 by BBC Panorama found cases of student loan fraud and breaches of academic integrity at the college, including an offer from hairdresser Saeed Imran Sheikh that assignments could be fraudulently completed by agents in Pakistan, and an example of a fraudulent certificate produced by the British Awarding Association (Awarding Body for Vocational Achievement (AVA) Ltd) located in the same building as Grafton College. Sheikh claimed that he had obtained them from Grafton's Head of Operations Alex.
