= Dublin Business School =

Private college in Dublin, Ireland

Coordinates: 53.3406°N 6.2656°W

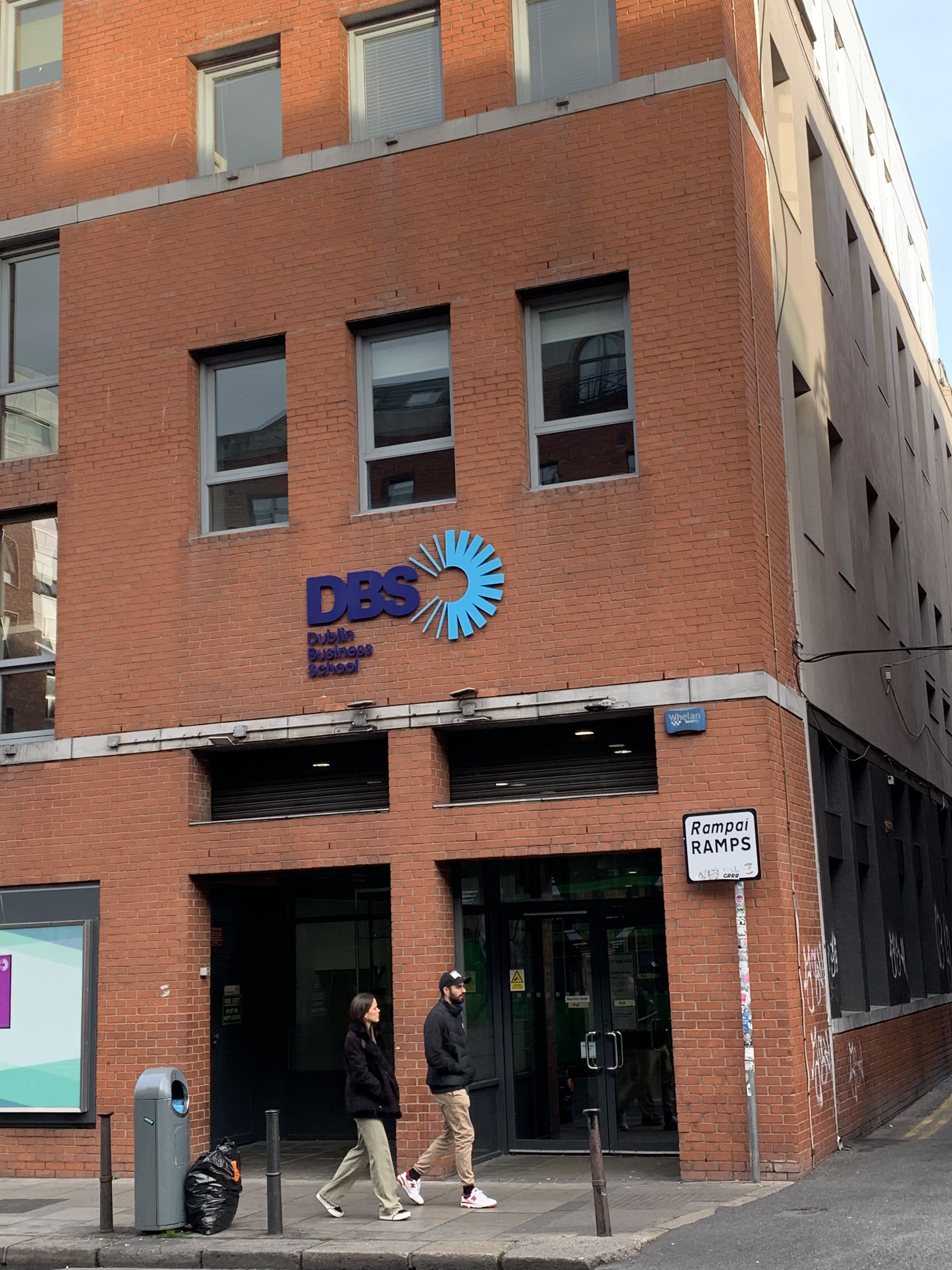
- DBS building on Aungier Street, Dublin
- Former names: Accountancy and Business College
- Type: Private
- Established: 1975
- Affiliations: QQI, HECA
- Students: Approximately 9,000
- Location: Aungier Street, Dublin, Ireland
- Owner: Kaplan Inc.
- Website: dbs.ie

Dublin Business School (DBS) is a private college in Dublin, Ireland. With over 9,000 students, DBS provides full-time and part-time undergraduate and postgraduate programmes in business, marketing, management computing, law, accounting, IT, arts, creative media, psychotherapy and psychology. The college's undergraduate and part-time degrees are awarded by Quality and Qualifications Ireland (QQI). The college is owned by Kaplan, Inc., part of the Graham Holdings Company.

== History ==
DBS was founded in 1975 as the Accountancy and Business College. In 1999, Dublin Business School acquired LSB College Dublin. In 2003, DBS was taken over by Kaplan, Inc., then a wholly owned subsidiary of The Washington Post Company, and, by 2004, it had around 5,500 students. In 2006, DBS bought European Business School Dublin (EBS), a collective of eight independent business schools located throughout Europe.

Portobello College, a law school led by Raymond Kearns, was taken over by DBS in 2007. It allowed DBS to incorporate a law school offering both undergraduate and postgraduate programmes to its students. In 2008, the Lidl chain of supermarkets made an agreement with DBS to create a degree oriented to the retail industry.

== Campus ==
The Dublin Business School has six locations around Dublin. Its main campus is located at Aungier Street and South Great George's Street.
