= Further Education and Training Awards Council =

FETAC
- Active: 2001–2012
- Location: Dublin, Ireland
- Website: http://www.fetac.ie

The Further Education and Training Awards Council (Irish: Comhairle na nDámhachtainí Breisoideachais agus Oiliúna) or FETAC was a statutory qualification-awarding body for further education in Ireland. It was established on 11 June 2001 under the Qualifications (Education and Training) Act 1999. FETAC was dissolved and its functions were passed to Quality and Qualifications Ireland (QQI) on 6 November 2012.

FETAC was the successor to the National Council for Vocational Awards (NCVA) and also made awards previously made by Fáilte Ireland – National Tourism Development Authority (previously Bord Fáilte and CERT, the Council for Education, Recruitment and Training), FÁS – Training and Employment Authority, National Council for Educational Awards (Foundation Certificate only) and Teagasc – Agriculture and Food Development Authority.

As well as making awards, FETAC validated, monitored and ensured the quality of teaching programmes, and determined standards.

FETAC did not deliver education and training programmes itself; they were delivered by a number of bodies in both the public and private sectors. Examples of teaching bodies in the public sector were Bord Iascaigh Mhara, CERT, FÁS, Teagasc, the Vocational Education Committees and Institutes of Technology.

Awards granted by FETAC were included in the ten-level National Framework of Qualifications established by the National Qualifications Authority of Ireland. FETAC awards fell into levels 1 – 6 of the framework.

== See also ==
- Education in Ireland
- Higher Education and Training Awards Council
