= National Qualifications Authority of Ireland =

Former governmental authority

The National Qualifications Authority of Ireland or NQAI (Údarás Náisiúnta Cáilíochtaí na hÉireann in Irish) was set up in 2001 under the Qualifications (Education & Training) Act, 1999 to develop and promote the implementation of a National Framework of Qualifications across education and training in Ireland. NQAI was dissolved and its functions were passed to Quality and Qualifications Ireland (QQI) on 6 November 2012.

== The Authority's role ==
The Authority's principal tasks were as follows:

- To establish and enable the implementation of the National Framework of Qualifications (NFQ)
- To enable improved arrangements for access, transfer and progression for learners
- To facilitate the recognition of international awards

== The National Framework ==
As one of its main functions, the NQAI established the National Framework of Qualifications (NFQ). The NFQ is a ten-stage system incorporating educational and training awards from certificate to doctoral level. Awards no longer made are included in the framework for reference purposes.

== See also ==
- Education in the Republic of Ireland
- Institutes of Technology in Ireland
- List of universities in the Republic of Ireland
- State Examinations Commission
