= National Framework of Qualifications =

Educational qualifications framework

The National Framework of Qualifications (NFQ) is a system used to describe levels of educational qualifications in Ireland. Responsibility for maintaining and developing the framework lies with Quality and Qualifications Ireland (QQI).

Launched in 2003, the NFQ was developed by the National Qualifications Authority of Ireland as a means of comparing training and qualifications between institutions of education at all levels. It encompasses learning at primary and second level, as well as acting as a benchmark for required standards for graduates of courses offered by QQI, and universities. The framework consists of 10 "Levels", ranging from Certificates at Level 1 which signify initial learning to degrees at doctoral level. A 'fan diagram' is used to illustrate the progression of the levels.

== Framework ==
EQF level	EHEA cycle	NFQ level	Major award types
1		1	Level 1 Certificate
1		2	Level 2 Certificate
2		3	Level 3 Certificate; Junior Certificate
3		4	Level 4 Certificate; Leaving Certificate
4		5	Level 5 Certificate; Leaving Certificate
5		6	Advanced Certificate
5	Short cycle within 1st	6	Higher Certificate
6	1st	7	Ordinary bachelor's degree
	1st	8	Honours bachelor's degree Higher Diploma
7	2nd	9	Master's Degree; Post-Graduate Diploma
8	3rd	10	Doctoral Degree; Higher Doctorate
