= Quality and Qualifications Ireland =

Irish state quality assurance and qualifications agency

- Dearbhú Cáilíochta agus Cáilíochtaí Éireann

Agency overview
- Formed: 6 November 2012; 13 years ago
- Preceding agencies: National Qualifications Authority of Ireland; Further Education and Training Awards Council; Higher Education and Training Awards Council; Irish Universities Quality Board
- Type: Statutory body
- Jurisdiction: Ireland
- Headquarters: 26/27 Denzille Lane, Dublin 2, Ireland
- Agency executives: Dr Lynn Ramsey, Chief Executive Officer; Professor Irene Sheridan, Chairperson
- Parent department: Department of Further and Higher Education, Research, Innovation and Science
- Website: www.qqi.ie

Quality and Qualifications Ireland (QQI; Irish: Dearbhú Cáilíochta agus Cáilíochtaí Éireann) is the state agency responsible for promoting the quality, integrity and reputation of Ireland's further and higher education system. It is responsible for external quality assurance in further and higher education and training, for maintaining the National Framework of Qualifications (NFQ), for validating programmes and making certain awards, and for providing information on qualifications and learning opportunities.

== History ==
QQI was established under the Qualifications and Quality Assurance (Education and Training) Act 2012. The establishment day for the authority was 6 November 2012. It followed the amalgamation of the Further Education and Training Awards Council (FETAC), the Higher Education and Training Awards Council (HETAC), the Irish Universities Quality Board (IUQB) and the National Qualifications Authority of Ireland (NQAI).

The Qualifications and Quality Assurance (Education and Training) (Amendment) Act 2019 amended the 2012 Act, including provisions relating to listed awarding bodies, learner protection, and the International Education Mark.

== Functions ==
QQI sets standards for QQI awards, assesses the fitness of providers to offer QQI awards, validates programmes of education and training leading to QQI awards, awards qualifications and issues certificates. It also maintains the statutory learner protection fund for learners enrolled with private education and training providers.

In quality assurance, QQI issues quality assurance guidelines, approves providers' quality assurance procedures, monitors and reviews providers, and promotes awareness and maintenance of academic integrity. QQI is also responsible for authorising use of the International Education Mark, branded as TrustEd Ireland, for higher education and English language education providers that meet national standards for provision to international learners.

== Qualifications system ==
QQI is responsible for the promotion, maintenance, development and review of the National Framework of Qualifications. The NFQ is a ten-level framework used to describe qualifications in the Irish education and training system. Qualifications included in the NFQ and the programmes leading to them are listed in the Irish Register of Qualifications.

QQI is the national awarding body for further education and training and for certain providers in higher education and training. It also validates programmes proposed by providers where those programmes are intended to lead to QQI awards.

== International and European roles ==
QQI operates NARIC Ireland, the National Academic Recognition Information Centre of Ireland, which provides advice on the recognition of foreign qualifications in Ireland. NARIC Ireland is a member of the ENIC-NARIC network and uses the Lisbon Recognition Convention in relation to recognition of qualifications.

QQI manages Ireland's National Europass Centre and is the designated European Qualifications Framework National Coordination Point for Ireland. It is a member of the European Association for Quality Assurance in Higher Education and is registered on the European Quality Assurance Register for Higher Education.

== Governance ==
QQI is a public body reporting to the Minister for Further and Higher Education, Research, Innovation and Science. It is partly funded by government and partly by fees for its services, and is independent in the performance of its functions under the 2012 Act.

As of May 2026, the chairperson of QQI is Professor Irene Sheridan. Dr Lynn Ramsey was appointed Chief Executive Officer in 2025 and took up the post on 3 November 2025.
