= Griffith College Limerick =

Private college in Limerick, Ireland

Coordinates: 52.6583946°N 8.6332071°W

- An Coláiste Uí Ghríofa, Luimnigh
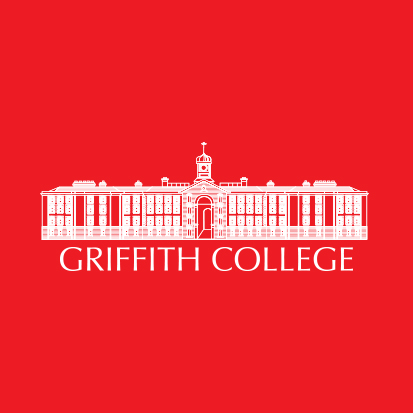
- Griffith College logo
- Established: 1988 (Mid West Business Institute), 2006 (Griffith College Limerick)
- Affiliations: QQI, HETAC, HECA, ACCA
- President: Diarmuid Hegarty
- Students: 800
- Location: 3 Quinlan St, V94 DK23, Limerick, Ireland
- Website: http://www.griffith.ie

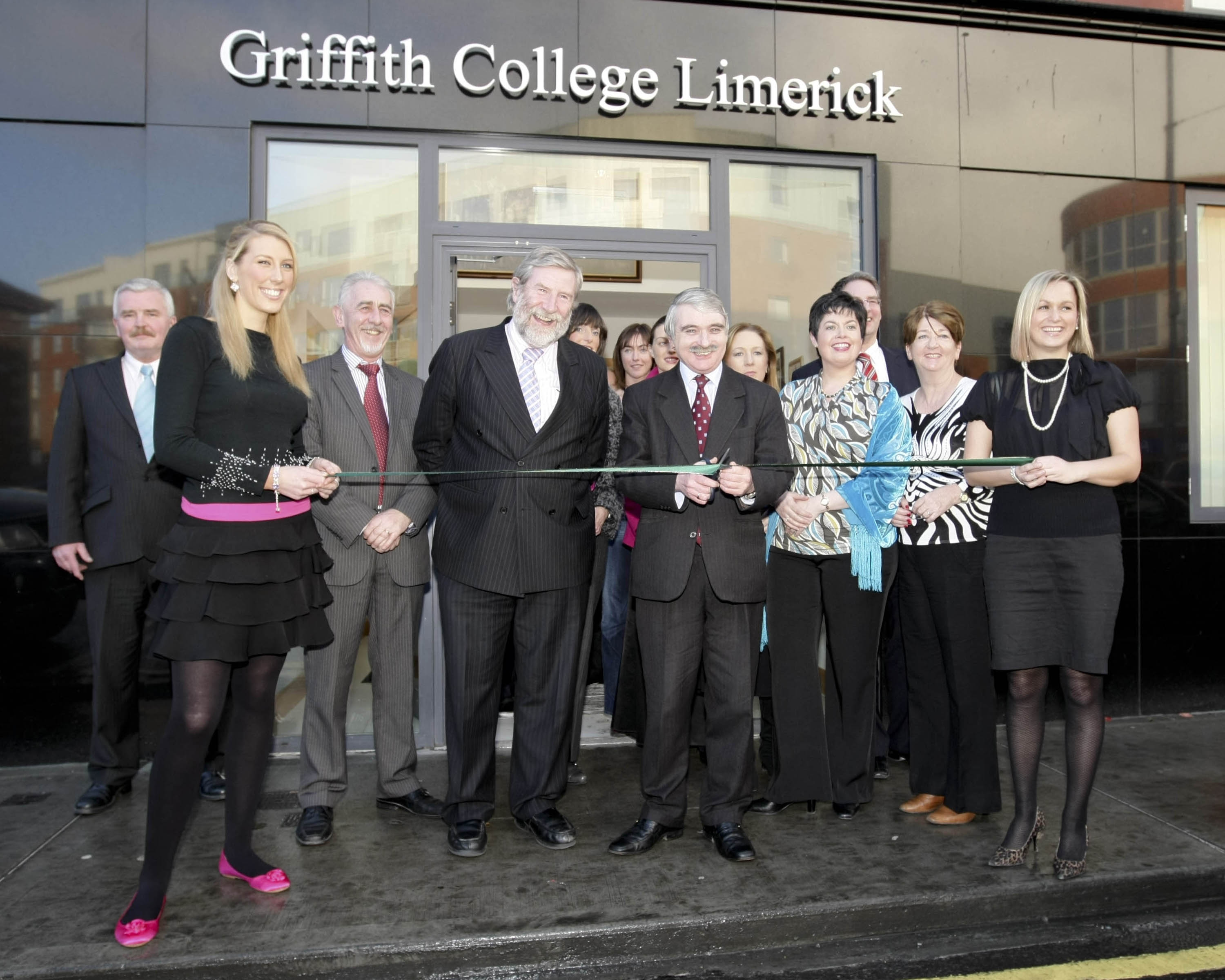
Griffith College Limerick, Official Opening

Griffith College Limerick (GCL) (Irish: Coláiste Uí Ghríofa, IPA:[ˈkɔlaːʃtʲəˈiːˈʝɾʲiːfˠə]) is a private third level (higher education) college in Limerick, Ireland. The college was established in 2006 when the Mid West Business Institute was acquired by Griffith College Dublin. The college runs full-time and part-time courses in accountancy, business, law, engineering, computing, and information technology, and has a range of part-time courses available.

Originally located in the Old Town Hall, Rutland Street, Limerick, it moved to a newer and larger premises on 31/32 Upper William Street, Limerick, in December 2008. The new building was officially opened by the Minister of Defence Willie O'Dea T.D. on 23 January 2009. In 2013 the college moved from Upper William Street to the site of the former HSI Limerick Business School on O'Connell Avenue.

== Courses ==
=== Accountancy ===
The college offers professional accountancy full and part-time programmes for the Association of Chartered Certified Accountants (ACCA) and the Accounting Technicians Ireland as well as the ACCA Diploma in Financial Management. Griffith College Dublin – School of Professional Accountancy runs the Chartered Accountant (ACA) course in Limerick with lectures at Mary Immaculate College. As of 2009, ACCA part-time programmes are conducted by lecturers from the Professional Accountancy Department at Griffith College Cork in Limerick; these are papers F4 to F9, P1 to P3, P6, and P7. Similarly, Certified Public Accountant (CPA) programmes Formation 2, Professional 1, and Professional 2 are also available in Limerick.

=== Business and finance ===
The college runs a number of full-time courses in Business validated by HETAC as well as full and part-time Institute of Commercial Management (ICM) and Business And Technology Education Council (BTEC) courses in Marketing, Human Resources Management, Travel and Tourism, Sports Management, and Office Administration. Students can earn a BA (Hons) in Accounting and Finance (HETAC), a Higher Certificate in Business and Business Administration. The college is on the Central Applications Office (CAO) system. In 2009, a Postgraduate Diploma in Business Management (NCC Education), part of a programme leading to an MBA awarded by the University of Gloucestershire, commenced.

=== Law ===
Griffith Colleges The Professional Law School runs courses for the examinations for entry to the Law Society of Ireland in Limerick. These lectures were delivered in the Castleroy Hotel until the hotel closed due to financial problems in early 2009. The course was moved to the new college building. The college also runs a number of ICM validated diploma courses in legal studies.

=== Computing and information technology ===
There are a number of day and evening courses in Computing and Information Technology at GCL. In line with the computing courses in Griffith College Dublin, 2010 saw the commencement of the Higher Certificate in Computing, the BSc in Computing, both validated by HETAC. Other courses include the Higher Diploma in Computing, the Higher Diploma in Science in Web Development and the Higher Diploma in Science in IT Infrastructures, (all validated by HETAC), the Diploma in Business Computing (ICM), Advanced Diploma in Personal Computing, Certificate/Diploma in Web and Internet Technologies (ICM), and International Diploma in Computer Studies (IDCS). There is a Postgraduate Diploma (awarded by NCC Education) and an MSc in Strategic Business Information Technology (awarded by University of Portsmouth).

=== Engineering ===
In 1998, the first engineering course commenced at the Mid West Business Institute, and GCL remains the only private third level college in Ireland providing engineering courses. Griffith College Limerick offers part-time and full-time courses in Mechanical, Electrical, and Electronic Engineering.

=== Evening courses ===
Griffith College Limerick also provides a number of training courses in Engineering, Business, Computing, Law, Media, Psychology, Operations and Training, and Production and Inventory.

=== In the past ===
In the past the Mid West Business Institute provided MBA programmes awarded by University of Surrey in the UK. Other programmes were awarded by Oxford Brookes University in the UK, and some business degree programmes were run in conjunction with the Limerick Institute of Technology (LIT). The BSc (Hons) in Computing and Internet Systems was also awarded by University of Huddersfield.

== Facilities and services ==
The college has four lecture halls with ceiling-mounted overhead projectors that seat over four hundred students. A large quiet area beside the library for study is available to students. There is a canteen / recreation room available to students to meet and relax. Tea, coffee, and vending machines provide light snacks.

=== Computer rooms ===
The college has three modern networked computer rooms with wired and wireless internet access, printers, and all software required for the various IT and Engineering courses that are delivered at the college.

=== Engineering labs ===
The college has two Engineering labs with electronic test equipment, pneumatic boards, and equipment and components for experiments associated with the Engineering programmes.

=== Library ===
Course-related books and journals are available from the library. On-line research facilities are available for students as well as the ability to access course materials and lecture notes.

=== Student services ===
Griffith College Limerick offers its students academic and pastoral counselling, assistance with professional course-based work placement and casual employment, and assistance with visa extensions, opening bank accounts, medical insurance, accommodation, and travel.

As in the MWBI days, a number of full-time programmes are entitled to tax relief such as the HETAC Higher Certificate in Business.

== Graduation ==
The graduation ceremony takes place each November. The 2010 ceremony took place on Monday 8 November. The graduation ceremony was hosted in St Mary's Cathedral; in attendance were Deputy Mayor of Limerick Cllr. Diarmuid Scully; Mr. Willie O'Dea TD; Mr. Gearóid Ó'Conluain – chief executive, Higher Education & Training Awards Council (HETAC); and Mr. Diarmuid Hegarty – President, Griffith College.

The 2009 ceremony took place on 5 November, with students graduating from the college's HETAC, BTEC/EDEXCEL, NCC Education, and ICM programmes.

The 2008 ceremony was attended by family and friends of graduates, representatives of validation bodies such as HETAC, BTEC Edexcel, ICM, and NCC, and local elected representatives including Councilor Kathleen Leddin, Deputy Mayor of Limerick City, who assisted in the presentation of awards.

The 2007 ceremony was addressed by the then Deputy Mayor of Limerick, Councillor John Gilligan, who helped present the awards to the graduates. The 2006 ceremony was attended by Mayor of Limerick City Joe Leddin.

A number of additional College awards are presented at graduation, such as the GCL – HETAC Student of the Year, GCL – BTEC Student of the Year, and Overall Griffith College Limerick Student of the Year.

Separate award ceremonies take place for ACCA, ATI, and other students with their awarding bodies.
