= Mid West Business Institute =

Former college in Ireland

- Mid West Business Institute
- Motto in English: Leading through Learning
- Type: Private
- Active: 1988–2006
- Affiliations: HETAC, HECA
- Location: Limerick, Munster, Ireland
- Campus: Urban
- Nickname: MBWI
- Website: www.mwbi.ie

The Mid West Business Institute (MWBI), founded in 1988 and situated in Limerick, Ireland, was a third level business and technology college. It is now Griffith College Limerick.

== History ==
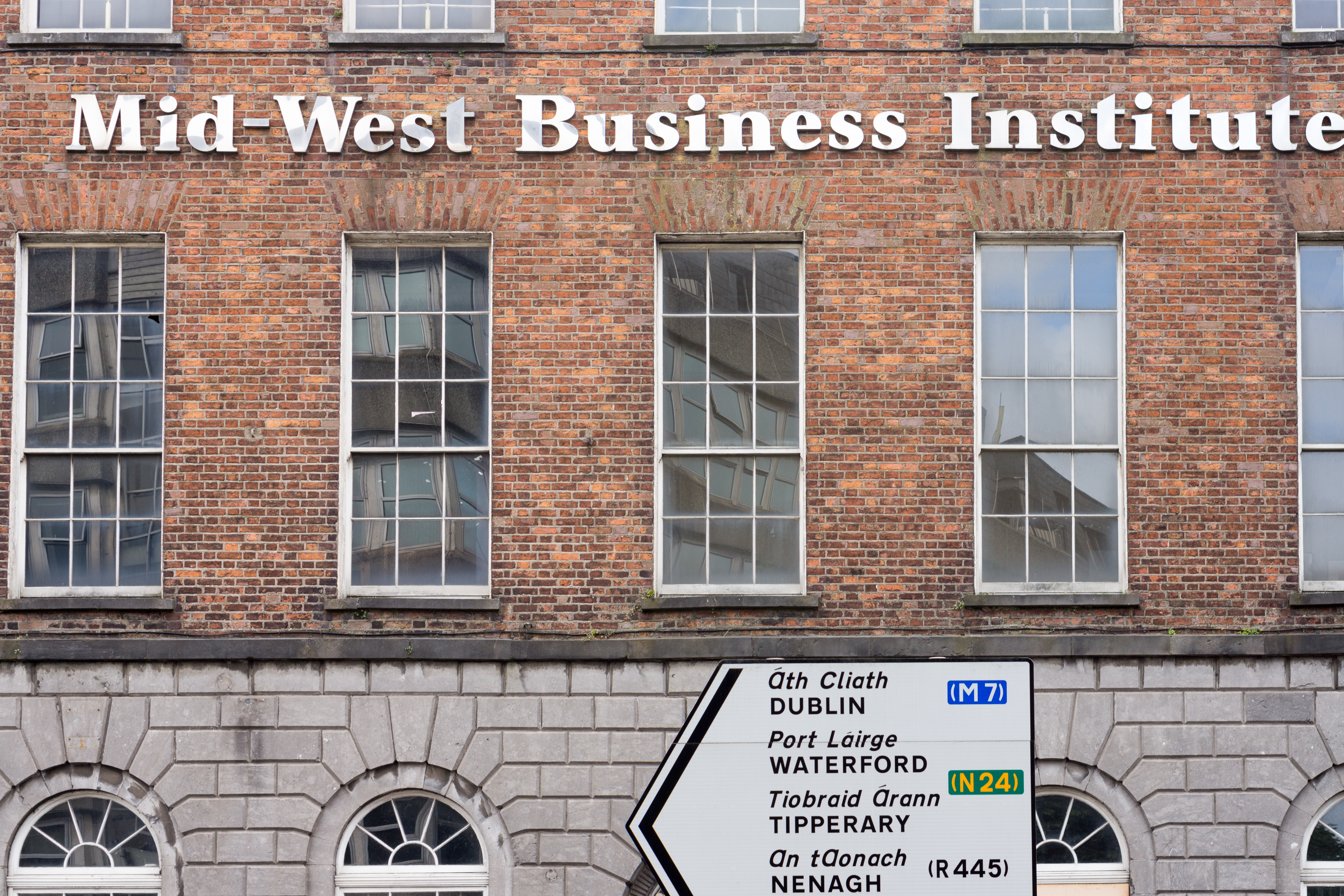
The Mid West Business Institute at the commercial buildings Limerick.

Originally located in Bruce House, when the MWBI moved to the Old Town Hall, Limerick, this was officially opened by Mr Des O’Malley T.D., the then Minister for Industry and Commerce, on 11 September 1992.

The institute delivered courses accredited by internationally recognised awarding bodies including the Higher Education and Training Awards Council (HETAC).

The MWBI also delivered courses validated by ICM, BTEC and CPID. There was also MBA programmes with the University of Surrey and also had associated programmes with Oxford Brookes University. The computing and IT degree and masters programmes led to qualifications with the NCC Education, University of Huddersfield and University of Portsmouth. The MWBI also ran professional accountancy programmes for the ACCA and IATI as well as professional bodies such as IPICS. It also had a number of foundation programmes for Institutes of Technology, such as the Limerick Institute of Technology and the Tralee Institute of Technology. The MWBI was the only private college to run engineering technician training courses, catering for the mechanical and electronic engineering business in the area.

In the mid 1990s the MWBI delivered in Limerick BA Hons Business Administration and BA Hons Business Studies franchised by Liverpool John Moores University

The Mid West Business Institute was a member of the Higher Education Colleges Association of Ireland.

In September 2006 Griffith College Limerick was founded with the acquisition of the Mid West Business Institute by Griffith College.

== Logos ==
The Mid West Business Institute had a few logs in its time, the Crest which included a Harp, the College motto Leading through learning as well as an impression of the Old Town Hall. Other logos used incorporated the Old Town Hall and either MWBI or Mid West Business Institute on it,.
