= Skerry's College =

Series of colleges for preparation for Civil Service examinations

Skerry's College crest

Skerry's College was a series of colleges which primarily prepared candidates for Civil Service examinations across the UK and Ireland.

== History ==
=== 1878–1885 ===
Skerry's College was inaugurated as a small training centre in Edinburgh in 1878 by George Skerry, a civil servant in Edinburgh who saw the need to prepare candidates for the new Civil Service examinations, resulting from the findings of the Royal Commission 1875, whereby entry to the Civil Service, Post Office or Custom and Excise, was to be by competitive examinations. It was the first college in the country to provide Civil Service training for young men seeking to enter H. M. Civil Service, and was an immediate success. It catered for training for Post Office positions, Customs-Excise Officerships and other Government posts.

For those applicants unable to attend classes in person, a system of correspondence tuition by post was developed in 1880. This again was an immediate success and formed an integral part of the College’s expanding empire and played a vital role in supplementing and cementing what was offered in the day and evening classes. To Skerry’s College belongs the distinction of being first in Britain to introduce correspondence tuition for examinations.

=== 1885–1930 ===
George Stewart, at first a partner of George Skerry, took over Skerry’s College entirely in 1885 when the College was only seven years old. Skerry, after severing his connection, settled in London. There are grounds for assuming that George Stewart was a man of vision, judgement and a driving force who ‘remained a firm believer in the freedom and initiative of the private school’.

Prior to the change of ownership, activities were confined to catering for the Civil Service; but, once it was consolidated, the College in the early 1890s embarked on a scheme of important extensions. It broadened its curricula to meet requirements of university and professional preliminaries, and inaugurated office training in shorthand and typewriting.

This office training course was considerably aided by certain inventions of office equipment such as the cyclostyle invented by David Gestetner in 1881; was paper for typewriting copies, introduced in 1888; and in 1899, the rotary method of copying introduced by Roneo.

In 1892, a preliminary examination for entrance to Scottish universities was constituted. The following year Skerry's opened its university department to provide preparation for this examination. Its curricula was also broadened to meet the requirements of school, professional and commercial examinations. This was made all the greater by the extension of correspondence to prepare students for university and other entrance examinations.

Such was the response to Skerry's College that similar facilities were gradually provided during this period in Glasgow, Newcastle and Liverpool with Glasgow eventually becoming the main centre. Thus it became possible for students throughout Britain to study by correspondence for entry to a wide range of careers.

These colleges, along with the development of the Correspondence College, contributed to the country as a whole, as well as overseas, which was to last until the latter part of the twentieth century.

=== 1930s ===
The keynote of the College was "Progress", and it kept abreast of the times by developing its courses of training and devising new methods to meet altering conditions. Repeated extensions in buildings, staff and equipment were made to cope with ever-increasing enrolments. In the late 1930s offices were opened in London and Aberdeen to deal with the large and growing volume of correspondence enrolments.

The College's eightieth birthday souvenir brochure records the events of Skerry’s College’s Diamond Jubilee in 1938. It brought together in Glasgow the principals and staff from all centres, and many friends. On the platform were principals and executives of the College, and ladies, Lord Provost Sir A. B. Swan, Sir Robert Wilson, I. J. Pitman (grandson of the inventor of Pitman's shorthand), R. M. Allardyce (Director of Education for Glasgow), Bailie Matthew Armstrong, John M. Jack, Rev. Dr. S. J. Ramsay Sibbald and Rev. Dr. W. S. Provand. The toast "Skerry’s College" was proposed by Sir Robert Wilson and replied to by Mr. George Stewart, eldest son of the late principal. The chairman, Mr. Arthur Stewart, proposed "our guests" and the reply was made by Mr. I. J. Pitman.

=== 1950s ===
After World War II came the need to re-adjust and develop.

Since World War II – in conditions of ‘overspill’ employment- there had been a considerable falling-off in the number of young people seeking admission to the services of the Crown.

In 1952, Mr. Arthur Stewart became sole proprietor and governor of Skerry’s. As part of re-organisation and expansion the governor, to ease accommodation at Liverpool, acquired an attractive building in Birkenhead standing on its own grounds; this was equipped and opened as Sherwood Grammar School. Six months later, to meet an even greater need at Newcastle, Claremont School, situated about ten minutes’ walk from the main building, was opened.

The success of the College has become more and more dependent on the quality of its tuition. It could not compete financially with the free education of the State but it aimed to provide a better service. The College adopted the slogan:: "You get BETTER tuition at Skerry’s" to highlight this.

While the chief goal of the colleges in Scotland had been preparation for Scottish universities and professional preliminary examinations, as well as commercial work, the main emphasis of the English colleges lay within the sphere of commercial and office training courses, with some preparatory and grammar school work alongside.

=== 1960s ===
The introduction of free state education and comprehensive schools, and the decline in the attractiveness of work in the Civil Service resulted in the decline and eventual closure of all Skerry’s Colleges in the UK. Voluntary Liquidation was completed by 3 June 1970.

== Locations ==
=== Edinburgh ===
In 1878 Skerry's College, Edinburgh, was founded mainly preparing candidates for Civil Service examinations, they also ran preliminary classes for university exams and also involved in distance learning as a correspondence college.

=== Glasgow ===
The suffragette and co-operative activist Margaret McCoubrey, a Labour councillor for Dock ward in Belfast, taught in the Skerry's Business Training College, Glasgow, where she became deputy head mistress at the age of twenty-four.

=== Dundee ===
The College in Dundee was located in Meadowside. Skerry's College was a recognised training institution in Scotland for Civil Service entrance examinations.

=== Liverpool ===
There was a Skerry's Commercial College in Rodney St. Liverpool.

=== Newcastle ===
There was a Skerry's College in Ellison Place, Newcastle upon Tyne.

=== London ===
There was a Skerry's Commercial College in Croydon, London.

The teacher and writer Thomas Evans Jacob (1853–1908) taught in Skerry's College London and produced a number of civil service exam texts.

=== Cork ===
Skerry's College, Cork.
- Former names: Skerry's Academy; Skerry's Business College; Skerry's School; Skerry's Civil Service & Commercial College
- Active: 1884–2005 (Merged with Griffith College)
- Affiliations: HETAC
- Location: Cork, Ireland
- Campus: Urban
- Nickname: Skerry's

Skerry's College Cork was founded in 1884 by George Skerry who was then a prominent mathematician and publisher of commercial arithmetic texts. Mr. Skerry had other colleges in St. Stephen's Green, Dublin, in Belfast and in Britain. The Cork college was the last surviving Skerry's College up to 2005. At the turn of the century, the College came under the ownership of a Mr. Collins of Sunday's Well, Cork, who was in charge until 1913, when it was taken over by one of Mr. Collins's teachers, Mr. Danny O' Sullivan. Mr. O' Sullivan later described his former Master as "an outstanding teacher of English and one of nature's gentlemen". Mr. O' Sullivan himself was described as a wonderful teacher, a great mathematician and a strict disciplinarian. At that time, Skerry's offered a special class for students studying for university matriculation and also specialised in bank courses for which a nomination was required. At that time, the banks only recruited male staff.

In 1943, Mr. McCarthy purchased the premises and goodwill of Skerry's. At that time he also had a shorthand and typewriting academy in Patrick Street. In 1944, that academy amalgamated with Skerry's. Mr. McCarthy was very committed to the College and did his utmost to secure employment for students. In 1947, the banks first started recruiting female clerks, for whom nominations were also required. The subjects for the Munster & Leinster Bank course at the time were: English, French, Arithmetic, Totting, Typewriting and Shorthand. Skerry's always secured numerous appointments with Munster and Leinster (AIB), Bank of Ireland and Cork Savings Bank (TSB). About this time also, the various County Councils began to hold competitive examinations for clerical shorthand/typists, and Skerry's students always secured the majority of the vacancies. These successes were printed in list form in the national daily newspapers. On Mr. McCarthy's death in 1962, his wife Gladys became governing director. Mrs. McCarthy maintained the tradition of Skerry's, viz. that of fulfilling the particular training requirements of modern day business. She introduced audio typing as a subject and invested in electric and golf-ball typewriters.

Skerry's/Griffith College Cork, Wellington House, St Patricks Hill, Cork

In 1977, Mrs. McCarthy retired and Messrs. Jeremiah J. Carey and Thomas Carey purchased the goodwill of the College and Mrs Patricia Carey became principal. The premises in South Mall was not for sale, so the directors purchased the building on St. Patrick's Hill which now houses the College. The Taoiseach Jack Lynch presided over the official opening of the new premises.

Any history of the College is incomplete without reference to Miss Iris Barry, whose name was synonymous with Skerry's. She joined the teaching staff of the College in 1935, and when she later became principal, she displayed tremendous inspiration, dedication and foresight, and was the driving force behind the College's success until her retirement in 1989, having completed a record service of 63 years.

Audrey McCarthy was the college director until June 2002 when the HSI Group based in Limerick purchased the business under the direction of chairman Mr. Michael McNamara and college director Mrs. Maria Horan.

In 1994, Skerry's College Cork was designated as an institution to which the Irish Governments National Council for Educational Awards (NCEA) Act, 1979. Skerry's began running Certificate, Higher Certificate and Degree courses validated by the NCEA, and subsequently its successor from 2001 onward the Higher Education and Training Awards Council (HETAC).

Skerry's Cork Business College was designated as a Computer Based Examination Provider for the ACCA Certified Accounting Technician (CAT) course.

Skerry's continued to run the office skills and secretarial courses for which it was famous but also a variety of other courses such as computing courses, European Computer Driving Licence (ECDL), payroll (SAGE), BTEC and Limperts Academy interior design courses and Pitman JEB ICT Teaching course.

Certain full-time undergraduate HETAC level 6 & 7 courses were also validated to receive tax relief under the Irish Government's 1997 Act. The courses included a Certificate in Intercultural Studies, Higher Certificate in Business, Higher Certificate in Business Computer Applications, and a BA in Marketing.

In February 2005, Griffith College acquired the business and goodwill, forming Griffith College Cork (incorporating Skerry's College). Griffith College Cork, incorporating Skerry's College, runs professional, undergraduate and postgraduate courses in Business, Law and Media & Journalism as well as a variety of short term evening courses in office skills, payroll, psychology and design.

=== Dublin ===
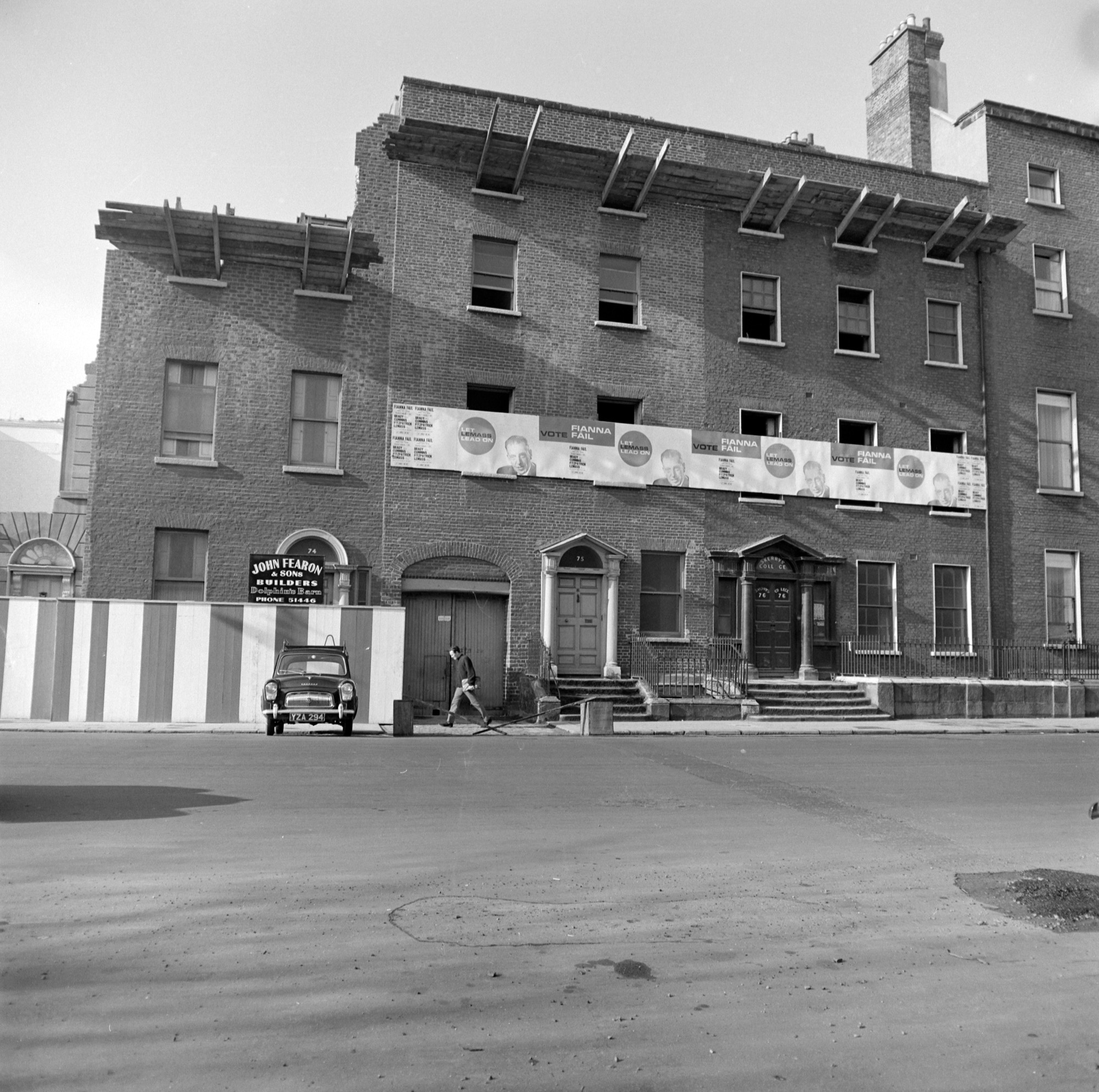
Skerry's College at 76 St Stephen's Green undergoing demolition in April 1965

There were other Skerry's Colleges in Ireland, in Skerry's Academy Dublin (Skerry's Civil Service & Commercial College, 76 St. Stephens Green and Skerry's School of Shorthand & Comm. Training, 10 Harcourt Street) which trained civil servants and clerks, and in Belfast (143 Royal Avenue). In the 1913 Telephone Directory, Skerry's School of Shorthand & Commercial Training is listed at 10 Harcourt Street, Dublin, as well as Skerry's Civil Service & Commercial College, at 76 St. Stephen's Green, Dublin

Skerry's is mentioned by James Joyce in Ulysses (Episode 18) "instead of sending her to Skerry's academy where shed have to learn". Milly would have attended the Harcourt Street branch, "shorthand, typewriting, and commercial college".

=== Derry ===
There was a branch of Skerry's College located at No. 4 Bayview Terrace in Derry. The 1918 Ulster Town Directory notes that the principal was a Mr. Archibald Halliday who occupied the building in c. 1911.

=== Belfast ===
In the 1913 Telephone Directory, Skerry's College (Ireland) Ltd., is listed in 143 Royal Avenue, Belfast.

=== Cardiff ===
Skerry's for a while had a College in Cardiff, Newport Rd Skerrys College Cardiff changed its name to King's College in the 1920s, and merged with Mockton House in 1994.

== Notable alumni ==
Skerry’s College alumni have several prominent members including the former Taoiseach, Jack Lynch, the former Tánaiste and Minister for Foreign Affairs, Peter Barry, and former South Kerry TD Breeda Moynihan-Cronin.

In 1919, Tom Barry famous for his role in the Irish War of Independence and book on the Flying Columns, enrolled in Skerry's College.

Joseph Cleary, British Labour MP and Lord Mayor of Liverpool, was educated at Skerry's College in Liverpool. Actor and musician Ozzie Yue attended Skerry's College in Rodney St, Liverpool.

Actor Barry Fitzgerald went to Skerry's College Dublin before going on to work in the Civil Service.

Icelandic politician, and a footballer with Rangers, Arsenal, AC Milan etc. Albert Gudmundsson studied at Skerry's College, Glasgow, from 1944 to 1946.

The British novelist Jack Common attended Skerry's College, Newcastle.
