= George Skerry =

British mathematician and educator

George Edward Skerry

George Edward Skerry (1856 – 23 August 1930) was a British educator, mathematician and publisher of commercial arithmetic texts.

Skerry was born in Charlton, Kent (now London), England, to George Skerry, a shipwright.

In 1878 Skerry's College, Edinburgh, was founded. Mainly preparing candidates for Civil Service Examinations, they also ran preliminary classes for university exams, and were also involved in distance learning as a correspondence college. Skerry also founded other colleges in Britain; in Liverpool, London, Newcastle upon Tyne and Glasgow.

In 1884 he founded Skerry's College, in Cork, Ireland, and also founded other colleges in St Stephen's Green, Dublin, and in Belfast. The Cork college was the longest-surviving, and celebrated its centenary in 1984. In 2005 it merged with Griffith College Dublin, forming Griffith College Cork.

== Publications ==
Books by George Skerry include:

- Practical Papers in Book-keeping.
- Practical Papers in Book-keeping, Adapted to the Requirements of Candidates for all Public Examinations and Commercial Life. (1899)
- Practical Indexing and Precis Writing. (1902)
- Skerry's advanced indexing and precis writing. (1910) G.E. Skerry & Co. (London)
- Graduated Exercises in Dictation.
- Skerry's Model Solutions in Advanced Arithmetic, Adapted to the Requirements of Canditates for All Public Examinations. G. E. Skerry & Co. (London)
