= ABRS Management and Technology Institute =

Hong Kong-based continuing education and training institute

Coordinates: 22°16′37.35″N 114°10′32.41″E

ABRS Management and Technology Institute is a Hong Kong–based continuing education and training institute. It was established in 1990 and has been registered with the Education Bureau since 1994. Over 20,000 students have attended courses offered by ABRS since it began operating.

== History ==
ABRS Management and Technology Institute is a Hong Kong–based continuing education and training institute that was established in 1990. It has been registered with the Education Bureau since 1994. Over 20,000 students in Hong Kong have attended courses offered by ABRS.

== Academics ==
ABRS offers courses preparing for a degree from the following UK institutions:

=== University of Greenwich ===
- Bachelor of Science (Hons) in Computing
- Bachelor (Hons) of Business Administration
- Bachelor of Arts (Hons) in Accounting and Finance
- Master of Science in Finance and Investment
- Master of Science in Information System Management

=== NCC Education ===
- Postgraduate Diploma in Strategic Business IT
- Institute of Administrative Management
  - Advanced Diploma

=== Institute for Management of Information Systems ===
- Advanced Diploma

== Partnerships ==
ABRS has established international networks, affiliations, or partnerships with universities, IT vendors, professional bodies, and testing organizations to deliver training, education, e-learning, certification testing, and examination services.

=== Professional Institutions ===
- Association of Certified and Chartered Accountants
- Association of International Accountants
- British Computer Society
- Hong Kong Institute of Accredited Accounting Technicians
- Institute of Administrative Management
- Institute for Certification of Computing Professionals
- Institute for Management of Information Systems
- NCC Education
- Project Management Institute

=== Universities ===
- Chinese Universities Extramural Department (1990–1994)
- Heriot-Watt University (2000–2005) BBA, MBA
- University of Greenwich: BSc (Hons) in Computing (since 2000), BA (Hons) Accounting and Finance (since 2004), BA (Hons) in Business Administration (since 2007), Master in Information Systems Management (since 2005), MSc in Finance and Investment Analysis (since 2009)
- University of Lincoln (1997–2002) BBA and BABIS
- University of Sydney Graduate School of Business / Australian Graduate School of Management (1995–2000) Advanced Certificate, Graduate Diploma, Master of Management, MBA
- University of Wollongong (2001–2004) Master of Information Technology Management and Master of Industry-Based IT
