= Htab =

Htab, htab and HTAB may refer to:

- Horizontal tab (a US-ASCII control character)
- Hash table
- HTAB, a Honeywell version of the programming language Filetab
