= Decision table =

Table specifying actions based on conditions

Play golf dataset
| Independent variables | | | | Dep. var |
| Outlook | Temperature | Humidity | Windy | Play |
|---|---|---|---|---|
| sunny | 85 | 85 | FALSE | Don't play |
| sunny | 80 | 90 | TRUE | Don't play |
| overcast | 83 | 78 | FALSE | Play |
| rain | 70 | 96 | FALSE | Play |
| rain | 68 | 80 | FALSE | Play |
| rain | 65 | 70 | TRUE | Don't play |
| overcast | 64 | 65 | TRUE | Play |
| sunny | 72 | 95 | FALSE | Don't play |
| sunny | 69 | 70 | FALSE | Play |
| rain | 75 | 80 | FALSE | Play |
| sunny | 75 | 70 | TRUE | Play |
| overcast | 72 | 90 | TRUE | Play |
| overcast | 81 | 75 | FALSE | Play |
| rain | 71 | 80 | TRUE | Don't play |

In business process modeling, decision tables are tabular representations for specifying which actions to perform depending on given conditions. Similar concepts are known as control table or state-transition table in software engineering and other fields, where they are usually defined as the transpose of decision tables.

== Overview ==
Each decision corresponds to a variable, relation or predicate whose possible values are listed among the condition alternatives. Each action is a procedure or operation to perform, and the entries specify whether (or in what order) the action is to be performed for the set of condition alternatives the entry corresponds to.

To make them more concise, many decision tables include in their condition alternatives a don't care symbol. This can be a hyphen or blank, although using a blank is discouraged as it may merely indicate that the decision table has not been finished. One of the uses of decision tables is to reveal conditions under which certain input factors are irrelevant on the actions to be taken, allowing these input tests to be skipped and thereby streamlining decision-making procedures.

Demonstration of “don’t care” symbol

| | | Rules | | | |
|---|---|---|---|---|---|
| Conditions | Feeling energetic? | Yes | No | Yes | No |
| Conditions | Is raining? | Yes | Yes | No | No |
| Actions | Stay inside | Maybe | Maybe | | |
| Actions | Go running | | | Maybe | |
| Actions | Tend the garden | | | Maybe | Maybe |

| | | Rules | | |
|---|---|---|---|---|
| Conditions | Feeling energetic? | — | Yes | No |
| Conditions | Is raining? | Yes | No | No |
| Actions | Stay inside | Maybe | | |
| Actions | Go running | | Maybe | |
| Actions | Tend the garden | | Maybe | Maybe |

The two tables convey identical information, but the second one uses a hyphen as a don't-care symbol for brevity.

Aside from the basic four quadrant structure, decision tables vary widely in the way the condition alternatives and action entries are represented. Some decision tables use simple true/false values to represent the alternatives to a condition (similar to if-then-else), other tables may use numbered alternatives (similar to switch-case), and some tables even use fuzzy logic or probabilistic representations for condition alternatives. In a similar way, action entries can simply represent whether an action is to be performed (check the actions to perform), or in more advanced decision tables, the sequencing of actions to perform (number the actions to perform).

A decision table is considered balanced or complete if it includes every possible combination of input variables. In other words, balanced decision tables prescribe an action in every situation where the input variables are provided.

== Example ==
The limited-entry decision table is the simplest to describe. The condition alternatives are simple Boolean values, and the action entries are check-marks, representing which of the actions in a given column are to be performed.

The following balanced decision table is an example in which a technical support company writes a decision table to enable technical support employees to efficiently diagnose printer problems based upon symptoms described to them over the phone from their clients.

Printer troubleshooter
| | | Rules | | | | | | | |
|---|---|---|---|---|---|---|---|---|---|
| Conditions | Printer prints | No | No | No | No | Yes | Yes | Yes | Yes |
| Conditions | A red light is flashing | Yes | Yes | No | No | Yes | Yes | No | No |
| Conditions | Printer is recognized by computer | No | Yes | No | Yes | No | Yes | No | Yes |
| Actions | Check the power cable | | | Maybe | | | | | — |
| Actions | Check the printer-computer cable | Maybe | | Maybe | | | | | — |
| Actions | Ensure printer software is installed | Maybe | | Maybe | | Maybe | | Maybe | — |
| Actions | Check/replace ink | Maybe | Maybe | | | | Maybe | | — |
| Actions | Check for paper jam | | Maybe | | Maybe | | | | — |

This is just a simple example, and it does not necessarily correspond to the reality of printer troubleshooting. Even so, it demonstrates how decision tables can scale to several conditions with many possibilities.

== Software engineering benefits ==
Decision tables, especially when coupled with the use of a domain-specific language, allow developers and policy experts to work from the same information, the decision tables themselves.

Tools to render nested if statements from traditional programming languages into decision tables can also be used as a debugging tool.

Decision tables have proven to be easier to understand and review than code, and have been used extensively and successfully to produce specifications for complex systems.

== History ==
In the 1960s and 1970s a range of "decision table based" languages such as Filetab were popular for business programming.

== Program embedded decision tables ==
Decision tables can be, and often are, embedded within computer programs and used to "drive" the logic of the program. A simple example might be a lookup table containing a range of possible input values and a function pointer to the section of code to process that input.

Static decision table
| Input | Function Pointer |
|---|---|
| "1" | Function 1 (initialize) |
| "2" | Function 2 (process 2) |
| "9" | Function 9 (terminate) |

== Control tables ==
Multiple conditions can be coded for in similar manner to encapsulate the entire program logic in the form of an "executable" decision table or control table. There may be several such tables in practice, operating at different levels and often linked to each other (either by pointers or an index value).

== Implementations ==
- Filetab, originally from the NCC
- DETAB/65, 1965, ACM
- FORTAB from Rand in 1962, designed to be imbedded in FORTRAN
- A Ruby implementation exists using MapReduce to find the correct actions based on specific input values.

== See also ==
- Decision trees
- Case based reasoning
- Cause–effect graph
- Dominance-based rough set approach
- DRAKON
- Karnaugh-Veitch diagram
- Many-valued logic
- Semantic decision table
- Decision Model and Notation
- Truth table
