= Diarmuid Hegarty =

Diarmuid Hegarty may refer to:

- Diarmuid Hegarty (academic), president of Griffith College Dublin
- Diarmuid O'Hegarty (1892–1958), member of the Irish Republican Army
