= DTPL =

DTPL may refer to:

- Datamax Ticket Printer Language, a page description language
- A version of the programming language Filetab
