= ABRS =

ABRS may refer to:

- ABRS Management & Technology Institute, a Hong Kong–based education institute
- ABS (TV station) a.k.a. ABRS, the Australian Broadcasting Corporation's TV station in Loxton, South Australia
- Acute bacterial rhinosinusitis
- Australian Biological Resources Study
