= Griffith College Dublin =

Private third-level college in Ireland

- Coláiste Uí Ghríofa, Baile Átha Cliath
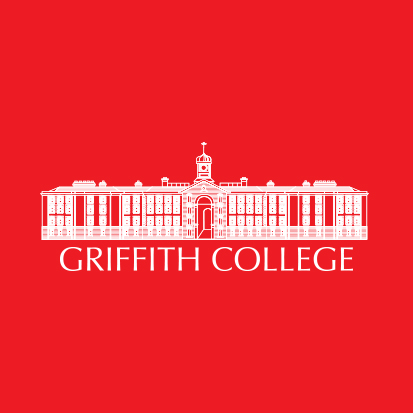
- Type: Private/Independent Higher Education College
- Established: 1974; 52 years ago
- Affiliations: QQI (previously HETAC), HECA, ACCA, King's Inns
- President: Diarmuid Hegarty
- Students: approaching 8,000
- Location: Dublin (also in Cork and Limerick), Ireland; 53°19′53″N 6°16′41″W
- Campus: Griffith College, Dublin 8 (and two other sites)
- Website: http://www.griffith.ie

Griffith College Dublin (GCD) (Irish: Coláiste Uí Ghríofa) is one of the longest-established private third level (higher education) colleges in Dublin, Ireland, and the largest such institution in the country. Begun as Business and Accounting Training in 1974, and having started to award degrees in 1990, it today has three campuses, one in Dublin, and one each in Cork and Limerick, the latter two based on acquisitions.

== Overview ==
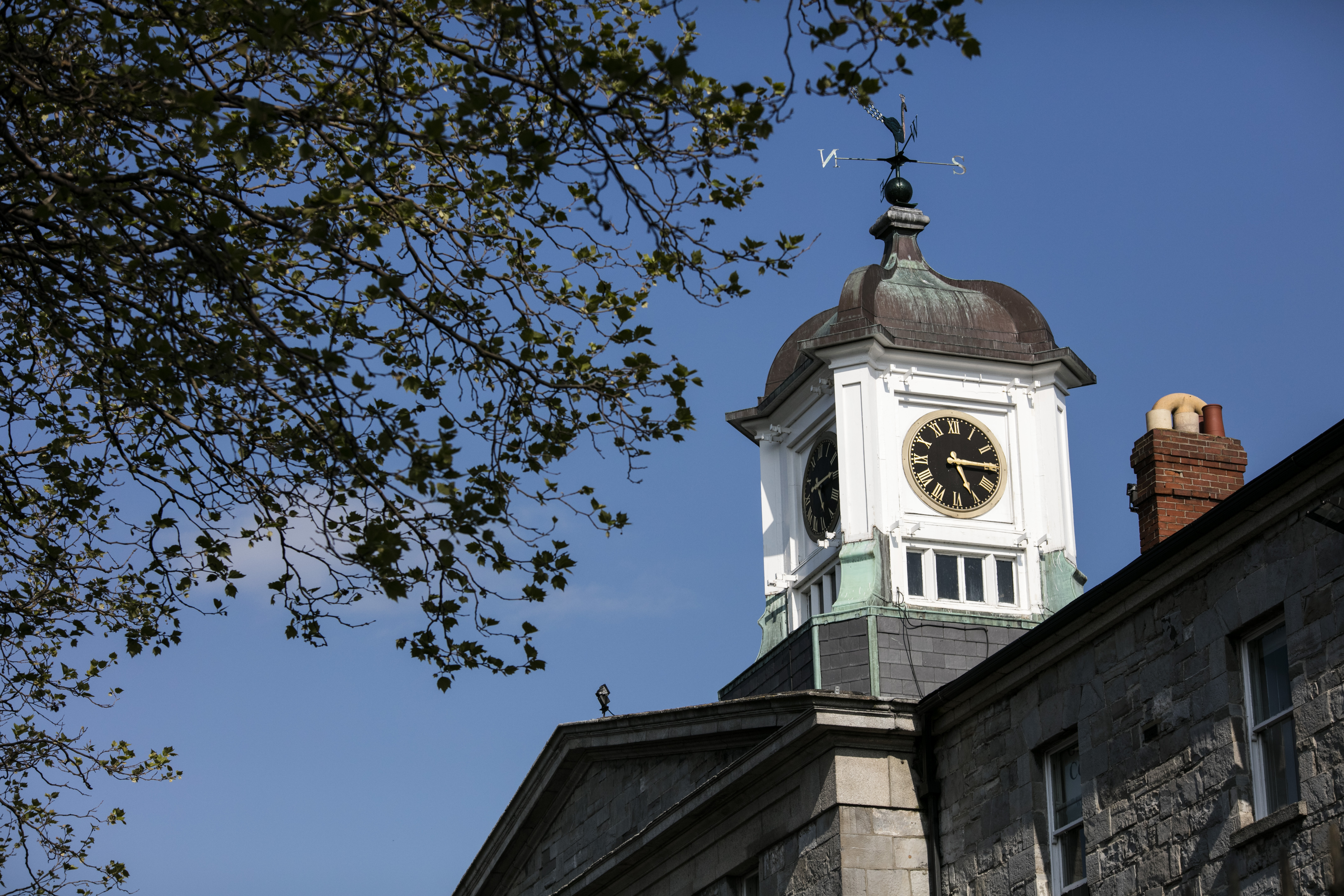
Griffith College Dublin Clock Tower

Griffith College is the largest private third-level institution in Ireland, with a student population of just under 8,000, including 1,400 overseas students from over 77 countries. It is named after its main campus, at the former Griffith Barracks on the South Circular Road in Dublin. The 7-acre Dublin campus is close to the city centre, where Griffith College has a small additional campus. Student Halls of Residence are located on the main campus, close to the library, creative studios, restaurant, gym facilities, and the Students Union.

Griffith College offers full and part-time degrees and other higher education qualifications in Law, Accountancy, Business, Computing, Journalism, Media, Creative Arts, Psychology, Design, Fashion, Music, and Drama. The college also offers professional accountancy programmes for Association of Chartered Certified Accountants (ACCA), ACA, CPA and IATI, Griffith College is a Gold Star CPA approved Educator. The ACCA has awarded the college its Platinum accreditation, its highest recognition level, and the college is also an ACCA CPD registered course provider.

The Griffith College Dublin campus is the home of the Leinster School of Music & Drama. Established in 1904, the Leinster School offers theory classes in Music and Drama to groups and individuals. The Leinster School is also an examining body and has a Theory Examinations Syllabus with levels from Preparatory to Grade 8.

== History ==
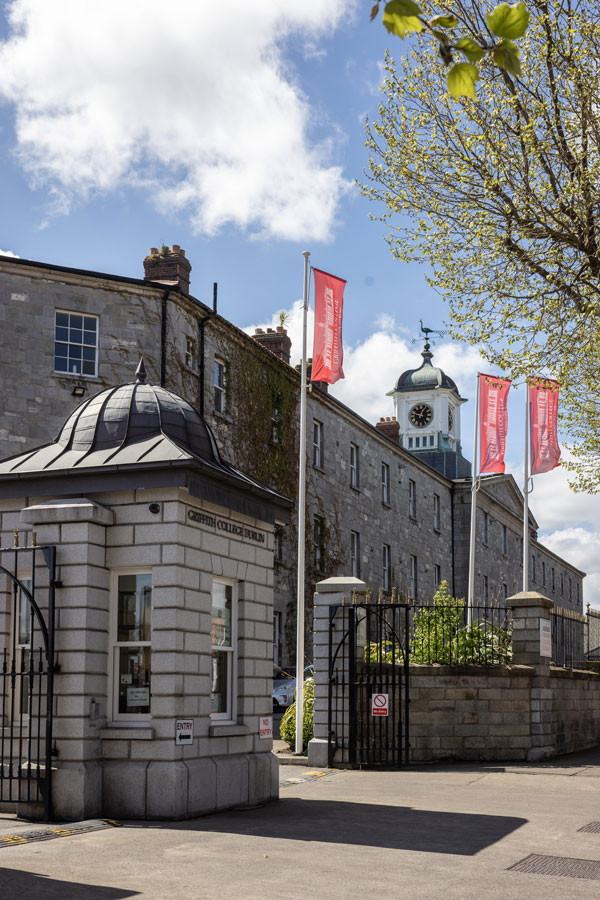
Front of Griffith College Dublin Campus

The college was established in 1974 by Diarmuid Hegarty and incorporated in 1978 as Business and Accounting Training (BAT). Originally located on Morehampton Road, in 1991, Business and Accounting College moved from Milltown Park, Ranelagh, to the Griffith Barracks site and changed its name to Griffith College Dublin. In 1979, Griffith College was designated as an institution under the Irish Government's National Council for Educational Awards (NCEA) Act.

In 1990, the first degree course was offered by Griffith College in Computer Science, validated by the University of Ulster. In 1992, it was followed by a Business Studies degree. This arrangement ceased in 1996 and degrees thereafter were validated by the Irish National Council for Educational Awards (NCEA), the predecessor of HETAC.

== Expansion and developments ==
Over the years Griffith College has expanded beyond its base in Dublin. Having previously established Professional Accountancy programmes in Cork in 2000, offering training in ACCA, CIMA, CPA, and IATI, Griffith College acquired Skerry's College Cork, operating since 1884, in 2005, forming Griffith College Cork.

In 2006 Griffith College opened in Limerick with the acquisition of the Mid West Business Institute, creating Griffith College Limerick. In 2009 Griffith College Limerick moved into new premises which were officially opened by the Minister of Defence Willie O'Dea T.D. on 23 January 2009.

In Spring 2013, Griffith College Cork expanded to a 5.3-acre campus on Wellington Road, Cork City, on the former site of St. Patrick's Hospital and Marymount Hospice. The Campus is called 'Griffith College Cork, Wellington Road Campus'. Teaching commenced at the Wellington Road campus in Summer 2013 with an English Language Residential School.

In 2024, Griffith College announced a €200m masterplan for its Dublin campus.

In January 2026, Griffith College Dublin sought planning permission from Dublin City Council for a multimillion-euro expansion featuring four new campus buildings.

=== Griffith College City Centre ===
Griffith College operated a city centre campus at 25 Wolfe Tone Street, off Mary Street, Dublin 1, from 2018 to June 2026.

== Faculties ==
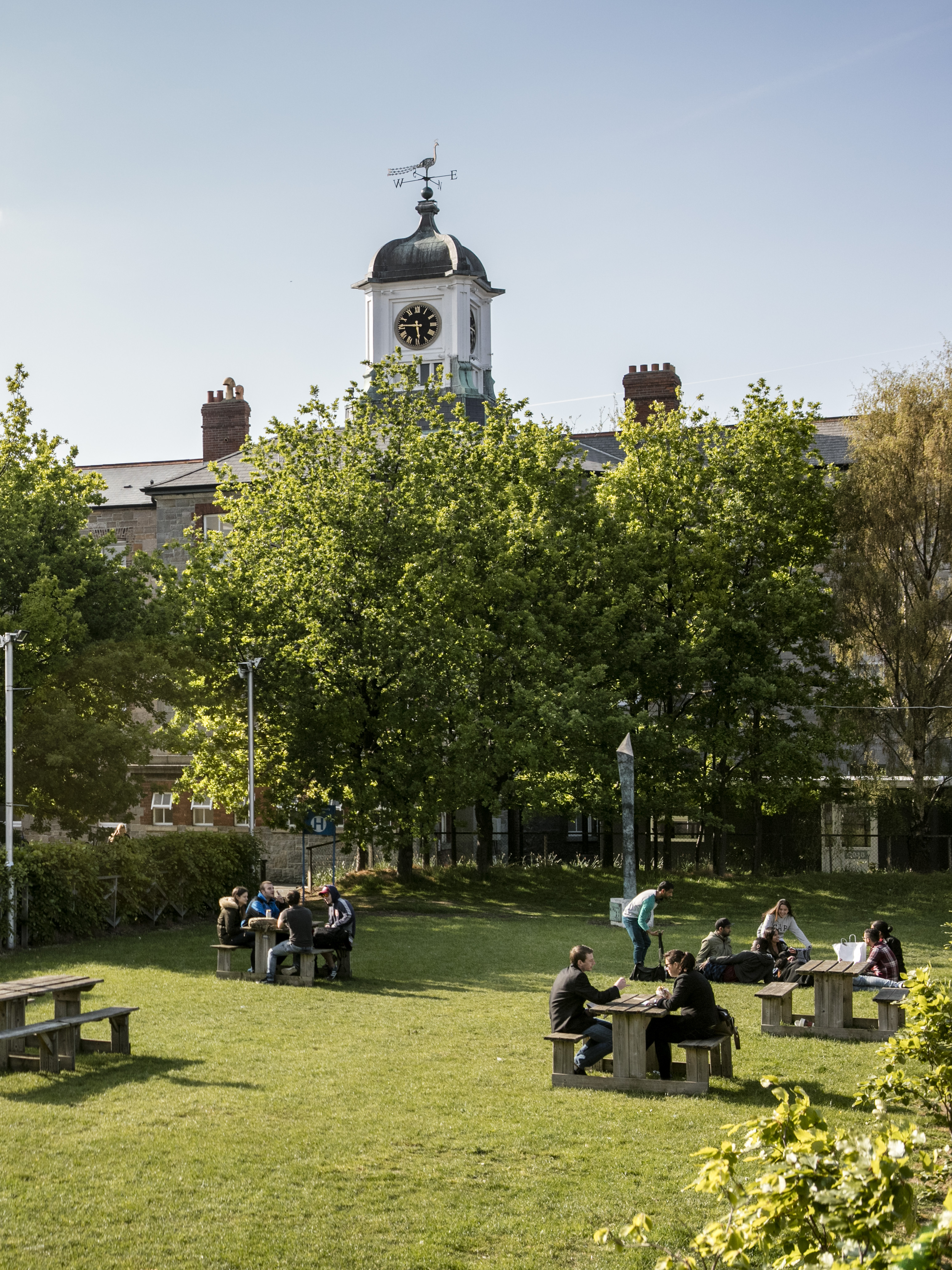
Griffith College Dublin Campus

The College is divided into a number of faculties and schools:

- Business (including the Graduate School of Business)
- Professional Accountancy
- Law (including the School of Professional Law)
- Pharmaceutical Science
- Computing
- Journalism & Media Communications
- The Leinster School of Music & Drama
- Griffith College Professional Academy
- Griffith Institute of Language
- Design
- Creative Arts & Screen Media
- Teaching & Learner
- Psychology
- Counselling & Psychotherapy (ICHAS)
- Engineering
- Music & Multimedia (Pulse)
- Springboard+

=== Faculty of Law & the Professional Law School ===
Griffith College Dublin is home to one of Ireland's largest law schools, incorporating the Undergraduate, Postgraduate and Professional Law Schools.

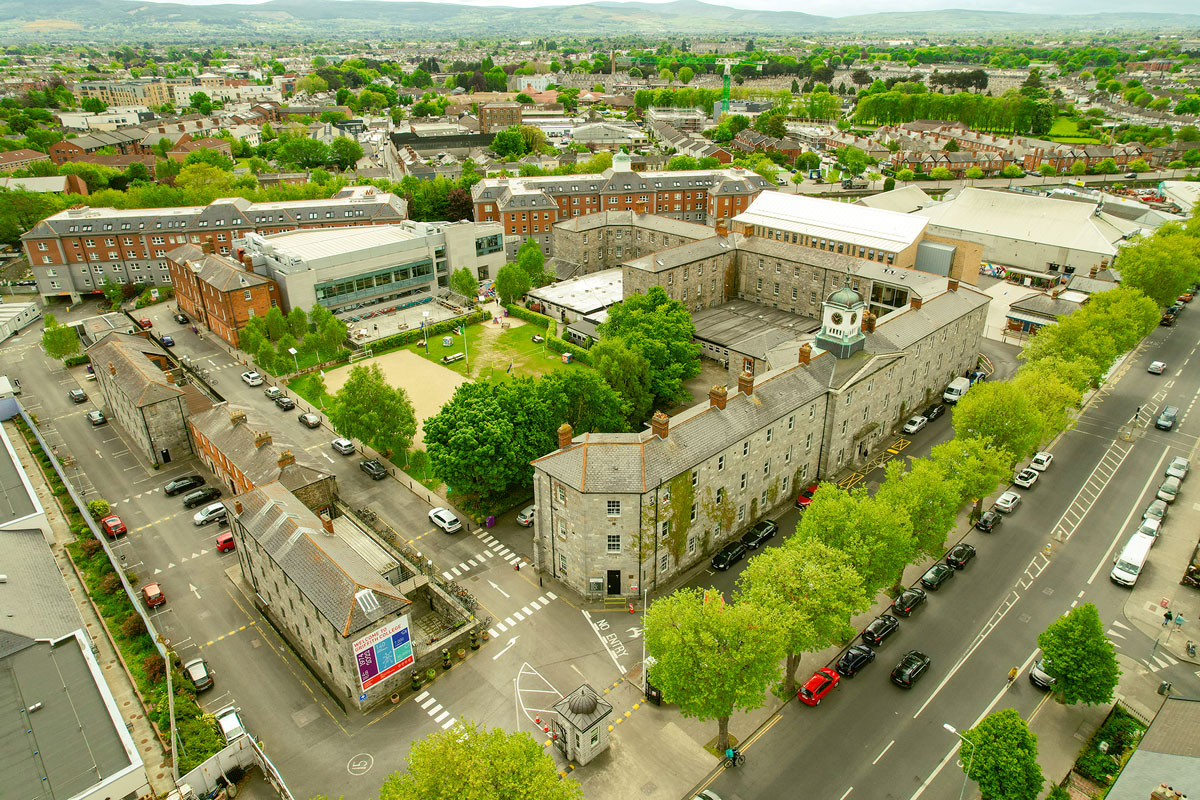
Aerial view of Griffith College Dublin campus

==== Innocence Project ====
In September 2009, David Langwallner, then Dean of Law, founded the Irish Innocence Project at Griffith College.

The Irish Innocence Project reviews claims of wrongful conviction and miscarriages of justice in Ireland. It is based on the famous Innocence Project in the USA.

The Irish Innocence Project (Irish: Tionscadal Neamhchiontachta na hÉireann) was launched officially by Dr.Greg Hampikian, director of the Idaho Innocence Project and DNA expert for the Georgia Innocence Project in March 2010.

In January 2010, Tipperary man Harry Gleeson became the first recipient of a posthumous pardon from the State. He was cleared decades after the crime took place in a dramatic development representing the dedicated work of the Griffith College-based Irish Innocence Project and the Justice for Harry Gleeson group.

=== School of Professional Accountancy ===
Griffith College works with several local and international partners to offer professional courses in areas of accounting.

==== Association of Chartered Certified Accountants ====
Griffith College holds a platinum status Association of Chartered Certified Accountants (ACCA) accreditation, and offers courses in the following areas:

- ACCA (Association of Chartered Certified Accountants)
- ACCA - Computer Based Exams
- ACCA Diploma in Accounting & Business

==== Certified Public Accountants ====
Griffith College is also a Goldstar CPA Approved Educator, offering Certified Public Accountant (CPA) certification and preparation programmes. These include:

- CPA (Certified Public Accountants)
- CPA - Computer Based Exams
- CPA -Certificate in Business & Accounting
- CPA Certified Tax Adviser (CTax)

==== Accounting Technicians Ireland ====
Griffith College is a licensed college provider by Accounting Technicians Ireland (ATI) and offers an ATI membership qualification course.

== Collaborations and recognition ==
At an international level, Griffith College Dublin is a participant in the Erasmus / Socrates mobility programmes.

Ireland is a member of the Bologna Process, of which Griffith College is a promoter. The generic outcomes for Irish degrees are laid out in the National Framework of Qualifications. In 2006, Ireland became the first country to verify the compatibility of its national framework with the overarching framework of qualifications for the European Higher Education Area (EHEA) and Griffith College’s degree programmes adhere to this framework.

== Validating partners ==
Griffith College works in partnership with a number of validating bodies in Ireland and the UK. This ensures that all programmes are recognised nationally and internationally.

=== QQI validation ===
QQI is the awarding body for Irish higher education and training institutions outside the university sector.

=== King's Inns Recognition ===
In 2004, Griffith became the first independent college in the country to have its degrees (LLB and BA in Business & Law) recognised by the Honourable Society of King's Inns. for the purposes of admission to its annual entrance examinations. Having successfully completed these five examinations, students may then complete the Barrister of Law degree in one year. which is a professional qualification for practice at the bar.

== Student life ==
=== Halls of Residence ===
Griffith Halls of Residence (GHR) is a student accommodation facility associated with Griffith College, located on South Circular Road, Dublin 8. It serves students from multiple educational institutions across Dublin; both domestic and international students. Overlooking Dublin's Grand Canal, Griffith College’s Dublin campus is over 200 years old, and was originally known as the Richmond Bridewell. In 2013, a statue was unveiled by then Taoiseach Enda Kenny TD to mark the campus’s 200th anniversary, along with the publication of a history book.

=== Griff FM ===
Griff FM was a radio station that students from the Journalism & Media Faculty operated from the main Dublin campus. The radio station was licensed by the BAI (and the BCI before that) to broadcast for a couple of weeks. The station aired news and music-oriented programmes produced and presented by second-year journalism degree students and postgraduate journalism students.

=== Students' Union ===
Griffith College Students' Union is the representative body for all full-time and part-time Griffith College students. The Students' Union executives include the roles of president and (as of 2021) two vice-presidents. The union organises a number of trips and events throughout the academic year, including Freshers Week and several balls. It also helps fund and assist college clubs and societies covering activities such as sport, music, debating, and film.

Griffith College Dublin's debating society were team winners of the 2009 Thomas Finlay Court Moot Competition in UCD.

=== College and student publications ===
There are a number of Griffith College student publications. These include an online newspaper called The Circular, curated by Journalism students, where examples of student work are published. In April 2025, students from Griffith College Dublin won three major awards at the National Student Media Awards (SMEDIAS), Ireland’s premier annual student journalism competition. They received awards for Small College or Society Publication of the Year, awarded to the editorial team of Dublin 8 Magazine, Journalism Relating to Health, and Journalist of the Year – National Media awarded to Bartira da Silva Augelli for her broader reporting in national media.

=== Events ===
An annual "Creative Week" features the final work of a collective of students from various courses in the College. It takes place to showcase student work of the creative disciplines, Interior Design, Interior Architecture, Fashion Design, TV & Video Production, Photography, Digital Media, Sound Engineering, Journalism, and Visual Media.

== Facilities and services ==
The college facilities include a library, common room, computer laboratories, CAD lab, photography lab, fitness room, sound studios, shop, and restaurant. The college also offers students a career advice service. There is also counselling for personal and non-academic issues.

The college library provides research and study facilities to students (and to college alumni), it holds a range of set course texts and background reading material for all college programmes.

== GBS Research Hub ==
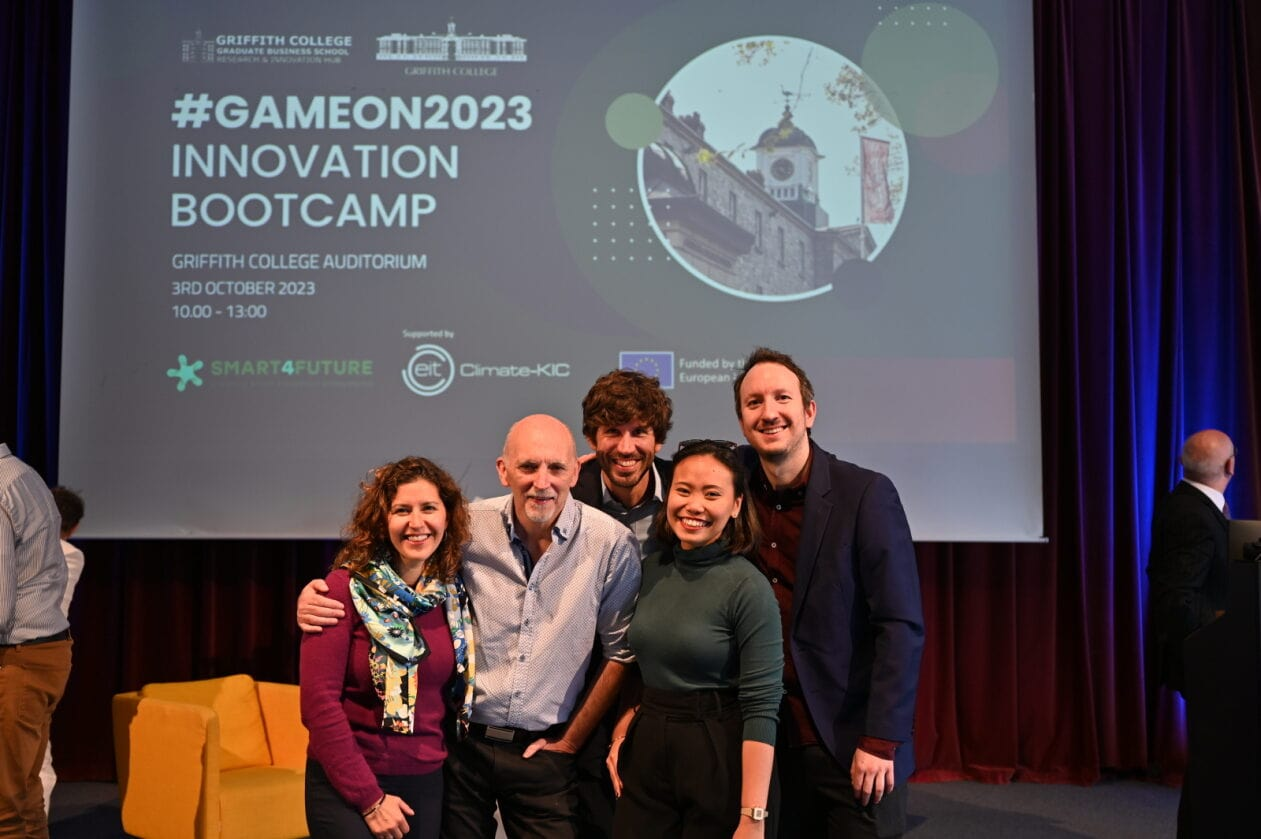
GBS Innovation Hub at Griffith College Dublin

The Research and Innovation Hub at Griffith College Dublin, also known as the GBS Hub, was founded in 2023 and serves as the institution's EU research and innovation centre. It aims to bridge the gap between education and industry by fostering entrepreneurship through consulting services, mentorship, and dynamic collaborations.

The Hub focuses on areas such as artificial intelligence, sustainability, and healthcare, actively supporting businesses with growth potential. As part of the EU-funded SMART4FUTURE project, the Hub has successfully supported nine start-up companies and three student entrepreneurs through funded research.

The GBS Hub organises annual boot camps and competitions to encourage innovation and entrepreneurship among students and staff. As part of the SMART4FUTURE project, the GBS Hub boot camp provided €15,000 in EU funding to support student-led companies. The boot camps offered hands-on support, practical tools, and mentorship to transform ideas into actionable solutions, serving as a springboard for potential dissertation topics or industry-based research.

== Conference centre ==
Griffith Conference Centre is located on the college campus. The facilities include a 600+ seated auditorium, smaller suites and rooms for hire. The buildings were officially opened by then Taoiseach Bertie Ahern in September 2006. The Conference Centre has been used for various functions such as conventions of political parties, medical bodies, and industry groups. It has also hosted television programmes such as the You're a Star auditions.

== GC50 ==
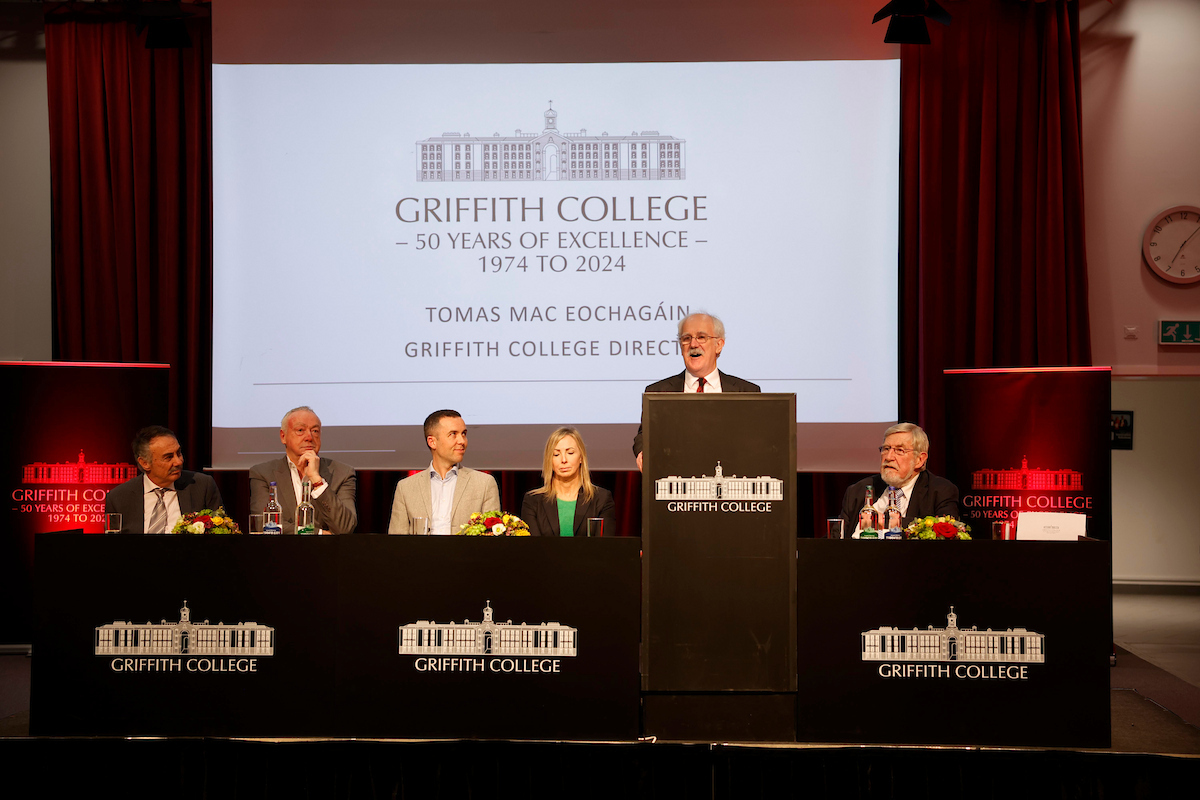
GC50 Prizewinners Booklet Launch at Griffith College Dublin .

Griffith College celebrated its 50th anniversary in 2024. To mark this important milestone, the College held a number of events and initiatives throughout the year.

=== GC50 Launch Event ===
On 1 February 2024, Griffith College welcomed Simon Harris T.D., Minister for Further and Higher Education, Research, Innovation and Science, to speak alongside Professor Diarmuid Hegarty, Griffith College President and Founder.

=== GC50 Conversations: Family Amendment Referendum: Yes or No? ===
On Monday, 4 March 2024, the College welcomed Ivana Bacik, TD and Labour party leader, and Michael McDowell, Independent Senator and former Attorney General, to debate the Family Amendment Referendum, which was subsequently held on 8 March 2024.

=== Restoration of the historic Quarter Master House ===
Built circa 1890, the Quarter Master House, a detached three-bay, two-storey red brick building, was most likely constructed following the conversion of the old Richmond Bridewell into Wellington Barracks. To mark GC50, the college undertook significant sustainability and restoration efforts on this iconic structure, bringing it back to its original splendour.

=== Prize Winners Booklet Launch ===
The Prize Winners Booklet is a legacy project highlighting the prestigious external awards earned by the college’s alumni and showcasing their national and international success. At the Prize Winners Booklet Launch on 24 January 2025, over 1,000 awards were celebrated and cemented in Griffith College's history.

== Notable staff and alumni ==
- Cecelia Ahern, author, is a Journalism graduate from Griffith College.
- Michael Conlan, Irish Olympian and professional boxer, attended the college.
- Helen McEntee, Fine Gael TD and Minister for European Affairs, studied Journalism and Media Communications at Griffith.
- Emmet McNamara, who won the 2020 Epsom Derby on Serpentine, graduated from the Accounting and Finance program in 2018.
- Seán O'Brien, Seán Cronin, Fergus McFadden and Jordan Larmour, all Ireland national rugby union team members, attended the college.
- Mark Vaughan, Dublin Gaelic footballer, also studied at Griffith College.
- Maria Walsh, Media and Journalism graduate (2009), won the Rose of Tralee festival in 2014 and was elected as a Member of the European Parliament in 2019.
- Laura Whitmore, graduate of the LSMD at Griffith College, is a TV Personality and MTV Presenter
- Laura Woods, RTÉ announcer, is also a Journalism graduate.

== Buildings ==
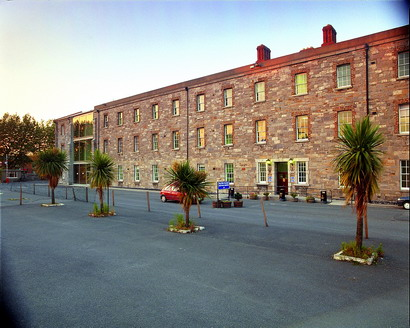
Arthur Griffith Building

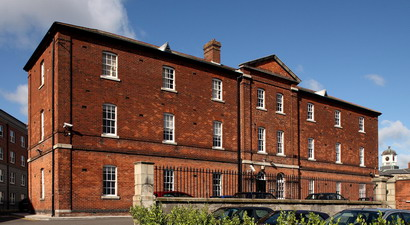
Wellington Building

- Daniel O'Connell building – North Wing, Innocence Project, Griffith College Professional Academy, School of Professional Accountancy, accounts office, careers office, admissions office, student activities office, learning support office, learner engagement office, wellbeing support, Healthcare Apprenticeship department, Journalism Faculty, Business Faculty, Engineering Department, Law Faculty, Digital Learning, Academic Support Services.
- Arthur Griffith building – West Wing, Sewing Room, Fashion Room, Lecture Rooms, Reception, Graduate Business School, Student Lockers, Library.
- Meagher building – houses the Griffith College Students Union
- James Stephens building – Computer Labs, Project Room.
- Richmond building – Photography Dark Rooms, Radio Studio, Media Publications Suite, E-Learning Suite, Off Air Radio Training Room.
- Wellington building – IT Office, Computer Labs, Printing Centre, Computing Faculty.
- Stables – Video Editing Studios, Photography Studios.
- Academic Facilities building – Restaurant, Auditorium, International Office, Conference Centre, School of Professional Accountancy.

== Graduations ==
The college graduation ceremonies take place over two days each November in the Conference Centre. In previous years the ceremony took place in Royal Hospital Kilmainham in 2004 and 2005, and St. Patrick's Cathedral, Dublin the year before that.

In attendance are graduates with their families and friends, representatives of Validation Bodies, as well as political and diplomatic dignitaries. Griffith college also presents a Distinguished Fellowship Award, which has been conferred on figures including John Hume, Joe Schmidt and Seamus Heaney.

== Honorary Awards ==
Griffith College annually presents honorary awards, such as the Distinguished Fellowship or Distinguished Graduate Awards, to individuals who have made significant contributions nationally or internationally. Recent honourees include:

Joe Duffy (2025): Retired radio and TV broadcaster, honoured in recognition of his outstanding contribution to Irish public service broadcasting.

Rachael Blackmore (2025): Grand National and Cheltenham Gold Cup–winning jockey, honoured in recognition of her outstanding contribution to Irish sport.

Peter O’Mahony (2025): Former Munster and Ireland rugby captain, honoured in recognition of his outstanding contribution to Irish sport.

To view previous award winners, visit the Griffith College Honorary Awards page.
