= Robert Cockburn (physicist) =

British government scientist

Sir Robert Cockburn KBE CB
- Cockburn in 1954
- Born: 31 March 1909; Portsmouth, England
- Died: 21 March 1994 (aged 84); Aldershot, England
- Known for: Physicist and electronic countermeasure expert
- Awards: Knight Commander of the Order of the British Empire; Companion of the Order of the Bath; Medal for Merit (US)

Sir Robert Cockburn KBE CB (/ˈkoʊbərn/ KOH-bərn; 31 March 1909 – 21 March 1994) was a British government scientist who played an important role in the field of electronic countermeasures for the RAF in the defence of Britain during the Second World War and later became Director of the Royal Aircraft Establishment and Chief Scientist at the Ministry of Aviation.

== Education ==
Born in Portsmouth, Cockburn was educated at Southern Secondary School for Boys and Portsmouth Municipal College. He studied at the University of London while working as a science teacher at the West Ham Municipal College, and completed his PhD in 1939.

== Royal Aircraft Establishment ==
In 1937 Cockburn took up a research post at the Royal Aircraft Establishment, Farnborough, a part of the Air Ministry. Here he worked on the ground-to-air VHF communication system that was used to good effect by RAF Fighter Command during the Battle of Britain.

== Radio Countermeasures ==
In 1940, Cockburn was assigned to the Telecommunications Research Establishment near Swanage, where he set up and headed a team to work on radio countermeasures - the Battle of the Beams. Jamming the German navigation beams reduced the devastation caused by their heavy bombing raids during the Blitz, and his team also developed many devices to fool or jam enemy radar, which greatly reduced the losses sustained by Royal Air Force bombers in the offensive stages of the war.

He was responsible for the development of the Jostle IV radio jammer - the most powerful jammer device used over Europe. At 2 kW output it could block all VHF transmissions over 32-48 MHz. However, enclosed in its own pressurised container, (to prevent arcing of the high voltages inside), it was large and took up the entirety of the bomb bay of the Boeing Fortresses used by No. 100 Group RAF. Due to the high transmitter power, test flights had to be carried out in the vicinity of Iceland, otherwise the jamming would have blanked out all frequencies in the specified range over a large area, as well as giving the Germans warning of the impending arrival of a jamming system.

== Window ==
As the Germans developed their own technologies, Cockburn expanded his team, first at Swanage and later at Malvern, with a view to hiding British bombers from German radar. One of the principal weapons for this purpose was Window, known to the Americans as Chaff, small bundles of metal strips which could cause a radar echo similar to that of a bomber aircraft.

Window was such an important innovation that many opposed its use by RAF Bomber Command, because of the potential consequences if the Germans used similar techniques against British radar. Bomber Command was finally allowed to use Window for the first time on 24–25 July 1943, in the big raid on Hamburg, leading to a significant reduction in RAF casualties.

In the lead up to the Normandy landings of 6 June 1944, Cockburn worked with Leonard Cheshire and others on Operations Taxable and Glimmer. These operations were designed to create an elaborate system of electronic signals that, while using only two squadrons of bombers dropping bundles of Window, would suggest that invasion fleets were heading towards Fecamp and Calais, well to the east of the actual landings.

== Postwar ==
In 1945 Cockburn joined the Atomic Energy Research Establishment (AERE) at Harwell, but in 1948 he returned to his air interests as scientific adviser to the Air Ministry. He went on to become controller of guided weapons at the Ministry of Supply (MoS), and was chief scientist at the Ministry of Aviation between 1959-1964.

His last official post saw him return to the Royal Aircraft Establishment. His first period there had been as a researcher, but he returned as director of the establishment between 1964-1969.

Although he retired from the civil service in 1969, he served as the chairman of the National Computing Centre between 1970-77. He was also the chairman of the Television Advisory Committee for Posts and Telecommunications between 1971–73, and of the BBC Engineering Advisory Committee between 1973-81.

On 14 August 1959, Cockburn officially opened Roke Manor Electronic Research Laboratories in Romsey, which continued to develop innovative research in the fields of radio countermeasures.

== Awards ==
Cockburn was awarded the OBE in 1946 New Year Honours and, in 1947, the US Medal for Merit, the highest honour for war service that can be offered to any civilian. In the 1953 Coronation Honours he was appointed a Companion of the Order of the Bath (CB), and he received a knighthood in 1960.

== Personal ==
Cockburn married Phyllis Hoyland in 1935 - they had two daughters. He was friendly with C. P. Snow, and the character of Walter Luke in the Strangers and Brothers series of novels is partially based on him.

RV Jones, who had worked with Robert Cockburn at the start of his career, wrote his obituary in the 'Independent' and summed him up as follows "As a colleague he was generous, recognising that 'across the havoc of war' there was sometimes merit on the other side, be that side German or opponents in Whitehall; and he was an unfailing source of provocative ideas to challenge conventional wisdom."

His main hobby was sailing; he had picked up a love of the sea from his father, who served with the Royal Navy for many years. Following his retirement he pursued his interest in sculpture.

He was a senior research fellow at Churchill College, Cambridge between 1970–77, and his papers are held by the college.

=== Lectures ===
In 1967 he was invited to deliver the 56th Wilbur and Orville Wright Memorial Lecture 'A New Phase in Aviation?'.

== See also ==
- Telecommunications Research Establishment
- National Computing Centre
- Green Cheese (missile)
