= Diarmuid Hegarty (academic) =

President of Griffith College Ireland

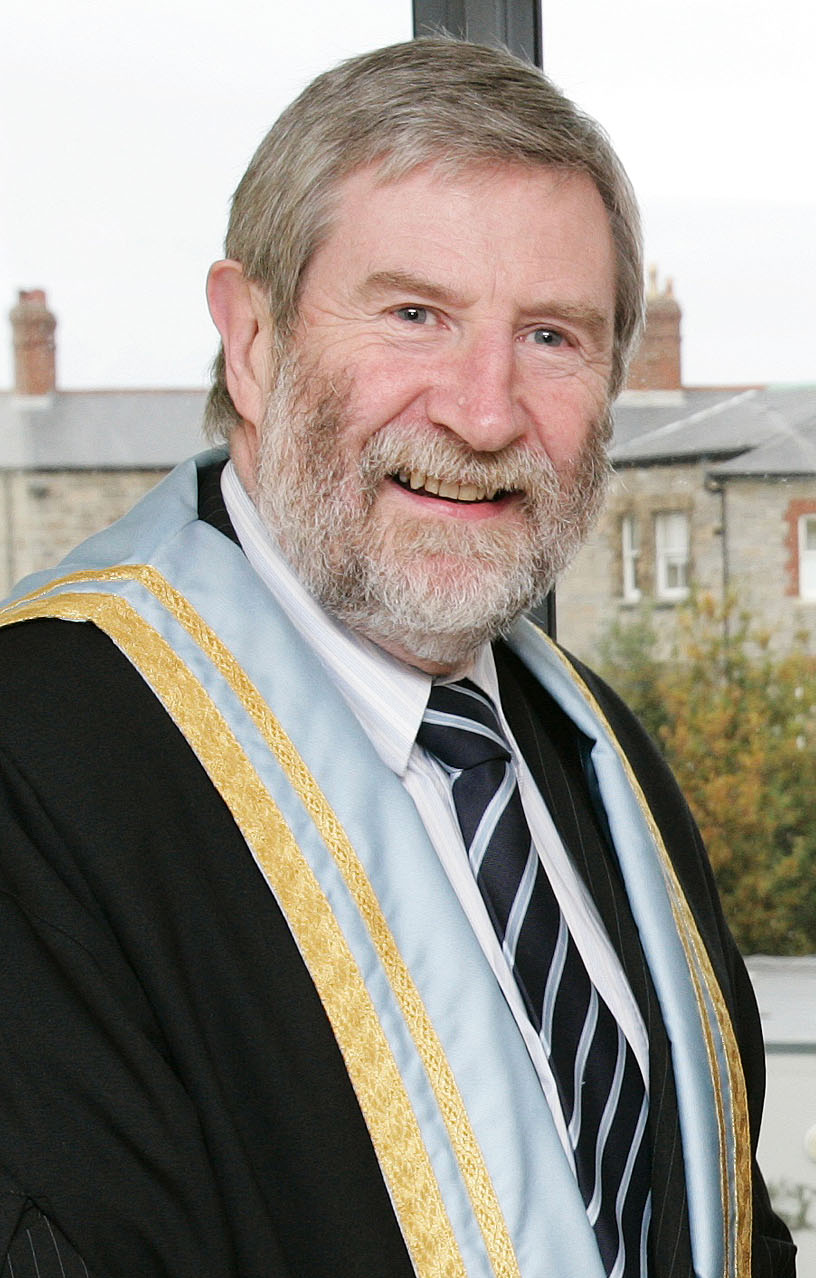
- Hegarty in 2007
- Born: Dublin

Academic background
- Education: University College Dublin (BComm); Honourable Society of King's Inns (Barrister at Law)

Academic work
- Discipline: Higher Education, Commerce and Law
- Institutions: Griffith College

Diarmuid Hegarty is the president of Griffith College in Ireland. He is also chairman of the Friends of the Vocal Arts.

== Early life and education ==
Diarmuid Hegarty was born in Dublin. He studied Commerce (BComm) at University College Dublin and obtained a Barrister at Law (BL) degree from the Honorable Society of King's Inns.

From 1969 to 1973, he trained to be an accountant with Coopers and Lybrand.

Hegarty is a Barrister-at-Law and a Fellow of the Institute of Chartered Accountants in Ireland.

== Career ==
In 1974, Hegarty became a Taxation Consultant with constituent firm of Deloitte and Touche. That same year, Hegarty founded Business and Accounting Training, which grew into Griffith College Ireland. The college operated from Milltown, St. Stephen's Green and Morehampton Road, Dublin, In 1978, BAT college was incorporated. The name was changed to Griffith College when the college moved to the former Griffith Barracks in 1991.

In 1992, he became president of Griffith College Ireland. From 1999 to 2006, he served as a board member of Griffith College Karachi. As president of Griffith College, Hegarty has been involved in promoting the Bologna Process for a Europe-wide Higher Education Network.

In 2018 he was elected to the Council of Dublin Chamber of Commerce.

== Selected roles ==
- 2011: Chairman of the Higher Education Colleges Association (HECA),
- 2012: Received an Honorary Professorship from the Beijing Information Science & Technology University (BISTU) in China and was made an Honorary Member of the University's academic board
- 2018 - Elected as a Council Member to Dublin Chamber of Commerce
- Chairman of the Las Adelfas Hotel partnership, in which he has a business interest.
- Vice-Chairman of the Ireland-Pakistan Business Council.
