= Irish Institute of Legal Executives =

The Irish Institute of Legal Executives (IILEX)
- Instiúid Feidhmeannaigh Dlí na hÉireann
- Abbreviation: IILEX
- Formation: Ireland (1987)
- Type: Irish Representative body
- Purpose: Represent Legal Executives, and provide Training and Education.
- Location: Dublin, Ireland
- Region served: Ireland
- President: Deirdre Littrean-Butler
- Website: https://www.iilex.ie/

The Irish Institute of Legal Executives (Irish: Instiúid Feidhmeannaigh Dlí na hÉireann) was formed in 1987, incorporated in 1992. It consists of and is the representative body for legal executives in Ireland. The aim of the institute is to provide a system of training and examination and to obtain a recognised professional qualification for those engaged in legal work. There are similar Legal Executive positions and representative bodies in Australia, New Zealand and in the UK.

== Membership ==
As well as full membership for those employed as legal executives, formerly managing clerks, there is fellowship, associate membership and student membership available to those with and studying in Accredited Professional Legal Studies. IILEX members can become Commissioners for Oaths.

- Senior Legal Executive Member (S.I.I.L.Ex.)
- Legal Executive Member (M.I.I.L.Ex.)
- Associate Member (A.I.I.L.Ex.)
- Student Legal Executive Member

== Diploma in Professional Legal Studies ==
IILEx recognises the Diploma in Legal Studies and Practice offered by Griffith College. The Diploma may be taken at either the Dublin or Cork campuses of Griffith College. Students may attend lectures in person or online. On successful completion of the Diploma, graduates may apply to become Associate Members of IILEx. Each year the Frank Crummey Perpetual Trophy is awarded to the student with the best academic results on the Diploma.
