= Griffith College Cork =

Private third-level institution in Cork, Ireland

- Coláiste Uí Ghríofa, Corcaigh
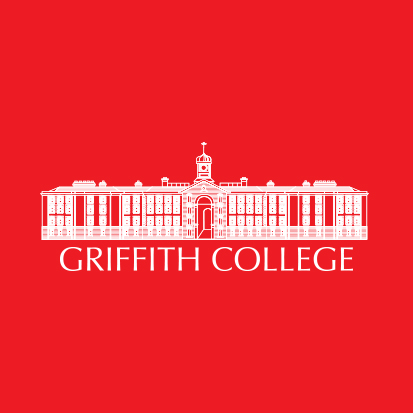
- Griffith College logo
- Former names: Skerry's College Cork, Skerry's Business College, Skerry's Cork Business School
- Type: Private
- Established: 1884 (Skerry's College Cork), 2005 (Griffith College Cork)
- Affiliations: QQI, HECA
- President: Diarmuid Hegarty
- Location: Griffith College Cork; Wellington Road, Cork., Cork, Ireland; 51.894973°N 8.475158°W
- Campus: Urban
- Website: http://www.griffith.ie

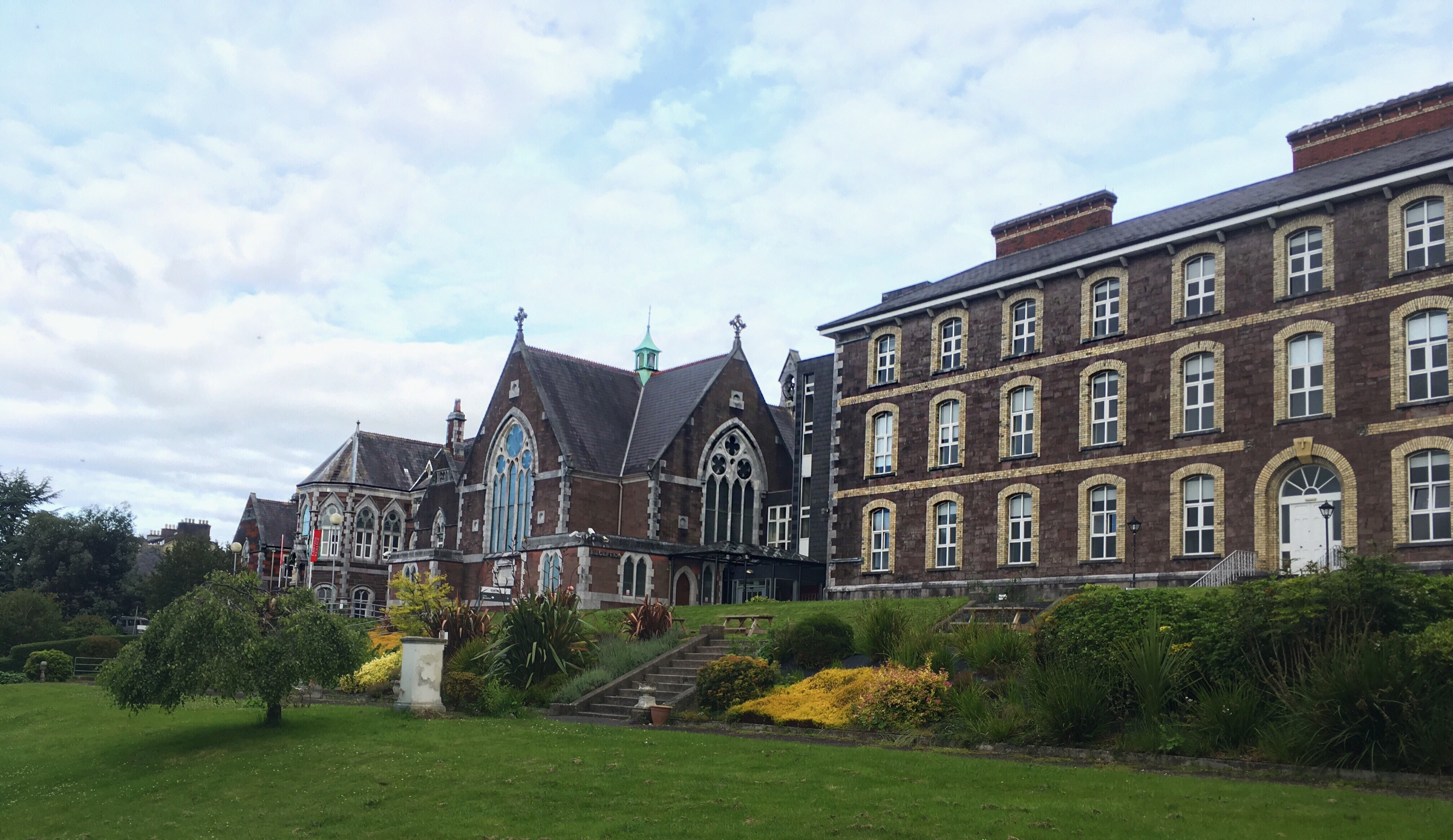
Griffith College Cork, Campus on Wellington Road.

Griffith College Cork (GCC) is a private third level (higher education) college which merged with Skerry's College Cork in 2005. Griffith College Cork runs degree and diploma programmes in Business, Law, Computing, Media & Journalism, Pharmaceutical Management, and Professional Accountancy as well as evening courses in Marketing Management, Business Management, Human Resource Management and Digital Marketing. Pharmaceutical Management is an MSc in International Pharmaceutical Business Management (QQI - Level 9). It will be offered on a full and part-time basis.

All the undergraduate and postgraduate degree courses are validated by QQI and a number of them require application via the Irish CAO system.

Full-time undergraduate QQI level 6, 7 & 8 courses were also validated to receive tax relief under the Irish Governments 1997 Act.

In August 2009 Griffith College Cork moved from its Patrick's Hill buildings to a new location on Cove Street, Sullivan's Quay, Cork, County Cork. In 2014 the college moved to its new, permanent location occupying the former Marymount Hospice on Wellington Road, overlooking the city.

== Courses ==
=== Accountancy ===
The ACCA has awarded Griffith College Cork the Platinum accreditation – the highest recognition by the ACCA and the college has also achieved the goldStar Approved Educator status from the CPA.

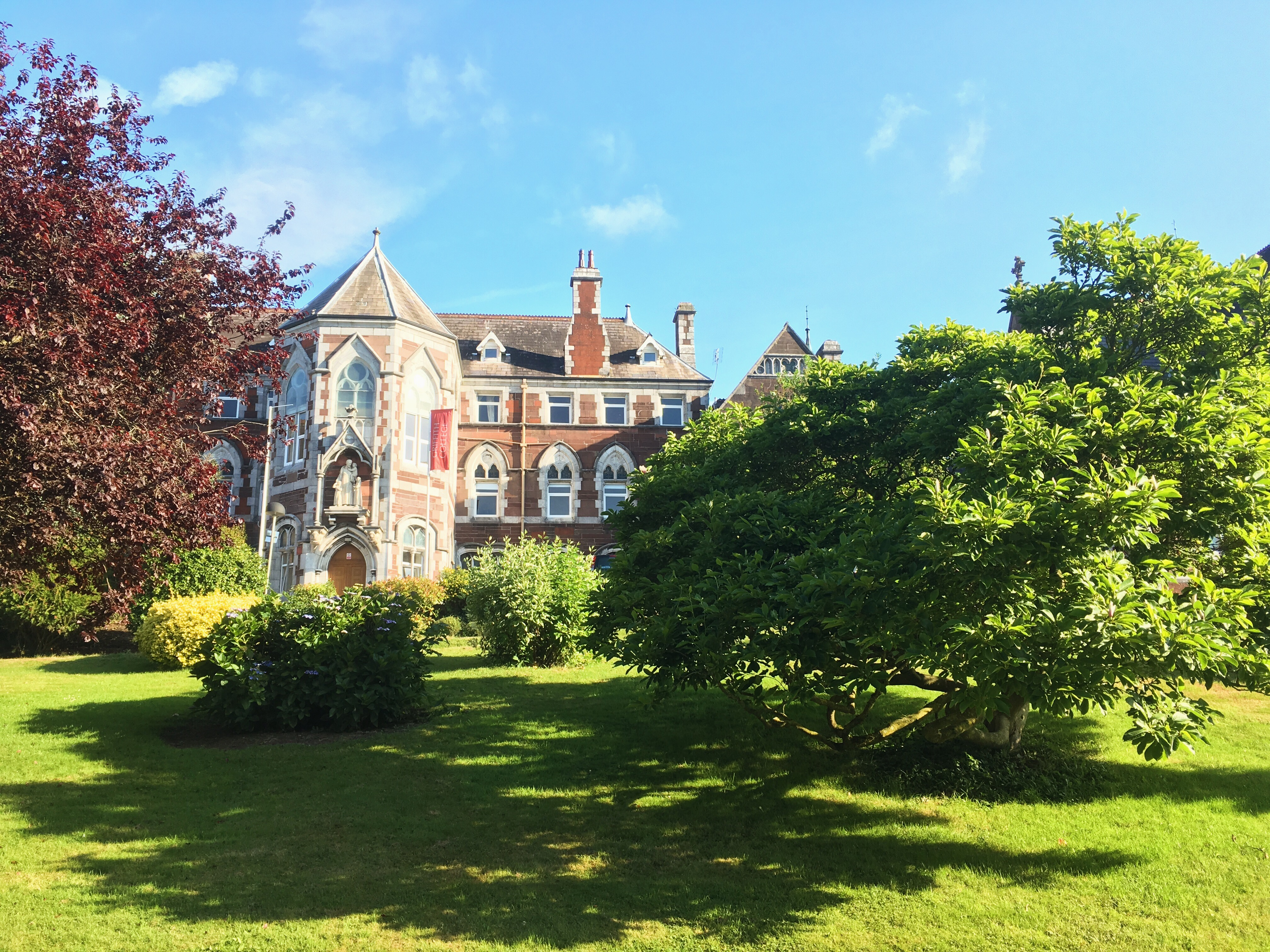
Griffith College Cork, Wellington Rd.

Computer based exams(CBE) are available in Griffith College Cork for the ACCA, and CIMA Certificate in Business Accounting.

=== Business ===
The college runs a variety of QQI validated level 7 and 8 Degrees in Business Studies, Marketing and Accountancy & Finance.

=== Law ===
The LLB(Hons) in Irish law is accredited by QQI and is recognised by the King's Inns for entry to its Degree of Barrister-at-Law which is a professional qualification for practice at the bar, it also enables graduates who wish to qualify as solicitors to sit the Law Society of Ireland’s entrance examinations. The Professional Law school runs the highly successful Preparatory Course for the Law Society Final Entrance Examinations (FE1) in Cork delivered via Video Link.

The Preparatory Course for the Entrance Examination for the King's Inns is available from Griffith by distance learning. The College also runs a Certificate in Mediation and the IILEX Certificate and Diploma in Legal Studies.

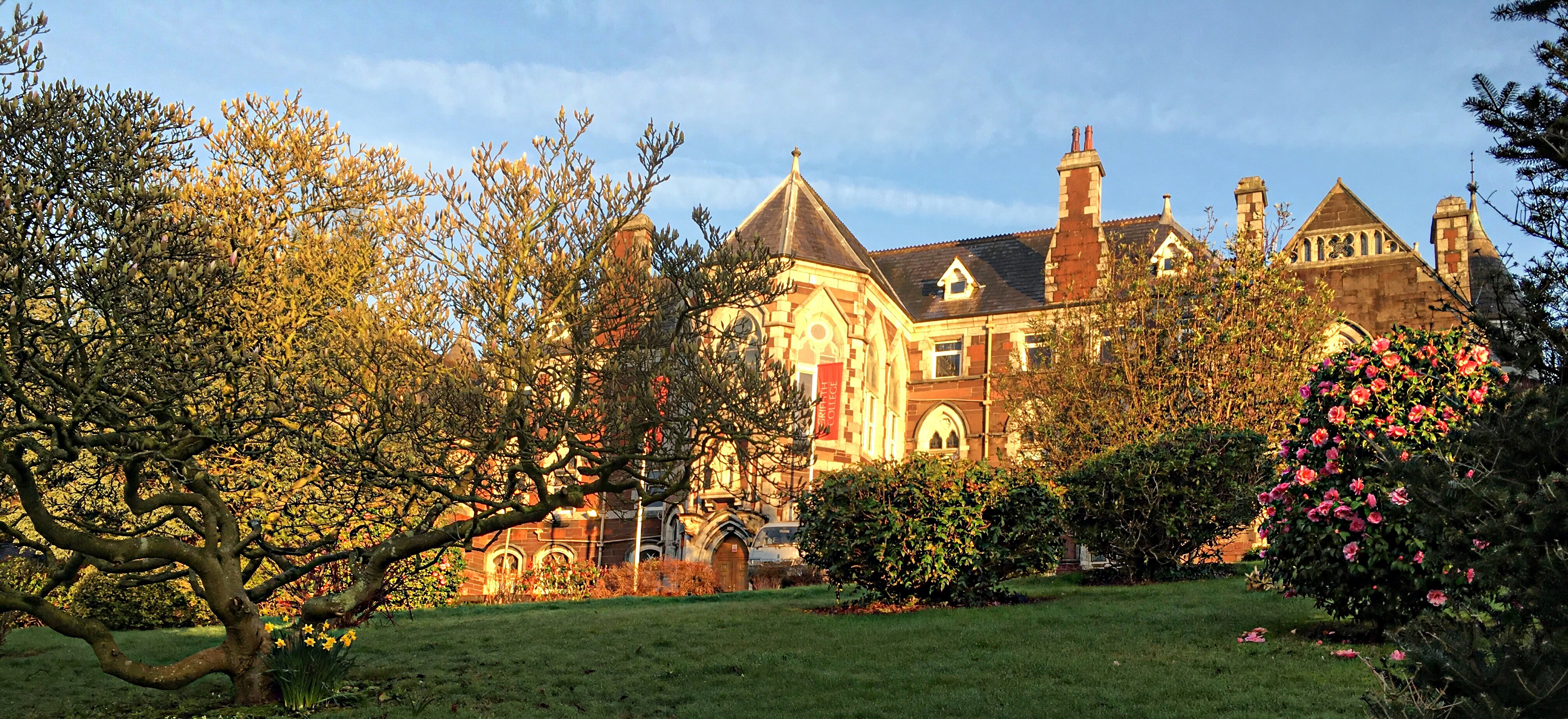
Griffith College Cork.

=== Media and journalism ===
The College runs an undergraduate BA in Journalism (HETAC). 2nd year Journalism students get on-air experience of radio running the Student Radio station Griff FM 106.7Mhz. Students also produced the student newspaper Leemail. BA in Journalism students are entitled to apply for a student NUJ Card for each year of their studies. Amongst its lecturers are figures in local radio and print journalism. GCC has also run short evening courses in Creative Music Technology and Writing Drama for Radio.

=== Computing science ===
The computing courses being offered at Griffith College Cork are the BSc (Hons) in Computing Science (Level 8) and the BSc in Computing Science

=== Pharmaceutical management ===
In February 2018, the College launched the first programme from the Griffith College Graduate Business School in Cork. The MSc in International Pharmaceutical Business Management is a QQI Level 9 masters programme which is offered on a full and part-time basis over a 1 or 2.5 year period respectively. The programme develops learners’ abilities to research current trends and developments in the Pharmaceutical Business Management Industry and to develop their knowledge, skill and competencies to work in this dynamic business arena across multiple industries, whether they are service or manufacturing oriented.

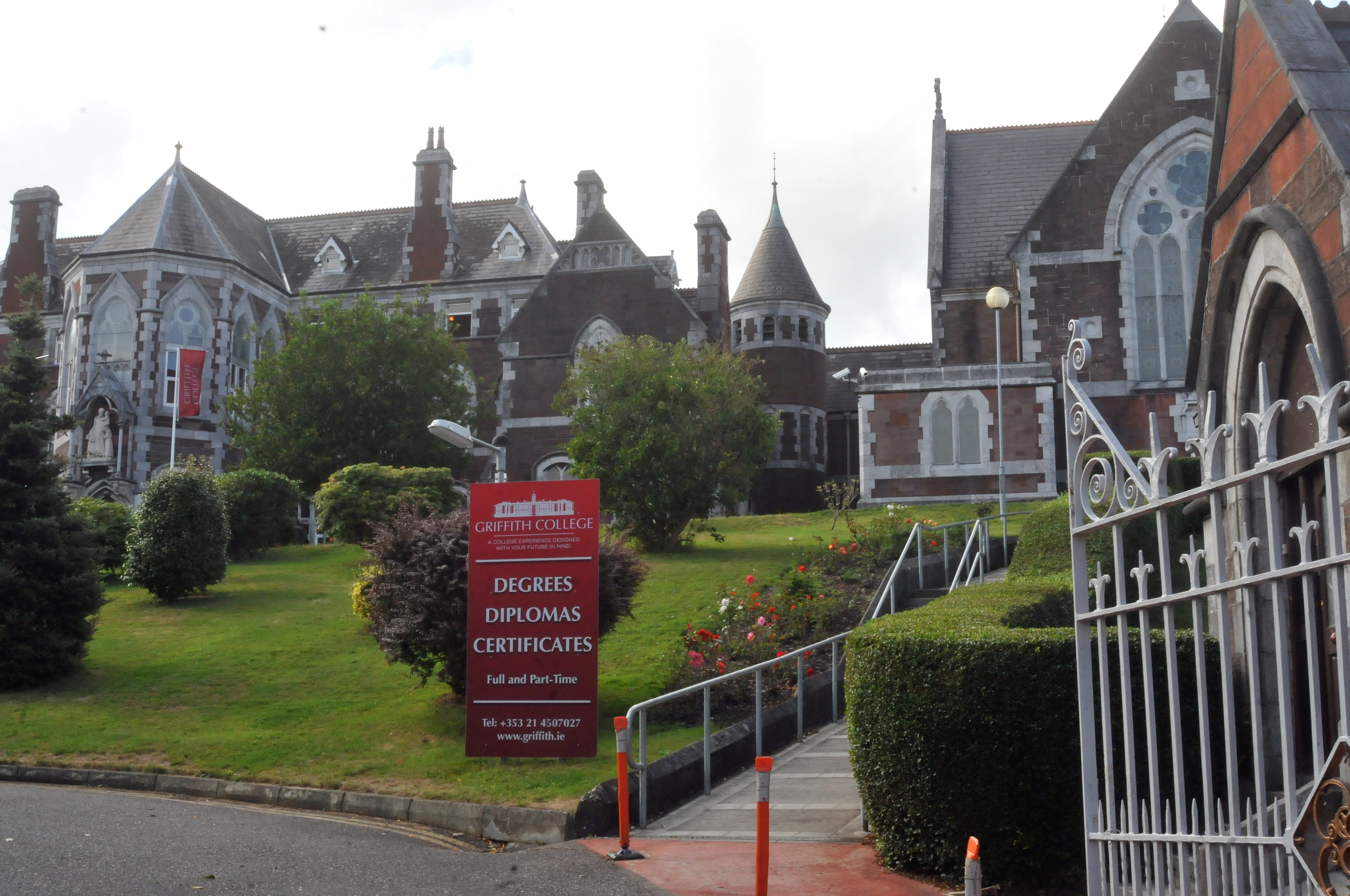
Griffith College Cork

== Facilities and services ==
=== Library ===
The College Library holds an extensive range of set course texts and background reading material for all college programmes GCC has access to a number of on-line databases including Lexis-Nexis, Westlaw and BSP. Also the online elearning platform moodle is used by the college, for providing course material to students.

=== Computing ===
The College's four computer laboratories contain 70 fully networked workstations. Printing and photocopying facilities are available to students in the Openlab.

GriffFM 10.7 – Griffith College Cork, Student Radio Station

=== Studio and student radio station ===
The college has a fully equipped radio station and studio, for use by the Journalism and Media students. In students from the media faculty will broadcast a radio station for a week in March. Griffith College Cork's Student radio station Griff FM 106.7 broadcasts on a Temporary Licence from the BCI on 106.7 MHz FM broadcast from 16 to 20 February 2017, it was also relayed online Griff FM 106.7Mhz.

== Graduation ==
The Graduation ceremony, for the academic programmes takes place each November. This ceremony is attended by family and friends of graduates as well as representatives of the validation bodies (QQI, IILEX, ICM, and ACCA) and local elected representatives. The College presents prizes for "Best Academic Achievement" in each faculty at this ceremony. For some of the other Professional programmes such as IATI, CPA and CIMA separate ceremonies take place.
