= Institute of Administrative Management =

Institute of Administrative Management (IAM)
- Founded: 1915
- Website: www.instam.org

The Institute of Administrative Management (IAM) is an awarding organisation and professional body for practising and aspiring administrative and business managers. It supports students and members across 58 countries worldwide.

== Topics ==
Administrative management is concerned with the following areas:

- Systems
- Human resources
- Communication
- Information technology
- Facilities
- Training and development
- Finance

== History ==
The IAM was formed in 1915 when a group of executives from the private and public sectors met at the London School of Economics with the intention of forming a self-development group aiming to share best practices in administrative management.

The IAM operates a number of branches across the UK, providing members with networking opportunities, as well as delivering qualifications which are recognised across England, Wales and Northern Ireland by Ofqual, DCELLS and CCEA respectively. IAM qualifications are delivered by around 250 IAM-accredited centres, offering campus-based and distance learning options to IAM students. In addition, the IAM offers independent study options to unattached students. The IAM has students working in business, commerce, industry, local and central government in the UK and abroad, for example in Singapore, Malaysia, Hong Kong, the Gulf, the West Indies and Southern Africa.

The IAM entered into liquidation and ceased trading on 20 November 2013. Industry Qualifications (IQ) announced the acquisition of its name and assets on 24 January 2014. Plans are in place to focus on re-establishing the IAM qualifications within IQ and re-engage with those that had been studying on IAM programmes. Students who were engaged in IAM award programmes will be able to complete their qualifications under IQ.

== Membership ==
The IAM is the professional body for administrative and business managers. Members include administrators, personal assistants, virtual assistants, office managers, administrative managers as well as business leaders. There are currently approximately 17,000 members.

Membership levels and designations available from the IAM:

- Student
- Affiliate
- Associate (AInstAM)
- Member (MInstAM)
- Fellow (FInstAM)
- Retired (FInstAM (Rtd) or (MInstAM (Rtd)

== Current qualifications ==
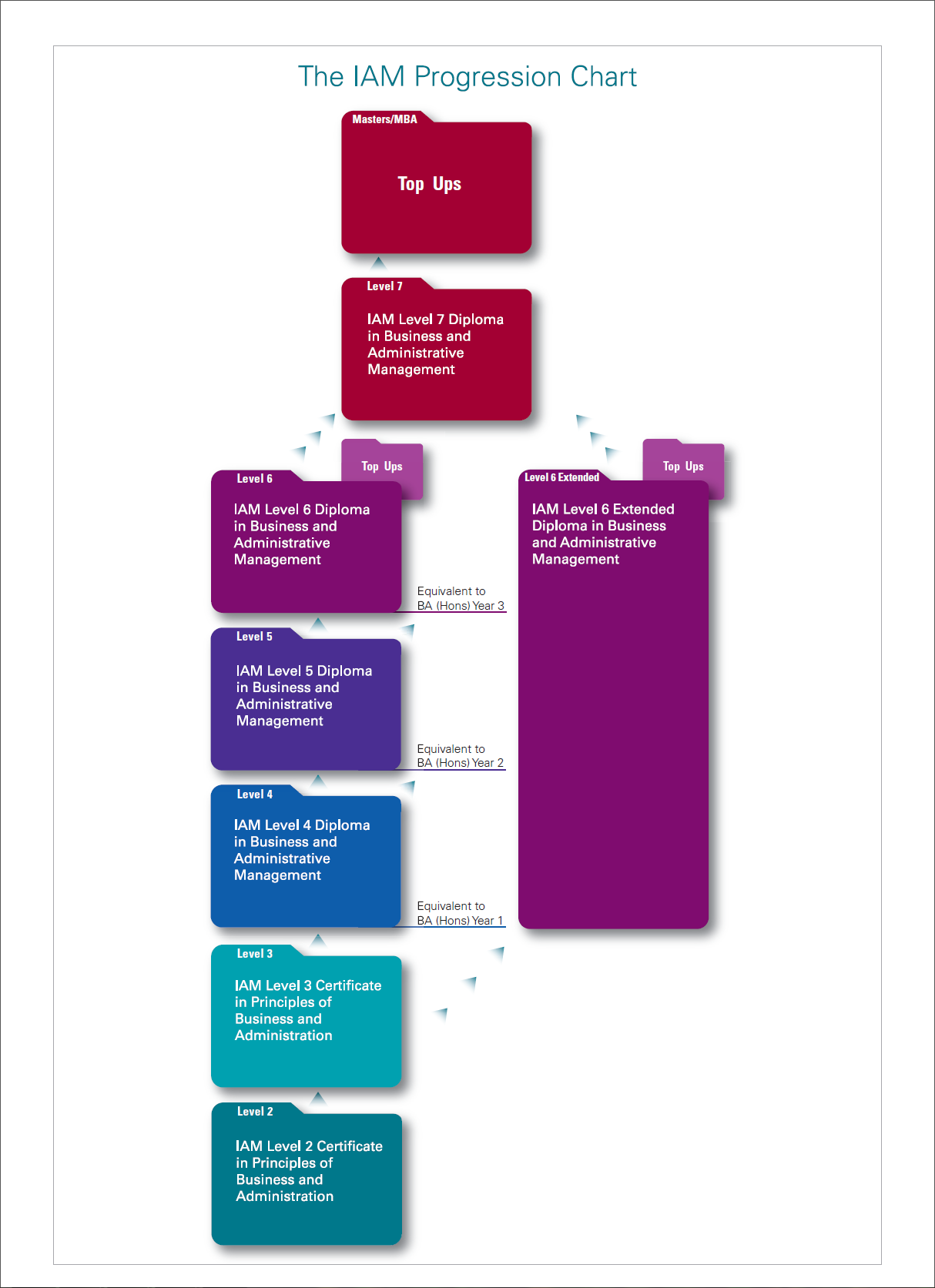
The IAM Progression Chart for current QCF qualifications

=== QCF Qualifications ===
The IAM is accredited on the Qualifications and Credit Framework (QCF). They offer the following QCF qualifications.

==== Diplomas ====
- Level 4 Diploma in Business & Administration
- Level 4 Diploma in Business & Administrative Management
- Level 5 Diploma in Business & Administrative Management
- Level 5 Diploma in Leadership & Management
- Level 6 Diploma in Business & Administrative Management
- Level 6 Diploma in Business Management
- Level 6 Extended Diploma in Business & Administrative Management

==== Certificates ====
- Level 2 Certificate in Principles of Business & Administration
- Level 3 Certificate in Principles of Business & Administration
- Level 4 Certificate in Business & Administrative Management
- Level 5 Certificate in Business & Administrative Management
- Level 5 Certificate in Governance, Leadership & Motivation

==== National Vocational Qualifications ====
- Level 2 NVQ Certificate in Business & Administration
- Level 3 NVQ Diploma in Business & Administration
- Level 4 NVQ Diploma in Business & Administration
- Level 5 NVQ Diploma in Management

=== NQF Qualifications ===
The IAM offers the following National Qualifications Framework programme.

- Level 3 Certificate in Administrative Management
