= National Computing Centre =

Research organization in England, 1966–2010

The National Computing Centre
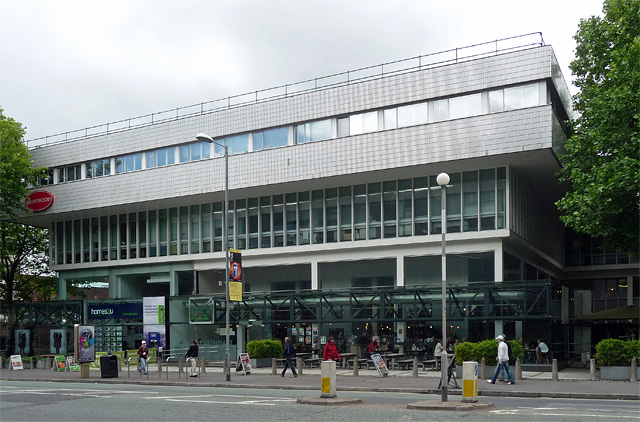
- The centre on Oxford Road, Manchester
- Type: Limited by guarantee
- Industry: It
- Genre: Not-for-profit
- Founded: 1966
- Founder: UK Government
- Defunct: 2010
- Fate: Liquidated
- Successor: Redholt Ltd
- Headquarters: Manchester, UK
- Key people: Sir A Cleaver, Sir R Cockburn, D Fairbairn OBE, P Virgo, C Pearse, J Perkins, M Gough, S Markwell
- Products: Filetab
- Services: Information, advice, education, publishing, escrow & membership services
- Owner: Mutual
- Number of employees: 500 at peak
- Subsidiaries: NCC Blackwell

The National Computing Centre Limited
- Type: Limited company
- Industry: It
- Predecessor: Redholt Ltd
- Founded: 2010
- Fate: Insolvent
- Successor: IT Accreditations Limited
- Headquarters: UK, Bournemouth
- Services: Information, advice, education, publishing, membership services, consultancy, standards
- Total equity: £12,000
- Owner: T Ring, S Fox, K Vooght, S Markwell, S Sidhu, P Morris
- Website: NCC

The National Computing Centre (NCC) was an independent not-for-profit membership and research organisation in the United Kingdom.

After the original organisation was liquidated in 2010, Redholt Limited changed its name to the National Computing Centre Limited (NCC Ltd) and acquired the assets of the original NCC through a pre-pack administration arrangement. This new for-profit company, formed in 2010, initially offered some of the same services as the original NCC but in 2012 became a shell company as it had to file for protection from its creditors and make most of its staff redundant.

== Formation and early years ==
The National Computing Centre was founded on 10 June 1966 by the Labour government, as an autonomous not-for-profit organisation, to be the "voice of the computer user", encourage the growth of computer usage in the UK and ensure that the necessary education and training was made available. NCC was one of the visible outcomes from Harold Wilson's "White heat of technology" speech and the formation of a Ministry of Technology, the others being the computer company International Computers Limited (ICL) and chip maker Inmos (both now defunct).

Initially, most income came directly from government grants, but with the growth of NCC's commercial operations this ceased in 1989. During the 1970s and 1980s NCC had a joint venture with Blackwell Publishing (NCC Blackwell) which was a significant publisher of academic computing books.

Between 1989 and 1996, NCC operated with five main divisions – education, consulting, escrow, membership services, and system engineering deriving income from membership fees and its commercial activities.

A valued component was the Computer Validation Service, which ran Validation testing for Fortran 77 and Pascal. These validation tests were issued in accordance with a reciprocal agreement with General Services Administration in the United States.

== NCC education ==
In 1996, the National Computing Centre sold its overseas education business, NCC Education, to stave off a financial crisis that occurred when the company breached its borrowing limits.

== MBO, NCC Services Ltd and NCC Group plc ==
In 1999, it sold its commercial divisions (turnover of less than £10 million), which provided escrow, consultancy, system engineering services to its existing management team supported by ECI Ventures for £5 million. This new company was named NCC Services Limited and later became NCC Group Limited of which the National Computing Centre held a 20% share. John Perkins became the new managing director of National Computing Centre, which remained a not-for-profit membership organisation.

The NCC Services Ltd management team of managing director Chris Pearse and directors John Morris, Peter Bird, and Chris Sadler was strengthened in March 2000 by the appointment of Rob Cotton as Finance Director and who also took over control of the Escrow division in May of that year, with Morris leaving at that time. Following a substantial fall off of revenues as Y2K came and passed, and due to the failure of the company before this date to invest in its general consultancy, security, system engineering and escrow business during the Y2K period, the group began to make monthly losses before the benefits of the changes to the escrow business instigated by Rob Cotton were felt and the company returned to profitability.

Renamed NCC Group, in May 2000, and with escrow now the cornerstone of the group, Rob Cotton led a secondary management buy-out in 2003 valuing NCC Group at £30 million and supported by Barclays Private Equity. At this point, the National Computing Centre sold its shares in NCC Group as did Pearse, Bird and Sadler who left the business. The NCC Group subsequently floated on the AIM stock market in 2004 for £55 million and was listed on the London Stock Exchange in 2007 with a market capitalisation of nearly £390 million as of June 2014.

== 21st century ==
NCC received substantial proceeds from the sale of NCC Group Limited (circa £11 million between 2000 and 2003 plus dividends) and from the multi-million sale of its Manchester city centre buildings (Armstrong House and Oxford House) to Bruntwood Group. Following the retirement of Perkins, Michael Gough was appointed as CEO in 2000 and NCC pursued a new strategy of rapidly developing and expanding its membership services by acquisition.

After 2000, and particularly after the second sale of its shares in NCC Group in 2003, acquisitions accelerated to acquire a number of related companies, membership organisations, publications, publishing rights and to fund joint ventures. The acquisitions included: Management Consultancy News; Conspectus; CIO Connect; The Construction Industry Computing Association; Certus; The Evaluation Centre; Institute of IT Training; The Impact Programme; and PMP. Publishing rights acquired included the Naked Leader and joint ventures included: the NCC/Ashridge Business School MBA; NCC/AQA Applied ICT; and ProfIT.

Funds were spent attempting to develop new products and services including web hosting which did not prove commercially successful. In 2002 NCC adopted a policy of vigorous support for open-source software. Funds were also received from Microsoft towards a software evaluations centre. Contracts were won to support the uptake of IT particularly amongst SMEs including open source software and the Open Source Academy, and the development of an accreditation standard for IT services which became operational in 2009.

There was a re-branding exercise in which NCC re-branded as Principia, a brand that was quickly dropped and the NCC brand resumed, a move that seemed to echo a similarly named and disastrous re-branding of the UK Royal Mail to Consignia.

These survival strategies failed and the National Computing Centre diminished rapidly in size and turnover. NCC continued to make unsustainable losses but there was no change in strategic direction. To stem the losses NCC was forced to rapidly close or dispose of many of the acquisitions at a loss to the organisation. Michael Gough left the business in February 2008. In March 2008, Steve Markwell was appointed as Chief Executive but there was no improvement in the company's fortunes or significant change in strategic direction. One significant asset remaining, Filetab, was transferred in 2009 to a new company called NCC Filetab whose managing director was also managing director of NCC. With losses and the size of the pension fund deficit increasing, the company was unable to meet its obligations and was placed into administration by its management.

== Administration, liquidation and pre-pack ==
In February 2010, NCC went into administration and ultimately liquidation. The few remaining assets and intellectual property rights were transferred in a "pre-pack" administration arrangement to Redholt Ltd a new private company, thus distancing the new company from the NCC creditors, which included a substantial pension fund liability resulting in the insolvency of the pension fund later that year. Redholt Ltd was owned by a group of six shareholders, including former managers and two Directors of the insolvent National Computing Centre.

Redholt Ltd, was renamed as The National Computing Centre Limited (NCC Ltd) in Feb 2011. In 2011 NCC Ltd extended its portfolio of services to include IT consulting, mainly as a virtual organisation through the use of independent associate consultants. The 'new' NCC Ltd was not a mutual not-for-profit organisation, but retained some of the member organisations of the liquidated company and initially it delivered some of the same products and services.

By the end of 2011, the 'new' NCC Ltd once again faced financial difficulties and in 2012 it sought voluntary arrangements with its creditors to step away from its debts. The company had run up substantial losses, had not paid suppliers and had not filed accounts. Nearly all staff were laid off and the business having already left its iconic building in 2010 it finally left Manchester. The company was formally recorded at Companies House as being insolvent and in a voluntary arrangement as of 2 March 2012. The insolvency practitioner dealing with the companies affairs was Wilkins Kennedy of London. It would appear that from this point NCC Ltd was no longer recognised by any trade body, association or any part of government as the "voice of the computer user" and offered no substantial services to its client base and became a shell company. In July 2013 the registered address was changed to an accommodation address in London and between then and July 2017 the operational address was at times listed as Aston Abbotts in Buckinghamshire, Bournemouth and Welwyn Garden City.

In July 2017, NCC Ltd changed its name to IT Accreditations Limited and the ncc.co.uk domain name and company name became the property of NCC Group plc, so ending 50 years of an organisation trading as The National Computing Centre.
