= Cork Savings Bank =

19th century neoclassical bank in Cork, Ireland

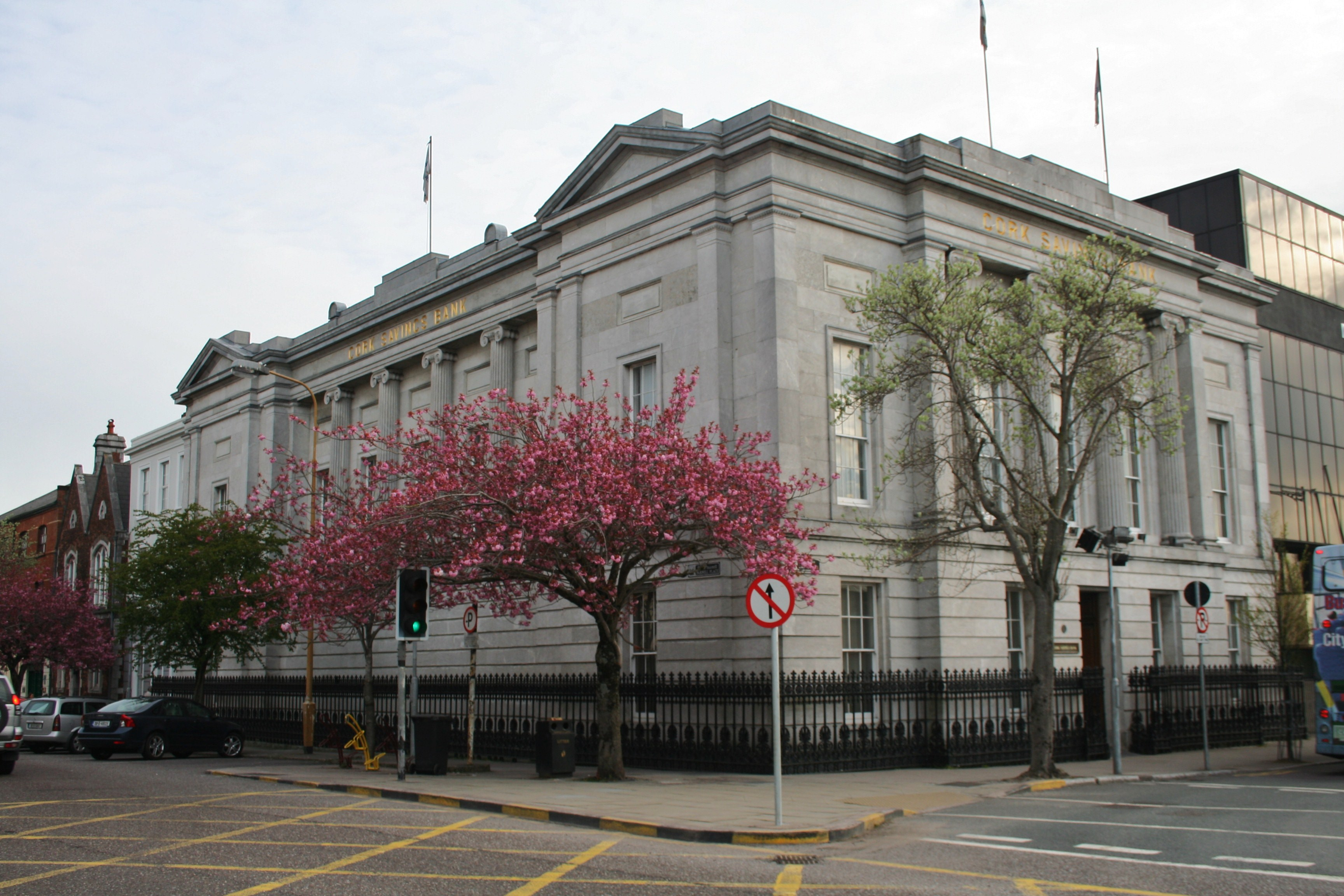

General information
- Address: 1 Lapp's Quay, Cork, Ireland
- Completed: 1842

Design and construction
- Architect(s): Thomas & Kearns Deane

Cork Savings Bank is a nineteenth century neoclassical building on Lapp's Quay in Cork city, Ireland. A purpose-built bank, it was completed in 1842 and is currently in use by University College Cork as their so-called "Centre for Executive Education".

== History ==
Cork Savings Bank, as an institution, was founded in 1817, following the passing of a law legalising the establishment of savings banks in the UK and Ireland. Originally based in the Royal Cork Institution, in 1824 the bank acquired their first building, which was located on what is now Oliver Plunkett Street, on the site of the present general post office. The winning application for the design of the current building was submitted in November 1839 by Thomas and Kearns Deane, beating out applications from other architects, including Henry Hill. Following its completion in 1842, the Cork Savings Bank moved into the new building, located on 1 Lapp's Quay, on 20 August 1842.

In 1950, renovations to the building were carried out to the designs of Henry Houghton Hill.

In 1986, Cork Savings Bank merged with Limerick Savings Bank, forming the Cork and Limerick Savings Bank. In 1992, Cork and Limerick Savings Bank further merged with TSB Dublin, forming the Trustee Savings Bank. In 2001, the Trustee Savings Bank joined the Irish Life & Permanent Group, who at that point rebranded as Permanent TSB. The branch in 1 Lapp's Quay was closed in 2012.

The building was acquired by Cork City Council on 2 October 2014. Originally intended for use as a civic amenity, in 2016 it was sold to University College Cork, who in December 2018 opened the building as their business school’s "Centre for Executive Education". In 2019, the building was awarded the CBA Better Building Award for Best in Conservation.

== Architecture ==
The building is in the neoclassical style, and is built of ashlar limestone.

A statue of William Crawford, made by John Hogan, was installed in 1843. Originally located in the main banking hall, it is now located in the Crawford Art Gallery.

== In culture ==
Cork Savings Bank is depicted in an 1842 watercolour of the same name by James Mahoney.
