= Limperts Academy =

Limperts Academy of Design is an international awarding body for professional design programmes. It offers a range of courses in design, including project management and commercial design consultancy. Limperts offers a Diploma in Interior Design & Decoration and the Higher National Diploma in Interior Design (BTEC HND), and also, Landscape, Gardening Design, Image and Fashion design and Project Management.

Courses are delivered in the evening at its Dublin centre or as correspondence courses (distance learning). A number of schools and colleges independently run courses doing the Limperts validated courses.

== Recognition ==
- Limperts Academy of Design is the first education and training organisation to achieve ISO 9001:2000 Certification.
- Limperts interior design students are entitled to apply for membership with the Chartered Society of Designers (CSD).
- Limperts Academy of Design students who successfully achieve the HND in Interior Design are eligible to apply for the NCIDQ (the professional body in the United States and Canada) examination after obtaining the necessary amount of work experience.
