= Filetab =

Decision table-based computer programming language

Filetab is a decision table-based computer programming language widely used in business in the 1960s and 1970s.

== History ==
Filetab has a long history, originally designed in the late 1960s and descended from the DETAB programming. Filetab was developed by the National Computing Centre (NCC) and originally used on ICL operating systems such as GEORGE 2/3 and VME, but ported to a large number of others.

The original architect of Filetab was Tom Barnard, who developed the program (LITA - LIst and TAbulate) for Morgan Crucible when employed by them as a programmer on an ICL 1902 from 1965 to 1968. Its purpose was to produce simple ad hoc reports similar to those created with a plugboard on a punched card tabulator, bypassing the necessity to write an assembly language program in PLAN. It required only a few cards to specify the input and output formats, headings, sequencing and totalling. LITA could not be described as a programming language as it only required run-time parameters indicating field types and locations in records and no compilation. In those days there was no concern by Morgan's regarding ownership or copyright when Barnard left to further develop the software as Filetab.

In 2009 facing financial difficulty NCC sold the rights to Filetab to a newly formed company "NCC Filetab Limited". The managing director of NCC Filetab Limited was also the managing director of NCC at this time, although NCC Filetab Limited, despite the similarity of its name, was not owned by NCC. In 2010 NCC was declared insolvent and was liquidated.

== Variants ==
Versions produced include:

- TABN for ICL 1900 series mainframes
- TAB-360 for IBM System/360 (also known as DETAB-360)
- UNITAB for UNIVAC
- HTAB for Honeywell
- TAB-11 for RSTS/E on PDP-11
- FTL6 for ICT 1900 series
- DTPL for ICT 1900 series – slightly different from FTL6
- RPL-11 for RT-11, RSTS/E, RSX-11 on PDP-11
- RPL-3 for IBM System/3
- Filetab-D for x86 and PDP-11
- FPL - Fast programming Language. Written in 8086 Assembler for IBM PCs and compatibles. (Released in 1986). Written by Kevin Powis.
- Rapid-Expert and expertGenius extended syntax for Microsoft Windows, Unix and OpenVMS
- RapidGen compiler and FILETAB legacy converters for Windows, Unix and OpenVMS

A Linux version was produced in 2001, which although free to use was not Open Source and licensed under the GPL, drawing some criticism from the Open Source Software Community.
