= NCC Education =

English education awarding body

NCC Education Ltd.
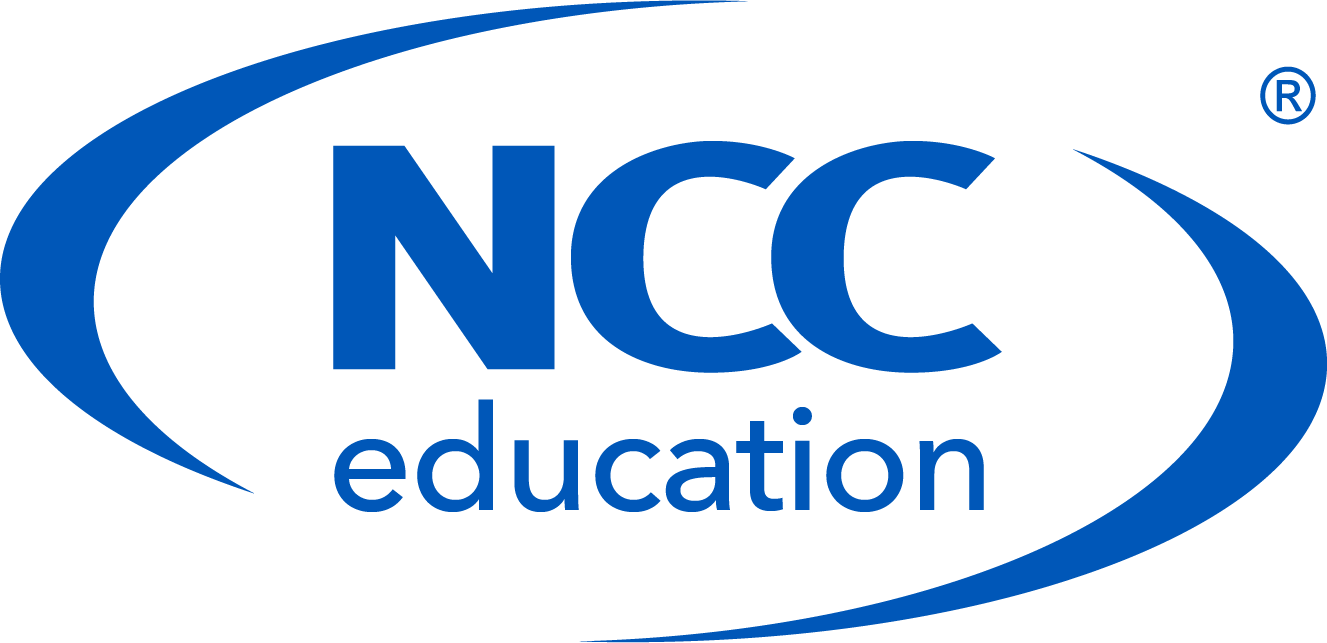
- Type: Limited
- Industry: Education
- Founded: 1966
- Headquarters: Manchester, United Kingdom
- Website: nccedu.com

NCC Education Ltd. is a private provider and awarding body of English education. The company provides students with the opportunity to earn internationally recognized British qualifications by studying at one of its Accredited Partner Centres, either through the classroom or online.

== History ==
Originally part of the National Computing Centre, NCC Education was initially established as an IT initiative by the British Government in 1966. NCC Education started offering IT qualifications in 1976 and from 1997 developed its Higher Education portfolio to include Business programs and a range of foundation programs. Since early 2002, NCC Education has offered Information Communication Technology (ICT) programs for schools.

== Today ==
Currently, NCC Education has a network of over 400 partner centres located in more than 60 countries, international offices situated in the UK (Manchester), China (Beijing), Malaysia (Kuala Lumpur), Singapore, and South Africa (Cape Town), and employs academic managers worldwide. NCC Education is accredited by The Qualifications and Curriculum Authority (QCA) and regulated by Ofqual. Recognised by the Department for Business, Innovation and Skills (DBIS) in the UK.

The company's qualifications are articulated by a number of UK universities or for entry into years one, two, and three of specific degree programs. NCC Education works in close partnership with the University of Central Lancashire (UCLan) and the University of Greenwich.
