= Institute of Commercial Management =

Institute in Hampshire, England

- Abbreviation: ICM
- Formation: 1979; 47 years ago
- Type: Nonprofit professional association
- Legal status: Charity
- Headquarters: Ringwood, Hampshire, United Kingdom
- Region served: United Kingdom and worldwide
- Services: Education, certification
- Website: www.icm.education

The Institute of Commercial Management - (ICM) is a British professional body for Commercial and Business Development Managers, and an Examining and Professional Qualifications Awarding-Body for business and management students. It was founded in 1979 and it is categorised as a not-for-profit organisation; accordingly, the establishment is registered as an educational charity.

The institute has its international headquarters in Ringwood, Hampshire, England - United Kingdom.

The ICM is recognised as an awarding organization by the Office of Qualifications and Examinations Regulation (Ofqual) - The United Kingdom's regulatory body for public examinations and publicly funded qualifications.

== See also ==
- Commercial management
