= Higher Education Colleges Association =

Representative body in Ireland

The Higher Education Colleges Association (HECA) is a representative body of independent third level colleges in Ireland. It was formed in 1991, and its stated mission is to "promote the enhancement of teaching and learning within HECA colleges, such that it has tangible effects in the classroom, effectively enabling people to learn".

The association acts as a lobby group and has lobbied on behalf of its members interests in government and legislative circles. HECA also represents the independent education sector on a number of bodies, including Quality and Qualifications Ireland (QQI), the Bologna Process, International Education Board of Ireland, and the Irish Higher Education Quality Network.
