= Cultúrlann McAdam Ó Fiaich =

- Cultúrlann McAdam Ó Fiaich logo

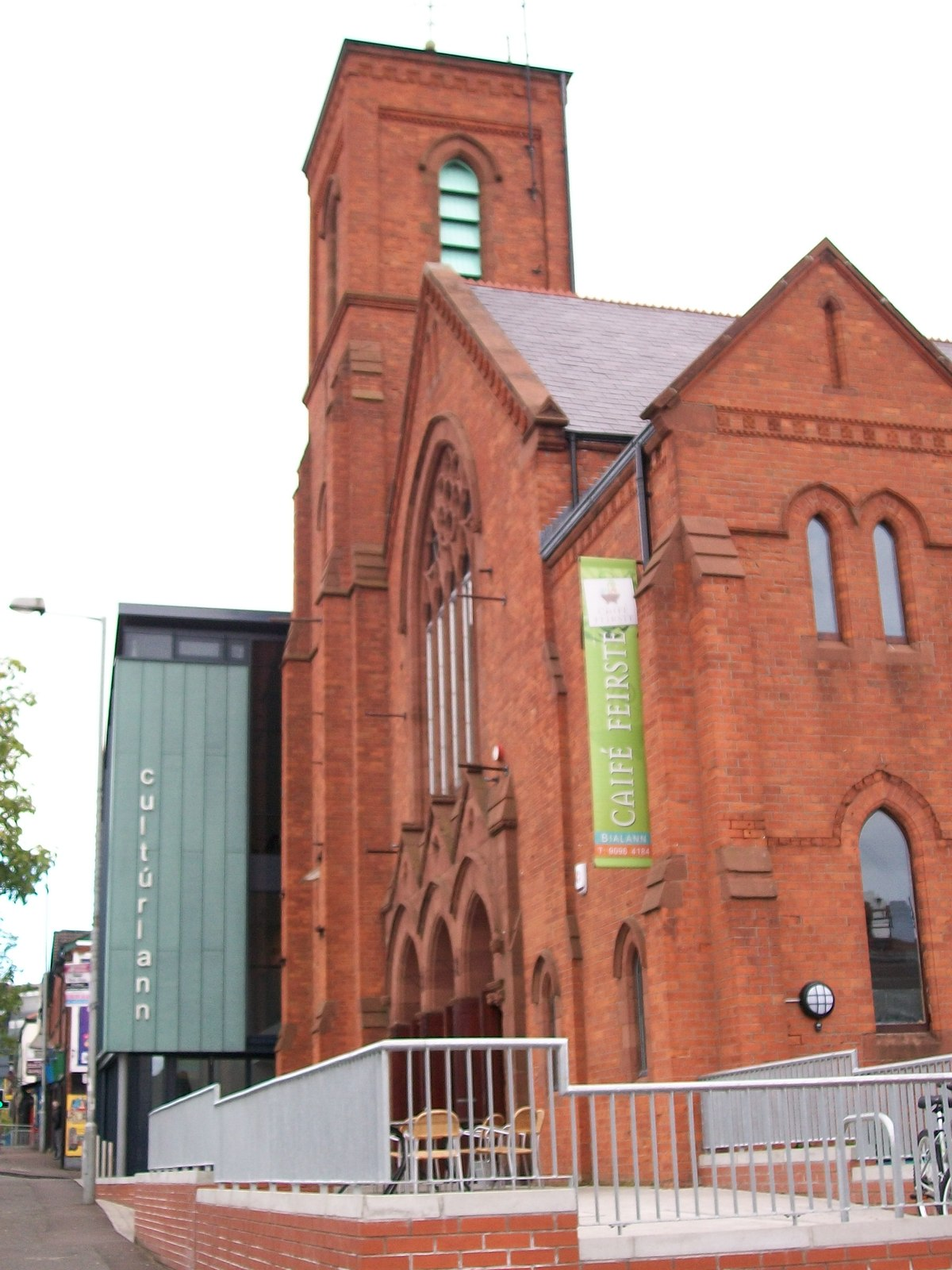
- Cultúrlann McAdam Ó Fiaich

- Location within Belfast

General information
- Type: Theatre, Concert hall, Art Gallery, Conference venue
- Architectural style: Gothic
- Location: 216 Falls Road, Belfast; The Gaeltacht Quarter; Belfast, BT12 6AH, Northern Ireland
- Coordinates: 54.592465°N 5.961260°W
- Inaugurated: 17 February 1991; 35 years ago
- Renovated: 2010–2011

Technical details
- Floor count: 4

Website
- culturlann.ie

Cultúrlann McAdam Ó Fiaich (An Chultúrlann) is an Irish language cultural centre in The Gaeltacht Quarter and is located on the Falls Road, Belfast, Northern Ireland. Opened in 1991, the centre underwent renovation in 2010 and was opened the following year by then Irish President Mary McAleese.

The centre is home to an art gallery named after local artist Gerard Dillon, a theatre, restaurant, book shop, offices and conference rooms. In 2011, the centre was estimated to receive over 80,000 visitors per year.

== History ==
=== 1991–2010 ===
Cultúrlann McAdam Ó Fiaich was founded in 1991 after the purchase of Broadway Presbyterian Church on Falls Road, Belfast. It is named after 19th century Presbyterian businessman and Gaelic revivalist Robert Shipboy MacAdam and 20th century Gaelic scholar Cardinal Tomás Ó Fiaich.

Co-founder Gearóid Ó Cairealláin also founded Raidió Fáilte which aired from the building and Aisling Ghéar, the resident theatre production group. An Chultúrlann was also home to Coláiste Feirste, Northern Ireland's first Irish-medium secondary school with activist Fergus O'Hare serving as principal. The school began with nine pupils., before the school moved to the nearby Beech Hill House, previously owned by the Riddel family.

In 2010, An Chultúrlann announced a major renovation programme funded by the Department of Culture, Arts and Leisure, Arts Council of Northern Ireland, International Fund for Ireland, Northern Ireland Tourist Board and the Department for Social Development.

=== 2011 – present ===
The renovated Cultúrlann McAdam Ó Fiaich was re-opened by Irish president Mary McAleese on 19 September 2011, to celebrate 20 years since the centre's opening. The extension and renovation cost £1.9 million and included the building of an interactive exhibition space and art gallery, named after local artist Gerard Dillon. Also refurbished was An Ceathrú Póilí, an Irish language bookshop within the centre and Bia, the restaurant.

BBC Two Northern Ireland aired a documentary on 12 December 2011 to celebrate the reopening.

== Spaces and resident organisations ==
- Gerard Dillon Gallery – art gallery
- Siobhán McKenna Theatre – theatre and concert hall
- An Ceathrú Póilí – Irish language bookshop
- Na Ballaí Bána – gallery
- An Taiscumar – interactive exhibition
- Bia – restaurant
- Aisling Ghéar – theatre company
- Nós – Irish language magazine
- Tobar Productions – TV production company

=== Former resident organisations ===
- Raidió Fáilte – Radio station founded in An Chultúrlann
- Coláiste Feirste – Irish language secondary school founded in An Chultúrlann in 1991
- Lá / Lá Nua – former Irish language daily newspaper
- Dúch Dúchais – design company
