= An Ceathrú Póilí =

Independent bookshop in Belfast

Coordinates: 54.592465°N 5.961260°W

- Type: Private
- Industry: Bookshop, Music shop, Jeweller
- Founded: 1983; 43 years ago
- Headquarters: 216 Falls Road, Belfast, Northern Ireland
- Number of locations: 1 shop, 1 pop-up university shop
- Area served: Worldwide (online), Ireland and UK (in-store)
- Key people: Áine Nic Gearailt; Pádraigín Ní Mhurchú; Aisling Ní Loidéain; Gearóid Ó Cearaláin; Pól Mag Uidhir
- Products: Books, music, crafts, musical instruments, Celtic jewellery, paintings, artworks, stoneware, hardware, software
- Number of employees: 3
- Website: www.anceathrupoili.com

An Ceathrú Póilí (English: The Fourth Policeman; founded 1983) is an independent bookshop based in Cultúrlann McAdam Ó Fiaich on the Falls Road in the Gaeltacht Quarter of Belfast, Northern Ireland. The shop primarily sells Irish language books and Irish traditional music recordings and also sells several hundred English-language books on the topics of Irish history and politics. An Ceathrú Póilí also sells Irish musical instruments, Celtic jewelry and craft.

== History ==
=== 1983–2010 ===
An Ceathrú Póilí was founded in 1983 and was housed in Ardscoil Bhéal Feirste. After the Ardscoil was destroyed by fire in a 1984, the shop had a nomadic existence until the founding of Cultúrlann McAdam Ó Fiaich in 1991 in the old Broadway Presbyterian Church on Falls Road. The centre was used as an Irish-medium secondary school (now Coláiste Feirste) and theatre space with the book shop located on the ground floor with An Caifé Glas (now known as Bia).

=== 2011–present ===
An Ceathrú Póilí was renovated in 2011 with Irish president Mary McAleese re-opening the cultural centre in 2011. The shop began selling online in September 2016. It hosts regular book launches in collaboration with publishers Coiscéim, Cló Iar-Chonnacht and An Gúm.
