= Northern Resistance =

Northern Resistance may refer to:

- Northern Resistance Movement, Irish republican organisation
- National Resistance Front, Afghan military organization
