= Gaeltacht Quarter, Belfast =

Irish-speaking neighbourhood

Coordinates: 54.592°N 5.963°W

The Gaeltacht Quarter (Irish: An Cheathrú Ghaeltachta [ənˠ ˌçahɾˠuː ˈɣeːl̪ˠt̪ˠəxt̪ˠə]) in Belfast, Northern Ireland, is an area surrounding the Falls Road in the west of the city. A Gaeltacht is an area where the Irish language is spoken. Unlike the traditional Gaeltacht areas in the Republic of Ireland, Belfast's Gaeltacht Quarter does not have legally defined geographical boundaries. The Quarter serves as a socio-linguistic hub focused on the Falls Road/Andersonstown Road corridor in the west of the city, and aims to promote Irish language and Irish culture in the area and to develop associated tourist attractions.

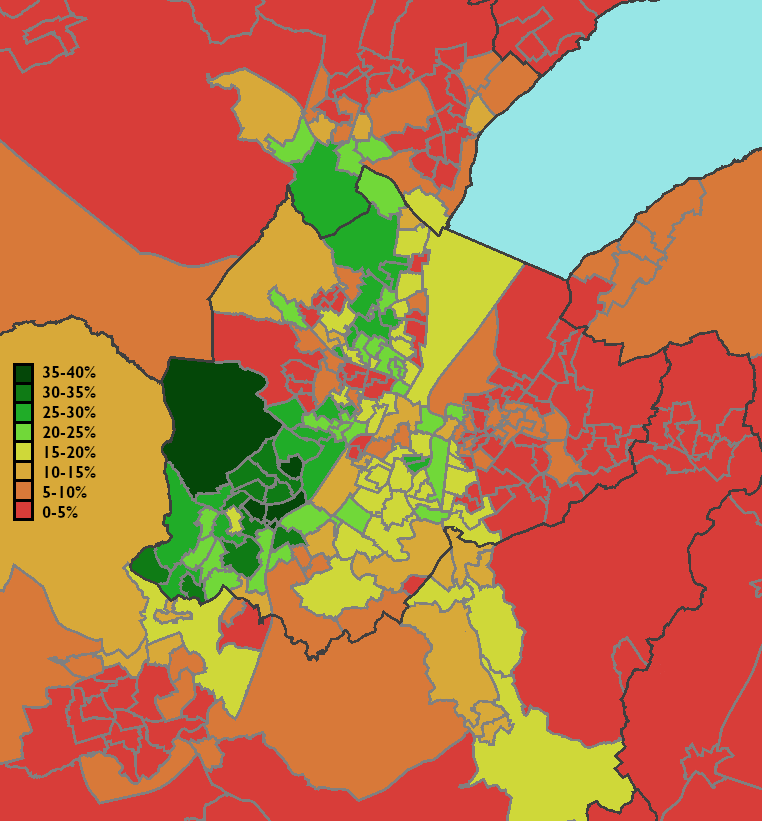
Population percentage that speaks Irish in the Belfast area, 2021 Northern Ireland census

Since the 1980s the Irish language has been statistically stronger in Belfast (especially in the west of the city) than anywhere else in Northern Ireland. The city has witnessed a steady growth of active English-Irish bilingualism, concentrated in the electoral wards in the west of the city. According to the 2021 census, out of the 333,748 people residing in Belfast city, 15.5% of people in the city have some knowledge of Irish, and 5.4% of the city's population claim to be able to speak, read, write and understand spoken Irish. 3.9% of people in the city use Irish daily and 0.8% speak it as their main language at home.

Census 2021 – Belfast City Council area	333,748	100%
Has some ability in Irish	51,583	15.48%
Can read, write, speak and understand Irish	17,986	5.39%
Speaks Irish daily	13,110	3.93%
Irish is main language	2,659	0.80%

According to Innti poet and scholar of Modern literature in Irish Louis de Paor, Belfast Irish, "a new urban dialect" of Ulster Irish, was "forged in the heat of Belfast during The Troubles". The same dialect, according to de Paor, has been used in the poetry of Gearóid Mac Lochlainn and other radically innovative writers like him. The controversial hip hop music trio Kneecap is also based in the Gaeltacht Quarter and performs rap music in the West Belfast urban dialect of Ulster Irish.

Throughout the Quarter six Irish-medium primary schools are located: Gaelscoil an Lonnáin, Gaelscoil na bhFál, Bunscoil an tSléibhe Dhuibh, Gaelscoil na Móna, Bunscoil Phobal Feirste and Scoil na Fuinseoige. Coláiste Feirste is one of the fastest-growing secondary schools in Northern Ireland and was the first to teach all subjects through Irish. A third-level institution in the area is St Mary's University College, Belfast which offers teaching qualifications through Irish. Cumann Chluain Árd offers Irish classes for learners to adults in the community.

Foras na Gaeilge have their Northern Ireland regional offices in Belfast city centre and fund organisations which provide services (such as youth services, sports training facilities, adult learning, live music) through the medium of Irish for the local Irish-speaking community including the following:

Committee	Location	Level
Glór na Móna	West Belfast	High
Ionad na Fuiseoige	West Belfast	Medium
Ionad Uíbh Eachach	West Belfast	High
Cumann Cultúrtha Mhic Reachtain	North Belfast	Medium
Croí Éanna	North Belfast	Medium
An Droichead	South Belfast	Medium

In 2011, Turas began promoting Irish through night classes and cultural events at Skainos Centre on the Newtownards Road in east Belfast. Beginning as a grassroots effort, spearheaded primarily by Linda Ervine, Turas aims to promote Irish in the Protestant Unionist community in the belief that "the language belongs to all".

Proposals for a Gaeltacht Quarter began in 2002 as a recommendation of the Joint West Belfast/Greater Shankill Task Force. The plan was then adopted by the Department of Culture, Arts and Leisure and Belfast City Council.

Key sites and events in the Gaeltacht quarter include Cultúrlann McAdam Ó Fiaich and Féile an Phobail. Many businesses in the Gaeltacht Quarter have Irish language or bilingual signage, public buses announce upcoming bus stops in English and in Irish, and many street names appear bilingually in both languages. There is also an Irish-language community radio station Raidió Fáilte. Conradh na Gaeilge (The Gaelic League) also have offices in the Gaeltacht Quarter. The Gaeltacht Quarter features highly in the proliferation of events that take part in west Belfast and the surrounding districts every year; Féile an Phobail, Féile na Carraige, Belfast TradFest, Sean-Nós na Fearsaide, Féile na gCloigíní Gorma, Liú Lúnasa and Scoil Samhraidh Mhic Reachtain. In the Gaeltacht Quarter there can be found a broad range of basic family services; including pre-school and afterschool childcare through Irish, Irish-medium youth clubs, Irish medium GAA teams, a cycling club, a gallery, several bilingual coffee shops, a theatre, a school gym, film clubs, elderly citizens meet-ups, a reading circle and several pubs which all cater for and are all well-attended by the local bilingual Irish-speaking community.

== In popular culture ==
The 2024 biopic film Kneecap, in which the band members play themselves alongside more experienced actors including Michael Fassbender, Josie Walker, and Simone Kirby, is set in the Gaeltacht Quarter in 2019. The film premiered at the Sundance Film Festival on January 18, 2024, the first film in the Irish language to do so.

== See also ==
- Shaw's Road
- Belfast quarters
