= Falls Road, Belfast =

Main road through west Belfast in Northern Ireland

Falls Road
- Irish: Bóthar na bhFál Ulster-Scots: Faas Raa
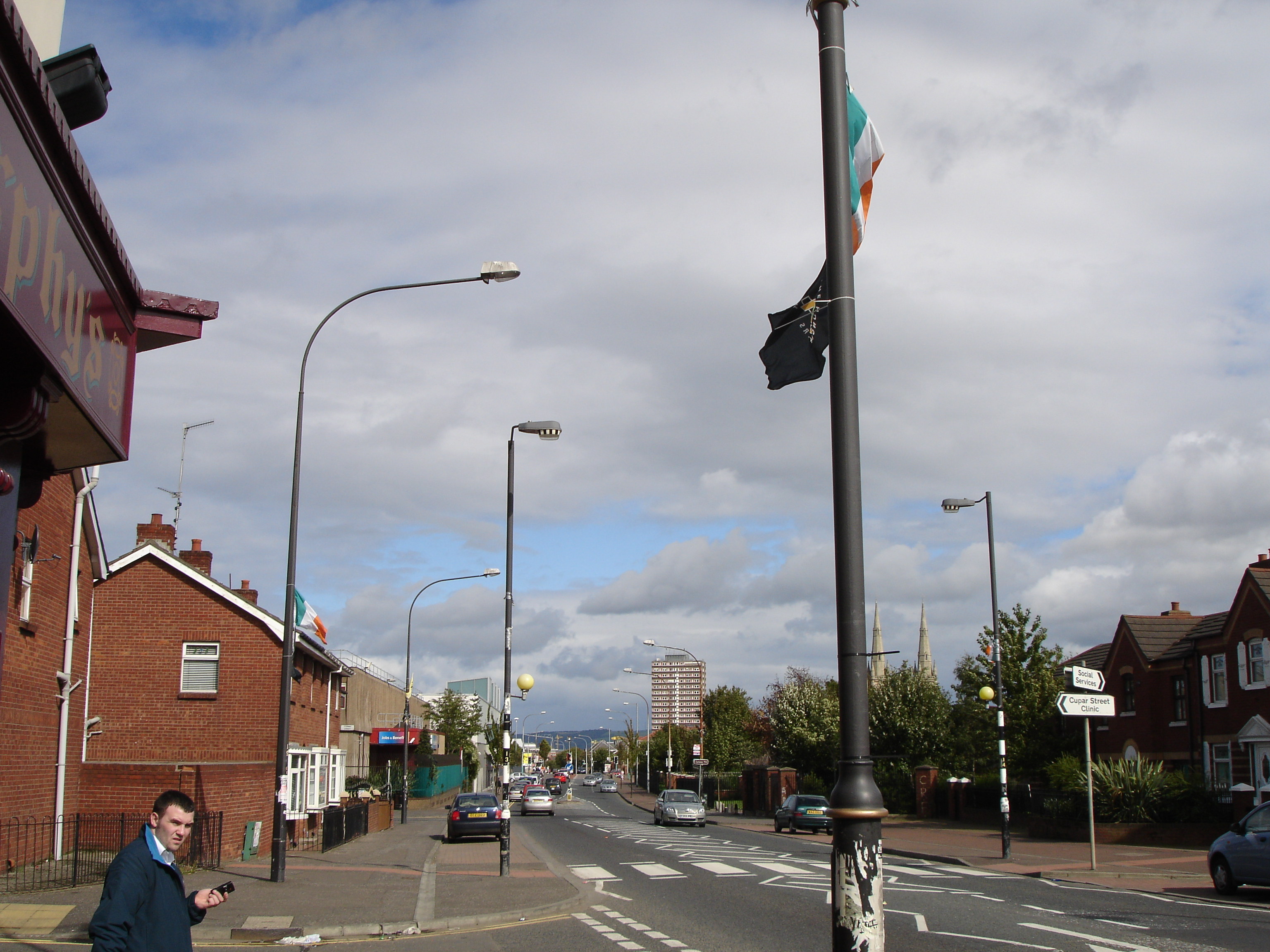
- Falls Road looking towards Divis flats and the city centre

- Location within Greater Belfast
- Native name: Bóthar na bhFál (Irish)
- Maintained by: Belfast City Council
- Length: 1,600 m (5,200 ft)
- Location: Belfast, Northern Ireland
- Postal code: BT12
- Coordinates: 54.59347°N 5.95823°W
- Northeast end: Divis Street
- Southwest end: Andersonstown Road

Other
- Known for: Numerous murals, Irish republican community

The Falls Road (from Irish túath na bhFál 'territory of the enclosures') is the main road through West Belfast, Northern Ireland, running from Divis Street in Belfast City Centre to Andersonstown in the suburbs. The name has been synonymous, for at least a century and a half, with the Catholic community in the city. The road is usually referred to as the Falls Road, rather than as Falls Road. It is known in Irish as the Bóthar na bhFál and as the Faas Raa in Ulster-Scots.

== Location ==
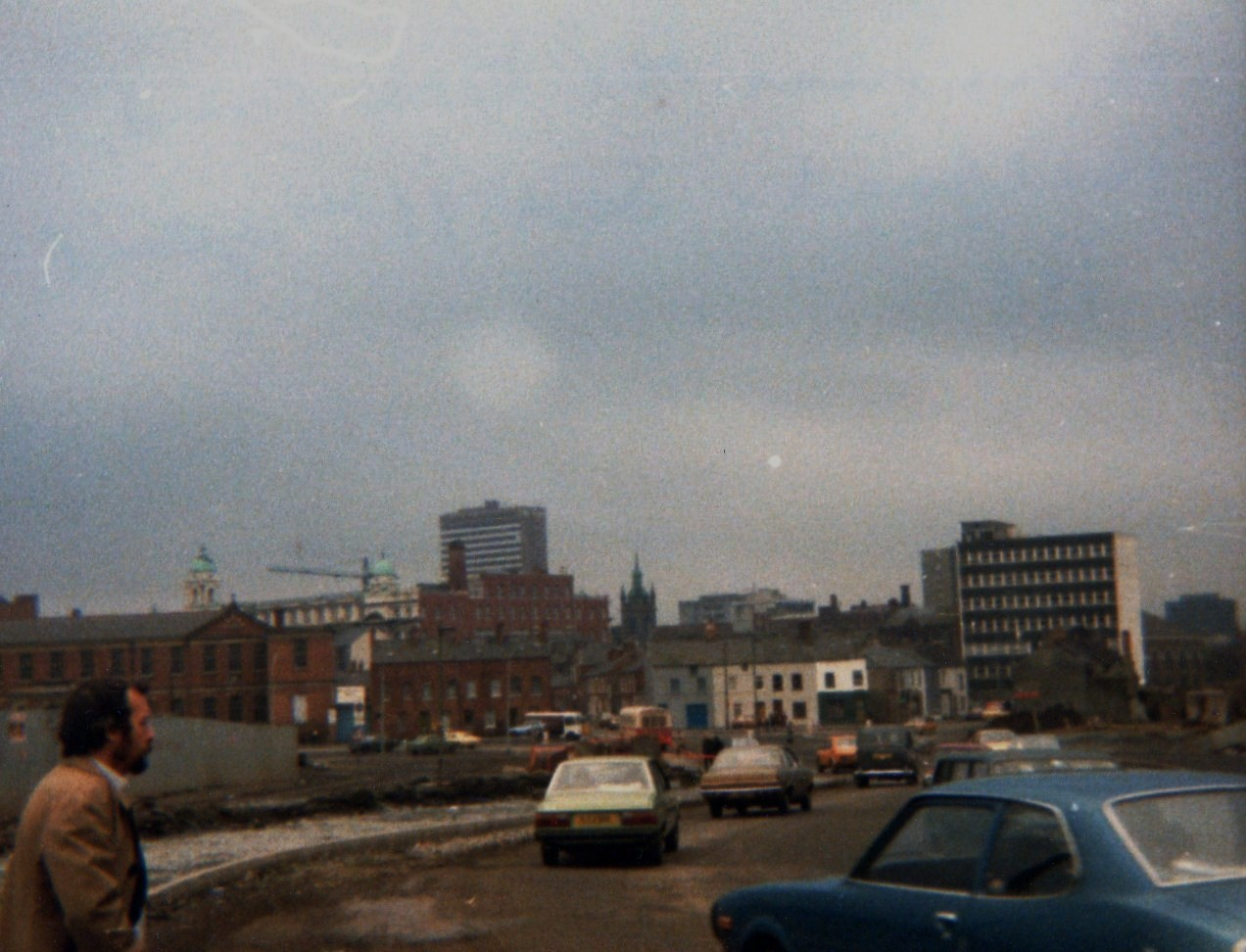
The view from the Falls Road to the city centre, 1981

The Falls Road forms the first three miles of the A501, which starts in Belfast city centre and runs southwest through the city, forking just after the Falls Park into the B102, which continues for a short distance to Andersonstown. The A501 continues as the Glen Road. The area is composed largely of residential housing, with more public sector housing in the lower sections of the road. There are many small shops lining the road, as well as schools, churches, hospitals and leisure facilities. Employment in the area was originally dominated by the large linen mills but these have mostly closed. Today, local employment is in the service sector, health and education with additional employment in other parts of the city.

The Falls Road district can be roughly divided into three sections. The Lower Falls, which includes Divis Street, starts near the city centre and continues to the junction with the Grosvenor Road. The Middle Falls district centres on Beechmount. The Upper Falls starts about the Donegall Road and continues into Andersonstown.

The short stretch of the road from the city centre to the start of Divis Street at Millfield is known as Castle Street, after the former Belfast Castle, which was built nearby by the Normans in the 12th century. Castle Street begins at the junction with Royal Avenue and Donegall Place, the main shopping district of Belfast. Two large buildings flank either side of the entrance to the street. On one side is the Bank Buildings and on the other is the former home of the Anderson & McAuley department store.

Near the start of Castle Street is Chapel Lane, on which St. Mary's Church is situated. This is the oldest Catholic church in Belfast and dates from 1784. Nearby, on Bank Street, is located the historic Kelly's Cellars bar, which dates from 1720. Opposite was located St. Mary's Hall, a popular social venue which was constructed in 1875 and demolished in 1990. Bank Street begins at Royal Avenue. The ornate building at its entrance was the former home of the Provincial Bank of Ireland, which was erected in 1869. When it closed in 1989, the building was occupied until 2021 by a Tesco store. It was then refurbished as a social facility by Belfast City Council.

== History ==
The Falls Road derives its name from the Irish túath na bhFál, an Irish petty kingdom whose name means "territory of the enclosures". These enclosures resulted from the Plantation of Ulster which occurred from the seventeenth century. This territory was roughly the same as that of the ecclesiastical parish of the Shankill, which spanned a large portion of modern-day Belfast.

The road was originally a country lane running east toward Belfast, increasingly populated on either side by Catholics from western districts. Refugees from rural poverty that had been intensified by Belfast's mechanisation of what had been a cottage textile industry and, in the 1840s, by famine, they were drawn to the area by the prospects for women and children of employment in new linen mills. All of these mills have now closed or repurposed. This original area, which was centred on the junction of modern-day Millfield and College Avenue, on what is now Divis Street, was known as Falls and lent its name to the road, which had previously been called The Pound. The housing in the area developed in the 19th century and was organised in narrow streets of small terraced housing. The Westlink, linking the M1 and M2 motorways, now cuts through this area.

== Lower Falls ==
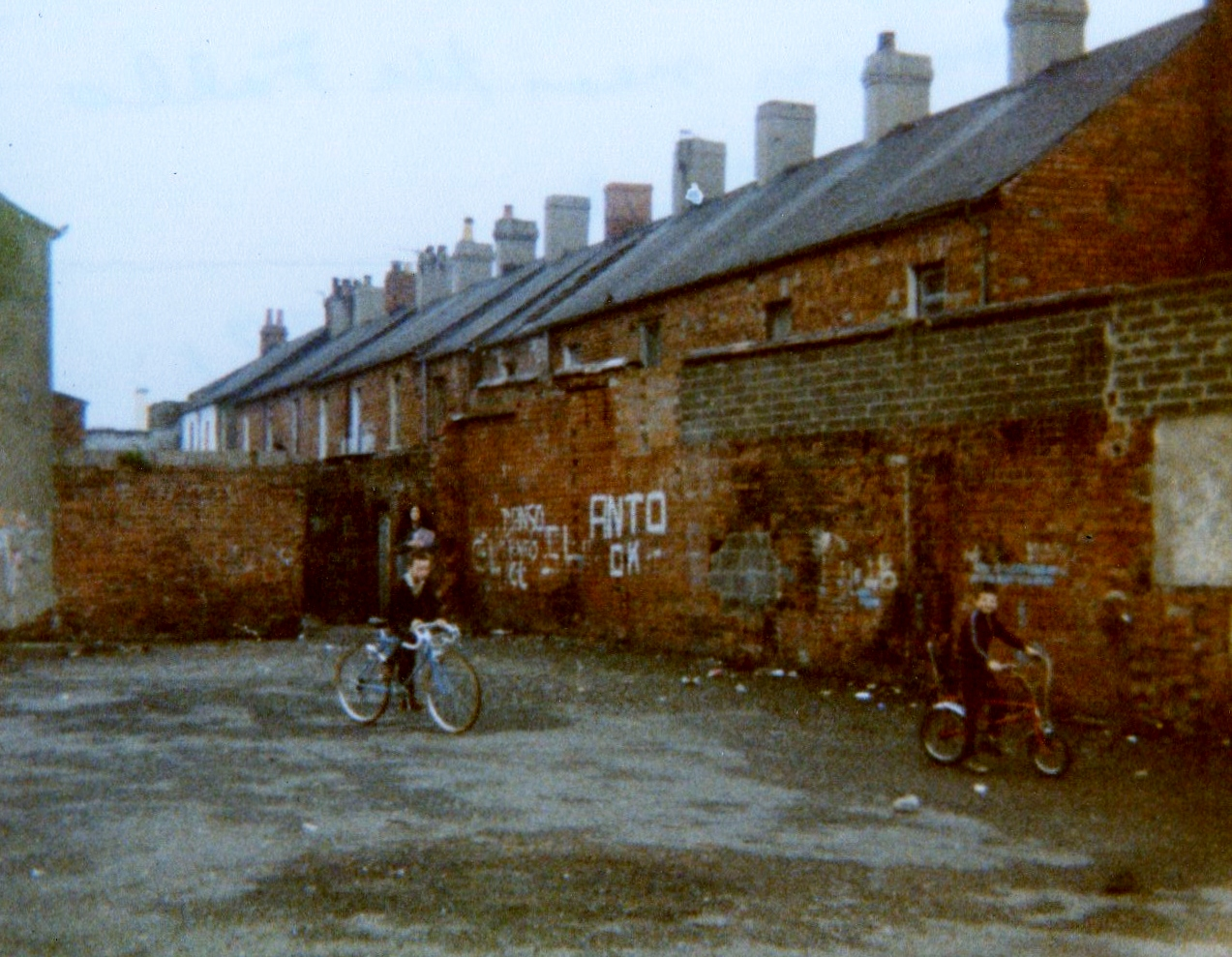
Children playing near Falls Road, Belfast, 1981

This section of the road stretches from the junction of Castle Street and Millfield to the Grosvenor Road/Springfield Road intersection. The lower part of the road is named Divis Street, after the Divis mountain which overlooks much of West Belfast. The Falls Road proper begins at the junction with Northumberland Street and Albert Street. The area to the south of Divis Street/Lower Falls Road was considered the heart of the district, and was initially composed of rows of small terraced houses which were constructed in the mid to late nineteenth century to house mill workers and their families. The area is detailed in the 1931 Ordnance Survey map of the area. Shortly after Millfield, the road crosses over the Westlink (A12) which links three motorways - the M1 to the southwest of the city, the M2 to the north and the M3 to the east. Running alongside the Westlink is Townsend Street, which originally marked the end of Belfast. Townsend Street links Divis Street with Peter's Hill at the bottom of the Shankill Road.

=== Housing ===
The housing in the area developed in the 19th century and was organised in narrow streets of small terraced housing. Many of the streets were named after local mill owners: for example, Alexander Street West was named after John Alexander, who was a local mill owner. He also named Milford Street after Milford Mills, County Carlow where he had a house. Ardmoulin Street was named after Ardmoulin House, the residence of John Chartres of Falls Flax and Weaving Company. Craig Street was named after the Craig family, who owned the New Northern Mill at the corner of Northumberland Street.

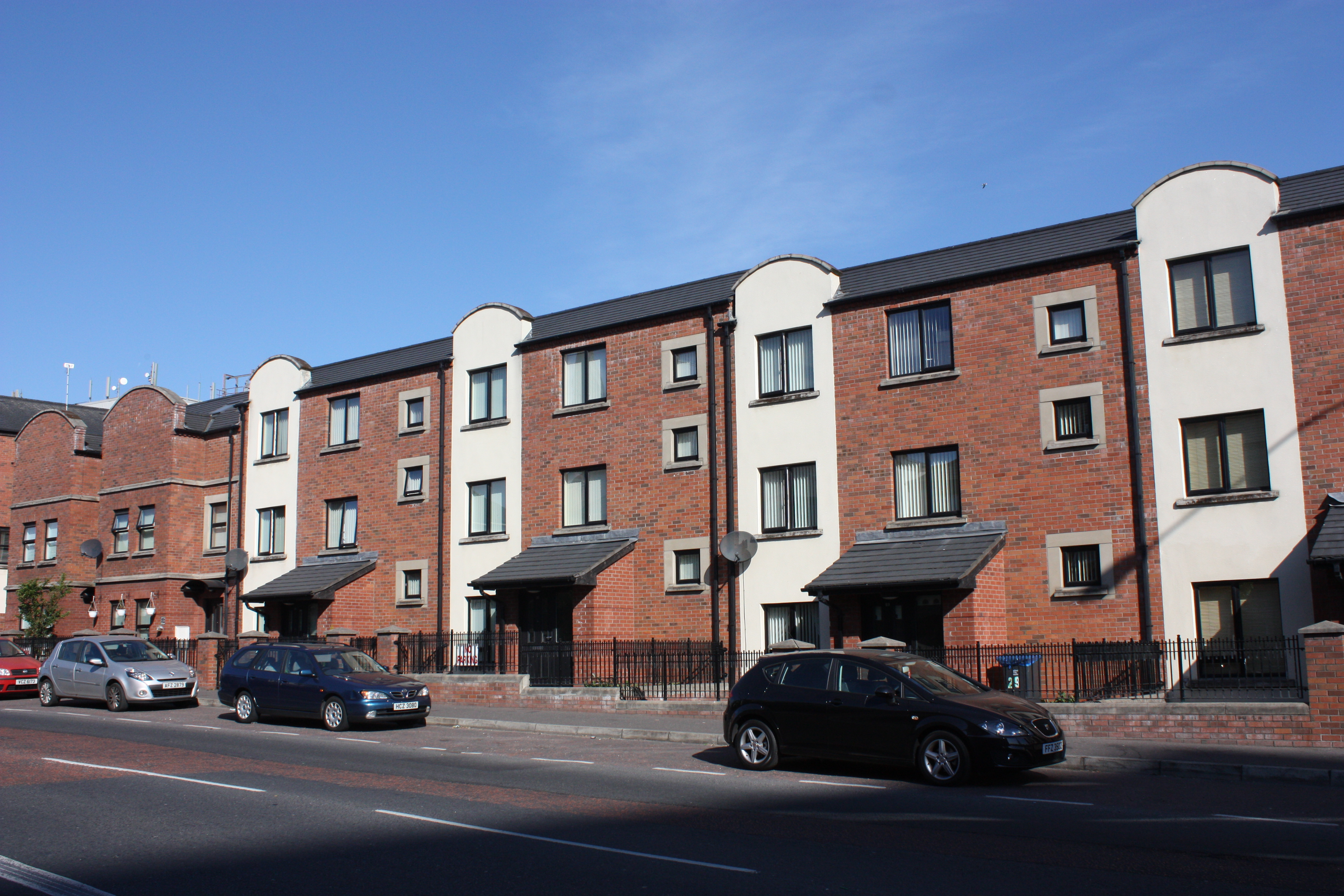
Divis Street, Belfast, May 2011

By the 1960s, the buildings in the area had decayed considerably and the Belfast Corporation introduced a major development plan which involved wholesale demolition of much of the area. Many of the old street names were retained in the new housing development. In the Divis Street area, the housing was replaced with the Divis Flats complex, which consisted of twelve blocks of flats built on top of the historic district formerly known as the Pound Loney. The high point of this redevelopment was Divis Tower. Because of its rapid deterioration, the whole complex, except for Divis Tower, was demolished thirty years later and replaced with blocks of terraced housing.

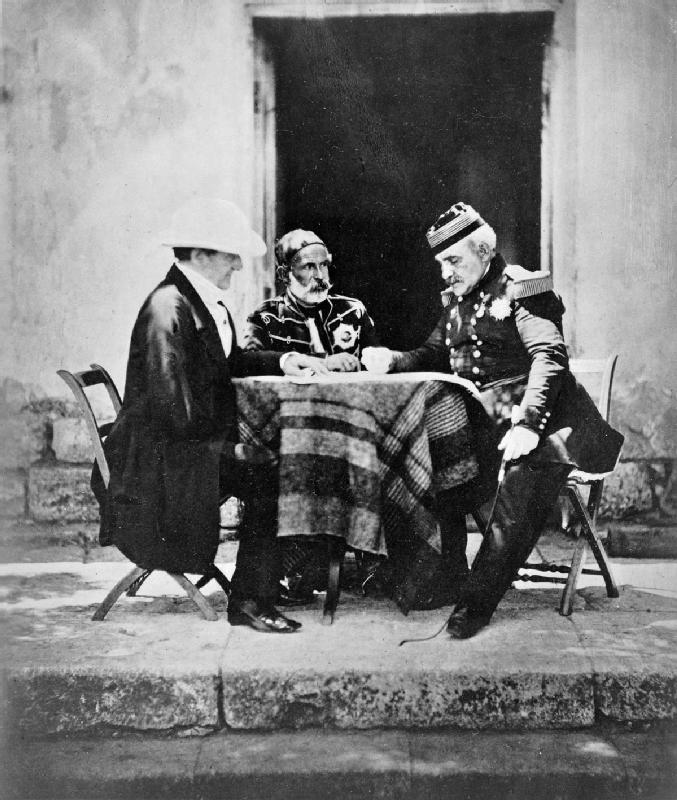
The Crimean War, 1854 – 1856 A morning conference for the allied commanders Lord Raglan, Omar Pasha and Marshal Pelissier

Past Albert Street, more mills were built on the northern side and more streets of small terraced houses on the southern side. The old streets were named after characters and events in the Crimean War (1853–1856) which was occurring at that time. These include Raglan Street (named after Lord Raglan, commander of British forces in the Crimean War), Garnet Street (after Garnet Wolseley, 1st Viscount Wolseley), Alma Street (after the Battle of Alma), Balaklava Street (after the Battle of Balaklava), Inkerman Street (after the Battle of Inkerman), Sevastopol Street (after the Siege of Sevastopol), Plevna Street (after the Siege of Plevna), Varna Street (after the Siege of Varna) as well as Omar Street (after Omar Pasha) and Osman Street (after Osman Nuri Paşa). Some streets were named after Balkan locations, such as Bosnia Street, Balkan Street, Roumania Street and Servia Street. Other streets were named after contemporary political and royal figures, such as Peel Street (after Robert Peel) and Albert Street (named after Prince Albert). Marchioness Street and Lady Street are probably named after Lady Dufferin, the Marchioness of Dufferin and Ava, originally from Killyleagh, who had been the Vicereine of India (1884–1888). These street names are recalled in the collection of poetry The Irish for No by Ciaran Carson. In one of the poems, entitled "The Exiles' Club", Carson imagines a group of Belfast exiles:

After years they have reconstructed the whole of the Falls Road, and now
Are working on the back streets: Lemon, Peel and Omar, Balaclava, Alma.

All of these houses have now been demolished and replaced with modern terraced houses.

At the foot of Divis Street is located the Morning Star House. This is a hostel which provides temporary accommodation for homeless people. It is run by the Legion of Mary and was originally located at the corner of Percy Street. Additional accommodation for homeless people is provided nearby by First Housing at Ardmoulin Mews, off Ardmoulin Street.

=== Schools ===
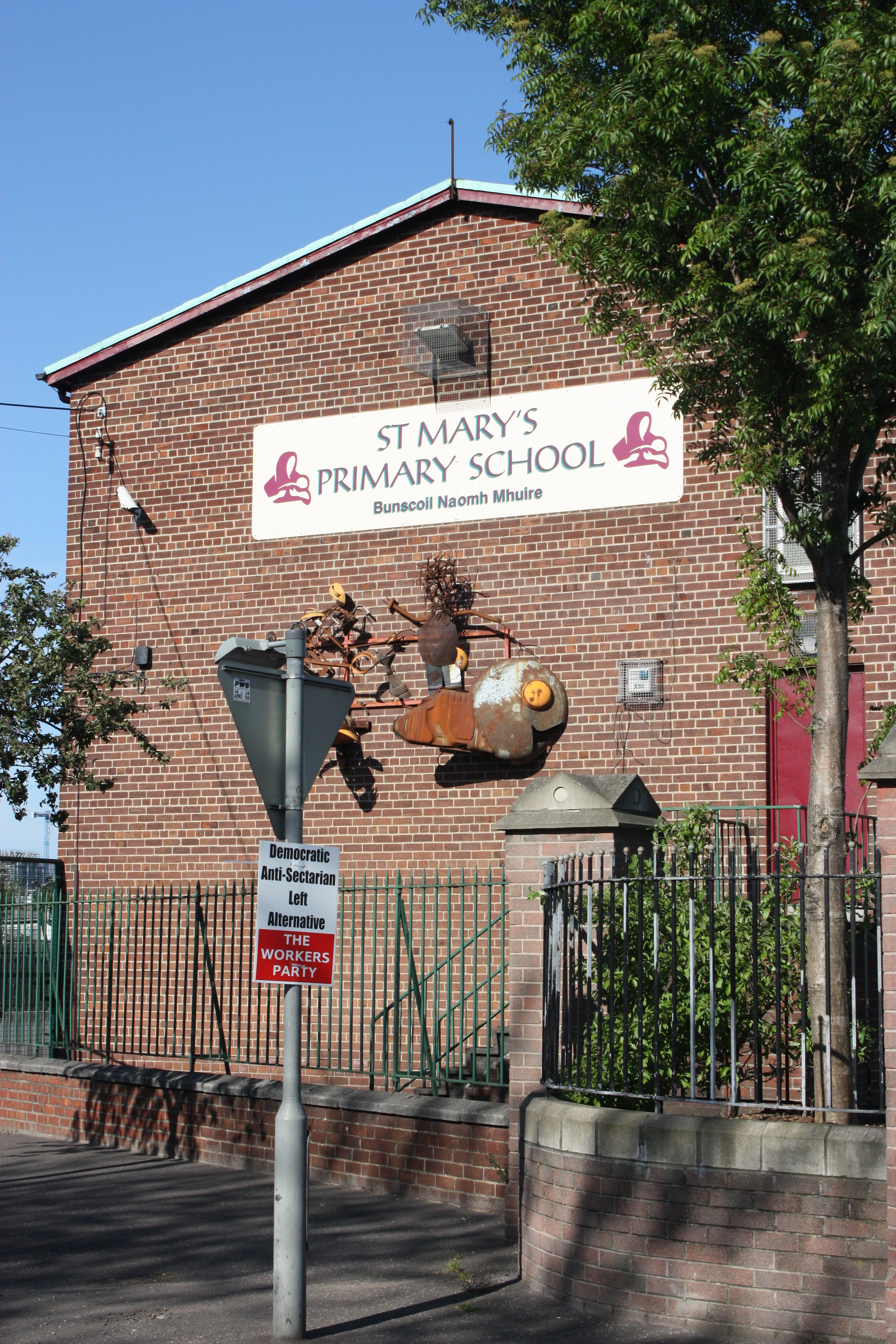
St. Mary's Primary School, Belfast, May 2011

At the foot of Divis Street is located the Millfield campus of Belfast Metropolitan College, the largest further and higher education college in Northern Ireland. Nearby was located the original St. Mary's Christian Brothers' Grammar School. In the 1960s, this school transferred to a greenfield site on the Glen Road in the Upper Falls. The original school building is now the home of the Edmund Rice Schools Trust. Opposite is St. Mary's Primary School. Nearby is the location of the Árd Scoil, which was historically the centre for Irish language and culture in the area. Just past it was located the Hastings Street RUC station.

There are currently two other primary schools in the Lower Falls district. These are St. Peter's on Ross Road and St. Joseph's on Slate Street. In addition, there is the Irish language Gaelscoil an Lonnáin, which occupies the site of St Finian's Primary School at the top end of Leeson Street. St Finian's School, and the nearby St. Gall's Primary School, closed in the late twentieth century due to declining student numbers. These schools were run by the De La Salle Christian Brothers. The name of the latter school survives in the name of St. Galls' Avenue. St Comgall's Public Elementary School, in Divis Street, opened in 1932 anc closed in 1988. It has been transformed into a community hub for a range of community and business activities and is involved in the development of a Visitor Heritage Interpretation Space for the area. The centre is named Ionad (Centre) Eileen Howell after a local community activist. The Falls Community Council (Comhairle Phobail na bhFal) is based in the centre. It provides a range of local services and is committed to the regeneration of the area. St. Brendan's Primary School, on nearby Milford Street, closed in the 1960s but, for two years, housed some pupils from St. Mary's Christian Brothers' Grammar School which, at that time, had exceeded its capacity in its Barrack Street premises.

The Dunlewey Centre is located near Gaelscoil an Lonnáin. The building was originally the home of the Bon Secours Sisters and also housed St. Vincent's Primary School for Girls. It is a now the home of a community education centre. Dunlewey Street, on which it is located, is named after the residence of a local mill owner, William Ross, who owned a house in Dunlewey, County Donegal. The nearby Ross Road is also named after William Ross.

=== Churches ===
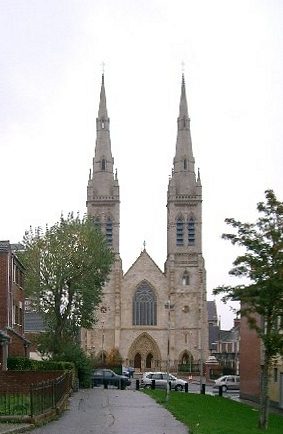
St Peter's Cathedral

The churches in the Lower Falls district reflect the changing demographics of the area. There are three Catholic churches in the area. The oldest is St. Mary's Church, which opened in 1784 (see above). St Peter's Cathedral is located just off Albert Street. This was originally a parish church built for the expanding Catholic population in the area and opened in 1866. It was designed by Fr Jeremiah Ryan McAulay, who had trained as an architect before he became a priest, and built on a site donated by a local baker, Bernard Hughes. It became the cathedral church for the Roman Catholic Diocese of Down and Connor and the episcopal seat of the Bishop of Down and Connor in 1986. It is home to St Peter's Schola Cantorum (Choir). Clonard monastery, the home of the Redemptorist religious order, is located near the junction with Springfield Road. The church formally opened in 1911, replacing a small church which opened in 1897. Father Alec Reid, who played an important role in the Northern Ireland peace process, was based here.

There were, at one point, seven Protestant churches, which were largely located on the edges of the area, and their congregations were mostly drawn from neighbouring districts. All but one of the older churches have been closed, repurposed or demolished since the onset of the Troubles and the establishment of the peace lines. There were three Church of Ireland churches. St. Luke's Church (1863–2006) on Northumberland Street, was the Church of Ireland church for the Lower Falls. When it closed, its congregation amalgamated with St. Stephen's Church in Millfield at the foot of Divis Street. This church, which opened in 1856, was designed by Sir Thomas Drew who also designed St. Anne's Cathedral and many other churches. St Philips Church (Drew Memorial) opened on the Grosvenor Road in 1870. It was named after the fiery preacher, Rev. Dr. Thomas Drew, who hailed from Limerick and became a very influential clergyman when he moved to Belfast. It closed in 1994 and the church congregation merged with that of St. Simon's Church on the Donegall Road. A war memorial from the church is preserved in the Somme Museum, Newtownards. The church was sold to Dwyer's Gaelic Athletic Club, who built their clubrooms on the site.

There were two Presbyterian churches. The largest was located on the other side of the peace wall dividing Townsend Street, which links Divis Street with Peter's Hill, the lower Shankill Road. It opened in 1878 and formally closed in 2022, when it was taken over as a rehearsal space by the Ulster Orchestra. Nearby was located the Soho Foundry, established by Robert Shipboy MacAdam in 1846. It is now an enterprise centre. There was also a Presbyterian church in Albert Street (1852–1972), where one of the ministers was the Rev. Henry Montgomery who helped establish the Shankill Road Mission in 1896. The Maureen Sheehan Centre is now located on the site of the church. The centre is named after a local community nurse who was killed in a nearby car accident. Four sculptures from the church are featured in the facade of the centre.

There was also a Methodist church in Divis Street (1850–1966). This church was designed by Charles Lanyon and was the original home of the Falls Road Orange Lodge.

A recent addition is the New Life City Church, which is located on Northumberland Street on the peace line marking the separation of the Falls Road and the Shankill Road. It is an Elim Pentecostal Church.

=== Commercial facilities ===
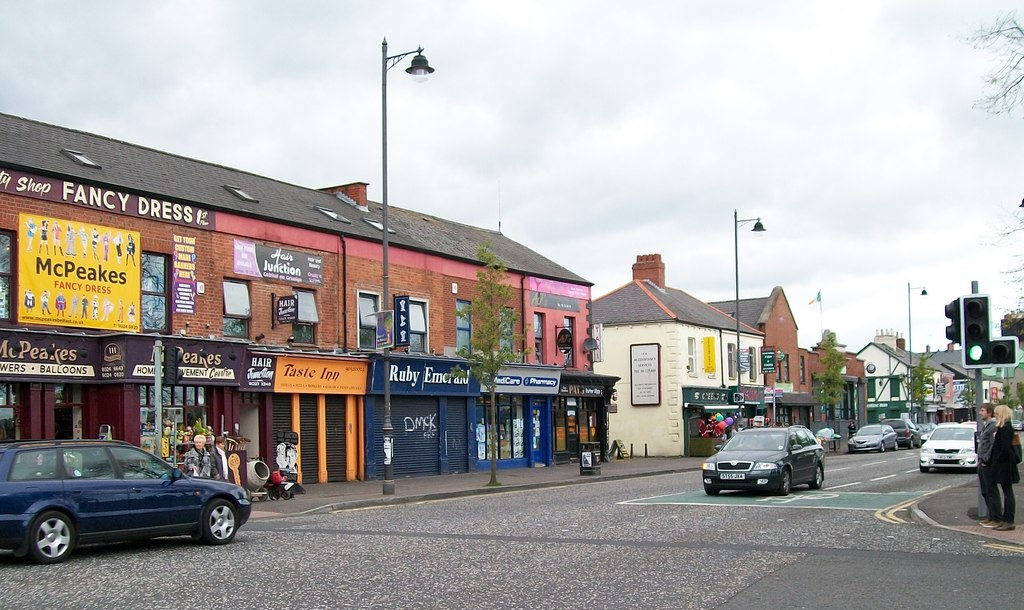
A row of small shops on the Falls Road

The Lower Falls area previously had many linen mills. These have either been demolished or converted for other purposes. The Twin Spires Complex has replaced the demolished massive mill of the New Northern Spinning and Weaving Company (Craig's Mill), which was located at the corner of Northumberland Street. The new complex consists of shops, offices and small industrial units. On the corner of Conway Street was located Greeves' Mill (whose original owner was Thomas Greeves of Strandtown, Belfast) and the Conway Mill (whose original owner was James Kennedy of nearby Clonard). Originally a flax spinning mill, it now houses a community enterprise of small businesses, art studios, retail space and education floor. It also houses the Irish Republican History Museum. Finally, Ross's Mill was located on Clonard Street, with an entrance at the top of Sevastopol Street. It has been demolished and replaced by housing, but its name survives in the street name Ross Mill Avenue.

There are still two large flour mills located in the Lower Falls district. Near the bottom of Divis Street is located Neill's Flour Mill, which is entered via College Square North. This mill was originally a small stone mill, but was taken over by James Neill in 1867, who converted it into a roller mill in 1880. This mill grew in size and, in the 1960s, it became part of Allied Mills, which in turn became part of Associated British Foods. The original mill was then demolished and rebuilt in 1986–7. Between Northumberland Street and Percy Street is located Andrews Flour Mill. The mill was originally developed in 1895 by the Andrews family from Comber, County Down. J. M. Andrews was the second Prime Minister of Northern Ireland (1940–1943). Northumberland Street and Percy Street were named after Hugh Percy, 3rd Duke of Northumberland, who was the Lord Lieutenant of Ireland from 1829–1830. Percy Street was badly damaged in the Belfast Blitz of 1941, and 30 people were killed when a bomb hit a shelter. In August 1969, Percy Street and the neighbouring Dover Street were the location for major disturbance, when a large crowd of Loyalists from the Shankill Road end attempted to invade Divis Street. Houses in the street were attacked and the residents fled (see 1969 Northern Ireland riots). These mills recruited workers from both the Falls and Shankill Roads.

The Hungarian Flour Mill was a large, eight-storey flour mill, situated at the foot of Divis Street. It was erected in the nineteenth century by Bernard Hughes. The mill burned down in a fire in 1966.

=== Leisure facilities ===
The Falls Leisure Centre is located in the Lower Falls district. It currently offers a range of leisure facilities, including a swimming pool, sauna and steam rooms, a gym, and a badminton court. It was originally the location of the Falls Public Baths, where local residents could avail of washing and swimming facilities. On 16 April 1941, it was the site of a temporary morgue following the Belfast Blitz. This is described in the novel The Emperor of Ice-Cream by the novelist Brian Moore.

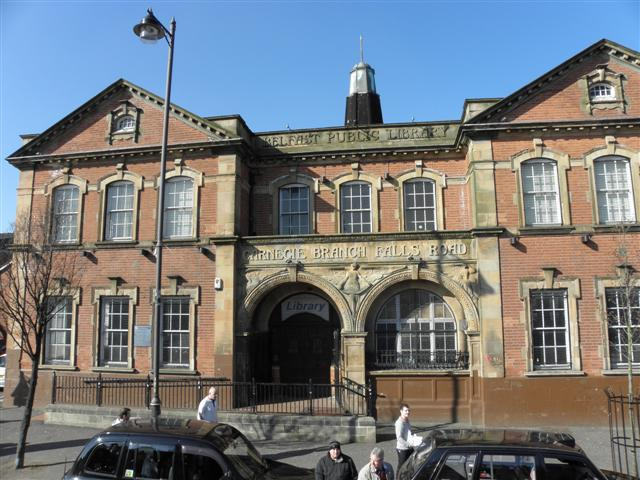
Falls Road Library, opened in 1908.

One of three Carnegie libraries built in Belfast is situated in the Lower Falls Road. It opened on 1 January 1908, and is the last Carnegie library in Belfast still functioning as a library. Opposite was located the Clonard Picture House which closed in 1966. The Diamond Picture House, at the corner of Cupar Street, closed in 1959. The Arcadian Cinema, on Albert Street, opened in 1912 and closed in 1960.

At the junction with Grosvenor Road is located Dunville Park, which was first opened in 1893. It was funded by Robert G Dunville, the owner of the nearby Dunville & Co whiskey distillery, who also funded the large fountain at the centre of the park, which was designed by the English sculptor Arthur Ernest Pearce. Sorella Street, at the foot of the park, is named after the Sorella Trust, which was established by Robert's uncle William Dunville, who named the trust after his sister (Italian: sorella), Sarah. The park has recently been refurbished and includes a football pitch. Nearby are located the clubrooms of Davitt's GAC and Dwyer's GAC.

A strong working class community, the Lower Falls has a history of storytelling, music and song, which was often enjoyed in the many public houses in the area. These included such establishments as the Old House (famous for its folk music sessions), McGeown's, the West End Bar (famous for its weekend sing-songs), the Laurel Leaf and the Centre Half and Haughey's. Gerry Conlon, who grew up in Peel Street, recalled in his autobiography, Proved Innocent, how he could see several pubs just a few yards from his front door: I'd watch the men off to the pubs. There were three pubs, Paddy Gilmartin's which was called the Laurel Leaf, Peter Murray's [the West End Bar] directly opposite, or further down on the right-hand side was Charlie Gormley's, across from Finnegan's the butcher shop. The Centre Half Bar, which was located at the corner of Panton Street and the Falls Road, was named by the licensee Mickey Hamill, who played for both Belfast Celtic and Glasgow Celtic, as well as Manchester United and Manchester City. He captained the Ireland team to their first Home International championship win in 1914. The Spanish Rooms bar, in lower Divis Street, was famed for selling scrumpy, especially to young men on their way to a dance. In the early 1970s, it was the largest seller of cider in Britain and Ireland. Most of these bars were demolished as part of the redevelopment of the area which occurred in the 1970s and 1980s.

Near the foot of Divis Street is located the offices of Raidió Fáilte, an Irish language community radio station. It is housed in a purpose-built facility. Nearby, on the Cullingtree Road, is located the Frank Gillen Centre, which offers a range of community services. Closer to the city centre, in College Court, off Castle Street, was located the Astor Ballroom, which was a very popular dance venue in the 1960s, and where such famous bands as Thin Lizzy and Them performed.

=== Murals and memorials ===
On some walls along the main road have been painted large murals. These are representations of local and national political issues and figures. One of the most famous is the large mural of Bobby Sands on the side wall of the Sinn Féin's offices at the corner of Sevastopol Street. It bears the quotation from his writings: our revenge will be the laughter of our children. Further down the road, on the corner of Northumberland Street, is a series of murals which have come to be called the International or Solidarity Wall. This is a series of images of international figures who have been involved in various liberation struggles. These murals have become a popular attraction for visiting tourists. The murals are frequently updated to reflect local support for certain individuals and groups (e.g. NHS staff). In 2023, a panel on the wall calling for an immediate ceasefire in Gaza was unveiled. There are many other murals on nearby gable walls, frequently exhorting peace and reconciliation between communities. One in Bread Street, off Albert Street, has a quotation from Audre Lorde: It is not our differences that divide us. It is our inability to recognize, accept and celebrate those differences.

Opposite the junction with Conway Street is a Garden of Remembrance. This is dedicated to the members of the IRA and the civilians from the Falls Road area who were killed during the Troubles, and the prisoners in the H Block at the Long Kesh prison who died while on hunger strike in 1981.

== Middle Falls ==
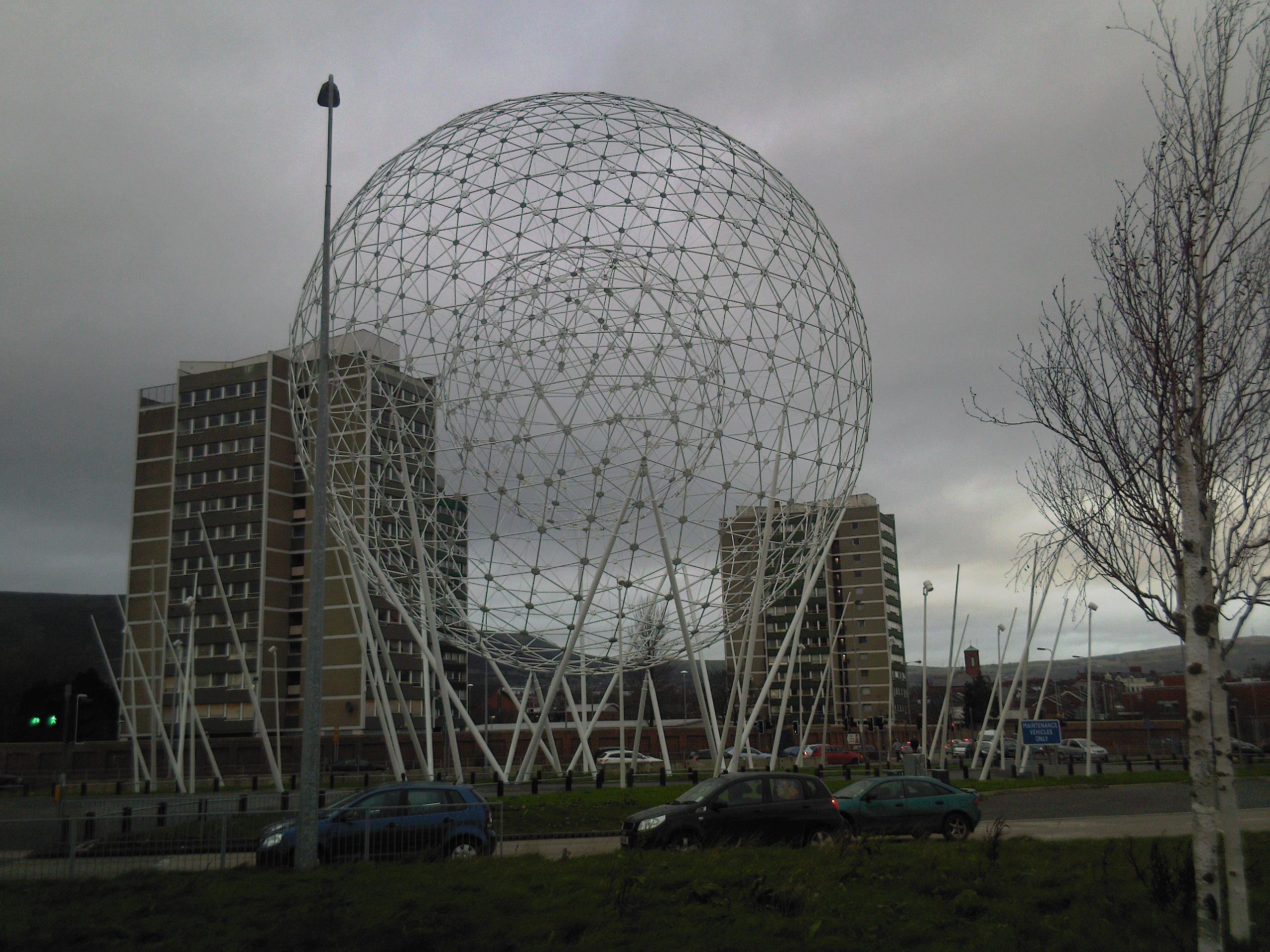
Rise Belfast

This section of the road centres on the Beechmount district and stretches from the intersection with the Grosvenor Road/Springfield Road to the Whiterock Road. The district takes its name from Beechmount House, which was located at the top of a nearby hill, surrounded by beech trees. It was the former home of Eliza and Isabella Riddel. It is now the site of an Irish Language school.

The Whiterock Road leads to the Ballymurphy and to Turf Lodge districts. It also leads to the Black Mountain, which forms part of the range of hills overlooking Belfast. Across the Falls Road from the Whiterock Road is the Donegall Road. This road leads down to the junction with Broadway and Westlink – M1 motorway, and then on down to Shaftesbury Square in the city centre. At the junction with Westlink is located the large public sculpture, formally called RISE but informally known as The Balls on the Falls.

Through the area flowed the Clowney Water or River (Irish: Abhainn na Cluana – River of the meadow) which is a tributary of the larger Blackstaff River. Both have largely been covered over and piped in.

=== Hospitals ===
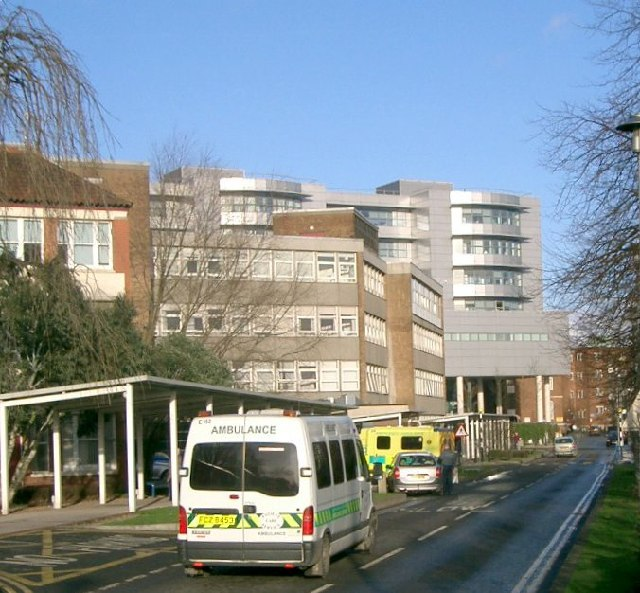
Royal Victoria Hospital, Belfast

There are several large hospitals in the area, including the Royal Victoria Hospital, the Royal Jubilee Maternity Service, the Royal Belfast Hospital for Sick Children (Children's Hospital), and the Royal Dental Hospital. These four linked hospitals make up Northern Ireland's biggest hospitals complex. The Royal Victoria Hospital treats over 80,000 inpatients and 350,000 outpatients every year. The complex is a major training site for medical, dental, nursing and other health students from Queen's University Belfast. The original hospital opened in 1797 and moved to its present site in 1903. The hospital was designed by Henman and Cooper of Birmingham in 1899 and was completed in 1906. It was claimed to be the first air-conditioned public building in the world.

Opposite the Children's Hospital is Mulholland Terrace, a row of terraced houses which were built in the nineteenth century by David Mulholland. He also owned several bars in the area.

=== Schools ===
There are several educational institutions in the district. At the primary level, St. Paul's Primary School is located in the Beechmount area. There are also two Irish language primary schools: Gaelscoil na bhFal and Bunscoil an tSléibhe Dhuibh.

At the senior level, there is St Dominic's Grammar School for Girls. Beside it was located St. Catherine's Primary School, which was also run by the Dominican nuns and closed in 2005. At the rear was located St Rose's High School in the Beechmount district which, in 2019, was amalgamated with the Christian Brothers School, Glen Road and Corpus Christi College to form All Saints College / Coláiste na Naomh Uile.

There were several boys secondary schools in the area, which have gone through a process of merging over the past forty years. St. Thomas's Boys Secondary School, on the Whiterock Road, opened in 1957. St. Peter's Boys Secondary School, on Brittons Parade, opened in the 1960s. In 1988, both of these schools amalgamated with Gort na Móna Secondary School to become Corpus Christi College which in turn merged in 2019. St. Thomas's had a strong literary heritage. For a period, its headteacher was the writer Michael McLaverty. In addition, Seamus Heaney taught here for a while in the 1960s. He references the area in one of his poems:

Is there life before death? That's chalked up
In Ballymurphy. Competence with pain,
Coherent miseries, a bite and a sup,
We hug our little destiny again.

Brendan Hamill, another writer who attended the school in the 1960s, recalled later: While on teaching practice, Seamus Heaney came to St Thomas' about October that year (1962). I remember him, his voice grave and resonant, his big, brown shoes, reading from Carrickfergus by Louis MacNeice. He was an enormously decent man with extraordinary antennae. Joe Graham, the writer and historian, was also a student at the school when McLaverty was the headteacher. For several years after the school closed, the building was used by Belfast Metropolitan College for further education courses. After the new Springvale campus of the college was opened, the building was demolished.

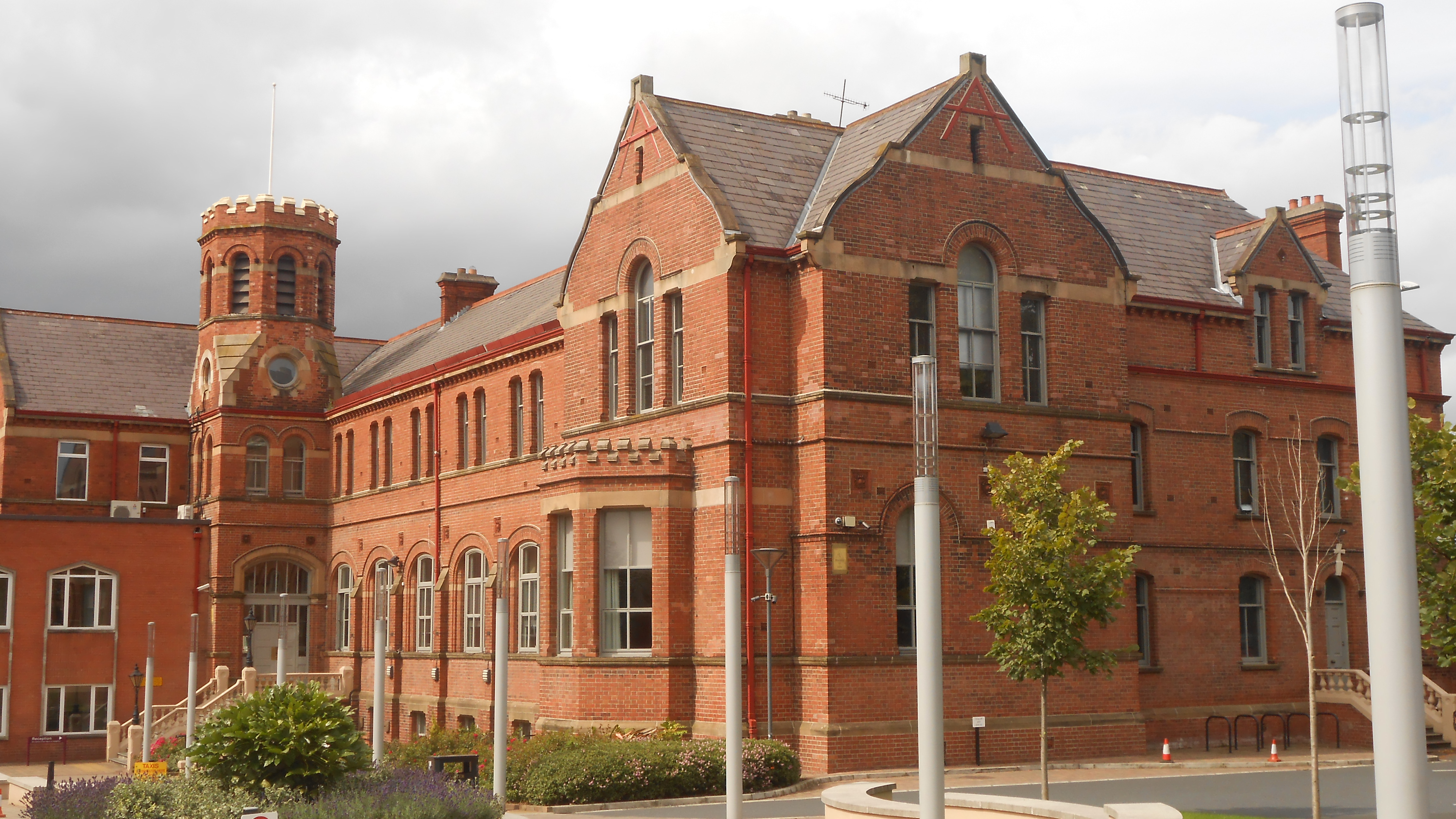
St Mary's University College

Coláiste Feirste is an Irish language secondary school which is situated near Beechmount, in the former home of the Riddel family. Mo Chara, from the Belfast-based hip hop trio Kneecap, attended this school.

At the higher education level, there is St Mary's University College which is part of Queen's University Belfast. This was established in 1909 as St Mary's Training College to train women as teachers. It amalgamated with St Joseph's Training College (for male trainee teachers) in 1985. Besides teacher training, it now offers a range of degree courses. The college has a substantial programme of community engagement, playing host to many local events including many organised by Féile an Phobail.

=== Churches ===
St Paul's Church is located opposite the hospitals on the corner of Cavendish Street. It was built as a chapel of ease to St Peter's Cathedral and celebrated its first Mass in July 1887. St.Paul's was raised from "a district of St Peters" to the status of a parish in 1905. Broadway Presbyterian Church opened in 1891 and closed in 1982. It has since been repurposed as an Irish language arts and culture centre (see below).

=== Recreation and culture ===
Near Beechmount is located Willowbank Park, which has a number of playing fields. It is located on the site of the Willowbank Huts which, in the late nineteenth century, housed a small British Army barracks. When the huts were vacated, they were used by various groups including Fianna Éireann. Corrigan Park, which is a facility for Gaelic games, is located on the Whiterock Road. A nearby smaller facility for various sporting activities is McCrory Park. It was named after Cardinal Joseph MacRory, who was Bishop of Down and Connor and then Primate of All Ireland in the early part of the twentieth century. During the 1970s, it was occupied by the British Army who called it Fort Pegasus. The playing fields of the Davitt's GAC are located in Beechmount. The Whiterock Leisure Centre is located off the upper Whiterock Road. It has a community garden and allotment site. Developments include a playground and multi-use games area. At the foot of St. James's Road, and sandwiched between Rodney Parade and the M1 motorway, is located the St. James's Community Farm. This was an abandoned piece of land that was transformed by local residents into a community farm, providing facilities for around 50 animals and various gardening initiatives.

Historically, there has been a continuing interest in the Irish language and culture in the area. In 1936, the Cluain Árd centre was established in the Beechmount area and became a centre for Irish language enthusiasts. In the 1960s, there was a resurgence of interest in the Irish language reflected in the development of the Shaw's Road Gaeltacht in Andersonstown. Since then, interest has grown, with the approval by Belfast City Council of a Gaeltacht Quarter around the Falls Road in 2002. The Cultúrlann McAdam Ó Fiaich, known colloquially as the Cultúrlann, is an Irish language and arts centre based in the Middle Falls area, which opened in 1991. It was originally the home of Broadway Presbyterian church. The centre also houses the Irish language bookshop An Ceathrú Póilí. The Féile an Phobail, an annual festival of Irish culture, established in 1988, provides a showcase for Irish culture. Nearby, at the corner with Broadway, is the new Áras na bhFál, the home of Iontaobhas na Gaelscolaíochta – the Trust Fund for Irish-Medium Education.

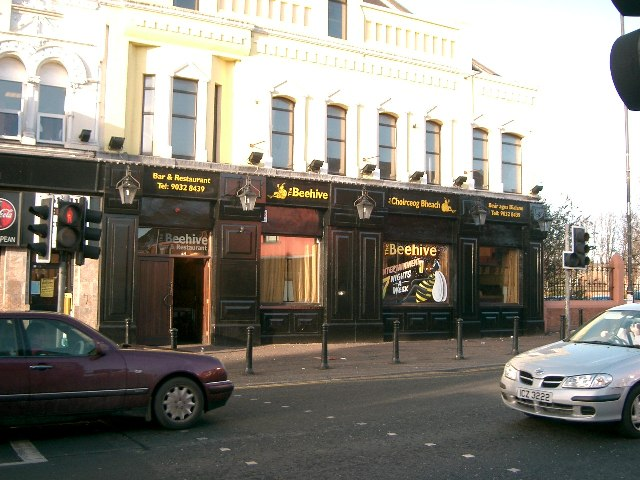
The Beehive Bar, Falls Road

The Áras Uí Chonghaile (James Connolly Visitor Centre) is located near the top of the Donegall Road. This centre is dedicated to the life and work of James Connolly, who lived nearby for a period in the early years of the twentieth century.

There are several large bars in the middle Falls area. These include the Beehive and the Red Devil – An Diabhal Dearg, at the top of Broadway, and the Rock Bar at the top of the Donegall Road. The Rock Bar is described as the oldest bar on the Falls Road. It was subjected to a loyalist attack with an RPG rocket in 1994 but survived and no customers were injured.

The Broadway Cinema, which was situated near Beechmount, was the largest of Belfast's suburban cinemas when it opened in 1936. It closed in 1972 after a bombing. Nearby is the Ionad Mhná na bhFál (Falls Women's Centre), which was established in 1982.

On the Donegall Road lies the former site of Celtic Park. This was originally a football stadium and the home of Belfast Celtic F.C. It was also the first greyhound racing track to open in Ireland. The stadium closed in 1983 and is now the site of a shopping centre.

== Upper Falls ==
This section stretches from the Whiterock Road to the Andersonstown Road. As its name implies, the Andersonstown Road leads to the Andersonstown district and then out of the city. At the junction with the Glen Road was located the Andersonstown RUC Station which was the most attacked police station in Northern Ireland. It was closed and demolished in 2005. The Glen Road runs for almost three miles, passing the junction with Monagh By Pass/Kennedy Way, then Shaw's Road and Suffolk Road, until it changes name to Colinglen Road. For much of the route, it forms the northern boundary of Andersonstown and then Lenadoon.

=== Schools ===
St. Louise's Comprehensive College, which was one of the largest girls schools in Europe with over 2,000 pupils, is located in this area. In 2019, it was decided that it would admit boys and reduce the overall student numbers to 1,500. Nearby is located St. Kevin's Primary School, which was established in 1933. There is also the St. Maria Goretti Nursery School on the Whiterock Road.

=== Churches ===
St. John's RC Church is located near the foot of the Whiterock Road. It was originally established in 1928 as the population of the area increased.

St. Matthias's Church is located on the Glen Road, not far from Milltown Cemetery. The original Church of Ireland church was erected there in 1892 and formally closed in 1969, but was taken over by the Catholic parish of St Teresa of Ávila, whose main church is located further up the Glen Road. The building reopened as a Catholic church under the same name in 1970. A new Catholic church opened on the site in 2004 and the old tin church, which is listed, is in a state of disrepair.

=== Recreation ===
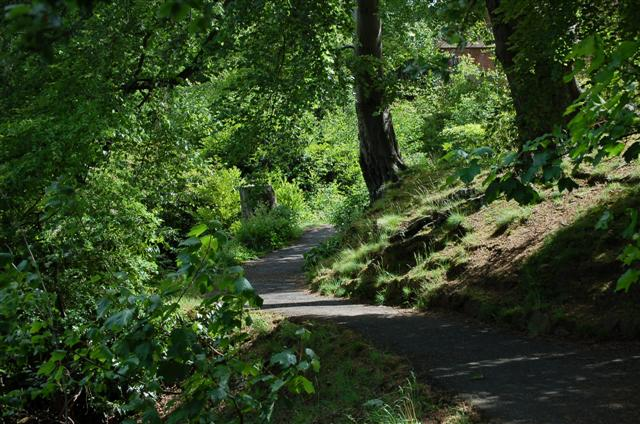
The Falls Park

In the Upper Falls area is located the Falls Park, which was established in 1873. The park has many mature trees, flower beds, horticultural displays and grassland areas. The park contains playing fields for Gaelic games and soccer. It has a 3G pitch, a bowling green and other facilities. Developments include an outdoor gym, a dedicated youth area suitable for a range of uses and a refurbished play park with modern play equipment. In 1924, an outdoor swimming pool, known locally as The Cooler, was added to the park. The pool closed in 1979 for public health reasons. The Féile an Phobail has its closing concert here each year.

Opposite the Falls Park, on Milltown Row, are located the facilities of St. Gall's GAC. Further up the Falls Road is located The Felons, a large social club and restaurant. It is located on the site of a former Methodist meeting house.

=== Cemeteries ===
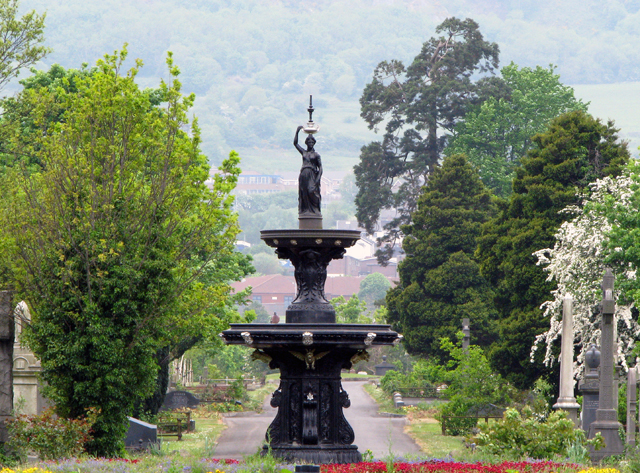
Belfast City Cemetery

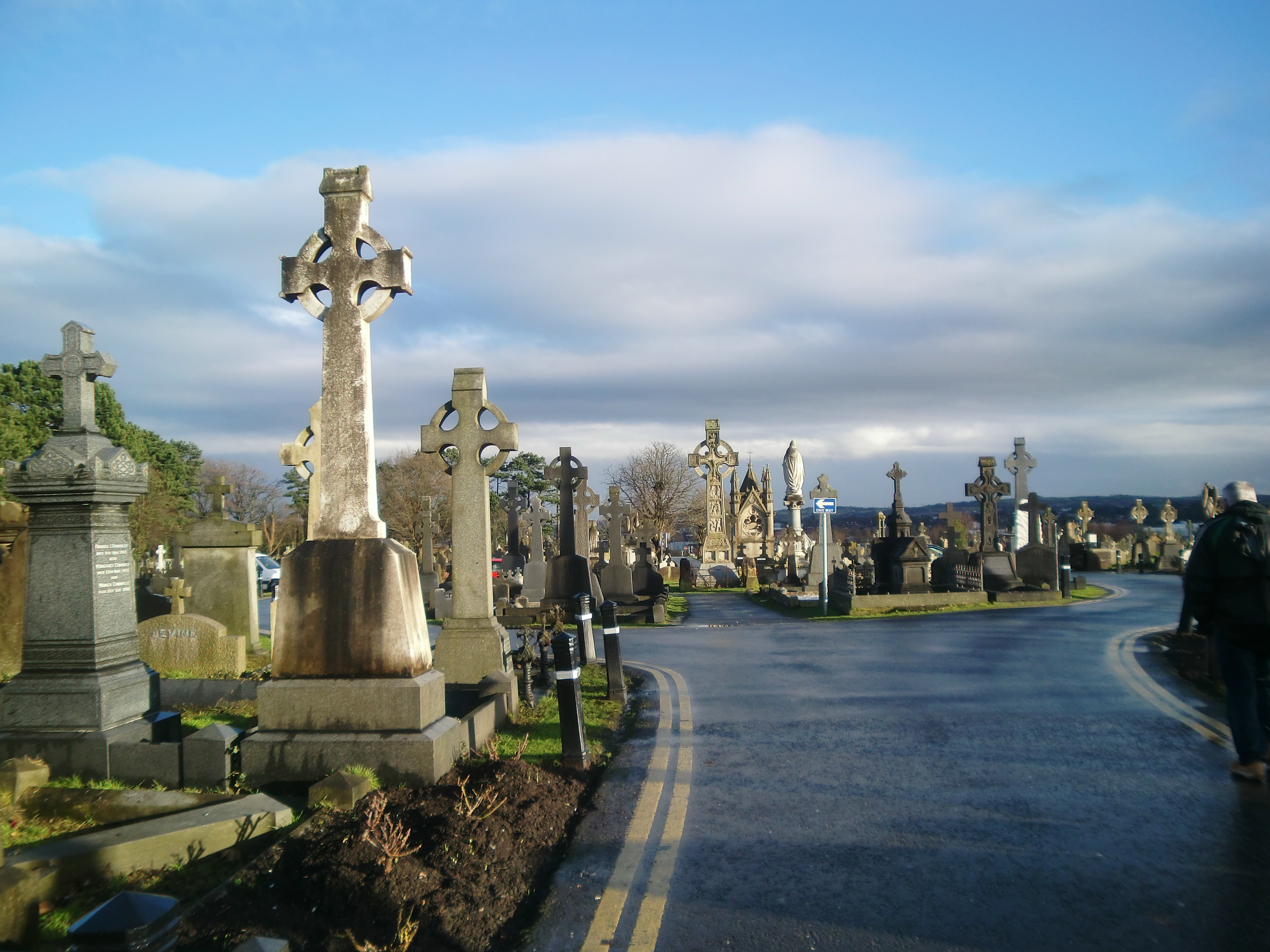
Belfast Milltown Cemetery

In the late 19th century, with the rapid increase in the city population, there was an increasing need for cemeteries. At that time, the Upper Falls was a rural area and the city council and the Catholic Church decided to buy large spaces in the area to create cemeteries. The Belfast City Cemetery, which is located at the bottom of the Whiterock Road, is a municipal cemetery maintained by the Belfast City Council and is one of the largest burial sites in the city. It opened in 1869. At the junction with the Glen Road is located Milltown Cemetery, maintained by the Catholic Church, which opened in the same year.

At the bottom of Milltown Cemetery is the Bog Meadows, which leads onto the M1 motorway. This large wildlife preserve is home to a wide variety of wild flowers, birds and butterflies. Some cattle also graze on the site. It is owned and managed by the Friends of the Bog Meadows and the Ulster Wildlife Trust.

== Transport ==
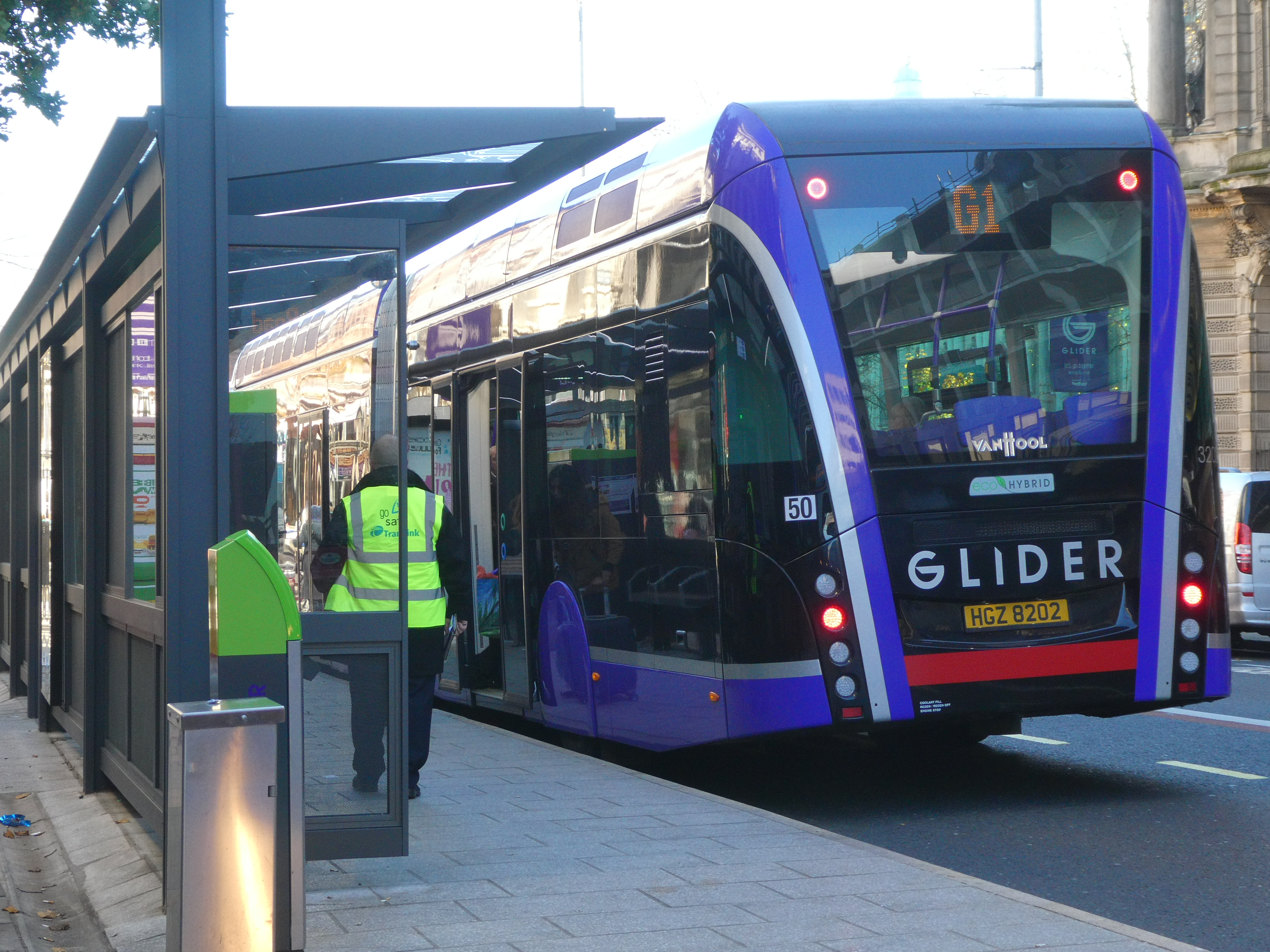
GliderBus-Belfast

Originally, there was a tram service providing public transport on the Falls Road. This was introduced in the late 19th century and replaced by trolleybuses in 1938. There were three routes along the road: 11 for Falls Road-Whiterock Road, 12 for Falls Road-Andersonstown Road and 13 for Falls Road-Glen Road. The 77 route, from the Gasworks to the Waterworks ran via Albert Street/Northumberland Street and cut across the Falls Road and the Shankill Road. The trolleybuses were replaced by diesel buses in the 1960s. With the outbreak of the Troubles, the bus service was withdrawn. The gap in public transport was replaced by black taxis. Since the Troubles ended, the public bus service has been re-introduced and expanded. Metro, a division of Translink, now operates the bus service. The Falls Road is designated one of the quality bus corridors (QBCs) within the city, with a variety of different routes.

In 2018, the Glider bus service was introduced. It provides a service from Poleglass via the Falls Road-City Centre and Newtownards Road to Dundonald. It was the first cross-city bus service.

=== Street names ===
Following a decision of Belfast City Council in 2021, many of the streets in the area now have bilingual (English-Irish) signs. Guidance on the wording of these signs is taken from the Northern Ireland Place Names Project. Examples are "Ardmoulin Street-Sráid Ard an Mhuilinn" and "Beechmount Avenue-Ascaill Ard na bhFeá".

== Politics ==
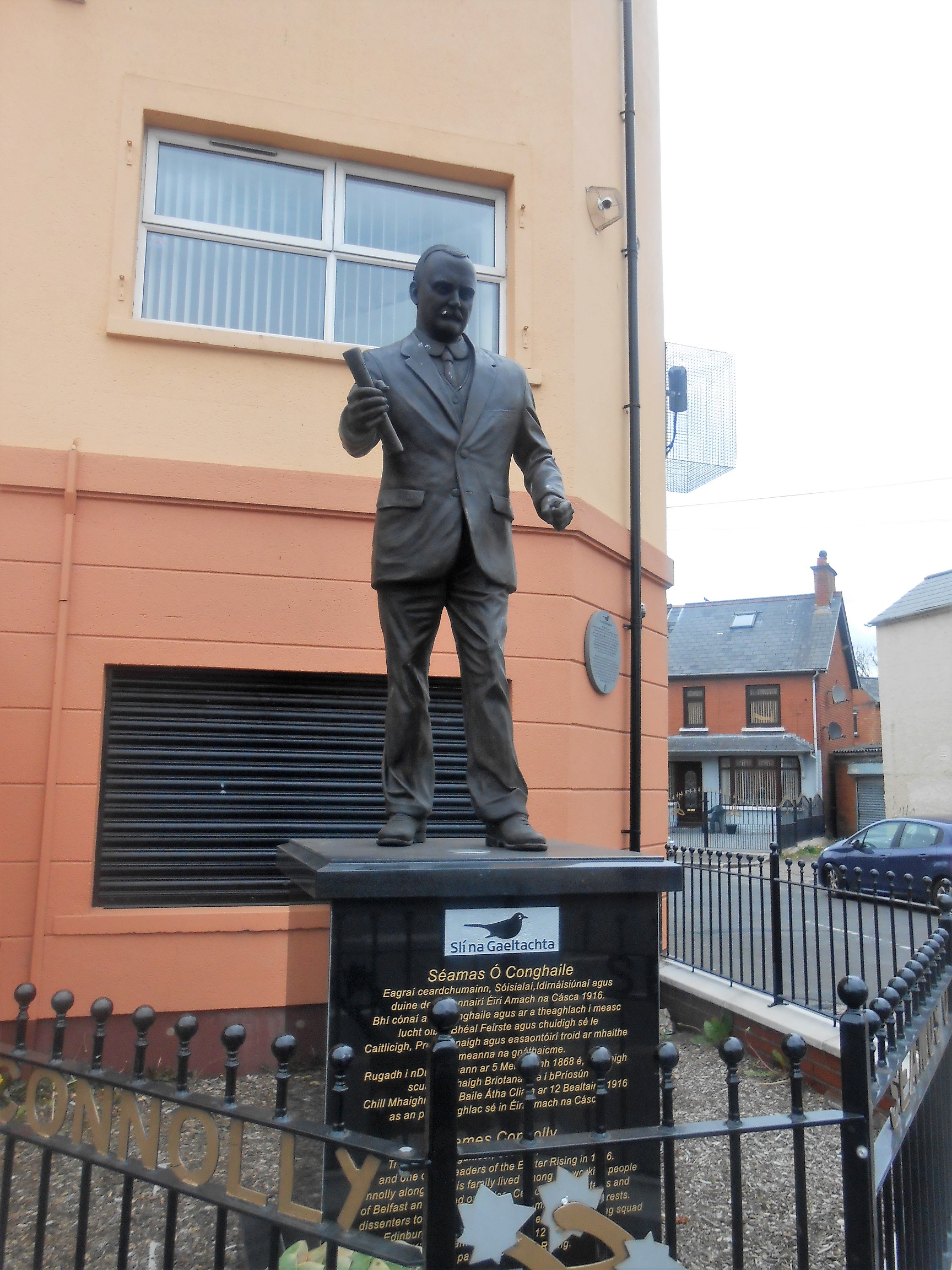
James Connolly statue, Belfast

A predominantly working-class community, the area has seen an ongoing contest between various versions of labour/socialist and nationalist/Irish republican ideas for electoral leadership. Between 1911 and 1913, James Connolly, the socialist republican, resided in the Upper Falls area as Belfast as organiser for both the Irish Transport and General Workers' Union, drawing women millworkers into the affiliated Irish Textile Workers Union (ITWU), and the Irish Socialist Party. This was at that time when the Falls was generally seen as "the political preserve of Joseph Devlin", the Belfast West, Irish Parliamentary Party, MP, and leader of the Ancient Order of Hibernians. Connolly described Devlin and his supporters as bringing "every species of intimidation and bribery . . . to bear upon Catholics who refused to bow to the dictates of the official Home Rule gang".

In 1913, Connolly stood for Belfast Corporation but lost with a vote of 905 against 1523. Winifred Carney, who had been raised on the Falls and was his secretary in the ITWU, was by Connolly's side in the GPO during the 1916 Easter Rising. Later, in the 1930s, she was to be involved with her husband, George McBride, in socialist and republican politics on the Protestant and unionist Shankill Road. She is buried in Milltown Cemetery and, in 2024, a statue of her was unveiled on the grounds of Belfast City Hall.

The Falls Road forms the centre of the Belfast West constituency, although it also includes areas from the neighbouring unionist Shankill Road district. In the general election of 1906, Devlin regained the constituency for the IPP, defeating the Unionists by just 16 votes. In the 1918 general election, a separate Belfast Falls constituency was created, which was again won by Joe Devlin, who heavily defeated Éamon de Valera, who was standing for Sinn Féin. After partition, the constituency of Belfast West was reconstituted for the 1922 United Kingdom general election and was won by the Ulster Unionist Party who held it for 11 years until it was won by Jack Beattie, standing for Labour, who held it from 1943 to 1950 and again from 1951 to 1955. It was then held again by the Ulster Unionists until 1966.

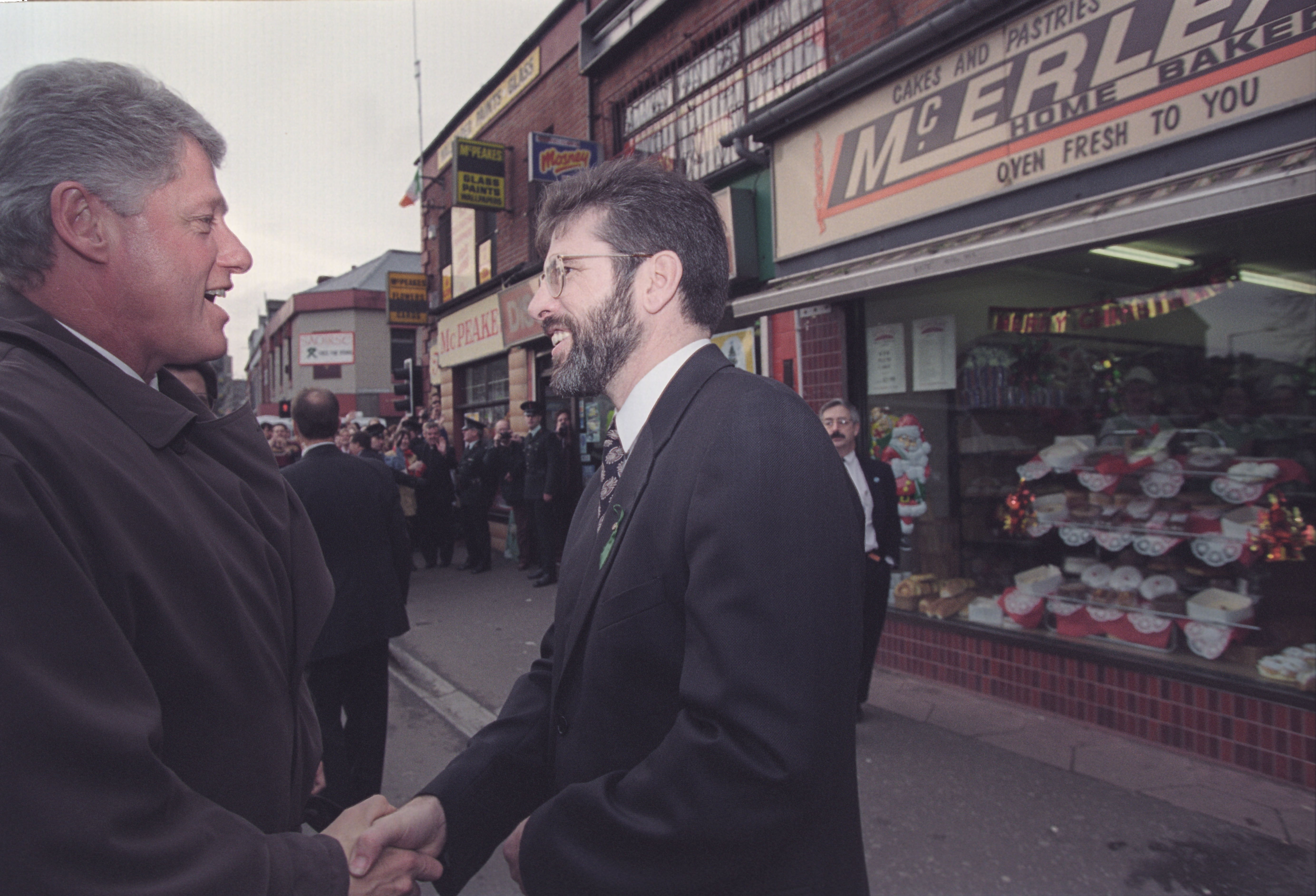
President Bill Clinton shaking hands with Gerry Adams

In the 1964 United Kingdom general election, Billy McMillen stood as a Republican Clubs candidate for the Belfast West. His office was in Divis Street and the Irish tricolour, alongside the Starry Plough of Connolly's Irish Citizen Army, was displayed in the window. The Flags and Emblems Act gave the RUC the power to remove any flag or emblem from public or private property which was considered to be likely to cause a breach of the peace. This was generally interpreted as any Irish flag, since the Union Jack was specifically excluded from the Act. Ian Paisley insisted the RUC remove the Irish tricolour or he would organise a march and remove it himself. The police, fearing a backlash from Loyalists, removed it, causing unrest and rioting by local residents. James Kilfedder, standing for the Ulster Unionist Party, was elected to the seat that year but was defeated two years later in 1966 by Gerry Fitt, who held the seat for the Republican Labour Party and then the SDLP for seventeen years until 1983, when Gerry Adams won the seat for Sinn Féin. He held the seat for over twenty years (1983–1992 and 1997–2011), with Joe Hendron of the SDLP holding it for the intervening five years (1992–1997). Paul Maskey of Sinn Féin was elected MP in 2011 and has held the seat since but, in line with Sinn Féin's abstentionist policy, he has not actually taken the seat at Westminster. In 1995, President Bill Clinton visited the area, where he shook hands with Gerry Adams near the corner with the Springfield Road.

In the 1929 Northern Ireland general election, the Belfast Falls constituency was won by the Nationalist Richard Byrne after a bitter contest with William McMullen, a supporter of Connolly. In the 1945 election, Harry Diamond won the seat, standing for the Socialist Republican Party. He held the seat until 1969, when he was defeated by Paddy Devlin, standing for the Northern Ireland Labour Party. Devlin, who had once been a member, alongside Diamond, of the Belfast branch of the Irish Labour Party, became a founding member of the Social Democratic and Labour Party in 1970 and remained a member until Parliament was prorogued in 1972.

It was replaced by the power-sharing Northern Ireland Assembly in 1973, which only met for one year. After the Good Friday Agreement in 1998, a new Northern Ireland Assembly was established.

In the 2022 Northern Ireland Assembly election, a total of four Sinn Féin and one People Before Profit representatives were elected in the Belfast West constituency.

In elections for Belfast City Council, three of the seven wards (Falls Park, Ballymurphy, and Beechmount) within the Black Mountain Electoral Area cover the Middle and Upper Falls area, while two of the six wards (Clonard and Falls) within the Court Electoral Area cover the Lower Falls area. In the 2023 district election, six Sinn Féin and one SDLP councillors were elected for the Black Mountain Electoral Area, while two Sinn Féin, three DUP and one TUV councillor was elected for the Court Electoral Area.

== The Troubles ==
In the late 1960s, many Catholics from across Northern Ireland began to campaign, many with Northern Ireland Civil Rights Association (NICRA), against discrimination in housing and jobs, under the banner of a civil rights campaign, in conscious imitation of the philosophy of, and tactics used by, the American Civil Rights Movement. Northern Ireland was part of the UK, but the voting criteria were different to those of England, Scotland and Wales, where a person could vote as soon as they became 18 years old. In Northern Ireland, an 18-year-old could only vote if they were the named owner or named renter of a house. Most of the Catholic houses had three generations living in the same dwelling, because of housing discrimination, so only the mother and father could vote. Furthermore, business owners, depending on the size of the company, were entitled to three to six votes, unlike anywhere else in the United Kingdom.

Many Unionists saw NICRA as an Irish republican Trojan horse, designed to destabilise Northern Ireland and force unionists into a united Ireland. Several streets around the Falls Road were burnt out by armed 'B' Specials (Police Reserve) and loyalists in August 1969, with the murder of six Catholics on the first night marking the start of 'The Troubles. In response to the worsening situation, the British Government deployed the British Army on the Falls Road to protect the Catholics from further attacks. The troops were initially welcomed by the Falls residents as protectors, but heavy-handed tactics by the mostly British-born members of the Army who did not know, care about or understand the situation would estrange most Catholics and nationalists.

From 3–5 July 1970, the road was the scene of what became known as the Falls Curfew. 3,000 British troops carried out an operation to search the area for hidden weapon caches, sealing off the streets around the Falls Road. Local youths attacked the troops, who responded by firing 1,600 canisters of CS gas to disperse the crowds. The operation was also opposed by the Official IRA (OIRA), with OIRA gunmen engaging British troops in multiple gun battles across the area. Over the course of the operation, four Catholic civilians were killed by the Army, which recovered ninety rifles. The operation was widely regarded as the end of the British Army's "honeymoon" period with the nationalist community in Belfast.

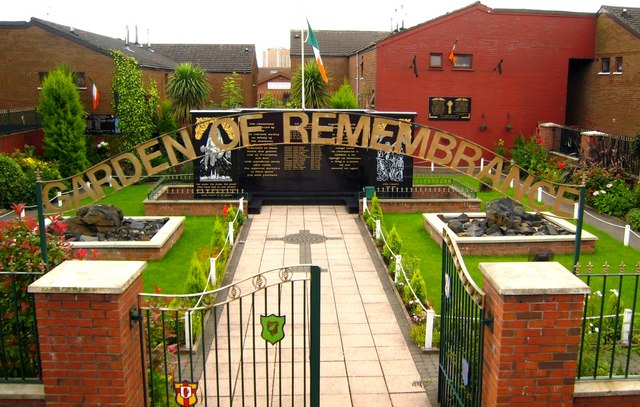
Garden of Remembrance, Falls Road.

During the Troubles, there were repeated sectarian attacks by loyalists on residents of the Falls Road. These attacks increased during the 1969 Northern Ireland riots, when whole streets in the Falls Road area were destroyed by loyalists from the Shankill Road area. Loyalist paramilitaries killed many local residents. Temporary barricades were constructed to provide residents with some security. These developed into peace walls, which today separate the Falls Road from the neighbouring Shankill Road. Although the Troubles have now ceased, the peace walls still exist in this so-called interface area.

For the next three decades, the British Army maintained a substantial presence on the Falls Road, occupying a base on top of the Divis Tower. This was removed in August 2005 as part of the British government's normalisation programme, following the Provisional Irish Republican Army's statement that it was ending its armed activities. In the intervening period, the Falls Road area saw some of the worst violence of the Troubles. The last British soldier to be killed on the road itself was Private Nicholas Peacock, killed by a booby trap bomb left outside the Rock Bar, opposite the top of the Donegall Road on 1 February 1989.

In 1991, IRA hit squads based in the Upper Falls and Beechmount were involved in attacks against loyalist paramilitaries in the nearby Village area. In September 1991, they shot 19-year-old UVF member John Hanna at his home on the Donegall Road and, in November of the same year, they shot William Kingsberry and his stepson, Samuel Mehaffey, members of the UDA and RHC respectively, in their home on Lecale Street. The Good Friday Agreement was signed in 1998, followed by decommissioning of weapons by the IRA and the formal ending of its campaign in 2005.

== Literary and musical references ==
There are many literary references to life on the Falls Road. These include:

- Gerry Adams (1982). Falls Memories. Dingle:Brandon.
- Ciaran Carson (1997). Star Factory. London: Granta Books.
- Liam Carson (2010). Call Mother a Lonely Field. Bridgend: Seren.
- Eimer O'Callaghan (2014). Belfast Days. A 1972 Teenage Diary. Sallins: Merrion Press.
- Patricia Craig (2007). Asking for Trouble. Belfast: Blackstaff.

The American singer Nanci Griffith sings in her song "It's a hard life wherever you go", which she wrote after visiting Belfast:

I am a backseat driver from America
They drive to the left on Falls Road
The man at the wheel's name is Seamus
We pass a child on the corner he knows
And Seamus says, "Now, what chance has that kid got?"
And I say from the back, "I don't know."
He says, "There's barbed wire at all of these exits
And there ain't no place in Belfast for that kid to go."

Gary Kemp, British songwriter and singer for British soft rock group Spandau Ballet attributes his writing of the band's 1986 hit "Through the Barricades" to emotion he experienced while on Falls Road.

== See also ==
- Gaeltacht Quarter, Belfast
- Lower Falls (District Electoral Area)
- Upper Falls (District Electoral Area)
- Raidió Fáilte
