= Shaw's Road =

Coordinates: 54.577°N 6.005°W

Shaw's Road: Bóthar Seoighe
- Location within Northern Ireland
- Population: 200 (approx)
  - Belfast: 3 mi (4.8 km)
- County: County Antrim
- Country: Northern Ireland
- Sovereign state: United Kingdom
- Postcode district: BT11, BT12
- Dialling code: 028
- Police: Northern Ireland
- Fire: Northern Ireland
- Ambulance: Northern Ireland
- UK Parliament: Belfast West
- NI Assembly: Belfast West

Shaw's Road is a road in west Belfast, Northern Ireland, connecting the Andersonstown Road with the Glen Road.

== Shaw's Road Gaeltacht ==
Located on the road, is a small Gaeltacht (Irish-speaking area) known colloquially as "The Irish Houses", and in Irish as Bóthar Seoighe (meaning "Shaw's Road") and Pobal Feirste (meaning "Farset Community"). This community was established in 1969 when five families from Belfast built their houses together in a new development on the road. One of the early residents was Aodán Mac Póilin. The community expanded through the years and now there are 22 houses in the Gaeltacht.

In 1971, parents in the Gaeltacht established the first Irish-medium school in Northern Ireland. After much turbulence during that time, and a lengthy campaign, the school received official recognition from the Department of Education in 1985. The school has since grown rapidly and is no longer under direct administration by the Gaeltacht, but remains Irish-medium and over 350 students attend.

The Shaw's Road Gaeltacht has a strong culture of traditional music, dance and drama and the Irish language continues to be the normal language of communication between residents.

The Shaws Road Gaeltacht is considered the inspiration for Irish speakers throughout Ulster. This is the argument of a BBC Gaeilge two-part documentary “The Irish Houses – Scéal Phobal Bhóthar Seoighe” (the story of the Shaw’s Road community).

There is often some confusion between the Shaw's Road Gaeltacht and the Gaeltacht Quarter in west Belfast, which is a related, but newer and distinct project located in the centre of the Falls Road district. The Shaw's Road Gaeltacht is located closer to Andersonstown.
