= Garden of Remembrance (Belfast) =

Memorial garden in Belfast

Coordinates: 53.353979°N 6.263693°W

The Garden of Remembrance (Irish: An Gairdín Cuimhneacháin) is a memorial garden in Belfast, Northern Ireland, dedicated to the Irish Republican Army members killed during The Troubles, as well as civilians and deceased ex-prisoners. It is located on the Falls Road, which has historically been a predominantly Irish Republican area during the conflict.

== Design ==
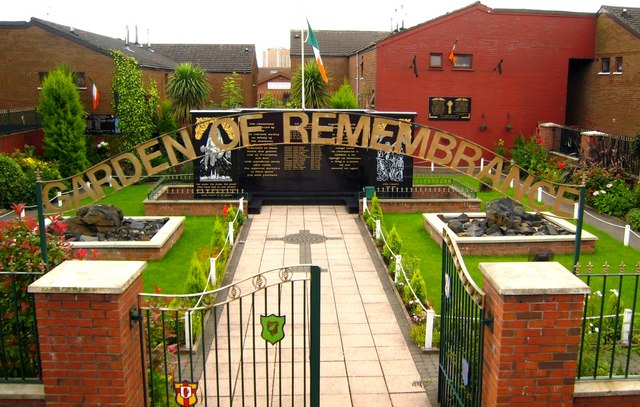

The garden features an iron gate, with a patio leading towards a large plaque. There are gardens on either side of the walkway. An Irish Tricolour flies over the plaque. As of 2024 a Palestinian Flag is flying alongside the Irish Flag.

== Commemoration ==
The Garden commemorates the D' Company 2nd Battalion Belfast Brigade of the Provisional Irish Republican Army, and bears a message in both Irish and English:

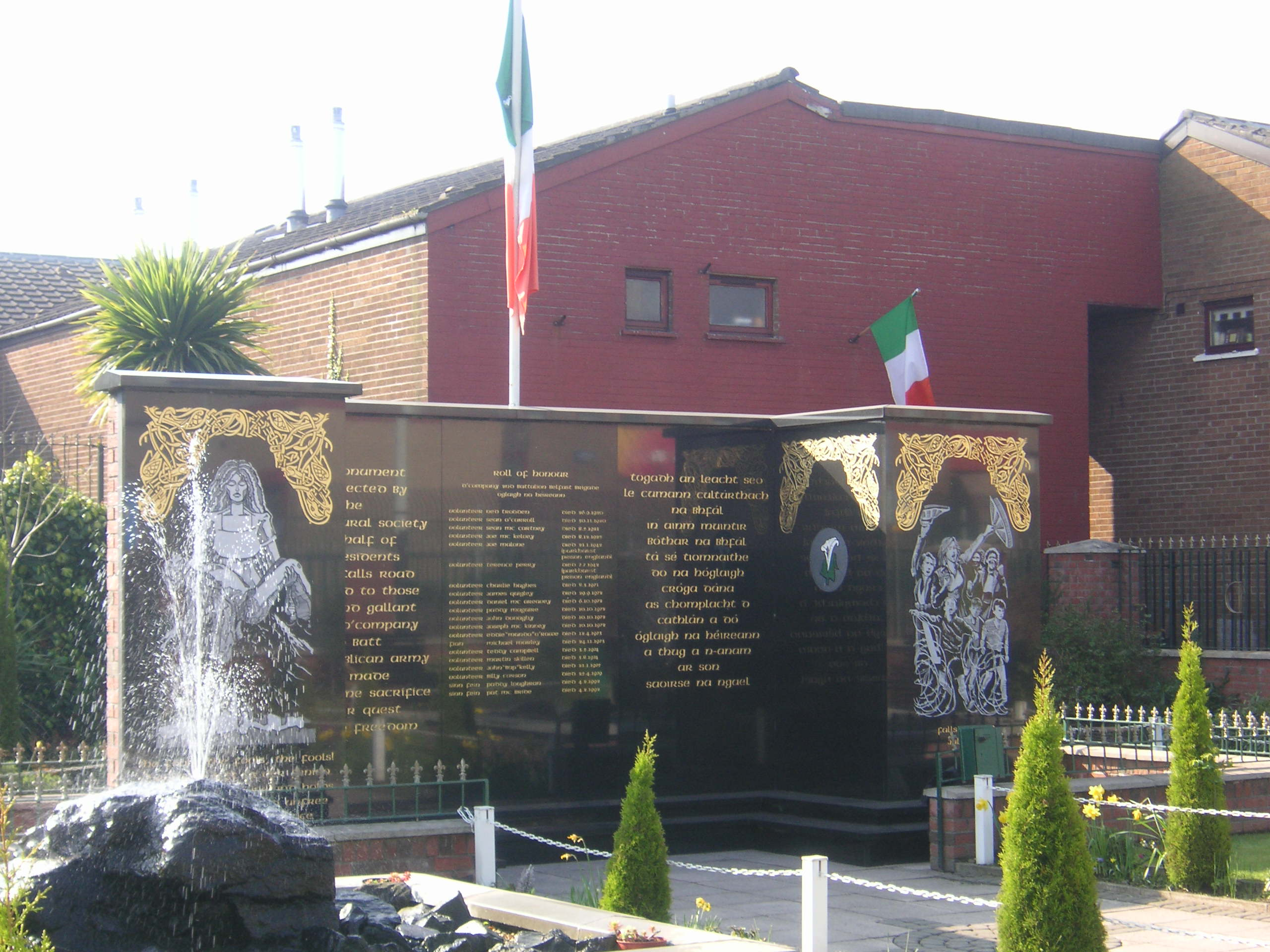
Garden of Remembrance

'This monument was erected by the Falls Cultural Society on behalf of the Residents of the Falls Road dedicated to those brave and gallant vols of D' Company 2nd Batt Irish Republican Army who made the supreme sacrifice in their quest for Irish Freedom'

== See also ==
- Provisional IRA Belfast Brigade
