= Irish Republican History Museum =

Museum in Belfast, Northern Ireland

Coordinates: 54.599°N 5.951°W

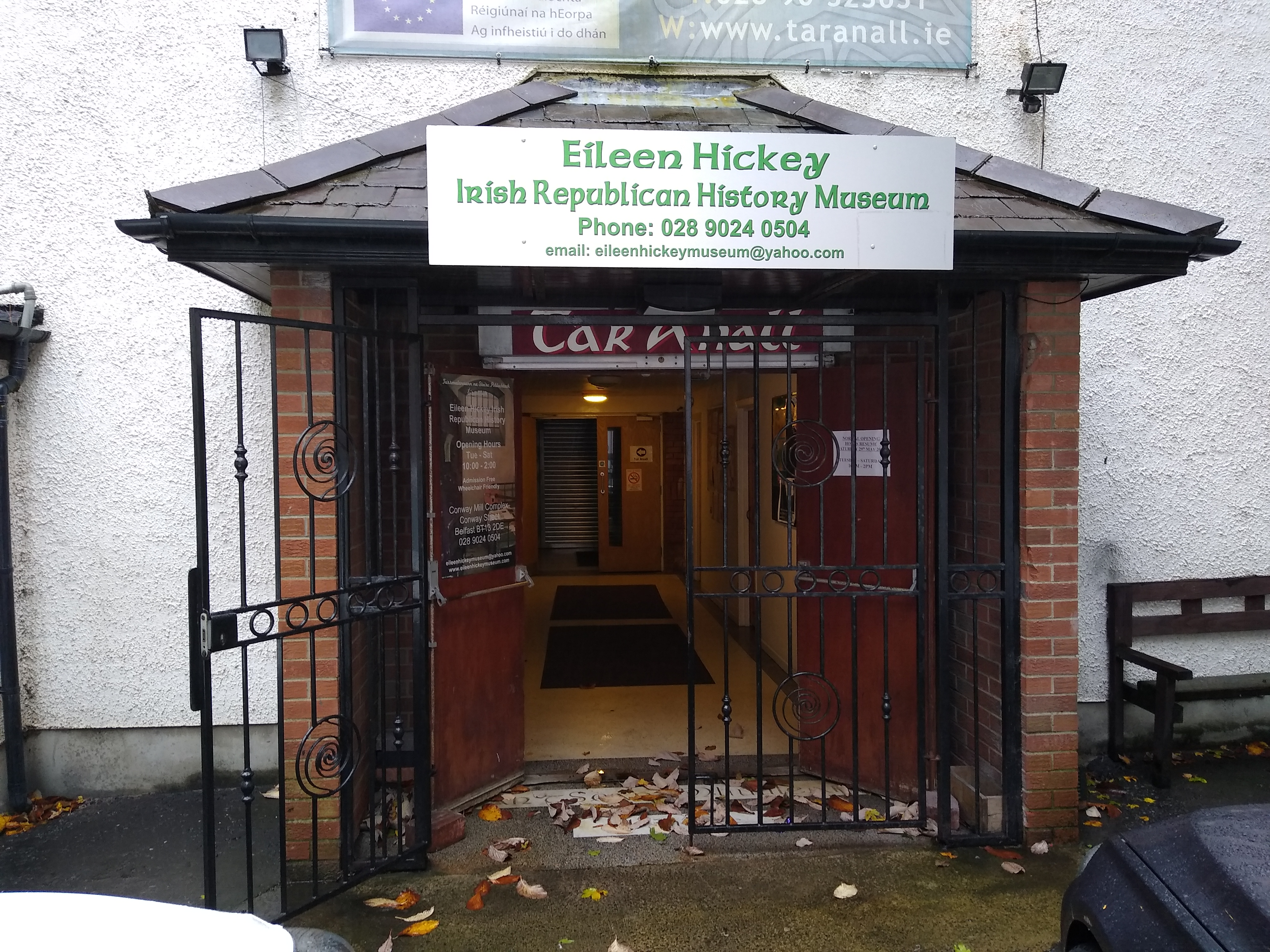
Entrance

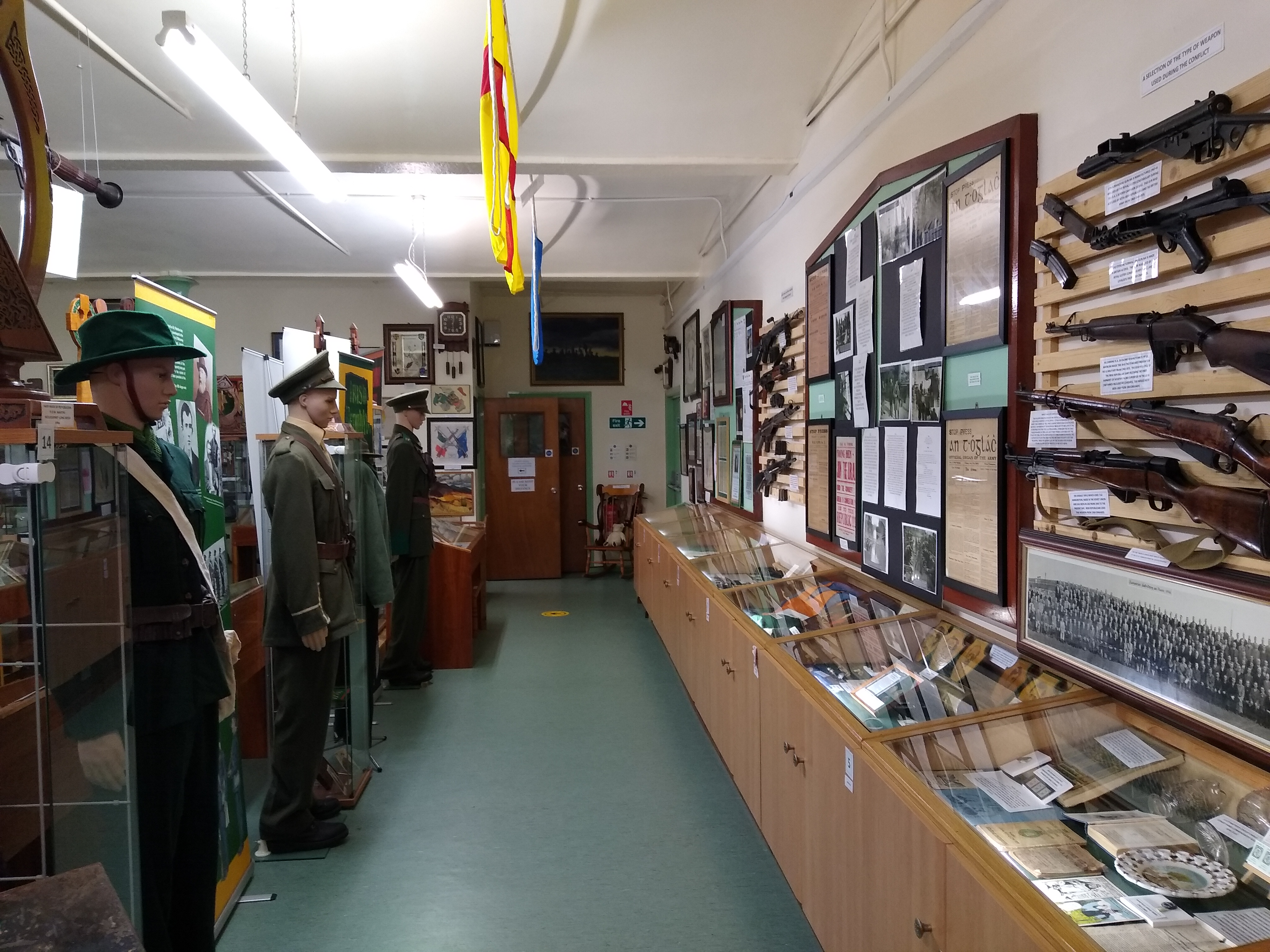
Interior

The Eileen Hickey Irish Republican History Museum (Irish: Iarsmalann na Staire Poblachtach Éireannach), is a museum in Belfast, Northern Ireland. It was established in 2007 after years of campaigning by Eileen Hickey, who collected the exhibits.

The museum is based in Conway Mill in the Falls Road area of West Belfast. The site is a former linen mill built in 1842 which has been in community use for the last thirty years. The museum opened in February 2007 on the first anniversary of the death of Eileen Hickey, one of the major driving forces behind the initiative. The museum is administrated by a committee made up of volunteers.

Hickey was the former Officer Commanding of the Provisional Irish Republican Army (IRA) prisoners in Armagh Women's prison and she dedicated her life to preserving artifacts and relics from the period in Irish history known as The Troubles.

The museum was officially opened by Fr. Des Wilson and Noelle Ryan.

Exhibits have been donated by hundreds of individuals and families. These include prisoners handicrafts made by republicans imprisoned around the world, weapons used by republicans and pictures and artwork relating to the conflict.

Some exhibits date back as far as the United Irishmen's rebellion of 1798.

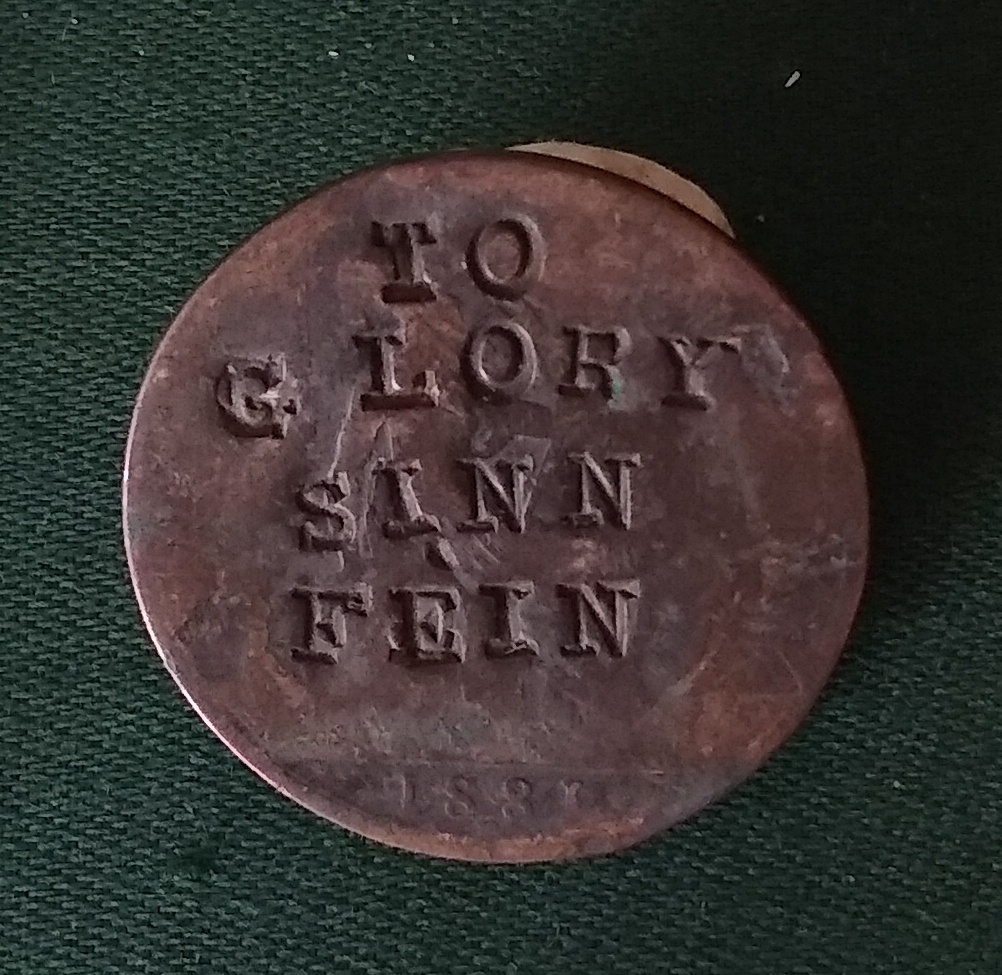
An 1881 penny stamped "TO GLORY SINN FEIN" on display at the museum

Key exhibits include:

- A jacket worn by IRA volunteer Mairéad Farrell while in prison.
- A cell door and bed removed from Armagh women's prison.
- A large array of posters and paintings related to the conflict.
- Articles of interest on deceased members of the National Graves Association, Belfast and other republicans in Belfast and beyond.
- A library and interpretive centre to help with education projects and those conducting historical research.
