= Miriam Daly =

Irish republican and communist activist (1928 - 1980)

- Daly, c. 1970s
- Born: Miriam Annette McDonnell; May 6, 1928; The Curragh, County Kildare, Ireland
- Died: June 26, 1980 (aged 52); Andersonstown, Belfast, Northern Ireland
- Resting place: Swords, County Dublin, Ireland
- Other name: Miriam Lee (1953 to 1963)
- Education: Loreto College, St Stephen's Green; University College Dublin (BA, HDipE, MA)
- Occupation: Senior lecturer at Queen's University Belfast
- Known for: Political and Civil Rights activism
- Political party: Irish Republican Socialist Party (1977 until her death in 1980)
- Other political affiliations: Fine Gael (c. 1950s); National Democratic Party (1969); Social Democratic and Labour Party (1970 to 1974); Sinn Féin (1974 to 1977)
- Spouse: Jim Daly
- Children: 2

Miriam Daly (née McDonnell; 6 May 1928 – 26 June 1980) was an Irish republican and communist activist as well as a university lecturer who was assassinated by the loyalist Ulster Defence Association (UDA) in 1980.

== Background and personal life ==
She was born Miriam Annette McDonnell in the Curragh Irish Army camp, County Kildare, Ireland, one of the two daughters of Commandant Daniel McDonnell and Anne McDonnell (née Cummins). Her father had served under Michael Collins in the War of Independence and as part of the pro-treaty National Army during the Irish Civil War. Afterwards, he developed pro-Labour views.

She grew up in Hatch Street, Dublin, where she attended Loreto College on St Stephen's Green and then University College, Dublin. While at UCD, Daly was a member of Young Fine Gael. She graduated with a Bachelor of Arts degree in 1948 with first-class honours in history and economics, a Higher Diploma in Education in 1949, and then a first-class honours Master of Arts, with a dissertation on Irish labour in England in the first half of the nineteenth century. Between 1950 and 1953 she taught economic history as an assistant lecturer in University College Dublin alongside Robert Dudley Edwards, who sexually harassed her until one day her father arrived with a gun and confronted Edwards.

In 1953 she married the psychiatrist Joseph Lee and together the two moved to England, where she was an extramural history lecturer. She became an active member of the Association of University Teachers and a campaigner against the Vietnam War. Lee died of a heart attack in 1963. A year later she began teaching economic history at the University of Southampton.

In 1965 she married philosopher and social activist James Daly, who had family from Ulster. They moved to Ireland in 1968 and were appointed lecturers in the departments of scholastic philosophy and of economic and social history at Queen's University, Belfast. In 1970 they adopted twins.

== Civil rights activist ==
Apart from her set course, Daly taught an extramural course on labour history whose students included numerous Protestant trade unionists. She also lectured both republican and loyalist prisoners in Long Kesh and cooperated with both on prisoner welfare work. She contributed regularly to RTÉ Radio's Thomas Davis lectures in 1972–3. She was a founding member of the Irish Labour History Society, served on its committee for several years and co-edited its journal Saothar. She was a co-founder of the Economic and Social History Society of Ireland, a committee member of the Ulster Society for Irish Historical Studies, a member of the editorial board of Irish Historical Studies, and organised the first conference on Irish labour history held at an Irish university in 1974.

Daly became active in the Northern Ireland civil rights movement following the introduction of internment without trial of suspected IRA members in 1972 by Westminster officials at the request of Prime Minister of Northern Ireland Brian Faulkner. She was active in the Northern Ireland Civil Rights Association (NICRA), and the Northern Resistance Movement (NRA), becoming involved in the former when she moved to Belfast; Daly subsequently joined the National Democratic Party (NDP), and its successor, the Social Democratic and Labour Party (SDLP). As a member of the SDLP she butted heads with John Hume and opposed advocacy for increased private home ownership rather than extended state housing. At the first SDLP annual conference, Daly led opposition to a motion condemning all political violence that was proposed by Hume.

The rapid escalation of violence in Northern Ireland during this period, in particular, the killing of 14 civil rights marchers by members of 1 PARA in Derry on 30 January 1972 in what later became known as "Bloody Sunday" further radicalised her. After Bloody Sunday, she left the SDLP and joined Sinn Féin in 1974.

During her political career, Daly, in line with many Irish republicans, opposed the two nations theory which held that Ulster Protestants constituted a distinct Irish nation. She also joined the Prisoners' Relatives Action Committee (PRAC), the National Hunger Strike Committee (NHSC) and the Murray Defence Committee (MDC), the latter of which successfully prevented the anarchist couple Marie and Noel Murray from being executed after they were convicted of murder and sentenced to death in June 1976 for murdering Garda Síochána officer Michael Reynolds. During the campaign to prevent the Murrays from being executed, Daly worked with Seamus Costello. She was also elected to the leadership of the National H-Blocks Committee, despite threats from loyalists.

In 1977, Daly and her partner left Sinn Féin over the party's advocacy of an Irish federation of four self-governing provinces. They were recruited in August 1977 to the IRSP by Costello, and co-opted to its Árd Chomhairle or governing body just before Costello's assassination on 5 October 1977, allegedly by the Official IRA. In February 1978 Miriam Daly was elected chairperson of the IRSP. Some later IRSP/INLA material describes Daly as a 'volunteer', but she was never a member of the Irish National Liberation Army, the IRSP's military wing.

In 1974 the Dalys, who had received death threats, moved from their home in Stranmillis, close to Queen's University and working-class Protestant loyalist districts, to the Andersonstown Road, deep within the west Belfast Catholic ghetto.

From 1978 onwards Daly campaigned for political status for paramilitary prisoners.

In March 1979, Daly resigned as chairperson following a dispute between the Árd Comhairle and the Coiste Seasta (officer board). She was later replaced by then-General Secretary, Mick Plunkett.

On 15 June 1980, 11 days before her killing, Daly was elected to the new Armagh and H-Blocks national committee.

== Assassination ==
Mural in Belfast, 2025

On 26 June 1980, Daly was shot dead at home, in the Andersonstown area of west Belfast. At the time of her assassination, she was involved in IRSP/INLA prisoners' welfare.

According to reports in The Irish Times, members of the Ulster Defence Association (UDA) had gained entry to her home with the intention of killing her husband. They tied up Daly and waited for him to return home. Her husband was in Dublin at the time and so did not arrive. After a considerable time, the UDA men decided to kill Daly instead. Muffling the sound of the gun with a pillow, they shot her in the head and cut the phone lines before fleeing. Her body was discovered when her ten-year-old daughter arrived home from school. However, The Irish Times also referred to Daly as a "housewife".

Daly's death occurred soon after Conservative Party politician and incumbent Shadow Secretary of State for Northern Ireland Airey Neave was assassinated in Westminster Palace, London by members of the INLA, and some have speculated that the UDA's killing of Daly (along with the murder and attempted murder of other Irish Republican Socialist Party (ISRP) and National H-Block Committee members such as Ronnie Bunting, John Turnley and Bernadette Devlin McAliskey during this period) was in retaliation for Neave's murder. Solicitor Michael Brentnall claimed in an interview that "There are compelling circumstances which indicate that the killings were either committed by the British security services or facilitated by them and these killings are connected in proximity and organisational terms to the killing of Airey Neave."

During the 1982 trial of three UDA members for the death of John Turnley, one of the accused, Robert McConnell, stood up in court towards the end and read out a statement detailing how two members of the Special Air Service (SAS) had supplied him with weapons and other equipment and had discussed with him the activities of H-Block activists such as Miriam Daly, John Turnley and Bernadette Devlin McAliskey.

'Operation Ranc' was a series of planned actions by British Intelligence against the INLA following the assassination of Airey Neave. The 'G' (Guards) squadron of the 22 SAS Regiment were actively involved in Operation Ranc. It is believed by Fr. Raymond Murray that Daly, Bunting, Lyttle and Turnley were killed as part of the operation. The operation was prematurely terminated following protests from the Irish government.

Daly was buried in Swords, County Dublin with her first husband, after a paramilitary funeral. Mourners included Seán Mac Stíofáin and Ruairí Ó Brádaigh, but also old friends such as Supreme Court of Ireland (and later European Court of Justice) judge Donal Barrington and UCD historian F.X. Martin. In the graveside oration, Osgur Breatnach said that Daly stood for a peaceful, socialist united Ireland. She is included as a volunteer on the INLA monument in Milltown Cemetery and is one of several commemorated by an IRSP mural on the Springfield Road, Belfast.

In 2021 her commemoration held by the IRSP in Belfast was attended by her son and husband at the time of her death.

== Political views ==
Daly was an advocate of State Socialism based on the nation-state, with government control of credit and industry. She rejected capitalism and free trade on the basis of her belief that free trade was overwhelmingly biased in the favour of the already-developed countries. Daly developed this view from her academic research into 19th-century Ireland and in particular her analysis of the deindustrialising effect of improved transport links.

Daly considered the 1916 Easter Rising and the 1917 Russian Revolution to be twin revolutions against the "capitalist world order", and generally held pro-Soviet views.

Daly rejected the view that Ulster Protestants form a distinct "nation" within the geography of Ireland, dismissing them as "a product of British colonial manipulation and native collaboration".
