= Fergus O'Hare =

Activist from Northern Ireland

Member of Belfast City Council
- In office 20 May 1981 – 15 May 1985
- Preceded by: Seamus Lynch
- Succeeded by: District abolished
- Constituency: Belfast Area G

Personal details
- Party: People's Democracy

Fergus O'Hare (Irish: Fergus Ó hÍr) is an Irish musician, activist and former republican politician, active in Northern Ireland.

O'Hare was involved in the civil rights movement in Northern Ireland as a member of People's Democracy in the late 1960s and early 1970s. Later he became a founding member and executive member of the Northern Resistance Movement, which continued to campaign for civil rights in Northern Ireland.

== Biography ==
With the introduction of internment without trial in 1971, O'Hare helped set up and became chairperson of the Political Hostages Release Committee: a group which organised a mass campaign against internment throughout the early 1970s. When internment was phased out in the mid-1970s, and with the decision of the British Government to end special category status for prisoners, O'Hare became involved with the campaign to "defend political status" for the prisoners. He became a member of the Relative's Action Committee and of the National H-Block Armagh Committee which helped organise the struggle in support of the hunger strikers in the early 1980s.

In 1981 he was elected as member of Belfast City Council, defeating Gerry Fitt who was a Westminster MP as well as a Belfast councillor.

The election of O'Hare, and of other candidates who stood in support of the H-Block prisoners during this period, occurred within the context of an ongoing debate within the H-Block movement and within Sinn Féin with regard to the use of elections as a tactic for building support for the prisoners' campaign, and for the campaign for social and democratic rights in Ireland. Sinn Féin at this time had a policy of boycotting elections. On the National H Block Armagh Committee, O'Hare and others such as Bernadette Devlin McAliskey argued that participation in elections should be used as a tactic in the campaign. During this debate, McAliskey, supported by People's Democracy and others, stood as a candidate in the Northern Ireland constituency in support of the prisoners, in the election for the European Parliament in 1979, winning more than 30,000 votes. When Frank Maguire, a Westminster MP, died in 1981, People's Democracy and Bernadette Devlin McAliskey argued that a candidate should stand in the by-election to demonstrate the high level of support that existed for the prisoners. The outcome of this debate was that hunger-striker Bobby Sands was put forward as a candidate and elected to the Westminster parliament. After Sands' death, his election agent Owen Carron of Sinn Féin won the seat.

The substantial vote for Bernadette McAliskey in the 1979 European elections, the success of pro-H-Block candidates in the 1981 Council Elections, especially Fergus O'Hare "unceremoniously dumping Gerry Fitt from the seat he had occupied for twenty three years", the Westminster election victories of Bobby Sands and Owen Carron and the election of hunger-striker Kieran Doherty and republican prisoner Paddy Agnew in the Irish general election in June 1981, demonstrated the high level of support for the H-block prisoners, despite the assertions to the contrary by the British Government and others. These election results also helped resolve the debate within Sinn Féin in favour of using elections as part of the republican struggle. Later, in June 1983 Gerry Adams of Sinn Féin won a Westminster seat from Gerry Fitt and Sinn Féin went on to continued electoral success becoming the largest nationalist party elected to the 2007 Northern Ireland Assembly.

Ironically, those who led the argument that elections should be used to further the republican project in Ireland were subsequently sidelined electorally by a resurgent Sinn Féin, so that in the Assembly elections in 1982, O'Hare and the other People's Democracy candidates fared badly, their vote largely going to Sinn Féin candidates for Belfast West Belfast North.

In the 1990s, O'Hare became involved in the Irish language movement and in 1991 he helped set up and became the first head teacher of Meánscoil Feirste (later known as Coláiste Feirste): the first Irish language secondary school in northern Ireland). He served as a member of Comhairle na Gaelscolaíochta and Iontaobhas na Gaelscolaíochta; organisations set up after the Good Friday Agreement to help promote Irish language schools in Northern Ireland.

Later, he was involved with the establishment of Raidió Fáilte: the first legal Irish language radio station in Northern Ireland, of which he became manager in 2006. The station continues to broadcast in Irish in the Belfast area and throughout the world online.

In the early 1980s, Fergus O'Hare wrote a column in Fortnight, a Belfast-based politics and arts review magazine and for An Gael the magazine of the New York Irish Arts Centre. He published a history of the 1907 Belfast dockers and carters strike led by James Larkin, 'The divine gospel of discontent'. In 2007 he published a book in Irish on Irish flora, Mórbhealaí & Cúlbhealaí.
