= Raidió Fáilte =

Irish-language radio station in Belfast

- Northern Ireland
- Broadcast area: Greater Belfast Area – Northern Ireland on FM
- Frequencies: 107.1 MHz FM; Digital terrestrial television DAB

Programming
- Format: Mixed network

Ownership
- Sister stations: Raidió na Life

History
- First air date: 15 September 2006

Links
- Website: www.raidiofailte.com

Raidió Fáilte (Irish pronunciation: [ˈɾˠadʲiːoː ˈfˠaːl̠ʲtʲə]; meaning "Welcome Radio") is an Irish-language community radio station, broadcasting from Belfast, Northern Ireland. It started broadcasting under its current licence on 15 September 2006 having operated as a pirate radio station for some time prior to that.

The station can be heard on 107.1 FM in the Belfast area, and online through a live stream on the station's website. It is broadcast 24 hours a day, seven days a week and was broadcast from the cultural centre Cultúrlann McAdam Ó Fiaich on the Falls Road for several years and subsequently from The Twin Spires Centre on Northumberland Street off the Falls Road, Belfast. In October 2018 the station moved to a state-of-the-art new building on the junction of the Falls Road and the Westlink motorway.

== History ==
Raidió Fáilte began airing on a part-time basis from Cultúrlann McAdam Ó Fiaich in the 1990s.

Raidió Fáilte was re-launched in Belfast City Hall on 15 September 2006 when Station Manager Fergus Ó hÍr introduced guest speakers Ferdia Mac an Fhailigh, Chief Executive of Foras na Gaeilge, and Bob Collins, Commissioner of the Equality Commission. A recorded message from the President of Ireland Mary McAleese welcoming the launch of Raidió Fáilte was played at the start of broadcasting.

== Programming ==
Programmes are aimed at the Irish-speaking community in Belfast. A mixture of traditional Irish music, indie, rock and world music and can be heard, together with current affairs and sports coverage and chat. Special programmes relating to Roman Catholic and Presbyterian church services through the medium of Irish have also been broadcast.

== See also ==
- Raidió na Life - Irish language community radio station in Dublin
- List of Irish-language media
- List of Celtic-language media
