= Eliza and Isabella Riddel =

Who endowed Riddel Hall to Queen's University Belfast in 1913

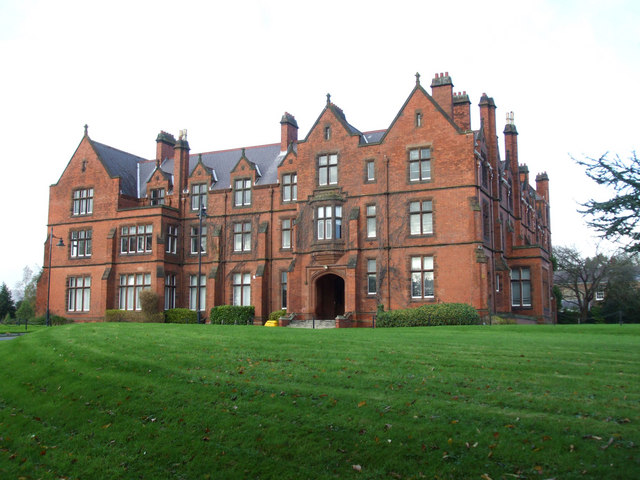
Riddel Hall, endowed in 1913 (opened 1915) by Eliza and Isabella Riddel as a residence for female students at Queen's University Belfast.

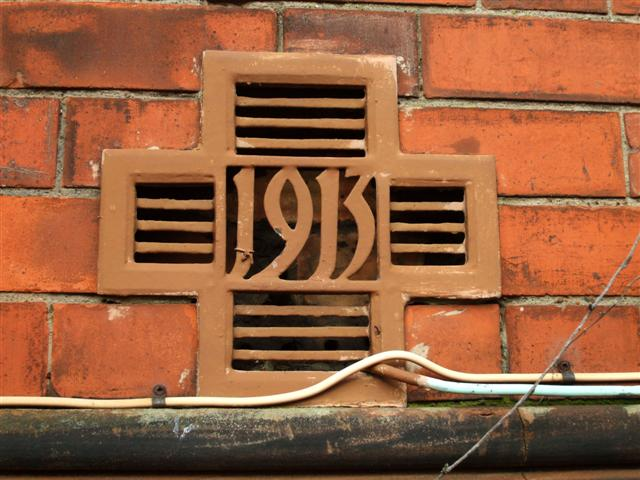
Vents at Riddel Hall celebrating the endowment of the building

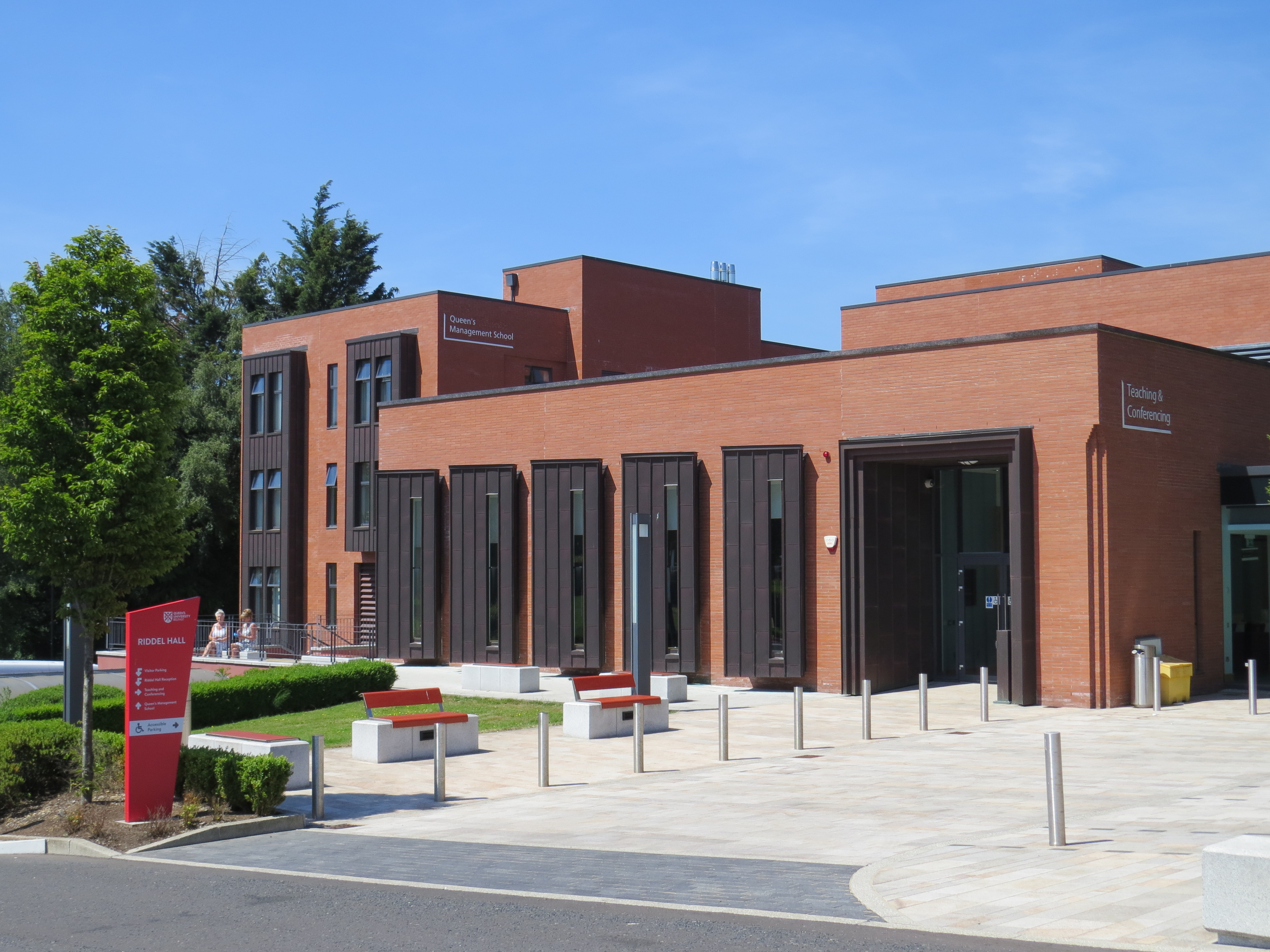
Extension of the site (2011) and relocation of Queen's Management School

Eliza (1831–1924) and Isabella Riddel (1836–1918) were sisters who are best known for Riddel Hall in Stranmillis, Belfast, Ireland, which they established in 1913 as a university hall of residence for women.

== Background ==
Eliza and Isabella were the youngest two members of the wealthy Riddel family of ten children. The family made its money in the hardware business, established in 1803 by their father John Riddel (1783–1870). On the death of Samuel Riddel, the last of Eliza and Isabella's bachelor brothers, the sisters inherited over £400,000, which was a large fortune at that time.

Ruth Duffin, the first warden of Riddel Hall, noted in her writings that the sisters were devoted Unitarians, strongly charitable, and that their habits were simple and Victorian. The sisters preferred to ride in their old one-horse brougham long after motor cars became commonplace.

The Riddel sisters never took an active role in the family business or had the opportunity for third-level education themselves. Their family home at Beechmount, Falls Road is now an Irish-speaking school, Coláiste Feirste.

== Philanthropy ==
Other beneficiaries of the sisters' charity were the Royal Victoria Hospital, the Belfast Hospital for Sick Children, the Midnight Mission, the Society for Providing Nurses for the Sick Poor, and their own Rosemary Street congregation's Domestic Mission for the Poor of Belfast.

== Riddel Hall ==
The Misses Riddel donated £35,000 for the building and endowment of a halls of residence, with the understanding it was to be used for the female students of Queen's University.

This was an unusually large and generous amount for the education of women. When funds were raised, it was normally by a piecemeal combination of ladies' halls committees, local subscriptions and grants from bodies such as the Carnegie or Pfeiffer Trusts. At the time, only Emma Holt of the Liverpool University Women's Hall was giving on a similar scale.

In return, Eliza Riddel, the eldest sister, was made a member of the senate of Queen's University in 1912.

Both were appointed founder members of Riddel Hall's permanent committee. Governors of the permanent committee included the mayor of Belfast, the Church of Ireland Bishop of Down and five elected 'lady graduate governors' including F W Rea, one of the earliest women lecturers at Queen's, and Marion Andrews and Elizabeth Bell, two of the earliest women to qualify in medicine in Ireland.

A £14m redevelopment in 2011 added two additional buildings, extending the available teaching facilities and office space. Following the redevelopment, Queen's Management School (incorporating the William J Clinton Leadership Institute) was relocated to the site and officially opened by Mary McAleese in 2012. A further £28m development added another building which was officially opened in June 2023 by Joe Kennedy III.

== Endowment ==
In addition to the women's hall, a fund was set up to subsidise needy students. The endowment exists to this day although Riddel Hall itself was turned into offices in 1975.

== See also ==
- Henry Musgrave
