= Northern Resistance Movement =

Irish republican organisation

The Northern Resistance Movement was an Irish republican organisation set up by Sinn Féin and People's Democracy following the introduction of internment on 9 August 1971. Bernadette Devlin was involved in founding the group, which from time to time engaged the support of the Northern Ireland Civil Rights Association, with whom they organised the protest march which was attacked by the British state on Bloody Sunday. However their call for an end to Stormont meant that such relationships with more reformist organisations were not always smooth.

The Tyrone Central Civil Resistance Committee organised a meeting in Omagh on 17 October 1971, chaired by Frank McManus. With more than 40,000 households on rent-and-rate strike, primarily Council tenants, and with further refusals to pay money collected by the local state, Local Government virtually ground to a halt. As opposition councillors and businessmen withdrew from the councils and commissions, Newry, Strabane, Coalisland and other smaller towns were left with no town councils and the Government stepped in with the Payment for Debt (Emergency Powers) Act according to which anyone who owed money to the State and who refused to pay, was to have their debts paid by way of deductions from their State entitlements.

== Notable activists ==
- Miriam Daly
- Michael Farrell
- Fergus O'Hare
