= Coláiste Feirste =

School in Belfast, Northern Ireland

Location
- 7 Beechview Park; Belfast, County Antrim; Northern Ireland; 54°35′30″N 5°58′19″W

Information
- School type: Irish-medium
- Motto: Is Gael Mise (I am a Gael)
- Established: 1991, as Meánscoil Feirste
- School board: Education Authority (Belfast)
- Principal: Mícheal Mac Giolla Ghunna
- Teaching staff: 65
- Gender: Co-educational
- Enrolment: 842
- Colour
- Feeder schools: Irish-medium schools in the Greater Belfast area
- Website: colaistefeirste.org

Coláiste Feirste is the only secondary-level Irish-medium school in Belfast, Northern Ireland.

Previously known as Méanscoil Feirste, the gaelscoil (Irish language school) is located in the west of the city in a new facility on Belfast's Falls Road. Founded in 1991 with just nine pupils, as of 2022 the school had around 850 pupils and 65 teachers.

The school was first situated in Cultúrlann McAdam Ó Fiaich and was opened under the supervision of the first school principal Fergus O'Hare who was replaced in 2002 by Garaí Mac Roibeaird as principal. Mícheal Mac Giolla Ghunna has been principal since 2019. The school is now situated in Beechmount, the former home of the Riddel family.

== Notable former pupils ==
- Niall Ó Donnghaile - Former Lord Mayor of Belfast and Sinn Féin Senator in Seanad Éireann.
- Aisling Reilly - Two time singles World Handball Champion and current Sinn Féin MLA for West Belfast.
- Liam Óg Ó hAnnaidh - Rapper in the Belfast-based hip hop trio Kneecap

== See also ==
- List of secondary schools in Belfast
