= List of organisations in the Irish language movement =

The following is a list of Irish language organisations who form part of the Irish Language Movement. There is no coordinating organisation or body for the entire movement. Up until 2014 Comhdháil Náisiúnta na Gaeilge (The National Irish Language Congress) was the coordinating body of most of the Irish language movement on the island of Ireland but a new funding scheme implemented that year by Foras na Gaeilge ended funding to half of the organisations under Comhdháil's remit, including Comhdháil Náisiúnta na Gaeilge itself. As part of the same new funding process six funded lead organisations were announced by Foras na Gaeilge with extra funding. These are: Gael Linn, Gaeloideachas, Cumann na bhFiann, Conradh na Gaeilge, Oireachtas na Gaeilge and Glór na nGael.

Most of the below listed organisations are State-funded in the Republic of Ireland and/or Northern Ireland including the six Foras na Gaeilge-funded lead organisations.

- An Clár as Gaeilge Works to promote the Irish language in the business and community sector in Clare. Organised by the Ennis branch of Conradh na Gaeilge.
- An Chomhairle um Oideachas Gaeltachta & Gaelscolaíochta / COGG. The Council for Gaeltacht and Gaelscoileanna Education, Republic of Ireland.
- An Foras Pátrúnachta The largest patron body for Gaelscoileanna/Irish-language medium schools in the Republic of Ireland.
- Cairde Teo. Armagh-based Irish language organisation and social enterprise.
- Cill Dara le Gaeilge Kildare with Irish. Works to promote the Irish language in the business sector in Kildare.
- Comhairle na Gaelscolaíochta Council for Irish-Language Medium Education, Northern Ireland.
- CONCOS Irish language Summer colleges.
- Conradh na Gaeilge The Gaelic League. Oldest Irish language organisation in Ireland established in 1893 which today includes Oireachtas na Gaeilge, Ógras, Seachtain na Gaeilge and internet radio station Raidió Rí-Rá.
- Cumann na bhFiann Youth organisation for Irish speakers. See Coláiste na bhFiann.
- Feachtas Óg-Ghluaiseacht na Gaeilge. Youth organisation for Irish speakers.
- Foras na Gaeilge All-island body set up under the Good Friday Agreement. Includes An Gúm and An Coiste Téarmaíochta. Foras na Gaeilge replaced the Republic of Ireland-based Bord na Gaeilge.
- Forbairt Feirste Belfast-based Irish language organisation who have a strong focus on promoting the Irish language in the business sector in the city.
- Gael Linn National Irish language organisation established in 1953.
- Gaeloideachas Supports Irish language immersion education at preschool (outside the Gaeltacht) and primary and second level education across the Republic of Ireland.
- Gael-Taca Cork-based Irish language organisation.
- Gaillimh le Gaeilge Galway City-based Irish language organisation who promote the Irish language in the business sector in the county.
- Glór na nGael National Irish language organisation and national competition established in 1961.
- Gnó Mhaigh Eo Mayo-based Irish language organisation who promote the Irish language in the business sector in the county.

== Former organisations ==
- Bord na Gaeilge - Now subsumed into Foras na Gaeilge
- Comhdháil Náisiúnta na Gaeilge
- POBAL Northern Ireland.
- Eagraíocht na Scoileanna Gaeltachta - now subsumed into Gaeloideachas
- Gaelscoileanna Teo.- Now subsumed into Gaeloideachas
- Comhar na Múinteoirí Gaeilge
- Comharchumann Íde Naofa Teo
- Forbairt Naíonraí Teoranta - now subsumed into Comhar Naíonraí na Gaeltachta within the Gaeltacht and into Gaeloideachas in the rest of the Republic of Ireland.
- Parlaimint na mBan
- Comharchumann Íde Naofa Teo.
- Comhluadar

== See also ==
- Irish language Gaeilge.
- An Coimisinéir Teanga The Language Commissioner.
- Official Languages Act 2003
- Gaeltacht Irish speaking regions in Ireland.
- Gaeltacht Act 2012
- Údarás na Gaeltachta The Gaeltacht Authority.
- Bailte Seirbhísí Gaeltachta Gaeltacht Service Towns.
- Líonraí Gaeilge Irish Language Networks.
- 20-Year Strategy for the Irish Language 2010-2030
- List of Irish language media
- Gaelscoil Irish language-medium primary school- usually used to refer to Irish language medium secondary schools also.
- Gaelcholáiste Irish language-medium secondary school.
- Irish language in Northern Ireland
- Irish language outside Ireland
- Scottish Gaelic Gaeilge na hAlban / Gàidhlig.
