= Barna (disambiguation) =

Barna may refer to:

== People ==
- Barna (name)

== Places ==
=== Australia ===
- Barna, South Australia, a locality

=== Croatia ===
- Mala Barna, a village in Bjelovar-Bilogora County
- Velika Barna, a village in Bjelovar-Bilogora County

=== Ireland ===
- Barna (Irish: Bearna), a village in County Galway, Ireland
  - Barna GAC, a Gaelic Athletic Association club based in Barna, County Galway, Ireland
  - Barna Woods, an area of mixed broadleaf woodland located in County Galway, Ireland

=== Italy ===
- Cima de Barna, a mountain in the Lepontine Alps on the Swiss-Italian border
- Barna (Plesio), a village in Plesio, Italy

=== Hungary ===
- Bárna, Hungary

=== Romania ===
- Barna, a village in Parincea Commune, Bacău County
- Barna River, a tributary of the Someşul Cald
- Bârna, a commune in Timiș County

=== Spain ===
- Barcelona: locals call the city Barna, not Barça, which is mistakenly used by some foreigners (and refers to FC Barcelona).

== See also ==
- A nickname for Barcelona
- The Barna Group, public opinion research company founded by George Barna
- Barilius barna, a fish in genus Barilius of the family Cyprinidae
