= Knocknacarra =

Suburb of Galway City, Ireland

Knocknacarra Cnoc na Cathrach Knocknacarragh
- Suburb
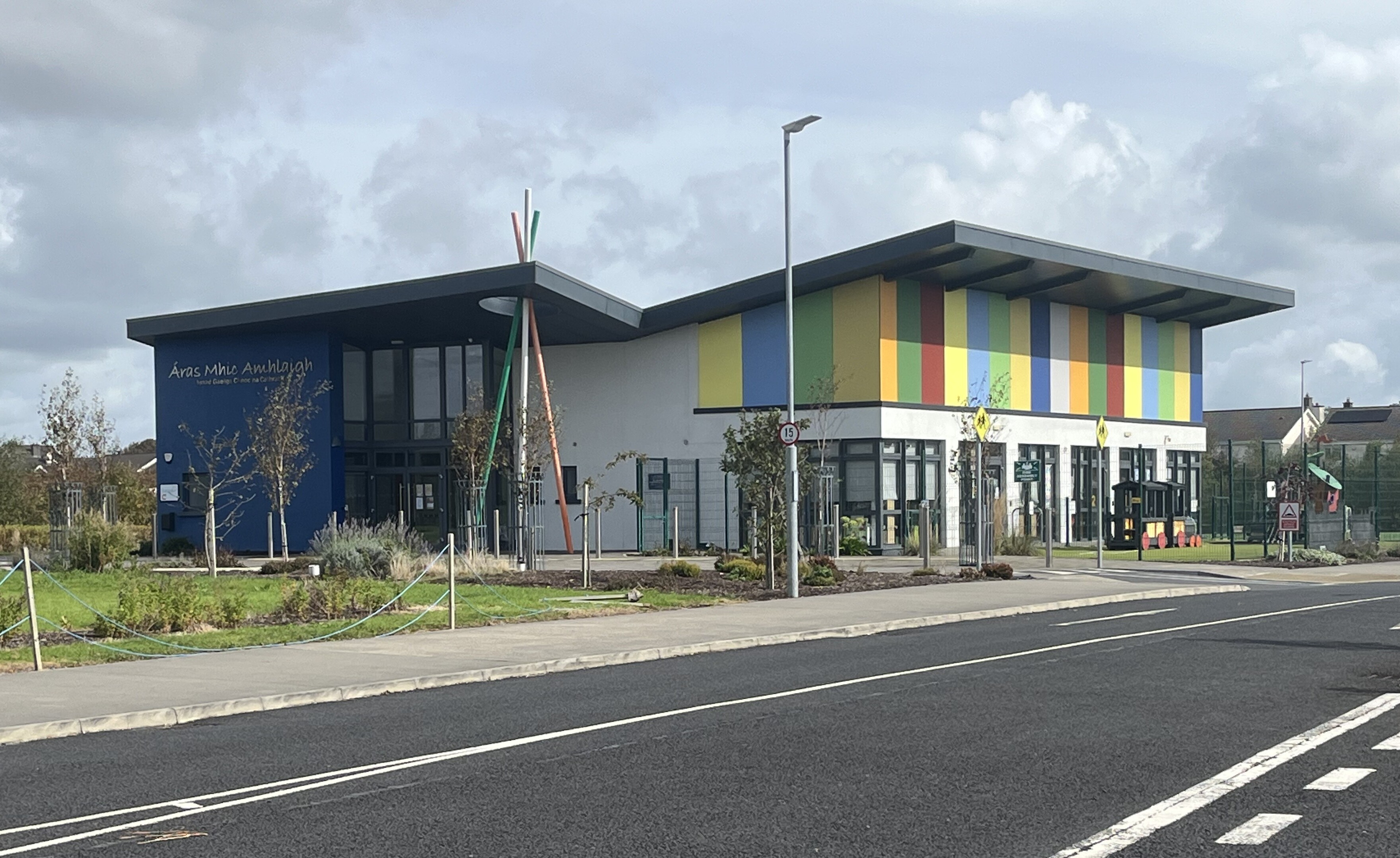
- Áras Mhic Amhlaigh, a hub for Irish language resources in Knocknacarra
- Interactive map of Knocknacarra
- Location in Ireland
- Coordinates: 53°15′47″N 9°07′01″W
- Country: Ireland
- Province: Connacht
- County: County Galway
- Local government area: Galway City Council
- Time zone: UTC+0 (WET)
  - Summer (DST): UTC+1 (IST (WEST))

Knocknacarra or Knocknacarragh (Irish: Cnoc na Cathrach) is a townland, electoral division and suburban area to the west of Galway city centre. As of 2018, Knocknacarra was described as one of Galway's fastest-growing suburbs. Its population rose, from over 12,000 in 2004, to approximately 17-18,000 people by 2021.

== Toponymy ==
Knocknacarra is the anglicisation of the Irish Cnoc na Cathrach, which the Placenames Database of Ireland entry translates as "hill of the (stone) ringfort". Other sources suggest that Cnoc na Cathrach means "hill of the city" or that the placename derives from Cnoc na Cara, meaning "hill of the stone crossing".

== Location ==
The townland of Knocknacarra (or Knocknacarragh) lies, on the shores of Galway Bay, within the civil parish of Rahoon and the historical barony of Galway.

The suburb of Knocknacarra lies approximately 5 kilometres west of Galway city centre. It borders Westside to the east, Salthill to the south-east and Barna to the west.

== History and development ==
Evidence of ancient settlement within Knocknacarra townland includes ringfort, horizontal watermill, holy well, enclosure and midden sites.

In the 1810s, 97 people were reported to be living in Knocknacarra. By 1913, Knocknacarra had a population of 153 people and it was considered a rural area.

In the 1970s, urban development had begun on Knocknacarra, and a sewage system was 'nearing completion' by 1973. In 1986, following a boundary extension under the Local Government (Reorganisation) Act 1985, Knocknacarra was transferred from Galway County Council to Galway Corporation (now Galway City Council).

While the area was still considered to be 'mostly fields' in the 1980s and 1990s, the area experienced significant development from the late 1990s both commercially and residentially.

== Amenities ==
While Knocknacarra is primarily a residential area, there are several shops, cafés and restaurants in the area. The main commercial centre is Gateway Retail Park, which contains Dunnes Stores, B&Q and Harvey Norman stores as well as an IKEA order point. The complex was constructed in 2007, with additional developments in 2020 and 2026. The local Dunnes branch is sometimes known locally as a 'fancy Dunnes' due to its homeware options, the size of its clothing section, as well as its instore deli, cheese-monger and other facilities. There is also a Lidl and an Aldi in the surrounding area. In addition, there is a smaller retail development located in the Kingston area, and comprises mainly of a Tesco (formerly Joyces).

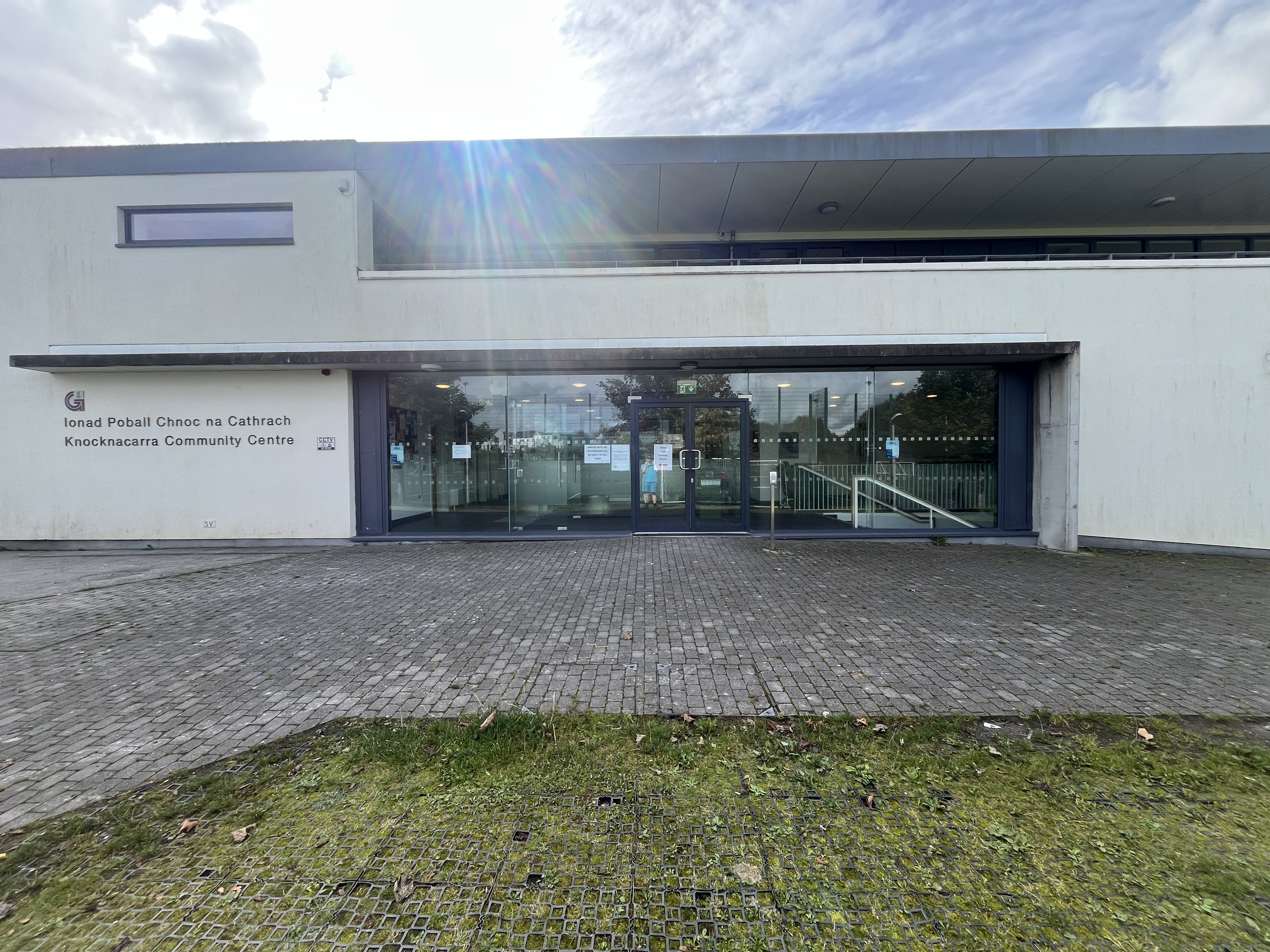
Knocknacarra Community Centre

The area is home to a public park, Cappagh Park, which connects directly into Barna Woods. As of September 2026, a further public park was proposed for development between Miller's Lane and Kingston. Knocknacarra Community Centre, located in Cappagh Park, which has a bookable hall and meeting rooms, is one of three community centres run by Galway City Council.

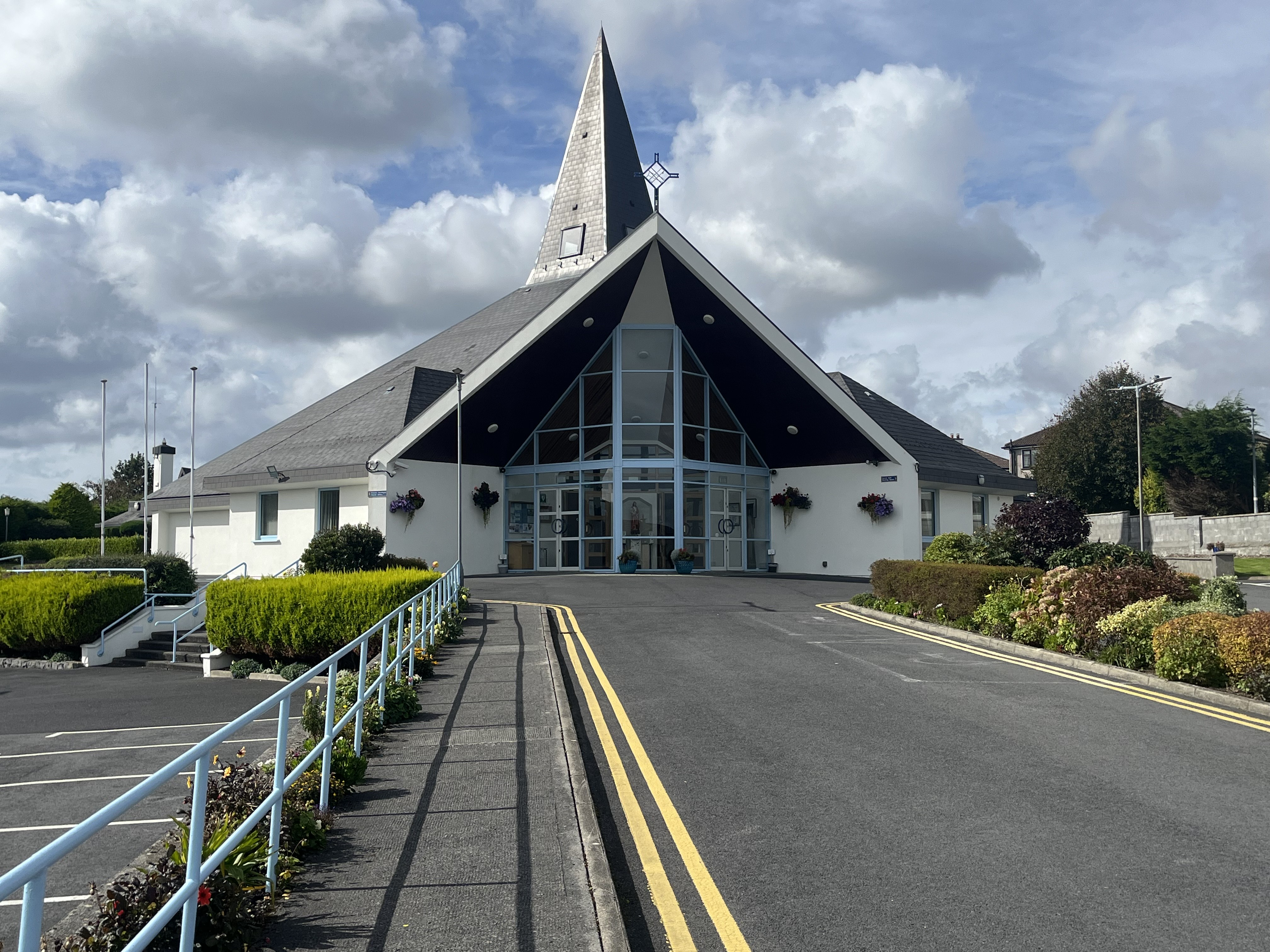
Catholic Church in Knocknacarra dedicated to Saint John The Apostle

Knocknacarra's Catholic church, dedicated to St John the Apostle, is within the Roman Catholic Diocese of Galway, Kilmacduagh and Kilfenora.

== Sport ==
Knocknacarra FC (based at Cappagh Park) and Galway Bohemians F.C. (based at Millars Lane) are the local football teams in the area, with both senior sides competing in the Galway & District League.

The local Gaelic Athletic Association (GAA) club is Salthill–Knocknacarra GAA.

Rugby is played by Galway Bay Rugby Club, formerly Barna Knocknacarra Rugby Club, and was established in the area in 2007.

== Transport ==
Road travel in Knocknacarra is centred on two main roads, Western Distributor Road, a 2.9-kilometre route running west–east between the Cappagh Roundabout and the Deane Roundabout, and Kingston Road, running through Seacrest to the R336. There are also cycle lanes running along Western Distributer Road and Bóthar Stiofáin.

The area is served by several bus routes operated by Bus Éireann and CityDirect, running from the suburb into Eyre Square and the city centre. These are the 402, 405, 410, 411 and 412. There are plans to expand bus services in the area under BusConnects.

There has been some criticism of traffic congestion and public transport options in the Knocknacarra area. In a survey conducted by the National Transport Authority, 50% of respondents expressed approval for a proposed bus route from Gateway Retail Park in Knocknacarra to Oranmore, the highest approval rate among the routes considered.

== Irish language ==
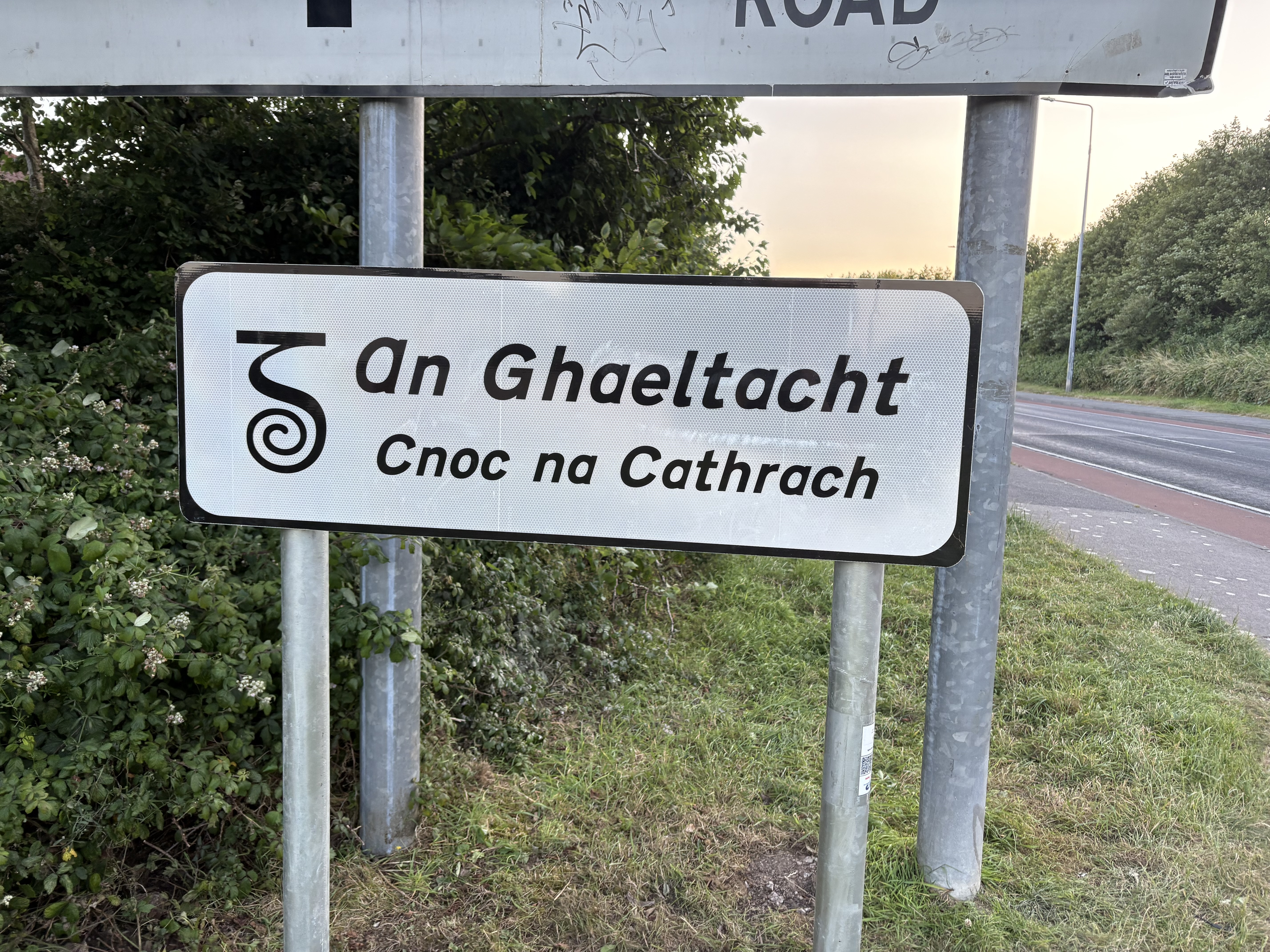
Sign in Knocknacarra off Western Distributor Road reading "An Ghaeltacht Cnoc na Cathrach"

As of 2026, parts of western and southern Knocknacarra are within the Gaeltacht area. Together with nearby Barna, Knocknacarra is also in a "Language Planning Area" which means that government funding is available to promote the Irish language in the area.

An Irish language centre, Áras Mhic Amhlaigh, was opened in Knocknacarra in September 2022. The building is used on weekdays as a naíonra (Irish speaking pre-school) which is run by the nearby Gaelscoil Mhic Amhlaigh.

== Education ==
The only secondary school in Knocknacarra, Coláiste Na Coiribe, is an exclusively Irish-speaking school (or Gaelcholáiste). Coláiste Éinde and Salerno, in Salthill, are also nearby.

The local primary schools include Gaelscoil Mhic Amhlaigh, St. John the Apostle (Knocknacarra) NS, and Knocknacarra Educate Together NS.

== See also ==
- Galway City West electoral area
- Proposed light rail developments for Galway City
