= Barna (name) =

Barna is both a surname and a given name. Notable people with the name include:

Surname:

- Adriana Barna (born 1978), Romanian-German tennis player
- Alexandru Barna (born 1993), Romanian footballer
- Anca Barna (born 1977), Romanian-German tennis player
- Andrej Barna (born 1998), Serbian swimmer
- Babe Barna (1915–1972), American baseball player
- Dan Barna (born 1975), Romanian politician and lawyer
- Daniel Barna (born 1986), Romanian footballer
- Dilshad Barna (1800–1905), Central Asian poet
- Ferdinánd Barna (1825–1895), Hungarian linguist, translator, and librarian
- Frigyes Barna (1896–1958), Hungarian ice hockey player
- George Barna, Christian sociologist
- George Barna (American football) (1908–1972), American football and lacrosse player
- Hayley Barna (born 1983), American business executive
- János Barna, known as Iosif Stibinger (1923–1949), Romanian footballer
- József Braun (also known as József Barna; 1901–1943), Hungarian Olympic footballer
- Laszlo Barna (born 1948), Hungarian-Canadian television producer
- Minhaj Barna (1923–2011), Pakistani veteran journalist and trade union leader
- Oleh Barna (1967–2023), Ukrainian human rights activist and politician
- Petr Barna (born 1966), Czech figure skater
- Ramya Barna (born 1986), Indian actress
- Stepan Barna (born 1979), Ukrainian political activist and politician, brother of Oleh
- Stephanie Barna, American military officer, attorney, and civil servant
- Szabolcs Barna (born 1996), Hungarian footballer
- Viktor Barna (1911–1972), Hungarian-British table tennis player

Given name:

- Barna Bajkó (born 1984), Romanian footballer
- Barna Basilides (1903–1967), Hungarian painter
- Barna Benczenleitner (born 2003), Hungarian footballer
- Barna Bor (born 1986), Hungarian judoka
- Barna Buza (1873–1944), Hungarian politician and jurist
- Barna Dobos (born 1970), Hungarian football manager
- Barna Kabay (born 1948), Hungarian film director, screenwriter, and film producer
- Barna Kesztyűs (born 1994), Hungarian footballer
- Barna Liebháber (1946–2024), Hungarian footballer
- Barna Papucsek (born 1989), Hungarian footballer
- Barna Putics (born 1984), Hungarian handball player
- Barna Saha, Indian-American theoretical computer scientist
- Barna da Siena, Sienese painter
- Barna Szabó (born 1935), Hungarian-American engineer and educator
- Barna Tánczos (born 1976), Romanian politician
- Barna Tóth (born 1995), Hungarian footballer
