= Fáinne =

Pin badge to encourage communication in the Irish language

Piaras Béaslaí wearing an Fáinne.

Fáinne (Irish: [ˈfˠaːn̠ʲə]; pl. Fáinní but often Fáinnes in English) is the name of a pin badge worn to show fluency in, or a willingness to speak, the Irish language.

The three modern versions of the pin as relaunched in 2014 by Conradh na Gaeilge are the Fáinne Óir (gold circle), Seanfháinne (old fáinne/circle) and Fáinne Airgid (silver circle).

In other contexts, fáinne simply means 'ring' or 'circle' and is also used to give such terms as fáinne pósta ('wedding ring'), fáinne an lae ('daybreak'), Tiarna na bhFáinní (The Lord of the Rings), and fáinne cluaise ('earring').

== An Fáinne Úr ==
An Fáinne Úr (úr meaning 'new') is the modernised rendition of the Fáinne, having been updated in 2014 by Conradh na Gaeilge. There are three versions presently available, none requiring test or certification:

1. Fáinne Óir ('gold Fáinne') – for fluent speakers;
2. Fáinne Mór Óir' (literally, 'large gold Fáinne') – traditional larger, old style solid 9ct gold, the style worn by Liam Neeson in his film portrayal of Michael Collins;
3. Fáinne Airgid' ('silver Fáinne') – for speakers with a basic working knowledge of the language.

== An Fáinne ==
(The Original Organisation)

Two Irish language organisations, An Fáinne (est. 1916) ("The Ring" or "The Circle" in Irish) and the Society of Gaelic Writers (est. 1911), were founded by Piaras Béaslaí (1881–1965).

They were intended to work together to a certain extent, the former promoting the language and awarding those fluent in its speaking with a Fáinne Óir (Gold Ring) lapel pin, and the latter would promote and create a pool of quality literary works in the language.

All the personnel actively involved in promoting the concept of An Fáinne were associated with Conradh na Gaeilge, and from an early time, An Fáinne used the Dublin postal address of 25 Cearnóg Pharnell / Parnell Square, the then HQ of Conradh na Gaeilge though the organisations were officially separate, at least at first.

The effectiveness of the organisation was acknowledged in the Dáil Éireann on 6 August 1920, when Richard Mulcahy, the Sinn Féin Teachta Dála for Clontarf suggested that a league on the model of the Fáinne for the support of Irish manufactures might be established.

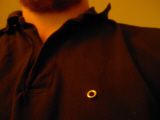
A Gaeilgeoir (an Irish speaker) wearing a Fáinne

The Fáinne lapel pins were, at first, a limited success. They appealed mainly to Nationalists and Republicans, for whom the language was generally learnt as adults as a second language. The appeal to people for whom Irish was the native tongue was limited. They spoke Irish, as did everyone from their village, so there was no point whatsoever wearing a pin to prove it, even if they could have afforded one, or for that matter, even known they existed.

In the early 1920s, many people who earned their Fáinne did so in prison, the majority of these being anti-treaty Irish Republican Army (IRA) Volunteers during the Irish Civil War.

== History ==
According to Piaras Béaslaí's own article in the magazine Iris An Fháinne in 1922, he states that in the winter of 1915 the language movement was at a low ebb due to lack of funds and a large portion of the best Gaels being so involved in the work of the volunteers that they were forgetting about speaking Irish. He says he wrote an article in The Leader proposing that Gaels establish an association of those who would take a solemn oath to only speak Irish at certain events and to other Gaeilgeoirí and that they should wear a clear symbol.

The article got many letters in favour and against, but two men, Tadhg Ó Scanaill and Colm Ó Murchadha, came to him asking him to organise a meeting towards setting up a council. He says that it was they who set the whole thing up. He says that he went to speak to Cú Uladh (Peadar Mac Fhionnlaíoch 1856–1942), then vice president of Conradh na Gaeilge, and he highly praised the idea.

The meeting was organised for some time in the spring of 1916 in Craobh an Chéitinnigh (the Keating Branch). They went to a 'seanchus' prior to their own meeting in the Ard Chraobh (High Branch) and presented their idea to all those present. They were so taken with the idea that they all came with them to their own meeting in Craobh an Chéitinnigh.

Cú Uladh was there before them and at this meeting and they decided they would (1) form the association and (2) name it "An Fáinne" instead of "An Fáinne Gaedhalach", which was proposed by Colm Ó Murchadha, and three officers were elected to conduct the work of the association.

Piaras supposes that Tadhg Ó Sganaill first thought of the Fáinne (ring) as the symbol. It was an inspired idea, he says, because no one had even thought of this symbol when the name was first proposed.

He states at the end of the article that they had only begun the work of the committee when Easter Week arrived and some of the small amount that were involved were snatched away, but he says, the work continued and the world knows how they well they got on since then.

=== Recognition ===
The consistently high standard required to qualify for the Fáinne at this time made them quite prestigious, and there are many reports of people being recruited as night-school teachers of Irish-based purely on the fact they wore the pin.

The President of the Executive Council of the Irish Free State, W. T. Cosgrave acknowledged the Fáinne on 8 February 1924 as an indicator of Irish Language proficiency.

=== Demise ===
The fact that the underlying reason many Fáinne wearers had studied Irish was political meant that the semi-independence of the Irish Free State, and the later complete independence of the Irish Republic, along with a period of relative peace in the new province of Northern Ireland, meant they had, to some extent, achieved their aim. Twenty years or so later, a Fáinne would be a very rare sight. Due to lack of demand they were no longer manufactured, and the organisation had fizzled out.

== 'An Fáinne Nua' ==
Conradh na Gaeilge and other Irish-language bodies attempted a revival, circa 1965, of the Fáinne, which, for a short time at least, became successful: An Fáinne Nua ('The New Fáinne') was marketed with the slogan Is duitse an Fáinne Nua! – meaning "The New Fáinne is for you!."

It came in three varieties:

- An Fáinne Nua Óir (The new Gold Fáinne),
- An Fáinne Nua Airgid (The new Silver Fáinne),
- An Fáinne Nua Daite (The new coloured Fáinne).

The Gold Fáinne was manufactured from 9ct Gold, whilst the other two were sterling silver. The Coloured Fáinne also had an enamel blue ring separating two concentric silver circles. The prices for the Gold, Silver and Coloured varieties in 1968 were twelve shillings and sixpence, four shillings and five shillings respectively.

They were popular in Ireland during the 1960s–1970s, but fell into relative disuse shortly afterwards. Included among reasons commonly given for this were that the change in fashion made it impractical to wear a lapel pin; the resumption of hostilities in Northern Ireland making people either not wanting to show publicly a "love for things Irish" for fear of intimidation; or, for the more radical elements to place "Irishness" second to "freedom".

== Non-Fáinne variations ==
=== Cúpla Focal badge ===
As cúpla focal means "a couple of words". The Conradh na Gaeilge website notes that this badge is "Suitable for anyone who has a few words of Irish."

=== Béal na nGael ===
The Béal na nGael (Mouth of the Irish) is a different pin badge that shows a face with spiked hair and an open mouth. It was developed by the students of the Gaelcholáiste Reachrann gaelscoil and marketed primarily to youth in the Dublin Area. "The aim of the badge is to let the world know that the user is both willing and able to speak Irish, and the students say that what they are promoting is 'a practical product to stimulate more peer-to-peer communication through Irish.'" "The badge won't threaten the place of the Fáinne, they say, because their target market is an age group which is not wearing the Fáinne and which, their market research suggests, is in many cases not even aware that the Fáinne exists. They hope this target market will latch on to the badge and wear it as an invitation to others to speak to them in Irish."
