= POBAL =

Umbrella organization for the Irish language movement in Northern Ireland

POBAL was an umbrella organisation for the Irish language movement in Northern Ireland, which was formed in 1998 and closed in 2019. The organisation was funded by the UK Department for Social Development and Belfast City Council. It received funding from Foras na Gaeilge until 2014. Formerly registered as a charity with the Charity Commission for Northern Ireland, it campaigned for an Irish Language Act to be enacted for Northern Ireland that is similar to language acts in the Republic of Ireland, Wales and Scotland. Its director was Janet Muller.

== See also ==
- Irish language in Northern Ireland
- Forbairt Feirste - Belfast-based Irish language group
- Líonraí Gaeilge - Irish Language Networks
- List of organisations in Irish Language Movement
