= Gaelcholáiste Reachrann =

School in Donaghmede, Dublin, Ireland

Location
- Donaghmede, Dublin; Ireland
- Coordinates: 53.400492°N 6.156593°W

Information
- Motto: Solas an Léinn (The Light of Learning)
- Religious affiliation: Inter Denominational
- Established: 2001
- Principal: Eimer Nic an Rí
- Gender: Mixed
- Enrollment: 499
- Website: https://gcreachrann.ie/

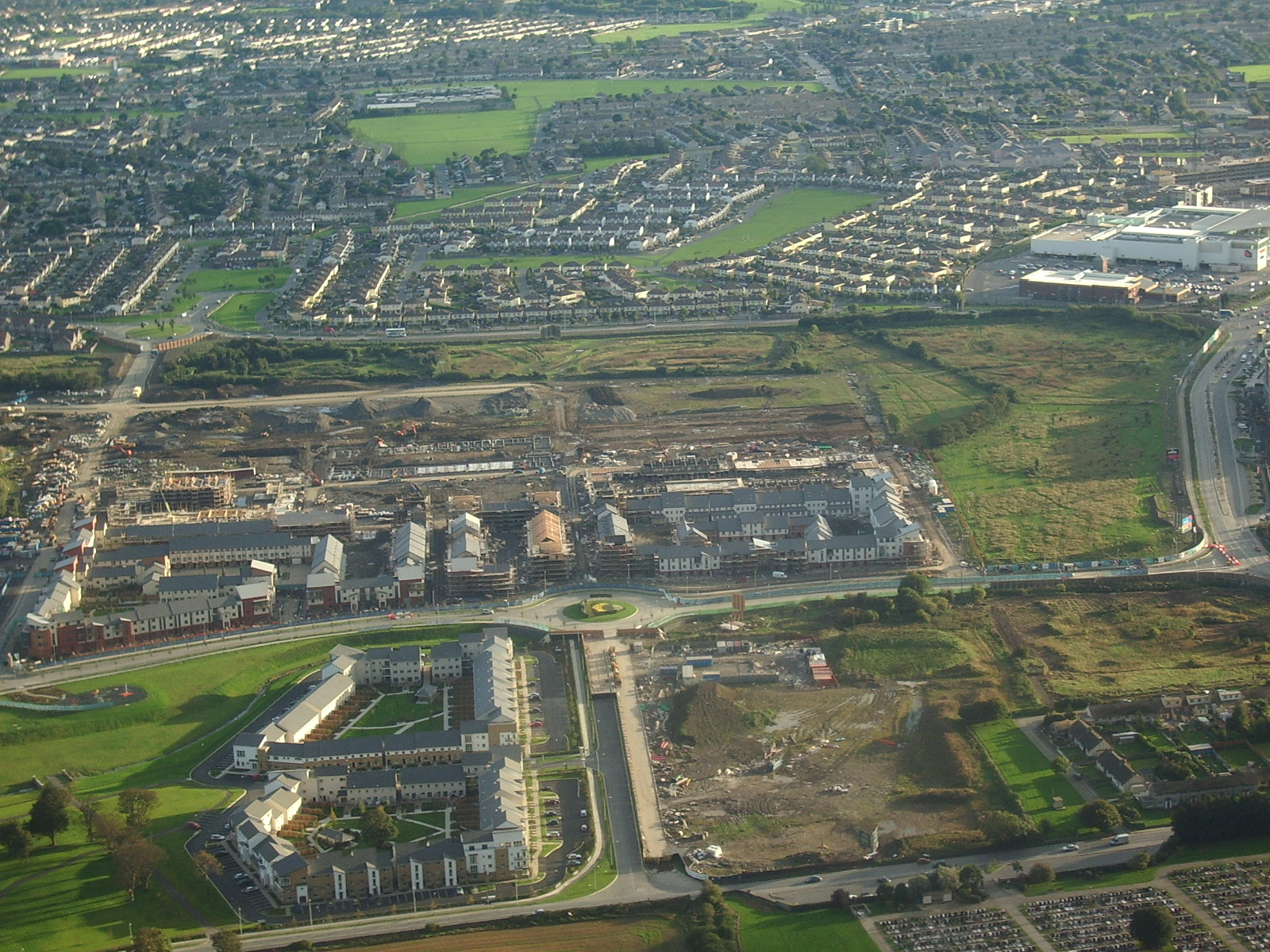
Dublin suburb of (Balgriffin) from airplane. Left foreground: Burnell/Samsons court residential estates. Right foreground: Balgriffin road and cemetery. Left middleground: Temple view residential estate. Right middleground: Clare Hall shopping centre. Background: Donaghies/Donaghmede.

Gaelcholáiste Reachrann is an Irish-speaking secondary school (Irish: gaelcholáiste), located in Donaghmede, Dublin in Ireland. The school is under the patronage of the Dublin and Dún Laoghaire Education and Training Board. Reachrann shares a premises with Grange Community College. In the 2020/21 school year, Gaelcholáiste Reachrann (GCR) had an enrollment of 499 students. The school was ranked 1st in its area by the Irish Times in the 2019 Good Schools Guide. It is ranked 3rd best secondary school in Ireland as of 2025

== History ==
Gaelcholáiste Reachrann was founded in September 2001. The school's first Junior Certificate examinations were held in 2004, and its first Leaving Certificate examinations in 2007.

The founding principal was Fionnuala Ní Chaisil, followed by Máire Ní Ghealbháin. As of 2021, the principal was Eimer Nic an Rí.

The school was the subject of media coverage due to their development and marketing of the "Béal na nGael" badge. "The aim of the badge is to let the world know that the user is both willing and able to speak Irish, and the students say that what they are promoting is 'a practical product to stimulate more peer-to-peer communication through Irish.'" The Béal na nGael is a modern variant of the Fáinne, a badge worn to indicate a degree of fluency in, and willingness to communicate in, the Irish language.

In 2018, Reachrann was featured in an article in the Irish Independent, entitled "Schools build relationships to inspire better performance" where its academic success was discussed.

== Academics ==
Gaelcholáiste Reachrann offers the Irish Junior Cycle and Leaving Certificate curricula. The school also operates the Transition Year programme, which is mandatory for all students in the college. All subjects are taught through the medium of Irish.

== Sport ==
Gaelcholáiste Reachrann fields teams in Gaelic football, hurling, camogie, soccer, basketball, and badminton.

In January 2020, one of the school's students played on the Irish U18 football team in an international friendly against Australia, where the Irish team won 2-0.

In 2016, Reachrann won both the Dublin and Leinster Gaelic Football championships, however, the team lost the All-Ireland final by 4 points to Mayo's St. Joseph's C.C.

In May 2013, Reachrann became the Dublin hurling champions, after defeating Coolmine Community School 4-5 to 3-5 in the Dublin Schools Juvenile Hurling final.

In February 2024, the school’s boy’s Senior Gaelic Football team won the Dublin Senior “C” championship for the first time in their history, defeating Coláiste Cois Life in the final on a scoreline of 4-11 to 1-9. They were beaten in the Leinster final by Mercy College, Ballymahon.

On 27 January 2025, the senior football team retained their Dublin “C” title by defeating St. Mac Dara’s on a scoreline of 3-5 to 1-6. The team again progressed to the Leinster final, this time to face O’Carolan’s of Nobber on 7 February 2025. Gaelcholáiste Reachrann triumphed on a scoreline of 2-7 to 0-11 to become Leinster Champions for the first time in their history at “C” level.

== Extra-curricular activities ==
Gaelcholáiste Reachrann participates in the annual BT Young Scientist and Technology Exhibition. In 2018, one of their students achieved 3rd place in the intermediate individual category in the Biological and Ecological Sciences section.

The school has a Grúpa Ceoil which rehearses and performs Irish Traditional Music. This traditional music group has performed in public on many occasions, most notably in the DDLETB Festival of Music, Gael Linn's Scléip and Trócaire's Trad for Trócaire.

In 2015 the school won the "Best Production" (Scothléiriú na Féile) award in the Féile Náisiúnta Scoildrámaíochta in Mullingar with their performance of the play Miotach. The play also won the award for Best Costumes in the Bord Gáis Energy Student Theater Awards.

== See also ==
- Gaeloideachas
