= Gaelcholáiste Chill Dara =

Secondary school in County Kildare, Ireland

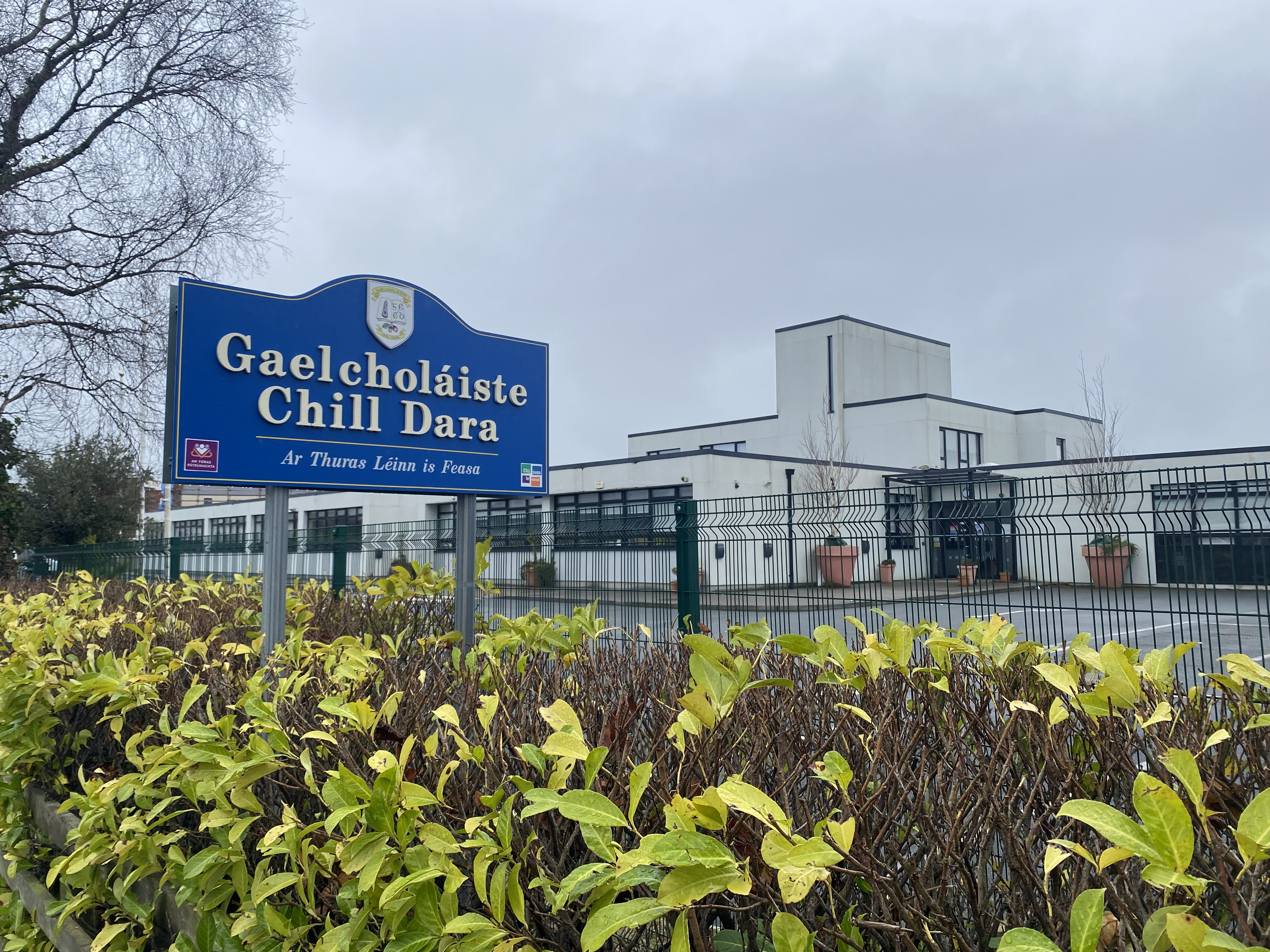

Location
- Naas, County Kildare; Ireland
- Coordinates: 53.2158°N 6.6691°W

Information
- Established: 2003; 23 years ago
- Enrollment: c. 340 (2018)
- Language: Irish

Gaelcholáiste Chill Dara is an Irish language secondary level school (a Gaelcholáiste) in Naas, County Kildare, in Ireland.

The school, which welcomed its first pupils in September 2003, was originally based in Newbridge, before moving to a premises at The Curragh. It has been at its current site, in Naas, since 2010. The school's patron is An Foras Pátrúnachta. As of 2018, there were approximately 340 pupils attending Gael-Choláiste Chill Dara.
