= Comhdháil Náisiúnta na Gaeilge =

- Logo of Comhdháil Náisiúnta na Gaeilge
- Abbreviation: CNnaG
- Formation: 1943
- Founder: Dathi O'Farrell
- Dissolved: 14 July 2014
- Type: Non-governmental organisation
- Headquarters: 46 Sráid Chill Dara, Dublin 2, Ireland
- Fields: Irish language promotion
- Staff: 6 (2014)
- Website: gaelport.com

Comhdháil Náisiúnta na Gaeilge (CNnaG) was the central steering council for a number of organisations involved in the promotion of the Irish language. Its mission was to "strengthen and consolidate goodwill and support for the Irish language and its usage as a living language so that it may be used freely and widely in all aspects of Irish life".

== History ==
The organisation was established in 1943. It was set up to act as a coordinating umbrella body for voluntary Irish language organisations. The board of the not-for-profit organisation was made up of representatives of its member organisations. As of 2011, there were 24 member organisations, including Conradh na Gaeilge, Gael Linn, Gael-Taca and Oireachtas na Gaeilge.

On 30 June 2014, the inter-governmental agency established to promote the Irish language throughout the island of Ireland, Foras na Gaeilge, ceased funding to the organisation. The last meeting of the board of management of the 70-year-old organisation was held on the evening of 14 July 2014. The minutes of the last meeting recorded that the management board of Comhdháil Náisiúnta na Gaeilge felt it had no choice but to cease all activities. The organisation's six remaining staff members were made redundant.

== Activities ==
The organisation saw its role as providing leadership to those involved in community and voluntary work on behalf of the Irish language; to provide analysis of government policies with reference to the language and the development and promotion of new policy measures. In practice this meant developing policies which are broadly acceptable to all member organisations, and the undertaking of related projects. The organisation also described itself as the "primary language lobby dealing with State legislation".

The secretaria of An Chomhdháil was responsible for the day-to-day running of the organisation.

== Gaelport website ==
The information website Gaelport.com was a project managed by staff of Comhdháil Náisiúnta na Gaeilge. The website contained information on Irish language news and events as well as Irish language classes and vacancies. It also contained information on advocacy work carried out by Comhdháil Náisiúnta na Gaeilge and other Irish language organisations. The website won best Irish language website at the 2010 Irish Web Awards.
