= An Foras Pátrúnachta =

Patron body for Irish-medium schools in Ireland

- The Patronage Foundation
- Formation: 1993
- Registration no.: 12240
- Legal status: Charity
- Location: Ireland

An Foras Pátrúnachta na Scoileanna Lán-Ghaeilge Teoranta is the largest patron body of Irish-language schools (gaelscoileanna) in the Republic of Ireland. It was founded in 1993 to act as an alternative patron body for gaelscoileanna. The organisation's name is usually abbreviated to An Foras Pátrúnachta. 70 gaelscoileanna, which constitutes as of September 2017 44% of all the gaelscoileanna in the Republic of Ireland, are under the patronage of An Foras. In late 2017, they announced that from September 2018, school students under their patronage in schools would learn a third language alongside Irish and English in both primary and second-level and be taught one subject through that language. The organisation's secretary general (ard-rúnaí) is Caoimhín Ó hEaghra. He is a brother of Irish journalists Cormac Ó hEaghra and Róisín O'Hara.

== See also ==
- Gaelscoil
- Gaeloideachas
- An Chomhairle um Oideachas Gaeltachta & Gaelscolaíochta
- Department of Education and Youth
