= Tornaľa =

Tornaľa Tornalja
- Municipality
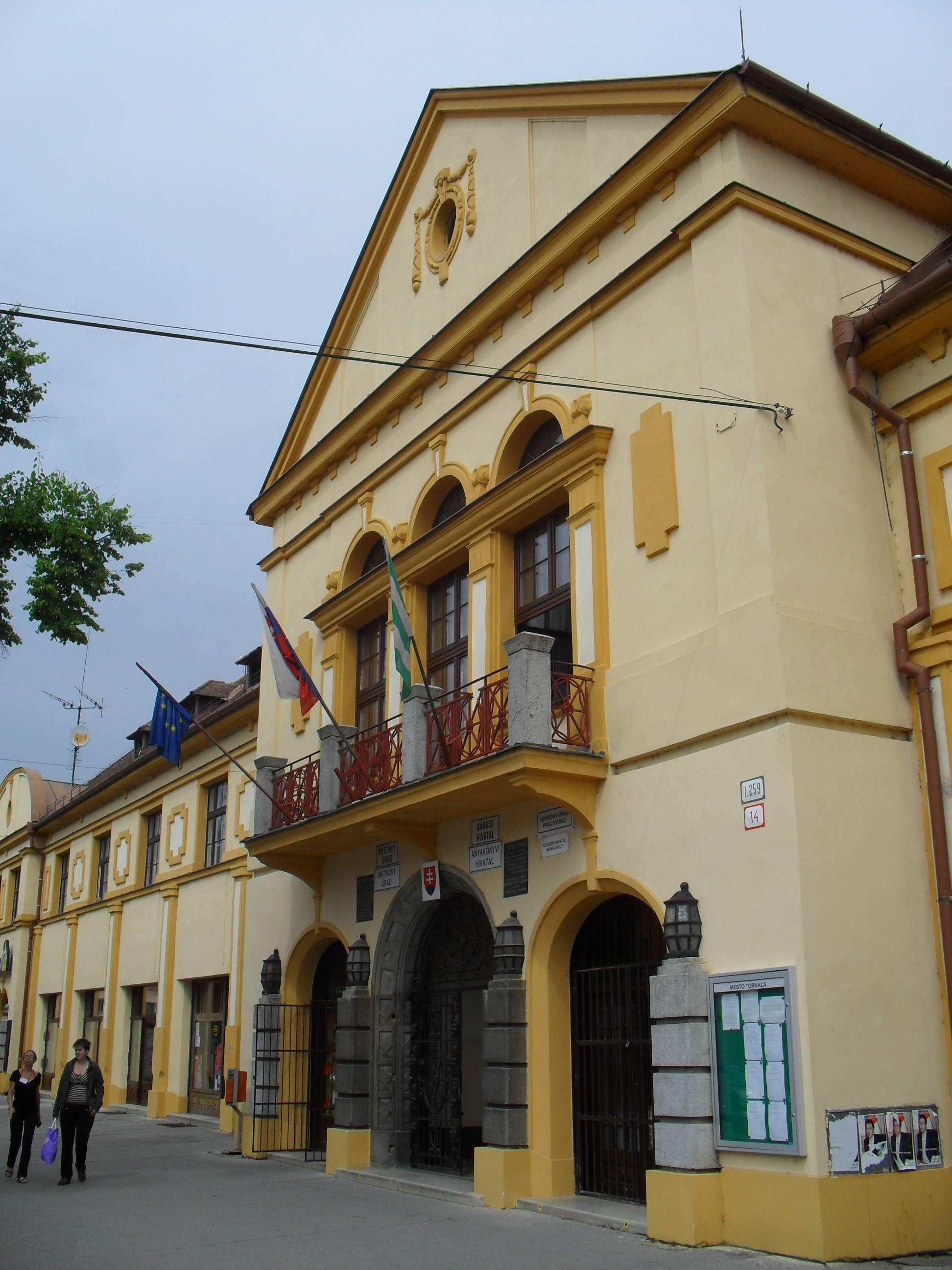
- Town hall

- Flag Coat of arms

- Location of Tornaľa in the Banská Bystrica Region Location of Tornaľa in Slovakia
- Coordinates: 48.42°N 20.33°E
- Country: Slovakia
- Region: Banská Bystrica Region
- District: Revúca District
- First mentioned: 1245

Government
  - Mayor: Erika Győrfi (Hlas, Szövetség–Aliancia, We Are Family)

Area
  - Total: 57.76 km^{2} (22.30 sq mi)
- Elevation: 182 m (597 ft)

Population (2025)
  - Total: 6,646
- Time zone: UTC+1 (CET)
  - Summer (DST): UTC+2 (CEST)
- Postal code: 982 01
- Area code: +421 47
- Vehicle registration plate (until 2022): RA
- Website: www.mestotornala.sk

Tornaľa (formerly Šafárikovo, Hungarian: Tornalja) is a town and municipality in Revúca District in the Banská Bystrica Region of Slovakia, with a population of approximately 7,000.

== History ==
The first written record of the settlement dates back from 1245. The town was located in the Kingdom of Hungary until the second half of the 19th century. During the periods 1554 - 1593 and 1596 - 1686, Tornaľa was ruled by the Ottoman Empire as part of Filek sanjak with its centre in Rimaszombat). Before the establishment of independent Czechoslovakia in 1918, Tornaľa was part of Gömör and Kishont County within the Kingdom of Hungary. From 1938 to 1944, it was again part of Hungary as a result of the First Vienna Award. On 19 December 1944, Soviet troops of the 2nd Ukrainian Front entered Tornaľa. It became part of Czechoslovakia once again.

== Geography ==
The municipality lies at an altitude of 182 metres (597 ft) and covers an area of 57.76 km^{2} (22.30 sq mi) (2025). It is located in the historical Gemer region and lies on the Slaná river.

== Population ==
Historical population
Year	Pop.	±%
1970	6,436	—
1980	7,021	+9.1%
1991	8,185	+16.6%
2001	8,169	−0.2%
2011	7,509	−8.1%
2021	6,971	−7.2%
Source: Censuses

Population statistic (10 years)
Year	1995	2005	2015	2025
Count	8445	7991	7310	6646
Difference		−5.37%	−8.52%	−9.08%

Population statistic
Year	2024	2025
Count	6702	6646
Difference		−0.83%

It has a population of 6646 people (31 December 2025).

=== Ethnicity ===
Census 2021 (1+ %)
Ethnicity	Number	Fraction
Hungarian	4343	62.3%
Slovak	2318	33.25%
Not found out	583	8.36%
Romani	414	5.93%
Total	6971	

In year 2021 was 6971 people by ethnicity 4343 as Hungarian, 2318 as Slovak, 583 as Not found out, 414 as Romani, 30 as Czech, 15 as Other, 10 as Chinese, 10 as Ukrainian, 6 as Bulgarian, 5 as Russian, 4 as Polish, 3 as French, 3 as English, 2 as German, 1 as Jewish, 1 as Austrian, 1 as Canadian and 1 as Croatian.

Note on population: The difference values of population numbers in the table "Population statistic" and in the sections "Ethnicity" & "Religion" is caused by the use of various statistical methods.

=== Religion ===
Census 2021 (1+ %)
Religion	Number	Fraction
Roman Catholic Church	2541	36.45%
None	2219	31.83%
Calvinist Church	1012	14.52%
Not found out	493	7.07%
Evangelical Church	424	6.08%
Jehovah's Witnesses	111	1.59%
Greek Catholic Church	81	1.16%
Total	6971	

In year 2021 was 6971 people by religion 2541 from Roman Catholic Church, 2219 from None, 1012 from Calvinist Church, 493 from Not found out, 424 from Evangelical Church, 111 from Jehovah's Witnesses, 81 from Greek Catholic Church, 16 from Other and not ascertained christian church, 15 from Other, 11 from United Methodist Church, 9 from Old Catholic Church, 8 from Jewish community, 8 from Christian Congregations in Slovakia, 7 from Eastern Orthodox Church, 4 from Paganism and natural spirituality, 4 from Hinduism, 4 from Buddhism, 2 from Ad hoc movements, 1 from Czechoslovak Hussite Church and 1 from Church of Jesus Christ of Latter-day Saints.

== Notable people ==
- Barna Basilides (1903–1967), Hungarian painter

== Twin towns — sister cities ==
Tornaľa is twinned with:

- Heves, Hungary
- Putnok, Hungary
- Tarnów, Poland
- Valea lui Mihai, Romania
