= Gaeloideachas =

Organization supporting the development of Irish-medium schools

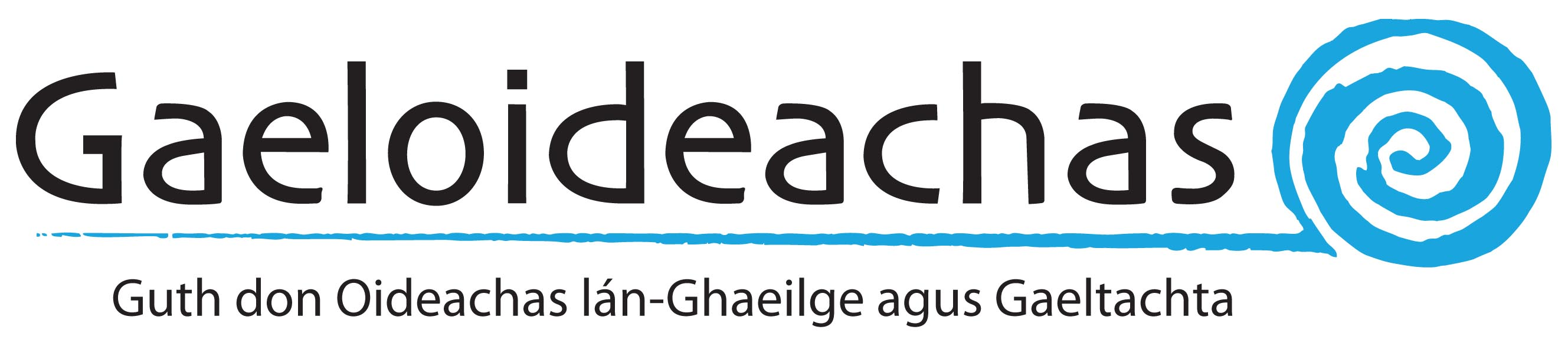
- Formation: 1973 (as Gaelscoileanna Teo.)
- Type: Nonprofit
- Registration no.: RCN 20042394
- Purpose: "Advancement of education"
- Location: Dublin, Ireland
- Official language: Irish language
- Chief Executive: Bláthnaid Ní Ghréacháin (as of 2018)
- Funding: Foras na Gaeilge
- Staff: 9 (2023)
- Website: gaeloideachas.ie

Gaeloideachas is a voluntary organisation in Ireland which aims support the development of Irish-medium schools. It supports the development of Irish language schools at preschool (outside the Gaeltacht) and primary and secondary levels in the Republic of Ireland. Originally formed in 1973 as Gaelscoileanna Teo, and following a reorganisation and an expansion in remit, it was renamed to Gaeloideachas in 2016. (Note: In Irish, scoileanna (in Gaelscoileanna) refers to "schools", while oideachas (in Gaeloideachas) to "education" (more generally).)

== History ==
=== Formation ===
The organisation was established in 1973 as Gaelscoileanna Teo. Its remit was primarily to support Gaelscoileanna (Irish-medium schools at primary and secondary level), and to support those "wishing to set up [such] schools".

=== Reorganisation ===
In 2014, as part of a reorganisation of how funding was allocated through Foras na Gaeilge (FnaG), Gaelscoileanna Teo was appointed as one of the six "lead" Foras na Gaeilge-funded Irish language organisations- with a responsibility for the support of Irish-language medium education at preschool (outside the Gaeltacht) and primary and second-levels in the Republic of Ireland.

As part of this reorganisation, for example, Forbairt Naíonraí Teoranta (a voluntary organisation that worked with Irish-medium pre-schools) was merged into Gaelscoileanna Teo. Forbairt Naíonraí Teoranta (FNT) had been founded in 2003, as a successor to An Comhchoiste Réamhscolaíochta, which dated from 1978. FNT provided support in establishing and running naíonraí (pre-schools), naíolanna (crèches), parent/guardian and toddler groups, after-school services and summer camps. It also assisted in the provision of insurance and grants to naíonraí, and ran Irish-language courses for their staff. It was reported, in January 2014, that FNT (which had received 1 million Euro in funding from FnaG in 2011). was one of several organisations that would no longer receive state funding. As part of this "major reorganization of Irish language organizations in 2014", FNT was subsumed into Gaelscoileanna Teo.

In 2016, to "reflect its broader remit", the combined organisation changed its name to Gaeloideachas.

== See also ==
- List of Irish language media
- Irish language in Northern Ireland
- An Chomhairle um Oideachas Gaeltachta & Gaelscolaíochta
- Comhairle na Gaelscolaíochta
