= Coláiste Ailigh =

Coordinates: 54.9632°N 7.7252°W

Location
- Cnoc na Móna, Letterkenny, County Donegal; Ireland

Information
- Type: Secondary school
- Motto: sapientia donum dei (God's gift of wisdom)
- Established: 2000
- Principal: Micheál Ó Giobúin
- Staff: 20
- Enrollment: Around 280
- Language: Irish
- Colours: yellow and blue
- Website: colaisteailigh.ie

Coláiste Ailigh is a Gaelcholáiste (a secondary school offering a curriculum taught through the Irish language) in County Donegal, Ireland. Formerly located at Sprackburn House in Letterkenny, it opened in 2000, becoming the VEC's third All-Irish School. Pupils from the surrounding areas of Carrigart, Termon and Strabane also enrolled in the school.

The Government of Ireland allowed it to build a new school in 2008; this was completed by November 2013. It includes a gym, sport hall, cafeteria and full-sized Gaelic football pitch. Built to hold 35 students, the school currently has about 27 students. Its principal is Micheál Ó Giobúin.

In 2007 the school received a €20 prize for PE equipment at the active School Awards held in The Helix in Dublin. It was one of only two schools in Donegal to avail of the funds, the other being Moville Community College. Awards were presented based on achievements in placing PE, physical activity and sport at the forefront during Active School Week and during the school year. It also takes part in the Young Scientist and Technology Exhibition and has won many prizes.
