= Coláiste na Coiribe =

Location
- Ballyburke Road, Knocknacarra, County Galway; Ireland; 53.26948°N 9.12412°W

Information
- Established: 1992
- Principal: Eoghan Ó Ceallaigh
- Enrollment: c. 590
- Website: www.colaistenacoiribe.ie

Coláiste na Coiribe is a Gaelscoil in Galway, Ireland. The school, which is located in the Knocknacarra area of Galway city, is administered by the Galway and Roscommon Education and Training Board. As of 2020, there were over 590 students enrolled.

== History ==
Coláiste na Coiribe was established in 1992 with six students. It was originally located on Tuam Road in Galway City but relocated to Knocknacarra in October 2015.

== Curriculum ==
The educational programme of the school consists of Junior Certificate, Transition Year, Leaving Certificate and the LCVP. Each student's academic progress is constantly monitored and evaluated. Written reports are sent home four times per academic year.
