= Barna Basilides =

Hungarian painter (born 1903)

- Born: March 2, 1903; Tornaľa, Hungary (today Slovakia)
- Died: February 12, 1967 (aged 64); Budapest, Hungary
- Education: Moholy-Nagy University of Art and Design (1920); Hungarian University of Fine Arts
- Known for: Painting; tapestry
- Awards: XVIII. Biennale of Venice Grand Prize (1932); Capital City Gold Prize Budapest (1942)

Barna Basilides (March 2, 1903 – February 12, 1967) was a Hungarian painter.

== Early life and education ==
Born in Tornaľa, Hungary (today Slovakia), Barna and his brother Sándor both decided to pursue painting, while their other three brothers pursued other artistic disciplines.

He started his studies in graphics in 1920 at the Hungarian College for Applied Arts. In 1921, he was accepted to the Hungarian University of Fine Arts. He finished his studies in 1925. In the following years he went on educational trips to Italy, Paris, Prague and Vienna.

== Career ==
Barna Basilides was known mainly for his landscapes. He died on February 12, 1967, in Budapest.
