= Forbairt Feirste =

Forbairt Feirste is a Belfast-based Irish language development agency that aims to utilise Belfast’s Irish-speaking community to help promote the Irish language; support Irish speakers living in and visiting the city; and support the city in general. The agency was set up in 1994.

It has been successful in working with businesses in Nationalist areas of Belfast to erect Irish language or bilingual signage and are one of the main Irish language organisations who promote the Gaeltacht Quarter in West Belfast.

As of 2018, their director was Jake MacSiacais who had been in the position since 2004.

== See also ==
- Irish language Gaeilge.
- Gael-Taca Similar organisation based in Cork City.
- Gaillimh le Gaeilge Similar organisation based in Galway City.
- Gaeltacht Irish speaking regions in Ireland
- Irish language in Northern Ireland
- Líonraí Gaeilge Irish Language Networks
- List of Irish language media
- Irish language outside Ireland
- List of organisations in Irish Language Movement
