= Gaillimh le Gaeilge =

Galway City-based Irish language organisation

Gaillimh le Gaeilge is a Galway City-based Irish language organisation who work to promote the Irish language in Galway City particularly in the business sector. They were established in 1987. They work with Galway City Council, Galway Chamber and other groups to develop and strengthen Galway City's official status as Ireland's only bilingual city. Their main schemes include ‘Cairde Ghaillimh le Gaeilge’, ‘Gaeilge sa Ghnó’ business service, ‘Irish on Menus’ and ‘Gradam Sheosaimh Uí Ógartaigh’.

== See also ==
- Official Languages Act 2003
- Gaeltacht
- Connacht Irish
- Gaeltacht Act 2012
- 20-Year Strategy for the Irish Language 2010-2030
- Bailte Seirbhíse Gaeltachta
- Gael-Taca
- Forbairt Feirste
- List of Irish language media
