= Frigyes Barna =

Hungarian ice hockey player (1896–1958)

- Born: 27 February 1896; Budapest, Austria-Hungary
- Died: 31 January 1958 (aged 61); Kitzbühel, Austria
- National team: Hungary
- Playing career: 1925–1932

Frigyes Barna (27 February 1896 in Budapest – 31 January 1958 in Kitzbühel) was a Hungarian ice hockey player. He played and represented the Hungarian national team at the 1928 Winter Olympics and at the 1930 and 1931 World Championships.
