= Barna Liebháber =

Hungarian footballer and manager (1946–2024)

Personal information
- Full name: Barna Liebháber
- Date of birth: 19 April 1946
- Place of birth: Budapest, Hungary
- Date of death: 5 January 2024 (aged 77)
- Position: Defender

Youth career
- 1958–1964: Vasas

Senior career*
Years	Team	Apps	(Gls)
1964–1967	Vasas	18	(1)
1968–1969	Alemannia Aachen		
1969–1970	AZ		
1970	Angoulême		
1970–1971	Lierse S.K.		
1972–1973	Admira Wacker		
1973–1974	Linzer ASK		
1975	Utrecht		

International career
1966	Hungary U21	1	(0)

Managerial career
- 1981: SV Lurup
- 1983–1986: Benin
- 1990: Vasas
- 1995: Victoria Hamburg
- * Club domestic league appearances and goals

Barna Liebháber (19 April 1946 – 5 January 2024) was a Hungarian footballer. Sometimes also known as Barna Lázár, he played for Vasas and various clubs across Western Europe, notably playing in the Bundesliga with Alemannia Aachen and the Ligue 1 with Angoulême as a defender. He also briefly represented Hungary U21 on one occasion.

== Career as a footballer ==
Liebháber began his career by playing for the youth sector of Vasas and would be promoted to the senior squad for the 1964 season. He would play in a golden age for the club as he would make the starting XI for the club in the 1965 and 1966 Nemzeti Bajnokság I under club manager Lajos Csordás. He remained until the 1967 season with this season also having him score his first goal at the Népstadion on 16 April 1967 as he would make 18 appearances for the club. He spent the rest of his career with foreign clubs, following other players such as Attila Ladinszky, Gyula Visnyei, and István Kenderesi in a growing trend in Hungarian football by the 1970s. He first played for Alemannia Aachen for their 1968–69 season in where the club would reach the semi-finals of the 1968–69 Bundesliga. Following this success, he went to the Netherlands to play for AZ in their 1969–70 season for the 1969–70 Eredivisie. However, during the middle of the season, he would play for Angoulême for the 1969–70 French Division 1 as the club would end in fourth place by the end of the season. He then played in Belgium for Lierse S.K. for the 1970–71 Belgian First Division in which the club would reach fourth and spend his next two active seasons in Austria with Admira Wacker and Linzer ASK. He spent his last seasons with the first half of the 1975–76 FC Utrecht season before retiring by 1975.

== Career as a manager ==
Liebháber would return to the world of football as a player-manager for SV Lurup in 1981. He then had a far more notable position with Benin from 1983 to 1986. He then returned to Vasas as a field coach in 1990 and had his final managerial position with Victoria Hamburg in 1995.

== Later life ==
He died on January 5, 2024, and his funeral was held on January 15, 2024, at Nagykovácsi.
