= Cima de Barna =

Mountain in Switzerland

- Location within Alps

Highest point
- Elevation: 2,862 m (9,390 ft)
- Prominence: 314 m (1,030 ft)
- Parent peak: Piz Corbet
- Coordinates: 46°25′21.4″N 9°15′44″E

Geography
- Location: Lombardy, Italy/Graubünden, Switzerland
- Parent range: Lepontine Alps

Cima de Barna is a mountain of the Lepontine Alps, located on the Swiss-Italian border. It is situated south of Pass de Balniscio.
