= Gael-Taca =

Irish language promotional organisation

- Formation: 1987; 39 years ago
- Founder: Pádraig Ó Cuanacháin
- Purpose: Promotion of the Irish language
- Region served: County Cork, Ireland

Gael-Taca is an Irish language promotional organisation in County Cork, Ireland. Its primary activities are promoting the Irish language in the business sector and seeking expansion of the number of Irish language immersion schools (Gaelscoileanna) in the city and county of Cork. Having been in receipt of substantial State funding for many years, regular funding ceased in 2020 and as of 2025, operational State funding has not been restored.

== History ==
The group was established in 1987 by Pádraig Ó Cuanacháin who remained the marketing director until he died in 2008.

The organisation had its government funding suspended in 2020 due to claims from the government that it had shortcomings in governance and financial control and a lack of operational capacity to handle funding. Following this, the organisation gave up its business premises in Cork and acquired emergency funding from the state to clear its accumulated debts, but due the lack of funding it operated primarily with volunteer staff. As of January 2025, funding remains suspended.

== Activities ==
Gael-Taca provide a free consultancy service to businesses that want to incorporate the Irish language in their business, including encouraging property developers to choose Irish language names for their new developments, and they answer general Irish language queries from the public in Cork.

In 2008, following the death of Pádraig Ó Cuanacháin, Gael-Taca claimed to have supplied the name of over 400 residential areas with Irish-language names on the island of Ireland to property developers and builders up until that year.

== Gradam Uí Chuanacháin ==
The annual Gradam Uí Chuanacháin award is named after Ó Cuanacháin and is awarded by Gael-Taca to the business that has, in their view, promoted or used the Irish language the best in Cork in the preceding year. The award started again in 2025 after having been suspended since 2020 during the Covid pandemic.

== See also ==
- Gaillimh le Gaeilge Galway city-based Irish language organisation who work with the business sector.
- Forbairt Feirste Belfast-based Irish language organisation who work with the business sector.
- Bailte Seirbhíse Gaeltachta Gaeltacht Service Towns
- Líonraí Gaeilge Irish language networks
- Gaelscoil Irish language-medium primary school - often used to refer to Irish language-medium secondary schools also
