= An Chomhairle um Oideachais Gaeltachta agus Gaelscolaíochta =

Irish state agency supporting Irish-medium education

An Chomhairle um Oideachas Gaeltachta agus Gaelscolaíochta (COGG) is a Republic of Ireland State-agency who serve as a consultative council to the Irish Department of Education and Youth and other organisations and individuals on Irish language-medium education and who also provide support services and teaching resources and carry out research for Irish language-medium schools both inside and outside the Irish-speaking regions or Gaeltacht in the Republic of Ireland. Their name translates into English as The Council for Gaeltacht and Gaelscoileanna Education. The name is usually abbreviated as COGG for short. The Comhairle ("Council") was appointed for the first time in 2002 and has been reappointed on four occasions since then. They are a separate organisation to the Northern Ireland Comhairle na Gaelscolaíochta.

== See also ==
- Gaeltacht Irish-speaking regions in Ireland.
- List of Irish language media
- Irish language in Northern Ireland
