= Barna Woods =

Area of mixed broadleaf woodland in Barna, Ireland

Coordinates: 53°15′39″N 9°8′2″W

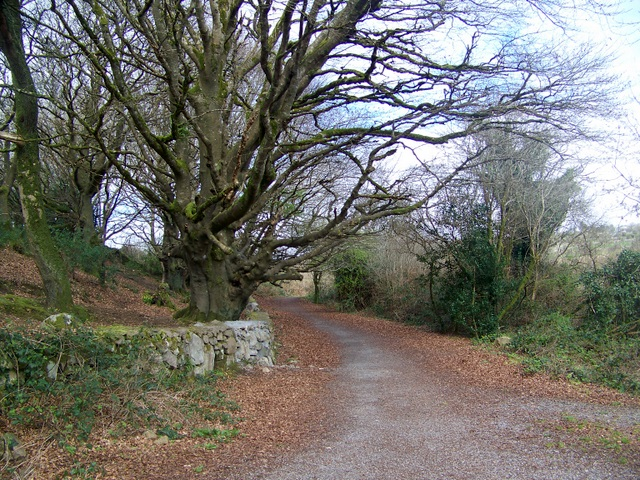
Path in Barna Woods

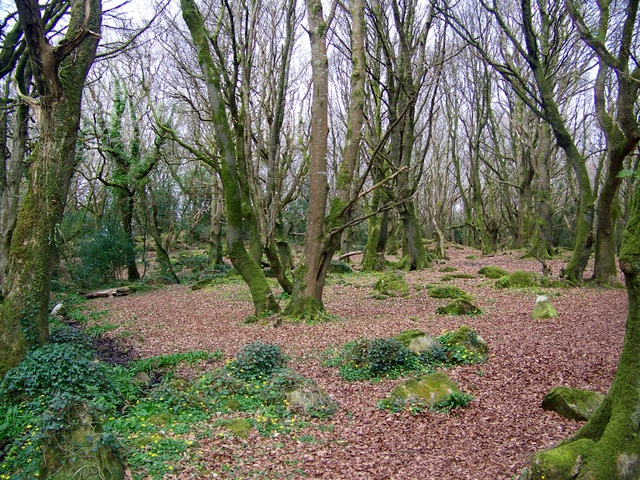
Barna Woods in March 2009

Barna Woods (Irish: Coill Bhearna) is an area of mixed broadleaf woodland located in Barna, County Galway, Ireland. The woods are approximately 3 miles from Galway city centre near Galway Bay. The woods are accessible from Cappagh park which is located in Knocknacara or from Barna Road (Coastal Road - R336) where there is a small carpark. Other sections of the woods include an area across the road known as the South Wood which leads to marshlands ending in the Silver Strand (Irish: Trá na gCeann) on Galway Bay.

== Ecological importance ==
The woods are owned by Galway City Council and are open to the public. They are managed as part of a large Special Area of Conservation, the Galway Bay Complex, which protects a diverse range of marine, coastal and terrestrial habitats.

== Storm Éowyn ==
In January, almost 100 trees fell in Barna Woods due to Storm Éowyn. The woodland remained closed to the public for over four months following the storm due to safety concerns. In response, Galway City Council launched a project to repurpose selected fallen trees into chainsaw-carved sculptures depicting various figures, including an owl, an otter chasing a fish, and a fairy house.

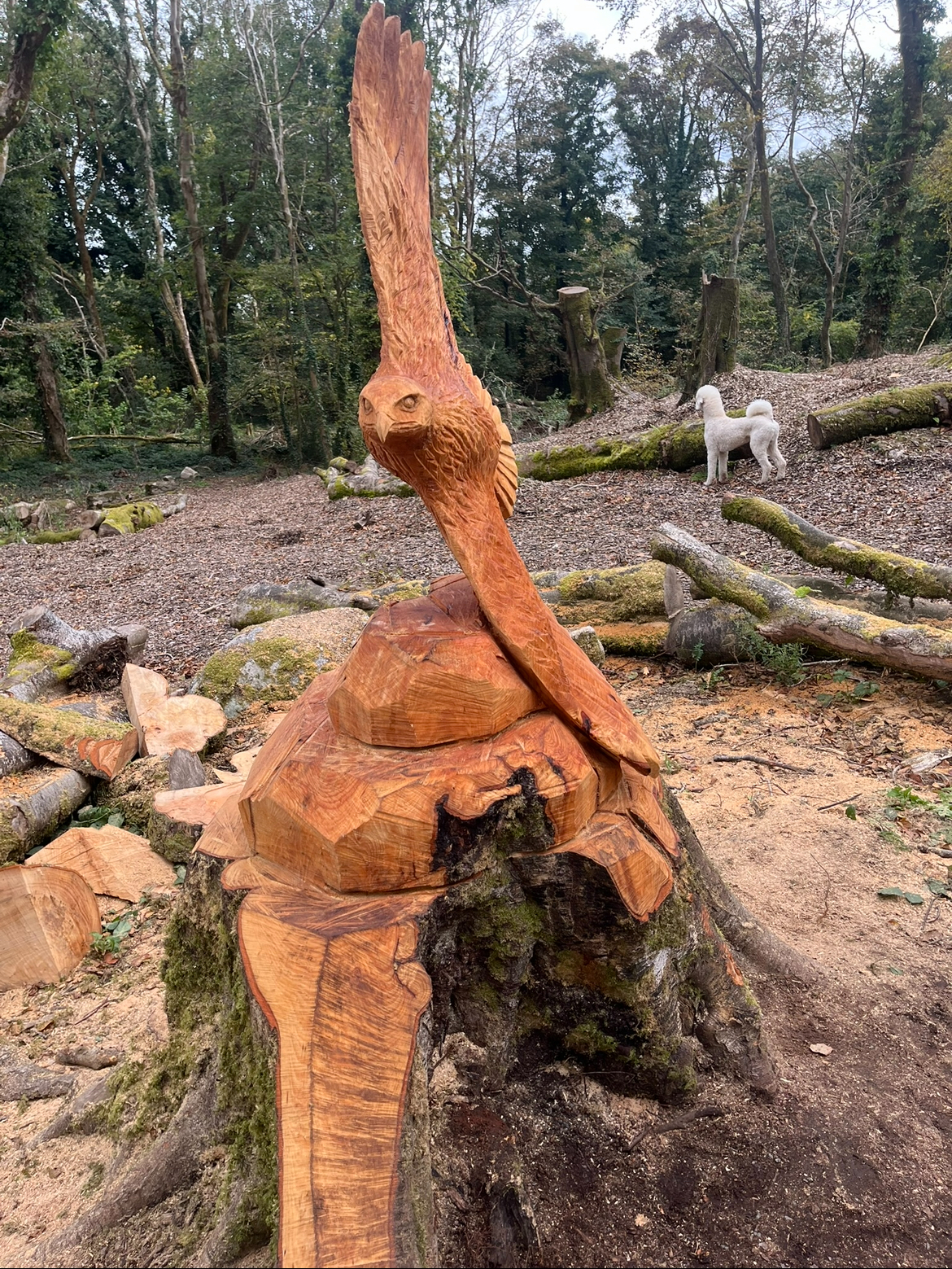
Sculpture of an eagle in Barna Woods

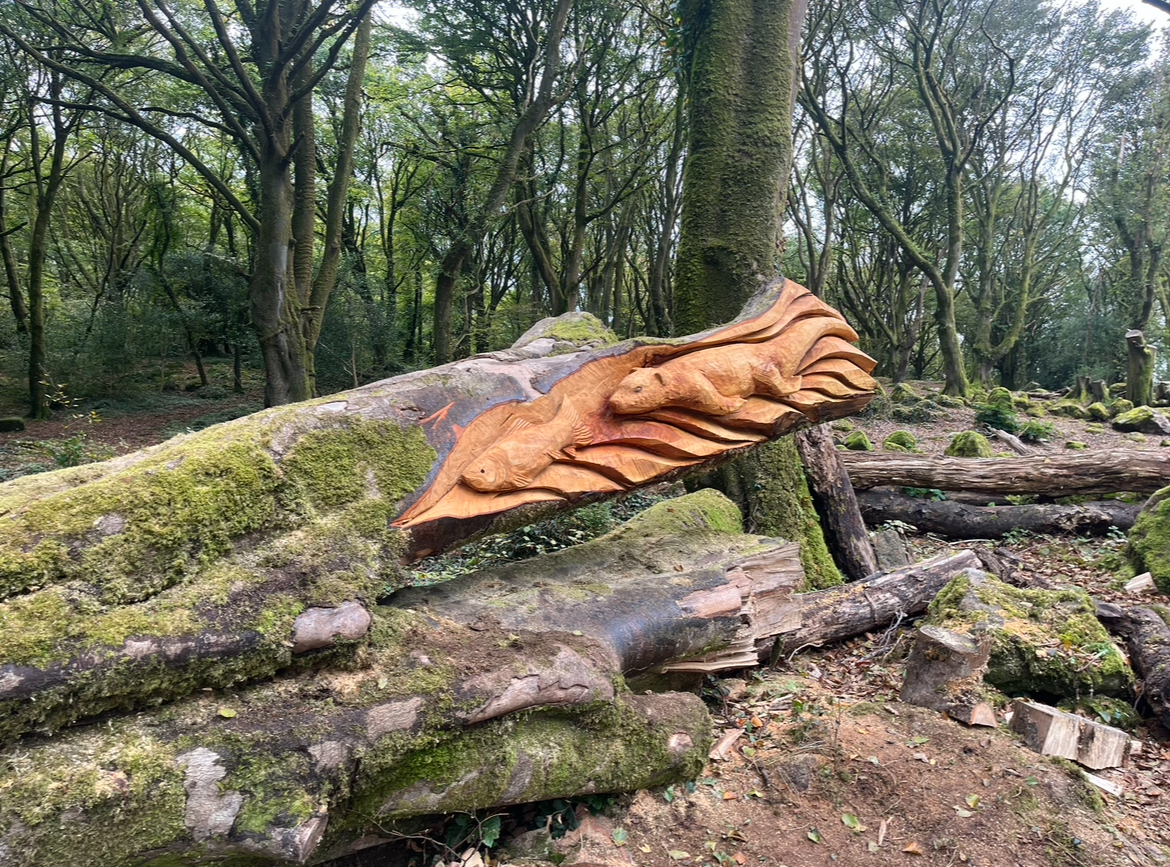
Sculpture of an otter chasing a fish in Barna Woods
