= Naíonra =

Irish medium playgroup for pre-school children

A naíonra (pronounced [ˈn̪ˠiːn̪ˠɾˠə]; plural: naíonraí) is an Irish-medium playgroup for pre-school children, which follows the principle of Total Early Immersion.

== Definitions ==
=== Republic of Ireland ===
In the Republic of Ireland, a Naíonra or Naíscoil is an Irish-medium pre-school in which a Stiúrthóir, or Leader, speaks only Irish while interacting with the children, who are usually aged between 3 and 5 years of age. Naíonraí sessions usually last between 2 and 3.5 hours per day, which a child attends on a daily basis.

The staff of the naíonra seek to encourage the child's development "physically, intellectually, creatively, aesthetically, socially, emotionally and linguistically". Operators of naíonraí believe that the most suitable method of learning for children at this age is through the medium of play.

=== Northern Ireland ===
In Northern Ireland Naíonra specifically refers to Irish language childcare for 2–3 year olds, whereas Naíscoil (infant school) is the term used for the 3 hour sessional care for 3–5 year olds.

== History ==
The first Naíonra opened in 1968. In 1974 a voluntary organisation called Na Naíonraí Gaelacha was established by Conradh na Gaeilge with a view of promoting Irish medium pre-school education throughout Ireland. In 1978 Bord na Gaeilge (now Foras na Gaeilge) was founded by the Irish Government to act as a directly funded body to promote the use of Irish in all facets of life on the Island. That year, Na Naíonraí Gaelacha was absorbed by Bord Na Gaeilge, and renamed An Comhchoiste Réamhscolaíochta and were funded to carry out their mission. They remain active as a networking organisation for all the Irish language preschool providers on the Island. They organise annual events like 'Lá na Naíonra' in May and an annual conference 'Comhdháil na Naíonraí Gaelacha' on the first Saturday of October.

Altram was established in 1990 by childcare providers in Belfast and Derry to oversee the development of the Irish language childcare sector in Northern Ireland and continue to this day. But in the Republic of Ireland a further change in 2003 would see An Comhchoiste Réamhscolaíochta replaced by two separate organisations in order to better focus efforts on Gaeltacht and non-Gaeltacht regions. In 2003, Forbairt Naíonraí Teoranta (FNT) became the successor to An Comhchoiste, (which in turn was succeeded by Gaelscoileanna in 2015) while Comhar Naíonraí na Gaeltachta was established in 2004 by Údarás na Gaeltachta to operate in the Gaeltacht regions.

In a controversial move by Foras na Gaeilge to concentrate the work of 19 Irish language organisations to six, entitled An Samhail Nua Maoinithe, FNT had their funding withdrawn in June 2015 and the overseeing and the development of Gaelic preschool care in Ireland was passed to Gaelscoileanna. On top of this they were also given responsibility for primary and secondary schooling in the Gaeltacht regions. In view of their greater responsibility Gaelscoileanna was rebranded as Gaeloideachais meaning Gaelic education. Responsibilities for the overseeing and development of Irish language early childhood care remained with Comhar Naíonra na Gaeltacht in the Gaeltacht regions and with Altram in Northern Ireland.

These organisations provide advice, training and grant aid to existing naíonraí and those interested in starting their own naíonra.

The Gaeloideachais website, at gaelscoileanna.ie, contains a section dedicated to naíonraí.

== Numbers of naíonraí ==
As of 2017, there were 327 Naíonra / Naíscoileanna in Ireland. Of these:

- Gaeloideachas had 203 naíonra under its stewardship.
- Comhar Naíonra na Gaeltacha had 69 naíonra under its stewardship, with a further 18 other early childcare services including full day care and after school hour services.
- Altram had 49 naíscoil, 6 naíonra, 5 "Sure Start" programs and 1 full day child care under its stewardship.
