= Irish language in Northern Ireland =

The proportion of respondents in the 2011 census aged 3 and above who stated that they can speak Irish

The Irish language (Irish: Gaeilge) is, since 2022, an official language in Northern Ireland. The main dialect spoken there is Ulster Irish (Gaeilge or Gaeilg Uladh). Protection for the Irish language in Northern Ireland stems largely from the European Charter for Regional or Minority Languages.

In the 2021 census, Irish was the main language of 0.3% of the population aged 3 and up, an increase from 0.2% in the previous survey, while 12.4% of that population had some ability in Irish, also an increase from previous census results. As well, for the first time, the census asked the frequency of speaking Irish. 43,557 said they spoke Irish on a daily basis, which accounts for 2.43% of Northern Ireland's population.

== History ==
=== Language in Gaelic Ireland ===
As in other parts of Ireland, Irish was the main language in the region of present-day Northern Ireland for most of its recorded history. The historic influence of the Irish language in Northern Ireland can be seen in many place names, for example the name of Belfast first appears in the year 668, and the Lagan even earlier ("Logia", Ptolemy's Geography 2,2,8). The Plantation of Ulster led to a decline in Gaelic culture through forcible expulsions of native Irish in favour of English and Scottish colonists. The Irish language, of course, was part of this culture – and while some Scottish settlers were Scots-Gaelic speakers, English was made widespread by the plantation. Despite the plantation Irish continued to be spoken in non-planted areas until the mass immigration in the 19th century caused by economic factors.

=== Irish Revival in Northern Ireland ===
Intellectuals in Belfast took an antiquarian interest in Irish-language culture towards the end of the 18th century, and an Irish-language magazine Bolg an tSolair was published in 1795. The Ulster Gaelic Society was founded in 1830. Attitudes among the Anglican and Presbyterian middle class, however, changed in the second half of the 19th century as the Gaelic Revival began being associated with support for Home Rule or Irish Republicanism. The English-born MP for South Londonderry, Thomas Lea proposed an amendment to the draft of the second Home Rule Bill that would have prevented the passing of laws which would increase Irish language use in state schools, legal courts and other public spheres. A branch of the Gaelic League was founded in Belfast in 1895 with a non-sectarian and widely based membership, but the decline in Irish as a first language continued.

Irish was in sharp decline throughout the whole of Ireland from the mid-1800s. From the late 1600s and early 1700s, the Church of Ireland made some attempts to revive the declining Irish language. The church printed Bibles and Prayer Books in Irish, and some churches, and some Protestant clergymen like William King of Dublin, held services in the language. However, the English language had been the language of learning and the Roman Catholic Church continued to use Ecclesiastical Latin for Mass and English in sermons. English was the language of the industrial east of the island, and Irish started to become confined to the more rural west. The proportion of Irish speakers had fallen from about half of the population in 1800 to 23% by 1851, and with only about a third of these speaking it exclusively.

By the 1860s, of all the Roman Catholic seminaries, only St Jarlath's in Tuam was teaching in Irish. The Roman Catholic Church had, at that time, desired to "stamp out any lingering, semi-pagan remnants", which included the Irish language. Some, like Sir William Wilde in 1852, blamed the Catholic Church for the quick decline and was "shocked" by the rapid decline of both the language and Gaelic customs after the Famine.

The power of the English language, in business and learning throughout much of the world also influenced the decline of Irish in Ireland. A letter from Dennis Heraghty of Letterkenny in 1886 to the Society for the Preservation of the Irish Language complained that the parents in his area all wanted their children to learn English. Bishop MacCormac of Achonry, also in 1886, suggested that "People are apathetic about the preservation of our ancient language" and, "They see that Shakespeare's tongue is the one in use in America and the Colonies."

Although there had been attempts and societies formed to reverse the declining trend for the language, it was not until the rise of the Gaelic League, founded in 1893, that any measure of success was achieved.

Douglas Hyde, in New York in 1905, said, "The Irish language, thank God, is neither Protestant nor Catholic, it is neither a Unionist nor a Separatist." By then, however, the Gaelic League was already being covertly infiltrated and politicised by operatives working for Thomas Clarke and the Irish Republican Brotherhood.

At the same time, however, the Catholic Church in Ireland also began to believe in the worth of the language and had begun to take steps to ensure its survival.

Protestants and Unionists alike began to back away from the Gaelic revival as, besides the dominant role of the Roman Catholic Church by then, Irish people were starting to be described as a "race". James Alexander Rentoul, MP for Down East, stated at Westminster in July 1900 that the Irish language had no value and should not receive any support by the public education system. He also stated that Irish-speaking children should continue being subjected to coercive Anglicization in the schools so that the Irish language would soon become extinct. Even so, in 1905 the Irish Unionist Party had an Irish slogan, which it proudly displayed at a convention.

The British civil service officials of the Intermediate Board, the organisation through which public education policy was implemented, attempted to frustrate the improvement of Irish-medium education provision so severely that the sitting Lord Lieutenant of Ireland, John Hamilton-Gordon, had to write to the Board on 25 July 1906 to demand that the provision be implemented. In response, John Lonsdale, MP for Mid Armagh and member of the Ulster Unionist Council, claimed that the Gaelic movement which supported the Irish language was simply inspired by Irish republicanism and hatred of all things English. He opposed any teaching of Irish in primary schools as "money wasted" and "useless" as well as claiming that Irish was a vehicle for the dissemination of "seditious views."

=== Since the partition of Ireland ===
Following the partition of Ireland into the Irish Free State and Northern Ireland (which remained part of the United Kingdom), the largest Irish-speaking area in the province of Ulster; County Donegal; had gone into the Irish Free State. However, there were Gaeltacht areas (communities who continued to speak Irish as their first language) in Northern Ireland at the time; the most prominent of these were the Sperrin Mountains in County Tyrone and County Londonderry, Rathlin Island and the Glens of Antrim in County Antrim, Aghyaran in County Tyrone, parts of south Armagh and Cashel in south-west County Fermanagh. Since 1921, the Irish language has been regarded with suspicion by many unionists in Northern Ireland, who have associated it with the Republic of Ireland and with Irish republicanism.

The Irish-language movement in Northern Ireland after 1921 responded to a lack of establishment support by pursuing a self-help social and recreational movement aimed at preserving Ulster Irish (an issue which had split the Belfast Gaelic League in 1911). By 1923, only one branch of the Gaelic League was left in operation in Northern Ireland, but from a handful of branches in 1926 the number of branches peaked at 182 in 1946. In contrast to the perception of the Irish Free State's policy of preserving areas of Irish-speaking countryside, activists in Northern Ireland concentrated on ensuring Irish could survive in urban contexts, organising trips to Irish-speaking areas to bolster urban enthusiasm.

From the early years of the Northern Ireland government, education in Irish was marginalised. The number of primary schools teaching Irish was halved between 1924 and 1927, and numbers studying Irish as an extra subject fell from 5531 to 1290 between 1923 and 1926. The subsidy for Irish as an extra subject was abolished in 1934.

The last speakers of varieties of Irish native to what is now Northern Ireland died in the 20th century. Irish as spoken in Counties Down and Fermanagh were the first to die out, but native speakers of varieties spoken in the Glens of Antrim and the Sperrin Mountains of County Tyrone and County Londonderry survived into the 1950s and 1970s respectively, whilst the Armagh dialect survived until the 1930s or '40s. Varieties of Irish indigenous to the territory of Northern Ireland finally became extinct when the last native speaker of Rathlin Irish died in 1985. Séamus Bhriain Mac Amhlaigh, who died in 1983, was reportedly the last native-speaker of Antrim Irish. A wealth of recordings and stories told by Mac Amhlaigh, however, were recorded before his death by researchers from Queen's University in Belfast.

At the same time, The Troubles exacerbated the politicisation of the Irish language in Northern Ireland. Many republicans in Northern Ireland, including former Sinn Féin President Gerry Adams, learned Irish while in prison. Furthermore, co-operative housing scheme in West Belfast aimed at creating an urban neo-Gaeltacht opened in 1969 in Shaw's Road.

According to Innti poet and scholar of Modern literature in Irish Louis de Paor, this resulted in Belfast Irish, "a new urban dialect", of Ulster Irish, that was "forged in the heat of Belfast during The Troubles" and which is now the main dialect spoken in the Gaeltacht Quarter.

To lend support for this effort during the early 1980s, Dublin-based Connaught Irish Modernist poet Máirtín Ó Direáin chose to risk both crossing what was still a "hard border" and the danger of falling victim to the ongoing paramilitary violence by Ulster Loyalists during The Troubles. Ó Direáin travelled to Northern Ireland and gave a poetry reading at the Cumann Chluain Ard, an urban language revival club in the Gaeltacht Quarter of West Belfast.

The Belfast Irish dialect, according to Louis de Paor, has even developed a "street slang", which been used in the poetry of Gearóid Mac Lochlainn and other radically innovative writers of Modern literature in Irish like him. The hip hop music trio Kneecap is also based in the Gaeltacht Quarter and performs rap music in the West Belfast urban dialect of Ulster Irish.

Simultaneously, Linda Ervine and the Turas organisation based in East Belfast continues to seek, with considerable success, to promote the Irish language revival among Ulster Protestants.

== Status ==
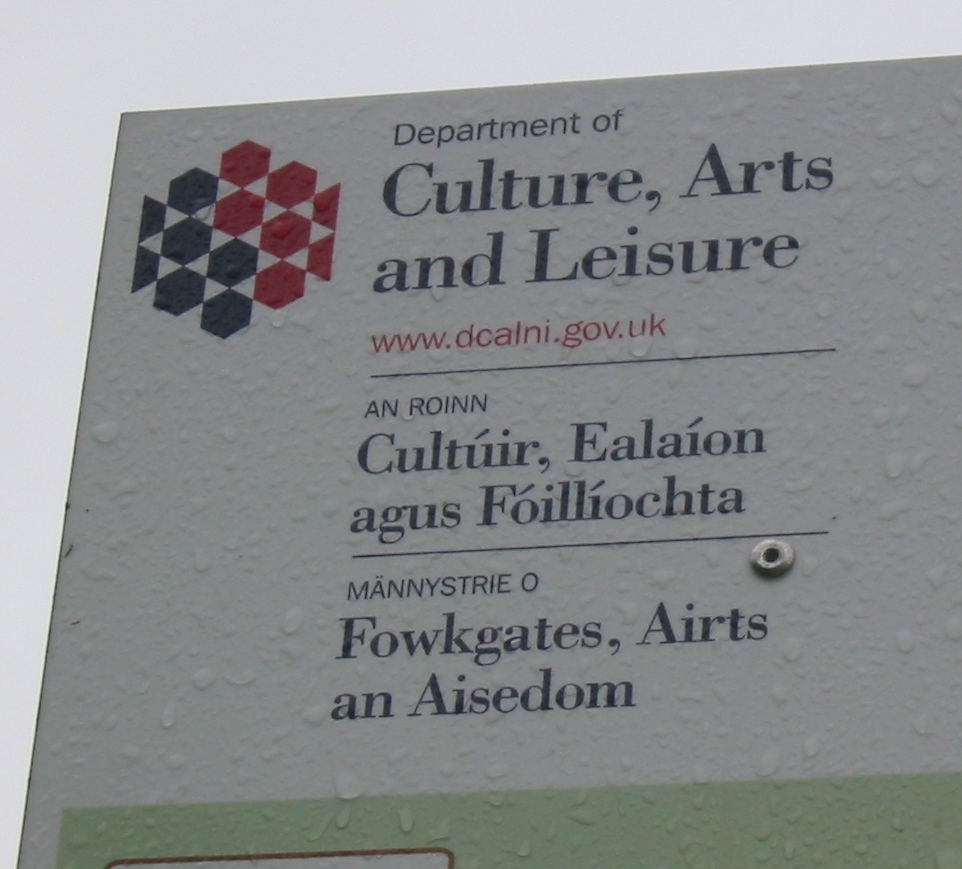
Official administrative identity in English, Irish and Ulster Scots

Most Irish speakers in Ulster today speak the Donegal dialect of Ulster Irish.

Irish received official recognition in Northern Ireland for the first time in 1998 under the Good Friday Agreement, and status as an official language in 2022. A cross-border body known as Foras na Gaeilge was established to promote the language in both Northern Ireland and the Republic, taking over the functions of Bord na Gaeilge.

The British government in 2001 ratified the European Charter for Regional or Minority Languages. Irish (in respect only of Northern Ireland) was specified under Part III of the Charter, thus giving it a degree of protection and status comparable to the Scottish Gaelic in Scotland. This included a range of specific undertakings in relation to education, translation of statutes, interaction with public authorities, the use of placenames, media access, support for cultural activities and other matters (a lower level of recognition was accorded to the Ulster variety of Scots, under Part II of the Charter). Compliance with State obligations is assessed periodically by a Committee of Experts of the Council of Europe.

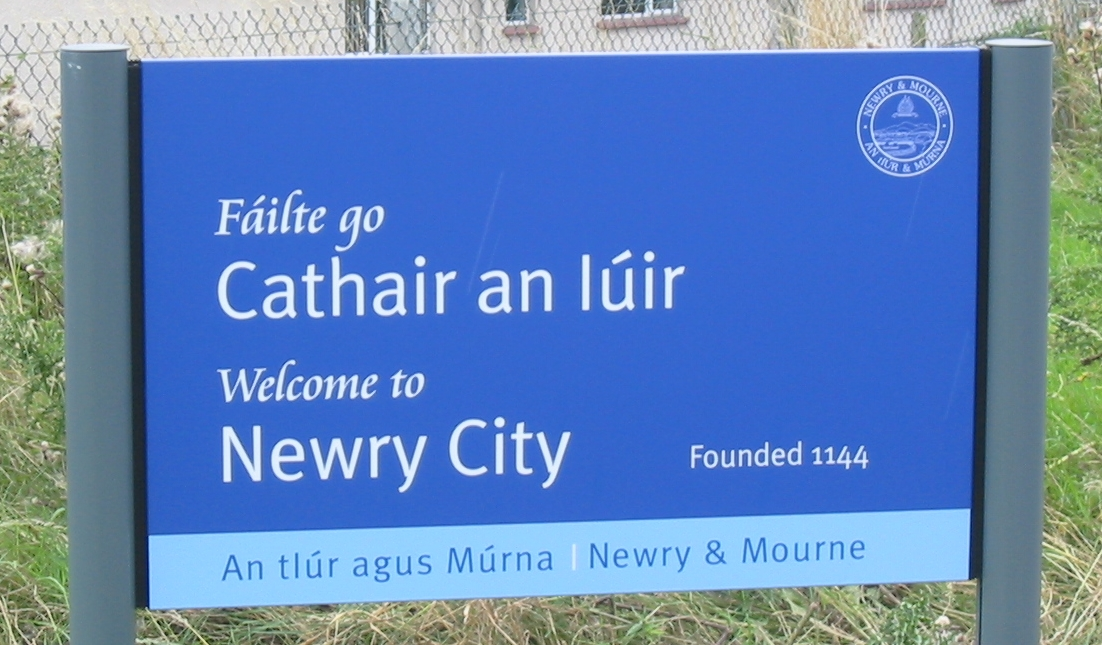
Bilingual welcome sign Newry

The Education (Northern Ireland) Order 1998 states: "It shall be the duty of the Department (of Education) to encourage and facilitate the development of Irish-medium education."

A question about the Irish language was asked until the 1911 census of Ireland, but after partition was not included in the Northern Ireland census until it was reintroduced in 1991, at the 1911 census, the six counties which would become Northern Ireland had 28,734 Irish speakers. According to the 1991 Census, 142,003 people (9.45% of the population) had some language skills ability in Irish.

Knowledge of Irish by people over the age of 3 (percentage of population over the age of 3) for each census since 1991
Census	Speaks, reads, writes and understands Irish	Speaks and reads but does not write Irish	Speaks but does not read or write Irish	Understands spoken Irish but cannot read, write or speak Irish	Has other combination of skills	Has some ability	No knowledge of Irish
1991	79,012 (5.26%)	6,593 (0.44%)	45,338 (3.02%)	N/A	11,060 (0.74%)	142,003 (9.45%)	1,320,657 (87.90%)
2001	75,125 (4.64%)	7,183 (0.44%)	24,536 (1.52%)	36,479 (2.25%)	24,167 (1.49%)	167,490 (10.35%)	1,450,467 (89.65%)
2011	64,847 (3.74%)	7,414 (0.43%)	24,677 (1.42%)	70,501 (4.06%)	17,459 (1.01%)	184,898 (10.65%)	1,550,813 (89.35%)
2021	71,872 (3.91%)	9,683 (0.53%)	37,497 (2.04%)	90,801 (4.94%)	18,764 (1.02%)	228,617 (12.45%)	1,607,995 (87.55%)

Note: The 1991 Census did not ask respondents if they understood Irish but could not read, write or speak it; this was only asked in subsequent censuses.

Detailed 2021 Census Results by County, Local District and Parliamentary Constituency
United Kingdom Census 2021	Total Population	Has Some Knowledge of Irish		Can Speak, Read, Write and Understand Spoken Irish		Speaks Irish Every Day		Main Home Language: Irish	
United Kingdom Census 2021	Total Population	Total	Percentage	Total	Percentage	Total	Percentage	Total	Percentage
Northern Ireland	1,905,175	228,620	12.00%	71,871	3.77%	43,557	2.29%	5,970	0.31%
By County
Antrim	651,321	71,689	11.01%	23,732	3.64%	16,585	2.55%	3,011	0.46%
Armagh	194,393	31,664	16.29%	9,803	5.04%	5,743	2.95%	564	0.29%
Down	553,262	44,506	8.04%	12,978	2.35%	6,358	1.15%	723	0.13%
Fermanagh	65,585	9,591	14.62%	2,703	4.12%	1,216	1.85%	138	0.21%
Londonderry	252,231	36,424	14.44%	11,653	4.62%	6,833	2.71%	827	0.33%
Tyrone	188,383	34,746	18.44%	11,002	5.84%	6,822	3.62%	707	0.38%
By Local Government District (since 2014)
Antrim and Newtownabbey	145,661	11,077	7.60%	3,433	2.36%	2,058	1.41%	245	0.17%
Ards and North Down	163,660	5,116	3.13%	1,231	0.75%	519	0.32%	36	0.02%
Armagh City, Banbridge and Craigavon	218,656	25,644	11.73%	7,882	3.60%	4,595	2.10%	429	0.20%
Belfast	345,417	51,583	14.93%	17,986	5.21%	13,110	3.80%	2,659	0.77%
Causeway Coast and Glens	141,743	13,698	9.66%	4,187	2.95%	2,284	1.61%	231	0.16%
Derry City and Strabane	150,756	23,172	15.37%	7,474	4.96%	4,133	2.74%	510	0.34%
Fermanagh and Omagh	116,812	20,066	17.18%	5,837	5.00%	3,166	2.71%	347	0.30%
Lisburn and Castlereagh	149,106	9,949	6.67%	3,062	2.05%	1,692	1.13%	231	0.15%
Mid and East Antrim	138,994	6,276	4.52%	1,616	1.16%	788	0.57%	46	0.03%
Mid Ulster	150,291	29,397	19.56%	9,544	6.35%	6,179	4.11%	682	0.45%
Newry, Mourne and Down	182,074	32,639	17.93%	9,620	5.28%	5,033	2.76%	553	0.30%
By Local Government District (1993-2013)
Antrim	57,178	5,606	9.80%	1,756	3.07%	995	1.74%	103	0.18%
Ards	81,911	2,314	2.83%	524	0.64%	222	0.27%	16	0.02%
Armagh	64,960	10,158	15.64%	3,207	4.94%	1,939	2.98%	210	0.32%
Ballymena	67,392	4,040	5.99%	1,058	1.57%	551	0.82%	35	0.05%
Ballymoney	31,631	2,449	7.74%	673	2.13%	288	0.91%	37	0.12%
Banbridge	51,447	4,095	7.96%	1,173	2.28%	596	1.16%	69	0.13%
Belfast	293,297	43,798	14.93%	15,294	5.21%	10,963	3.74%	2,192	0.75%
Carrickfergus	39,653	814	2.05%	200	0.50%	72	0.18%	4	0.01%
Castlereagh	70,092	4,950	7.06%	1,527	2.18%	695	0.99%	67	0.10%
Coleraine	58,878	4,217	7.16%	1,258	2.14%	588	1.00%	50	0.08%
Cookstown	39,611	6,786	17.13%	1,957	4.94%	1,224	3.09%	130	0.33%
Craigavon	104,278	13,452	12.90%	3,648	3.50%	2,168	2.08%	173	0.17%
Derry	110,439	17,323	15.69%	5,653	5.12%	3,131	2.84%	412	0.37%
Down	73,134	9,147	12.51%	2,676	3.66%	1,551	2.12%	171	0.23%
Dungannon	64,441	13,056	20.26%	4,469	6.94%	2,869	4.45%	296	0.46%
Fermanagh	64,140	9,657	15.06%	2,719	4.24%	1,224	1.91%	139	0.22%
Larne	31,949	1,422	4.45%	358	1.12%	165	0.52%	9	0.03%
Limavady	34,050	4,219	12.39%	1,317	3.87%	832	2.44%	85	0.25%
Lisburn	130,811	12,773	9.76%	4,225	3.23%	3,139	2.40%	631	0.48%
Magherafelt	47,301	9,712	20.53%	3,172	6.71%	2,110	4.46%	256	0.54%
Moyle	17,188	2,819	16.40%	939	5.46%	579	3.37%	60	0.35%
Newry & Mourne	105,839	22,901	21.64%	6,744	6.37%	3,350	3.17%	359	0.34%
Newtownabbey	88,485	5,473	6.19%	1,677	1.90%	1,062	1.20%	145	0.16%
North Down	82,076	2,808	3.42%	708	0.86%	301	0.37%	20	0.02%
Omagh	52,647	10,411	19.78%	3,118	5.92%	1,942	3.69%	208	0.40%
Strabane	40,318	5,849	14.51%	1,821	4.52%	1,002	2.49%	98	0.24%
By Parliamentary Constituency (2008-2023)
Belfast East	96,322	4,089	4.25%	1,172	1.22%	675	0.70%	125	0.13%
Belfast North	109,508	14,108	12.88%	5,414	4.94%	3,220	2.94%	507	0.46%
Belfast South	114,002	17,492	15.34%	6,046	5.30%	2,818	2.47%	387	0.34%
Belfast West	93,627	22,143	23.65%	8,084	8.63%	7,461	7.97%	1,755	1.87%
East Antrim	89,492	3,935	4.40%	1,029	1.15%	440	0.49%	40	0.04%
East Londonderry	99,714	9,416	9.44%	2,867	2.88%	1,554	1.56%	156	0.16%
Fermanagh & South Tyrone	109,208	17,081	15.64%	5,147	4.71%	2,688	2.46%	275	0.25%
Foyle	103,652	16,342	15.77%	5,361	5.17%	2,998	2.89%	390	0.38%
Lagan Valley	112,708	5,644	5.01%	1,602	1.42%	882	0.78%	127	0.11%
Mid Ulster	106,285	22,130	20.82%	7,170	6.75%	4,739	4.46%	547	0.51%
Newry & Armagh	123,054	23,641	19.21%	7,276	5.91%	4,128	3.35%	451	0.37%
North Antrim	112,262	8,286	7.38%	2,387	2.13%	1,276	1.14%	111	0.10%
North Down	93,172	3,012	3.23%	746	0.80%	318	0.34%	21	0.02%
South Antrim	106,390	8,827	8.30%	2,868	2.70%	1,799	1.69%	237	0.22%
South Down	114,285	18,867	16.51%	5,438	4.76%	2,803	2.45%	316	0.28%
Strangford	93,668	3,365	3.59%	847	0.90%	355	0.38%	27	0.03%
Upper Bann	129,520	13,985	10.80%	4,274	3.30%	2,460	1.90%	195	0.15%
West Tyrone	92,990	16,259	17.48%	4,939	5.31%	2,944	3.17%	306	0.33%
By Parliamentary Constituency (Since 2024)
Belfast East	102,279	5,048	4.94%	1,494	1.46%	818	0.80%	140	0.14%
Belfast North	106,490	14,417	13.54%	4,725	4.44%	3,322	3.12%	529	0.50%
Belfast South and Mid Down	119,550	17,258	14.44%	5,959	4.98%	2,772	2.32%	390	0.33%
Belfast West	103,180	22,741	22.04%	8,273	8.02%	7,606	7.37%	1,790	1.73%
East Antrim	96,954	4,291	4.43%	1,156	1.19%	486	0.50%	40	0.04%
East Londonderry	103,287	9,752	9.44%	2,967	2.87%	1,584	1.53%	159	0.15%
Fermanagh & South Tyrone	111,790	16,798	15.03%	5,597	5.01%	3,002	2.69%	317	0.28%
Foyle	97,305	15,700	16.13%	5,176	5.32%	2,938	3.02%	387	0.40%
Lagan Valley	112,010	5,827	5.20%	1,679	1.50%	871	0.78%	96	0.09%
Mid Ulster	105,229	21,278	20.22%	6,935	6.59%	4,577	4.35%	512	0.49%
Newry & Armagh	111,747	21,597	19.33%	6,619	5.92%	3,766	3.37%	411	0.37%
North Antrim	103,831	7,919	7.63%	2,255	2.17%	1,230	1.18%	111	0.11%
North Down	97,900	3,137	3.20%	777	0.79%	330	0.34%	21	0.02%
South Antrim	106,441	8,513	8.00%	2,744	2.58%	1,685	1.58%	213	0.20%
South Down	105,240	17,632	16.75%	5,170	4.91%	2,640	2.51%	296	0.28%
Strangford	98,154	4,443	4.53%	1,099	1.12%	512	0.52%	41	0.04%
Upper Bann	122,038	13,153	10.78%	3,962	3.25%	2,320	1.90%	184	0.15%
West Tyrone	99,752	17,501	17.54%	5,284	5.30%	3,100	3.11%	339	0.34%

The ULTACH Trust (Iontaobhas ULTACH) was established in 1989 by Irish language enthusiasts to attract funding from the British Government for language projects and to broaden the appeal of the language on a cross-community basis (among both Protestants and Catholics)

The Shaw's Road Gaeltacht was joined in 2002 by the Gaeltacht Quarter in west Belfast.

=== Wards with highest percentage of Irish speakers and users ===
Top 10 wards by highest percentage of some ability in Irish (2021)
Ward	Percentage having some ability in Irish
Termon	43.00%
Washing Bay	39.35%
Swatragh	36.53%
Falls Park	34.73%
Andersontown	34.22%
Lower Glenshane	33.11%
Mullaghbane	32.46%
Shaw's Road	32.17%
Crossmaglen	31.70%
Stewartstown	31.59%

Top 10 wards reporting highest daily usage of Irish (2021)
Ward	Percentage who use Irish on a daily basis
Andersontown	12.41%
Falls Park	12.25%
Shaw's Road	12.18%
Termon	11.84%
Turf Lodge	11.79%
Colin Glen	11.28%
Washing Bay	10.91%
Stewartstown	10.68%
Ballymurphy	10.67%
Swatragh	10.24%

=== Citizenship services ===
The lack of provision for legal and citizenship services in the Irish language, including for the Life in the United Kingdom test, has been met with criticism from the Committee of Experts of the European Charter for Regional or Minority Languages, of which the UK has ratified for the Cornish language, the Irish language, Manx Gaelic, the Scots & Ulster Scots dialects, Scottish Gaelic and the Welsh language. In a 2014 report detailing the application of the charter in the UK, the committee were given no justification for the inequality in the treatment of Irish speakers in contrast to that of English, Scottish Gaelic and Welsh speakers, and that efforts to rectify the inequality were non-existent.

== Education ==
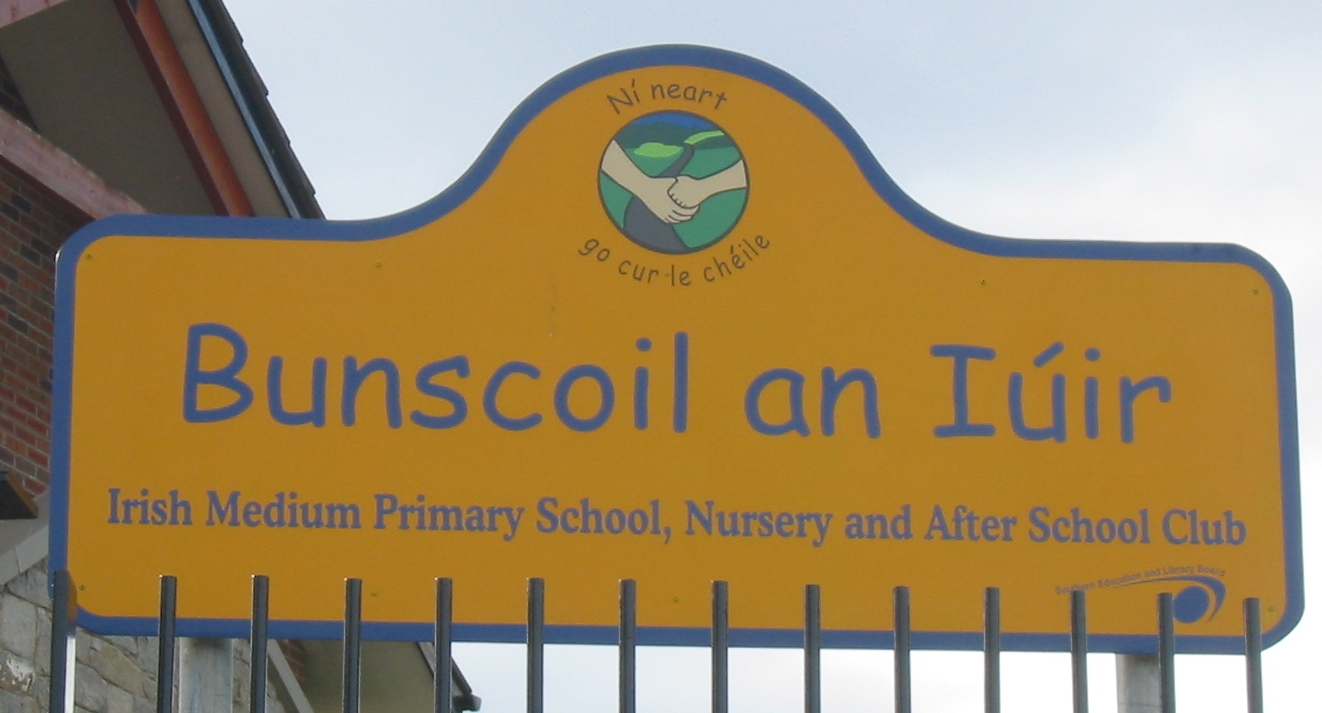
Sign of an Irish medium school in Newry

Six families in Belfast established a Gaeltacht area in Belfast in the late 1960s and opened Bunscoil Phobal Feirste in 1970 as the first Irish-medium school in Northern Ireland, and in 1984 was granted the status of a voluntary maintained primary school. The first Naíscoil (Irish-medium nursery school) opened in 1978. Shortly after the opening of Bunscoil Phobal Feirste, a second all-Irish primary school opened named Gaelscoil na bhFál, situated on the Falls Road. Founded by the parents of children that wanted Irish education but couldn't find a space in 'BPF'. One of the parents, named Sue Pentel, played a major role in the founding of the school. About two years after the opening of Gaelscoil na bhFál. A daycare service named Ionad Uíbh Eachach, was opened, founded, and managed by Sue Pentel. The school and daycare both provide services through the Irish language and work together in a way where many of the children that attended Ionad Uíbh Eachach go on to attend nursery- Primary 7 (Naí ionad- R7) in Gaelscoil na bhFál. This connection is rare in the Irish-first school ecosystem. Plus Ionad provides after-school care.

Comhairle na Gaelscolaíochta (CnaG) is the representative body for Irish-medium Education. It was set up in 2000 by the Department of Education to promote, facilitate and encourage Irish-medium Education. One of CnaG's central objectives is to seek to extend the availability of Irish-medium Education to parents who wish to avail of it for their children. Irish language pre-schools and primary schools are now thriving and there are official Irish language streams in secondary schools in Maghera, Donaghmore, Castlewellan and Armagh.

In December 2014 Minister for Education for Northern Ireland John O'Dowd announced that the Department of Education were going to set up Northern Ireland's second gaelcholáiste in Dungiven Castle in County Londonderry. Gaelcholáiste Dhoire opened in September 2015.

In the academic year 2018/19, over 6,000 children are enrolled in Irish-medium education:

- 43 nurseries (Naíscoileanna) with over 1,000 pupils
- 35 primary schools (Bunscoileanna) with over 3,000 pupils
- 2 second level gaelscoileanna (Gaelcholáiste) with over 800 pupils
- 3 Irish language streams (Sruith Lán-Ghaeilge)

The British Council administers a scheme to recruit Irish language assistants for English-medium schools in Northern Ireland.

In 2013, there were 309 entries for A-Level examinations in Irish and 2,078 for GCSE.

== Media ==
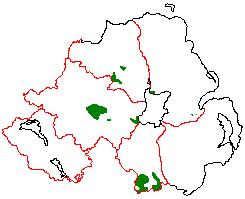
Areas in Northern Ireland in which more than one third of the local population can speak Irish, according to the 2001 Census.

BBC Radio Ulster began broadcasting a nightly half-hour programme, called Blas ('taste'), in Irish in the early 1980s, and there is now an Irish-language programme on the station every day. BBC Northern Ireland broadcast its first television programme in Irish in the early 1990s, SRL ('etc.'). In March 2005, TG4 began broadcasting from the Divis transmitter near Belfast, as a result of agreement between the Department of Foreign Affairs and the Northern Ireland Office. Following Digital Switchover for terrestrial television transmissions in both parts of Ireland in 2012, TG4 is now carried on Freeview HD for viewers in Northern Ireland (channel 51) as well as to those households in Border areas that have spillover reception of the ROI Saorview platform (channel 104). TG4 also continues to be available on other TV delivery platforms across Northern Ireland: Sky (channel 163) and Virgin Cable customers in Belfast (channel 877).

RTÉ's Irish-language radio station, RTÉ Raidió na Gaeltachta based in the Republic of Ireland is also available in many areas in Northern Ireland. Raidió Fáilte a community radio station based in West Belfast covers the Greater Belfast area and started broadcasting in 2006 and broadcasts 24 hours per day seven days per week. It broadcasts a selection of programmes; music, chat, news, current affairs, sports, arts, literature, environmental and community issues. It is also available worldwide on the internet at RaidióFáilte.com.

Residents of Northern Ireland have access to web based media in Irish such as online newspaper Tuairisc.ie or online lifestyle magazine Nós. An Irish-language daily newspaper called Lá Nua ("new day") folded in 2008 due to lack of funding.

The Northern Ireland Film and Television Commission administers an Irish Language Broadcast Fund (announced by the Secretary of State for Northern Ireland in April 2004) to foster and develop an independent Irish-language television production sector in Northern Ireland. The European Commission authorised public funding for the fund in June 2005 considering that "since the aid aims to promote cultural products and the Irish Language, it can be authorised under EU Treaty rules that allow state aids for the promotion of culture".

== Political aspects ==
The Irish language in Northern Ireland has long been associated with identity. Prior to the turn of the 20th century, the Irish language was embraced by both sides of the community, although in decline. But the partition of Ireland in 1921 was a turning point in attitudes towards the language. The Irish language became a significant marker of identity they now needed as a minority group.

During The Troubles, the Irish language revival became increasingly politicised. Its survival is sometimes described as largely due to families in the nationalist Shaw's Road neighborhood of west Belfast, who during the 1960s decided to make the area a neo-Gaeltacht (a new Irish speaking area outside the traditional Gaeltachtaí). The result was a neighborhood now known as the Gaeltacht Quarter, which has become a centre for Modern literature in Irish. The hip hop music trio Kneecap is also based in the Gaeltacht Quarter and performs rap music in the West Belfast urban dialect of Ulster Irish.

A second wave of the Irish language revival movement in Northern Ireland during the 1970s occurred in another locale – the Maze Prison. For republican prisoners, learning the Irish language in prison (aka 'Jailtacht') became a way in which to set themselves apart vis-à-vis the British authorities. More broadly, this use of the Irish language inspired many nationalists in Northern Ireland to use the language as a form of cultural expression and resistance to British rule. In particular, the Irish language has been used extensively by the Irish Republican legitimist Sinn Féin political party, which has been accused by unionists of exploiting the Irish language revival for political gain.

The favouring of the Irish language by "physical force republicans" has therefore led to it receiving mixed responses from unionist communities and politicians. In many unionist communities, the Irish language is regarded as a foreign language or the language of terrorists and therefore – unlike Catholic communities – in Protestant communities its inclusion in school curriculum and public notices continues to be strongly opposed. On the other hand, some moderate nationalists have been reluctant to use Irish too due to the paramilitary connotations associated with the language revival. Issues around the use of the Irish language were intensified when a unionist MLA was accused of mocking Irish in the Northern Irish Assembly. In November 2014, in response to a question about minority language policy the DUP's Gregory Campbell said "Curry my yoghurt can coca coalyer" in what was meant to sound like "Thank you, speaker" in Irish which he later claimed was in an attempt to make a point about the continued political use of the language by some Sinn Féin MLAs in post 1998 Good Friday Agreement.

In recent years, cross-community efforts have attempted to make the Irish language more appealing to both sides of the community. Many local councils now use Irish bilingually with English (sometimes with Ulster Scots too) on many of its services in an attempt to neutralise the language. Some former loyalist prisoners such as Robin Stewart have even taken up learning the Irish language in east Belfast in an attempt to reclaim Irish identity and challenge Republicans about their version of Irish history and what it means to be Irish. The former Red Hand Commando prisoner William Smith learnt the language whilst in jail. The motto of the Red Hand Commando was the Irish phrase Lámh Dearg Abú which translated means 'Red Hand to Victory'. Linda Ervine, the sister-in-law of former Ulster Volunteer Force paramilitary and politician David Ervine, began learning the language and set up the Turas Irish-Language Project in the predominately Unionist East Belfast area for others to learn the language in 2011.

== In popular culture ==
The 2024 biopic film Kneecap, in which the actual band members play themselves alongside more experienced actors including Michael Fassbender, Josie Walker, and Simone Kirby, is set in the Gaeltacht Quarter in 2019. The film premiered at the Sundance Film Festival on January 18, 2024, the first motion picture in the Irish language to do so.

== See also ==
- An Cumann Gaelach, QUB
- Comhairle na Gaelscolaíochta
- Forbairt Feirste
- Languages of Northern Ireland
- Líofa
- Líonraí Gaeilge
- Identity and Language (Northern Ireland) Act 2022
- Irish language in Britain
- POBAL
