= Gaelscoil =

School in which Irish is the working language

A Gaelscoil (Irish pronunciation: [ˈɡeːl̪ˠsˠkɛlʲ]; plural: Gaelscoileanna) is an Irish language-medium school in Ireland; the term refers especially to Irish-medium schools outside the Irish-speaking regions or Gaeltacht. Over 50,000 students attend Gaelscoileanna at primary and second levels on the island of Ireland. Additionally, more than 13,000 students are receiving their primary and second level education through Irish in the Gaeltacht. Gaelscoileanna and Irish-medium schools in the Gaeltacht are supported and represented by Gaeloideachas and An Chomhairle um Oideachas Gaeltachta & Gaelscolaíochta or COGG in the Republic of Ireland and by Comhairle na Gaelscolaíochta in Northern Ireland. The largest patron body of Gaelscoileanna in the Republic of Ireland is An Foras Pátrúnachta, although the vast majority of schools under their patronage are at primary level.

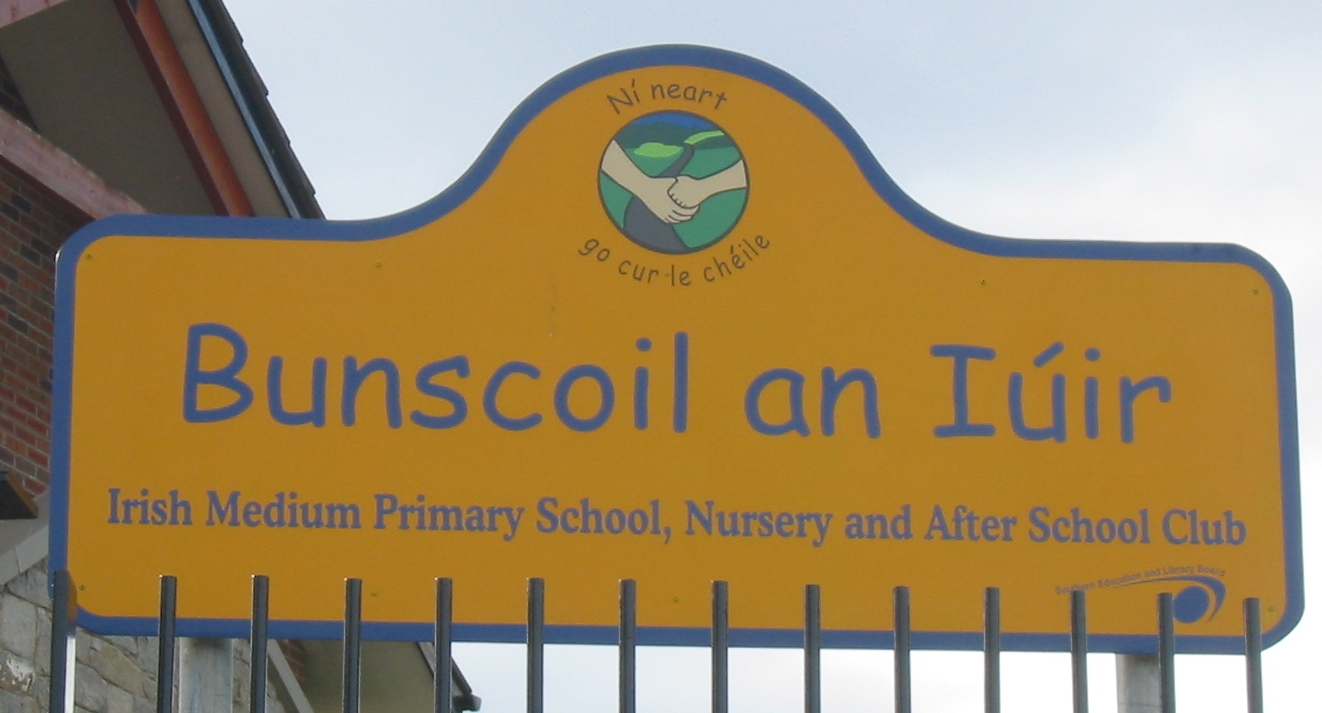
Sign for primary Gaelscoil in Newry, Northern Ireland

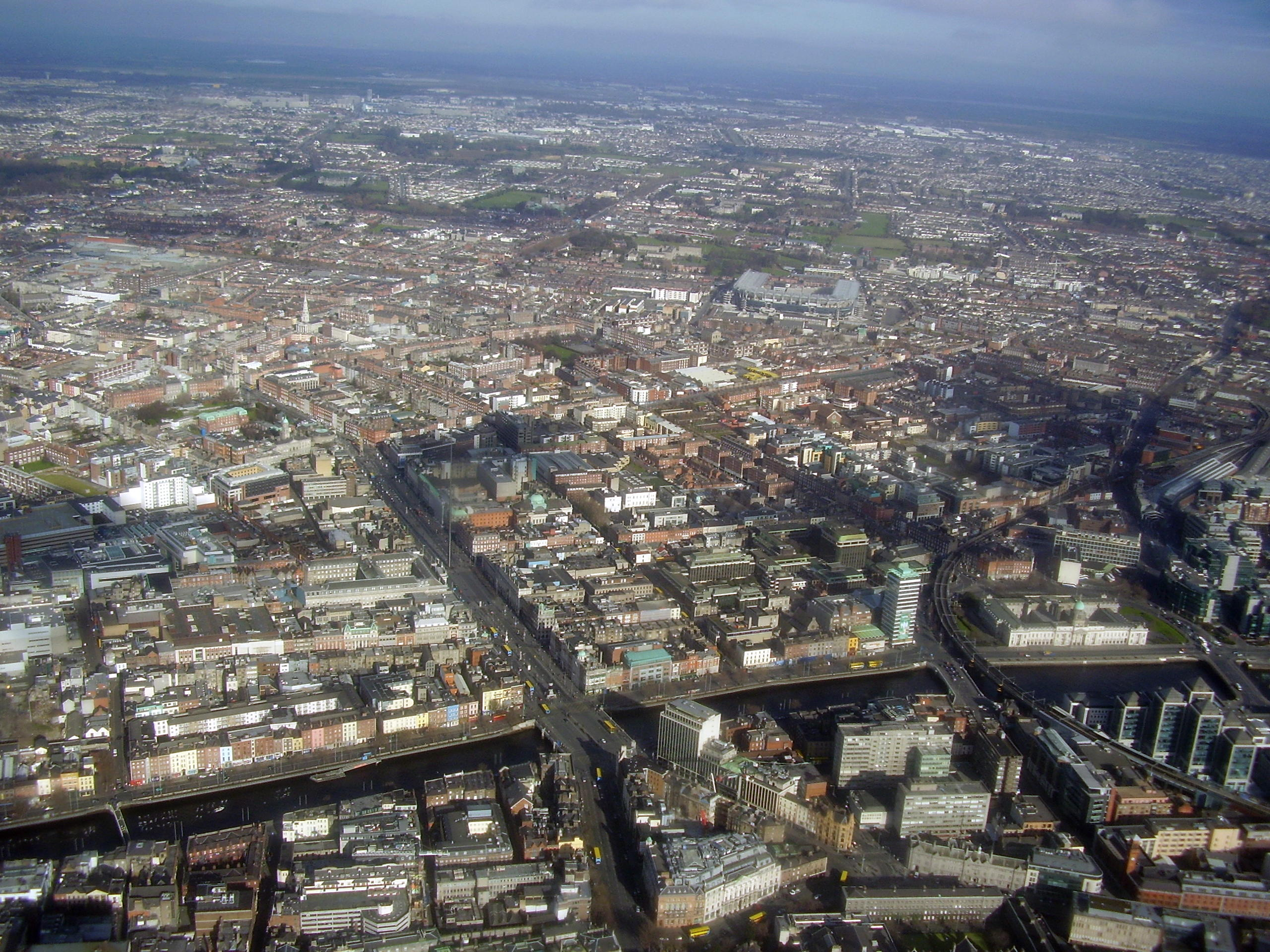
County Dublin has over 50 Irish language-medium schools attended by over 13,000 pupils.

Students in the Gaelscoileanna acquire the Irish language through language immersion, and study the standard curriculum through it. Gaelscoileanna, unlike English-medium schools, have the reputation of producing competent Irish speakers. English-medium schools, in contrast, produce relatively few fluent Irish speakers, despite the Irish language being an obligatory subject in the Republic of Ireland in both primary and secondary school. This has been attributed in part to the lack of Irish-language immersion programs.

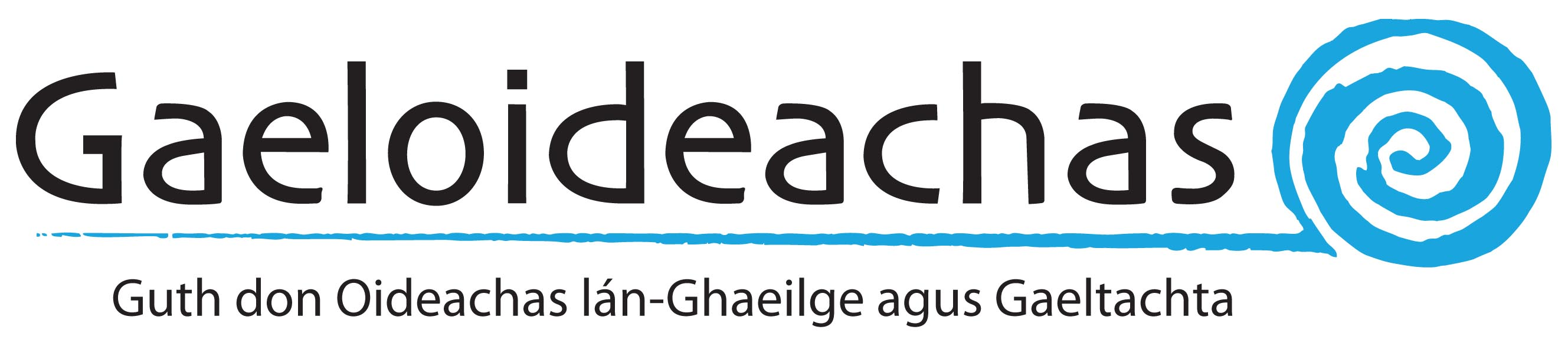
Gaelscoileanna and Irish language-medium schools in the Gaeltacht are supported and represented by Gaeloideachas and An Chomhairle um Oideachas Gaeltachta & Gaelscolaíochta or COGG in the Republic of Ireland and by Comhairle na Gaelscolaíochta in Northern Ireland.

Gaelscoileanna have undergone a striking expansion over the last few decades, although there are now concerns that rules limiting the founding of new schools are affecting the establishment of new Irish-medium education in areas where there is competition amongst educational patrons. Their success is due to effective (though limited) community support and an efficient administrative infrastructure. They are distinguished by being the product, not of state policy, but of a genuine community movement.

In 1972, there were only 11 such schools at primary level and five at secondary level in the Republic of Ireland. As of September 2023, there were 188 gaelscoileanna at primary level, attended by over 40,000 students, and 32 gaelcholáistí and 17 aonaid Ghaeilge (Irish language units) at secondary level, attended by over 12,000 students in non-Gaeltacht areas across Ireland. 35 of these primary schools, two of the postprimary schools and four of the postprimary units operated are in Northern Ireland. Additionally, some 4,000 children attend Irish-medium preschools or Naíonraí outside the Gaeltacht with around 1,000 children attending Naíonraí within the Gaeltacht. There is now at least one gaelscoil in every county in Ireland with over 50 in County Dublin; 30 in County Cork and 13 in County Antrim included.

== Social status and function ==
Gaelscoileanna have acquired a reputation for providing excellent academic results at a moderate cost. They have been described as a system of "positive social selection" giving better than average access to tertiary education and the social and employment opportunities which follow. An analysis of "feeder" schools which send students on to tertiary level institutions shows that 22% of Irish-medium schools send all their students on to tertiary level, compared to 7% of English-medium schools.

Supporters argue that the bilingualism resulting from early acquisition of another language is of general intellectual benefit and helps children to learn other languages. Irish-language advocates of the immersion approach sometimes refer to studies showing that bilingual children have advantages over monoglot children in other subjects.

== Statistics ==
Primary level	Republic of Ireland (2024-25)	North of Ireland (2025)
Total no. of schools	3,064	775
No. of Gaelscoileanna (non-Gaeltacht)	150	28
No of Gaelscoileanna (in Gaeltacht)	102	-
Total no. of pupils	535,476	174,778
No. Gaelscoil pupils (%) (non-Gaeltacht)	36,136 (6.8%)	4,269 (2.4%)
No. Gaelscoil pupils (%) (in Gaeltacht)	7,013 (1.3%)	-

=== By province (primary level) ===
- Leinster – 19,331 primary students attend 71 gaelscoileanna.
- Ulster – 6,801 primary students attend 45 gaelscoileanna.
- Munster – 11,332 primary students attend 44 gaelscoileanna.
- Connacht – 3,509 primary students attend 18 gaelscoileanna.

== Post-primary education through Irish / Gaelcholásite ==
A secondary-level Gaelscoil located in a non-Gaeltacht area is known as a Gaelcholáiste. There are 32 Gaelcholáistí and 17 second-level Irish language units (aonaid Ghaeilge) on the island of Ireland, attended by over 12,000 students. Close to 4,000 further students receive their second-level education through Irish in the Gaeltacht.

Two new second-level gaelscoileanna opened in Ireland in 2014: Coláiste Ghlór na Mara in Balbriggan and Gaelcholáiste an Phiarsaigh in Rathfarnham (both in County Dublin). Gaelcholáiste Charraig Uí Leighin opened in Cork's Carrigaline and Gaelcholáiste Dhoire the North of Ireland's second gaelcholáiste opened in Dungiven Castle in 2015. Gaelcholáiste Mhic Shuibhne opened in Cork's Knocknaheeney in 2019. Gaelcholáiste Mhaigh Nuad opened in Maynooth in 2020.

Gaelcholáistí are supported and represented on a practical day-to-day basis by Gaeloideachas (who also support Irish-medium schools in the Gaeltacht), by COGG - An Chomhairle um Oideachas Gaeltachta & Gaelscolaíochta (council for gaeltacht and gaelscoileanna education) in the Republic of Ireland and by Comhairle na Gaelscolaíochta in the North of Ireland.

In 2023 An Foras Pátrúnacha revealed that there is a demand for 7 new Gaelcholáistí in the Republic of Ireland and in 2021 Comhairle na Gaelscolaíochta revealed that there is a demand for 3 new Gaelcholáistí in Northern Ireland.

=== List of Gaelcholáistí ===
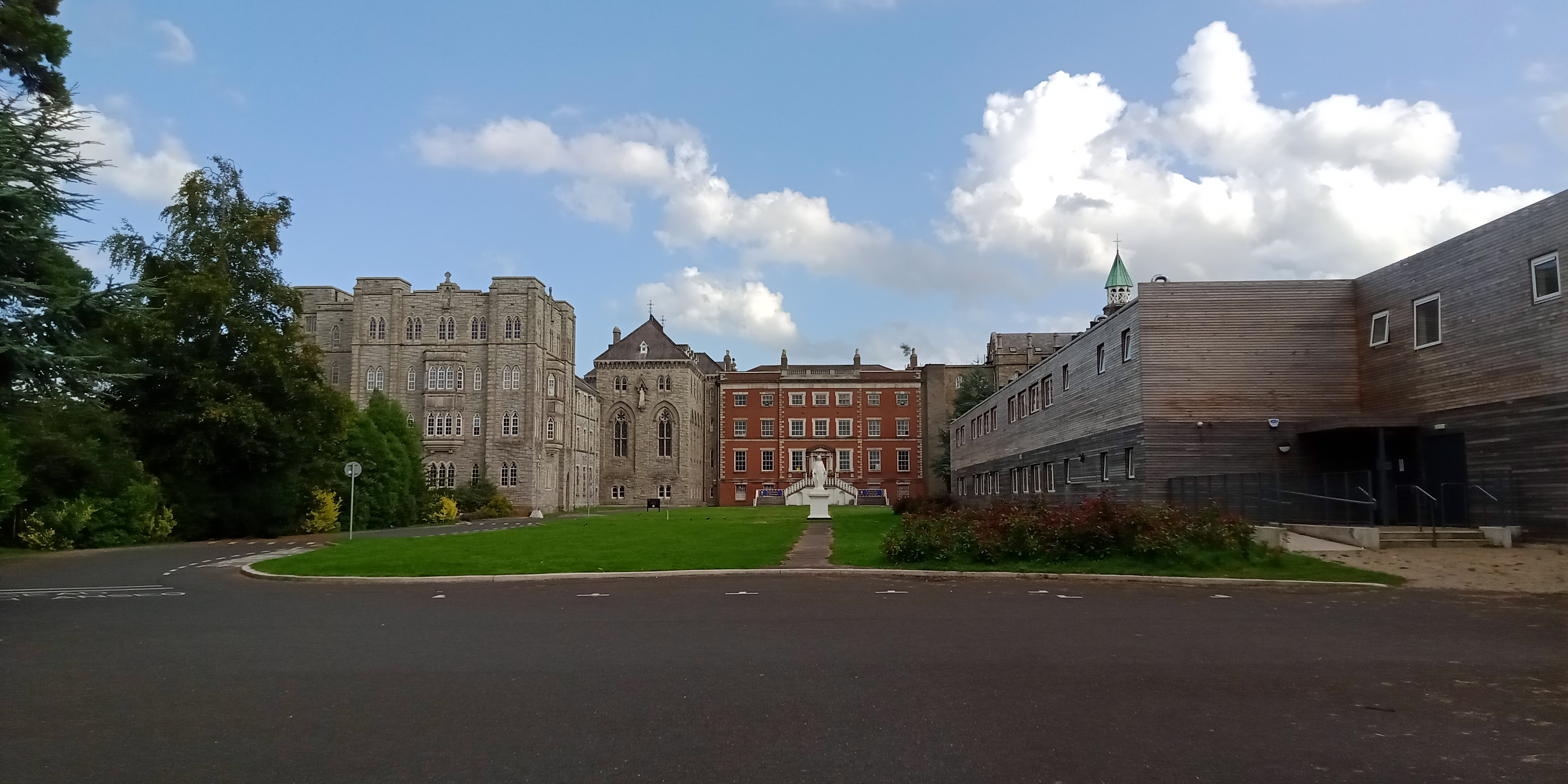
Coláiste an Phiarsaigh

School name	Location	County	Region	Ref.
Coláiste Ailigh	Letterkenny	Donegal	Republic of Ireland	
Coláiste Chilliain	Clondalkin	Dublin	Republic of Ireland	
Coláiste Cois Life	Lucan	Dublin	Republic of Ireland	
Coláiste Eoin	Booterstown	Dublin	Republic of Ireland	
Coláiste Feirste	Belfast	Antrim	Northern Ireland	
Coláiste Ghlór na Mara	Balbriggan	Dublin	Republic of Ireland	
Coláiste Mhuire	Cabra	Dublin	Republic of Ireland	
Coláiste Ráithín	Bray	Wicklow	Republic of Ireland	
Coláiste an Eachréidh	Athenry	Galway	Republic of Ireland	
Coláiste an Phiarsaigh	Cork	Cork	Republic of Ireland	
Coláiste de hÍde	Tallaght	Dublin	Republic of Ireland	
Coláiste na Coiribe	Galway	Galway	Republic of Ireland	
Coláiste na Tulchann	Clonsilla	Dublin	Republic of Ireland	
Coláiste Íosagáin	Booterstown	Dublin	Republic of Ireland	
Gaelcholáiste Charraig Uí Leighin	Cork	Cork	Republic of Ireland	
Gaelcholáiste Cheatharlach	Carlow	Carlow	Republic of Ireland	
Gaelcholáiste Chiarraí	Tralee	Kerry	Republic of Ireland	
Gaelcholáiste Chill Dara	Naas	Kildare	Republic of Ireland	
Gaelcholáiste Chéitinn	CTI Clonmel	Tipperary	Republic of Ireland	
Gaelcholáiste Choilm	Cork	Cork	Republic of Ireland	
Gaelcholáiste Dhoire	Dungiven	Londonderry	Northern Ireland	
Gaelcholáiste Luimnigh	Limerick	Limerick	Republic of Ireland	
Gaelcholáiste Mhaigh Nuad	Maynooth	Kildare	Republic of Ireland	
Gaelcholáiste Mhic Shuibhne	Knocknaheeny	Cork	Republic of Ireland	
Gaelcholáiste Mhuire (A.G.)	Cork	Cork	Republic of Ireland	
Gaelcholáiste Reachrann	Donaghmede	Dublin	Republic of Ireland	
Gaelcholáiste na Mara	Arklow	Wicklow	Republic of Ireland	
Gaelcoláiste an Phiarsaigh	Rathfarnham	Dublin	Republic of Ireland	
Meanscoil Gharman	Enniscorthy	Wexford	Republic of Ireland	
Scoil Chaitríona	Glasnevin	Dublin	Republic of Ireland	

== Strategy proposals ==
The function and future of Gaelscoileanna in the Republic of Ireland falls within the scope of the 20-Year Strategy for the Irish Language 2010-2030, published by the then-Irish government in December 2010. This report emphasises the importance of offering all children in primary schools in Ireland the opportunity to experience partial immersion in the formative years of primary education. It calls for primary teachers to have additional immersion classes to improve their competence in the language. This would involve teaching some subjects such as Mathematics and Science in Irish.

== See also ==
- An Foras Pátrúnachta
- Calandreta, bilingual French-Occitan school in Occitania, France
- Diwan (school) – Breton medium education in Brittany
- Education in the Republic of Ireland
- Education in Northern Ireland
- French immersion in Canada
- Gaelic medium education in Scotland – Scottish Gaelic equivalent in Scotland
- Ikastola, similar education centre in Basque language
- Kōhanga reo and Kura Kaupapa Māori, Māori language immersion schools in Aotearoa/New Zealand
- La Bressola, a bilingual French-Catalan school network in Northern Catalonia, France
- List of Irish medium primary schools in Northern Ireland
- Medium of instruction
- Official Languages Act 2003
- Welsh medium education
