= Comhairle na Gaelscolaíochta =

Organisation for Irish-medium education in Northern Ireland

Comhairle na Gaelscolaíochta or CnaG is the representative body for Irish-language medium education in Northern Ireland. Its name translates into English as the Council for Irish-language medium education. It was established in 2000 by the Northern Ireland Department of Education to promote, facilitate and encourage Irish-language medium education across Northern Ireland. As of early 2021 there are over 90 schools providing Irish-medium education to over 7,000 students at pre-school, primary and post primary level in Northern Ireland. Comhairle na Gaelscolaíochta is a separate organisation from the Republic of Ireland's An Chomhairle um Oideachas Gaeltachta & Gaelscolaíochta or COGG.

== See also ==
- List of Irish language media
- Irish language in Northern Ireland
- Ulster Irish
