= Neo-Gaeltacht =

Area outside of the Gaeltacht where Irish is used as a spoken language

A Neo-Gaeltacht (Irish: Nua-Ghaeltacht) is an area not part of the officially defined or traditional Gaeltacht but where the Irish language has a strong presence as a spoken language. It has been argued that non-Gaeltacht activist groups wishing to establish an Irish language community need to show that it is large, permanent and formally organised and that it has a growing number of people using Irish as their first language. Another objective is a situation in which children use Irish among themselves and with other Irish speakers in a natural way while being able to deal with a largely English-speaking world.

Under the Gaeltacht Act 2012, the Republic of Ireland's Department of Tourism, Culture, Arts, Gaeltacht, Sport and Media has said that areas outside the traditional Gaeltacht areas may be designated as Líonraí Gaeilge/Irish Language Networks, subject to them fulfilling particular criteria. In 2018 Foras na Gaeilge announced that Carn Tóchair in County Londonderry was going to be one of the first five Líonraí Gaeilge (areas with Irish-speaking networks) on the island of Ireland, along with networks recognised in West Belfast, Loughrea in County Galway, Ennis in County Clare, and Clondalkin in Dublin.

== Northern Ireland ==
=== Belfast ===
In 2002, a major report of the West Belfast Task Force recommended designating part of West Belfast into An Cheathrú Ghaeltachta / The Gaeltacht Quarter. The Joint West Belfast/Greater Shankill Task Force Report stated that the aim of the Quarter is to "secure wealth creation by maximising the economic opportunities provided by a growing cluster of Irish Language and cultural based enterprises and activities which additionally have significant tourist potential". The proposal was accepted and put into force by the Department of Culture, Arts and Leisure in Northern Ireland.

Belfast's Gaeltacht Quarter is now an area in which the Irish language is spoken widely. The area is home to Gaelscoileanna (Irish-medium primary schools), a Gaelcholáiste (an Irish-medium secondary school), naíonraí (crèches) and naíscoileanna (nursery schools). The area has Irish-speaking staff members working in local restaurants and agencies and is home to both Cultúrlann McAdam Ó Fiaich (the city's biggest Irish language cultural centre) and Irish language development organisation Forbairt Feirste. The Gaeltacht Quarter also hosts the community radio station Raidió Fáilte, Northern Ireland's only full-time Irish language radio station which broadcasts across Belfast and which seeks to get a license on FM to broadcast more widely.

In 2018, Foras na Gaeilge announced that West Belfast was going to be recognised as one of the first five areas with a Líonra Gaeilge / Irish Language Network on the island of Ireland.

=== South County Londonderry ===
An area in southern County Londonderry centred on Slaghtneill (Sleacht Néill) and Carntogher (Carn Tóchair), both outside Maghera, which had gone from being 50% Irish-speaking in 1901 to having only a few speakers by the end of the century, has seen a language revival since the setting up of a naíscoil in 1993 and a Gaelscoil in 1994. In 2008 two local organisations launched a "strategy for the rebirth of the Gaeltacht", based on Irish-medium primary and secondary education. Announcing the launch, Éamon Ó Cuív, the Republic of Ireland's Minister for the Gaeltacht, said that the area was "an example to other areas all over Ireland which are working to reestablish Irish as a community language".

In 2018, Foras na Gaeilge announced that Carn Tóchair was going to be recognised as one of the first five areas with a Líonra Gaeilge on the island of Ireland outside of the Gaeltacht.

== Republic of Ireland ==
=== Urban language networks ===
The 2016 census showed that Dublin had the largest concentration of people who spoke Irish daily outside the education system, with 14,229 such speakers - 18 percent of the national population of daily speakers. In a survey of a small sample of adults who had grown up in Dublin and had completed full-time education, 54% of respondents reported some fluency in Irish, ranging from being able to make small talk to complete fluency. Only 19% of speakers spoke Irish three or more times per week, with a plurality (43%) speaking Irish less than once a fortnight.

There have been several proposals over the years, as in Cork in the 1960s, to establish an urban Neo-Gaeltacht. In a special report on Nuacht TG4 news in 2009, it was confirmed that a group in Ballymun, a predominantly working-class area in Dublin, had, in conjunction with the local branch of Glór na nGael, received planning permission to build 40 homes for people who wanted to live in an Irish-speaking community within the city. There is no evidence that this project is still considered viable.

Gaelscoileanna and Gaelcholáistí are now well established in the Republic of Ireland, especially in Dublin, and Cork city, and Ballymun, for example, now has two Gaelscoileanna.

In 2018, Foras na Gaeilge announced that under the Gaeltacht Act 2012 Loughrea, Ennis and Clondalkin in the Republic of Ireland were going to be officially recognised as among the first five areas with Líonraí Gaeilge (Irish Language Networks) on the island of Ireland, along with Belfast and Carn Tóchair in Northern Ireland.

=== West Clare Network ===
Parts of County Clare were recognised as Gaeltacht areas following recommendations made by Coimisiún na Gaeltachta in 1925. This was provided for legally under the Gaeltacht (Housing) Acts 1929-2001. There were Irish speakers west of Ennis, in Kilmihil, Kilrush, Doonbeg, Doolin, Ennistimon, Carrigaholt, Lisdoonvarna and Ballyvaughan. Census figures for Gaeltacht areas in Clare for 1926 show 9,123 female Irish speakers and 10,046 male speakers.

In 1933, Statutory Instrument No. 85, the Vocational Education (Gaeltacht) Area Order, was made under section 103 of the Vocational Education Act 1930, and inter alia, set out the names of District Electoral Divisions in Ennis, Ennistymon, Kilrush and Miltown Malbay that formed part of the Gaeltacht in the Administrative County of Clare. This statutory instrument appears to be still on the statute books, however, in 1956, it was decided that there were too few traditional speakers in County Clare to justify its inclusion in the official Gaeltacht.

The main group promoting the language in Clare is Coiste Forbartha na Gaeltachta Chontae an Chláir (The Gaeltacht Development Committee for County Clare). It says that there is a demand for Gaeltacht status. It has also claimed that native speakers who received grants under the Scéim Labhairt na Gaeilge, a scheme first established by the State in 1933 with the aim of supporting the language among traditional speakers, still live in the county and speak Irish. In 2012, it claimed that there were 170 daily speakers. The chair of the Committee, Seosamh Mac Ionnrachtaigh, has stated that West Clare is a "Breac-Ghaeltacht" (an area of hybrid language use, where spoken Irish is still heard to some degree). There are, however, no official statistics to confirm the number of daily speakers locally.

Between 2012 and 2018, Coiste Forbartha Gaeltachta Chontae an Chláir published In Ard an Tráthnóna Siar, an Irish-language planning journal devoted to the restoration and continuation of traditional Irish throughout West Clare. Events in Clare where Irish is used are regularly organised by language activists. The language group An Clár as Gaeilge organises the festivals Féile na hInse and An Fhéile Scoldrámaíochta, and encourages businesses to use the language. There are also weekly language classes.

In 2018, Foras na Gaeilge announced that Ennis in Clare was to be recognised as one of the first five areas outside the Gaeltacht on the island of Ireland with an official Líonraí Gaeilge / Irish Language Network.

== North America ==
Tamworth-Erinsville, Ontario is a planned Neo-Gaeltacht area in Canada. It is unusual in having no resident Irish speakers, serving instead as a meeting place for Irish speakers from elsewhere, and therefore a link for otherwise dispersed networks.

== See also ==
- Language revitalization
- Gaeltacht Act 2012
- Líonraí Gaeilge
- Bailte Seirbhísí Gaeltachta
- Status of the Irish language
