= Official Languages Act 2003 =

Act of the Oireachtas No. 32 of 2003

Oireachtas
- Long title: An Act to promote the use of the Irish language for official purposes in the State; to provide for the use of both official languages of the State in parliamentary proceedings, in Acts of the Oireachtas, in the administration of Justice, in communicating with or providing services to the public and in carrying out the work of public bodies; to set out the duties of such bodies with respect to the official languages of the State, and for those purposes, to provide for the establishment of the Office of the Official Languages Commissioner and to define its functions; to provide for the publication by the Commissioner of certain information relevant to the purposes of this Act; and to provide for related matters
- Citation: Act 32 of 2003
- Assented to: 2003-07-03

Legislative history
- Bill title: Official Languages Bill 2002
- Bill citation: Bill 24 of 2002

Keywords
- legal recognition of the Irish language
- Status: Amended

The Official Languages Act 2003 (Irish: Acht na dTeangacha Oifigiúla 2003) is an Act of the Oireachtas of Ireland. The Act sets out rules regarding use of the Irish language by public bodies; established the office of An Coimisinéir Teanga to monitor and enforce compliance by public bodies with the provisions of the Official Languages Act; and made provision for the designation of official Irish-language versions of placenames and the removal of the official status of English placenames in the Gaeltacht. The Act is being implemented on a phased basis.

== Equal status between the Irish language and English language ==
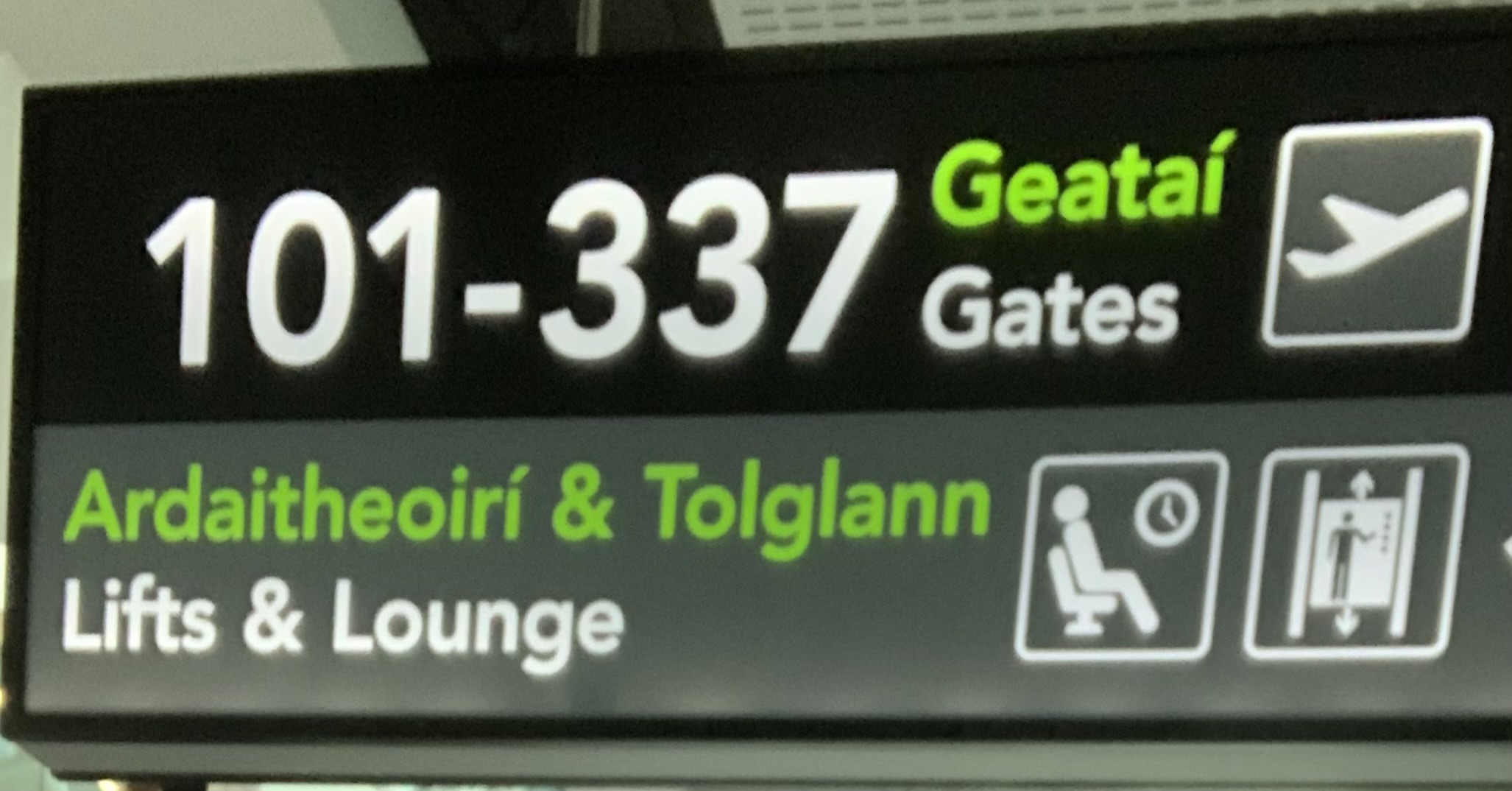
Dublin airport sign in both English and Irish languages

According to the Act the provision of services by the state in both the Irish and English languages should generally be the same. This means in practice that all state forms, some documents and major reports must be available in both languages and that Irish speakers should be able to do all of their business with the state through Irish if they so wish, subject to there being enough Irish speakers working in the public sector to provide the services. Also both the Irish language and English language should have equal status or prominence on most new state signage and stationery and there must be an Irish-language option on public sector customer phone lines and state-run websites. The Act also allowed for the introduction of bilingual automated speaker announcements on public transport and other less prominent instances of a bilingual policy in respect of the two official national languages. The only state-area not to be covered by the Official Languages Act in Ireland to date is road signage whose policy falls under the Department of Transport. The Official Languages Act 2003 does not cover the business or private sectors.

== Placenames under the Official Languages Act ==
On 30 October 2003, Part 5 of the Official Languages Act came into effect. Under Part 5, the responsible minister (now the Minister for Rural and Community Development and the Gaeltacht), having received and considered advice from the Placenames Commission, may by ministerial order declare the Irish-language version of a placename specified in a Placenames Order. The principal legal effects of a placename order are one or other of the following:

- in respect of any placename outside the Gaeltacht, the Irish and the English versions of the placename have the same status and the same legal force and effect; and
- in respect of a placename in the Gaeltacht, the Irish version of the placename has legal force and effect while the English version of the placename has none.

Any Placenames Order is without prejudice to private use of the Irish or English-language versions of a placename. In many cases, it is also without prejudice to public use of a placename. However, where a Placenames Order is made in respect of placenames in the Gaeltacht, the English version of such placenames cannot be used in three instances: in future Acts of the Oireachtas; in road or street signs erected by or on behalf of a local authority; and in statutory instruments. Under Irish law, a "Statutory Instrument" includes "an order, regulation, rule, bye-law, warrant, licence, certificate, direction, notice, guideline or other like document made, issued, granted or otherwise created by or under an Act [of the Oireachtas and certain pre-Irish constitution Acts]".

The minister has made several Placename Orders. The Placenames (Ceantair Ghaeltachta) Order 2004 came into operation on 28 March 2005. This Placenames Order was in respect of placenames in the Gaeltacht and, therefore, one of its effects was to remove all legal force and effect from the English-language version of hundreds of placenames. As a result, today towns such as those formerly officially known as Belmullet and Spiddal are now, in law, known only as Béal an Mhuirthead and An Spidéal. In Dingle, County Kerry, a plebiscite organised by Kerry County Council voted to restore the official status of the English name and to revert the official Irish name from An Daingean to Daingean Uí Chúis. The council action was ultra vires, so in 2011 the Local Government Act 2001 was amended to make the name changes in relation to Dingle and to allow similar plebiscites elsewhere.

== Official translations ==
Section 7 of the 2003 act requires that an official Irish translation of each act of the Oireachtas must be published simultaneously with the publication of its English version. However, several complex acts have sections making themselves exempt from this provision. A 2011 amendment to the act exempts electronic publishing of acts from the provision - Official Languages Act 2003 (Section 9) Regulations 2008.

== Official Languages (Amendment) Act 2021 ==
Official Languages (Amendment) Act 2021

Oireachtas
- Long title: An Act to amend and extend the Official Languages Act 2003; to amend the Juries Act 1976; and to provide for related matters.
- Citation: Act 49 of 2021
- Assented to: 2003-07-03

Legislative history
- Bill title: Official Languages (Amendment) Bill 2019
- Bill citation: Bill 104 of 2019

Keywords
- legal recognition of the Irish language
- Status: In force

In 2011, the Minister of State at the Department of Arts, Heritage and the Gaeltacht, Dinny McGinley announced at that year's Oireachtas na Gaeilge that he was launching a review of the Official Languages Act 2003. This led to the Official Languages (Amendment) Act 2021, which was introduced to the Dáil in 2019 by Minister Seán Kyne and signed into law in 2021.

The biggest aim of the Act is for a quota of 20% of public sectors jobs to be designated for Irish speakers by 2030 with a National Plan for the Provision of Public Services in Irish to be developed. The Act further states that all public offices in the Gaeltacht will operate through the medium of Irish, and that state companies will have to spend 20% of their advertising budgets on advertising through the Irish language with a quarter of that 20% at a minimum having to be spent on the Irish language media. The Act also obliges State organisations to spell Irish speakers' names and addresses accurately with acute accents (síneadh fada).

These measures were phased in and are now all in force.

== 20-year target ==
The successful implementation of the act forms part of the 20-Year Strategy for the Irish Language 2010–2030 to have at least 250,000 daily speakers of Irish by 2030.

== See also ==
- An Coimisinéir Teanga - The Language Commissioner.
- Irish language
- Status of the Irish language
- Gaeltacht - Irish speaking regions in Ireland.
- Gaeltacht Act 2012
- Údarás na Gaeltachta
- Bailte Seirbhísí Gaeltachta - Gaeltacht Service Towns.
- Líonraí Gaeilge - Irish Language Networks.
- 20-Year Strategy for the Irish Language 2010–2030
- Gaelscoil - Irish language-medium school. Plural - Gaelscoileanna.
- Irish language outside Ireland
- Gaelic Language (Scotland) Act 2005
- Welsh Language Act 1993
