= An Coiste Téarmaíochta =

Council for official Irish language terminology

- Formation: 1968; 58 years ago
- Official language: Irish
- Chair: Fidelma Ní Ghallchobhair
- Vice-Chair: Donla Uí Bhraonáin
- Parent organization: Foras na Gaeilge
- Téarma
- Website type: Lexical database for terminology
- Founded: 2004
- Owners: Foras na Gaeilge; Glaois research group
- Website: tearma.ie
- Current status: Active

An Coiste Téarmaíochta is the Terminology Committee of Foras na Gaeilge. It chooses terminology for words and new concepts in the Irish language. It was founded in 1968 and was initially a state-body, being a division of the Department of Education. Under the Good Friday Agreement, Foras na Gaeilge was founded in 1999 and was charged with the development of new terminology in Irish. An Coiste Téarmaíochta has been operating as part of the Foras since then.

Their work can be found on Téarma.ie, a lexical database for Irish terminology formed in 2004 in a partnership between An Coiste Téarmaíochta and the Glaois research group.

== Membership ==
There roughly 25 members on the Coiste Téarmaíochta. They are people from universities, state bodies and language bodies, and experts on various matters. The first annual meeting of An Coiste Téarmaíocht was on 19 December 1969.
