= Status of the Gaelic languages =

Status of the Gaelic languages may refer to:

- Status of the Irish language
- Manx language § Revival
- Scottish Gaelic § Status

== See also ==
- Celtic Revival
- Gaelic revival, a 19th-century movement to foster use of the Irish language
- Goidelic languages § Origin, history, and range
