= An tUltach =

Discontinued monthly literary magazine in Ireland

- Editor: Ciarán Ó Pronntaigh
- Categories: Irish literature
- Frequency: Monthly
- Publisher: Comhaltas Uladh
- Founded: 1924
- Final issue: April 2018
- Country: Ireland
- Based in: Ulster
- Language: Irish language
- Website: antultach.wordpress.com

An tUltach (Irish pronunciation: [ənˠ ˈt̪ˠʊl̪ˠt̪ˠəx]; meaning "the Ulster-person") was the official magazine of Comhaltas Uladh, the Ulster branch of Conradh na Gaeilge (the Gaelic League). It was in circulation from 1924 to 2018.

== History and profile ==
Established in 1924, An tUltach was the oldest or second-oldest Irish language magazine in circulation in the early 2000s.

An tUltach promoted creative writing in Irish and had such celebrated contributors as Seosamh Mac Grianna and Muiris Ó Droighneáin. Its first editor was the founder of Comhaltas Uladh, Fr. Lorcán Ó Muireadhaigh, and its last editor was Ciarán Ó Pronntaigh with manager Seán Ó Murchadha.

An tUltach used to be funded in part by the Arts Council for Northern Ireland. It also received funding from Foras na Gaeilge, but at the end of June 2013 Foras na Gaeilge stated that such funding, received via a block grant to Comhaltas Uladh, was to end with immediate effect.

An tUltach ceased regular paper publication in April 2018 and its website has not seen an update since 2019. A manager of the magazine in November 2018 said that a public grant of £30,000 was paid to make the 100-year archive available. But as of March 2020 this had not been implemented. However the website still accepts pay subscriptions.

== See also ==
- List of Celtic-language media
