= Permanent North American Gaeltacht =

Irish-language training site in Ontario, Canada

North American Gaeltacht Gaeltacht an Oileáin Úir Permanent North American Gaeltacht
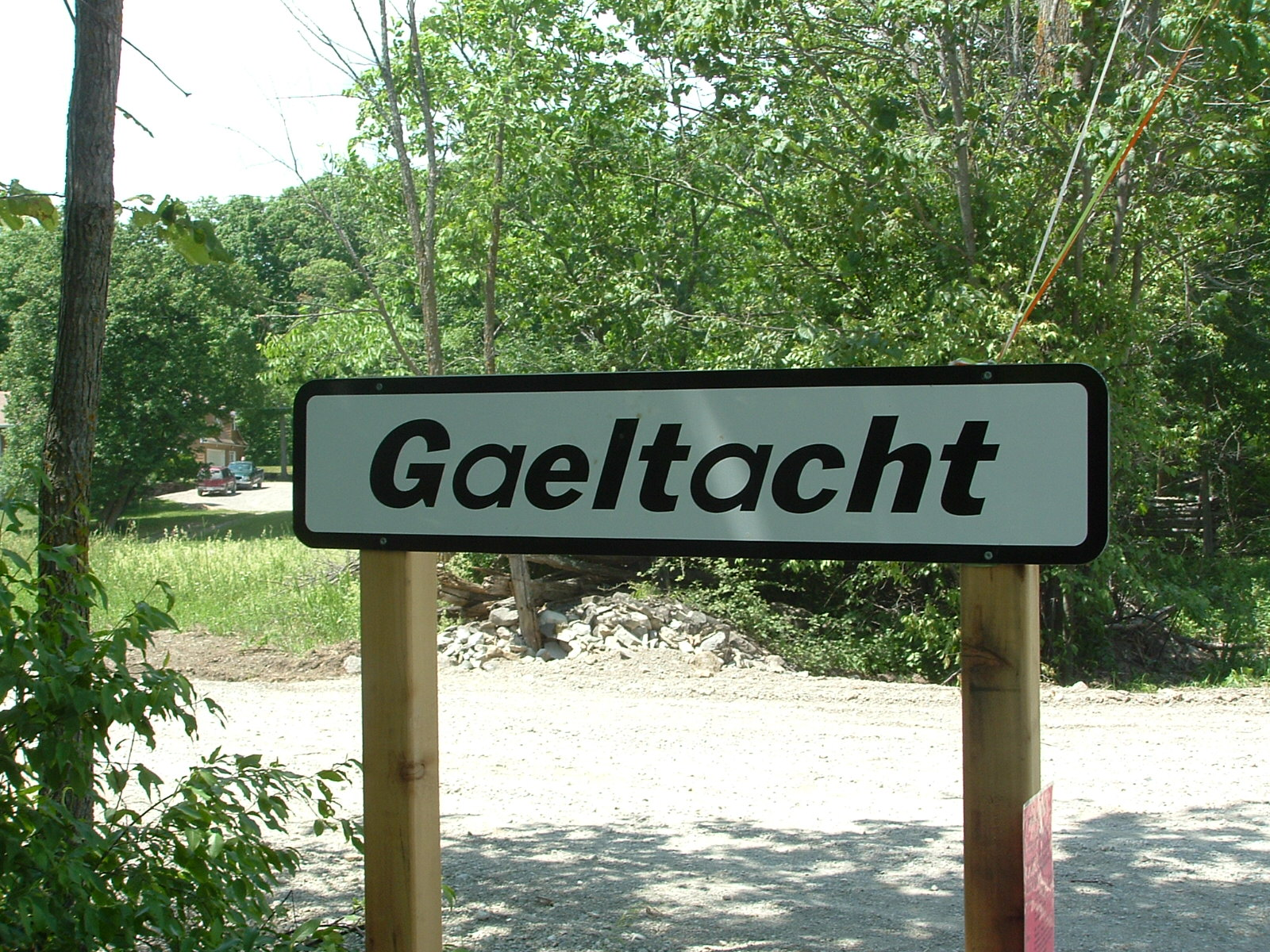
- Signage at the site entrance

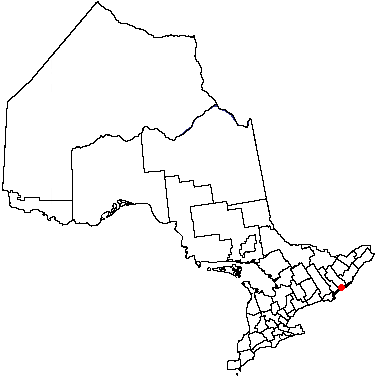
- Coordinates: 44°30′06″N 76°59′04″W
- Country: Canada
- Province: Ontario
- Established: 16 June 2007 (as the first official Gaeltacht outside Ireland)

Area
  - Land: 0.24 km^{2} (0.093 sq mi)
- seasonal
- Time zone: UTC-5 (Eastern (EST))

The North American Gaeltacht (Irish: Gaeltacht an Oileáin Úir) is a gathering place for Irish-language speakers in the community of Tamworth, Ontario, in Canada. The nearest main township is Erinsville, Ontario. Unlike in Ireland, where the term Gaeltacht refers to an area where Irish is the traditional language, this part of Ontario has no resident native Irish speakers. The name refers instead to its being a meeting place for Irish speakers from North America and elsewhere.

== History ==
Erinsville was settled by the Irish, and its first five mayors were Irish. As of early 2021, the organisation's website referred to it as the North American Gaeltacht or Ghaeltacht Thuaisceart an Oileáin Úir.

This site was the first and only officially sanctioned Gaeltacht (or "designated Irish-speaking area") to exist outside Ireland. The Gaeltacht's opening ceremony was attended by the Irish ambassador to Canada, Declan Kelly, and by Helen Gannon of Comhaltas Ceoltóirí Éireann. A statement was also released by the Minister for Community, Rural and Gaeltacht Affairs, Éamon Ó Cuív. In this, dated 29 May 2007, he stated: "I would like to congratulate the Canadian people for establishing a Gaeltacht in Canada, the first outside Ireland." Ó Cuív also approved the funding of €20,000 (C$28,835) for teacher training.

Following its launch, the project received some news coverage, primarily for the claim that it was the first of its kind outside Ireland, including by RTÉ and TG4 in Ireland, the BBC in the UK, and the Globe and Mail in Canada.

== Aims and activities ==
The project's stated aim is to "restore and maintain the language by having a place where speakers can make connections with each other, learn and practice Irish". The site is intended to be used for Irish language immersion weeks and to build a learning centre. Other objectives are to arrange exchanges with Gaeltacht families, to provide an Irish-language summer camp for children and to bring teachers from Ireland.

As of 2021, cultural events and "language immersion" courses were happening virtually and at the site.

== See also ==
- Neo-Gaeltacht
