= An Gúm =

Irish publisher

- Formation: 1925
- Founder: Irish Government
- Type: Irish language; Irish culture; Gaelic revival
- Headquarters: 63-66 Amiens Street, Dublin 1, Ireland
- Website: forasnagaeilge.ie

An Gúm (pronounced [ənˠ ˈɡuːmˠ], "The Scheme") is an Irish publisher. Tasked with the publication of Irish literature, especially educational materials, it was previously a state company of the Republic of Ireland. It now has an all-Ireland identity as part of Foras na Gaeilge. Its mission statement is "To produce publications and resources in support of Irish-medium education and of the use of Irish in general." Edel Ní Chorráin is Director of Publishing, Lexicography & Terminology Services.

== History ==
An Gúm was founded in 1925 as part of the Department of Education by Ernest Blythe, then Minister for Finance in the Irish Free State. Its purpose was to ensure a supply of textbooks and general books which would be required to implement the policy of reviving the Irish language.

The agency provided financial support for native Irish-language writers and published original writing in Irish by authors such as Máirtín Ó Cadhain, Seosamh Mac Grianna and Tomás Ó Criomhthain. An Gúm regularly publishes new editions of many books written and published in the 1920s and 1930s.

=== Translations ===
Many of the early publications were translations. At the time there was some criticism of Ernest Blythe regarding the choice of titles to be translated and from 1940 on, less and less translation of literary works was undertaken. There were some translations from European languages other than English, for example short stories by Chekhov. Translations of English-language books by American, British and Irish authors were more common, including well known titles such as Dracula and Wuthering Heights.

==== Drama ====
The first modern play performed in Irish on the stage was Casadh an tSugáin by Douglas Hyde in 1901. Drama was seen as important for the revival of the Irish language and the Cumann na nGaedheal government founded Taibhdhearc na Gaillimhe, the Irish-language theatre. Translations were used to increase the number of plays in Irish. The Spanish playwright María de la O Lejárraga, who often referenced Roman Catholic viewpoints, was seen as reflecting values shared by many Irish speakers. Taibhdhearc na Gaillimhe performed her work in the west of Ireland.

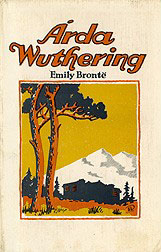
Wuthering Heights in Irish translation

=== Music ===
Until well into the 1960s, An Gúm also published musical scores, some of them expressly for educational purposes at Irish schools. During the 1930s and 1940s, this was one of the few publishing opportunities for contemporary Irish composers, including Rhoda Coghill, Aloys Fleischmann, Redmond Friel, Carl Hardebeck, John F. Larchet and Éamon Ó Gallchobhair.

=== Art work ===
The Burns Library at Boston College has a collection of original dust jackets in good condition.

== Belfast Agreement ==
An Gúm remained part of the Department of Education until 1999 when, with the Belfast Agreement, its functions were moved under the cross-border body, Foras na Gaeilge, responsible for the promotion of the Irish language throughout the island of Ireland. Foras na Gaeilge has a statutory obligation in respect of the publication of Irish language materials for education.

== Offices ==
=== Historic offices ===
An Gúm was based on O'Connell Street, Dublin, for much of the 20th century, before moving to premises in a building on North Frederick Street, shared with the National Educational Psychological Service, among others.

Irish was the working language of the office which incorporated a library of past publications.

=== Foras na Gaeilge ===
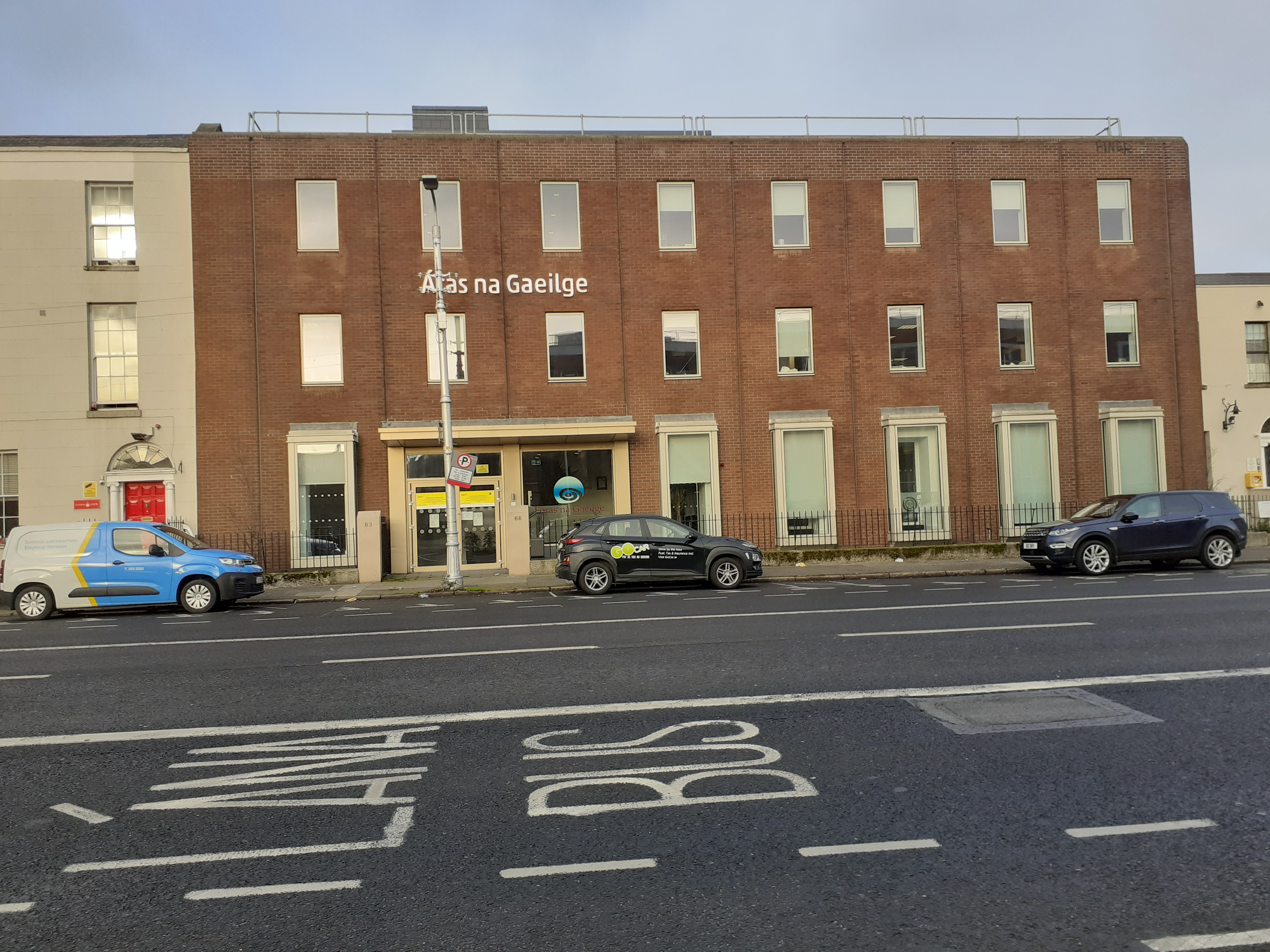

The head office of Foras na Gaeilge is at 63-66 Amiens Street, Dublin 1 (in Irish 63-66 Sráid Amiens, Baile Átha Cliath 1, Éire). It opened in 2018. There are offices at other places, including Gaoth Dobhair, County Donegal.

== Projects ==
The word "gúm" means "plan", "scheme" or "project". The agency was also known, in its early days, as An Scéim Foillsiúcháin (the publication scheme).

As well as publication and re-publication of books in Irish, including the editorial work involved, An Gúm has also been involved in several larger projects. These include:

=== Séideán Sí ===
As part of its remit to develop educational materials and textbooks in Irish, as of 2010 An Gúm was developing an "integrated, enjoyable and child-centred course for the teaching of Irish which aims to develop the language, cognitive, emotional and creative skills of the child". The syllabus is specifically, but not exclusively, designed for use in Gaeltacht schools and gaelscoileanna, where teaching takes place through the medium of the Irish language. Séideán Sí is a joint initiative of Foras na Gaeilge and the Department of Education. A range of materials are available, including books, posters, workbooks and cards.

=== Lexicography ===
The most famous book published by An Gúm is arguably the Foclóir Póca ("pocket dictionary"). This pocket Irish/English and English/Irish dictionary is described on the www.forasnagaeilge.ie website as an all-time bestseller in Ireland. Other dictionaries have been published by An Gúm, including those by Niall Ó Dónaill (Irish-English Dictionary) and Tomás de Bhaldraithe.

==== Foclóir Nua Béarla-Gaeilge ====
In the 21st century An Gúm has developed a "New English-Irish Dictionary". The Concise English-Irish Dictionary was published in 2020. The Concise English-Irish Dictionary was derived from the New English-Irish Dictionary.

==== "An Foclóir Nua Gaeilge" ====
In 2025 the president of Ireland, Catherine Connolly, launched a new monolingual Irish dictionary. This resource is available online, and was primarily funded by the Department of Rural and Community Development and the Gaeltacht in Dublin, and the Department for Communities in Belfast, with additional support from the Department of Education in Dublin.
