= Placenames Database of Ireland =

Database of place names in Ireland

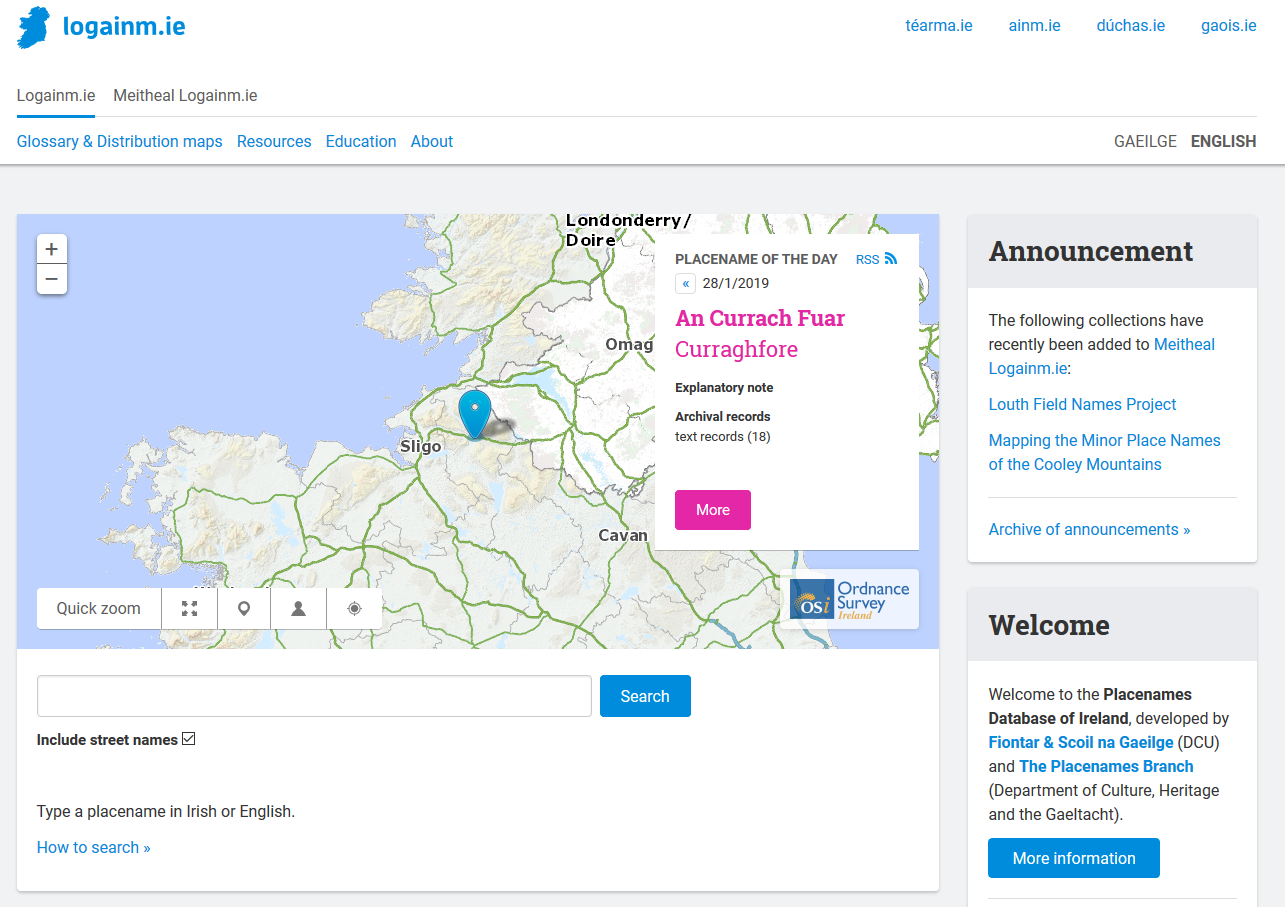
- Website type: Database, education, language
- Available in: Irish and English
- Owners: Department of Culture, Communications and Sport; An Brainse Logainmneacha; Fiontar & Scoil na Gaeilge
- Creators: Fiontar; An Coimisiún Logainmneacha
- Website: https://www.logainm.ie
- Commercial: No
- Registration: None
- Launched: October 2008
- Current status: Active

The Placenames Database of Ireland (Irish: Bunachar Logainmneacha na hÉireann), also known as logainm.ie, is a database and archive of place names in Ireland. It was created by Fiontar, Dublin City University in collaboration with the Placenames Branch of the Department of Culture, Communications and Sport.

The website is a public resource primarily aimed at journalists and translators, students and teachers, historians and researchers in genealogy.

== Placenames Commission and Placenames Branch ==
The Placenames Commission (Irish: an Coimisiún Logainmneacha) was established by the Department of Finance in 1946 to advise Ordnance Survey Ireland and the government of what the Irish name of places should be.

Although both the 1922 Constitution of the Irish Free State and the current constitution adopted in 1937 recognised Irish as the national language, the law in regard to placenames was carried over from the 19th-century UK statutes which established the Ordnance Survey and Griffith's Valuation, under which only an English-language name had official status. Irish-language names were adopted in place of some English-language names after 1920 (e.g. King's County became Laois, and Kells, County Meath became Ceannanus Mór) and the Department of Posts and Telegraphs adopted Irish names, but these were ad-hoc and sometimes inconsistent or disputed by locals or Irish-language scholars.

The Place-Names (Irish Forms) Act 1973 codified the official assignment of Irish names alongside, rather than instead of, English names; in 1975 the first statutory instrument made this act gave official Irish names to post towns. The names chosen were on the advice of the Placenames Branch; some differed from those adopted in previous decades, in some cases causing controversy. Responsibility for place names was transferred from the Department of Finance to the Department of Arts, Heritage, Gaeltacht and the Islands in 2000. The 1973 Act was replaced by the Official Languages Act 2003 and under its terms, the Placenames Committee continues to advise the Minister prior to the issuing of statutory instruments.

The Placenames Commission ceased on 11 October 2012 and the Placenames Committee (Irish: an Coiste Logainmneacha) took its place on 19 September 2013. The Placenames Branch (Irish: An Brainse Logainmneacha) is a branch of the Department of Culture, Communications and Sport, established by the Official Languages Act 2003, which supports the Placenames Commission/Committee in investigating the historical Irish-language names of places.

== Awards ==
The official website used to access the database, www.logainm.ie, won the European Language Label in 2010 and was category winner at the 2011 and 2016 Irish eGovernment Awards.

== See also ==
- Ainmean-Àite na h-Alba, Scottish Gaelic equivalent
