= List of Welsh areas by percentage of Welsh-speakers =

Overview of Welsh-speaking areas in Wales

This is a list of subdivisions of Wales by the percentage of those professing some skills in the Welsh language in the 2011 UK census. The census did not record Welsh-speakers living outside Wales.

The census determined that 18.56% of the population could speak Welsh and 14.57% could speak, read and write in the language. In the most recent census in 2021, 17.8% reported being able to speak Welsh.

== Census breakdown ==
The Census produced a detailed breakdown of skills as:

- Understands spoken Welsh (no other skills)
- Speaks but does not read or write Welsh
- Speaks and reads but does not write Welsh
- Speaks, reads and writes Welsh
- Other combination of skills; e.g. Can read but not speak.
- No knowledge of Welsh.

== Those with the ability to speak Welsh ==
Percentages of Welsh speakers in the principal areas of Wales according to the 2011 census

The second table includes only those people who stated in the 2011 Census that they are able to speak the Welsh language. It was these statistics that were reported by the press when the first data samples were released in 2012.

List of principal areas by Welsh speakers
Area	Able to speak Welsh	Unable to speak Welsh	Population total	% of those who can speak Welsh	% of those unable to speak Welsh
Blaenau Gwent	5,316	64,498	69,814	7.61%	92.39%
Bridgend	13,223	125,955	139,178	9.50%	90.50%
Caerphilly	19,448	159,358	178,806	10.88%	89.12%
Cardiff	37,194	308,896	346,090	10.75%	89.25%
Carmarthenshire	78,914	104,863	183,777	42.94%	57.06%
Ceredigion	34,964	40,958	75,922	47.35%	52.65%
Conwy	30,933	84,295	115,228	26.85%	73.15%
Denbighshire	22,491	71,243	93,734	23.99%	76.01%
Flintshire	19,463	133,043	152,506	12.76%	87.24%
Gwynedd	78,412	43,462	121,874	64.34%	35.66%
Isle of Anglesey	39,129	30,622	69,751	56.10%	43.90%
Merthyr Tydfil	5,083	53,719	58,802	8.64%	91.36%
Monmouthshire	8,831	82,492	91,323	9.67%	90.33%
Neath Port Talbot	20,843	118,969	139,812	14.91%	85.09%
Newport	13,124	132,612	145,736	9.01%	90.99%
Pembrokeshire	23,016	99,423	122,439	18.80%	81.20%
Powys	24,187	108,789	132,976	18.19%	81.81%
Rhondda Cynon Taf	28,123	206,287	234,410	12.00%	88.00%
Swansea	26,532	212,491	239,023	11.10%	88.90%
The Vale of Glamorgan	13,325	113,011	126,336	10.55%	89.45%
Torfaen	8,704	82,371	91,075	9.56%	90.44%
Wrexham	16,805	118,039	134,844	12.46%	87.54%
Totals	576,462	2,494,956	3,063,456	18.56%	81.44%

== Those with knowledge of the Welsh language ==
For the purpose of the first table, all combinations other than "no knowledge of Welsh" have been combined, giving a percentage of people that state they have some communication skills in the Welsh language rather than an ability to speak Welsh. The totals include children whose parents have filled in the Census details on this behalf.

List of principal areas by people with some communication skills in the Welsh language
Area	Can communicate in Welsh	No knowledge of Welsh	Population total	% of those who have some knowledge of Welsh	% of those who have no knowledge of Welsh
Blaenau Gwent	7,808	62,006	69,814	11.18%	88.82%
Bridgend	23,532	115,646	139,178	16.91%	83.09%
Caerphilly	28,059	150,747	178,806	15.69%	84.31%
Cardiff	54,504	291,586	346,090	15.74%	84.25%
Carmarthenshire	105,032	78,745	183,777	57.15%	42.85%
Ceredigion	43,366	32,556	75,922	57.12%	42.88%
Conwy	44,614	70,614	115,228	38.72%	61.28%
Denbighshire	32,528	61,206	93,734	34.70%	65.30%
Flintshire	30,455	122,051	152,506	19.97%	80.03%
Gwynedd	88,853	33,021	121,874	72.91%	27.09%
Isle of Anglesey	47,821	21,930	69,751	68.56%	31.44%
Merthyr Tydfil	8,640	50,162	58,802	14.69%	85.31%
Monmouthshire	12,500	78,823	91,323	13.69%	86.31%
Neath Port Talbot	33,896	105,916	139,812	24.24%	75.76%
Newport	18,490	127,246	145,736	12.69%	87.31%
Pembrokeshire	32,930	89,509	122,439	26.90%	73.10%
Powys	36,602	96,374	132,976	27.53%	72.47%
Rhondda Cynon Taf	44,911	189,499	234,410	19.16%	80.84%
Swansea	45,085	193,938	239,023	18.86%	81.14%
Vale of Glamorgan	20,093	106,243	126,336	15.90%	84.10%
Torfaen	11,950	79,125	91,075	13.12%	86.88%
Wrexham	27,812	107,032	134,844	20.63%	79.37%
Totals	799,481	2,263,975	3,063,456	26.10%	73.90%

== Annual Population Survey estimates ==
In addition to official Census data, the Annual Population Survey publishes sample-based estimates on the number of self-proclaimed Welsh speakers several times a year based on estimates for the previous year. The third table displays uses this data to show estimates for the percentage of people who say they can speak Welsh at the time of each survey, from June 2016 onwards. The 2020 survey reported that 28.6% of people in Wales aged three and over were able to speak Welsh.

List of principal areas by Welsh speakers (%) (2016–17)
Area	% Jun 2016	% Sep 2016	% Dec 2016	% Mar 2017	% Jun 2017	% July 2019
Blaenau Gwent	17.4	17.3	16.6	17.2	16.7	19.7
Bridgend	16.4	16.9	17.6	18.4	17.9	15.6
Caerphilly	24.1	23.2	22.2	20.9	21.2	23.7
Cardiff	15.5	16.5	17.9	18.9	19.5	23.7
Carmarthenshire	46.9	48.8	50.0	50.8	50.5	53.3
Ceredigion	53.8	55.3	55.8	56.1	56.6	59.6
Conwy	35.1	35.7	37.9	39.6	39.5	41.6
Denbighshire	35.0	36.2	36.7	35.4	39.5	37.3
Flintshire	21.1	20.2	19.6	19.2	19.7	23.1
Gwynedd	71.1	71.3	71.1	71.8	71.1	76.4
Isle of Anglesey	63.3	61.9	61.9	61.6	60.8	67.5
Merthyr Tydfil	20.8	19.4	19.5	20.5	22.0	18.5
Monmouthshire	15.7	15.6	16.4	16.3	16.9	17.6
Neath Port Talbot	21.7	22.4	21.9	21.2	21.7	25.3
Newport	18.9	18.4	18.7	19.0	19.6	20.9
Pembrokeshire	27.1	27.9	28.0	29.2	29.7	29.6
Powys	25.9	26.8	26.3	27.3	26.7	29.9
Rhondda Cynon Taf	20.8	21.3	22.8	23.6	23.2	22.3
Swansea	21.4	22.1	21.4	22.1	22.5	23.1
Torfaen	18.2	15.6	16.9	17.7	18.8	17.7
The Vale of Glamorgan	18.2	19.2	18.4	19.3	19.2	20.9
Wrexham	27.7	27.5	27.2	26.0	25.0	25.8
Wales	26.7	27.1	27.4	27.8	27.9	29.8

=== Annual Population Survey data: Percentages of residents aged 3 and over who can understand spoken Welsh ===
June 2023–June 2024
In each principal area
(all residents)

In each principal area
(Welsh-born residents)

In each Senedd constituency (left) and electoral region (right)
(all residents)

In each Senedd constituency (left) and electoral region (right)
(Welsh-born residents)

Key

10–20%
20–30%
30–40%
40–50%
50–60%
60–70%
70–80%
80–90%
90–100%

== See also ==
- Irish language in Northern Ireland
- List of Scottish council areas by number of Scottish Gaelic speakers
- List of Welsh principal areas
