= Gaeltacht Act 2012 =

Act of the Oireachtas (Irish parliament)

Oireachtas
- Long title: An Act to designate Gaeltacht Language Planning Areas, Gaeltacht Service Towns and Irish Language Networks; to amend the Ministers and Secretaries (Amendment) Act 1956; to amend the Údarás na Gaeltachta Act 1979; to amend the Electoral Act 1992; to amend the Electoral Act 1997; and to provide for related matters
- Citation: No. 34 of 2012
- Signed: 25 July 2012
- Commenced: Ss. 14–25, on enactment Ss. 1–13 16 April 2013

Legislative history
- Bill citation: No. 53 of 2012
- Introduced by: Minister for Arts, Heritage and the Gaeltacht (Jimmy Deenihan)
- Introduced: 19 June 2012

Keywords
- Gaeltacht

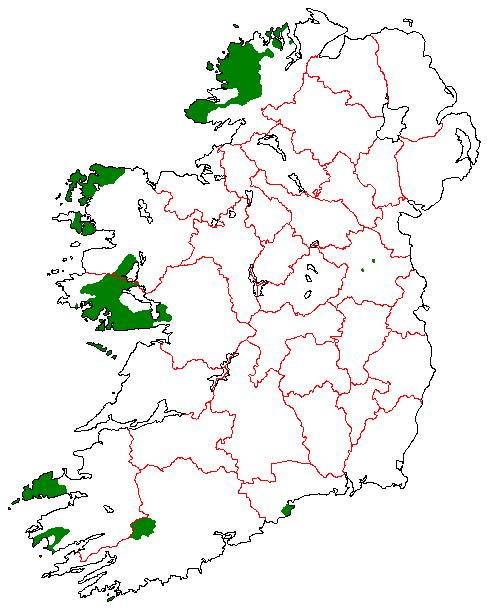
A map of the current official Gaeltacht areas in Ireland in 2021

The Gaeltacht Act 2012 (Irish: Acht na Gaeltachta 2012) is an Act of the Oireachtas of Ireland. The Act redefined the traditional Irish-speaking areas or Gaeltacht in Ireland on linguistic criteria instead of on geographic areas which had been the position until 2012. While the traditional Gaeltacht boundaries still exist, the Act sets out ways where areas outside the Gaeltacht can be formally designated as Irish Language Networks (Irish: Líonraí Gaeilge) and Gaeltacht Service Towns (Irish: Bailte Seirbhíse Gaeltachta).

In 2016 it was announced that Galway City, Dingle and Letterkenny would be the first recognised Gaeltacht Service Towns, subject to them adopting and implementing approved language plans. In February 2018 the Department of Arts, Heritage and the Gaeltacht and Foras na Gaeilge announced that five areas - West Belfast, Loughrea, Carn Tóchair, Ennis and Clondalkin Village - were going to be designated as having the first formal Irish Language Networks. Foras na Gaeilge have said that they expect the status to be given to other areas.

The Act also brought the process of the introduction of Language Plans in the Gaeltacht into existence and gave statutory effect to the implementation of the 20-Year Strategy for the Irish Language 2010–2030 by Údarás na Gaeltachta in the Gaeltacht and changed the process by which the board of Údarás na Gaeltachta was elected.

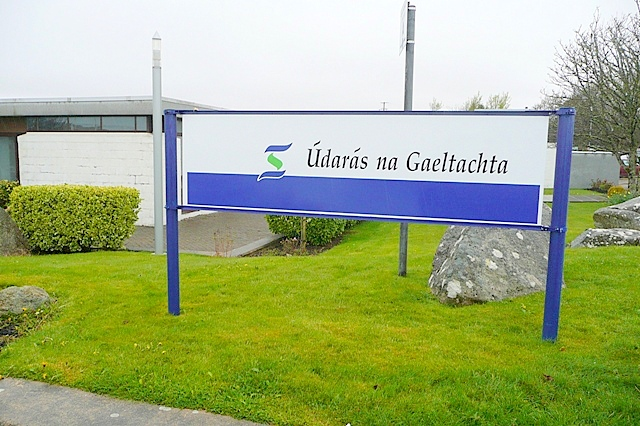
Údarás na Gaeltachta are responsible for the implementation of the Gaeltacht Act 2012 in the Gaeltacht including the Bailte Seirbhíse Gaeltachta and they also oversee the implementation of the 20-Year Strategy for the Irish Language 2010–2030 in the Gaeltacht

== See also ==
- Official Languages Act 2003
- Irish language outside Ireland
- Scottish Gaelic Gaeilge na hAlban / Gàidhlig na h-Alba.
- Gàidhealtachd Scottish Gaelic speaking regions in Scotland.
