= List of Scottish council areas by number of Scottish Gaelic speakers =

This is a list of council areas of Scotland ordered by the number of Scottish Gaelic speakers in the 2022 census.

Rank	Council area	Speakers	Population	Percentage(%)	Main (Home) Language Speakers	Percentage(%)
1	Highland	12,040	229,631	5.2	682	0.3
2	Na h-Eileanan Siar	11,486	25,563	44.9	1,761	6.9
3	Glasgow City	8,972	603,203	1.5	369	0.1
4	City of Edinburgh	4,628	501,268	0.9	120	0.0
5	Argyll and Bute	3,159	84,097	3.8	77	0.1
6	Aberdeenshire	2,945	256,378	1.1	31	0.0
7	North Lanarkshire	2,469	331,130	0.7	46	0.0
8	Aberdeen City	2,219	217,756	1.0	55	0.0
9	Fife	2,111	362,139	0.6	34	0.0
10	South Lanarkshire	2,109	317,755	0.7	37	0.0
11	Perth and Kinross	1,571	147,257	1.1	19	0.0
12	Renfrewshire	1,433	178,873	0.8	32	0.0
13	Falkirk	1,210	154,078	0.8	28	0.0
14	West Lothian	1,148	175,963	0.7	21	0.0
15	East Dunbartonshire	1,039	106,057	1.0	34	0.0
16	Dundee City	990	144,799	0.7	19	0.0
17	Stirling	903	90,447	1.0	27	0.0
18	Dumfries and Galloway	879	142,503	0.6	15	0.0
19	North Ayrshire	874	130,130	0.7	9	0.0
20	East Ayrshire	836	116,962	0.7	17	0.0
21	Moray	823	90,787	0.9	5	0.0
22	East Renfrewshire	740	94,174	0.8	31	0.0
23	South Ayrshire	712	109,034	0.7	9	0.0
24	Angus	703	111,587	0.6	8	0.0
25	West Dunbartonshire	684	86,076	0.8	22	0.0
26	Scottish Borders	679	114,114	0.6	7	0.0
27	East Lothian	634	109,095	0.6	15	0.0
28	Midlothian	554	93,257	0.6	6	0.0
29	Inverclyde	531	76,544	0.7	3	0.0
30	Clackmannanshire	403	50,404	0.8	5	0.0
31	Orkney	143	21,400	0.7	0	0.0
32	Shetland	113	22,408	0.5	4	0.0

== See also ==
- Irish language in Northern Ireland
- List of Welsh areas by percentage of Welsh-speakers
