= Irish language network =

Formally designated Irish language-relevant areas

An Irish Language Network (Irish: Líonra Gaeilge pl. Líonraí Gaeilge) is a designation applicable to areas in both jurisdictions on the island of Ireland.

== History ==
The Gaeltacht Act 2012 (in the Republic of Ireland) allowed for the designation by the cross-border body Foras na Gaeilge and the Irish Department of Media, Tourism, Arts, Culture, Sport and the Gaeltacht of certain areas as Irish Language Networks (Líonraí Gaeilge) outside the traditional Irish-speaking areas collectively known as the Gaeltacht. The designation recognises a certain level of community and State support for the Irish language, and is made by electoral division or settlement name. The designation is to be made where the commitment to the Irish language seems strong enough to justify it, and can be revoked if language plans are not followed-through successfully.

In February 2018, Foras na Gaeilge announced that five areas – West Belfast, Loughrea, Carn Tóchair (ga), Ennis and Clondalkin Village – were designated as having the first Irish Language Networks, subject to the committees in the networks co-formulating and adopting approved Irish language plans which are since in place. Foras na Gaeilge have said that they expect to also designate other areas outside the Gaeltacht as Irish Language Networks, although as of early 2025, no new designations have been made.

== See also ==
- Gaeltacht Irish speaking regions in Ireland
- Bailte Seirbhíse Gaeltachta Gaeltacht Service Towns
- Neo-Gaeltacht
- Irish language in Northern Ireland
- Irish language outside Ireland
- Scottish Gaelic Gaeilge na hAlban / Gàidhlig na h-Alba.
- Gàidhealtachd Scots Gaelic speaking regions in Scotland.
