= Gaeltacht Service Town =

State designation of selected urban areas in Ireland

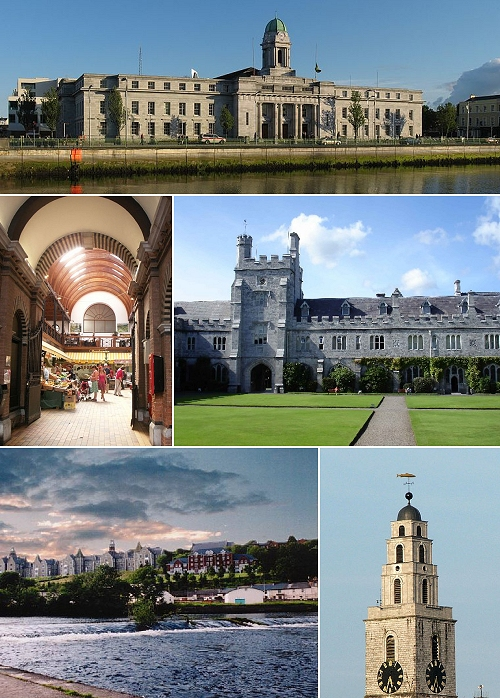
Cork City

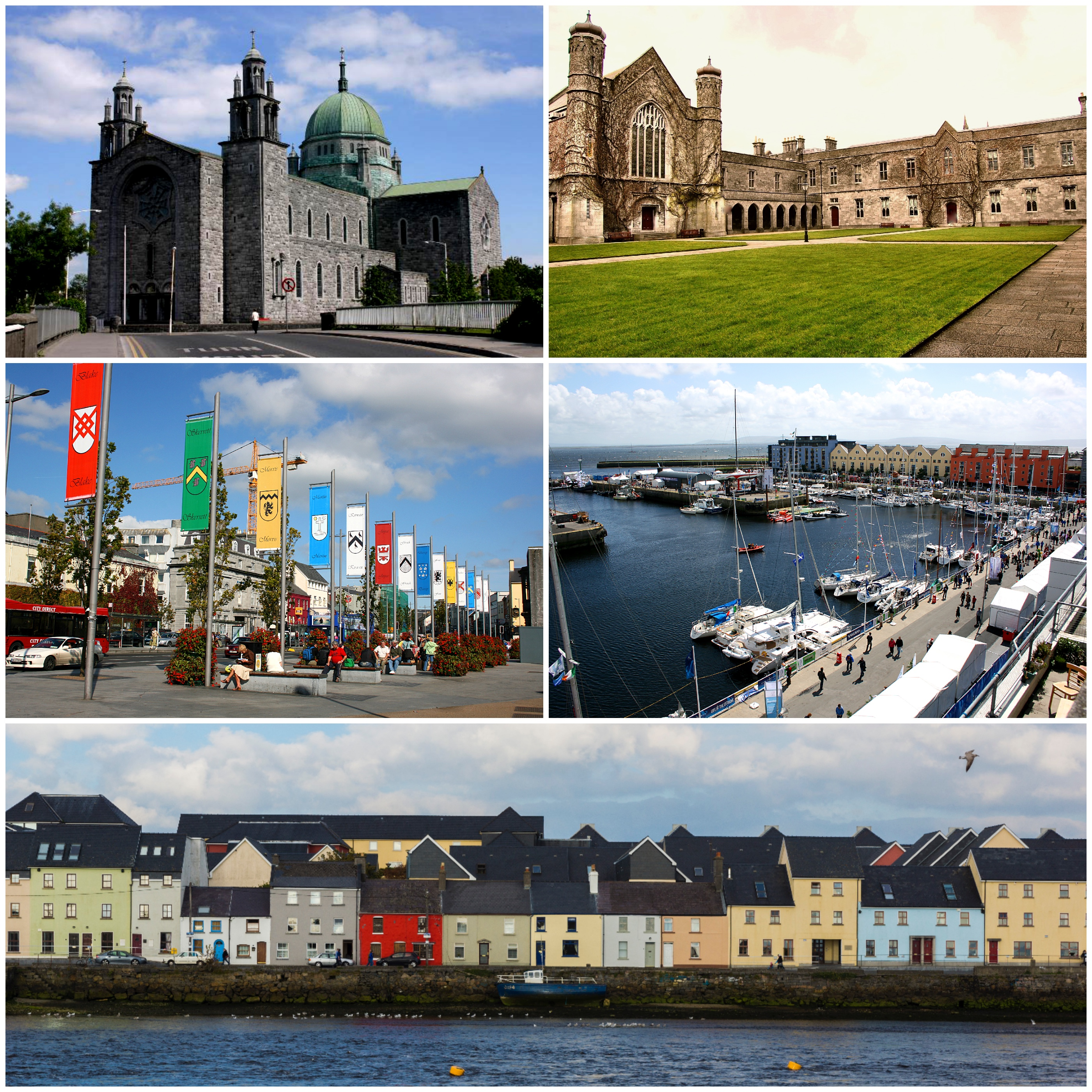
Galway City

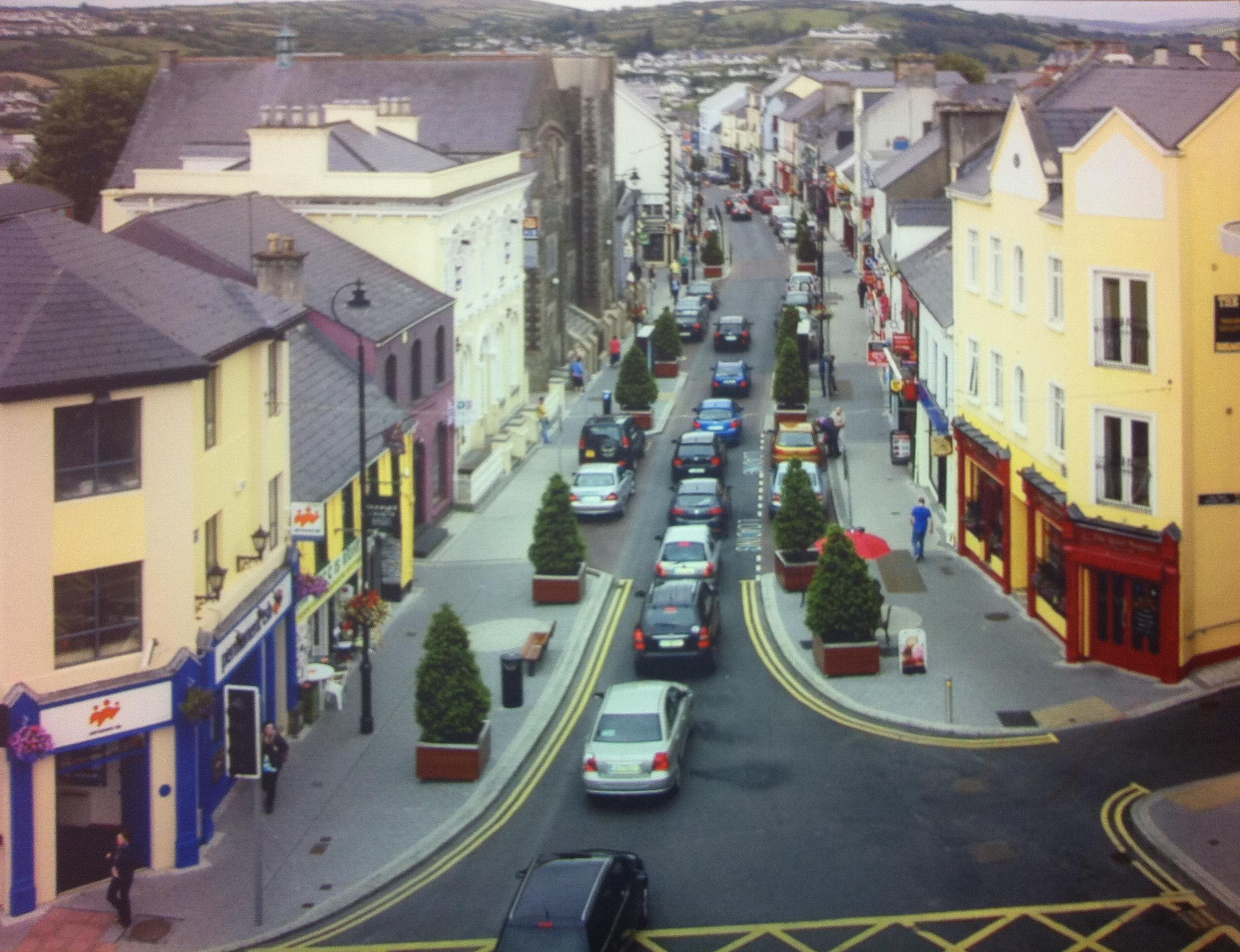
Letterkenny, County Donegal

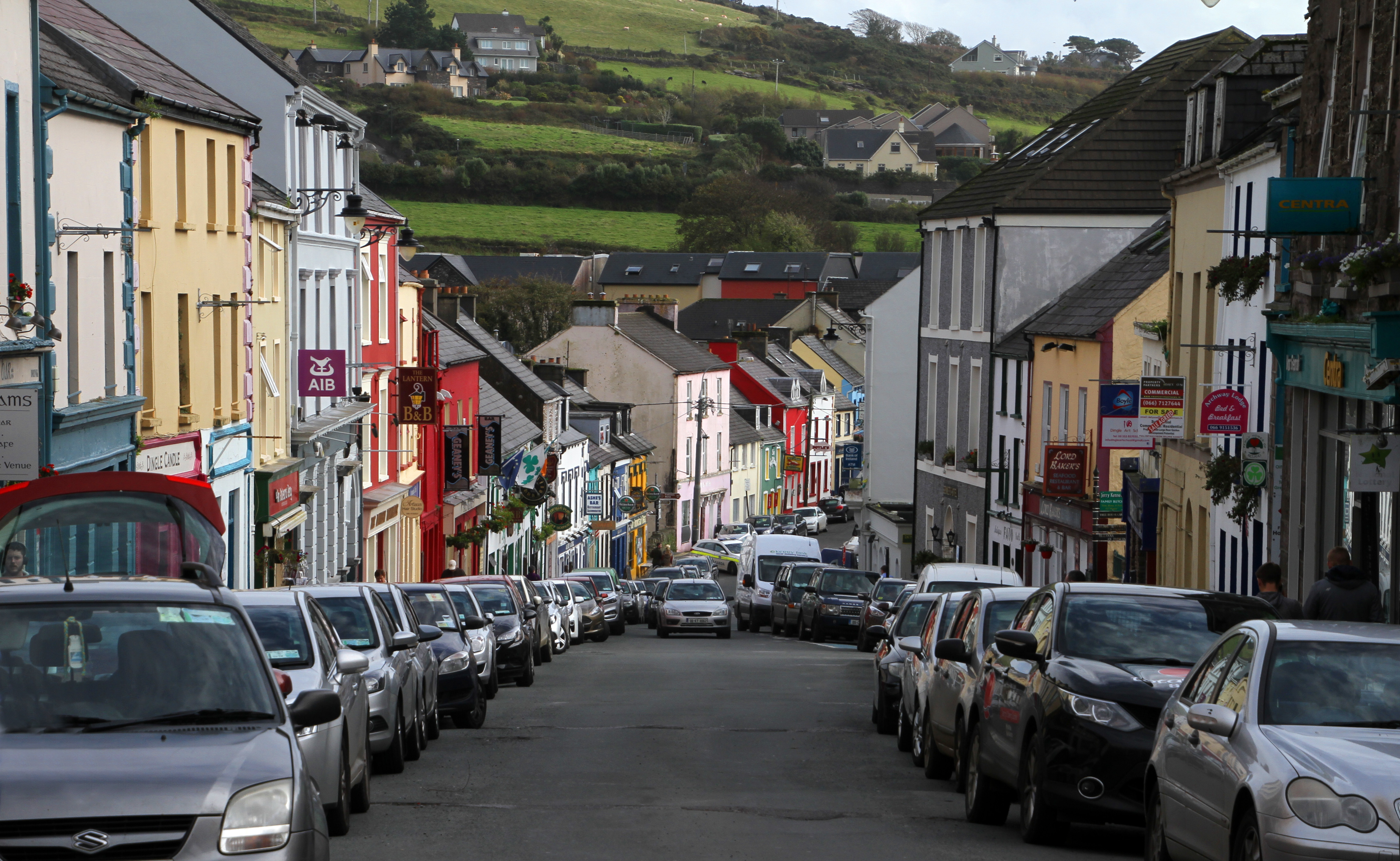
Dingle, County Kerry

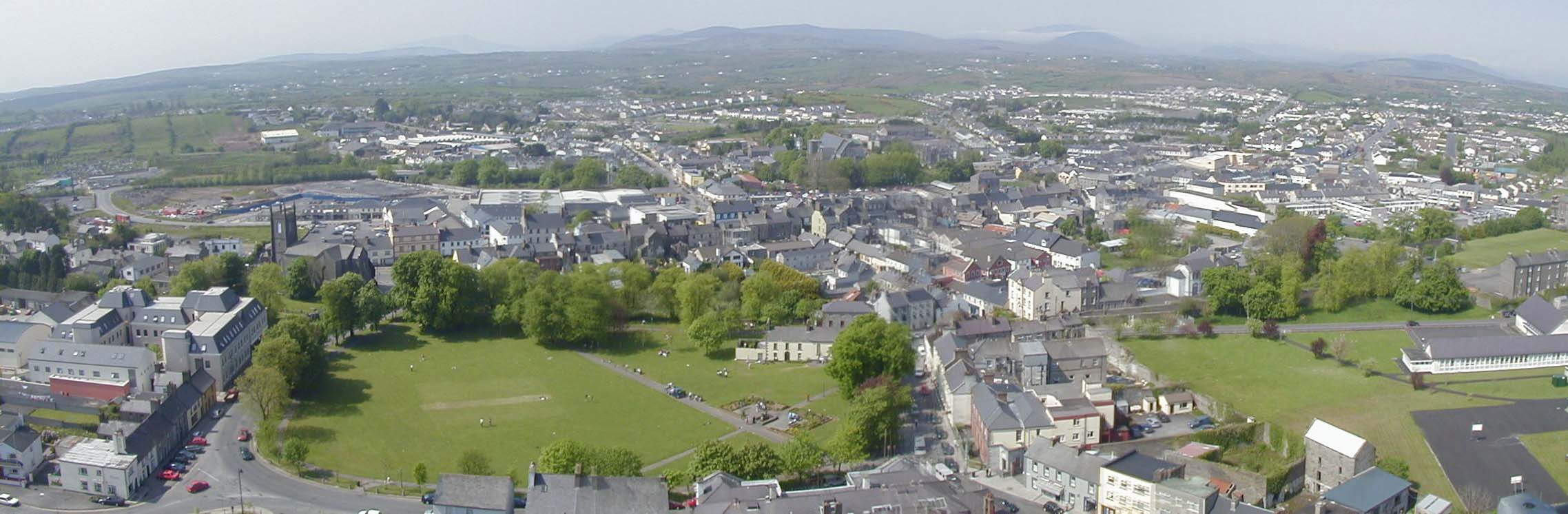
Castlebar, Co. Mayo

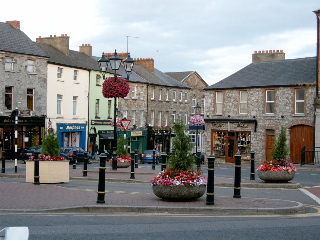
Navan, Co. Meath.

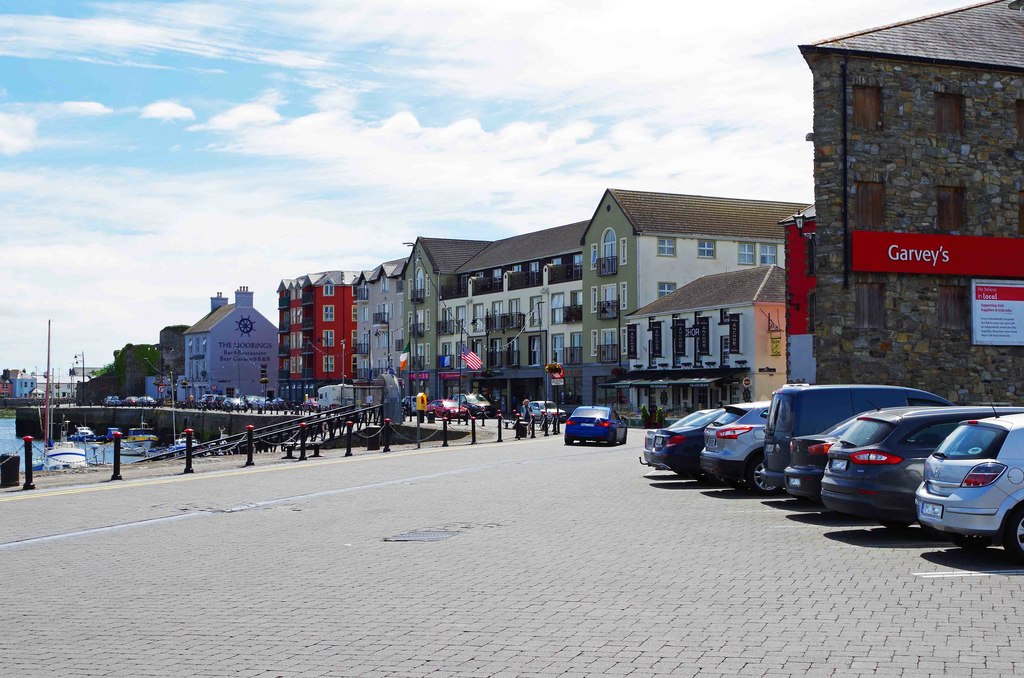
Dungarvan, Co. Waterford

A Gaeltacht Service Town (Irish: Baile Seirbhíse Gaeltachta pl. Bailte Seirbhíse Gaeltachta) is an area designated under the Gaeltacht Act 2012, situated in or adjacent to Gaeltacht areas in Ireland, that have a population of over 1,000 people, and which play a significant role in providing public services, recreational and commercial facilities for Gaeltacht residents.

== History ==
In 2016 it was announced that Galway City, Dingle and Letterkenny would be the first designated Gaeltacht Service Towns subject to local networks co-formulating and adopting approved Irish language plans in conjunction with Foras na Gaeilge and Údarás na Gaeltachta. Údarás na Gaeltachta fund Gaeltacht Service Towns plans within the Gaeltacht and Foras na Gaeilge fund the plans in the towns outside of the Gaeltacht.

In August 2020, the Department of Rural and Community Development and the Gaeltacht recognised Dingle and Letterkenny as the first two Gaeltacht Service Towns.

There are now 16 Gaeltacht Service Towns including Cork City, Galway City and Letterkenny – and the others being – Clifden, Athboy, Navan, Ballinrobe, Castlebar, Belmullet, Donegal Town, Dingle, Dungloe, Dungarvan, Macroom, Tralee and Cahersiveen.

== See also ==
- Údarás na Gaeltachta
- Foras na Gaeilge
- Líonraí Gaeilge
- Irish language outside Ireland
- Scottish Gaelic
