= An Coimisinéir Teanga =

Irish government appointee

- Incumbent; Séamas Ó Concheanainn since 2023
- Appointer: President of Ireland on the nomination of the Government of Ireland
- Formation: 2004
- Website: www.coimisineir.ie

An Coimisinéir Teanga ('The Language Commissioner') is an office created by the Official Languages Act 2003 in Ireland to promote and safeguard the respective language rights of Irish and English speakers in Ireland. The Coimisinéir is appointed by the President of Ireland.

== Role ==
The Coimisinéir's job is mainly to "police" the articles of the Act, which gives legislative force to the Irish Constitution's definition of Irish as the country's "first official Language" and English as the "second official language". The Coimisinéir's office develops language plans for public bodies to ensure that they fulfill their responsibilities to speakers of both official languages. Private bodies are not officially included in the Act but it makes provisions for extending the Act's applicability in the future.

== Commissioners ==
- Seán Ó Cuirreáin, 2004–2014
- Rónán Ó Domhnaill, 2014–2023
- Séamas Ó Concheanainn, 2023-present

== See also ==
- Irish language Commissioner, a similar office in Northern Ireland
- Office of the Commissioner of Official Languages
- Office québécois de la langue française
- Welsh Language Commissioner
- Māori Language Commission
- Bòrd na Gàidhlig
