= Foras na Gaeilge =

All-Ireland public body for the promotion of Irish

- Formation: 2 December 1999; 26 years ago
- Type: Executive agency
- Legal status: Intergovernmental implementation body
- Headquarters: Dublin and Belfast
- Region served: Ireland
- Official language: Irish
- CEO: Seán Ó Coinn
- Main organ: Board of directors
- Parent organisation: The North/South Language Body
- Staff: 57
- Website: Foras na Gaeilge

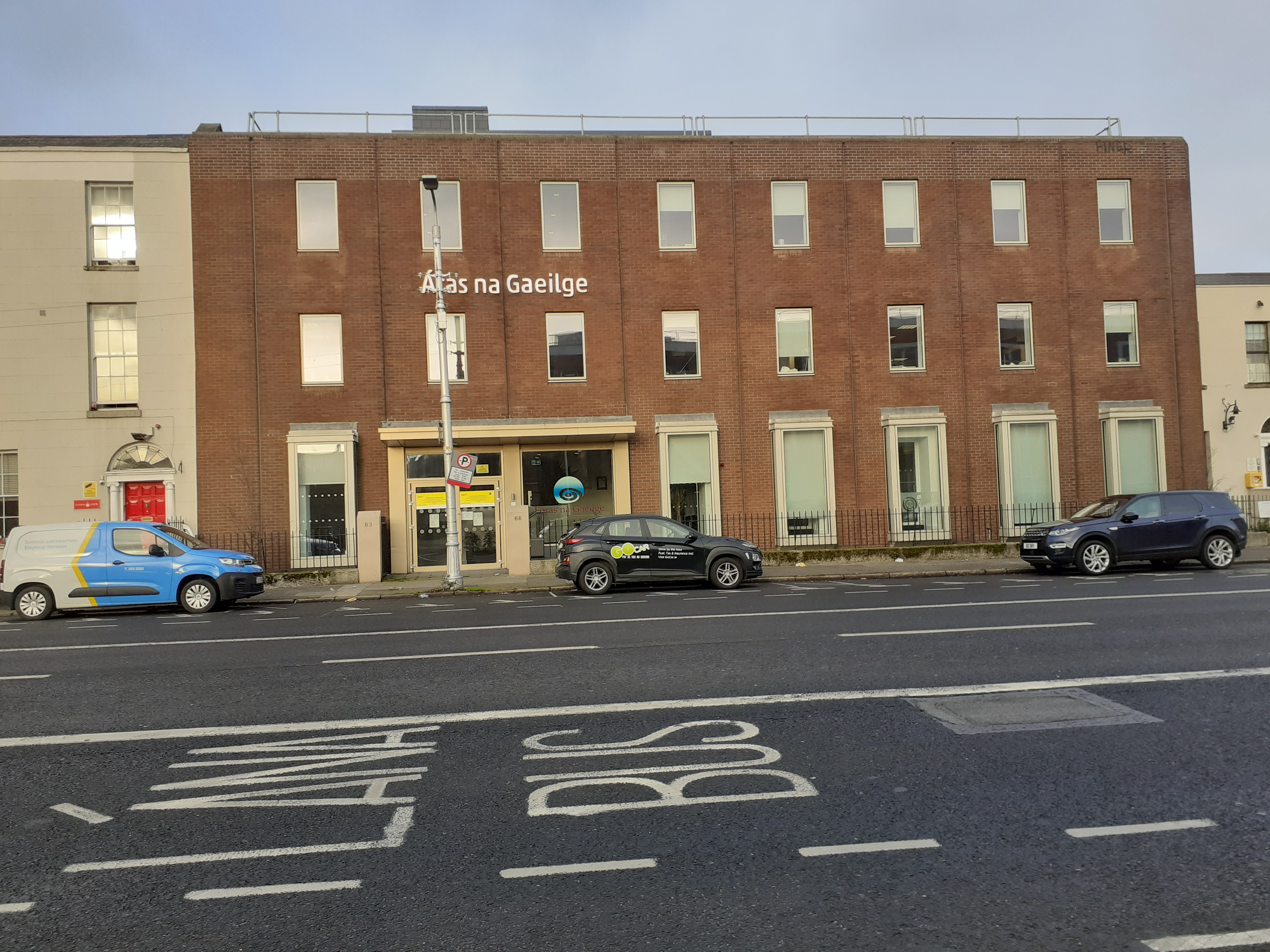
Since 2017 the headquarters of Foras na Gaeilge is situated in Áras na Gaeilge on Amiens Street in Dublin. Raidió na Life is also based in the áras.

Foras na Gaeilge ([ˈfˠɔɾˠəsˠ n̪ˠə ˈɡeːlʲɟə], "Irish Institute"; FnaG) is a public body responsible for the promotion of the Irish language throughout the island of Ireland, including both the Republic of Ireland and Northern Ireland. It was set up on 2 December 1999, assuming the roles of the Irish language board Bord na Gaeilge (including the book distributor Áisíneacht Dáiliúchan Leabhar), the publisher An Gúm, and the terminological committee An Coiste Téarmaíochta, all three of which had formerly been state bodies of the Irish government.

== Functions ==
- Promotion of the Irish language;
- Facilitating and encouraging its use in speech and writing in public and private life in the Republic of Ireland and, in the context of Part III of the European Charter for Regional or Minority Languages, in Northern Ireland where there is appropriate demand;
- Advising both administrations, public bodies and other groups in the private and voluntary sectors;
- Undertaking supportive projects, and grant-aiding bodies and groups as considered necessary;
- Undertaking research, promotional campaigns, and public and media relations;
- Developing terminology and dictionaries;
- Supporting Irish-medium education and the teaching of Irish.

The North South Ministerial Council (NSMC) was established under the Belfast/Good Friday Agreement (1998), to develop consultation, co-operation and action within the island of Ireland. The Language Body (consisting of two agencies i.e. Foras na Gaeilge and the Ulster-Scots Agency) was one of six North South Implementation Bodies which were set up and operate on an all-island basis. While having a clear operational remit, all operate under the overall policy direction of the North South Ministerial Council, with clear accountability lines back to the council and to the Oireachtas and the Northern Ireland Assembly.

== Publications ==
The Irish-language publisher An Gúm, established by the Irish Free State, became part of Foras na Gaeilge in 1999. Educational materials in Irish and dictionaries continue to be produced.

Saol (meaning 'life'), also known as Saol na Gaeilge, was a free Irish-language monthly newspaper that was funded by Foras na Gaeilge. First published in 1988 and based in Dublin, as of 2001 it was edited by Colm Ó Torna.

== See also ==
- Irish language in Northern Ireland
- European Charter for Regional or Minority Languages
- British-Irish Council
- Languages in the United Kingdom
- Language revival
- Bòrd na Gàidhlig (Scotland)
- An Coimisinéir Teanga
