= One to One (TV series) =

- Genre: Interview
- Presented by: Richard Crowley; Paul Cunningham; Bryan Dobson; Aine Lawlor; George Lee; Cathal Mac Coille; John Murray
- Country of origin: Ireland
- Original language: English
- No. of series: 4
- No. of episodes: 42

Original release
- Network: RTÉ One
- Release: 1 October 2006 – 28 January 2013

One to One is an Irish television series which airs on RTÉ One. Since the first edition was broadcast at 12:15pm on 1 October 2006, the programme has featured personal interviews with a well-known figure from Ireland and abroad, one per episode. The second series moved to a Monday slot, beginning on 1 October 2007. A third series was broadcast during the summer months of June and July 2008. The fourth series aired from 10 November 2008 to 16 March 2009.

Series presenters included Aine Lawlor, Bryan Dobson, George Lee, Richard Crowley, Paul Cunningham, John Murray and Cathal Mac Coille. Guests to have featured in the series include Hans Blix, Michael Smurfit, Michael Colgan, Ben Dunne, clergymen Diarmuid Martin and Peter Sutherland, Ulick McEvaddy, T. K. Whitaker, Seymour Hersh, Alan Johnston, Ruth Bader Ginsburg, Seán FitzPatrick, Roy Foster, Samantha Power, Declan Ganley and Jeffrey Sachs. Each edition was typically approximately forty minutes length in total, with all the interviews available to watch online at RTÉ.ie.

== Episodes ==
=== Series one ===
The first episode featured an interview by Lawlor with Diarmuid Martin, the Roman Catholic Archbishop of Dublin. Martin spoke on a range of topics such as his early life in Ballyfermot, County Dublin, his opinion on Ireland following thirty years he spent with the Pope in Rome, his relationships with both Pope John Paul II and Pope Benedict XVI, and other topics which have affected the Roman Catholic Church, such as clerical sexual abuse, celibacy, the ordination of women as priests and contraception versus AIDS. The second episode featured an interview by Crowley with Nickey Brennan, the president of the Gaelic Athletic Association (GAA). Brennan spoke of the GAA's plans for pay-per-view deals, the improvement of disciplinary rules within the sport, the possibility that some inter county competitions might be discontinued, the GAA's possible recognition of the Gaelic Players Association and his opposition to the idea of professionalism within what is primarily an amateur organisation. The third episode featured an interview by Dobson with Ombudsman and Information Commissioner Emily O'Reilly, who deals with complaints against state institutions. She spoke of her pity for those she viewed as the marginalised members of society, directing her frustration at Ireland's Health Service Executive (HSE) for not dealing with such complaints appropriately. O'Reilly also spoke of her hopes that her office would be expanded to take into account HSE-related complaints, as well as complaints directed at the Garda Síochána and her desire to serve a second term.

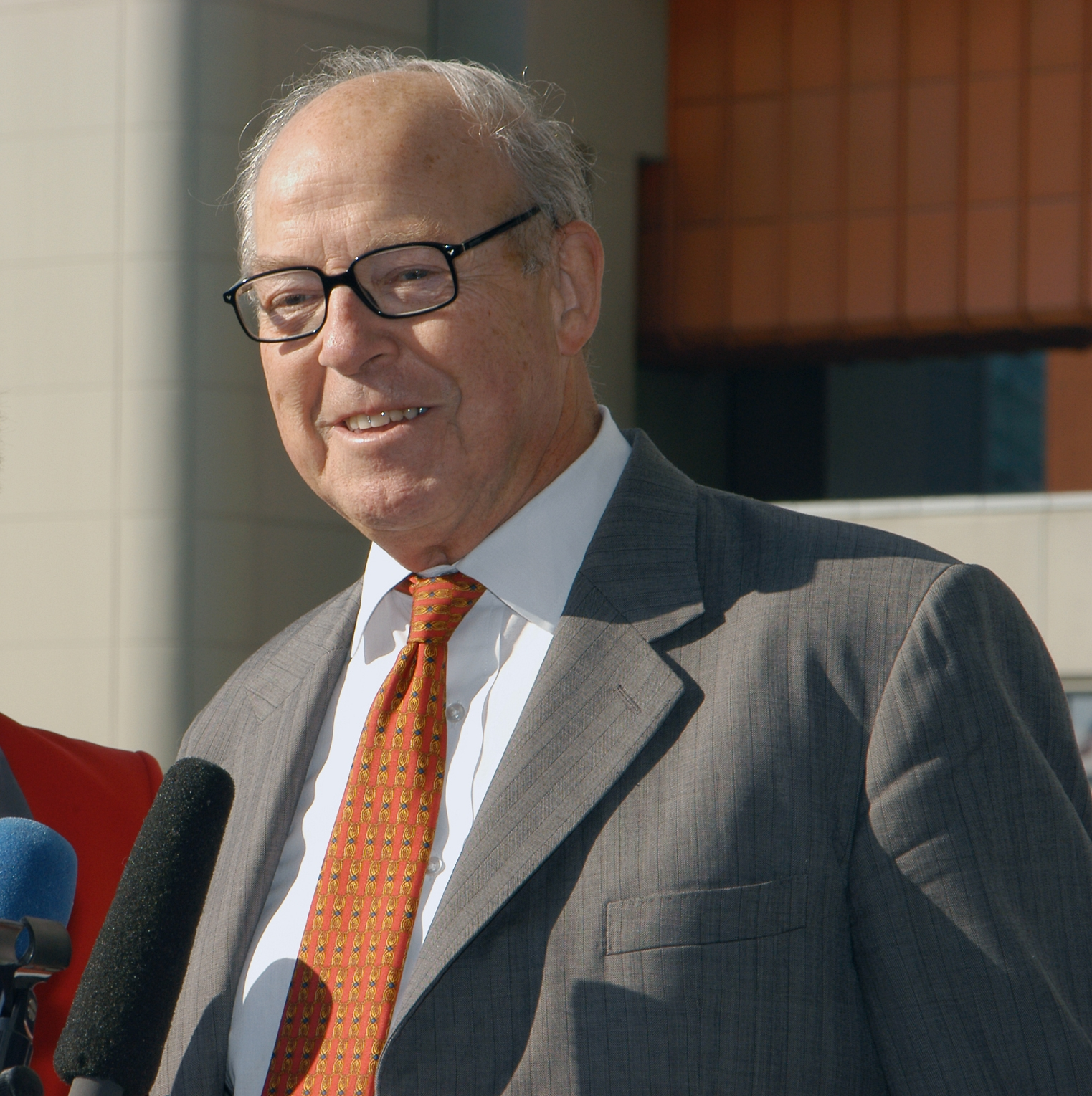
Hans Blix (pictured above) spoke of his relationships with politicians such as George W. Bush and Tony Blair.

The fourth episode featured an interview by Crowley with the former Director General of the United Nations Monitoring, Verification and Inspection Commission in Iraq and Chairman of the Weapons of Mass Destruction Commission, Hans Blix. He spoke of his belief that, had weapons inspections in Iraq been permitted to continue for another two months, it would have been harder for the then US president, George W. Bush to justify his invasion of that country and that the United Kingdom may not have allied itself with the US in the Iraq War. Blix also spoke, amongst other things, of his relationships with Bush and the prime minister of the United Kingdom, Tony Blair, his opinions on Iran and the Middle East, his fears of nuclear, biological and chemical weapons; global warming and the attitude of the US towards the United Nations. The fifth episode featured an interview by Lawlor with the Director of the Economic and Social Research Institute, Frances P. Ruane. The sixth episode featured an interview by Dobson with the consultant cardiac surgeon, Maurice Neligan. Neligan spoke about the Hanly plan to rationalise Ireland's public hospitals, the growth of private facilities, consultants working simultaneously in both private and public medicine, and the reported lack of transparency when investigating claims of negligence against members of the medical profession. He also criticised a proposal to close hospitals in Ennis, Monaghan, Nenagh and Roscommon.

The seventh episode featured an interview by Lee with the billionaire businessman, Michael Smurfit. Smurfit, who brought the Ryder Cup competition to the K Club, County Kildare in 2006, spoke of his father being refused membership at several Dublin golf courses in the 1950s because they mistakenly believed him to be Jewish. This discrimination, he said, served as motivation for Smurfit to expand his family business into a worldwide organisation with annual profits of €7 billion which employs 40,000 people. Smurfit also spoke of Ireland's economic growth and the controversy over a land deal which led to an intervention by the then Taoiseach, Charles Haughey who asked him to resign as Chairman of Telecom Éireann after thirteen years in that position. The eighth episode featured an interview by Lawlor with the Artistic Director of the Gate Theatre in Dublin, Michael Colgan. He spoke of first meeting his hero, the playwright Samuel Beckett ("like meeting John Lennon") in Paris in 1986. Colgan and Alan Moloney, his business partner, eventually committed all nineteen of Beckett's plays onto film in 2001 in a joint project for RTÉ, Channel 4 and the Irish Film Board. Colgan also spoke of his 23-year tenure as artistic director of the Gate Theatre, his relationship with the Abbey Theatre and his feuds – with the Arts Council of Ireland over funding and with the playwright, Tom Murphy, which he later regretted. The ninth episode featured an interview by Crowley with Ben Dunne, businessman. Dunne spoke of his friendship with Charles Haughey, his decision to gift Haughey over £1 million but not to attend his funeral, his cocaine addiction which led to him being arrested in Florida on drugs-related charges and his infamous 1980s kidnapping by republican gunmen in Northern Ireland.

The tenth episode featured an interview by Dobson with the Director of the charity Trócaire, Justin Kilcullen. He spoke of the 2004 Asian tsunami, Ethiopia and the continent of Africa, airing his belief that it has "gone backwards" within the space of two decades. Kilculln also spoke of the agency's Catholic ethos and how this presents difficulty when it comes to working against HIV/Aids, since the Church's despises contraception. The eleventh episode features an interview by Crowley with Theo Dorgan, a poet, broadcaster and member of the Arts Council of Ireland. He spoke of his early life in Cork, his attendance at University College Cork, his involvement in the Cork Film Festival, the alleged snobbery associated with the Arts and his belief that the Irish Government-funded Arts Council needed to do more to promote the Arts than simply "hand out money". The twelfth episode featured an interview by Lee with former Attorney General and European Commissioner and current Financial Adviser to the Vatican (part of the Administration of the Patrimony of the Apostolic See), Peter Sutherland. He spoke of his early life, his tenure as a member of the European Commission, his ultimately successful attempt at winning the post of Director General of the predecessor of the World Trade Organization, GATT. Sutherland also told of how he and his family were on the receiving end of calls and letters which he described as "very threatening" during a referendum debate on the pro-life amendment to the Constitution of Ireland in 1983, describing the whole affair as "a very traumatic" one for them.

Date of broadcast	Interview
1 October 2006	Diarmuid Martin
8 October 2006	Nickey Brennan
15 October 2006	Emily O'Reilly
22 October 2006	Hans Blix
29 October 2006	Frances P. Ruane
5 November 2006	Maurice Neligan
12 November 2006	Michael Smurfit
19 November 2006	Michael Colgan
26 November 2006	Ben Dunne
3 December 2006	Justin Kilcullen
10 December 2006	Theo Dorgan
17 December 2006	Peter Sutherland

=== Series two ===
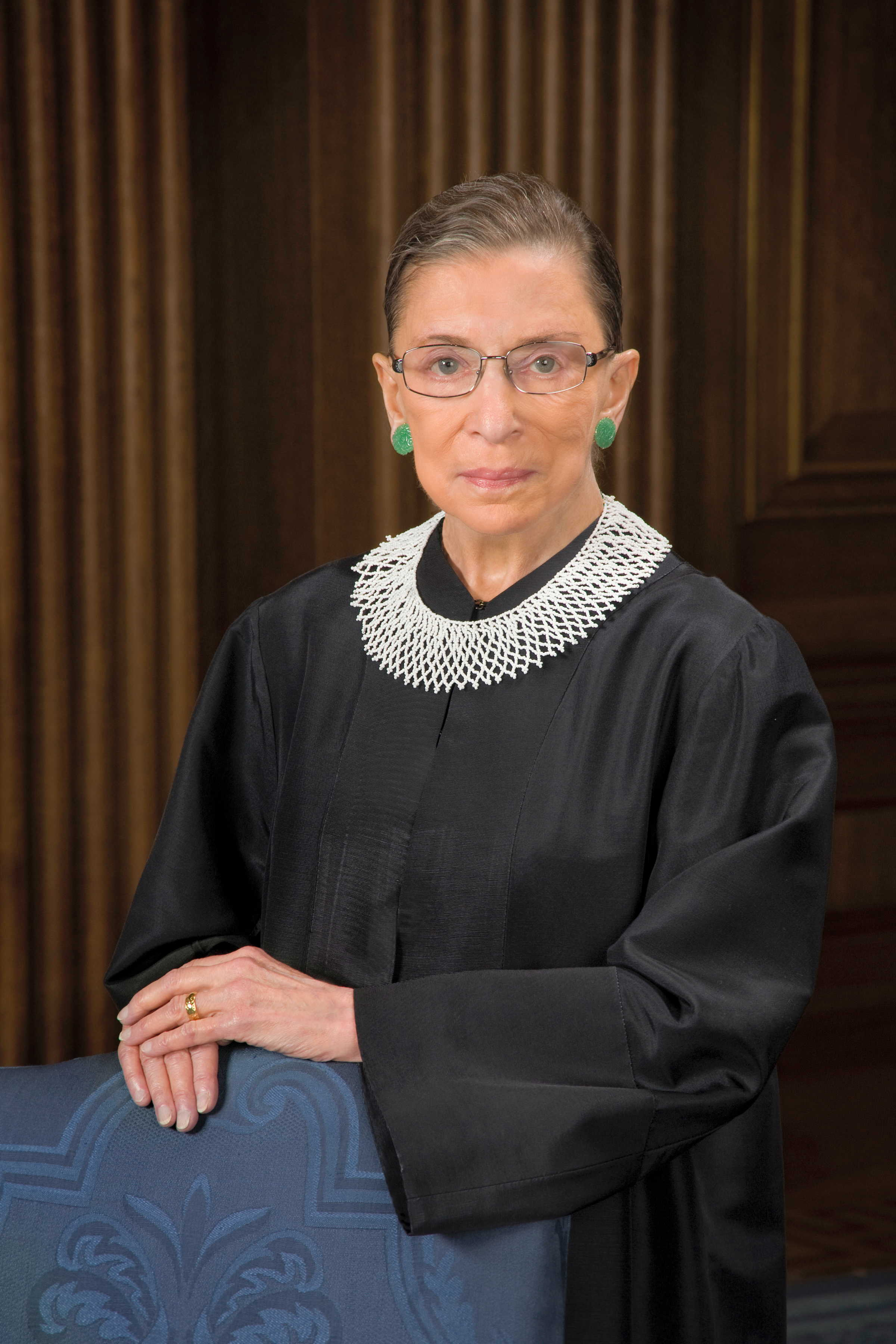
The second series of One to One featured an interview with the US Supreme Court judge, Ruth Bader Ginsburg (pictured above).

The first episode of the second series featured an interview by Crowley with P. J. Mara, an independent business consultant and former Director of Elections for Fianna Fáil. The second episode featured an interview by Dobson with former minister of state and Deputy Leader of the Progressive Democrats, Liz O'Donnell. The third episode featured an interview by Lawlor with Jack O'Connor, the General President of the SIPTU trade union. The fourth episode featured an interview by Crowley with Ulick McEvaddy, the pioneering aircraft businessman. The fifth episode featured an interview by Dobson with the economic architect of Ireland, T. K. Whitaker. The sixth episode featured an interview by Cunningham with the Pulitzer Prize-winning journalist Seymour Hersh. The seventh episode featured an interview by Crowley with Alan Johnston, a BBC journalist best known for having been held hostage for a time in Gaza. The eighth episode featured an interview by Lawlor with Ruth Bader Ginsburg, US Supreme Court judge. The ninth episode featured an interview by Crowley with Colm Tóibín, a novelist. The tenth episode featured an interview by Lawlor with Enda McDonagh, the former Professor of Moral Theology at National University of Ireland, Maynooth. The eleventh episode featured an interview by Murray with the Chief Executive of the Football Association of Ireland John Delaney in which he spoke of Ireland's performances in the UEFA Euro 2008 qualifiers under their departed coach Steve Staunton. The twelfth episode of the series featured an interview by Lawlor with Seán FitzPatrick, then chairman of the Anglo Irish Bank then Ireland's third largest bank – the interview took place before his resignation in a controversy over hidden loans one year later and the bank's subsequent nationalisation in 2009.

Date of broadcast	Interview
1 October 2007	P. J. Mara
8 October 2007	Liz O'Donnell
15 October 2007	Jack O'Connor
22 October 2007	Ulick McEvaddy
29 October 2007	T. K. Whitaker
5 November 2007	Seymour Hersh
13 November 2007	Alan Johnston
19 November 2007	Ruth Bader Ginsburg
26 November 2007	Colm Tóibín
3 December 2007	Enda McDonagh
10 December 2007	John Delaney
17 December 2007	Seán FitzPatrick

=== Series three ===
The first episode of the third series featured an interview by Lawlor with the politician Tony Gregory, broadcast months before his death. The second episode featured an interview by Dobson with Roy Foster, an author and Professor of Irish History. The third episode featured an interview by Lawlor with Samantha Power, a Harvard professor and former advisor to later US president Barack Obama. In this interview, Lawlor "allowed Power to drone on in that earnest and humourless way peculiar to people who think that what they have to say is of grave global import".

The fourth episode featured an interview by Cunningham with Padraig O hUiginn, former secretary general at the Department of the Taoiseach. Afterwards Sunday Independent columnist Brendan O'Connor compared Cunningham to the hero in US television series Columbo: "seemingly awkward, nerdy and self-effacing and merely innocently asking odd questions, while all the time letting his subject reveal himself". The fifth episode featured an interview by Lawlor with the grandson of the founder of Barry's Tea, Peter Barry, known for negotiating the 1985 Anglo-Irish Agreement while Minister for Foreign Affairs. The sixth episode featured an interview by Lawlor with Hugh R. Brady, who was appointed President of University College Dublin in 2004 – aged forty-four he was the youngest ever to fill the position.

Date of broadcast	Interview
9 June 2008	Tony Gregory
16 June 2008	Roy Foster
23 June 2008	Samantha Power
30 June 2008	Padraig O hUiginn
7 July 2008	Peter Barry
14 July 2008	Hugh R. Brady

=== Series four ===
The first episode of the fourth series featured an interview by Murray with the Eddie O'Sullivan, his first television interview since resigning as coach of the Ireland national rugby union team. The second episode featured an interview by Lawlor with the founder of the anti-Lisbon Treaty group Libertas, Declan Ganley. Lawlor spent the interview "looking over the top of her glasses at him, utterly determined to put a halt to his gallop, and still he kept on coming". Ganley criticised those who questioned the funding of Libertas, including European Greens–European Free Alliance President Daniel Cohn-Bendit, Minister of State for European Affairs Dick Roche and European Parliament President Hans-Gert Pöttering who have raised the question of investigating Libertas' funding. On asking donors to rescind their right to privacy for the sake of transparency, Ganley said: "No, of course I wouldn't do that. Why? So Daniel Cohn-Bendit can pour tar and feather over them? Absolutely not." On claims by Roche that his company Rivada Networks had links to the US military, he replied: "Bless Dick Roche's heart. The man knows very little about business, it would appear."

The third episode featured an interview by Dobson with the writer, Anthony Cronin. The fourth episode featured an interview by Murray with John A. Murphy, Emeritus Professor of Irish History at University College Cork and Independent Senator of the late 1970s and 1980s, who once remarked "we shouldn't believe something just because we learned it in our schools". The fifth episode featured an interview by Dobson with Robert Ballagh, an artist. The sixth episode featured an interview by Murray with Ted Crosbie of the media company, Thomas Crosbie Holdings. The seventh episode featured an interview by Lawlor with the Chief Executive of the Electricity Supply Board (ESB), Padraig McManus in which he discussed rising energy prices and the future of the ESB. The eighth episode featured an interview by MacCoille with Brian Cody, manager of the Kilkenny hurling team. The ninth episode featured an interview by Dobson with the former Chief Executive of IDA Ireland, Padraic White. The tenth episode featured an interview by Cunningham with the Harvard-trained economist Jeffrey Sachs, known for his shock therapy treatment. The eleventh episode featured an interview by MacCoille with Máirín Quill, a former Progressive Democrat TD about the collapse of the political party. The twelfth episode featured an interview by Cunningham with the Director of Front Line, the International Foundation for the Protection of Human Rights Defenders, Mary Lawlor.

Date of broadcast	Interview
10 November 2008	Eddie O'Sullivan
17 November 2008	Declan Ganley
24 November 2008	Anthony Cronin
1 December 2008	John A. Murphy
8 December 2008	Robert Ballagh
15 December 2008	Ted Crosbie
9 February 2009	Padraig McManus
16 February 2009	Brian Cody
23 February 2009	Padraic White
2 March 2009	Jeffrey Sachs
9 March 2009	Máirín Quill
16 March 2009	Mary Lawlor
