= Coimisiún na Gaeltachta =

Irish government inquiry into the status of the Irish language (2000–2002)

In the Republic of Ireland, the Coimisiún na Gaeltachta (CnaG; lit. 'Gaeltacht Commission') was a government agency which worked from 2000 to 2002 to draft recommendations to strengthen the role of the Irish language in the Gaeltacht, the Irish-language-speaking area of Ireland. It was established at the instigation of Éamon Ó Cuív, the Minister of State at the Department of Arts, Heritage, Gaeltacht and the Islands, and its work completed under the guidance of his successor, Mary Coughlan. The Irish Government approved the publication of the Commission's report, without commitment.

For centuries, there has been a steady decline in the number of native Irish speakers in Ireland. These speakers are now concentrated in scattered rural areas known collectively as the Gaeltacht and recent reports claim that in several of these areas Irish is no longer effectively a community language. The establishment, subsequent reporting, and relative inaction on the recommendations of the Commission should be seen against this background.

The Commission reported that it was "of the view that it will not be possible to maintain the Gaeltacht as an area in which Irish remains a community language unless a fundamental change occurs in the way Irish is treated and in the status of Irish in the rest of the country." In its work, it focussed primarily on a strategic approach to finding an effective implementation structure which would allow its recommendations to be realised. It proposed a structure which they hoped would ensure an advisory process at planning level and which would be community friendly and language-centred at the operational level - this would include the establishment of a Board of Independent Commissioners and the restructuring of Údarás na Gaeltachta.

Other recommendations of the Report were:

1. The immediate enactment of an Official Languages Equality Bill;
2. The provision of a comprehensive education system in which priority would be given to Irish as the first language of the Gaeltacht;
3. The establishment of a dedicated Third Level Education Unit for Irish language sociolinguistic studies and language planning;
4. The development and implementation of a National Plan for Irish.

There was an earlier Coimisiún na Gaeltachta in 1926, and in 1963 there was a Government Commission on the Restoration of Irish. The 1926 report was later criticized for not paying sufficient attention to the role of economically driven emigration of Irish-speakers from the Gaeltacht to the United States.
