= Lace curtain and shanty Irish =

Derogatory stereotypes for Irish people

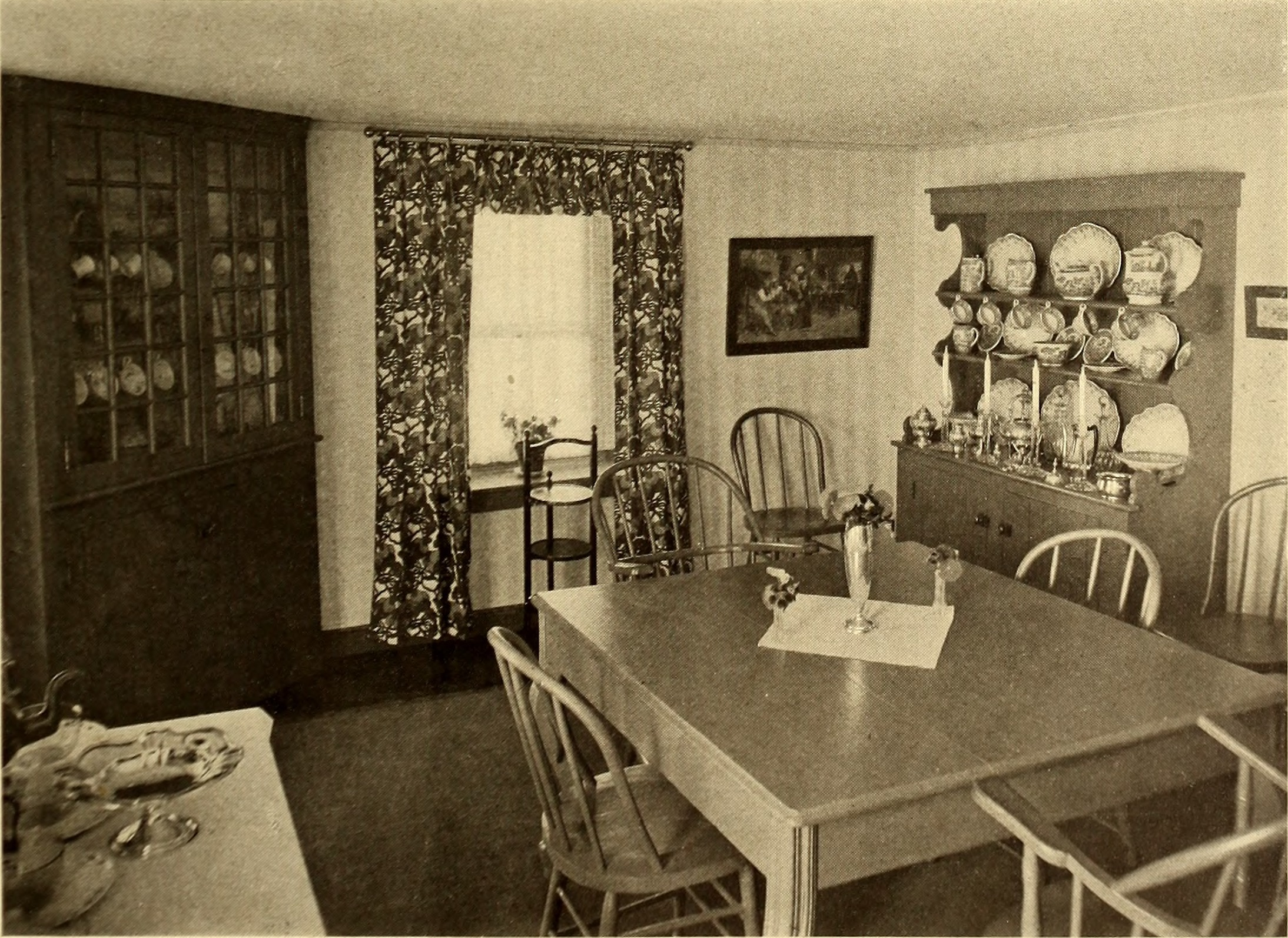
Interior of a prosperous American household in 1905, with a lace curtain

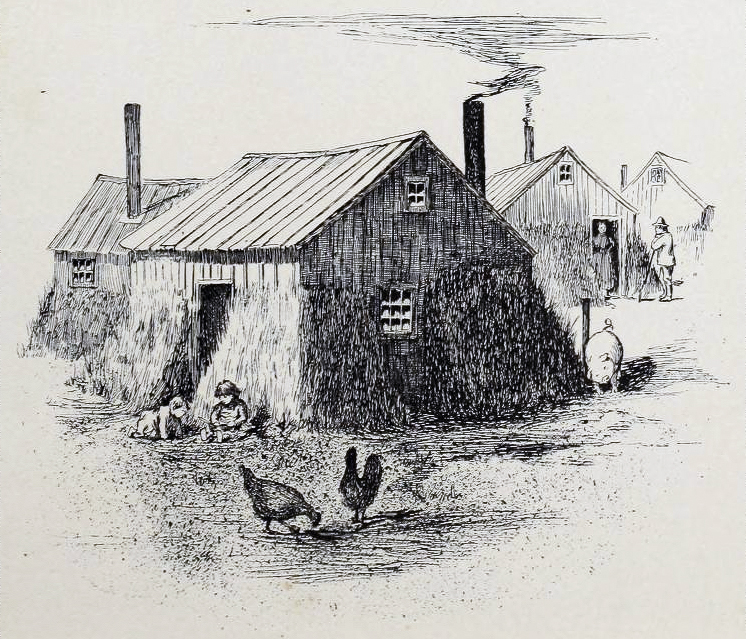
"The Patch", an Irish shanty town in Holyoke, Massachusetts, 1850

Lace curtain Irish and shanty Irish are terms that were commonly used in the 19th and 20th centuries to categorize Irish Americans, by social class. The "lace curtain Irish" were those who were well-off, while the "shanty Irish" were the poor, who were presumed to live in shanties, or roughly built cabins.

Neither term was complimentary. Aside from financial status, the term "lace curtain Irish" connoted pretentiousness and social climbing, while the "shanty Irish" were stereotyped as feckless and ignorant. Though lace curtains later became commonplace in Irish-American working-class homes, "lace curtain" was still used in a metaphorical, and often pejorative, sense. In the early 20th century, James Michael Curley, a famously populist Boston politician who was called "mayor of the poor", used the term "cut glass Irish" to mock the Irish-American middle class, but the term did not catch on. The term “two-toilet Irish” has also been used as a synonym for lace curtain Irish.

Irish Americans who prospered or married well could go from "shanty Irish" to "lace curtain Irish", and wealthy socialites could have shanty Irish roots. John F. Kennedy, for example, is considered "lace curtain" even though his great-grandparents were working-class Irish immigrants.

== Origin ==
The term "shanty" is suggested as deriving from the Irish noun seanteach (lit. "old house" - pronounced shan-tchawk). though it is closer to the plural noun "old houses", Seantithe, pronounced shan-tiha. However, the direct back translation of shan-ty would arrive at sean tí, the latter word an adjective meaning 'of the house' much in the vein of Bean an tí, ban-on-tee, meaning the matriarch of the house. Many poor Irish tenant farmers lived in one-room cabins. "The Irishman's Shanty", a 19th-century comic song, describes a stereotypical Irishman's quarters:

He has three rooms in one, kitchen, bedroom, and hall,
And his chist is three wooden pegs in the wall:
Two suits of owld clothes make his wardrobe complete,
One to wear in the shanty, that same for the street.

A more likely derivation of "shanty" is from the Canadian French chantier meaning "lumberjack's hut."

== In popular culture ==
The occasional malapropisms and social blunders of the upwardly mobile "lace curtain" Irish were gleefully lampooned in vaudeville, popular song, and comic strips such as Bringing Up Father, starring Maggie and Jiggs, which ran in daily newspapers for 87 years (1913 to 2000).

In James T. Farrell's novel trilogy Studs Lonigan (1932–1935), which is set in an Irish-American Chicago neighborhood during the early twentieth century including the Great Depression, the father of Studs refers to their pompous neighbor Dennis Gorman as "Stickin' up his nose and actin' like he was high-brow, lace-curtain Irish." Other, usually derogatory, references are made to "lace-curtain Irish" throughout the novel, and at one point Studs is jokingly greeted by his friends as "Shanty Irish Lonigan."

In the Season 10 episode of Law & Order "Entitled," New York District Attorney (DA) Adam Schiff (played by Steven Hill) is asked by New York Assistant District Attorney Abbie Carmichael (played by Angie Harmon), “Why is everyone so afraid of this [defendant of Irish background]?” to which Schiff replies, "[the defendant’s] favorite joke, it's the difference between lace-curtain Irish and shanty Irish..." New York Executive Assistant District Attorney (Jack McCoy (played by Sam Waterston) responds by saying, "With lace-curtain Irish, they move the dishes before they piss in the kitchen sink!" Later, McCoy states proudly that like the defendant, he too is shanty Irish.

In The Departed (2006), Staff Sergeant Dignam repeatedly points out the dichotomy between the lace curtain Irish lifestyle Billy Costigan enjoyed with his mother, and the shanty Irish lifestyle of Costigan's father.

The dichotomous labels caused some in-fighting among Irish people. Some saw "lace curtain" Irish Americans as betraying their Irish roots in an attempt to curry favor with White Anglo-Saxon Protestants (WASPs). "To be genuinely Irish is to challenge WASP dominance," wrote California politician Tom Hayden. The depiction of Irish people in the films of John Ford was a counterpoint to WASP standards of rectitude. "The procession of rambunctious and feckless Celts through Ford's films, Irish and otherwise, was meant to cock a snoot at WASP or 'lace-curtain Irish' ideas of respectability."

In a 1999 episode of The Sopranos called "The Legend of Tennessee Moltisanti", Livia tells Carmela her neighbor is "so shanty Irish with all her airs."
