= Scottish Wikipedia =

Scottish Wikipedia may refer to one of two language versions of Wikipedia:

- Scots Wikipedia, in the Scots language, a West Germanic language
- Scottish Gaelic Wikipedia, in Scottish Gaelic, a Celtic language
