= Gaeltacht =

Primarily Irish-speaking regions in Ireland

Official Gaeltacht regions in Ireland

A Gaeltacht (/ˈɡeɪltəxt/ GAYL-təkht, Irish: [ˈɡeːl̪ˠt̪ˠəxt̪ˠ], pl. Gaeltachtaí) is a district of Ireland, either individually or collectively, where the Irish government recognises that the Irish language is the predominant vernacular, or language of the home. The Gaeltacht districts were first officially recognised during the 1920s in the early years of the Irish Free State, following the Gaelic revival, as part of a government policy aimed at restoring the Irish language.

The Gaeltacht is threatened by serious language decline. Research published in 2015 showed that Irish is spoken on a daily basis by two-thirds or more of the population in only 21 of the 155 electoral divisions in the Gaeltacht. Daily language use by two-thirds or more of the population is regarded by some academics as a tipping point for language survival.

== Etymology ==
The use of the word Gaeltacht as geographic descriptor can be dated back to the 1890s with its use by Conradh na Gaeilge; the term had originally meant "the state of being Gaelic", in contrast to Galltacht, meaning "the state of being foreign".

== Geographical area ==
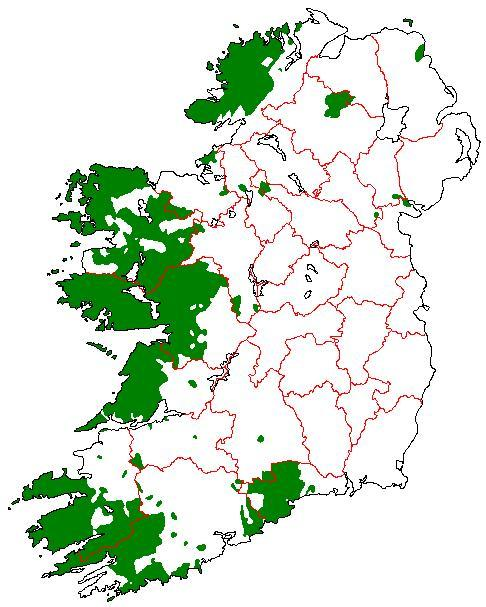
An Ghaeltacht 1926; areas of the island of Ireland which would have qualified for Gaeltacht status according to the first Coimisiún na Gaeltachta

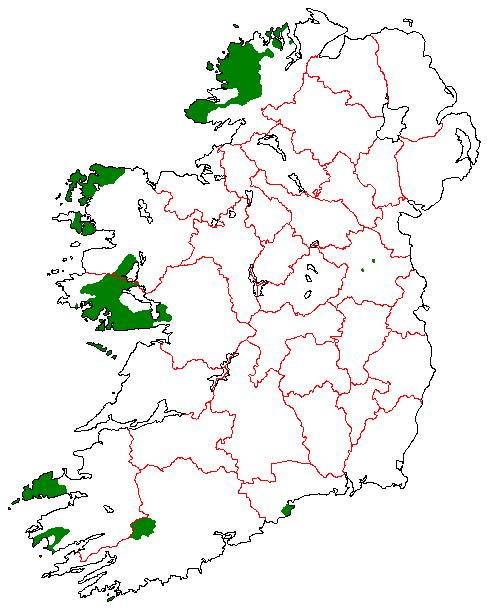
An Ghaeltacht as defined from 1967 to 1974

In 1926, the official Gaeltacht was designated as a result of the report of the first Gaeltacht Commission, Coimisiún na Gaeltachta. The exact boundaries were not defined. At the time, an area was classified as Gaeltacht if 80% or more of the population was Irish-speaking; however, partial-Gaeltacht status was also accorded to many areas that did not meet the threshold, so long as they were at least 25% Irish-speaking. The Irish Free State recognised that there were predominantly Irish-speaking or semi-Irish-speaking districts in 7 of its 26 counties, covering 22 districts, but also noted that the Irish-speaking population was declining, and that education through Irish was difficult to source.

In the 1950s, another Gaeltacht Commission concluded that the Gaeltacht boundaries were ill-defined. It recommended that Gaeltacht status be based solely on the strength of language use in an area.

The Ministers and Secretaries (Amendment) Act 1956, which created the position of Minister for the Gaeltacht, permitted the designation of areas as being Gaeltacht districts. They were defined precisely by designating district electoral divisions and townlands, and excluded many areas in which the number of Irish speakers had declined. Gaeltacht areas were recognised in six of the state's 26 counties: Donegal, Galway, Mayo, Kerry, Cork, and Waterford, with County Clare, included in 1926, no longer counted. Two areas of County Meath, settled with Irish speakers in the 1930s, were added in 1967. Since then, there have been minor extensions: in 1974 to include Brandon, County Kerry and in Waterford, and in 1982 in Meath and Cork.

There are 26 Gaeltacht Language Planning Areas defined under the Gaeltacht Act 2012.

== 21st-century reports ==
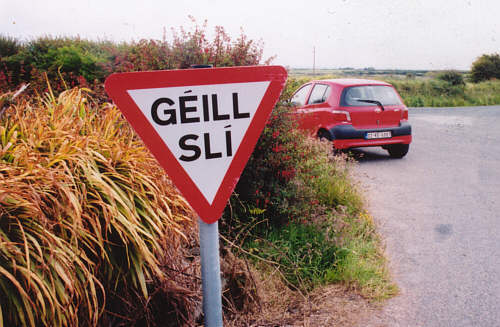
Traffic sign, meaning "Give Way" or "Yield", in Ring, County Waterford

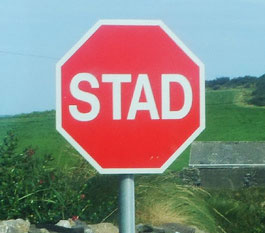
Traffic sign, meaning "Stop"

In 2002 the third Coimisiún na Gaeltachta stated in its report that the erosion of the use of Irish in the Gaeltacht was now such that it was only a matter of time before the Gaeltacht disappeared. In some areas, Irish had already ceased to be a community language. Even in the strongest Gaeltacht areas, current patterns of bilingualism were leading to the dominance of English. Policies implemented by the State and voluntary groups were having no effect. The report recommended that a new language reinforcement strategy was required, one that had the confidence of the community itself.

The Commission recommended, among many other things, that the boundaries of the official Gaeltacht should be redrawn. It also recommended a comprehensive linguistic study to assess the vitality of the Irish language in the remaining Gaeltacht districts. The study was undertaken by Acadamh na hOllscolaíochta Gaeilge (part of the National University of Ireland, Galway). On 1 November 2007 Staidéar Cuimsitheach Teangeolaíoch ar Úsáid na Gaeilge sa Ghaeltacht ("A Comprehensive Linguistic Study of the Usage of Irish in the Gaeltacht") was published. Concerning Gaeltacht boundaries, it suggested creating three linguistic zones within the Gaeltacht region:

- A – more than 67% daily Irish speaking – Irish dominant as the community language
- B – 44%–66% daily Irish speaking – English dominant, with large Irish-speaking minority
- C – less than 44% daily Irish speaking – English dominant, but with Irish-speaking minority much higher than the national average of Irish speaking

The report suggested that Category A districts should be the State's priority in providing services through Irish and development schemes. It also said that Category C areas that showed a further decline in the use of Irish should lose their Gaeltacht status.

The 2006 census data shows that of the 95,000 people living within the official Gaeltacht, approximately 17,000 belonged to Category A areas, 10,000 to Category B, and 17,000 to Category C, leaving about 50,000 in Gaeltacht areas that did not meet the minimum criteria.

A study in 2005 by the Educational Council for Gaeltacht and Irish-Medium Schools, said that Gaeltacht schools were facing a crisis. It forecast that, without additional support, few of them would be teaching in Irish in 20 years' time, which would threaten the future of the Gaeltacht. Parents felt that the educational system did not support their efforts to pass on Irish as a living language to their children. The study added that a significant number of Gaeltacht schools had switched to teaching in English, and others were wavering.

The stated aim of the Gaeltacht Act 2012 was to provide for a new definition of boundaries based on language criteria, but it was criticised for doing the opposite of this. Before its enactment, critics drew attention to section 7 of the bill, which stated that all areas "currently within the Gaeltacht" would maintain their current Gaeltacht status, regardless of whether Irish was used. This status could only be revoked if the area failed to prepare a language plan (with no necessary relationship to the documented number of speakers). The Bill was also criticised for placing all responsibility for the maintenance of Irish on voluntary organisations, with no increase in government resources.

The annual report in 2012 by An Coimisinéir Teanga reinforced these criticisms by emphasising the failure of the State to provide Irish-language services to Irish speakers in the Gaeltacht and elsewhere. The report said that Irish in the Gaeltacht was now at its most fragile and that the State could not expect that Irish would survive as a community language if the State kept forcing the use of English on Gaeltacht communities.

A report published in 2015, Nuashonrú ar an Staidéar Cuimsitheach Teangeolaíoch ar Úsáid na Gaeilge sa Ghaeltacht: 2006–2011, said that on present indicators, Irish would cease to be used as a community language in the Gaeltacht within ten years. By the time of the 2022 census, the number of speakers using the language daily had declined to 20,261. The recent decline was in part attributed to the housing crisis, as young people who grew up within the Gaeltacht were unable to afford homes in the area and leave.

== Administration ==
The Department of Rural and Community Development and the Gaeltacht, headed by the Minister for Rural and Community Development and the Gaeltacht, is responsible for the overall government policy with respect to the Gaeltacht, and supervises the work of the Údarás na Gaeltachta and other bodies.

=== Ministers responsible for the Gaeltacht ===
The Ministers and Secretaries (Amendment) Act 1956 created the Department of the Gaeltacht, a Department of State headed by the Minister for the Gaeltacht, a member of the Government.

From 1956 to 1993, the Minister for the Gaeltacht often simultaneously held another portfolio (i.e. charge of another Department of State). Since 1993, rearrangements have combined the Gaeltacht with other responsibilities in a single Department of State and ministerial portfolio. The ministers, and the relevant titles (Department of... and Minister for...) have been as follows:

1956–2011: (Transfers of functions; List of ministers)

- 1956: the Gaeltacht
- 1993: Arts, Culture and the Gaeltacht
- 1997: Arts, Heritage, Gaeltacht and the Islands
- 2002: Community, Rural and Gaeltacht Affairs
- 2010: Community, Equality and Gaeltacht Affairs

2011–2025: (Transfers of functions; List of ministers)

- 2011: Arts, Heritage and the Gaeltacht
- 2016: Arts, Heritage, Regional, Rural and Gaeltacht Affairs
- 2017: Culture, Heritage and the Gaeltacht
- 2020: Tourism, Culture, Arts, Gaeltacht, Sport and Media

Since 2025: (Transfers of functions; List of ministers)

- 2025: Rural and Community Development and the Gaeltacht

In March 2005, Minister for Community, Rural and Gaeltacht Affairs Éamon Ó Cuív announced that the government of Ireland would begin listing only the Irish language versions of place names in the Gaeltachtaí as the official names, stripping the official Ordnance Survey of their English equivalents, to bring them up to date with road signs in the Gaeltacht, which have been in Irish only since 1970. This was done under a Placenames Order made under the Official Languages Act 2003.

== Gaeltachtaí in the Republic of Ireland ==
=== Demographics ===
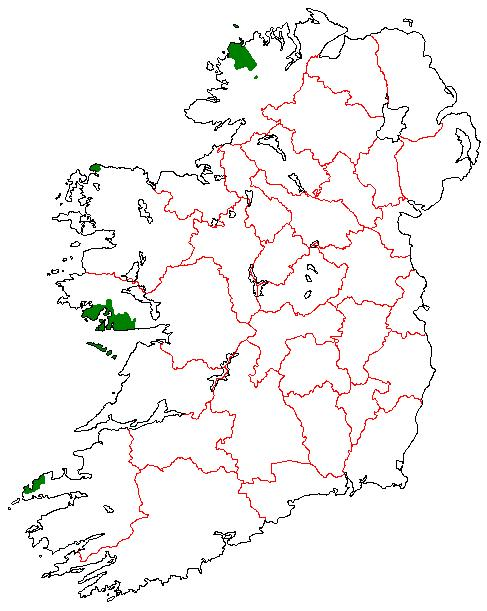
An Ghaeltacht 2007, zones within Category A

The 2022 census of the Republic of Ireland showed that the population of the Gaeltacht was 102,973, 2% of the total population; this figure represented an increase of 2% from 2016. 65,156 (66%) of the Gaeltacht population were Irish speakers. As of the 2022 census, English is the family and community language in the majority of the 156 electoral divisions of the Gaeltacht.

The percentage of respondents who said they spoke Irish daily outside the education system in the 2011 census.

The Gaeltacht districts have historically suffered from mass emigration. Being at the edge of the island they always had fewer railways and roads, and poorer land to farm. Other influences have been the arrival of non-Irish speaking families, the marginal role of the Irish language in the education system and general pressure from the English-speaking community. There is no evidence that periods of relative prosperity have materially improved the situation of the language.

=== Donegal Gaeltacht ===
The Donegal (or Tyrconnell) Gaeltacht (Irish: Gaeltacht [Chontae] Dhún na nGall or Gaeltacht Thír Chonaill) has a population of 23,346 (Census 2016) and represents 23.4% of the total Gaeltacht population. The Donegal Gaeltacht encompasses a geographical area of 1,502 km^{2} (580 sq mi). This represents 26% of total Gaeltacht land area. The three parishes of the Rosses, Gweedore and Cloughaneely constitute the main centre of population of the Donegal Gaeltacht. There are over 17,132 Irish speakers, 14,500 in areas where it is spoken by 30–100% of the population and 2,500 in areas where it is spoken by less than 30%. In 2006 there were 2,436 people employed in a full-time capacity in Údarás na Gaeltachta client companies in the Donegal Gaeltacht. This region is particularly popular with students of the Ulster dialect; each year thousands of students visit the area from Northern Ireland. Donegal is unique in the Gaeltacht regions, as its accent and dialect is unmistakably northern in character. The language has many similarities with Scottish Gaelic, which are not evident in other Irish dialects.

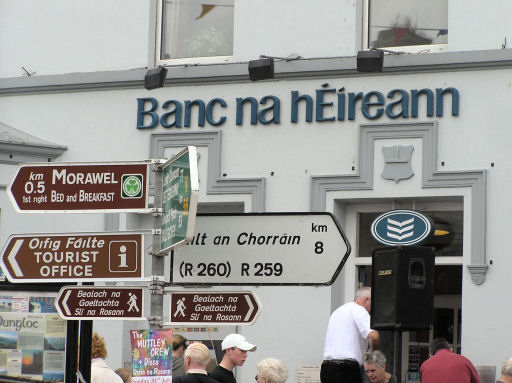
Signs in Irish in Dungloe, County Donegal.

Gweedore in County Donegal is the largest Gaeltacht parish in Ireland, which is home to regional studios of RTÉ Raidió na Gaeltachta. It has produced well-known traditional musicians, including the bands Altan and Clannad, as well as the artist Enya. All three have recorded music in Irish.

=== Galway Gaeltacht ===
The Galway County (Irish: Gaeltacht Chontae na Gaillimhe) and Galway City (Irish: Gaeltacht Chathair na Gaillimhe) Gaeltachtaí have a combined population of 50,570 (2016) and represent 50.8% of total Gaeltacht population. The Galway Gaeltacht encompasses a geographical area of 1,225 km^{2} (473 sq mi). This represents 26% of total Gaeltacht land area.

There is also a third-level constituent college of National University of Ireland Galway (NUIG) called Acadamh na hOllscolaíochta Gaeilge in An Cheathrú Rua and Carna. The national Irish-language radio station Raidió na Gaeltachta is located in Casla, the Tuairisc online newspaper is in Barna, and the national television station TG4 is in Baile na hAbhann. Galway city is home to the Irish language theatre Taibhdhearc na Gaillimhe.

=== Kerry Gaeltacht ===
The Kerry Gaeltacht (Irish: Gaeltacht [Chontae] Chiarraí) consists of two areas – the western half of Gaeltacht Corca Dhuibhne (Dingle Peninsula) and central and western parts of Iveragh Peninsula (Uíbh Ráthach). The largest settlement in Corca Dhuibhne is Dingle and the largest on the Iveragh Peninsula is Cahersiveen. The largest Gaeltacht settlement on the Iveragh Peninsula is Baile na Sceilge. The Kerry Gaeltacht has a population of 8,729 (6,185 Irish speakers) and represents 9% of total Gaeltacht population. The Kerry Gaeltacht encompasses a geographical area of 642 km^{2} (248 sq mi).

=== Mayo Gaeltacht ===
The Mayo Gaeltacht (Irish: Gaeltacht [Chontae] Mhaigh Eo) as of 2011 has a total population of 10,886 and represents 11.5% of the total Gaeltacht population. The Mayo Gaeltacht encompasses a geographical area of 905 km^{2} (349 sq mi). This represents 19% of the total Gaeltacht land area and comprises three distinct areas – Erris, Achill Island and Toormakeady. There are 6,667 Irish speakers, with 4,000 living in areas where the language is spoken by 30–100% of the population and 2,500 living in areas where it is spoken by less than 30%.

=== Cork Gaeltacht ===
The Cork Gaeltacht (Irish: Gaeltacht [Chontae] Chorcaí) consists of two areas – Muskerry and Cape Clear Island. The Muskerry Gaeltacht has a population of 3,895 people (2,951 Irish speakers) and represents 4% of the total Gaeltacht population. The Cork Gaeltacht encompasses a geographical area of 262 km^{2} (101 sq mi). This represents 6% of the total Gaeltacht area. The largest Muskerry settlements are the villages of Baile Mhic Íre (Ballymakeera), Baile Bhuirne (Ballyvourney), Cill na Martra (Kilnamartyra), and Béal Átha an Ghaorthaidh (Ballingeary).

=== Waterford Gaeltacht ===
The Waterford Gaeltacht (Gaeltacht na nDéise, Irish: Gaeltacht [Chontae] Phort Láirge) is ten kilometres (six miles) west of Dungarvan. It embraces the parishes of Rinn Ua gCuanach (Ring) and An Sean Phobal (Old Parish). The Waterford Gaeltacht has a population of 1,784 people (1,271 Irish speakers) and represents 2% of total Gaeltacht population.

All education in Gaeltacht na nDéise is carried out through the medium of Irish. There are two pre-schools, two primary-level national schools, one Secondary School, Meánscoil San Nioclás and Coláiste na Rinne, a private boarding school and summer college.

=== Meath Gaeltacht ===
The Meath Gaeltacht (Irish: Gaeltacht [Chontae] na Mí) is the smallest Gaeltacht area and consists of the two communities of Ráth Chairn, much the larger, and Baile Ghib. Navan, 8 km (5 mi) from Baile Ghib, is the main urban centre within the region, with a population of more than 20,000. The Meath Gaeltacht has a total population of 1,771 and represents 2% of the total Gaeltacht population. The Meath Gaeltacht encompasses a geographical area of 44 km^{2} (17 sq mi), which represents 1% of the total Gaeltacht land area.

The Meath Gaeltacht has a history quite different from that of the country's other Irish-speaking regions. The Ráth Cairn Gaeltacht area was established in 1935, when 41 families from Connemara in West Galway were resettled on land previously acquired by the Irish Land Commission. Each was given 9 hectares (22 acres) to farm. Baile Ghib (formerly Gibbstown) was settled in the same way in 1937, along with Baile Ailin (formerly Allenstown). In the early years, a large percentage of the population returned to Galway or emigrated, but enough Irish speakers remained to ensure that Ráth Cairn and Baile Ghib were awarded Gaeltacht status in 1967. The original aim of spreading the Irish language into the local community met with no success, and the colonists had to become bilingual.

== Revival and innovation ==
There are areas of Ireland, north and south, where an attempt is being made to re-establish Irish-speaking communities, with varying levels of success. Such areas are both urban and rural. Most daily speakers of Irish now live outside the existing Gaeltacht areas, and are particularly numerous in Dublin. In 2018 Foras na Gaeilge announced that Carn Tóchair in County Londonderry was going to be one of the first five Irish language networks on the island of Ireland, along with Belfast, Loughrea in County Galway, Ennis in County Clare, and Clondalkin in Dublin.

=== Dublin ===
In 2022, Dublin and its suburbs were reported to be the site of the largest number of daily Irish speakers, with 16,440 persons speaking Irish daily, representing 23 per cent of all daily speakers. In a survey of a small sample of adults who had grown up in Dublin and had completed full-time education, 54% of respondents reported some fluency in Irish, ranging from being able to make small talk to complete fluency. Only 19% of speakers spoke Irish three or more times per week, with a plurality (43%) speaking Irish less than once a fortnight.

There is an Irish-language centre Áras Chrónáin in Clondalkin and an Irish language GAA club Na Gaeil Óga CLG based in Lucan and the Phoenix Park. There is also an Irish-language pub Club Chonradh na Gaeilge on Harcourt Street.

County Dublin has over 50 Gaelscoileanna including 10 Gaelcholáistí.

=== Northern Ireland ===
In 2001 the British government ratified the European Charter for Regional or Minority Languages. Irish (in Northern Ireland) was specified under Part III of the Charter, giving it a status comparable to that of the Welsh language or Scottish Gaelic. This included undertakings in relation to education, translation of statutes, interaction with public authorities, the use of placenames, media access, support for cultural activities and other matters. Compliance with the state's obligations is assessed periodically by a Committee of Experts of the Council of Europe.

A language revival has also taken place in southern County Londonderry, centred on Slaghtneill (Sleacht Néill) and Carntogher (Carn Tóchair), both outside Maghera.

In 2022 the British Parliament passed the Identity and Language (Northern Ireland) Act 2022, which made Irish, alongside English, an official language in Northern Ireland. It also repealed the Administration of Justice (Language) Act (Ireland) 1737, which had banned the use of Irish in the courts. In January 2024 Irish was spoken in a Belfast court for the first time in nearly 300 years.

=== West Clare ===
Parts of County Clare were recognised as Gaeltacht areas following recommendations made by Coimisiún na Gaeltachta 1925. In 1956, however, it was decided that there were too few traditional speakers to justify the inclusion of Clare in the Official Gaeltacht. Since then there have been attempts to re-establish the language in the community, and it was claimed in 2012 that there were up to 170 people in County Clare who were daily speakers of Irish. The main activist group is Coiste Forbartha Gaeltachta Chontae an Chláir (The Gaeltacht Development Committee for County Clare), whose aim is to achieve Gaeltacht status for County Clare or for part of it.

=== North America ===
The Permanent North American Gaeltacht is an area in Tamworth, Ontario in Canada. It has no permanent residents but serves as a resource centre for Irish speakers throughout North America. It was officially opened in 2007.

== Media ==
RTÉ Raidió na Gaeltachta, the RTÉ radio station serving the Gaeltacht and Irish speakers generally, is based in Casla, County Galway. It also has studios at Gaoth Dobhair, County Donegal; Baile na nGall in Ard na Caithne, County Kerry; Castlebar, County Mayo; with a smaller studio in Ring, County Waterford and the RTÉ Radio Centre in Dublin.

Teilifís na Gaeilge is based in Baile na hAbhann, County Galway, and runs the Irish-language television station TG4.

== Irish colleges ==
Irish colleges are residential Irish language summer courses that give students the opportunity to be totally immersed in the language, usually for periods of three weeks over the summer months. During these courses, students attend classes and participate in a variety of different activities games, music, art and sport. There are a number of different Irish colleges for students to choose from throughout the country. Many of the colleges while providing a range of activities and events for young people through the Irish language will be known for or specialise in a specific category. For example, Coláiste Lurgan is commonly known for its promotion of the Irish language through music, Coláiste Aodáin for water sports and team games, and others for GAA sports.

As with the conventional schools, the Department of Education sets out requirements for class sizes and qualifications required by teachers. Some courses are college-based and others provide for residence with host families in Gaeltacht areas, such as Ros Muc in Galway, Ráth Cairn in County Meath, and Teileann and Rann na Feirste in County Donegal, with instruction given by a bean an tí, or Irish-speaking landlady. Popular Irish colleges/Gaeltachts include: Spleodar, Colaiste Sheosaimh and Uisce. Most Irish language summer colleges for teenagers in the Gaeltacht are supported and represented by CONCOS, who are based in Leitir Móir.

== See also ==
- Ulster Irish
- Connacht Irish
- Munster Irish
- Údarás na Gaeltachta The Gaeltacht Authority
- CONCOS Federation of Irish language Summer colleges
- Gaeltacht Service Town
- Status of the Irish language
- Gaeltarra Éireann — replaced in 1980 by Údarás na Gaeltachta
- Gàidhealtachd – equivalent region for Scottish Gaelic
- Y Fro Gymraeg – equivalent region for Welsh
