= Irish Wikipedia =

Irish-language edition of Wikipedia

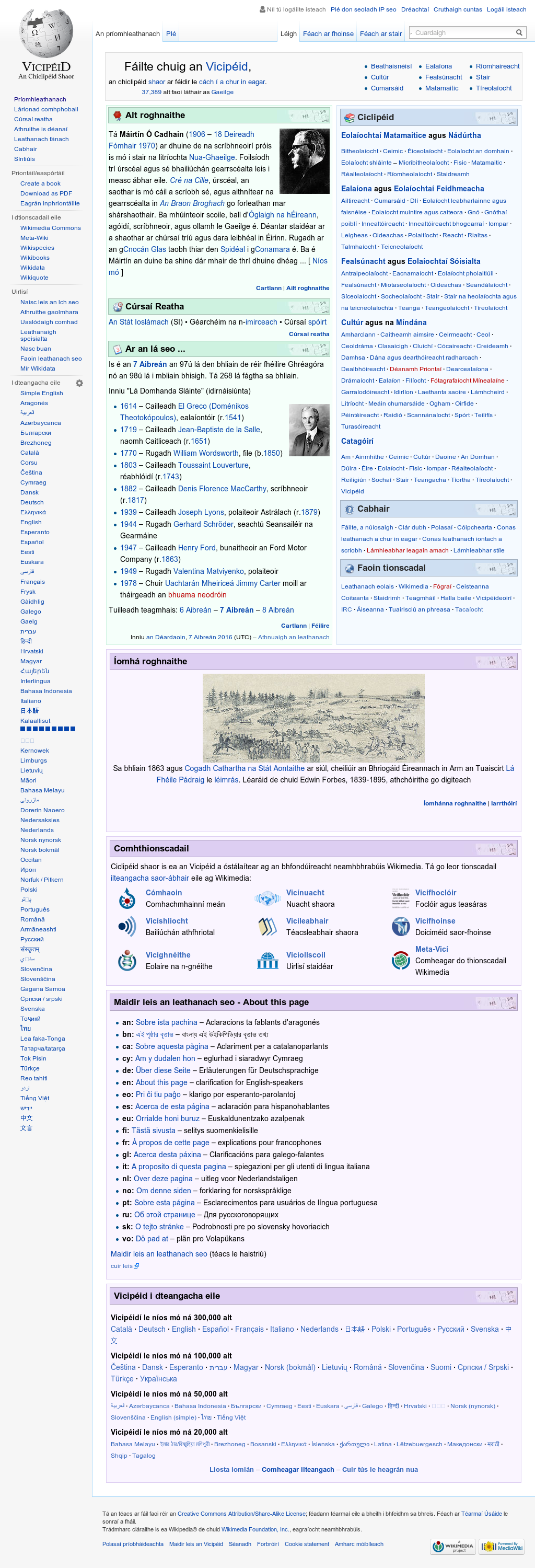
- Screenshot Main Page of the Irish Wikipedia in April 2016
- Website type: Internet encyclopedia project
- Available in: Irish
- Headquarters: San Francisco, California
- Owner: Wikimedia Foundation (non-profit)
- Website: ga.wikipedia.org
- Commercial: No
- Registration: Optional (required only for certain tasks such as editing protected pages, creating pages or uploading files)
- Users: 75,636 (total registered, as of 22 September 2026)
- Launched: October 2003; 22 years ago
- Current status: Active
- Content license: Creative Commons Attribution/ Share-Alike 4.0 (most text also dual-licensed under GFDL); Media licensing varies

The Irish Wikipedia (Irish: Vicipéid na Gaeilge), also known as An Vicipéid, is the Irish-language version of Wikipedia, run by the Wikimedia Foundation and established in October 2003, with the first article being written in January 2004. The founder of Vicipéid was Gabriel Beecham. In September 2005 over 1600 articles had been written, with 173 contributors (both regular and irregular) having written material. By March 2007, about 20 regular Wikipedians were writing articles, with up to 7,000 articles having been created. As of December 2024, it was the 96th largest Wikipedia among 340 active Wikipedias.

The Vicipéid draws (with permission) directly from Fréamh an Eolais, an Irish-language encyclopedia of science and technology, written by Matt Hussey.

== Evaluation ==
The Vicipéid has been favourably received by some Irish-language media. In his paper on Putting the learning back into learning technology, Barry McMullin of Dublin City University suggested that while the Irish Wikipedia is never likely to contain as many articles as the Wikipedias in the world's most widespread languages, it is still a useful resource.

Other academic sources have emphasised the site's educational value. The role of the Vicipéid as an educational tool at tertiary level has been acknowledged in the context of Wikimedia use, involving projects supported by University of Galway.

== See also ==
- Tuairisc.ie
- Scottish Gaelic Wikipedia
- Welsh Wikipedia
- Breton Wikipedia
- Scots Wikipedia
