= Cathal Mac Coille =

20th and 21st-century Irish journalist and broadcaster

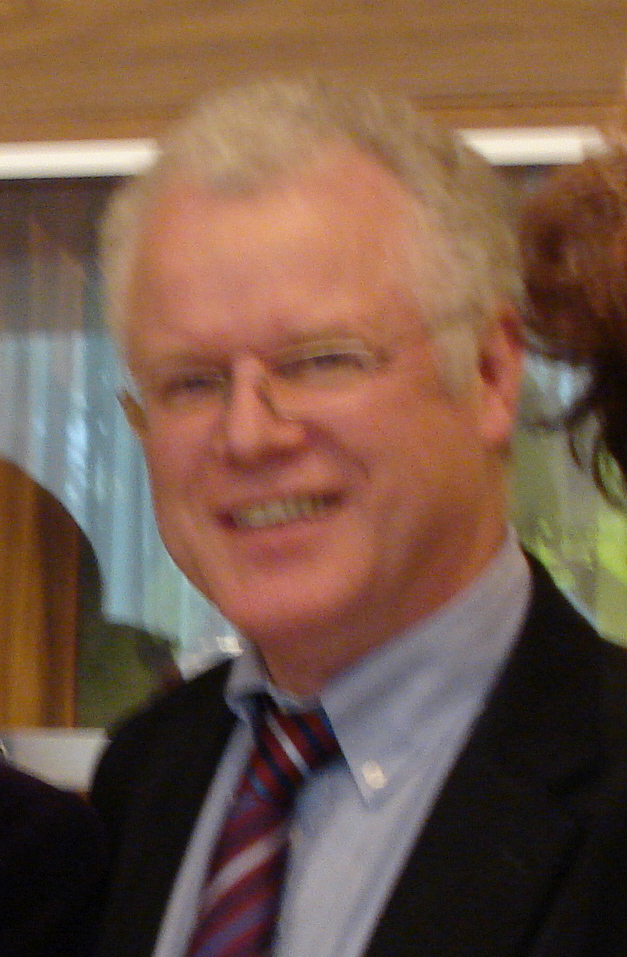
- Cathal Mac Coille in 2009
- Born: 1952 (age 73–74); Clondalkin, Dublin, Ireland
- Education: University College Dublin
- Occupations: Journalist, broadcaster
- Notable credit: Morning Ireland
- Children: 4

Cathal Mac Coille (born 1952) is a retired Irish broadcaster, researcher and journalist. He was a co-presenter of Morning Ireland on RTÉ Radio 1 for most of the period from 1986 until his retirement in 2017. He currently writes opinion pieces for Tuairisc.ie, a role he took up in 2014. He was used by RTÉ in numerous political broadcasts and interviewed several prominent politicians.

Mac Coille also presented other shows on radio and television, including This Week and One to One. His journalism work has included stints with Comhar and the Sunday Tribune and he also spent time as a reporter with TG4.

== Career ==
Mac Coille started his career as editor of the Irish language magazine, Comhar. He then went on to get a Bachelor of Arts in History from University College Dublin. He first joined RTÉ as a radio researcher in 1974, initially working at the Nuacht desk for five years. He was a member of the RTÉ Northern Staff from 1978 to 1984 and from 1984 to 1986 presented This Week and other news programmes. He worked as political correspondent with Irish language television channel, TG4. He also worked as a journalist with the Sunday Tribune newspaper for five years from 1990.

Mac Coille is best known for presenting Morning Ireland on RTÉ Radio 1, which is Ireland's most listened to radio programme and has been on air since 1984. He joined the Morning Ireland team in 1986, left the show in 1990 but returned again from 2001 until his retirement in 2017. In 1990, Mac Coille won a Jacob's Award for his work as presenter of Morning Ireland. Mac Coille regularly interviewed politicians such as Gerry Adams and Eoin Ryan Jnr, and breakfasted politically with CNN broadcaster Larry King on Super Tuesday in February 2008.

Mac Coille has also worked on One to One, a television interview series broadcast on RTÉ One. In radio he worked on the Good Friday Agreement and the 2008 United States presidential election. Mac Coille was part of a crew of RTÉ employees who travelled to the United States to cover the Super Tuesday election event, a move which was later criticised when the true cost emerged.

In September 2010 on Morning Ireland Mac Coille received a controversial nine-minute live interview from Taoiseach Brian Cowen at a Fianna Fáil think-in in Galway; the interview received international attention and led to increased pressure on Cowen to resign in the days that followed.

== Personal life ==
Mac Coille grew up in Clondalkin and attended school at Coláiste Mhuire in the city centre, before moving to Phibsborough in Dublin. He is married with four children.
