= Blackrock Clinic =

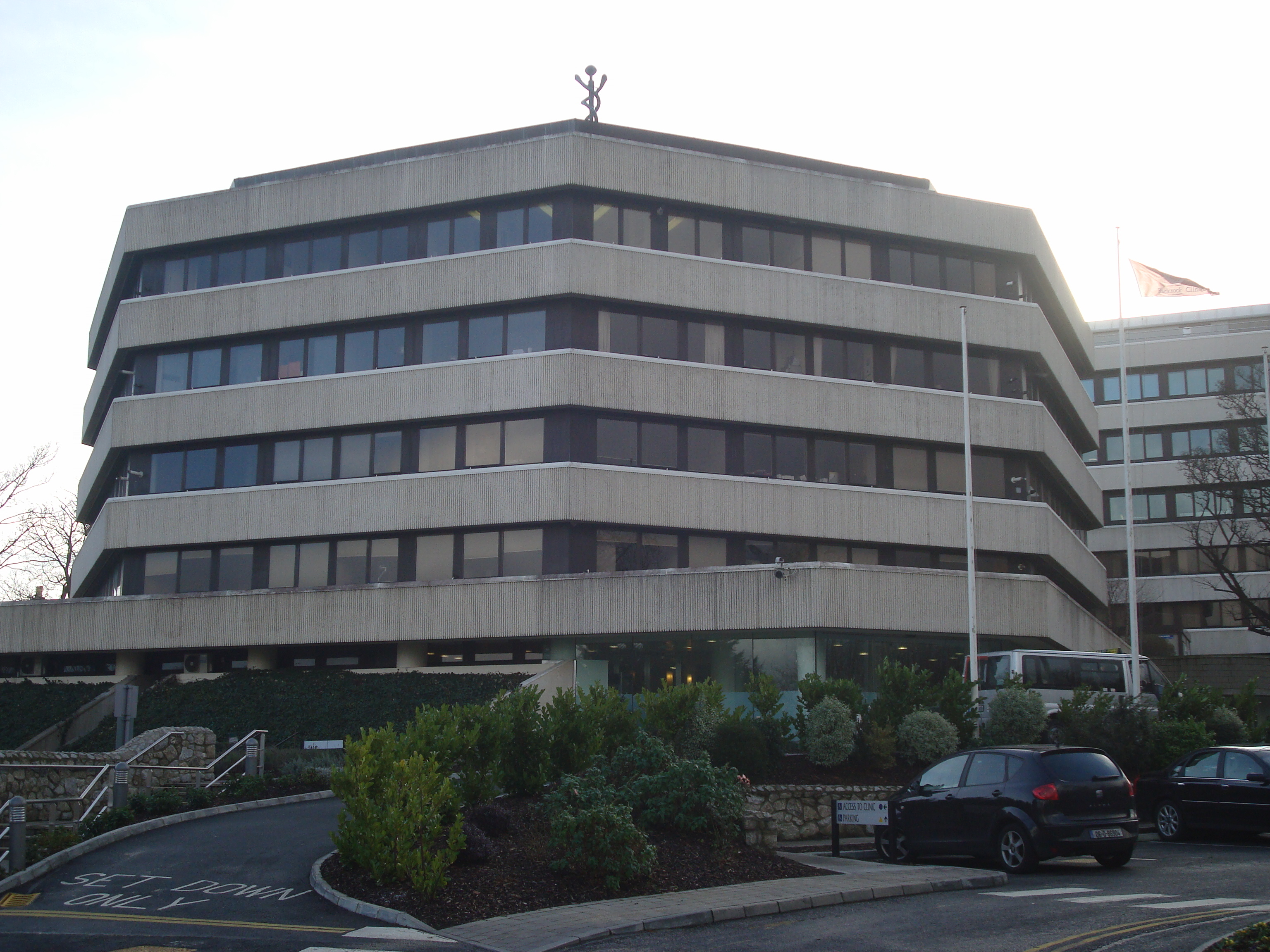
- Blackrock Clinic

- Shown in Dublin

Geography
- Location: Blackrock, Dublin, Ireland
- Coordinates: 53.303910°N 6.187943°W

Organisation
- Care system: Private
- Type: General

History
- Founded: 1986

Links
- Website: www.blackrock-clinic.ie
- Lists: Hospitals in the Republic of Ireland

Blackrock Clinic (Irish: Clinic na Carraige Duibhe) is a private hospital in Blackrock, Dublin. It is associated with both the Royal College of Surgeons in Ireland and University College Dublin.

== History ==
The hospital was founded by surgeons Joseph Sheehan, his brother Jimmy Sheehan, Maurice Neligan and Nuclear Medicine Specialist George Duffy as a private, high-tech hospital offering healthcare to private patients, in 1986. In September 2010, the clinic completed a €100 million extension to the existing hospital facility.

== Services ==
Blackrock Clinic has over 300 consultants registered representing over 40 medical specialties. The hospital has been awarded the Joint Commission International (JCI) accreditation. It has contracts with all the main Irish health insurance companies as well as being available to private self paying patients.
