= Áine Lawlor =

21st-century Irish journalist

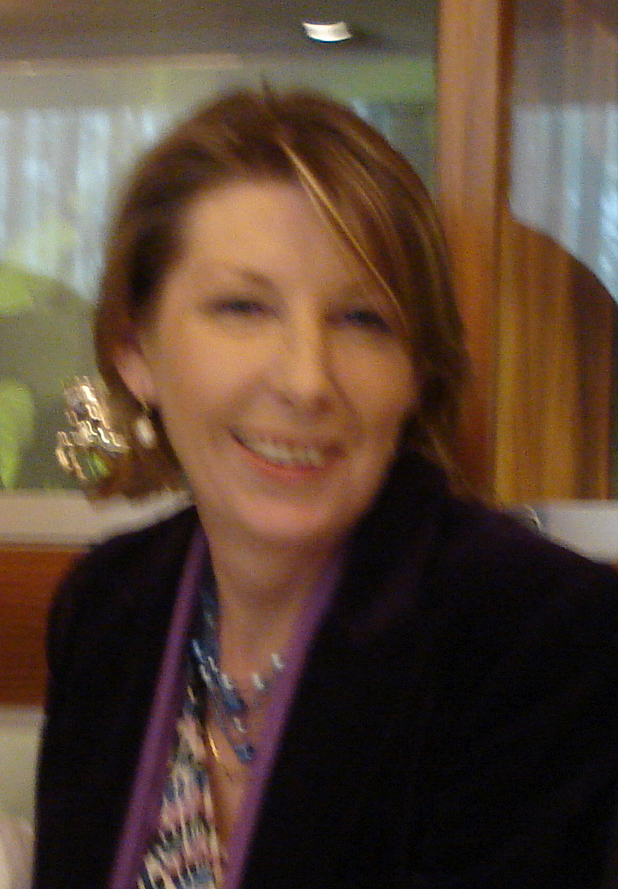
- Áine Lawlor in 2009
- Born: 1961 (age 64–65); Coolock, Dublin, Ireland
- Education: Trinity College Dublin
- Occupations: Journalist, broadcaster
- Notable credit: Morning Ireland
- Spouse: Ian Wilson
- Children: 4

Áine Lawlor (born 1961) is an Irish radio and television broadcaster who has hosted many shows on RTÉ Radio 1. She has worked on various news and current affairs radio and television programmes, including Morning Ireland, News at One, The Week in Politics, Today with Pat Kenny, Today at 5, The Nature of Things, Tuesday File, Today Tonight, The Marian Finucane Show, and One to One.

Lawlor has been described as one of Ireland's "sharpest, most experienced broadcasters".

== Career ==
Lawlor attended Manor House School, Raheny. She graduated from Trinity College Dublin in 1984 having spent time as President of the Students' Union.

She moved to arts administration, before going to RTÉ as a radio announcer in 1984. She went on to be a trainee journalist. In radio, she worked on Today with Pat Kenny, Today at 5 and RTÉ 2fm News. In television, she has worked on The Nature of Things, Tuesday File, and Today Tonight. She was also a narrator of States of Fear, a programme on abuse in residential institutions.

=== Morning Ireland ===
For 30 years Lawlor co-presented Morning Ireland, Ireland's most listened to radio programme which has been on air since 1984. Lawlor presented the programme non-continuously between 1995 and 2025. She has interviewed, amongst others, ESB union boss David Naughton, US Democratic official Samantha Power, and Harald zur Hausen, Nobel Laureate and the first doctor to prove that cervical cancer was caused by a virus. It was Lawlor's voice that first informed morning radio listeners on the island of Ireland that all international Irish pork products had been recalled in December 2008. This was particularly unusual because her voice (and the Morning Ireland theme tune) was heard on the airwaves on Sunday, despite the show being scheduled to air on weekday mornings only. The Irish Independent described the occurrence as "a kind of a War of the Worlds moment", with nobody able to recall the show being broadcast on a Sunday before, and speculation mounting that the sound of the theme music must signal a major death or nuclear war. When former minister for agriculture Brendan Smith promised free cheese for the masses her interview with him made worldwide headlines.

On 14 October 2011, Lawlor announced on air at the end of Morning Ireland that she had cancer and would be stepping back from presenting the programme: "That's all from me for a while as I'm taking a break for medical treatment. Thanks to all of you who have listened over the past 16 years." She returned to Morning Ireland in 2012, but moved to News At One in the re-shuffle brought about by Pat Kenny's departure from the station the following year. Her final day presenting Morning Ireland was on the 24th of September 2025.

=== One to One ===
Lawlor also presented on an intermittent basis One to One, a current affairs interview programme on RTÉ One. She spent one interview with Libertas Institute leader, Declan Ganley, "looking over the top of her glasses at him, utterly determined to put a halt to his gallop, and still he kept on coming" according to one reviewer. Another review from the Independent group claimed that, in her interview with academic Samantha Power, Lawlor "allowed Power to drone on in that earnest and humourless way peculiar to people who think that what they have to say is of grave global import".

=== The Week In Politics ===
She hosted the programme between 2011 and 2026. She retired from RTÉ on 12 July 2026.

== Personal life ==
Lawlor currently lives in Dublin with her husband Ian Wilson, and her four children. Her husband is also a well known producer in RTÉ 2fm. Her interests include gardening and growing and cooking her own food. She does yoga and Pilates twice a week.

Lawlor was presented with the Trinity College Alumni Award in 2008.

Lawlor featured in the RTÉ Television production 'Keys to my life' which was broadcast on 19 September 2021.
