= Gaeltarra Éireann =

Former Irish industrial development agency

Gaeltarra Éireann (Irish pronunciation: [ˈɡeːl̪ˠt̪ˠaɾˠə ˈeːɾʲən̪ˠ]) was an Irish state industrial development agency established under the Gaeltacht Industries Act 1957 specifically for the Gaeltacht – the Irish-speaking areas of Ireland. Gaeltarra Éireann followed on from the Department of the Gaeltacht that had been initiated to coordinate Gaeltacht affairs when the new boundaries were drawn up for the reduced size Gaeltacht in 1956.

Gaeltarra Éireann was replaced in 1980 by the newly formed agency Údarás na Gaeltachta.

== History ==
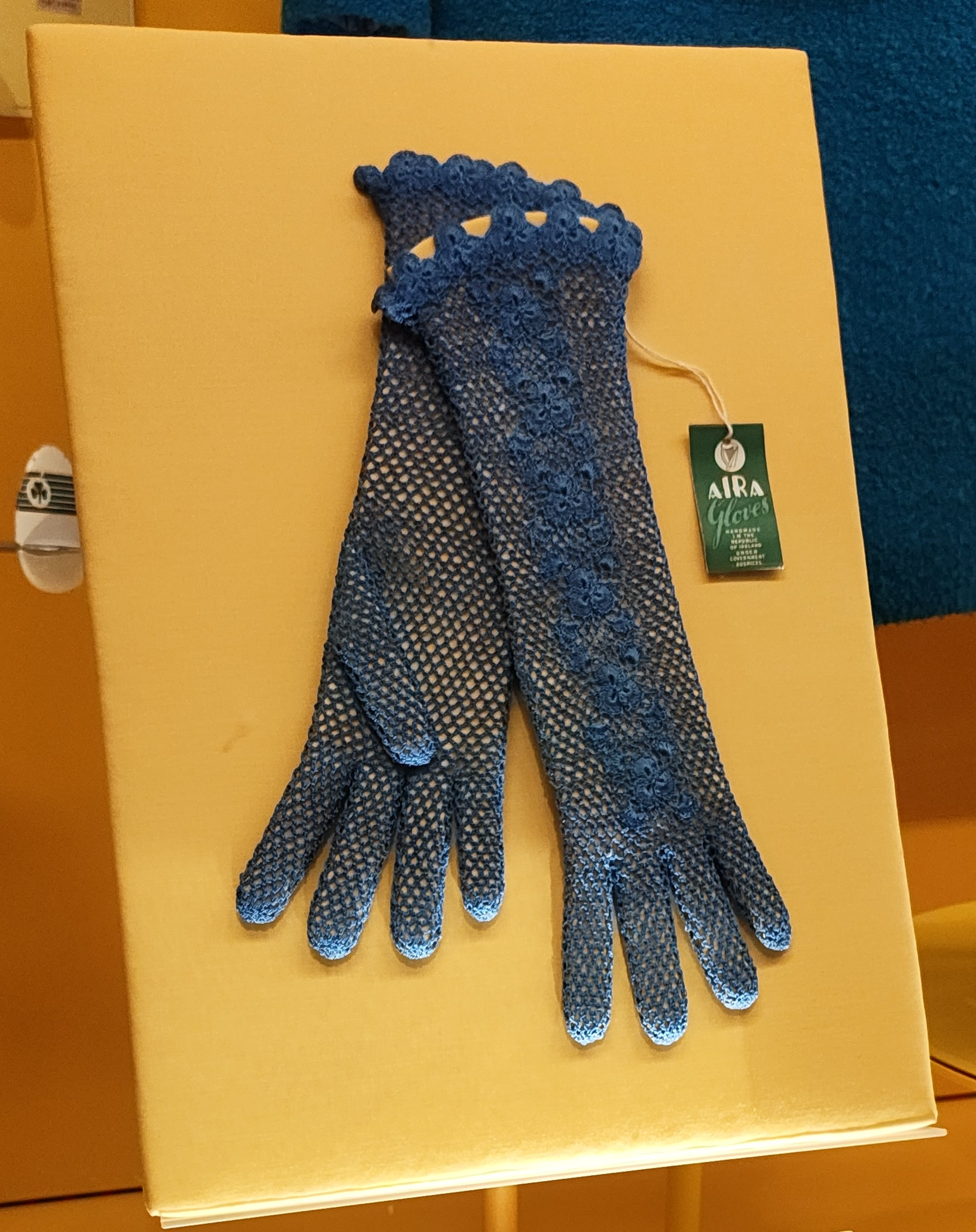
Aira Gloves on display in the National Museum of Ireland, Collins Barracks as an example of work produced under the auspices of Gaeltarra Éireann

Gaeltarra's approach to the task at hand was centred on the belief that there had to be some sort of an urban focus in the Gaeltacht, something that would attract inward industrial investment and keep young people in the area. It created two major industrial estates, one at Derrybeg in northwestern County Donegal, and another around Spiddal in southwestern County Galway. Initially, this was controversial, as Crolly, County Donegal and Toormakeady, County Mayo already had successful industries, and were established economic bases. Gaeltarra Éireann stated that it picked these two locations as they were, according to the census, the strongest districts linguistically (in terms of Irish), and they sought to "raise the flag" as it were and possibly encourage other people in slightly weaker Gaeltacht areas to continue to speak the language. In terms of creating jobs these schemes were relatively successful. They attracted business into small rural communities on the western fringes of Europe, in areas that had previously been suffering from a long-term economic decline and depopulation.

However, it is now viewed that despite all this Gaeltarra Éireann failed in perhaps its most fundamental objective - to safeguard the use of the Irish language as the main community language in the Gaeltacht.
