= Anna Ní Ghallachair =

Irish academic and scholar

Anna Ní Ghallachair (Anne Gallagher) is an Irish academic and scholar, noted for her work on the teaching of Irish and her roles as chairperson of Údarás na Gaeltachta and TG4.

== Academic career ==
A native of Arranmore, County Donegal, Ní Ghallachair taught English in the universities of Bordeaux and Rennes, and both Irish and English at Brest. She lectured in modern European languages (French and German) and Irish at Letterkenny Institute of Technology for around a decade, and later worked at the National University of Ireland, Maynooth for 26 years, including more than 20 years as director of the Language Centre. The centre later developed into the Centre for Irish Language (Research, Teaching and Testing). She was for a time the head of the School of Celtic Studies. She retired from Maynooth in January 2021. A conference in recognition of her work at Maynooth, particularly around the teaching and assessment of Irish, and plurilingualism, with a range of expert speakers, was held in October 2021.

== Other roles ==
Ní Ghallachair was chairperson of Údarás na Gaeltachta from 2013 for two full terms to 15 January 2023. In November 2022, Ní Ghallachair was appointed chairperson of the TG4 Board, succeededing Siún Ní Raghallaigh, who was appointed chairperson of the RTÉ Board. She also served on the State's Coimisiún na Gaeltachta and an advisor to Ireland's Language Education Policy Working Group.

She was president of the Irish Association of Applied Linguistics and a member of the executive committee of the Association of Language Testers in Europe.

== Recognition ==
She was made a Chevalier dans l’Ordre des Palmes académiques by the French state.

== Selected bibliography ==
- Living Language: aspects of linguistic contact and identity (ed.), Dublin, 1997
- Language Education in Ireland: current practice and future needs (eds. with ga:Muiris Ó Laoire), Dublin, 2006
