= CONCOS =

Organisation for Irish language summer colleges in Ireland

Comhchoiste Náisiúnta na gColáistí Samhraidh is a national federation of 47 Irish language summer colleges for second-level students both inside and outside the main Gaeltachtaí in Ireland. The organisation's name is usually abbreviated to CONCOS. They are based in Leitir Móir. They advocate on behalf of the Irish language summer colleges sector in Ireland.
