= Scottish Gaelic Wikipedia =

Scottish Gaelic–language edition of Wikipedia

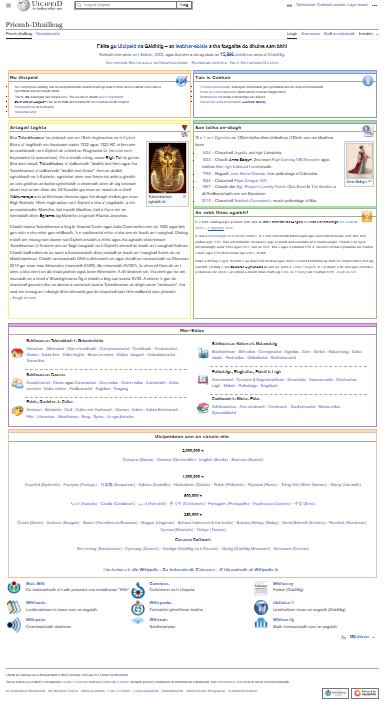
- Screenshot
- Website type: Internet encyclopedia project
- Available in: Scottish Gaelic
- Owner: Wikimedia Foundation
- Website: http://gd.wikipedia.org/
- Commercial: No
- Registration: Optional
- Launched: 2004; 22 years ago
- Content license: Creative Commons Attribution/ Share-Alike 4.0 (most text also dual-licensed under GFDL); Media licensing varies

The Scottish Gaelic Wikipedia (Scottish Gaelic: Uicipeid, [ˈuçkʲɪpetʲ]) is the Scottish Gaelic version of Wikipedia. As of 19 September 2026, it contains 16,063 articles and has 32,784 editors.

== History ==
The encyclopedia was founded in 2004. In 2017, Susan Ross was hired by the National Library of Scotland (NLS) to develop and promote the encyclopedia, a part time position that lasted 12 months. The NLS intended to augment its Gaelic resources following a digitization drive that put Gaelic-language materials on the Internet. Ross is a second-language speaker of Gaelic who learned the language as a teenager and completed a doctorate in Gaelic studies. She has been editing Uicipeid since 2010. Working with community groups, she created help pages and worked to attract more editors. The grant was sponsored by Wikimedia UK and Bòrd na Gàidhlig.

At one point, Sabhal Mòr Ostaig offered a module teaching students how to edit Uicipeid.

== See also ==
- Irish Wikipedia
- Welsh Wikipedia
- Breton Wikipedia
