= Breton Wikipedia =

Breton-language edition of Wikipedia

- Website type: Internet encyclopedia project
- Available in: Breton
- Headquarters: Miami, Florida
- Owner: Wikimedia Foundation
- Website: https://br.wikipedia.org/
- Commercial: No
- Registration: Optional
- Users: 34,786
- Launched: June 2004
- Content license: Creative Commons Attribution/ Share-Alike 4.0 (most text also dual-licensed under GFDL); Media licensing varies

The Breton Wikipedia (Breton: Wikipedia e brezhoneg) is the Breton language version of Wikipedia, run by the Wikimedia Foundation.

== History ==
The Breton Wikipedia was established in June 2004. As of August 2008 it had over 20,000 articles, making it the 56th largest Wikipedia by article count. It reached 30,000 articles on 25 October 2009, ranking 51st out of the 250 Wikipedia editions. As of February 2010, it had over 31,000 articles, making it the 52nd largest Wikipedia by article count, and as of April 2011, it had over 37,000 articles, making it the 52nd largest Wikipedia by article count. In July 2014, the encyclopedia reached 50,000 articles, becoming the 71st largest Wikipedia by article count. On 1 January 2017 it had just over 60,000 articles, making it the 73rd largest Wikipedia by article count. In June 2023, the encyclopedia reached 80,000 and reached the milestone of 90,000 articles in summer of 2024. It is also the second largest Wikipedia edition in a Celtic language, after the Welsh Wikipedia but ahead of the Irish Wikipedia (even though that language has far more speakers).

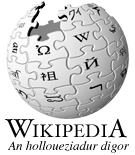
2006 version logo

The articles are written in the Peurunvan orthography. Some Diwan students contributed founding Wikipedian clubs.

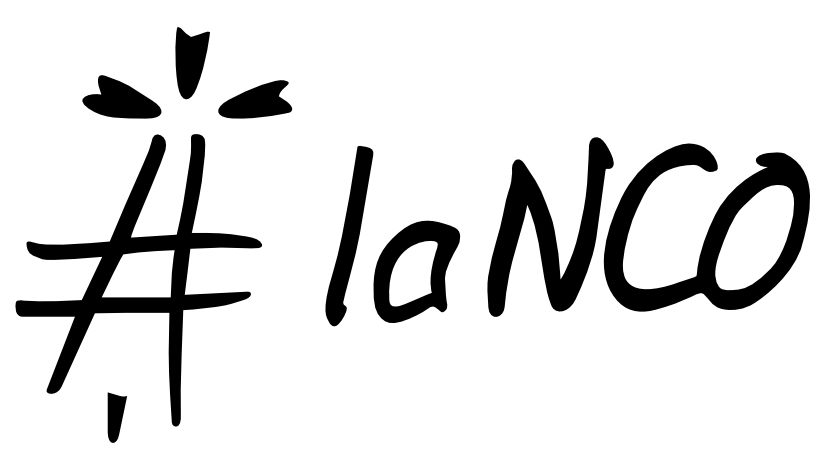
Non-Cabale de l'Ouest has helped also with the development of the Breton Wikipedia

== See also ==
- Welsh Wikipedia
- Irish Wikipedia
- Scottish Gaelic Wikipedia
