= Paul Cunningham (journalist) =

Irish journalist and author

- Born: 1970 (age 55–56)
- Education: University College Dublin
- Occupation: Journalist
- Notable credit: RTÉ News and Current Affairs

Paul Cunningham (born 1970) is an Irish journalist and author. He is currently presents This Week on RTÉ Radio 1 and previously was the Political Correspondent for RTÉ News. He has regularly reported on conflicts, natural disasters and other matters outside the EU. He has won multiple awards for his work. Cunningham has also written two books, including Ireland's Burning.

== Career ==
=== Early career ===
Cunningham started to write articles for local newspapers in Dublin, before freelancing with The Irish Times and The Irish Press. Quickly he began to pick up freelance shifts on RTÉ Radio 1 and RTÉ 2FM as a sub-editor and news-reader. After 2 years, he was appointed to the RTÉ Newsroom as a reporter.

=== Lindsay Tribunal ===
From 1999 to 2001, Paul Cunningham reported on the infection of Irish people with haemophilia, with HIV, and with Hepatitis C from contaminated blood products. In recognition, he won "National Radio Journalist of the Year" in the ESB National Media Awards in 2000. He followed this up with a documentary exposing the practices of US-based drug firms that exported infected blood products to Ireland. The programme, Bad Blood, won an Irish Film and Television Award. He co-wrote a book, with Rosemary Daly, on the impact of contaminated blood products called A Case of Bad Blood for Poolbeg Press.

=== Foreign coverage ===
Cunningham has reported extensively from abroad. His first assignment was on the aftermath of the fall of the Berlin Wall in 1989. He followed up with reports on numerous conflicts including Northern Ireland, Bosnia, Lebanon, Kosovo, Algeria, Pakistan/Afghanistan, Guatemala, Nepal, Darfur and Chad. He has also reported on flooding in Mozambique and New Orleans; racism in South Africa; and Chile post-dictatorship.

=== Presenter ===
Cunningham has been a stand-in radio news presenter over many years for programmes such as Morning Ireland, News At One and This Week. He is a regular presenter / editor of European Parliament Report. In 2007, he presented an edition of RTÉ's current affairs interview programme One to One, in which he interviewed award-winning journalist Seymour Hersh. In 2008, after Cunningham interviewed civil servant Padraig O hUiginn for the same series, Sunday Independent columnist Brendan O'Connor compared Cunningham to the hero in US television series Columbo: "seemingly awkward, nerdy and self-effacing and merely innocently asking odd questions, while all the time letting his subject reveal himself".

=== Environment correspondent ===
As RTÉ's Environment Correspondent, between 2001 and 2010, Cunningham regularly reported on climate change. In October 2006, he reported and blogged on the melting of glaciers in Greenland for RTÉ. In 2008 Cunningham travelled to Chad to film a series of reports on the country for RTÉ. Cunningham covered the 2009 United Nations Climate Change Conference for RTÉ. He also reported from the UNFCCC meetings in Bali (2007) and Montreal (2005).

Cunningham is the author of the book Ireland's Burning, which was published in 2008. It features interviews with Irish people concerned about the environment, including weatherman Gerald Fleming, journalist Kevin Myers and Minister for the Environment, Heritage and Local Government John Gormley.

=== Documentary work ===
Cunningham has worked as a reporter and producer on several TV documentaries, apart from Bad Blood, including:

Kidnapped: Sharon Commins' hostage ordeal in Darfur - 2010

Green Gold: Search for Ireland's Green Economy - 2010

Far Away - So Close: Conflict in Guatemala - 2008

Poptarts and Chemotherapy: Robbie Dillon's story - 1998

A Noble Failure: The Bosnian War and Irish efforts to help - 1994

=== Europe correspondent ===
Cunningham has been RTÉ's Europe Correspondent, where most of the work focused on the Eurozone debt crisis. Other stories included Arrest and detention of former Bosnian Serb Commander Ratko Mladic, the 20th anniversary of the siege of Sarajevo, Greek elections, Portuguese elections, Ireland at the helm of the OSCE / Visit to Georgia - Abkhazia, horse meat contamination problems in Poland and a train crash at Santiago de Compostela.

However, he also reports on matters beyond the EU. He covered the aftermath of the 2011 Tōhoku earthquake and tsunami and resulting Fukushima I nuclear accidents in Japan for RTÉ. He had just arrived in Brussels when the disaster occurred and, not having packed enough clothes, he raided the apartment of colleague Tony Connelly, before setting off, first to Paris, then on to Tokyo.

In 2014 he broadcast a series of reports from Iran, as the provisional nuclear deal with the West came into operation.

=== Political correspondent ===
He served as Political Correspondent for RTÉ News and Current Affairs from 2018 to 2025.

=== Hat ===
In January 2010 Cunningham became known for his choice of hat which, according to the journalist himself via Twitter, is from "Pakistan's tribal areas". He wore the hat during a live television news report for RTÉ outside Government Buildings during the January 2010 weather emergency in Europe. The hat has been described variously as a "woolly pancake", an "Aran Smurf’s hat" and "stylish, in a French pastry kind of way". A Facebook group dedicated to the hat had more than one thousand fans within hours of the hat's television debut. Observers noted that Cunningham's hat did indeed resemble a pakul, a traditional men's hat worn in the Chitral and Gilgit regions of Pakistan. Some of these fans met up outside Government Buildings wearing their own hats in a similar manner. RTÉ.ie even referenced the hat in their own weather updates. The hat was auctioned for GOAL on radio programme Mooney on 21 January 2010 to raise funds for the 2010 Haiti earthquake appeal: the hat was purchased after some "frenzied bidding" for €570 by a member of "We love Paul Cunningham's winter hat" Facebook society. Cunningham had responded after Derek Mooney said he would auction his own jumper on air.
