= Gerald Barry (Irish journalist) =

Irish political journalist (1947–2011)

- Born: 18 June 1947; County Dublin, Ireland
- Died: 14 March 2011 (aged 63)
- Education: Honours degree in politics and economics (University College Dublin)
- Occupation: Political journalist
- Notable credit(s): RTÉ News/Features editor, Sunday Tribune deputy editor, This Week presenter/editor

Gerald Barry (18 June 1947 – 14 March 2011) was an Irish political journalist and broadcaster. He worked for public service broadcaster RTÉ and the Sunday Tribune newspaper, during which time he became known for his "highly probing", "highly intelligent", "quite rigorous", "clinical, even forensic but never discourteous" interviewing style.

Barry was born in Dublin and reared in Clontarf. His parents were Brian and Stella (née O'Driscoll) Barry. His parents and sister died before him, but his brother survives him. He was educated at Scoil Lorcáin and Belvedere College. At Belvedere he played cricket. He studied at University College Dublin (UCD) in the mid-1960s, achieving honours in politics and economics, but being disrupted by illness before returning to rise as auditor of the university's Literary and Historical Society.

Barry started working for RTÉ News during the 1970s, reporting on events such as the Falklands War and the political careers of taoisigh Garret FitzGerald and Charles Haughey. In 1978, he became News/Features deputy editor and, later, editor. He spent 11 years as deputy editor of and political correspondent for the Sunday Tribune from 1983 onwards.

In 1995, he began to work for the radio programme This Week. He edited and presented This Week on RTÉ Radio 1 until one year before his death from a series of brain haemorrhages resulting from an illness at the age of 63 in 2011. His death led to numerous political tributes, including from Garret FitzGerald and party leaders Eamon Gilmore, Gerry Adams and Micheál Martin, as well as from broadcasters Vincent Browne and Sam Smyth.

Barry organised the Tom Kettle seminar which, in 2006, turned out to be Conor Cruise O'Brien's last public speaking appearance. (Kettle was O'Brien's uncle by marriage.)

== Personal life ==
Barry dated Mary Harney for a time. His interests included Gaelic football and association football, supporting Manchester United F.C., literature and music, in particular Bob Dylan.
