= Ted Crosbie =

Irish newspaper publisher (1931–2022)

- Born: 30 April 1931; Montenotte, Cork, Ireland
- Died: 9 October 2022 (aged 91); St Luke's Nursing Home, Blackrock, Cork, Ireland
- Resting place: St. Finbarr's Cemetery, Glasheen, Cork, Ireland
- Education: Christian Brothers College, Cork; University College Cork
- Occupations: Businessman, publisher
- Spouse: Gretchen Kelleher (m. 1960; died 1996)
- Children: 6

Thomas Edward Crosbie (30 April 1931 – 9 October 2022) was an Irish businessman and newspaper publisher.

== Early life ==
Born in Cork on 30 April 1931, Ted Crosbie (as he was known) was a great-grandson of Thomas Crosbie, one of Cork's best-known businessmen who became sole proprietor of The Cork Examiner in 1872. He was educated at Christian Brothers College, Cork and later received a BSc from University College Cork in 1952.

== Business career ==
Following in the footsteps of his own father, also named Thomas, Ted Crosbie joined The Cork Examiner on a full-time basis after completing his university studies, having earlier worked there during his schooldays and summer holidays. He was sent to Sweden for nine months of work experience in the paper mills which supplied the newspaper group.

Crosbie rose to the position of Technical Director and was responsible for the changeover to web offset printing in 1976. A decade later he oversaw the introduction of a computerised system. Crosbie w as chief executive until 1993. He later was vice-chair of Thomas Crosbie Holdings.

== Personal life and death ==
Crosbie met Gretchen Kelleher at a dance during Easter 1959 and they were married a year later. The couple had six children. Crosbie's wife was killed in a road traffic accident near Abbeyleix in October 1996. A daughter, Suzanne, also predeceased him in December 2007.

Crosbie died after a brief illness at St. Luke's Home in Cork, on 9 October 2022, at the age of 91.
