= Údarás na Gaeltachta =

Irish state agency for the socioeconomic and cultural reinforcement of the Gaeltacht

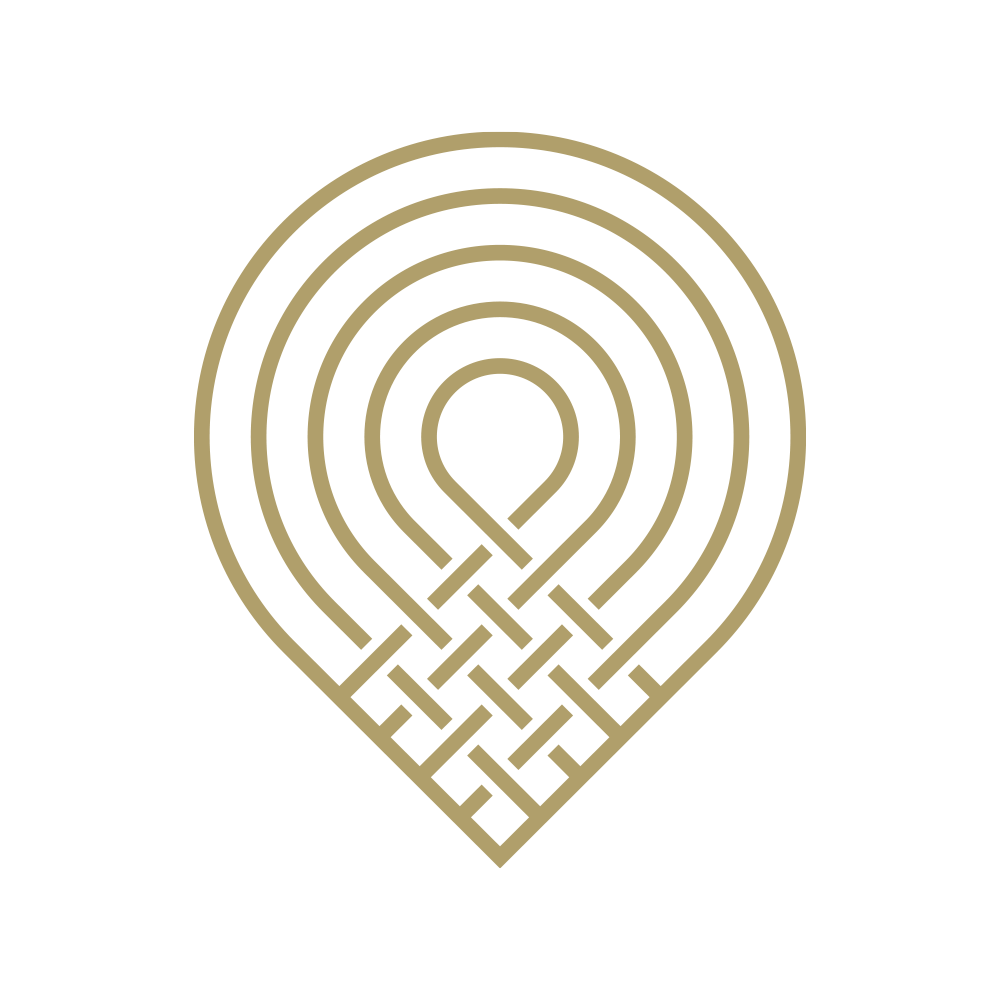
- Abbreviation: ÚnaG
- Formation: 1 January 1980
- Founder: IDA Ireland
- Type: Industrial development Irish language
- Headquarters: Furbo, County Galway, Ireland
- Location: Ireland
- Region served: Gaeltacht
- Cathaoirleach: Anna Ní Ghallachair
- Website: udaras.ie

Údarás na Gaeltachta (Irish pronunciation: [ˈuːd̪ˠəɾˠaːsˠ n̪ˠə ˈɡeːl̪ˠt̪ˠəxt̪ˠə]; meaning "Gaeltacht Authority"), abbreviated UnaG, is a regional state agency which is responsible for the economic, social and cultural development of Irish-speaking (Gaeltacht) regions of Ireland. Its stated purpose is to strengthen the Gaeltacht communities, to increase the quality of life of its community members and facilitate the preservation and extension of the Irish language as the principal language of the region. It gives funding to small local businesses that have to compete with foreign companies.

== History ==
It was established in 1980 under the Údarás na Gaeltachta Act 1979, superseding its predecessor Gaeltarra Éireann which had been established in 1958 under the Gaeltacht Industries Act 1957.

It has a strong role in attracting enterprise into Gaeltacht areas, many of which are isolated and economically disadvantaged. The European Union grant-aid is often provided to indigenous startup companies. They are also involved in the setting up of community co-operatives and employment schemes.

== Governance ==
Údarás na Gaeltachta has a 12-member board. In accordance with the Údarás na Gaeltachta Act 1979, as amended by the Gaeltacht Act 2012, the minister with responsibility for the Gaeltacht appoints the board members for a period not exceeding five years, five of these on the nomination of county councils from counties which include Gaeltacht areas.

The head office of Údarás na Gaeltachta is in Furbo, County Galway, with regional offices in Derrybeg, County Donegal, Belmullet County Mayo, Dingle, County Kerry and Ballymakeera, County Cork. The current chairperson is Anna Ní Ghallachair from Arranmore, County Donegal.

=== Elected and appointed members ===
Some members of the board are appointed by the Minister for Rural and Community Development and the Gaeltacht. The rest represent specific Gaeltacht areas. From 1979 to 2012, the latter were directly elected by Gaeltacht residents using the single transferable vote; since 2012, they have been nominated by county councils, usually from among the councillors themselves. The areas, and number of board members representing them, have been as follows:

Number of members of Údarás na Gaeltachta
Selector	1979–1999	1999–2012	Since 2012
Donegal	2	4	1
Galway	3	6	1
Mayo	3	2	1
Meath	3	1	1
Cork	2	1	1
Waterford	2	1	1
Kerry	2	2	1
All areas	7	17	5
Minister	6	3	7
Total	13	20	12
