= Richard Crowley (journalist) =

Irish journalist (born 1959)

- Occupation: Journalist
- Notable credit(s): RTÉ News; Prime Time

Richard Crowley (born 1959), is an Irish journalist and broadcaster. He was formerly Middle East Correspondent for RTÉ News, and co-presenter of the current affairs programme Prime Time on RTÉ television. Prior to leaving RTÉ in 2017, he had presented the News at One on RTÉ Radio One and co-presented the radio programme This Week, with Colm Ó Mongáin, on Sundays.

== Career ==
Crowley began his journalistic career in the Derry Journal in 1976. During the 1980s, he was a reporter and news presenter on RTÉ television. He also presented a news feature programme called Radharc. He later moved to RTÉ Radio where he presented Morning Ireland for six years, and the RTÉ News at One.

He returned to RTÉ TV News, in 2001, as the Middle East correspondent reporting from the region until 2009. His book, No Man's Land, was published in October 2007. In 2009, he began presenting a new television series on RTÉ about Irish business and finance, called The Smart Money. From June 2009, he presented and edited This Week on RTÉ Radio 1. Crowley began co-presenting Prime Time in 2010, and resigned from that role in 2012. He presented the News at One on Radio 1 and This Week on RTÉ radio until he resigned from RTE in December 2017.

In 2015 he was named News Broadcaster of the Year at the Irish annual radio broadcasting awards, the PPIs.
