= Tuairisc.ie =

Online Irish language news service

- Type: Online newspaper
- Owner: Tuairisc Bheo Teoranta
- Editor: Seán Tadhg Ó Gairbhí
- Staff writers: Méabh Ní Thuathaláin, Pádraic Ó Ciardha
- Founded: 2014
- Headquarters: Bearna, County Galway, Ireland
- Website: tuairisc.ie

Tuairisc.ie is an online Irish language newspaper. The company's offices are in Bearna, County Galway, in the west of Ireland.

Tuairisc.ie receives state funding through Foras na Gaeilge.

== History ==
Tuairisc Bheo Teoranta won a competition run by Foras na Gaeilge to provide an Irish language news-service on-line in 2014. The offices of the newspaper were set up in Bearna in County Galway because it was the only area in the Conamara Gaeltacht that had access to highspeed broadband. Tuairisc.ie was launched in the Oak Room of the Mansion House in Dublin on 9 October 2015.

By June 2015 Tuairisc.ie had reached 1,000,000 page views. 70% of these were return visitors.

== Staff ==
Seán Tadhg Ó Gairbhí is the editor of Tuairisc.ie and Ciarán Ó Súilleabháin is the website's manager. There are two full-time journalists employed by the site, Pádraic Ó Ciardha and Méabh Ní Thuathaláin, and several external contributors write regular articles, including Cathal Mac Coille and Dara Ó Cinnéide. Eoin Ó Murchú and Desmond Fennell are also contributors.

== See also ==
- Comhar
- Nós
- Vicipéid
- List of Irish-language media
