= This Week (radio series) =

Irish radio show

- Genre: News and current affairs
- Running time: One hour
- Country of origin: Ireland
- Language: English
- Home station: RTÉ Radio 1
- Recording studio: Donnybrook, Dublin
- Website: www.rte.ie/news/player/this-week/

This Week is an Irish news and current affairs radio programme broadcast on RTÉ Radio 1. It airs Sundays between 13:00 and 14:00. It claims to be Ireland's longest-running radio news programme. The programme is currently presented by Paul Cunningham.

== Content and presentation ==
Paul Cunningham presents the programme which is edited by Margaret Curley. The same team also make World Report.

David McCullagh previously worked on the programme in the 1990s prior to becoming a dedicated political reporter. The programme used to be presented by RTÉ's former political correspondent David McCullagh, former Washington-based US correspondent Carole Coleman and political reporter Justin McCarthy and was edited by former investigative reporter John Burke. That programme team was announced by RTÉ on 3 September 2018, as reported in the Irish Independent and The Irish Times.

The programme's previous presenters were Brian Dowling and Colm Ó Mongáin. The programme was edited and presented for many years by Gerald Barry. Other presenters in the past included the national broadcaster's former Middle East Correspondent Richard Crowley, Michael Good, Paul Maguire, Gavin Jennings and Sean O'Rourke.

The show has in-depth interviews, news packages and foreign coverage. Lengthened editions are also aired on the occasion of major breaking news stories such as general elections or referendums.

== Awards ==
In June 2018, John Burke and Colm Ó Mongáin were awarded the Law Society of Ireland's Justice Media Award (broadcast and radio) for an investigation and analysis into under-resourcing of GSOC (Garda Síochána Ombudsman Commission), the Irish national policing investigation agency. The citation, published on the Law Society website, read: "An excellent example of detailed investigative reporting, bringing previously unpublished information to the public attention and providing incisive analysis of the difficulties involved".
