= Ulick McEvaddy =

Irish businessman

Ulick McEvaddy (born 1952) is an Irish aviation entrepreneur and former Irish army officer from Swinford, County Mayo.

In 1984, along with his brother Desmond McEvaddy, he established Omega Air Inc; a Washington-based US Corporation that specialises in the sale and lease of aircraft. Omega Air has become one of the biggest supplier and traders of Boeing 707 in the world. Today Omega Air has developed into a group of six aviation companies whose services include spare part sales and leasing, engine overhaul and repair, aircraft sales and leasing, air-to-air re-fuelling and re-engineering of Boeing 707 series aircraft.

He owns 140 acres (0.57 km^{2}) of land west of Dublin Airport, and wishes to build a competing terminal on that land. The Dublin Airport Authority (DAA) have stated that they would not allow a competing terminal access to the Runway at Dublin Airport.

Other parties calling out for a competing Terminal include Michael O'Leary, the CEO of Ryanair. O'Leary has been known to be in strong opposition to the DAA ( previously known as Aer Rianta), on various issues.

McEvaddy is one of the main contributors to the controversial anti-Lisbon Treaty campaign group Libertas in Ireland. McEvaddy described the consortium of investors who envisaged buying out Sean Quinn's stake in the stricken Anglo Irish Bank as "heroes" of an "economic war".
