= Maurice Neligan =

Irish heart surgeon and journalist

- Born: 1937 Booterstown
- Died: 8 October 2010
- Occupation: Surgeon

Maurice Neligan (1937 – 8 October 2010) was an Irish heart surgeon, activist, newspaper columnist and media commentator. He was considered one of Ireland's most recognisable doctors – "Ireland's answer to Dr Christian Barnard [sic]" – and performed a number of firsts in Irish medicine. It is thought that he performed 14,000 – 15,000 heart operations during his career. After his death in 2010, Fine Gael leader Enda Kenny described him as "the first superstar of Irish medicine".

== Professional career ==
He studied medicine at UCD in 1955. There he won the Ambrose Birmingham gold medal in anatomy (1959), and graduated B.Sc.(honours) (1959) and MB, B.Ch. and BAO (1962). He also won the Mater hospital's surgical gold medal (1962), and later gained an M.Sc. at UCD in anatomy and physiology. In 1974, Neligan performed Ireland's first open-heart surgery for congenital heart defects. In 1975, he performed Ireland's first coronary artery by-pass graft. In 1985, he carried out the first heart transplant in the country's history, and was given no assistance by the Department of Health in doing so. Neligan also co-founded the Blackrock Clinic. From 1971 until 2002, he was consultant cardiac surgeon at the Mater Hospital and, from 1974 until 2002, he served at Our Lady's Children's Hospital, Crumlin, Dublin.

== Family life ==
Neligan was originally from Booterstown, County Dublin. He attended Blackrock College. He studied medicine at University College Dublin (UCD), from where he graduated successfully in 1962. He married Pat, a fellow doctor. They met in the accident and emergency unit of St Vincent's Hospital when Pat crashed her father's car on her graduation day – "I hobbled off on my crutch, and he came after me and said, would you like to go out?", Pat later told Miriam O'Callaghan. The couple went on to have seven children. Three were sons and four were daughters. Daughter Sara was murdered in 2007. 12,000 letters were sent to the family by members of the public.

After his retirement from surgery Neligan maintained a public profile and contributed a column to the weekly health supplement which comes with The Irish Times. He loved to read and appreciated poetry. He became an ardent critic of government health policy and campaigned for the retention of patient services when the government threatened to cut them. In his final year he was interviewed for a book, Insights into Leadership in Ireland: Insights from Contemporary Leaders in the Public, Private and Voluntary Sectors, launched by Martin McAleese in September 2010.

After retiring Neligan was often seen in Glenbeigh, County Kerry. He died suddenly at home at the age of 73 on the morning of 8 October 2010. The day before he had met with former Blackrock College classmates for a 55th year reunion. The day after his death he had been expected to address GPs in Kilkenny. Fine Gael health spokesperson Dr. James Reilly said "medicine has lost a great pioneer and a leading thinker".

In July 2012, the Mater Foundation, together with the Neligan family, established the Maurice Neligan Tribute Fund in recognition of his great achievements during the years he served with the Mater Misericordiae University Hospital. The Mater Foundation plans to raise €700,000 from this Fund to purchase a core piece of equipment called a Zeego-CArm and thus enable the first Hybrid Theatre in a public hospital in Ireland, which will be named the Maurice Neligan Heart & Vascular Theatre.
