= Bean an tí =

Irish phrase – "woman of the house"

Bean an tí / Bean a' tí (pronounced [ˌbʲanˠ ə ˈtʲiː]; plural mná an tí) is an Irish phrase meaning "woman of the house". With the rise of Irish language education in the Gaeltacht, or Irish-speaking areas of Ireland, it has come to refer to a landlady who takes in students who wish to learn Irish in a family setting, providing lodging and meals as well as education.

== Importance in regional economy ==
Students traveling to and living in the Gaeltacht and studying with Bean an Tí have become an important source of income in these mostly rural areas. On 17 September 2000 it was reported in The Sunday Mirror that Irish college sources said a small number of Mna Tí were then accommodating up to 30 students and earning up to £30,000 a year during peak holiday periods. On 20 February 2003, Fine Gael Gaeltacht spokesperson Fergus O'Dowd called for a reduction in the tax increases that Mna Tí faced at the time, saying that Mna Ti were the heroes and protectors of the Irish language and culture. Later that year Na Mná Tí were given total tax exemption under the Irish Language Learners’ Scheme. Under this scheme there is also a grant paid by the Department to Gaeltacht households that accommodate Irish language learners, which plays a huge role in the economic life of the Gaeltacht and is worth millions to the local economy.

In March 2007, Sinn Féin councillor Pearse Doherty called for an urgent government response to the withdrawal of recognition from Coláiste an Phiarsaigh (Pearse College), the Irish language summer college in Gaoth Dobhair (Gweedore ). He was concerned about the impact on the economic well-being and cultural life of the region and in particular with the future financial welfare of Mna Tí. For 21 years, the coláiste (college) was made possible by the hard work of local Mna Tí, with around 30 local homes hosting students each summer. The decision to withdraw funding from the college could have cost the area up to €1.5m in lost revenue. A new college Coláiste Bun an Ibhir is now run by Gael-Linn in the area.

== Origin ==
Until the 1950s on St Brigid's day the Bean an Tí would pass the Brigid's cross around her body three times in front of the house. She would then walk around the house three times. Then the cross would be welcomed into the front door by the family and hung over the kitchen door, becoming the heart of the house.

== Sources ==
- Kay Kevlihan, "Mna tí - unsung heroes of Irish revival", Irish Farmers Journal Interactive, 7 August 2004,
- Fine Gael News. Speech by Fergus O'Dowd TD 20 February 2003, on the Finance Bill in Dáil Éireann (in Irish with English synopsis)
- County Donegal on the Net News, Vol.8 No.3 March 2007,
- "Gweedore area set to lose E1.5m", Donegal Post,
- Bushe, Andrew (17 September 2000). "Gaeltach in uproar over tax demands". Sunday Mirror. Archived from the original on 16 June 2011 – via FindArticles.
