= Welsh Wikipedia =

Welsh-language edition of Wikipedia

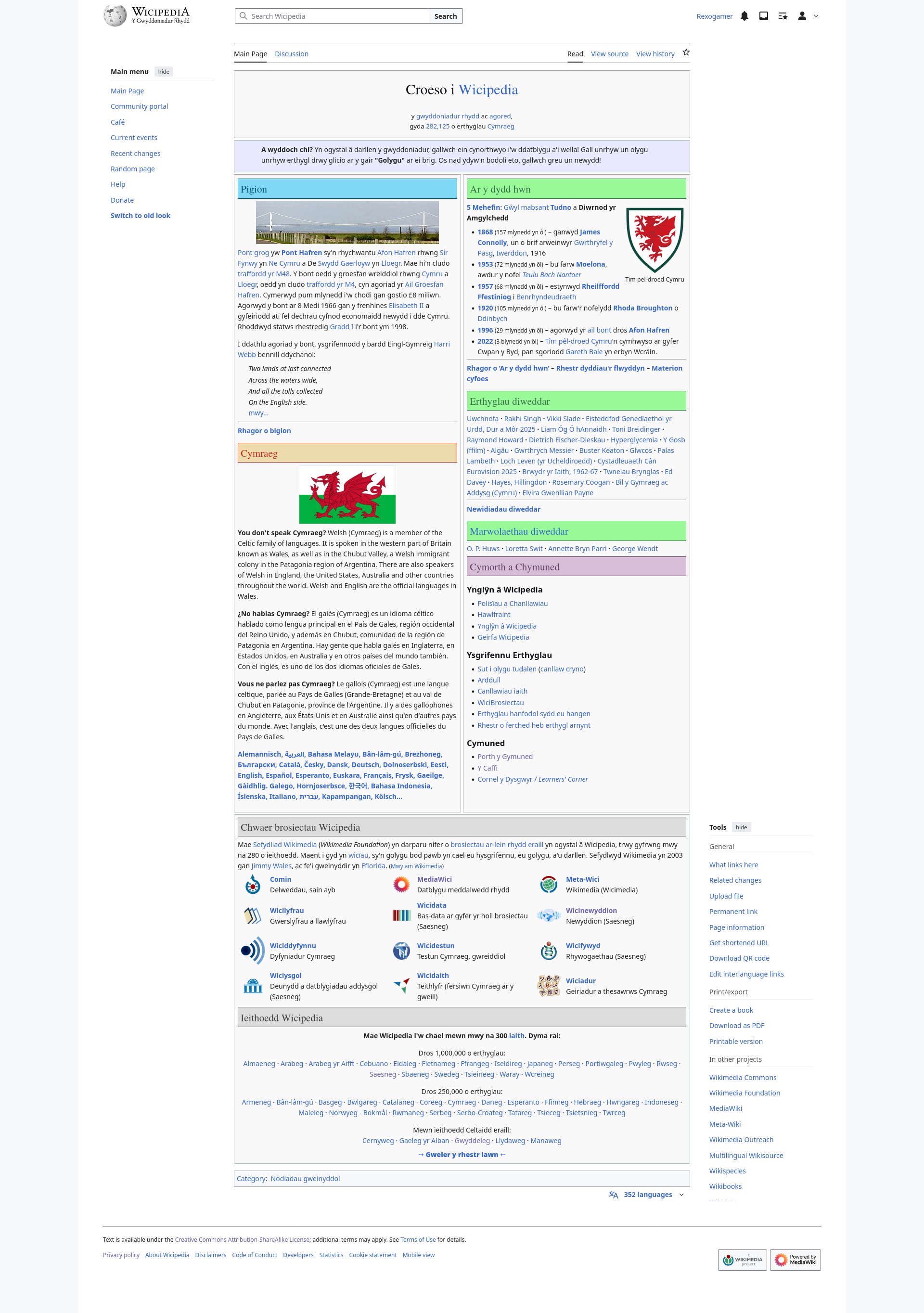
- Screenshot
- Website type: Internet encyclopedia project
- Available in: Welsh
- Headquarters: Miami, Florida
- Owner: Wikimedia Foundation
- Website: cy.wikipedia.org
- Commercial: No
- Registration: Optional
- Content license: Creative Commons Attribution/ Share-Alike 4.0 (most text also dual-licensed under GFDL); Media licensing varies

The Welsh Wikipedia (Welsh: Wicipedia Cymraeg) is the Welsh-language edition of Wikipedia. This edition was started in July 2003. On 23 June 2007, it reached 10,000 articles, the 66th Wikipedia to do so. On 20 November 2008, it attained 20,000 articles. Less than a year later, on 28 October 2009, it reached 25,000 articles. In July 2013, it reached 50,000 articles and is now the 44th largest Wikipedia edition. It is the only internet resource of its kind in Welsh and has an average of 2.7 million hits every month, making it the most popular Welsh language website. It, therefore, has an important place in Welsh language online culture.

It has been referred to in the Welsh-language current affairs magazine Golwg and Y Faner Newydd, and is listed by the National Library of Wales as a Welsh-language e-resource.

In an August 2007 interview, Jimmy Wales, co-founder of Wikipedia, used the Welsh Wikipedia as an example of the rationale for having Wikipedias in smaller languages:

Certainly within Wikipedia right now we are seeing some fairly successful projects in small European languages. You don't really need a Welsh language Wikipedia, perhaps. The number of people who speak Welsh who don't also speak English is very small and getting smaller every year. So why do we have a Welsh Wikipedia? Well, people wanted it, so they're making it. And language preservation is the main motive. It is their mother tongue and they want to keep it alive, keep its literature alive. Certainly, some of the larger small languages like Basque and Catalan have very successful projects. I definitely see that preserving parts of your language and culture through collaborative projects makes a lot of sense.

A direct link to the Welsh Wikipedia has been added to the Getting Started page of the Welsh-language version of the Mozilla Firefox web browser where it appears as the first of four recommended websites, above the National Library of Wales.

In September 2012 "Wici Cymru" was formed; this is a society whose aim is to develop Wikipedia in Wales. By October, actor Rhys Ifans had become its Patron. In 2013, it was stated translations of English Wikipedia were not allowed on the site and instead most articles are written from scratch.

In 2019, the Welsh Wikipedia was cited as one of the reasons for improvements in the handling of Welsh in Google Translate, by providing a large corpus of machine-readable Welsh text. In the same 2019 source, it was stated that the Welsh Wikipedia represents the ideological opinions of its community, it was claimed to be more supportive of separatism: for example, it classes Catalonia as a country following its 2017 declaration of independence, compared to English Wikipedia which still classes it as an autonomous community. Comparisons of the article Game of Thrones, noted the more Welsh pride present on its Welsh version of the TV show. Many of the site's editors are children learning Welsh as part of bilingual school education programmes, with many of the IP addresses banned on the site belonging to schools. However, when the site's managers visit schools and educate how to contribute to the site, the ban is usually lifted. The site uses Wikidata to develop a common source of structured data for the site.

Most of Welsh Wikipedia editors are men, like English Wikipedia, however, the Welsh-language site has a smaller gender bias than English Wikipedia, with the Welsh site having a roughly 50/50 split on male/female biographies compared to less than 20% on English Wikipedia, at the time in 2019.

In 2023, the site was credited with assisting the creation of a pronunciation map for Welsh place-names in the Welsh-language.

Welsh Wikipedia statistics
Number of user accounts	Number of articles	Number of files	Number of administrators
111,961	284,665	12,389	11

== See also ==
- Encyclopaedia Cambrensis
- Encyclopaedia of Wales
- Breton Wikipedia
