= Impact of the COVID-19 pandemic on education in the Republic of Ireland =

Irish school and university closures caused by the COVID-19 pandemic

On 12 March 2020, all schools, colleges, and childcare facilities in the Republic of Ireland were shut down in response to the COVID-19 pandemic. The shutdown resulted in the cancellation of the 2020 Leaving Certificate and 2020–2021 Junior Certificate examinations, as well as all 2020–2021 Irish language summer courses in the Gaeltacht.

== Timeline ==
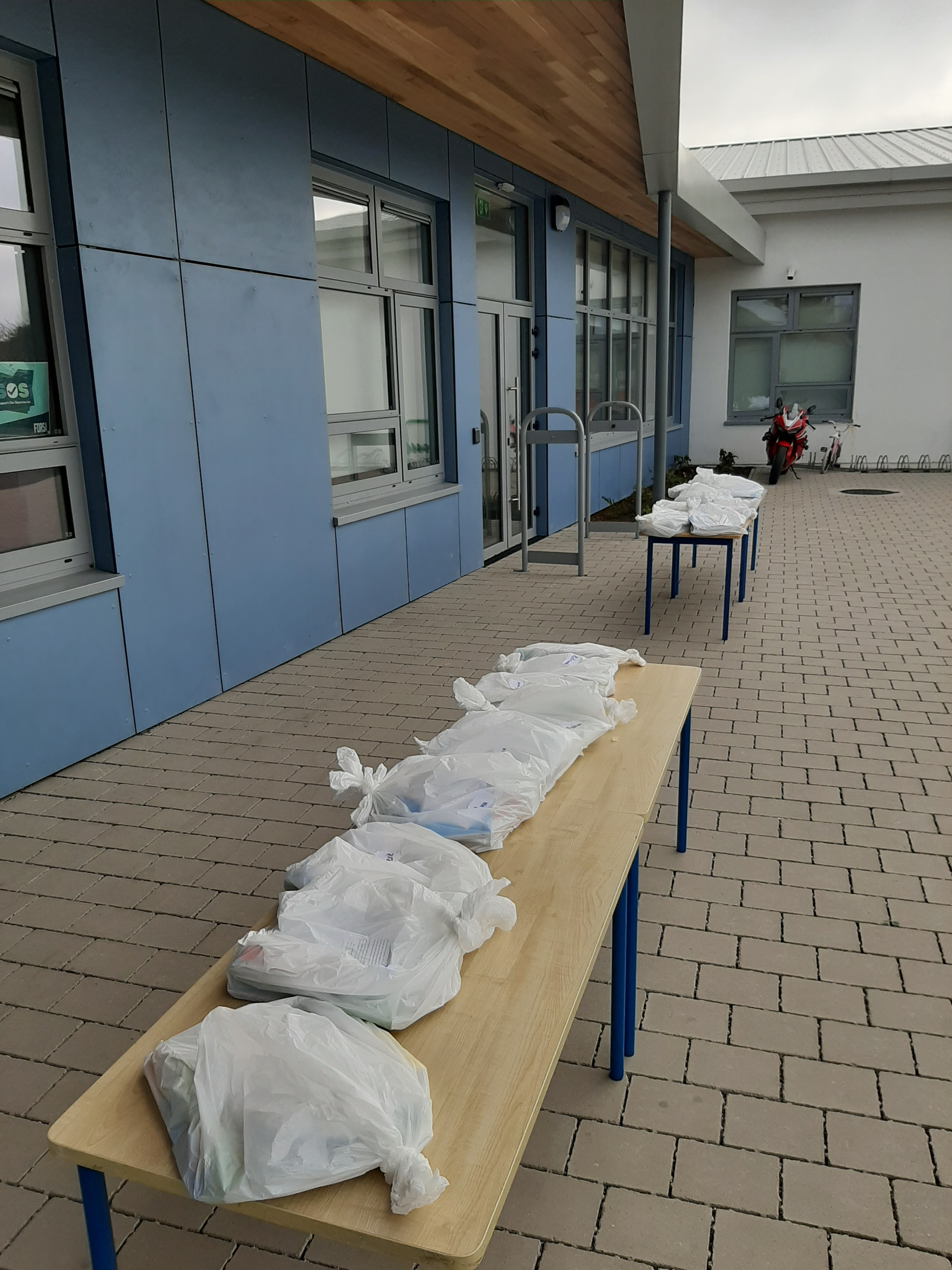
Bags of books placed for collection outside an Irish primary school

Initially, some schools around the country were closed and pupils were instructed to self-isolate.

=== 2020 ===
On 12 March, Taoiseach Leo Varadkar—speaking from Washington, D.C., where he was meeting U.S. president Donald Trump—announced the closure of all schools, colleges and childcare facilities across Ireland until at least 29 March. On 1 May, Taoiseach Leo Varadkar announced that all schools would remain closed until September 2020.

On 21 March, State broadcaster Raidió Teilifís Éireann (RTÉ) announced that it would begin showing "school" live on the television programme Home School Hub. The broadcasts began on Monday 30 March, aimed at children attending 1st–6th class of primary school (i.e. roughly 6–12 years of age).

On 24 March, Minister for Education Joe McHugh confirmed that schools would not be reopening on 30 March as had been the official deadline until then.

On 2 April, the Department of Education deferred the introduction of its "School Inclusion Model" for the allocation of Special Needs Assistants (SNAs) in schools that had been scheduled for September 2020, citing cancellations of meetings due to COVID-19 and the absence of therapists called to assist the Health Service Executive (HSE) in its battle against the pandemic. Also on 2 April, RTÉ announced it would—on weekend mornings—televise those plays of William Shakespeare on the Junior and Leaving Certificate syllabi to cater for English students at secondary school who had been prevented from attending a live theatre performance ahead of their exam.

Headfort School in Kells, County Meath, the country's only private boarding school for children receiving primary education, was forced to shut due to debts worsened by the pandemic.

With the virus affecting pupils transitioning from secondary education, Beech Hill College in County Monaghan held a drive-in ceremony to bid farewell to its departing pupils.

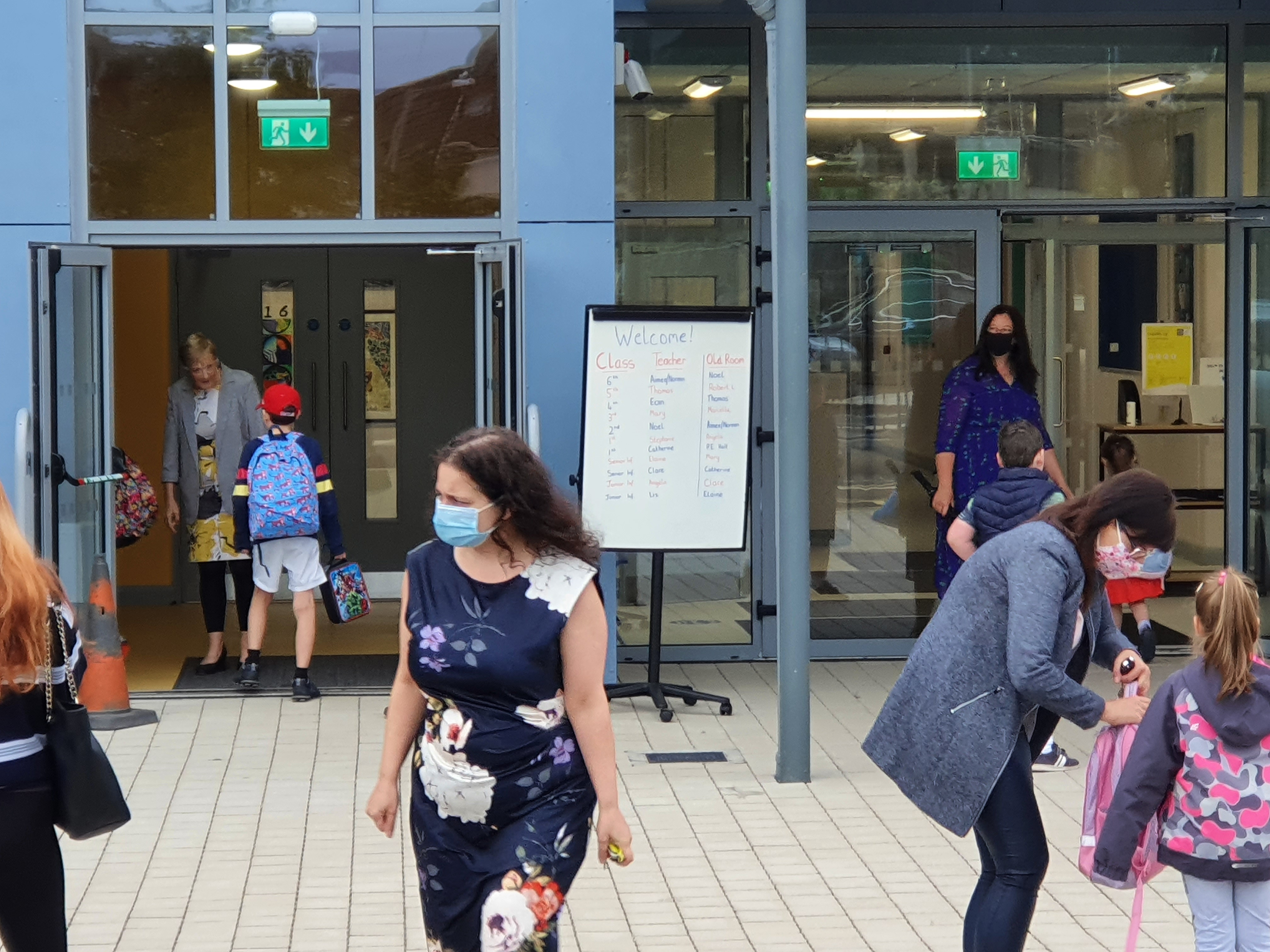
A principal and vice-principal greet returning students on the first day of school.

On 24 July, Taoiseach Micheál Martin and Minister for Education Norma Foley announced that all schools would fully reopen in August 2020.

A €376 million support package and roadmap on how to reopen all schools in Ireland was announced on 27 July which include additional teachers and special needs assistants, personal protective equipment and stepped-up cleaning regimes.

On 7 August, updated guidelines was published by the Department of Education, which stated that all teachers in both primary and secondary schools and students in secondary school would be required to wear face coverings when a physical distance of two metres could not be maintained.

On 9 October, the Department of Education announced that no decision had been made in relation to extending school closures over the mid-term break by one week, following a report from the Irish Independent which stated that the mid-term break for schools was expected to be extended.

On 11 October, speaking on RTÉ's This Week, Minister for Health Stephen Donnelly announced that there would not be an extension to the upcoming school mid-term break at the end of October.

On 17 December, Minister for Education Norma Foley announced that schools would not close early for Christmas—nor would they reopen later than planned after Christmas—as there was no evidence or recommendation from public health authorities to do so.

However, all schools remained closed after the Christmas break, following the government's announcement to move the entire country to full Level 5 lockdown restrictions.

=== 2021 ===
On 6 January 2021, the Government agreed to postpone the reopening of all schools until February 2021 with Leaving Certificate students allowed to attend school for three days a week. One day after the announcement, the Government was forced to abandon plans for Leaving Certificate students to attend school on three days a week, and instead students would return to homeschooling along with other students until February, after the Association of Secondary Teachers, Ireland (ASTI) directed its members not to return to in-school teaching.

On 19 January, the Government was forced to abandon plans to reopen special schools on Thursday 21 January for thousands of children with special educational needs following safety concerns among staff unions.

On 22 January, speaking on RTÉ's Morning Ireland, Chief Clinical Officer of the Health Service Executive (HSE) Colm Henry stated that COVID-19 transmission levels remained too high for schools to reopen in February.

On 26 January, talks between the Department of Education and unions continued with hopes that schools would be able to reopen on a phased basis between February and March.

On 1 February, the Department of Education agreed to reopen special schools with 50% capacity on Thursday 11 February and special classes in mainstream schools on Monday 22 February.

On 10 February, details of a return to in-school teaching and learning for students attending special classes in secondary schools from Monday 22 February was announced, after a deal was agreed between teacher and SNA trade unions and the Department of Education.

Under the Government's new revised Living with COVID-19 plan published on 23 February, junior and senior infants, 1st and 2nd classes, along with Leaving Certificate students returned to in-school teaching and learning from 1 March, while the rest of primary school classes and 5th Year students returned from 15 March, and 1st to 4th years returned from 12 April, after the Easter holidays.

Schools and childcare
1 March	Special schools at 100% capacity; Junior and senior infants, 1st and 2nd class to return to school; Leaving Certificate classes to return to school
8 March	Resumption of the ECCE programme and return to school of ECCE-age children
15 March	3rd, 4th, 5th and 6th class return to school; 5th years to return to school
29 March	Early learning and care, and school-age childcare services to reopen
12 April	1st to 4th years return to school

On 26 July 2021, Minister for Education Norma Foley stated that she was confident that a full reopening of schools from late August and early September would go ahead as planned.

On 25 August, a row over the return to school of teachers in early stages of pregnancy intensified after the three teacher unions condemned the Minister for Education and the Department of Education for the "failure to provide alternative time-bound working arrangements for teachers who have been ineligible to receive vaccines."

=== 2022 ===
On 4 January 2022, after meeting with public health officials and education stakeholders, Minister for Education Norma Foley confirmed that schools would reopen as planned on 6 January, despite record-breaking COVID-19 cases being reported over the Christmas period. HSE Chief Clinical Officer Dr Colm Henry said there was no public health rationale to delaying reopening of schools.

On 24 February, schools were told by the Department of Education that they could resume normal routines and normal teaching and learning activities from Monday 28 February, with social distancing and the wearing of masks no longer required.

== Confirmed cases ==
On 1 September 2020, the first day of reopening schools, a primary school class in Dublin was sent home after one pupil tested positive for COVID-19. On 2 September, a second primary school class in Dublin was sent home after a number of pupils tested positive for COVID-19. Also on 2 September, a primary school in County Clare closed for one week after a number of staff members were identified as close contacts of a case of COVID-19. On 3 September, one primary school and one secondary school in County Kerry sent a number of students home after students tested positive for COVID-19.

From 7–20 September, six cases of COVID-19 were confirmed in two counties—Cork and Westmeath—while several schools around the country closed from October 2020 due to multiple cases of COVID-19, in accordance with the Department of Education and the Health Service Executive (HSE).

On 13 September, a primary school in Rathcormac, County Cork became the third school in County Cork to confirm a case of COVID-19.

On 8 October, a secondary school in Longford announced its closure due to a confirmed case of COVID-19.

On 25 November, all staff and students at a Gaelscoil primary school in Glanmire, County Cork began restricting their movements until 8 December, after 17 cases of COVID-19 was confirmed there, resulting in the closure of the school.

On 11 December, two primary schools in Laois and Mayo closed early for the Christmas holidays due to an increase in COVID-19 cases among students.

On 16 December, all pupils at a primary school in Killorglin, County Kerry began to restrict their movements after 17 people tested positive for COVID-19.

On 1 March 2021, following another period of remote learning, a school in north Dublin confirmed a case of COVID-19 as parents received an urgent letter from the school. A secondary school in Cork confirmed a case of COVID-19 while a south Dublin school announced its closure due to a confirmed case of COVID-19 just one day after schools reopened.

On 22 March, a primary school in Carrick-on-Suir, County Tipperary closed after two positive cases of COVID-19 were confirmed. On the next day on 23 March, six classes were sent home from a primary school in County Longford after five cases of COVID-19 were confirmed, and a class was sent home following an outbreak of COVID-19 at a primary school in Dublin. On 26 March, a number of students were asked to stay at home after multiple cases of COVID-19 were confirmed at a secondary school in Limerick.

On 2 April, a COVID-19 outbreak of 15 cases was confirmed in a special school in Clontarf, Dublin.

On 23 April, a COVID-19 outbreak resulted in all Leaving Certificate students being sent home from a secondary school in Letterkenny, County Donegal.

On 27 April, a primary school in County Offaly closed following confirmation of 23 cases of COVID-19.

On 19 June, a primary school in County Offaly confirmed a suspected case of the Delta variant with the children told to self isolate at home.

After schools reopened for the 2021/2022 academic year, the HSE's lead for testing and tracing Niamh O'Beirne revealed that around 800 schools reported a positive COVID-19 case since they reopened, with 500 in primary schools and 300 in secondary schools. By 8 September, the number of children restricting their movements as a result of being designated a close contact of a COVID-19 case increased to 16,000, after more than 100 schools contacted the HSE over cases among pupils.

On 18 October, a primary school in County Wexford closed until after the mid-term break in November after 34 cases of COVID-19 were detected at the school. One day later on 19 October, a primary school in County Wicklow closed over concerns at a high incidence of COVID-19 at the school.

== Junior and Leaving Certificate 2020–21 ==
=== 2020 ===
On 19 March, Minister for Education Joe McHugh announced the cancellation of Leaving and Junior Certificate oral and practical exams, with all students given top marks. On 10 April, McHugh announced the postponement of Leaving Certificate written exams until late July/August, and that Junior Cycle examinations due to take place in June would be replaced by school-based exams and assessments held early in the new school year. On 23 April, McHugh confirmed in the Dáil that Leaving Certificate examinations would begin on 29 July. On 29 April, McHugh announced that all third-year Junior Cycle students would receive a certificate of completion and a report on achievement and that the decision to hold school-based exams and assessments early in the new school year was abandoned.

On 8 May, McHugh announced the cancellation of the Leaving Certificate examinations. A guide to calculated grades that included four layers was published online by the Department of Education on 8 May. The calculated grades system was initially rejected by the Association of Secondary Teachers, Ireland, but was later agreed after further clarification was made by McHugh.

On 16 July, new Minister for Education Norma Foley announced that Leaving Certificate results would be published on 7 September, three weeks later than usual. After the announcement, the Association of Secondary Teachers, Ireland described the way that the time of the Leaving Certificate results being released as 'disappointing'. On 26 August, Foley announced that the postponed Leaving Certificate written examinations would begin on Monday 16 November for those who couldn't get calculated grades. On 1 September, Foley announced that under 17% of Leaving Certificate grades calculated by schools would be reduced and 4% would be increased. On 2 February 2021, over 2,000 students who sat the postponed written Leaving Certificate exams in November 2020 received their results, with over 40% of the grades higher than the calculated grades students had received.

==== Grading errors ====
On 30 September, Taoiseach Micheál Martin announced that two coding errors were identified in the Leaving Certificate calculated grades system. Speaking at a press briefing at the Department of Education, Minister for Education Norma Foley apologised and announced that around 7,200 students were affected, receiving a higher grade than they should have while some students received a lower grade. On 3 October, following a review of the calculated grades system, the Department of Education confirmed that 6,100 students were affected by the errors and would receive improved grades. On the same day, Minister for Education Norma Foley announced that a third error was identified.

=== 2021 ===
On 5 February 2021, Minister for Education Norma Foley announced a new phase of planning for the Leaving Certificate examinations. On 11 February, the Association of Secondary Teachers, Ireland (ASTI) withdrew from discussions with the Department of Education on the Leaving Certificate 2021 after it said that the plan being developed would not provide a "meaningful Leaving Certificate" for students. Two days later on 13 February, the ASTI re-joined discussions with the Department of Education on the Leaving Certificate 2021 after pulling out on 11 February. On 17 February, Minister for Education Norma Foley confirmed that Leaving Certificate examinations would proceed with students given the option between a modified version of calculated grades or written exams, while Junior Certificate examinations were cancelled for a second year in a row.

On 9 March, Minister for Education Norma Foley lost her appeals against findings that two home-schooled students were unfairly excluded from the Leaving Certificate calculated grades process.

On 24 March, the State Examinations Commission and Minister for Education Norma Foley issued new guidelines to schools advising that face coverings would be required during the Leaving Certificate oral exams, which begin on Friday 26 March.

On 2 June, the Department of Education announced that Leaving Certificate results would be delayed for a second year in a row, with students to receive their results on 3 September. On 3 September, over 61,000 students received their Leaving Certificate exam results with grades significantly higher compared to 2020, with the number of students achieving H1s in some popular subjects rising by more than 7 percentage points.

On the day CAO offers released on 7 September, an error was discovered in the Leaving Certificate grading process, affecting 1,800 students who sat the Leaving Certificate Applied programme.

=== 2022 ===
On 1 February 2022, Minister for Education Norma Foley confirmed that the 2022 Leaving Certificate would be held with no accredited grades, while the Junior Cycle exam would be held for the first time since 2019.

On 8 June, more than 131,000 students began their Leaving and Junior Certificate examinations, marking the first full return to traditional written June exams in two years due to the COVID-19 pandemic.

On 23 June, the State Examinations Commission announced that Leaving Certificate results would be delayed for a third year in a row, with students to receive their results on 2 September. On 2 September, more than 61,000 Leaving Certificate students received their results, which were artificially boosted in order to comply with a commitment made by the Minister for Education earlier in the year.

== Universities ==
Trinity College Dublin cancelled lectures in March and moved to online delivery.

On 6 April, Galway's University held the first non-physical online graduation ceremonies in its history, after bringing forward the examinations of 190 medical students to send them into service in hospitals with immediate effect. Michael Ryan, the Irish-born Executive Director of the World Health Organization's Health Emergencies Programme, addressed those graduating from what was also the university where he studied. The university also held another similar online ceremony two days later. University College Cork held its first non-physical online graduation ceremony on 17 April (a date also brought forward for the same reason), with Taoiseach Leo Varadkar addressing them through a video link and asking anyone from overseas to stay in Ireland, because "everyone graduating this year" would be guaranteed an internship as a result of the virus.

In May, researchers at Galway were reported to have developed a smartphone social distancing app which set off a vibrator if people were too close to each other for too long, with it being possible to suspend the vibrator if movement is not possible.

In June, some universities either had (Galway) or were intending to (Dublin) refund rent fees to students (Galway also vowed to reduce the cost of its on-campus accommodation for the following academic year). However, Cork reduced its lease by only three weeks for the following academic year and Dublin's second university gave no comment on its intentions.

On 25 September, Minister for Further and Higher Education, Research, Innovation and Science Simon Harris announced that all higher education institutions had been asked to deliver lectures remotely where possible for the next two weeks.

In October 2020, all further and higher education institutions across the country moved classes primarily online due to Level 5 lockdown restrictions, however buildings of universities and colleges were allowed to remain open to students and staff after the government granted higher-education institutions "essential service" status under the country's Level 5 lockdown.

On 9 October, University College Cork confirmed several cases of COVID-19 amongst students in a UCC-run student accommodation.

On 16 February 2021, it was announced that two universities in Galway and Limerick had been hit by major COVID-19 outbreaks of up to nearly 250 confirmed cases due to students breaching Level 5 lockdown regulations, which caused clusters of infection involving up to 40 people.

On 3 June, speaking on RTÉ's Morning Ireland, Minister for Further and Higher Education Simon Harris stated that he expected students and staff to be back on campus for the new academic year of 2021/22.

== Other ==
The Royal Irish Academy of Music (RIAM), which had announced the cancellation of its spring and summer music exams on 12 March, announced on 8 April that it would allow online submissions of home-recorded exam performances in June 2020.

On 20 April, the Department of Culture, Heritage and the Gaeltacht announced that all summer Irish language college courses scheduled for the various Gaeltacht regions throughout the country were cancelled, with the counties of Donegal and Galway particularly affected.

In January 2021, the pandemic forced the annual Young Scientist and Technology Exhibition online for the first time.

On 7 May, the Department of Tourism, Culture, Arts, Gaeltacht, Sport and Media announced that all summer Irish language college courses in the Gaeltacht were cancelled for a second year running.

On 22 September, following advice from Chief Medical Officer Tony Holohan, asymptomatic primary school children and those in childcare facilities identified as close contacts of a confirmed case of COVID-19 would no longer have to restrict their movements or get tested from Monday 27 September.

== See also ==
- COVID-19 pandemic in the Republic of Ireland
- Education in the Republic of Ireland
- Impact of the COVID-19 pandemic on education
