= Abbey Vocational School =

Non-denominational Vocational Secondary School in County Donegal, Ireland

- Scoil na Mainistreach
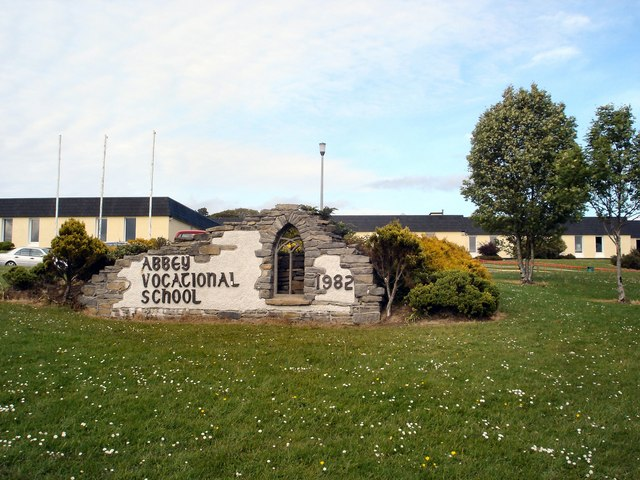

Location
- Donegal Town; Ireland; 54°38′54.8″N 8°6′47.02″W

Information
- Motto: Mol an óige from Irish saying: 'mol an óige agus tiocfaidh sí' ('praise the young and they will come with you')
- Established: Donegal Technical School (1953-1980); Abbey Vocational School (1980-present)
- Principal: Mr John O’Donnell (Previously Mr Alan Thompson)
- Maintained by: Donegal Education and Training Board
- Staff: 90
- Enrollment: 1000 (approx)
- Website: avsdonegal.com

The Abbey Vocational School (also known as the AVS or the 'Tech'; Scoil na Mainistreach in Irish, or l’École Abbey in French (formerly known as the Donegal Technical School) is a non-denominational vocational secondary school situated in Donegal, County Donegal, Ireland. It has approximately 900 students, and is the largest school run by the Donegal Education and Training Board. The school is located on the outskirts of the town and is named after the 15th-century Franciscan friary (commonly referred to as an Abbey), the ruins of which lie a few hundred metres from the school.

Courses offered include the Junior Certificate, The Leaving Certificate, Transition Year, Leaving Certificate Vocational Programme (LCVP), Leaving Certificate Applied (LCA) as well as a range of Post-Leaving Certificate courses (PLCs) It is also one of the top feeder schools for Letterkenny Institute of Technology (LYIT). Like most schools now operated by the VEC, the AVS has moved away from a strongly vocational syllabus towards a more general curriculum including modern languages and sciences. The building itself is single story with almost sixty class rooms, including general purpose, computer, science, music, engineering and drama rooms. Recent extensions have furthered the schools facilities. The school also has extensive sport facilities including grass pitches,basketball courts, gymnasium and athletic track.

== History ==
The first proper school to offer secondary education in Donegal Town was called Eske College, which existed until the 1920s when it was renamed as Fisher's High School and continued until the 1930s. It was replaced more than a decade later by Four Masters High School (Irish: Ardscoil na gCeithre Máistir), which was a fee paying school founded by F.R. Cleary and located next to the town's railway station. However, it was not until 1953 that free secondary education was made available with the establishment of the Technical School (Irish: An Cheard Scoil; known locally as the 'Tech') which was located on the Killybegs road, close to the town centre.

In 1972, the VEC took control of the town's High School, and merged it with the Technical School to create Donegal Vocational School (Irish: Gairmscoil Dhún na nGall). However, as numbers continued to expand the school became increasingly stretched and was based in eight different centres with almost 600 pupils. It was at this point a decision as taken to relocate the school to a new 14-acre (57,000 m^{2}) site on the southern edge of the town, on the Ballyshannon Road, overlooking Donegal Bay and Donegal Abbey. The new building was opened in 1980, with the school renamed as the Abbey Vocational School to reflect its new location.

The buildings used prior to the opening of the new school still remain in use, serving as the Donegal Town Library and Donegal Adult Education Centre.

== Identity ==
The school's crest is a decorative window from Donegal Friary surrounded by the initials of the Four Masters (Míchéal Ó Cléirigh, Cúcugríche Ó Cléirigh, Cúcugríche Ó Duigneán and Fearfeasa Ó Maolchonaire). The crest was introduced upon the opening of the new buildings in 1980, with a model of the window erected in front of the school, it was also at this time that a school uniform was introduced, and it currently consists of a maroon jumper and trousers/skirt and a grey shirt. The motto of the school is 'mol an óige' meaning 'praise the young' and is an extract from the Irish saying, 'mol an óige agus tiocfaidh sí' (English: praise the young and they will come with you). The motto also features as part of the crest, which also includes the proclamation 'Chum Gloiré Dé agus Onóra na hÉireann' (English: 'For the Glory of God and Honour of Ireland').
