= St John's College De La Salle =

- Coláiste Eoin De La Salle
- Le Fanu Road, Ballyfermot, Dublin; Ireland

Information
- Type: Secondary school
- Motto: Signum Fidei (Sign of the Faith)
- Religious affiliations: Institute of the Brothers of the Christian Schools; Roman Catholic Church
- Established: 1956; 70 years ago
- Closed: September 2023 (merged into St Seton's Secondary School)
- Principal: Ann Marie Leonard (Final Principal)
- Affiliations: De La Salle Christian Brothers; Department of Education; State Examinations Commission
- Website: www.stsetons.ie

St John's College (Irish: Coláiste Eoin De La Salle) was a Roman Catholic secondary school in Ballyfermot, Dublin, Ireland. Founded in 1956, it was run by the De La Salle Christian Brothers. In September 2023, the school closed as an independent institution to amalgamate with two other local schools to form St Seton's Secondary School.

== History ==
The college was founded in 1956 by the Institute of the Brothers of the Christian Schools and was managed by the Institute as a state-funded institution. The college was based on the principles of Jean-Baptiste de La Salle, a pioneer in modern education who founded the Institute of the Brothers of the Christian Schools.

Commonly known as the De La Salle Brothers in Britain, Ireland, Australasia and Asia, they are known in the United States and Canada as the Christian Brothers. They are sometimes confused with a similar congregation founded in Ireland by Edmund Ignatius Rice commonly known as the Irish Christian Brothers.

=== Amalgamation and closure ===
In September 2023, St John's College De La Salle amalgamated with Caritas College and St Dominic’s College to form a new co-educational school, St Seton's Secondary School. The merger, originally scheduled for 2022, was postponed by twelve months due to building programme delays at the Le Fanu Road site.

The school marked its closure with an official ceremony on Wednesday, 17 May 2023, which was attended by past and present staff, students, and members of the local community. While the three individual colleges closed, the new institution continues to operate from the modernized St John's campus, which was redeveloped to accommodate approximately 800 pupils.

== Cohort ==
Prior to its closure, the school offered four class levels. Each class had an average number of 15–23 students. St John's offered the Transition Year program and senior cycle students were divided into three programmes: the Leaving Certificate, Leaving Certificate Applied, and Leaving Certificate Vocational Programme.

== Notable alumni ==
- Joe Duffy, broadcaster.
- Willo Flood, professional footballer.
- Brian Shelley, professional footballer.
