= Maynooth Post Primary School =

Second-level school in County Kildare, Ireland

- Iar Bhunscoil Mhá Nuad

Location
- Mariavilla, Maynooth, County Kildare; W23 X6X8; Ireland
- Coordinates: 53°23′46″N 6°35′59″W

Information
- Religious affiliation: multidenominational
- Established: 1971
- Principal: Johnny Nevin
- Gender: mixed
- Enrollment: 1,253
- Campus size: 2.3 hectares (5.7 acres)
- Campus type: Urban
Colours
- Website: mpps.ie

Maynooth Post Primary School is a coeducational multidenominational secondary school in Maynooth, County Kildare, Ireland.

== Curriculum ==
Maynooth PPS offers Junior Certificate, Transition Year, Leaving Certificate Applied and Leaving Certificate courses. Students wear a navy blue jumper, blue shirt, navy and blue striped tie, navy trousers. Girls have the choice of wearing the school's kilt or navy trousers.

== History ==
Maynooth Post Primary opened in 1971 as a Vocational School in the grounds of the Presentation Convent and moved to its present location in 1972 under the auspices of Kildare Vocational Educational Committee (now Kildare and Wicklow Education and Training Board). The school buildings were extended in 1983 and again in 2007. Maynooth Post Primary moved to a new education campus in 2021, comprising a VEC and Maynooth Community College, on a greenfield site further up the Moyglare Road. The new buildings were originally intended to be opened by 2016. Complications in planning permission caused the development to be delayed: construction began in mid-2017.

== Musical program ==
As a part of the Transition Year Program, Maynooth Post Primary includes an optional musical production. The students take part as cast and crew and perform the production along with the help of teachers. The 2017 performance was Les Misérables.

== Notable alumni ==
- Paul Mescal, actor
