= Academic grading in the Republic of Ireland =

In Irish secondary schools, grades are awarded using letters along this scale:

Higher Level Grade	Percentage Range	Points at Higher Level	Extra Points for Higher Level Maths
H1	90% -100%	100	+25
H2	80% - 89%	88	+25
H3	70% - 79%	77	+25
H4	60% - 69%	66	+25
H5	50% - 59%	56	+25
H6	40% - 49%	46	+25
H7	30% - 39%	37	(no bonus)
H8	under 30%	0	(no bonus)

Ordinary Level Grade	Percentage Range	Points at Ordinary Level
O1	90% -100%	56
O2	80% - 89%	46
O3	70% - 79%	37
O4	60% - 69%	28
O5	50% - 59%	20
O6	40% - 49%	12
O7	30% - 39%	0
O8	under 30%	0

LCVP	Points
DISTINCTION	66
MERIT	46
PASS	28

Foundation Level Grade	Percentage Range	Points at Foundation Level
F1	90% -100%	20
F2	80% - 89%	12
F3	70% - 79%	0
F4	60% - 69%	0
F5	50% - 59%	0
F6	40% - 49%	0
F7	30% - 39%	0
F8	under 30%	0

Any score below 10% is classed as No grade (NG). At Higher Level, a C grade and above is considered an 'Honour' grade.

The new leaving certificate grading system involves grades such as H1, H2, O1, O2, etc.

Leaving Certificate results are measured by the number of 'points' awarded to the student. It is usually the number of points awarded to the student that forms the basis for the student's acceptance or otherwise into a course of higher education (e.g. a university degree course). A number of points between 0 and 100 are awarded to students for each Leaving Certificate exam sat. The students then combine the points from their six top scoring exams, to obtain a final total score between 0 and 625. The number of points awarded for a particular grade depend on whether the student sat the exam for the 'Higher Level' course or the 'Ordinary Level' course. Points are awarded for foundation level maths for admission only on some courses.

Anything below a H8 or O7 is considered a failing grade, and no points are awarded. 25 bonus points will continue to be awarded for Higher Level Mathematics for H6 grades and above. For example, if an applicant receives a H6 grade, an additional 25 points will be added to the 46 points already awarded for a H6 grade i.e. Higher Level Mathematics now carries a points score of 71 for this applicant.

Changes to the points system can be found at the Central Applications Office.

== See also ==
- Junior Certificate
- Leaving Certificate
- Central Applications Office
- Education in the Republic of Ireland
- Grading in education
