= Dyslexia support in the Republic of Ireland =

In the Republic of Ireland, people with dyslexia, especially school children, can benefit from a range of support techniques including additional one-to-one literacy support from specialist teachers, computer tools with text-to-speech, spelling correction and word prediction; coloured glasses, and many other methods. The techniques chosen for an individual vary according to their particular conditions. People in Northern Ireland are aided by the service available from Dyslexia support in the United Kingdom.

== Mainstream education ==
=== Classroom aids ===
Depending on the level of impairment, students may be offered support from a Special Needs Assistant.

=== Irish language exemption ===
Irish is a compulsory subject in general. Students with dyslexia can claim an exemption in order to focus on English language study.

=== Examinations ===
Students who require support for state exams (scribes or word processors) can apply under the Reasonable Accommodation in the Certificate Examinations (Race) scheme. Up to 9,000 students required this support in 2015.

=== Third level ===
Students with disabilities are given additional support and access routes to colleges and universities under the scheme Disability Access Route to Education (DARE) scheme. Dyslexia is recognised as specific learning difficulty (SLD) under the scheme. Some institutions reserve places for these students which might end up being offered to candidates with lower points than the standard CAO cut-off.
