= CSPE =

CSPE can refer to:

- Centre for the Study of Perceptual Experience at the University of Glasgow
- California Society of Professional Engineers
- Civic, Social and Political Education, a compulsory subject in all secondary schools in the Republic of Ireland that focuses mainly on citizenship along with human rights, stewardship and interdependence.
- Chlorosulfonated polyethylene
