= Civic, Social and Political Education =

School subject in Ireland

Civic, Social and Political Education (CSPE) was a Junior Certificate subject offered in Ireland from 1997 to 2019. CSPE was a mandatory, non-academic subject that was mainly focused on project work. CSPE was offered only at Common Level, unlike most other subjects, which are offered at both Higher and Ordinary Level.

== Further details ==
- CSPE is a common level subject unlike other subjects in the curriculum. The course encourages civic responsibility through the development of skills of active participation and through the undertaking of Action Projects and teaches about the basis of the Irish political system.
- There are seven key concepts in CSPE these include the promotion of Rights and Responsibilities, Human Dignity, Stewardship, Development, Democracy, Law and Interdependence

== Examination ==
A total of 40% of the marks in the exam were awarded for a written theory test, which included such things as producing a poster, letter or article on a CSPE topic (such as poverty, racism, discrimination, etc.) and interpreting opinion polls. The written exam also had a number of short questions.

The remaining 60% of the marks were given for a report on an Action Project performed by an entire class of students at a time. This has to be based on one of the core topics - e.g. workers rights, environmentalism, racism, human rights, etc.

As from 2019, CSPE is not a subject in the Junior Certificate exam, but is still taught in schools.

== Senior Cycle ==
The National Council for Curriculum and Assessment (NCCA) have worked on a subject which focuses on citizenship as part of the Leaving Certificate curriculum. Politics and Society is based on key sociological concepts. This subject aims to develop the learner's capacity to engage in reflective and active citizenship, informed by the insights and skills of social and political sciences.

Politics and Society was introduced as a new Leaving Certificate subject in September 2016 and was examined for certification for the first time in June 2018.

== Global ==
=== France ===
In France, the equivalent of CSPE is called ECJS (éducation civique, juridique et sociale).
