= Joe McHugh =

Irish former politician (born 1971)

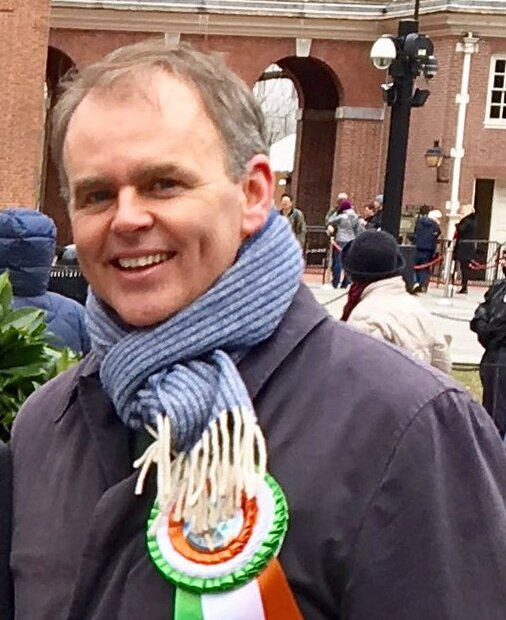
- McHugh in 2017

Chair of the Committee on European Union Affairs
- In office 15 September 2020 – 8 November 2024
- Preceded by: Michael Healy-Rae

Minister for Education and Skills
- In office 16 October 2018 – 27 June 2020
- Taoiseach: Leo Varadkar
- Preceded by: Richard Bruton
- Succeeded by: Norma Foley

Minister of State
- 2017–2018: Government Chief Whip
- 2017–2018: Culture, Heritage and the Gaeltacht
- 2016–2018: Taoiseach
- 2016–2017: Foreign Affairs and Trade
- 2014–2016: Arts, Heritage and the Gaeltacht
- 2014–2016: Communications, Energy and Natural Resources

Teachta Dála
- In office February 2016 – November 2024
- Constituency: Donegal
- In office May 2007 – February 2016
- Constituency: Donegal North-East

Senator
- In office 12 September 2002 – 24 May 2007
- Constituency: Administrative Panel

Donegal County Councillor
- In office June 1999 – June 2004
- Constituency: Milford

Personal details
- Born: 16 July 1971 (age 55) Carrigart, County Donegal, Ireland
- Party: Fine Gael (until 2022)
- Other political affiliations: Independent (2022–2024)
- Spouse: Olwyn Enright (m. 2005)
- Children: 3
- Relatives: Tom Enright (father-in-law)
- Education: Maynooth University

Joe McHugh (born 16 July 1971) is an Irish former Fine Gael politician from Carrigart, County Donegal. He served as a Teachta Dála (TD) for the Donegal North-East constituency from 2007 to 2016 and the Donegal constituency from 2016 to 2024. He served as a Minister of State from 2014 to 2018 and as Minister for Education and Skills from 2018 to 2020. He chaired the Committee on European Union Affairs from 2020 to 2024.

McHugh worked as a teacher and youth worker before winning election to Donegal County Council in the 1999 local elections. Elected to Seanad Éireann in 2002 as a senator for the Administrative Panel, he won a seat in Dáil Éireann at the 2007 general election. In 2014, he became Minister of State with responsibility for Gaeltacht Affairs and Natural Resources, and from 2017 to 2018, he was Government Chief Whip. Appointed Minister for Education and Skills in October 2018, he oversaw the closure of schools and the cancellation of the 2020 Junior Cycle and Leaving Certificate examinations due to the onset of the COVID-19 pandemic. He was not appointed to the Cabinet following the formation of a new government in June 2020, and he declined an appointment as Minister of State.

In May 2022, McHugh announced that he would not stand at the next general election, saying he wished to spend more time with his family. In July 2022, he resigned the Fine Gael party whip to vote for an opposition bill on the defective block crisis, after which he continued as an independent TD until the dissolution of the 33rd Dáil in November 2024.

== Early life ==
Born in Carrigart, County Donegal, McHugh was educated at Umlagh National School and Loreto Community School, Milford. He attended Maynooth University, where he received an honours degree in economics and sociology in 1992 and a higher diploma in education in 1993. He taught geography and mathematics at Loreto Secondary School, Letterkenny, from 1993 to 1995. From 1995 to 1996, he taught A-level economics in Dubai. In 1996, he returned to Ireland and became a youth worker in the Ballyboe area of Letterkenny.

== Political career ==
=== Donegal County Council ===
McHugh won a seat in the Milford local electoral area in the 1999 Donegal County Council election.

=== Seanad Éireann ===
Elected to Seanad Éireann as a Senator for the Administrative Panel in 2002, McHugh served as Fine Gael spokesperson on Community, Rural, Gaeltacht and Marine Affairs. When he was selected as the Dáil candidate for Donegal North-East, he moved into a new constituency office in Letterkenny, which was officially opened by Fine Gael party leader Enda Kenny on 6 October 2006.

=== Dáil Éireann ===
At the 2007 general election, McHugh topped the poll in Donegal North-East with 22.6% of the first preference vote. His wife Olwyn Enright also won re-election to the Dáil, making them the third married couple to sit in the same Dáil. In October 2007, McHugh was appointed party deputy spokesperson for Foreign Affairs and the Department of the Taoiseach, with special responsibility for North-South Co-operation.

In 2009, McHugh and Enright were criticised in the media for double-claiming overnight accommodation expenses while on official business in the Dáil, despite sharing accommodation as a married couple. Over the three years following their July 2005 marriage, McHugh was reported to have claimed €58,800 in overnight accommodation expenses, while Enright had separately claimed €61,600. Both TDs defended their expense claims as fully compliant with Oireachtas guidelines and procedures. Alleging that they were being subjected to a "disproportionate level of scrutiny of [their] personal circumstances" as the only married couple in the Dáil, McHugh stated that he had ceased claiming an overnight accommodation allowance in July 2008, due to the country's economic downturn. In 2010, McHugh and Enright were each reported to be claiming 50 percent of the overnight accommodation allowance available to a TD.

In January 2011, McHugh called for the government to mark the centenary of the founding of the Ulster Volunteer Force in 1912 by erecting a monument in Donegal. Eileen Doherty—a sister of Donegal County Councillor Eddie Fullerton, who was assassinated by loyalists in 1991—criticised McHugh, claiming that he and Fine Gael councillors in Donegal had opposed building a monument in Fullerton's memory. McHugh was re-elected to the Dáil at the 2011 general election, attaining 19.3% of the first-preference vote. Enright did not stand for re-election in 2011, having announced her decision to retire from politics while pregnant with the couple's second child. In Manchester in October 2011, McHugh became the first Fine Gael TD to address delegates from the British Conservative Party. He described it as an "opportunity."

On 15 July 2014, he was appointed as Minister of State at the Department of Communications, Energy and Natural Resources and at the Department of Arts, Heritage and the Gaeltacht with responsibility for Gaeltacht Affairs and Natural Resources. His appointment attracted criticism due to his basic knowledge of the Irish language, although he was subsequently praised for his efforts to improve his language skills to the point where he could conduct lengthy interviews in Irish. RTÉ Radio 1 produced a radio documentary, Fine Gaeilgeoir, narrated and produced by Máire Treasa Ní Cheallaigh, following his efforts to improve his Irish over the course of a year. In 2025, he published a book, Beidh Tú Alright: An Irish Language Journey, detailing the backlash he received upon his appointment and his efforts to master the Irish language as an adult.

In February 2016, McHugh was heavily criticised for allocating 93% of Gaeltacht grants to the Donegal Gaeltacht, which is located in and beside his constituency. This revelation led to calls for McHugh to appear before the Dáil Public Accounts Committee to explain such a disproportionate allocation of funding. McHugh subsequently denied the claims.

At the 2016 general election, McHugh was elected to the new five-seater Donegal constituency on the 11th count. The following May, he met Charles, Prince of Wales, and Camilla, Duchess of Cornwall, during their day visit to the county.

He was appointed as Minister for Education and Skills on 16 October 2018. As minister, he oversaw the closure of schools and the cancellation of the 2020 Junior Cycle and Leaving Certificate examinations due to the onset of the COVID-19 pandemic. Although he was re-elected in the 2020 general election, he was not re-appointed to the Government of the 33rd Dáil in June 2020 and declined the offer of appointment as a Minister of State. In September 2020, he became Chair of the Committee on European Union Affairs.

In May 2022, McHugh announced that he would not contest the next general election, saying he wished to spend more time with his family. On 6 July 2022, he resigned the Fine Gael party whip in order to vote for an opposition bill regarding the defective block crisis. Following McHugh's retirement from politics at the 2024 general election, Fine Gael ran two candidates in the Donegal constituency—Senator Nikki Bradley and John McNulty—but neither won election, marking the first time since the 1930s that Fine Gael did not win a seat in Donegal.

== Personal life ==
In July 2005, McHugh married Olwyn Enright, who served as a Fine Gael TD for Laois–Offaly from 2002 to 2011. They have three children.

== See also ==
- Families in the Oireachtas

Political offices
Preceded by Fergus O'Dowd	Minister of State for Natural Resources; 2014–2016	Succeeded by Seán Kyne
Preceded by Dinny McGinley	Minister of State for Gaeltacht Affairs; 2014–2016	Succeeded by Seán Kyne
Preceded by Jimmy Deenihan	Minister of State for the Diaspora and Overseas Development; 2016–2017	Succeeded by Ciarán Cannon
Preceded by Regina Doherty	Government Chief Whip; 2017–2018	Succeeded by Seán Kyne
Preceded by Seán Kyne	Minister of State for Gaeilge, the Gaeltacht and the Islands; 2017–2018	Succeeded by Seán Kyne
Preceded by Richard Bruton	Minister for Education and Skills; 2018–2020	Succeeded by Norma Foley

Dáil	Election	Deputy (Party)	Deputy (Party)	Deputy (Party)
17th	1961	Liam Cunningham (FF)	Neil Blaney (IFF)	Paddy Harte (FG)
18th	1965	Liam Cunningham (FF)	Neil Blaney (IFF)	Paddy Harte (FG)
19th	1969	Liam Cunningham (FF)	Neil Blaney (IFF)	Paddy Harte (FG)
20th	1973	Liam Cunningham (FF)	Neil Blaney (IFF)	Paddy Harte (FG)
20th	1976 by-election	Paddy Keaveney (IFF)	Neil Blaney (IFF)	Paddy Harte (FG)
21st	1977	Constituency abolished. See Donegal		
22nd	1981	Hugh Conaghan (FF)	Neil Blaney (IFF)	Paddy Harte (FG)
23rd	1982 (Feb)	Hugh Conaghan (FF)	Neil Blaney (IFF)	Paddy Harte (FG)
24th	1982 (Nov)	Hugh Conaghan (FF)	Neil Blaney (IFF)	Paddy Harte (FG)
25th	1987	Hugh Conaghan (FF)	Neil Blaney (IFF)	Paddy Harte (FG)
26th	1989	Jim McDaid (FF)	Neil Blaney (IFF)	Paddy Harte (FG)
27th	1992	Jim McDaid (FF)	Neil Blaney (IFF)	Paddy Harte (FG)
27th	1996 by-election	Jim McDaid (FF)	Cecilia Keaveney (FF)	Paddy Harte (FG)
28th	1997	Jim McDaid (FF)	Cecilia Keaveney (FF)	Harry Blaney (IFF)
29th	2002	Jim McDaid (FF)	Cecilia Keaveney (FF)	Niall Blaney (IFF)
30th	2007	Jim McDaid (FF)	Joe McHugh (FG)	Niall Blaney (FF)
31st	2011	Charlie McConalogue (FF)	Joe McHugh (FG)	Pádraig Mac Lochlainn (SF)
32nd	2016	Constituency abolished. See Donegal		

Dáil	Election	Deputy (Party)	Deputy (Party)	Deputy (Party)	Deputy (Party)	Deputy (Party)	Deputy (Party)	Deputy (Party)	Deputy (Party)
2nd	1921	Joseph O'Doherty (SF)	Samuel O'Flaherty (SF)	Patrick McGoldrick (SF)	Joseph McGinley (SF)	Joseph Sweeney (SF)	Peter Ward (SF)	6 seats 1921–1923	
3rd	1922	Joseph O'Doherty (AT-SF)	Samuel O'Flaherty (AT-SF)	Patrick McGoldrick (PT-SF)	Joseph McGinley (PT-SF)	Joseph Sweeney (PT-SF)	Peter Ward (PT-SF)	6 seats 1921–1923	
4th	1923	Joseph O'Doherty (Rep)	Peadar O'Donnell (Rep)	Patrick McGoldrick (CnaG)	Eugene Doherty (CnaG)	Patrick McFadden (CnaG)	Peter Ward (CnaG)	James Myles (Ind.)	John White (FP)
4th	1924 by-election	Joseph O'Doherty (Rep)	Peadar O'Donnell (Rep)	Patrick McGoldrick (CnaG)	Eugene Doherty (CnaG)	Patrick McFadden (CnaG)	Denis McCullough (CnaG)	James Myles (Ind.)	John White (FP)
5th	1927 (Jun)	Frank Carney (FF)	Neal Blaney (FF)	Daniel McMenamin (NL)	Eugene Doherty (CnaG)	Michael Óg McFadden (CnaG)	Hugh Law (CnaG)	James Myles (Ind.)	John White (FP)
6th	1927 (Sep)	Frank Carney (FF)	Neal Blaney (FF)	Archie Cassidy (Lab)	Eugene Doherty (CnaG)	Michael Óg McFadden (CnaG)	Hugh Law (CnaG)	James Myles (Ind.)	John White (FP)
7th	1932	Frank Carney (FF)	Neal Blaney (FF)	Brian Brady (FF)	Eugene Doherty (CnaG)	Daniel McMenamin (CnaG)	James Dillon (Ind.)	James Myles (Ind.)	John White (CnaG)
8th	1933	Joseph O'Doherty (FF)	Neal Blaney (FF)	Brian Brady (FF)	Hugh Doherty (FF)	Daniel McMenamin (CnaG)	James Dillon (NCP)	James Myles (Ind.)	Michael Óg McFadden (CnaG)
9th	1937	Constituency abolished. See Donegal East and Donegal West							

Dáil	Election	Deputy (Party)	Deputy (Party)	Deputy (Party)	Deputy (Party)	Deputy (Party)
21st	1977	Hugh Conaghan (FF)	Joseph Brennan (FF)	Neil Blaney (IFF)	James White (FG)	Paddy Harte (FG)
21st	1980 by-election	Hugh Conaghan (FF)	Clement Coughlan (FF)	Neil Blaney (IFF)	James White (FG)	Paddy Harte (FG)
22nd	1981	Constituency abolished. See Donegal North-East and Donegal South-West				

Dáil	Election	Deputy (Party)	Deputy (Party)	Deputy (Party)	Deputy (Party)	Deputy (Party)
32nd	2016	Pearse Doherty (SF)	Pat "the Cope" Gallagher (FF)	Thomas Pringle (Ind.)	Charlie McConalogue (FF)	Joe McHugh (FG)
33rd	2020	Pearse Doherty (SF)	Pádraig Mac Lochlainn (SF)	Thomas Pringle (Ind.)	Charlie McConalogue (FF)	Joe McHugh (FG)
34th	2024	Pearse Doherty (SF)	Pádraig Mac Lochlainn (SF)	Charles Ward (100%R)	Charlie McConalogue (FF)	Pat "the Cope" Gallagher (FF)
