= Leaving Certificate Vocational Programme =

Irish education programme

The Leaving Certificate Vocational Programme (LCVP) is a two-year optional Education Programme of the Irish Department of Education. LCVP was introduced in 1989. According to the Department of Education, the programme is designed to give a strong vocational dimension to the Leaving Certificate (established). The programme combines the virtues of academic study with a new and dynamic focus on self-directed learning, enterprise, work and the community.

The programme is aimed at young people who have completed the Junior Certificate and are entering the senior cycle of Secondary School education, but provides a stronger vocational focus than the more established Leaving Certificate. The LCVP aims to give students an opportunity to develop their interpersonal, vocational and technological skills as well as providing extra points for grades for getting into universities.

Students must pass four Leaving Certificate subjects, one of which must be Irish language [only for Irish students] and one Link Modules which is optional. Typically, students would take seven Leaving Certificate subjects along with the one link modules.

According to a 2014 report in the Irish Examiner, approximately 15,000 students took exams for the Leaving Certificate Vocational Programme in that year. In comparison, overall approximately 57,000 students took exams for the Irish Leaving Certificate in the same year.

In 2018, 26% of Leaving Cert students (over 30,000 people) sat the Leaving Certificate Vocational Programme.

== See also ==
- Leaving Certificate Applied
