= Education in the Republic of Ireland =

Education in Ireland
Department of Education and Youth Department of Further and Higher Education
- Minister for Education and Youth Minister for Further and Higher Education, Research, Innovation and Science: Hildegarde Naughton; James Lawless

National education budget (2025)
- Budget: €11.527 billion

General details
- Primary languages: Irish, English
- System type: National
- Compulsory education: 1922

Literacy (2003)
- Total: 99%
- Male: 99%
- Female: 99%

Enrollment
- Total: 1,199,024
- Primary: 567,716
- Secondary: 395,611
- Post secondary: 235,697

Attainment
- Secondary diploma: 89%
- Post-secondary diploma: 47%

Education in the Republic of Ireland is a primary, secondary and higher (often known as "third-level" or tertiary) education. In recent years, further education has grown immensely, and Ireland now has one of the highest percentages of higher education completion in the EU, at 55% of working age adults, and 63% of adults aged 25–34 (as of 2023). Growth in the economy since the 1960s has driven much of the change in the education system. For universities there are student service fees (up to a maximum of €2,500), which students are required to pay on registration, to cover examinations, insurance and registration costs, although grants are available for low-income students.

The Department of Education and Youth, under the control of the Minister for Education and Youth, is in overall control of policy, funding and direction, while other important organisations such as the National Qualifications Authority of Ireland, the Higher Education Authority, and on a local level the Education and Training Boards, are the only comprehensive system of government organisation. The Department of Further and Higher Education, Research, Innovation and Science, a department formed in August 2020, creates policy and controls funding for third-level institutions. Many other statutory and non-statutory bodies have a function in the education system. As of November 2025, the Minister for Education and Youth is Hildegarde Naughton and the Minister for Further and Higher Education, Research, Innovation and Science is James Lawless.

== History ==
On 10 September 1966, the Fianna Fáil Education Minister, Donogh O'Malley, made an unauthorised speech announcing plans for free upper second-level education in Ireland. Free upper second-level education was eventually introduced in September 1967, and is now widely seen as a milestone in Irish history.

In 1973, the Irish language requirement for a second-level certificate was abandoned.

== Structure ==
Students must go to schools from ages 5 to 16 or until they have completed three years of second-level of education. Under the Constitution of Ireland, parents are not obliged "in violation of their conscience and lawful preference to send their children to schools established by the State, or to any particular type of school designated by the State." However, the parental right to homeschool their child has met legal contests over minimum standards in the absence of constitutional provision for State-defined educational standards.

While English is the primary medium of instruction at all levels in most schools across the state, in Gaelscoileanna (Irish-language schools), Irish is the primary medium of instruction at all levels and English is taught as a second language. The Irish language remains a core subject taught in all public schools, with exemptions given to individual pupils on grounds of significant periods lived abroad, learning difficulties and other similar and/or valid reasons.

At third level, most university courses are conducted in English, with only a few Irish language options. Some universities offer courses partly through French, German or Spanish.

=== Framework ===
| EQF level | EHEA cycle | NFQ level | Major award types |
|---|---|---|---|
| 1 | | 1 | Level 1 Certificate |
| 1 | | 2 | Level 2 Certificate |
| 2 | | 3 | Level 3 Certificate; Junior Certificate |
| 3 | | 4 | Level 4 Certificate; Leaving Certificate |
| 4 | | 5 | Level 5 Certificate; Leaving Certificate |
| 5 | | 6 | Advanced Certificate |
| 5 | Short cycle within 1st | 6 | Higher Certificate |
| 6 | 1st | 7 | Ordinary Bachelor's degree |
| | 1st | 8 | Honours bachelor's degree Higher diploma |
| 7 | 2nd | 9 | Master's degree Postgraduate diploma |
| 8 | 3rd | 10 | Doctorate degree Higher doctorate |

=== Years ===
Education is compulsory for all children in Ireland from the ages of six to sixteen or until students have completed three years of second-level education and including one sitting of the Junior Certificate examination. Primary education commonly starts at four to five years old. Children typically enrol in a Junior Infants class at age four or five, depending on parental wishes. Some schools enrollment policies have age four as the minimum age requirement.

==== Pre-school ====
Most play schools in Ireland are in the private sector. Increasingly, children of working parents, who are below school age, attend a myriad of crèches, play-schools, Montessori schools, etc., which have sprung up in response to the changing needs of modern families. These operate as businesses and may charge often substantial childcare fees. Since 2009, in response to public demand for affordable childcare, children may receive two years of free enrollment in preschool in the years prior to starting primary schools under the Early Childcare and Education Scheme.

Irish language Naíonraí are growing rapidly across Ireland. Nearly 4,000 preschoolers attend 278 preschool groups.

==== Primary school ====
- Junior Infants (age 4–5/5–6)
- Senior Infants (age 5–6/6–7)
- First Class (age 6–7/7–8)
- Second Class (age 7–8/8–9)
- Third Class (age 8–9/9–10)
- Fourth Class (age 9–10/10–11)
- Fifth Class (age 10–11/11–12)
- Sixth Class (age 11–12/12–13)

Primary school children usually start between 8:30 a.m. and 9:20 a.m. Children finish between 1.10 p.m. and 2 p.m. in Junior & Senior infants, while older children spend another hour in school and finish between 2:10 p.m. and 3 p.m.

==== Secondary school ====
Since 1967, second-level education has been state funded in Ireland. However, schools may charge small fees for trips, mock exams, charity, etc.

===== Junior Cycle =====
The Junior Cycle is a three-year programme, culminating in the Junior Certificate examination. The Junior Certificate examination is sat in all subjects (usually 10 or 11) in early-June, directly after the end of Third Year.

- First Year (age 12–13/13–14)
- Second Year (age 13–14/14–15)
- Third Year (age 14–15/15–16)

===== Transition Year =====
- Transition Year sometimes called Fourth Year (age 15-16/16-17) – depending on school, this may be compulsory, optional or unavailable.

===== Senior Cycle =====
The Senior Cycle is a two-year programme to prepare students for the Leaving Certificate examinations. The Leaving Certificate examinations take place directly after the end of Sixth Year, with the first exam being held on the Wednesday following the June public holiday (the first Monday in June).

- Fifth Year (ages 16–18, or ages 15–17 if Transition Year is skipped)
- Sixth Year (ages 17–19, or ages 16–18 if Transition Year is skipped)

To prepare students for the State examination in both the Senior (Leaving Certificate) and Junior (Junior Certificate) cycles, many schools hold Mock Examinations (also known as Pre-Certificate Examinations) around February each year. These "mocks" are not state examinations: independent companies provide the exam papers and marking schemes – and are therefore not mandatory across all schools.

===== School Day =====
Secondary schools are obliged to have at least 28 hours of tuition time per week.

Most schools have 40-minute class periods, however an increasing number of schools have adopted 60-minute classes to make timetabling easier for teachers and students.

The school day generally starts between 08:20 and 09:00 and usually ends between 15:20 and 16:00. There is usually a 10 or 15 minute break between 10:00 and 11:00, and a 30 to 60 minute lunch period between 12:30 and 14:00. Students may have up to nine 40-minute classes per day, or six 60-minute classes, with some schools also having a 10-15 minute registration period during the day.

Most schools also have a half day on either Wednesdays or Fridays where the school day ends before lunchtime.

== Primary education ==
Religious ethos of Irish Primary Schools
1. Catholic 2,730 (88.2%)
2. Anglican 168 (5.43%)
3. Presbyterian 17 (0.55%)
4. Methodist 1 (0.03%)
5. Quaker 4 (0.13%)
6. Inter-Denominational 18 (0.58%)
7. Multi-Denominational 153 (4.94%)
8. Muslim 2 (0.06%)
9. Jewish 1 (0.03%)
10. Other 1 (0.03%)
Breakdown of Irish primary schools by gender
1. Boys 14 (0.45%)
2. Mixed 3,082 (99.2%)
3. Girls 10 (0.32%)

The Primary School Curriculum (1999) is taught in all schools. The document is prepared by the National Council for Curriculum and Assessment and leaves to the church authorities (usually the Catholic Church but not universally) the formulation and implementation of the religious curriculum in the schools they control. The curriculum seeks to celebrate the uniqueness of the child:

... as it is expressed in each child's personality, intelligence and potential for development. It is designed to nurture the child in all dimensions of his or her life—spiritual, moral, cognitive, emotional, imaginative, aesthetic, social and physical ...

The Primary Certificate Examination (1929–1967) was the terminal examination at this level until the first primary-school curriculum, Curaclam na Bunscoile (1971), was introduced, though informal standardised tests are still performed. The primary school system consists of eight years: Junior and Senior Infants, and First to Sixth Classes. Most children attend primary school between the ages of four and twelve although it is not compulsory until the age of six. A minority of children start school at three.

In 1990 the first Muslim National School (originally on the South Circular Road, now in Clonskeagh) gained recognition and state funding from the Department of Education, and in 2001 a second Muslim National school was established on the Dominican campus on the Navan road in north Dublin. Both are under the patronage of the Islamic Foundation of Ireland. 2014 saw the establishment of the first independent Muslim primary school in Blanchardstown.

Stratford National School is the only Jewish-ethos primary school in Ireland, under the patronage of the Dublin Talmud Torah. Due to the small size of the a Jewish community, only about 50% its pupils are of the Jewish faith.

As recently as 2016, virtually all state-funded primary schools – almost 97 percent – were under church control, with approximately 81% under Roman Catholic control. Irish law allowed schools under church (or other religious ethos) control to consider religion as the main factor in admissions. Oversubscribed schools often chose to admit Catholics over non-Catholics, a situation that created difficulty for non-Catholic families. The United Nations Committee on the Rights of the Child in Geneva asked James Reilly, the Minister for Children at that time, to explain the continuation of preferential access to state-funded schools on the basis of religion. He said that the laws probably needed to change, but noted it might take a referendum because the Irish constitution gives protections to religious institutions. The issue is most problematic in the Dublin area. A petition initiated by a Dublin attorney, Paddy Monahan, received almost 20,000 signatures in favour of overturning the preference given to Catholic children. An advocacy group, Education Equality, planned a legal challenge.

Ireland's main Muslim representative bodies, have praised the Irish education sector and catholic-run schools for being accommodating to the needs of pupils from their community.

Reforms in recent years, including an increase in the number of schools with multi- and non-denominational patrons, has meant that the number of Roman-Catholic-patronage state-funded schools has fallen to approximately 88.4%.

=== Types of school ===
Primary education is generally completed at a national school, a multidenominational school, a gaelscoil or a preparatory school.

- National schools date back to the introduction of state primary education in 1831. They are usually controlled by a board of management under diocesan patronage and often include a local clergyman. The term "national school" has of late become partly synonymous with primary school in some parts. Recently, there have been calls from many sides for fresh thinking in the areas of funding and governance for such schools, with some wanting them to be fully secularised.
- Gaelscoileanna are a recent movement, started in the mid 20th century. The Irish language is the working language in these schools and they can now be found countrywide in English-speaking communities. They differ from Irish-language national schools in Irish-speaking regions in that most are under the patronage of a voluntary organisation, Foras Pátrúnachta na Scoileanna Lán-Ghaeilge, rather than a diocesan patronage. Approximately 6% of primary school children attend Gaelscoileanna and approximately 3% attend Gaelcholáistí with 187 primary and post-primary schools across the country making it the fastest growing education sector.
- Multidenominational schools are another innovation. They are generally under the patronage of a non-profit limited company without share capital. They are often opened due to parental demand and students from all religions and backgrounds are welcome. Many are under the patronage of voluntary organisations such as Educate Together or An Foras Pátrúnachta. At least one proposed school has been approved under the patronage of the regional ETB, who generally run vocational secondary schools. In October 2020, general secretary of Education and Training Boards Ireland Paddy Lavelle confirmed that multidenominational state secondary schools, called State's Education and Training Boards (ETBs) – formerly called vocational schools – were going to phase out a set of Catholic influences such as mandatory graduation masses, displaying Catholic symbols only, and visits from diocesan inspectors, as described in the 'framework for the recognition of religious belief/identities of all students in ETB schools'.
- Preparatory schools are independent, fee-charging primary schools that are not reliant on the state for funding. These typically serve to prepare children for entry to fee-charging independent or voluntary secondary schools. Most are under the patronage of a religious order.

== Secondary education ==
Religious ethos of Irish secondary Schools
1. Catholic 344 (47.0%)
2. Anglican 23 (3.14%)
3. Presbyterian 1 (0.14%)
4. Methodist 1 (0.14%)
5. Quaker 1 (0.14%)
6. Inter-Denominational 151 (20.6%)
7. Multi-Denominational 210 (28.7%)
8. Jewish 1 (0.14%)
Breakdown of Irish secondary schools by gender
1. Boys 100 (13.7%)
2. Mixed 502 (69.0%)
3. Girls 126 (17.3%)

Most students enter secondary school aged 12–13. Most students attend and complete secondary education, with approximately 90% of school-leavers taking the terminal examination, the Leaving Certificate, at age 16–19 (in 6th Year at secondary school). Secondary education is generally completed at one of four types of school:

- Voluntary secondary schools, or just "secondary schools", are owned and managed by religious communities or private organisations. The state funds 90% of teachers' salaries. With respect to other running costs, the vast majority of schools have 95% covered by the state with the balance being made up largely through voluntary contributions from pupils' families, while a minority of schools charge fees for pupils to attend and do not receive state subvention other than teachers' salaries. These schools cater for 57% of secondary pupils.
- Community colleges, most of which were formerly called vocational schools, are owned and managed by Education and Training Boards, with 93% of their costs met by the state. These schools educate 28% of secondary pupils.
- Comprehensive schools or community schools were established in the 1960s, often by amalgamating voluntary secondary and vocational schools. They are fully funded by the state and run by local boards of management. Nearly 15% of secondary pupils attend such schools.
- Grind schools are fee-charging privately run schools outside the state sector, who tend to run only the Senior Cycle curriculum for 5th and 6th Year students as well as a one-year repeat Leaving Certificate programme.
- Gaelcholáistí are second-level schools (voluntary, vocational or comprehensive) located within English-speaking communities but in which the Irish language is used as the main medium of education. Approximately 3% of secondary students attend these schools.

In urban areas, there is considerable freedom in choosing the type of school the child will attend. The emphasis of the education system at second level is as much on breadth as on depth; the system attempts to prepare the individual for society and further education or work. This is similar to the Education system in Scotland. In 2022, the Programme for International Student Assessment (Pisa) found Ireland to be 2nd in reading and 11th in mathematics in a world survey at the age of 15.

=== Types of programme ===
The document Rules and Programme for Secondary Schools published by the Department of Education sets out the minimum standards of education required at this level. Examinations are overseen by the State Examinations Commission. Additional documents set out the standard in each element, module or subject.

==== Junior Cycle ====
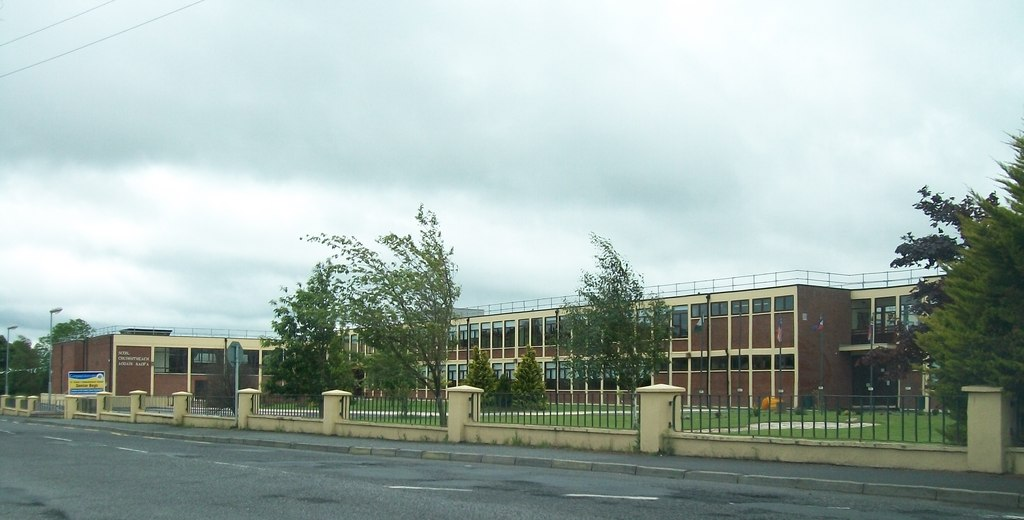
St Aidian's Comprehensive School, Station Road, Cootehill

The Junior Cycle builds on the education received at primary level and culminates with the Junior Certificate Examination. Students usually begin this at the age of 12 or 13. The Junior Certificate Examination is taken after three years of study and not before fourteen years of age. It consists of exams in:

- English
- Irish (Exemption can be granted)
- Maths

As well as a number of chosen subjects:

- Art
- German
- French
- Spanish
- Italian
- Latin
- Ancient Greek
- Classical Studies
- Music
- Business Studies
- Technology
- Home Economics
- Materials Technology (Woodwork, Metalwork)
- Engineering
- Technical Graphics
- Civic Social and Political Education (CSPE)
- Religious Education
- History
- Geography

The selection of optional and compulsory subjects varies from school to school. Most students take around ten examined subjects altogether. Other non-examined classes at Junior Cycle level include Physical Education and Social Personal and Health Education (SPHE).

==== Transition Year ====
Transition Year is a one-year informal course taken by an increasing number of students usually ages 15 or 16. The content of this is left to the school to model on the local needs. It is compulsory in some schools, optional in some and others do not offer it at all.

Students may attend structured classes, but do not cover material relevant to the Senior Cycle or the Leaving Certificate exams, and therefore students who choose not to do this year are in no way academically disadvantaged when entering the Senior Cycle. The range of activities in Transition Year or Fourth Year differs greatly from school to school, but many include activities such as work experience placements, project work, international trips or exchanges and excursions. Students may participate in courses such as creative writing, sailing, film-making, public speaking and so on, or enter competitions in science, fashion, motor sport and others that would normally be too time-consuming for a full-time student.

Proponents of TY believe that it allows students an extra year to mature, engage in self-directed learning, explore career options and to choose subjects for senior cycle (the results of the Junior Certificate examination do not become available until midway through September, by which time students not taking Transition Year will already have chosen their classes and begun attending). Opponents believe that a year away from traditional study and the classroom environment can distract students and cause problems when they return to the Senior Cycle. They also believe that the activities undertaken in TY prevent some students from enrolling in this year, as they can be costly and most schools charge a fee of a few hundred euro to cover these activities.

==== Senior Cycle ====
The Senior Cycle builds on the junior cycle and culminates with the Leaving Certificate Examination. Students normally begin this aged 15–17 the year following the completion of the Junior Cycle or Transition Year. The Leaving Certificate Examination, with required exams in English, Irish, and Maths (barring exemptions), and 3 or 4 optional subjects, is taken after two years of study, usually at the ages of 17–19.

==== Typical School Model ====
The typical secondary school consists of First to Third Year (with the Junior Certificate at the end of Third), Transition Year (if offered and taken by the student), and Fifth and Sixth Year (with the Leaving Certificate at the end of Sixth Year).

The vast majority of students complete secondary education, with only 4% of students failing to complete the Leaving Certificate, the second lowest percentage in the EU, where the average is 10%.

Ireland's secondary students rank above average in terms of academic performance in both the OECD and EU; having reading literacy, mathematical literacy and scientific literacy test scores better than average. Ireland has the highest percentage in the OECD of students at who are highly proficient at reading, at 32%.

=== Issues ===
A shortage of teachers is one of the most pressing challenges in Ireland, particularly at post-primary level, where enrolments are rising by about 15,000 students annually. Schools in the Greater Dublin Area struggle to fill positions in subjects like math, leading to unqualified teachers or class cancellations. Primary schools face substitute shortages.

== Third-level education ==
According to the 2022 US News rankings, Ireland is among the top twenty best countries for education.

== Special needs education ==
The Education for Persons with Special Educational Needs Act 2004 established the framework for the education of students with special needs. The National Council for Special Education (NCSE) supports students with physical and intellectual disabilities. Some schools provide specific services to students with disabilities. Students with dyslexia are offered additional supports where funding is available.

A special needs assistant (SNA) is a teaching assistant who has specialised in working with young people in the classroom setting who require additional learning support due to disability.

== Areas of disadvantage ==
The Department of Education identifies disadvantaged schools and has schemes in place to provide additional assistance to low-income families and families experiencing financial hardship. Available assistance includes an allowance for school clothing and footwear, assistance with purchasing school books (administered by school principals), exemption from examination fees for the Leaving Certificate and Junior Certificate exams, and a 'remote areas boarding grant' that facilitates students living in remote areas to attend secondary school.

As of 2023, the European Investment Bank is lending €200 million to finance investment in school buildings around Ireland. The project is part of the Department of Education's newest round of school capital investment, which seeks to improve the learning environment for about 23,000 pupils as well as teacher working conditions.

Delivering Equality of Opportunity in Schools (DEIS, often in the anacronym form Deis) is the main policy initiative of the Department of Education to address educational disadvantage. Schools that operate under the Deis scheme are known as Deis schools. The increased resources under the program include reduced class sizes. The program has been in place since 2005. As of 2020, there were 890 Deis schools with more than 180,000 students. In March 2022, Norma Foley, the minister for education, announced an expansion of the program to include an additional 310 schools (273 primary and 37 post-primary).

== International students ==
=== Scale and demographics ===
While comprehensive national statistics on international secondary students are not centrally compiled by the Department of Education, the sector has expanded significantly as part of Ireland's broader international education strategy. According to 2016 Census data, approximately 96,497 non-Irish national students of all education levels were resident in Ireland, accounting for 18 percent of all non-Irish nationals in the country. A significant proportion of secondary-level placements originate from mainland Europe, driven by demand for English-language education and participation in the Transition Year programme.

=== Educational pathways and institutional types ===
International students pursue secondary education in Ireland through three main institutional pathways:

Day schools with host family accommodation: International students attending fee-paying private secondary schools typically live with Irish host families vetted and supported by education agencies or schools. Private secondary schools accept both European Economic Area (EEA) and non-EEA student applications. Only students from EEA countries may attend public (free) schools; non-EEA students must enroll in fee-paying schools.

Boarding schools: Several prestigious boarding schools actively recruit international students. Notable institutions include Villiers School (Limerick), which serves students aged 12–18 from over 52 countries and is the only Irish boarding school authorized to offer the International Baccalaureate Diploma, and Blackrock College (Dublin), both of which offer residential accommodation for foreign students. Tuition at boarding schools typically ranges from €16,000 to €32,000 per year, generally lower than comparable institutions in the United States or Canada.

International education agencies: Specialized organizations facilitate student placements and provide ongoing support. Educatius operates as a major placement agency, matching students with host families throughout Ireland. EIL Intercultural Learning places students with host families in 14 designated host communities, assigning local coordinators to mentor students and families.

=== Transition Year programme ===
The Transition Year (TY) is an optional, exam-free one-year programme offered after the Junior Cycle (typically at age 15–16) that has become particularly attractive to international students. Unlike higher-stakes examination years, Transition Year emphasizes personal development, project-based learning, workplace experience, and cultural integration without the pressure of formal examinations. For international students, the programme offers several advantages: it provides an intensive English language immersion period within a mainstream school setting, facilitates social integration through group projects and shared activities, and allows students to experience Irish education and culture without examination anxiety. Each school designs its own Transition Year curriculum within national guidelines, permitting flexibility to accommodate international learners.

=== Regulatory framework and safeguarding ===
Ireland maintains robust regulatory requirements to protect international minors studying in the country.

Guardianship: International students under 18 years old studying without parents present must have a designated in loco parentis guardian resident in Ireland during their stay. This guardian may be a family member, family friend, or professional guardianship agency. Schools typically require guardians to attend parent-teacher meetings and be available during school holidays. Professional guardianship services typically charge €1,500 to €3,000 per academic year depending on the scope of services provided.

Host family standards: Host families undergo mandatory Garda vetting (police background clearance) under the National Vetting Bureau Acts 2012–2016. All household members aged 18 and over must be Garda vetted before a student can reside in the home. Families are visited and assessed by education agency coordinators to ensure homes meet child welfare standards. Host families typically earn between €150 and €250 per week per student to offset accommodation and meal costs.

TUSLA involvement: For separated or unaccompanied international minors, Ireland's Child and Family Agency (TUSLA) conducts assessments to determine appropriate care arrangements. Upon referral, unaccompanied children are assigned a social worker, and placement decisions are made based on the child's safety and welfare.

Visa and residency requirements: Non-EEA students require a student visa (Stamp 2) to attend secondary school. The student's school must be a recognized fee-paying institution appearing on the Department of Education website. Applicants must provide evidence of course fees paid in full, proof of sufficient funds (minimum €10,000 per academic year in addition to fees), a valid passport, and notarized parental consent forms detailing the student's guardian arrangements in Ireland.

=== Academic recognition ===
The Leaving Certificate, Ireland's secondary school leaving qualification, is recognized as a university entrance qualification across Europe and internationally. The revised grading scale aligns the Leaving Certificate more closely with other European secondary qualifications including the Scottish Highers, English A-levels, and the International Baccalaureate, facilitating recognition by universities across the European Union and other jurisdictions. Irish students increasingly pursue higher education in continental European universities, including institutions in Germany, the Netherlands, France, Spain, and Italy, where the Leaving Certificate is accepted for entry. However, formal diploma recognition procedures vary by country and institution, as the European Union does not operate an automatic mutual recognition system for secondary school qualifications.

=== Growth and future outlook ===
The international secondary education sector in Ireland has expanded as part of the government's broader internationalization strategy for education. Ireland's competitive advantages for international secondary students include lower tuition costs relative to North American peers, proximity to other English-speaking nations, access to diverse cultural experiences, and institutional flexibility in accommodating non-native English speakers. The Transition Year programme's popularity has been a particular driver of growth, particularly among students from continental Europe seeking to improve English language proficiency in a culturally immersive context. Education agencies have expanded their operations and recruitment efforts in key source markets to support continued expansion of this sector.

Ireland's education expenditure per student (USD 13,059 from primary to tertiary) is below the OECD average (USD 14,209), with particular strain at third level. Higher education faces a €307 million core funding gap, with phased increases starting at €50 million in 2025, rising to €150 million by 2029. This has led to outdated equipment, depleted research infrastructure, and inability to compete internationally—e.g., universities lag behind rivals in the United Kingdom due to underinvestment.

== Holidays ==
At primary level, schools are required to open for a minimum of 182 days and 167 at post-primary level. Standard Easter, Christmas and mid-term breaks are published by the Department of Education for the upcoming years. Exact dates vary depending on the school. Generally, Primary and Secondary schools get similar holidays. The year is broken up into three terms:

- From the week in which the 1st of September falls to the week before Christmas.
- From the week after New Year's Day to the week before Easter Sunday.
- From the week after Easter Sunday to the end of June for primary level or end of May/start of June for post-primary level to facilitate state exams starting in June.

There is a mid-term break (one week off halfway through a term) around the public holiday at the end of October, two weeks off for Christmas: generally the last week in December and the first week in January, another mid-term break in February, two weeks off for Easter and 8 (primary) or 12 (secondary) weeks of summer holidays. Public Holidays are also taken off.

In 2020, due to the COVID-19 pandemic in Ireland, all schools, colleges, universities and childcare facilities closed in March 2020 and remained closed until the end of August/September 2020.

== See also ==
- Academic year in Ireland
- List of schools in the Republic of Ireland
- List of universities in the Republic of Ireland
  - National Institute for Higher Education
  - Institutes of Technology in Ireland
- Young Scientist and Technology Exhibition
- List of fee-charging schools in Ireland
- Education controversies in the Republic of Ireland
- 2010 student protest in Dublin
- List of Ireland-related topics
