= Norma Foley =

Irish politician (born 1970)

Norma Foley TD
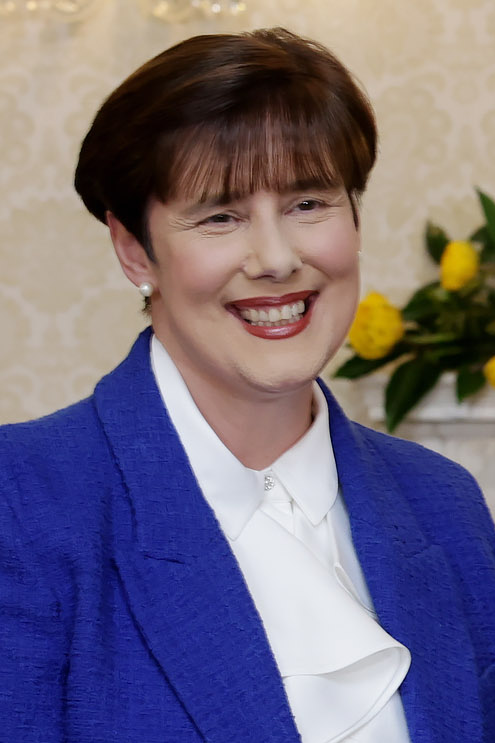
- Foley in 2024

Minister for Children, Disability and Equality
- Incumbent
- Assumed office 23 January 2025
- Taoiseach: Micheál Martin
- Preceded by: Roderic O'Gorman

Minister for Education
- In office 27 June 2020 – 23 January 2025
- Taoiseach: Micheál Martin; Leo Varadkar; Simon Harris
- Preceded by: Joe McHugh
- Succeeded by: Helen McEntee

Teachta Dála
- Incumbent
- Assumed office February 2020
- Constituency: Kerry

Personal details
- Born: 1970 (age 55–56) Tralee, County Kerry, Ireland
- Party: Fianna Fáil
- Spouse: Denis Maguire (m. 2005)
- Parent: Denis Foley (father)
- Education: University College Cork

Norma Foley (born 1970) is an Irish Fianna Fáil politician who has served as Minister for Children, Disability and Equality since January 2025. She previously served as Minister for Education from 2020 to 2025. She has been a Teachta Dála (TD) for Kerry since 2020.

== Local politics ==
Foley was previously a member of Kerry County Council for the Tralee local electoral area, serving from 1994 until her election to the Dáil in 2020. She also served as a member of Tralee Urban District Council until its abolition in 2014.

== Dáil Éireann ==
After failing in her bid to secure a nomination as a general election candidate in Kerry North in 2002, Foley was added to the Fianna Fáil ticket as Tom McEllistrim's running mate in the same constituency in 2007. She polled 4,937 first preference votes and finished fifth overall in the three-seat constituency after being eliminated on the third count.

Foley again failed in her bid to secure a nomination as a general election candidate in 2016, but was a late addition to the ticket as a third Fianna Fáil candidate in the Kerry constituency in advance of the 2020 general election. She polled 6,856 first preference votes and secured the fifth and final seat at the expense of her party colleague John Brassil on the eighth count. Johnnie Wall was co-opted to Foley's seat on Kerry County Council following her election to the Dáil. On her first day in the Dáil, Foley proposed her party leader Micheál Martin in his successful bid to become Taoiseach.

At the 2024 general election, Foley was re-elected to the Dáil.

=== Minister for Education ===
Foley was appointed Minister for Education in June 2020 following the formation of a coalition government, during the COVID-19 pandemic in Ireland. Her tenure to date has resulted in several gaffes, most prominently involving the COVID-19 impact on education and state examinations. In September 2020, Foley announced that two coding errors were identified in the Leaving Certificate calculated grades system. She apologised and announced that around 7,200 students were affected, receiving a higher grade than they should have while some students received a lower grade. It was later confirmed that a third error was identified.

In January 2021, Foley and the government were forced to abandon plans for Leaving Certificate students to attend school for three days a week, and instead students would return to homeschooling until February, after the ASTI directed its members not to return to in-school teaching. Also in January, Foley was forced to abandon plans to reopen special schools for thousands of children with special educational needs following safety concerns among staff unions. In February, Foley announced a new phase of planning for the Leaving Certificate exams, but the ASTI withdrew from discussions with the Department of Education after it said that the plan being developed would not provide a "meaningful Leaving Certificate" for students. In March, she lost her appeals against findings that two home-schooled students were unfairly excluded from the Leaving Certificate calculated grades process.

On 17 December 2022, she was re-appointed to the same position following Leo Varadkar's appointment as Taoiseach.

=== Minister for Children, Disability and Equality ===
On 23 January 2025, Foley was appointed as Minister for Children, Disability and Equality in the government led by Micheál Martin, following the 2024 general election.

== Personal life ==
Before becoming a TD, she was a teacher at Presentation Secondary School, Tralee. She is married to fellow teacher Denis Maguire. Her father Denis Foley was a Fianna Fáil TD for Kerry North from 1981 to 1989 and 1992 to 2002.

Political offices
Preceded by Joe McHugh	Minister for Education; 2020–2025	Succeeded by Helen McEntee
Preceded by Roderic O'Gorman as Minister for Children, Equality, Disability, Integration and Youth	Minister for Children, Disability and Equality; 2025–present	Incumbent

Dáil	Election	Deputy (Party)	Deputy (Party)	Deputy (Party)	Deputy (Party)	Deputy (Party)	Deputy (Party)	Deputy (Party)
4th	1923	Tom McEllistrim (Rep)	Austin Stack (Rep)	Patrick Cahill (Rep)	Thomas O'Donoghue (Rep)	James Crowley (CnaG)	Fionán Lynch (CnaG)	John O'Sullivan (CnaG)
5th	1927 (Jun)	Tom McEllistrim (FF)	Austin Stack (SF)	William O'Leary (FF)	Thomas O'Reilly (FF)	James Crowley (CnaG)	Fionán Lynch (CnaG)	John O'Sullivan (CnaG)
6th	1927 (Sep)	Tom McEllistrim (FF)	Frederick Crowley (FF)	William O'Leary (FF)	Thomas O'Reilly (FF)	James Crowley (CnaG)	Fionán Lynch (CnaG)	John O'Sullivan (CnaG)
7th	1932	Tom McEllistrim (FF)	Frederick Crowley (FF)	John Flynn (FF)	Thomas O'Reilly (FF)	Eamon Kissane (FF)	Fionán Lynch (CnaG)	John O'Sullivan (CnaG)
8th	1933	Tom McEllistrim (FF)	Frederick Crowley (FF)	John Flynn (FF)	Denis Daly (FF)	Eamon Kissane (FF)	Fionán Lynch (CnaG)	John O'Sullivan (CnaG)
9th	1937	Constituency abolished. See Kerry North and Kerry South						

Dáil	Election	Deputy (Party)	Deputy (Party)	Deputy (Party)	Deputy (Party)	Deputy (Party)
32nd	2016	Martin Ferris (SF)	Michael Healy-Rae (Ind.)	Danny Healy-Rae (Ind.)	John Brassil (FF)	Brendan Griffin (FG)
33rd	2020	Pa Daly (SF)	Michael Healy-Rae (Ind.)	Danny Healy-Rae (Ind.)	Norma Foley (FF)	Brendan Griffin (FG)
34th	2024	Pa Daly (SF)	Michael Healy-Rae (Ind.)	Danny Healy-Rae (Ind.)	Norma Foley (FF)	Michael Cahill (FF)
