= Multidenominational school =

Primary school in Ireland

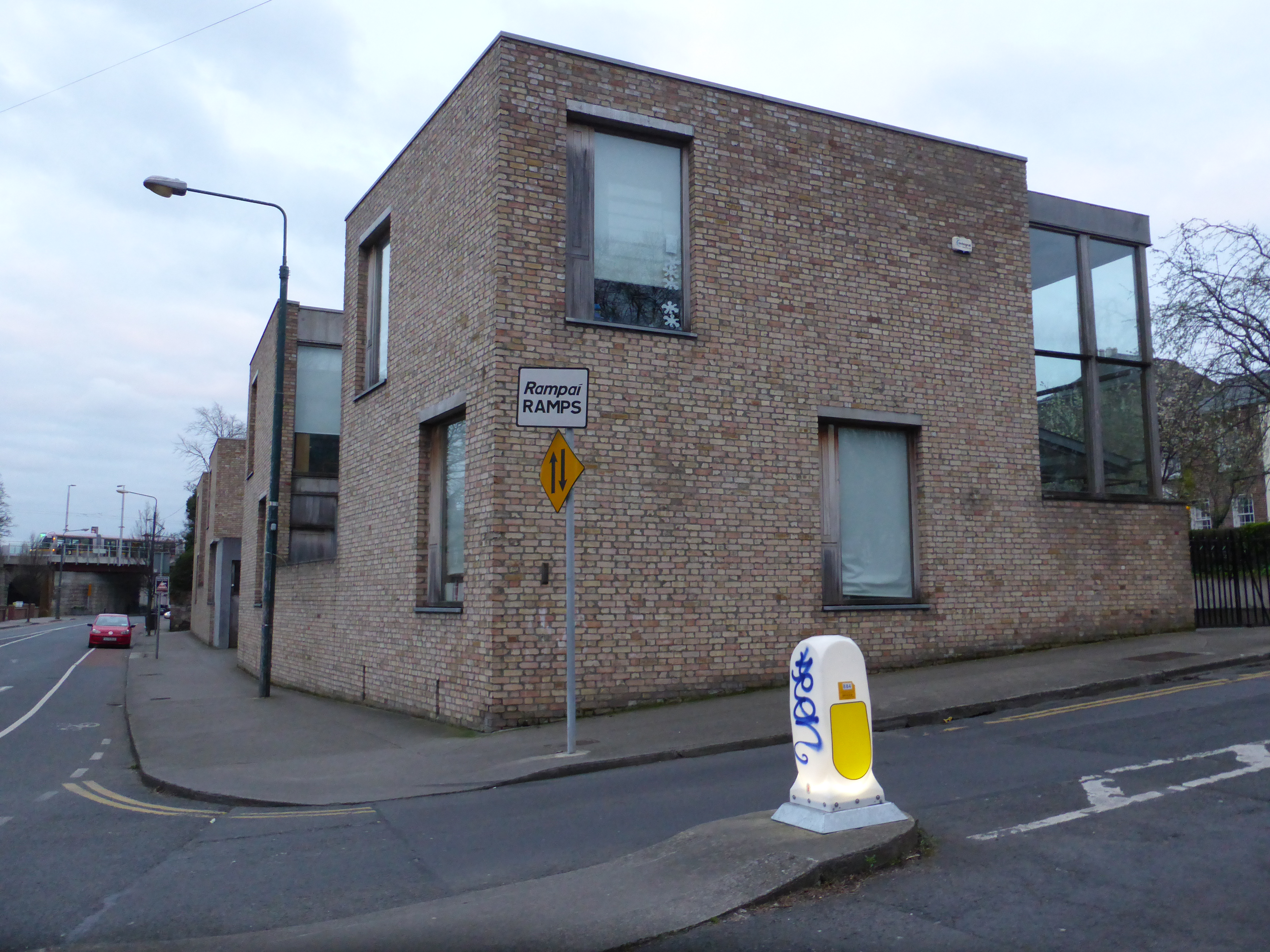
Multidenominational school in Ranelagh, Dublin.

A multidenominational school (Irish: scoil ilchreidmheach) is a modern type of primary school in Ireland that moves away from the Catholic school model, which are common in Ireland (these also include Church of Ireland schools).

== See also ==
- Education in the Republic of Ireland
- Education in Northern Ireland
- Educate Together
