= Minister for Education and Youth =

Irish government cabinet minister

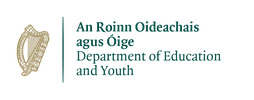

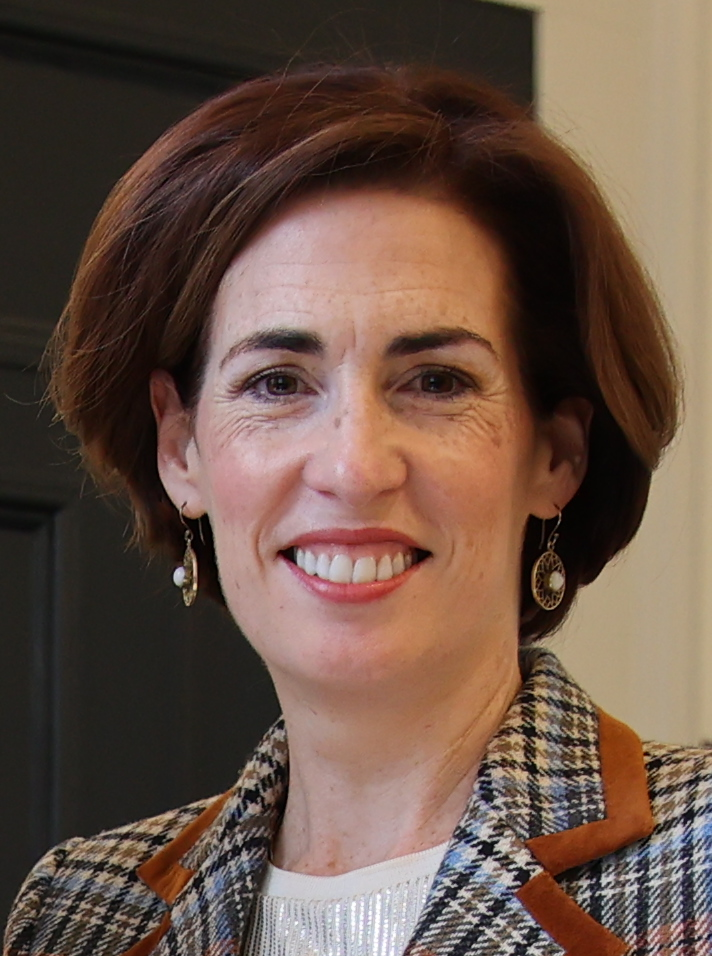
- Incumbent; Hildegarde Naughton since 18 November 2025
- Department of Education and Youth
- Status: Cabinet Minister
- Member of: Government of Ireland; Council of the European Union; North/South Ministerial Council; Dáil Éireann
- Reports to: Taoiseach
- Seat: Dublin, Ireland
- Nominator: Taoiseach
- Appointer: President of Ireland; (on the binding advice of the Taoiseach)
- Inaugural holder: John J. O'Kelly as Minister for Irish
- Formation: 29 June 1920
- Salary: €210,750 (2025) (including €115,953 TD salary)
- Website: Official website

The minister for education and youth (Irish: An tAire Oideachais agus Óige) is a senior minister in the Government of Ireland and leads the Department of Education and Youth. The current minister for education and youth is Hildegarde Naughton, TD.

She is assisted by one minister of state:

- Michael Moynihan, TD – Minister of State for special education and inclusion

== Functions ==
The minister engages in a wide range of activities relating to education in Ireland, including policy planning, quality assurance and the provision of a broad range of services.

The department officially aims to:

- Promote equity and inclusion
- Promote lifelong learning
- Plan for education that is relevant to personal, social, cultural and economic needs.

In recent years some of these functions have been devolved to statutory authorities, in particular the Higher Education Authority, the National Qualifications Authority and the State Examinations Commission. Irish universities and colleges are to a large extent free of government control, with this being largely limited to policy formation and statistics preparation.

== History ==
In 1919, the Gaelic League passed a motion calling for the Dáil to appoint a minister for Irish to promote the use of the Irish language throughout the country, which was read into the record of the Dáil by the Ceann Comhairle. On 29 June 1920, John J. O'Kelly, known in Irish as Seán Ua Ceallaigh, and also by the pen name Sceilg, was appointed as Minister for Irish.

After the Second Dáil met in August 1921, the President Éamon de Valera proposed that this position be altered to that of Minister for Education, saying "It was obvious the Minister in charge should be capable of dealing with the part referring to Irish but he thought the Department should have a wider meaning than at present". This was accepted by the Dáil. The following day, when de Valera proposed his new ministry, O'Kelly was proposed as Minister for Education, continuing in his previous position with an expanded function.

It was given a statutory basis in the Irish Free State as one of the positions in the Executive Council under the Ministers and Secretaries Act 1924.

== List of office-holders ==
Denotes acting Minister

=== Minister for Irish 1920–1921 ===
Name	Term of office		Party	Government(s) (Note: Before 1937: DM – Dáil Ministry; PG – Provisional Government; EC – Executive Council.)
John J. O'Kelly	29 June 1920	26 August 1921	Sinn Féin	2nd DM
=== Minister for Education 1921–1997 ===
Name	Term of office		Party	Government(s)
John J. O'Kelly (Note: John J. O'Kelly held the title of Secretary for Education.)	26 August 1921	9 January 1922	Sinn Féin	3rd DM
Michael Hayes	11 January 1922	9 September 1922	Sinn Féin (Pro-Treaty)	4th DM
Fionán Lynch	1 April 1922	30 August 1922	Sinn Féin (Pro-Treaty)	1st PG
Eoin MacNeill	30 August 1922	24 November 1925	Cumann na nGaedheal	2nd PG • 5th DM • 1st EC • 2nd EC
John M. O'Sullivan	28 January 1926	9 March 1932	Cumann na nGaedheal	3rd EC • 4th EC • 5th EC
Thomas Derrig (1st time)	9 March 1932	8 September 1939	Fianna Fáil	6th EC • 7th EC • 8th EC • 1st • 2nd
Seán T. O'Kelly	8 September 1939	27 September 1939	Fianna Fáil	2nd
Éamon de Valera (acting)	27 September 1939	18 June 1940	Fianna Fáil	2nd
Thomas Derrig (2nd time)	18 June 1940	18 February 1948	Fianna Fáil	2nd • 3rd • 4th
Richard Mulcahy (1st time)	18 February 1948	13 June 1951	Fine Gael	5th
Seán Moylan	13 June 1951	2 June 1954	Fianna Fáil	6th
Richard Mulcahy (2nd time)	2 June 1954	20 March 1957	Fine Gael	7th
Jack Lynch (1st time)	20 March 1957	23 June 1959	Fianna Fáil	8th
Patrick Hillery	23 June 1959	21 April 1965	Fianna Fáil	9th • 10th
George Colley	21 April 1965	13 July 1966	Fianna Fáil	11th
Donogh O'Malley	13 July 1966	10 March 1968	Fianna Fáil	11th • 12th
Jack Lynch (acting)	10 March 1968	26 March 1968	Fianna Fáil	12th
Brian Lenihan	26 March 1968	2 July 1969	Fianna Fáil	12th
Pádraig Faulkner	2 July 1969	14 March 1973	Fianna Fáil	13th
Richard Burke	14 March 1973	2 December 1976	Fine Gael	14th
Peter Barry	2 December 1976	5 July 1977	Fine Gael	14th
John Wilson	5 July 1977	30 June 1981	Fianna Fáil	15th • 16th
John Boland	30 June 1981	9 March 1982	Fine Gael	17th
Martin O'Donoghue	9 March 1982	6 October 1982	Fianna Fáil	18th
Charles Haughey (acting)	7 October 1982	27 October 1982	Fianna Fáil	18th
Gerard Brady	27 October 1982	14 December 1982	Fianna Fáil	18th
Gemma Hussey	14 December 1982	14 February 1986	Fine Gael	19th
Patrick Cooney	14 February 1986	10 March 1987	Fine Gael	19th
Mary O'Rourke	10 March 1987	14 November 1991	Fianna Fáil	20th • 21st
Noel Davern	14 November 1991	11 February 1992	Fianna Fáil	21st
Séamus Brennan	11 February 1992	12 January 1993	Fianna Fáil	22nd
Niamh Bhreathnach (1st time)	12 January 1993	17 November 1994	Labour	23rd
Michael Smith	18 November 1994	15 December 1994	Fianna Fáil	23rd
Niamh Bhreathnach (2nd time)	15 December 1994	26 June 1997	Labour	24th
=== Minister for Education and Science 1997–2010 ===
Name	Term of office		Party	Government(s)
Micheál Martin	26 June 1997	27 January 2000	Fianna Fáil	25th
Michael Woods	27 January 2000	6 June 2002	Fianna Fáil	25th
Noel Dempsey	6 June 2002	29 September 2004	Fianna Fáil	26th
Mary Hanafin	29 September 2004	7 May 2008	Fianna Fáil	26th • 27th
Batt O'Keeffe	7 May 2008	23 March 2010	Fianna Fáil	27th • 28th
=== Minister for Education and Skills 2010–2020 ===
Name	Term of office		Party	Government(s)
Mary Coughlan	23 March 2010	9 March 2011	Fianna Fáil	28th
Ruairi Quinn	9 March 2011	11 July 2014	Labour	29th
Jan O'Sullivan	11 July 2014	6 May 2016	Labour	29th
Richard Bruton	6 May 2016	16 October 2018	Fine Gael	30th • 31st
Joe McHugh	16 October 2018	27 June 2020	Fine Gael	31st
=== Minister for Education 2020–2025 ===
Name	Term of office		Party	Government(s)
Norma Foley	27 June 2020	23 January 2025	Fianna Fáil	32nd • 33rd • 34th
=== Minister for Education and Youth 2025–present ===
Name	Term of office		Party	Government(s)
Helen McEntee	23 January 2025	18 November 2025	Fine Gael	35th
Hildegarde Naughton	18 November 2025	Incumbent	Fine Gael	35th
