= Leaving Certificate Applied =

Irish educational qualification

The Leaving Certificate Applied (Irish: Ardteistiméireacht Fheidhmeach) is a self-contained two-year programme of the Irish Department of Education. It was first introduced in 1995 as an alternative or variant of the established Leaving Certificate programme.

According to the Department of Education, the programme is "intended to meet the needs of those pupils who either choose not to opt for other Leaving Certificate Programmes". The programme is aimed at young people who have completed the Junior Certificate and students who have taken a FÁS course.

According to a 2014 Irish Examiner report, approximately 3,000 students completed the Leaving Certificate Applied programme, compared to approximately 57,000 who completed the established Leaving Certificate exam programme.

== See also ==
- Leaving Certificate Vocational Programme
