= State Examinations Commission =

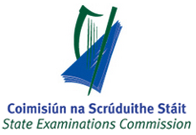

State Agency of the Department of Education overview
- Formed: 6 March 2003
- Preceding State Agency of the Department of Education: Examinations Branch, Department of Education
- Jurisdiction: Ireland
- Headquarters: Cornamaddy, Athlone, County Westmeath
- Employees: 185
- State Agency of the Department of Education executives: Andrea Feeney, Chief Executive; Patrick Burke, Chairman
- Key document: State Examinations Commission (Establishment) Order 2003
- Website: www.examinations.ie

The State Examinations Commission (Irish: Coimisiún na Scrúduithe Stáit) is the organisation that oversees the development, assessment and certification of second-level examinations in Ireland, namely the Junior Cycle and the Leaving Certificate. It replaced the Examinations Branch of the Department of Education in 2003.

== History ==
The State Examinations Commission is a State body established by statutory order on 6 March 2003. The Commission assumed responsibility for the operation of the State Certificate Examinations from the Department of Education.

The State Examinations Commission has an online system which allows examination candidates to view their results on its website.

== Organisation ==
The commission is staffed by civil servants and there are five Commissioners appointed by the Minister for Education.

== Functions ==
The commission oversees the state examinations at secondary education level in Ireland. Its offices are located in Athlone, County Westmeath. The two examinations the commission oversees for accreditation and certification are:

- Junior Cycle
- Leaving Certificate

Typically about 60,000 students present for each of these examinations each year, generally commencing on the first Wednesday of June. The commission holds the results of public examinations carried out by the Intermediate Education Board for Ireland (1879-1924), these include the Junior Grade, Middle Grade and Senior Grade. A list of the department's former examinations include:

Years	Examination
1924-1991	Intermediate Certificate
1929-1967	Primary Certificate
1947-1991	Day Vocational (Group) Certificate

== See also ==
- Education in the Republic of Ireland
