= Transition Year =

Optional one-year school programme in Ireland

Transition Year (TY; Irish: Idirbhliain) is an optional one-year school programme that can be taken in the year after the Junior Cycle in Ireland. However, depending on school population and funding it may not be available, and in other schools it is compulsory. For the most part the year is designed around giving students life skills, incorporating a work experience programme. There are also many trips available to the students, foreign and local, aimed at giving a more hands-on aspect to learning.

Transition Year was introduced as a pilot project in September 1974, but it was not until September 1994 that the programme was introduced mainstream. Transition Year is not examined, but rather is assessed (i.e. no written exams), and is intended to be a broad educational experience which assists in the transition from the school environment by encouraging creativity and responsibility for oneself. Approximately 75% of second-level schools offer the programme and it consists of both education and work experience. Schools generally set admissions criteria and design the programme based on local needs in accordance with departmental guidelines.

The year focuses on many non-academic subjects, such as life skills including first aid, cooking, self-defence, driving and typing. A lot of sport goes on, with many different types including: rock-climbing, hill-walking, horse-riding, sailing, kayaking and orienteering. Voluntary work is a requirement in many schools, with students helping out in local communities and charities. There are many programmes aimed at TY students such as TEFL For TY, Student Enterprise and Young Social Innovators (YSI).

Students in TY are also encouraged to take part in various competitions and programmes outside the school; these include BT Young Scientist, Gaisce: The President's Award and Junk Kouture. Many schools use TY as an opportunity to give their students different experiences by organising foreign exchanges, putting on school musicals, etc.

== Advantages ==
Transition Year can be considered to be a time for maturity and development. Activities such as work experience and mini-companies encourage growth and teamwork within the student body. New life skills can be learned such as first aid, cooking, self-defence and budgeting.

A report from the National Council for Curriculum and Assessment found that students who partake in Transition Year generally have higher Leaving Certificate results. It can give students previously unknown confidence in themselves.

== Criticism ==
In 2007, the Department of Education and Skills asserted that most teachers and principals are not really challenging students in Transition Year, based on official figures from a WSE report: "There was evidence that the content of certain subject areas lacked substance and that students were not being sufficiently challenged. It is strongly recommended that a root and branch review of the programme be undertaken."

In 2009, businessman Bill Cullen dismissed Transition Year as a “doss year” (an Irish slang expression meaning a school year in which little work is done).

In 2011, independent councillor Richard Finn said Transition Year was a doss year and costs parents a fortune.

In 2012, Dermot Kirwan of Friends of the Elderly criticized Transition Year for being a "self-indulgent luxury that we cannot afford" and was not "fit for purpose" given the current economic crisis.

== Participation ==
A study conducted by Transition Year Ireland based on figures obtained from the CSO showed that the uptake of Transition Year increased from 38.42% in 2001 to 63.55% in 2013. Percentages were calculated by comparing the number 4th (Transition) year students in any given year to the number of 3rd year students in the preceding year (nationally).

Uptake in other years were 38.35% in 2002, 39.57% in 2003, 41.33% in 2004, 45.41% in 2005, 47.43% in 2006, 48.86% in 2007, 50.44% in 2008, 52.75% in 2009, 54.34% in 2010, 57.94% in 2011, and 61.53% in 2012.

Mark English — described by Jerry Kiernan as Ireland's "greatest talent" ever in middle-distance running — first turned seriously to athletics during his Transition Year.
