= Leaving Certificate (Ireland) =

Irish secondary school leaving examination

- Acronym: LC
- Year started: 1925 (first examined)
- Score range: H1–H8; O1–O8; F1–F8
- Offered: Sixth Year (~17–19 years old)
- Restrictions on attempts: Repeating permitted with some restrictions
- Regions: Ireland
- Languages: English, Irish
- Annual number of test takers: ▲61,632 (in 2025)
- Prerequisites: Junior Cycle (Junior Certificate)
- Fee: €116
- Website: examinations.ie

The Leaving Certificate Examination (Irish: Scrúdú na hArdteistiméireachta), commonly referred to as the Leaving Cert or (informally) the Leaving (Irish: Ardteist), is the final exam of the Irish secondary school system and the university matriculation examination in Ireland. It takes a minimum of two years' preparation, but an optional Transition Year means that for those students it takes place three years after the Junior Cycle examination. These years are referred to collectively as the "Senior Cycle". Most students taking the examination are aged 16–19; in excess of eighty percent of this group undertake the exam. The Examination is overseen by the State Examinations Commission. The Leaving Certificate Examinations are taken annually by approximately 60,000 students.

The senior cycle is due to be reformed between 2025 and 2029, with all subjects having a 40% project assessment, separate to the traditional written examinations in June which would be worth the remaining 60%.

== Programmes ==
There are three distinct programmes that can be followed. While the outcomes of each programme are quite distinct, each is intended to reinforce the principles of secondary education – to prepare the student for education, society and work.

=== Established Leaving Certificate ===
The Established Leaving Certificate, introduced in 1924, is the most common programme taken. A minimum of five subjects are examined, including compulsory Irish. Exemption from the mandatory study of the Irish language is described in Circular M10/94 (Department of Education, Ireland, 1994) and the exemption can be acquired because of time spent living abroad or a learning disability such as dyslexia. Most students take seven subjects.

=== Leaving Certificate Vocational Programme ===
The Leaving Certificate Vocational Programme, introduced as a more practical "hands-on" complement to the conventional Leaving Certificate, is similar to the established programme.

=== Leaving Certificate Applied ===
The Leaving Certificate Applied, another variant of the traditional Leaving Certificate, is taken to prepare the student for adult and working life.

== Grading ==
=== Leaving Certificate ===
Percentage	Grade	CAO Points awarded		
Percentage	Grade	Higher	Ordinary	Foundation
90–100%	H1 / O1 / F1	100	56	20
80–89%	H2 / O2 / F2	88	46	12
70–79%	H3 / O3 / F3	77	37	0
60–69%	H4 / O4 / F4	66	28	0
50–59%	H5 / O5 / F5	56	20	0
40–49%	H6 / O6 / F6	46	12	0
30–39%	H7 / O7 / F7	37	0	0
0–29%	H8 / O8 / F8	0	0	0

Each subject is examined at one of three levels, Higher Level (informally called Honours), Ordinary Level (informally Pass), or Foundation Level. Foundation Level may only be taken in two subjects: Irish and Mathematics. All other subjects may be taken at either Ordinary or Higher Level. At each level, a percentage is assigned and translated to eight possible grades. These are usually written H1-H8, O1-O8 and F1-F8.

There have been proposals to impose a normal distribution on Leaving Certificate Examination scores, however, this ignores quantification problems and issues such as an A in one subject like Mathematics reflects greater attainment than an A in another subject.

Admission to universities and colleges is by a points system, run by the Central Applications Office (CAO). The points allocations shown in the accompanying table have been collectively agreed by the third-level institutions involved in the CAO scheme, and relativities that they imply have no official standing in the eyes of the State Examinations Commission or the Department of Education. The points awarded for a given percentage range are given in the table. Note that points for foundation level are only awarded for Mathematics, and only then by some institutions. A bonus for higher level Mathematics is part of the currently agreed system.

Mathematics bonus points Since 2012, a pass (minimum H6, originally D3) in higher level Mathematics is awarded 25 bonus points, making it possible to earn 125 points in this subject. Twenty-five bonus points are awarded for higher level Mathematics for H6 grades and above. For example, if an applicant receives an H6 grade, an additional 25 points will be added to the 46 points already awarded, i.e. higher level Mathematics now carries a score of 71 points. This also means that, provided they pass, the minimum number of points a student can receive is 71, which is 15 points greater than an O1 at Ordinary Level.

=== Leaving Certificate Vocational Programme ===
The Leaving Certificate Vocational Programme allows students to take link modules, which have their own grading scheme and associated CAO points.

LCVP Grade	Percentage range	CAO Points awarded	Equivalent
Gradam / Distinction (GD)	80 – 100	66	H4
Fiúntas / Merit (FM)	65 – 79	46	H6 or O2
Pas / Pass (PP)	50 – 64	28	O4

=== Predicted grades ===
In 2020, the Leaving Certificate was cancelled, due to the COVID-19 pandemic. This marked the first official cancellation in its existence. Leaving Certificate students were then given the choice of having teachers predict their own students' grades, which would then be nationally standardised. If students were not happy with their predicted grades, however, they could appeal their results and choose to sit a traditional exam in November 2020. The results would not be available in time for the 2020 academic year. In 2021, for each subject, candidates were given a choice to sit the Leaving Certificate examinations, take an Accredited Grade or opt for the better of the two. The examinations were extended over a 15-day period, instead of the usual 13 day period. The Accredited Grades are based on school-estimated marks and a standardisation process.

== Subjects available ==
The subjects listed below are available to Leaving Certificate students, though most schools only offer a limited number. The subjects are in five groups, with most subjects belonging to one group.

=== Language group ===
L1, Mandatory languages

- English (mandatory with exceptions)

L2, Native, Modern and Classical languages

- Irish (required by some universities for matriculation, mandatory with exceptions)
- Ancient Greek†
- Arabic
- French
- German
- Hebrew
- Italian
- Japanese
- Latin†
- Russian
- Spanish
- Portuguese
- Mandarin Chinese
- Polish
- Lithuanian
- Classical studies†

Taking a third, foreign language is mandatory in some secondary schools due to most courses in the National University of Ireland (NUI) universities (University of Galway, University College Cork, Maynooth University) requiring a foreign language as an entry requirement, usually excluding engineering and computer science related courses.

Non-curricular languages

The following languages can only be taken if the student is from a member state of the European Union, speaks the language in which they opt to be examined in as a mother tongue, has followed a programme of study leading to the Leaving Certificate and is taking Leaving Certificate English. Another condition is that candidate may undertake examination in one non-curricular language subject only.

- Bulgarian
- Croatian
- Czech
- Danish
- Dutch
- Estonian
- Finnish
- Greek
- Hungarian
- Latvian
- Maltese
- Romanian
- Slovak
- Slovene
- Swedish
- Ukrainian

=== Science group ===
Mathematics

- Mathematics (mandatory with exceptions)
- Applied mathematics

Laboratory sciences

- Physics†
- Chemistry†
- Biology
- Physics and chemistry (combined)† (also in applied science group)

=== Business studies group ===
- Accounting (formerly 'accountancy')
- Business (formerly 'business organisation')
- Economics†

Up to 2020, it was possible to study agricultural economics as a subject, but it was discontinued after revisions to the agricultural science and economics courses.

=== Applied science group ===
- Agricultural science
- Construction studies
- Engineering
- Home economics – scientific and social (also in social studies group)
- Physics and chemistry (combined)† (also in science group)
- Design and communication graphics (formerly 'technical drawing')
- Technology
- Computer science
- Physical education

Physical education (P.E.) was made an official Leaving Certificate subject as of 11 November 2017. Students can now receive grades for sport, dance and other activities. It was first implemented in September 2018 for incoming fifth year students and was first examined in 2020.

Computer science was introduced from September 2018 at 40 secondary schools. From September 2020 it was available to all schools in Ireland.

=== Social studies group ===
- Art
- Geography
- History
- Home economics – scientific and social (also in applied science group)
- Music
- Politics and society
- Religious education

==== Section footnotes ====
†Subject exclusions – candidates may not take any of the following subject combinations:

- Classical studies and Ancient Greek
- Classical studies and Latin
- Physics and chemistry (combined) and either physics (alone) or chemistry (alone)

The Leaving Certificate Vocational Programme (LCVP) is an additional link module which may be taken along with the other optional subjects. Students wishing to sit the LCVP Link Modules Exam had to meet specific requirements (this was dropped in September 2022). Pre-September 2022: Students had to take an extra language subject and must have had one or more of the following subject combinations:

Specialist groupings

1. Construction studies or engineering or technical drawing (any two)
2. Physics and construction studies or engineering
3. Agricultural science and construction studies or engineering
4. Agricultural science and chemistry or physics or physics and chemistry (combined subject)
5. Home economics and agricultural science or biology
6. Home economics and art
7. Accounting or business or economics (any two)
8. Physics and chemistry
9. Biology and agricultural science
10. Biology and chemistry or physics or physics and chemistry (combined)

Services groupings

11. Engineering and business or accounting or economics
12. Construction studies and business or accounting or economics
13. Home economics and business or accounting or economics
14. Agricultural science and business or accounting or economics
15. Art and business or accounting or economics
16. Music and business or accounting or economics

== Exam format ==
Subjects are examined through a number of methods. These include at least one written paper (English, Mathematics, Irish and some of the optional courses contain two written papers).

Language courses examine the student's writing, conversation and listening skills. The spoken section of the exams ('oral') takes place some months before the written exams, and the listening ('aurals') takes place in the same weeks as the written.

A number of subjects in the sciences and arts include the keeping of records or creation of a physical object or project. This work is designed to provide tangible proof of the students' abilities. However, not every book or project is examined, with inspectors being sent to a small few, randomly selected schools each year, or simply examining a small selection of projects from each class to check the standard. Some subjects such as Art and Technology involve a practical exam which is supervised by an external examiner. In the academic year of the written exam, all practical science subjects are partially examined by student assignments which involve less focus on traditional exam formats and getting students to put the theory they have learned into practice, typically through a project which involves the creation of unique artifacts.

=== Variants ===
Each subject's paper at Leaving Certificate level may have as few as two variants, or as many as six. They are divided by level: Higher and Ordinary, and in the case of Irish and Mathematics, Foundation. Each subject level-variant will also have provisions for both English and Irish speakers, with the exception of English and Irish themselves (which are printed exclusively in the relevant language). Certain subjects are printed in a combined English/Irish format, such as French or German. This leaves such subjects with only two versions: a bilingual Higher, and a bilingual Ordinary. However, Mathematics, in contrast, has a total of six: three levels: Higher, Ordinary and Foundation, each with both English and Irish versions.

Higher Level papers are printed on pink paper, while Ordinary Level papers are printed on powder blue paper. In the case of certain subjects, such as Geography, full-colour photographs need to be printed and as such, all pages but the cover are white.

=== Senior cycle reform ===
In 2018, the Department of Education alongside the National Council for Curriculum and Assessment (NCCA) confirmed that the senior cycle was under review with Politics and Society, Physical Education, and Computer Science the first of the new subjects to be part of the reforms. Core subjects such as Irish, English, Mathematics, and European languages would be changed in due course.

In March 2022, Minister for Education Norma Foley announced plans for the senior cycle to be reformed, requesting the NCCA to prepare a schedule of senior cycle subjects to be reviewed and redeveloped. Foley also requested two new subjects to be developed, Drama, Film and Theatre Studies; and Climate Action and Sustainable Development.

Further changes were announced with all subjects to include an assessment worth 40% of the total grade, such as a research project, oral assessment, portfolio or an experiment, separate to the traditional written examinations in June which would be worth the remaining 60%. The phased reforms would commence for fifth year students in September 2025, with biology, chemistry, physics, business, Arabic, Latin and Ancient Greek seeing the first changes, while further amendments would take place between 2026 and 2029.

There were serious disagreements and outrage over the planned senior cycle reform. Second level teachers held lunchtime protests outside schools in November 2024 in a bid to delay the planned changes.

== Exam paper leaks ==
=== 1957 ===
In 1957, papers in Latin, English and Mathematics became available to some students before the exams. Supplemental examinations were held later in June.

=== 1969 ===
On 12 June 1969, exam papers were stolen in a break-in to a Dublin secondary school. Examination papers, including English, Mathematics and Physics were circulated among students. The repeat examinations for English and Mathematics paper 2 were rescheduled for 27 June 1969 and 28 June 1969 respectively.

=== 2009 ===
On the first day of examinations on 3 June 2009, the second paper of the Leaving Certificate English examination (initially scheduled for 4 June) was accidentally distributed instead of Paper 1 at an examination centre in St. Oliver's Community College in Drogheda. It was confirmed that a number of candidates had seen the paper before the mistake was acted upon. The invigilator had failed to report the incident straight away and was immediately suspended. A State Examinations Commission (SEC) official had visited the examination centre on the day in question as part of a routine inspection, and no report was made by the invigilator to the official. Owing to the time at which the SEC was informed, it was unable to distribute the contingency paper in time for the following morning. Details of the leaked paper had already circulated onto many online message boards and social networking sites, many hours after the incident had taken place. The exam was rescheduled for Saturday 6 June, from 09:30 to 12:50. About 10 Jewish students, who could not sit the exam at the rescheduled time because it conflicted with Shabbat, were sent to an Orthodox household in Dublin, where they were sequestered from all electronic media (as is normal for Shabbat) and kept under supervision until they sat the exam on Sunday morning.

== Matriculation to university using the Leaving Certificate ==
=== Qualification for domestic universities ===
Matriculation is administered by the Central Applications Office (CAO) following requirements laid down by the universities. Applicants must present English and Mathematics, while certain universities also require Irish and/or a foreign language. Some courses require specific subjects to be taken at secondary level. For example, veterinary medicine applicants must present with a minimum grade of H5 in Chemistry at higher level. Most commonly, engineering and science programmes require Mathematics and/or a physical science. Other courses, such as Medicine, have similar matriculation requirements. From 2012 onwards, the greatest CAO points that can be achieved in the Leaving Certificate is 625 points, equivalent to six Higher Level H1s and 25 bonus points for passing (scoring an H6 or higher) Higher-Level Mathematics. Every year, approximately 150 students score the maximum grade with 10–20 students receiving seven H1s or more.

Generally, students are required to have pass grades in English, Mathematics, Irish and/or a foreign language to gain entry to university. The concept of failing the Leaving Certificate is not applied. When demand exceeds supply for a university course (the norm), the CAO will award a candidate's points based on their Leaving Certificate performance in six subjects. The majority of candidates take six to eight subjects, including English, Mathematics and Irish (exemptions available) and usually a foreign language, with the points from their six highest-scoring subjects being considered. Once base criteria have been met, course places are offered to the applicants with the highest points.

Subjects taken at foundation level are rarely counted for matriculation to university.

Some universities require a foreign language and Irish. Exemptions are available for learning difficulties, birth outside Ireland, not having taken Irish before the age of eleven years, and studying abroad for a period of at least two years after the age of eleven.

==== After 2017 ====
The Department of Education introduced a new Leaving Certificate grading scale in 2017. The new scale has eight grades, the highest being a Grade 1, the lowest being a Grade 8. The highest seven grades 1-7 divide the marks range 100% to 30% into seven equal grade bands 10% wide, with a grade 8 being awarded for percentage marks of less than 30%. The grades at Higher Level and Ordinary Level are distinguished by prefixing the grade with H or O respectively, giving H1-H8 at higher level, and O1-O8 at ordinary level. This new 8-point grading scale replaces the former 14-point scale at both Higher and Ordinary levels. Previously, the majority of students receiving a given grade were within three percentage marks of a higher grade, and five extra points, creating pressure towards rote learning and using the marking scheme to gain those few additional marks. The new broader grade bands eases the pressure on students to achieve marginal gains in examinations and encourage more substantial engagement with each subject. The new grading system also allows for greater flexibility, variety, and innovation in Leaving Certificate assessments. The broader objective is to allow for an enhanced learner experience in senior cycle, with a greater focus on the achievement of broader learning objectives. The new eight-point scale moves the Leaving Certificate closer to school leaving examinations in other countries, such as Scotland, England, Wales and Northern Ireland, Finland, and to the International Baccalaureate.

==== Historical CAO points system ====
1992–2016 Common Points System (6 subjects)
	Grade Boundary	Higher	Ordinary	Foundation
A1	90 – 100	100	60	20
A2	85 < 90	90	50	15
B1	80 < 85	85	45	10
B2	75 < 80	80	40	5
B3	70 < 75	75	35	
C1	65 < 70	70	30	
C2	60 < 65	65	25	
C3	55 < 60	60	20	
D1	50 < 55	55	15	
D2	45 < 50	50	10	
D3	40 < 45	45	5	

From 1992 to 2016, subdivided A, B, C, D, E, F and NG grades were awarded at the Leaving Certificate. A common points system was used by the CAO using six subjects. From 2012, 25 bonus points were given for higher-level Mathematics at D grades and above. Before, the University of Limerick awarded up to 40 bonus points for Mathematics (Higher Level) in an increasing scale of points starting at five bonus points for a C3 continuing up to 40 for an A1 grade. This was an attempt to correct the decline in demand for scientific subjects. In 2009, 16.2% of students attempted the higher level Mathematics paper.

Before 1992, the Leaving Certificate awarded A, B, C, D, E, F and NG grades without subdivisions, providing broader grade bands similar to those introduced in 2017. While there was a common application system from the 1970s, the method of calculating points varied from institution to institution and even type of qualification, up to 1991. The number of subjects considered for points and Mathematics bonuses were not consistent. For example, in some cases bonus points for Mathematics only applied for particular courses (e.g. Dublin Institute of Technology applied bonus points for engineering only).

1991 Points System
	#Subjects	Higher				Ordinary				Higher Maths			
	Considered	A	B	C	D	A	B	C	D	A	B	C	D
DIT (degree)	6	9	7	6	4	5	3	2	1	14	12	10	
DCU	6	7	5	4	2	3	1						
Maynooth	6	6	5	4	3	2	1			7	5	4	2
RTC/DIT (cert)	6	100	80	60	40	60	45	30	15				
TCD	5	55	45	30	10	10	8	6	4				
UCC/UCD	6	5	4	3	2	2	1			7	5	4	2
UCG	7	10	8	6	3	4	2	3	1				
UL	6	14	11	8	5	6	3	1		22	16	10	

=== University outside of Ireland ===
Some Irish students go to university in the United Kingdom, particularly in Northern Ireland and larger British cities.

In recognition of this, the Established Leaving Certificate underwent a process with the British Universities and Colleges Admissions Service (UCAS) to gain entry to the UCAS Tariff for direct entry to United Kingdom universities. This introduced the examination directly onto the Tariff, allowing it to be compared more easily with other qualifications on the Tariff. After comparing syllabi of the Irish Leaving Certificate and British GCE A-Levels, it was decided that a Leaving Certificate (higher) subject will be worth two-thirds of an A-level (UK, except Scotland). This is because Leaving Certificate students undertake several more subjects (often a total of six to eight) than a typical A level student, but as a result study them in a more narrow fashion.

Increasingly, Irish students are making use of universities situated within the European Union such as the Netherlands, Germany, Sweden, France, Spain, Italy and Poland. Many universities in central and eastern Europe provide courses in English to attract students from Ireland and other countries. A small number of students apply to attend universities outside of Europe, including the United States, Canada, and Australia.

== Dates ==
The exams usually begin on the first Wednesday in June, traditionally commencing with English Paper One, followed by Paper Two on Thursday afternoon. The exams typically last two and a half weeks, but may last longer for students taking exams in uncommon subjects, such as non-curricular languages. Exams were cancelled or postponed in 2020 because of the COVID-19 pandemic.

The exam timetable was reorganised in 2008 to reduce the intensity of the exam period. Particular changes included the moving of English Paper Two to Thursday afternoon, as opposed to its usual time of Wednesday afternoon after English Paper One, to reduce the amount of writing candidates were required to do at the beginning of the exams.

A superstition currently exists in Ireland that the weather across the country noticeably improves the moment the exams begin.

== Response to the COVID-19 pandemic ==
=== 2020 ===
Owing to the COVID-19 pandemic, then Minister for Education and Skills, Joe McHugh, announced on 10 April 2020 that the exams would be postponed and begin on 29 July to early August. This announcement faced backlash as a poll found 71% of parents were against the solution and wanted an alternative. A campaign was set up with the aim of replacing the Leaving Cert with predicted grades, with a petition on CancelTheLC.com receiving 20,000 signatures. Political pressure also occurred as the Fianna Fáil and Sinn Féin parties were critical of the solution and urged the Leaving Certificate exams to be cancelled.

On 8 May 2020, it was announced that the exams would not go ahead in the summer based on medical evidence stating that it would not be safe to do so. All students were to be offered the option to accept calculated grades instead of sitting postponed exams that would go on at a later date when it would be safe to run exams. This faced controversy: in particular, a step involving "school profiling" became a topic of debate in government. Concerns about parental efforts to influence grades given by teachers, or fears that they would sue teachers for giving bad grades, were also raised. Teachers were also expected to announce any conflict of interest they may have in grading their students.

On 21 May 2020, the Association of Secondary Teachers, Ireland instructed its members to not follow the new calculated guidelines unless they were given greater legal protection, but this issue was resolved the following day. Students were asked to register for calculated grades, and over 98% of them did so.

For students who wanted to take the examinations, the Leaving Certificate was run from 16 November–11 December 2020 in the evenings and at weekends.

=== 2021 ===
In 2021, the Leaving Certificate was also changed. The calculated grades methodology was revised and now known as Accredited Grades.

The Education (Leaving Certificate 2021) (Accredited Grades) Act 2021 was brought to Dáil Éireann by Minister for Education Norma Foley and signed by the President on 25 May 2021. It created the grounds for the State Examinations Commission to conduct the Accredited Grades process (as opposed to the Department of Education and Skills in 2020) and laid out provisions to protect the integrity of the Accredited Grades process. Interference such as contacting teachers, principals, or tutors in any manner that could influence their judgement could be punished by the State Examinations Commission withholding any or all of the Accredited Grades of a student.

New consultants, Educational Testing Services, a US-based non-profit organisation were contracted to build the process. The model was similar to the calculated grades model of 2020 but with code improvements.

Students were offered the choice of Accredited Grades, the option to sit the Leaving Cert in June of that year, or both options. Unlike in 2020, students were also given the choice to select which of the three options they desired for each subject they would take in the Leaving Certificate. Ireland is believed to be the only country that had such a system in 2021. In the case where a grade for a subject was produced from both the written examination or an Accredited Grade, the system would award a student the higher of the two grades, regardless of any other factors. Students made their decisions on which subjects for the Leaving Cert they wished to present for, and which manner of grades they wanted on the Candidate Self-Service Portal (CSSP) website. It was later revealed that the SEC would generate Accredited Grades for all students where possible, even if they chose not to participate in the Accredited Grades process.

Participation of the written examinations were lower than in years previous to 2020. 5,087 students opted to not do any written examinations. However, there were no penalties to opting into doing the written examination in a subject (along with the Accredited Grade), and not showing up to the examination. Only 60% of written papers that were opted into were actually done by students. This led to an excess of exam scripts after the examinations.

Grade inflation became a problem. The Central Applications Office (CAO) expressed concern about the continued value of Leaving Certificates.

H1s	2019	2020	2021
9	0	3	3
8	7	46	119
7	69	243	544
6	196	419	910
Total H1 grades	4%	7%	10%

== International usage ==
Only one school outside Ireland offers the Leaving Certificate exam to their students. Since 1997, students at the ISM international school in Tripoli, Libya take the Leaving Cert with Arabic being substituted for Irish and Libyan history for Irish history.

== See also ==
- Central Applications Office
- Education in the Republic of Ireland
- Grinds
- Post Leaving Certificate
