= Junior Cycle =

Educational programme for Irish second-level schools

Junior Cycle (Junior Certificate.)
- Acronym: JC
- Type: Digital / Oral / Written-based
- Administrator: National Council for Curriculum and Assessment (NCCA) and the State Examinations Commission
- Purpose: To provide a well-balanced, general education to students who wish to enter on more advanced courses of study
- Duration: ~ 2 weeks
- Offered: Once a year
- Languages: English, Irish, other EU languages
- Annual number of test takers: 71,494 (2023)
- Prerequisites: At least 12 years of age on year of admission and must have completed primary education
- Fee: €109 (2026)
- Website: ncca.ie/en/junior-cycle/

The Junior Cycle (Irish: An tSraith Shóisearach) is the first stage of the education programme for post-primary education within the Republic of Ireland. It is overseen by the Department of Education and Youth and the National Council for Curriculum and Assessment (NCCA), and its terminal examination, the Junior Certificate, by the State Examinations Commission.

New specifications and curriculum reforms saw the Junior Cycle replaced the original Junior Certificate programme (as first introduced in 1992). The revised curriculum was introduced on a gradual phased basis from 2014, and the process was completed in 2022. A Junior Cycle Profile of Achievement is issued to students who have successfully achieved a minimum standard in their Junior Cycle assessments and examinations.

A "recognised pupil" who commences the Junior Cycle must reach at least 12 years of age on 1 January of the school year of admission and must have completed primary education; the examination is normally taken after three years' study in a secondary school.

== History ==
=== Intermediate Certificate ===
Intermediate Certificate ("Inter Cert"): (Irish: Teastas Idirmheánach) introduced in 1924; originally for pupils at voluntary secondary schools (often boarding schools) after 3 or 4 years of study.

=== Group Certificate ===
Group, or Day Vocational, Certificate ("Group Cert", or "Day Cert"): (Irish: Teastas Grúpa, Teastas na nGairmchúrsaí Lae) introduced in 1947 for pupils at vocational schools after 2 years of study. The syllabuses of the Group Cert and Inter Cert were coordinated from 1968.

=== Junior certificate history ===
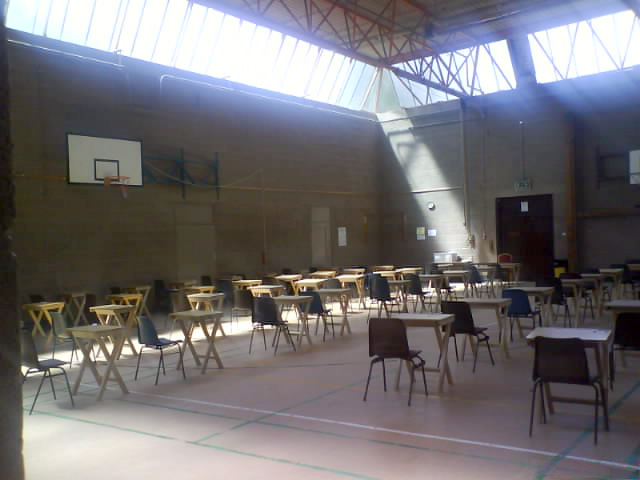
A typical exam hall.

The first Junior Certificate syllabus was introduced in 1989 and examined in 1992. The new, modern Junior Certificate course was described as intended to address shortcomings of the older Intermediate Certificate with a more balanced, student-friendly curriculum.

Near the end of the 1990s, the Department of Education and Science began to replace many subject curricula, particularly those that were deemed dated, such as History and Geography. In 1999, Civic, Social, and Political Education was introduced as a subject and made mandatory from 2000, when Religious Education was also brought in. Religion was phased in with just a few schools adopting it in its first year, but now nearly all do the exam for Junior Cert, whilst CSPE was implemented nationwide.

In 2002 a new Science course was introduced, with emphasis on greater class participation and introduction of the awarding of a percentage of marks for class practicals throughout the three years. However, many teachers complained about a lack of information from the department about this change, and sample papers were not released until early 2006, the year when the new exam would be sat for the first time. Also, some schools complained that they did not have the laboratory facilities to do the new course but were forced to teach it anyway.

In 2004, results were made available on the Internet for the first time thus allowing students who, for instance, had moved school or left school to get their results without having to return to their old school. The low rate of students taking higher level Maths has been a consistent issue throughout the history of the Junior Certificate. However, this rate has increased in recent years.

=== Transition to the modern Junior Cycle ===
Throughout the late 1990s and early 2000s, the Department of Education and Skills produced research and studies on what changes needed to be made to education in Ireland.

In late 2009, the Government briefly considered scrapping Junior Cert examinations permanently. The move was met with criticism and outrage from the Teachers' Union (ASTI), but the Government said that scrapping the annual examinations and replacing them with continuous assessment would save the country €30 million.

In 2011, the National Council for Curriculum and Assessment (NCCA) published reports proposing a major reform of the Junior Cycle following consultations with stakeholders, and amid concern over the heavy emphasis on "teaching to the test" in secondary schools. However, by October 2012 Teachers Unions and educationalists criticised the proposal by former Minister for Education and Skills Ruairi Quinn to abolish state exams in the Junior Cycle and 100 percent assessment by teachers.

On 15 January 2014, the Department of Education and Skills announced that the new name for the Junior Certificate would be called the "Junior Cycle Student Award". After much delay and changes made to the framework by April 2014, teacher unions began industrial action, starting with the policy of non-cooperation with planning measures due to concerns in relation to impartially around correcting students assessments. The government agreed to not scrap the Junior Certificate and instead, introduce a brand new syllabus in English for students starting first year of secondary school in September 2014, with only 90% of the test going for a written exam. The other 10% was an assessment task taken during the third year. This was a reflection of the learning from the second classroom-based assessment (CBA).

By 2015; the finalized report 'Framework for Junior Cycle' was circulated by the Department of Education and Skills issued by the former Minister for Education Jan O'Sullivan. Education reform at post-primary was largely supported by all Government parties, despite political changes in government over the years; the largest political parties Fianna Fáil, Fine Gael and Labour continued to promote the framework issued by the NCCA. The 'Framework for Junior Cycle' provided a timeline of when the changes would occur over a gradual basis.

In 2016, pilots of the new system had been underway for three years, with the principal of St Joseph's College, Lucan, in particular noting that the "engagement in learning" proved to be a panacea for the school's discipline problems.

In 2017, English became the first subject to be issued with the new grading system. Science and Business were then reformed in 2016; Irish, Mathematics and French in 2017; History and Geography in 2019. The full Junior Certificate was revised into the Junior Cycle Profile of Achievement in 2022.

== Junior Certificate ==
Junior Certificate
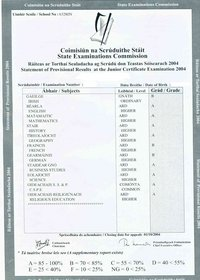
- The Junior Certificate result sheet
- Acronym: JC
- Type: Paper-based
- Administrator: State Examinations Commission
- Purpose: To provide a well-balanced, general education to students who wish to enter on more advanced courses of study
- Year started: 1992
- Duration: 1 hour 30 minutes – 2 hours
- Score range: Not Graded (NG) to Distinction (DN)
- Offered: Once a year
- Languages: English, Irish
- Annual number of test takers: 73,336 (2025)
- Prerequisites: At least 12 years of age on year of admission and must have completed primary education
- Fee: €109 (2026)
- Website: www.examinations.ie

The Junior Certificate (Irish: Teastas Sóisearach) or "Junior Cert" for short, is an educational qualification awarded in Ireland by the Department of Education and Youth to students who have successfully completed the junior cycle of secondary education and achieved a minimum standard in their Junior Certificate Examination (Irish: Scrúdú an Teastais Shóisearaigh).

A student takes up to ten subjects – including English, Irish and Mathematics – as part of the Junior Cycle. The examination does not reach the standards for college or university entrance; instead, a school leaver in Ireland will typically take the Leaving Certificate examination two or three years after completion of the Junior Certificate to reach that standard.

The objective of the Junior Cycle is:

...to provide a well-balanced, general education suitable for pupils who leave full-time education at the end of compulsory schooling or, alternatively, who wish to enter on more advanced courses of study.

=== The Examination ===
The final examination takes place after three years of the course, in early June. The exams always start with English, then the other core subjects and finish with the subjects that have the fewest candidates. They usually last two and a half weeks. The exams can take the form of written papers, aural exams (which are usually included at the start of the written paper) or practical exams (for example, in Music, 25% of the final result is based on a performance and skills test in front of an examiner). Exams normally range from one and a half to two hours long.

Schools with students taking the examinations will have one or more examination centres (individual enclosed rooms in which examinations take place), and almost always at least two, because the Leaving Certificate and Junior Certificate examinations cannot take place in the same centre. Smaller centres can be used for students with reasonable accommodations because of a learning or writing difficulty. Each exam centre is supervised by an external superintendent, usually a teacher from another school or an employee of the SEC. A staff member of the school is hired as an examination aide by the SEC to act as a liaison between the SEC and the school officials during the examination period. Candidates may not enter the exam centre after the first 30 minutes and are permitted to leave the centre after 30 minutes have passed, up until the last 15 minutes of the examination, although this practice has been abolished in some schools, and is discouraged in many others.

The Irish Times published an article where teachers expressed their concern that some syllabi for certain subjects (e.g. Business Studies) were not "up-to-date" with current events and would therefore not encourage students enough to think independently and apply theory to real-world scenarios.

=== Levels ===
At the Junior Certificate, students can take an examination subject at one of three levels. These are:

- Higher Level (Irish: Ardleibhéal; sometimes called "Honours") – available only in English, Irish and Mathematics.
- Ordinary Level (Irish: Gnáthleibhéal; sometimes called "Pass") – available only in English, Irish and Mathematics.
- Common Level (Irish: Leibhéal Comónta) – available in all subjects except English, Irish and Mathematics.

The level taken at Junior Certificate may have bearing on the level taken in the Leaving Certificate; thus, for instance, a student could take an Ordinary level in the Junior Certificate and then could not take a Higher level in the corresponding Leaving Certificate subject, later.

=== Grading ===
==== Language Format under the Languages Act ====
In the Junior Certificate candidates have the option of answering either in Irish (only if they have been in the Irish stream) or in English, except in the case of the subjects Irish and English and questions in other language subjects. Certain subjects and components are not available for bonus marks, marks awarded also vary depending on the written nature of the subject.

==== Exemptions ====
Students who face disadvantages (e.g. suffer spelling problems caused by dyslexia, dyspraxia, dysgraphia, or other disorders such as Autism Spectrum Disorder or ADHD) cannot be penalised for poor spelling in exams such as English and Irish. These candidates will then be marked more leniently on all topics (e.g. if a student has a spelling problem in English they will be marked out of 50 for their mechanics).

=== Results ===
Junior Cert results are not a prerequisite for the Leaving Certificate, so that all students may continue to their next year of education no matter what their results. The Junior Certificate (and more so, the Leaving Certificate) results take centre place in the Irish media during the week surrounding their release. The newspapers publish various statistics about the exam and cover high achievers (some receive ten or more "A" grades). In 2019, much controversy was caused by the delaying of the results from the usual 12–15 September dates until 4 October. The 2022 exam was the first to be held in two years due to the COVID-19 pandemic with results being issued on 23 November due to a shortage of examiners and the prioritisation given to marking the Leaving Certificate.

==== Appeals of grades ====
If a student is unhappy with a grade they received on any of the exam results, they may appeal the decision made by the SEC. They need to pay a fee (in 2010 the fee was set at €32 per subject) and the principal of the school will have to write a letter of appeal application to the State Examinations Commission, stating the candidate's name, exam number and the exam they would like to appeal. There is a deadline to appeal, usually 14–21 days after the results are published. The appeal results are usually issued mid-November. The grade that is received after appeal is final. If the candidate's grade does not change, no further action will be taken. However, if a change does occur, then the candidate will be refunded the appeal fee via a cheque made out to the principal of the school. These refunds take time to be issued, and in an appeal made in September of one year, the refund was issued as late as March in the following year.

=== Drop-outs ===
Although school attendance in Ireland is very high, some students drop out of the education system after completion of the Junior Certificate. Those who stay in the education system sit the Leaving Certificate – the requirement for university entry in Ireland. A new type of Leaving Certificate, the Leaving Certificate Applied has been designed to discourage people from dropping out. This is all practical work and students may work after school or do an apprenticeship, respectively.

The vast majority of students continue from junior level to senior level, with only 12.3% leaving after the Junior Certificate. This is lower than the EU average of 15.2%.

== Junior cycle framework ==
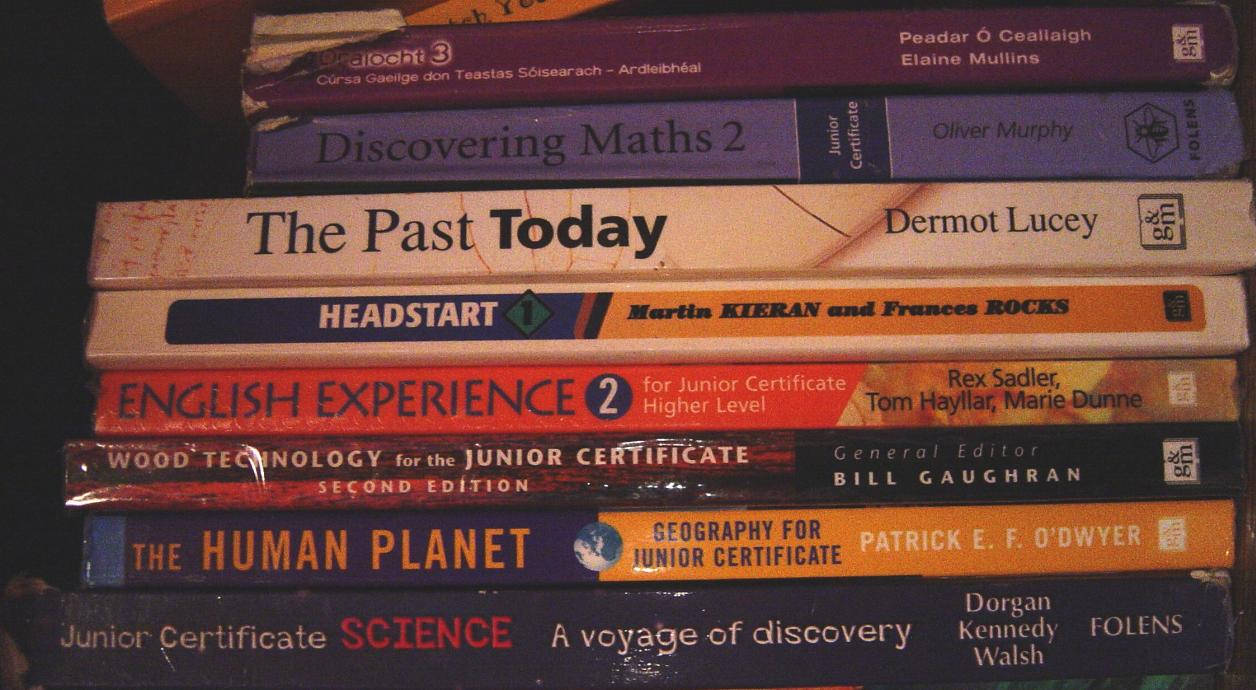
Some Junior Certificate course books

The NCCA issued a new language and policy around post-primary education in Ireland. Each subject curriculum will be replaced by 'specifications' supported by Key Skills (6 in total) and 24 Statements of Learning.

All subjects incorporate all six key skills, however, most subjects only incorporate some of the Statements of Learning. The new framework issued by the NCCA proposed the development of Short Courses; the NCCA has issued specifications for some Short Courses however, schools have the opportunity to create their own short courses that are relevant to their school community.

Built into the specifications and short courses is a re-emphasis on literacy and numeracy. Student-centred learning is to the fore in these specifications along with in-class assessments and written examinations.

Changes have been made to subject levels; under the Junior Certificate Examinations framework there were three levels, Higher, Ordinary and Foundation. Under the framework for Junior Cycle reforms, only Irish, Maths and English have two levels (Higher and Ordinary), while all other subjects have one 'common level'.

Students can only study up to 10 subjects; under the previous Junior Certificate there was no limit.

A "recognised junior pupil" must undertake all the mandatory subjects and at least two of the optional subjects, except insofar as exemptions or exclusions apply. In certain types of schools, subjects in the optional grouping (or a selection from combinations of them) may, in fact, be mandatory, for instance, History and Geography are mandatory in certain types of schools. Most schools do not offer all the optional subjects but must offer all the mandatory and certain optional subjects.

=== Mandatory subjects ===
- Irish/Gaeilge (Higher or Ordinary)†
- English (Higher or Ordinary)
- Maths (Higher or Ordinary)
- History (Special Core Status)

† An exemption from taking Irish may be awarded in some cases, for students with a specific learning difficulty such as dyslexia or Autism Spectrum Disorder, or those who did not attend school in the country before their twelfth birthday.

=== Common level subjects ===
==== Arts and Humanities ====
- Visual Art
- Classical Studies‡
- Music (Listening, Composing & General Study)
- Religious education (Some schools do Religious Education without examining it)
- Business studies

‡Classical Studies can not be taken by a student who is also taking Greek or Latin.

==== Modern languages ====
- French
- German
- Spanish
- Italian

==== Sciences ====
- Geography
- Home Economics
- Science

==== Applied Sciences ====
- Wood Technology
- Engineering
- Graphics
- Technology

==== Deprecated subjects ====
- Typewriting (2016 was the final year of examination, per Department of Education Circular 0061/2014)
- Latin (2019 was the final year of examination)
- Ancient Greek (2019 was the final year of examination)

=== Short courses ===
The NCCA has circulated specifications for 'Short Courses', which are part of, or linked to, the Junior Cycle. Students taking such courses will be introduced to a variety of subjects which are linked to the statements of learning and are designed for approximately 100 hours of student engagement. 10 short courses have been introduced to date, however schools have the opportunity to develop their own Short Courses which reflect their school community as long as they fit into the framework for Junior Cycle. Students have the opportunity to take up to 4 short courses and substitute these for more long-form non-mandatory subjects.

The short courses available include eight courses at the 3rd level of the National Framework of Qualifications, the first three of which are offered as potential elements of the school wellbeing programme:

- Civic, Social and Political Education
- Social, Personal and Health Education
- Physical Education
- Coding
- Digital Media Literacy
- Artistic Performance
- Chinese Language and Culture
- Philosophy

and two other courses:

- A Personal Project: Caring for Animals
- Exploring Forensic Science

while a further course is to be developed:

- Enterprise and Animation.

== Assessment and examinations ==
On completion, a Junior Cycle Profile of Achievement (JCPA) is issued to students by their schools, which record learning arising from short courses; classroom assessments and the results of state exams. For every subject, students engage with two structured classroom-based assessments (CBAs), one each in second and third year. A written assessment task supervised by teachers in class is completed in third year and marked by the State Examinations Commission. In 2022 and 2023, students completed only one classroom-based assessment in each subject and were not required to complete assessment tasks due to disrupted learning caused by the COVID-19 pandemic.

Most subjects have up to two in-class assessments and subjects such as Geography, Science and History have a project to complete. The final examination takes place after three years of the course, in early June. The exams always start with English, then the other core subjects and finish with the subjects that have the fewest candidates.

=== Irish ===
In the Junior Certificate candidates have the option of answering either in Irish (only if they have been in the Irish stream) or in English, except in the case of the subjects Irish and English and questions in other language subjects. Certain subjects and components are not available for bonus marks, marks awarded also vary depending on the written nature of the subject.

=== Exemptions ===
Students who face disadvantages (e.g. suffer spelling problems caused by dyslexia, dyspraxia, dysgraphia, or other disorders such as Autism Spectrum Disorder or ADHD) cannot be penalised for poor spelling or grammar in exams such as English and Irish. These candidates will then be marked easier on all topics (e.g. if a student has a spelling problem in English they will be marked out of 50 for their mechanics).

=== Junior Cycle grading ===
In 2017, English transitioned to a new grading system as part of the new Junior Cycle, replacing an older system of grades A-F and NG. This was introduced into other subjects, with examination in Science and Business Studies starting in 2019.

The grading structure is as follows:

- 85 to 100% = Distinction
- 70 to 84% = Higher Merit
- 55 to 69% = Merit
- 40 to 54% = Achieved
- 20 to 39% = Partially Achieved
- 0 to 19% = Not Graded/NG

while the previous system had A for 86 to 100%, B for 70 to 85, etc.

== After the exam ==
It is not possible to fail the Junior Cycle overall: all students may continue to their next year of education regardless of their results.

The Junior Cycle / Junior Certificate (and even more, the Leaving Certificate) results take centre stage in the Irish media during the week surrounding their release. National and local newspapers publish various statistics about the exam and cover high achievers.

== Transition year ==
Transition Year (TY) (Irish: Idirbhliain) is a one-year programme that can be taken in the year after the Junior Certificate in Ireland, making the senior cycle of secondary school a three-year programme encompassing both Transition Year and the preparation for the Leaving Certificate. Transition Year is optional at national level, but some schools mandate it. Transition Year was created as a result of the Programme for Economic and Social Progress which called for a six-year cycle of post-primary education.

== See also ==
- Education in the Republic of Ireland
- Irish Leaving Certificate
