= Index of women scientists articles =

== A ==
- A. Catrina Bryce
- A. Elizabeth Adams
- Abby Howe Turner
- Abella
- Ada Lovelace
- Ada Yonath
- Adele Goldberg (computer scientist)
- Adrienne Mayor
- Aglaonike
- Agnes Arber
- Agnes Fay Morgan Research Award
- Agnes Mary Clerke
- Agnes Pockels
- Agnes Sime Baxter
- Agnodice
- Aisling Judge
- Alejandra Bravo
- Alenush Terian
- Alexia Massalin
- Alice Ball
- Alice Chien Chang
- Alice Cunningham Fletcher
- Alice Eastwood
- Alice L. Kibbe
- Alice Leigh-Smith
- Alice Middleton Boring
- Alice Miller (psychologist)
- Alice Pegler
- Alice Stewart
- Alice Y. Ting
- Alicia Boole Stott
- Allene Jeanes
- Allison Randal
- Almira Hart Lincoln Phelps
- Amalie Dietrich
- Amanda Chessell
- Ana Aslan
- Anat Cohen-Dayag
- Andrea Bertozzi
- Andrea Brand
- Annette Dolphin
- Angela Clayton
- Angela Merkel
- Angela Orebaugh
- Angioletta Coradini
- Anita Borg
- Anita Goel
- Anita Harding
- Anita K. Jones
- Anita Roberts
- Anja Cetti Andersen
- Ann Bishop (biologist)
- Ann Haven Morgan
- Ann Kiessling
- Ann Nelson
- Anna Atkins
- Anna Botsford Comstock
- Anna J. Harrison
- Anna Karlin
- Anna Mani
- Anna Maria Hussey
- Anna Morandi Manzolini
- Anna Nagurney
- Anna Stecksén
- Anna Sundström
- Anna Winlock
- Lady Anne Brewis
- Anne Condon
- Anne Elizabeth Ball
- Anne H. Ehrlich
- Anne McLaren
- Anne Rudloe - PhD Marine Biology
- Anne Simon
- Anne Stine Ingstad
- Anne Thynne
- Anne Warner (scientist)
- Annette Salmeen
- Annie Antón
- Annie Curtis
- Annie Dale Biddle Andrews
- Annie Easley
- Annie Francé-Harrar
- Annie Jump Cannon
- Annie Lorrain Smith
- Annie Meinertzhagen
- Annie Scott Dill Maunder
- Anousheh Ansari
- Antje Boetius
- Antonia Maury
- Arete of Cyrene
- Ariel Hollinshead
- Arfa Karim
- Artemisia II of Caria
- Ashawna Hailey
- Asima Chatterjee
- Association for Women Geoscientists
- Association for Women in Mathematics
- Astrid Cleve
- Audrey Stuckes
- Audrey Tang
- Ayanna Howard

== B ==
- Barbara A. Schaal
- Barbara J. Meyer
- Barbara Liskov
- Barbara McClintock
- Barbara Simons
- Beatrice Helen Worsley
- Beatrice Mabel Cave-Browne-Cave
- Beatrice Mintz
- Beatrice Tinsley
- Beatrix Potter
- Bernadine Healy
- Berta Lutz
- Bertha Swirles
- Beryl May Dent
- Beth Levine (physician)
- Beth Shapiro
- Beth Willman
- Betsy Ancker-Johnson
- Betty Holberton
- Beyond Bias and Barriers
- Bibha Chowdhuri
- Birutė Galdikas
- Brigitte Askonas
- Bruria Kaufman

== C ==
- Caitlín R. Kiernan
- Calrice di Durisio
- Camilla Wedgwood
- Cara Santa Maria
- Carla J. Shatz
- Carol A. Barnes
- Carol Karp
- Carol W. Greider
- Carole Goble
- Carole Jordan
- Carole Meredith
- Caroline Herschel
- Carolyn Cohen
- Carolyn Lawrence-Dill
- Carolyn Porco
- Carolyn R. Bertozzi
- Carolyn S. Gordon
- Carolyn Talcott
- Carolyne M. Van Vliet
- Carrie Derick
- Caryn Navy
- Catharine Parr Traill
- Catherine Bréchignac
- Catherine Coleman
- Catherine G. Wolf
- Catherine Hickson
- Cecilia Krieger
- Cecilia Payne-Gaposchkin
- Cecilia R. Aragon
- Celia Grillo Borromeo
- Charlotte Auerbach
- Charlotte Barnum
- Charlotte Froese Fischer
- Charlotte Moore Sitterly
- Charlotte Scott
- Chen Hang
- Chien-Shiung Wu
- Chrisanthi Avgerou
- Christiane Desroches Noblecourt
- Christiane Nüsslein-Volhard
- Christina Miller
- Christina Roccati
- Christine Buisman
- Christine Hamill
- Christine Marie Berkhout
- Claire F. Gmachl
- Claire Fagin
- Claire M. Fraser
- Claire Voisin
- Clara H. Hasse
- Clara Immerwahr
- Clara Southmayd Ludlow
- Claribel Kendall
- Claudia Alexander
- Cleopatra the Alchemist
- Clémence Royer
- Colette Rolland
- Constance Calenda
- Corinna E. Lathan
- Cornelia Clapp
- Cynthia Bathurst
- Cynthia Breazeal
- Cynthia Dwork
- Cynthia E. Rosenzweig
- Cynthia Kenyon
- Cécile DeWitt-Morette

== D ==
- Dana Angluin
- Dana Randall
- Dana Ron
- Dana Ulery
- Danese Cooper
- Daniela Kühn
- Daniela L. Rus
- Danielle Bunten Berry
- Daphne Jackson
- Daphne Koller
- Daphne Osborne
- Darshan Ranganathan
- Dawn Prince-Hughes
- Deborah Charlesworth
- Deborah Estrin
- Dian Fossey
- Diana Baumrind
- Diane Greene
- Diane Griffin
- Diane Pozefsky
- Diane Souvaine
- Dina Lévi-Strauss
- Dominiqua M. Griffin
- Donna Auguste
- Donna Baird
- Doris Mable Cochran
- Dorit Aharonov
- Dorotea Bucca
- Dorothea Bennett
- Dorothea Erxleben
- Dorothea Jameson
- Dorothea Klumpke
- Dorothy E. Denning
- Dorothy Garrod
- Dorothy Hansine Andersen
- Dorothy Hill
- Dorothy Hodgkin
- Dorothy Lewis Bernstein
- Dorothy M. Needham
- Dorothy Maud Wrinch

== E ==
- Edith Bülbring
- Edith Marion Patch
- Edith Pretty
- Edna Grossman
- Elaine Fuchs
- Elaine Weyuker
- Elda Emma Anderson
- Eleanor Anne Ormerod
- Eleanor Glanville
- Eleanor Maguire
- Eli Fischer-Jørgensen
- Elisabeth Altmann-Gottheiner
- Elisabeth Hevelius
- Élisabeth Lutz
- Elisa Molinari
- Elizabeth Ann Nalley
- Elizabeth Blackburn
- Elizabeth Blackwell
- Elizabeth Brown (astronomer)
- Elizabeth Cabot Agassiz
- Elizabeth Carne
- Elizabeth Coleman White
- Elizabeth Fulhame
- Elizabeth Gertrude Britton
- Elizabeth J. Feinler
- Elizabeth Lee Hazen
- Elizabeth Loftus
- Elizabeth Nabel
- Elizabeth Rather
- Elizaveta Karamihailova
- Elizaveta Litvinova
- Ellen Gleditsch
- Ellen Hayes
- Ellen Spertus
- Ellen Swallow Richards
- Ellen Vitetta
- Ellinor Catherine Cunningham van Someren
- Elsa Beata Bunge
- Elsie M. Burrows
- Elsie MacGill
- Elsie Maud Wakefield
- Elsie Widdowson
- Emer Jones
- Émilie du Châtelet
- Emilie Snethlage
- Emma P. Carr
- Emmy Noether
- Enid Mumford
- Erika Pannwitz
- Esther Lederberg
- Esther M. Conwell
- Esther Orozco
- Ethel Browne Harvey
- Ethel Sargant
- Ethel Shakespear
- Etheldred Benett
- Etta Zuber Falconer
- Eugenia Del Pino
- Eugenie Clark
- Eva Bayer-Fluckiger
- Eva Ekeblad
- Eva Nogales
- Evelyn Berezin
- Evelyn Boyd Granville
- Evelyn Fox Keller
- Evelyn Hu
- Éva Tardos
- Evi Nemeth

== F ==
- F. Gwendolen Rees
- FASEB Excellence in Science Award
- Fan Chung
- Faustina Pignatelli
- Flora Wambaugh Patterson
- Florence Bascom
- Florence Nightingale
- Florence R. Sabin
- Florence Wells Slater
- Florence Wambugu
- Florentina Mosora
- Floy Agnes Lee
- Fotini Markopoulou-Kalamara
- Frances A. Rosamond
- Frances Ashcroft
- Frances Cave-Browne-Cave
- Frances E. Allen
- Frances Hardcastle
- Frances Hugle
- Frances Kirwan
- Frances Meehan Latterell
- Frances Theodora Parsons
- Frances Yao
- Francine Berman
- Françoise Barré-Sinoussi
- Frederica Darema

== G ==
- Gabriele Rabel
- Gail Williams
- Garvan–Olin Medal
- Geertruida de Haas-Lorentz
- George and Elizabeth Peckham
- Gerta Keller
- Gertrud Theiler
- Gertrude B. Elion
- Gertrude Bell
- Gertrude Blanch
- Gertrude Caton–Thompson
- Gertrude Mary Cox
- Gertrude Neumark
- Gertrude Scharff Goldhaber
- Gertrude Simmons Burlingham
- Gerty Cori
- Gillian Bates
- Gina G. Turrigiano
- Gisela Richter
- Gisèle Lamoureux
- Gitte Moos Knudsen
- Giuseppa Barbapiccola
- Gladys Amelia Anslow
- Gladys Kalema-Zikusoka
- Glenda Schroeder
- Grace Chisholm Young
- Grace Evelyn Pickford
- Grace Frankland
- Grace Hopper
- Greta Stevenson
- Grete Hermann

== H ==
- Halszka Osmólska
- Hannah Monyer
- Harriet Boyd-Hawes
- Harriet Brooks
- Harriet Mann Miller
- Harriet Margaret Louisa Bolus
- Hava Siegelmann
- Hazel Alden Reason
- Hazel Bishop
- Heather Couper
- Heather Reid
- Hedwig Kohn
- Hedy Lamarr
- Heidi Jo Newberg
- Helen Blair Bartlett
- Helen Dean King
- Helen Flanders Dunbar
- Helen G. Grundman
- Helen Gwynne-Vaughan
- Helen M. Berman
- Helen Megaw
- Helen Murray Free
- Helen Porter
- Helen Quinn
- Helen Ranney
- Helen Sharman
- Helen T. Edwards
- Henrietta Swan Leavitt
- Henriette Avram
- Herrad of Landsberg
- Herta Freitag
- Hertha Marks Ayrton
- Hertha Sponer
- Hertha Wambacher
- Hilda Geiringer
- Hilda Phoebe Hudson
- Hilde Mangold
- Hildegard of Bingen
- Hu Hesheng
- Huguette Delavault
- Hypatia
- Hélène Langevin-Joliot

== I ==
- Ida Henrietta Hyde
- Ida Noddack
- Ileana Streinu
- Inge Lehmann
- Ingrid Daubechies
- Iota Sigma Pi
- Irene Crespin
- Irene Fischer
- Irene Manton
- Irene Uchida
- Irina Beletskaya
- Iris M. Ovshinsky
- Irma Wyman
- Irmgard Flügge-Lotz
- Irène Joliot-Curie
- Isabel Bassett Wasson
- Isabel Briggs Myers
- Isabella Bird
- Isobel Bennett

== J ==
- Jacqueline Felice de Almania
- Jacquetta Hawkes
- Jaime Levy
- Jaime Teevan
- Jan Anderson (scientist)
- Janaki Ammal
- Jane Brotherton Walker
- Jane Colden
- Jane Ellen Harrison
- Jane Goodall
- Jane Hillston
- Jane Lubchenco
- Jane Marcet
- Jane S. Richardson
- Jane Stafford
- Janet Darbyshire
- Janet G. Travell
- Janet Kear
- Janet L. Kolodner
- Janet Rowley
- Janet Thornton
- Janet Vaughan
- Janet Watson
- Janice E. Clements
- Jean Bartik
- Jean Beggs
- Jean Jenkins (ethnomusicologist)
- Jean E. Sammet
- Jeanne Dumée
- Jeanne Ferrante
- Jeanne Villepreux-Power
- Jeanette Scissum
- Jeannette Wing
- Jeehiun Lee
- Jemma Geoghegan
- Jennifer Tour Chayes
- Jennifer Doudna
- Jenny Preece
- Jessica Meir
- Jill Farrant
- Jill Stein
- Jill Tarter
- Jing Li (chemist)
- Joan A. Steitz
- Joan Beauchamp Procter
- Joan Birman
- Joan Dingley
- Joan Hinton
- Joan Roughgarden
- Joan Slonczewski
- Joanna S. Fowler
- Joanne Simpson
- Jocelyn Bell Burnell
- Johanna Mestorf
- Johanna Moore
- Josephine Kablick
- Joy Adamson
- Joyce Currie Little
- Joyce Jacobson Kaufman
- Joyce K. Reynolds
- Joyce Lambert
- Jude Milhon
- Judith Donath
- Judith Estrin
- Judith Goslin Hall
- Judith Q. Longyear
- Judith Resnik
- Judy A. Holdener
- Julia Anna Gardner
- Julia Serano
- Juliet Wege
- June Almeida

== K ==
- Kaisa Sere
- Kalpana Chawla
- Kamal Ranadive
- Kamala Sohonie
- Karen Kavanagh
- Karen Spärck Jones
- Karen Vousden
- Karen Wetterhahn
- Karin Erdmann
- Kate Craig-Wood
- Kate Hutton
- Kateryna Lohvynivna Yushchenko
- Katharine Burr Blodgett
- Katharine Fowler-Billings
- Katharine Way
- Katherine Esau
- Katherine Freese
- Katherine Johnson
- Katherine St. John
- Kathleen Antonelli
- Kathleen Booth
- Kathleen C. Taylor
- Kathleen Haddon
- Kathleen Kenyon
- Kathleen Lonsdale
- Kathleen Maisey Curtis
- Kathleen Taylor (biologist)
- Kathrin Bringmann
- Kathryn Moler
- Kathryn Uhrich
- Katsuko Saruhashi
- Kay Redfield Jamison
- Kiki Sanford
- Kirstine Meyer
- Klara Dan von Neumann
- Klara Kedem
- Krystal Tsosie
- Krystyna Kuperberg
- Käte Fenchel
- Kristine Katherine

== L ==
- L'Oréal-UNESCO Awards for Women in Science
- L'association femmes et mathématiques
- Laura Bassi
- Leah Jamieson
- Lene Hau
- Lenore Blum
- Leona Woods
- Lera Boroditsky
- Leslie Barnett
- Lila Kari
- Lilian Gibbs
- Lillian Dyck
- Lily Young
- Linda Avey
- Linda B. Buck
- Linda Keen
- Lisa Hensley (microbiologist)
- Lisa Kaltenegger
- Lisa M. Diamond
- Lisa Randall
- Lisa Rossbacher
- Lise Meitner
- List of prizes, medals, and awards for women in science
- Liuba Shrira
- Lois Haibt
- Lori McCreary
- Louise Dolan
- Louise Hammarström
- Louise Hay (mathematician)
- Louise Johnson
- Louise Reiss
- Louise du Pierry
- Lucia Galeazzi Galvani
- Lucile Quarry Mann
- Lucy Everest Boole
- Lucy Jones
- Lucy Weston Pickett
- Lucy Wilson (physicist)
- Luisa Ottolini
- Luise Meyer-Schützmeister
- Lydia Kavraki
- Lydia Maria Adams DeWitt
- Lydia Rabinowitsch-Kempner
- Lynn Conway
- Lynn J. Rothschild
- Lynn Margulis
- Lynne Jolitz
- Lanying Lin

== M ==
- M. Christine Zink
- Mae Jemison
- Magda Marquet
- Maja Mataric
- Manuela M. Veloso
- Marcia McNutt
- Marcia Neugebauer
- Margaret Brimble
- Margaret Bryan (philosopher)
- Margaret Burbidge
- Margaret Cavendish, Duchess of Newcastle-upon-Tyne
- Margaret Clement
- Margaret Eliza Maltby
- Margaret Elizabeth Barr-Bigelow
- Margaret Floy Washburn
- Margaret Fountaine
- Margaret H. Wright
- Margaret Hamilton (scientist)
- Margaret Kennard
- Margaret Lindsay Huggins
- Margaret Mead
- Margaret Morse Nice
- Margaret Oakley Dayhoff
- Margaret Ogola
- Margaret Stanley (virologist)
- Margaret Thatcher
- Margrete Heiberg Bose
- Marguerite Perey
- Maria Ardinghelli
- Maria Christina Bruhn
- Maria Chudnovsky
- Maria Cunitz
- Maria Dalle Donne
- Maria Fadiman
- Maria Fitzgerald
- Maria Gaetana Agnesi
- Maria Goeppert-Mayer
- Maria Klawe
- Maria Klenova
- Maria Margarethe Kirch
- Maria Medina Coeli
- Maria Mitchell
- Maria Petraccini
- Maria Reiche
- Maria Sibylla Merian
- Maria Wilman
- Maria Zemankova
- Maria Zuber
- Marian Farquharson
- Marian Koshland
- Marian Stamp Dawkins
- Mariann Bienz
- Marianna Csörnyei
- Marie-Andrée Bertrand
- Marie-Anne Pierrette Paulze
- Marie-Jeanne de Lalande
- Marie Beatrice Schol-Schwarz
- Marie Crous
- Marie Curie
- Marie Le Masson Le Golft
- Marie Stopes
- Marie Tharp
- Marietta Blau
- Marilyn Farquhar
- Marilyn Tremaine
- Marissa Mayer
- Marjolein Kriek
- Marjorie Courtenay-Latimer
- Marjorie Lee Browne
- Marjorie Sweeting
- Marjory Stephenson
- Marta Kwiatkowska
- Martha Burton Woodhead Williamson
- Martha Chase
- Martha P. Haynes
- Marthe Vogt
- Mary-Claire King
- Mary Adela Blagg
- Mary Agnes Chase
- Mary Allen Wilkes
- Mary Anning
- Mary Ball
- Mary Buckland
- Mary Cartwright
- Mary Celine Fasenmyer
- Mary Engle Pennington
- Mary Everest Boole
- Mary F. Lyon
- Mary Gibson Henry
- Mary Higby Schweitzer
- Mary J. Rathbun
- Mary Jane Irwin
- Mary K. Gaillard
- Mary Katharine Brandegee
- Mary Kenneth Keller
- Mary L. Boas
- Mary L. Cleave
- Mary L. Good
- Mary Leakey
- Mary Lee Woods
- Mary Lua Adelia Davis Treat
- Mary Murtfeldt
- Mary P. Dolciani
- Mary Parke
- Mary Peters Fieser
- Mary Shaw (computer scientist)
- Mary Somerville
- Mary Stuart MacDougall
- Mary Tindale
- Mary Vaux Walcott
- Mary W. Gray
- Mary Ward (scientist)
- Mary Watson Whitney
- Mary Whiton Calkins
- Mary the Jewess
- María Elena Galiano
- María de los Ángeles Alvariño González
- Mathilde Krim
- Maud Cunnington
- Maud Menten
- Maureen C. Stone
- Maxine D. Brown
- Maxine Singer
- Maya Paczuski
- Mayana Zatz
- Melba Phillips
- Mercuriade
- Meredith L. Patterson
- Merieme Chadid
- Merit-Ptah
- Merle Greene Robertson
- Michelle Antoine
- Mildred Allen (physicist)
- Mildred Cohn
- Mildred Dresselhaus
- Mileva Marić
- Mina Bissell
- Ming C. Lin
- Miriam Rothschild
- Misha Mahowald
- Molly Holzschlag
- Monica Anderson
- Monica S. Lam
- Monique Adolphe
- Morag Crichton Timbury
- Muriel Wheldale Onslow
- Myra Wilson
- Myriam Sarachik
- Myrtle Bachelder
- Mária Telkes

== N ==
- Nalini Nadkarni
- Nan Laird
- Nancy Adams (botanist)
- Nancy Andrews (biologist)
- Nancy Davis Griffeth
- Nancy Hafkin
- Nancy Hopkins (scientist)
- Nancy Leveson
- Nancy Lynch
- Nancy Wexler
- Naomi Ginsberg
- Naomi Oreskes
- Nettie Stevens
- Nichole Pinkard
- Nicola Pellow
- Nicole-Reine Lepaute
- Nicole King
- Nicole Marthe Le Douarin
- Nina Andreyeva
- Nina Bari
- Nina Byers
- Ninni Kronberg
- Noemie Benczer Koller
- Noreen Murray

== O ==
- Olga Aleksandrovna Ladyzhenskaya
- Olga Holtz
- Olga Lepeshinskaya (biologist)
- Olivia Lum
- Orna Berry
- Ottoline Leyser

== P ==
- Pamela C. Rasmussen
- Pamela J. Bjorkman
- Pamela L. Gay
- Pascale Cossart
- Patricia Adair Gowaty
- Patricia Baird
- Patricia Bath
- Patricia H. Clarke
- Patricia Vickers-Rich
- Patsy O'Connell Sherman
- Pattie Maes
- Paulien Hogeweg
- Pauline Morrow Austin
- Pauline Newman
- Pearl Kendrick
- Persis Drell
- Petronella Johanna de Timmerman
- Philippa Fawcett
- Philippa Marrack
- Phyllis Clinch
- Phyllis Fox
- Phyllis Starkey
- Ping Fu
- Pippa Greenwood
- Polly Matzinger
- Praskovya Uvarova

== R ==
- Rachel Carson
- Rachel Fuller Brown
- Rachel Mamlok-Naaman
- Radia Perlman
- Rama Bansil
- Rebecca Grinter
- Rebecca J. Nelson
- Reihaneh Safavi-Naini
- Renata Kallosh
- Renate Chasman
- Renate Loll
- Renu C. Laskar
- Renée Miller
- Rima Rozen
- Rita Levi-Montalcini
- Rita P. Wright
- Rosa Beddington
- Rosa Smith Eigenmann
- Rosalind Franklin
- Rosalind Picard
- Rosalind Pitt-Rivers
- Rosaly Lopes
- Rosalyn Sussman Yalow
- Rosemary A. Bailey
- Roxana Moslehi
- Ruby Hirose
- Runhild Gammelsæter
- Ruth Aaronson Bari
- Ruth Arnon
- Ruth Benedict
- Ruth F. Allen
- Ruth Hubbard
- Ruth Lawrence
- Ruth Patrick
- Ruth R. Benerito
- Ruth Turner
- Ruzena Bajcsy
- Rózsa Péter

== S ==
- Saba Valadkhan
- Sabina Jeschke
- Sabina Spielrein
- Sallie W. Chisholm
- Sally Floyd
- Sally Ride
- Sally Shlaer
- Salome Gluecksohn-Waelsch
- Sameera Moussa
- Sandra Faber
- Sandra Steingraber
- Sandy Carter
- Sara Billey
- Sara Hestrin-Lerner
- Sara Plummer Lemmon
- Sara Shettleworth
- Sarah Allen (software developer)
- Sarah Flannery
- Sarah Frances Whiting
- Sarit Kraus
- Seema Bhatnagar
- Shafi Goldwasser
- Sharon Glotzer
- Sheena Josselyn
- Sheeri Cabral
- Sheila Greibach
- Sheina Marshall
- Sheri McCoy
- Sherry Gong
- Shirley Ann Jackson
- Shirley M. Tilghman
- Shirley Sherwood
- Shoshana Kamin
- Silvia Arber
- Snježana Kordić
- Sophia Brahe
- Sophia Drossopoulou
- Sophia Jex-Blake
- Sophie Bryant
- Sophie Germain
- Sophie Wilson
- Stefanie Dimmeler
- Stella Atkins
- Stella Cunliffe
- Stella Ross-Craig
- Stephanie Kwolek
- Stephanie Schwabe
- Stormy Peters
- Sue Black (computer scientist)
- Sue Hartley
- Sue Hendrickson
- Sue Whitesides
- Sulamith Goldhaber
- Susan Blackmore
- Susan Dumais
- Susan Gerhart
- Susan Greenfield, Baroness Greenfield
- Susan Hockfield
- Susan Hough
- Susan Howson
- Susan Jane Cunningham
- Susan Kieffer
- Susan L. Graham
- Susan Landau
- Susan Owicki
- Susan R. Wessler
- Susan Solomon
- Susana López Charreton
- Susanne Albers
- Suzanne Cory
- Sylvia Earle
- Sylvia Fedoruk

== T ==
- Tamara Mkheidze
- Tandy Warnow
- Tanya Atwater
- Tara Keck
- Tapputi
- Tasneem Zehra Husain
- Tatyana Afanasyeva
- Tatyana Pavlovna Ehrenfest
- Telle Whitney
- Temple Grandin
- Teresa Maryańska
- Terri Attwood
- Theano (philosopher)
- Thelma Estrin
- Theodora Lisle Prankerd
- Tomoko Ohta
- Toniann Pitassi
- Tracy Caldwell Dyson
- The Trimates
- Trotula
- Tu Youyou

== U ==
- Ursula Cowgill
- Ursula Franklin
- Ursula Martin
- Uta Frith

== V ==
- Val Beral
- Valerie Thomas
- Vasanti N. Bhat-Nayak
- Vera Kublanovskaya
- Vera Popova
- Vera Rubin
- Vera Scarth-Johnson
- Vera Yurasova
- Vi Hart
- Virginia Apgar
- Vyda Ragulskienė

== W ==
- Wanda Orlikowski
- Wanda Zabłocka
- Wang Xiaoyun
- Webe Kadima
- Weizmann Women & Science Award
- Wendy Foden
- Wendy Hall
- Wilhelmina Feemster Jashemski
- Williamina Fleming
- Wilma Olson
- Winifred Asprey

== X ==
- Xie Xide

== Y ==
- Yu-Chie Chen
- Yvette Cauchois
- Yvonne Barr
- Yvonne Choquet-Bruhat

== Z ==
- Zeng Fanyi
- Zoia Ceaușescu
- Zora Neale Hurston

== Trans man scientists who were scientists before transitioning ==
- Ben Barres

== Transmasculine non-binary scientists who were scientists before transitioning ==
- A. W. Peet

== Transfeminine non-binary scientists ==
- Jan J. Eldridge
- Audrey Tang

== See also ==
- List of female Fellows of the Royal Society
- List of female mathematicians
- List of female scientists before the 21st century
- List of women geologists
- Women in chemistry
- Women in computing
- Women in geology
- Women in science
- Women in STEM fields
