= Carolyn Lawrence-Dill =

American plant biologist

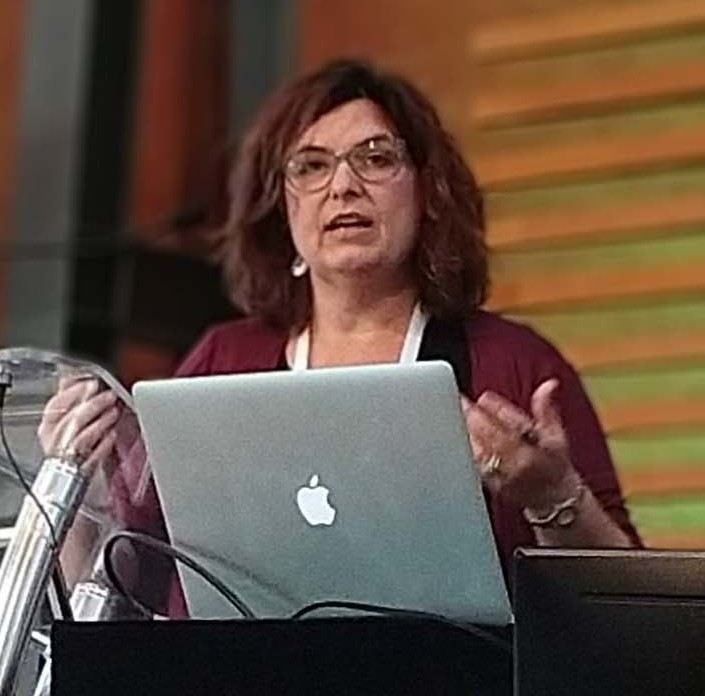
- Born: May 18, 1974 (age 52); El Paso, Texas, U.S.
- Education: University of Georgia; Texas Tech University; Hendrix College
- Known for: Plant science data access and availability; gene function prediction tools and resources; making phenotype descriptions computable, research community-building
- Scientific career
- Fields: Plant Biology; Bioinformatics
- Workplaces: Agricultural Research Service, Iowa State University, Colorado State University
- Doctoral advisor: R. Kelly Dawe & Russell L. Malmberg

Carolyn Joy Lawrence-Dill (born May 18, 1974) is an American plant biologist and academic administrator. She develops computational systems and tools to help plant science researchers use plant genetics and genomics data for basic biology applications that advance plant breeding.

== Early life and education ==
Carolyn Joy Lawrence-Dill, née Cogburn, was born in El Paso, Texas. She grew up in Throckmorton, then moved to Cleburne in 1989. She graduated in 1992 from Cleburne High School. Lawrence-Dill earned a B.A. degree in biology from Hendrix College in 1996. She received her M.S. degree in biology in 1997 from Texas Tech University where she worked on cotton physiology, and her Ph.D. degree in botany in 2003 from the University of Georgia. Her doctoral dissertation focused on integrating traditional and computational methods for inferring gene function in plants.

== Career ==
Following her formal education, Lawrence-Dill served for two years as a postdoctoral researcher under the direction of Volker Brendel at Iowa State University.

In the summer of 2005, Lawrence-Dill began work as a research geneticist for the USDA-ARS. She served as the director of MaizeGDB, the maize model organism database through 2013. In 2014 she joined the faculty of Iowa State University as an associate professor in the Departments of Genetics, Development and Cell Biology and Agronomy. During her time at the institution, she established the Office of Research and Discovery. She was promoted to the rank of professor in 2019. In 2021, she was named Associate Dean for Research and Discovery for the Iowa State University College of Agriculture and Life Sciences and Associate Director of the Iowa Agriculture and Home Economics Experiment Station. In 2024, she joined Colorado State University as Dean of the College of Agricultural Sciences.

== Research ==
Lawrence-Dill's research focuses on mapping genomes and gene elements, predicting protein function, inventing new ways to link genes to phenotypic descriptions and images, developing ways to compute on phenotypic descriptions, organizing broad datasets for community access and use, and developing computational tools that enable others to do all of these sorts of analyses directly. Although research and development projects are across the plant kingdom generally, much of her work focuses on maize.

=== Genomics ===
Lawrence-Dill has advanced plant scientists' ability to access plant genomics resources by sequencing and assembling genomes, annotating structural elements including genes, regulatory elements and CRISPR sites to genomes, and creating tools that enable researchers to analyze gene expression data.

=== Phenomics ===
Lawrence-Dill has advanced plant scientists' ability to compute on phenotype directly via connecting image-based phenotypes to genomics data, crowdsourcing for image-based machine learning, managing information for field and controlled environment high-throughput phenotyping, and computing on phenotypic descriptions.

== Leadership and policy ==
=== Data sharing ===
Much of the work Lawrence-Dill has published seeks to advance data sharing to enable researchers to make use of others' findings, as some scientists harbor concerns about data sharing that those who generate materials and data will not derive prominence from downstream use and benefits derived from their own data. However, generally limiting access to data prevents researchers from being able to test whether research results are reproducible. With respect to genomics data and materials, limiting access to digital sequence information (DSI) relevant to specific germplasm can keep researchers from being able to identify biological materials for novel research applications.

=== Climate and genetic engineering ===
Lawrence-Dill regularly addresses timely topics like climate change and genetic engineering, advising colleagues to engage in discussions on these topics with colleagues in other disciplines, with policymakers, and with the general public. Her guidance focuses on finding shared values, articulating social, environmental, and economic opportunities, and appealing to a better future rather than negative consequences.

In 2016, Lawrence-Dill and sociologist Shawn Dorius began work to better understand where negative public opinions on GMOs originate. While investigating how genetic engineering and biotechnology were portrayed in US media outlets, information on Russian interference in the 2016 United States elections emerged, with English language Russian state news from RT and Sputnik being ordered to register as foreign agents. This led the team to look into news reported by RT and Sputnik, where they found their portrayal of GMO topics to be very different from that of US media. Their research shows that Russian state news about GMOs were almost entirely negative, with seemingly intentional mis-associations linking GMOs with controversial, unrelated, and distasteful topics (e.g., topics on abortions of Zika-infected fetuses and the Trans-Pacific Partnership). The team hypothesized that this activity could aim not only to stir up controversy in the US, but also to serve economic interests in Russia given that agriculture is Russia's second largest industry. They also argue that spreading disinformation can erode public trust in science, which they called "an institutionalized pillar of Western intellectual tradition".

While their findings were under peer review, the Des Moines Register released an article describing their findings on February 25, 2018. The researchers released a preprint of the article via the SocArXiv within a day to ensure that detailed materials, methods, and interpretations of the data were fully available. A media frenzy followed with coverage in more than 80 newspapers, online websites, and radio broadcasts, with audio coverage through National Public Radio's Marketplace (February 28, 2018) and Iowa Public Radio's River to River (March 2, 2018). There was even a political cartoon released by Greg Kearney, and Bill Gates defended GMOs via a Reddit Ask Me Anything discussion in the midst of the coverage. The peer-reviewed publication was accepted on March 11, 2018 and was published on April 30, 2018. Subsequent to media coverage of the GMO-Russia connections, reports of other seemingly unrelated hot topics showed signs of Russian influence with apparent intention to cause discord, with demonstrations of influence campaigns emerging on wide-ranging topics from energy to human rights to international trade.

=== Scientific community building ===
Lawrence-Dill has brought together researchers across many communities to coordinate their work. This includes building consensus for standards and nomenclature, founding community organizations, and encouraging others through mentorship and training opportunities.

== Awards ==
- 2023 Maize Genetics Cooperator Award
- 2020 YWCA Women of Achievement (Ames, Iowa) award for eliminating racism and empowering women
- 2013 Gamma Sigma Delta Induction
- 2009 USDA-ARS Midwest Area Equal Opportunity Award for plant germplasm and genomics outreach to American Indians

== Elected service ==
- 2018 International Plant Phenotyping Network Board (3-year term; co-chair)
- 2018 North American Plant Phenotyping Network Executive Board (2-year term; 2019 chair; founded the 501(c)3)
- 2016 DivSeek International Network Steering Committee, later Board of Directors (member; 4-year term)
- 2010 Maize Genetics Executive Committee (5-year term; 2015 chair)
