= Susan Jane Cunningham =

American mathematician

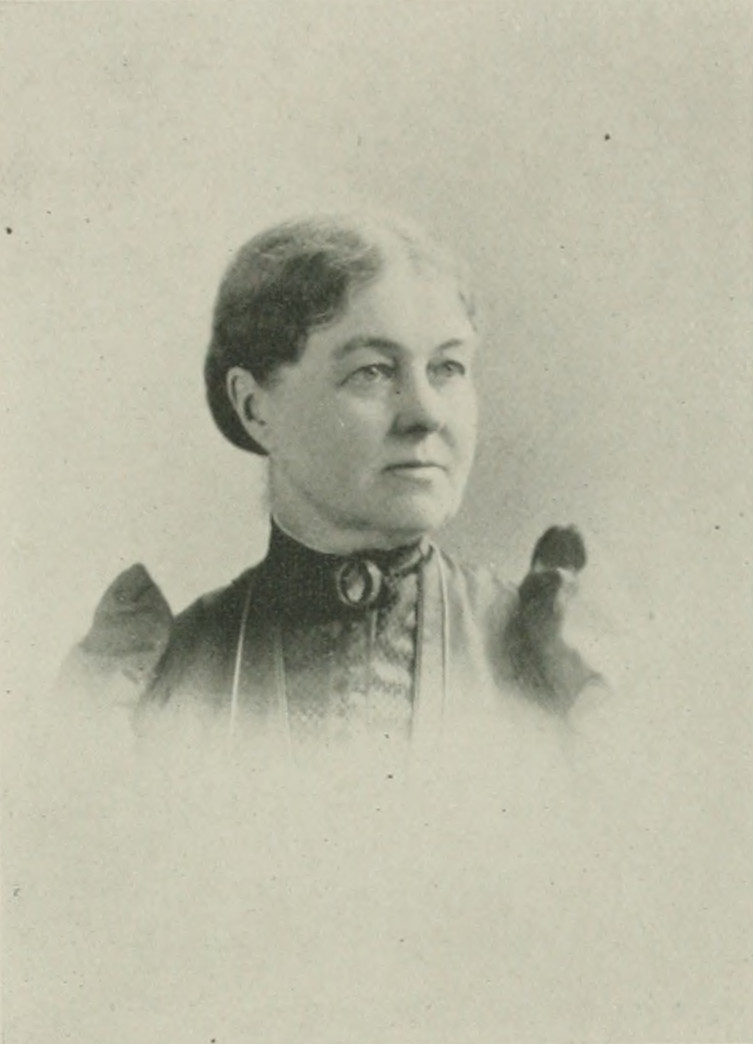
- Susan Jane Cunningham, "A Woman of the Century"
- Born: March 23, 1842; Harford County, Maryland, US
- Died: January 24, 1921 (aged 78)
- Education: Vassar College
- Known for: founding and development of Swarthmore College
- Scientific career
- Fields: Mathematics; Astronomy
- Workplaces: Swarthmore College

Susan Jane Cunningham (March 23, 1842 – January 24, 1921) was an American mathematician instrumental in the founding and development of Swarthmore College. She was born in Maryland, and studied mathematics and astronomy with Maria Mitchell at Vassar College as a special student during 1866–67. She also studied those subjects during several summers at Harvard University, Princeton University, Newnham College, Cambridge, the Royal Observatory, Greenwich, and Williams College.

== Early life and education ==
Mary Jane Cunningham was born in Harford County, Maryland, March 23, 1842. On her mother's side she was of Quaker descent. Her mother died in 1845, and Susan was left to the care of her grandparents.

She attended a Friends' school until she was fifteen years old, when it was decided that she should prepare for the work of teaching. She was sent to a Friends' boarding-school in Montgomery County, Maryland for a year, when family cares required her to return home, and she continued her studies in the school near by.

At nineteen, she became a teacher, and she has taught thereafter, with the exception of two years, one of which she spent in the Friends' school in Leghorne, or Attleboro, and the other in Vassar College. She spent her summer vacations in study. She studied in Harvard College Observatory in the summers of 1874 and 1876, in Princeton observatory in 1881, in Williamstown in 1883 and 1884, under Prof. Truman Henry Safford, and in Cambridge, England, in 1877, in 1878, in 1879 and in 1882, under a private tutor. In 1887, she studied in the Cambridge Observatory, England, and in 1891, she spent the summer in the Greenwich, England, observatory.

== Career ==
In 1869, she became one of the founders of the mathematics and astronomy departments at Swarthmore, and she headed both those divisions until her retirement in 1906. She was Swarthmore's first professor of astronomy, and was professor of mathematics at the college beginning in 1871. By 1888, she was Mathematics Department Chair, and that year she was given permission to plan and equip the first observatory in Swarthmore, which housed the astronomy department, and in which she lived in until her retirement; it was known as Cunningham Observatory. The building still exists on the campus although it is no longer used as an observatory, and is now simply known as the Cunningham Building. In 1888, Cunningham was given the first honorary doctorate of science ever given by Swarthmore. In 1891, she became one of the first six women to join the New York Mathematical Society, which later became the American Mathematical Society. The very first was Charlotte Angas Scott, and the other four were Mary E. Byrd of Smith College, Mary Watson Whitney of Vassar, Ellen Hayes of Wellesley, and Amy Rayson, who taught mathematics and physics at a private school in New York City. Cunningham was also a member of the Astronomical Society of the Pacific as early as 1891. She was also a founder member of the British Astronomical Association in 1890, resigned 1908 September. She was named a Fellow of the American Association for the Advancement of Science in 1901.

== Death ==
Cunningham died on January 24, 1921, from heart failure. Her funeral service was held on-campus in the Swarthmore College Meeting House, and was attended by many notable figures such as then-Pennsylvania governor William C. Sproul and Pennsylvania State Commissioner of Health Edward Martin.
