= Vyda Ragulskienė =

Lithuanian scientist, inventor (1931–2009)

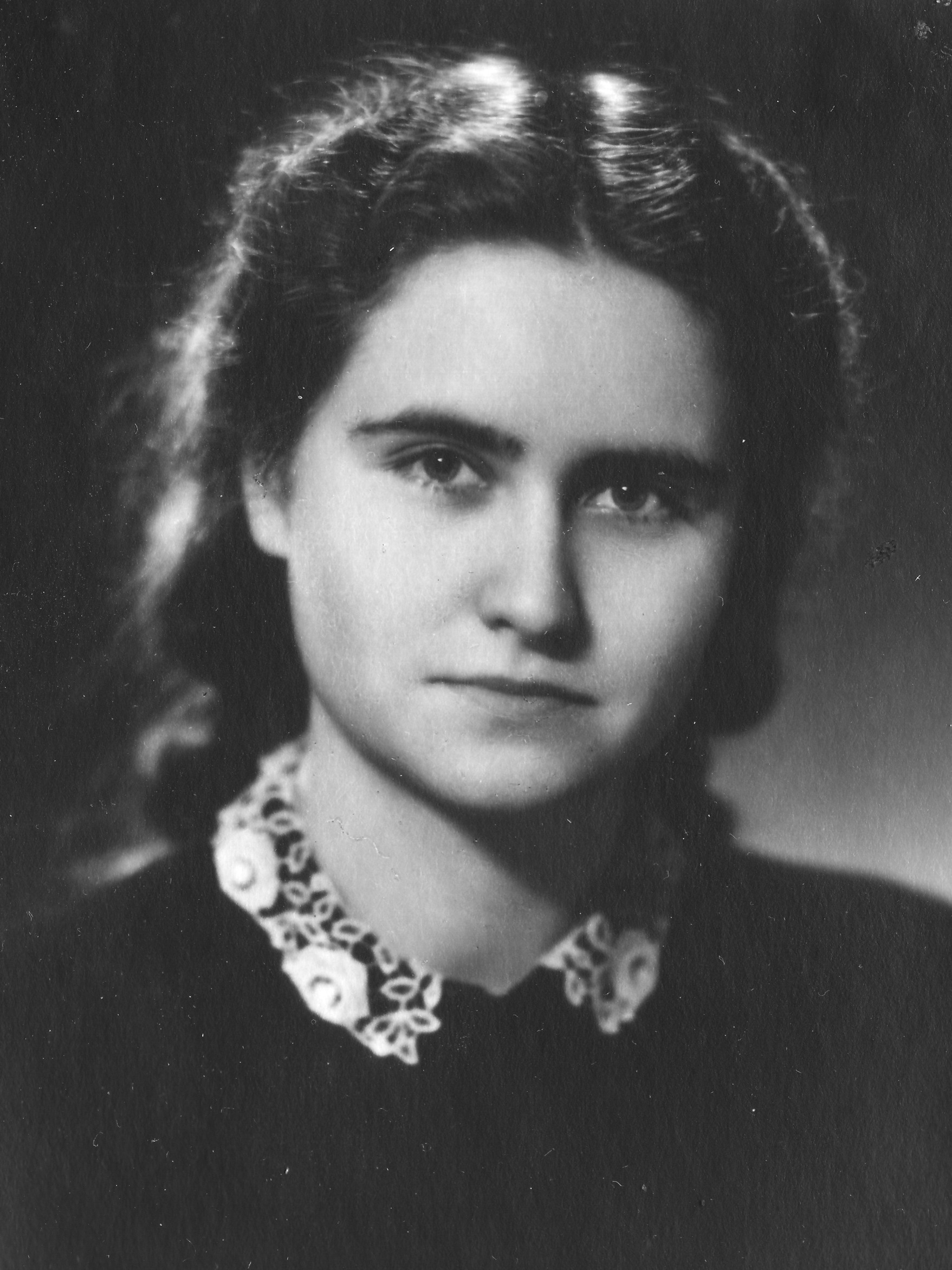
- Born: 4 June 1931; Klaipėda, Lithuania
- Died: 4 January 2009 (aged 77); Kaunas, Lithuania
- Education: Kaunas Polytechnical Institute
- Spouse: Kazimieras Ragulskis
- Scientific career
- Institutions: Lithuanian Academy of Sciences; Kaunas Polytechnical Institute

Professor Vyda Kęsgailaitė-Ragulskienė (4 June 1931 – 4 January 2009) was a Lithuanian scientist, inventor, the first woman to become Dr.habil. of technical sciences in Lithuania.

== Biographical facts ==
Ragulskienė was born in the family of Leonas Kęsgaila-Kenstavičius (1895–1979) and Stefanija Stanevičiūtė-Kęsgailienė (1899–1984) in the village of Dapšiai. In 1955, she graduated with honour from Kaunas Polytechnical Institute. She was a research associate of the Lithuanian Academy of Sciences (1958–1967). From 1967 to 1993 she worked at Kaunas Polytechnical Institute (later Kaunas University of Technology). While studying in the Kaunas Polytechnical Institute, she graduated from Juozas Gruodis Higher Musical School (now it is a conservatory).

She was wife of engineer Kazimieras Ragulskis.

== Scientific achievements ==
In 1965, she defended the dissertation of candidate of technical sciences (doctoral degree). In 1973 she defended the dissertation of doctor of sciences (habilitated doctor), and she received the scientific title of professor in 1977. She coauthored six research monographs, about two hundred research papers and 97 patents. For her research work she was awarded the State Prize of the Lithuanian SSR in 1983. Ragulskienė was a scientific supervisor or consultant of more than fifty defended dissertations.

Her research revealed and explained new phenomena of non-linear vibro-impact systems. She created systems which operate on the basis of new principles. The professor generalized her investigations in research monographs and research papers. The research work of the professor generalizes the results of experimental, analytic and computer studies on the basis of which new theoretical problems and new applications of vibro-impact mechanisms and devices were solved. On the basis of the results of the investigations a number of original devices of vibro-impact type were created which were recognized as inventions.

== General activities ==
Ragulskienė translated from English Samogitia: The Unknown in History by American author of esoteric books and convicted con man Charles Pichel (1890–1982), who falsely claimed to be a French nobleman and signed Charles Louis Thourot Pichel. She was active in the collection of data for the encyclopedia The Officers of the Lithuanian Armed Forces 1918–1953. She also prepared materials about the history of her native village of Dapšiai. Many prominent Lithuanian people hailed from this village, including Kazimieras Simonavičius, the creator of the science of artillery and multi-stage rockets. Her family history reaches Kęsgailos of the 14th century.

== Selected publications ==
1. Voverienė O. Prominent Scientists of Lithuania of the XX Century. Vilnius: Mokslo aidai, 2009, 640 p.
2. Самосинхронизация механических систем / К. Рагульскис, И. Виткус, В. Рагульскене. – Вильнюс: Минтис, 1965. – Т. 1: Самосинхронные и виброударные системы. – 186 с.
3. Ртутные коммутирующие элементы для устройств автоматики / В. - С. С. Зарецкас, В. Л. Рагульскене. – Москва: Энергия, 1971. – (Библиотека по автоматике. Вып. 447) – 104 с.
4. Виброударные системы / В. Л. Рагульскене. – Вильнюс: Минтис, 1974. – 320 с.
5. Двумерные вибрационные приводы / Р. Э. Курило, В. Л. Рагульскене. – Вильнюс: Мокслас, 1986. – 137 с.
6. Контактные системы / В. В. Осташявичюс, Б. В. Рудгальвис, В. Л. Рагульскене, Б. П. Бакшис. – Ленинград: Машиностроение, Ленинградское отделение, 1987. – 279 с.
7. Vibroengineering / One of the authors V. Ragulskienė. – Monograph. Science and Arts of Lithuania. Book 19. Vilnius: Academia Scientiarum Lithuaniae, 1998. – 572 p.
8. Professor Vyda Kęsgailaitė – Ragulskienė (1931 – 2009) / Monograph. Science and Arts of Lithuania. Book 74. Vilnius: Mokslotyros Institutas, 2009. – 568 p.
9. Ch. L. T. Pichel. Žemaitija. Kaunas: Ajeta, 1991. Translated from the English language by V. Ragulskienė.
10. Translation from the English language by V. Ragulskienė: Ch. L. T. Pichel. Žemaitija, nežinoma istorija. Klaipėda: Samogitia Media, 2007.
11. Multi-volume encyclopedia publication „Lietuvos kariuomenės karininkai 1918–1953”. Vilnius, 2001–2009.
12. Šiaudytis V. Lietuvos šviesuoliai. Kaunas: Aušra, 2010, 368 p.
13. Šiaudytis V. Gyvenimas – tai paukščio skrydis prie saulutės arčiau į mėlyną mėlyną dangų... Kaunas: Aušra, 2011, 200 p.
