= A. W. Peet =

New Zealand physicist (born 1968)

- Born: 1968 (age 57–58); New Zealand
- Education: University of Canterbury; Stanford University; University of California, Santa Barbara
- Scientific career
- Fields: Quantum field theory; String theory; Cosmology
- Workplaces: University of Toronto; Princeton University; Perimeter Institute for Theoretical Physics
- Website: ap.io

A. W. Peet (born 1968) is a New Zealand professor of physics at the University of Toronto. Peet's research interests include string theory as a quantum theory of gravity, quantum field theory and applications of string theory to black holes, gauge theories, cosmology, and the correspondence between anti-de Sitter space and conformal field theories (Maldacena duality).

== Early life ==
Peet was born in New Zealand in 1968.

== Career ==
In 1990, Peet received a Bachelor of Science in physics from the University of Canterbury, and a doctorate in physics from Stanford University in 1994. From 1994 to 1997, they worked as a postdoctoral fellow at Princeton University, and as a postdoctoral fellow at the Institute of Theoretical Physics, University of California, Santa Barbara from 1997 to 2000. Since 2000, they have been teaching and conducting research as an established professor at the University of Toronto. Peet is also an affiliate of the Perimeter Institute for Theoretical Physics.

== Personal life ==
Peet is non-binary, uses they/them pronouns, and is a New Zealand citizen with a passport using an unspecified gender. Peet chose to come out publicly to support queer youth in STEM fields.

Peet debated their fellow University of Toronto colleague, clinical psychologist Jordan Peterson, about gender identities, on Canadian public television on several occasions, garnering significant public attention. After the debate, Peet faced online harassment that negatively impacted their mental health.

Peet is disabled and experiences chronic pain.

My primary disability is chronic neuromuscular pain, affecting my neck, shoulders, back, left arm, and left leg. It originates in accident traumas, primarily a bad skiing accident at the end of the 1990s. Almost twenty years after initial diagnosis in a city full of medical expertise, I know that there is no cure for my pain or treatment available worth the risks, so I have had to learn to adapt to it. This has required significant revision of the scope of my physics career ambitions. [...]

I also have experience with three mental health (MH) conditions. I developed (mild) depression and (mild to moderate) anxiety as part of my chronic pain odyssey. Then in my early forties, I developed (moderate) PTSD, from six violent crimes committed against me in my twenties and thirties by seven different perpetrators, one of them a coworker. Nowadays, none of these MH histories tends to significantly disrupt my work over an extended period. But my combined experiences do make me more sensitive to students managing mental health conditions than the average physicist.

— A. W. Peet,

Since Peet's disabilities make them unable to comfortably carry bags and heavy objects using their arms and shoulders, they found alternative ways to use and access their belongings in electronic forms.

Since 2003 I have had to profoundly shift my ways of working in order to adapt to long-term chronic pain disability. For example, I cannot comfortably carry a bag in my arms or on my shoulders, so I had to find alternatives. It took me years to find the right gear to reduce my everyday pain without isolating me from students and colleagues or breaking the budget. I am sharing my adaptation solutions here in the hope that they may help someone else find a quicker, cheaper solution to their own acccessibility [sic] conundrum.

I scan all papers and acquire electronic copies of books, so that I can carry my briefcase on a USB stick (currently a 512GB USB3 Patriot Magnum 2). I began doing this routinely years before cloud services like Dropbox became commonplace. I also stripped down the gear I carry every day to a bare minimum, which I can usually fit in my pockets.

— A. W. Peet, on their website

== Awards ==
- 2003: Radcliffe Institute for Advanced Study Fellowship, Harvard University
- 2002: Alfred P. Sloan Foundation Research Fellowship
- 2002: Ontario Premier's Research Excellence Award
- 2000-2006: Canadian Institute for Advanced Research Scholar, Cosmology and Gravity Program

== Publications ==
- Burrington, BA; Peet, AW (2023). "Fractional conformal descendants and correlators in general 2D S_{N} orbifold CFTs at large N". Journal of High Energy Physics. 2023 (2): 91. arXiv:2211.04633. Bibcode:2023JHEP...02..091B. doi:10.1007/JHEP02(2023)091.
- Burrington, BA; Peet, AW (2023). "Larger twists and higher n-point functions with fractional conformal descendants in S_{N} orbifold CFTs at large N". Journal of High Energy Physics. 2023 (2): 229. arXiv:2212.03993. Bibcode:2023JHEP...02..229B. doi:10.1007/JHEP02(2023)229.
- de Beer, T; Burrington, BA; Jardine, IT; Peet, AW (2019). "The large N limit of OPEs in symmetric orbifold CFTs with N = (4, 4) supersymmetry". Journal of High Energy Physics. 2019 (8): 15. arXiv:1904.07816. Bibcode:2019JHEP...08..015D. doi:10.1007/S13130-019-11019-2.
- Cresswell, JC; Jardine, IT; Peet, AW (2019). "Holographic relations for OPE blocks in excited states". Journal of High Energy Physics. 2019 (3): 58. arXiv:1809.09107. Bibcode:2019JHEP...03..058C. doi:10.1007/JHEP03(2019)058.
- Burrington, BA; Jardine, IT; Peet, AW (2018). "The OPE of bare twist operators in bosonic S_{N} orbifold CFTs at large N". Journal of High Energy Physics. 2018 (8): 202. arXiv:1804.01562. Bibcode:2018JHEP...08..202B. doi:10.1007/JHEP08(2018)202.
- Cresswell, JC; Peet, AW (2017). "Kinematic space for conical defects". Journal of High Energy Physics. 2017 (11): 155. arXiv:1708.09838. Bibcode:2017JHEP...11..155C. doi:10.1007/JHEP11(2017)155.
- Carson, Zaq; Jardine, Ian T; Peet, A. W. (2017), "Component twist method for higher twists in D1-D5 CFT", Physical Review D, 96 (2) 026006, arXiv:1704.03401, Bibcode:2017PhRvD..96b6006C, doi:10.1103/PhysRevD.96.026006, S2CID 119187418
- Burrington, Benjamin A; Jardine, Ian T; Peet, A. W. (2017), "Operator mixing in deformed D1D5 CFT and the OPE on the cover", Journal of High Energy Physics, 2017 (6): 149, arXiv:1703.04744, Bibcode:2017JHEP...06..149B, doi:10.1007/JHEP06(2017)149, S2CID 119263662
- Burrington, Benjamin A; Peet, A. W.; Zadeh, Ida G (2016), "Bosonization, cocycles, and the D1-D5 CFT on the covering surface", Physical Review D, 93 (2) 026004, arXiv:1509.00022, Bibcode:2016PhRvD..93b6004B, doi:10.1103/PhysRevD.93.026004, S2CID 59573940
- Peet, A.W.; O'Keeffe, Daniel (2015), "Perturbatively charged holographic disorder", Physical Review D, 92 (4) 046004, arXiv:1504.03288, Bibcode:2015PhRvD..92d6004O, doi:10.1103/PhysRevD.92.046004, S2CID 118616332
- Burrington, Benjamin A; Mathur, Samir D; Peet, A. W.; Zadeh, Ida G (2015), "Analyzing the squeezed state generated by a twist deformation", Physical Review D, 91 (12) 124072, arXiv:1410.5790, Bibcode:2015PhRvD..91l4072B, doi:10.1103/PhysRevD.91.124072, S2CID 117189788
- O'Keefe, DK; Peet, AW (2014). "Electric hyperscaling violating solutions in Einstein-Maxwell-dilaton gravity with R2 corrections". Physical Review D. 90 (2) 026004. arXiv:1312.2261. doi:10.1103/PHYSREVD.90.026004. S2CID 118873506.
- Burrington, BA; Peet, AW; Zadeh, IG (2013). "Twist-nontwist correlators in MN/S_{N} orbifold CFTs". Physical Review D. 87 (10) 106008. arXiv:1211.6689. doi:10.1103/PHYSREVD.87.106008. S2CID 119252992.
- Burrington, BA; Peet, AW; Zadeh, IG (2013). "Operator mixing for string states in the D1-D5 CFT near the orbifold point". Physical Review D. 87 (10) 106001. arXiv:1211.6699. Bibcode:2013PhRvD..87j6001B. doi:10.1103/PHYSREVD.87.106001. S2CID 119277282.
- Bertoldi, G; Burrington, BA; Peet, AW; Zadeh, IG (2011). "Lifshitz-like black brane thermodynamics in higher dimensions". Physical Review D. 83 (12) 126006. arXiv:1101.1980. Bibcode:2011PhRvD..83l6006B. doi:10.1103/PHYSREVD.83.126006. S2CID 119209307.
- Bertoldi, G; Burrington, BA; Peet, AW (2010). "Thermal behavior of charged dilatonic black branes in AdS and UV completions of Lifshitz-like geometries". Physical Review D. 82 (10) 106013. arXiv:1007.1464. Bibcode:2010PhRvD..82j6013B. doi:10.1103/PHYSREVD.82.106013. S2CID 119266576.
- Bertoldi, G; Burrington, BA; Peet, AW (2009). "Black holes in asymptotically Lifshitz spacetimes with arbitrary critical exponent". Physical Review D. 80 (12) 126003. arXiv:0905.3183. Bibcode:2009PhRvD..80l6003B. doi:10.1103/PHYSREVD.80.126003. S2CID 14521865.
- Bertoldi, G; Burrington, BA; Peet, AW (2009). "Thermodynamics of black branes in asymptotically Lifshitz spacetimes". Physical Review D. 80 (12) 126004. arXiv:0907.4755. Bibcode:2009PhRvD..80l6004B. doi:10.1103/PHYSREVD.80.126004. S2CID 17988492.
- Ford, J; Guisto, S; Peet, AW; Saxena, A (2008). "Reduction without reduction: Adding KK-monopoles to five-dimensional stationary axisymmetric solutions". Classical and Quantum Gravity. 25 (7). arXiv:0708.3823. Bibcode:2008CQGra..25g5014F. doi:10.1088/0264-9381/25/7/075014. S2CID 11674842.
- Page, DC; Peet, AW; Potvin, G (2006). "Generalized hot enhançons". Journal of High Energy Physics. 2006 (10): 024. arXiv:hep-th/0409280. Bibcode:2006JHEP...10..024P. doi:10.1088/1126-6708/2006/10/024.
- Saxena, A; Potvin, G; Guisto, S; Peet, AW (2006). "Smooth geometries with four charges in four dimensions". Journal of High Energy Physics. 2006 (4): 010. arXiv:hep-th/0509214. Bibcode:2006JHEP...04..010S. doi:10.1088/1126-6708/2006/04/010.
- Saremi, O; Kofman, L; Peet, AW (2005). "Folding branes". Physical Review D. 71 (12) 126004. arXiv:hep-th/0409092. Bibcode:2005PhRvD..71l6004S. doi:10.1103/PHYSREVD.71.126004. S2CID 7519853.
- Leblond, F; Peet, AW (2004). "A note on the singularity theorem for supergravity SD-branes". Journal of High Energy Physics. 2004 (4): 022. arXiv:hep-th/0305059. Bibcode:2004JHEP...04..022L. doi:10.1088/1126-6708/2004/04/022.
- Saremi, O; Peet, AW (2004). "Brane-antibrane systems and the thermal life of neutral black holes". Physical Review D. 70 (2) 026008. arXiv:hep-th/0403170. Bibcode:2004PhRvD..70b6008S. doi:10.1103/PHYSREVD.70.026008. S2CID 14110106.
- Dimitriadis, A; Peet, AW; Potvin, G; Ross, SF (2004). "Enhançon solutions: Pushing supergravity to its limits". Physical Review D. 70 (4) 046001. arXiv:hep-th/0311271. Bibcode:2004PhRvD..70d6001D. doi:10.1103/PHYSREVD.70.046001. S2CID 16512363.
- Leblond, F; Peet, AW (2003). "SD-brane gravity fields and rolling tachyons". Journal of High Energy Physics. 2003 (4): 048. arXiv:hep-th/0303035. Bibcode:2003JHEP...04..048L. doi:10.1088/1126-6708/2003/04/048. S2CID 10898560.
- Kruczenski, M; Myers, RC; Peet, AW; Winters, DJ (2002). "Aspects of supertubes". Journal of High Energy Physics. 2002 (5): 017. arXiv:hep-th/0204103. Bibcode:2002JHEP...05..017K. doi:10.1088/1126-6708/2002/05/017. S2CID 16260233.
- Kruczenski, M; Myers, RC; Peet, AW (2002). "Supergravity S-Branes". Journal of High Energy Physics. 2002 (5): 039. arXiv:hep-th/0204144. Bibcode:2002JHEP...05..039K. doi:10.1088/1126-6708/2002/05/039.
- Johnson, CV; Myers, RC; Peet, AW; Ross, SF (2001). "The enhançon and the consistency of excision". Physical Review D. 64 (10) 106001. arXiv:hep-th/0105077. Bibcode:2001PhRvD..64j6001J. doi:10.1103/PHYSREVD.64.106001. S2CID 16209647.
- Buchel, A; Peet, AW; Polchinski, J (2001). "Gauge dual and noncommutative extension of an N=2 supergravity solution". Physical Review D. 63 (4) 044009. arXiv:hep-th/0008076. Bibcode:2001PhRvD..63d4009B. doi:10.1103/PHYSREVD.63.044009. S2CID 17692300.
- Johnson, CV; Peet, AW; Polchinski, J (2000). "Gauge theory and the excision of repulsion singularities". Physical Review D. 61 (8) 086001. arXiv:hep-th/9911161. Bibcode:2000PhRvD..61h6001J. doi:10.1103/PhysRevD.61.086001. S2CID 2454007.
- Peet, AW (2000). "Baldness/delocalization in intersecting brane systems". Classical and Quantum Gravity. 17 (5): 1235–1243. arXiv:hep-th/9910098. Bibcode:2000CQGra..17.1235P. doi:10.1088/0264-9381/17/5/332. S2CID 250755905.
- Marolf, D; Peet, AW (1999). "Brane baldness versus superselection sectors". Physical Review D. 60 (10) 105007. arXiv:hep-th/9903213. Bibcode:1999PhRvD..60j5007M. doi:10.1103/PHYSREVD.60.105007. S2CID 7508615.
- Peet, AW; Polchinski, J (1999). "UV-IR relations in AdS dynamics". Physical Review D. 59 (6) 065011. arXiv:hep-th/9809022. Bibcode:1999PhRvD..59f5011P. doi:10.1103/PHYSREVD.59.065011. S2CID 15531643.
- Peet, AW (1998). "The Bekenstein formula and string theory (N-brane theory)". Classical and Quantum Gravity. 15 (11): 3291–3338. arXiv:hep-th/9712253. doi:10.1088/0264-9381/15/11/003. S2CID 250850487.
- Lee, S; Peet, AW; Thorlacius, L (1998). "Brane waves and strings". Nuclear Physics B. 514 (1–2): 161–176. arXiv:hep-th/9710097. Bibcode:1998NuPhB.514..161L. doi:10.1016/S0550-3213(97)86505-4. S2CID 13899954.
- Peet, AW; Ross, SF (1998). "Microcanonical phases of string theory on AdS_{m}×S^{n}". Journal of High Energy Physics. 1998 (12): 020. arXiv:hep-th/9810200. Bibcode:1998JHEP...12..020P. doi:10.1088/1126-6708/1998/12/020.
- Breckenridge, JC; Myers, RC; Peet, AW; Vafa, C (1997). "D-branes and spinning black holes". Physics Letters B. 391 (1–2): 93–98. arXiv:hep-th/9602065. Bibcode:1997PhLB..391...93B. doi:10.1016/S0370-2693(96)01460-8. S2CID 119099283.
- Callan, CG; Maldacena, JM; Peet, AW (1996). "Extremal black holes as fundamental strings". Nuclear Physics B. 475 (3): 645–676. arXiv:hep-th/9510134. Bibcode:1996NuPhB.475..645C. doi:10.1016/0550-3213(96)00315-X. S2CID 18118039.
- Breckenridge, JC; Lowe, DA; Myers, RC; Peet, AW; Strominger, A; Vafa, C (1996). "Macroscopic and microscopic entropy of near-extremal spinning black holes". Physics Letters B. 381 (4): 423–426. arXiv:hep-th/9603078. Bibcode:1996PhLB..381..423B. doi:10.1016/0370-2693(96)00553-9. S2CID 119398349.
- Gubser, SS; Klebanov, IR; Peet, AW (1996). "Entropy and temperature of black 3-branes". Physical Review D. 54 (6): 3915–3919. arXiv:hep-th/9602135. Bibcode:1996PhRvD..54.3915G. doi:10.1103/PHYSREVD.54.3915. PMID 10021068. S2CID 11397525.
- Peet, AW (1995). "Entropy and supersymmetry of D-dimensional extremal electric black holes versus string states". Nuclear Physics B. 456 (3): 732–752. arXiv:hep-th/9506200. Bibcode:1995NuPhB.456..732P. doi:10.1016/0550-3213(95)00537-2. S2CID 17169833.
- Mezhlumian, A; Peet, AW; Thorlacius, L (1994). "String thermalization at a black hole horizon". Physical Review D. 50 (4): 2725–2730. arXiv:hep-th/9402125. Bibcode:1994PhRvD..50.2725M. doi:10.1103/PHYSREVD.50.2725. PMID 10017905. S2CID 15009288.
- Kallosh, R; Ortín, T; Peet, AW (1993). "Entropy and action of dilaton black holes". Physical Review D. 47 (12): 5400–5407. arXiv:hep-th/9211015. Bibcode:1993PhRvD..47.5400K. doi:10.1103/PHYSREVD.47.5400. PMID 10015563. S2CID 15115761.
- Peet, AW; Susskind, L; Thorlacius, L (1993). "Tachyon hair on two-dimensional black holes". Physical Review D. 48 (6): 2415–2420. arXiv:hep-th/9305030. Bibcode:1993PhRvD..48.2415P. doi:10.1103/PHYSREVD.48.2415. PMID 10016491. S2CID 15185096.
- Kallosh, R; Peet, AW (1992). "Dilaton black holes near the horizon". Physical Review D. 46 (12): R5223–R5227. arXiv:hep-th/9209116. Bibcode:1992PhRvD..46.5223K. doi:10.1103/PHYSREVD.46.R5223. PMID 10014959. S2CID 12581419.
- Peet, AW; Susskind, L; Thorlacius, L (1992). "Information loss and anomalous scattering". Physical Review D. 46 (8): 3435–3443. arXiv:hep-th/9205114. Bibcode:1992PhRvD..46.3435P. doi:10.1103/PHYSREVD.46.3435. PMID 10015288. S2CID 16352761.
- Kallosh, R; Linde, A; Ortín, T; Peet, AW; Van Proeyen, A (1992). "Supersymmetry as a cosmic censor". Physical Review D. 46 (12): 5278–5302. arXiv:hep-th/9205027. Bibcode:1992PhRvD..46.5278K. doi:10.1103/PHYSREVD.46.5278. PMID 10014916. S2CID 15736500.
