= Wanda Zabłocka =

Polish botanist, phytopathologist, mycologist

- Born: Wanda Heitzman; December 20, 1900; Tarnów
- Died: November 30, 1978 (aged 77); Toruń
- Education: Jagiellonian University
- Known for: mycorrhiza; phytopathology; popular science books
- Spouse: Jan Wojciech Zabłocki
- Children: 0
- Scientific career
- Workplaces: Jagiellonian University; Nicolaus Copernicus University
- Thesis: Untersuchungen über die Mykorrhiza bei der Gattung Viola (1925 (PhD) and 1954 (habilitation))
- Doctoral advisor: Władysław Szjnocha

Wanda Zabłocka (December 20, 1900 in Tarnów – November 30, 1978 in Toruń) was a Polish botanist, phytopathologist and mycologist. She was a professor at Nicolaus Copernicus University in Toruń (1954–1970). Zabłocka was the author of mycology and phytopathology works, including mycorrhiza of Viola (1935, 1936). She is also the author of several books about fungi for the general public.

== Career ==
Zabłocka started doctoral studies at the Jagiellonian University, Kraków supervised by Władysław Szjnocha (maybe geologist Władysław Szajnocha) while teaching in the State Gymnasium for Girls for financial support. In 1925 she was awarded her doctorate. She was then employed as a senior assistant in the Department of Botany of the Faculty of Agriculture and supervised laboratory classes. Later, she visited the Institute of Botany and the Natural History Museum in Vienna and the Natural History Museum in Paris to further her research. In the mide-1930s she published on mycorrhizal fungi that formed symbiotic relationships with the plant genus Viola.

During the Second World War, she took an active part in securing and storing the property of the university.

In 1945, she defended her habilitation thesis on her mycorrhizal research and the following year moved to the Nicolaus Copernicus University in Toruń. She was involved in establishing the Department of General Botany and Department of Microbiology. She became Head of the Department of Mycology. She was promoted to professor in 1954. She retired in 1970.

She initiated the Phytopathology Laboratories at the Experimental Centre of Applied Biology in the village of Koniczynka.

Zabłocka specialized in mycology and phytopathology. Her most important research concerned Gasteromycetes, Hypholoma and mycorrhiza. She also made mycology more accessible to the public through publishing the first scientific guide to mushrooms in Polish (Grzyby kapeluszowe Polski, 1949) and a book on parasitic fungi in 1950.

She collected specimens for the university's herbarium. Some remain at the Nicolaus Copernicus University while others have been transferred to the Herbarium of the University of Warsaw.

== Awards ==
Zabłocka was awarded the Medal for Long Service, the Gold Cross of Merit, the Knight's Cross of the Order of Polonia Restituta and the Gold Badge of the Nicolaus Copernicus University.

== Early and personal life ==
Wanda Heitzman was born December 20, 1900, in Tarnów in what was then the Kingdom of Galicia and Lodomeria in the Austro-Hungarian Empire. She attended secondary school in Kraków and in 1918 she passed the school-leaving examination with honours. She then took a one-year horticulture course at the Faculty of Agriculture of the Jagiellonian University in Kraków. She continued her studies and in 1923 graduated in natural science from the Faculty of Philosophy.

In September 1925 she married fellow botanist Jan Wojciech Zabłocki.
