= Helen Blair Barlett =

Geologist and mineralogist

Helen Blair Barlett was an American geologist, best known for her contribution to the design of spark plug insulators. She received her Bachelor of Science degree in 1927 in geology from Ohio Wesleyan University. Following up her degree in geology, she attended Ohio State University granting her a PhD degree in mineralogy in 1931.

== Education ==
Helen Barlett attended Ohio Wesleyan University and graduated with a Bachelor of Science degree in geology in 1927, at the age of 27. Barlett received an AC Spark Plug Division fellowship and went on to attend Ohio State University, where she was a member of multiple prestigious honors societies including Phi Beta Kappa. She graduated in 1931 with a PhD in mineralogy in her early 30s. During her education at Ohio State University, Barlett worked as a petrographer at AC Ceramic Laboratory, where she later worked as a Mineralogist-Geologist following the completion of her doctorate.

== Experience ==
Upon receiving her PhD, she joined the AC Ceramic Research Department as a mineralogist-geologist where she remained until her retirement in 1966. In 1955, Helen was promoted to Ceramic research specialist, and was again promoted to Ceramic research supervisor the following year in 1956. Following her extended work at AC Ceramic Research Department, Barlett was once again promoted to Ceramic research scientist in 1959 securing a top technical position, and becoming the first woman to reach this status within the General Motors organization. Further, Barlett pushed gender boundaries within the transportation industry, attending technical sessions where she was often the only female in attendance. She was a member of the Mineralogical Society of America, as well as a fellow of the American Ceramic Society, being one of the few female members at the time. She was also a member of the American Chemical Society and the American Association for the Advancement of Science.

She took a leave from her position at General Motors Corporation to work on The Manhattan Project, later returning to General Motors and remained there until she retired in 1966. She worked as a senior scientist at the Massachusetts Institute of Technology (MIT) for a special ceramics-related research project. For the MIT project, which was among many under the scope of the Manhattan Project to develop atomic weapons, she developed a nonporous porcelain for the interior construction of the atomic bomb.

== Work ==
Barlett was a geologist who was interested in spark plugs, and contributed greatly to the motor vehicle world. Beginning in the 1930s, Helen Barlett began to make monumental strides for women within the automotive industry, being the first to invent insulating materials for spark plugs using alumina ceramics. When spark plug insulators were first invented, they were made of porcelain (stacked layers of mica) and molded on a potter's wheel, and thus, were prone to break easily. As a result of the high heats created through the combustion reactions and ignition of fuels, the spark plug which resides in the combustion chamber of an automotive vehicle is bound to experience wear from the elements and constant and repetitive heat. It was discovered that leaded petrol left lead deposits on the initial mica insulators, which negatively impacted the efficiency of the vehicles engines when the spark plug and its insulator were left unmaintained.

Noticing this inefficiency in the previous insulators, Dr. Barlett used her previous knowledge in mineralogy and petrology, as well as the knowledge gained through experience working for AC Spark Plug (General Motors), to introduce a ceramic spark plug insulator made of material which would last longer as a result of its higher heat resistance and would require less maintenance overall. By encasing the spark plugs, she had made possible for them to become quite durable. Prior to the design changes, spark plugs would get covered in byproducts spewed by the engine and had to be manually cleaned every 70 to 150 kilometers for the vehicle to function effectively. Alumina insulator material allows plugs to handle high heat and voltage within the spark plug, enabling vehicles to operate in a more clean and, in turn, more efficient manner. Her essential work on spark plugs improved the overall capabilities of motor vehicles. In fact, Helen’s patented alumina spark plug insulators are so effective and efficient that they are still used in many present day automotive vehicles. She has been credited to have discovered that high alumina metals, containing approximately 0.35 percent lithium oxide precipitated zeta alumina, and over the course of her career, gained 7 patents in connection with her work (4 of which regarded the spark plug insulator).

=== “X‐ray and microscopic studies of silicate melts containing ZrO_{2}” (1931) ===
In one of her first publications (November 1931), she examined Silicate melts containing ZrO_{2} using an X‐ray and microscope to find the form of crystallization of the zirconium compounds under different conditions of temperature and composition. The effect of certain fluxes on these compounds was also examined.

=== “Occurrence and properties of crystalline alumina in silicate melts” (1932) ===
In another published study (July 1932), Barnett would describe the occurrences and properties of crystalline alumina in silicate melts. It is said that Corundum, or alpha-A2O3, would generally show a tendency to crystallize in two different forms. The forms being rhombohedron, or basal plates. The form is determined by the composition of the crystalline melts in which crystallization takes place. For example, high-alumina melts that contain little to no silica, the melt would crystallize into rhombohedron. The crystals are nearly equidimensional and are often rounded, rather them being well-developed forms. They are also characterized by inclusions which could be gaseous or glass. As the silica content of a series of melts becomes greater, the tendency for the alumina to crystallize in thin plates will become more marked. Plates will vary according to the type of condition the plates are in, more specifically, heating and cooling. Rapidly cooled melts may be microscopic in size, while large batches, which have been allowed to cool slowly, would measure an inch or more across. All cases have been observed that plates are not only single crystals, but are composed of thin lamellae. The thin lamellae are made up by the parallel grouping of basal plates shortened by a hexagonal prism and elongated parallel to two opposite faces of the prism. It would produce very fine striations on the smooth surface of the plate, which are more or less regularly interrupted by the completion of the prism form.

=== “Effect of organic grinding media on water-soluble silicia frits” (1933) ===
In another publication (1933), Barnett and Schwartzwalder used alcohol and benzene to determine the effect of solubility of different grain sizes. When alcohol was used with the grains, it resulted in a thin mixture. However, this varied. After more testing, Bartlett and Schwartzwalder discovered that alkali was the reason behind the different results in alcohol mixtures due to the addition of hydrochloric acid. When Barlett tested benzene with the grains, it resulted in poor grinding action and it was not effective in finding the effect of solubility on different grain sizes. Barlett and Schwartzwalder conclude in the article that certain organic grinding media such as polar molecules (especially alcohol) can be used to solve the “agglomeration, caking, and scumming” problems associated with partially water-soluble silicate frits.

=== “A study of the mineralogical and physical characteristics of two lithia‐zirconia bodies” (1934) ===
In a later publication (December 1934), she examined two bodies differing in composition by a small percentage of Li_{2}O that were found to show marked differences in physical properties, especially in thermal expansion. Petrographic examinations were made of the electric‐furnace products used as the non-plastics and of the fired porcelain to determine what structural or mineralogical differences might be responsible for these variations. The properties of a feldspar body, tested under similar conditions, are given for comparative purposes.

=== “Rate of decomposition of kyanite at various temperatures” (1940) ===
Helen Barlett conducted an experiment to determine the rate at which kyanite breaks down into mullite and glass, and later published an article on her findings (September 1940). A furnace containing a thermocouple was used and platinum wires were wrapped around fragments of kyanite which were suspended by the furnace. Once heated, the sample was taken out of the furnace and was observed with a microscope to figure out if the kyanite had broken down into mullite and glass. Many trials were performed until the rate of decomposition at a certain temperature was achieved. Helen Barlett discovered that the rate at which North Carolina kyanite of various grain sizes decomposes into mullite and glass is in the temperature range of 1350° to 1600 °C. She also discovered that the decomposition of kyanite into mullite and glass varies on the source, size of kyanite, and temperature.

== Personal life ==
Outside of her professional work, Helen Barlett had an experimental and unconventional interest in golf, often practicing for the summer gold season in Michigan during her vacations. Helen was also a prominent member of Flint’s Zonta International for several years, and as a remarkable female scientist, she was very enthusiastic about the Flint Science Fair. She continued to contribute to the development of mineralogy even after her retirement in 1966, by teaching groups of young students at Campbell College in Buies Creek, North Carolina. Following the passing of Helen Barlett, Campbell College established a memorial, accepting donations in her honour. Further, in her honour a mobile oxygen unit was built for the Whispering Pines area.

== Patents ==
1. Spark Plug Insulator: Taine G. McDougal, Albra H. Fessler, and Helen Blair Barlett, Flint, Mich., assignors to General Motors Corporation, Detroit, Mich., a corporation of Delaware (2,152,655, November 16, 1935)
2. Ceramic Body for Spark Plug Insulators: Taine G. McDougal, Albra H.Fessler, and Helen Blair Barlett, Flint, Mich., assignors to General Motors Corporation, Detroit, Mich., a corporation of Delaware (2,177,943, September 7, 1938)
3. Ceramic Body for Spark Plug Insulators: Taine G. McDougal, Albra H. Fessler and Helen Blair Barlett, Flint, Mich., assignors to General Motors Corporation, Detroit, Mich., a corporation of Delaware (2,214,931, September 7, 1938)
4. Ceramic Body for Spark Plug Insulators: Taine G. McDougal, Albra H. Fessler, and Helen Blair Barlett, Flint, Mich., assignors to General Motors Corporation, Detroit, Mich., a corporation of Delaware (2,232,860, January 7, 1939)
5. Method of Processing Mica: Helen Blair Barlett, Flint, Mich., assignor to General Motors Corporation, Detroit, Mich., a corporation of Delaware (2,344,670, January 29, 1942)
6. Ceramic Composition and Process for making same: Karl Schwartzwalder, Holly, and Helen Blair Barlett, Flint, Mich., assignors to General Motors Corporation, Detroit, Mich., a corporation of Delaware (2,760,875, October 31, 1951)
7. Corrosion-Resistant Coating for Magnesium Die Castings: Helen B. Barlett, Flint, Mich., assignor to General Motors Corporation, Detroit, Mich., a corporation of Delaware (3,378,410, April 26, 1965)

== Publications ==
1. X-Ray and Microscopic Studies of Silicate Melts Containing ZrO21 (November 1931)
2. Occurrence and Properties of Crystalline Alumina in Silicate Melts (July 1932)
3. Effect of Organic Grinding Media on Water-Soluble Silica Frits (September 1933)
4. A study of the Mineralogical and Physical Characteristics of Two Lithia-Zirconia Bodies (December 1934)
5. Rate of Decomposition of Kyanite at Various Temperatures (September 1940)

== Death ==
Helen Blair Barlett died on August 25, 1969, at the age of 67. Following the death of Helen Barlett, Campbell College established a memorial, accepting donations in her honour. Further, in her honour a mobile oxygen unit was built for the Whispering Pines area. Further, her memorial was published through The American Mineralogist (Vol. 56, March–April, 1971), and held by her colleague Karl Schwartzwalder, whom she filed several patents with, at 1151 Terr. Rd., Holly, Mich. 48442. It was discussed in the publication that she made large strides for the inclusion of women within her profession and that her respectable, pleasant and lovable presence will be remembered.
