= Jeehiun Lee =

Organic chemist

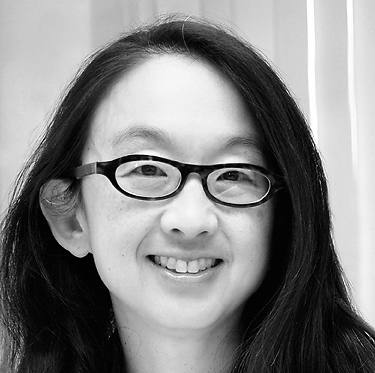
Professor Jeehiun Katherine Lee, Rutgers University

Jeehiun Katherine Lee is an organic chemist and a professor in the department of chemistry at Rutgers University. She currently runs a research lab on the New Brunswick campus.

Although she is an organic chemist by training, she has expanded her research field to biological chemistry, using mass spectrometry, computer modeling and other methods to characterize reactivity and catalysis.

== Research ==
Lee's group combines experimental and computational methods to understand mechanisms of reactions important for chemistry and biology. Specifically, Lee has pioneered the use of traditionally physical methods, primarily mass spectrometry and computational chemistry, to tackle problems at the chemistry/biology interface, focusing on catalysis.

== Education ==
Lee received her BA summa cum laude in Chemistry at Cornell University in 1990. She obtained her PhD in organic chemistry at Harvard University in 1994.

From 1995 to 1997, Lee was a NIH Postdoctoral Research Fellow at UCLA in the lab of Kendall N. Houk.

Lee also teaches classes in organic chemistry for undergraduate students and advanced organic chemistry for graduate students.

== Awards ==
- American Chemical Society PROGRESS/Dreyfus Lectureship Award (Camille and Henry Dreyfus Foundation Special Grant Program in the Chemical Sciences)
- NSF CAREER Award on Mechanistic Studies of Nucleotide Reactivity
- Alfred P. Sloan Fellow
- Faculty of Arts and Sciences Award for Distinguished Contributions to Undergraduate Education
- Sigma Chi Scientific Honor Society
