= Jane Stafford =

American medical writer and chemist

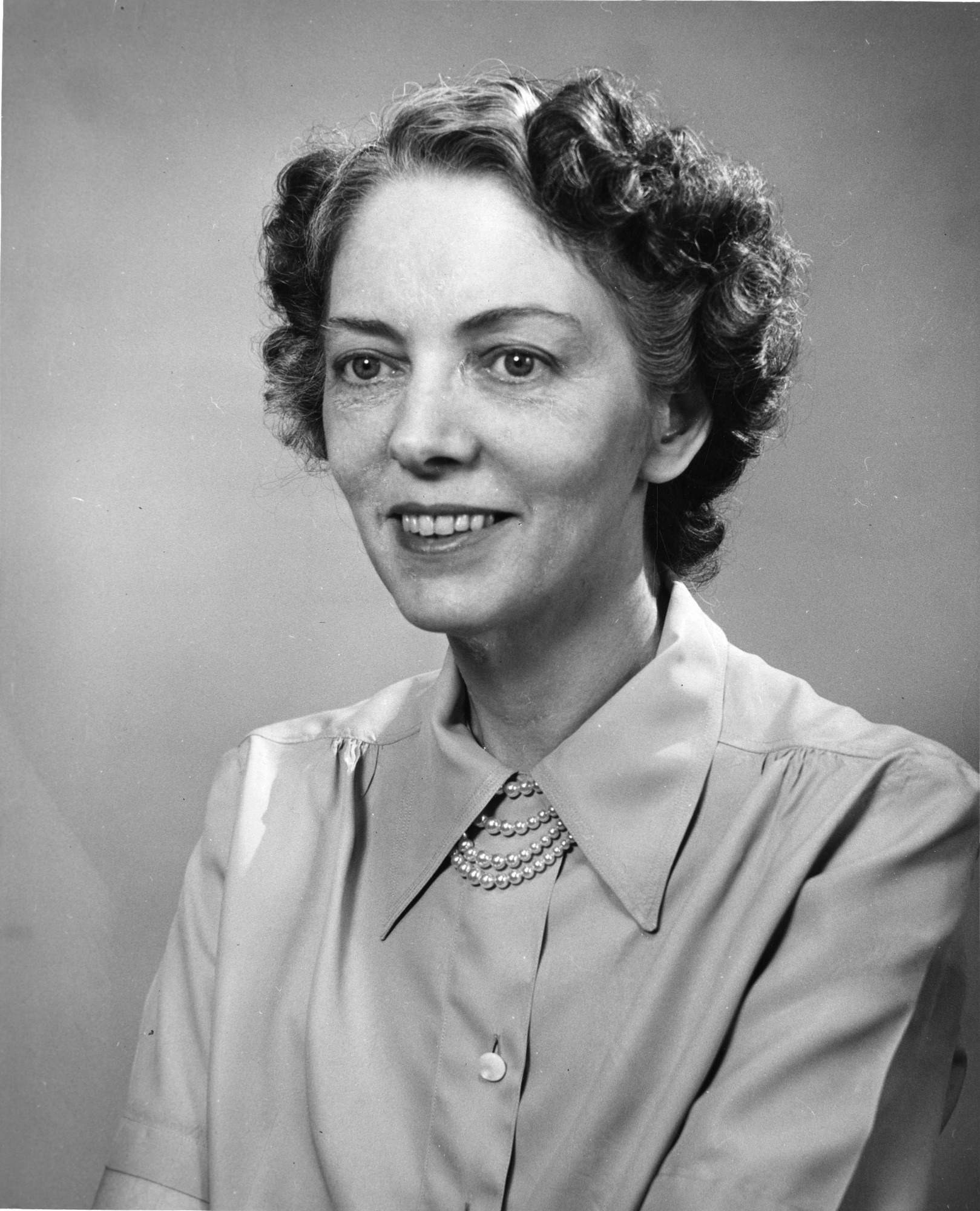
- Jane Stafford
- Born: November 27, 1899; New York City, New York, U.S.
- Died: September 28, 1991 (aged 91); San Francisco, California, U.S.
- Education: Smith College (BA)
- Scientific career
- Fields: chemistry, medicine
- Workplaces: American Medical Association, National Institutes of Health, Science Service

Jane Stafford (1899–1991) was an American medical writer and chemist. She wrote a nationally syndicated newspaper column called "Your Health - Here's How" and worked for Science Service. She wrote about cancer, polio, heart disease, influenza, sexually transmitted disease, and vitamins. She was assistant director of the NIH Office of Information. Stafford co-founded the National Association of Science Writers and served as president of the Women's National Press Club.

== Education and career ==
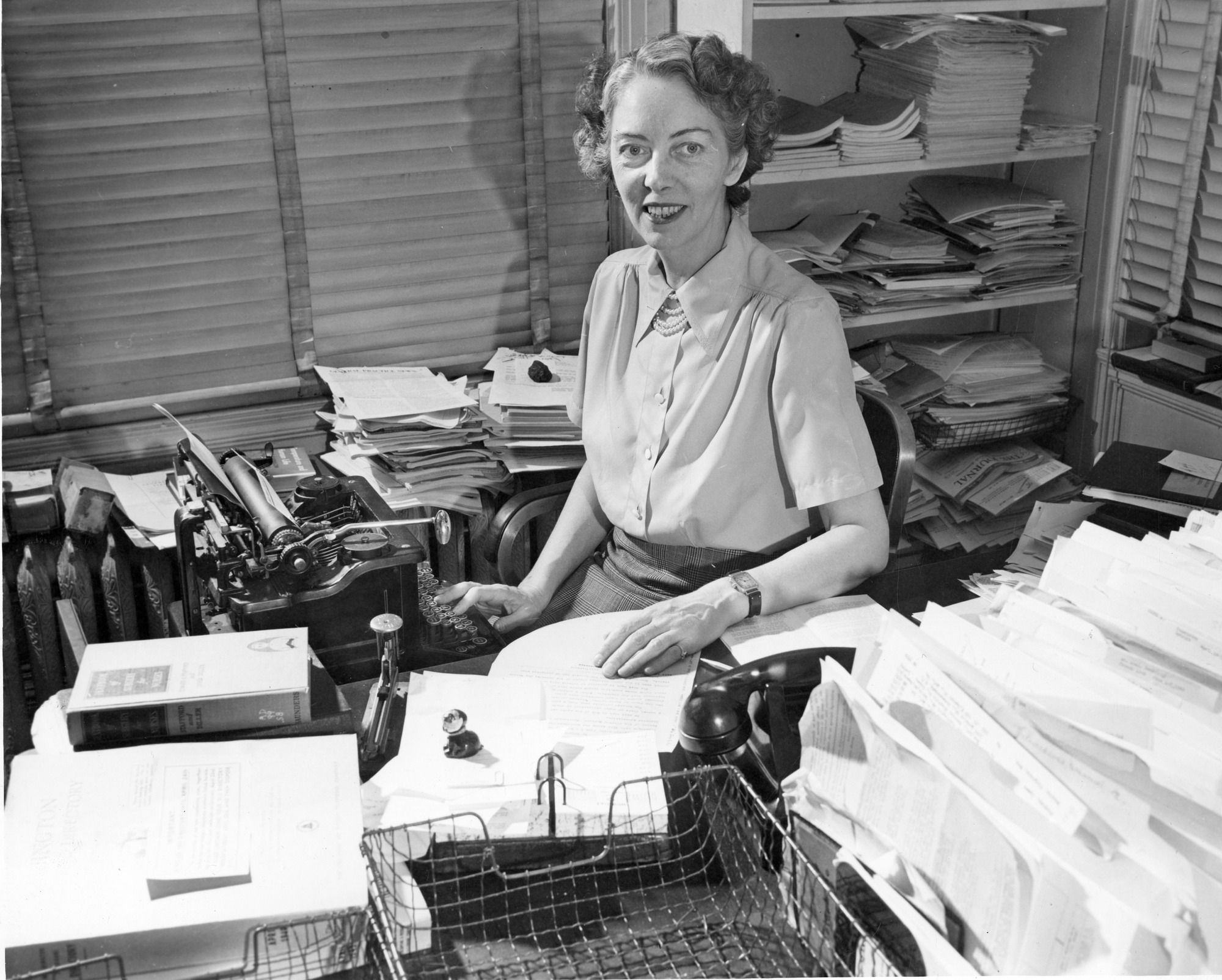
Stafford at the Science Service

Stafford was from Chicago. She graduated from Smith College in 1920 with a B.A. in chemistry. She worked as a chemical technician at Evanston Hospital from 1922 to 1925 before starting at the American Medical Association's Hygeia, predecessor of Today's Health, as an assistant editor, a job she held until 1927. In 1928, Stafford became an employee of Science Service as a medical staff writer and, in 1956, left for the National Institutes of Health (NIH) and served as an assistant for research reports in the NIH's Office of Research Information, "which collected, prepared, and disseminated information related to the medical and biological sciences." Stafford interpreted information from the scientific community for the press and public. She was assistant director of the NIH Office of Information from 1966 to 1971. In 1970, she was acting director for 5 months. Stafford taught other science writers at seminars, such as one in 1965 on the terms and concepts of genetics, a relatively new science then. She also wrote reports for Congress, and edited conference proceedings. She retired on December 31, 1971.

Stafford co-founded the National Association of Science Writers and served as its first female president in 1945; was president of the Women's National Press Club from 1949 to 1950; was a member of the White House Correspondents' Association, American Public Health Association, and the Potomac Hunt Club; served on the Managing Committee for the AAAS-George Westinghouse Science Writing Award; and was an associate of Theta Sigma Phi. Stafford was a member of the American Public Health Association.

== Sexism ==
Although Stafford never explicitly complained of sexist behaviors within the science professions (except for the pay differences), "Science Service records reveal that gender-based barriers were present and that both Stafford and director Watson Davis made some effort to combat them." Social organizations such as the Cosmos Club and the Harvard Club also enforced a men-only policy, barring Stafford from meetings. In response, Independent Woman asked Stafford to author an article focusing on Women in STEM fields; Stafford's resulting article "discussed the small band of pioneers who showed that women could make contributions to science." Stafford also interviewed Mildred Rebstock for an episode of Adventures in Science where Rebstock was encouraged to "comment on science as a career for women and to discuss whether it was compatible with a normal feminine life including marriage, etc.”

== Awards ==
- 1946, Westinghouse Science Writing Award
- 1955, Howard W. Blakeslee Award from the Press Association of the American Heart Association
