= Martha Burton Williamson =

American malacologist and journalist

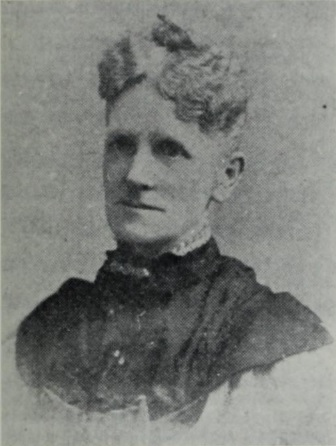
- Born: Martha Burton Woodhead; March 6, 1843; Rothwell, West Yorkshire, UK
- Died: March 18, 1922 (aged 79); Los Angeles, California, US
- Occupations: Malacologist; Journalist

Martha Burton Woodhead Williamson (1843–1922) was an American malacologist and journalist. She was a founding member of the American Association of Conchologists and vice president of the Historical Society of Southern California, as well as the second president of the Southern California Press Club.

Martha Burton Woodhead was born March 6, 1843, in the English town of Rothwell, West Yorkshire, and emigrated with her family to Cincinnati, Ohio, the following year. She was educated in Ohio and later in Iowa, attending Burlington College with an emphasis in philosophy, but never graduated. In 1866 she married Civil War veteran Charles Wesley Williamson, and they had three daughters.

Williamson's journalism career began in 1877, and she was a correspondent for James A. Garfield's 1880 presidential campaign. Her articles appeared in Indiana and Missouri, and in 1882 she became associate editor of the Terre Haute Enterprise in Indiana. She became an active participant in the Woman's Christian Temperance Union. In 1887 (at age 44) she and her family moved to Los Angeles, California and started collecting seashells. It was in Los Angeles that she became active in malacology, the study of mollusks.

She researched the marine family of gastropods, Mitridae, the miters. She proposed 11 new names for mollusks, at least two of which are still valid: Crepidula naticarum and Crepidula norrisiarum.

Williamson maintained a correspondence with William Healey Dall and J. G. Cooper. She is commemorated in the names of the snail Vitrinella williamsoni and the fossil clam Macrocallista williamsoni. Her papers are held in the collection of the Smithsonian Institution Archives.
