= Roxana Moslehi =

Genetic epidemiologist

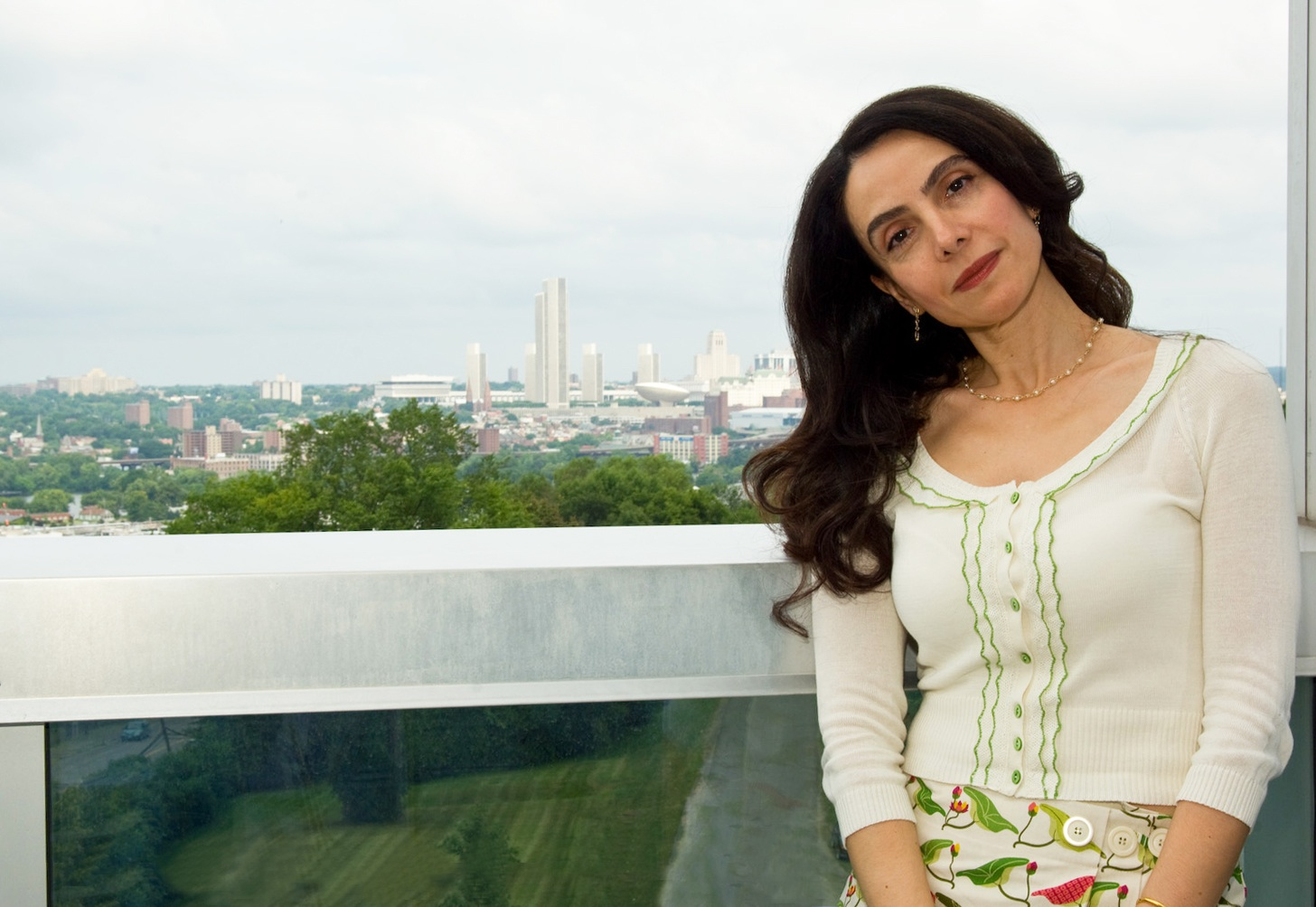
- Moslehi at the east campus of the University at Albany
- Born: Iran

Academic background
- Education: University of British Columbia (BSc, MSc, PhD)
- Academic advisors: J. M. Friedman; Steven Narod

Academic work
- Discipline: Epidemiologist
- Sub-discipline: Genetic epidemiology
- Institutions: University of Albany

Roxana Moslehi (Persian: رکسانا مصلحی) is an Iranian-born genetic epidemiologist.

Her research is on cancer and cancer precursors, including work on radiation-induced cancer of the eyes, genetic and environmental causes of ovarian cancer, and ethnic differences in breast cancer incidence. She also conducts molecular epidemiologic and genomic studies of other diseases such as myalgic encephalomyelitis/chronic fatigue syndrome (ME/CFS) and gestational complications. She is an associate professor in epidemiology and biostatistics in the School of Public Health at the University at Albany.

== Education and career ==
Moslehi received her B.Sc. with honors, M.Sc., and Ph.D. degrees from the University of British Columbia; her 2000 Ph.D. was supervised by J.M. Friedman and Steven Narod. She was a postdoctoral fellow at the National Institutes of Health Division of Cancer Epidemiology and Genetics, under the supervision of Mitchell Gail, and while there she received an adjunct assistant professor position at George Washington University. She is currently an assistant professor at the University of Albany.

== Selected publications ==
1. Moslehi, R.; Kariminejad, M. H.; Ghafari, V.; Narod, S. (2003). "Analysis of BRCA1 and BRCA2 mutations in an Iranian family with hereditary breast and ovarian cancer syndrome". American Journal of Medical Genetics. Part A. 117A (3): 304–305. doi:10.1002/ajmg.a.10031. PMID 12599199. S2CID 27731736.
2. Cass, I.; Baldwin, R. L.; Varkey, T.; Moslehi, R.; Narod, S. A.; Karlan, B. Y. (2003). "Improved survival in women with BRCA-associated ovarian carcinoma". Cancer. 97 (9): 2187–2195. doi:10.1002/cncr.11310. PMID 12712470. S2CID 35351480.
3. Modugno, F.; Moslehi, R.; Ness, R. B.; Nelson, D. B.; Belle, S.; Kant, J. A.; Wheeler, J. E.; Wonderlick, A.; Fishman, D.; Karlan, B.; Risch, H.; Cramer, D. W.; Dube, M. P.; Narod, S. A. (2003). "Reproductive factors and ovarian cancer risk in Jewish BRCA1 and BRCA2 mutation carriers (United States)". Cancer Causes & Control. 14 (5): 439–446. doi:10.1023/a:1024932427503. PMID 12946038. S2CID 40261099.
4. Goldin, L. R.; Camp, N. J.; Keen, K. J.; Martin, L. J.; Moslehi, R.; Ghosh, S.; North, K. E.; Wyszynski, D. F.; Blacker, D. (2003). "Analysis of metabolic syndrome phenotypes in Framingham Heart Study families from Genetic Analysis Workshop 13". Genetic Epidemiology. 25 (Suppl 1): S78-89. doi:10.1002/gepi.10288. PMID 14635173. S2CID 24686039.
5. Moslehi, R.; Goldstein, A. M.; Beerman, M.; Goldin, L.; Bergen, A. W.; Framingham Heart, Study (2003). "A genome-wide linkage scan for body mass index on Framingham Heart Study families". BMC Genetics. 4 (Suppl 1): S97. doi:10.1186/1471-2156-4-S1-S97. PMC 1866538. PMID 14975165.
6. Moslehi, R.; Devesa, S. S.; Schairer, C.; Fraumeni Jr, J. F. (2006). "Rapidly increasing incidence of ocular non-hodgkin lymphoma". Journal of the National Cancer Institute. 98 (13): 936–939. doi:10.1093/jnci/djj248. PMID 16818858.
7. Moslehi, R.; Chatterjee, N.; Church, T. R.; Chen, J.; Yeager, M.; Weissfeld, J.; Hein, D. W.; Hayes, R. B. (2006). "Cigarette smoking, N-acetyltransferase genes and the risk of advanced colorectal adenoma". Pharmacogenomics. 7 (6): 819–829. doi:10.2217/14622416.7.6.819. PMID 16981843.
8. Zhang, L.; Gail, M. H.; Wang, Y. Q.; Brown, L. M.; Pan, K. F.; Ma, J. L.; Amagase, H.; You, W. C.; Moslehi, R. (2006). "A randomized factorial study of the effects of long-term garlic and micronutrient supplementation and of 2-wk antibiotic treatment for Helicobacter pylori infection on serum cholesterol and lipoproteins". The American Journal of Clinical Nutrition. 84 (4): 912–919. doi:10.1093/ajcn/84.4.912. PMID 17023720.
9. Chatterjee, N.; Kalaylioglu, Z.; Moslehi, R.; Peters, U.; Wacholder, S. (2006). "Powerful multilocus tests of genetic association in the presence of gene-gene and gene-environment interactions". American Journal of Human Genetics. 79 (6): 1002–1016. doi:10.1086/509704. PMC 1698705. PMID 17186459.
10. Ahn, J.; Moslehi, R.; Weinstein, S. J.; Snyder, K.; Virtamo, J.; Albanes, D. (2008). "Family history of prostate cancer and prostate cancer risk in the Alpha-Tocopherol, Beta-Carotene Cancer Prevention (ATBC) Study". International Journal of Cancer. 123 (5): 1154–1159. doi:10.1002/ijc.23591. PMID 18546266. S2CID 33072441.
11. Wang, Y.; Zhang, L.; Moslehi, R.; Ma, J.; Pan, K.; Zhou, T.; Liu, W.; Brown, L. M.; Hu, Y.; Pee, D.; Gail, M. H.; You, W. (2009). "Long-term garlic or micronutrient supplementation, but not anti-Helicobacter pylori therapy, increases serum folate or glutathione without affecting serum vitamin B-12 or homocysteine in a rural Chinese population". The Journal of Nutrition. 139 (1): 106–112. doi:10.3945/jn.108.091389. PMC 2646216. PMID 19056661.
12. Kuznetsov, I. B.; McDuffie, M.; Moslehi, R. (2009). "A web server for inferring the human N-acetyltransferase-2 (NAT2) enzymatic phenotype from NAT2 genotype". Bioinformatics. 25 (9): 1185–1186. doi:10.1093/bioinformatics/btp121. PMC 2672629. PMID 19261719.
13. Tan, X. L.; Moslehi, R.; Han, W.; Spivack, S. D. (2009). "Haplotype-tagging single nucleotide polymorphisms in the GSTP1 gene promoter and susceptibility to lung cancer". Cancer Detection and Prevention. 32 (5–6): 403–415. doi:10.1016/j.cdp.2009.02.004. PMC 3730463. PMID 19282111.
14. Moslehi, R.; Singh, R.; Lessner, L.; Friedman, J. M. (2010). "Impact of BRCA mutations on female fertility and offspring sex ratio". American Journal of Human Biology. 22 (2): 201–205. doi:10.1002/ajhb.20978. PMC 3739697. PMID 19642207.
15. Tamura, D.; Merideth, M.; Digiovanna, J. J.; Zhou, X.; Tucker, M. A.; Goldstein, A. M.; Brooks, B. P.; Khan, S. G.; Oh, K. S.; Ueda, T.; Boyle, J.; Moslehi, R.; Kraemer, K. H. (2011). "High-risk pregnancy and neonatal complications in the DNA repair and transcription disorder trichothiodystrophy: Report of 27 affected pregnancies". Prenatal Diagnosis. 31 (11): 1046–1053. doi:10.1002/pd.2829. PMC 3266696. PMID 21800331.
16. Moslehi, R.; Kumar, A.; Mills, J. L.; Ambroggio, X.; Signore, C.; Dzutsev, A. (2012). "Phenotype-specific adverse effects of XPD mutations on human prenatal development implicate impairment of TFIIH-mediated functions in placenta". European Journal of Human Genetics. 20 (6): 626–631. doi:10.1038/ejhg.2011.249. PMC 3355251. PMID 22234153.
17. Chen, L.; Bell, E. M.; Browne, M. L.; Druschel, C. M.; Romitti, P. A.; Schmidt, R. J.; Burns, T. L.; Moslehi, R.; Olney, R. S.; National Birth Defects Prevention Study (2012). "Maternal caffeine consumption and risk of congenital limb deficiencies". Birth Defects Research. Part A, Clinical and Molecular Teratology. 94 (12): 1033–1043. doi:10.1002/bdra.23050. PMC 4457310. PMID 22903936.
18. Zeinomar, N.; Moslehi, R. (2013). "The effectiveness of a community-based breast cancer education intervention in the New York State Capital Region". Journal of Cancer Education. 28 (3): 466–473. doi:10.1007/s13187-013-0488-7. PMC 3776602. PMID 23749424.
19. Moslehi, R.; Schymura, M. J.; Nayak, S.; Coles, F. B. (2011). "Ocular adnexal non-Hodgkin's lymphoma: A review of epidemiology and risk factors". Expert Review of Ophthalmology. 6 (2): 181–193. doi:10.1586/eop.11.15. PMC 3749740. PMID 23976898.
20. Moslehi, R.; Mills, J. L.; Signore, C.; Kumar, A.; Ambroggio, X.; Dzutsev, A. (2013). "Integrative transcriptome analysis reveals dysregulation of canonical cancer molecular pathways in placenta leading to preeclampsia". Scientific Reports. 3: 2407. Bibcode:2013NatSR...3.2407M. doi:10.1038/srep02407. PMC 3757356. PMID 23989136.
21. Moslehi, R.; Coles, F. B.; Schymura, M. J. (2011). "Descriptive epidemiology of ophthalmic and ocular adnexal non-Hodgkin's lymphoma". Expert Review of Ophthalmology. 6 (2): 175–180. doi:10.1586/eop.11.16. PMC 3864672. PMID 24353742.
22. Moslehi, R.; Ambroggio, X.; Nagarajan, V.; Kumar, A.; Dzutsev, A. (2014). "Nucleotide excision repair/Transcription gene defects in the fetus and impaired TFIIH-mediated function in transcription in placenta leading to preeclampsia". BMC Genomics. 15: 373. doi:10.1186/1471-2164-15-373. PMC 4229886. PMID 24885447.
23. Moslehi, R.; Freedman, E.; Zeinomar, N.; Veneroso, C.; Levine, P. H. (2016). "Importance of hereditary and selected environmental risk factors in the etiology of inflammatory breast cancer: A case-comparison study". BMC Cancer. 16: 334. doi:10.1186/s12885-016-2369-z. PMC 4881056. PMID 27229687.
24. Kempin, S.; Finger, P. T.; Gale, R. P.; Rescigno, J.; Rubin, J.; Choi, W.; Fisher, R.; Aizman, A.; Genis, I.; Malamud, S. C.; Moslehi, R. (2018). "A cluster of vitreoretinal lymphoma in New York with possible link to the Chernobyl nuclear disaster". Leukemia & Lymphoma. 59 (8): 1998–2001. doi:10.1080/10428194.2017.1403025. PMC 6082125. PMID 29164983.
25. Moslehi, R.; Zeinomar, N.; Boscoe, F. P. (2018). "Incidence of cutaneous malignant melanoma in Iranian provinces and American states matched on ultraviolet radiation exposure: An ecologic study". Environmental Pollution. 234: 699–706. Bibcode:2018EPoll.234..699M. doi:10.1016/j.envpol.2017.11.099. PMC 5921862. PMID 29241156.
26. Moslehi, R.; Tsao, H. S.; Zeinomar, N.; Stagnar, C.; Fitzpatrick, S.; Dzutsev, A. (2020). "Integrative genomic analysis implicates ERCC6 and its interaction with ERCC8 in susceptibility to breast cancer". Scientific Reports. 10 (1): 21276. Bibcode:2020NatSR..1021276M. doi:10.1038/s41598-020-77037-7. PMC 7718875. PMID 33277540.
27. Moslehi, R.; Stagnar, C.; Srinivasan, S.; Radziszowski, P.; Carpenter, D. O. (2021). "The possible role of arsenic and gene-arsenic interactions in susceptibility to breast cancer: A systematic review". Reviews on Environmental Health. 36 (4): 523–534. Bibcode:2021RvEH...36..523M. doi:10.1515/reveh-2020-0080. PMC 8258236. PMID 34223716.
28. Maloney, B.; Park, S.; Sowizral, M.; Brackett, I.; Moslehi, R.; Chung, W. K.; Gruber, D.; Brower, A.; Lloyd-Puryear, M.; Caggana, M.; Tavakoli, N. P. (2023). "Factors influencing creatine kinase-MM concentrations in newborns and implications for newborn screening for Duchenne muscular dystrophy". Clinical Biochemistry. 118. doi:10.1016/j.clinbiochem.2023.110614. PMID 37479106. S2CID 260044976.
