= Judith Q. Longyear =

American mathematician

- Born: 20 September 1938
- Died: 13 December 1995 (aged 57)
- Education: Ph.D 1972 Mathematics
- Alma mater: Penn State University
- Occupation: Professor
- Known for: Graph Theory / Combinatorics

Judith Querida Longyear (20 September 1938 – 13 December 1995) was an American mathematician and professor whose research interests included graph theory and combinatorics. Longyear was the second woman to ever earn a mathematics Ph.D. from Pennsylvania State University, where she studied under the supervision of Sarvadaman Chowla and wrote the thesis Tactical Configurations. Longyear taught mathematics at several universities including California Institute of Technology, Dartmouth College and Wayne State University. She worked on nested block designs and Hadamard matrices.
