= Nicole King =

American biologist

- Born: 1970 (age 55–56)
- Education: Indiana University Bloomington; Harvard University
- Known for: choanoflagellates
- Awards: MacArthur Fellowship
- Scientific career
- Fields: Biology
- Workplaces: University of California, Berkeley
- Doctoral advisor: Richard Losick

Nicole King (born 1970) is an American biologist and faculty member at the University of California, Berkeley in molecular and cell biology and integrative biology. She was awarded a MacArthur Fellowship in 2005. She has been an investigator with the Howard Hughes Medical Institute (HHMI) since 2013. In 2023 she was elected a Fellow of the American Association for the Advancement of Science.

King studies the evolution of multicellularity and choanoflagellates. The goal of her work is to reconstruct how multicellular animals evolved from single-cell organisms.

== Professional contributions ==
King identified choanoflagellates as key organisms to answer questions about the origin of multicellularity. Prior to her work, it was unclear whether choanoflagellates or fungi were the closest outgroup to multicellular animals (also called "metazoans"). King's comparative genomics work in collaboration with Sean Carroll helped to elucidate the evolutionary "tree of life." In addition, work by King and colleagues showed that choanoflagellates possess several protein-coding genes that are highly related to protein-coding genes in animals at the base of the metazoan tree, such as sponges, cnidarians, and ctenophores.

More recent work by King demonstrates that molecules thought to underpin the transition to multicellarity also exist in choanoflagellates and therefore were present in the single-celled and colonial ancestors of animals. For example, one of the most abundant and important cell adhesion molecules in the animal kingdom, cadherin, exists in choanoflagellates. In animals, cadherins are required to keep cells attached to their neighbors, so it was surprising to discover that cadherins predate the evolution of animals. In addition, King found that choanoflagellates possess genes for molecules such as receptor tyrosine kinase which are used in signaling in animal cells.

King continues her studies on choanoflagellates and multicellularity as an associate professor at the University of California, Berkeley. King received her B.S. from Indiana University Bloomington in 1992, in the lab of Thom Kaufman, working on the fruitfly, Drosophila melanogaster. She did her graduate work at Harvard University (A.M., 1996, and PhD, 1999), studying the spore formation in Bacillus subtilis. After completing a postdoctoral fellowship at the University of Wisconsin–Madison in 2003, she accepted the position of assistant professor of genetics and development at the University of California, Berkeley.

King's lab developed and maintained ChoanoBase, a genetic library of choanoflagellates.

== Awards and recognitions ==
Nicole King received the MacArthur Foundation's "genius" award (2005).

She received the Pew Scholars Program in the Biomedical Sciences (2004).

King also received an honorary Doctor of Science degree from Lehigh University on 18 May 2015, at the commencement ceremony.

In 2022 King was elected to the National Academy of Sciences.

King was elected a 2023 Fellow of the American Association for the Advancement of Science.
