= Lily Young =

Professor of environmental microbiology

- Young, September 2008
- Education: Cornell University; Harvard University
- Occupation: Professor of environmental microbiology
- Scientific career
- Workplaces: Rutgers University–New Brunswick

Lily Young is a distinguished professor of environmental microbiology at Rutgers New Brunswick. She is also a member of the administrative council at Rutgers University. She is the provost of Rutgers New Brunswick. She is a member of the Biotechnology Center for Agriculture and the Environment (Biotech Center) and has her academic appointment in the Department of Environmental Sciences.

For five years, she served as the Associate Dean for Graduate Programs at the School and she is also chair of the Department of Environmental Sciences.

== Education ==
Lily Young obtained her bachelor's degree in microbiology at Cornell University in 1965 and her master's in 1967, also in microbiology. She did her PhD in environmental biology in Ralph Mitchell's lab at Harvard University, where she obtained her degree in 1972.

== Professional career ==
- 1972–1980: Assistant Professor, Environmental Engineering Program, Department of Civil Engineering, Stanford University, Stanford, California.
- 1980–1989: Research Associate Professor, Department of Environmental Medicine and Department of Microbiology, joint appointment, New York University Medical Center.
- 1990–1992: Research Professor, Department of Environmental Medicine and Department of Microbiology, joint appointment, New York University Medical Center.
- 1992– present: Professor, Center for Agricultural Molecular Biology and Department of Environmental Sciences, Cook College, Rutgers University, New Brunswick, NJ.
- 1998–present: Professor II (distinguished), Rutgers Univ.
- 1998–2003: Associate Dean for Graduate Studies (part-time), Cook College, Rutgers University.
- 2001–2008: Chair Department of Environmental Sciences, Rutgers University
- 2009–present: Dean, International Programs, Rutgers University

== Research ==
Young's research focuses on anaerobic microorganisms that degrade harmful organic contaminant chemicals like pesticides and benzene, toluene and xylene (BTX-compounds) from gasoline and other petroleum compounds such as naphthalene, phenanthrene and hexadecane. The microorganisms in the environment are essentially carrying out oxidation and reduction reactions, namely, oxidation of the organic contaminant coupled to the reduction of inorganic electron acceptors. The mechanism by which these bacteria (mainly denitrifiers, iron reducers, sulfidogens and methanogens, respectively) degrade the contaminants is different from aerobic bacteria because they cannot use oxygen to activate the stable hydrocarbon molecules.

In contrast to humans, these bacteria are not dependent on oxygen as an electron acceptor for cellular respiration, but use molecules like nitrate, iron, sulfate and carbonate. During her early research in the Environmental Engineering Program at Stanford University her groups was the first to prove anaerobic oxidation of eleven aromatic lignin derivatives to methane by environmental bacteria.

In 1994, Young's publication on Degradation of toluene and m-xylene and transformation of o-xylene by denitrifying enrichment cultures. (Appl Environ Microbiol 57:450–454) was noted as one of the 10 most highly cited papers in the field of Ecology and Environmental Sciences. At Rutgers, Young has expanded her work to examine the anaerobic communities from NY-NJ Harbor sediments to degrade alkanes and polycyclic aromatic hydrocarbons. A major research goal is to determine the microbial chemistry of the anaerobic pathways of naphthalene, methylnaphthalene and phenanthrene. She was one of the first researchers to use stable isotope labeled compounds to decipher the mechanism of attack of hydrocarbons by anaerobes.

By understanding the anaerobic biodegradation pathways, Young's group has developed methods to improve or enhance natural rates of biodegradation in the environment. This has led to the development of biochemical and biomolecular markers for assessing intrinsic biodegradation occurring in difficult to access groundwater aquifers.

In keeping with her interest in microbial processes in the environment, recent work has also focused on the ability of environmental microorganisms to oxidize or to reduce hazardous metals such as arsenic. Through their ability to change the oxidation state of the metal ions the microorganisms can affect the fate and transport of the metals in aqueous habitats such as streams and groundwater.

== Awards ==
Lily Young has received the following awards:

- 1992: Elected as a Fellow of the American Academy of Microbiology
- 1994: Elected as a Fellow of the American Association for the Advancement of Science (AAAS).
- 2001: Research Excellence Award, Cook College, NJ Agricultural Experiment Station, Rutgers University.
- 2001: Research Excellence Award, Board of Trustees, Rutgers University.
- 2002: American Society for Microbiology National Procter & Gamble Award in Applied and Environmental Microbiology, "Anaerobic processes in the Environment and the Biodegradation of Hydrocarbons and Related Compounds", awards lecture. Highest award in this field.
- 2004: Frank H. Parker Distinguished Lecture, Dept. Civil and Environmental Engineering, Vanderbilt University, Nashville, TN.
- 2015: "Failure to grasp reality" award from her students. After saying tuition was not expensive and it "can't be more than a months work for your parents" when she makes $300,000 a year.

== Personal life ==
Lilly Young is married to Wise Young, a professor in neuroscience at the W.M. Keck Center for neuroscience at Rutgers University. They have two grown children, Talia and Jesse.
