= Colorado State University College of Agricultural Sciences =

Agricultural school of Colorado State University

Coordinates: 40.573314°N 105.080950°W

- Type: Public
- Parent institution: Colorado State University
- Dean: Carolyn Lawrence-Dill
- Location: Nutrien Agricultural Sciences Building, 301 University Ave, Fort Collins, Colorado, United States
- Website: agsci.colostate.edu

The Colorado State University College of Agricultural Sciences includes five academic departments and offers nine undergraduate majors with many concentration options as well as multiple graduate degree programs. People in the College of Agricultural Sciences lead research and design projects in food production, security, and safety, ecosystem health, landscape design, and human well-being. They also provide extension and participate in engagement in agricultural sciences and landscape architecture.

== Academic departments ==
The college is organized into five academic departments:

- Department of Agricultural and Resource Economics
- Department of Agricultural Biology
- Department of Animal Sciences
- Department of Horticulture and Landscape Architecture
- Department of Soil and Crop Sciences

== Undergraduate majors ==
The college offers many concentration options in the following nine majors:

- Agricultural Biology (concentrations in Entomology, Plant Pathology, and Weed Science)
- Agricultural Business (concentrations in Agricultural Economics, Farm and Ranch Management, and Food Systems)
- Agricultural Education (concentrations in Teacher Development and Agricultural Literacy)
- Animal Science
- Environmental Horticulture (concentrations in Landscape Business, Nursery and Landscape Management, Landscape Design and Contracting, and Turf Management)
- Equine Science
- Horticulture (concentrations in Floriculture, Horticultural Science, Horticultural Business Management, Horticultural Therapy, and Horticultural Food Crops)
- Landscape Architecture
- Soil and Crop Sciences (concentrations in Agronomic Production Management, Applied Information Technology, Soil Ecology, Soil Restoration and Conservation, International Soil and Crops Sciences, and Plant Biotechnology, Genetics and Breeding),

Students can also take several online courses offered by the faculty in the College of Agricultural Sciences and can earn undergraduate degrees in agricultural sciences online including programs in:

- Agricultural Business
- Environmental and Natural Resource Economics
- Horticulture

== Graduate programs ==
The college offers Master of Agriculture, Master of Science, and Doctor of Philosophy (Ph.D.) degrees in multiple areas. The graduate degree programs include:

- Agricultural Biology (M.S. and Ph.D), including specializations in Entomology, Plant Pathology, and Weed Science (Formerly Bioagricultural Sciences and Pest Management)
- Agricultural and Resource Economics (M.S.)
- Agricultural Sciences (M.Agr.), including specializations in Integrated Resource Management and Teacher Development
- Animal Sciences (M.S. and Ph.D)
- Extension Education (M.Ext.Ed.)
- Horticulture (M.S. and Ph.D.)
- Horticulture and Human Health (M.S.)
- Pest Management M.S.
- Soil and Crop Sciences (M.S. and Ph.D.)

The Agricultural Sciences degree is also offered as a hybrid in person / online degree, with classes meeting in Denver

Faculty in the College of Agricultural Sciences also train in cross-campus graduate degree programs, including training for M.S. and Ph.D. degrees in:

- Cell and Molecular Biology
- Ecology

A Teaching in Extension graduate certificate is also offered by the college.

Multiple graduate courses are offered online by faculty in the College of Agricultural Sciences. The available certificate programs include:

- Applied Global Stability
- Horticulture and Human Health
- Urban Agriculture

== Professional development programs ==
CSU also offers multiple online professional development programs for people interested in food and agriculture, including:

- Certified Gardener
- Food Manufacturing Safety and Sanitation
- Land Stewardship
- Native Plants in the Landscape
- Spanish for Animal Health and Care Fields
- Understanding Climate Change

== Research ==
Faculty, staff, and students perform research in food safety, human-disease prevention characteristics of food crops, livestock and the environment, renewable energy, no-till cropping systems, risk management for farmers and ranchers, plant adaptation and breeding, plant health, entomology, and organic agriculture. The college is noted for providing opportunities for undergraduate students to conduct research and for developing research projects in cooperation with farmers, food manufacturers, and those working in agricultural technology to improve food security and safety.

The college is home to numerous multi-investigator research programs dedicated to improving food security and safety, ecosystem health, and human well-being, such as the Soil Carbon Solutions Center and the International Weed Genomics Consortium. Research is performed in laboratory facilities in Fort Collins as well as at CSU agricultural experiment stations across Colorado.

== Extension and engagement ==
Faculty, staff, and students in the College of Agricultural Sciences contribute extensively to extension and engagement in agricultural sciences and education. Some notable programs include the Temple Grandin Equine Center, the Colorado Food Systems Program, the Plant Select Program, and the Plant Diagnostic Clinic.
