= Chen Yu-chie =

Taiwanese chemist

- Education: Montana State University, USA (PhD); National Sun Yat-Sen University, Taiwan (MSc); National Cheng Kung University, Taiwan (BSc)
- Scientific career
- Workplaces: National Chiao Tung University, Taiwan; Tzu Chi University, Taiwan
- Thesis: Surface assisted laser desorption ionization (SALDI) mass spectrometry (1997)
- Doctoral advisor: Jan Sunner

Chen Yu-chie (Chinese: 陳月枝; pinyin: Chén Yuèzhī) is a Taiwanese chemist and is a Professor of Chemistry in the National Chiao Tung University, Hsinchu, Taiwan. She received her Ph.D. from Montana State University (United States).

== Research ==
Chen's research interests include biological mass spectrometry, analytical nanotechnology, and nanobiotechnology.

== Achievements ==
Chen is the inventor of Ultrasonication-Assisted Spray Ionization (UASI), as well as Contactless Atmospheric Pressure Ionization (Contactless API), and one of the inventors of the surface-assisted laser desorption/ionization (SALDI) techniques for mass spectrometric analysis of chemical molecules.
