= Florence Wambugu =

Kenyan biologist (born 1953)

Professor Florence Wambūgū
- Born: 23 August 1953 (age 73)
- Citizenship: Kenya
- Education: University of Nairobi; North Dakota State University; University of Bath
- Occupations: Plant pathologist and Virologist Genetic Engineering
- Known for: Genetic Engineering Food crop production and food security in Africa
- Honours: Honorary PhD Doctorate of Science

Florence Mūrìngì Wambūgū (born 23 August 1953) is a Kenyan plant pathologist specialized in virology and genetic engineering. Wambūgū is the founder and Director of Africa Harvest, Kenya. She has used sustainable agricultural solutions through biotechnology to increase food production and combat food insecurity, hunger, malnutrition and poverty in Africa. She was the Africa Regional Director of the International Service for the Acquisition of Agri Biotech Applications(ISAAA), Nairobi. She was the Chief Guest speaker at Kenyatta University's 44th graduation ceremony in 2018. She is a Monsanto USA post-doctoral fellow from 1991-1994.

== Early life ==
Wambūgū was born on 23 August 1953 in Nyeri County, as the sixth-born child in a family of ten, four daughters and six sons. Subsistence farming was part of daily life. From around the age of ten, she worked on the family's sweet potato farm alongside her mother and nine siblings, while her father labored for white settlers elsewhere. The rural upbringing in the foothills of Mount Kenya during the 1950s and 1960s exposed her to persistent food scarcity, with sweet potatoes as the primary staple crop frequently ravaged by blight and pests. She took up to mixing substances to create simple pesticides to protect yields. Her mother supported her amid limited family resources. The experiences highlighted agriculture's centrality to survival and how agricultural failures perpetuated poverty. This inspired her focus towards botany, agronomy, and innovative crop production to address yield gaps and rural vulnerabilities.

== Education ==
After completing her primary education in the village, she enrolled in a boarding school, Kabare Girls High School school 60miles away from her home. Her family and clan with the support of her mother agreed to sell the only cow to send Wambugu to school despite prioritization of her male siblings education. Education of female children was not popular because daughters were culturally expected to be married off rather than investing in their education and development. She was the first woman to attend the University of Nairobi, Kenya, where she received her Bachelor of Science degree in Botany and Zoology in 1978. She obtained her Master of Science in botanical pathology from North Dakota State University, United States in 1984; and earned her PhD in virology from the University of Bath, England in 1991. Her PhD on ‘In vitro and epidemiological studies of sweet potato virus diseases in Kenya’ focused on the control of the sweet potato virus.Her specialization in virology and interest in root or tuber crops, led her to work on sweet potatoes, which later became the first genetically modified crop in sub-saharan Africa.

Wambugu conducted a postdoctoral research at the Monsanto Life Sciences Centre in USA.

She was awarded an Honorary Ph.D, Doctorate of Science, from the University of Bath in United Kingdom in 2009.

== Career ==
Wambūgū established Africa Harvest Biotech Foundation International (AHBFI) in 2002 to boost food production in Africa by providing biotechnological solutions to the crisis of low crop production, hunger, malnutrition and poverty.She is the Chief executive officer and director of the organization. She developed a value chain for Kenyan farmers using five modules: education and information awareness, establishing links between farmers and agronomists while introducing the farmers to new technology, marketing of the farmers’ produce, and linking farmers with existing markets.

Her transformational work in Africa has been featured in a BBC documentary called Jimmy Global Farm.

She was the Africa Regional Director of the International Service for the Acquisition of Agri Biotech Applications(ISAAA) in Nairobi. Wambūgū was a Research Scientist at Kenya Agricultural and Livestock Research Organization (KALRO). From 1978 to 1991 she was a Senior research officer (pathologist) and Coordinator of plant biotechnology research at the Kenya Agricultural Research Institute (KARI), Kenya. Thereafter (1991–1994), she did a post-doctoral research at the Monsanto Life Sciences Centre.

Wambūgū is a leader in public and private partnerships and scientific consortium for the implementation of major projects for crop and tree improvement. For over 30 years, she has focused on agricultural research and contributed to research, development and improvement of maize, pyrethrum, banana, sweet potato and forestry production in Kenya which has significant impact on the livelihoods of small-scale farmers and food production.

She has been board member of Key boards and organizations including; the Private Sector Committee of the CGIAR, the United Nations Millennium Development Goals Hunger Task Force, executive committee member of the Forum for Agricultural Research in Africa (FARA); the DuPont Company Biotech Advisory Panel USA; the International Plant Genetic Resource Institute boad of trustees (IPGRI, now called Bioversity International), and vice chair of the African Biotechnology Stakeholders Forum (ABSF).She is a Council Member of the Science Technology and Society of Japan , a steering committee member of the European Action on Global Life Sciences (EAGLES); and a member of the Science Board of the Grand Challenges in Global Health Initiative by the Bill and Melinda Gates Foundation.

== Genetically modified sweet potato ==
Wambugu participated in courses and seminars on biotechnology in various universities and institutions globally in the 1980s. While working at KARI, she engaged with international scientists from Centre International de la Papa who helped helped her research on Genetically modified sweet potato. She studied trans-genetics in St. Louis, Missouri, supported by Monsanto and Washington University in St. Louis a recipient of the U.S Department of Agriculture grant in 1992.She developed a genetically modified virus-resistant sweet potato. The virus-resistant genetically modified sweet potato is the first genetically modified crop in Sub-Saharan Africa with high yields compared to the regular sweet potato.

== Banana tissue culture ==
Wambugu conducted research on banana tissue culture in conjunction with KARI, Kenya, John Innes Center in United Kingdom, and the Institute for Tropical and Subtropical Crops in South Africa. The project produced safe, disease-resistant and high yielding banana cultures that helped banana farmers in Kenya. Banana and plantains are common foods in Africa, Kenya, Uganda, Tanzania and West Africa.

== Bio-fortified sorghum ==
Africa Harvest in collaboration with UC Berkeley and DuPont Pioneer undertook the Bio-fortified sorghum project to improve the nutritional value and gut digestion of sorghum. While sorghum is a staple grain in many African countries, the project aimed at Kenya, Burkina Faso, South Africa, and Nigeria.

== Biotech criticism ==
Wambugu's work and projects have been criticized by anti-biotechnology green organizations and protestors. She states that anti-biotechnology protesters have not experienced the crisis of famine, malnutrition, starvation and poverty that affects African nations and so their criticism is not fair. Their criticism denies African states and communities the resources needed to develop solutions towards agricultural engineering, agricultural revolution and crop production. She believes that Africa should participate in the biotechnological revolution to produce and contribute and not just a consume, to create solutions to African problems of food insecurity, hunger, poverty, and environmental degradation. She stated that bio-engineering does not threaten traditional and indigenous crop varieties. Rather, biotechnology protects and conserves Africans natural resources biodiversity, also helping in land reclamation through agriculture in lands affected by degradation. In her book, Modifying Africa (2001), Wambugu challenges popular myths and misconceptions about biotechnology in Africa, and the significance of agribiotech to African farmers, communities, and population.

Wambugu, in the Washington Post asserts that, "It is time for Africa to begin thinking and operating as a stakeholder, rather than accepting the ‘victim mentality’ created by opponents of biotechnology. The priority of Africa must be to feed its people and to sustain agricultural production and the environment.”

At the U.S House of representatives Committee, Wambugu stated the need for regulatory policies and institutions in African states to govern and advocate for genetically modified foods safety, adoption, consumption, and awareness.

In February 2004, the science magazine, New Scientist, reported that the project had failed.

== Awards ==
Florence Wambūgū is recipient of various awards:

- Honorary Degree (Doctor of Science), University of Bath 2009.
- Eve Woman of the year Award by the EVE Magazine, in February 2004 in East Africa.
- Woman of the Year 2001 by American Biographical Institute
- First Place Medal Winner, World Bank Global Development Network Awards, KARI (2000) introduction of the tissue-culture banana in Kenya.
- World Bank Global Development Network Award, for the successful introduction of tissue-culture banana in Kenya (2000)
- Africa Food Prize from the Norway-based Yara foundation for her significant contribution to the fight against hunger and poverty in Africa
- Monsanto Company Outstanding Performance Award (1992 and 1993)
- Recognized as an exemplary PhD candidate, Virology Division of Horticultural Research International in England and KARI,1991.
- Farmers Support Award by Pyrethrum Marketing Board of Kenya,1990 for rapid micro-propagation laboratory for pyrethrum in 1986/7
- KARI's Crop Science Award for Outstanding Scientist,1989.
- International Potato Center's (CIP) Regional Research Award/Grant,1989 for the sweet potato project.
- International Institute of Tropical Agriculture (HTA) Award,1981, Nigeria for funding tissue culture laboratory for root and tuber crops.
- International Biographical Centre Lifetime Achievement Award.

== Publications ==
- Bandewar SV, Wambugu F, Richardson E, Lavery JV (13 March 2017). "The role of community engagement in the adoption of new agricultural biotechnologies by farmers: the case of the Africa harvest tissue-culture banana in Kenya". BMC Biotechnology. 17 (1): 28. doi:10.1186/s12896-017-0347-4. PMC 5347829. PMID 28288608.
- Wambugu, F., Che, P. et al (2016). Elevated vitamin E content improves all-trans β-carotene accumulation and stability in biofortified sorghum. Proceedings of the National Academy of Sciences of the United States of America, 113(39), 11040–11045. https://doi.org/10.1073/pnas.1605689113
- Wambugu F, Obukosia S, Gaffney J, Kamanga D, Che P, Albertsen MC, et al. (November 2015). "Is there a place for nutrition-sensitive agriculture?". The Proceedings of the Nutrition Society. 74 (4): 441–448. doi:10.1017/S0029665115000099. PMID 25851095.
- Wambugu, Florence & Kamanga, Daniel. (2014). Biotechnology in Africa: Emergence, Initiatives and Future. DOI:10.1007/978-3-319-04001-1
- Wambugu FM (June 2003). "Development and transfer of genetically modified virus-resistant sweet potato for subsistence farmers in Kenya". Nutrition Reviews. 61 (6 Pt 2): S110–113. doi:10.1301/nr.2003.jun.S110-S113. PMID 12908741.
- Wambugu FM (2001). Modifying Africa: How Biotechnology Can Benefit the Poor and Hungry, a Case Study From Kenya. Nairobi: F.M. Wambugu. ISBN 9966-879-38-2. LCCN 2001311383. OCLC 48559224.
- Wambugu, F. Why Africa needs agricultural biotech. Nature 400, 15–16 (1999). https://doi.org/10.1038/21771
