= Dominiqua M. Griffin =

American health scientist

Dominiqua M. Griffin is an American health scientist at the National Cancer Institute in the Division of Cancer Epidemiology and Genetics as a AAAS Science & Technology Policy Fellow. She is also the founder and CEO of the company Black Women PhDs. Griffin is known for her research focused on school counseling services in the Caribbean, partnerships between school, family, and community, as well as writing policy on mental health and education. She has served as a board member for The Global Center for School Counseling Outcome Research Evaluation and Development and she is an editor for the Journal of Global Engagement and Transformation since 2017.

== Research and career ==
Griffin obtained her B.A. in sociology with a minor in African American Studies from SUNY University at Buffalo and her master's in School Psychology and Counseling Services with a concentration in Counseling and Guidance from Howard University. She did her PhD work with school counselors in Barbados, ultimately obtaining her Ph.D. in Counselor Education and Supervision, with a Dual Title in Comparative and International Education from The Pennsylvania State University. She co-created BlackWomenPhDs, a business that highlights the achievements of Black Women scholars and provides resources for current and future doctors.

In 2021, she was selected to receive the AERA (American Educational Research Association) Congressional Fellowship and is an AERA Ambassador on Capitol Hill in Washington, D.C.

She has contributed to Antiracist Counseling in Schools and Communities and The Wiley Handbook of Family, School, and Community Relationships in Education. She has also been active at Penn State in bringing attention to the lack of faculty diversity.

She has been featured on two podcasts: Nerdacity, 'Why Women Shouldn't Give Up the "Dr." ', and on Cohort Sistas, 'Dr. Dominiqua Griffin of Black Women PhDs on Fostering School, Family, and Community Partnerships in Research, Policy, and Practice'.

=== Awards and honors ===
- 2021–22 American Educational Research Association Congressional Fellow
- 2021 American Educational Research Association Outstanding Dissertation of the Year Award

== Personal life ==
She is from the Bronx and her parents are from both the Caribbean and Florida, USA.
