= Kazimieras Ragulskis =

Lithuanian scientist and engineer (1926–2023)

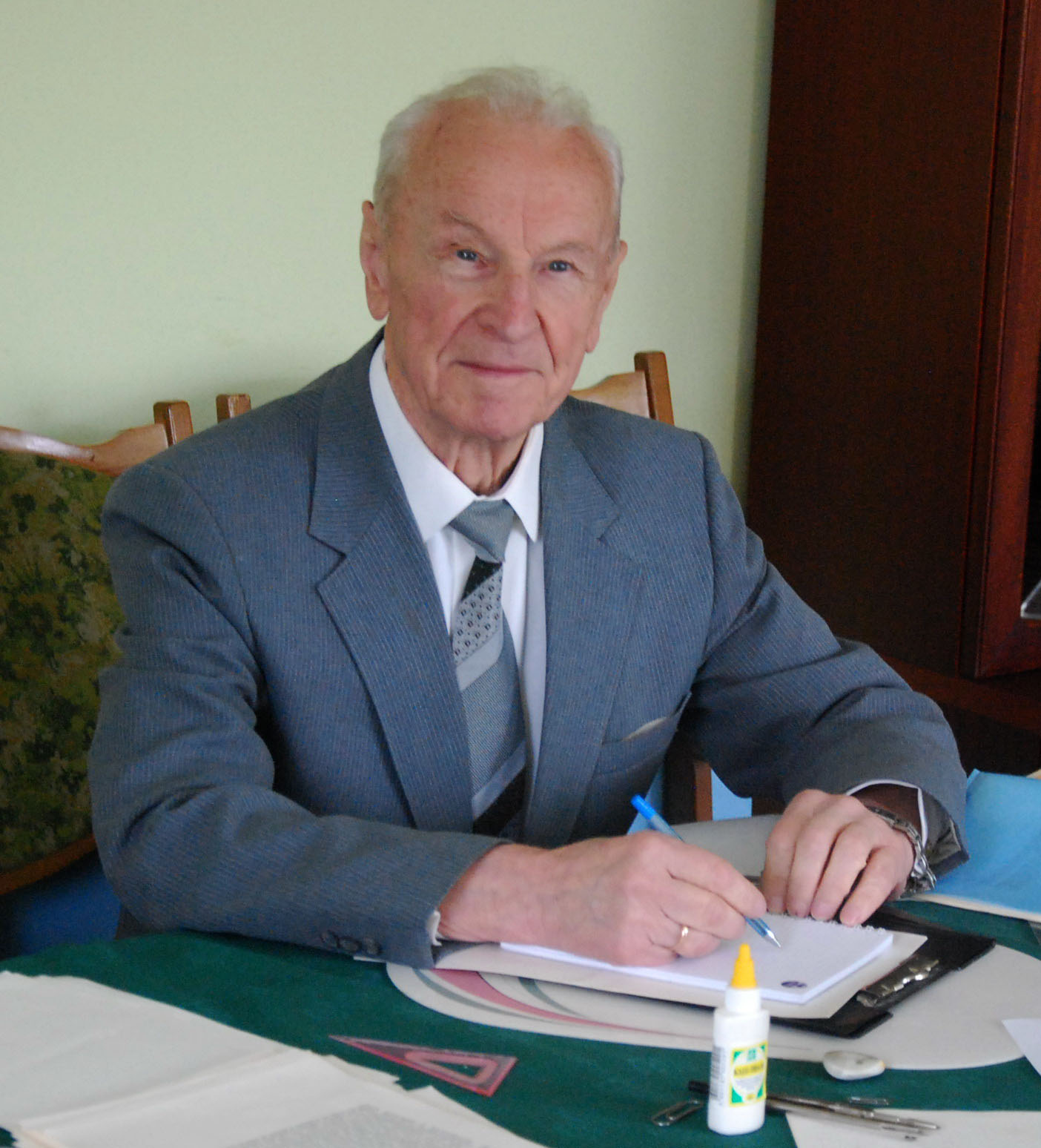

Kazimieras Ragulskis (5 October 1926 – 24 December 2023) was a Lithuanian scientist and engineer. He created the scientific school of precise vibromechanics and vibroengineering. He was Dr. (1954), Habil. Dr. (1963), Professor Emeritus, corresponding member of the Academy of Sciences of the USSR (later of the Russian Academy of Sciences) (1987), member of the Lithuanian Academy of Sciences (1987), Honored Inventor of the USSR (1987).

== Biography ==
Kazimieras Ragulskis was in the family of Mykolas Ragulskis and Liucija Kazlauskaitė-Ragulskienė. He attended the Primary School of Klovainiai (1934–1938), Primary School of Pakruojis (1938–1940), Gymnasium of Linkuva (1940–1946), Kaunas Polytechnical Institute (1946–1951), and postgraduate studies in the Academy of Sciences of the USSR (1952–1954). In 1954–1963 he worked at the Lithuanian Academy of Sciences. From 1963 he worked at the Kaunas Polytechnical Institute where he created Scientific Center Vibrotechnika and was its scientific supervisor.

Ragulskis died on 24 December 2023, at the age of 97.

== Scientific achievements ==
Ragulskis created some new and developed known non-linear effects and qualities. For this purpose he created methods for investigation of essentially non-linear dynamical systems. He created methods based on non-linear phenomena which enable to transform vibrations, waves and energy into continuous motions or motions of desirable type that are one-dimensional or multi-dimensional. He created new methods and means for experimental investigations, basis for creation of systems the operation of which is based on new principles. The created systems ensure high precision of positioning of bodies in space, of performing complicated trajectories and laws of motions and of ensuring the prescribed stable shapes of systems.

Ragulskis with scientists supervised by him and working with him created basis of theory of separate types of mechanical systems, created inventions and patents, innovations and their practical implementations. Original precise devices, manipulators and robots have been created, which found application in various branches of industry and science.

Ragulskis created new scientific domain, the so-called precise vibromechanics and vibroengineering. He created new and developed known effects and qualities of nonlinear dynamical systems, formulated scientific backgrounds of separate directions of this domain, created principles for the creation of new systems, which together with scientists supervised by him developed up to the applied scientific results for engineering practice.

The created the scientific domain of precise vibromechanics and vibroengineering is not of functional character, because it is applicable in all areas (industry, aerospace technology, medicine, biology, art). In this scientific domain the scientific directions of stabilization, robotisation and control were created, which are based on vibrations, waves and nonlinear effects and qualities of dynamical systems.

Ragulskis was the author and co-author of 28 monographs, of 1750 inventions and patents and of hundreds of scientific works. He was Editor in Chief of scientific journal Vibrotechnika (69 issues in the Russian language), of the journal Vibration Engineering and now of the international journals Journal of Vibroengineering and Journal of Measurements in Engineering. He was editor-in-chief of the series of books Library of Vibration Engineering (published in the USSR and the USA) and also of some other publications. He was scientific supervisor or consultant of about 300 defended doctoral and habilitated doctoral dissertations.

== Honours and awards ==
- Honored Inventor of the USSR (1987)
- Merited Worker of Science and Engineering of Lithuania (1970)
- Laureate of the USSR Technology – the Driving Motor of Progress (1982)
- Five times Laureate of the Academician Sergey Vavilov Prizes (1970–1986)
- Three State Prizes of Lithuanian SSR (1967, 1976, 1986)
- Council of Ministers Prize (1981)
- K. Semenavičius Prize (1995)
- Gold Medal of the World Exhibition of Inventions, awarded for inventions by the institutions of Lithuania and the USSR
- 3 Diplomas of Honor, 2 Grand Memorial Medals, 7 Gold Medals, a number of Silver and Bronze Medals of the Exhibition of Economic Achievements of the USSR
- Several prizes of the Lithuanian contest of the best invention of the year Eureka
- Gold and Platinum Medal of the Russian National Academy of Applied Sciences (2006, 2011)
- Diploma of Honor and Medal of the Government of the Republic of Udmurtia (2006)
- Santaka Medal of Kaunas city
- Doctor of Honor of Vilnius Gediminas Technical University (2002) and of Khmelnytskyi National University (2006)

== Sources ==
1. V. V. Klyuev. Precise Vibromechanics and Vibroengineering. Scientific School of K. M. Ragulskis. Moscow: Spektr, 2012. – 192 p. (in Russian).
2. Academician Kazimieras Ragulskis and his Scientific School. Science and Arts of Lithuania, Book 60. Vilnius: Lithuanian Academy of Sciences, 2006. – 728 p. (in Lithuanian).
3. Professor Vyda Kęsgailaitė – Ragulskienė (1931–2009). Science and Arts of Lithuania. Book 74. Vilnius: Science Research Institute, 2009. – 568 p. (in Lithuanian).
4. Ragulskis K. Vibrotechnika 50. Kaunas, Vibroengineering, 2013, 204 p. (in Lithuanian).
5. Ragulskis K., Rondomanskas M., Bubulis A. Vibrations in Science, Engineering and Progress of Mankind. Kaunas, Vibroengineering, 2014, 88 p. (in Lithuanian).
