= Ellen Hayes =

American mathematician and astronomer (1851–1930)

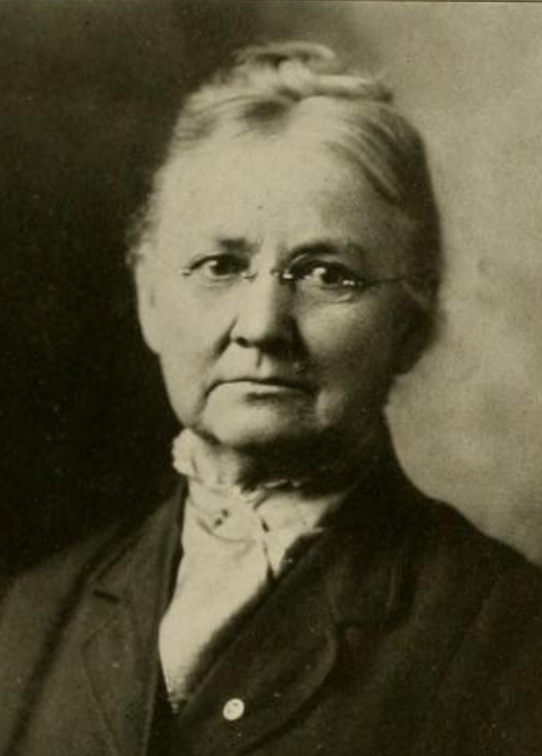
- Ellen Amanda Hayes, from a 1915 publication
- Born: September 23, 1851; Granville, Ohio, US
- Died: October 27, 1930 (aged 79); Wellesley, Massachusetts, US
- Education: Oberlin College
- Scientific career
- Fields: Mathematics; Astronomy
- Workplaces: Adrian College; Wellesley College; University of Virginia

Ellen Amanda Hayes (September 23, 1851 – October 27, 1930) was an American mathematician and astronomer. She was a controversial figure, both for being a female college professor and for embracing many radical causes.

== Early life ==
Hayes was born in Granville, Ohio, on September 23, 1851. She was the first of six children to Ruth Rebecca (née Wolcott) Hayes and Charles Coleman Hayes. At the age of seven she studied at the Centerville school, a one-room ungraded public school and, in 1867, at sixteen, was employed to teach at a country school. In 1872, she entered the preparatory department at Oberlin College and was admitted as a freshman in 1875, where her main studies were mathematics and science.

== Works ==
Hayes conducted significant research in mathematical astronomy, including the calculation of the orbital elements of the newly discovered asteroid 267 Tirza, completed during her studies at the Leander McCormick Observatory at the University of Virginia. Orbit determination in the late nineteenth century required extensive manual computation and advanced mathematical training, making such work notable at a time when women rarely had access to advanced scientific institutions.

In addition to her astronomical work, Hayes authored several mathematical textbooks and instructional materials used in collegiate education. Her teaching career at Wellesley College spanned several decades, during which she contributed to the development of mathematical curricula for women in higher education.

Hayes emphasized rigorous mathematical instruction and supported expanded academic opportunities for women in scientific fields. Her career represents an early example of sustained female participation in professional mathematics in the United States.

As a mathematics professor, she was described as controversial. She questioned the truth of the Bible in front of students. She had very high standards of education, giving more than half of her students D grades during the first year she taught from her trigonometry book. Despite her rigorous teaching style, she had a loyal following of students.

In 1888, Hayes wrote a regular column for the Wellesley College newspaper discussing women's suffrage and dress reform, and in the 1890s she founded a chapter of the temperance movement.

In 1891, Hayes was elected one of the first six women to become members of the New York Mathematical Society (later the American Mathematical Society), founded only three years earlier in 1888. She was named a Fellow of the American Association for the Advancement of Science in 1905.

A history of Wellesley College reads:

A dauntless radical all her days, in the eighties she was wearing short skirts; in the nineties she was a staunch advocate of Woman's Suffrage; in the first two decades of the twentieth century, an ardent Socialist. After her retirement, and until her death in 1930, she was actively connected with an experiment in adult education for working girls. Fearless, devoted, intransigent, fanatical, if you like, and at times a thorn in the flesh of the trustees, who withheld the title of Emeritus on her retirement, she is remembered with enthusiasm and affection by many of her students.

— History of Wellesley College,

== Women in math ==
Hayes was concerned about under-representation of women in mathematics and science and argued that this was due to social pressure, emphasis on female appearances, lack of employment opportunities for women in mathematics and science fields, and schools that allowed female students to opt out of mathematics and science courses.

== Social causes ==
Hayes was a controversial figure not just for being one of the rare women among mathematics professors in nineteenth-century America, but for her questioning the Bible and gender-related clothing conventions and for her embrace of radical causes such as women's suffrage, temperance, socialism, the 1912 Lawrence Textile Strike, and Sacco and Vanzetti case.

She was the Socialist Party candidate for Massachusetts Secretary of State in 1912, the first woman in state history to run for statewide office. She did not win the race, but did receive more votes than any Socialist candidate on the ballot, including 2500 more than for their gubernatorial candidate. During the Russian Revolution, despite anti-Red sentiment, she raised money for Russian orphans and defended socialism. At the age of 76, she was arrested for marching in protest of the execution of Nicola Sacco and Bartolomeo Vanzetti.

== Later life ==
Hayes wrote Wild Turkeys and Tallow Candles (1920), an account of life in Granville, "How Do You Know? A Handbook of Evidence and Inference" (1923) and The Sycamore Trail (1929), a historical novel.

In 1929, she moved to West Park, New York, to teach at Vineyard Shore School for women workers in industry, despite her pain from arthritis. She died on October 27, 1930. Her will left her brain to the Wilder Brain Collection at Cornell University. Her ashes were buried in Granville, Ohio.
