= Aisling Judge =

Irish scientist (born 1991)

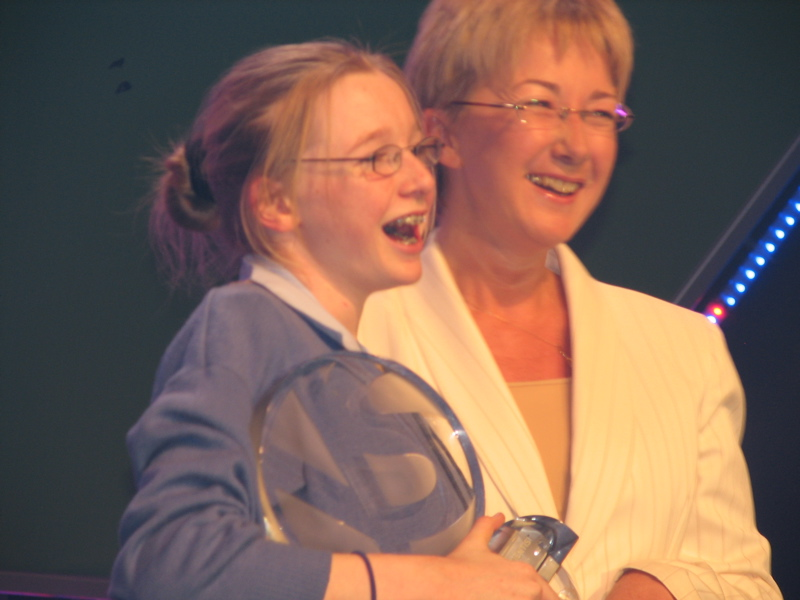
- Judge (left) with Mary Hanafin.
- Born: 1991 (age 33–34)
- Known for: Her device for bad packaged food
- Awards: BT Young Scientist of the Year (2006); 3rd Place EU Young Scientist of the Year (2006)

Aisling Judge is an Irish scientist from Kinsale, County Cork. She was the winner of the 42nd Young Scientist and Technology Exhibition in 2006 at the age of 13. She was the youngest winner in the history of the competition, until her record was taken two years later by thirteen-year-old Emer Jones from Tralee in County Kerry. Judge later finished in third place at the 18th European Union Contest for Young Scientists.

== Young Scientist and Technology Exhibition ==
At the time of her win Judge was a second-year student at Kinsale Community School in Kinsale. Her project involved the creation of a device to demonstrate when packaged food had gone out of date. It was called "The development and evaluation of a biological food spoilage indicator". The judges said her work involved "a highly innovative and creative use of experimental biology" and that it was "very impressive" and "a novel use of technology".

Judge was also part one of what was to become the first school in the country to be attended by multiple Young Scientist and Technology Exhibition winners in 2009 when her fellow students Liam McCarthy and John D. O'Callaghan won the same award whilst she was still a student there. McCarthy and O'Callaghan cited her success as an influence in encouraging them to compete and helping them to achieve their win.

Judge won the Young Scientist and Technology Exhibition at the RDS, Dublin on 13 January 2006.

== Media appearances, further competitions ==
Judge appeared on the Turkey Talking segment of children's television programme Dustin's Daily News in 2007 to discuss a CD she had created to assist science students with their examination revision. She went on to finish in third place at the 18th European Union Contest for Young Scientists, which was held in Sweden.

== Education ==
Judge went on to attain a bachelor's degree in chemical engineering at University College Dublin and a master's degree in biochemical engineering at University College London.
