= 1983 in Ireland =

- Centuries: 18th; 19th; 20th; 21st
- Decades: 1960s; 1970s; 1980s; 1990s; 2000s
- See also: 1983 in Northern Ireland; Other events of 1983; List of years in Ireland

Events from the year 1983 in Ireland.

== Incumbents ==
- President: Patrick Hillery
- Taoiseach: Garret FitzGerald (FG)
- Tánaiste: Dick Spring (Lab)
- Minister for Finance: Alan Dukes (FG)
- Chief Justice: Tom O'Higgins
- Dáil: 24th
- Seanad: 17th (from 23 February 1983)

== Events ==
- January – The satirical magazine The Phoenix was launched.
- 19 January – The government confirmed that the Garda Síochána bugged politicians' and journalists' telephones.
- 8 February – A motion calling for the resignation of Charles Haughey as leader failed after a 12-hour Fianna Fáil meeting.
- 9 February – The racehorse Shergar was kidnapped from Ballymany Stud in County Kildare.
- 14 April – The inaugural meeting of Aosdána, an affiliation of creative artists, took place in the Old Parliament Building in Dublin.
- 23 April – While more than 50 illegal pirate radio stations were broadcasting in Ireland, a Government memorandum described how their signals were interfering seriously with ambulance, fire brigade and police radio systems, airport traffic systems, and legitimate radio and television reception throughout the country. The document also referred to complaints received from other countries. The following month, equipment was seized from Radio Nova, Kiss FM and Radio Sunshine. Equipment was also removed from Community Radio 257 in Portmarnock in December.
- 25 April – Two thousand people demonstrated in Dublin against the proposed Pro-Life Amendment Bill (abortion).
- 18 May – Officials raided sites used by unlicensed operator Radio Nova in Dublin.
- 20 May – The funeral took place of former Tánaiste, Frank Aiken, in his native Camlough.
- 23 May – The Bushmills Distillery in County Antrim celebrated its 350th anniversary.
- 27 May – A Mexican jet stranded for five weeks at Mallow Racecourse departed.
- 30 May – The inaugural meeting of the New Ireland Forum took place at Dublin Castle.
- 10 June – Gerry Adams of Sinn Féin was elected the new Member of Parliament for West Belfast.
- 4 July – United States Vice President George Bush and his wife Barbara paid a one-day visit to Dublin. The Taoiseach, Garret FitzGerald, hosted a lunch in his honour at the State Apartments in Dublin Castle.

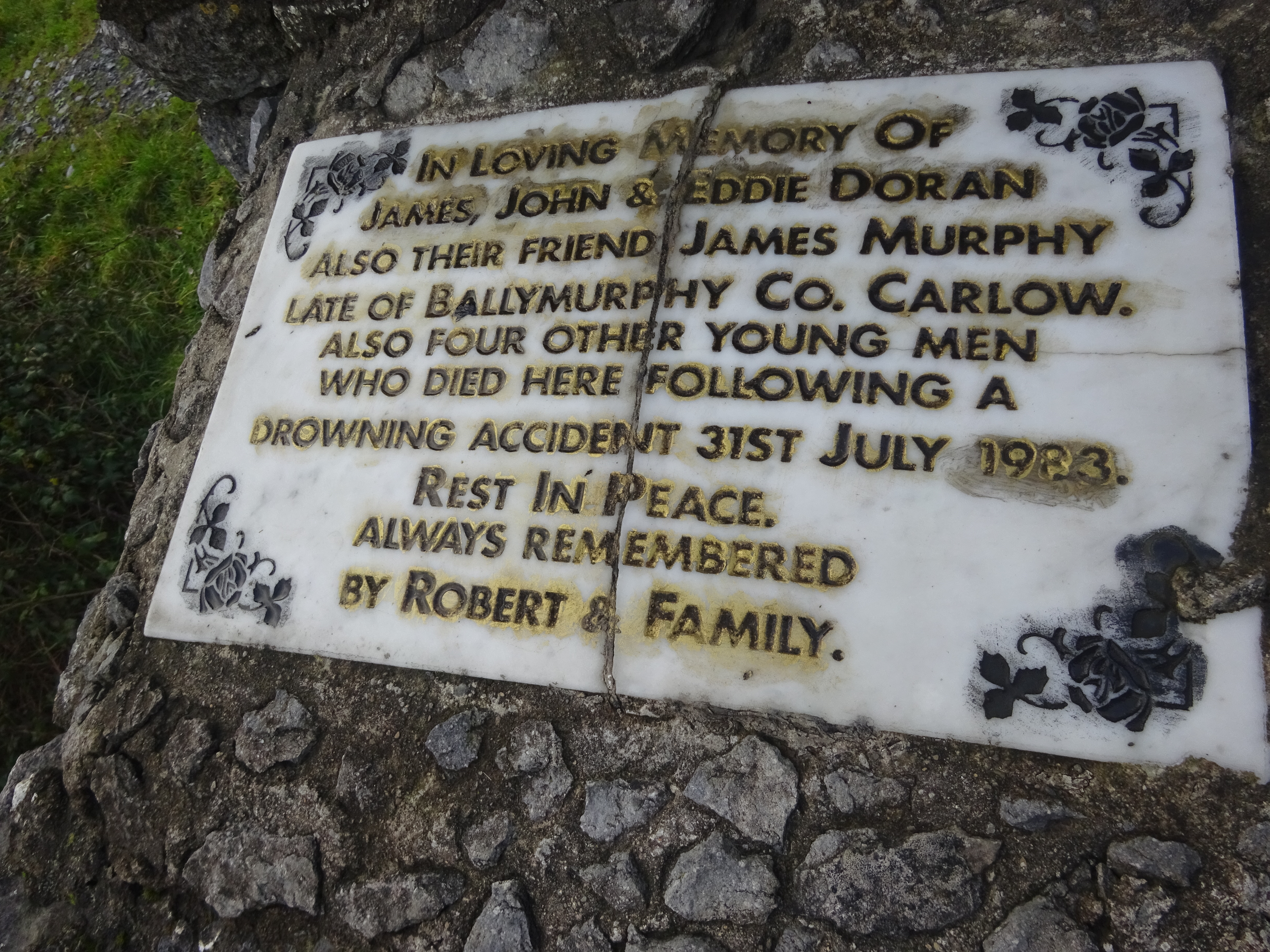
Memorial to the 1983 drowning victims at Doolin

- 31 July – Eight young men attending the Lisdoonvarna Music Festival drowned while swimming at Doolin.
- September – The Prime Minister of Zimbabwe, Robert Mugabe, paid a three-day state visit to Ireland with his wife, Sally. A guard of honour from the 5th Infantry Battalion greeted him at Dublin Airport, and the Army No. 1 Band played. The Taoiseach, Garret Fitzgerald, hosted a lunch in his honour at Iveagh House, and a banquet was held in Dublin Castle. Mugabe met Bishop Donal Lamont at Maynooth College on 9 September.
- 8 September – The referendum on the constitutional amendment in relation to abortion was carried by a two-to-one majority. This created equal constitutional recognition of the right to life of a pregnant woman and of her embryo or foetus.
- 16 September – The Government banned the Soviet airline, Aeroflot, from landing at Shannon Airport at the request of the President of the United States, Ronald Reagan, following the shooting down by the Soviet Union of Korean Air Lines Flight 007 with the loss of all 269 passengers and crew.
- 20 September – Leading politicians paid tribute to former Tánaiste George Colley (who died in a London hospital) as he was buried.
- 25 September – Maze Prison escape: 38 Provisional Irish Republican Army prisoners with arms escaped from HM Prison Maze in County Antrim.
- 1 October – The Concorde supersonic airliner paid its first visit to Dublin Airport. The landing of the Air France plane was watched by a large crowd from the observation deck on the roof of the terminal building. The flight came to bring passengers to Paris to see a horse race, the Prix de l'Arc de Triomphe.
- 5 October – The first stretch of motorway in the Republic of Ireland was opened – the eight-kilometre Naas bypass on the N7 national primary route.
- 25 November – Quinnsworth supermarket executive Don Tidey was kidnapped outside his home in Dublin by the Provisional IRA.
- 1 December – The Croppies Memorial Park in Dublin was officially opened, in a ceremony attended by the Lord Mayor
- 3 December – President Patrick Hillery was elected unopposed to his second and final seven-year term of office.
- 16 December – Don Tidey was rescued in County Leitrim. A soldier, Private Patrick Kelly, and Garda recruit, Gary Sheehan, were killed by the Provisional IRA during the rescue.

== Arts and literature ==
- 10 July – The Lark in the Park concert in Saint Anne's Park in Raheny featured performers the Rhythm Kings, Some Kind of Wonderful, and The Blades.
- 14 August – a concert was held at the Phoenix Park Racecourse in Dublin headlined by U2 and supported by Big Country, Eurythmics, Perfect Crime, Simple Minds, and Steel Pulse.
- August – Dorothy Nelson was awarded the Rooney Prize for Irish Literature for her novel In Night's City.
- 29 September – Tom Murphy's play The Gigli Concert opened at the Abbey Theatre, Dublin.
- Shaun Davey's orchestral suite for uilleann pipes The Pilgrim was first performed and recorded.
- Brendan Kennelly's poem sequence Cromwell was published.

== Sport ==
=== Association football ===
- Ireland recorded their biggest win in a full international by beating Malta 8–0 on 16 November in a Euro84 qualifier at Dalymount Park in Dublin.

=== Athletics ===
- Runner Eamonn Coghlan won the 5,000-metre gold medal at the World Championships in Helsinki.
- The inaugural Women's Mini Marathon took place in Dublin on 12 June 1983 with 9,000 participants.

=== Gaelic football ===
- Dublin GAA won the All-Ireland Senior Football Championship.

=== Golf ===
- The Irish Open was won by Seve Ballesteros (Spain).

=== Horse racing ===
- Stanerra becomes the first European-trained racehorse to win the Japan Cup.

=== Hurling ===
- Kilkenny GAA won the All-Ireland Senior Hurling Championship.

== Births ==
- 4 January – Kerry Condon, actress.
- 8 January – Jon Daly, soccer player.
- 15 January – Keith Fahey, soccer player.
- 18 January – Samantha Mumba, singer and actress.
- 8 February – John Gardiner, Cork hurler.
- 15 February – Martin Coleman Jnr, Cork hurler.
- 21 February – Eoin Macken, actor
- 22 February – Kieran Murphy (Sarsfields hurler), Cork and Sarsfields hurler.
- 1 March – Niall Moran, Limerick hurler.
- 9 March – Randal Plunkett, 21st Baron of Dunsany, filmmaker and landowner.
- 15 March – Neale Richmond, Fine Gael politician, member of Seanad Éireann.
- 16 March – Katie Kim, singer-songwriter
- 18 March – Setanta Ó hAilpín, Cork hurler and Australian Rules footballer.
- 22 March – Kenny Carroll, cricketer.
- 31 March – Paddy McCarthy, soccer player.
- 15 April – Eoghan McDermott, broadcast presenter.
- 20 April – Joanne King, actress.
- 7 May – Joanne McNally, comedian
- 12 May – Domhnall Gleeson, actor
- 18 May – Sean Thornton, soccer player.
- 27 May – Tommy Walsh, Kilkenny hurler.
- 10 June – Ger Farragher, Galway hurler.
- 19 June – Aidan Turner, actor.
- 7 July – Ciara Newell, singer-songwriter.
- 24 July – Joy Neville, rugby union international and referee.
- 28 July – Stephen Paisley, soccer player.
- 30 July – Sean Dillon, soccer player.
- 7 August – Patrick McWalter, soccer player.
- 13 August – Graham Gartland, soccer player.
- 6 September – Stephen Kelly, soccer player.
- 7 September – Philip Deignan, road racing cyclist.
- 10 September – Brian O Donoghue, Galway Gaelic footballer.
- 12 September – Carly Smithson, singer
- 16 September – Wayne Henderson, soccer player.
- 18 September – Kevin Doyle, soccer player
- 21 September – Sarah Rees Brennan, Irish novelist
- 4 October – Éamon Zayed, soccer player.
- 10 October – Daryl McMahon, soccer player.
- 22 October – Tomás O'Leary, rugby union scrum-half.
- 24 October – Katie McGrath, actress.
- 25 October – Aoibhinn Ní Shúilleabháin, singer, Rose of Tralee in 2005.
- 27 October – Stephen Hiney, Dublin hurler.
- 31 October – Katy French, model and socialite (died 2007).
- 28 November – Peter Hynes, soccer player.
- 28 November – Mick Flannery, folk music singer-songwriter.
- 29 December – Cian O'Connor, Cork hurler.

=== Full date unknown ===
- Linda Bhreathnach, actress.
- Philip Brennan, Dublin hurler.
- Thomas Gernon, winner of the Millennium Young Scientist and Technology Exhibition (Ireland).
- Daráine Mulvihill, television personality.
- Kieran Murphy, Cork and Erin's Own hurler.
- James O'Brien, Limerick hurler.

== Deaths ==
- 30 January – Alan Cunningham, soldier noted for victories in the East African Campaign during the Second World War (born 1887).
- 8 February – Reginald N. Webster, businessman in America and Thoroughbred racehorse owner (born 1898).
- 16 March – Francis Connell, cricketer (born 1902).
- 20 March – Sheila Galvin, Fianna Fáil TD (born 1914).
- 25 March – Constantine Fitzgibbon, historian and novelist (born 1919).
- 20 April – Sarah Makem, traditional singer (born 1900).
- 6 May – Mícheál Ó Móráin, Fianna Fáil TD and Cabinet Minister (born 1912).
- 18 May – Frank Aiken, Fianna Fáil TD and founding member, Cabinet Minister and Tánaiste (born 1898).
- 4 July – John Bodkin Adams, general practitioner in Eastbourne cleared of murdering one of his patients (born 1899).
- 21 August – Francis Evans, British diplomat (born 1897).
- 24 August – Johnny Quirke, Cork hurler (born 1911).
- 17 September – George Colley, Fianna Fáil TD, held six Ministerial posts including Tánaiste (born 1925).
- 18 September – Con Lehane, nationalist, member of the IRA Army Council and Dáil representative (born 1912).
- 24 October – Anthony Barry, businessman, Fine Gael TD, Seanad member and Lord Mayor of Cork (born 1901).
- 28 October – Roderick Gill, cricketer (born 1919).
- 22 November – Leonard Wibberley, author (born 1915).
- 23 December – Colin Middleton, artist (born 1910).

=== Full date unknown ===
- Séamus Bhriain Mac Amhlaig, last known speaker of the Antrim dialect of the Irish language.
- David Neligan, policeman, "The Spy in the Castle" for Michael Collins (born 1899).
- Jim Ware, Waterford hurler (born 1908).

== See also ==
- 1983 in Irish television
