= McWalter =

McWalter is a surname. Notable people with the surname include:

- David McWalter (1891–1918), Scottish footballer
- Mark McWalter (born 1968), Scottish footballer
- Patrick McWalter (born 1984), Irish footballer
- Tony McWalter (born 1945), English politician

== Film ==
- McWalter, French 2025 action movie about the eponymous fictional secret agent portrayed by Mister V
