= Emer Jones =

Irish science student (born 1994)

- Born: 1994 (age 31–32)
- Known for: Examining sandbags
- Awards: BT Young Scientist of the Year (2008)

Emer Jones (born 1994) is an Irish student from Tralee, County Kerry. She was the winner of the 44th Young Scientist and Technology Exhibition in 2008 at the age of thirteen, becoming the competition's youngest ever winner at that time. She was also the first winner from County Kerry and won in the year her school first entered the competition.

Jones won the Young Scientist and Technology Exhibition at the RDS, Dublin on 11 January 2008.

She went on to represent Ireland at the 20th European Union Contest for Young Scientists in Copenhagen, Denmark in September 2008. She later studied physical natural sciences at Cambridge University.
