= Liam McCarthy and John D. O'Callaghan =

2009 EU Young Scientists of the Year

- Born: 1995/96 and 1994/95
- Known for: Inventing a milk-testing apparatus
- Awards: BT Young Scientists of the Year (2009); EU Young Scientists of the Year (2009)

Liam McCarthy (born 1995/96) and John D. O'Callaghan (born 1994/95) are Irish students from Kinsale, County Cork. They were the winners of the 45th Young Scientist and Technology Exhibition in 2009 at the ages of thirteen and fourteen respectively. Their win meant that their school, Kinsale Community School, became the first school in the country to be attended by multiple Young Scientist and Technology Exhibition winners after their fellow student Aisling Judge won the same award in 2006. McCarthy and O'Callaghan went on to be named EU Young Scientists of the Year in September 2009.

== Young Scientist and Technology Exhibition ==
McCarthy and O'Callaghan were second-year students at Kinsale Community School in County Cork at the time of their competition win. They come from a background of dairy farming. Their project at the exhibition was titled "'The Development of a Convenient Test Method for Somatic Cell Count and Its Importance in Milk Production". Their intention was to mix detergent with milk to reduce somatic cells. The judges described their invention as "marketable" and "of tremendous commercial help to farmers".

The announcement was made at a ceremony on the night of 9 January 2009 in the exhibition hall. The judges claimed their decision was an easy one. Taoiseach Brian Cowen was on hand to announce the winner. Their prize was a €5,000 cheque and a trophy of Waterford Crystal.

== European Union Contest for Young Scientists ==
They went on to represent Ireland at the 21st European Union Contest for Young Scientists in Paris, France in September 2009. They received first prize, announced on the night of 15 September 2009, and won €7,000 in prize money. They returned to the Young Scientist and Technology Exhibition in 2010 to accept applause and cheers from the audience.

== Future plans, as of 2009 ==
McCarthy and O'Callaghan wish to study and work in farming and science as, according to O'Callaghan, "the importance of the agriculture sector on the [Irish] economy is huge". They said they drew inspiration from 2006 winner and fellow student at Kinsale Community School, Aisling Judge.
