= Ciara Judge =

Irish scientist

- Born: 1997 (age 28–29)
- Known for: Combating the global food crisis: Diazotroph Bacteria as a Cereal Crop Growth Promoter
- Awards: Grand Prizewinner in Google Science Fair (2014) Joint Top Result in Irish State Examinations taken by over 60,000 15 & 16 years olds across Ireland in 2013; 1st Place Winner in 25th EU Young Scientist of the Year (2013) BT Young Scientist of the Year (2013)

Ciara Judge is an Irish scientist from Kinsale, County Cork and a public speaker. She was a finalist of the 42nd BT Young Scientist and Technology Exhibition in 2013 at the age of fifteen with two others: Emer Hickey, Sophie Healy-Thow. She also won a First place Award in the European Union Contest for Young Scientists 2013. In 2014, she jointly with her 2 friends won the grand prize in Google Science Fair Ciara was also listed as one of the 25 most influential teens in Time for the year 2014 as a result of her innovation.

== The innovation ==
At the time of her win, Judge was a second-year student at Kinsale Community School in Kinsale. Their project involved a statistical investigation of the effects of Diazotroph bacteria on plant germination. They investigated how the bacteria could be used to fight world hunger. Their project aims to provide a solution to low crop yields by pairing a nitrogen-fixing bacteria in the soil with cereal crops. They found their test crops germinated in half the time and had a drymass yield up to 7 percent greater than usual.

== Activities ==
Ciara is a former member of the Irish Digital Youth Council. She has previously written as a guest columnist in Ireland's technology website (siliconrepublic.com). She was honoured for her interest in STEM (Science, Technology, Engineering and Mathematics) and awarded received a 'Role Model: Rising Star' award. She was a speaker at the Excited digital learning conference at Dublin Castle in June 2014. In September 2014, Ciara was a keynote speaker at the Irish Digital Forum in Dublin.
