= Royal Dublin Society =

Philanthropic organisation and its campus in Dublin, Ireland

The Royal Dublin Society
- Abbreviation: RDS
- Formation: 25 June 1731; 295 years ago
- Type: Charitable
- Headquarters: Ballsbridge, Dublin, Ireland
- Coordinates: 53°19′36″N 6°13′43″W
- Region served: Ireland
- President: Prof Owen Lewis
- Website: rds.ie
- Formerly called: The Dublin Society (1731–1820)

The Royal Dublin Society (RDS) is an Irish philanthropic organisation and members club which was founded as the 'Dublin Society' on 25 June 1731 with the aim to see Ireland thrive culturally and economically. It was long active as a learned society, especially in agriculture, and played a major role in the development of Ireland’s national library and museums.

The RDS is synonymous with its 160,000-square-metre (1,700,000 sq ft) campus in Ballsbridge, Dublin, Ireland. The premises include the 'RDS Arena', 'RDS Simmonscourt', 'RDS Main Hall' and other venues which are used regularly for exhibitions, concerts and sporting events like the Dublin Horse Show or Leinster Rugby games. The Royal Dublin Society was granted royal patronage in 1820 by George IV. The RDS Members' Club is a members-only club offering exclusive access to sports events on its premises and weekly luncheons and dinners.

The RDS is one of nine organisations that may nominate candidates for the Seanad Éireann (Irish upper house of parliament) elections on the Agriculture panel.

== Name and history ==
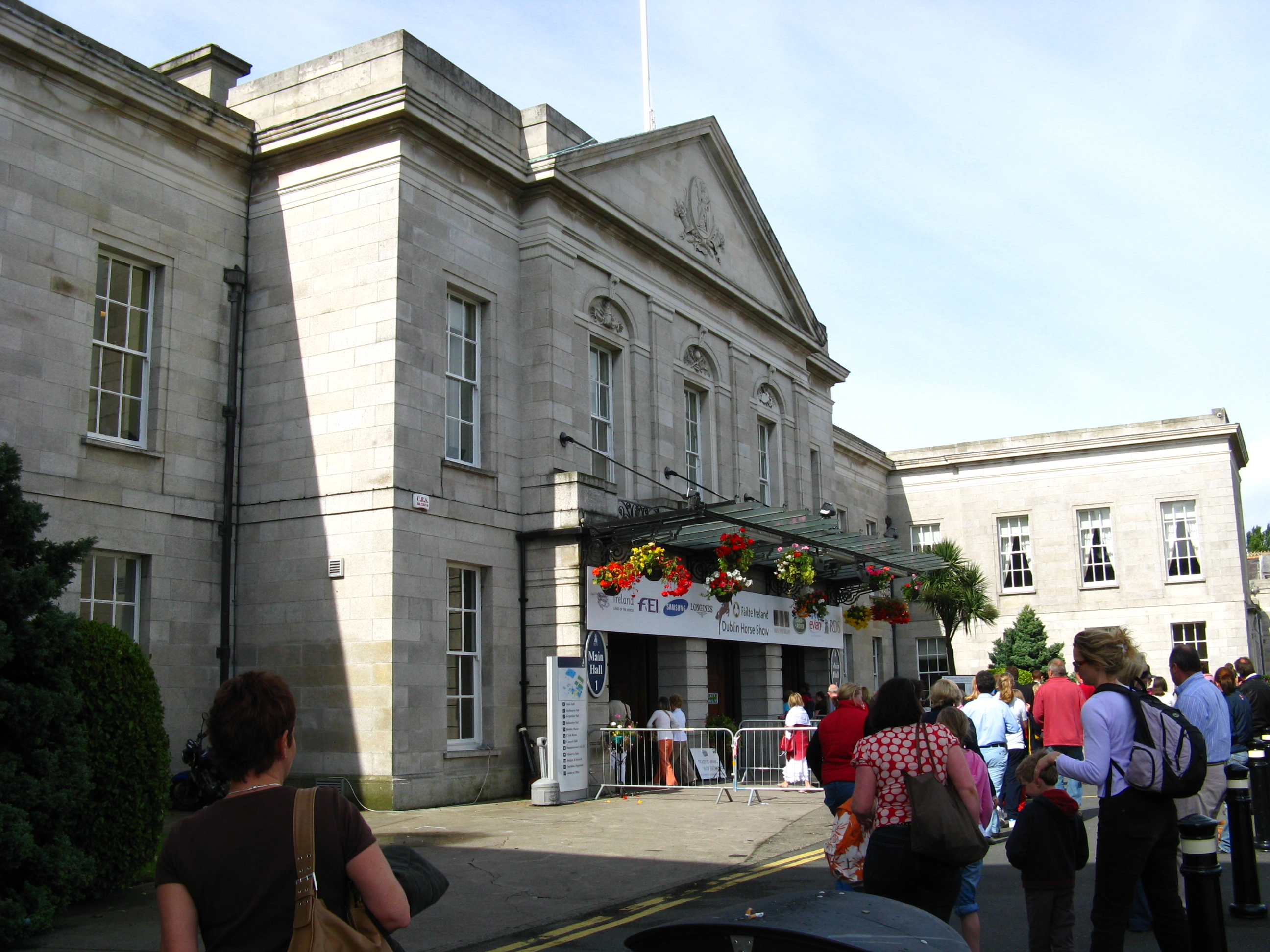
RDS Main Hall entrance (2008)

The society was founded mainly by members of the Dublin Philosophical Society, chiefly Thomas Prior, as the 'Dublin Society for improving Husbandry, Manufactures and other Useful Arts'. Other founding members included Arthur Dobbs. On 1 July 1731 – at the second meeting of the society – the designation 'and Sciences' was added to the end of its name. The society's broad agenda was to stimulate economic activity and aid the creation of employment in Ireland. For the first few years of its existence, the Dublin Society concentrated on tillage technology, land reclamation, forestry, the production of dyestuffs, flax cultivation and other agricultural areas.

In 1738, following the publication of his pamphlet entitled 'Reflections and Resolutions Proper for the Gentlemen of Ireland', Samuel Madden initiated a grant or 'premium' scheme to create incentives for improvements in Irish agricultural and arts. He proposed a fund of £500 be raised for this and he personally contributed £130. By 1740 the premium scheme had raised £900, and was adjudicated upon the following January and awarded to enterprises in earthenware, cotton, leatherwork, flax, surveying, as well as a number of painters and sculptors.

In 1761, the Irish Parliament voted for £12,000 to be given to the Dublin Society for the promotion of agriculture, forestry, arts, and manufactures. This funding was used to increase the amount of premiums distributed by the Dublin Society. Further funds were given by Parliament to the Dublin Society on a sporadic basis until 1784 when an annual parliamentary vote of £5,000 was put in place and remained so until the dissolution of Grattan's Parliament in 1800.

The society was known for possessing a primarily wealthy membership.

The "Royal" prefix was adopted in 1820 when George IV became society patron. A gallery of Irish sculpture at the Society in 1847. Despite the independence of most of Ireland from the United Kingdom with the Anglo-Irish Treaty in December 1922 as the Irish Free State, the RDS is one of several organisations based in the Republic of Ireland that retain their royal prefix (see List of organisations based in the Republic of Ireland with royal patronage).

In 1988, it faced a severe financial crisis. Facing debts of £1.5 million, it sold off some of the land it owned within the vicinity. In 1989, the society held its first contested election for president in 258 years, including a female candidate for the first time, Dr Dervilla Donnelly. Donnelly was subsequently elected and became the first female president. It had approximately 10,500 members during this period.

In 2018, An Post launched a series of stamps commemorating the Royal Dublin Society.

As of 2019, the RDS reportedly had 3,500 members.

Among its past presidents include the grandfather of author and television presenter, Turtle Bunbury, known as "one of Ireland’s last Anglo-Irish gentlemen farmers," Gilbert Butler (1910-2002). John Dardis has also served as president.

In 2023, Johnny Sexton was awarded honorary life membership.

== Arts ==
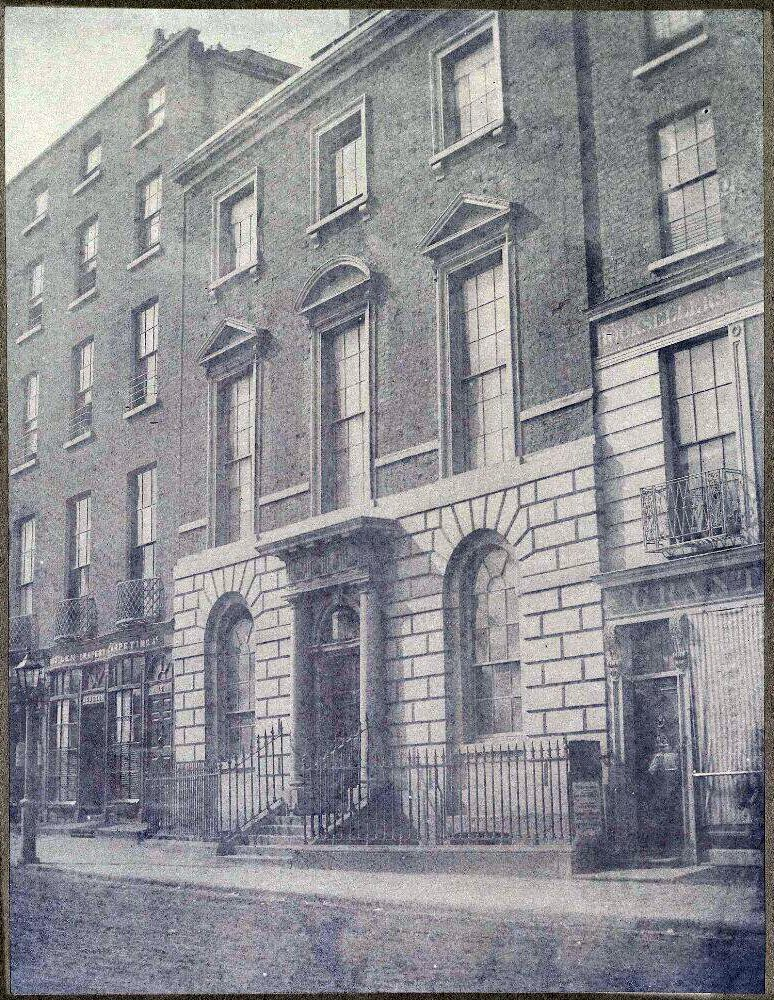
The headquarters of navigation house at 112 Grafton Street from its construction in 1767 until it moved to a new larger premises at Hawkins Street in 1796.

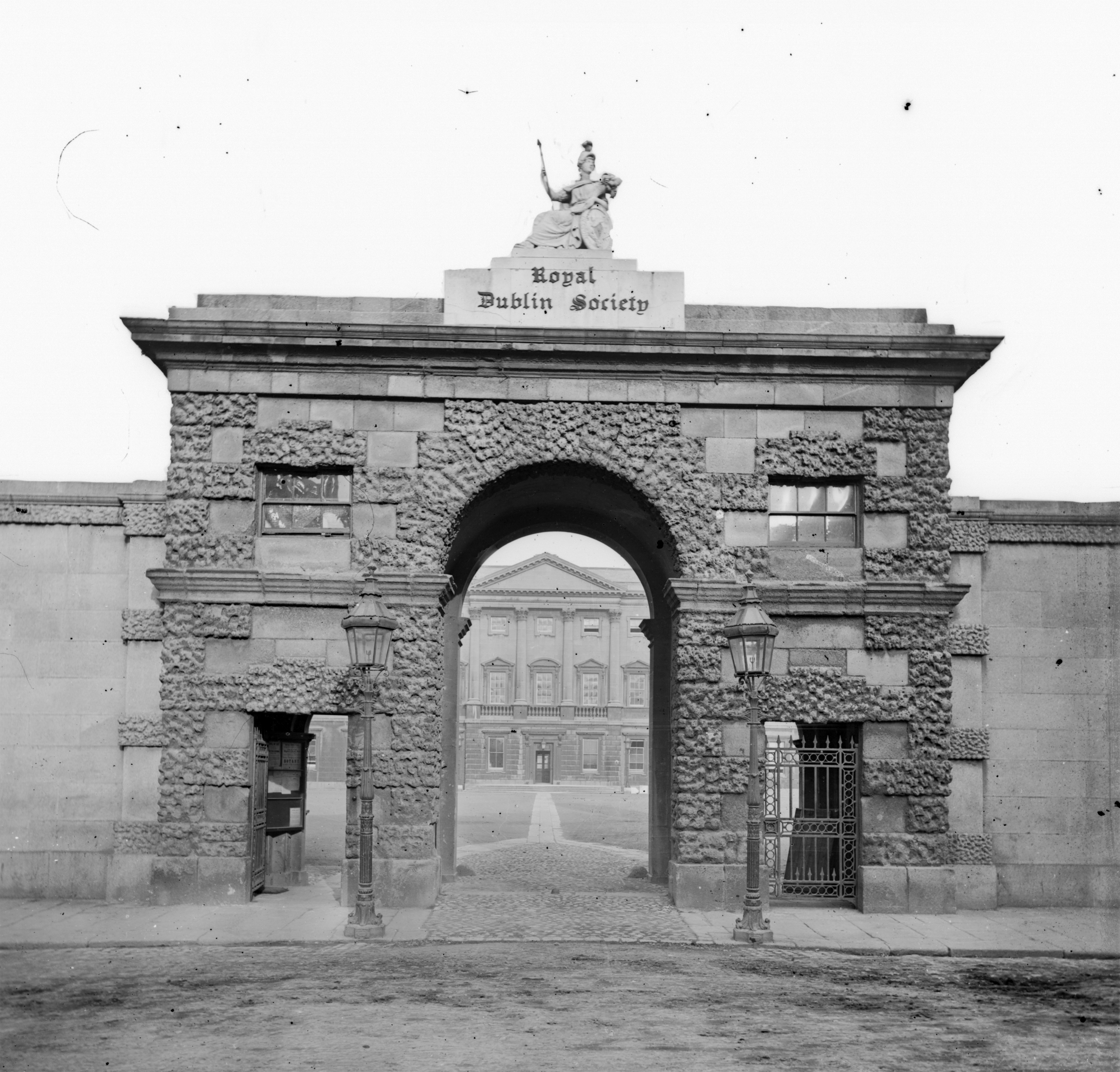
Entrance arch to Leinster House, home of the RDS, c.1863–1880.

On foot of the successful award of premiums to artists and the public interest in this area, the RDS decided to establish an arts school. Through successful petitioning of the then Lord Lieutenant, Lord Chesterfield, it applied for government support and was awarded an annual grant of £500 in 1746. The drawing school was established in 1750 and had an early emphasis on figure drawing, landscape and ornament, with architectural drawing added in the 1760s. Tuition was free and popular among people of a wide variety of trades and backgrounds. A notable student was James Hoban, who attended in the 1780s and went on to design the White House, in Washington DC. Among the artists who attended the RDS schools of art or were awarded premiums by the Society were: James Barry, George Barrett, Francis Danby, Edward Smyth, John Hogan.

In 1867, as part of a wider initiative, the government took control of the RDS art school, which subsequently became the Dublin Metropolitan School of Art, and later became the National College of Art and Design.

The annual RDS Visual Art Awards incorporate the RDS Taylor Art Award which has been awarded since 1878. This award is now valued at €10,000 and is open to Irish visual art graduates. The total prize fund for the RDS Visual Art Awards is €30,000.

Former notable winners of the RDS Taylor Art Award include: Walter Osborne, William Orpen, Seán Keating, Mainie Jellet, Colin Midleton, Nora McGuinness and Louis le Brocquy, as well as more contemporary artists such as Eamon O'Kane, Dorothy Cross James Hanley and Conor Walton.

== Music ==
The RDS association with classical music extends back to 1886 when it first organised a series of popular recitals that took place over a phased basis from March, and it included works by Corelli, Haydn and Beethoven performed by teaching staff of the Royal Irish Academy of Music.

In subsequent years a number of RDS recitals were recorded by RTÉ for broadcast. The RDS chamber recitals continued into 1980s and 1990s, hosting artists such as András Schiff, Jessye Norman, Isaac Stern and Nigel Kennedy. The last RDS chamber recital was held in October 2002 and featured Irish pianist Hugh Tinney.

The RDS became the main venue for Feis Ceoil in 1983 onward. In 2003 it offered its first RDS Music Bursary of €10,000 to one of the winners of selected Feis Ceoil senior competitions. The RDS Music Bursary currently offers two prizes, one of €15,000 and the RDS Jago Award of €5,000. Both prizes also offer performance engagements. An additional prize, the RDS Collins Memorial Performance Award is given to a former Music Bursary winner each year, offering them a professional performance opportunity with Blackwater Valley Opera Festival.

== Agriculture ==
Agriculture has been a persistent theme of endeavour since the foundation of the Dublin Society. In its first eighteen months, the Society reprinted or published up-to-date material on the latest agricultural innovations, such as Jethro Tull's book on Tillage, a paper 'on improvement of flax by changing the soil' and 'a new method of draining marshy and boggy lands'. The Society followed this in the year to come with further publications on grass cultivation, saffron planting, drainage, management of hops, bee management, wool production and tillage. They also held demonstrations on how to use newly designed farm machinery.

Forestry was encouraged from an equally early stage with records of the Society showing that premiums were increasingly awarded for afforestation from 1742 onwards. Between 1766 and 1806 over 55 million trees were planted in Ireland on foot of the Society's initiatives.

The genesis of Dublin's Botanic Gardens can be found in the minute books of the Dublin Society as far back as 1732. From this time onwards, the Dublin Society sporadically leased land around the city to conduct agricultural and botanic experiments and initiatives. In 1790, enabled by funding from the Irish Parliament, the Society leased land in Glasnevin with the intent of making the lands ready for delivering public education on botany. It appointed a professor of Botany to oversee the gardens along with an experienced head gardener from Scotland. With the completion of offices and greenhouses in 1799, the Botanic Gardens, Dublin were opened in 1800 and remained in the care of the Society until 1877 when they were transferred over to the State.

In 1845, the early signs of potato blight that would go on to have a devastating effect on Ireland were detected by the RDS in the Botanic Gardens. The Society offered a prize of £20 for the best research on the poorly understood disease. Utilising knowledge of both agriculture and science, the Society directed its own scientists to find remedies, but despite many trials and experiments both in the Botanic Gardens and in the Society's laboratory in Leinster House, they were unable to find one.

The first Spring Show was held in April 1831 on the grounds of Leinster House, Kildare Street, the purpose of which was to encourage best breeding practices in livestock by showcasing the best in the country. By 1848 the judges of the Show were satisfied that English breeders would soon be purchasing Irish stock such was the quality of cattle breeding on display. Their confidence was validated in 1856 at the Paris International Cattle Show where Irish shorthorn cattle took more prizes in proportion to livestock displayed, than their English and Scottish counterparts combined. The Spring Show moved to the RDS grounds of Ballsbridge in 1881 and continued it there until the last Spring Show took place in 1992.

The association with agriculture persists to today and it forms an important part of the Society's philanthropic mission. The RDS Forestry and Woodland Awards have been awarded annually since 1988 and in 2017 had a prize fund of €15,000 which is spread across four different categories. In 2016 the RDS, in conjunction with the IIEA, outlined the framework of a 'Climate Smart Agriculture' plan for Ireland. The Society continues to award annual prizes for the best cattle in Ireland, including the Economic Breeding Index (EBI) dairy cow. In 2021 the RDS was the host of the National Dialogues on Ireland's Food System, part of Ireland's engagement with the United Nations Food Systems Summit 2021.

== Science ==
In the early period of the Society, science was innately linked to agriculture and industry. A link that continued well into the nineteenth century; for instance, the Botanic Gardens had cross-over appeal to both science and agriculture, as did the public lectures in veterinary science. But science began to also carve out its own separate area of interests towards the latter end of the eighteenth century with professorships in chemistry and physics funded by the Society in the 1790s, the employment of an itinerant geologist who toured Ireland collecting specimens for the Society, and the purchase of the Leskean Cabinet of minerals in 1792.

The Dublin Society began holding science lectures covering an array of topics in 1797, with lectures on physics and chemistry made open to the public in 1824. In 1810 a large laboratory and lecture room were built in Hawkins House and a similar facility was constructed in Leinster House when the Society moved there, allowing the public lectures on science to continue (in what is now the Dáil Chamber in the Houses of the Oireachtas). In 1835 the RDS co-hosted the British Association for the Advancement of Science, which it also did again in 1957, and from 1838 commenced sponsoring science lectures outside of Dublin.

In 1903, the Society imported radium into Ireland for the first time and through experimental methods, devised by RDS Members John Joly and Walter Stevenson, one of the earliest forms of cancer treatment was created to much international acclaim. It subsequently became known as the 'Dublin method'. In 1914 the Society established the Irish Radium Institute to supply radon to Irish hospitals, a function it carried out until the Irish Radiological Institute was established in 1952.

In 1961, the RDS held its first exhibition on atomic energy which was followed up in 1963 and 1966, garnering audiences of over 30,000. The Young Scientists and Technology Exhibition was started at this time by physicists Tom Burke and Tony Scott, the latter being a member of the RDS Science Committee. The Exhibition has been held in the RDS since 1966.

Today, the RDS continues to promote science in Ireland through the awarding of the Boyle Medal on a biennial basis, alternating between a scientist based in Ireland and an Irish scientist based abroad, with a prize of €20,000. The Boyle Medal has been awarded since 1899 and is Ireland's most prestigious scientific honour.

The RDS Primary Science Fair encouraged primary school classes to explore science hypotheses and from 2017 operated in three cities around Ireland, with over 7,000 participating children across all three venues. The RDS Primary Science Fair was cited as a positive example of informal science education by the Government commissioned 'STEM Education in the Irish School System'. In 2019 the RDS developed Science Blast and ESB came on board as title sponsors. Science Blast is managed and delivered by the RDS. In its first year it had over 10,000 primary school pupils engaged with STEM.

RDS STEM Learning is a continuous professional development programme for primary school teachers to gain confidence in teaching science in the classroom.

== Headquarters and venues ==
=== Grafton Street ===
The society constructed a house on Grafton Street as its first headquarters around 1766-67 and met for the first time there on the 3rd of December 1767. Adjacent to Navigation House, the office of the Commissioners for improving Inland Navigation and which later became the headquarters of the Royal Irish Academy. It is likely the building was designed by Christopher Myers although Thomas Ivory was involved in designing part of a museum space.

The schools of drawing were located at the rear of the buildings and were also designed by Myers.

The last meeting of the society at Grafton Street was held on the 4th of August 1796 and the building was then sold for £3,000.

=== Hawkins Street ===
A large dedicated headquarters for the society was developed at Hawkins Street close to the River Liffey in 1796.

In 1820, the building was demolished and replaced with the Theatre Royal.

=== Leinster House ===
The society purchased Leinster House, home of the Duke of Leinster, in 1815 and founded a natural history museum there.

== Ballsbridge ==
Seating capacity
Main Hall Complex
RDS Main Hall	4,000
Shelbourne Hall	3,000
Serpentine Hall	1,000
Industries Hall	2,500
Concert Hall Complex
RDS Concert Hall	1,000
Clyde Room	350
Simmonscourt Complex
Hall 8A	2,350
Hall 8B	2,500
Simmonscourt Main Hall	6,500
Hall 8D	750
Hall 8E	1,000

The society acquired its current premises at Ballsbridge in 1879, and has since increased from the original fifteen to forty acres (60,000 to 160,000 m^{2}). The premises consist of a number of exhibition halls (at the "RDS Main Hall"), a multi-purpose sports stadium (the "RDS Arena"), meeting rooms, bars, restaurants, and a multi-purpose indoor venue named "RDS Simmonscourt Pavilion". It also acquired the adjacent site of St. Mary's Church, Donnybrook in 2022 for €4m which is now used as a smaller event venue and carpark for the main arena.

In 1890, an M. J. B. Baddeley tourist guidebook to Ireland described the various workings of the RDS to the visitor:

The Royal Dublin Society, founded in 1731, for the Advancement of Agriculture, Manufactures, Science, &c., in 1815 purchased the town-house of the Dukes of Leinster, which, subject to alterations and additions, is its present abode. An incidental portion of the Society's work–the administration of the Museum, School of Art, Library, and Botanic Gardens, has been transferred to South Kensington. The Society possesses a splendid show ground at Ball's Bridge, near Dublin. It holds cattle shows in spring and, in August, a very important horse show. In the Hall is a large Statue of George IV., by Behnes, and busts of many eminent men. The visitor will be interested to see a large collection of photographs representing the antiquities–abbeys, towers, crosses, &c., of Ireland.

=== RDS Main Hall ===
The RDS Main Hall is a major centre for exhibitions, concerts and other cultural events in Dublin. It hosts, for example, the Young Scientist and Technology Exhibition each January.

=== RDS Simmonscourt ===
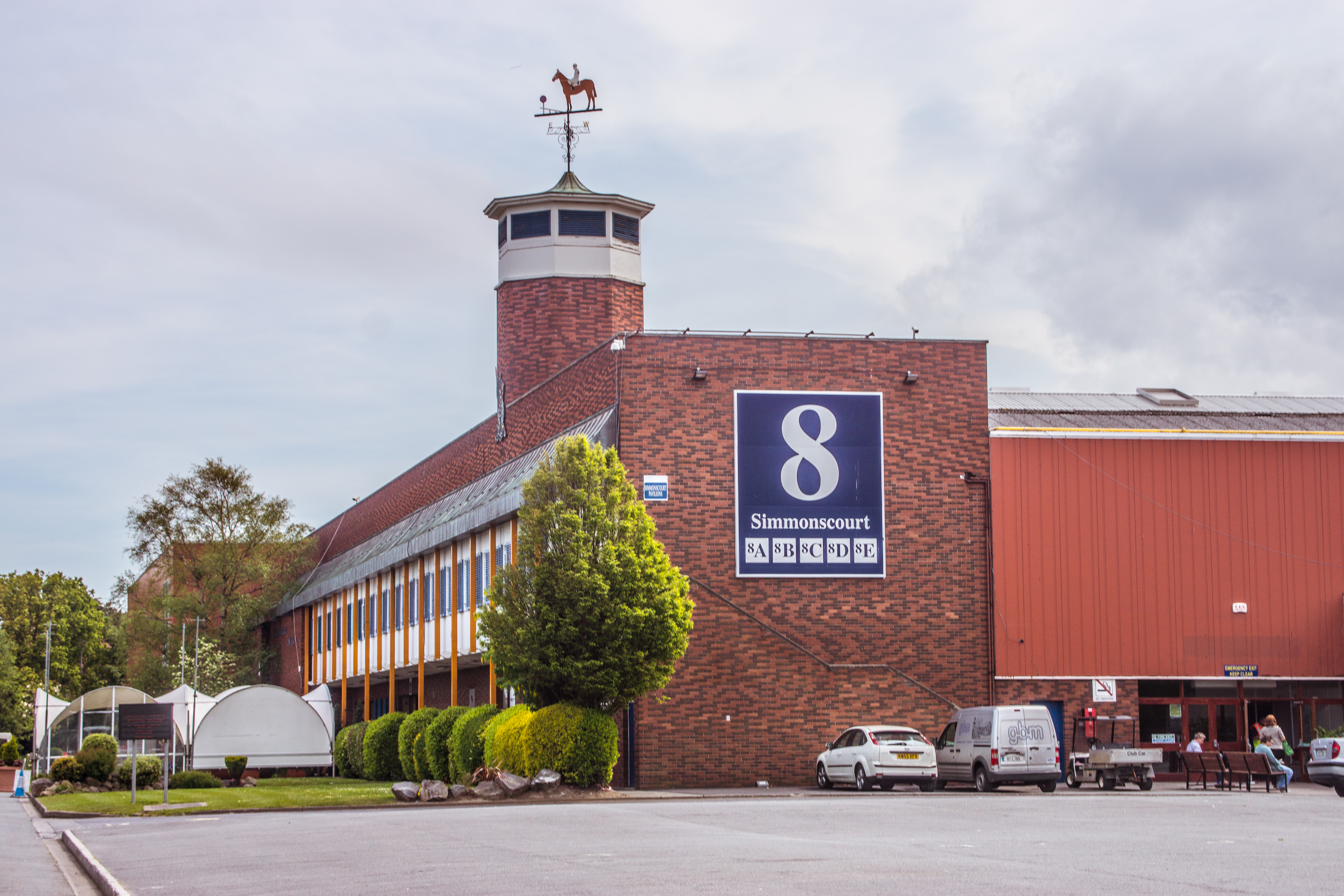
RDS Simmonscourt in May 2012.

The multi-purpose RDS Simmonscourt (also known as RDS Simmonscourt Pavilion or Simmonscourt Main Hall) has a capacity of approximately 7,000 (6,500 theatre style) and is the largest hall in the complex. The hall can be used as stand-alone venue but can also be split into five smaller interconnecting event spaces.

It has hosted the Meteor Music Awards in 2008, 2009 and 2010, touring ice show Disney on Ice, as well as a number of concerts including Thin Lizzy in 1982 and 1983, Neil Young, Queen, AC/DC, The Smashing Pumpkins and My Chemical Romance, and the Eurovision Song Contest in 1981 and 1988. Simmonscourt is where the show jumping horses are stabled during the week of the Dublin Horse Show.

Preceded by Centenary Palace; Brussels	Eurovision Song Contest; Venue; 1988	Succeeded by Palais de Beaulieu; Lausanne
Preceded by Nederlands Congresgebouw; The Hague	Eurovision Song Contest; Venue; 1981	Succeeded by Harrogate International Centre; Harrogate

=== RDS Arena ===
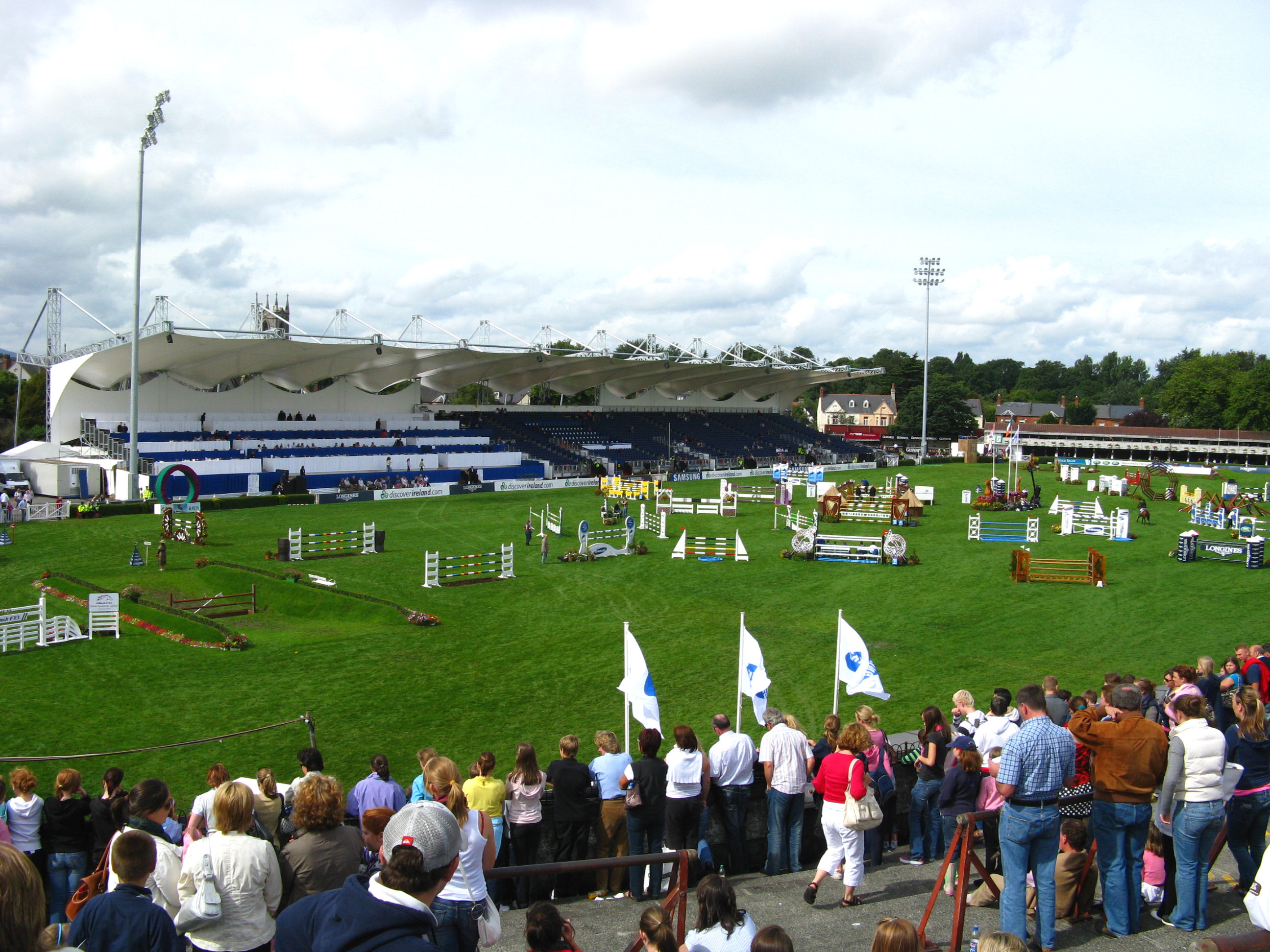
Main arena

The RDS Arena (more commonly known simply as the RDS) was developed to host equestrian events, including the annual Dublin Horse Show. It is often used for other sporting events, however – primarily football and rugby. Between September 1990 and April 1996 it was used for home games of Shamrock Rovers football club, on 19 February 1992 it played host to a home game between the Republic of Ireland national football team and Wales, and hosted the 2007 and 2008 FAI Cup finals.

In 2007 and 2008 the arena's capacity was expanded to 18,250 (with additional seated stands being built), and the venue is now used by the Leinster Rugby team for home games. The club also moved their Leinster Rugby Store to the RDS (between the two parade rings), and it is open on match days.

The covered Anglesea Stand is the oldest stand in the ground below which there is a small amount of terracing. Opposite the Anglesea Stand is the Grandstand which contains the TV gantry and was covered with a roof in 2008. Behind the goals are the uncovered North and South stands which are removed for show jumping events to allow for extra space.

As of 2025, it was the subject of a €52 million investment programme.

The DART runs close to the RDS premises with Lansdowne and Sandymount being the closest stops. The RDS is served by bus route numbers 4, 7, 18 and 27x, which stop outside the Main Hall Entrance to the RDS on Merrion Road.

== Events ==
=== Dublin Horse Show ===
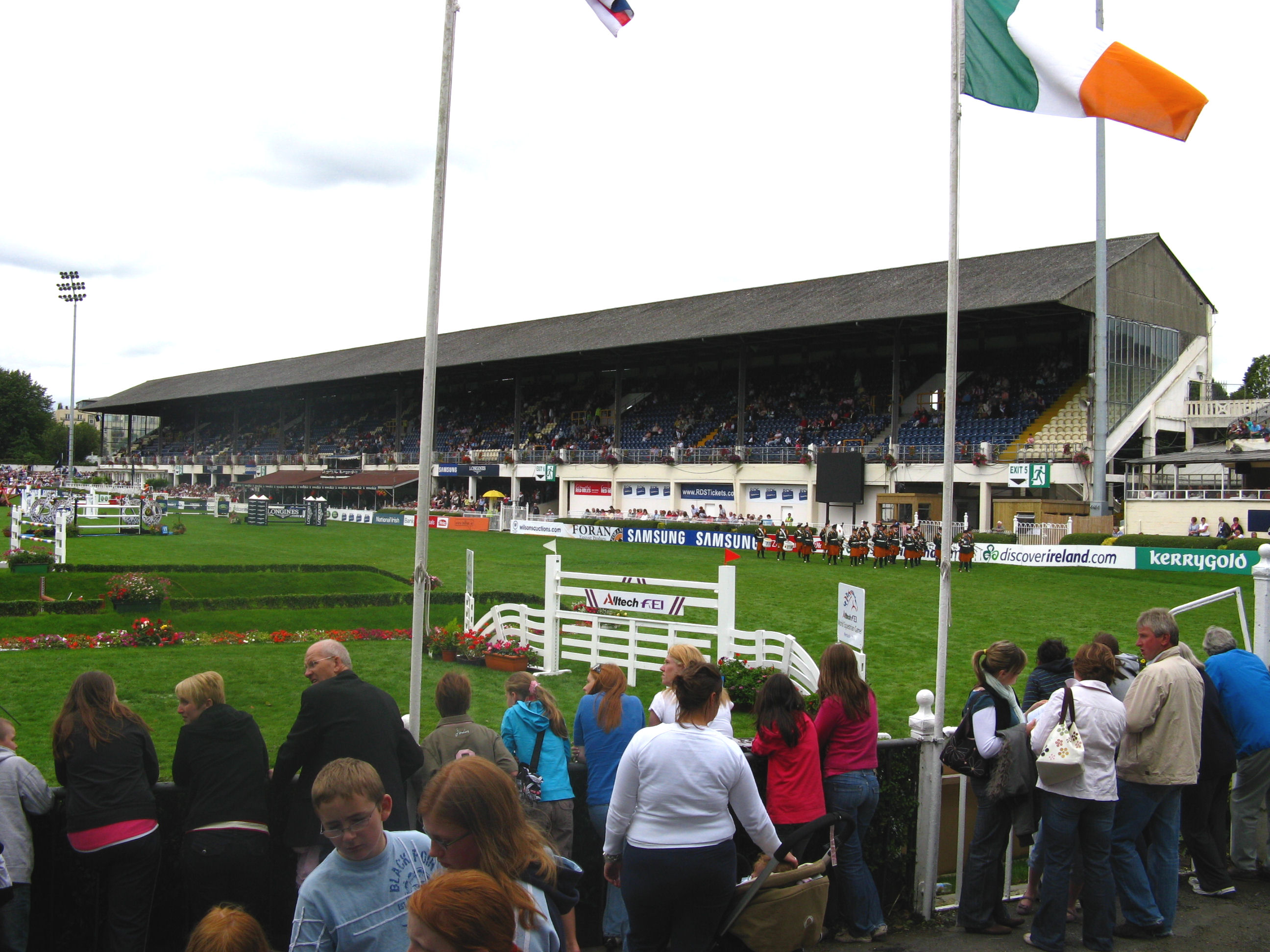
Anglesea stand

The first Dublin Horse Show took place in 1864 and was operated in conjunction with the Royal Agricultural Society of Ireland. The first solely Society-run Horse Show was held in 1868 and was one of the earliest "leaping" competitions ever held. Over time it has become a high-profile International show jumping competition, national showing competition and major entertainment event in Ireland. In 1982 the RDS hosted the Show Jumping World Championships and incorporated it into the Dublin Horse Show of that year. The Dublin Horse Show has over 130 classes and they can be generally categorised into the following types of equestrian competitions: showing classes, performance classes and show jumping classes.

As a result of the COVID-19 pandemic, on 20 April 2020, the RDS announced that the Dublin Horse Show—scheduled for 15–19 July—was cancelled, the first time this had occurred since 1940.

As reported by Town and Country, the Royal Dublin Society hosted the 150th Dublin Horse Show in August 2025. Princess Anne attended the event’s opening day. A former Olympic Games equestrian, she presented rosettes to competitors and met with representatives of equestrian charities.

=== Concerts ===
In recent years, the venue has been used as a music venue, for many rock, heavy metal and pop artists.

Bruce Springsteen has played there eleven times since 1988: The Tunnel of Love Express Tour (1988), The Other Band Tour (1993), The Reunion Tour (1999), The Rising Tour (2003), The Magic Tour (2008), three times for The Working on a Dream Tour (2009), and twice for The Wrecking Ball Tour (2012). He played for 40,000 people during The Rising Tour in May 2003, 115,500 people at the arena during his Magic Tour in May 2008, and 80,000+ people during his Working on a Dream Tour.

In June 2008, American band Paramore played their debut Irish concert in the RDS Arena.

Other notable performers who have played in the main arena include: Iron Maiden, Bon Jovi, Kanye West, Michael Jackson, Tina Turner, Kylie Minogue, Radiohead, Shania Twain, The Cure and Metallica among others. U2 played 2 dates of their "Zooropa" tour on 27 and 28 August 1993 in the main Arena.

On 30 April 1988, the Eurovision Song Contest took place in the Simmonscourt Main Hall and was won by Celine Dion. Seven years earlier, on 4 April 1981, the venue also hosted the contest with British pop group Bucks Fizz being the eventual winners.

=== Professional wrestling ===
In 2005, the RDS hosted a WWE SmackDown event as part of the WWE Summerbash tour of Europe. The event featured wrestlers such as Stone Cold Steve Austin, John Cena, Kurt Angle, and Rey Mysterio.

=== Rugby Union ===
The RDS is the home of Leinster Rugby. The RDS hosts Leinster's home matches in the United Rugby Championship and the European Rugby Champions Cup as well as some pre-season games. In March 2008, the final of the Leinster Schools Senior Cup was played in the RDS due to the redevelopment of Lansdowne Road, its traditional venue. An autumn international between Ireland and Fiji was played 21 November 2009.

=== Association Football ===
Shamrock Rovers F.C. played their home matches at the RDS stadium between 1990 and 1996, including against Górnik Zabrze in the 1994–95 UEFA Cup. The stadium hosted an international between the Republic of Ireland and Wales in February 1992; the 1994 UEFA Under-16 Championships; the FAI Cup Final in 2007 and 2008; and the 2008–09 UEFA Cup match between St Patrick's Athletic and Hertha Berlin. St. Pat's also played Steaua București in the Arena on 27 August 2009 in the Play-off round of the opening season of the Europa League. The Republic of Ireland played two international friendly fixtures on 25 and 28 May 2010 against Paraguay and Algeria.

=== Other ===
In 1983, the Ireland team played in the World Group of the Davis Cup for the only time. The match against a United States team including John McEnroe was played in the RDS rather than the usual venue, Fitzwilliam, to accommodate crowds of 6,000 each day.

In 1986, the RDS was transformed into a very large ballet venue for three days of performances by the Bolshoi Ballet.

In April 2023, the Irish Poker Open was held at RDS.

=== Exams ===
The RDS hosts the University College Dublin exams before Christmas and in May/June, and Trinity College Dublin exams in April, among others.

== Awards ==
=== Boyle Medal for Scientific Excellence ===
The Boyle Medal (named after Robert Boyle (1627–1691), was inaugurated in 1899 and is awarded jointly by the RDS and the Irish Times for scientific research of exceptional merit in Ireland. By 2014 the medal had been awarded to 39 scientists.

Past recipients of the Boyle Medal:

- 2014 Seamus J. Martin
- 2011 Margaret Murnane
- 2009 Luke O'Neill
- 2005 Garret A. FitzGerald
- 2003 John McCanny
- 2001 Derek Ernest Gilmor Briggs
- 1999 Thomas Cotter
- 1996 Patrick Cunningham
- 1992 Brendan K. P. Scaife
- 1988 Peter Kevin Carroll
- 1986 James Robert McConnell
- 1982 David Allardice Webb
- 1981 Roy C. Geary
- 1979 Cormac O'Ceallaigh
- 1978 George Francis Mitchell
- 1972 John Lighton Synge
- 1971 Patrick Joseph Nolan
- 1970 Thomas J. Walsh
- 1969 Vincent C. Barry
- 1967 Edward J. Conway
- 1961 Phyllis E. M. Clinch
- 1959 Robert McKay
- 1950 Edmond J. Sheehy
- 1947 John Hewitt Jellet Poole
- 1945 Thomas J. Nolan
- 1942 Joseph Doyle
- 1939 Joseph Reilly
- 1936 Horace Hewitt Poole
- 1933 Paul A. Murphy
- 1931 Sir John Purser Griffith
- 1928 Walter Ernest Adeney
- 1928 William Ringrose Gelston Atkins
- 1921 George Herbert Pethybridge
- 1917 John Alexander McClelland
- 1916 Henry Horatio Dixon
- 1912 Sir Howard Grubb
- 1911 John Joly
- 1899 Thomas Preston
- 1899 George Johnstone Stoney

== See also ==
- IAYSG - Irish Association of Youth Science Groups
- List of organisations based in the Republic of Ireland with royal patronage
- List of tennis stadiums by capacity
