= Sarah Flannery =

Irish mathematician (born 1982)

Sarah Flannery (born 1982, County Cork, Ireland) is an Irish mathematician who was, at sixteen years old, the winner of the 1999 Esat Young Scientist Exhibition for her development of the Cayley–Purser algorithm, based on work she had done with researchers at Baltimore Technologies during a brief internship there. The project, entitled "Cryptography – A new algorithm versus the RSA", also won her the EU Young Scientist of the Year Award in 1999.

== Biography ==
Flannery's education included a primary all-girls school and secondary education at Scoil Mhuire Gan Smál in Blarney.

Following the competition win, in 2001 Flannery co-authored In Code with her father, mathematician David Flannery (1952-2023). It tells the story of the making and breaking of the Cayley-Purser algorithm, as well as the enjoyment she got from solving mathematical puzzles while growing up. She dedicates many of her accomplishments in the fields of mathematics and cryptography to her father's support during her childhood.

She studied computer science at Peterhouse, a college of the University of Cambridge, graduating in 2003, and, as of 2006, worked for Electronic Arts as a software engineer. She worked at TirNua as a "Chief Scientist". She developed the virtual economy in a game and the back-end web services that powered the game features. She has also worked at RockYou, and several other institutions involved in software development and computer science.

Before working at TirNua, Flannery was software engineer working directly with then Electronic Arts Worldwide Chief Technology Officer, Scott Cronce, and, later, with many fellow TirNua founders on her first virtual world.

At EA, she successfully set up the EA Open Source program using the Essential Project. Flannery created data visualizations on software architecture and game content creation which were used to directly impact the quality of both. She also successfully ran and turned around the virtual economy within EA-Land (formerly The Sims Online).

Previously, she worked on the technical and scientific computing software product Mathematica for Wolfram Research.

The lights on St. Patrick's Street, one of the main thoroughfares of Flannery's home city of Cork, are named after her.

Flannery is the sister of the singer and songwriter Mick Flannery.

== Bibliography ==
- (2000) Sarah Flannery and David Flannery. In Code: A Mathematical Journey 271 pages, Pub. London : Profile, ISBN 1861972229
- (2002) Sarah Flannery and David Flannery. In Code: A Mathematical Journey revised, 341 pages, Pub. Chapel Hill, N.C. : Algonquin Books of Chapel Hill, ISBN 1565123778
- Cryptography – A new algorithm versus the RSA.

== See also ==
- Intel International Science and Engineering Fair
- Linear algebra
- Cryptography
- Cayley–Purser algorithm
