= John Monahan (scientist) =

John Monahan (John James Monahan) is an Irish-born biochemist and CEO of biotechnology and gene therapy companies in the United States.

== Education ==
Monahan is from County Kildare in Ireland and was educated at Newbridge College, where he was the inaugural winner of the BT Young Scientist & Technology Exhibition in 1965, his project was an explanation of the process of digestion in the human stomach.

He holds a Bachelor of Science from University College Dublin and a PhD in Biochemistry from McMaster University in Ontario, Canada.

== Work and research ==
Monahan founded Avigen Inc in Alameda, California a company which became a leader in its sector for the development of pharmaceutical products for the treatment of serious human disease, and raised over $235 million USD through its initial public offering on the NASDAQ stock exchange.

He has directed a number of preclinical and clinical trials and led biotech and pharmaceutical research programmes.

He is current executive vice president research & development for Synthetic Biologics and sits on the scientific advisory board of Agilis Biotherapeutics, LLC.

Monahan also sits on the board of directors at IdentiGEN, the Irish-based DNA analysis company.
