= Thomas Gernon =

Irish scientist (born 1983)

Thomas M. Gernon (born 1983, County Louth, Ireland) is an academic who won the Millennium Young Scientist and Technology Exhibition (Ireland) for his work on the numerical modeling of urbanization trends in Europe. His project The Geography and Mathematics of Europe’s Urban Centres was also awarded the prestigious Alumni Prize at the 12th European Union Contest for Young Scientists. In March 2000, Gernon was honoured with "the highest form of recognition a county can bestow" – a joint civic reception from Louth County Council and Dundalk Urban District Council.

Thomas Gernon studied geology at University College Dublin graduating with First Class Honours in 2004. From September 2004 to September 2007, Gernon conducted a De Beers-funded Ph.D. on the volcanic eruption mechanisms of diamond-bearing rocks at the Department of Earth Sciences, University of Bristol. The dissertation, The dynamics of degassing and explosive volcanism in kimberlite pipes, involved experimental work on the gas-fluidization of particles and fieldwork at Jwaneng Diamond Mine in the Kalahari Desert, Botswana, and the De Beers Venetia Mine on the South Africa–Zimbabwe border. His work on the internal structure of volcanoes also takes him to many active volcanoes around the world, including those of Iceland, Italy, Greece, and the Kamchatka Peninsula in the Russian Far East. Gernon is currently lecturer in geology at the University of Southampton.

== See also ==
- Young Scientist and Technology Exhibition (Ireland)
