= Young Scientist and Technology Exhibition =

Irish annual school students' science competition

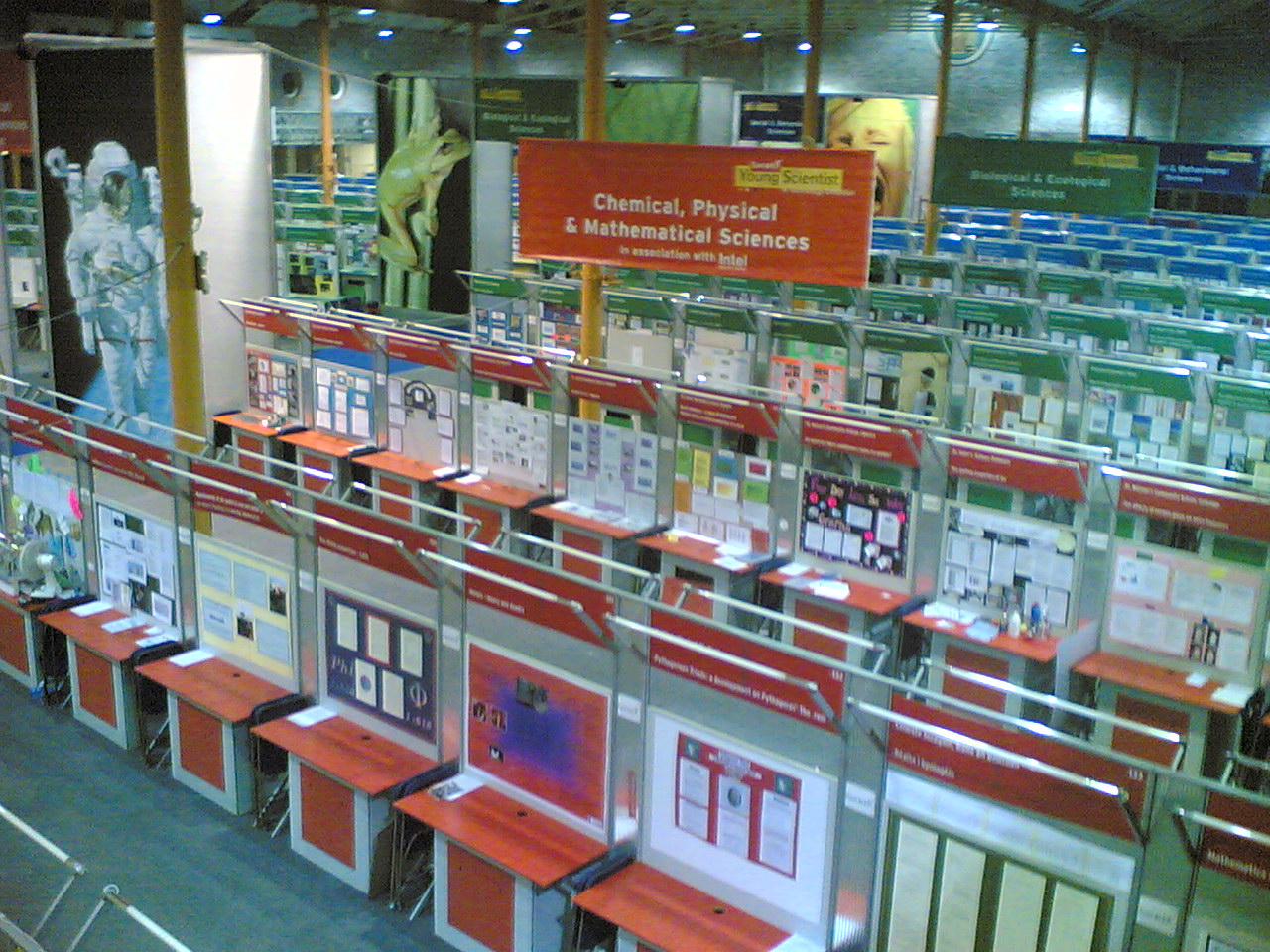
- Exhibition stands in 2005
- Nickname: YSTE
- Genre: Students' science competition and exhibition
- Frequency: Early January annually
- Venue: Royal Dublin Society
- Location: Dublin
- Coordinates: 53°19′36″N 6°13′43″W
- Country: Ireland
- Inaugurated: 6 January 1965; 61 years ago
- Founders: Tom Burke; Tony Scott
- Previous event: January 2025
- Next event: January 2026
- Participants: 4,000+ students from 352 schools (2025)
- People: John Monahan (inaugural winner)
- Sponsor: Stripe (2026–present); BT Ireland (2000–2025); Aer Lingus (1965–1998)
- Website: stripeyste.com

The Stripe Young Scientist and Technology Exhibition, commonly called the Young Scientist Exhibition, is an Irish annual school students' science competition that has been held in the Royal Dublin Society, Dublin, Ireland, every January since the competition was founded by Tom Burke and Tony Scott in 1965.

The Young Scientist & Technology Exhibition (YSTE) is run under the guidance and ownership of a charity by the same name. It is governed by a Board of Directors and was founded in 2003 to protect and promote the YSTE.

The vision of the charity is, "To be recognised globally for generating excitement in young people about the power of science and its ability to improve our world."

== The competition ==
The purpose of the competition is to encourage interest in science in secondary schools. For the 51st year of the competition in 2016, there were over 2,000 entries, from 396 schools which was the highest number ever, 550 of which were selected for the Exhibition at the RDS.

Students apply to participate in the competition. Their science project entries are evaluated by judges and about one-third of applicants are accepted to participate in the public exhibition. Students are allocated exhibition stands in an exhibition hall where they set up their projects for viewing by the public. Competing projects are judged during the three days of the exhibition, and prizes are awarded.

Projects are awarded in five categories: biology, physics, social and behavioural sciences, health and wellbeing, and technology. Health and wellbeing is the newest category, only being added in 2023 to celebrate the 60th anniversary and to lower admissions to social and behavioural sciences. Three levels of entry are accepted: junior, intermediate, and senior. In each category three main prizes are awarded; other prizes include a display award, highly commended rosettes, and a cancer awareness award. The winners of the BT Young Scientist and Technology Exhibition advance to participate in prestigious international events such as the European Union Contest for Young Scientists.

John Monahan was the inaugural winner of the Young Scientist Exhibition in 1965; then a student of Newbridge College, his project was an explanation of the process of digestion in the human stomach. He went on to establish a NASDAQ-listed biotech company in California after attending University College Dublin.

Aer Lingus sponsored the competition for the first 33 years. 2021 marked the 21st year in which the Exhibition was sponsored by BT Ireland. It has produced at least one author, Sarah Flannery, and one billionaire, Patrick Collison. Many of the past winners have gone on to establish international companies in the technology they developed. One of the most notable was Baltimore Technologies.

Tom Burke, who co-founded the exhibition with physicist Tony Scott, died in March 2008. An award at the event (a bursary offered to individual participants) was named in his memory.

Due to the COVID-19 pandemic, the first ever virtual Young Scientist & Technology Exhibition was held in January 2021 with over 1,000 students representing more than 200 schools taking part.

On 11 February 2025, BT Ireland announced it would step down as organiser and sponsor of the Young Scientist and Technology Exhibition after 25 years. In May 2025, Stripe was announced as the new title sponsor of the Young Scientist and Technology Exhibition, 20 years after co-founder Patrick Collison won the competition.

== Overall winners by year ==
| Year | Winner | Age | School | Project title | Notes |
|---|---|---|---|---|---|
| 1965 | John Monahan | | Newbridge College, County Kildare | An apparatus to demonstrate and examine the various chemical reactions that take place in the human body during digestion and to examine the effects of abnormal conditions | Education: Biochemistry at UCD. PhD in biochemistry from McMaster University, Ontario.; Where is he now? Vice-president, research and development at the cutting edge Synthetic Biologics, California. |
| 1966 | Máire Caitríona Ní Dhomhnaill | | Ursuline Convent, Sligo | The "four colour problem" in topology. An attempt to form a proof or partial proof of this problem and to extend the proof to cover other surfaces | Education: BSc in physics and mathematics at UCC.; Where is she now? Science teacher at Dublin school |
| 1967 | Walter Hayes | | St Vincent's CBS, Glasnevin, Dublin | Salmonellis in Mice: A study of etiology, course and effect of the disease on the host | Education: Languages at TCD.; Where is he now? Teaching English in Africa. |
| 1968 | George Andrew Reynolds | | St James' CBS, Dublin | To determine the extent and nature of mineralisation in the iron-manganese lode at Cloghleagh, Co. Wicklow, by means of electrical resistance, geo-resistivity and natural current surveys | Project: 'Geophysical study of an iron mine'; Education: Earth sciences at TCD; Masters in geophysics Dublin Institute for Advanced Studies; earth sciences degree in Spain; MBA degree.; Where is he now? Management consulting in Ireland. |
| 1969 | Luke Drury | | Wesley College, Dublin | The construction and use of a spectro-photometer to investigate complex ion formation in a transition metal | Project: 'Construction and use of a spectro-photometer to investigate complex ion formation in a transitional metal'; Education: BSc in physics at TCD; PhD in astrophysics from Cambridge.; Where is he now? Astrophysicist at Max Planck Institute of Nuclear Physics, Germany. |
| 1970 | Maria Edgeworth | | Convent of Mercy, Longford | To extract pigments from various flowers and investigate their possible practical use | Education: BSc in physics from TCD; diploma in international studies from Nice.; Where is she now? Set up Government Equine Diagnostic Laboratory at Coolmore Stud, Co Tipperary; working as a biochemist. |
| 1971 | Peter Short | | Presentation Convent, Clane, County Kildare | A survey of Lough Bollard, near Clane, to determine its history and the reason for its disappearance in the 18th century | Where is he now? Set up his own company, Pharma Buy. |
| 1972 | Seán Mac Fheorais | | Coláiste Mhuire, Baile Atha Cliath | Grinn- staidéar ar pterostigmata | Education: BSc in biochemistry from Dundee University.; Where is he now? Unilever Laboratories in Cheshire, England. |
| 1973 | Tadhg Begley | | North Monastery CBS, Cork | A painstaking search for minerals and pollutants in water samples collected in jars over a number of years from the sea off Youghal | Education: BSc in chemistry from UCC; PhD in organic chemistry from California Institute of Technology; University of Geneva; and MIT.; Where is he now? Associate professor of chemistry at Cornell University. |
| 1974 | Richard Elliott | | Portora Royal School, Enniskillen, County Fermanagh | The use of computer techniques to provide mathematical models of biological situations | Education: Trained as a surgeon in Edinburgh; cardiothoracic surgery; occupational toxicology.; Where is he now? Epidemiologist at HSE medical sciences unit in Liverpool. |
| 1975 | Noel Boyle | | St Finian's College, Mullingar, County Westmeath | A study of photoelectric cells and construction of a spectrophotometer | Education: BA and MB from Trinity College Dublin; research at St James's Hospital, Dublin.; Where is he now? Professor of medicine at UCLA in California. |
| 1976 | Mary Kelly-Quinn | | Our Lady's Secondary School, Castleblayney, County Monaghan | To the existence of minerals by means of analyzing rock slides; to carry out a geophysical survey aimed at verifying direction and depth of veins and mineral outcrops | Education: Degree, PhD and post-doctoral research in zoology at UCD and TCD.; Where is she now? UCD lecturer in Department of Zoology. |
| 1977 | Micheal Og O'Briain | | Colaiste Mhuire, Dublin | An integrated study of the scientific conservation of Rogerstown Estuary, County Dublin | Education: BSc in zoology from UCD; co-organised and took part in three Irish Brent Goose Expeditions to Arctic.; Where is he now? Appointed to Environmental Directorate of the European Community. |
| 1978 | Donald McDonnell | | Crescent College Comp, Dooradoyle, Limerick | A study of effect of proven pollution on ecological balance in the Shannon at Limerick | McDonnell received a degree in biochemistry from UCG (now NUIG) in 1983. He then left Ireland and moved to Houston where he did a PhD in cell biology under the mentorship of Bert O'Malley at Baylor College of Medicine. His thesis, which involved the molecular cloning of receptors for steroid hormone receptors, brought him into the field of drug discovery. Following his fellowship training he left academics for a while and worked as head of molecular biology at Ligand Pharmaceuticals, a biopharmaceutical company in San Diego. In 1994 he moved back to academics and is now the Glaxo-Wellcome professor of molecular cancer biology at Duke University |
| 1979 | Jervis Good | | Midleton College, County Cork | The concept of Ecopolemiology as Illustrated by a Preliminary Study of the Bionomics of the Earwig | Education: Won the YS after dropping out of school with Leaving Cert; graduated from Trinity with BSc and then PhD from UCC in zoology.; Where is he now? Freelance environmental consultant. |
| 1980 | Karen Ruddock | | Alexandra College, Milltown, Dublin | Lichens in relation to their environment | Education: BSc in natural sciences from Trinity; HDip in education; Masters in applied linguistics.; Where is she now? Director of PPLI, implementing key actions in Languages Connect: Ireland's Foreign Languages Strategy in Education. |
| 1981 | Catherine Conlon | | Muckross Park, Dublin | A study of physical, biochemical and anatomical aspects of the spider and its web, and its adaptation to its environment | Education: Degree in medicine from UCD; Masters in public health from UCD.; Where is she now? Public health lecturer. |
| 1982 | Martynn Sheehan | | Convent of Mercy, Moate, County Westmeath | Lichens may be used for medicine | Education: BSc from UCG.; Where is she now? Validation manager with Elan Corporation, Athlone, Co Westmeath. |
| 1983 | Turan Mirza, William Murphy & Gareth Clarke | 17/18/17 | Carrickfergus Grammar School, Carrickfergus, County Antrim | Microcomputer Based Robotics | The first group to win the Young Scientist Exhibition. They represented Ireland in Copenhagen, Denmark at the European Young Scientists.: Education: William studied computer science at University of Ulster. Gareth completed education in technology degree from Queen's University, Belfast.; Where are they now? William is an IT consultant. Gareth teaches computers and technology in Canada. |
| 1984 | Eoin Walsh | | Colaiste Choilm CBS, Swords, County Dublin | Simulation of Drude Electron Theory and Kinetic Theory of Gases | Education: Experimental physics from Trinity; post-graduate research at TCD.; Where is he now? Vice president of Morgan Stanley bank. |
| 1985 | Ronan McNulty | | St Mary's College, Rathmines, Dublin | The Musical Typewriter (A system which prints music as you play) | Education: Mathematical and experimental physics at UCD; PhD in particle physics at University of Liverpool.: Where is he now? Physics lecturer at UCD. |
| 1986 | Niamh Mulvany & Breda Maguire | 17/17 | Rosary College, Raheny, Dublin | Focus on the Viola tricolor - an Indepth study on Bull Island | Mulvany and Maguire went on to win a top award for Ireland at the Philips European competition for Young Scientists and Inventors in Oslo in May 1986. They were presented to King Carl Gustaf and Queen Silvia of Sweden at the Nobel Ball later in 1986. Both went on to graduate from Trinity College Dublin with degrees in natural sciences, specialising in botany.: Where are they now? Breda is business manager with Smiths Medical, Co Dublin. Niamh is working to complete homeopathy qualification. |
| 1987 | Henry Byrne & Emma Donnellan | | FCJ Secondary School, Bunclody, County Wexford | Fibre Optic Liquid Analyser | Education: Henry studied mechanical and manufacturing engineering at Trinity. Emma attained a master's degree in marketing.; Where are they now? Henry is development manager for Roadstone Provinces. Emma is global consumer planner with Diageo. |
| 1988 | Siobhan Lanigan O'Keeffe | | Navan Community College, County Meath | Geothermal Study of the River Skane | Education: Where is she now? Working with Ulster Wildlife. |
| 1989 | Grace O'Connor and Sinéad Finn | | Ursuline College, Thurles, County Tipperary | A Study on a Crop Fractation Industry | Education: Grace did a masters in medical oncology at University of Manchester; pharmacy degree in Sunderland. Sinead studied Italian and history at UCD.; Where are they now? Grace is a pharmacist in Dublin. |
| 1990 | Anna Minchin-Dalton | | Alexandra College, Milltown, Dublin | Studies of the Oyster Thief | Education: BSc in rural resource development from Anglia Polytechnic University; masters from University of Reading.; Where is she now? Working as a marine biologist. |
| 1991 | Daniel Dundas and Barry O'Doherty | | St. Patrick's College, Maghera, County Londonderry | Dynamics of a Two-Well Potential Oscillator | Education: BSc in physics with astrophysics from Queen's University Belfast; MSc in opto-electronics and optical information processing; PGCE in physics with science. Daniel received a PhD in theoretical physics from Queen's University Belfast.; Where are they now? Barry is teaching in Belfast. |
| 1992 | Elizabeth Dowling & Jean Byrne | | St Paul's Secondary School, Greenhills, Dublin | A Picture Winged Insect. Population Dynamics of a Thistle Predator Terellia Serratulae | Education: Elizabeth studied science at Tallaght RTC. Jean studied science at Trinity; masters in environmental resource management at UCD.; Where are they now? Elizabeth works for FBD Insurance. Jean works as a remote sensing specialist at Era Maptec in Dublin. |
| 1993 | Donal Keane & Rodger Toner | | Abbey Grammar School, Newry, County Down | Assessment of Female Quality by Male Gammarus | Education: Donal studied aeronautics at Imperial College, London; finance at Queen's University Belfast. Rodger studied medicine in London.; Where are they now? Donal works for financial software consultancy firm First Derivatives. Rodger is a doctor in London. |
| 1994 | Jane Feehan | | St Brendan's Community School, Birr, County Offaly | The Secret Life of the Calluna Case-Carrier | Education: Biological sciences at Oxford; attained PhD from TCD.; Where is she now? Working with Irish Environmental Protection Agency and European Environment Agency, Denmark. |
| 1995 | Brian Fitzpatrick and Shane Markey | | Abbey Grammar School, Newry | Factors Affecting Cavitation in Whole Plants, Leaves and Vascular Bundles using Acoustic Detection | Education: Brian studied medicine at TCD. Shane studied dentistry.; Where are they now? Brian works at Altnagelvin Hospital, Derry. Shane is a dentist in New York. |
| 1996 | Elsie O'Sullivan, Rowens Mooney, Patricia Lyne | | Scoil Mhuire, Portarlington, County Laois | The Perfect Queen Bee | Education: Elsie qualified as a vet from UCD. Rowena studied business management at DIT. Patricia received a commerce degree and masters in accountancy from UCD.; Where are they now? Elsie is a vet. Rowena works for Ryanair. Patricia is works for KPMG. |
| 1997 | Ciara McGoldrick, Emma McQuillan, Fiona Fraser | 17 | Dominican College, Belfast | The preservation of Biological Data in European Bog Bodies. | Education: Ciara attained degrees in pathology and medicine at Queen's University Belfast. Emma completed degrees in forensic medicine and medicine from Dundee University. Fiona studied midwifery at University of Melbourne.; Where are they now? Ciara is a registrar in plastic surgery in Ulster Hospital Belfast. Fiona works in biomedical engineering. |
| 1998 | Raphael Hurley | 15 | Coláiste an Spioraid Naoimh, Bishopstown, Cork | The Mathematics of Monopoly | Gained a BSc (Hons) joint honours in mathematics and applied mathematics from University College Cork in 2005; Was named UCC Graduate of the Year in February 2006 |
| 1999 | Sarah Flannery | 16 | Scoil Mhuire Gan Smál, Blarney, County Cork | Cryptography – A new algorithm versus the RSA | Wrote a book on her algorithm and number theory in general, In Code: A Mathematical Journey (ISBN 0-7611-2384-9); First place – 11th European Union Contest for Young Scientists; Gained a BA in computer science from the University of Cambridge in 2003, worked for Wolfram Research for a period and in 2006 was working with the EA software company in California, United States |
| 2000 | Thomas Gernon | 16 | Coláiste Rís, Dundalk, County Louth | The Geography and Mathematics of Europe's Urban Centres | First time in the competition's 36-year history that a social and behavioural sciences project won the top award Graduated with first class honours in geology from University College Dublin in 2004, going on to complete a PhD at the Department of Earth Sciences, University of Bristol; His research on the dynamics of volcanic eruptions has taken him from diamond mines in Botswana and Arctic Canada, to many active volcanoes around the world, including those of Iceland, Italy, Greece and Far Eastern Siberia; Currently lecturer of geology at Trinity College Dublin |
| 2001 | Peter Taylor, Shane Browne and Michael O'Toole | — | St. Kilian's Community School, Ballywaltrim, Bray, County Wicklow | Investigating symmetrical shapes formed by polygons | |
| 2002 | David Michael O'Doherty | — | Gonzaga College, Ranelagh, Dublin | The Distribution of the Primes and the Underlying Order to Chaos. | Mathematics undergraduate at Cambridge |
| 2003 | Adnan Osmani | 16 | St Finian's College, Mullingar, County Westmeath | The graphical technological and user-friendly advancement of the Internet browser: XWebs | Osmani filed for a patent for his networking socket and web browser in 2003. He graduated with a BSc in software engineering from Sheffield Hallam University, a masters in software engineering from Warwick University and certificates in security from Oxford University. He has since written books on JavaScript development for O'Reilly and now works as an engineer at Google. |
| 2004 | Ronan Larkin | 16 | Synge Street CBS, Dublin | Generalised Continued Fractions | Mentored by Jim Cooke |
| 2005 | Patrick Collison | 16 | Castletroy College, Limerick | Croma: a new dialect of Lisp | Became an overnight millionaire at the age of 19 when he, alongside his 17-year-old brother John, sold their software company Auctomatic to a Canadian firm for more than €3 million. They then went on to found the company Stripe. As of 2017 Collison is the CEO of the company and owns a stake worth US$1.1 billion. |
| 2006 | Aisling Judge | 14 | Kinsale Community School, County Cork | The development and evaluation of a biological food spoilage indicator | Third place – 18th European Union Contest for Young Scientists; First Junior Category Winner |
| 2007 | Abdusalam Abubakar | 17 | Synge Street CBS, Dublin | An Extension of Wiener's Attack on RSA | First place – 19th European Union Contest for Young Scientists; Originally from Somalia, had not used a computer before arriving in Ireland twenty months earlier. Mentored by Jim Cooke |
| 2008 | Emer Jones | 13 | Presentation Secondary School, Tralee, County Kerry | Research and Development of Emergency Sandbag Shelters | Youngest ever winner First winner from County Kerry; First time her school had entered |
| 2009 | Liam McCarthy and John D. O'Callaghan | 13/14 | Kinsale Community School, County Cork | The Development of a Convenient Test Method for Somatic Cell Count and Its Importance in Milk Production | Kinsale Community School became the first to simultaneously hold two separate national award winners after Aisling Judge's 2006 win. First place – 21st European Union Contest for Young Scientists |
| 2010 | Richard O'Shea | 18 | Scoil Mhuire Gan Smál, Blarney, County Cork | A biomass fired cooking stove for developing countries | |
| 2011 | Alexander Amini | 15 | Castleknock College, Dublin | Tennis sensor data analysis | |
| 2012 | Mark Kelly and Eric Doyle | 17/17 | Synge Street CBS, Dublin | Simulation accuracy in the gravitational many-body problem | Synge Street CBS win the overall award for a then unparalleled three times First place – 24th European Union Contest for Young Scientists in Bratislava |
| 2013 | Emer Hickey, Sophie Healy-Thow and Ciara Judge | 15/15/15 | Kinsale Community School, County Cork | A statistical investigation of the effects of Diazotroph bacteria on plant germination. | Third time in seven years Kinsale Community School had won the competition, thereby matching Synge Street CBS for most wins. The girls went on take first prize at the EU Contest for Young Scientists in Prague in September 2013 and win the grand prize in the 2014 Google Science Fair in California. |
| 2014 | Paul Clarke | 17 | St Paul's College, Raheny, Dublin | Contributions to cyclic graph theory. | This is the second time the school has won the event. |
| 2015 | Ian O'Sullivan and Eimear Murphy | 16/16 | Coláiste Treasa, Kanturk, County Cork | Alcohol consumption: Does the apple fall far from the tree? | |
| 2016 | Maria Louise Fufezan and Diana Bura | 16/15 | Loreto Balbriggan, Balbriggan, County Dublin | An Investigation into the Effects of Enzymes used in Animal Feed Additives on the Lifespan of Caenorhabditis Elegans | |
| 2017 | Shane Curran | 16 | Terenure College, Terenure, Dublin | qCrypt: The quantum-secure, encrypted, data storage platform with multijurisdictional quorum sharding technology | This is the first time the school has won the event. Shane is now founder and CEO of his own company Evervault which was founded on work he did on his BTYSTE winning project. |
| 2018 | Simon Meehan | 15 | Coláiste Choilm, Ballincollig, Cork | Investigation of the antimicrobial effects of both aerial and root parts of selected plants against Staphylococcus aureus. | |
| 2019 | Adam Kelly | 17 | Skerries Community College, County Dublin | Optimizing The Simulation of General Quantum Circuits | First time this school has won the BT Young Scientist |
| 2020 | Cormac Harris and Alan O'Sullivan | 16/16 | Coláiste Choilm, Ballincollig, Cork | A statistical investigation into the prevalence of gender stereotyping in 5-7 year olds and the development of an initiative to combat gender bias | Harris and O'Sullivan won first place at the 31st edition of EUCYS. |
| 2021 | Greg Tarr | 17 | Bandon Grammar School, County Cork | Detecting state-of-the-art deepfakes | Greg won 2nd place at the 32nd edition of EUCYS. Tarr has since launched his own company Inferex. |
| 2022 | Aditya Kumar and Aditya Joshi | 15/15 | Synge Street CBS, Dublin | A New Method of Solving the Bernoulli Quadrisection Problem | 4th time the school has won top prize.Kumar & Joshi won 1st place at the 33rd edition of EUCYS. |
| 2023 | Shane O'Connor and Liam Carew | 18/18 | The Abbey School, Tipperary | Assessing the impact of second-level education on key aspects of adolescents' life and development | Shane and Liam won 2nd place at the 35th edition of EUCYS. |
| 2024 | Seán O'Sullivan | 17 | Coláiste Chiaráin, County Limerick | VerifyMe: A new approach to authors attribution in the post-ChatGPT era | First time this school has won. Sean won 2nd place at EUCYS |
| 2025 | Laoise, Saoirse and Ciara Murphy | 12/15/17 | Presentation Secondary School, Tralee, County Kerry | ACT {Aid Care Treat}: App-timising emergency response. A technological aid, featuring a comprehensive repository of medical information – iterative development. | First time siblings have won together. The Group contains the youngest ever winner of the competition (Laoise, 12). Second time the school has won the top prize. Second winners from County Kerry. |
| 2026 | Aoibheann Daly | 15 | Mercy Secondary School Mounthawk, Tralee, Co. Kerry | GlioScope: Multi‑task Deep Learning and Causal AI for Glioma & Glioblastoma Profiling | Third winner from County Kerry and first solo female winner since 2008 |

== Winners by age ==
The youngest winners are listed first.

| Age | Winner | School | Project title | Year |
|---|---|---|---|---|
| 12 | Laoise Murphy (with Saoirse (15) & Ciara (17) Murphy) | Presentation Secondary School, Tralee, County Kerry | ACT {Aid Care Treat}: App-timising emergency response. A technological aid, featuring a comprehensive repository of medical information – iterative development. | 2025 |
| 13 | Emer Jones | Presentation Secondary School, Tralee, County Kerry | Research and Development of Emergency Sandbag Shelters | 2008 |
| 13/14 | Liam McCarthy and John D. O'Callaghan | Kinsale Community School, County Cork | The Development of a Convenient Test Method for Somatic cell count and Its Importance in Milk Production | 2009 |
| 14 | Aisling Judge | Kinsale Community School, County Cork | The development and evaluation of a biological food spoilage indicator | 2006 |

== See also ==
- Education in the Republic of Ireland
- Science Week Ireland
