= Baltimore Technologies =

Irish IT firm

Baltimore Technologies, plc
- Type: Public
- Founded: Dublin, Ireland (1976)
- Headquarters: Dublin, Ireland
- Products: Cryptographic toolkits Public Key Infrastructure solutions Secure email/web/e-commerce products
- Number of employees: 12 (2006)
- Parent: Oryx International Growth Fund

Baltimore Technologies was a leading Irish internet security firm, with its headquarters in Dublin, Ireland. It was listed on the London Stock Exchange and was briefly part of the FTSE 100 Index during 2000.

== History ==
The company was founded in 1976 by mathematician Michael Purser. Before the 1990s, the company had focused on consultancy for telecoms companies and also took part in European research projects. Around this time, Pat Cremin took over as managing director from Jim Mountjoy and began developing products like the Crypto Systems Toolbox, based on Purser's interests in cryptography.

Baltimore was acquired in 1996 by a team financed by Dermot Desmond and led by Fran Rooney. In December 1998 it was further acquired by Zergo Limited, a UK company listed on the London Stock Exchange. Post-acquisition, Zergo changed its name to Baltimore Technologies and Fran Rooney was appointed CEO of the merged company. Under Rooney's leadership, Baltimore expanded rapidly, both through organic growth and by a series of high-profile acquisitions.

In 1999 the company was listed on NASDAQ and the share price soared in value during the internet boom as its digital certificate business was seen as a vital tool to enable e-Commerce. The company showed considerable growth in both sales and market capitalisation, becoming a FTSE 100 firm with a market capitalization of over US$13 billion. However, following the stock market crash of March 2000, its share price fell. Rooney resigned as CEO in July 2001 and a bidding war for the Company ensued.

Bijan Khezri, a former director of Baltimore Technologies in charge of capital markets finance, who had left the company over disagreements with Fran Rooney in 2000, was appointed CEO. The new management team sold off the different business units in a series of demergers and by December 2003, following the sale of the PKI business to Betrusted and the authentication business to Hewlett Packard, the company was left with nothing but a cash shell.

In March 2004 the board announced its intention to move into the clean energy business. The plan was abandoned in June 2004 when vulture fund Acquisitor Holdings of Bermuda acquired sufficient shares to take control of the cash. In February 2005 Acquisitor delisted Baltimore from the London Stock Exchange and the various parties within Acquisitor split. The company listed on the Alternative Investment Market at the end of February 2006 under the symbol BLM. In May 2006, the company released an AGM statement which described its strategy as "becoming a financial services business concentrating on those specialist areas of the market where we have the skills and track record to obtain an operational multiple on the valuation of our shares." The company was acquired by Oryx International Growth Fund in July 2006.

== Young Scientist ==
Sarah Flannery won the European Young Scientist of the Year award for her presentation of the Cayley–Purser algorithm, which was based on work she performed with Baltimore researchers during a short internship with the company. The algorithm was named by Flannery after Arthur Cayley and Baltimore founder, Michael Purser.

== Media coverage ==
Fran Rooney was the subject of considerable media interest both in Europe and the US and was the subject of an RTÉ documentary in the Raging Bulls series, first broadcast on October 17, 2006.
