= David McWalter =

Scottish footballer (1891–1918)

Personal information
- Date of birth: 1891
- Place of birth: Luncarty, Scotland
- Date of death: 2 February 1918 (aged 27)
- Place of death: Salonika, Kingdom of Greece
- Position: Outside right

Senior career*
Years	Team	Apps	(Gls)
–1912	Luncarty		
1912–1914	St Johnstone	49	(14)
- * Club domestic league appearances and goals

David McWalter (1891 – 2 February 1918) was a Scottish professional footballer who played in the Scottish League for St Johnstone as an outside right.

== Personal life ==
McWalter served as a gunner in the Royal Field Artillery during the First World War and was killed in action during the Salonika Campaign on 2 February 1918. He was buried in Sarigol Military Cemetery, near Kristoni, Greece.
