= Tom Burke (priest) =

Irish Carmelite priest, physicist and school teacher (1923–2008)

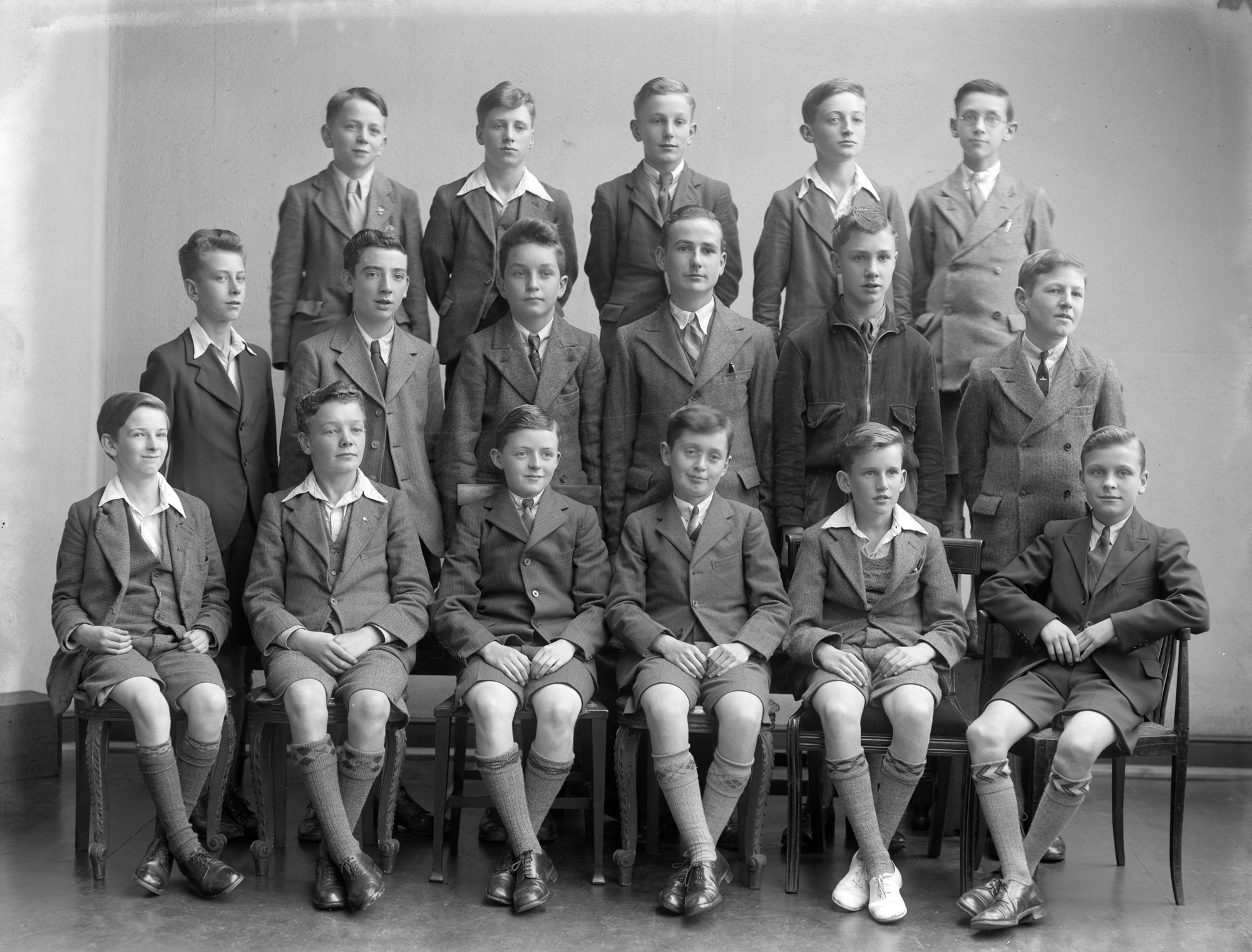
Synge Street pupils, c.1941. Patrick (Thomas) Burke is pictured

Patrick Thomas Burke (1923 – 30 March 2008) was an Irish Carmelite priest, physicist and school teacher, and co-founder of the Young Scientist Exhibition.

Burke was born 4 November 1923. He was educated in Synge Street Christian Brothers School in Dublin. He joined the Carmelites, and studied in University College Dublin, earning a Degree (1945), Masters (1947) and Doctorate (1949). He studied in Milltown Park earning a Theology degree and licentiate. Ordained in 1951, he also gained a Higher Diploma in Education in 1953.

Burke taught Mathematics and Physics at St. Patrick's College, Maynooth, before teaching Mathematics at Terenure College in Dublin, where he also served as Prior and Headmaster. He joined the Physics department at UCD.

He co-founded with Dr Tony Scott his former pupil in Terenure College the Young Scientist and Technology Exhibition in 1965, they came up with the idea while working in New Mexico in 1963. In 2007, they were awarded honorary doctorates by Dublin Institute of Technology in recognition of their promotion of science.

Burke died on 30 March 2008.
