= Kinsale Community School =

Location
- Kinsale, County Cork; Ireland
- Coordinates: 51.7043°N 8.5295°W

Information
- Motto: Omnes Communiter Discendo
- Established: 1996
- Principal: Fergal McCarthy
- Staff: ~160
- Age: 12 to 18
- Enrollment: ~1550
- Colour: Light blue Yellow
- Nickname: KCS
- Website: https://www.kinsalecommunityschool.ie/

Kinsale Community School is based in the town of Kinsale, County Cork, Ireland. It caters for around 1,550 students aged 12–18 with around 160 staff and the principal is currently Mr. Fergal McCarthy.

== History ==
Kinsale Community School officially began on 1 August 1996, following the amalgamation of two schools, "Our Lady of the Rosary Secondary School" and "Kinsale Vocational School" with 500 students. The school motto, "Omnes Communiter Discendo" adopted by the first Board of Management, states that we are "All Together in Learning". The school has become known for the successes in the Young Scientist, the Google Science Fair and the European young scientist. However the school is also a strong centre for the students interested in other extra curricular activities.

== Development ==
As of 2013, the school was undergoing an expansion and renovation programme to extend the capacity to an estimated 1,000 students. This was undertaken to cater for an expanding catchment area, and included the development of additional classrooms, a sports hall and canteen. As of 2020, this expansion had been completed.

== Academic ==
The school operates Junior Certificate, Transition Year, Leaving Certificate Applied, and Leaving Certificate courses.

== Young Scientist Exhibition ==
The school first started attending the BT Young Scientist and Technology Exhibition in 2002 with a single project and since then has grown to become the leading school in the competition both in number of entrants and awards. Over the past 14 years there have been 180 students from the school displaying at the exhibition and the roll of honour for awards stretches across all categories.

Kinsale is one of only two schools to have won the competition outright three times and is the only school in the country to have more than one set of "Young Scientists" studying there at the same time. The school has received the "Best School in the Republic of Ireland" award three times, in 2012, 2014 and 2020. In addition to the three overall awards, the school has twice had students awarded the Overall Best Group and Overall Runner-up Group. They have also accumulated dozens of category awards and a selection of special prizes.

In 2014, the school had 47 students attending with 25 projects on show. This was the largest group from any school across the country and received nine main awards and an additional seven "highly commended"s. Such was the success of the school that during the awards ceremony Ruairí Quinn, Irish Minister for Education, asked the question "Is Kinsale a place or just a state of mind?".

== Notable alumni ==
- Aisling Judge
- Ciara Judge
- SEARLS
