= Tony Scott (physicist) =

Irish physicist and science communicator

John Anthony "Tony" Scott is an Irish physicist and science communicator. He co-founded with Tom Burke (his former teacher in Terenure College) the Young Scientist and Technology Exhibition in 1963.

He studied physics at University College Dublin, earning BSc, MSc, and (in 1966) PhD (under Patrick Nolan), before joining the academic staff for four decades.

In 1999 he won the Institute of Physics Kelvin Medal and Prize.

In 2007 Scott along with Burke were awarded honorary doctorates by Dublin Institute of Technology in recognition of their promotion of science with the creation of the Young Scientist Exhibition.

In 2012 Scott won the 'People of the Year Award', "for his immense contribution to the field of science in Ireland and co-founding of what is today known as the Young Scientist Exhibition." In 2018, Trinity College Dublin bestowed an honorary D.Ed degree on him.
