= Patrick McWalter =

Irish footballer (born 1984)

Pat McWalter
Personal information
- Full name: Patrick McWalter
- Date of birth: 6 January 1984 (age 42)
- Place of birth: Wicklow, Ireland
- Height: 1.78 m (5 ft 10 in)
- Position: Winger

Senior career*
Years	Team	Apps	(Gls)
2003–2008	UCD	144	(22)
- * Club domestic league appearances and goals

Patrick "Padge" McWalter (born 6 January 1984) is an Irish former association footballer who played with League of Ireland side UCD.

== Association football career ==
In his spell at UCD McWalter's versatility has been put to use seeing him deployed in a number of positions at left wing, right wing and up front. Though not prolific in his role as striker he finished as UCD's top scorer in the league in 2005. He also had the misfortune of scoring an own goal in UCD's League Cup final defeat to Derry City that year. McWalter picked up a serious cruciate knee ligament injury at the end of the 2006 season and spent most of the 2007 season recovering. He managed to stage a comeback a few months before the season's end and began the 2008 season as UCD's first choice left winger.

McWalter left UCD at the end of the 2008 season to concentrate solely on playing Gaelic football for the Wicklow county team.

== GAA career ==
McWalter played an instrumental role in his club St Patrick's run to the county football final of 2008. Lining out at centre back in the final, his team were defeated but McWalter picked up the man of the match accolade. As a result of these performances, he was called up to the senior panel for 2009. His impact was immediate and he played a starring role in Wicklow's championship run to the last 12 of the All-Ireland series. His form continued into 2010 and while he was having a great game against Carlow in a Leinster Championship game. He suffered a serious injury to his kneecap which will see him out of action for some time.

== Later life ==
He taught in Blackrock College for the year of 2008–09. He taught History and Geography and left the school after one year. He teaches in Avondale Community College in Rathdrum.

== Career statistics ==
Appearances and goals by club, season and competition
Club	Season	League			FAI Cup		League of Ireland Cup		Total	
Club	Season	Division	Apps	Goals	Apps	Goals	Apps	Goals	Apps	Goals
UCD	2003	League of Ireland	13	1	1	0	0	0	14	1
UCD	2004	League of Ireland	29	7	3	1	2	0	34	8
UCD	2005	League of Ireland	33	7	4	2	3	0	40	9
UCD	2006	League of Ireland	25	4	3	1	0	0	28	5
UCD	2007	League of Ireland	11	1	2	0	1	0	14	1
UCD	2008	League of Ireland	33	2	2	0	0	0	35	2
UCD	Total		144	22	14	4	6	0	164	26
