= European Union Contest for Young Scientists =

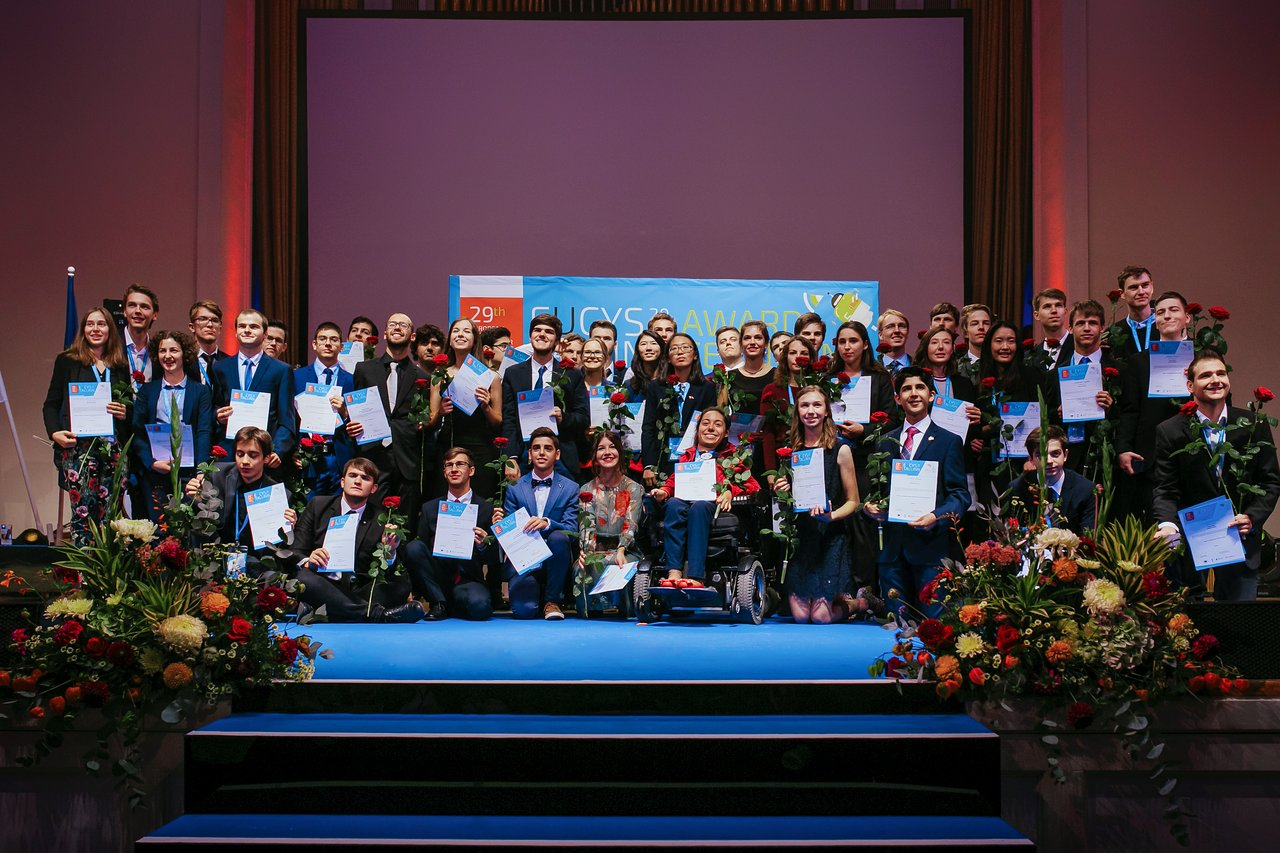
Winners 2017 in Tallinn, Estonia

The European Union (EU) Contest for Young Scientists is a science fair, initiated by the European Commission. It is a part of the European Union Framework Programmes for Research and Technological Development, and is managed by the Directorate General for Research in the European Commission.

The EU Contest was set up to promote the ideals of cooperation and interchange between young scientists. It provides an annual showcase of the best of European student scientific achievement and such attracts widespread media interest. The EU Contest is hosted annually in a different European country. Every year a new local host organisation co-operates with the European Commission to organise the event.

The EU Contest was initiated in 1989 when European Commission president Jacques Delors took up the challenge from Royal Philips Electronics of the Netherlands of organising the Europe-wide student science fair. Philips has organised this annual event since 1968, but felt the time had come for the European Union to take on the organisation after 20 successful Philips Contests.

In addition to multiple days in the exhibit hall for judging, competitors travel to various science museums and attractions in the host city. Winners of the contest participate in a press conference after the awards ceremony.

== Venues for the EU Contest for Young Scientists ==
- 1st: Brussels, Belgium 1989
  - First Prize Winners (6): Mogens Markussen (DK), Stephan Schlitter (DE), Grace O'Connor/Sinead Finn (IE), Lina Tomasella (IT), Nicola Kirk (UK) and Jean-Pierre Wyss/Matthias Zimmermann/Elmar Artho (CH)
- 2nd: Copenhagen, Denmark 1990
  - First Prize Winners (6): Paul Vauterin/Bruno Callens (BE), Waltraud Schulze (DE), Annagh Minchin (IE), Donatella Manganelli (IT), Brian Dolan/Lee Kiera/Ann Marie Malon (UK) and Marco Ziegler (CH)
  - Second Excellece Prize Winners: Gianni Insacco (IT),
- 3rd: Zürich, Switzerland 1991
  - First Prize Winners (7): Robert Nitzschmann (DE), Barry O'Doherty/Daniel Dundas (IE), Paul Hoffmann (LU), Angus Filshie (UK), Christian Tost/Sabine Zang (AT), Torkild Jensen (NO) and Hans Jacob Feder (NO)
- 4th: Seville, Spain 1992
  - First Prize Winners (6): Hendrik Küpper/Frithjof Küpper/Martin Spiller (DE), Oliver Trapp (DE), Anders T. Skov (DK), Martin Hesselsoe (DK), Jean Byrne/Elizabeth Dowling (IE) and Dominik Zeiter/Ewald Amherd/Reinhard Fubber (CH)
- 5th: Berlin, Germany 1993
  - First Prize Winners (6): Henrik Mouritsen (DK), Lars Knudsen/Peter Andersen (DK), Albert Barmettler/Guenther Ederer (AT), Jan Kristian Haugland (NO), Rodger Toner/Donal Keane (IE) and Maria Salvany Gonzalez/Antoni Camprubi I Cano/Fidel Costa Rodriguez (ES)
- 6th: Luxembourg, Luxembourg 1994
  - First Prize Winners (6): Oliver Krüger (DE), Eike Lau (DE), Jane Feehan (IE), Christian Krause (DK), Henrik Strøm (NO) and Samuel Schaer (CH)
- 7th: Newcastle upon Tyne, United Kingdom 1995
  - First Prize Winners (3): Sven Siegle (DE), Brian Fitzpatrick/Shane Markey (IE) and Christopher Mead/Matthew Taylor (UK)
- 8th: Helsinki, Finland 1996
  - First Prize Winners (3): Tobias Kippenberg (DE), Yann Ollivier (FR) and Wouter Couzijn (NL)
- 9th: Milan, Italy 1997
  - First Prize Winners (3): Eike Hübner (DE), Fiona Fraser/Ciara McGoldrick/Emma McQuillan (IE) and Christoph Lippuner/Antoine Wüthrich (CH)
- 10th: Porto, Portugal 1998
  - First Prize Winners (3): Gabor Bernath (HU), Paul Pak/Peter Weilenmann (AT) and Robert Carney/Matthew Thomas (UK)
- 11th: Thessaloniki, Greece 1999
  - First Prize Winners (3): Sarah Flannery (IE), Sverrir Gudmumdsson/Pall Melsted/Tryggvi Thorgeirsson (IS) and Michał Książkiewicz (PL)
- 12th: Amsterdam, The Netherlands 2000
  - First Prize Winners (3): Grzegorz Niedźwiedzki (PL), Joanne Daniel/Gemma "Legend" Dawson/Alex Wilkie (UK) and Nickoloz Tchankoshvili (GE)
- 13th: Bergen, Norway 2001
  - First Prize Winners (3): Thomas Aumeyr/Thomas Morocutti (AT), Sebastian Abel (DE) and James Lee Mitchell (UK)
- 14th: Vienna, Austria 2002
  - First Prize Winners (3): Pawel Piotrowski (DE), Martin Etzrodt/Martin von der Helm (DE) and Lauri Kauppila (FI)
- 15th: Budapest, Hungary 2003
  - First Prize Winners (3): Jana Ivanidze (DE), Uwe Treske (DE) and Gábor Németh (HU)
- 16th: Dublin, Ireland 2004
  - First Prize Winners (3): Gerhard Schoeny/Martin Knoebel/Floreian Groessbacher (AT), Charlotte Strandkvist (DK) and Mario Chemnitz (DE)
- 17th: Moscow, Russia 2005
  - First Prize Winners (3): Igor Gotlibovitch/Renate Landig (DE), Javier Lopez Martinez-Fortun/Eliecer Perez Robaina/Carlos Machado Carvajal (ES) and Silvana Konermann (CH)
  - Second Prize Winners: Zdeněk Janovsky (CZ), Stephen Schulz (DE), Patrick Collison (IE)
- 18th: Stockholm, Sweden 2006
  - First Prize Winners (3): Michael Kaiser/Johannes Kienl (AT), Alexander Joos/Johannes Burkart (DE) and Tomasz Wdowik (PL)
  - Second Prize Winners: Thomas Gigl (DE), Michal Marcinkowski (PL), Zoltan Tarjanyi/Csaba Vass (HU)
- 19th: Valencia, Spain, 2007
  - First Prize Winners (3): Florian Ostermaier/Henrike Wilms (DE), Márton Spohn (HU) and Abdusalam Abubakar (IE)
- 20th: Copenhagen, Denmark 2008
  - First Prize Winners (3): Magdalena Bojarska (PL), Martin Tkáč (SK) and Lily Muller (UK)
- 21st: Paris, France 2009
  - First Prize Winners (3): Aleksander Kubica/Wiktor Pilewski (PL), Fabian Gafner (CH), Liam McCarthy/John D. O'Callaghan (IE)
- 22nd: Lisbon, Portugal 2010
  - First Prize Winners (3): Miroslav Rapčák/David Pěgřímek (CZ), Łukasz Sokołowski (PL), Dávid Horváth/Márton Balass (HU)
- 23rd: Helsinki, Finland 2011
  - First Prize Winners (3): Alexander Amini (IE), Pius Markus Theiler (CH), Povilas Kavaliauskas (LT)
- 24th: Bratislava, Slovakia 2012
  - First Prize Winners (3): Mark James Kelly / Eric Doyle (IR), Jakub Nagrodzki (PL), Philip Huprich / Manuel Scheipner / Daniel Zindl (AT)
- 25th: Prague, Czech Republic 2013
  - First Prize Winners (3): Ciara Judge/Emer Hickey/Sophie Healy-Thow (IE), named three of "The 25 Most Influential Teens of 2014" by Time magazine in 2014, Frederick Edward Turner (UK), Perttu Aku Anttoni Pölönen (FIN)
- 26th: Warsaw, Poland 2014
  - 2014 First Prizes Winners (3): João Pedro Estácio Gaspar Gonçalves de Araújo (POR), Mariana De Pinho Garcia / Matilde Gonçalves Moreira da Silva (POR) / Luboš Vozdecký (CZ)
- 27th: Milan, Italy 2015
  - First Prize Winners: Michał Bączyk and Paweł Piotr Czyż, Sanath Kumar Devalapurkar, Lukas Stockner
- 28th: Brussels, Belgium 2016
  - First Prize Winners: Ane Espeseth and Torstein Vik, Valerio Pagliarino, River Grace
  - Second Prize Winners: Tassilo Schwarz, Kayley Ting, Ivo Zell
  - Third Prize Winners: Diana Bura and Mari Louise Fufezan, Tomáš Heger, Yongchan Hong and Yunji Seo
- 29th: Tallinn, Estonia 2017
  - First Prize Winners: Karina Movsesjan (CZ), Adam Jan Alexander Ohnesorge (CH), Danish Mahmood (CA)
  - Second Prize Winners: Colette Benko (CA), Kamil Humański (PL), Yana Zhabura (UA)
  - Third Prize Winners: Arne Jakob Geipel and Matthias Paul Grützner and Julian Egbert (DE), Florian Cäsar and Michael Plainer (AT), Chavdar Tsvetanov Lalov (BG)
- 30th: Dublin, Ireland 2018
  - First Prize Winners: Adrian Fleck and Anna Fleck (DE), Brendon Matusch (CA), Nicolas Fedrigo (CA)
  - Second Prize Winners: Alexandru Liviu Bratosin and Petru Molla and Mihnea Vlad Bojian, Karl Hendrik Tamkivi, Francisco Miguel Araújo
  - Third Prize Winners: Marina Gudzhabidze and Dea Ilarionova and Shorena Gudzhabidze, Kyuhee Jo and Chaeyoung Lee, Sijia Zhang
- 31st: Sofia, Bulgaria 2019
  - First Prize Winners: Leo Li Takemaru, Poojan Pandya, Adam Kelly, Alex Korocencev, Felix Sewing, Magnus Quaade Oddershede
  - Second Prize Winners: Saba Gogichaishvili, Nia Gogokhia, Olli Järviniemi, Jaehyun Lee, Claudia Lídia Pubill Quintillà
  - Third Prize Winners: Antoni Ignacy Lis, Noah Scheiring, Andreas Ladner, Tobias Schauer, Océane Zofia Adrienne Patiny, Aliaksandr Piachonkin
- 32nd: Salamanca, Spain 2021
  - First Prize Winners for 2020: Feridun Balaban, Cormac Thomas Harris, Alan Thomas O'Sullivan
  - Second Prize Winners for 2020: Ophélie Léna Rivière, Yordan Tsvetkov Tsvetkov
  - Third Prize Winners for 2020: Dmitriy Gorovoy, Jarosław Jakub Brodecki
  - First Prize Winners for 2021: Marik Müller, Viktor Stilianov Kolev, Carla Caro Villanova, Illia Nalyvaiko
  - Second Prize Winners for 2021:Mehmet Sertaç Çeküç, Hardit Singh (CA), Sophie Lynn Wiesmann, Giovanni Benetti
  - Third Prize Winners for 2021:Gregory Guy Tarr, Matus Mlynar, Michal Bravanský
- 36th: Riga, Latvia 2025
  - First Prize Winners: Anna Černá, Evan Budz, Dani Zuhair and Antoni Łuczak
  - Second Prize Winners: Ermis Tatsis, Sara Waqas, Carolina Coelho and Ceren Sel
  - Third Prize Winners: Ethan Shuai Yan, Sille Porsborg Christensen, Lili Szokolai and Mia Maurer & Misha Hegde
