= Synge Street CBS =

Christian Brothers-founded school in Dublin, Ireland

Synge Street CBS Secondary School Sancta Maria CBS Primary School
- (Bunscoil na mBráithre Críostaí, Sráid Synge)

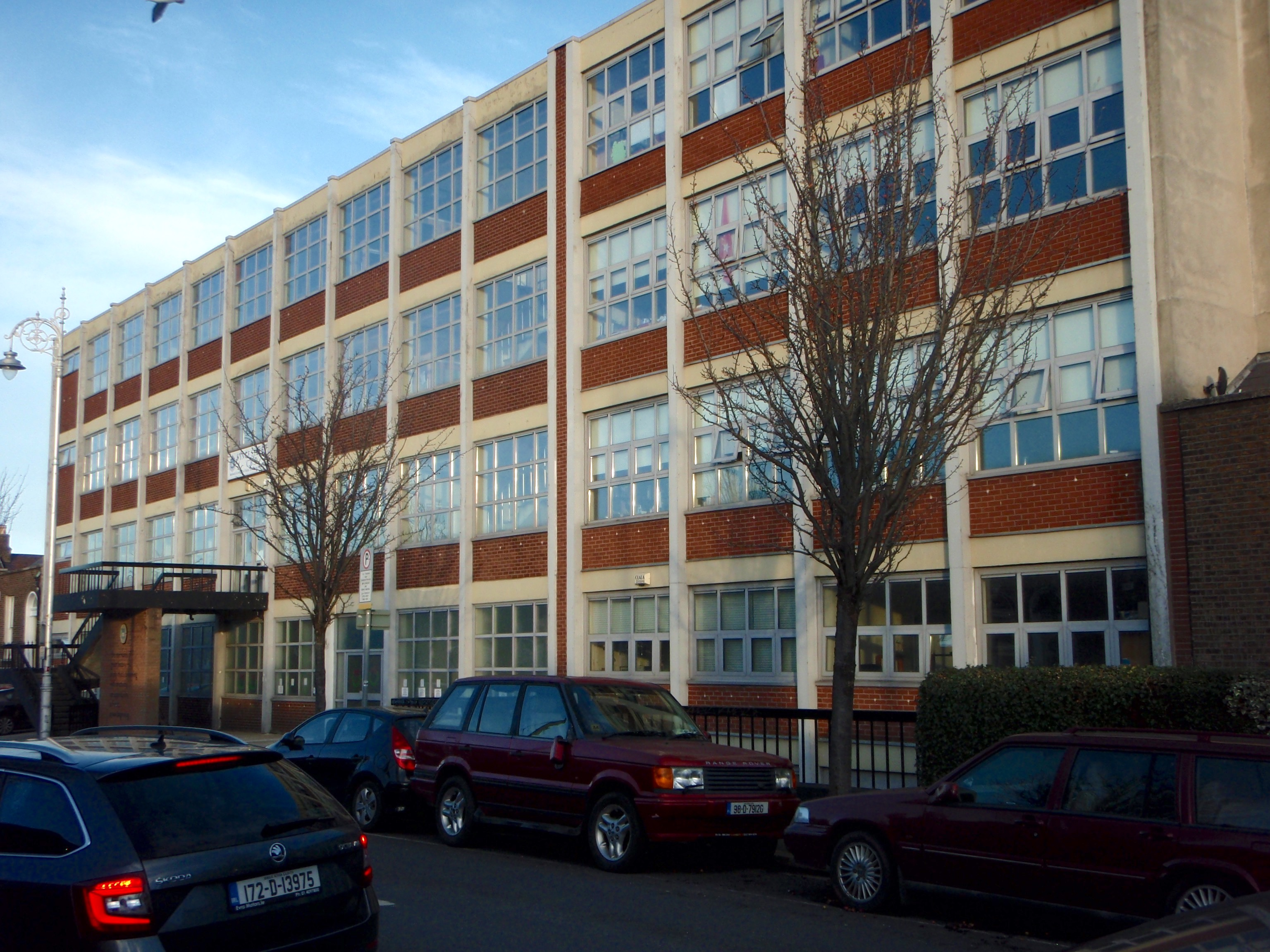
- The St Pauls building on Heytesbury Street in Dublin, part of the school

Location
- Synge Street, Dublin; D08 R283; 53.3333°N 6.26833°W

Information
- Type: Voluntary secondary school (Edmund Rice Schools Trust (formerly Christian Brothers))
- Motto: "Viriliter Age" ("Act Manfully")
- Religious affiliation: Roman Catholic
- Founded: 1864; 162 years ago
- Founder: Canon Edward McCabe; Brother Edward O'Flaherty
- Principal: (Secondary) Clare Catterson
- Gender: (Secondary) Boys, (Primary) Mixed
- Age range: (Secondary) 12–19, (Primary) 4–12
- Enrollment: 363
- Colours: Blue and White
- Website: syngestreet.com

Synge Street CBS (colloquially Synger) is a boys' non-fee-paying state school, under the auspices of the Edmund Rice Schools Trust, located in the Dublin 8 area of Dublin, Ireland. The school was founded in 1864 by Canon Edward McCabe and Brother Edward O'Flaherty, as part of a mid-nineteenth century programme to expand the provision of Catholic schooling across the city, particularly for poorer boys. It was important in developing multiple new Christian Brothers schools in the local area and beyond.

Originally the school was part of the Christian Brothers monastery, but in 1954 new buildings were erected for primary pupils, and in 1964 for secondary pupils on Heytesbury Street. Although founded and largely known as an all-boys school, since 2016 it has offered co-educational Gaelscoil classes at primary level. Having been the second-largest school in the country in the 1950s, the school roll declined significantly from the turn of the millennium, and by 2021 there were only around 260 pupils at second level, and just 100 at primary. In September 2024, it was announced that the secondary school would be moving to a co-educational basis, and all-Irish education. The moves were controversial as they had not been discussed with parents or staff in advance, even the principal, and many staff were said to lack the training to teach other subjects through Irish. Further, with much of the student body having a diverse background, some sources suggested that many would have to move school as a result, though it was later clarified that pupils already in the school would complete their education in English, with a new set of classes commencing from September 2026 with all-Irish tuition. As of June 2026, just two pupils had enrolled for the new all-Irish operation.

The school has a long list of notable alumni in Irish political, business, academic, media and sporting life, including both the President and Taoiseach of Ireland for a period of nearly two years in the mid-1970s, and is a status that has led to the school being described as the Eton of Ireland. It also has a strong record in the Young Scientist and Technology Exhibition becoming, in 2022, the first school to win the overall prize four times.

== History ==
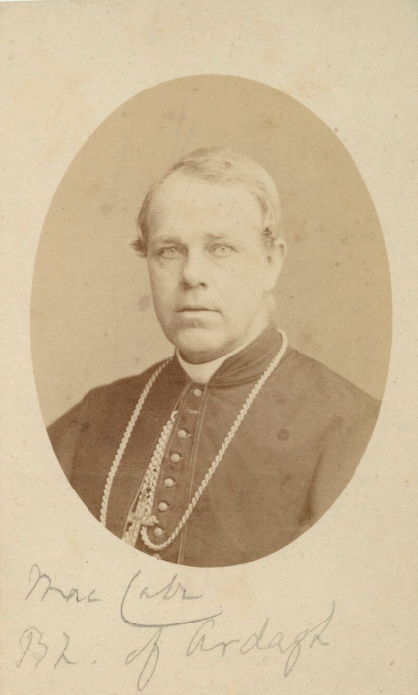
Edward McCabe, one of the founders of the school, as Archbishop of Dublin

Mid-nineteenth century Ireland, and Dublin in particular, saw a major push for expansion of Catholic education. Church officials were particularly keen to ensure there was provision for the poor and given societal perspectives of the time, this led to a focus on provision for poor boys. When Canon Edward McCabe was appointed as parish priest at St Nicholas parish in Francis Street, in the Liberties, it was probably inevitable that church institutions would expand in the area, after the successful struggle for Catholic emancipation in the 1820s and 1830s.

In 1861, he secured a parcel of land between Synge Street and Heytesbury Street and built a temporary wooden church as the basis for a new neighbouring parish of Saint Kevin's. Between 1862 and 1864, he raised funding for and commissioned the building of the original monastery and school on the Synge Street side of the plot.

McCabe's partner in these endeavours was Brother Edward O'Flaherty, a teacher at the Christian Brothers' Mill Street school. O'Flaherty had taught James Aloysius Hoare at Mill Street in the 1820s, and it was more than fortuitous that Hoare was appointed as the third Superior General of the order in 1862.

The first school opened on 12 April 1864, with O'Flaherty as the first Superior, and the first pupil enrolled was Paul McSwiney, son of the Lord Mayor of Dublin, Peter Paul McSwiney. Very quickly the number on roll reached its limit at 600 pupils with 10 Christian Brothers employed teaching them.

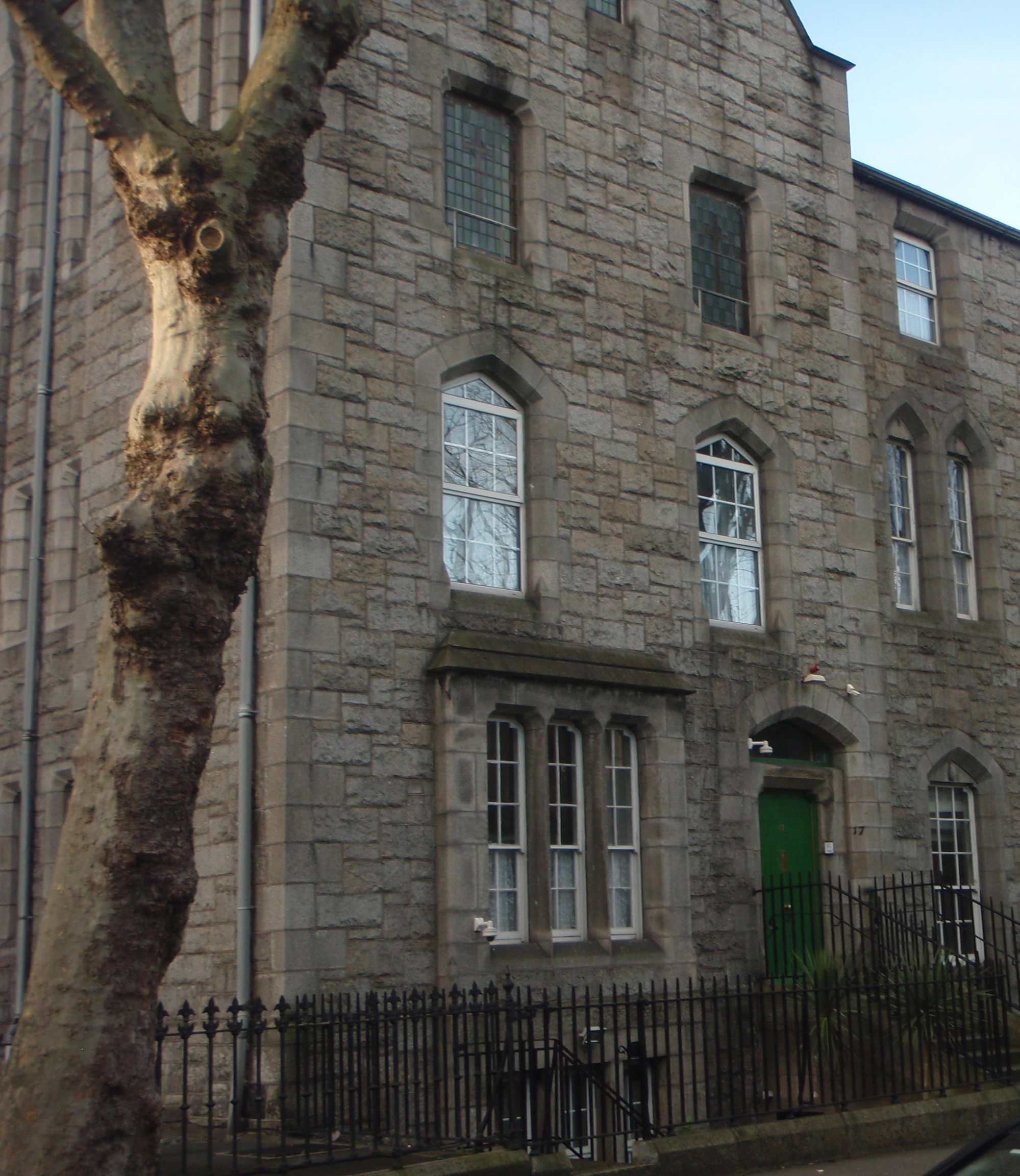
The Christian Brothers monastery on Synge Street

The school building was extended four times over the next half century culminating with the purchase and demolition of three cottages at Nos. 13–15 Synge Street and extending the school building into the space. In 1931, a gaelscoil was opened in premises at Harcourt Street by brothers from the school community. Called Coláiste Mhuire, the school in 1933 moved to the Gaelic League headquarters on Parnell Square and ceased to be managed from Synge Street.

In 1925 the school affiliated to the newly created Irish Free State's Programme for National Schools, and has continued to provide education free of charge since then.

The school is known as "Synger" colloquially.

The new secondary school has been officially known as St Paul's Secondary School, Heytesbury Street. The present building replaced a row of houses, used for class-rooms, and was opened by the Minister of Education Donogh O'Malley in January 1967, and blessed by John Charles McQuaid. It was extended in the 1980s.

In September 2024, it was announced that the school would be moving to a co-educational basis, and an all-Irish educational approach. It later became known that this decision was only notified to the principal, and then staff, the day before public announcement, and without involvement of parents, the actual decision having been made by the Edmund Rice Schools Trust and approved by the Minister for Education. It was stated that many staff were not trained to teach other subjects through Irish, and much of the student body has a diverse national or ethnical background, with some sources suggest that many will have to move school as a result. It was later clarified that existing pupils would continue their education through Irish, under the existing principal, while new pupils would work solely through Irish, under a deputy principal. As of June 2026, only two pupils had enrolled for the 2026-2027 school year.

=== School roll ===
Having started with 600 on the roll in 1864, by 1963 the roll had expanded to 1500. A profile in the Irish Times in 1953 described the school as the second largest in the country.

The roll size has collapsed in recent years, due to changes in local demographics; in 2010 the school saw its roll fall by 11% over 2004 figures. But it is still seen to be a very viable school, and in 2015 had been part of the Delivering Equality in Schools (DEIS) programme for the past 20 years.

=== Primary schools ===
In 1930 a new primary school was opened at Donore Avenue to the west, under the patronage of the Brothers at Synge Street. This was followed in 1947 by the building of Scoil Iosagáin Primary School, again under Synge Street's patronage, to the south at Aughavanna Road in Dolphin's Barn, and by the opening, in 1954, of the new Sancta Maria CBS primary to the north of the current school on Synge Street. In 1961, a new primary was opened at Francis Street, replacing an earlier 1846 building, under the patronage of the school's Christian Brothers community.

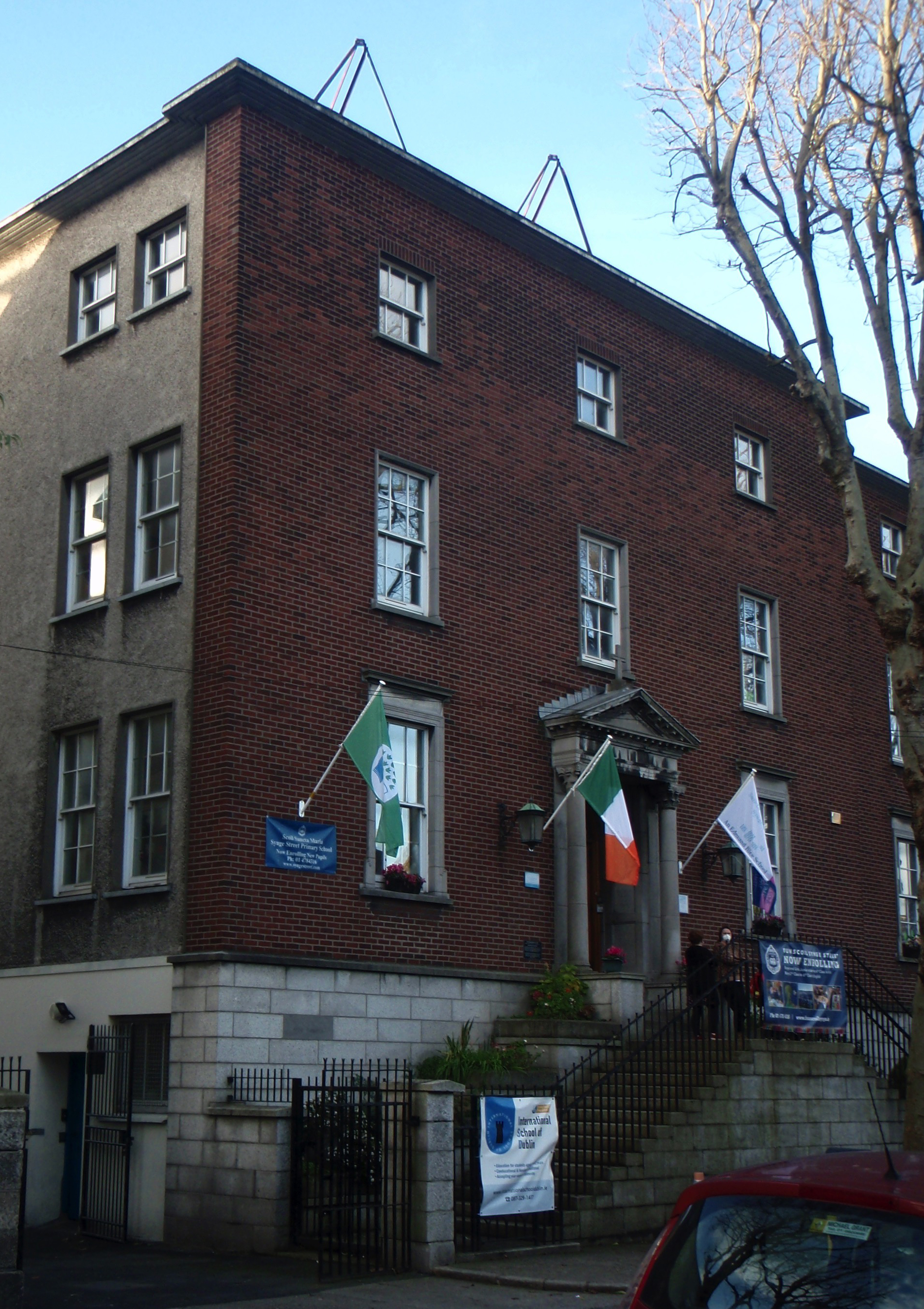
The main entrance to the Sancta Maria Primary School building on Synge Street

In 2017 Bunscoil Sancta Maria changed its enrolment policy to accept boys and girls at Junior Infant level to be educated via the medium of Irish. The existing enrolment of boys at 2nd class remains. This Irish stream was the first-ever 'sruth' established at primary level in Ireland.

== School site and buildings ==
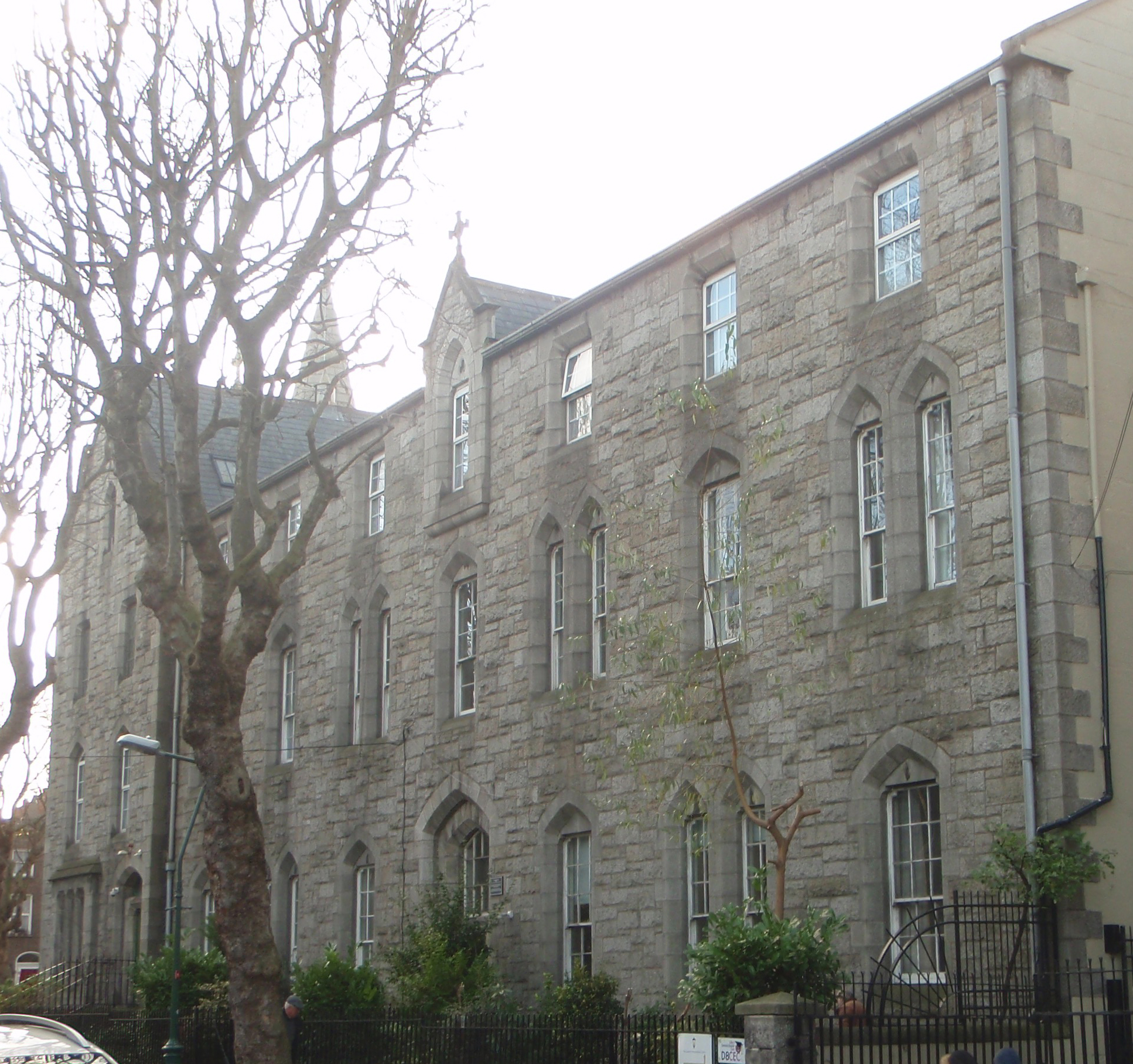
The original school building on Synge Street in Dublin, now The Lantern Centre

The school, at its greatest extent, covered most of the area delimited by Heytesbury Street, Grantham Street, Synge Street and Harrington Street in Dublin 8. The other major building on this block is St Kevin's Church, which had very strong links with the school, providing a venue for most school-related religious celebrations.

There are two main school buildings, St Pauls Secondary School facing onto Heytesbury Street, and Sancta Maria Primary School on Synge Street. The third large building on the site now hosts the Lantern Centre, a community intercultural venue, although it was the original school building and Christian Brothers monastery. St Pauls was built in the 1960s and extended in the 1980s. It contains three science labs, an art room, and a library, as well as the classrooms. It hosts the school PE hall which is also used for drama productions and featured in the film Sing Street.

== Curriculum ==
The school educates to Leaving Certificate and runs a transition year. It has been perceived to be a traditionally academic school. Gay Byrne has indicated in his era that the prime driver of the school was for the boys to pass their exams.

In September 2024, it was announced that the school would be moving to a co-educational basis, and all-Irish education. It later became known that this was only notified to the principal, and then staff, the day before public announcement, the actual decision having been made by the Edmund Rice Schools Trust with the approval of the Minister for Education. Many staff are not trained to teach other subjects through Irish, and much of the student body has a diverse national or ethnical background, and some sources suggest that many pupils will have to move school as a result.

=== Drama and the arts ===
The school has a long history of drama productions including The Plough and the Stars and The Risen People. Records for an "Annual Concert" go back to 1893. When St Pauls was built in the 1960s it included a large fully equipped theatre which was used to produce drama productions right from the beginning.

== Sports ==
As with most non-fee-paying Christian Brothers schools, the sporting focus of the school was in gaelic games, to the point that other sports, especially soccer, were actively discouraged. But activities such as athletics, water polo, golf swimming and chess were tolerated and even encouraged.

=== Gaelic football ===
Football and hurling were the school's two traditional sports throughout the 20th century. The school produced numerous successful teams, including Dublin and Leinster Colleges Champions in 1964 at Under 15, a team that included Don Givens, while the school contested three out of six Leinster Colleges hurling and football finals in 1956. The Leinster Junior Cup winning team of 1965 comprised the core of the 1967 Leinster Senior Cup finalists, including one Anton O'Toole in both teams.

==== Synge Street Past Pupils Gaelic Football Club ====
Until 1999, past pupils of the school played together in a unique club – Synge Street Past Pupils GFC. The club would only register players who had formerly been pupils at the school. In 1999 the club merged with Templeogue GFC to form Templeogue Synge Street GFC.

The club own their own grounds at Dolphin Park, in Dolphins Barn. This ground was originally the Dolphin Racing Track and was purchased by the Christian Brothers in 1943, as playing fields for the school, with a total area of 15 acres, but were subsequently sold to the club in the 1990s.

=== Soccer ===
The school has a very strong soccer tradition producing many great players including Ireland internationals Billy Whelan (one of the Busby Babes who died in the Munich air disaster), Tommy Hamilton (the Shamrock Rovers stalwart) and Andy Reid.

The school fielded its first competitive soccer team in 1975, and won the Leinster Junior School's Cup in 1977. Until recently had a very strong under 18s soccer team winning Leinster Trophies and representing the school in many tournaments including the Schools World Cup in Israel, where Synge Street represented Ireland in 1993. They finished the competition in sixth place and took the fair play award.

=== Hurling ===
The school also has a strong hurling tradition with teams reaching many Dublin and Leinster finals at all levels.

Kevin's Hurling club, also based in Dolphin's Barn, is independent of the school, being originally set up for Saint Kevin's Parish. But its association with the school goes back to the turn of the 20th century. In 1934 Sylvestor Muldowney, a past pupil of the school, became one of the few Dublin natives to represent his county in an All-Ireland hurling final.

== Young Scientist Exhibition ==
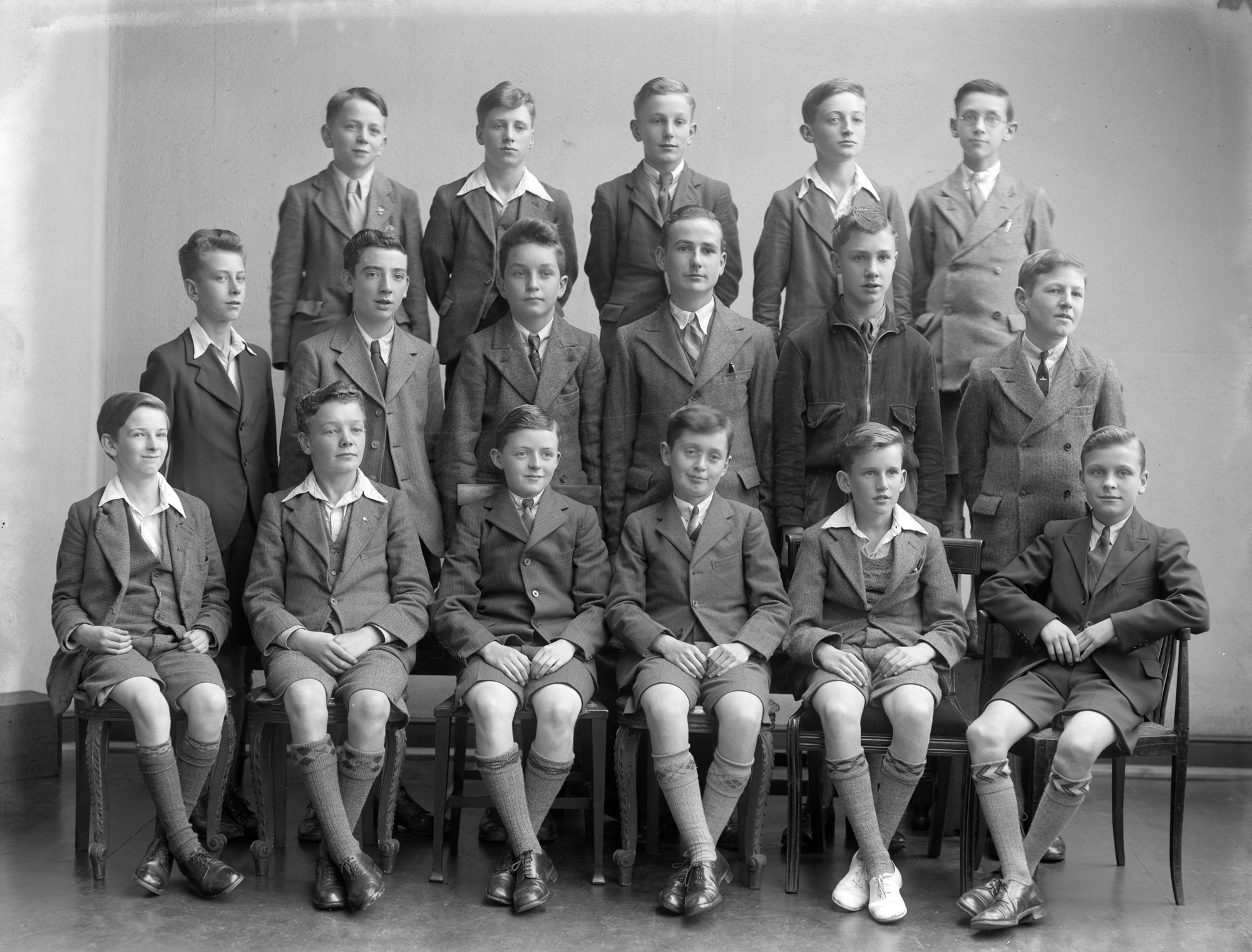
Synge Street pupils, c.1941. Tom Burke, co-founder of the Young Scientist Exhibition is pictured

The school has one of the best success rates in the Young Scientist competition and one of their science teachers, Jim Cooke, was considered one of the best science teachers in Ireland, receiving many awards in his field. The school has won the overall contest of the BT Young Scientist competition on four occasions, the only school to ever do so.

The first outright winner from the school was 5th-year student Ronan Larkin in 2004, having won a category prize the previous year, which then paved the way into a remarkable decade of success. His winning project was entitled 'Generalised Continued Fractions'. The winner in 2007 was Somalia-born Abdusalam Abubakar, a 3rd year student, who became one of the youngest winners of the BT Young Scientist of the Year Award and later went on to win the EU Contest for Young Scientists for his project, which was entitled An Extension of Wiener's Attack on RSA.

In 2009, Andrei Triffo won the Intel Travel Award, the fourth individual honour award for Synge Street in a five year period. As well as Triffo, a group consisting of Gary Carr, Graham McGrath and Darragh Moriarty also claimed a prize in the Chemical, Physical and Mathematical Intermediate category. This was followed in 2012, when Leaving Cert students Eric Doyle and Mark Kelly won the overall prize and represented Ireland in the European Union Contest for Young Scientists competition in September 2012 in Bratislava, where they were awarded 1st place in Physics, and joint overall first place.

In 2017, the school won 3 awards, including both 1st and 2nd Place in the Junior Group category, where Carl Jones and Keiron O'Neill won with a project on Generalisations of Feynman's Triangle Theorem. In 2022, Junior Cert students Aditya Joshi, aged 15, and Aditya Kumar, aged 16, took home the top prize for their project entitled "A New Method of Solving the Bernoulli Quadrisection Problem".

The first ever Young Scientist Exhibition was held in the Mansion House, Dublin in 1965: 230 students participated and 5,000 people attended. One of the co-founders was Fr. Tom Burke who was himself a past pupil, from the class of 1941.

=== Honours list ===
- 2022 – Aditya Joshi and Aditya Kumar took home the top prize for their project entitled "A New Method of Solving the Bernoulli Quadrisection Problem"
- 2021 – Yaduvir Harhangi and Marton Goz – Senior Group Winners and Trinity College Global Challenges Award
- 2020 – Yaduvir Harhangi – Intermediate Individual Winner
- 2018 – Yaduvir Harhangi – Junior Individual Winner
- 2017 – Carl Jones and Keiron O'Neill – Junior Group Winners
- 2016 – Gabriel Barat and Adrian Wolniak – Group Runners-up and Intel Travel Award Winners
- 2014 – Sufyan Huma and Haider Hussain – Intel Travel Award
- 2012 – Mark Kelly and Eric Doyle – Overall Winner.
- 2009 – Andrei Triffo – Best Individual Award and Intel Travel Award
- 2007 – Abdusalam Abubakar – Overall Winner.
- 2006 – Keith Florea, Adrian Chisa and Sandeep Sihag – Group Winners
- 2006 – Gohar Abbasi – Overall Runner Up
- 2005 – Michael Mulhall and Francis Wasser – Group Winners.
- 2005 – Louie Placides, Haniel Tsegburhan, Stefan Triffo – Junior group Category winners – Chemical, Physical and Mathematical Sciences
- 2005 – Gohar Abbasi – Senior individual Category winner – Chemical, Physical and Mathematical Sciences
- 2004 – Ronan Larkin – Overall Winner
- 2003 – Ronan Larkin – Category Prize

== Notable teaching staff ==
As well as Jim Cooke, other notable past teachers of the school include Francis MacManus, three of whose pupils James Plunkett, Pearse Hutchinson and John Jordan, went on to be famous writers. Former TD Tony Gregory taught at the school in the 1960s and 70s.

=== List of Superiors ===
Traditionally, the Christian Brothers appointed a Brother Superior to head each monastery and manage any attached schools. This is a list of those known to have held the post at Synge Street:

- 1864–1867 Bro E P O'Flaherty
- 1867–1873 Bro H A Joy
- 1873–1876 Bro T R Ring
- 1876–1889 Bro P B O'Brien
- 1889–1894 Bro B L O'Neill
- 1894–1901 Bro W M O'Callaghan
- 1901–1903 Bro R B Fleming
- 1903–1905 Bro D D Madigan
- 1905–1913 Bro J T Hayes
- 1913–1919 Bro J A Burgess
- 1919–1923 Bro T J Stapleton
- 1923–1928 Bro J A Burgess
- 1928–1930 Bro T M Lennane
- 1930–1936 Bro J L Burke
- 1936–1942 Bro E F Lonergan
- 1942–1948 Bro P S Walsh
- 1948–1954 Bro J K Mulhall
- 1954–1956 Bro J F Dowling
- 1956–1962 Bro M F O'Mahoney
- 1962–1968 Bro J D Fegan
- 1968–1972 Bro F B Donovan
- 1973–1976 Bro P Tynan
- 1977–1982 Bro P B Cripps

== Notable past pupils ==
=== Media and the arts ===
- Eamonn Andrews, television presenter
- Noel Andrews, RTÉ boxing commentator
- Deaglán de Bréadún, Irish Times journalist
- Gay Byrne, television and radio presenter
- John Carney, film director
- Don Cockburn, newsreader
- John Connolly, author
- Donal Donnelly, actor
- John Earle, musician
- Louis Elliman, past owner of the Gaiety Theatre and Theatre Royal
- Charles B. Fitzsimons, actor, and brother of Maureen O'Hara
- Jarlath Hayes, graphic designer and typographer
- Kieran Hickey, film director
- Pearse Hutchinson, poet
- John Jordan, poet
- Charles E. Kelly, cartoonist
- David Kelly, actor
- Peter Lennon, director of the film Rocky Road to Dublin
- Patrick Joseph McCall, poet and songwriter
- Hugh McFadden, poet
- Jack MacGowran, actor
- Eamon Morrissey, actor
- Mike Murphy, broadcaster
- Jim Norton, actor
- Dennis O'Dea, actor
- Brian O'Nolan, who wrote under the pseudonym Flann O'Brien
- Kieran O'Reilly, actor and musician
- Cathal Ó Sándair, Irish language author
- Milo O'Shea, actor
- Seán O'Sullivan RHA, painter and designer of Irish Stamps
- Basil Payne, poet
- James Plunkett, writer
- Cornelius Ryan, writer
- Pete St. John, Irish folk singer-songwriter
- Cecil Sheridan, comedian
- Niall Stokes, publisher of Hot Press magazine
- Patrick Swift, painter
- Derek Warfield, founder of the Wolfe Tones
- Richard Weber, poet and artist

=== Politics and public service ===
- David Andrews, Fianna Fail TD
- Niall Andrews, Fianna Fail TD
- Todd Andrews, republican activist, public servant, and father to 2 TDs
- Joseph Barnes, doctor
- Harry Boland, Irish Volunteer, his brother Gerald also hurled for the first Kevin's Hurling club team
- John Boland, Fine Gael politician and government minister
- Rory Brady, former Attorney General of Ireland
- Tom Burke, priest, educator and founder of the Young Scientists
- Eric Byrne, Irish Labour Party TD
- Seán Campbell, senator and trade union leader
- Desmond Clarke, academic
- Jim Cooke, teacher and mentor to Young Scientists
- Liam Cosgrave, politician
- John Crown, Senator and consultant oncologist.
- Robert Dudley Edwards, historian
- Joseph Finnegan, judge
- Paddy Finucane, Second World War fighter pilot
- Thomas Gay, republican and librarian
- Michael Hayes, first Ceann Comhairle of Dáil Éireann
- William Hayes, President of St John's College, Oxford, 1987–2001
- Daire Keogh, Irish historian, President of St Patrick's College, Drumcondra, later President of Dublin City University
- Liam Lawlor, politician
- Con Lehane, republican activist
- Liam Lysaght, chief state solicitor and President of the Leinster Branch of IRFU
- Dermot McCarthy, senior civil servant
- Thomas McLaughlin, designer of the Shannon hydroelectric scheme
- John Moore SMA, Bishop of Bauchi
- Kevin Murphy, career civil servant, Ombudsman and Information Commissioner
- Aindrias Ó Caoimh, Judge of the High Court
- Charlie O'Connor, Fianna Fáil TD
- Cearbhall Ó Dálaigh, former President of Ireland
- Cillian Ryan, professor and economist
- Richie Ryan, politician
- James Sanfey, Fine Gael General Secretary
- Michael Woods, politician

=== Sport ===
- Paddy Andrews, footballer
- John Coady, footballer
- Joe Doyle, cyclist and national official
- Don Givens, footballer
- Tommy Hamilton, footballer
- Eddie Jordan, motor racing boss
- Paddy Lowry, Olympic sprinter
- David McGill, former professional footballer
- Donnacha O'Dea, professional poker player & Olympic swimmer
- Kevin O'Flanagan, rugby and soccer international, Olympics administrator and doctor
- Anton O'Toole, footballer
- Andy Reid, footballer
- Col Billy Ringrose, army officer and equestrian
- Liam Whelan, footballer and Busby babe
- Thomas Williams, cricketer
Past pupils of Synge Street CBS
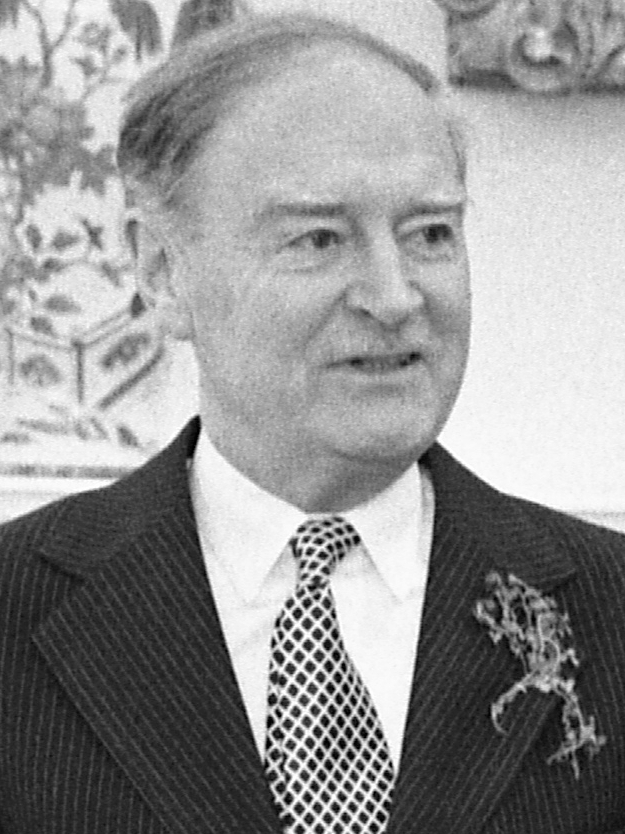
Liam Cosgrave

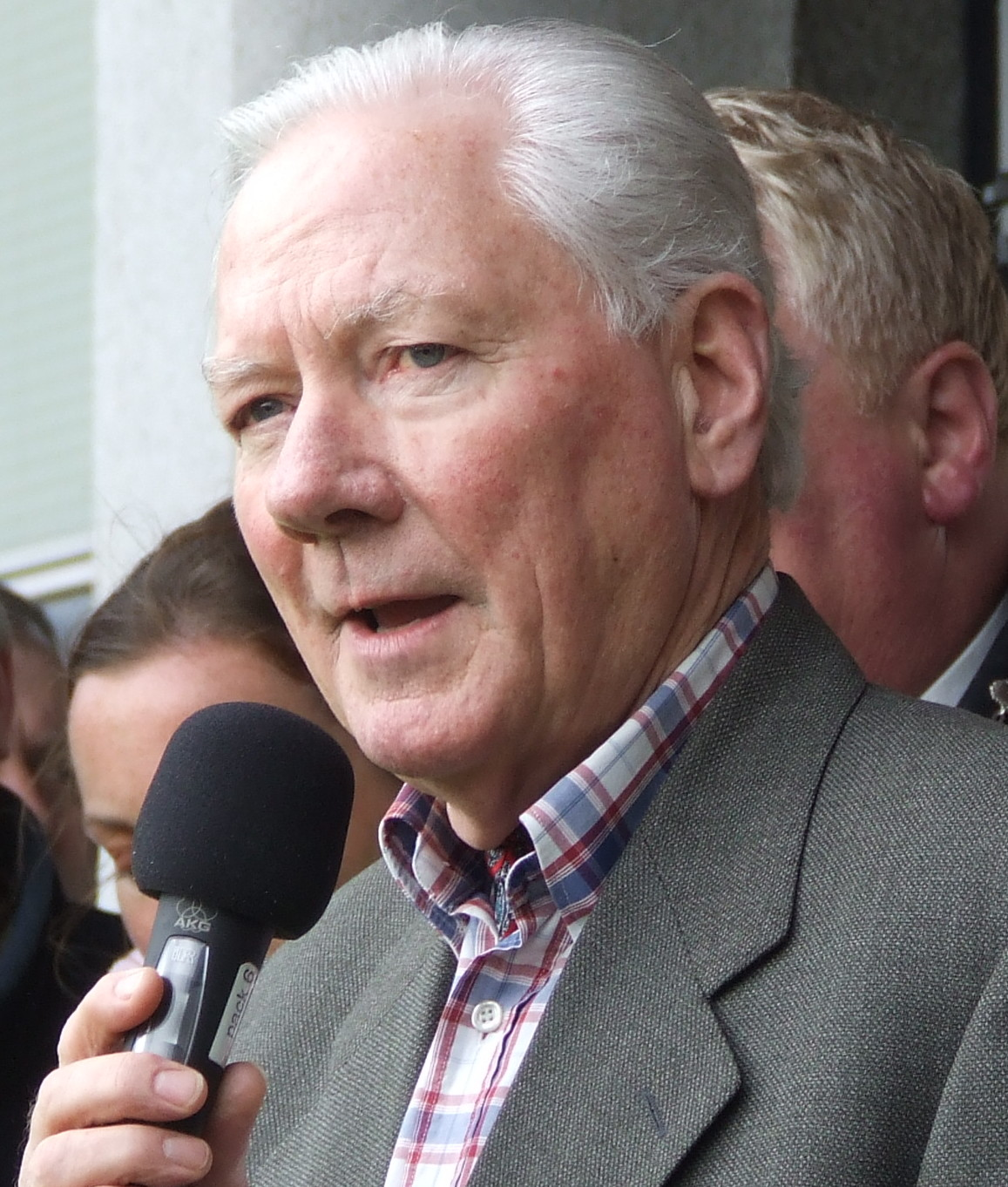
Gay Byrne

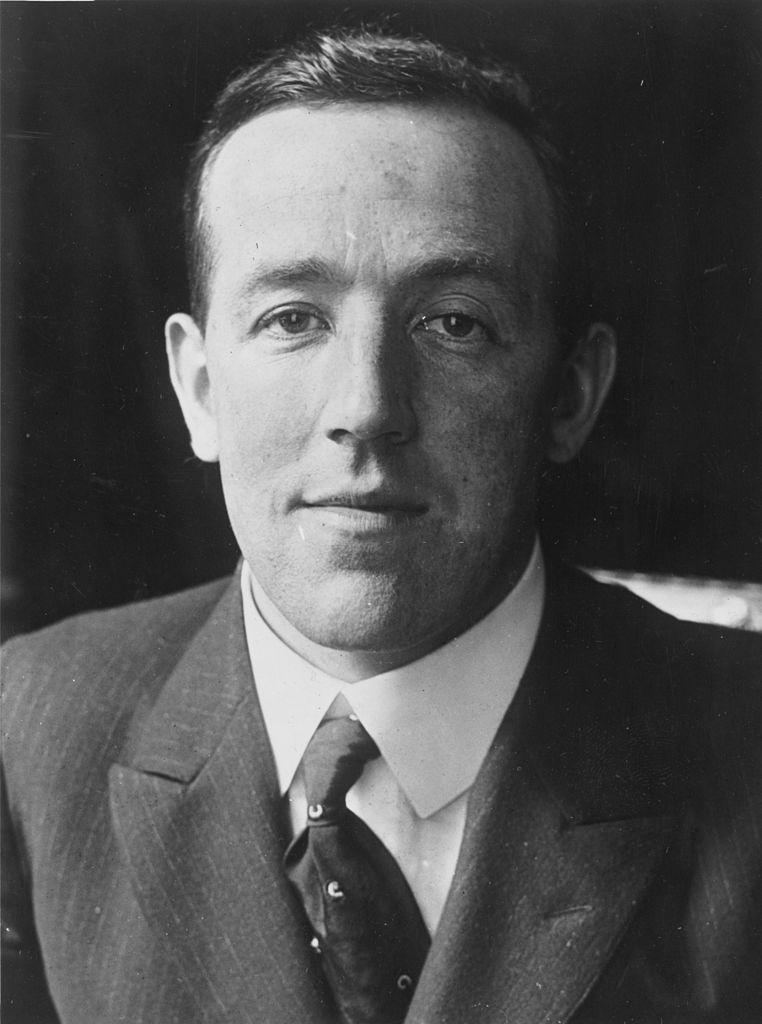
Harry Boland

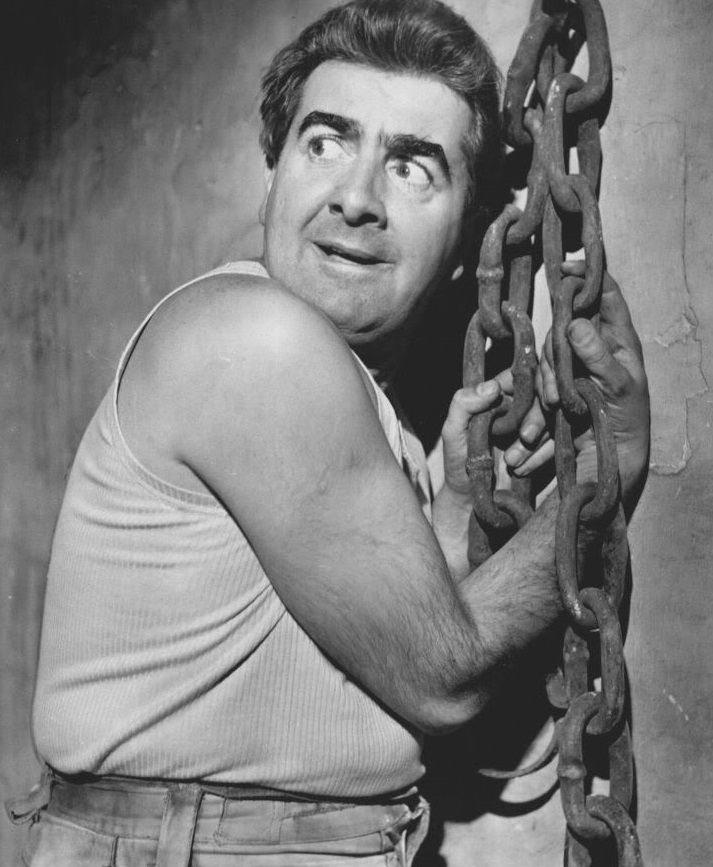
Milo O'Shea

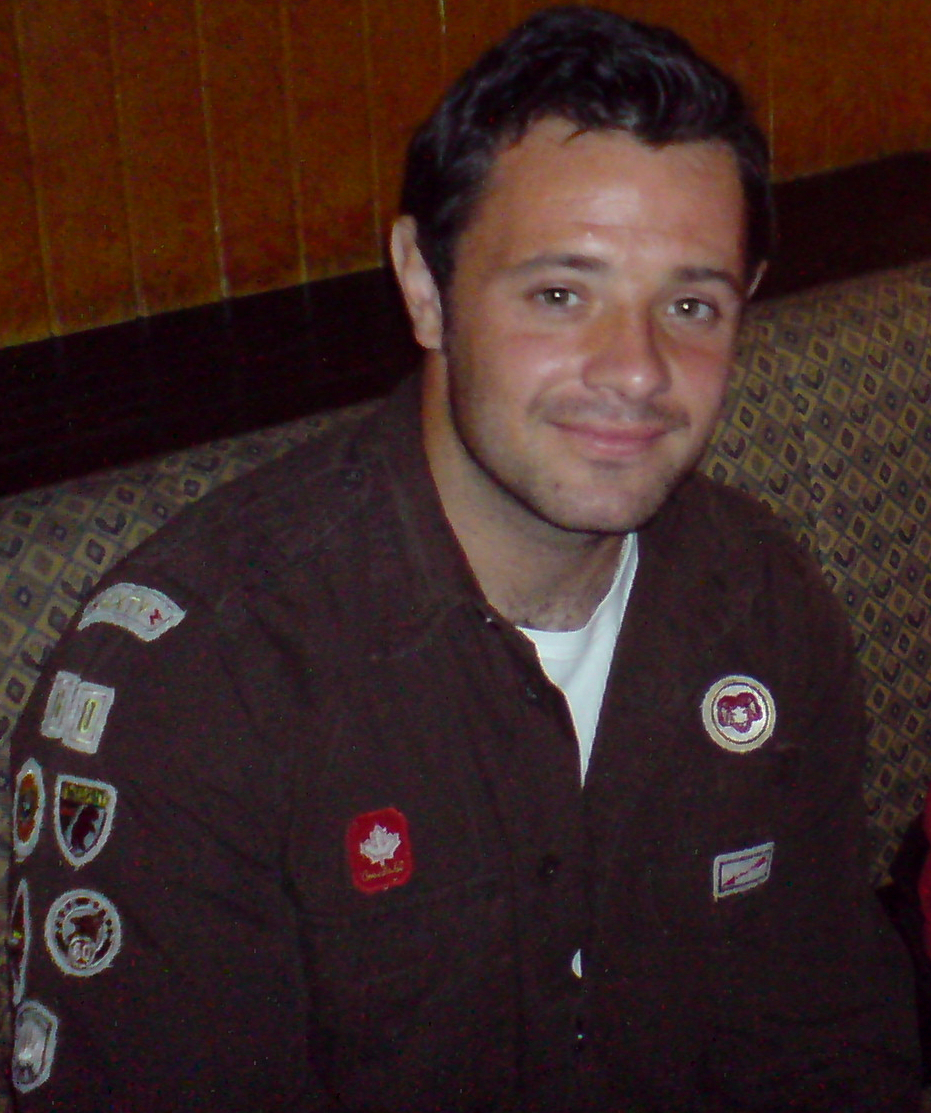
Andy Reid

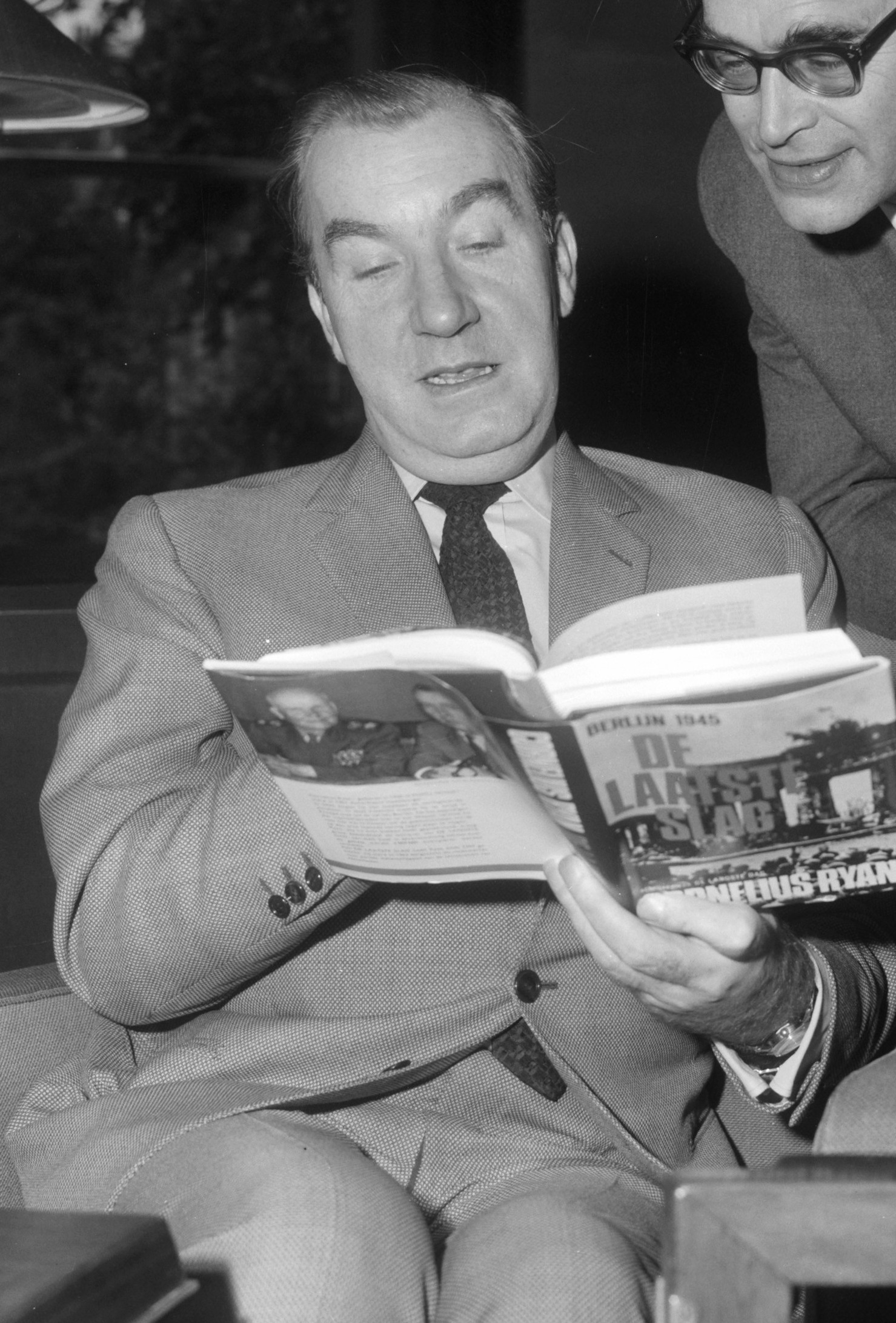
Cornelius Ryan

== Motto ==
The school motto is "Viriliter Age" (translated "Act Manfully") and is a standard used by many Christian Brothers' schools throughout the world.

== Religion ==
As a Christian Brothers school, the school has always had a strong Roman Catholic ethos. This includes a long history of having its own fraternity of the Society of Saint Vincent de Paul, as well as prayers before each class. The teaching of religion was considered to be important not only to the school and pupils, but also to the state.

== Reputation ==
The school has garnered an enviable reputation, particularly in relation to its notable alumni, even being compared to Eton College in relation to Irish public service. At one point both the President of Ireland and the Taoiseach who served him, Cearbhall Ó Dálaigh and Liam Cosgrave respectively, were both past pupils, as well as the Minister for Finance and Garda Commissioner. The Taoiseach, Seán Lemass praised the school as "... a Dublin institution of which all Dublin men were aware and proud..." at the school's centenary dinner in 1967. Lemass's Dail colleague, Cosgrave opined, at a Synge Street Past Pupils Union dinner, that "No Christian Brothers' school had a better record than Synge Street, and the numerous past pupils ... who had achieved eminence in different walks of life, was an indication of the high standard of education provided".

Its illustrious alumni list is no accident. The school always had a reputation for high educational standards and exam results. Students have achieved first place in the Leaving Certificate in subjects such as physics, chemistry and Irish, amongst others.

Synge Street students regularly excelled in events such as the Father Mathew Feis, winning and placing in multiple awards year after year. As early as 1907, three of the scholarships offered by the diocese of Dublin were awarded to Synge Street students. Senior boys have been invited to contribute to current affairs programmes on RTÉ Television, and complimented on the lucidity of their contributions. Students also excelled at chess, with the school regularly placing in the upper parts of the Leinster Schools Chess competitions.

Students are encouraged to move on to third-level education by the school, and financial assistance is available from a charitable bequest by a now-deceased former pupil. In 2012, 83% of Leaving Certificate students at the school progressed to further or higher education courses.

The school also had a reputation for the overuse of corporal punishment, with one pupil receiving 75 slaps of the leather for one offence.

=== Past Pupils Union ===
The school has a very active alumni organisation, Synge Street Past Pupils Union, which was formed in 1933. The PPU hosts an annual alumni dinner and raises money to provides grants to the school.

Additionally, it helps administer a trust setup by a former past-pupil – Con Creedon – which provides grants to past pupils entering third-level education. When the programme began in 2006, it distributed grants to just 3 students, while by 2014 the number had grown to 82. This has helped raise the proportion of leaving cert students transitioning to third-level to 78% in 2014.

=== Abuse allegations ===
In 2005, a Brother at the school, Dan Doheny, was tried on charges of abuse which was alleged to have occurred when he was teaching at St Joseph's Industrial School, Tralee 30 years previously. In 2020, a former teacher at the primary school, Patrick Harte, was convicted of multiple indecent assault charges relating back to the 1960s and 1970s at the school. His appeal was subsequently dismissed by the Court of Criminal Appeal. Father Dominic Boland, a Capuchin priest who was a chaplain to the primary school was also convicted of similar offences and was named in chapter 32 of the Dublin diocesan Murphy report.

== In popular culture ==
The 1990s teen musical series Finbar's Class was filmed in the school.

John Carney, a past pupil of the school, set his 2016 feature film Sing Street in and around the school. The film's protagonist, Conor/Cosmo, attends the school, forming a band with schoolmates and coming into conflict with the fictional Christian Brother school principal. The film's production notes make clear that the school and persons portrayed in the film are very different from the school as it is today.
