= 1968 Cannes Film Festival =

- Official poster of the 21st Cannes Film Festival, an original illustration by Beaugendre.
- Opening film: Gone with the Wind
- Closing film: Rocky Road to Dublin (Final film screened)
- Location: Cannes, France
- Founded: 1946
- Awards: No awards given
- Hosted by: Grace Kelly
- No. of films: 28 (In Competition)
- Festival date: 10 May 1968 – 24 May 1968
- Website: festival-cannes.com/en

Cannes Film Festival
- 1969 1967

The 21st Cannes Film Festival took place from 10 to 19 May 1968, when it was officially cancelled due to the ongoing turmoil of May 1968 in France. French writer André Chamson served as jury president for the main competition.

The festival opened with Gone with the Wind (1939) by Victor Fleming.

== Background ==
This edition was marked by the previous controversy around the Langlois affair. On February 9, 1968 a meeting of the board of directors of the Cinémathèque Française (a non-profit organization), in which the representatives of the Ministry of Culture and of the Centre national du cinéma et de l'image animée (which depended on the latter) decided to remove Henri Langlois, director and co-founder of the Cinémathèque, from his position. Even though they were not a majority, Langlois supporters such as François Truffaut refused to cast their vote. André Malraux, the French Minister of Culture, had prompted this decision because he wanted to implement managerial changes to gain more influence in the institution. After another vote Pierre Barbin, director of the Tours and Annecy film festivals, became the new director.

Langlois was a very popular and beloved figure and this decision sparked a number of protests and demonstrations by filmmakers of the French New Wave, as well as actors, critics and fans who demonstrated in front of the Cinémathèque at the Palais de Chaillot on February 12. Many internationally acclaimed film directors like Charles Chaplin, Stanley Kubrick, Roberto Rossellini, Orson Welles and Luis Buñuel also sent letters in support of Langlois and even threatened to retrieve the copies of their films previously given to the Cinemathéque. On February 14, another demonstration took place but this time artists were joined by Sorbonne University students in what was a prelude of what was going to happen in the following months. French filmmakers decided to form the Committee for the Defense of the Cinémathèque. At this point, the issue was no longer cultural and had become political.

After long negotiations, on April 22, a special meeting of the general assembly of the Cinémathèque was called and voted to reinstate Langlois, with the approval of Malraux who also pulled the government's representatives from the assembly but in exchange cut public funding to a minimum.

== The Festival ==
The festival opened on May 10 with the 70 mm restored version of Gone with the Wind, directed by Victor Fleming. American film actress and Princess of Monaco, Grace Kelly served as the host of the opening and closing ceremonies.

Personalities of French cinema were sensitive to the demonstrations which were taking place in Paris. On the night of May 10 to May 11, violent clashes between students and the police took place in the Latin Quarter in what became the first night of the barricades. Following these incidents, the French Critics Association issued a statement asking the participants of the festival to join the demonstration of support for striking students scheduled on May 13 and called for the suspension of the festival and for those in Cannes to support the students in their "protest against the violent police repression which is an assault on the nation's cultural liberty, the secular traditions of its universities and its democratic principles". However, the organization refused.

On May 17, in Paris the États généraux du cinéma, a general assembly of cinema professionals, called for the Cannes Festival to be stopped. Peter Lennon's documentary Rocky Road to Dublin was screened at the festival. It was the last film to be shown.

The next day on May 18, a panel discussion of the members of the Committee for the Defense of the Cinémathèque was organized to discuss the Langlois affair, with the presence of directors Jean-Luc Godard, Jean-Gabriel Albicocco, Claude Berri and actor Jean-Pierre Léaud. The discussions were lively and François Truffaut, who had arrived from Paris the day before, explained that while the trains are blocked and the factories on strike, it would be ridiculous to continue the festival. Jean-Luc Godard believed that with this interruption, the cinema will show its solidarity with the student movements. Claude Lelouch, Jean-Claude Carrière, actress Macha Méril as well as jury members Louis Malle and Roman Polanski, joined them to announce in a press conference in the salle Jean Cocteau at the old Palais Croisette that, in solidarity with the workers and the students who were protesting across France, the festival had to be put to an end. Subsequently, Louis Malle, Monica Vitti, Roman Polanski, and Terence Young resigned from the international jury while Alain Resnais, Claude Lelouch, Carlos Saura, and Miloš Forman asked for the withdrawal of their films of the competition. Louis Malle announced that "the jury is out of state to work".

Polanski was skeptical of these measures because those methods reminded him of what Communists did in his native Poland but ended up supporting the annulment of that year's festival. Also, jury member Robert Rozhdestvensky, a poet from the Soviet Union, considered the idea of cancelling the festival so heinous that he even refused to attend the emergency jury meeting. Director Robert Favre Le Bret claimed: "We will close the festival tomorrow at midday".

That same evening, Peppermint Frappé by Carlos Saura, was the only film pending to be screened. Saura, accompanied by his then girlfriend and protagonist of the film, Geraldine Chaplin, did not want his own film to be watched. However, despite his total opposition the projection began. Saura and Chaplin jumped onstage and yelled asking not to start the projector to the audience's shock. As Favre Le Bret gave the order to open the big curtain that covered the screen, Saura and Chaplin decided to hung on from the curtains to prevent them from pulling back. At this point, they were joined by Truffaut and Godard. The film was not shown and this started a heated discussion and then a physical altercation with the audience who wanted to watch the film.

As a punishment for all his actions, Truffaut was later declared persona non grata by the organization. Finally on May 19 at 12 p.m. and five days before the established end of the festival, the board of directors led by Robert Favre Le Bret voted unanimously to cancel this edition, not awarding any prize. From the 28 films that were selected to compete for the Grand Prix du Festival International du Film, only 11 were screened.

== Juries ==
=== Main Competition ===
- André Chamson, French writer - Jury President
- Claude Aveline, French writer
- Paul Cadeac d'Arbaud, French
- Veljko Bulajić, Yugoslavian filmmaker
- Jean Lescure, French writer
- Louis Malle, French filmmaker
- Jan Nordlander, Swedish
- Roman Polanski, Polish filmmaker
- Robert Rozhdestvensky, Soviet poet and songwriter
- Monica Vitti, Italian actress
- Boris von Borresholm, West-German
- Terence Young, British filmmaker

== Official selection ==
=== In Competition ===
The following films were due to compete for the Grand Prix du Festival International du Film:

English title	Original title	Director(s)	Production country
24 Hours in the Life of a Woman	Vingt-Quatre Heures de la vie d'une femme	Dominique Delouche	France, West Germany
Black Jesus	Seduto alla sua destra	Valerio Zurlini	Italy
Anna Karenina	Анна Каренина	Aleksandr Zarkhi	Soviet Union
Bandits in Milan	Banditi a Milano	Carlo Lizzani	Italy
Charlie Bubbles		Albert Finney	United Kingdom
Capricious Summer	Rozmarné léto	Jiří Menzel	Czechoslovakia
The Castle	Das Schloß	Rudolf Noelte	West Germany
Come Play with Me	Grazie, zia	Salvatore Samperi	Italy
The Confrontation	Fényes szelek	Miklós Jancsó	Hungary
Doctor Glas	Doktor Glas	Mai Zetterling	Denmark, Sweden
The Firemen's Ball	Hoří, Má Panenko	Miloš Forman	Czechoslovakia
Les Gauloises bleues		Michel Cournot	France
The Girl on a Motorcycle	La Motocyclette	Jack Cardiff	United Kingdom, France
Here We Go Round the Mulberry Bush		Clive Donner	United Kingdom
Je t'aime, je t'aime		Alain Resnais	France
Joanna		Mike Sarne	United Kingdom
Kuroneko	藪の中の黒猫	Kaneto Shindo	Japan
The Long Day's Dying		Peter Collinson	United Kingdom
Matthew's Days	Żywot Mateusza	Witold Leszczyński	Poland
Peppermint Frappé		Carlos Saura	Spain
Petulia		Richard Lester	United States
Playing Soldiers	Mali vojnici	Bahrudin Čengić	Yugoslavia
The Protagonists	I protagonisti	Marcello Fondato	Italy
The Red and the White	Csillagosok, katonák	Miklós Jancsó	Soviet Union, Hungary
A Report on the Party and the Guests	O slavnosti a hostech	Jan Němec	Czechoslovakia
Tevye and His Seven Daughters	טוביה ושבע בנותיו	Menahem Golan	Israel
Trilogy		Frank Perry	United States
The Upthrown Stone	Feldobott kö	Sándor Sára	Hungary

=== Out of Competition ===
The following films were selected to be screened out of competition:

English title	Original title	Director(s)	Production country
Gone with the Wind (1939) (opening film)		Victor Fleming	United States
Spirits of the Dead	Histoires extraordinaires / Tre passi nel delirio	Roger Vadim, Louis Malle and Federico Fellini	France, Italy

== Parallel sections ==
=== International Critics' Week ===
The following feature films were selected to be screened for the 7th International Critics' Week (7e Semaine de la Critique):

- Angèle (Quatre d’entre elles) by Yves Yersin (Switzerland)
- Concerto pour un exil by Désiré Ecaré (France, Ivory Coast)
- The Edge by Robert Kramer (United States)
- Les enfants de Néant by Michel Brault (France)
- Falling Leaves (Giorgobistve) by Otar Iosseliani (Soviet Union)
- How Long Does a Man Live? (Meddig él az ember?) by Judit Elek (Hungary)
- Marie pour mémoire by Philippe Garrel (France)
- On Paper Wings (Na papirnatih avionih) by Matjaz Klopcic (Yugoslavia)
- The Queen by Frank Simon (United States)
- Rocky Road to Dublin by Peter Lennon (Ireland)

Not presented because of the interruption of the festival:

- Chronik der Anna Magdalena Bach by Jean-Marie Straub (West Germany)
- Revolution by Jack O’Connell (United States)

== Aftermath ==
The protests that led to the cancelling of this edition of the festival also brought some changes. On June 14, 1968, French filmmakers like François Truffaut and Louis Malle, among others, took the opportunity to found the Société des Réalisateurs de Films (SRF) with the mission of "defending artistic, moral and professional and economic freedoms of cinematographic creation and participating in the development of new structures of the cinema". In the next year's edition of the festival, it started to organize a parallel selection to the official one called Directors' Fortnight.

In the 2008 edition, forty years later, some of the works that could not be screened at the time were restored: Peppermint Frappé by Carlos Saura, 24 Hours in the Life of a Woman by Dominique Delouche, Anna Karenina by Alexandre Zarkhi and The Long Day's Dying by Peter Collinson. 13 jours en France by Claude Lelouch and François Reichenbach was also shown even though it was not part of the official selection.

== See also ==
- 20th Berlin International Film Festival

== Media ==
- Institut national de l'audiovisuel: Cannes Festival, May 1968 (commentary in French) Jean-Luc Godard, Roman Polanski, François Truffaut and Louis Malle lead the debate to answer the question: should we stop the festival? Favre le Bret Robert, President of the Festival, announces the festival closed. (duration 10′25″)
