= Desmond Clarke =

Irish author

Desmond Clark
- Born: 17 January 1942; Dublin, Ireland
- Died: 4 September 2016 (aged 74); Harold's Cross, Dublin, Ireland

Academic background
- Education: University College Cork (BS); KU Leuven (BPhil); University of Notre Dame (PhD)

Academic work
- Discipline: Philosophy
- Sub-discipline: History of philosophy Philosophy of science 17th-century philosophy
- Institutions: University College Cork

Desmond M. Clarke (17 January 1942 – 4 September 2016) was an Irish author and professor of philosophy at University College Cork (UCC). His research interests include history of philosophy and theories of science, with a specific interest in the writings of René Descartes, as well as contemporary church/state relations, human rights, and nationalism.

== Early life and education ==
Clarke was born in Dublin and earned his leaving certificate from Synge Street CBS. Clarke earned a Bachelor of Science from the University College Cork, Bachelor of Philosophy from KU Leuven, and PhD in the University of Notre Dame, where he met his future wife.

== Career ==
Clark was co-editor of the Cambridge Texts in the History of Philosophy series. He translated and wrote an introduction for the Penguin edition of Descartes' Meditations on First Philosophy. Clark retired from his position as professor of philosophy in 2007.

Clarke was the founder and a general editor of Cambridge Texts in the History of Philosophy. 76 volumes have been published with new translations of non-English texts from ancient Greek, Latin, Arabic, Hebrew, French, Italian and German.

== Personal life ==
Clarke died on 4 September 2016 at Our Lady's Hospice in the Harold's Cross suburb of Dublin.

== Publications ==
- Descartes' Concept of Scientific Explanation, in J. Cottingham, ed. Descartes (Oxford Readings in Philosophy; Oxford University Press, 1998), pp. 259–80.
- 'Nation, State and Nationality in the Irish Constitution', Ir. Law Times, 16 (1998), 252-6.
- Education, the State, and Sectarian Schools, in T. Murphy and P. Twomey, eds. Ireland's Evolving Constitution (Oxford: Hart, 1998), pp. 65–77.
- Faith and Reason in the Thought of Moise Amyraut, in A. P. Coudert, et al. eds. Judaeo-Christian Intellectual Culture in the Seventeenth Century (Dordrecht: Kluwer, 1999), pp. 145–59.
- (with C. Jones), eds. The Rights of Nations: Nations and Nationalism in a Changing World (New York: St. Martin's Press, and Cork University Press, 1999).
- René Descartes, Meditations and Other Metaphysical Writings, trans. Clarke (Penguin, 1998); René Descartes, Discourse on Method and Related Writings, trans. Clarke (Penguin, 1999).
- Causal powers and occasionalism from Descartes to Malebranche, in Stephen Gaukroger, ed. Descartes' Natural Philosophy (Routledge, 2000), 131 -48.
- Cartesianism, in W. Applebaum, ed. Encyclopedia of the Scientific Revolution (Garland, 2000), 122-24.
- 'Constitutional Bootstrapping: the Irish Nation', Ir. Law Times, 18 (2000), 74-77
- 'Nationalism, the Irish Constitution, and Multicultural Citizenship', Northern Ireland Legal Quart. 51 (2000), 100-19.
- 'Exorcising Ryle's Ghost from Cartesian Metaphysics', Philosophical Inquiry, 23 (2001), 27-36.
- Explanation, Consciousness and Cartesian Dualism, in R.E. Auxier and L.E. Hahn, eds., The Philosophy of Marjorie Grene (Library of Living Philosophers, vol. xxix). Chicago and La Salle, III.; Open Court, 2002, pp. 471–85.
- Descartes's Theory of Mind (Oxford: Clarendon Press, 2003)
- 'Pascal's Philosophy of Science' in N. Hammond, ed., The Cambridge Companion to Pascal (Cambridge University Press, 2003), 102-121.
- Descartes : A Biography (Cambridge University Press, 2005).
- French Philosophy, 1572–1675 (Oxford University Press, 2016).
