= Michael Cleary (priest) =

Irish Roman Catholic priest and radio and TV personality

Michael Cleary (23 November 1933 – 31 December 1993) was an Irish Roman Catholic priest, who also became a radio and TV personality.

Coming to public knowledge due to frequent appearances on RTE's Late Late Show, Cleary has been described in some sources as a "powerful and charismatic figure" in the Catholic Church in Ireland,. He was a magnetic personality, but seen as approachable. He presented a late-night radio phone-in show in Dublin in the 1980s and hosted his own television chat show. He also published a book about maintaining faith in the modern world. After he released two albums of songs, he was nicknamed "The Singing Priest". Cleary toured often under this moniker singing at fundraising events and cabaret shows.

After his death it was revealed that he had lived with Phyllis Hamilton and fathered two children with her, while she acted as his housekeeper. One child was adopted, the other remained with Cleary and Hamilton where they lived as a family in secret.

== Life ==
Born to Daniel Cleary, (Co. Tipperary) and Nellie Cleary (née Lavin), Co. Roscommon)). He was the only son in a family of 5 children.The family lived in Blanchardstown, Co. Dublin where his father, a publican, owned the Greyhound public house. Cleary attended Clongowes Wood College, Co. Kildare a private Jesuit boarding school. Later, Cleary attended Clonliffe College where he studied Theology. Cleary was ordained in 1958.

As an adult, he lived in Rathmines Road in Dublin. He participated in some of the social changes of the 1960s and 1970s, saying he had used drugs. He was strongly devoted to care for the poor and working on poverty and community development issues.

In the 1960s, Cleary discussed the Catholic clergy's attitudes to celibacy, sex and marriage in the Irish documentary film Rocky Road to Dublin (1967). He admitted to a personal preference for being married and having a family, but said that the role and necessary sacrifices of being a priest were a valid substitute.

Cleary had one of the highest profiles of any cleric in Ireland throughout the 1970s and 1980s. During the 1979 Papal visit to Ireland, Cleary sang to the crowd of 200,000 at Ballybrit before the Pope made his appearance. He was a powerful and charismatic figure within the church. He was particularly devoted to raising the issue of poverty in Ireland, especially in Dublin, where he worked for change in inner-city communities.

== Secret life ==
Three weeks after his death in December 1993 (from throat cancer), when it was therefore no longer liable to be sued for defamation, The Phoenix, a national news magazine, published an article alleging that Cleary had fathered a child, Ross Hamilton, with Phyllis Hamilton who had worked as his longtime housekeeper. This claim was subsequently repeated and it was suggested that it should be confirmed by DNA analysis. The remaining Cleary family who volunteered to provide their own DNA refused to acknowledge the boy, nor has any DNA evidence been forthcoming or provided by any of the claimed children. The Cleary family have also disputed claims that he had fathered two boys (both having the same mother, Phyllis Hamilton, who it is claimed also had a girl during this time by another trainee priest) and said they were in possession of blood tests and affidavits from two men who claimed to be the boys' fathers but apparently none of these were ever produced.

Cleary allegedly had a secret 26-year relationship with Hamilton that started in the 1960s when she was 17 and he was about 34. They allegedly had two sons, the first given up for adoption and the second they allegedly raised together. Hamilton was later supported by psychiatrist Ivor Browne, who also publicised her story with her consent.

In 1999, the Dublin Circuit Court held a private hearing and, based on DNA evidence, determined that Cleary was the biological father of Hamilton's son.

Paul Williams and Hamilton wrote a memoir published by Williams in 1995 called "Secret Love: My Life with Father Michael Cleary" in which Hamilton claims that they had taken marriage vows in a private ceremony with no third party present. She died in 2001 from ovarian cancer. Such a marriage ceremony, if it occurred, would not be legally binding under Irish law or canon law.

=== Aftermath ===
This followed the 1992 discovery that Bishop Eamonn Casey, also a well-known cleric in Ireland, had fathered a son (by then nearly 20) with American divorcée Annie Murphy. Casey was a friend and colleague of Cleary's and, as Cleary's confessor, had allegedly known about Cleary's relationship with Hamilton. Cleary and Hamilton did not know about the bishop's own affair and were shocked at the revelation about Casey.

These sex scandals shocked the Catholic Church laity in Ireland, although because they were between adults they were not regarded as seriously as those involving direct abuse of children. The church was strongly criticised and the controversies shook many people's faith in its clergy. There is however no evidence of widespread knowledge among the hierarchy about the personal lives of Casey or Cleary. Murphy and Hamilton appeared on the Later With Clare McKeon chat show in January 1999 to talk about their lives and relationships, adding to publicity about the longtime affairs of the clergy.

The Church allowed Hamilton and her son to continue living in Cleary's house for eleven years after his death, but then took possession after she died. The Church informed Ross Hamilton he had to leave. When he refused, the Church started legal proceedings against him, and as he had not legally established he was Cleary's son he had no right to inherit. The Church paid him £40,000 in settlement. The Church eventually sold the brick house in Mount Harold Terrace for £700,000. Hamilton brought a case in the High Court in 1996, which was eventually struck out in 2003.

=== Documentary ===
On 21 April 2008, the documentary film The Holy Show (RTE, entitled "At Home with the Clearys; also entitled "The Father, the Son & the Housekeeper) was shown on BBC One. This 90 minute film was based on footage shot when the director, Alison Millar, a friend of Cleary's niece, stayed with Cleary in his household as a student in 1991.

At the time, his true relationship with Hamilton and their children was secret.

After the scandal broke, Millar used the old footage and recent interviews with Cleary's family to examine the changing roles of the church and social changes in Ireland.

The film won several awards:

- 2008 Irish Film & Television Award for Best Single Documentary
- 2008 Prix Italia award for Best Documentary
- 2008 Boston Irish Film Festival award for Best Documentary
- 2008 Celtic Film Frank Copplestone First Time Director Award
- Nominated for 2009 BAFTA Break-Through Talent Award for director Alison Millar

Another programme, In the Name of the Father, was produced on Scannal, RTÉ One about Father Michael Cleary and his complicated life.
