= Cathal Ó Sándair =

Irish author

- Born: Charles Saunders; 15 July 1922; Weston-super-Mare, England
- Died: 18 February 1996 (aged 73)
- Occupation: Novelist
- Writing career
- Language: Irish, English
- Notable work: Na Mairbh a d'Fhill
- Website: cathalosandair.com

Charles Saunders (1922–1996), gaelicised as Cathal Ó Sándair, was one of the most prolific Irish language authors of the 20th century. An Gúm published 120 of Ó Sándair's books between 1943 and 1984. The annual award for the best book for children and young readers in the Irish language is titled Gradam Réics Carló after Ó Sándair's character of the same name.

== Biography ==
Cathal Ó Sándair was born Charles Saunders in Weston-super-Mare, England on 15 July 1922. His father, Simon Saunders, was a professional boxer from Dorset, England. He fought under the name Darkey Saunders and once fought Jimmy Wilde. His mother was from Camden Street in Dublin. His parents met in Bristol when his mother worked in a munitions factory and his father worked as a tram driver. His family moved to Ireland when he two months old. Ó Sándair attended Synge Street CBS in Dublin and Coláiste Chiaráin in Bray.

Ó Sándair joined the Irish Air Corps before moving to Louth, and joining the civil service as a customs officer. He married in 1949 and had four children with his wife. In 1954, Ó Sándair left his job in the civil service to focus on writing full time. However, by 1957, due to falling sales numbers, he struggled to support his family financially and considered emigrating to Canada. He returned to work for the civil service in 1963 and remained there until he retired in 1987.

== Literary career ==
While attending Coláiste Chiaráin, Ó Sándair published a story in the first issue of the magazine An Gael Óg in 1938 under the pen name Cuan Aoibheann. Ó Sándair's first novel for children, Tríocha Píosa Airgid, was published in 1942. Due to a post-war paper shortage, An Gúm was restricted to publishing only a small number of Ó Sándair's novels a year in the 1940s.

Na Mairbh a d’Fhill was published in 1943 and was the first novel to feature private detective Réics Carló as the main character. The book sold over 1000 copies within the first month, and ultimately 9000 copies in total despite paper shortages. Ó Sándair published 45 books featuring Réics Carló with An Gúm. An Gúm reprinted Ó Sándair's first two novels starring Réics Carló, Na Mairbh a d’Fhil and An tEitleán Dofheicthe, in 2022.

Ó Sándair wrote in a wide variety of genres. In addition to the many adventures of Réics Carló, Ó Sándair wrote a series of western novels featuring the character Réamonn Óg. A third strand of his fiction centred on school adventures where boys and girls inevitably save the day. He also wrote a science fiction series about the space-pilot Captaen Spéirling, which had certain similarities with Dan Dare.

Following his return to the civil service, Ó Sándair took a long break from writing novels in the 1960s and 70s.

Ó Sándair is reputed to have written 160 books—some of which remain unpublished—of which more than 500,000 copies have been sold.

== Partial bibliography ==
Published by An Gúm

- Na Mairbh a d’Fhill (1943)
- An tEiteallán Do-Fheicthe (1943)
- Tríocha Píosa Airgid (1943)
- Jacko agus Sgéalta Eile (1943)
- An Corpán sa Trúnc (1944)
- Dúnṃharbhú i bPáirc an Chrócaigh (1944)
- Uathbhás i mBrugh na Bóinne (1944)
- An Gluaisteán Sidhe (1945)
- Súile an Iodhail (1945)
- An Lá Geal (1945)
- An Chathair Seo 'Gainne (Ocht ngearr-scéal) (1947)
- Soir ón Rio Grande (1949)
- Réics Carló ar an nGealaigh (1950)
- Réics Carló san Aifric (1951)
- Réics Carló ar Dhá Eachtra eile (Réics Carlo ar Mhars & Dúnmharú ar an gCanáil) (1951)
- Réics Carló san Éigipt (1951)
- Bealach an Ghunna (1951)
- Buachaillí Chluain Éanna (1952)
- Réics Carló i gCairlinn (1952)
- Réics Carló i bPáris (1952)
- John Joe (1952)
- Cás-Leabhar Réics Carló (1952)
- An Buachaill Bán (1952)
- Cailiní Chluain Éanna (1952)
- Réamonn Óg ar an Rio Grande (1952)
- Fir an Iarthair Fhiain (1952)
- Réics Carló ó Sráid Fhearchair (1952)
- Cluain Éanna go Bráth (1953)
- Cluain Éanna Arís (1953)
- Iníon an Iarthair (1953)
- Réics Carló sa tSín (1953)
- Micilín (1953)
- An Triú Adambhomba (1953)
- Réics Carló agus an Maisín Fé-Thalamh (1953)
- An Bóthar go Cuailgne (1953)
- Réics Carló sa Bhreasail (1953)
- Bliain ón mBás (1953)
- Réics Carló sna Stáit Aontaithe (1953)
- An Stróinséir ó Théacsas (1953)
- An tIndiach ó Éirinn (1953)
- Réics Carló agus Rún an Iarnróid Dúnta (1953)
- Réics Carló agus Cás an Amhránaí Sráide (1953)
- Réics Carló agus an Cró-Dheamhan (1954)
- Réics Carló i Londain (1954)
- Cuir Fios ar Réics Carló (1954)
- Réamonn Óg, Sirriam (1954)
- Réics Carló agus Ridire an Chaisleáin Duibh (1954)
- Réics Carló agus Mistéire na nÉan gan Sciatháin (1954)
- Uafás i gCluain Éanna (1954)
- Réamonn Óg Arís (1954)
- Réamonn Óg ar a Choimeád (1954)
- Cailíní Chluain Éanna agus Fear an Chlóca Dhuibh (1954)
- Buachaillí Chluain Éanna agus an Spiaire ón Spéir (1954)
- Réics Carló, Taighdeálaí Príobháideach (1954)
- Réamonn Óg i nGleann an Bháis (1954)
- Réamonn Óg, Cara na nIndiach (1955)
- Réics Carló i Meicsicó (1955)
- Cluain Éanna Arís (1955)
- Réics Carló agus Mistéire an Chuain (1955)
- Mistéir na Scoile ar Muir (1955)
- Réics Carló agus an Mhaidhm Bháite (1955)
- Réics Carló agus Cás an Cháilín Fhuadaithe (1955)
- Réics Carló i bPort Láirge (1955)
- Réics Carló agus Cás an Mhilliúnaí Mhairbh (1955)
- Réics Carló agus Mistéire na Loinge Sí (1955)
- Faoi Bhratach an Bháis (1955)
- Sorcha Ghlionnáin agus Ballaí Indreabháín (1955)
- Réamonn Óg agus Díoltas an Indiaigh (1955)
- Cuir Fios ar Réamonn Óg (1955)
- Réamonn Óg ó Lodestone (1955)
- Buachaillí Chluain Éanna agus an Mac Léinn is Raimhre ar Bith (1955)
- Réics Carló i nDún na nGall (1956)
- Réics Carló i gContae Mhuineacháin (1956)
- Réics Carló i nDún Dealgán (1956)
- Réics Carló agus Mistéire an Oileáin (1956)
- Réics Carló i gContae Chill Mantáin (1956)
- An tSeamhróigín Dhilís (1956)
- An Sean-Siopa Dorcha (1956)
- Réamonn Óg agus Indiagh ar an Teorainn (1956)
- Cuir Fios ar Scorach Ghlionnáin (1956)
- Réamonn Óg agus Rí an Mhachaire (1956)
- An Captaen Toirneach ar an Meánmhuir (1956)
- An Captaen Toirneach ar Eachtra Eile (1956)
- Mo Chara, mo Namhaid (1967)
- Captaen Toirneach agus Ór-Thaisce na Spáínnach (1956)
- Réics Carló i gCorcaigh (1956)
- Réamonn Óg agus Marcaigh na hOíche (1957)
- Réamonn Óg agus Éirí-Amach na nIndiach (1957)
- Réamonn Óg agus Marcaigh Ghleann an Bháis (1957)
- Réics Carló Arís (1957)
- Scorach Ghlionnáin ó Chonamara (1957)
- An Captaen Toirneach Arís (1957)
- Réics Carló agus an Fear do bhí Ró-Saibhir (1957)
- An Chéad Bhliain i gCluain Éanna (1959)
- Faoi Sheol leis an gCaptaen Toirneach (1959)
- Réamonn Óg, Sirriam gan Eagla (1959)
- Réamonn Óg agus an tÓr-Mhianach Caillte (1959)
- Díoltas Réamonn Óg (1959)
- Réamonn Óg agus an Marcach Dubh (1960)
- Le Columbus go Meiriceá (1960)
- Réamonn Óg agus Ór an Sprionlóra (1960)
- An Captaen Spéirling agus an Plainéad do Phléasc (1960)
- Réamonn Óg, Namhaid na mBithúnach (1960)
- Réamonn Óg an Bó-bhuachaill Bómanta (1960)
- Eachtraí Buachaillí Chluain Éanna (1960)
- An Captaen Spéirling Arís (1960)
- Leis an gCaptaen Spéirling go Mars (1961)
- Eachtra Dheireannach Réamonn Óig (1961)
- An Sean-Siopa Dorcha (1961)
- Captaen Spéirling, Spás-Phíolóta (1962)
- An Campa sna Sléibhte (1962)
- Íobairt Sheáin (1962)
- An Príosúnach (1962)
- Prionsa, Rí na Madraí (1963)
- Mo Chara, mo Namhaid (1964)
- Ar Son a Charad (1964)
- Mo Mhadra Prionsa (1964)
- Rún m’Athar (1964)
- An Clódóir Óg (1964)
- Mo Ghaiscíoch, Micheál (1965)
- Prionsa an tSléibhe (1965)
- Prionsa Arís (1965)
- Uafás I mBrú na Bóinne (1970) Reprint
- An Glór Glé Glinn Fadó (1980)
- Fáilte ar Ais, a Réics (1981)
- Réics Carló ar Oileán Mhanainn (1984)
- An Glór Glé Glinn Fadó, Foilseachain Abhair Spioradalta (FS), Baile Átha Cliath, 1980
- Reks Carlo Ayns Mannin (2006 Manx translation of Réics Carló ar Oileán Mhanainn)

In English as Cahill O'Sandair

- Introducing Ambrose, Catholic Truth Society of Ireland, Dublin, 1950
- Ambrose and the Parrot, Irish Messenger Office, Dublin, 1951
- Ambrose and the Phantom, Irish Messenger Office, Dublin, 1951
- Pat Sees the Truth, Irish Messenger Office, Dublin, 1951

In English As Desmond Reid

- Bullets are Trumps, Amalgamated Press, London, 1961 (Sexton Blake Library #488)
