= James Sanfey =

Irish politician and soldier (died 2000)

Senator
- In office 1 June 1973 – 27 October 1977
- Constituency: Nominated by the Taoiseach

Personal details
- Born: June 1922 Dublin, Ireland
- Died: 2 April 2000 (aged 77) Dublin, Ireland
- Party: Fine Gael
- Spouse: Gabrielle Robins (m. 1950)
- Children: 4
- Education: Synge Street CBS

James W. Sanfey (June 1922 – 2 April 2000) was an Irish Fine Gael politician and Army Commandant. He was a member of Seanad Éireann from 1973 to 1977. He was nominated by the Taoiseach to the 13th Seanad in 1973. He did not contest the 1977 Seanad election.

Sanfey was born in Dublin in June 1922 and grew up in Curzon Street, off the South Circular Road. He was educated at Synge Street CBS and at the Irish Military College at the Curragh Camp.

He died on 2 April 2000, aged 77.
