= Jim Cooke =

Irish teacher of maths and physics

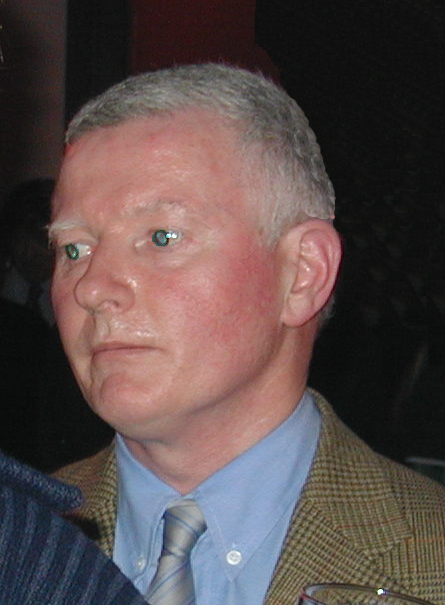
Photo of Jim Cooke at the Synge Street PPU Reunion dinner 2004

Jim Cooke is a retired science teacher from Dublin, Ireland. He taught primarily physics, but also maths, science and applied maths.

He was educated at Synge Street CBS, and taught there for nearly 40 years. During his time there, he achieved unrivalled acclaim for his mentoring of students through the Young Scientist competition including two overall winners and three 2nd places. He also mentored Abdusalam Abubakar to a First in Mathematics at the European Union Contest for Young Scientists in 2007.

In 2009 he mentored his student Andrei Triffio to winning the Intel Student Award in Physics, Chemistry and Mathematics at the Young Scientists Exhibition. The prize for the award was an all-expenses paid trip to Intel International Science and Engineering Fair in Nevada to represent Ireland in the event, where he was placed third in the world overall.

Cooke retired from teaching in 2009.

== Awards ==
- 2012 - European Union Special Recognition of Achievement for Inspiring Students in Science
- 2009 - Engineers Ireland Annual Award for Science, Engineering and Technology Awareness
- 2005 - Victor W Graham Perpetual Trophy Winner for outstanding achievement in Applied Mathematics
