= Les Gauloises bleues =

1968 film directed by Michel Cournot

- Directed by: Michel Cournot
- Written by: Michel Cournot
- Produced by: Georges Dancigers; Claude Lelouch; Alexandre Mnouchkine
- Starring: Annie Girardot
- Cinematography: Alain Levent
- Edited by: Agnès Guillemot
- Release date: 29 August 1968 (France)
- Running time: 93 minutes
- Country: France
- Language: French
- Box office: $2,712,645

Les Gauloises bleues is a 1968 French drama film directed by Michel Cournot. It was listed to compete at the 1968 Cannes Film Festival, but the festival was cancelled due to the events of May 1968 in France.

== Cast ==
- Annie Girardot – La mère
- Jean-Pierre Kalfon – Ivan à 30 ans
- Nella Bielski – Jeanne
- Bruno Cremer – Le père
- Georges Demestre – Ivan à 6 ans
- Anne Wiazemsky – L'infirmière
- Tanya Lopert – La Mort
- Karina Gondy – L'assistante sociale
- Henri Garcin – L'ambulancier rabatteur
- Tsilla Chelton – La directrice
- Liza Braconnier – Infirmière
- Jean Lescot – Un chasseur
- Marcello Pagliero – Le marchand bohémien
- François Périer – Le juge
- José Varela – Le juriste
