= Jarlath Hayes =

Irish typographer (1924–2001)

- Born: Jarlath Fabian Hayes; September 11, 1924; Dublin, County Dublin, Irish Free State
- Died: May 17, 2001 (aged 76); Republic of Ireland
- Education: Synge Street CBS
- Occupations: Graphic designer Book designer Typographer
- Years active: 1945-2001
- Notable work: Tuam Uncial font

Jarlath Fabian Hayes (11 September 1924 — 17 May 2001) was an Irish typographer and graphic designer.

== Family and education ==
Jarlath Hayes was the fourth of six children of Richard and Lilian Hayes. His father was an accountant in Dublin. He attended Synge Street Christian Brothers School. Hayes was married to Oonagh with whom he had a son Dara and four daughters, Susan, Hilary, Ruth and Bronwyn.

Aged 76 when he died, Hayes was survived by his wife and their five children.

== Career ==
In 1945, he began his career in the advertising industry, working in O'Kennedy-Brindley and O'Keeffe's Advertising. Hayes taught advertising design part-time at the Rathmines Technical Institute. In 1958 he co-founded the Institute of Creative Advertising and Design with Talbot Kelly and was its president from 1964 to 1966. In 1963, he founded Group 3 Design with two other designers. In 1967, he received the McConnell's Award for helping students.

From 1970, Hayes worked as a freelance graphic artist, later with his daughter, Susan. He lived and worked in Stillorgan, County Dublin (now Dún Laoghaire–Rathdown). The focus of his work was typography and book design. Between 1973 and 1986 Hayes worked on book design for several Irish publishers, such as, Dolman Press, Gill & Macmillan, Four Courts Press and The Lilliput Press.

As a typographer, he worked intensively on striving for the “perfect” serif font. His Tuam Uncial was produced by Letraset's dry-transfer lettering system. It was known to Irish television viewers having been used in the credits of the long-running television series Glenroe, broadcast by RTÉ One for 18 seasons. In Ireland, the font is also used in outdoor advertising and was utilised on album covers by the Irish band Clannad. In May 2020, after about thirty years since most design moved to digital format when a digital version of Hayes' font was made available.

The design of the Irish commemorative stamp issued in 1995 for the 50th anniversary of the founding of the United Nations was done by Hayes. He is more well-known abroad for his design of the Celtic harp on the national side of the Irish euro coins that has been in use since 2002.
