= Michel Cournot =

French writer, journalist, screenwriter and film director (1922-2007)

- Born: 1 May 1922; Paris, France
- Died: 8 February 2007 (aged 84); Paris, France
- Occupations: Journalist, screenwriter, film director
- Years active: 1961–1988

Michel Cournot (French pronunciation: [miʃɛl kuʁno]; 1 May 1922 – 8 February 2007) was a French journalist, screenwriter and film director. As a writer he was awarded the Fénéon Prize in 1949 for Martinique. His only film as a director, Les Gauloises bleues, was due to be entered at the 1968 Cannes Film Festival, but the festival was cancelled because of the events of May 1968 in France.

He received a Genie Award nomination for Best Original Screenplay at the 10th Genie Awards in 1989, as cowriter with Claude Fournier and Marie-José Raymond of the Canadian television miniseries The Mills of Power (Les Tisserands du pouvoir).

== Selected filmography ==
- Les Gauloises bleues (1968)
