= Basil Payne =

Irish author (1923–2012)

Basil Payne (23 June 1923 – 6 January 2012) was an Irish poet and lecturer.

== Life ==
Basil Payne, poet and performer, was born on 23 June 1923 at Holles Street maternity hospital, Dublin, one of seven children (four boys and three girls) of Michael Francis Payne, a chauffeur, and his wife Annie (née Hanvey). A third-generation Dubliner, his family background was working class and Catholic. On their marriage, his parents had moved to 48 Greenville Terrace, just off Dublin's South Circular Road, where Basil grew up. An inquisitive child, he took note of his surroundings and stored up simple memories of 'a red brick house near the canal ... a slaughter house in Harold's Cross' and other such 'decisive landmarks' that would later feature in his poetry ('Landmarks', Payne (1961), 9). After attending the local Synge Street CBS, he began working as a clerk in a shipping company while taking night classes at University College Dublin to study for an arts degree.

Having lost his father at a young age, Payne was close to his mother, and spoke fondly of her as a woman who 'sang all day, right around the clock ... except during meal times' (poetry reading, National Concert Hall, 1974). Her endless singing instilled in him a love of music, particularly that of Mozart, which he cultivated throughout his life, playing over and over again the piano concerto no. 20 in D minor. His relationship with his father, 'who chain-smoked from limousine to dusky death' (ibid.), was for Payne, in retrospect, a sad one. In his short story 'Five albatrosses, a great Irish elk, and a grave in Glasnevin', Payne looks back in regret at the way he and his siblings denied their father the love he deserved by making 'mother the shrine' of their lives. Yet he was never in any doubt that his 'mild tempered, bald bespectacled' father loved him. Such burning regrets prevented him from visiting his father's grave in Glasnevin Cemetery until 1974, thirty-two years after the death. He had already written a poignant tribute, 'Lines in memory of my father', in which he reflects: 'Fishing, one morning early in July, from the canal bank – that was the closest ever, we came to entering each other's world' (Payne (1971), 5).

On completion of his studies Payne began writing short stories and poems, and towards the end of the 1940s was a regular contributor to magazines such as the Irish Bookman and Poetry Ireland. He also began reviewing books and plays for the Irish Times, and in 1956 gained attention when he wrote an amusing epitaph in that newspaper for a controversial but short-lived monument on O'Connell Bridge, known to Dubliners as 'the tomb of the unknown gurrier': 'The City Fathers' grim myopia / Confines me in this non-Utopia / To reinforce their sentiment / They bury me in thick cement' (Irish Times, 28 January 2012).

By the end of the 1950s, his growing reputation in Irish literary circles was such that his marriage (8 September 1958) to Monessa Keating in St Joseph's church, Terenure, was announced in the national newspapers. After marriage he began working for the Voluntary Health Insurance (VHI), a new, up-and-coming company, having caught the attention of its board by writing an original paper on the concept of health insurance in Ireland. He is usually credited with having suggested the company's name. He carved out a successful VHI career, rising to senior management, while continuing to write, and in 1961 published his first book of poetry, Sunlight on a square. This collection of ten years' work recalls some of the places and characters he encountered as a child growing up in Dublin. He won the prestigious Guinness International poetry prize in 1964 for his poem Enemies – described as 'an ironic reminiscence of an anti-nationalist childhood' (Irish Press, 9 July 1964) – and repeated the feat in 1966.

Having established himself as an internationally recognised poet, in 1971 he resigned from the VHI to become a full-time writer. He published a second collection of poetry, Love in the afternoon (1971), which was generally well reviewed, as was most of his other work; critics praised its accessibility, humanity and insightful celebration of the everyday. Payne also translated poetry from French and German, and was an incisive critic, contributing regularly to literary and cultural journals. A keen admirer of Patrick Kavanagh, in 1960 he published an essay in the Jesuit periodical Studies reassessing Kavanagh's work after the publication that year of Come dance with Kitty Stobling; he particularly praised the cathartic value of Kavanagh's poetry. Payne believed in audience participation, where the audience, by reflecting on the thoughts and views of the poet, become themselves fellow poets. He believed, as his son Cyprian put it, that "a poet's job was to act not as an oracle, but as a catalyst" (The Guardian, 5 February 2012).

He wrote theatre and film reviews for the Irish Times and RTÉ Radio during the 1970s, and in 1973 performed a one-man stage show, In Dublin's quare city, to great acclaim at the Peacock Theatre, recalling 'with deep love and feeling' the vanishing Dublin of his childhood around the South Circular Road. His recital included vibrant descriptions of the street musicians and traders, the children's rhymes, his mother's singing in the kitchen, his father holding his hand in the museum, the eccentric Pressingham sisters, and the 'four-faced liar' clock tower of Wellington Barracks.

In 1996, Payne took umbrage at the publication of Seamus Heaney's collection, The spirit level, suggesting that Heaney had 'borrowed' his title from an earlier poem by Payne entitled Little Jerusalem revisited: "For death the leveller is death the spirit-level". In 1971, Payne released his second book of poetry: Love in the afternoon (Gill and MacMillan, 1971). This contained a poem, entitled Poem, which explicitly mocked Heaney's style.

Having previously lectured for one summer in a Californian university, he moved to the United States with his wife and family in 1974 and lectured in English literature at several New Jersey colleges and universities, including Rutgers. After a spell as writer in residence at Glassboro State College (latterly, Rowan University), New Jersey, he moved west to take up a new visiting lectureship at the University of California, but the job fell through. The family returned to Dublin in 1977.

Payne continued with his writing, interrupting it occasionally to perform his popular one-man stage shows. Poetry collections included Another kind of optimism (1974), Voyage à deux (1974), Why are there so many blind people in Philadelphia? (1979), Aspects of love (1979) and Dark and Light Fantastic (1998). Among his notable stage performances were My Dublin, my America (1975), A tale of five cities (1980), A Dublin childhood (1983), Be free with me (1985), A man like any other (1986) and Songs of love (1989).

In the 1980s, Payne focused on his one-man stage shows, which he performed occasionally in Canada, Germany, France, Belgium and Hong Kong, and at various arts festivals and summer schools throughout Ireland. He suffered increasingly from depression and became somewhat reclusive, living alone from the mid-1980's. By the turn of the century, Payne, now in his seventies, no longer performed and his public profile had diminished.

In 2009, he was diagnosed with the end stages of Alzheimer's disease, and a year later with cerebrovascular disease. He died in Orwell House Nursing Home, Rathgar, Dublin, on 6 January 2012. Predeceased by his wife in 2003, he was survived by his seven children, Cyprian, Norbert, Lucy, Gregory, Bernard, Michael and Christophe. He is buried under a large yew tree, in Mount Jerome Cemetery, Dublin.

== Published works ==
- Sunlight on a Square (Dublin, John Augustin, 1961, republished on Amazon Kindle, 2012);
- Love in the Afternoon (Dublin, Gill and MacMillan, 1971);
- Another Kind of Optimism (Dublin, Gill and MacMillan, 1974);
- Dark and Light Fantastic (Amazon Kindle, 2013)
