= Thomas Williams (Irish cricketer) =

Irish cricketer

Personal information
- Full name: Thomas Christopher Williams
- Born: 13 December 1908; Dublin, Ireland
- Died: 14 August 1982 (aged 73); Clonmel, Munster, Ireland
- Batting: Left-handed
- Bowling: Leg break Right-arm medium

Domestic team information
- Years: Team
- 1939: Ireland

Career statistics
Competition	First-class
Matches	1
Runs scored	25
Batting average	12.50
100s/50s	–/–
Top score	23
Balls bowled	89
Wickets	1
Bowling average	50.00
5 wickets in innings	–
10 wickets in match	–
Best bowling	1/36
Catches/stumpings	2/–
- Source: Cricinfo, 1 November 2018

Thomas Christopher Williams (13 December 1908 – 14 August 1982) was an Irish first-class cricketer.

Williams was born at Dublin in December 1908, where he was educated in the city at Synge Street CBS. Initially playing his club cricket for Pembroke, Williams debuted for Ireland in a minor match against the Marylebone Cricket Club in 1937. He later made a single appearance in first-class cricket for Ireland against Scotland at Dublin in 1939. Batting twice in the match, Williams scored 23 runs in Ireland's first-innings, before he was dismissed by William Laidlaw; in their second-innings he was dismissed by William Dippie for 2 runs. He also took a single wicket during the match, dismissing John Farquhar in Scotland's first-innings, with match figures of 1/50. He was employed by Bulmers Irish Cider, with his work commitments necessitating a move from Dublin to Clonmel in County Tipperary, where he played club cricket for Cahir Park Cricket Club. He died at Clonmel in August 1982.
