= Xclusive Magazine =

- Editor: Peter Anny-Nzekwue
- Categories: Lifestyle magazine
- Frequency: Monthly
- First issue: March 2006
- Final issue Number: - -
- Country: Ireland
- Website: www.xclusive.ie

Xclusive Magazine is an Ireland multicultural lifestyle magazine.

== About ==
Xclusive Magazine was started in March 2006. It is published by Peter Anny-Nzekwue during the first week of every month.
