= Peter Lennon =

Irish journalist and film director

Peter Gerard Lennon (28 February 1930 – 18 March 2011) was an Irish journalist and film director, probably best known as director of the social history documentary film Rocky Road to Dublin. He worked for The Guardian newspaper for many years.

== Personal life ==
Born in Dublin to an alcoholic father and pious mother, Lennon was educated at Synge Street CBS before starting work in a bank, where he also freelanced as a music critic for the Irish Press.

As well as The Guardian, Lennon wrote for publications such as The Listener, the BBC magazine.

Peter Lennon had been married since 1962 to the Finnish journalist and lawyer Eeva Lennon (née Karikoski).

== Rocky Road to Dublin ==
Based in Paris for The Guardian, Lennon was assigned by his newspaper to cover the Dublin Film Festival in the mid-1960s. His local friends tried to convince him that Ireland had changed socially and Lennon set out to document these changes. His investigations though demonstrated the opposite, that censorship, insularity and the dominance of the clergy still prevailed. He wrote a series of articles as a result and followed this up with Rocky Road to Dublin which was shot over 16 days on a budget of £20,000.

== Death ==
He died of cancer in 2011 in London.
