= Cyprus University of Technology =

Technical school in Limassol, Cyprus

Coordinates: 34°40′36″N 33°02′39″E

- Greek: Τεχνολογικό Πανεπιστήμιο Κύπρου Turkish: Kıbrıs Teknoloji Üniversitesi
- Type: Public
- Established: 2004
- Affiliations: UNIMED, IAU, EUA
- Rector: Panayiotis Zaphiris
- Academic staff: 250
- Students: 3,000
- Undergraduates: 2,000
- Postgraduates: 1,000
- Location: Limassol, Limassol District, Cyprus
- Website: www.cut.ac.cy

The Cyprus University of Technology (CUT) (Greek: Τεχνολογικό Πανεπιστήμιο Κύπρου or "ΤΕ.ΠΑ.Κ.") is a university established in 2004. Its first intake of students took place in the academic year 2007–08. The establishment of CUT is an attempt to fill in gaps that still exist within Cyprus' higher education by offering degrees in undergraduate and postgraduate levels that are not offered by the University of Cyprus or by other higher education institutions.

It is based in Limassol, the second largest city in Cyprus. It was officially inaugurated in September 2007 by then-President of Cyprus, Tassos Papadopoulos.

== University rankings ==
University rankings
- Cyprus University of Technology

Global – Overall
- QS World: =686 (2026)
- THE World: 501-600 (2026)

Regional – Overall
- QS Emerging Europe and Central Asia: 102 (2022)

According to recent international rankings, Cyprus University of Technology is ranked among the top 300-350 Universities in the Times Higher Education World University Rankings 2018-2019.

== Faculties and Departments ==
The University consists of seven Faculties and a Language Center:

- Faculty of Geotechnical Sciences and Environmental Management
  - Department of Agricultural Sciences, Biotechnology and Food Science
  - Chemical Engineering Programme in collaboration with the Department of Engineering and Technology
- Faculty of Management and Economics
  - Department of Hotel and Tourism Management
  - Department of Commerce, Finance and Shipping
  - Interdisciplinary Management Programme
- Faculty of Communication and Media Studies
  - Department of Communication and Internet Studies
  - Department of Communication and Marketing
- Faculty of Health Sciences
  - Department of Nursing
  - Department of Rehabilitation Sciences
  - Cyprus International Institute for Environmental and Public Health
- Faculty of Fine and Applied Arts
  - Department of Multimedia and Graphic Arts
  - Department of Fine Arts
- Faculty of Engineering and Technology
  - Department of Electrical Engineering, Computer Engineering and Informatics
  - Department of Mechanical Engineering and Materials Science and Engineering
  - Department of Civil Engineering and Geomatics
- Faculty of Tourism Management, Hospitality and Entrepreneurship
  - Department of Management, Entrepreneurship and Digital Business
  - Department of Hospitality and Tourism Management
  - Academy of Hospitality and Tourism
- Simos Menardos Language Centre

== International relations ==
The Cyprus University of Technology is one of the nine holders of the European University of Technology, EUt+, together with:

- Riga Technical University (Latvia),
- Technical University of Sofia (Bulgaria),
- Darmstadt University of Applied Sciences (Germany),
- Technological University Dublin (Ireland),
- Polytechnic University of Cartagena (Spain),
- University of Technology of Troyes (France),
- Technical University of Cluj-Napoca (Romania),
- University of Cassino and Southern Lazio (Italy).

== Notable alumni ==
- Milan Trajkovic, Cypriot hurdler
