= Riga Technical University =

Technical university in Latvia

Coordinates: 56.9472°N 24.1047°E

- Rīgas Tehniskā universitāte
- Former name: Riga Polytechnical Institute (1862–1918)
- Type: Public
- Established: 1862; 164 years ago
- Affiliations: EUA, AESOP, BSRUN, BALTECH, NORDTEK, EUt+, NAFSA, APAIE, ASM
- Budget: EUR 85,339,354 (2021)
- Rector: Tālis Juhna
- Academic staff: 882 (2022)
- Students: 10,689 (headcount 2022, 22% foreign nationals)
- Undergraduates: 7696 (2022)
- Postgraduates: 2993 (2022)
- Location: Ķīpsalas Street 6A, Riga, Latvia
- Campus: 11.8 hectares (29 acres); Urban
- Colours: Dark green
- Website: rtu.lv

University rankings

Global – Overall
- QS World: 761-770 (2026)

Regional – Overall
- QS Emerging Europe and Central Asia: 57 (2022)

Riga Technical University (RTU) (Latvian: Rīgas Tehniskā universitāte) is the oldest technical university in the Baltic countries established on October 14, 1862. It is located in Riga, Latvia and was previously known as Riga Polytechnical Institute and Riga Polytechnicum.

In 1958, the Riga Polytechnic Institute was established as a separate institution, separating the departments of engineering from the Latvian State University. Over the years, the Riga Polytechnic Institute evolved and expanded its academic offerings, becoming one of the leading technical universities in the region. In 1990, it was renamed Riga Technical University (RTU), and today, it has nine faculties and is the largest STEM-oriented university in Latvia.

In the 2022 QS EECA university rankings, RTU was ranked 57th among the universities in Eastern Europe and Central Asia.

== History ==
=== Riga Polytechnical Institute (1862–1918) ===
Riga Polytechnicum was first established in 1862 and was the first polytechnical institute in Imperial Russia. It offered degrees in agriculture, chemistry, engineering, mechanics, trade and architecture, with education in German.

In addition to four technical faculties (architecture, engineering, mechanical engineering, chemistry), the polytechnic also included an agricultural and a commercial faculty. The first lecturers came from German Empire, Switzerland and Austria-Hungary. The language of instruction was German.

Between 1863 and 1869, the number of students increased from sixteen to ninety. The establishment of a faculty of architecture at the Polytechnicum in 1869 was instrumental in providing Riga with a group of locally trained architects, with consequences for the development of the characteristic Art Nouveau architecture in Riga.

In 1869 the polytechnic moved into a new building. Since there was a lack of technical universities in Russia, many students – especially from the Baltic Sea governments – had gone to study at ETH Zurich, Karlsruhe Institute of Technology, TU Dresden and Leibniz University Hannover. This trend began to shift after January 1, 1874 when Alexander II of Russia introduced general conscription. Under this policy, all men from the age of 21 had to serve fifteen years, six in the Imperial Russian Army and nine in the reserve. For graduates of the Russian university who wanted to study, the period of service was only six months. This difference led to a significant increase in student numbers. At the beginning of the academic year 1874/75, 59 students enrolled, the total student body comprised 201 members.

In the course of Russification, Nicholas II of Russia nationalized the university by decree of May 6, 1896. From 1896 to 1918 it was renamed the Riga Polytechnical Institute (Rīgas Politehniskais institūts – RPI) and the language of instruction was changed to Russian.

The number of students continued to increase, reaching 2088 students in 1913/14. In 1918/19 the Polytechnic was called the Baltic Technical University (Baltijas Tehniskā augstskola).

When World War I started in 1914, the Riga Polytechnical Institute was evacuated to Moscow, where it operated until 1918. After that, part of the faculty then returned to Latvia and joined the newly established University of Latvia.

In 1919, the university was incorporated as a technical faculty of the Latvian University of Applied Sciences (Latvijas Augstskola, since 1923: University of Latvia), which was founded after independence. On September 1, 1958, their technical faculties were spun off again and raised to an independent university. From 1958 to 1983 it was called the Riga Polytechnic Institute, and then renamed the Arvīds Pelše Institute of Technology in Riga (Latvian: Arvīda Pelšes vārdā nosauktais Rīgas politehniskais institūts). In the mid-1970s, the university became the largest university in the Latvian Soviet Socialist Republic. It has been called the Riga Technical University since March 1990. On April 23, 1992, a student parliament was founded. It is the oldest student self-government in Latvia.

=== Riga Technical University (1958–present) ===
Riga Polytechnical Institute was re-established in 1958 by splitting off the engineering departments from the State University of Latvia. In 1990, it was renamed to Riga Technical University. The university currently consists of 9 faculties:

- Faculty of Architecture and Urban planning
- Faculty of Electronics and Telecommunications
  - Institute of Telecommunications
  - Institute of Microwave Engineering and Electronics
- Faculty of E-Learning Technologies and Humanities
- Faculty of Electrical and Environmental Engineering
  - Institute of Industrial Electronics and Electrical Engineering
  - Institute of Power Engineering
  - Institute of Energy Systems and Environment
- Faculty of Computer Science and Information Technology
  - Institute of Information Technology
  - Institute of Smart Computer Technologies
  - Institute of Applied Computer Systems
  - Institute of Applied Mathematics
- Faculty of Materials Science and Applied Chemistry
  - Institute of Polymer Materials
  - Institute of General Chemical Engineering
  - Institute of Technical Physics
  - Institute of Applied Chemistry
  - Institute of Technology of Organic Chemistry
  - Institute of Design Technologies
  - Institute of Materials and Surface Engineering
  - Institute of Particle Physics and Accelerator Technologies
- Faculty of Mechanical Engineering, Transport and Aeronautics
  - Institute of Aeronautics
  - Institute of Biomedical Engineering and Nanotechnologies
  - Institute of Transport
  - Institute of Mechanics and Mechanical Engineering
- Faculty of Engineering Economics and Management
- Faculty of Civil Engineering
  - Institute of Transport Infrastructure Engineering
  - Institute of Structural Engineering
  - Institute of Heat, Gas and Water Technology
  - Institute of Construction Technology
  - Institute of Materials and Structures
  - Water Systems and Biotechnology Institute
- Latvian Maritime Academy
- RTU Liepāja

As of 2020, it had 14,006 students. 3,525 out of these students were foreign students and 514 doctoral students.

== Riga Business School ==
The Riga Business School is a management–education institution within Riga Technical University. It was founded in 1991, in close cooperation with the State University of New York at Buffalo (USA) and the University of Ottawa (Canada), and it was the first higher education institution in the Baltic states that offered Master of Business Administration (MBA) programs in English.

The school currently has more than 800 MBA graduates, mostly middle- and upper-level managers both in Latvia and abroad. The education standards and structure are adopted from the North-American style MBA, which contains case studies, working in groups, and active participation in classrooms.

== Rankings ==
University rankings

Global – Overall
- QS World: 751–760 (2024)
- THE World: 1001–1200 (2024)

In March 2017, RTU announced that it had won the first place among universities in Latvia in the international U-Multirank rating. The employment of RTU graduates is rated the highest (at the A level). The same evaluation was given to the university for bachelor's programs in English, for self-created or spin-off companies, for the post-doctoral study process and creativity in science.

RTU is also the highest-rated Latvian higher education institution in the Times Higher Education 2020 Sustainability Assessment, which evaluates the performance of universities in sustainable development. place in the group of the highest rated universities. RTU was rated the highest in the category "Planet protection" – in 2020 RTU was recognized as the 14th best in the world in this field

RTU is also included in other European and world-class university rankings such as "QS World University Rating", "Eduniversal" and "GreenMetric".

== Notable faculty and alumni ==
Some of its most notable graduates are the Latvian-born Nobel Prize laureate Wilhelm Ostwald, the legendary Mayor of Riga George Armitstead, the former President of Latvia Andris Bērziņš, Prime Minister Valdis Dombrovskis and many others who have earned distinction in science and society.

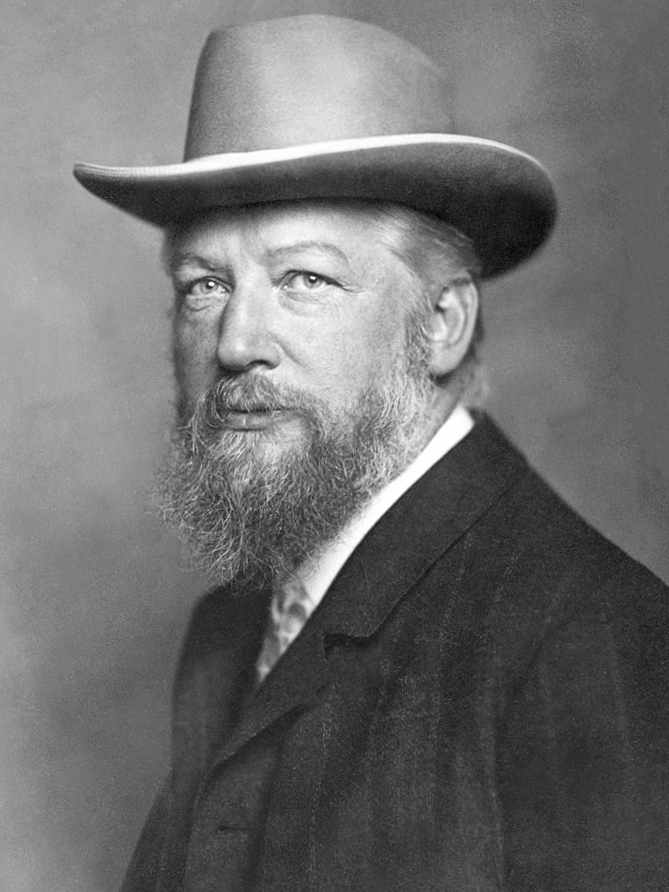
Wilhelm Ostwald, by Nicola Perscheid

- Wilhelm Ostwald – Nobel Prize in Chemistry, faculty 1881–1887
- Alfred Rosenberg – German politician, Nazi Minister of Occupied Eastern Territories, executed for war crimes, alumnus
- Paul Walden – chemist, invented ethylammonium nitrate as the first example of an ionic liquid, alumnus
- Friedrich Zander – rocketry and spaceflight pioneer, alumnus
- Ignacy Mościcki – president of Poland (1922–1939), alumnus
- Bruno Abakanowicz – Polish mathematical and electrical engineer, alumnus
- Władysław Anders – a general in the Polish army and a politician with the Polish government-in-exile
- Zbigņevs Stankevičs – Roman Catholic metropolitan archbishop of Riga (2010–), alumnus
- Moisei Ginzburg – Constructivist architect (1892–1946), alumnus.
- Vsevolod Mikhailovich Keldysh – Scientist, professor, general of the engineering and technical service, founder of the methodology for calculating building structures, father of Mstislav Keldysh, leading participant in construction of the Metro of Moscow, Moscow-Volga canal.
- Eduard Pantserzhanskiy – Soviet naval leader, alumnus.
- George Armitstead (Latvian: Georgs Armitsteds, 1847–1912) was an engineer, entrepreneur and the fourth Mayor of Riga. One of the most influential Rigans of his time, Mayor of Riga (1901–1912), graduate of Riga Polytechnicum (1869, with distinction).
- Lazar Markovich Lissitzky – artist and architect, alumnus.
- Mikhail Prishvin – Russian writer, alumnus.
- Vasiliy Ulrikh – Colonel General of Justice, Chairman of the Military Collegium of the Supreme Court of the USSR (1926–1948), alumnus.
- Mikhail Dolivo-Dobrovolsky (2 January 1862 [O.S. 21 December 1861]–1919) Engineer and inventor, creator of the three-phase alternating current power transmission system, RPI student (1878–1881).
- Ernst Enno – Estonian poet and writer, RPI student (1896–1904).
- Juhan Kukk – State Elder (head of government) of Estonia (1922–1923), RPI graduate 1904–1910.
- Zigfrīds Anna Meierovics – the first Minister of Foreign Affairs and the second Prime Minister of the Republic of Latvia, RPI graduate (1911)
- Hugo Celmiņš – Politician, social activist, agriculturist, twice held the office of Prime Minister of Latvia. RPI graduate (1903
- Andris Bērziņš – President of the Republic of Latvia, who won the presidential election held on 2 June 2011, RPI graduate (1971)
- Valdis Dombrovskis – Latvian politician who was Prime Minister of Latvia 2009–2014, RTU graduate (1995)

== Affiliations and alliances ==
The Riga Technical University is one of the eight holders of the European University of Technology, EUt+, with the Technical University of Sofia, Bulgaria, the Cyprus University of Technology, Cyprus, the Hochschule Darmstadt, University of Applied Sciences, Germany, the Technological University Dublin, Ireland, Polytechnic University of Cartagena, Spain, the University of Technology of Troyes, France, the University of Cassino and Southern Lazio, Italy, the Technological University Dublin, Ireland and the Technical University of Cluj-Napoca, Romania.

The European University of Technology, EUt+ is the result of the alliance of eight European partners.

== Gallery ==
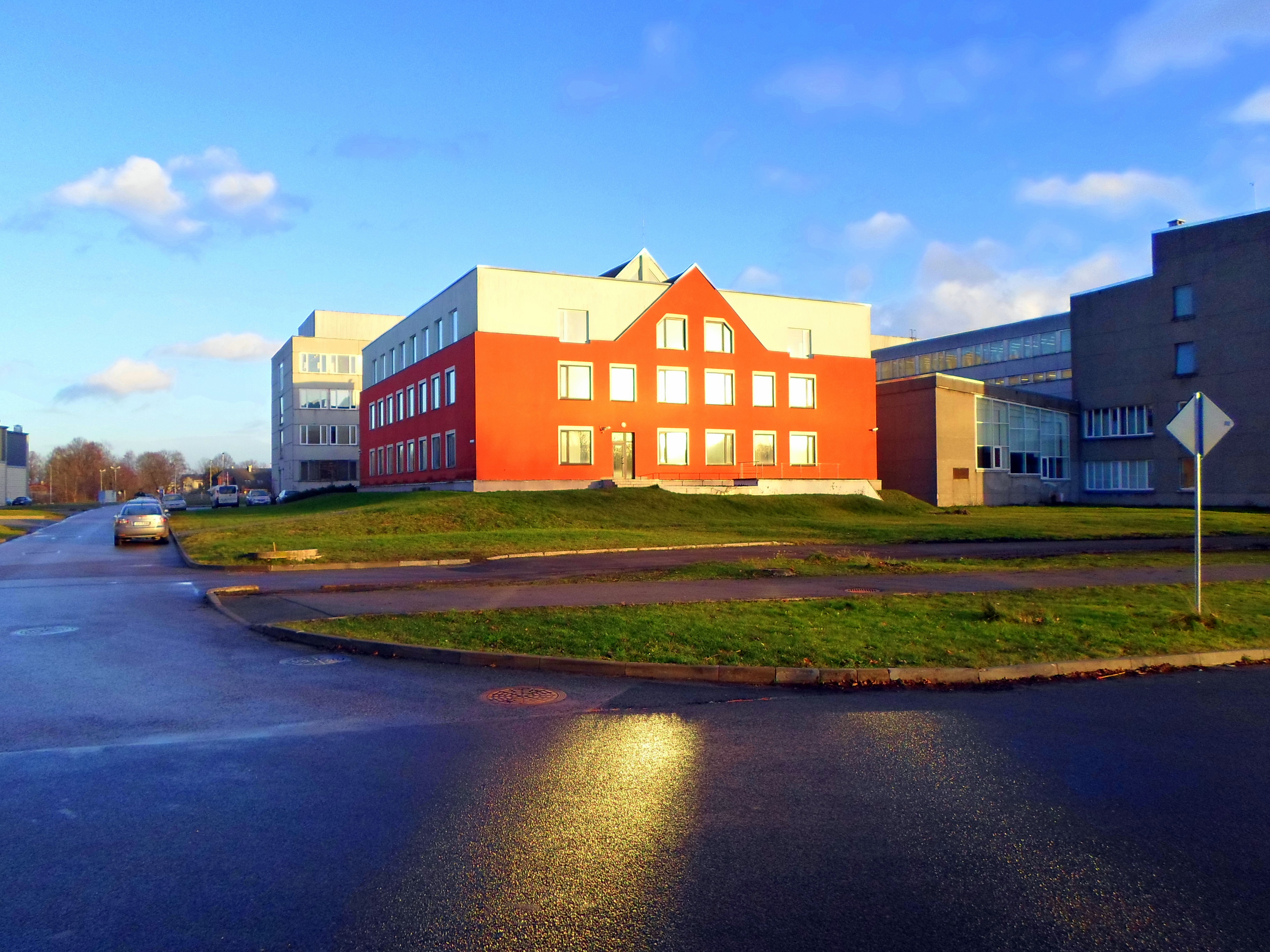
Scientific library (2013)

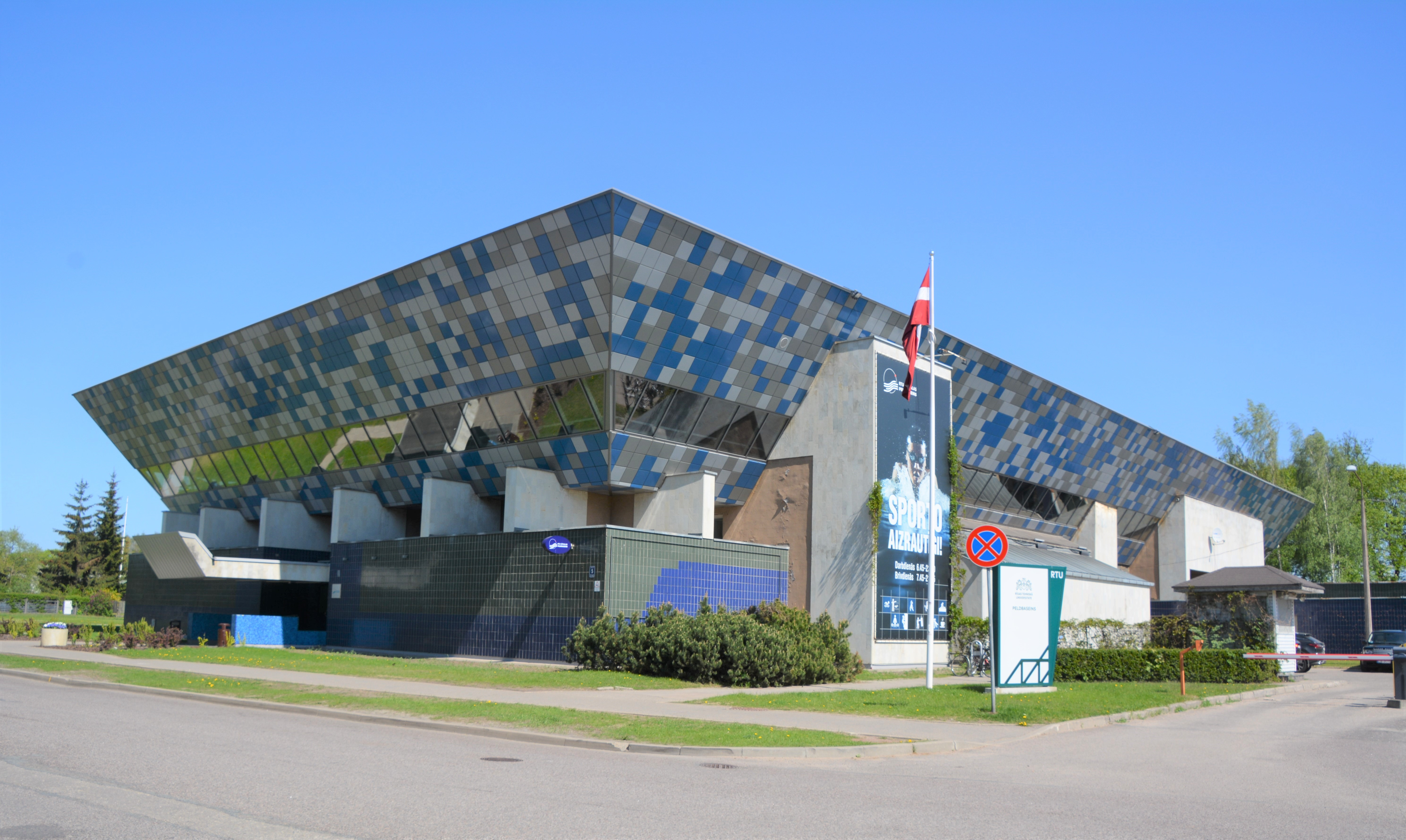
Aquatic centre on Ķīpsala.
