= University of Technology of Troyes =

University in Troyes, France

Coordinates: 48.269155°N 4.067087°E

- Université de Technologie de Troyes
- Other name: UTT
- Type: Public
- Established: 1994
- Affiliations: CPU, CGE, CDEFI, Groupe UT
- Endowment: 39,000,000 € (Overall budget)
- Chancellor: Christophe COLLET
- President: Hervé GRANDJEAN
- Academic staff: 168 (2023)
- Administrative staff: 240 (2023)
- Students: 3,106 (2023)
- Doctoral students: 187 Ph.D. students
- Location: Troyes, France
- Campus: 12 rue Marie Curie- CS 42060 10010 TROYES Cedex - FRANCE
- Mascot: The Duck
- Website: www.utt.fr

The University of Technology of Troyes (French: Université de Technologie de Troyes; UTT) is a French university in Troyes, France. The UTT is part of the network of the three universities of technology, founded by the University of Technology of Compiègne. Inspired by the American University of Pennsylvania in Philadelphia, these three universities (UTC, UTBM and UTT) are a French mixture between the universities of this country and its schools of engineers (Grandes Ecoles). UTT is ranked in the top 10 engineering schools 2017 in France by Usine Nouvelle.

They are indeed organised like the universities, temples of knowledge being based on the triptych teaching-research-valorisation (transmission of knowledge, the creation of knowledge and the transfer of knowledge in economic fabric). Their teaching model is a mix between the North-American model and the French traditions: courses choice, separation of the courses, work directed (TDs) and practical work (TPs). These three universities give thus an engineering degree equivalent to the Bac+5 formations of the French Grandes Écoles.

The UTT was founded in 1994 by Paul Gaillard and inaugurated by Jacques Chirac. One of its early chairmen was Thierry Breton (1997–2005), honorary Chairman of both Thomson and France Telecom, and former French Minister of Finance.

== Engineering majors ==
- Industrial Engineering (Génie Industriel or GI)
  - Production systems management (Sûreté de Fonctionnement et Environnement or GSP)
  - Supply Chain Management (Management de la Chaine Logistique or MCL)
  - Operational safety, Risks and Environment (Sûreté de Fonctionnement, Risques, Environnement or SFERE)
- Computing and Information systems (Informatique et Systèmes d’Information or ISI)
  - Electronic Transformation Support (Accompagnement de la Transition Numérique or ATN )
  - Software management (Innovation par le Projet Logiciel or IPL)
  - Data and Knowledge Management (Valorisation des données et des connaissances or VDC )
- Network and Telecommunications (Réseaux et Télécommunications or RT)
  - Networks and services convergence (Convergence services et réseaux or CSR)
  - Mobile technologies and embedded systems (Technologies Mobiles et Systèmes Embarqués or TMSE)
  - Systems security and communications (Sécurité des Systèmes et des Communications or SSC)
- Mechanical systems (Systèmes Mécaniques or SM)
  - Integrated mechanical design (Conception mécanique intégrée or CMI)
  - Production system design (Conception de systèmes de production or CSP)
  - Information technology in mechanical engineering (Technologie de l'information pour la mécanique or TIM)
  - Digital simulation in mechanical engineering (Simulation numérique en mécanique or SNM)
- Materials: Technology and Economics (Matériaux : technologies et économie or MTE)
  - Economics of Materials and the Environment (Economie des Matériaux et Environnement or EME)
  - Technology and Commerce of Materials and Components (Technologie et Commerce des Matériaux et des Composants or TCMC)
  - Transformation and quality of materials (Transformation et Qualité des Matériaux OR TQM)

== Post-Graduate programmes ==
=== Professional Masters ===
- Engineering and Sports Management
- Applied Civil Security and Safety
- Information Systems Security
- Environmental Management and Sustainability

=== Research Masters ===
- Optics and Nanotechnology
- Systems Optimisation and Security
- Networks, Knowledge and Organisations
- Mechanical Systems and Materials

=== Doctorate ===
- Optics and Nanotechnology
- Systems Optimisation and Security
- Networks, Knowledge and Organisations
- Mechanical Systems and Materials

== Research ==
1 laboratory structured with 3 departments and 8 teams all associated with CNRS

- ICD : Institute Charles Delaunay (The laboratory)
  - Department ROSAS
    - M2S : System Modelling and Dependability Team
    - LOSI : Industrial Systems Optimisation and Logistic
    - Gamma3 :
  - Department HETIC
    - Tech-CICO : Technology and Co-operation for Organisational Change and Innovation
    - CREIDD : Research Center on Sustainable Development
    - ERA :
  - Department P2MN
    - L2N : Light, Nanomaterials and Nanotechnology
    - LASMIS : Mechanical Systems and Concurrent Engineering Laboratory

== International relations ==
The UTT takes part in international exchange programs including ERASMUS and has signed agreements with many foreign universities (partner universities). The University of Technology of Troyes is a member of the European University Association (EUA).

The UTT is one of the nine members of the European University of Technology (EUt+), initiative, with the Technical University of Sofia (Bulgaria), the Cyprus University of Technology (Cyprus), the Darmstadt University of Applied Sciences (Germany), the Technological University Dublin (Ireland), the Riga Technical University (Latvia), the Technical University of Cluj-Napoca (Romania), the University of Cassino and Southern Lazio (Italy) and the Polytechnic University of Cartagena (Spain).

== See also ==
- List of public universities in France by academy
- Université de Technologie
- The University of Technology of Belfort-Montbéliard (Université de Technologie de Belfort-Montbéliard or UTBM)
- The University of Technology of Compiègne (Université de Technologie de Compiègne or UTC)
