= Technological University Dublin =

Technological university in Dublin, Ireland

Coordinates: 53.3546°N 6.2792°W

- Ollscoil Teicneolaíochta Bhaile Átha Cliath
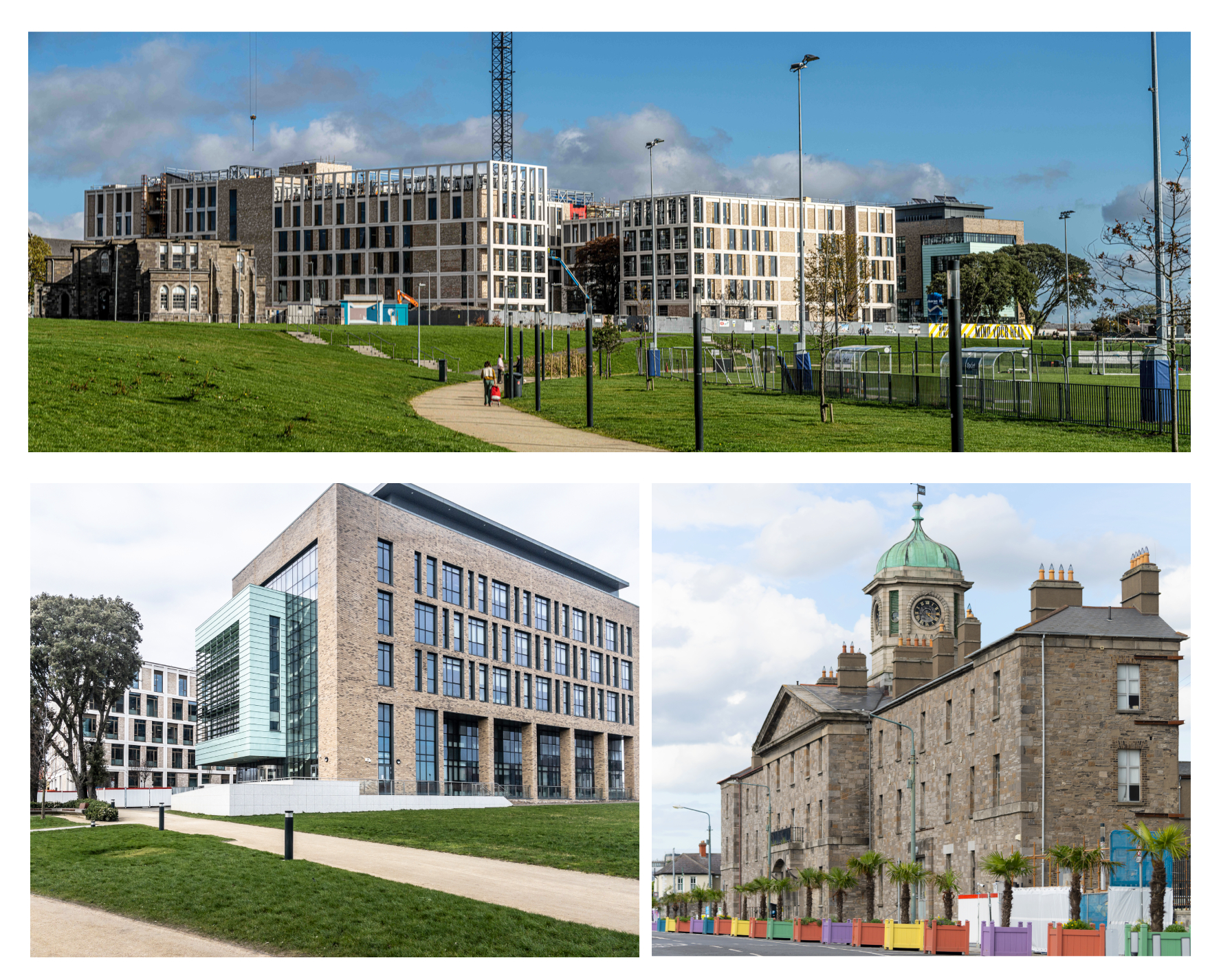
- The Grangegorman campus of TUD
- Other name: TU Dublin
- Former names: Dublin Institute of Technology; Institute of Technology, Blanchardstown; Institute of Technology, Tallaght
- Motto: Féidearthachtaí as Cuimse (Irish)
- Motto in English: Go Beyond Learning
- Type: Public technological university
- Established: 1 January 2019 – foundation of amalgamated university 1887 – foundation of City of Dublin Technical Schools
- Founder: Arnold Felix Graves
- Academic affiliations: IUA; EUA; UI; EUt+
- President: Deirdre Lillis
- Faculty: 3,500
- Students: 28,500
- Location: Grangegorman (Hub), Blanchardstown, Tallaght, Aungier Street, Bolton Street (all located in Dublin city and county), Ireland
- Campus: Urban; multiple campuses: Aungier Street, Blanchardstown, Bolton Street, Grangegorman, Tallaght
- Website: www.tudublin.ie

Technological University Dublin (Irish: Ollscoil Teicneolaíochta Bhaile Átha Cliath) or TU Dublin is Ireland's first technological university. It was established on 1 January 2019, with a history going back to 1887 through the amalgamated Dublin Institute of Technology which progressed from the first technical education institution in Ireland, the City of Dublin Technical Schools. It is the second-largest third-level institution in Ireland, with a student population of 28,500.

The university was formed by the amalgamation of three existing institutes of technology in the Dublin area – Dublin Institute of Technology, Institute of Technology, Blanchardstown, and Institute of Technology, Tallaght, taking over all functions and operations of these institutions. It is the eighth university in Ireland, and the fourth in County Dublin. The university asserts an entrepreneurial ethos and industry-focused approach, with extensive collaboration with industry for research and teaching. The flagship campus is in Grangegorman, Dublin, with two other long-term campuses, in Tallaght and Blanchardstown, and remaining legacy sites at Bolton Street and Aungier Street.

TU Dublin has approximately 2,700 full-time staff. Deirdre Lillis became President of the university in January 2025.

== History ==
=== Institutes of Technology ===
==== Dublin Institute of Technology ====
TU Dublin has its origins in the City of Dublin Technical Schools, with a Technical College founded at Kevin Street in 1887 by poet, songwriter and novelist Arnold Felix Graves. In 1978, with the formal amalgamation of the College of Technology, Kevin Street, and five other specialised colleges in Dublin under a federalised arrangement, the Dublin Institute of Technology was formed.

From 1976 to 1998, the Institute of Technology had a relationship with the University of Dublin, the degree-awarding body for Trinity College Dublin, for the sharing of facilities, equipment and staff, joint research seed funding, research partnerships, and for the University of Dublin to award Dublin Institute of Technology degrees under their own name in return for academic oversight; this partnership was credited for a 22 times increase in research output in the Institute of Technology in 1992 compared to 1975, and a significant increase in the institute's status. With the improved status, staff experience from the partnership, increased course demand, and success of Dublin Institute of Technology graduates in employment compared to university graduates, politicians and university academics sought greater autonomy for the institute, with Fine Gael higher-education spokesperson Theresa Ahearn saying "The colleges, in particular the DIT, at this stage rightly claim to have long experience of teaching to degree level ... I suggest that now is the time to give the colleges this power to award their own degrees". On 10 July 1992, Minister for Education Séamus Brennan stated that "The DIT will be given degree awarding powers", and these powers were ultimately granted in 1998 under the Dublin Institute of Technology Act, 1992.

==== Institute of Technology Tallaght ====
Institute of Technology Tallaght was established in 1992, at its dissolution offering courses through the School of Business & Humanities, the School of Engineering, and the School of Science & Computing.

==== Institute of Technology Blanchardstown ====
Institute of Technology Blanchardstown was established in 1999, and at its dissolution offered courses through the School of Business, the School of Humanities, and the School of Informatics and Engineering.

=== Amalgamation of Institutes of Technology ===
In 2014, the Dublin Institute of Technology (DIT), Institute of Technology, Blanchardstown (ITB) and Institute of Technology, Tallaght (ITT) jointly entered into a formal process to seek to merge into a university. At the time, following the Institutes of Technology Act 2006, there were fourteen IT's in Ireland, and a political appetite emerged to amalgamate several to form a more advanced third-level institution, known as a technological university, similar to that of Delft and other technological universities in Europe.

The Dublin bid, proposed by the three institutes, eventually coalesced into a move, in 2014, to seek designation as a technological university under the project title "Technological University for Dublin Alliance" / "TU4Dublin". A final application was submitted in April 2018, following the enactment of the Technological Universities Act 2018.

The formation of Technological University Dublin was approved in July 2018, and the university was formally established on 1 January 2019, on which date the preceding institutions were dissolved.

In April 2019, TU Dublin sold its Kevin Street campus to York Capital and Westridge Real Estate for €140 million. The Kevin Street campus was vacated in March 2021 and demolition works began on the site in April 2021.

In March 2020, TU Dublin put the Aungier Street campus up for sale, with the campus scheduled to close in 2023, after which students and staff will relocate to the Grangegorman Campus.

== Governance ==
The university is overseen by a governing body appointed under the Technological Universities Act, with representation for staff, undergraduate and postgraduate students, the local Education and Training Boards, along with the president of the university, an external chairperson and other external members appointed by the governing body and by the Minister. There is a regulatory requirement to have at least 40% female and 40% male membership and, by agreement with the Higher Education Authority, a suitable mix of skills and experience, considering business, law, human resources management, community organisation and others. Academic affairs, including course development and examinations, are overseen by TU Dublin's statutory academic council, as defined by the same legislative act.

== Academic profile ==
=== Admissions ===
Undergraduate admissions are made through the Central Applications Office, with applications opening in January and late applications closing early-May of the admission year; course offers are made to individuals who either meet the point and subject requirements of the relevant course, or alternatively have existing QQI qualifications for most courses, with some courses requiring the QQI qualification to be in a relevant discipline.

=== Faculty and Schools ===
TU Dublin consists of five faculties, their associated schools, and multiple research institutes and centres. Courses are primarily based in one of five locations.

TU Dublin is the only institution offering courses in optometry and ophthalmic dispensing in Ireland, with both a 4-year BSc in optometry and a 3-year BSc in Ophthalmic Dispensing running from the School of Physics & Clinical & Optometric Sciences within the College of Sciences & Health.

TU Dublin physics, optometry, and clinical measurement science degrees are fully accredited by the Institute of Physics, and National Framework of Qualifications Level 8 engineering degrees are fully accredited by the Institute of Engineers of Ireland.

==== Graduate Research School ====
The Graduate Research School offers the PhD programmes of the university, focusing research along the themes of:

- Environment, Energy & Health
- Information, Communications & Media Technologies
- New Materials & Devices
- Society, Culture & Enterprise

Graduate researchers are members of this school, in addition to being registered with their own school.

==== Faculty of Arts & Humanities ====
- TU Dublin School of Art and Design
- School of Culinary Arts & Food Technology
- School of Tourism and Hospitality Management
- School of Social Sciences, Law, and Education
- School of Media
- Conservatoire of Music & Drama

==== Faculty of Business ====
- Accounting & Finance
- Management
- Marketing
- Retail & Services Management
- Graduate Business School
- Promote & sales

==== Faculty of Computing, Digital & Data ====
- School of Computer Science
- School of Enterprise Computing and Digital Transformation
- School of Informatics and Cybersecurity
- School of Mathematics and Statistics
- Computing Learning Centre

==== Faculty of Engineering and Built Environment ====
- School of Architecture, Building and Environment
- School of Electrical and Electronic Engineering
- School of Mechanical Engineering
- School of Surveying and Construction Innovation
- School of Transport and Civil Engineering

==== Faculty of Sciences & Health ====
- School of Biological, Health and Sports Sciences
- School of Chemical & Pharmaceutical Sciences
- School of Computing
- Food Science & Environmental Health
- School of Mathematical Sciences
- School of Physics & Clinical & Optometric Sciences

=== Reputation and rankings ===
In 2021, Times Higher Education (THE) ranked TU Dublin 801-1000th in the World University Rankings, 201-300th in impact rankings, and 251-300th in the Young University Rankings. In the 2026 QS World University Rankings TU Dublin was listed 781-790.

University rankings

Global – Overall
- QS World: 781-790 (2026)

In 2020, U-Multirank listed TU Dublin as having the highest number of very good scores across various criteria compared to other higher-education institutions in Ireland.

TU Dublin holds an Athena SWAN Bronze Award for its commitment to advance gender equality in STEM.

=== European University of Technology ===
Technological University Dublin is one of the nine members of the European University of Technology (EUt+), a "transnational alliance" of European universities, which also includes the Technical University of Sofia (Bulgaria), the Cyprus University of Technology (Cyprus), the Darmstadt University of Applied Sciences (Germany), the University of Cassino and Southern Lazio (Italy), the Riga Technical University (Latvia), the Polytechnic University of Cartagena (Spain), the University of Technology of Troyes (France) and the Technical University of Cluj-Napoca (Romania).

== Facilities ==
=== Campuses ===
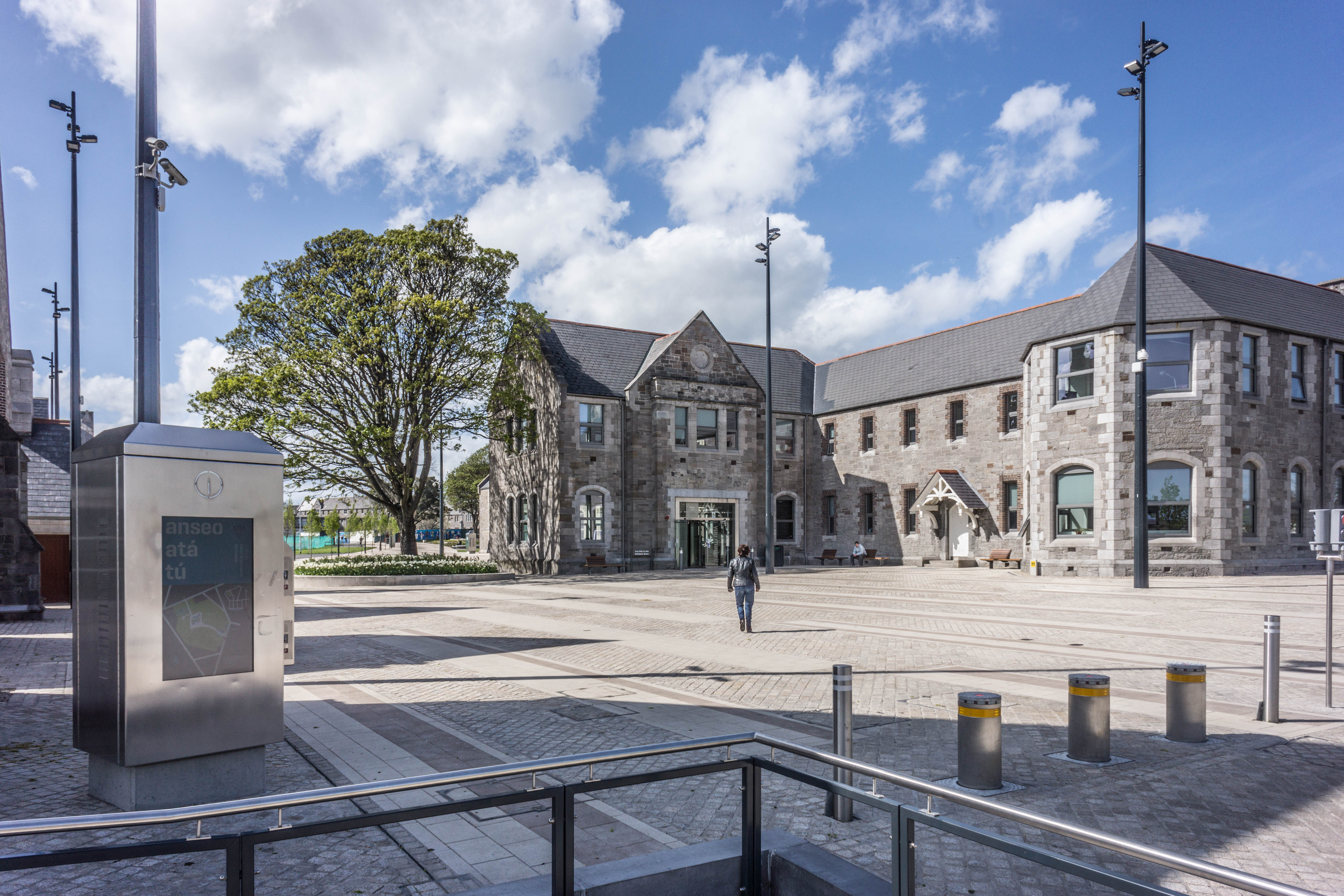
Grangegorman campus

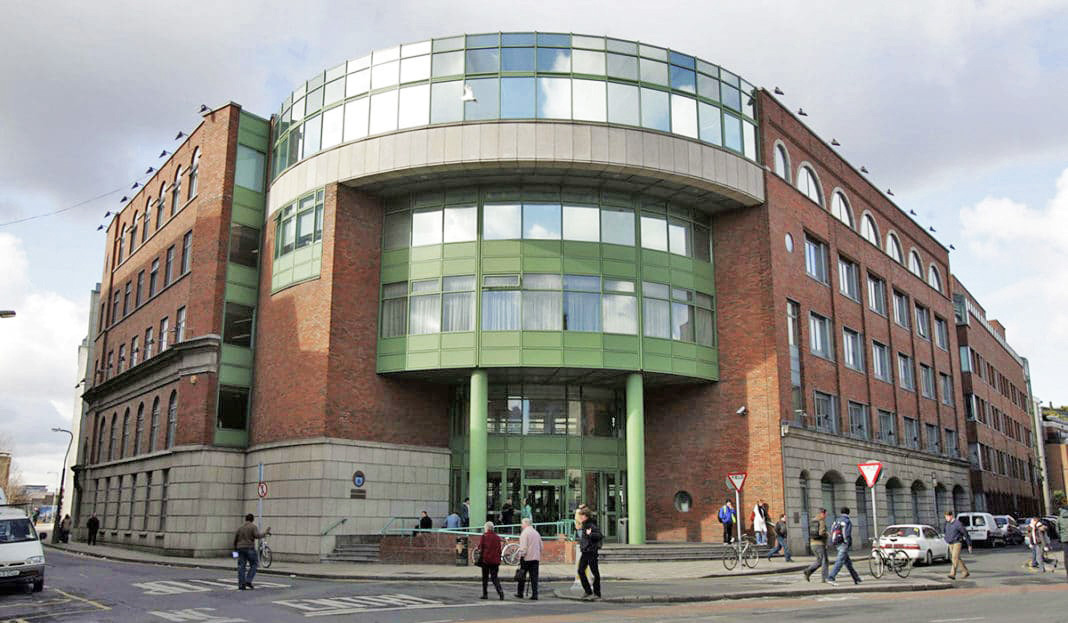
Aungier Street campus

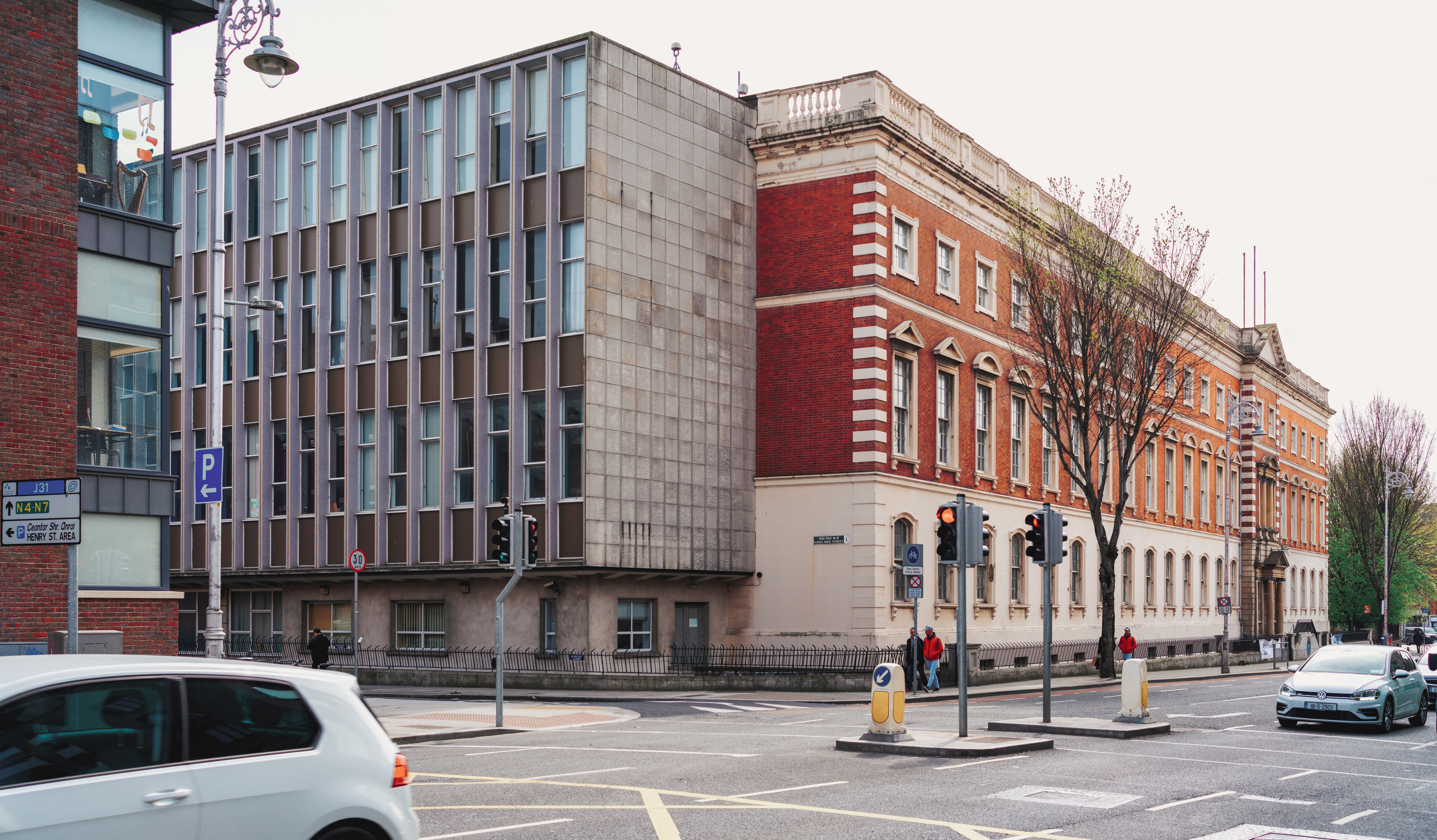
Bolton Street campus

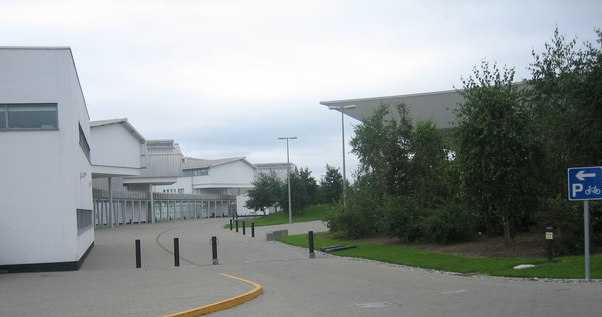
Blanchardstown campus

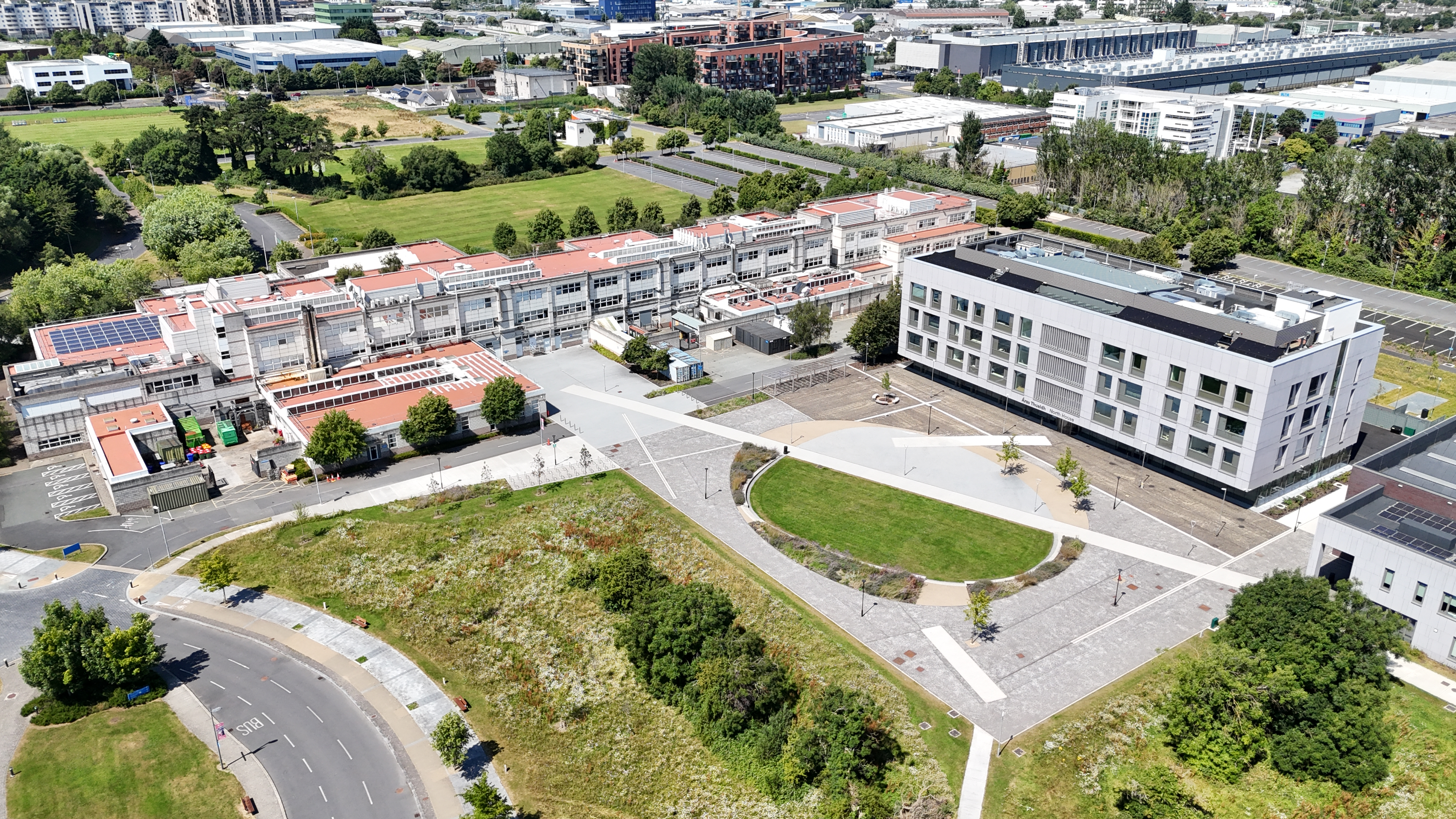
Tallaght campus

The university is based in five main campuses, with the Grangegorman, Aungier Street and Bolton Street campuses in Dublin City, and both the Blanchardstown and Tallaght campuses in the Dublin suburbs. The Grangegorman campus is now home to 10,000 students following the closure of Kevin Street, Cathal Brugha Street, Rathmines and Camden Row, while further development is planned for the Blanchardstown and Tallaght campuses.

According to then Taoiseach Leo Varadkar, the new university would have an "entrepreneurial ethos", and offer degrees and programmes ranging from Level 6 to Level 10 in the National Framework of Qualifications. While having an emphasis on computer science and STEM subjects, given its status as a technological university, the then Minister for Education and Skills Richard Bruton stated that the university would aim to sit at "convergence of the arts, business, science and technology".

=== Innovation ===
The Grangegorman campus includes the Greenway Hub, which is a "state-of-the-art facility for research and innovation that has been developed on the new TU Dublin campus at Grangegorman". It is home to the Environmental, Sustainability and Health Institute (ESHI) and to TU Dublin Hothouse.

TU Dublin Hothouse at the Greenway Hub has a 21,500 square foot start-up incubator, office spaces, conference rooms, and provides start-ups access to staff and researchers. Funding is offered to start-ups from the university itself, and from partnerships with Enterprise Ireland, Science Foundation Ireland, and Horizon 2020, among others. Assistance is provided with commercialisation, and protecting the intellectual property of start-ups in the incubator.

TU Dublin Hothouse runs a funded summer program, I-Cubed, for current students and recent graduates with business ideas who wish to start and run that business.

A market initiative Open Labs began in 2018 to assist start-ups and existing companies with research and development in specific technical areas, and as of February 2021 more than 150 start ups had participated in the initiative, generating over €1.5 million in research income.

== Student life ==
=== Students' Union ===
Technological University Dublin Students' Union (TU Dublin SU) was established by referendum in February 2019 as the amalgamation of DIT Students' Union, IT Tallaght Student Union and Institute of Technology Blanchardstown Student Union.

TU Dublin Students' Union began operating on 1 July 2019.

Annually, TU Dublin Students' Union oversees the election of class representatives, in which all students in the same course and year elect a student in the same group to represent them by conveying class feedback to the Students Union and lecturers. Class representatives attend the semesterly programme committee meetings of their own programme group alongside lecturers and professors, and attend semi-semesterly class representative meetings involving Students Union officers and other class representatives from the same school. Class representatives receive training from the National Student Engagement Programme.

=== Societies ===
Over 70 student-run societies exist throughout the five TU Dublin campuses, which receive a stipend from TU Dublin for activities based on membership of the society. Societies are formed by petition, requiring a total of 20 signatures from current TU Dublin students.

=== Sport ===
About 40 student-run clubs are present throughout the five campuses, for sports including various Gaelic games, association football, powerlifting, archery, rowing, skiing, basketball, kite surfing and cricket. A gym and exercise studio are run by TU Dublin Fitness, providing discounted access to TU Dublin students, staff and graduates, and access to the public.

The university also has a football club, TU Dublin F.C. that competes in the FAI National League, the third tier in the Republic of Ireland football league system.

== Other Technological Universities ==
In January 2021, IT Tralee merged with Cork IT to become Munster Technological University.

Approval for the Technological University of the Shannon: Midlands Midwest was granted in May 2021 and it formally opened in October 2021. It was the result of a merger between Athlone Institute of Technology and Limerick Institute of Technology along with some smaller institutions.

The South East Technological University was formally established in May 2022. It was the result of a merger between Waterford Institute of Technology and Institute of Technology, Carlow.

The Atlantic Technological University was formally established in April 2022.
