= Technical University of Cluj-Napoca =

Public university in Cluj-Napoca, Romania

- Universitatea Tehnică din Cluj-Napoca
- Former names: Cluj Institute of Mechanics (Institutul de Mecanică) (1948–1953); Polytechnic Institute of Cluj-Napoca (Institutul Politehnic din Cluj-Napoca) (1953–1992)
- Type: Public
- Established: August 1948; 77 years ago 1937 – Electromechanical College; 1920 – Industrial College
- Academic affiliations: EUA, AUDEM, BSUN, AUF, EUt+
- President: Prof. Nicolae Burnete, Dr. Eng.
- Rector: Prof. Vasile Țopa, Dr. Eng.
- Academic staff: 910
- Students: 19,478 (2026)
- Undergraduates: 15,442
- Postgraduates: 4,434
- Location: Cluj-Napoca, Romania; 46°46′N 23°35′E
- Campus: urban Cluj-Napoca, Baia Mare, Alba Iulia, Bistrița, Satu Mare, Zalău
- Colours: Red and black
- Mascot: beaver
- Website: www.utcluj.ro/en/

University rankings

Global – Overall
- QS World: 1201–1400 (2024)
- THE World: 1201–1500 (2024)
- USNWR Global: =1564 (2023)

Technical University of Cluj-Napoca (Universitatea Tehnică din Cluj-Napoca) is a public university located in Cluj-Napoca, Romania. It was founded in 1948, based on the older Industrial College (1920). The Technical University of Cluj-Napoca is classified by the Romanian Agency for Quality Assurance in Higher Education (Agenția Română de Asigurare a Calității în Învățământul Superior - ARACIS) as an Advanced Education and Research University. The university is a member of the Romanian Alliance of Science and Technology Universities (Alianța Română a Universităţilor de Știință și Tehnologie - ARUST).

== History ==
In 1948, under the provisions of the August 1948 law for the reform of education, the Cluj Institute of Mechanics was founded. The Institute had a faculty with two departments: Thermotechnics and Machines. The increasing need of technical specialists helped the Mechanics Institute turn into the Polytechnic Institute of Cluj, in 1953.

In 1992 the Polytechnic Institute was renamed as Technical University of Cluj-Napoca. In 2012, by a university agreement, UTCN absorbed the North University of Baia Mare, which became Baia Mare University North Center of Technical University of Cluj-Napoca

== Faculties ==
The university has twelve faculties:

- Faculty of Architecture and Urban Planning
- Faculty of Automation and Computer Science
- Faculty of Automotive, Mechatronics and Mechanical Engineering
- Faculty of Civil Engineering
- Faculty of Electronics, Telecommunications and Information Technology
- Faculty of Materials and Environmental Engineering
- Faculty of Building Services Engineering
- Faculty of Electrical Engineering
- Faculty of Industrial Engineering, Robotics and Production Management
- Faculty of Engineering (Baia Mare University North Center)
- Faculty of Letters (Baia Mare University North Center)
- Faculty of Science (Baia Mare University North Center)

University extensions in:

- Alba Iulia
- Bistrița
- Satu Mare
- Zalău

== Administration ==
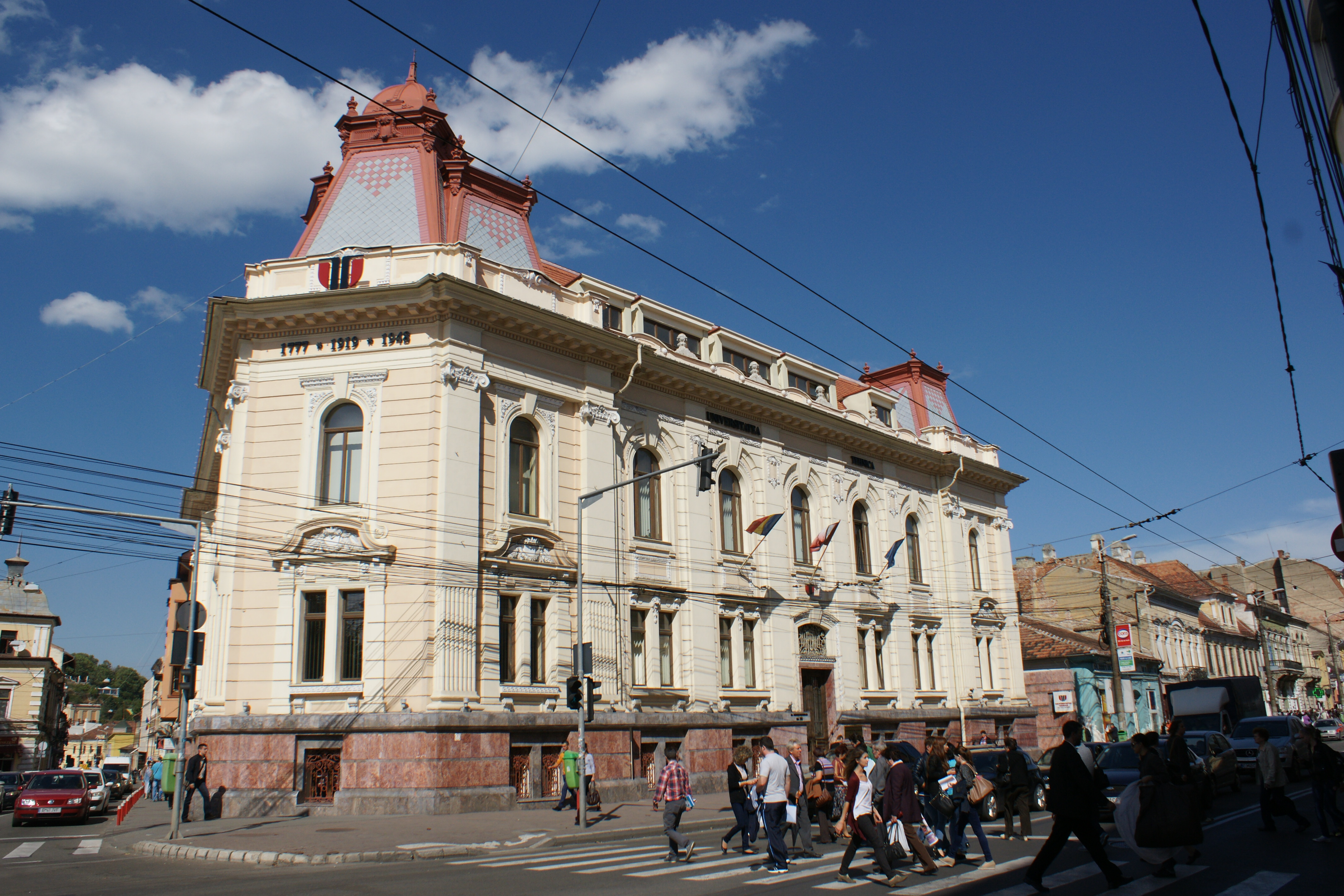
The Rectorate of Technical University of Cluj-Napoca

Like all universities in Romania, the Technical University of Cluj-Napoca is headed by a Rectorate (executive) and an elected Senate (Romanian: Senat), representing the academic staff and the students. The Senate elects its Standing Bureau (Romanian: Birou Senat), consisting of the President of Senate, 3 Vicepresidents, 1 Chancellor and 1 student.. The Senate has 108 members, including the Standing Bureau. The Senate also elects the Academic Council (Romanian: Consiliul Academic). The actual President of the Senate is Prof. Nicolae Burnete, Dr. Eng. The actual Rector is Prof. Vasile Țopa, Dr. Eng., who is heading the Executive Board including 7 vicerectors and a general administrative director.

== Facilities ==
Technical University of Cluj-Napoca is the second largest university in the city of Cluj-Napoca. The university buildings are spread across the city. The university has two student housing areas:

- Complexul Studențesc Observator
- Complexul Studențesc Mărăști

== Student organisations ==
In Technical University of Cluj-Napoca there are multiple student organizations: OSSIM (Organizatia Studentilor de la Stiinta si Ingineria Materialelor si Mediului ), the OSUT (Organizația Studenților din Universitatea Tehnică), ASCUT (Asociația Studenților Constructori din Universitatea Tehnică), BEST (Board of European Students of Technology) and a couple smaller ones, Green Club, LSPV.

== International relations ==
Technical University of Cluj-Napoca is one of eight holders of the European University of Technology - EUt+, together with Technical University, Sofia (Bulgaria), Cyprus University of Technology (Cyprus), Darmstadt University of Applied Sciences (Germany), Technological University Dublin (Ireland), Riga Technical University (Latvia), Polytechnic University of Cartagena (Spain), University of Cassino and Southern Lazio (Italy) and University of Technology of Troyes (France). European University of Technology - EUt+ is the result of the alliance of nine european universities partners.
