= Institute of Technology, Tallaght =

Third-level college in Ireland (1992–2019)

Coordinates: 53.290523°N 6.363564°W

Institute of Technology Tallaght
- Institiúid Teicneolaíochta, Tamhlacht
- Type: Institute of Technology
- Active: 1992–2019
- President: Thomas Stone
- Administrative staff: 400
- Students: 3,700 (2,600 full time)
- Location: Institute of Technology, Tallaght; Blessington Road; Dublin 24; D24 FKT9; Ireland
- Campus: 45 acres (180,000 m^{2})
- Website: http://www.it-tallaght.ie/

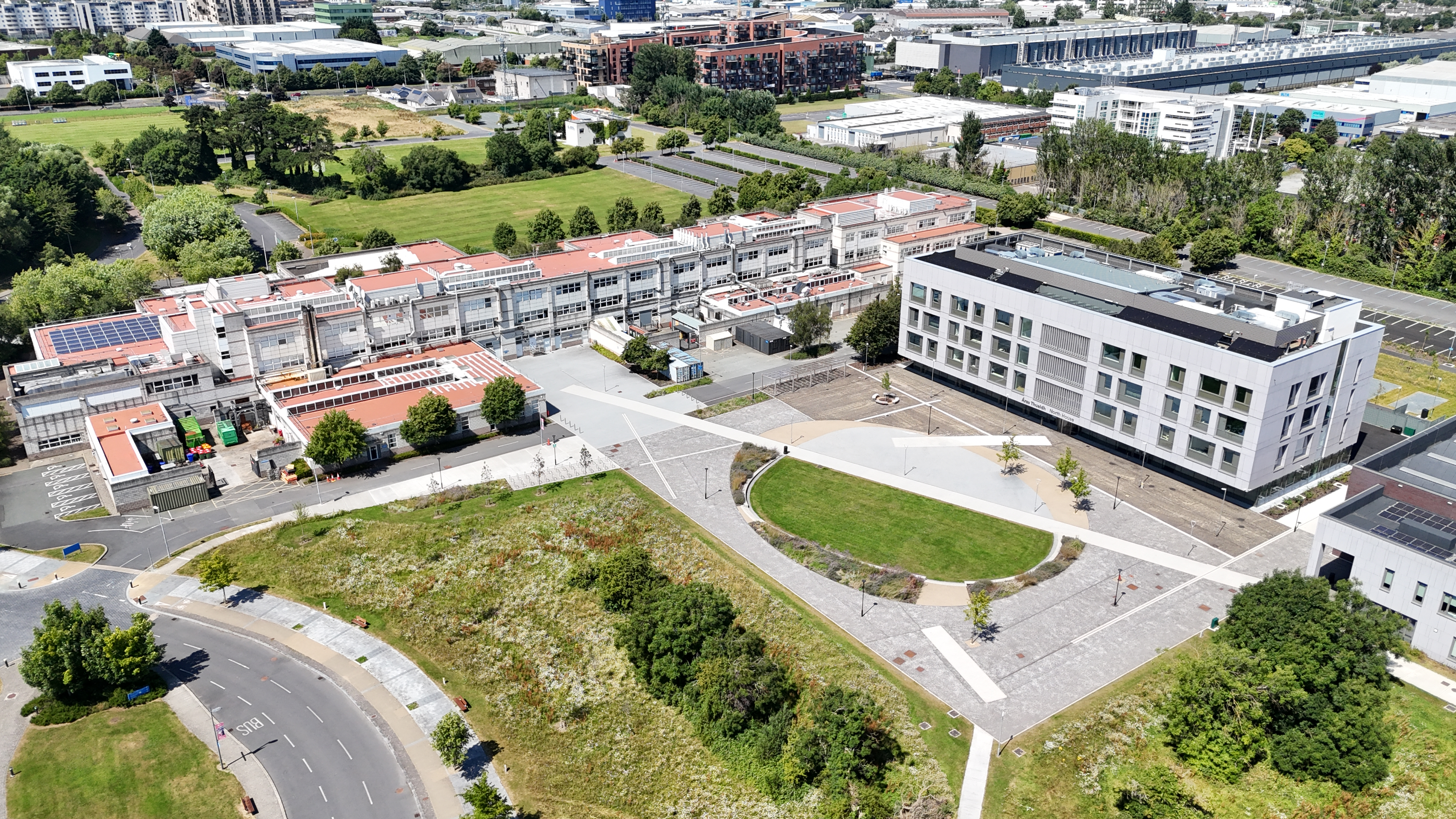
Campus of IT Tallaght

The Institute of Technology Tallaght (also known as ITT or IT Tallaght) (Irish: Institiúid Teicneolaíochta, Tamhlacht) was a third-level institution in Tallaght, the largest suburb of Dublin, Ireland. Established in 1992, IT Tallaght offered degree and postgraduate courses as well as adult education courses. On 1 January 2019 it was dissolved and its operations merged into the new Technological University Dublin (TUD). Its campus is now the Tallaght Campus of TUD.

== History ==
The institute was established as Tallaght Regional Technical College, in 1992, and was at the time the final new Regional Technical College opened in Ireland. In the words of M.B. O'Hara, a local secondary school principal, interviewed in 1992 during the buildings construction:

The Regional Technical College will open in October. It's being built at the moment and everybody's looking forward to it because we have a large young population in Tallaght. Now, it will be great for them to have an RTC on their doorstep, but I hope that it will help motivate the people in the middle who have a lot of ability but so far it's quite difficult to rouse their ambition, so I hope when they see third level life in the area that they may feel it's worthwhile putting that little bit of extra study in.

Tallaght Regional Technical College was built on lands donated for educational use to the Irish government by the Dominican Orders, St. Mary's Priory lands, in Tallaght. Qualifications were accredited by the NCEA (the forerunner to HETAC).

The institute adopted the abbreviated title of "ITT Dublin" in 2005, to differentiate it from IT Tralee; this did not change the legal name which continued to be "Institute of Technology, Tallaght" as stated in the Institutes of Technology Act, 2006. In 2016, the institute re-branded as ITT.

From 2011, IT Tallaght validated Theology degrees from The Priory Institute, located adjacent to the campus in Tallaght.

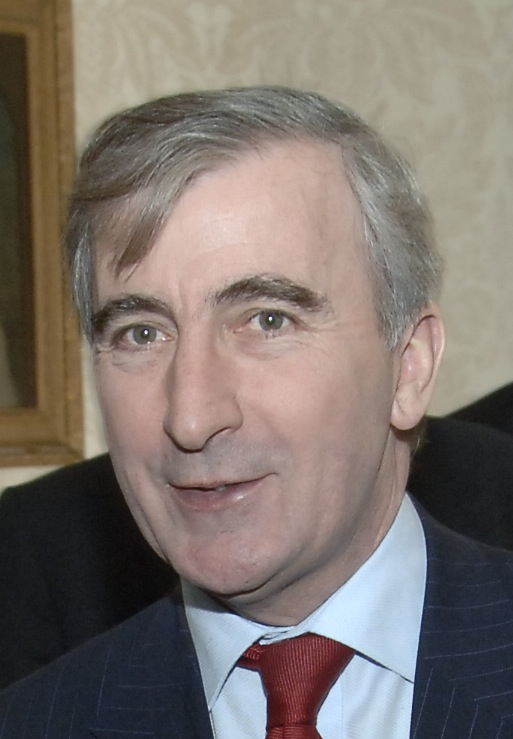
Former TD, MEP, Lord Mayor and Minister Gay Mitchell, graduate of the Institute of Technology Tallaght

In 2013, it was announced that IT Tallaght, IT Blanchardstown and the Dublin Institute of Technology intended to apply for Technical University Status. On 1 January 2019, this Technical University was founded under the name of 'Technological University Dublin', amalgamating all three institutions.

== Faculties and courses ==
The institute offered a variety of courses, including Higher Certificates and Bachelor's Degrees as well as postgraduate courses in the schools of accountancy, business, computing, engineering, humanities and science.

== Student life ==
IT Tallaght had many clubs and societies for students, including Drama, Radio, Soccer, Martial Arts, Computing and Snow Sports.

The institute also had a Radio Society broadcasting as "ITTFM" on 99.1FM. It broadcast twice annually, in February in line with the institute's RAG (Raising And Giving) week, and also in September for Freshers Week. When not broadcasting on FM, it streamed online through its website, www.ittfm.ie.

IT Tallaght was in the process of redeveloping land donated by the Dominicans of St Mary's Priory (with whom ITT worked closely in providing theology courses at The Priory Institute), for use as sports pitches.

== Technical ==
The institute was the hub of the ITnet network.

== See also ==
- Education in the Republic of Ireland
- Third-level education in the Republic of Ireland
