= H2biz =

- Industry: Conglomerate
- Founded: 2008; 18 years ago
- Founder: Luigi De Falco
- Headquarters: Naples, Italy
- Owner: H2biz SRL
- Website: www.h2biz.eu

H2biz is a private conglomerate in Italy, with operates in the media sector, logistics, publishing, fashion, industry and services. It was created by Luigi De Falco.

The company is headquartered in Naples, with offices in Paris, New York City, Tangier, and Budva.

== Company information ==
H2biz was founded in November 2008 as a social business network. In 2010, H2biz turned into a hub to manage international transactions of its members.

In 2011, FashionBiz was created as a brand dedicated to fashion. In December 2011, H2biz founded Outsider News, a newspaper based in Geneva.

Between 2012 and 2013 H2biz launched MED and EurAmerica, two networks operating in the Mediterranean, BRICS and South America.

In 2013, H2biz signed a business joint venture with Cyprus.

In 2014, H2biz diversified into the fields of logistics and commodity trading, buying silos in the Mediterranean.

In early 2015, H2biz began the construction of a port in Montenegro.
