= ITnet =

ITnet (Institute of Technology Network) was a PoS based multi Mbit/s network created for the Institutes of Technology in Ireland. ITnet used 45 Mbit/s links to each of the institutions and an international link of 310 Mbit/s via HEAnet.

The system was proposed in 1991 between Regional Technical College, Cork and Regional Technical College, Carlow, as they were then called. In 1993 an agreement was reached to create RTCnet. The system was running by 1994 with its hub in University College Dublin and service management at Carlow. All Regional Technical Colleges were connected to the system.

In 1998 RTCnet became ITnet to reflect the change in status of the Regional Technical College system to Institutes of Technology. The hub of the system and service management moved to Institute of Technology, Tallaght where an international link was provided via HEAnet.

ITnet was incorporated into HEAnet during 2007 and 2008 and has now ceased to exist as an independent network for the IoTs. All internet services are now provided directly to the Institutes by HEAnet.

== See also ==
- Communications in Ireland
- List of higher education institutions in the Republic of Ireland
