= European University of Technology =

European university alliance

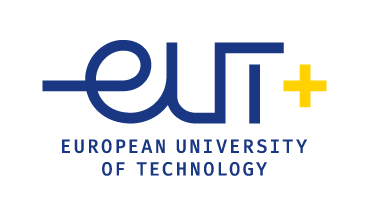
- Other names: EUt+
- Motto: European Values Empowering Technology
- Type: European University Alliance
- Established: 2020
- Academic staff: 7 000
- Administrative staff: 5 000
- Students: 100 000
- Location: Cartagena, Cassino, Cluj-Napoca, Darmstadt, Dublin, Limassol, Riga, Sofia, Troyes
- Website: www.univ-tech.eu

The European University of Technology (EUt+) was founded under the 2020 Erasmus+ call and is an alliance of nine European technological universities across nine countries, each with its own campuses, collectively educating 100,000 students. EUt+ aims to develop an integrated model of technological education and research that includes engineering, sciences, humanities, and social sciences disciplines, and to offer joint European degrees in engineering through self-customized multicampus curricula.

The first phase of EUt+ has already been implemented. In the second phase, EUt+ transitions from a project to an actual institutional process.

== European University Initiative ==
=== Context and origin ===
The European University Initiative, initiated by French President Emmanuel Macron in 2017 in his speech at Sorbonne University, aims to foster academic mobility and enhance the quality and competitiveness of European higher education and to deepen the feeling of European citizenship. It seeks to establish alliances among European higher education institutions to promote excellence in higher education, research, and innovation. It is primarily funded by the Erasmus+ program, alongside other EU funding sources and national or regional funding schemes.

=== Principles of European Universities Initiative ===
The European Universities Initiative aims to enhance international competitiveness of European higher education institutions (HEIs) and promote European values and identity.

=== European University Alliances ===
European University alliances aim to implement long-term joint strategies, with the goal of improving access to education, research, and innovation. A budget of €402.2 million allocated in the 2021-2027 Erasmus+ program, these alliances developing and implementing joint strategies to expand access to high-quality, inclusive education, research, and innovation. European University includes alliances from major capital cities to remote regions across 35 countries, engaging nearly 1,700 associated partners.

== Vision ==
The European University of Technology EUt+ aims to address global challenges, with technology playing a crucial role. They aim to be a benchmark for policymakers, guiding European strategy towards unified, evidence-based approaches to global issues.

== Member universities ==
- Cyprus University of Technology (Cyprus)
- Darmstadt University of Applied Sciences (Germany)
- Polytechnic University of Cartagena (Spain)
- Riga Technical University (Latvia)
- Technical University of Cluj-Napoca (Romania)
- Technical University of Sofia (Bulgaria)
- Technological University Dublin (Ireland)
- University of Cassino and Southern Lazio (Italy)
- University of Technology of Troyes (France)

== Progress ==
During its initial phase (2020–2023), EUt+ worked on a new model of technological education and developed the 12 features for its European Degree in Engineering.

In its second phase (2023–2027), EUt+ integrated a ninth member and is transitioning from a project management to a more institutional organisation.

Beyond 2027, EUt+ aims to deepen full integration, evolving progressively from a confederation into a single federative institution.

== Key research areas ==
EUt+ promotes research.

EUt+ creates the European Graduate Research School (EGRS) that will integrate existing structures in the member universities and facilitate, among others, the inclusion of postgraduate students in the Erasmus mobility scheme, training with and for the ERIs, development, and support of masters-by-research programs.

Also, the EUt+ Innovation and Technology Transfer Office, European Research Labs, and Innovation Hubs are their ways of creation.

== Satellite projects ==
EUt+ develops auxiliary projects to fulfill its mission.

=== Inno-EUt+ ===
One of this projects is Inno-EUt+, part of the EIT HEI Initiative aimed at enhancing entrepreneurial capacity within the European University of Technology.

EUt+ collaborates with over many companies and organizations, including Electrogroup S.A., Telefónica, Emerson SRL, the European Space Agency, GSI & FAIR, and AED-Vantage, enable internships, research visits, specialised lecture series for students and researchers and joint master's theses.
