= Alberto Gasparini =

Italian sociologist and professor

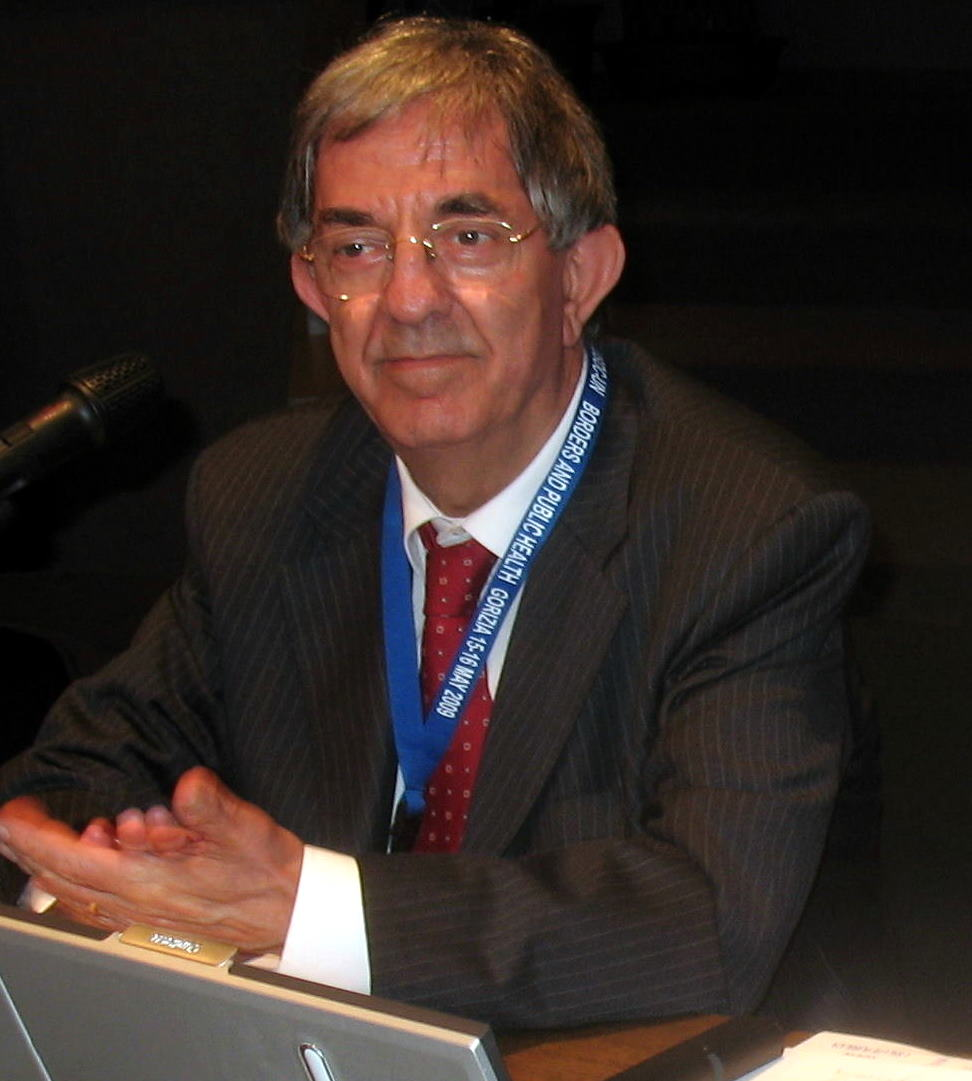
Alberto Gasparini

Alberto Gasparini (born January 13, 1940, in Modena, Italy) is an Italian professor of sociology. He is a founder and president of the International University Institute of the European Studies (IUIES) and director of the journals Futuribili (New Edition), ISIG Journal and IUIES Journal.

== Biography and career ==
Prior to his academic training, Gasparini researched and wrote a book on the history of the dispute between the Church and the Dukes of Ferrara between October 1597 and January 1598. Gasparini graduated in sociology from University of Trento (Italy) in 1969. He started working as junior and then senior researcher at the International Sociology Institute of Gorizia (ISIG) from 1970. He was lecturer and then associate professor in sociology of organizations at the University of Bologna from 1977 to 1987. In the 1983 was visiting scholar at University of Washington, Seattle. In the 1987 he became a full professor of urban and rural sociology at the University of Trieste. In this university he also taught sociology of international relations and techniques of forecasting. In 1989 he was appointed director of ISIG, and then director of the Department of Human Sciences at the University of Trieste. In 1992 he started up a research doctorate (PhD) in Sociology of territorial and international phenomena, of which he was coordinator.As director of ISIG he worked on relations with scholar from, and on the problems of, the countries which emerged from the collapse of the communist system after 1989.

He established relations with the Soviet Institute of Sociology and Academy of Science, the Universities of Moscow, Leningrad (subsequently St. Petersburg), Kharkiv and Tyumen. This led to a macro-research project on relations among ethnic groups in Europe, including three (Italians, Friulani and Slovenes) in Friuli-Venezia Giulia, three (Serbs, Hungarians and Slovaks) in the Yugoslav region of Vojvodina, four (Ukrainians, Russians, Jews and Belarusians) in the Ukrainian Kharkiv Oblast, and four (Russians, Ukrainians, Caucasians and Tatars) in the Siberian Tyumen Oblast.

While working at the University of Trieste and ISIG he resumed publication of the prediction journal Futuribili which deals with the prediction of social and political developments that have included the Yugoslav wars, Russia, the lives of futurologists, the concepts underpinning prediction, the future of religion and the Italy of the future.

In 2000 Gasparini proposed to nine European universities (Trieste, Udine, Nova Gorica, Klagenfurt, Comenius in Bratislava, Eotvos Lorand in Budapest, Babes-Bolyai in Cluj Napoca, Jagellonica in Kraków and the MGIMO in Moscow) and ISIG the idea of forming an international university consortium of European studies (IUIES) to design and organise a research doctorate (PhD) in “Transborder policies for daily life” and two Masters (MA) courses, one on “Communication and methods of European policy making” and the other on “International Peace Operators”. The students and teachers come from all over the world and carry out all academic activities in English.

From 2007 Alberto Gasparini has been appointed a full member of the Club of Rome.

== Selected publications ==
As well as academic publications, Gasparini has written, co-authored or edited 87 books. A selection is listed below, according to the main themes.

Housing and the community:

- Per ben abitare, Gorizia, ISIG 2001;
- La casa ideale, Venice, Marsilio, 1975;
- Influence of the dwelling on family life, Ekistics, 216, 1973;
- Community and territorial belonging, Comparative Sociology, 4, 2010;

City in relation to the symbolism of its spaces, organisations, social planning, technology and the future:

- La sociologia degli spazi, Rome, Carocci 2000;
- Sistemi urbani e futuro (ed.), Futuribili, 1–2, 2004;
- Riqualificazione e hinterland delle grandi città, Milan, Angeli 1993;
- Innovazione tecnologica e nuovo ordine urbano, Milan, Angeli 1991;
- Il futuro della città, Milan, Angeli, 1988;
- Crisi della città e sua reimmaginazione, Milan, Angeli 1982;

Rural modernisation:

- Ambiente operativo e azienda agricola, Milan, Angeli 1983;
- Contadino, una scelta, Turin, Paravia 1978.

Prediction and the role of new technologies:

- La previsione. Modi e temi italiani, Futuribili, 3, 2005;
- Prediction and future studies, Encyclopedia of Sociology, New York, McMillan, 2000;
- The future of the moment before. Scenarios for Russian society, torn between political, and institutional discontinuities and social continuities, Gorizia, ISIG, 1993;
- Gerusalemme e il suo futuro, con un prologo a Roma e a Gorizia, (ed.), Futuribili, 3, (2011).

Civil society, ethnicity, peace and borders:

- Società civile e relazioni internazionali, Bologna, Il Mulino, 2011;
- Cross-border co-operation in Europe: A comprehensive overview, Strasburg, Council of Europe, 2012;
- Globalisation, reconciliation and the conserving peace, Global Society, 1, 2008;
- Mobile borders between the Mediterranean and the continents around it, ISIG Journal, 3–4, 2009;
- Significati d’Europa, in The Europeans and the contribution are in place - when will Europe be?, Gorizia, ISIG, 2004;
- Nation, ethnicity, minority and border. Contributions to an international sociology (ed.), Gorizia, ISIG, 1998;
- Migrations between center and periphery (ed.), Iis, Annals, VI, 1997;
- Etnia? Sia se volete che sia (ed.), Futuribili, 1–2, 1997;
- Dialogue between cultures and changes in Europe and the world, IIS, Annals, V, 1996;
- Social actors and designing the civil society of Eastern Europe (ed. with V. Yadov), Greenwich, Conn., Jai Press 1995;
- Oltre le guerre balcaniche. Cosa può succedere quando i piccoli dei hanno grandi sogni (ed. with M. Radojkovic), Futuribili, 2, 1994.

== Honors and awards ==
Gasparini has received the following international honors and awards:

- 2013: Jubilee Medal "150th years of the Birth Anniversary of V.I. Vernadsky", Moscow;
- 2013: Doctor Honoris Causa in International Relations, by the Babes-Bolyai University of Cluj Napoca;
- 2012: Doctor and Professor Honoris Causa in Social Sciences, by the Eötvös Loránd University of Budapest;
- 2007: Expert in the field of trans-border cooperation of Council of Europe;
- 2006: Special expert of the Committee of the Regions of the European Union;
- 1999: Honorary member (no. 4) of the Futures Study Academy, Moscow.
