= Inside Concentration Camps =

Book by Maja Suderland

- First English edition
- Author: Maja Suderland
- Translator: Jessica Spengler
- Language: German
- Genre: Non-fiction
- Publisher: Polity Press
- Publication date: 2013

Inside Concentration Camps: Social Life at the Extremes is a book by Maja Suderland, a professor at Darmstadt University, which was published in 2013. It extends previous research by Paul Martin Neurbath and Zygmunt Bauman. It was translated from German into English by Jessica Spengler.
