= Darmstadt University =

Darmstadt University refers to:

- Darmstadt University of Technology (Technische Universität Darmstadt), founded in 1877
- Darmstadt University of Applied Sciences (Hochschule Darmstadt), founded in 1971
