= Ludmila Kuncheva =

Bulgarian-British computer scientist

Ludmila (Lucy) Ilieva Kuncheva is a Bulgarian-British computer scientist known for her research on pattern recognition and machine learning, and particularly on systems that combine results from multiple classifiers. She is professor in computer science at Bangor University in Wales.

== Education and career ==
Kuncheva is originally from Sofia, where her father was Head of Control Systems at the Technical University, Sofia. She earned a master's degree from the Technical University in 1983, and completed her Ph.D. in 1987 through the Bulgarian Academy of Sciences.

She joined the staff of Bangor University in 1997.

== Books ==
Kuncheva is the author of books including:

- Fuzzy Classifier Design (Studies in Fuzziness and Soft Computing 49, Springer, 2000)
- Combining Pattern Classifiers: Methods and Algorithms (Wiley, 2004; 2nd ed., 2014)

== Recognition ==
Kuncheva was named a Fellow of the International Association for Pattern Recognition in 2012, "for contributions to multiple classifier systems".
