= Technical University, Sofia =

Engineering school in Sofia, Bulgaria

Technical University of Sofia
- Технически университет - София
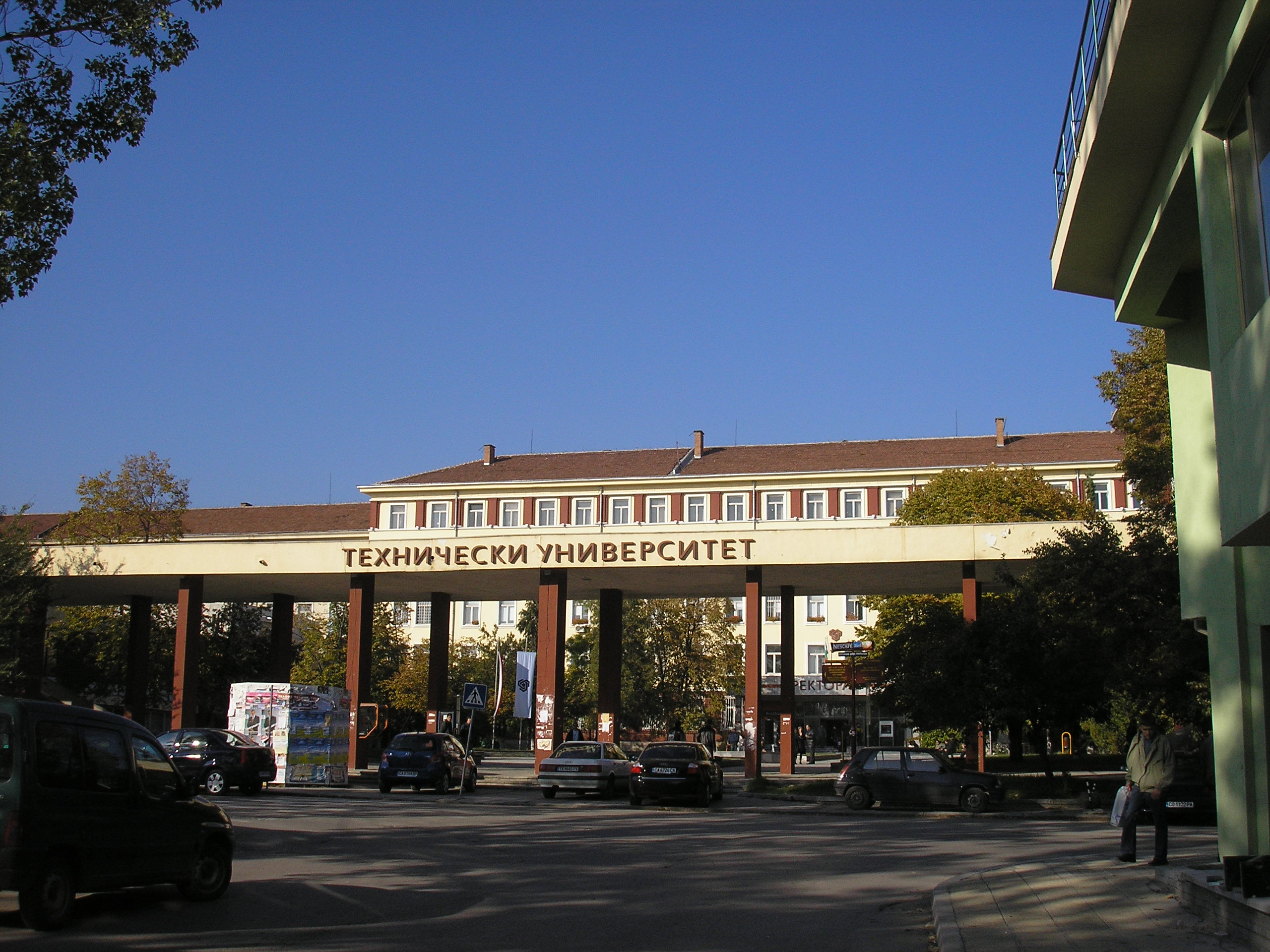
- The entrance and the main building (Rectorate)
- Type: Public
- Established: 15 October 1945
- Rector: Georgi Venkov
- Undergraduates: 8812 (academic 2023-2024)
- Postgraduates: 1912 (academic 2023-2024)
- Location: Sofia, Bulgaria; 42°39′26″N 23°21′20″E
- Website: www.tu-sofia.bg

The Technical University of Sofia (Bulgarian: Технически университет - София) is Bulgaria's largest and foremost academic establishment for higher engineering education. The university is a state-owned entity with academic self-governance.

Founded on 15 October 1945 as part of the Higher Technical School (later renamed to State Polytechnic), it has been an independent institution since 1953, when the Polytechnic was divided into four separate technical institutes. It has had its present name and university status since 21 July 1995 and has 14 main faculties based in Sofia, Plovdiv and Sliven, as well as 3 additional ones with education only in foreign languages — German, English and French.

== History ==
With Decree No 237, published in the State Gazette issue 248 from 24.10.1945, of the National Assembly of Bulgaria, a school called "State Polytechnic" is created with Mechanical engineering faculty with four divisions - mechanical engineering, electrical engineering and mining and geology.

In 1953, the State Polytechnic was split into four new higher institutes, one of which was the Institute of Mechanical and Electrical Engineering. It had two faculties - one of mechanical and one of electrical engineering.

Two years later, in 1955, the word "Higher" was added to the name.

In 1959, a faculty of Transport and Communications was formed which four years later (in 1963) was split into Faculty of Transport (existing until today) and Faculty of Radio Electronics.

The last was split into three in 1987 - Faculty of Electronic Engineering and Technology, Faculty of Telecommunications and Faculty of Computer Systems and Control all existing today. Some of the staff of the newly formed Faculty of Computer Systems and Control used to previously work in the Faculty of Automatics, which was separated from the faculty of Electrical Engineering in 1974.

The Faculty of Mechanical Engineering was only split once, in 1963, when two new faculties - of Machine Technology and of Power Engineering and Power Machines, were formed from it.

In 1991, the faculty of Management was formed.

Since 1991 the Higher Institute of Mechanical and Electrical Engineering was renamed to Technical University of Sofia.

The Technical University of Sofia is one of the nine holders of the European University of Technology, EUt+, with the Riga Technical University (Latvia), the Cyprus University of Technology (Cyprus), the Hochschule Darmstadt, University of Applied Sciences (Germany), the Technological University Dublin (Ireland), the Polytechnic University of Cartagena (Spain), the University of Technology of Troyes (France), the Technological University Dublin (Ireland), the University of Cassino and Southern Lazio (Italy) and the Technical University of Cluj-Napoca (Romania).

The European University of Technology, EUt+ is the result of the alliance of eight European partners.

== Campuses ==
The Technical University of Sofia consists of 5 campuses: Sofia, Plovdiv, Sliven, Botevgrad, Kazanlak.

The Central Campus in Sofia includes 14 buildings.

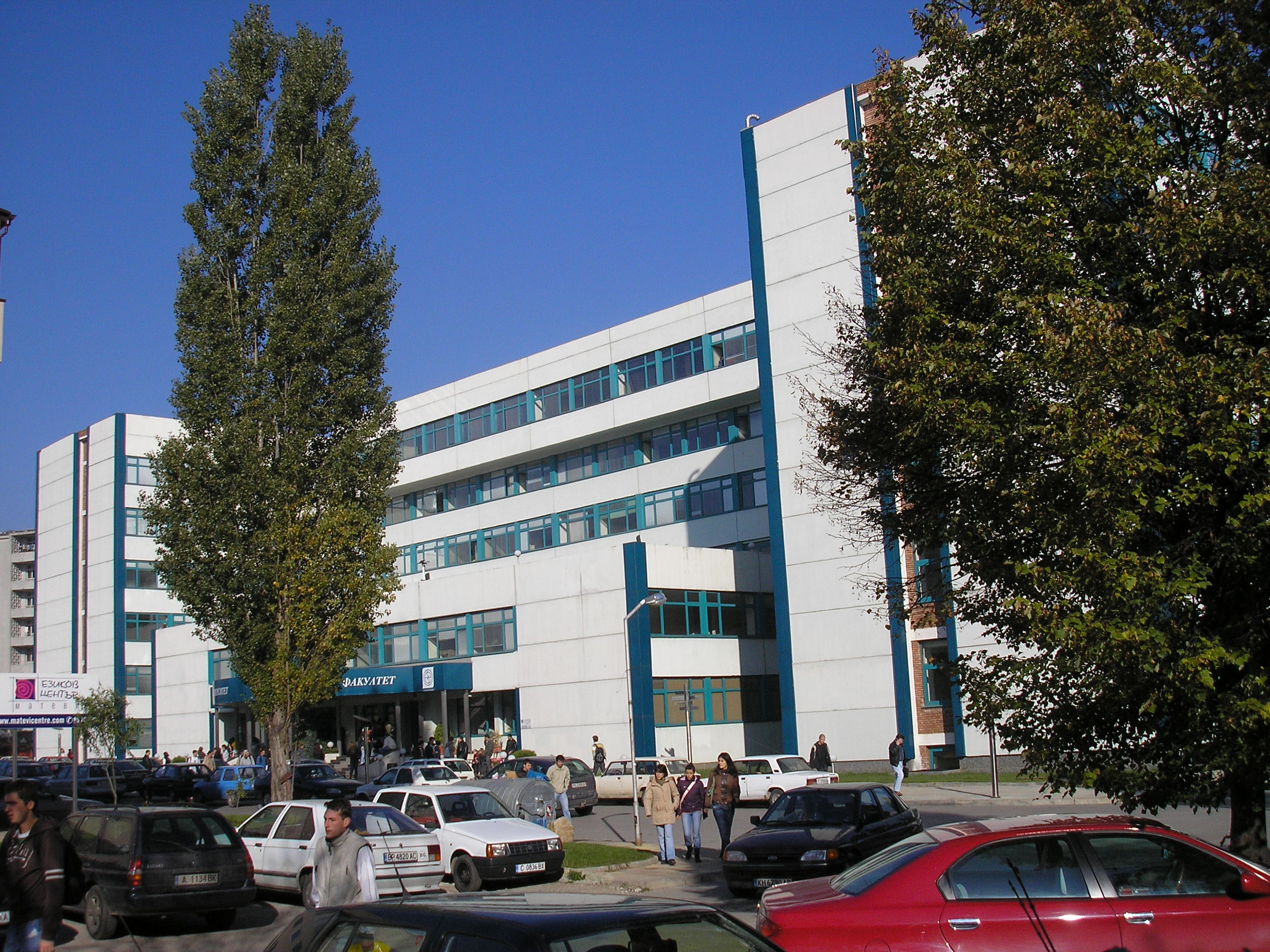
Faculty of Electrical Engineering

Building 1 used to be army barracks and now houses the administration of the university as well as the administration, the offices of scientists and most laboratories of:

- The Faculty of Electronics Engineering and Technology
- The Faculty of Telecommunications
- The Faculty of Computer Systems and Technologies

The University Publishing House, the University Information Resources Center are also situated there. The language center is a building dedicated only to foreign language learning. Also a separate building - Sports center houses an Olympic-size swimming pool and a number of other sports halls.

== Faculties ==
The Technical University of Sofia includes the following branches:

1. Faculties in Sofia (11):
  - Faculty of Automation
  - Faculty of Electronic Engineering and Technology
  - Faculty of Electrical Engineering
  - Faculty of Power Engineering and Power Machines
  - Faculty of Computer Systems and Technologies
  - Faculty of Communications and Communications Technologies
  - Faculty of Mechanical Engineering
  - Faculty of Industrial Technologies
  - Faculty of Management
  - Faculty of Transport
  - Faculty of Applied Mathematics and Informatics
  - Faculty of Applied Physics
2. Faculties in Plovdiv (2):
  - Faculty of Electronics and Automation
  - Faculty of Mechanical and Device Engineering
3. Faculty in Sliven:
  - Faculty of Engineering and Pedagogy
4. Faculties with education in foreign languages in Sofia (3):
  - Faculty of German Engineering Education and Industrial Management
  - English Language Department of Engineering
  - French Language Department of Electrical Engineering

Others

In its educational structure the Technical University of Sofia includes as well:

1. Colleges (higher schools):
  - United Technical College of Sofia
  - "John Atanasoff" Technical College of Plovdiv
  - College of Sliven
2. High schools
  - Technological School of Electronic Systems, Sofia
  - Professional secondary school of Computer Technologies and Systems, Pravets

== See also ==
- List of colleges and universities
- Sofia
