= Luigi De Falco =

Italian businessman

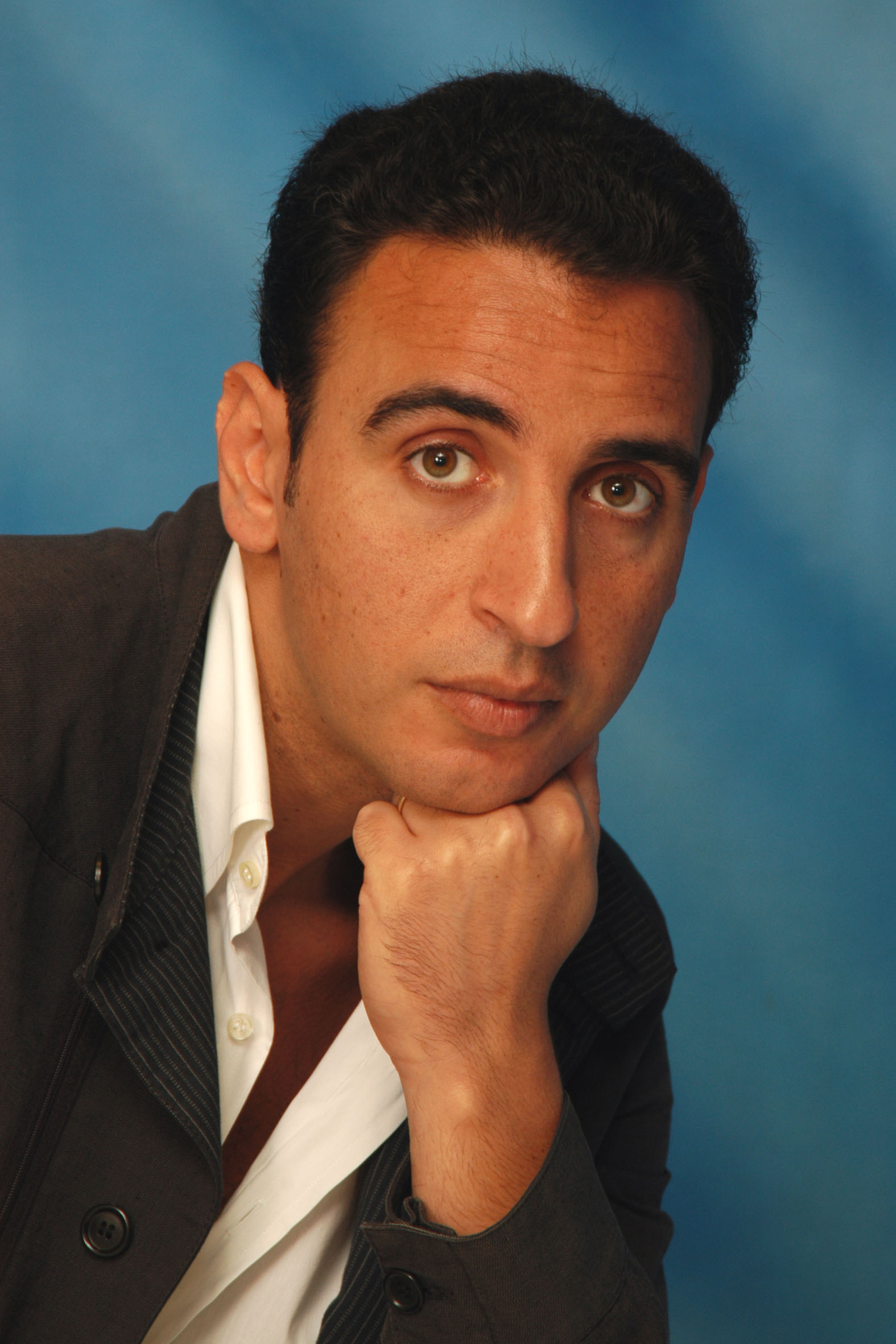
- Born: 4 May 1976 (age 50); Naples, Italy
- Education: University of Naples
- Occupations: Chairman, H2biz
- Spouse: Daniela Russo (until 2017)

Luigi De Falco (born 4 May 1976), better known as Cuore Matto, is an Italian businessman. He serves as the Chairman of the group H2biz.

== Biography ==
=== Early life ===
Luigi De Falco was born on 4 May 1976 in Naples. He worked at Milan Stock Exchange before founding his business group. He has interests in hi-tech, trading, fashion, automotive, motorsports and publishing.

=== Career ===
He started his career as a broker trainee at Rasbank.

His personal business career began in 2001 when founded e-Gav, the first Italian purchasing group.

Between 2004 and 2006, Luigi De Falco traded commodities with Argentina and lives between Naples and Buenos Aires.

From 2007 to 2011, Luigi De Falco managed MotorSponsor, a network for racing drivers, and competed in the Italian Mitsubishi Colt Cup

In early 2011, he launched FashionBiz, a brand dedicated to fashion.

In 2013, its group signed a business joint venture with Cyprus to buy logistics in Ivory Coast

In 2014, De Falco invested in commodity trading, buying silos in the Mediterranean.

In early 2015, with H2biz, he began the construction of a port in Montenegro.

In September 2015, he founded the Italia-Iran HUB.

In January 2016 Luigi De Falco founded an Italian sports car manufacturer, Giano Automobili.

In April 2016, its group signed two joint ventures with Venezuela's companies for optical fiber in Cuba.

In December 2016 the H2biz Group launches an international Big Data Platform for the pmi.

In June 2017, Luigi De Falco opens a new HUB in Thessaloniki to manage transactions with the new Silk Road.

In later 2017 the Giano Automobili Ribot has been tested for over 20,000 km on Italian roads.

In 2018 De Falco's Group launch a network for the BRI (Belt Road Initiative).

Today, Luigi De Falco controls H2biz, a conglomerate which deals in trading, media, fashion, publishing and manufacturing.

=== Motorsport ===
Luigi De Falco's racing team competes in the Italian Offshore Championship with the boat MotorSponsor C-33 "Freccia Gialla"

In 2013, H2biz sponsored the Honda LCR Team in MotoGp.
