= Arnold Felix Graves =

Irish poet, songwriter and novelist

Arnold Felix Graves (17 November 1847 – 24 May 1930), was an Irish poet, songwriter and novelist who played a leading role in developing technical education in Ireland.

== Life and work ==
He was born in Dublin, the son of The Rt. Rev Charles Graves, bishop of Limerick, by his wife Selina, the daughter of John Cheyne (1777–1836), the Physician-General to the Forces in Ireland. He was a brother of Alfred Perceval Graves and Ida Margaret Graves Poore. He was educated at Windermere College, Westmorland, and Trinity College Dublin. After successes with scholarships and sport in Trinity, he studied for the Irish bar from 1872 to 1879.

He was appointed Secretary to the Commissioners of Education for Endowed Schools in 1879 and was appointed Secretary to the Commissioners of Charitable Endowments and Bequests in Ireland in 1886. He worked to introduce technical education into Ireland and helped found the Royal Society for the Training and Employment of Women. In 1887 he was instrumental in the opening of Kevin Street Technical College, which became part of the Dublin Institute of Technology, and later the Technological University Dublin. He worked to ensure the success of this school and set up others. Ringsend Technical school opened in 1893 and technical schools were also set up in Galway and Limerick.

In 1893 Graves formed the Technical Education Association of Ireland, which pushed for the Agriculture and Technical Instruction (Ireland) Act 1899 (62 & 63 Vict. c. 50) to establish a system of schools under local authorities. By 1902 every local authority had adopted the act and this was the foundation on which the Vocation Education Act 1930 was established.

Graves' submissions for practical education to the Belmore Commission of 1898 were adopted by the National Board and this led to a new code, syllabus and regulations for National Schools in Ireland. He can truly be called "the father of technical Education in Ireland"

In 1877 he was one of the 10 founding members of the Fitzwilliam Lawn Tennis Club, one of the oldest tennis clubs in the world.

His novels included Prince Patrick (1898) and Clytæmnestra: A Tragedy (1903).

== Private life ==
Arnold Graves married Constance L Weatherley in London in 1881 and had four sons and one daughter. Two of his sons were killed during the Great War and his daughter died from the "Spanish Flu" epidemic that swept Europe after the War.

After the partition of Ireland, he moved to England and settled in London and Wheathampstead, where he died in 1930. He was buried in the churchyard at Wheathampstead but his gravestone was removed during a consolidation and tidy up of the churchyard in 1968.
