= Darmstadt University of Applied Sciences =

University of Applied Sciences in Darmstadt, Germany

Coordinates: 49°51′59″N 8°38′00″E

- Hochschule Darmstadt
- Other names: h_da
- Type: Public university, university of applied sciences
- Established: Technical Hochschule 1876, Hochschule 1971
- Affiliations: ATHENE, European University of Technology, IT cluster Rhine-Main-Neckar
- President: Arnd Steinmetz
- Administrative staff: 900
- Students: 17,000
- Location: Haardtring 100; D-64295, Darmstadt, Hesse, Germany
- Website: www.h-da.de

The Darmstadt University of Applied Sciences (German: Hochschule Darmstadt), also known as h_da, is a University of Applied Sciences located in Darmstadt, Germany.

h_da is part of the IT cluster Rhine-Main-Neckar, the "Silicon Valley of Germany" and ATHENE, the largest research institute for IT security in Europe.

== History ==
The roots of University of Applied Sciences Darmstadt go back to 1876 along with Technische Universität Darmstadt (The first electrical engineering chair and inventions fame), when both these Universities were a single, integrated entity from the early 1930s. Over the years a need for an independent educational institution focused on industry-oriented research was felt, and the University of Applied Sciences emerged as a spun-off, separate institution for industry-oriented research in 1971. It is the largest University of Applied Sciences in Hesse (German: Hessen) with about 11,000 students.

In 1971 when Hochschule Darmstadt was established, other regions of the Hesse also felt the need of such industry based educational institutions. In later years a large number of Hochschule were established all over Germany. As a result of this, today the German industry's engineering workforce is propelled by students of the Hochschule.

The Darmstadt University of Applied Sciences (German: Hochschule Darmstadt) is one of the nine holders of the European University of Technology, EUt+, with the Riga Technical University (Latvia), the Cyprus University of Technology (Cyprus), the Technical University of Sofia (Bulgaria), the Technological University Dublin (Ireland), the Polytechnic University of Cartagena (Spain), the University of Technology of Troyes (France), the University of Cassino and Southern Lazio (Italy), and the Technical University of Cluj-Napoca (Romania).

The European University of Technology alliance, EUt+, is the result of the cooperation of eight European partners who share in common the "Think Human First" vision towards a human-centred approach to technology and the ambition to establish a new type of institution on a confederal basis. Through EUt+, the partners are committed to creating a sustainable future for students and learners in European countries, for the staff of each of the institutions and for the territories and regions where each campus is anchored.

== Campus ==
The Main campus of the Hochschule Darmstadt lies at the Haardtring office, but, the campus is evenly distributed all across the city of Darmstadt at different locations. A cluster of Old and Modern university buildings are visible across the city of Darmstadt. The media campus is in Dieburg.

== Departments ==
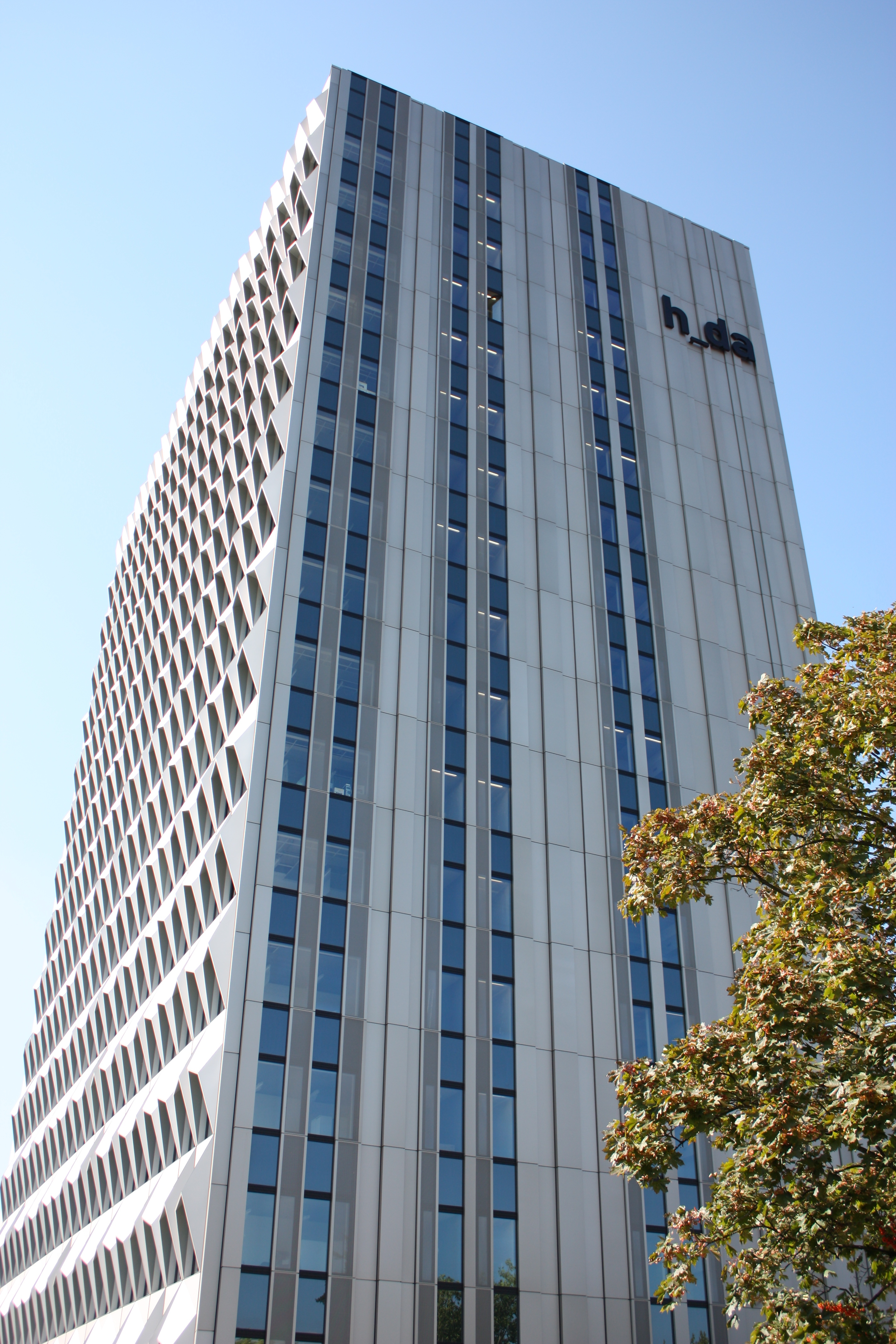
View of the 'Hochhaus' (high-rise), Administrative Building

- Architecture
- Chemical Technology
- Civil Engineering
- Computer Science
- Design
- Media
- Economics
- Electrical Engineering and Information Technology
- Mathematics and Science
- Mechanical Engineering
- Plastics engineering
- Social and Cultural Studies
- Social Education
- Mechatronics

== Reputation and Rankings ==
Hochschule Darmstadt is a well-reputed institute to businesses in the German industry. It has consistently ranked very high on the DAAD ranking closely rivaled by Hochschule Karlsruhe. Maintaining its reputation in the specializations of Microelectronics and Robotics, Hochschule Darmstadt has contributed to some major industrial developments in Germany, including REIS and Mitsubishi Robot modules.

== Research ==
Incorporated close ties with

- IIS Fraunhofer
- Max Planck Society
- EUA European University Association

== Institutes ==
- Institute of Communication and Media (ikum)
- Institute of Local Economics and Environmental Planning

== See also ==
- Education in Germany
- List of universities in Germany
