= Northern University, Romania =

University in Romania

Coordinates: 47°39′37″N 23°32′42″E

Technical University of Cluj-Napoca - North University Centre of Baia Mare
- Universitatea Tehnică din Cluj-Napoca - Centrul Universitar Nord din Baia Mare
- Former names: Higher Education Institute, Baia Mare University, North University
- Type: Public
- Established: 1974
- Rector: dr. ing. Vasile Țopa
- Students: 4,451 (2012-2013)
- Undergraduates: 3,423
- Postgraduates: 1,028
- Location: Baia Mare, Romania
- Website: www.utcluj.ro/

The Technical University of Cluj-Napoca - North University Centre of Baia Mare (Romanian: Universitatea Tehnică din Cluj-Napoca - Centrul Universitar Nord din Baia Mare) is the campus of Technical University of Cluj-Napoca, in Baia Mare, Romania.

== History ==
The school traces its origins to the North University (Romanian: Universitatea de Nord din Baia Mare (UNBM)), a former public university founded in 1974, under the name of Higher Education Institute (Romanian: Institutul de Invățămint Superior); in 1991, changed into Baia Mare University (Romanian: Universitatea Baia Mare), and from 1996, North University). In 2011, the UNBM Senate voted to affiliate with the Technical University of Cluj-Napoca. The fusion process ended with the 2012 academic elections.

Baia Mare has a strong doctoral school in the fields of philology, philosophy, mathematics, and engineering sciences.

The Doctoral School of Philosophy in Baia Mare was established in 2007 by Professor Emeritus Dr. Petru Dunca, together with Professor Dr. Ion Dur and Professor Dr. Teodor Vidam. It is one of the five active doctoral schools of philosophy in Romania.

== About ==
The Technical University of Cluj-Napoca, is an “Advanced Research and Education University” as awarded with the Order of the Ministry of National Education no 5262/September 5, 2011, is today a tertiary educational institution having both tradition and national and international recognition. The Technical University comprises at present 12 faculties, in the two academic centres of Cluj-Napoca and Baia Mare as well as in locations, such as Alba-Iulia, Bistrița, Satu-Mare and Zalău. The educational offer, aligning the Bologna system, includes Bachelor, Master, Ph.D. programmes of study as well as lifelong educational programmes. The domains of study range widely from engineering to architecture, from fundamental sciences to social sciences, humanities and arts. The Department of Lifelong Learning, Distance Learning, and part-time courses also organizes activities and lifelong courses, post graduate programmes, as well as courses for professional development and occupational standards.

== Faculties ==
The campus keeps the structure of the former university with three faculties:

- Faculty of Engineering;
- Faculty of Letters;
- Faculty of Science.
