= Hub (network science) =

Node with a number of links that greatly exceeds the average

In network science, a hub is a node with a number of links that greatly exceeds the average. Emergence of hubs is a consequence of a scale-free property of networks. While hubs cannot be observed in a random network, they are expected to emerge in scale-free networks. The uprise of hubs in scale-free networks is associated with power-law distribution. Hubs have a significant impact on the network topology. Hubs can be found in many real networks, such as the brain or the Internet.

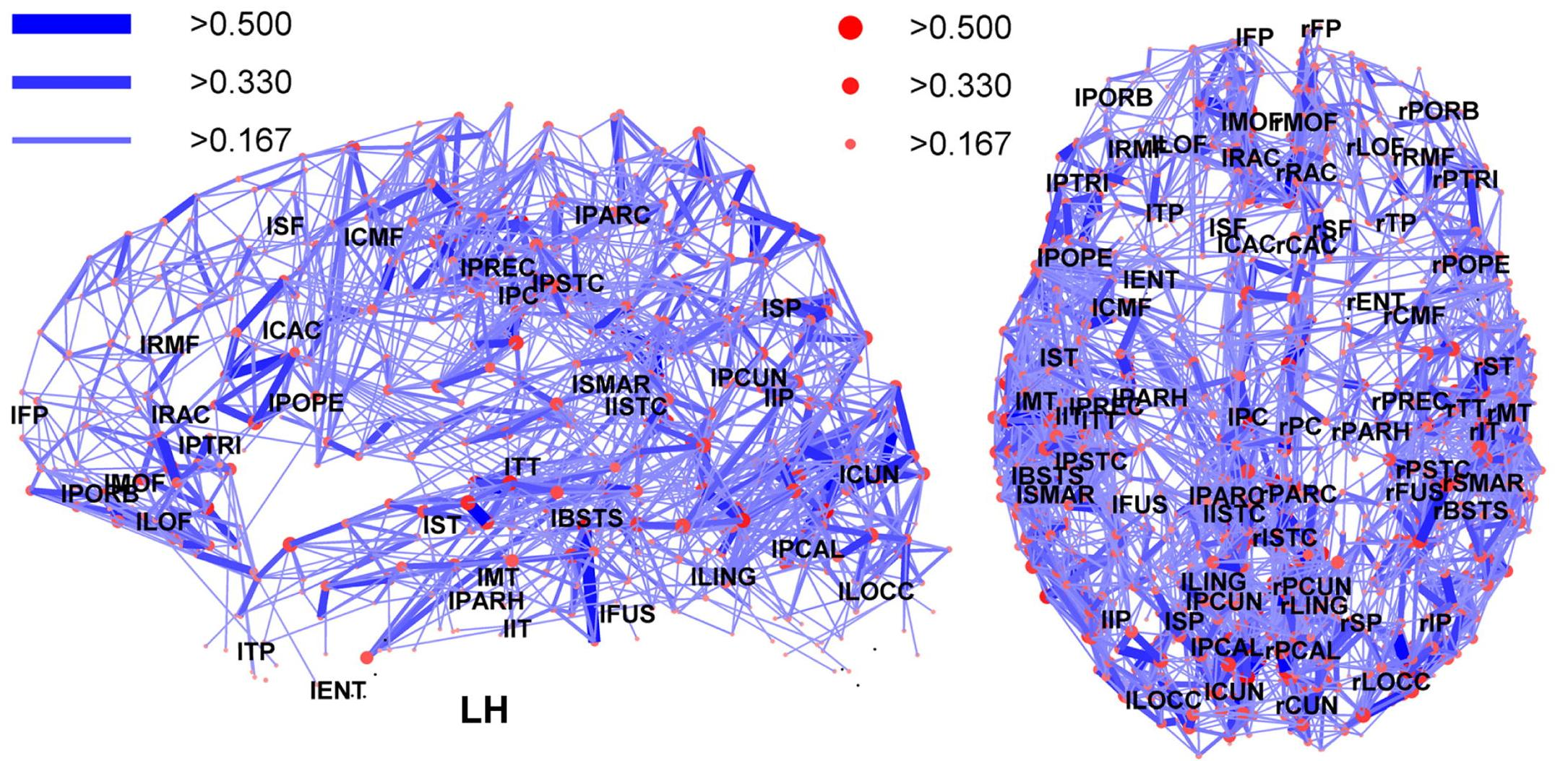
Network representation of brain connectivity. Hubs are highlighted

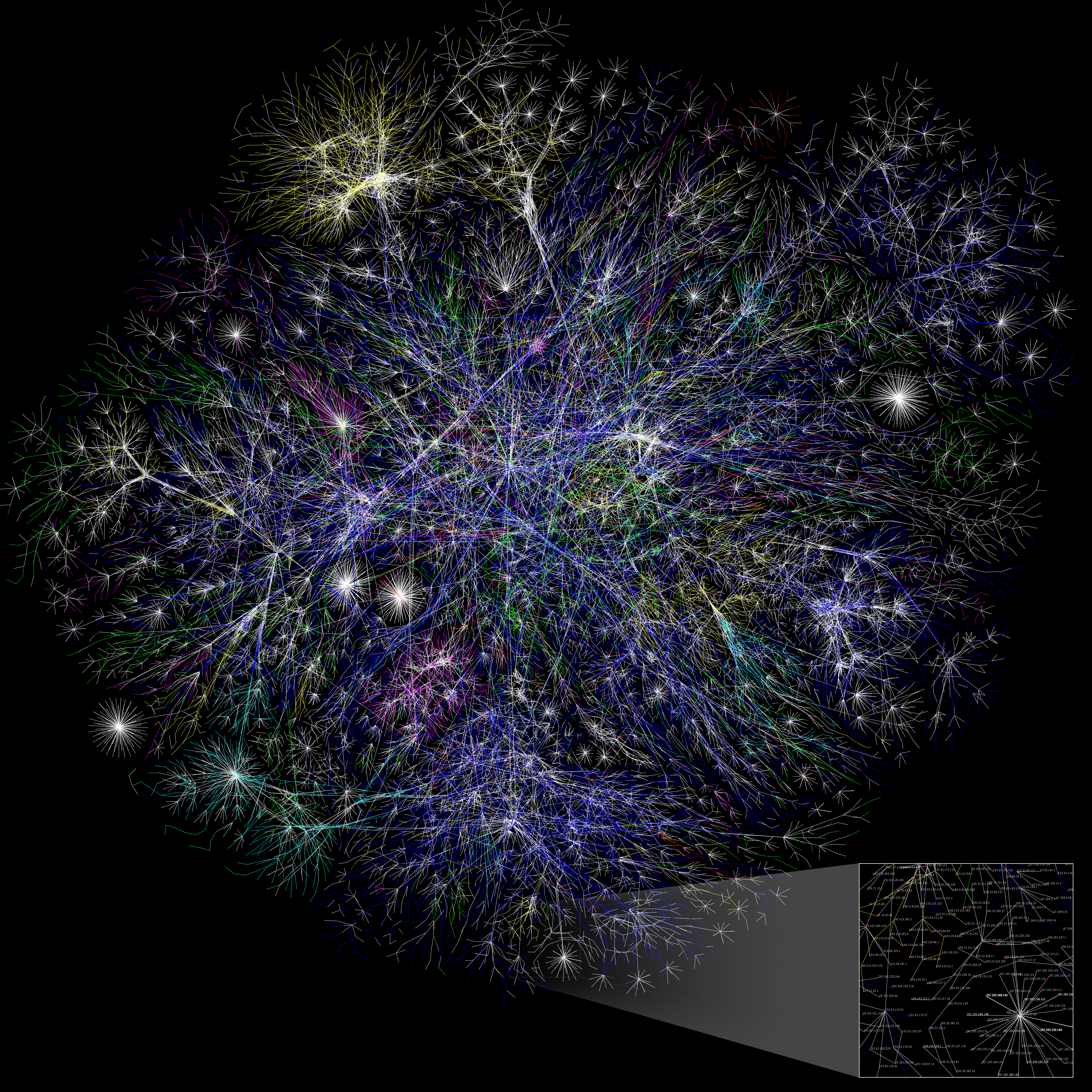
Partial map of the Internet based on the January 15, 2005. Hubs are highlighted

A hub is a component of a network with a high-degree node. Hubs have a significantly larger number of links in comparison with other nodes in the network. The number of links (degrees) for a hub in a scale-free network is much higher than for the biggest node in a random network, keeping the size N of the network and average degree <k> constant. The existence of hubs is the biggest difference between random networks and scale-free networks. In random networks, the degree k is comparable for every node; it is therefore not possible for hubs to emerge. In scale-free networks, a few nodes (hubs) have a high degree k while the other nodes have a small number of links.

== Emergence ==
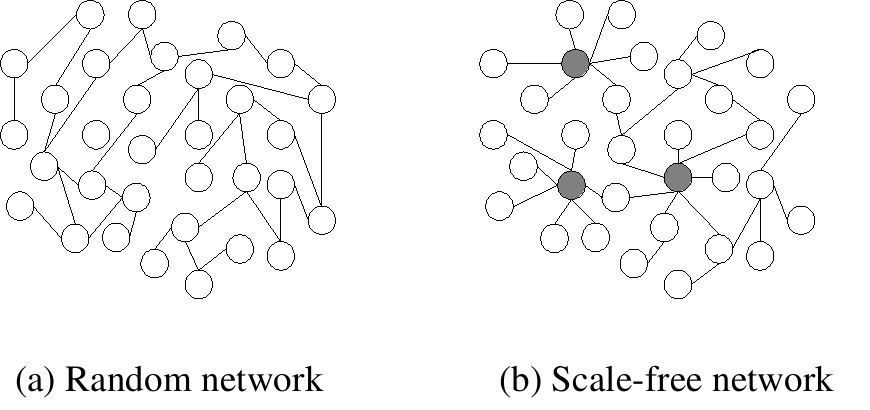
Random network (a) and scale-free network (b). In the scale-free network, the larger hubs are highlighted.

Emergence of hubs can be explained by the difference between scale-free networks and random networks. Scale-free networks (Barabási–Albert model) are different from random networks (Erdős–Rényi model) in two aspects: (a) growth, (b) preferential attachment.

- (a) Scale-free networks assume a continuous growth of the number of nodes N, compared to random networks which assume a fixed number of nodes. In scale-free networks the degree of the largest hub rises polynomially with the size of the network. Therefore, the degree of a hub can be high in a scale-free network. In random networks the degree of the largest node rises logarithmically (or slower) with N, thus the hub number will be small even in a very large network.
- (b) A new node in a scale-free network has a tendency to link to a node with a higher degree, compared to a new node in a random network which links itself to a random node. This process is called preferential attachment. The tendency of a new node to link to a node with a high degree k is characterized by power-law distribution (also known as rich-gets-richer process). This idea was introduced by Vilfredo Pareto and it explained why a small percentage of the population earns most of the money. This process is present in networks as well, for example 80 percent of web links point to 15 percent of webpages. The emergence of scale-free networks is not typical only of networks created by human action, but also of such networks as metabolic networks or illness networks. This phenomenon may be explained by the example of hubs on the World Wide Web such as Facebook or Google. These webpages are very well known and therefore the tendency of other webpages pointing to them is much higher than linking to random small webpages.

The mathematical explanation for Barabási–Albert model:

The steps of the growth of the network according to the Barabasi–Albert model ($m_0=m=2$)

The network begins with an initial connected network of $m_0$ nodes.

New nodes are added to the network one at a time. Each new node is connected to $m \le m_0$ existing nodes with a probability that is proportional to the number of links that the existing nodes already have. Formally, the probability $p_i$ that the new node is connected to node $i$ is

$$p_i = \frac{k_i}{\sum_j k_j},$$

where $k_i$ is the degree of the node $i$ and the sum is taken over all pre-existing nodes $j$ (i.e. the denominator results in twice the current number of edges in the network).

Emergence of hubs in networks is also related to time. In scale-free networks, nodes which emerged earlier have a higher chance of becoming a hub than latecomers. This phenomenon is called first-mover advantage and it explains why some nodes become hubs and some do not. However, in a real network, the time of emergence is not the only factor that influences the size of the hub. For example, Facebook emerged 8 years later after Google became the largest hub on the World Wide Web and yet in 2011 Facebook became the largest hub of WWW. Therefore, in real networks the growth and the size of a hub depends also on various attributes such as popularity, quality or the aging of a node.

== Attributes ==
There are several attributes of Hubs in a Scale-Free Network

=== Shortening the path lengths in a network ===
The more observable hubs are in a network, the more they shrink distances between nodes. In a scale-free network, hubs serve as bridges between the small degree nodes. Since the distance of two random nodes in a scale-free network is small, we refer to scale-free networks as "small" or "ultra small". While the difference between path distance in a very small network may not be noticeable, the difference in the path distance between a large random network and a scale-free network is remarkable.

Average path length in scale-free networks: $\ell\sim\frac{\ln N}{\ln \ln N}.$

=== Aging of hubs (nodes) ===
The phenomenon present in real networks, when older hubs are shadowed in a network. This phenomenon is responsible for changes in evolution and topology of networks. The example of aging phenomenon may be the case of Facebook overtaking the position of the largest hub on the Web, Google (which was the largest node since 2000).

=== Degree correlation ===
The perfect degree correlation means that each degree-k node is connected only to the same degree-k nodes. Such connectivity of nodes decide the topology of networks, which has an effect on robustness of network, the attribute discussed above. If the number of links between the hubs is the same as would be expected by chance, we refer to this network as Neutral Network. If hubs tend to connected to each other while avoiding linking to small-degree nodes we refer to this network as Assortative Network. This network is relatively resistant against attacks, because hubs form a core group, which is more reduntant against hub removal. If hubs avoid connecting to each other while linking to small-degree nodes, we refer to this network as Disassortative Network. This network has a hub-and-spoke character. Therefore, if we remove the hub in this type of network, it may damage or destroy the whole network.

=== Spreading phenomenon ===
The hubs are also responsible for effective spreading of material on network. In an analysis of disease spreading or information flow, hubs are referred to as super-spreaders. Super-spreaders may have a positive impact, such as effective information flow, but also devastating in a case of epidemic spreading such as H1N1 or AIDS. The mathematical models such as model of H1N1 Epidemic prediction may allow us to predict the spread of diseases based on human mobility networks, infectiousness, or social interactions among humans. Hubs are also important in the eradication of disease. In a scale-free network hubs are most likely to be infected, because of the large number of connections they have. After the hub is infected, it broadcasts the disease to the nodes it is linked to. Therefore, the selective immunization of hubs may be the cost-effective strategy in eradication of spreading disease.
