= Polytechnic University of Cartagena =

Technical school in Spain

Technical University of Cartagena
- Universidad Politécnica de Cartagena
- Official logo
- Type: Public technical university
- Established: September 4, 1883
- Affiliations: European University of Technology
- Academic staff: 576
- Administrative staff: 368
- Students: 5396
- Undergraduates: 4,476
- Postgraduates: 612
- Doctoral students: 308
- Location: Cartagena, Spain
- Campus: Urban
- Mascot: Naranjita
- Website: www.upct.es

The Technical University of Cartagena (Spanish: Universidad Politécnica de Cartagena) is a technical university in Cartagena, Spain. It was established on September 4, 1883.

== Structure ==
The university has three campuses, all located within the urban area of Cartagena.

=== Faculty Structure ===
- Campus Alfonso XIII
  - Faculty of Agricultural Engineering (ETSIA)
  - Faculty of Naval and Oceanic Engineering (ETSINO)
  - Faculty of Civil and Mining Engineering (EICM)
- Campus Muralla del Mar
  - Faculty of Industrial Engineering (ETSII)
  - Faculty of Telecommunications Engineering (ETSIT)
  - Institute of Plant Biotechnology (IBV)
  - Research Laboratory Building (ELDI)
- Campus CIM
  - Faculty of Economic and Business Science (FCCE)
  - Faculty of Architecture and Building (ETSAE)

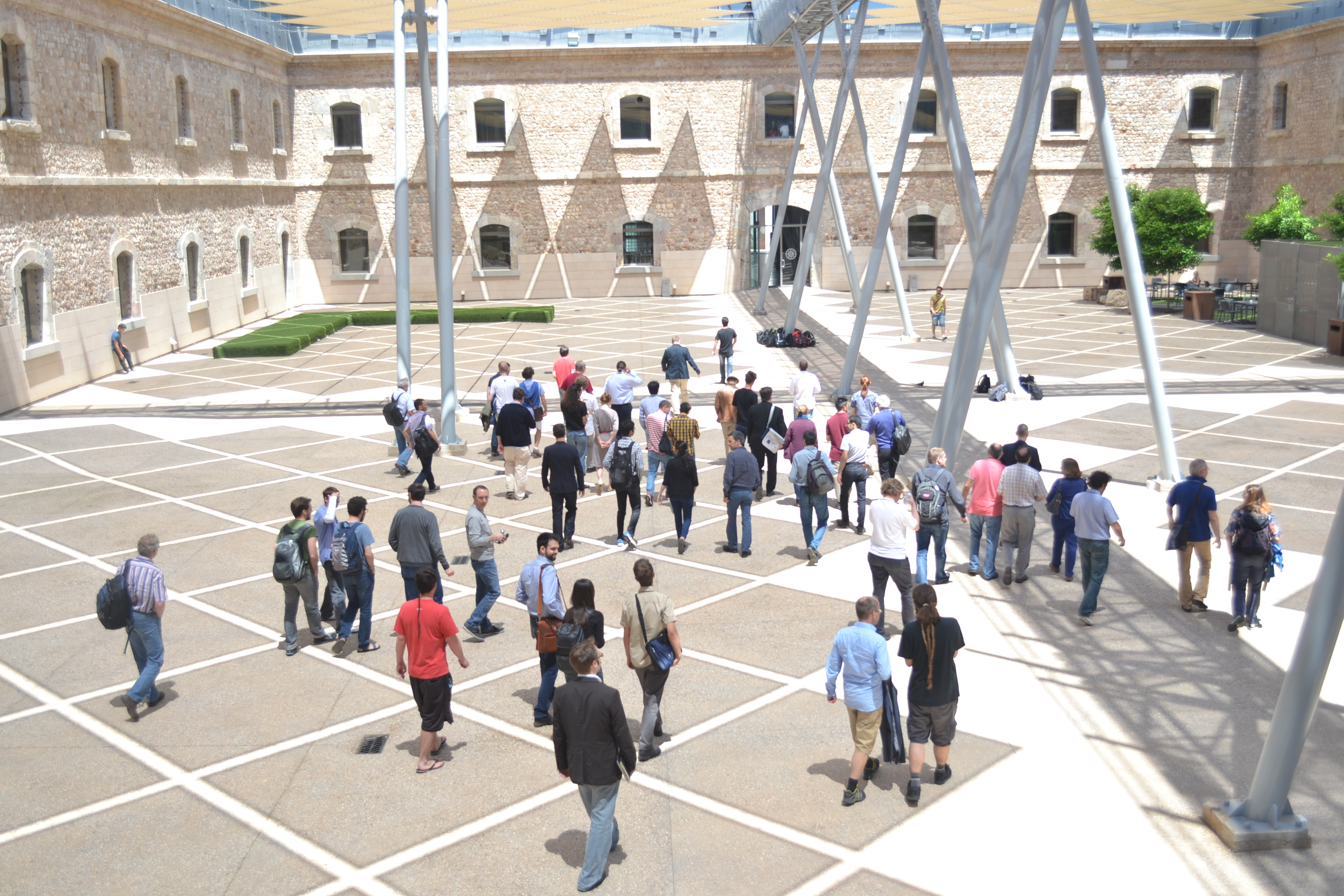
Faculty of Economic and Business Science
