= University of Cassino and Southern Lazio =

Italian university

Coordinates: 41°29′35″N 13°49′43″E

- Università degli Studi di Cassino e del Lazio Meridionale
- Latin: Universitas Studiorum Casinas
- Other names: Unicas, University of Cassino
- Motto: Sol per noctem
- Motto in English: Sun through the night
- Type: Public
- Established: 1979
- Affiliations: European University of Technology
- Rector: Marco Dell'Isola
- Students: 6,983
- Location: Cassino, Frosinone, Gaeta, Provinces of Frosinone and Latina
- Campus: Rural
- Sporting affiliations: CUS Cassino
- Website: www.unicas.it/welcome-eng

The University of Cassino and Southern Lazio (Italian: Università degli Studi di Cassino e del Lazio Meridionale), Unicas, University of Cassino, was established in 1979. It is an Italian public university headquartered in Cassino, with a branch in Frosinone.

With seven programmes (two Bachelor's degrees and five Master's degrees) entirely taught in English and more than 1500 international students from 58 different nationalities, the University of Cassino is now established as a district for International Studies, a significant excellence among Italian universities.

In the Angevin-Aragonese castle of Gaeta, there is a university conference hall.

It's part of the European University of Technology group.

== Organisation ==
UNICAS is a generalist, welcoming, and inclusive university engaged in education, research, technological transfer, and public engagement. Its five departments cover a wide spectrum of areas ranging from STEM disciplines to arts and humanities, including social, economic, and legal sciences, as well as psychology, pedagogy, and foreign-language teaching.

== See also ==
- List of universities in Italy
- Cassino
- Gaeta
- Frosinone
