= Gerrard Street, London =

Street in Chinatown, London

Coordinates: 51.5117°N 0.1311°W

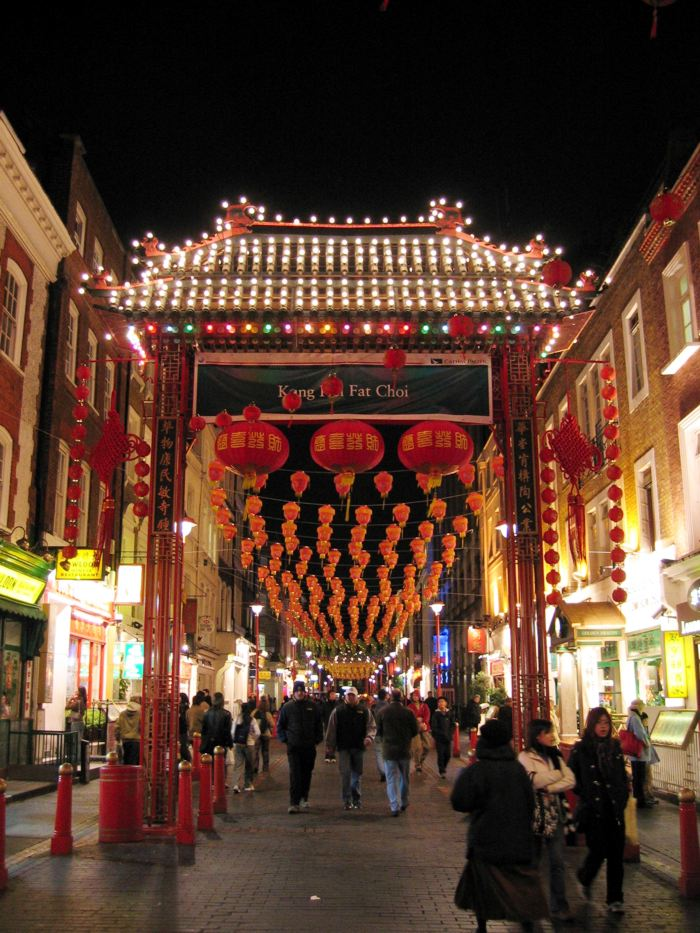
Gerrard Street is highly decorated for special occasions, here for Chinese New Year 2004.

Gerrard Street (Chinese: 爵祿街; pinyin: Juélù Jiē) is a street in the West End of London, in the Chinatown area.

The street was built between 1677 and 1685 and originally named Gerrard Street after the military leader Charles Gerard, 1st Earl of Macclesfield who owned the land and used it as a training area. It was developed by the physician Nicholas Barbon. By the mid-18th century, it was known more for its coffee houses and taverns than as a place of residence.

== Residents ==
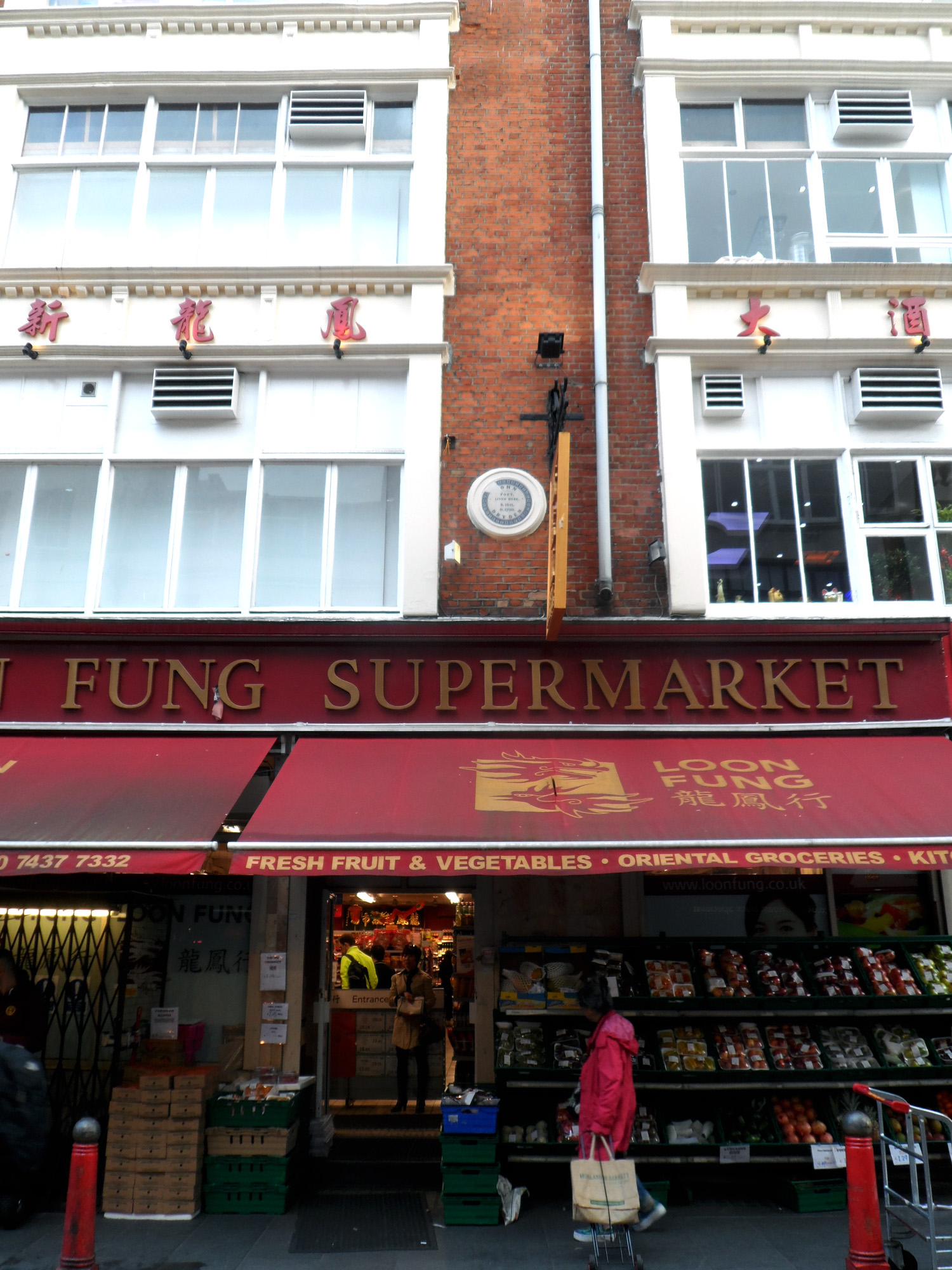
43 Gerrard Street

John Dryden (1631–1700) lived for a while at 43 Gerrard Street, which is commemorated by a blue plaque. This building was later occupied by Rudolph Appel in 1851. Here he ran an anastatic lithography printing business until he relinquished the business in favour of Samuel Cowell of Ipswich in 1858. Another plaque, on number 9, marks the meeting of Samuel Johnson and Joshua Reynolds at the Turk's Head Tavern to found The Club, a dining club, in 1764.

In fiction, Charles Dickens sets the home of Mr Jaggers, the lawyer in Great Expectations, in "a house on the south side of that street. Rather a stately house of its kind, but dolefully in want of painting, and with dirty windows [and with ...] a stone hall... a dark brown staircase ... dark brown rooms... panelled walls". A Royal Society of Arts blue plaque commemorates Edmund Burke at 37 Gerrard Street.

In 1953, No. 4 Gerrard Street was a small studio where the theatrical photographer George Harrison Marks and his partner Pamela Green, lived and worked. By the late 1950s, with the success of Kamera Publications, they had taken over No. 5 next door and had a much larger studio on the top floor. In the early 1960s, the ground floor at No. 4 became a gallery. The director Michael Powell copied their sets for the classic film Peeping Tom, in which Green also starred.

== Businesses ==
In 1907, the National Telephone Company built a telephone exchange at 32 Gerrard Street. It was rebuilt by the Office of Works in 1935-7. The building is now used as an arts and exhibition venue.

In the Roaring Twenties, the 43 Club was set up at number 43, as a jazz club notorious for outrageous parties frequented by the rich and powerful. It was eventually closed down by direct order of the Home Office and the proprietor, Kate Meyrick, was imprisoned.

In 1956 number 44 was taken over by the owners of the 2i's Coffee Bar on Old Compton Street as a second branch in response to the original 2i's rapid success. The building had previously hosted a folk and skiffle club run by John Hasted. In the late 1960s it became Happening 44, a club with décor mixing psychedelic and bondage aesthetics, featuring bands such as The Deviants. The building later became a Chinese supermarket.

A basement in Gerrard Street was the location of the first rehearsal of Led Zeppelin in August 1968, where they played "Train Kept A-Rollin'". The exact location of the basement is unknown, and it is believed to have been converted into business premises many years ago.

Ronnie Scott's Jazz Club started in Gerrard Street in the basement of No. 39. Samuel Johnson and Joshua Reynolds met at the Turk's Head Tavern to found their dining club, The Club in 1764. The site is commemorated by a plaque at No. 9.
