= Charles Patrick Graves =

British writer (1899–1971)

- Born: 1 December 1899; Wimbledon, London, England
- Died: 20 February 1971 (aged 71); Barbados
- Education: St John's College, Oxford
- Occupation: Writer
- Spouse(s): Margaret Leigh, Vivien Winch
- Father: Alfred Perceval Graves
- Relatives: Bishop Charles Graves, Alfred Graves, Robert Graves, Philip Graves, Arnold Graves, Ida Poore, Cecil Graves, Robert Perceval Graves, Ida Graves, John Graves, Tomás Graves, Lucia Graves, Ada Graves, Frances Gordon, Leopold von Ranke, Margaret Graves
- Writing career
- Period: 1920s – 1960s
- Genres: Journalist, travel writer, historian and novelist

Charles Patrick Ranke Graves (1 December 1899 – 20 February 1971) was a British journalist, travel writer, historian and novelist. He came from a large literary family. Among his nine siblings were the writers Robert Graves and Philip Graves.

== Early life ==
He was born at Red Branch House, Wimbledon, England, on 1 December 1899. His father was Alfred Perceval Graves (born in Dublin, 22 July 1846) who worked in the Home Office before becoming a senior inspector of schools. Graves senior also wrote poems and ballads and was a noted folklorist. His second wife, and the mother of five of his children, including Charles, was Amalie (Amy) Elizabeth Sophie (or Sophia) von Ranke, the daughter of a professor of medicine at the Ludwig-Maximilians-Universität München.

Charles Graves attended Rokeby Preparatory School. He followed in his brother Robert's footsteps to Copthorne prep, and then, in 1913, to Charterhouse. His part-German heritage caused problems at school and harassment from fellow students during World War I.

He left Charterhouse in March 1918 and enlisted in the Royal Fusiliers. He was still undergoing officer training when the war came to an end.

He enrolled at St John's College, Oxford where he studied English. Always interested in sport, he became the captain of the golf team and played cricket and ice hockey.

He undertook additional instruction outside the university. In 1920, he became the first student to enroll in the London School of Journalism, founded that year by Sir Max Pemberton. He became the assistant editor of the student magazine The Isis. He later served as the editor, during which time its circulation increased from 1,200 to over 3,000. He also became the Oxford correspondent for the Daily Express.

== Journalism ==
He started full-time work for the Daily Express in 1921. Later he worked for the Evening News, Sunday Express, Daily Mail, Daily Graphic, Sunday Chronicle, Sunday Dispatch and many other newspapers, magazines and periodicals, often as a freelance contributor. He was at various times a theatre reviewer, crime reporter, sports writer, war correspondent, travel writer and gossip columnist.

His work as a gossip columnist required regular attendance at theatre first nights, balls, parties, nightclubs, prize fights, race meetings and travel overseas to attend similar events in mainland Europe. He would often travel, at the expense of his newspaper, to Dinard, La Baule-Escoublac, Biarritz, Cannes, Deauville, Le Touquet, Venice and other resorts of the rich and famous in the 1920s and 1930s and write of who and what he saw and heard there. This brought him into contact with celebrities, politicians, sportsmen, royalty and business leaders, some of whom became friends. His literary friends included George Bernard Shaw, P. G. Wodehouse, Somerset Maugham and Rudyard Kipling. Some of them wrote introductions to his books.

Beatrice Lillie, Gertrude Lawrence, Owen Nares, and Fred and Adele Astaire were some of his friends in show business. Other associates were cartoonist Tom Webster, dancer Irene Castle and writer Michael Arlen.

Among his scoops in journalism was to break the news that Elizabeth Bowes-Lyon had become engaged to the Duke of York, the future King George VI.

He went to and reported on the dances and parties attended by the Bright young things, a group of Bohemian young aristocrats and upper-class socialites in London in the 1920s, and he sometimes took part in their pranks. He was a regular at Quaglino's, the Embassy Club, Ciro's, the Café de Paris, the Kit Kat, the Hambone Club and other nightclubs and restaurants, all of which was used in his reportage of Café Society.

When he became the news editor on the Sunday Express it brought him into more regular contact with senior newspapermen like Beverley Baxter, Lord Kemsley, Lord Camrose and Lord Beaverbrook.

One of his side projects was to ghost-write a memoir by Richard Speaight, society and court photographer, that was serialised in the Daily Express in 1926. This, and some of his other special projects, were syndicated to newspapers in other English speaking countries.

He believed his social column should be all about entertainment. He seldom mentioned politics, even in the late 1930s when war was looming. Instead, he tried to distract readers with amusing stories about sporting events and other leisure activities.

A shortage of newsprint during the war saw newspapers shrink in size and gossip columns almost disappear. As the 1940s progressed he gradually turned from journalism to the writing of commissioned histories and travel books.

== Books ==
He was a versatile writer and the author of 46 books, both non-fiction and fiction, on a variety of subjects. His literary agent was Raymond Savage. His publishers included Nicholson & Watson, Hutchinson & Co and Hodder & Stoughton. His working method was to compile extensive notes by hand and then dictate to a secretary who would take it down in shorthand and then type up the first draft.

Every summer after they married he and his wife would travel to the continent and hire a car and driver and tour popular resorts where they would stay at the best hotels. He would play golf during the day and they would visit high class restaurants and casinos at night. He was fascinated by high stakes gambling and wrote two books on the subject and often mentioned it in other books and articles. He did a certain amount of gambling himself and his wife hints at occasional financial difficulties in her memoir about their life together. Each of those holidays would result in a new travel book.

== Personal life ==
He was briefly engaged to the socialite and actress Elvira Barney. When he broke off the engagement she turned up at his home at Chelsea with a loaded pistol. In a much later incident she was tried for the murder of a man who was shot dead when she was living with him at the time.

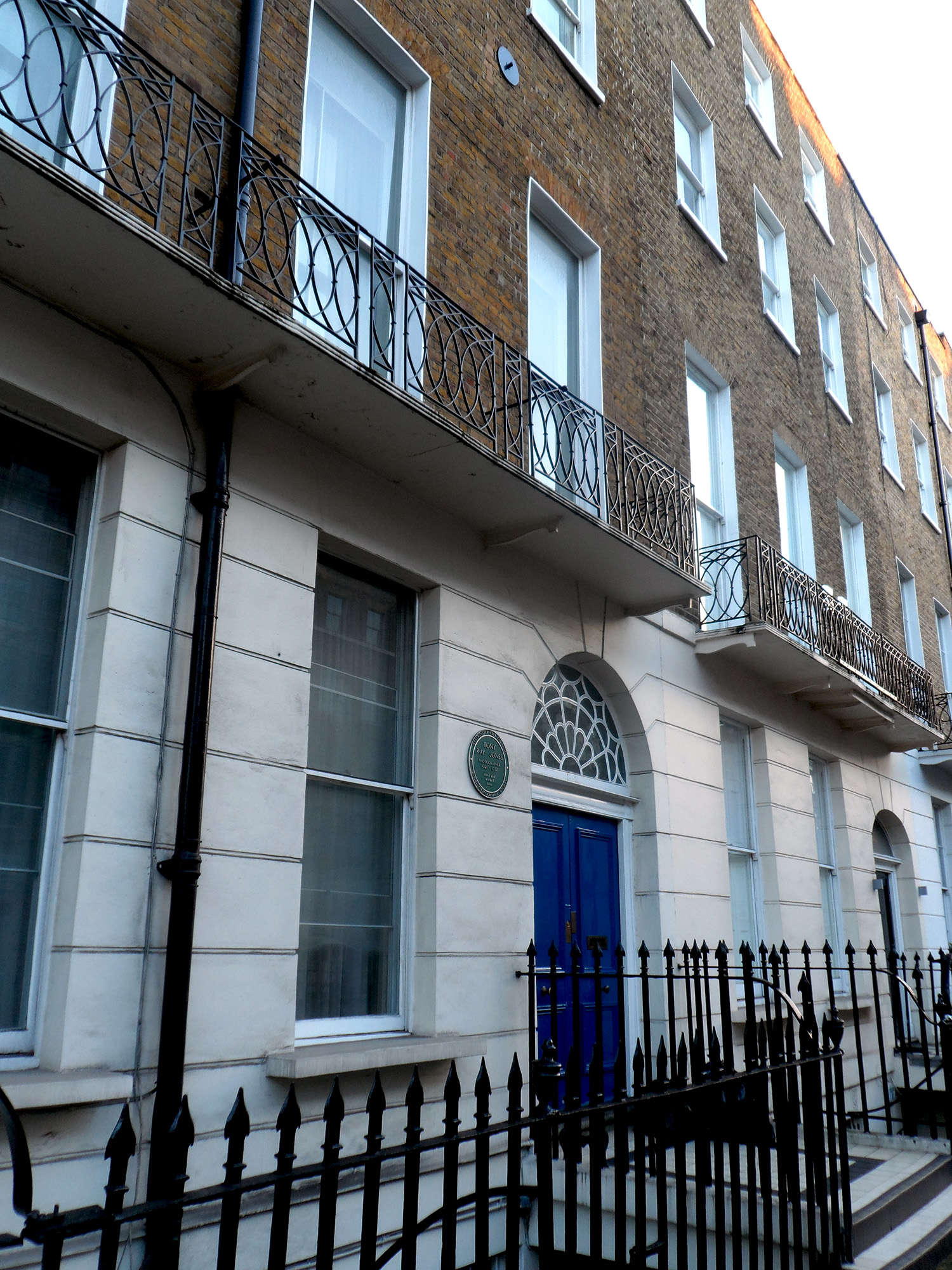
102 Gloucester Place, Marylebone, London

On 17 December 1929 he married Margaret Ethel Leigh (1901–1962) a paediatric nurse. Among their wedding guests were Stanley Baldwin and Rudyard Kipling. They had been a couple five years prior to the marriage during which time he persuaded her to try her hand at writing. She became a part-time journalist, writing under the pen-name Jane Gordon, and she later wrote a number of books. She was earning £500 from her writing and he £1,750 per annum when they married in 1929. The newly-weds moved into a large Regency style terrace house at 70 (later 102) Gloucester Place, London, where they employed four servants. Early in the marriage his wife realised he was careless with money and she took charge of their household finances.

Physically, he was tall (6’ 3") and thin and had brown hair. Socially, he was affable and gregarious. He enjoyed good food and drink and was a heavy smoker. His main hobbies were golf and gin rummy. He and his wife often dined out or went to nightclubs. They also did much entertaining at home. After dinner he liked to stay up late with their guests playing cards, poker, bridge, bezique, backgammon, chess "... any card game at reasonably high stakes. I have seen him lose quite a lot of money at snakes and ladders," said his wife.

During World War II, the couple continued to live in London throughout The Blitz. He researched and wrote by day, and served in the Home Guard at night. His wife continued to work as a hospital nurse, the workload increased with casualties from the night-time bombing. On Sunday evening, 8 December 1940, as they were preparing for bed, an incendiary bomb struck their house and set fire to the roof. The same thing happened again during a major bombing raid on 10 May 1941.

He did wartime radio broadcasting for the BBC. As part of his research for the books he wrote about the RAF he flew with one of their air-crews on a bombing raid over Germany. In February 1945 he and his wife accompanied a group of war correspondents across the channel and toured Belgium and the Netherlands shortly after the German occupation had ended.

His wife died in 1962 and, four years later, he married again. His second wife was Vivien Winch (1912–1975) who he married on 22 September 1966. It was her third marriage. Both she and his first wife had aristocratic connections. The newly-weds initially lived in her house on the island of Guernsey. They had moved to the warmer waters of the Caribbean and the island of Barbados by April 1969.

He was living on Barbados, in Villa Fustic, an 11-acre estate with a large 18th-century house owned and redesigned by his wife using the services of Oliver Messel in the 1960s, when he died on 20 February 1971. A memorial service was held in London at St Bride's, Fleet Street, on 17 March. It was attended by his widow, relatives, friends as well as representatives of the Associated Newspapers Group, the National Advertising Corporation, The Press Club and the British Guild of Travel Writers.

Some of his personal papers were sold at an auction of books, manuscripts and letters in 1976. These included correspondence from Bing Crosby and Marlene Dietrich.

== Legacy ==
Graves was one of those who chronicled and defined high society in London in the 1920s and 1930s. His institutional histories continue to be a source of information for the organisations concerned. He was also a prolific travel writer who helped to popularise international travel as a desirable leisure time activity. His writing on that subject saw him described in The Times as, "The Laureate of the pleasure resorts."

His ability as a writer was assessed after his death by the literary editor of The Daily Telegraph. David Holloway,

As a writer Charles Graves was always under the shadow of his elder brother Robert, though, for most of his life, of the two he probably earned more by his pen. He had a lively style and could turn out books on a large number of subjects ... he turned his travel journalism and gossipy articles into a series of books where usually the guide book information was interspersed with anecdotes of high life.

== Bibliography ==
Graves wrote numerous travel books:

- And the Greeks (1930)
- Panorama (1932)
- Gone abroard (1932)
- Gone abroad again (1933)
- The Riviera revisited (1935)
- Trip-tyque (1936) travel in Spain
- Deauville taxi (1937) travel in France
- Swiss Summer (1938)
- You’re Welcome (1938) about America
- War over Peace (1940) about continental holiday resorts
- Holidays here (1946)
- Switzerland revisited (1947)
- Ireland revisited (1949)
- Italy revisited (1950)
- The Riviera revisited (1950)
- The Azure coast; the fabulous French Riviera, old and new (1957)
- Royal Riviera (1957)
- Fourteen islands in the sun (1965) about the Caribbean
- The rich man's guide to Europe (1966)
- Enjoy life longer (1970) about European spas

During World War II he wrote a number of "real life novels" about servicemen and wartime organisations:

- The Thin Blue Line; a true-life novel of the RAF as it is today (1941) film-rights sold but no film was made
- The Avengers (1942)
- Seven Pilots (1943)
- Five survive (1944)
- The Black Beret (1944) about a soldier in the Royal Armored Corps
- Dusk to dawn (1946)
- The thin red lines (1946) about allied lines of communication during the war

He was also commissioned to write a number of non-fiction books:

- Life line (1941) about daily naval operations off the British coast
- Off the record (1942) a war diary
- The Home Guard of Britain (1943)
- Drive for freedom; how Britain equipped her fighting services ... (1945)
- London Transport carried on; an account of London Transport at war, 1939–1945 (1947)
- The story of St Thomas's 1106–1947 (1947)
- Women in green; the story of the W.V.S (1948)
- The big gamble; the story of Monte Carlo (1950)
- The Royal Ulster Rifles, Vol.3 (1951)
- The Cochran story (1951) a biography of Charles B. Cochran
- Champagne and chandeliers; the story of the Café de Paris (1958)
- Palace extraordinary; the Story of St James (1963)

Some of his other books include the following:

- The price of pleasure (1935) a collection of his articles
- Candid caddies 1935) golfing stories
- Other people's money 1937)
- Cigars and the man (1939)
- Londoner's life (1942)
- The bad old days (1951) autobiography
- Leather Armchairs; the Chivas Regal book of London clubs (1963)
- None but the rich:the story of the Greek syndicate (1963)
- The legend of Linda Martel (1968) about faith-healing
- Invasion by virus; can it happen again? (1969) about the 1918-18 global flu pandemic
- Collected poems (1972)
