= Charles Graves (bishop) =

Irish mathematician, academic, and clergyman

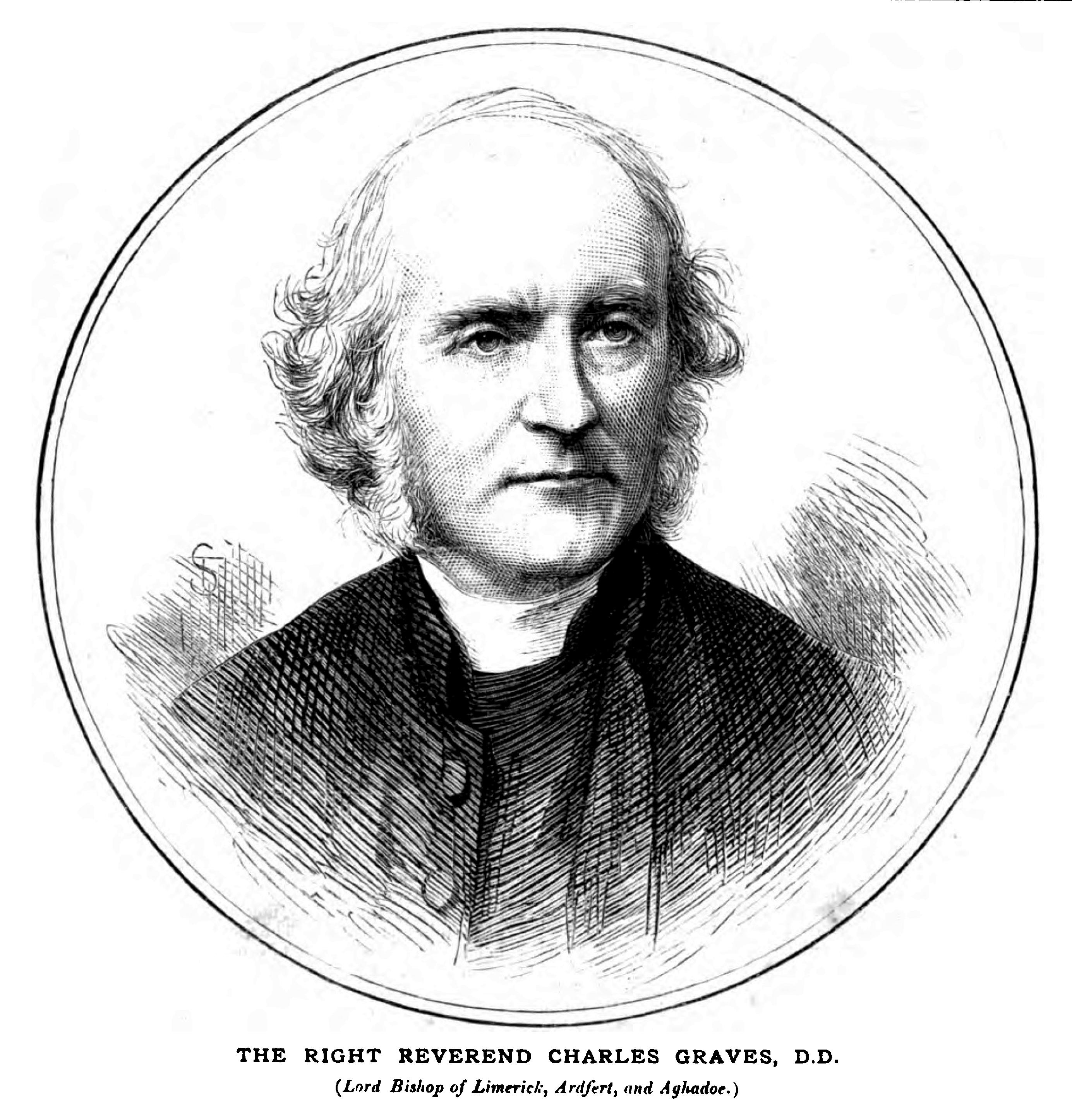
Charles Graves

Charles Graves (6 December 1812 – 17 July 1899) was an Irish mathematician, academic, and clergyman. He was Erasmus Smith's Professor of Mathematics at Trinity College Dublin (1843–1862), and was president of the Royal Irish Academy (1861–1866). He served as dean of the Chapel Royal at Dublin Castle, and later as Bishop of Limerick, Ardfert and Aghadoe. He was the brother of both the jurist and mathematician John Graves, and the writer and clergyman Robert Perceval Graves.

== Early life ==
Born at 12 Fitzwilliam Square, Dublin, the son of John Crosbie Graves (1776–1835), Chief Police Magistrate for Dublin, by his wife Helena Perceval, the daughter and co-heiress of the Revd Charles Perceval (1751–1795) of Bruhenny, County Cork. Helena enjoyed the patronage of John Freeman-Mitford, 1st Baron Redesdale, who married her second cousin, a daughter of John Perceval, 2nd Earl of Egmont.

Educated at Trinity College Dublin, he was elected a Scholar in classics in 1832, and in 1834 graduated BA as Senior Moderator in mathematics, getting his MA in 1838. He played cricket for Trinity, and later in his life did much boating and fly-fishing. He was a founder member of the University of Dublin Choral Society, with its first meeting held in his rooms in Trinity. It was intended that he should join the 18th (Royal Irish) Regiment of Foot under his uncle, Major-General James William Graves (1774–1845), and in preparation he had become an expert swordsman and rider.

== Career ==
Charles Graves was appointed a fellow of Trinity College in 1836, and in 1843 became Erasmus Smith's Professor of Mathematics, a position he held until 1862, when he became a senior fellow. In 1841, he published the book Two Geometrical Memoirs on the General Properties of Cones of the Second Degree and on the Spherical Conics, a translation of Aperçu historique sur l'origine et le développement des méthodes en géométrie (1837) by Michel Chasles, but including many new results of his own. His version was admired by James Sylvester.

Graves published over 30 mathematical papers, some of those later in life, after he had left TCD for the life of a clergyman. His post-TCD mathematical output includes, "On a Theorem Relating to the Binomial Coefficients" (1865), "On the Focal Circles of Plane and Spherical Conics" (1888), "The Focal Circles of Spherical Conics" (1889) and "On the Plane Circular Sections of the Surfaces of the Second Order" (1890) (all published in either the Proceedings or the Transactions of the Royal Irish Academy).

After leaving Trinity College, Graves followed in the footsteps of his grandfather, Thomas Graves, (appointed Dean of Ardfert in 1785 and Dean of Connor in 1802) and his great uncle, Richard Graves.

In 1860 he was appointed Dean of the Chapel Royal and, from 1864 to 1866, he was the dean of Clonfert before being consecrated as Bishop of Limerick, Ardfert and Aghadoe, a position he held for 33 years until his death in 1899. He had been elected a member of the Royal Irish Academy in 1837 and subsequently held various officerships, including president from 1861 to 1866. He was elected a Fellow of the Royal Society in 1880 and received the honorary degree of DCL from Oxford University in 1881.

A gentleman and a scholar he was well respected as the Bishop of Limerick. He and the Catholic Bishop (O'Dwyer) were on the very best of terms. They cracked Latin jokes at each other, discussed fine points of scholarship and were unclerical enough not to take their religious differences too seriously.

Bishop O'Dwyer had once joked at the size of Graves' family of nine and Graves retorted with the text about the blessedness of the man who has his quiver full of arrows, to which O'Dwyer replied "The ancient Jewish Quiver only held six."

== Publications ==
In 1841 Graves published an original mathematical work and he embodied further discoveries in his lectures and in papers read before and published by the Royal Irish Academy. He was a colleague of Sir William Rowan Hamilton and on the latter's death, Graves gave a presidential panegyric containing a valuable account both of Hamilton's scientific labours and of his literary attainments.

- Two Geometrical Memoirs on General Properties of Cones of the Second Degree (1841) translated from Michel Chasles

== Brehon Law Commission ==
Graves was very interested in Irish antiquarian subjects. He discovered the key to the ancient Irish Ogham script which appeared as inscriptions on Cromlechs and other stone monuments. He also prompted the government to publish the old Irish Brehon Laws, Early Irish Law. His suggestion was adopted and he was appointed as secretary of the Brehon Law Commission set up to accomplish this. Appointing Eugene O'Curry and John O'Donovan as translators, the Commission created facsimile copies of the original document using the process of anastatic lithography which had been showcased by Samuel Cowell at the Great Exhibition of 1851. The commission produced twenty facsimile copies which they produced in-house under a license to use the patent which cost them £10 a year for three years. These enabled copies of the original documents to be circulated to major libraries and some copies were cut up to help produce a glossary for those involved in the translation. As secretary of the Commission, Graves provided reports to parliament as to how the commission implemented this innovative technique.

== Private life ==
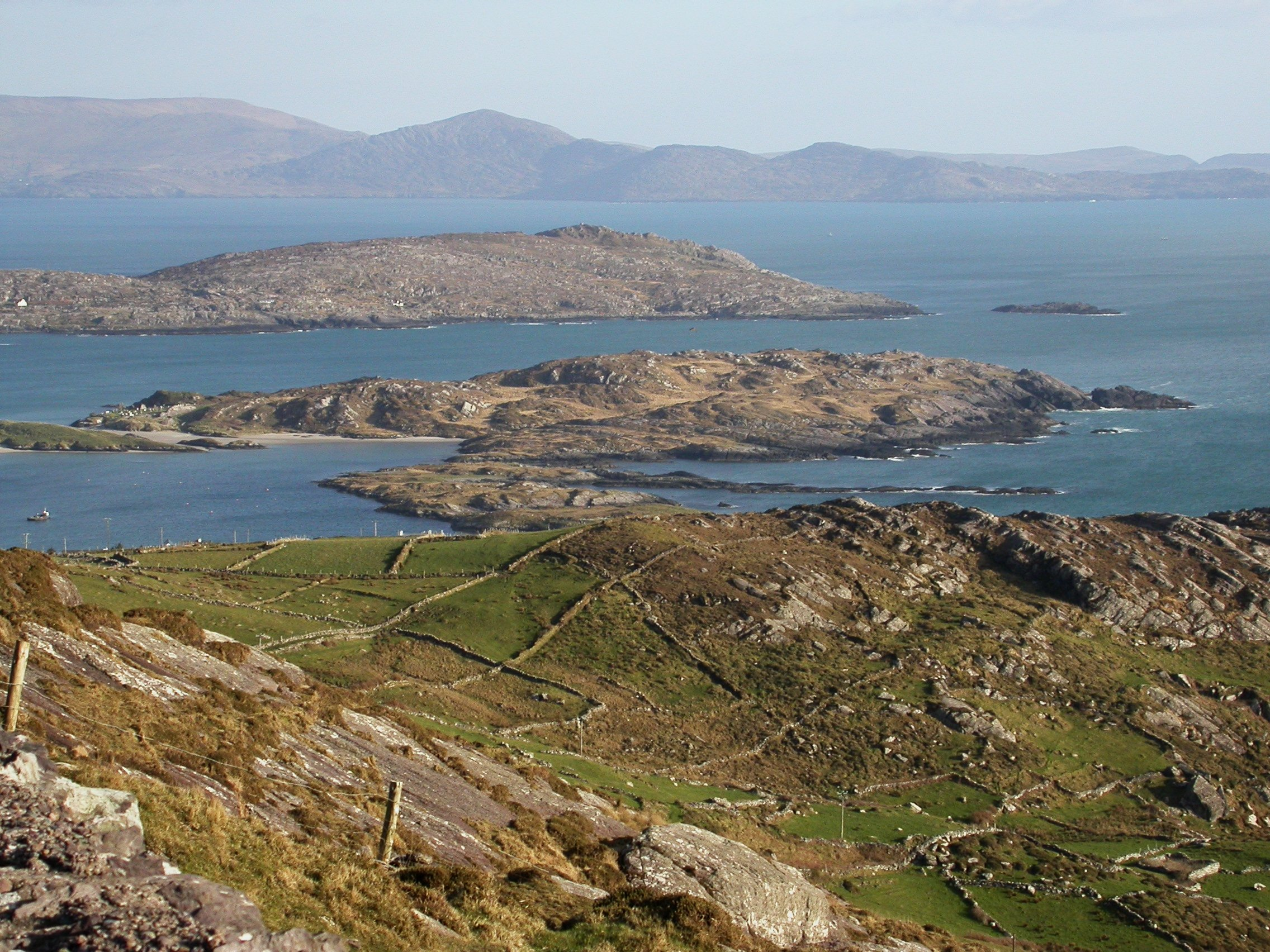
View from Parknasilla House

His official residence was "The Palace" at Limerick, but from the 1850s he took the lease of "Parknasilla House", County Kerry, as a summer residence. In 1892 he bought out the lease of the house and a further 114 acres (0.46 km^{2}) of land that included a few islands. In 1894 he sold it to Great Southern Hotels, who still own it to this day.

On 15 September 1840, Charles Graves married Selina, daughter of John Cheyne, Physician-General to the Forces in Ireland, an associate of Graves's father's cousin, Robert James Graves. Graves was the father of the poet Alfred Perceval Graves (1846–1931), of Arnold Felix Graves (1847–1930), the founder of (what is now) Dublin Institute of Technology, of the writer and critic Charles Larcom Graves (1856–1944), and of the diplomat Sir Robert Wyndham Graves (1858–1934) and of the writer Ida Margaret Graves Poore. He was the grandfather of Philip Graves, Robert Graves, Charles Patrick Graves and Cecil Graves.

== Arms ==
Coat of arms of Charles Graves

Notes
Confirmed by John Bernard Burke, Ulster King of Arms,30 December 1863.
Crest
A demi-eagle displayed and erased Or encircled 'round the body below the wings with a ducal coronet Gules each wing charged with a cross patonce also Gules.
Escutcheon
Quarterly 1st & 4th Per pale Gules and Azure an eagle displayed ducally crowned Or in the dexter chief point a cross patonce of the last 2nd & 3rd Argent on a chief indented Gules three crosses pattee of the field a crescent for difference.
Motto
Aquila Non Captat Muscas
