= Charles d'Aiguebelle =

French painter and lithographer

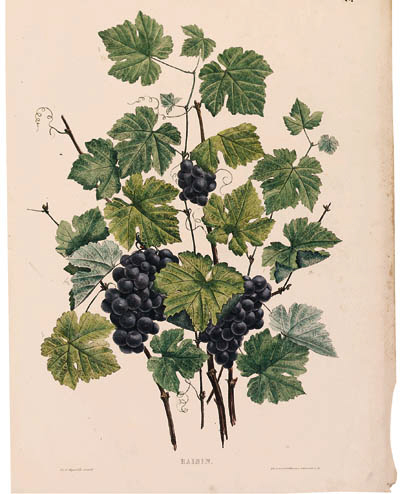

Charles d'Aiguebelle is noted for his single publication "Homographie ... Choix de vingt Plantes indigènes et coloniales" published in Paris in 1828 by Fain, and dedicated to the Duchess de Berry. The work consists of 20 hand-coloured lithographic and nature-printed plates by Bernard and d'Aiguebelle, each with accompanying text by L. Madale.

Charles d'Aiguebelle used a combination of lithography and nature printing for preparing the plates of this work, and termed the process 'Homographie'. Leaf specimens were coated in wax and applied to the lithographer's stone, the other parts of the plant were then superimposed and the whole printed as a single image. This technique struck a good balance between the accurate detail achieved by nature printing, and the artistic effect brought about by the lithographic process. Further publications which never materialised were promised by d'Aiguebelle - "nous donnons ici vingt planches, formant la premiere anne d'une collection de cent vingt planches, tant exotiques qu'indigènes. Nous offrons aussi aux amateurs une autre Collection de quatre cent trente-deux plantes, et livrables de mois en mois, per cahier de six planches".

Charles d'Aiguebelle was awarded a silver medal at the Paris Exposition of 1834 for his “transports sur pierre d’impression anciennes”, the anastatic process of lithography. History attributes the invention to Baldermus of Berlin. It was introduced to England in 1844 by William Siemens and patented in the name of Joseph Woods of Bucklersbury. Later in the same century its invention was claimed by a certain Rudolph Appel.

The d'Aiguebelles originate from Upaix and Montgardin, and are descended from Bertrand d'Aiguebelle.
