= Sir Richard Poore, 4th Baronet =

Royal Navy Admiral (1853–1930)

Admiral Sir Richard Poore Bt KCB CVO JP DL
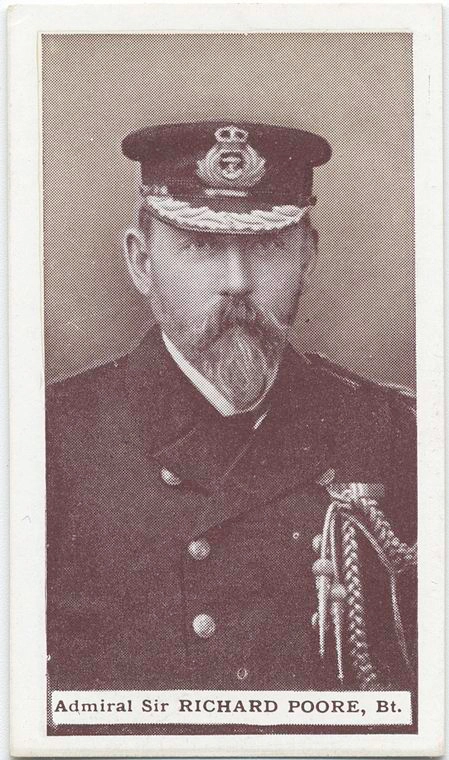
- Born: 7 July 1853; Cobourg, Ontario, Canada
- Died: 8 December 1930 (aged 77); Vevey, Switzerland
- Military career
- Allegiance: United Kingdom
- Branch: Royal Navy
- Service years: 1866–1917
- Rank: Admiral
- Commands: HMS Hawke; HMS Illustrious; Australia Station; Nore Command
- Conflicts: Mahdist War; World War I
- Awards: Knight Commander of the Order of the Bath; Commander of the Royal Victorian Order; Grand Officier of the Légion d'honneur Grand Officer of the Order of the Crown of Italy

Admiral Sir Richard Poore, 4th Baronet, KCB, CVO, JP, DL (7 July 1853 – 8 December 1930) was a Royal Navy officer who served as Commander-in-Chief, The Nore.

== Naval career ==
Poore served in the Naval Brigade as part of the Perak expedition to Malaya in 1875. He also took part in the Bombardment of Alexandria in 1882 and the unsuccessful Nile Expedition to Khartoum to relieve General Gordon in 1884. He became captain of HMS Hawke in 1897 and in that capacity was involved in operations that led to the pacification of Crete later that year. In April 1898 he was appointed in command of the battleship HMS Illustrious, also serving in the Mediterranean.

On 9 March 1900 he was appointed flag captain to HMS Vivid, flagship and yacht to the port admiral at Devonport, for command of the RN Barracks. In June 1901, he was appointed a Naval Aide de Camp to King Edward VII. He transferred to a more operative command in December 1902, when he was appointed Captain of the pre-dreadnought battleship HMS Jupiter, serving in the Channel Fleet.

He was promoted rear-admiral on 30 August 1903, and became Rear Admiral for the Mediterranean and Channel Fleet in 1904. After promotion to vice-admiral on 1 March 1907, he became Commander-in-Chief of the Australia Station in 1908. Finally he became Commander-in-Chief, The Nore in 1911, serving in that post into World War I. He retired in 1917. On 19 July 1920, he was appointed a deputy lieutenant of Wiltshire.

== Honours and awards ==
- 11 August 1905 - On occasion of the visit of the French fleet Rear-Admiral Richard Poore, Bart, is appointed a Commander of the Royal Victorian Order.
- 25 June 1909 - In the 1909 Birthday Honours Vice-Admiral Sir Richard Poore, Bart, CVO, is appointed a Knight Commander of the Order of the Bath.
- 16 September 1919 - Admiral Sir Richard Poore, Bart, KCB, CVO is given permission to wear the decoration of a Grand Officier of the Legion of Honour conferred by the President of the French Republic for distinguished services rendered during the war.
- 16 September 1919 - Admiral Sir Richard Poore, Bart, KCB, CVO is given permission to wear the decoration of Grand Cross of the Order of the Crown of Italy conferred by the King of Italy for distinguished services rendered during the war.

== Personal life ==
In 1885, he married Ida Margaret Graves, daughter of Rt Rev Charles Graves, sister of Alfred Perceval Graves, and aunt of poet Robert Graves. They had one son:

- Sub.-Lt. Robert Poore RN (27 June 1886 – † 19 September 1915)

He lived at the East End Manor in Durrington in Wiltshire.

He died in Vevey, Switzerland, in 1930. After his death, the baronetcy was inherited by his nephew Edward Poore (1894–1938), son of his younger brother, Herbert. His wife died in Switzerland on 5 February 1941. She was the author of a number of books.

Military offices
| Preceded by Sir Wilmot Fawkes | Commander-in-Chief, Australia Station; 1908–1910 | Succeeded by Sir George King-Hall |
| Preceded by Sir Charles Drury | Commander-in-Chief, The Nore; 1911–1915 | Succeeded by Sir George Callaghan |
Baronetage of Great Britain
| Preceded by Edward Poore | Baronet (of Rushall); 1893–1930 | Succeeded by Edward Poore |
