= Brehon Law Commission =

The Brehon Law Commission was established in 1852 to translate the Senchus Érenn, a collection of early Irish legal tracts more commonly known as the Brehon Laws, a corrupted transliteration of the Irish word breatheamuin. James Henthorn Todd and Charles Graves had submitted an appeal to the short-lived British Conservative government in 1852.

Eugene O'Curry and John O'Donovan were appointed as translators. Facsimile copies of the original document we're created using the process of anastatic lithography which had been showcased by Samuel Cowell at the Great Exhibition of 1851. The commission produced twenty facsimile copies in-house, under a license to use the patent costing £10 a year for three years. Some copies were circulated to major libraries and others were cut up to help produce a glossary for those involved in the translation.

== Composition of the Commission ==
The Commission started its work on 7th December 1852 with the following members:

- James Henthorn Todd
- Charles Graves
- George Petrie
- Thomas Larcom
- David Richard Pigot
- Francis Blackburne
- Baron Monteagle
- Sir Joseph Napier
- Edwin Wyndham-Quin
- William Parsons, 3rd Earl of Rosse
- Lord Talbot de Malahide
- Thomas Romney Robinson
