= List of archaeological sites in County Cork =

A list of archaeological sites in County Cork, Ireland.

== Bantry Area ==
=== Bantry Archaeology ===
- Coastal Promontory Fort, Dromclogh
- Franciscan Friary, Abbey extant 1466 suppressed 1542
- Fulacht fiadh, Dromclogh,
- Holy Well, Beach 15th. August
- Iron Working Site, pre-1685
- Ringfort, Ardhoolihane, Beach, Booltenagh, Bunbuttern West, Cappanaloha West, Clonee, Curraghavaddra, Dromtahineen, Lissakeemig, Mullagh, Rooska East
- Standing Stone, Beach, Dromclogh

=== Bantry Area Townlands ===
All in the parish of Kilmocomoge, most in the Barony of Bantry, some in the Baronies of West Carbery (West Division) one (Glanycarney) in East Carbery (East Division)

- Abbey, Ard na mBrathar ('monks' height). Burial ground, friary iron working site.
- Aghaghooheen, Achadh Ui Ghuithin (Guheen's field)
- Ahil Beg and More, Athchoill (regrown wood). Standing stone.
- Ahildotia, Athchoill Doite (burned regrown wood)
- Ardaturrish Beg and More, Ard na dTuras (height of the pilgrimage). Burial ground coastal promontory fort.
- Ardnacloghy, Ard na Cloiche (height of the stone)
- Ardnagashel, Ard na gCaiseal (height of the forts)
- Ardnageehy Beg and More, Ard na Gaoithe (windy height). Standing stone.
- Ardnamanagh,
- Ardrath, Ard Rath (high fort)
- Ards More East and West, Na hAird (the heights)
- Ardhoolihane, Ard Ui Uallachain (Houlichan's height)
- Ballylickey, Beal atha na Leice (mouth of the fording flagstone)
- Ballynamought, Baile na mBocht (town of the poor)
- Bantry Town, Beanntrai (people of Beannt)
- Barnagearagh, Ban na gCaorach (field of the sheep)
- Baurgorm, Barr Gorm (blue top)
- Beach
- Breeny Beg and More,
- Caher, Cathair (stone fort)
- Caherdaniel East and West, Cathair Dhomhnaill (Donal's fort)
- Cahermoanteen, Cathair an Mhointin (fort of the coarse moor)
- Cahermuckee, Cathair an Mhuici (fort of the swineherd)
- Cahernacrin, Cathair an Achrainn (fort of the strife)
- Cahergullane, Cathair an Ghallain (fort of the standing stone)
- Cappaboy Beg and More, Ceapach Buidhe (yellow tillage plot)
- Cappanaboul, Ceapach na bPoll (plot of the pits)
- Cappanabrick, Ceapach na mBroch (field of the badgers)
- Cappanaloha East and West, Ceapacn na Luaithre (plot of the ashes)
- Cappanavar, Ceapach na bhFear (field of the men)
- Carran, Carn (monumental heap of stones)
- Carriganass, Carrig an Easa (rock of the waterfall)
- Carrigboy, Carrig Buidhe (yellow rock)
- Carrignagat, Carrig na gCat (rock of the cat|squirrels?)
- Chapel Island and Little,
- Clashduff, Clais Dhubh (dark hollow)
- Clonee, Cluain Fhia (meadow of the deer)
- Cloonygorman, Cluain Ui Ghormain (Gorman's meadow)
- Close, Clos (enclosure)
- Cooleenlamane, Cuilin Lomanach (bare remote place)
- Coomacroobeg, Cum an Chrubaigh (field of the hoofed animal)
- Coomanore North and South, Cum an Iubhair (valley of the yew tree)
- Coomclogh, Cum Cloch (valley of the stones)
- Coomleagh East and West, Cum na Lia (valley of the boulders)
- Coorloum Easr North and West, Cuar Lom (bare bend)
- Corrycomane, Cuar an Choimeaid (bend of the storage)
- Corryleary, Cuar Ui Laoghaire (O'Leary's bend)
- Coumaclavlig, Cum an Chnaimharlaigh (valley of the skeleton)
- Cousane, Cuasan (cavern)
- Crossogue, Crosog, (little cross)
- Crowkingle,
- Cullenagh, Cuillenagh (place of holly)
- Curraglass, Currach Glas (green bog)
- Currakeal, Currach Caol (narrow bog)
- Curramore, Currach More (large bog)
- Dereenathirigh,
- Dereenkealig, Daoire an Chaolaigh (grove of the saplings)
- Dereenclooig,
- Dereengranagh,
- Dereenograne,
- Derryclogher,
- Derrycreigh,
- Derryarkane, Doire Urcan (grove of the bonhams/piglets)
- Derryduff Beg and More, Doire Dubh (dark oak wood)
- Derryfada, Doire Fada (long oak wood)
- Derryginagh East Middleand West, Doire Grianach (sunny grove)
- Derrynafinchin, Doire na Fuinnseann (grove of the ash trees)
- Derrynakilla, Doire na Cille (grove of the burial ground)
- Deryvahalla, Doire Machalla (oak grove of the echoes)
- Dromacapull, Drom an Chapaill (ridge of the horse)
- Dromaclarig, Drom an Chlaraigh (ridge of the plateau)
- Dromacoosane, Drom an Chuasain (ridge of the littlecave)
- Dromanassa, Drom an Eise (ridge of the path)
- Drombrow, Drom Bro (ridge of thequern stone)
- Dromclogh East and West, dRom Cloch (ridge of the stones)
- Dromdoneen and East and West, Dromdoneen East, Drom an Duinin (ridge of the little fort)
- Dromdaniel, Drom Ui Dhomhnaill, (O'Donnell's ridge)
- Dromduff East and west, Drom Duff (black ridge)
- Dromgariff, Drom Garbh (rough ridge)
- Dromkeal. Drom Caol (narrow ridge)
- Dromleigh North and South, Drom Liath (grey ridge)
- Dromloughlin, Drom Ui Lochlainn (O'Loughlin's ridge)
- Dromnafinshin, drom na Fuinnseann (ridge of the ash trees)
- Dromsullivan North and south, Drom Ui Shuilleabhain (O'Sullivan's ridge)
- Dunamark and Mill Lot, Dun na mBarc (fortress of the ships)
- Dunbittern East and West,
- Farranfada, Fearann Fada (long land)
- Garranboy Island, Garran Buidhe (yellow thicket)
- Gearagh, Gaorthai (wooden glens), Gaorthadh (wooded glen or stream)
- Glanareagh,
- Glanbannin Lower and Upper,
- Glanlough, Gleann an Lougha (glen of the lake)
- Gortacloona, Gort na Cluana (meadow field)
- Gortagarry, Gort an Gharrai (field of the garden)
- Gortloughra, Gort Luachra (field of the rushes)
- Gortnacowly, Gort an Chabhlaigh (field of the ruin)
- Gortroe, Gort Ruadh (red field)
- Gouree Beg and More, Guaire (sandbank)
- Gurraghy, Garraithe (gardens)
- Gurteenroe, Goirtin Ruadh (little red field)
- Glanycarney, Geann Ui Chearnai (Kearney's glen)
- Hog Island,
- Hollyhill,
- Horse Island,
- Illane, Oilean (island)
- Illauncrevveen
- Inchiclogh, Inse na gCloch (low stony meadow)
- Inchagoum, Inse na nGamhna (low meadow of the calves)
- Inchinarihen, Inse an Oirchinn (low meadow of the end)
- Inchiroe, Inse Ruadha (brown pasture|riverside)
- Iskanafeelna, Easc na Faoilinne (lady's esker)
- Kealaine, Caol na nOigheann (marsh of the river sources)
- Kealcoum, Caol Cam (winding marshy stream)
- Kealkill, Caol Choill (narrow wood)
- Keilnascarta, Cill na Scairte (church of the shrubbery)
- Kilmore,
- Kilnaknappoge, Cill na gCnopog (church of the hillocks)
- Kilnaruane, Cill na Rómhán (church of the Romans)
- Kinathfineen, Cill Naomh Fhianniain (St. Finnian's church)
- Kippaghingergill, Ceapach Inghir Ghil (plot of the bright grazing)
- Knockanecosduff, Cnocan na gCos nDubh (hillock of the maidenhair)
- Knocknamuck, Cnon na Muc (hill of the pigs)
- Lackeragh, Leaca Riabhach (striped hillside)
- Lacadane, Leaca Bhan (white hillside ?)
- Laharan East and West, Leath Fhearainn (section of the hill brow)
- Lararanshermeen,
- Letterlicky East Middle and West, Leitir na Leace (hillside of the flagstone)
- Lisheen, Lisin (little fort)
- Loughdeeveen, Leaca Diomhaoin (barren hillside)
- Lousy Castle Island,
- Maugha, Macha (cattle field)
- Maughanaclea, Macha na gClai (field of the fences)
- Maughanasilly, Macha na Saili (field of the willows|sallies)
- Maularaha, Meall an Reithe (knoll of the ram)
- Maulavanig, Meall an Mhanaigh (the monk's knoll)
- Maulinward, Meall an Bhaird (the poet's knoll)
- Mill Big and Little, Meall Beag (little knob)
- Mileencoola, Millin na gCuaille (knob of the posts)
- Newtown,
- Parkana, Pairceanna (fields)
- Rabbit Island,
- Raheen and Beg and More, Raithin (little fort)
- Rangaroe, Reaangai Rua (red ridges)
- Reenaadisert, Rinn an Disirt (point of the hermitage)
- Reenaknock, Rinn na gCnoc (point of the hills)
- Reenavanny, Rinn an Mhanaigh (monk's point)
- Reerour East and West, Rinn Reamhar (broad point)
- Reenydonagan, Rinn Ui Dhoinragain (Donegan's point)
- Scartbaun,
- Seafield,
- Shanaknock, Seana Chnoc (old hill)
- Shandrum Beg and More, Sean Drum (old ridge)
- Shanvallybeg,
- Sheskin, Seisceann (marsh)
- Shronagreehy, Sron na Gaoithe (windy promontory)
- Skahanagh and Beg Lower More, Sceitheanach (white thorn area)
- Slip, Sliop (opening)
- Snave, Snamh (ford|swim)
- Tooreen and South, Tuairin (grassland)
- Town Lots,
- Trawnahaha, Tra na hAithbhe
- Trawnamaddree, Trian na Madrai (area of the dogs)

== Bere island ==
- Battery, Ardaragh West, Cloonaghlin West
- Circular Enclosure, Greenane
- Hut Site, Ardaragh West
- Martello Tower, Ardaragh West, Cloonaghlin West (also Telegraph Station)
- Promontory Fort
- Ringfort, Cloonaghlin West, Greenane
- Signal Tower, Derrycreeveen
- Standing Stone, Greenane
- Wedge Tomb, Ardaragh West

== Cape Clear ==
=== Cape Clear Townlands ===
- An tArd Ghort
- Baile Iarthach Theas (Ballyieragh)
- Baile Iarthach Thuaidh
- Cill Leice Forabhain (Killickaforavane)
- Comalan (Comillane)
- Cnocan na mBairneach (Knockannamurnagh)
- Cnocan an Choimthigh (Knockanacohig)
- Coinlin (Keenleen)
- Crathach Thiar (Croha West)
- Crathach Thoir (Croha East)
- Creathuna (Carhoona)
- Gleann Iarthach (Glen West)
- Gleann Meanach
- Gleann Oirtheach
- Gort na Lobhar (Gortnalour)
- Lios O Moine (Lissamona)

All in Clear Island civil parish Barony of West Carbery (East Division)

=== Cape Clear Archaeology ===
- Boulder Burial, Gort na Lobhar (Gortnalour)
- Burial Ground, Baile Iarthach (Ballyieragh), Cill Leire Forabhain (Comillane), also Children's Burial Ground, Lios O Moine (Lissamona)
- Celtic Art Stone with later cross inscription Celtic Iron Age 600 BC - 400 AD, Crathach Thiar (Croha West)
- Church, Baile Iarthach (Ballyieragh) in ruins 1693
- Cross Slab, Lios O Moine (Lissamona), Baile Iarthach (Ballyieragh)
- Cup Mark Stone, Cill Leire Forabhain (Comillane) now in Cape Clear Museum
- Fulach Fiadh (Cooking Pit), Gort na Lobhar (Gortnalour), Cnocan na mBairneach (Knockannamurnagh)
- Holy Well, Cill Leire Forabhain (Comillane), Baile Iarthach (Ballyieragh) visited on St. Kieran's day 5 March
- Medieval post 1200 AD O'Driscoll Castle
- Passage Tomb 4000 - 2200 BC, Cill Leire Forabhain (Comilane) found 1880
- Promontory Fort Celtic Iron Age 600B, C. - 400 AD at Baile Iarthach (Ballyieragh), Cnocan na mBairneach (Knockannamurnagh)
- Ringfort, Lios O Moine (Lissamona)
- Signal Tower, Gleann Iarthach (Glen West) burned early 19th century
- Stone Pair, Cill Leire Forabhain (Comillane), Neolithic 4000 - 2200 BC
- Tower House and Bawn, Baile Iarthach (Ballyieragh) O'Driscoll

== Dursey Island ==
=== Dursey Island Archaeology ===
- Ballaun Stones, Killowen, Ballynacallagh
- Castle Site, Ballynacallagh O'Sullivan garrison 1602
- Cup Marked Stone, Ballynacallagh
- Graveyarg/Ruined Church, Ballynacallagh
- Hut Site, Killowen
- Radial Stone Enclosure, Maughanaclea
- Signal Tower, Tilickatina (see towers on Bere Island, Kilcrohane, Mizen Peninsula and Cape Clear)

=== Dursey Island Townlands ===
- Ballynacallagh
- Killowen
- Maughanaclea
- Tilickatina

== Mizen Head Peninsula ==
- Altar, Wedge Tomb Bronze Age 2200 BC-600 BC
- Arderrawinny, Portal Tomb 4000 - 2200 BC
- Ardintenant, O'Mahony Castle Medieval post 1200 AD
- Arduslough, Wedge Tomb Bronze Age 2200 BC-600 BC
- Ballybane West, Rock Art Bronze Age 2200 - 600 BC
- Barnatonicane, Church Graveyard and Ballaun Medieval post 1200 AD
- Castle Island, Shell Midden, O'Mahony Castle Medieval post 1200 AD
- Castlepoint, Promontory Fort Celtic Iron Age 600 b.c. - 400 AD, O'Mahony Medieval Castle
- Corradarrigan, Boulder Burial, Bronze Age 2200 - 600 BC
- Coosheen, Pillar Stone in Children's Graveyard Early Christian 400-1200 AD
- Croagh Bay, Church and Children's Burial Ground early Christian 400- 1200 AD
- Dunlough, Coastal Promontory Fort Celtic Iron Age 600 BC - 400 AD, Three O'Mahony Castles Medieval post 1200 AD,
- Dunbeacon, Stone Circle Bronze Age 2200 - 600 BC, Two standing stones nearby
- Dunmanus, Boulder Burial Bronze Age 2200-600 BC, O'Mahony Castle Medieval post 1200 AD
- Dooneen, Promontory Fort Celtic Iron Age 600 BC - 400 AD
- Kilangle, Church Early Christian 400 - 1200 AD
- Kilbrown, Church Well Bullaun
- Kilcoe, McCarthy Castle Medieval post 1200 AD
- Leamcon, Medieval Castle
- Lissacaha, Ringfort Celtic Iron Age 600BC - 400 AD
- Lisheen, Boulder Burial Bronze Age 2200 - 600 BC
- Lissagriffin, Kilmoe Church, Graveyard and Bullaun Celtic Iron Age 600 BC - 400 AD
- Meenvane, Ringfort Celtic Iron Age 600 BC - 400 AD
- Mount Gabriel, Copper Mines Bronze Age 2200 BC - 600 BC
- Murrahin North, Stone Alignment Bronze Age 2200 - 600 BC
- Rathooragh, Ringfort Celtic Iron Age 600 BC - 400 AD
- Rathruane, Ringfort Celtic Iron Age 600 BC - 400 AD
- Rossbrin, O'Mahony Castle Medieval post 1200 AD
- Skeagh, Passage Tomb 4000 - 2200 BC
- Toormore, wedge Tomb Bronze Age 2200 - 600 BC
- West Skeam (Island), Church and Graveyard Early Christian 400 - 1200 AD
- Whitehall, O'Driscoll Castle Medieval post 1200 AD

== Sheep's Head Peninsula ==
=== Durrus Archaeology ===
- Boulder Burial, Ballycomane
- Burial Ground, Brahalish, Clashadoo, Coolcoulaghta, Dunbeacon, Kilvenogue,
- Cairn, Coolcoulaghta, Moulinward
- Castle, Dunbeacon
- Church, Moulinward (In repair 1639 ruins 1699)
- Fulacht Fiadha (Cooking Pit), Dunbeacon, Celtic Iron Age 600 BC-400 AD
- Graveyard, Moulinward
- Holy Well, Dunbeacon
- Mill Stone, Brahalish
- Promontory Fort, Coolcoulaghta (Celtic Iron Age 600 BC-400 AD)
- Ring forts, Ballycomane, Brahalish, Clonee, Drumtahaneen, Dunbeacon, Gortyalassa, Kealties, Rushineska, Celtic Iron Age 600 BC-400 AD
- Shell Midden, Dunbeacon
- Standing Stones (Gallauns), Ballycomane, Coolcoulaghta (Stone Pair Bronze Age 2200 BC-600 BC, Kealties, Parkana
- Stone Row, Moulinward, Bronze Age 2200 BC-600 BC
- Stone Circle, Dunbeacon (Bronze Age 2200 BC-600 BC)
- Tower House (medieval post 1200 AD), Rossmore (O'Mahony|McCarthy?)

=== Durrus Townlands ===
- Ahagouna Ath Gamhna, 'Ford of the calves', in Clashadoo townland
- Ardogeena (152 acres) Ard na Gaoine, 'height of the flint stones'. On the east side is Lisdromaloghera (Lios Drom Luachra) fort of the rushy ridge.
- Ballycomane (1349 acres) Baile an Chumain 'town of the little valley'. Part of it is Ballinwillin (Baile an Mhuilinn) place of the mill. Boulder burial, ringfort and standing stone pair.
- Boolteenagh (148 acres) Buailtenach, 'summer pasture'. The high land at the south is called Knockboolteenagh (cnoc buailtineach) hill of the little boolies. Site of a possible souterrain, at the north side is a ringfort.
- Brahalish (784 acres) Breach Lios, 'spotted forts' or Braichlis (place of malt or fermented grain). On the west side is Brahalish Fort and the east Cummer Fort. In 1659 census written Bracklisse. Burial ground children, mill stone ringforts. Location of Brahalish Hoard of gold ornaments currently in the British Museum.
- Carrigboy (116 acres) Carraig Buidhe, 'yellow rock'. Location of Durrus village. The high road from here is built over land known as Carrig Cannon.
- Curraghavaddra (195 acres) Currach an Mhadra, 'the bog of the dog'. On the west side is a ringfort.
- Clonee (409 acres) Cluain Fhia, 'meadow of the deer' or Aodh's meadow. In the center is Clonee ringfort.
- Clashadoo (749 acres) Clasa Dubha, 'dark hollows'. Burial ground last burial 1930s. To the north on high boggy ground is Coolnaheorna or Coornaheorna leading to the 'Cumar', and beyond to Loch na Fola (lake of the blood), the stream on the western end has a deep hole formerly known as Poul Nora Poll Nora (nora's hole).
- Coolcoulaghta (1148 acres) Cul Cabhlachta, 'remote place of the ruins' or 'cul cuallachta', nook of the tribe or assemblage. Location of boulder burial, burial ground at Kileen Coolcoulaghta Church contains 1847 famine victims, cairn, coastal promontory fort, fulachta fiadh, ringfort, standing stone, a standing stone pair.
- Coomkeen (915 acres) Cum Caoin, 'gentle valley'. Possible massrock, on the south side is Screathan na Muice (stoney slope of the pig).
- Crottees (490 acres) Cruiteanna, 'humpy ridges'
- Dromreagh (842 acres) Drom Riabhach, 'striped/grey ridge', on the north side is Coill Breach (wolf wood). Possible souterrain, standing stone.
- Dromataniheen (97 acres) Drom a'tSeannaichin (ridge of the little fox). Ringfort on the south side.
- Dromreague (92 acres) Drom Reidh, 'even ridge'
- Dunmanus Dun Manus, 'fort of Manus'
- Durrus Dubh Ros, 'dark wooded promontory'
- Gearhameen (646 acres) Gaortha min, 'small wooded glen' On the east side is Coolnalong Castle seat of the McCarthy Muclaghs later the property of Lord Bandon.
- Gurteen (127 acres) Goirtin 'small field'
- Kealties (614 acres) Caolta, 'narrow strip of land/or marshes marshy streams'. On the south side is Ros na Bruighne (headland of strife), written Glinkelty (Gleann Caolta) on 17th century map of Petty. Standing stone and possible ringforts.
- Kiloveenoge Cill Ui Mhionoig, 'Minogue's church', or Cill Oighe Mhineog church of the virgin Mineog. Child burial ground, on the east side is a former Protestant Church built 1860 or the west side is the site of an old church and burial grounds..
- Lissareemig (78 acres) Lios a'Riamaigh (fort of victory). Ringfort in centre.
- Mannions Island Large and Small
- Moulivarde Meall an Bhaird, 'the bard's knoll'
- Mullagh (173 acres) ''Mullagh, 'summit'. Possible souterrain on the west side is Lissavully Fort (lios a'Mhullaigh) fort of the summit.
- Murreagh (199 acres) Muirioch, 'seaside marsh'. Location of disused grain store also used as a refuge for children in 1847. Disused slate quarry south end also standing stone.
- Parkana Pairceanna, 'fields'
- Rooska West 298 acres) East (295 acres) Riasca, 'marshes'. Disused lead mines on western side ringforts in West and East.
- Rossmore (310 acres) Ros Mor 'large copse or large promontory'. Location of Rossmore Castle in ruins former O'Mahony tower house and location of former slate quarry
- Rusheenasiska (84 acres) Ruisin an Uisce, 'little copse of the water'
- Teadagh (107 acres) Taodach, 'rugged land' or Teideach 'flat topped hill'
- Tullig Tullach, 'mound'

=== Kilcrohane Archaeology ===
- Ardahill, Ardintenant, Caher, Caheragh, Derrycluvane, Drumnea, Faunmore, Gortalassa, Gortaneish, Killoveenogue, Knockroe, Raferigeen, Letter East, Rossnacaheragh, Tullig Ringfort Celtic Iron Age 600 BC - 400 AD
- Aughaleigue, Gouladoo, Laherandota, Letter East, Holy well
- Ballytransna, Kilcrohane, Cashel
- Ardaneig, Caher, Farranamanagh, Gortnakilla, Killonoveenogue, Letter West, Kilcrohane, Burial Ground,
- Caherurlagh, Holed Stone for healing
- Dooneen, Galladoo, Keelovenogue, Promontory Fort Celtic Iron Age 600 BC - 400 AD
- Dromnea, Bardic School Medieval post 1200 AD, Ornamental Tower erected Lord Bandon, Holy Well (tober na nduanairidhe well of the poets), possible fulach fiadh
- Farranmanagh, Stone Row Bronze Age, Children's Burial Ground, Souterrain, Tower house (O'Daly), Gallaun (standing stone
- Gouladoo, Holy Well
- Letter West, Children's Burial Ground
- Kilcrohane, Souterrain
- Signal Towers, Tooreen

=== Kilcrohane Townlands ===
- Ahileague, Achadh na Liag (field of the boulders or flagstones|rocking-stone)
- Ardahill, Ard Athchoill (High new wood| possible connection to St. Eochaile)
- Ardanenig, (Ard an Aonaigh (height of the fair or assembly place)
- Ballieragh, (608 acres), Baile Iartharach (western townland), sometimes termed West Ballyroon. In the centre is Faill Bheag (small cliff)
- Ballyruin, (118 acres), Baile Ui Tuain (Ruane's townland) or Baile a'Ruadhain (place of the moorland). Here lie the ruins of the house occupied by the poet Angus na n-Aor O Dalaigh in 1610.
- Ballyroon Mountain (468 acres), Macha Damh (field of the bardic assemblies). On the west side is Doo LOugh Dubh Loch (black lake) and the ruins of a signal tower
- Ballintra, Baile na dTra (townland of the strands)
- Caher, (258 acres) Cathair (stone fort), in the centre is Bawnacaheragh Fort Badhun na Cathrach (enclosure of the fort) at the south and east sides are disused burial grounds and the east are the remains of an old schoolhouse which in the early 19th. century had 200 plus pupils
- Caher Mountain (222 acres), Slaibh na Cathrach (mountain of the stone fort), on the west side is Tooreenacaheragh Tuairin na Cathrach (little green or bleach yard of the fort)
- Cahergal, (125 acres), Cathair Gheal (white fort), the side of the caher is on the north side
- Caherurlagh, (31 acres), Cathair Iolrach (eagle fort) or Cathair Urlaidhe (stone fort of the skirmish) or Cathair Urlach (stone fort of long coarse grass), site of holed stone and ringfort
- Caherurlagh Mountain North (28 acres) South (24 acres), Sliabh Cathair Urlaidhe (mountain of the stone fort of conflict), on the west side is Cookturtaun Lough Cul a'Tortain (back of the hillock)
- Clash, (97 acres) Clais (hollow)
- Carrivaleen, Cathair an Mhillin (stone fort of the knoll)
- Cora, subdivision of Ballyruin
- Derrycluvane, Doire Clumhanta (remote oak grove)
- Dooneen, Duinin (little fort)
- Doonour, Dub Amhair (fort of music)
- Dromnea, Drom an Fhiaidh (ridge of the deer)
- Eskeraha, (332 acres) Eascracha (glacier ridge) or Eisc Ratha (marsh of the fort), site of ringfort
- Fahane, Faithchean (small green plot)
- Farranamanagh, Lower, Upper, Fearann na Mannach (monk's land)
- Fawnmore, Fan Mor (big slope)
- Foilbeag,
- Galladoo, Gabhla Dubha (dark forks|black hill shoulders)
- Gearhies, Gaorthai (wooded glens)
- Glanalin, Gleann na Linn (glen of the pools)
- Glenruin, Gleann Ruadhain (glen of the sparrowhawk)
- Gortnalassa, Gort an Leasa (fort field)
- Gortaneish, Gort an Ois (field of the fawn)
- Gortnakilla, Gort na Cille (field of the church)
- Gurtfahane, Gort Fahane (field of the thistle)
- Gortavallig, (314 acres), Gort an Bhealaigh (roadside field), location of disused copper mines and slate quarries on the west side
- Kilcrohane, Cill Crochain (Crohane's church)
- Killeen, Cillin (little church)
- Knockeens, Cnoichini (small hills)
- Knockroe, Cnoc Ruadh (red hills)
- Laherndotia, (69 acres), Leath Fhearann Doite (burned settlement side), also known as Mid Ballyroon, location of holy wells on the east side and on the south side is Tobernockphuca Tobar Cnoc a'Phuca (well of the pooka's hill)
- Laharndota Mountain (33 acres), Sliabh Leath- Fhearann Doighte (mountain of the half burned townland), on the south side is Laharndota Lough
- Letter East (259 acres), Lower (50 acres), Mountain (238 acres), West (117 acres), Leitir (wet hillside), on the south side is Toberanorane Tobar an Fhuarain (well of the cold spring) and Letter Lough, on the north east is Loughaunnabrickeen Lochaan a'Bhricin (little lake of the trout)
- Moulnaskeha, Meall na Sceithe (knoll of the bush)
- Raffrigeen, Rath Aimhirgin (aimhirgin's fort)
- Reennacoppul, Rinn na gCapall (horses point)
- Rhea or Reagh, (221 acres) (mountain flat or plateau)
- Rhearour, Rinn Reamhar (broad point)
- Rosskerrig, Ros na gCaorach (wooded promontory of the sheep)
- Rossnacaheragh, Ros na cathrach (copse of the fort)
- Tooreen, (355 acres) Tuairin (grassland|little drying or bleaching place) or sheepwalk. On the west side is Lough Akeen Loch a'Chinn, lake of the promontory, the extreme point is Ros Caorthach (headland of the round masses) or Sheeps Head.
- The Paddock
- Tullig, Tullach (mound)

== Sources ==
- Bruno O'Donoghue, Parish Histories and Placenames of West Cork, 1986, The Kerryman
- Archaeological Inventory of County Cork, Volume 1: West Cork, The Stationery Office, Dublin 1992 ISBN 0-7076-0175-4
