= Philip Graves =

Anglo-Irish journalist and writer (1876–1953)

- Born: Philip Perceval Graves; 25 February 1876; Ballylickey, County Cork, Ireland
- Died: 3 June 1953 (aged 76); Ballylickey, County Cork, Ireland
- Education: Oriel College, Oxford
- Occupation: Journalist
- Known for: Debunking The Protocols of the Elders of Zion as a forgery in 1919, correspondent of The Times in Constantinople before 1914

Philip Perceval Graves (25 February 1876 – 3 June 1953) was an Anglo-Irish journalist and writer. While working as a foreign correspondent of The Times in Constantinople, he exposed The Protocols of the Elders of Zion as an antisemitic plagiarism, fraud and hoax.

== Life ==
=== Early life and education ===
Graves, eldest son of the writer Alfred Perceval Graves (1846–1931), was born in Ballylickey, County Cork, Ireland, into a prominent Anglo-Irish family. He studied at Haileybury and Oriel College receiving a bachelor's degree from Oxford University in March 1900. He was the elder half-brother of the authors Robert Graves and Charles Graves.

=== Career ===
As a correspondent of The Times in Constantinople from 1908 to 1914, he reported on the events preceding World War I. In 1914, as a British citizen, he had to leave the Ottoman Empire due to the war. In 1915–1919, he served in the British Army in the Middle East war theatre. As a captain in Army Intelligence in Cairo he worked with T. E. Lawrence on the Turkish Army Manual for the Arab Bureau. His uncle Sir Robert Windham Graves had been British Consul in Erzurum (1895) and financial adviser to the Turkish government (1912) and worked for Civil Intelligence in Cairo during the same period.

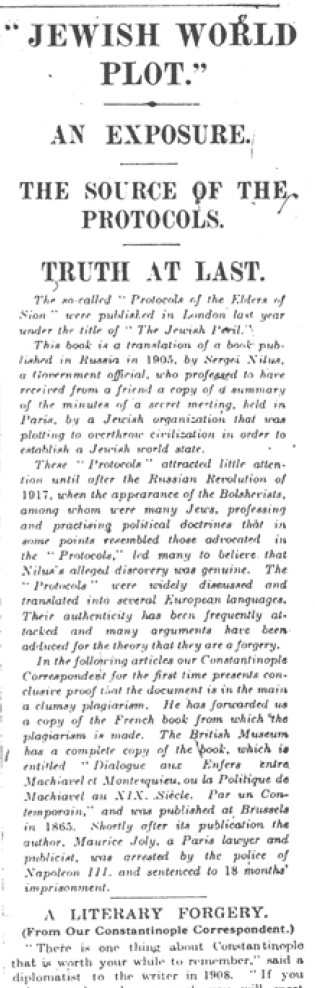
Graves exposed the Protocols as a forgery in The Times. 16–18 August 1921

After 1919, Graves reported from his own homeland on the Anglo-Irish War. He knew Michael Collins, W. T. Cosgrave, and other leaders of the Irish independence movement, and was closely involved in reporting events during this critical period of Irish history. He later worked as a foreign correspondent in India, the Levant and in the Balkans, before returning to London to work as an editor of The Times.

In 1921, he exposed The Protocols of the Elders of Zion as an anti-Semitic forgery in a series of articles in The Times.

His most monumental work was 22 of the 24-volume quarterly review of the events of and participants in World War II written during the conflict, the first two volumes being compiled by Sir Ronald Storrs.

=== Awards ===
Graves received numerous international awards and titles, among which are French Légion d'honneur that he received for his work in British intelligence during the First World War and the Order of the Crown of Italy.

=== Other interests ===
In his journeys, Graves developed an interest in entomology and published articles in scientific journals. He was member of the Royal Irish Academy.

=== Retirement ===
He retired in 1946 to Ballylickey and dedicated himself mainly to zoological hobbies. Here he made a study of the Irish butterflies, being especially interested in the local sub-species. He restored Ballylickey House as a hotel, which was taken over by his son after his death.

== Entomology ==
Graves specialised in butterflies (Lepidoptera) of Syria, Lebanon, Iraq, and Palestine, often working with Robert Eldon Ellison, a career diplomat and fellow Irishman (born in Wingstown, near Dublin).

His published work on insects reflects the strengths of his collection but not its extent. In 1938, for instance, he presented more than 2,500 specimens to the Natural History Museum, London. These are described in the catalogue of acquisitions Rhopalocera (Levant and Balkans). There are a few specimens, including an excellent series of Archon apollinus in the Ulster Museum, Belfast.

His published work on insects includes:

- Collecting Lepidoptera in Syria, 1905 Entomologist’s Rec. J. Var 18:125-6 (1906).
- Collecting in Syria: Ain Zhalta in May -June 1905. Entomologist's Rec. J. Var 18:149–152 (1906).
- A contribution to the fauna of Syria Entomologist's Rec. J. Var 23: 31–36 (1910).
- Two new Lycaenid subspecies from the Lebanon Entomologist 56: 154–157(1925).
- The Rhopalocera and Grypocera of Palestine and Transjordania Trans. Ent. Soc., London, 1925 17–125 (1925).
- with Ellison, R.E. The butterflies of the Jabal Quinesia, Lebanon Entomologist's Rec. J. Var 40:177–180 ( 1938).

An account of Graves work in entomology is given in Hesselbarth, G.; Oorschot, H. van & Wagener, S., 1975 Die Schmetterlinge der Türkei, Band 2: 1179 – 1199 [B 2189:2].

He is commemorated in the subspecies of the Brimstone butterfly found in Ireland, Gonepteryx rhamni gravesi Huggins, 1956.

== Personal life ==
Graves married Leila Millicent Knox Gilchrist, known as Millicent, and they had two children, including Elizabeth Millicent Graves, later Mrs Chilver, who in 1954 became Principal of Bedford College, London, and in 1971 of Lady Margaret Hall, Oxford.

His wife died in 1935.

Graves died on 3 June 1953 in Cork, Ireland.

== Political works ==
- Briton and Turk, London, Hutchinson Publishers, 1941
- Palestine, the land of three faiths, 1923
- The question of the straits, Ernest Benn Publishers, 1931
- Memoirs of King Abdallah of Transjordan (edited by P. Graves, translated from the Arabic by G. Khuri), London, Jonathan Cape, 1950

== Poetry ==
- The Pursuit, London, Faber and Faber, 1930 (in the same series of books as W.H. Auden's Poems and J.G. MacLeod's The Ecliptic advertised by Faber as "by the coming men".)
