= Robert Perceval Graves =

Irish biographer and Anglican priest

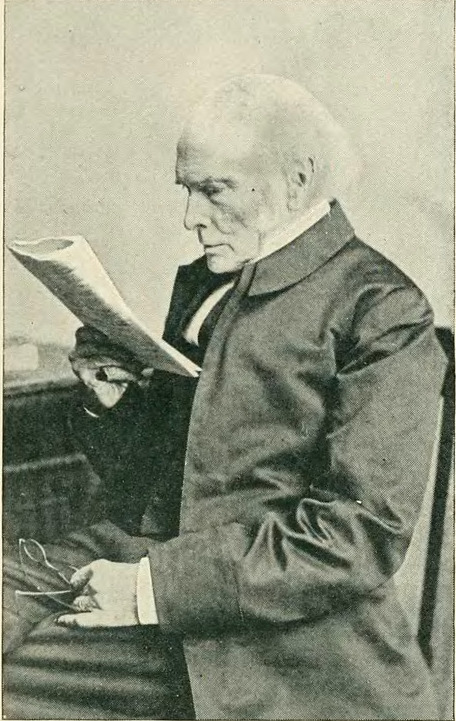
- Born: 9 March 1810; Dublin, Ireland
- Died: 5 October 1893 (aged 83); Dublin, Ireland
- Education: Trinity College Dublin
- Occupation: clergyman
- Spouse: Helena Hutchins Bellasis
- Relatives: Charles Graves; John T. Graves; Leopold von Ranke; Alfred Perceval Graves
- Writing career
- Notable work: Life of Sir William Rowan Hamilton

Robert Perceval Graves (9 March 1810 in Dublin – 5 October 1893 in Dublin) was an Irish biographer and clergyman, brother of both mathematician and bishop Charles Graves and jurist and mathematician John T. Graves. He was a brother-in-law of the German historian Leopold von Ranke who was married to his sister Helena Clarissa, and an uncle of the poet Alfred Perceval Graves. Graves is best known for his three-volume biography of W. R. Hamilton.

== Life and career ==
Robert Perceval Graves was born in Dublin. He was educated in classics at Trinity College Dublin (TCD), where he became a Scholar in 1830, got a BA in 1832 (Gold Medal) and an MA in 1837.

From 1833 to 1864 he worked as a clergyman in the Lake District in England, where he became friends with Wordsworth and Hartley Coleridge. On 31 May 1842 he married Helena Hutchins Bellasis (1809-1888), daughter of George Hutchins Bellasis (1778-1822), Captain in H.M. 19th Regt. of Light Dragoons, and Charlotte Maude (1778-1857), of Holly Hill, Windermere. He spent the last thirty years of his life back in Dublin, where he was sub-dean of the Chapel Royal, and taught at Alexandra College and also served as Vice Warden there. He was an early proponent of women being allowed access to the highest echelons of education, and in 1892 he published the pamphlet "Suggestions on the Subject of University Degrees for Women" in which he urged that his alma mater TCD should admit female students (which they finally did in 1904).

R. P. Graves is best remembered for his wide-ranging three volume Life of Sir William Rowan Hamilton, published in 1882, 1885, 1889. TCD recognised his accomplishment by awarding him an honorary doctorate (LLD) in 1890.

Graves died on 5 October 1893, and was interred at Mount Jerome, Dublin, on 9 October following a service at the Chapel Royal, Dublin.
