= Margaret Graves =

British writer and journalist

- Born: 24 January 1901
- Died: 29 August 1962
- Genre: self-help

Margaret "Peggy" Ethel Graves wrote as Jane Gordon born Margaret Ethel Leigh (24 January 1901 – 29 August 1962) was a British nurse, journalist and writer.

== Life ==
She was born in London in 1901. She was one of the two children of the Hon. Rowland Charles Frederick Leigh and Mabel (born Gordon). She wrote under the name of Jane Gordan although her first profession was as a nurse. She wrote in her spare time. She also did some modelling and her debut writing was on the Paris fashions for the Daily Express.

In 1934 she wrote 'Home Beauty Treatments' and this was a success and this was the theme of her writing until the 1950s.

During World War II, she wrote that she and Charles lived in London despite The Blitz. He was in the home guard and he wrote while she was still working as a hospital nurse dealing with casualties from the night-time bombing. On 8 December 1940, as they were preparing for bed, an incendiary bomb set fire to the roof of their house and this experience was repeated the following year.

Health and fitness became popular and her books recommended self-help by managing your diet and exercise. These ideas were available in the News Chronicle in the UK and in the New York Times and her books were Techniques for Beauty, Slimming, Jane Gordon's Beauty Book and Household Knowledge was published in 1955. The exception to this theme was her biography Married to Charles. This choice of title reflected her belief that her marriage was her greatest achievement. She had married Charles Patrick Graves in 1929 at a reception whose guests included Rudyard Kipling and Stanley Baldwin.

Graves died in 1962 in London. Her husband remarried in 1966.
