= Ballylickey =

Village in County Cork, Ireland

Ballylickey Béal Átha Leice
- Village
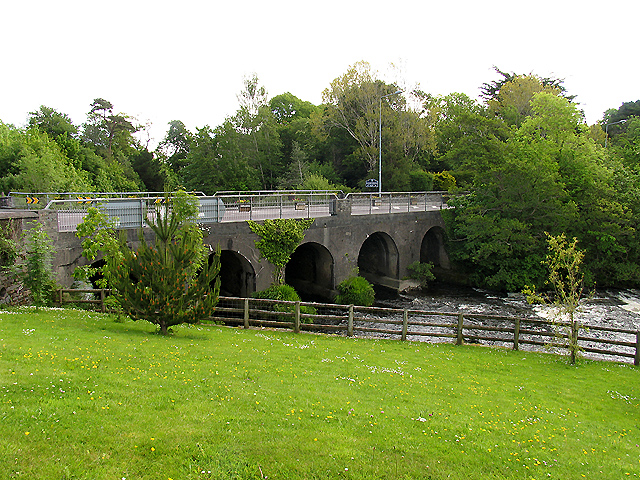
- Bridge at Ballylickey

- Location in Ireland
- Coordinates: 51°43′30″N 9°26′13″W
- Country: Ireland
- Province: Munster
- County: County Cork
- Time zone: UTC+0 (WET)
  - Summer (DST): UTC-1 (IST (WEST))

Ballylickey or Ballylicky (Irish: Béal Átha Leice) is a village on the N71 national secondary road and Bantry Bay near Bantry, County Cork, Ireland. The Ouvane River flows into Bantry Bay at Ballylickey.

== Tourism ==
There is a caravan park at Eagle Point. The Seaview Hotel is also located in the area.

The area's most prominent building is Ballylickey House, owned by the Graves family for generations and in modern times a hotel and Michelin-starred restaurant.

== People ==
- Philip Graves (1876–1953), journalist and exposer of The Protocols of the Elders of Zion as a hoax
- Ellen Hutchins (1785–1815), botanist
- Jeanne Rynhart (1946–2020), sculptor of the Molly Malone statue
- Seán Ó Sé (1936–2026), Irish traditional singer

== See also ==
- List of archaeological sites in County Cork
- List of towns and villages in the Republic of Ireland
