= Mount Gabriel =

Hill in County Cork, Ireland

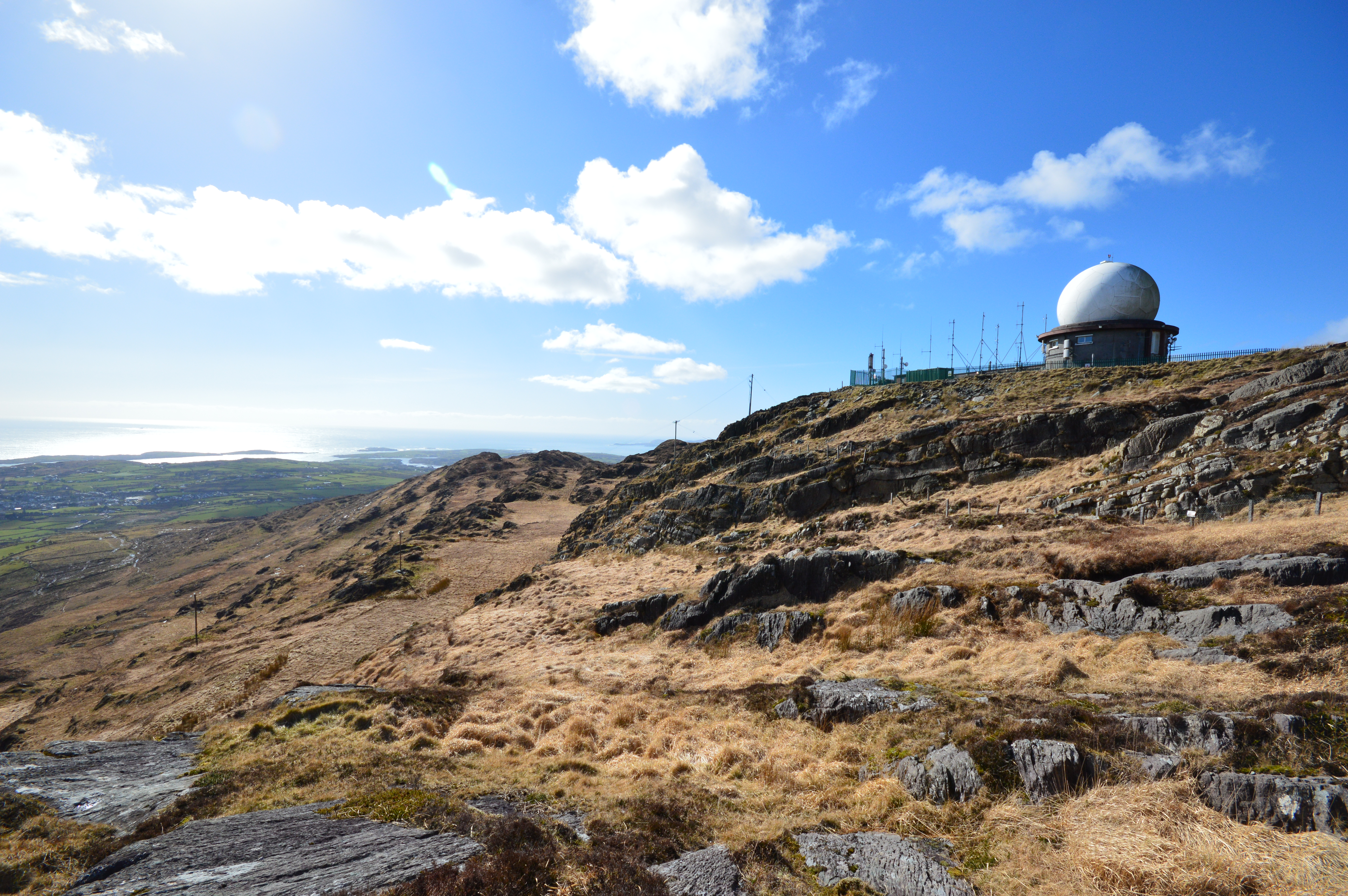
- View to a radar dome on the summit

Highest point
- Elevation: 407 m (1,335 ft)
- Prominence: 312
- Listing: Marilyn
- Coordinates: 51°33.00′N 9°32.19′W

Naming
- Native name: Cnoc Osta

Geography
- Location within Ireland
- Location: County Cork, Ireland
- OSI/OSNI grid: V761497

National monument of Ireland
- Official name: Mount Gabriel

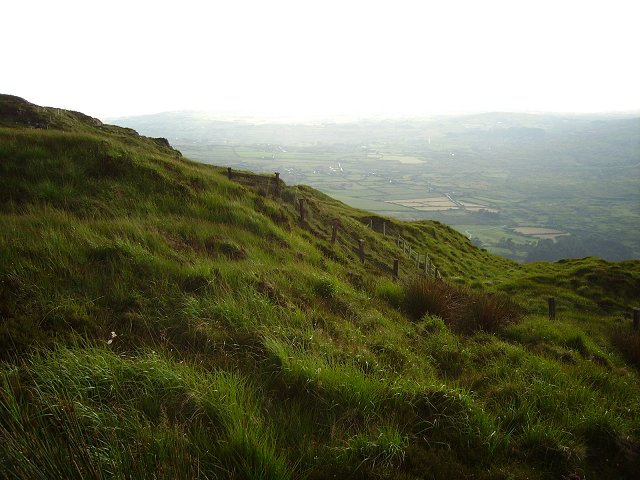
The mountainside to the west of the summit

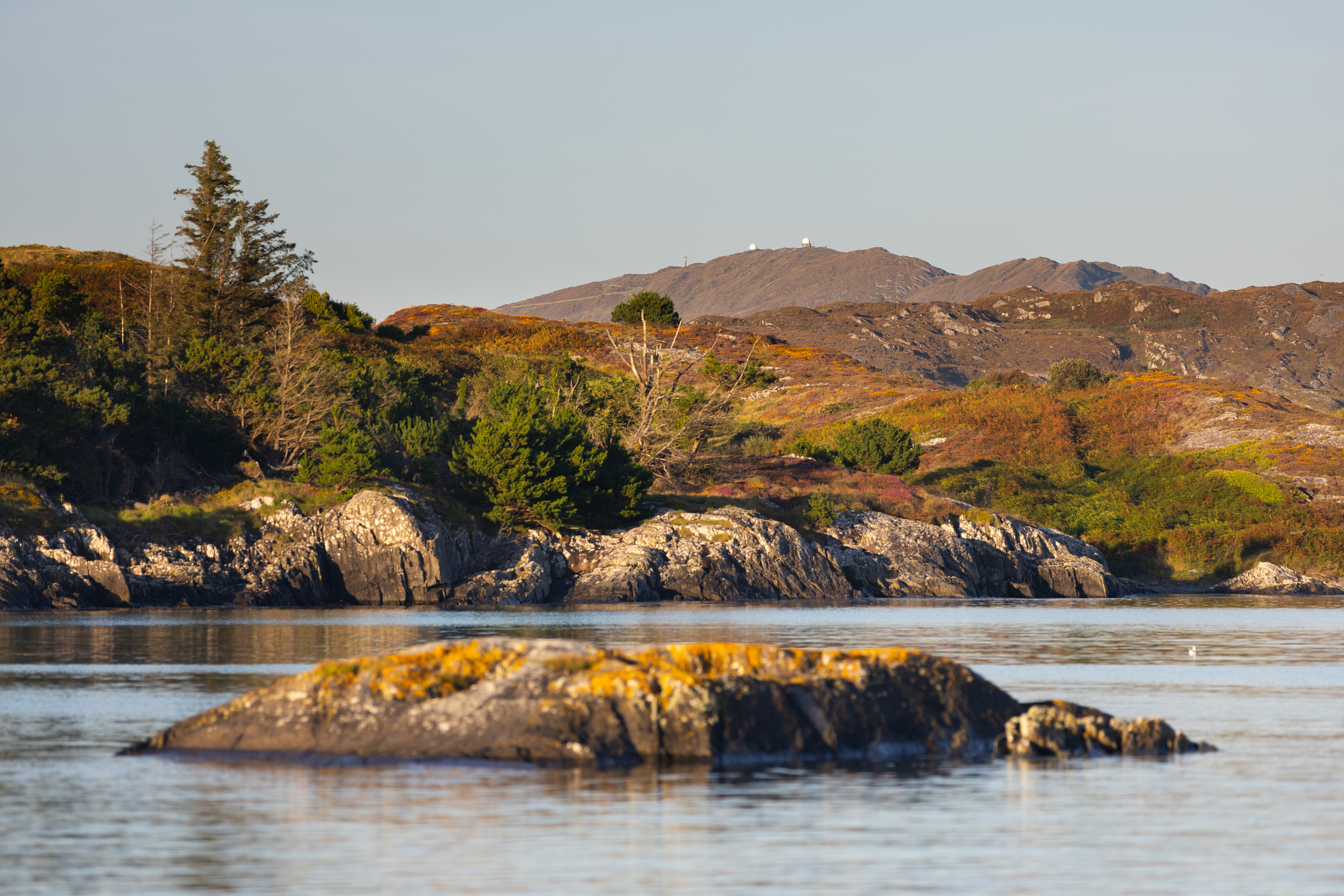
Mount Gabriel as seen from Ballyrisode Beach. Two radar domes visible.

Mount Gabriel (Irish: Cnoc Osta) is a large hill on the Mizen Peninsula, north of the town of Schull in County Cork, Ireland. The name Cnoc Osta means 'hill of the encampment', and was historically anglicized as 'Knock Hast'.

Mount Gabriel is 407 m (1,335 ft) high and is the highest eminence in the coastal zone south and east of Bantry Bay. A roadway serving the radar installations on the summit is open to the public.

From the peak of Mount Gabriel, there are views south over Schull Harbour and Long Island Bay. To the east and southeast, the views take in Roaringwater Bay and its many islands, known as Carbery's Hundred Isles. North and west are the mountains of the Beara Peninsula and south Kerry. Fastnet Rock is approximately 18 km (11 mi) to the south, and is visible in fine weather.

== Mining ==
On the southern and eastern slopes of the mountain there is evidence of Bronze Age mining, principally for copper. Some of the archaeological items found are now in the National Museum in Dublin.

== Radar domes ==
In the late 1970s, as part of the development of Eurocontrol (the European air traffic control system), two radar domes were built on the top of the mountain.

In September 1982 the Irish National Liberation Army, an Irish republican paramilitary group, blew up the radar domes, wrongly claiming that they were being used by NATO in violation of Irish neutrality.

== See also ==
- List of archaeological sites in County Cork
- Lists of mountains in Ireland
