= Rudolph Appel =

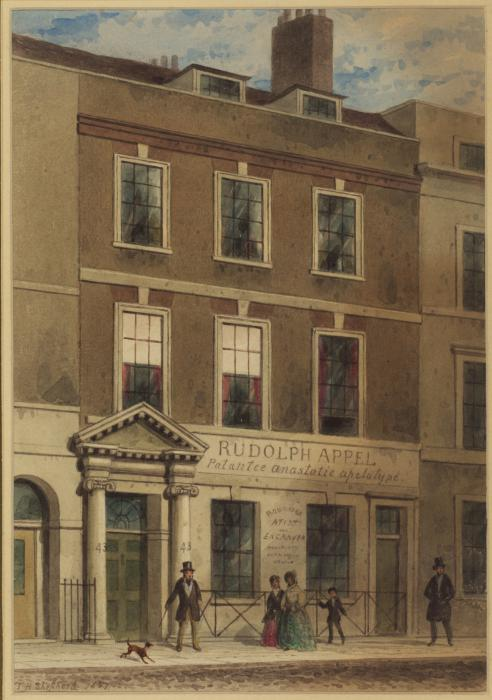
Rudolph Appel premises, 43 Gerrard Street

Rudolph Appel (1816 in Neisse – 1898 in Southampton) was a German printer and business man who played a major role in the development of anastatic lithography, a brand name that referred to already existing transfer lithography processes, and Photozincography in United Kingdom in the mid-nineteenth century.

After his business went bankrupt in 1858, he relinquished his anastatic lithography license to Samuel Cowell, and moved to Southampton where he was employed by the Ordnance Survey for the next thirty-five years.
