= Seán Ó Sé =

Irish tenor singer (1936–2026)

Seán Ó Sé (16 January 1936 – 13 January 2026) was an Irish tenor singer and schoolteacher from County Cork, who sang folk and traditional songs in Irish and English.

== Life and career ==
Seán Ó Sé was born in Ballylickey on 16 January 1936. He was educated at Coláiste Íosagáin, Ballyvourney and St Patrick's College, Dublin before working as a national school teacher in counties Wicklow and Cork, finishing his career as principal of St Mary's on the Hill in Knocknaheeny in Cork city.

He came to prominence as a singer in the 1960s with Seán Ó Riada's group Ceoltóirí Chualann. He later toured internationally with Comhaltas Ceoltóirí Éireann. Ó Sé is most associated with the comic song "An Poc ar Buile" ("the angry goat"), of which a version written in 1940 by Dónall Ó Mulláin of Cúil Aodha became a surprise hit single in 1962 when Ó Sé recorded it for Gael Linn. From this song is his nickname "the Pucker" or "An Pocar"; the latter used as the title of a 2013 biography broadcast on TG4.

Ó Sé died on 13 January 2026, at the age of 89.
