= Joseph Woods (engineer) =

English engineer and entrepreneur

Joseph Woods (1816 - 1849) was an English engineer and entrepreneur active in the middle of the nineteenth century. He worked closely with William Siemens when the later first came to England.

Woods was born in London in 1816, the son of Samuel Woods, a merchant.

In 1844 Joseph Woods registered the patent for anastatic lithography with the British Patent Office.

In 1847 he was a founding member of the Institution of Mechanical Engineers, being allocated membership number 56.
