= Ballylickey House =

Coordinates: 51°43′16.45″N 9°26′12.66″W

- Interactive map of Ballylickey House

Restaurant information
- Rating: Michelin Guide 1975
- Location: Ballylickey, County Cork, Ireland

Ballylickey House is a defunct restaurant in Ballylickey, County Cork, Ireland. It was a fine dining restaurant that was awarded one Michelin star in 1975. The Egon Ronay Guide awarded the restaurant one star during the 1975–1982 period.

The restaurant was part of Ballylickey Manor House. Although the building remains, the restaurant has closed down.

== See also ==
- List of Michelin starred restaurants in Ireland
