= Kilnaruane Pillar Stone =

- Cill na Rómhán (Irish)
- Bantry Pillar Stone, St. Brendan's Stone
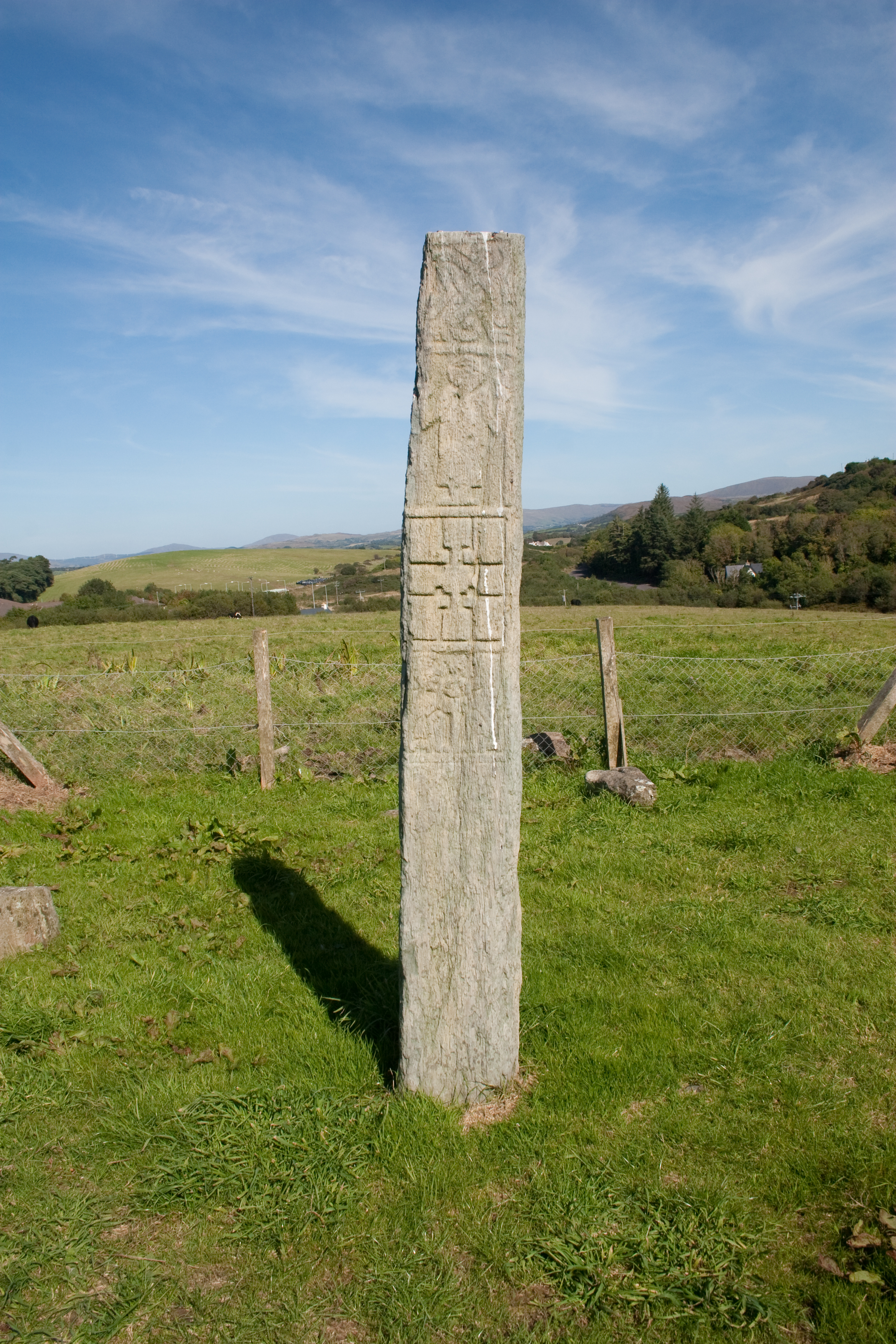
- View of northwest face

- Location within Ireland
- 51.671382°N 9.468068°W
- Type: high cross remnant
- Location: Kilnaruane, Bantry, County Cork, Ireland

History
- Built: 8th century AD

Site notes
- Height: 2.13 m (7 ft 0 in)

National monument of Ireland
- Official name: Kilnaruane/Bantry Pillar Stone
- Reference no.: 436

The Kilnaruane Pillar Stone is a carved monolith and National Monument located in County Cork, Ireland.

== Location ==
Kilnaruane Pillar Stone is located about 1.6 km (1 mile) southwest of Bantry, atop a drumlin, in a square enclosure in a field.

== History ==
A monastery may have been founded here by Brendan in the 6th century AD.

The pillar was erected in the 8th or 9th century AD. The name may refer to "Church of the Romans", and a community which accepted the Roman dating of Easter, a major controversy in the early Middle Ages.

The monastic settlement on the site may have been destroyed by a Viking attack.

== Description ==
The stone is a thin schist pillar 2.1 m tall.

On the northeast face:

- Celtic knot
- an orans (praying figure)
- Greek cross
- Saints Anthony the Great and Paul the Hermit meeting in the desert: both were important figures in Christian monasticism. A raven flies down from heaven with a loaf of bread to feed them

Skin-boat carved on the SW face.

On the southwest face

- Celtic knot
- Two pairs of sheep/goats with interlocked horns — this is now the symbol of the Sheep's Head peninsula
- a currach boat with four oarsmen and one figure steering the rowers through a sea of crosses. This could be Brendan or Cessair.

Mortises on either side of the pillar were probably for attaching arms of the cross. Nearby are stone fragments, possibly a bullaun or the arms of the high cross.

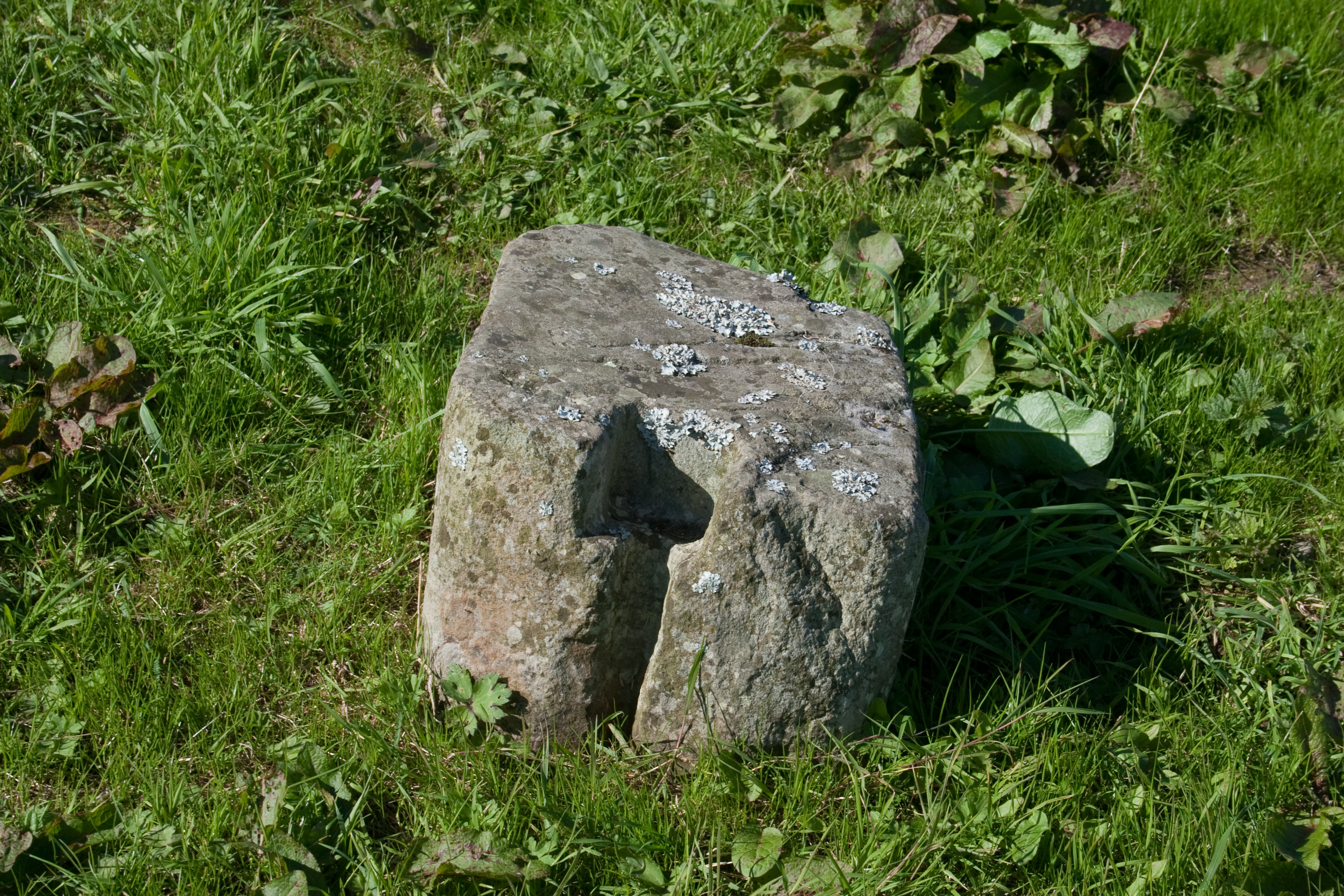
Arm of the cross?

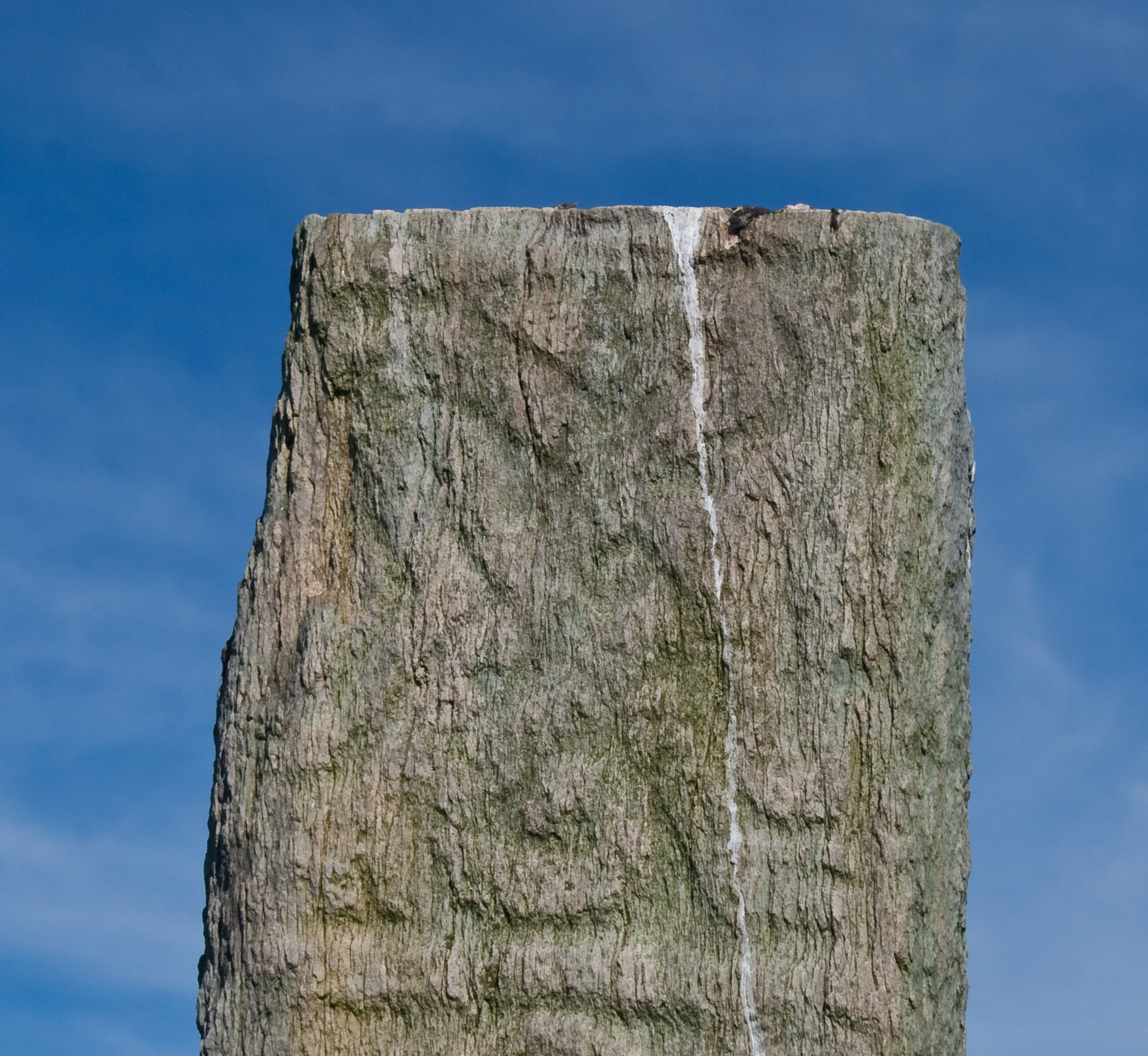
Celtic interlace

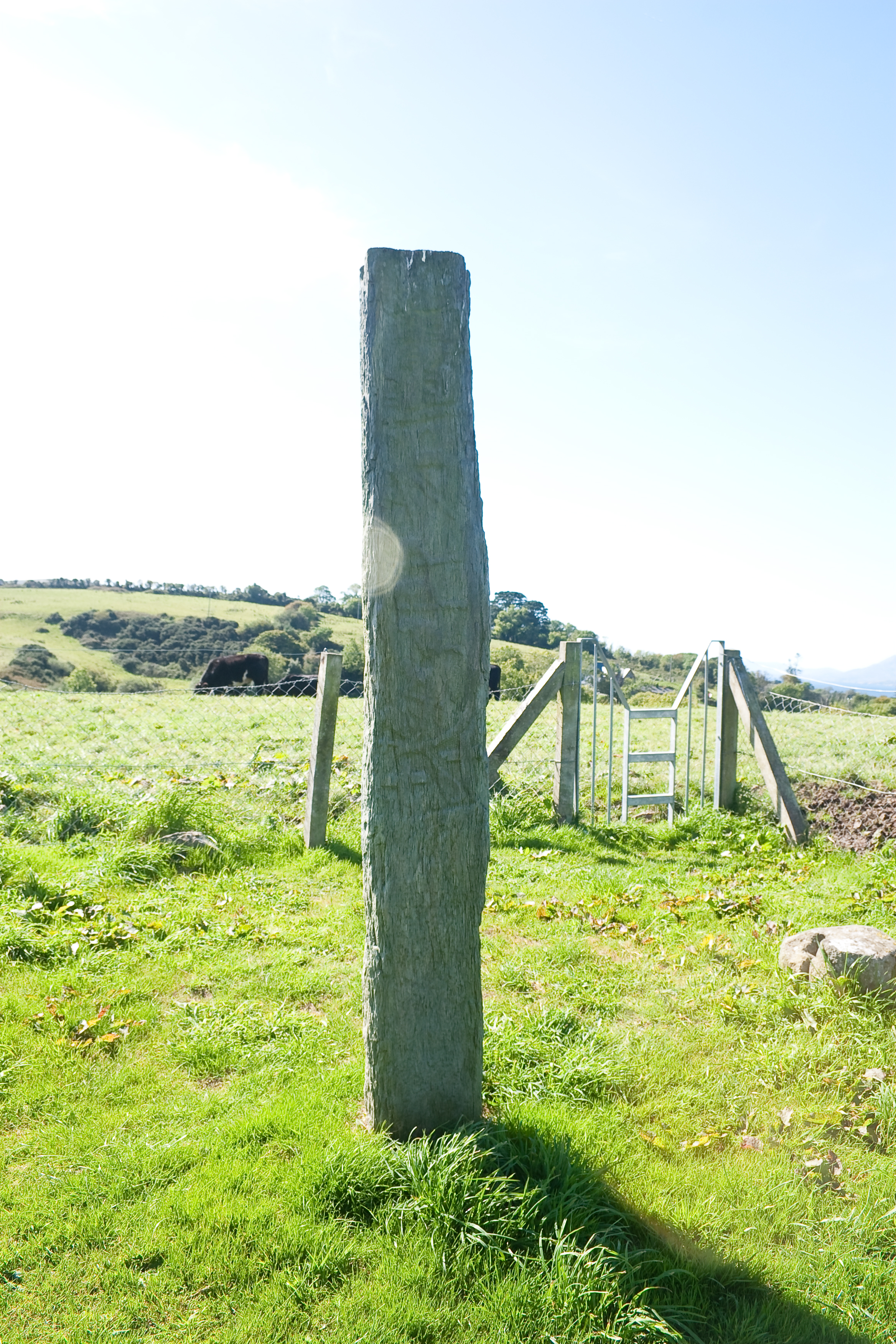
SE face
