= John T. Graves =

Irish jurist and mathematician (1806–1870)

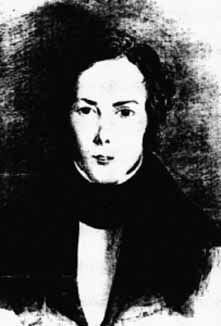
John T. Graves

John Thomas Graves (4 December 1806 – 29 March 1870) was an Irish jurist and mathematician. He was a friend of William Rowan Hamilton, and is credited both with inspiring Hamilton to discover the quaternions in October 1843 and then discovering their generalization the octonions himself (he called them octaves) later that same year. He was the brother of both the mathematician and bishop Charles Graves and the writer and clergyman Robert Perceval Graves.

== Life ==
Born in Dublin 4 December 1806, he was son of John Crosbie Graves, barrister, grandnephew of Richard Graves, D.D., and cousin of Robert James Graves, M.D. He was sent to school in England, in the parish of Westbury-on-Trym, then a village outside Bristol, under the Rev. Samuel Feild (Field in the Oxford Dictionary of National Biography), later vicar of Hatherleigh. Feild has been described as a "prominent second generation evangelical Anglican"; he was one of two curates in the parish, under Richard Carrow, the parish priest, as perpetual curate.

Graves was an undergraduate at Trinity College Dublin, where he distinguished himself in both science and classics, and was a class-fellow and friend of William Rowan Hamilton, graduating B.A. in 1827. He then moved to Oxford, where he became an incorporated member of Oriel College, 11 November 1830. Graves proceeded M.A. at Oxford in 1831, and at Dublin in 1832.

Having in 1830 entered the King's Inns, Dublin, Graves was called to the English bar in 1831, as a member of the Inner Temple. For a short time he went the Western circuit. In 1839 he was appointed professor of jurisprudence in London University College in a delayed succession to John Austin. Not long after, he was elected an examiner in laws in the University of London.

Graves was one of the committee of the Society for the Diffusion of Useful Knowledge. In 1839 he was elected as a Fellow of the Royal Society, and he subsequently sat on its council. He was also a member of the Philological Society and of the Royal Society of Literature. In 1846 Graves was appointed an assistant poor-law commissioner, and in the next year, under the new Poor Law Act, one of the poor-law inspectors of England and Wales.

in 1846 Graves married Amelia Tooke, a daughter of William Tooke, and died without issue on 29 March 1870 at Cheltenham.

== Mathematical work ==
In his twentieth year (1826) Graves engaged in researches on the exponential function and the complex logarithm; they were printed in the Philosophical Transactions for 1829 under the title An Attempt to Rectify the Inaccuracy of some Logarithmic Formulæ. Alexandre-Joseph-Hidulphe Vincent claimed to have arrived in 1825 at similar results, which, however, were not published by him till 1832. The conclusions announced by Graves were not at first accepted by George Peacock, who referred to them in his Report on Algebra, nor by Sir John Herschel. Graves communicated to the British Association in 1834 (Report for that year) on his discovery.

In the same report is a supporting paper by Hamilton, On Conjugate Functions or Algebraic Couples, as tending to illustrate generally the Doctrine of Imaginary Quantities, and as confirming the Results of Mr. Graves respecting the existence of Two independent Integers in the complete expression of an Imaginary Logarithm. It was an anticipation, as far as publication was concerned, of an extended memoir, which had been read by Hamilton before the Royal Irish Academy on 24 November 1833, On Conjugate Functions or Algebraic Couples, and subsequently published in the seventeenth volume of the Transactions of the Royal Irish Academy. To this memoir were prefixed A Preliminary and Elementary Essay on Algebra as the Science of Pure Time, and some General Introductory Remarks. In the concluding paragraphs of each of these three papers Hamilton acknowledges that it was "in reflecting on the important symbolical results of Mr. Graves respecting imaginary logarithms, and in attempting to explain to himself the theoretical meaning of those remarkable symbolisms", that he was conducted to "the theory of conjugate functions, which, leading on to a theory of triplets and sets of moments, steps, and numbers" were foundational for his own work, culminating in the discovery of quaternions.

For many years Graves and Hamilton maintained a correspondence on the interpretation of imaginaries. In 1843 Hamilton discovered the quaternions, and it was to Graves that he made on 17 October his first written communication of the discovery. In his preface to the Lectures on Quaternions and in a prefatory letter to a communication to the Philosophical Magazine for December 1844 are acknowledgments of his indebtedness to Graves for stimulus and suggestion. Immediately after the discovery of quaternions, before the end of 1843, Graves successfully extended to eight squares Euler's four-square identity, and went on to conceive a theory of "octaves" (now called octonions) analogous to Hamilton's theory of quaternions, introducing four imaginaries additional to Hamilton's i, j and k, and conforming to "the law of the modulus". Octonions are a contemporary if abstruse area of contemporary research of the Standard Model of particle physics. Shortly before the discovery, Graves wrote in a letter addressed to Hamilton on 26 October 1843, "If with your alchemy you can make three pounds of gold, why should you stop there?"

Graves devised also a pure-triplet system founded on the roots of positive unity, simultaneously with his brother Charles Graves, the bishop of Limerick. He afterwards stimulated Hamilton to the study of polyhedra, and was told of the discovery of the icosian calculus.

Graves contributed also to the Philosophical Magazine for April 1836 a paper On the lately proposed Logarithms of Unity in reply to Professor De Morgan, and in the London and Edinburgh Philosophical Magazine for the same year a "postscript" entitled Explanation of a Remarkable Paradox in the Calculus of Functions, noticed by Mr. Babbage. To the same periodical he contributed in September 1838 A New and General Solution of Cubic Equations; in 1839 a paper On the Functional Symmetry exhibited in the Notation of certain Geometrical Porisms, when they are stated merely with reference to the arrangement of points; and in April 1845 a paper on the Connection between the General Theory of Normal Couples and the Theory of Complete Quadratic Functions of Two Variables. A subsequent number contains a contribution On the Rev. J. G. MacVicar's Experiment on Vision, on the work of John Gibson Macvicar; and the Report of the Cheltenham meeting in 1856 of the British Association contains abstracts of papers communicated by him On the Polyhedron of Forces and On the Congruence nx ≡ n + 1 (mod. p.).

== Academic lawyer ==
The records of Graves's work as a jurist are twelve lectures on the law of nations, reported in the Law Times, commencing 25 April 1845, and two elaborate articles contributed to the Encyclopædia Metropolitana on Roman law and canon law. He was also a contributor to William Smith's Dictionary of Greek and Roman Biography and Mythology, with lives of the jurists Cato, Crassus, Drusus, Gaius, and an article on the legislation of Justinian.

== Collections ==
For many years Graves collected mathematical works. This portion of his library, more than ten thousand books and about five thousand pamphlets, was bequeathed to University College London (UCL) in 1870. The library, which is believed to be the largest collection of mathematical works in the UK, contains a first edition of Sir Issac Newton's Philosophiæ Naturalis Principia Mathematica.

UCL also holds notes for jurisprudence lectures given by Graves between 1839–1843 and documents relating to Graves' career.
