= Ida Margaret Graves Poore =

Autobiographer and poet

Ida Margaret Graves Poore Lady Poore
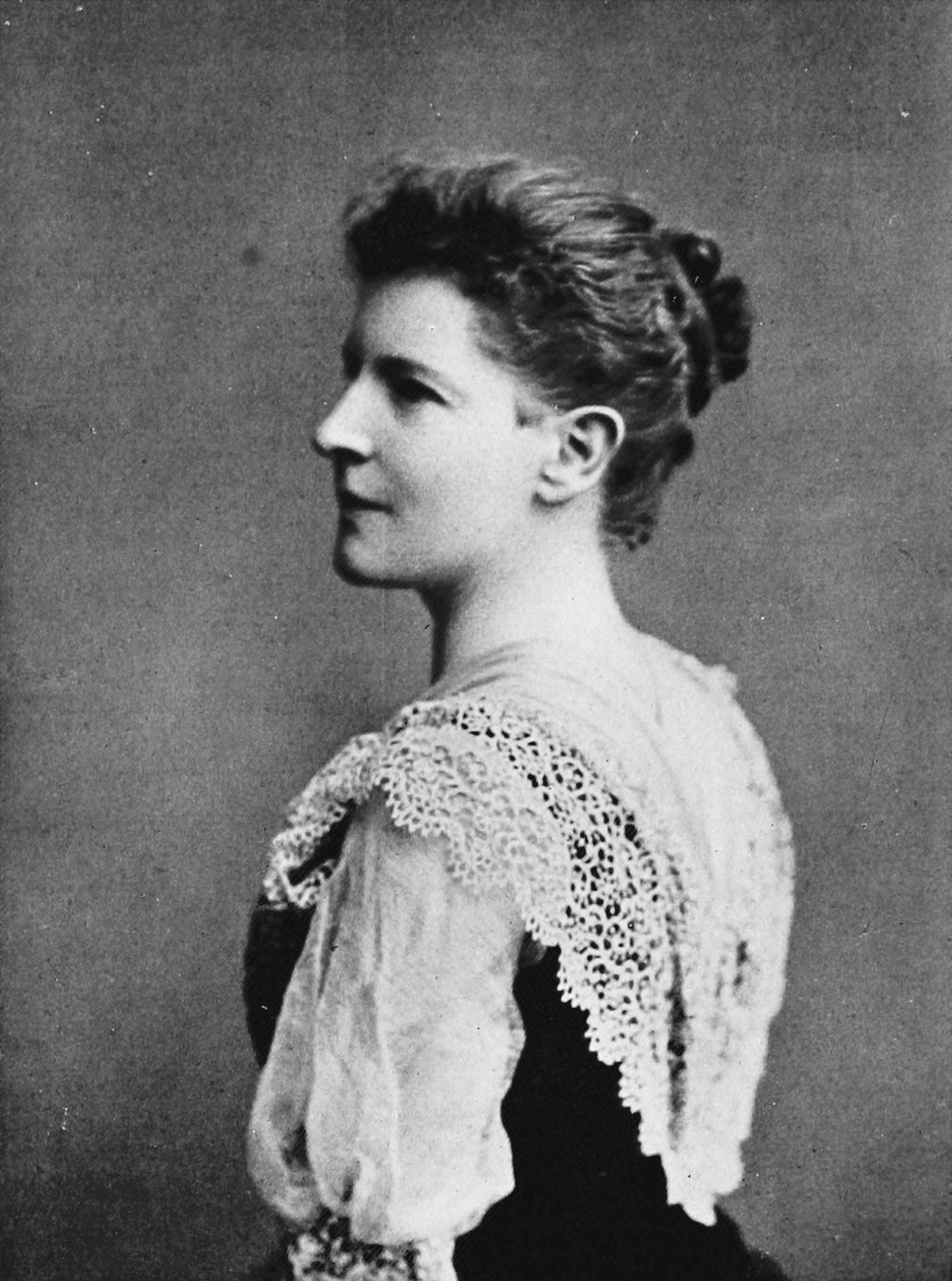
- Born: Ida Margaret Graves; 28 December 1859; Dublin
- Died: 5 February 1941 (aged 81); Switzerland
- Spouse: Sir Richard Poore, 4th Baronet
- Children: 1

Ida Margaret Graves Poore, Lady Poore (28 December 1859 – 5 February 1941), was an Anglo-Irish autobiographer and poet.

== Life and work ==
Born Ida Margaret Graves to Rt Rev Charles Graves and Selina Cheyne on 28 December 1859. Her father was Dean in the Chapel Royal in Dublin Castle and Poore grew up between there and their home in Parknasilla, Kerry until her father became Bishop of Limerick. Poore was sister of Alfred Perceval Graves, and aunt of poet Robert Graves. Poore was sent to a preparatory school for young ladies in Fulham, England. For her secondary level education she was first put under the care of a governess at home, which was then in Blarney, Cork. Poore was then sent to Fanny Metcalfe's school in Highfield where she was a classmate of Blanche Athena Clough. On her return to Kerry, Poore acted as her father's secretary in the aftermath of the Disestablishment of the Church of Ireland. There were also various guests of the family including Sheridan Le Fanu's brother William.

Due to her father's health at various times he travelled in Europe and Algeria and took her with him. She also travelled in Egypt which was where she met her future husband. Her biography gives a fascinating insight into the history of the countries where she and her family were living. She tells the story of the anti-catholic riots in Alexandria and the results of the shelling of the city by the British forces. Poore married Sir Richard Poore, 4th Baronet on 14 September 1885. They had one son, Roger. He followed his father into the Navy and was killed in action in 1915. Richard Poore rose to the position of Admiral in the Navy. Poore wrote two autobiographical books on life as a woman and as the wife of an admiral. She was known as Flag Mother to the sailors who worked with her husband. From 1908 to 1911 she and her husband were assigned to Sydney, Australia, where Lady Poore was the first president of the Bush Book Club and her good friend, Phoebe Ellen Wesché, was the vice-President.

She died on 5 February 1941 in Switzerland.

== Bibliography ==
- An admiral's wife in the making, 1860-1903, (1917)
- Recollections of an admirals̓ wife, 1903-1916, (1916)
