= Alfred Perceval Graves =

Anglo-Irish poet (1846–1931)

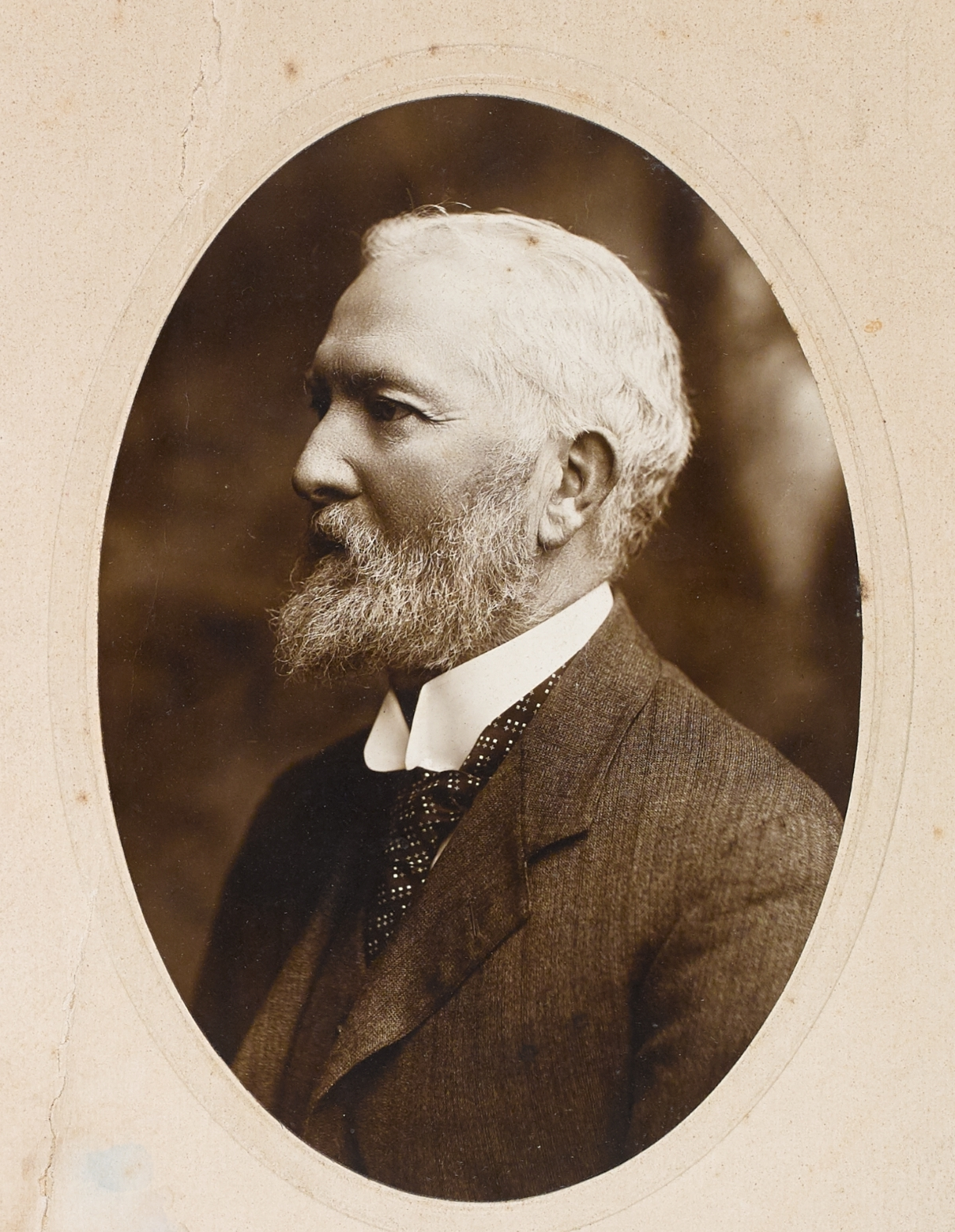
- Born: 22 July 1846; Dublin, Ireland
- Died: 27 December 1931 (aged 85); Harlech, Wales
- Occupations: Poet, songwriter, Her Majesty's Schools Inspector

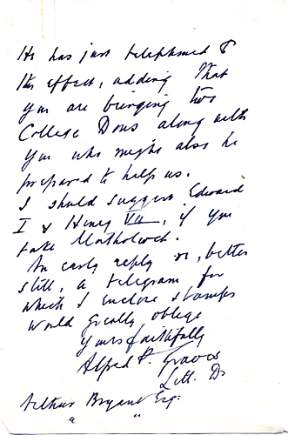
One page of a letter bearing Graves' signature

Alfred Perceval Graves (22 July 1846 – 27 December 1931), was an Anglo-Irish poet, songwriter and folklorist. He was the father of British poet and critic Robert Graves.

== Early life ==
Graves was born in Dublin and was the son of Charles Graves, the Anglican Bishop of Limerick, Ardfert and Aghadoe, and his wife Selina, the daughter of John Cheyne (1777–1836), the Physician-General to the British Forces in Ireland. His sister was Ida Margaret Graves Poore. His paternal grandmother Helena was a Perceval, and the granddaughter of an Earl of Egmont. His grandfather, John Crosbie Graves, was a first cousin of "Ireland's most celebrated surgeon", Robert James Graves.

Alfred was educated both in England, at Windermere College, Westmorland, and in Ireland, at Trinity College Dublin. As an undergraduate he contributed to the literary magazine Kottabos, starting in 1869.

His first poem appeared in the Dublin University Magazine in 1863. He graduated BA, later promoted to Master of Arts.

In 1869, he entered the Civil Service as clerk in the British Home Office, where he remained until he became an Inspector of Schools in 1874.

== Author ==
Graves was a contributor of prose and verse to The Spectator, Athenaeum, John Bull, and Punch.

He took a leading part in the late 19th-century renewal of Irish literature. He was for several years president of the Irish Literary Society, and he was the author of the comic song Father O'Flynn and many other songs and ballads. In collaboration with Charles Villiers Stanford, he published Songs of Old Ireland (1882) and Irish Songs and Ballads (1893), the airs of which are taken from the Petrie manuscripts; the airs of his Irish Folk-Songs (1897) were arranged by Charles Wood with whom he also collaborated on Songs of Erin (1901). Composer Mary Augusta Wakefield also set at least one of his poems to music.

He published an autobiography, To Return to All That, in 1930, as a response to his son Robert's World War I memoir, Good-Bye to All That.

== Later life ==
Graves built a large house, named "Erinfa", near Harlech, Wales, which he used as a summer retreat and where he spent his retirement. He had a keen interest in the Welsh language and the culture of Wales; he was elected as a Welsh bard in the National Eisteddfod of Wales at Bangor in 1902.

He died in Harlech in 1931.

== Legacy ==
Graves' obituary in The Spectator concluded: "Mr Graves not only wrote songs but stirred up fresh public interest in the old folk-songs of Ireland, Wales and the Highlands, and, moreover, induced musicians and singers to become interested too. Keeping clear of politics, he did a great work for the popularizing of good music and good poetry in which Celt and Saxon may share."

== Family ==
Graves' marriage to Jane Cooper, (29 December 1874 – 24 March 1886) of Cooper's Hill, County Limerick, resulted in five children:

- Philip Perceval (25 February 1876 – 3 June 1953), married Millicent Gilchrist
- Mary (6 June 1877 – 1949), married Arthur Sansome Preston
- Richard Massie (14 September 1880 – 14 August 1960), married Eva Wilkinson, 1912.
- Alfred Perceval ("Bones"), born 14 December 1881, married Eirene Gwen Knight, singer.
- Susan Winthrop Savatier Graves, born 23 March 1885, married Kenneth Macaulay.

After the death of his first wife, on 30 December 1891 Graves married secondly Amalie (Amy) Elizabeth Sophia von Ranke (born 1857), daughter of Heinrich Israel von Ranke and his wife Louise Antoinette Tiarks. They had five children:

- Clarissa, born 29 November 1892, poet, artist, and Christian Science practitioner
- Rosaleen-Louise (7 March 1894 – 3 August 1989), married James Francis Cooper
- Robert von Ranke Graves (24 July 1895 – 7 December 1985), poet, critic and author of I, Claudius, Good-Bye to All That and other novels
- Charles Patrick Ranke Graves (1899 – 1971), journalist and writer
- John Tiarks Ranke, (1903 – 1980), married Mary Wickens
