= Samuel Cowell =

Suffolk businessman (1801 - 1875)

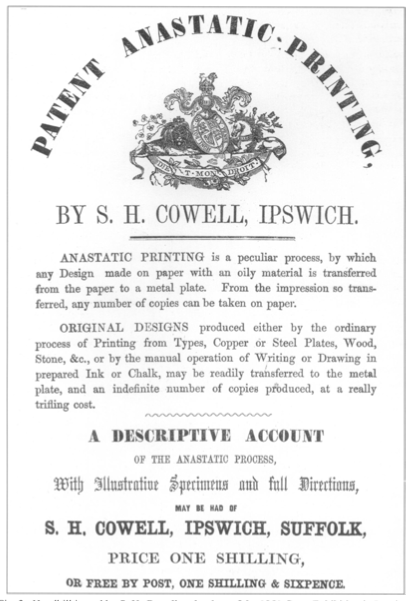
Handbill for Cowell's booklet

Samuel Harrison Cowell (24 May 1801, Ipswich-1875) was a Suffolk businessman who pioneered anastatic lithography in Ipswich. Cowell issued leaflets at the Great Exhibition in 1851 to advertise the new technology.

His son, William Samuel Cowell, joined the family printing business, inheriting it in 1875. In 1900 he turned the business into W. S. Cowell Ltd.
