= Anastatic lithography =

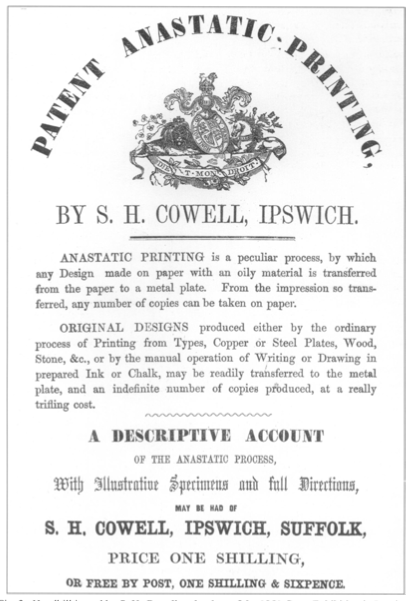
Advert for Samuel Cowell's pamphlet describing the process

Anastatic lithography is a method of printing developed by 1840 in Erfurt. The technique provided a means for facsimile reproduction, which was developed and promoted by Werner and William Siemens. The reproduction of the four pages of the 25 September 1841 issue of The Athenaeum, a London scientific and literary journal, was so true to the original that it caused concerns expressed in an article "Printing and Piracy–New Discovery" which was published in the issue No. 736 published December 4, 1841.

== Technique ==
Anastatic printing was a transfer process used to reproduce an existing printed sheet without access to the original type, plate, block, or stone. The process depended on the ability of old printing ink, especially fatty or oil-based ink, to be chemically treated so that it would again accept greasy ink and could be transferred to a lithographic surface.US 4239, Siemens, Werner; Siemens, William, "Improvement in anastatic printing", issued 17 October 1846

In one form of the technique, the printed original was dampened or charged with an acid solution. The face of the sheet was then inked, with the new ink adhering preferentially to the areas where the original printed ink was present. The inked image could then be transferred under pressure to a lithographic stone, zinc plate, or other prepared surface, where it was treated and used for printing. A later description of the process states that the back of the original was wetted with a solution of water, gum, and a small quantity of acid, after which the front was inked; the ink was taken up only in the places where the original had been printed, allowing the image to be transferred to stone, wood, or metal."Anastatic (printing-)". Polymetaal.

The method could be applied to letterpress pages, engravings, maps, and other printed images. Unlike ordinary lithographic transfer, which normally used a fresh impression made in special transfer ink, anastatic printing could work from an already printed copy. A disadvantage was that the chemical treatment and pressure often damaged or destroyed the original sheet, making the process unsuitable for valuable or unique copies.

== See also ==
- Bibliography of early American publishers and printers
