= List of Dublin Institute of Technology people =

This is a list of people associated with the Dublin Institute of Technology, including notable alumni and faculty members.

== Engineers ==
- Neville J Hogan, Emeritus Professor, Massachusetts Institute of Technology; awarded the Rufus Oldenburger Medal.

== Architects ==
- Sam Stephenson
- David Collins (interior designer)
- Arthur Gibney
- Des McMahon of Gilroy McMahon Architects
- John Meagher of De Blacam & Meagher Architects
- Angela Brady, Past President of Royal Institution of British Architects
- Deirdre O'Connor
- Graham Dwyer, convicted of the Murder of Elaine O'Hara

== Artists ==
- Robert Ballagh, artist, painter and designer
- Niall de Buitléar, artist
- Niall McCormack, painter
- Ramie Leahy, artist
- Duthain Dealbh group of sculptors Daniel Doyle, Niall Magee and Alan Magee,

== Authors ==
- Colum McCann, writer and Distinguished Professor of Creative Writing, Hunter College, New York City
- Arthur Mathews, writer
- Michael Nugent, writer and activist
- Brendan Behan, writer
- George O'Brien, writer and Professor of English, Georgetown University, Washington, D.C.
- Jimmy Murphy (playwright)
- Fergal O'Byrne, playwright
- Ronan Moore, writer

== Businesspeople ==
- Sean J. Conlon, US Real Estate Entrepreneur
- Alan Joyce (executive), Chief Executive Officer of Qantas
- Bobby Kerr (businessman), Hotelier and Cafe Entrepreneur
- Adrian Martin, chef and restaurateur
- Kevin McCourt (businessman) and later Director-General of RTÉ
- Brendan McDonagh, Managing Director of the National Asset Management Agency
- Martin Shanahan, CEO, IDA Ireland

== Politicians ==
- Bertie Ahern former Taoiseach
- Jim Mitchell former Minister for Justice and Deputy Leader of Fine Gael
- Mary Hanafin former Cabinet Minister
- Vincent Brady former Teachta Dála (TD) and former Minister of Defence
- Gay Mitchell MEP, former minister and 2011 Fine Gael presidential nominee
- Emmet Stagg Teachta Dála (TD) and Labour Party Chief Whip
- Simon Harris Teachta Dála (TD) and Taoiseach
- Regina Doherty Senator and former and Minister for Employment Affairs and Social Protection.
- Eric Byrne Teachta Dála (TD)
- Pearse Doherty Teachta Dála (TD)
- Dessie Ellis Teachta Dála (TD)
- Michael Creed Teachta Dála (TD) and Minister for Agriculture, Food and the Marine.
- Margaret Ekpo Nigerian woman's activist and politician
- Brendan Halligan economist and politician
- Jack Murphy former Teachta Dála (TD)
- Katharine Bulbulia former Senator and health advocate
- Noel Ahern former Teachta Dála (TD)
- Mary Wallace former Teachta Dála (TD)
- Eoin Ryan Jnr former Teachta Dála (TD) and MEP
- Tony Kett former Senator
- Seán Ryan former Teachta Dála (TD)
- Brendan Ryan Teachta Dála (TD)
- Ronan Moore Councillor
- Helene Conway-Mouret French Senator

== Diplomats ==
- Diarmuid O'Leary, Irish Ambassador to Luxembourg

David P Doyle, St. Kitts and Nevis Ambassador to UNESCO

== Journalists and broadcasters ==
- Geraldine Kennedy, former Editor, Irish Times
- Seamus Martin, former international editor, Irish Times
- Bryan Dobson, RTÉ Six One news presenter
- Carole Coleman, RTÉ News Washington correspondent
- Marian Finucane, RTÉ radio presenter
- George Hook, RTÉ rugby pundit and radio presenter
- Orla Guerin, BBC News correspondent
- Ray Kennedy, RTÉ news presenter and former Irish correspondent for Sky News
- Ray Foley, radio presenter
- Philip Reid (author), Sportswriter
- Colette Fitzpatrick, TV3 anchor
- Darren Kennedy, TV presenter, fashion writer and stylist
- Eoghan Corry, Travel writer
- Paddy Murray, newspaper editor and comedy writer
- Conor McAnally, US TV producer

== Sportspeople ==
- Paul McGinley, golfer, captained Europe in its 2014 Ryder Cup victory
- John Delaney, former CEO of the Football Association of Ireland
- Brian Kerr, former manager of Republic of Ireland national football team
- Stephen Roche, cycling
- Ronnie Dawson (rugby union)
- Aidan O'Shea, Darran O'Sullivan, Paul Flynn, Kevin McManamon, Darragh Ó Sé, Colin Walshe, Kevin McLoughlin, Mark Collins and Jason Doherty
- Kevin O'Reilly, Ollie Canning, Conor McCormack, David Treacy and Willie O'Dwyer, hurling
- Jane Dolan And Sarah Ryan (camogie)
- Becky Lynch, wrestler
- John Kavanagh, MMA trainer

== Musicians ==
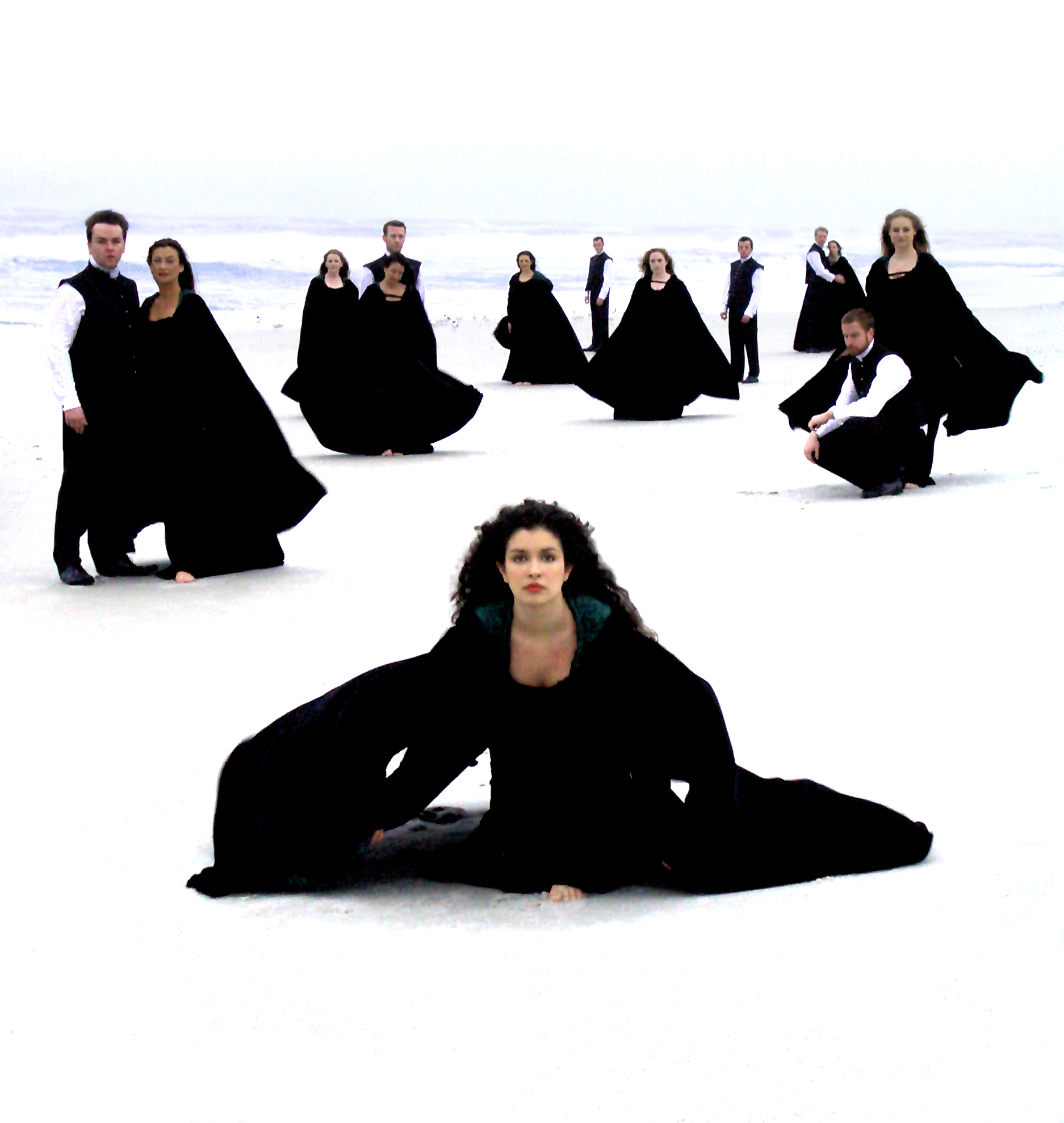
Anúna

- David Flynn, Composer
- The Boomtown Rats, Irish band formed by Bob Geldof
- Jimi Shields, Musician and Landscape Architect
- Larry Mullen, Jr., Drummer with U2
- Ciarán Farrell, Composer
- Ryan O'Shaughnessy, Singer and Songwriter
- Lynn Hilary and Deirdre Shannon, Singers, formerly of Anúna and Celtic Woman
- Aebh Kelly, soprano
- Eimear Quinn, soprano, popular singer formerly of Anúna

== Entertainers ==
- Domhnall Gleeson, actor, director, and writer
- John Moore (director), film director
- Nick Vincent Murphy, screenwriter
- Rouzbeh Rashidi, avant-garde filmmaker
- Shimmy Marcus, filmmaker
- Jack Nolan, actor
- Daryl McCormack, actor

== Fashion designers ==
- Louise Kennedy

== Chefs ==
- Stuart O'Keeffe, celebrity chef and US television personality
- Richard Corrigan chef
- Darina Allen, Irish chef, food writer, TV personality
- Kevin Dundon, chef

== Others ==
- Christine Loscher, professor of Biotechnology
