= Phil Reid =

Phil(l)(ip) Reid, Read or Reed may refer to:

== Film and TV personalities ==
- Phillip Reed (1908–1996), American actor; a/k/a Philip Reed and Phil Reed
- Philip Reid, Australian film and TV editor since 1964; a/k/a Phil Reid (Last Dance (2012 film))
- Phil Reid, Welsh actor in 2002 BBC Wales TV series First Degree#Cast

== Politicians ==
- Philip Reed (politician) (1760–1829), American senator and congressman from Maryland
- Phil Reed (1949–2008), American member of New York City Council

== Sportspeople ==
- Phil Read (1939–2022), English motorcycle racer
- Phil Reid (born 1952), American high school golfing champion (Gary Koch#Early years)
- Phil Reid, South Australian chairman of South Adelaide Panthers FC since 1997
- Philip Reid (sportswriter) (born 1961), Irish journalist with The Irish Times
- Phillip Read (born 1979), Australian rules footballer

== Others ==
- Philip Reed (sculptor) (c.1820–1892), also spelled Philip Reid, African American craftsman in Washington, D.C.
- Philip D. Reed (1899–1989), American CEO and president of General Electric
- Phil Reid, British squadron leader in 2008 (RAF Bentley Priory#The final days of RAF occupation)
- Philip Reed (game designer) (born 1972), American founder of Ronin Arts
- Philip Reed (model ship maker), model ship maker

== See also ==
- Philip Reade, pseudonym of unidentified American 1890s dime novel author (Thomas Edison in popular culture#Characters based on Edison)
