= Brendan McDonagh =

Irish civil servant

Brendan McDonagh is the chief executive officer of the National Asset Management Agency in the Republic of Ireland. He was appointed to the position on 5 May 2009 by Brian Lenihan, Ireland's minister of finance.

== Career ==
Prior to his appointment Brendan McDonagh was Director Finance, Technology & Risk with the National Treasury Management Agency (NTMA). He held that post since 2002. Prior to that, he was Financial Controller (1998–2002) of the NTMA. He joined the NTMA in 1994.

Previously he worked for a number of years with the Electricity Supply Board of Ireland (ESB) in a number of areas including accounting, internal audit and treasury. During his time in the ESB, he worked on secondment from the ESB to the NTMA in its initial years.

== Education ==
Brendan McDonagh was born in Killorglin, County Kerry, Ireland. McDonagh, 41 years old at the time of his appointment, holds a Bachelor of Science Degree in Business Management from Dublin Institute of Technology and is also a Chartered Management Accountant.
