= TU Dublin School of Culinary Arts and Food Technology =

Coordinates: 53.352182°N 6.259542°W

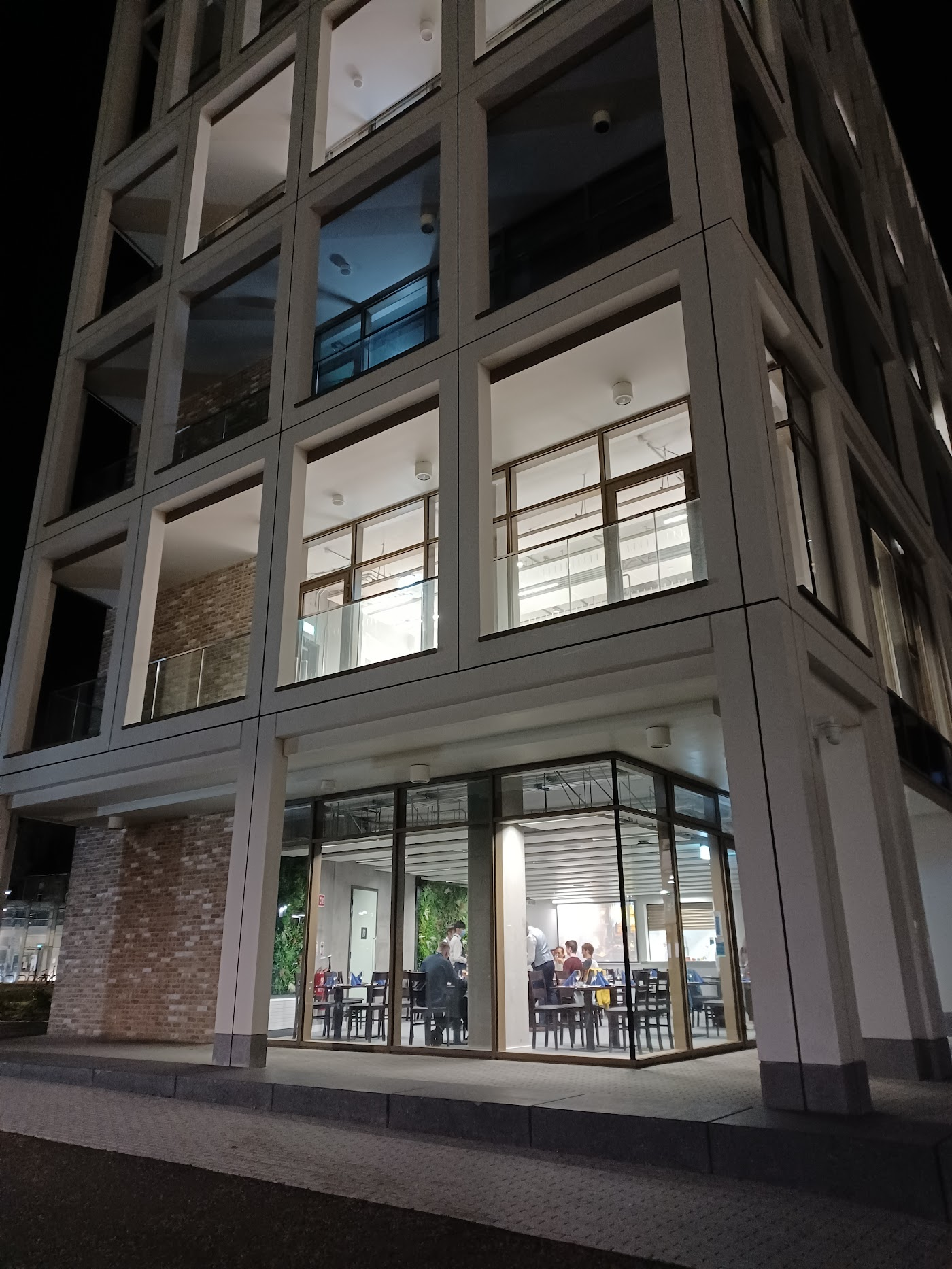
The School of Culinary Arts and Food Technology runs two training restaurants in the Central Quad building on Grangegorman campus.

The TU Dublin School of Culinary Arts and Food Technology (formerly DIT School of Culinary Arts and Food Technology) is a part of the Technological University Dublin (formerly Dublin Institute of Technology).

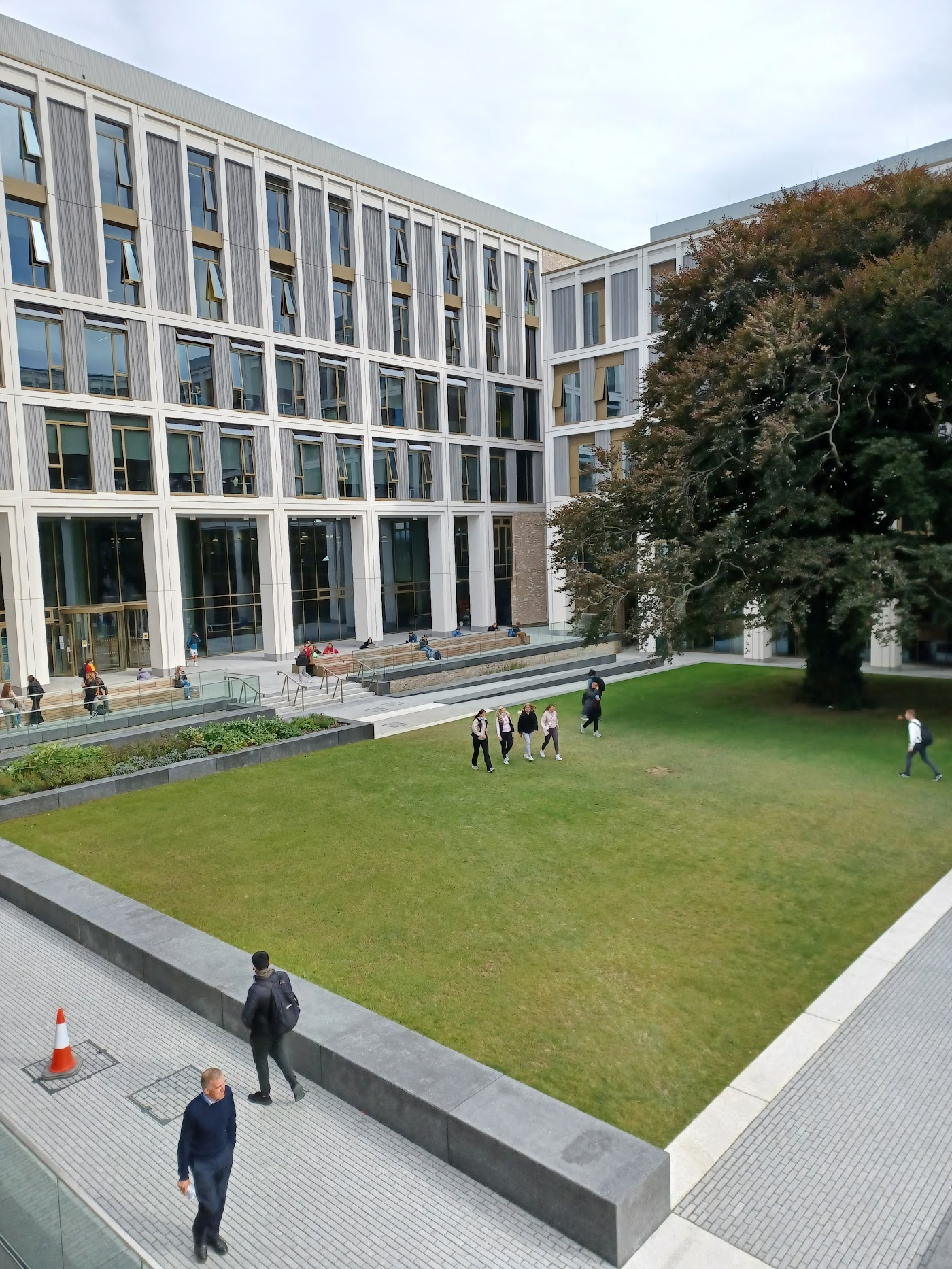
The Central Quad building on the Grangegorman campus of TU Dublin houses the School of Culinary Arts and Food Technology, among other university institutes.

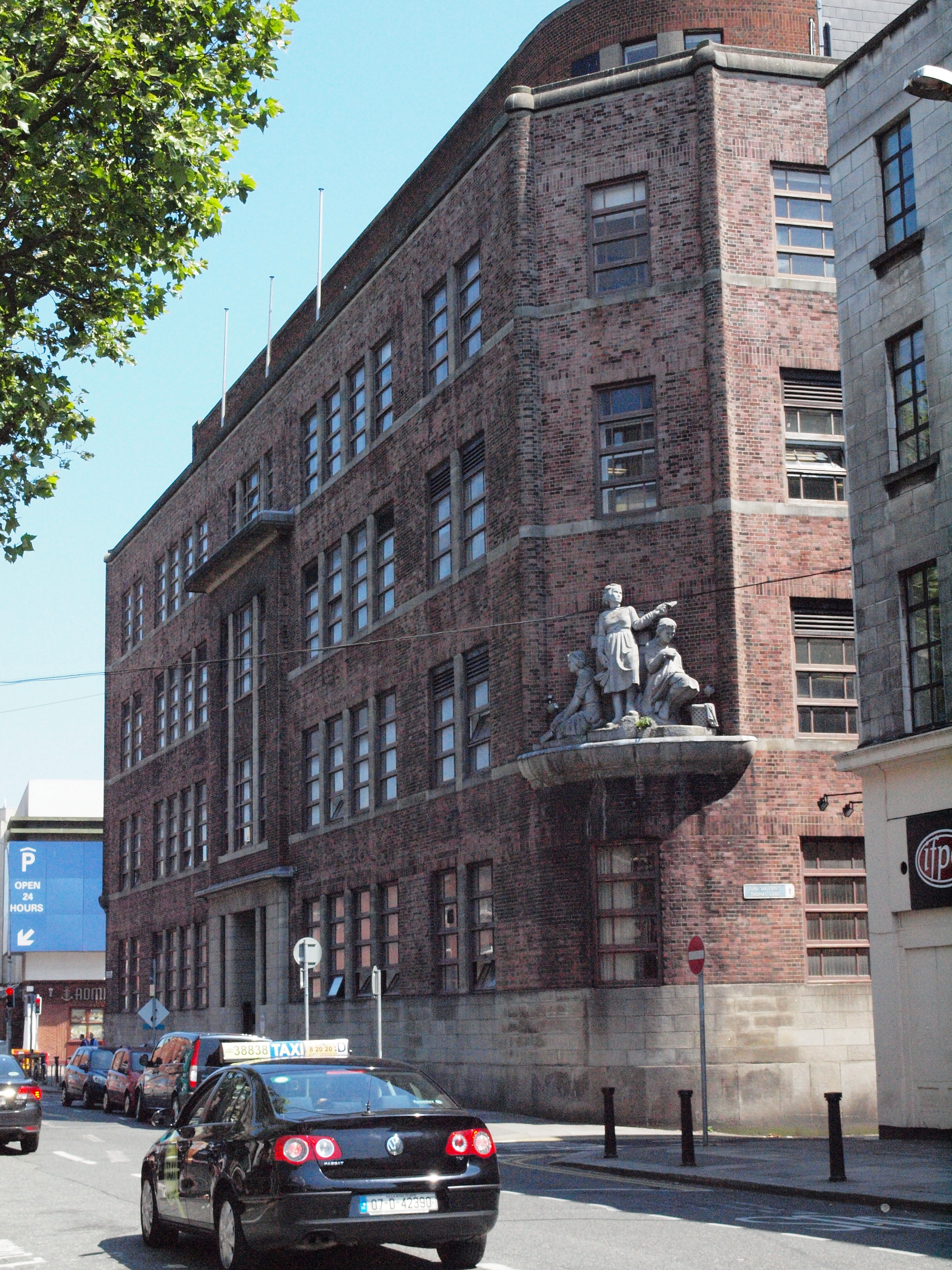
The building in Cathal Brugha Street which housed the School from 1941–2021.

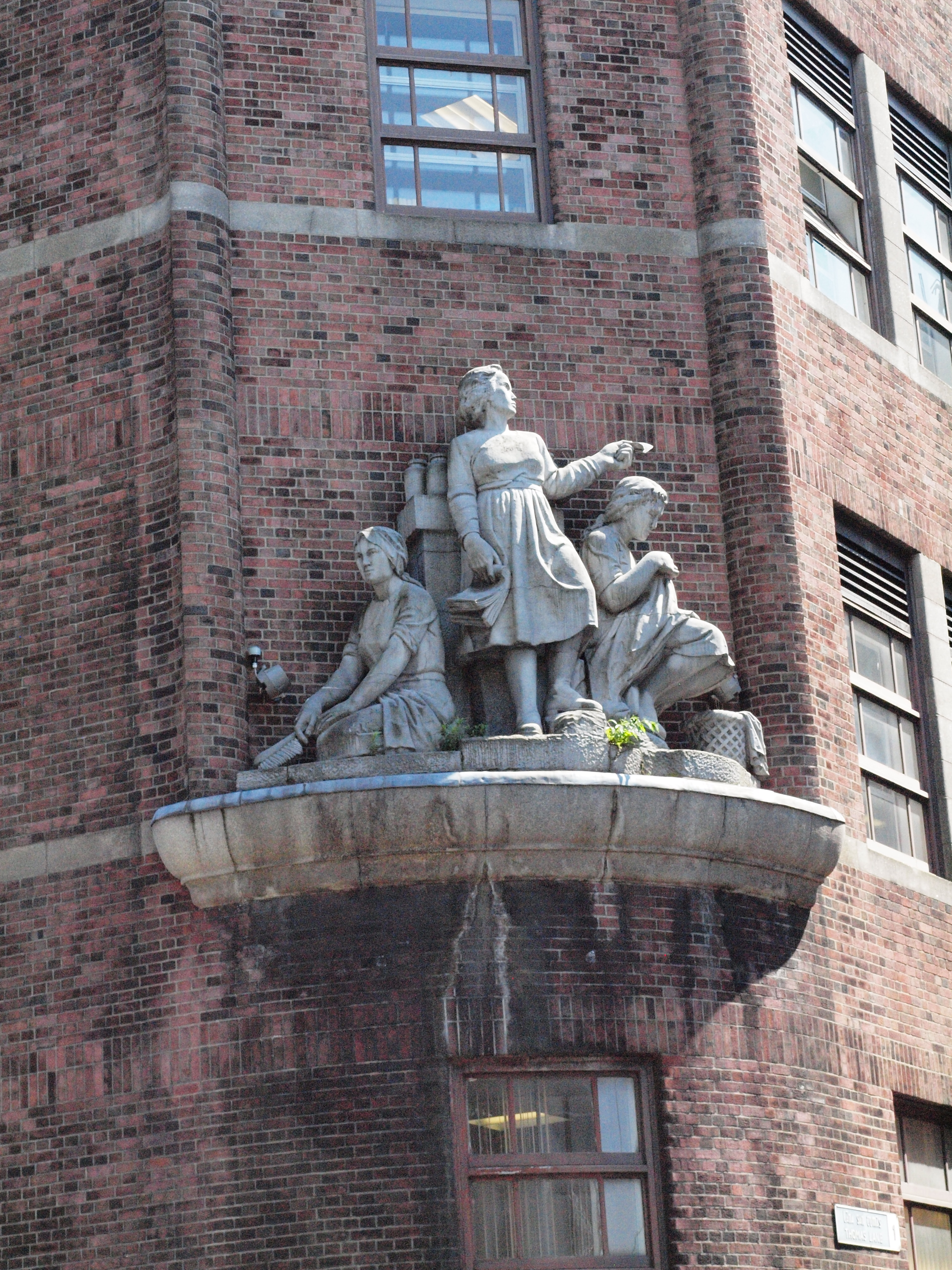
Statue detail

== History ==
Originally opened as Saint Mary's College of Domestic Science in Cathal Brugha Street in 1941, it became the Dublin College of Catering in the 1950s. The Faculty of Tourism and Food was founded in 1977. In 1999, the School became the first culinary college to offer a Bachelor's Degree in Culinary Arts. The School sits within the Faculty of Tourism and Food.

When the Dublin Institute of Technology merged with IT Tallaght and IT Blanchardstown on 1 January 2019 to become Ireland's first Technological University, the School of Culinary Arts and Food Technology became part of the TU Dublin City Campus. In 2021, the School moved to the new Grangegorman Campus, where it operates a number of kitchens, bakeries, sensory labs, as well as two restaurants and a retail outlet.

== Academics ==
The TU Dublin School of Culinary Arts and Food Technology, based on the TU Dublin Grangegorman campus, Central Quad, provides education, training and research for the culinary, food, beverage and hospitality industries.

The School offers programmes from Level 6 Higher Certificate up to Level 10 PhD on the Irish National Framework of Qualifications. Undergraduate programmes and disciplines include Culinary Arts, Culinary Entrepreneurship, Culinary Science, Baking and Pastry Arts Management, Bar and Restaurant Management, and Food Management and Entrepreneurship. Postgraduate programmes currently offered are an MSc in Culinary Innovation and Food Product Development, MA in Gastronomy and Food Studies, and a PG Diploma in Global Food and Drink Leadership.

In 2009, Máirtín Mac Con Iomaire became the first Irish chef to earn a PhD at the School, with a dissertation entitled 'The Emergence, Development and Influence of French Haute Cuisine on Public Dining in Dublin Restaurants 1900–2000: An Oral History'. Since then, a dozen PhD researchers have graduated from the School, while a further fourteen are pursuing PhD research as of late 2021 in areas as diverse as wine and food writing, historic whiskey mash bills, culinary education and emotion in food product design.

As part of its academic and practical training offers, the School runs two training restaurants, the Musgrave Marketplace Restaurant and the Ballymaguire Foods Restaurant. Both are working classrooms designed as a restaurant setting, in which the students prepare and serve food and drink to paying customers. The training restaurants have long been a feature of the School, dating back to the Cathal Brugha Street location. They are on principle open to the public; however, they are a classroom environment, and the primary objective is to facilitate student learning. The School also operates a Culinary Shop in the Central Quad building that sells baked goods, pastries, cookies and confectionary items produced by the students on site to the public, students, and staff on campus at a reduced price. Opening hours vary according to production levels.
