= DIT Faculty of Tourism and Food =

College of Arts and Tourism, Dublin Institute of Technology
- Institiúid Teicneolaíochta Bhaile Atha Cliath
- Active: 1992–2021
- Location: Dublin, Ireland
- Website: dit.ie/colleges/collegeofartstourism

The Faculty of Tourism and Food of the Dublin Institute of Technology (DIT) was a culinary school located at Cathal Brugha Street in Dublin.

== History ==
Originally opened as the College of Catering in 1941, the Faculty of Tourism and Food was founded in 1992.

The faculty specialised in training professional chefs, hospitality managers, and other professionals in the food and tourism industry, providing undergraduate degrees as well as master's degrees and doctorates.

Its graduates included Darina Allen, TV chef, food writer, and founder of the Michelin starred Ballymaloe House and Cookery School and food company, among other Irish chefs and hoteliers.

In a restructuring of the faculty in 2009, the School of Hospitality Management and Tourism and the School of Culinary Arts were merged with the former Faculty of Applied Arts into the new College of Arts and Tourism. The School of Food Science and Environmental Health was transferred to the new College of Science.

In 2019, as a result of the Dublin Institute of Technology merging with IT Tallaght and IT Blanchardstown in early 2019, the school closed and its elements moved to a new campus in 2021.

== Schools ==
The former Faculty of Tourism and Food consisted of the following schools:

- School of Hospitality Management and Tourism
- School of Food Science and Environmental Health
- School of Culinary Arts and Food Technology
