= Máirtín Mac Con Iomaire =

Irish lecturer and professional chef

Máirtín Mac Con Iomaire is an Irish lecturer and professional chef. He was awarded Ireland's first PhD on food history, in October 2009.

== Life ==
A native of Blackrock, County Dublin, he attended Coláiste Eoin secondary school in Stillorgan finishing his Leaving Cert in 1986. He went on to UCD where he spent one academic year. In that time, Mac Con Iomaire was a keen member of UCD Boxing club. In his college summers, he worked on Cape Cod in the famous Kennedy Compound.

== Education ==
Mac Con Iomaire trained at Dublin Institute of Technology, Cathal Brugha Street. From there, he began working in Dublin restaurants specialising in haute cuisine. He was the first Irish chef to earn a PhD for his Oral History of Dublin Restaurants 1900–2000 titled 'The Emergence, Development and Influence of French Haute Cuisine on Public Dining in Dublin Restaurants 1900–2000: An Oral History'.

== Career ==
Mac Con Iomaire is well known as an award-winning chef, culinary historian, food writer, broadcaster and ballad singer. A native Irish speaker, he has presented two six-part series of cookery programmes 'Aingeal sa Chistin' for TG4, and has featured on numerous other food-related radio and television programmes for RTÉ, TV3, Radio na Gaeltachta, and Canvas TV (Belgium).

Since 1999 he is a lecturer at the School of Culinary Arts and Food Technology, Technological University Dublin (formerly Dublin Institute of Technology), where he now chairs the first MA in Gastronomy and Food Studies in Ireland. Along with his Ph.D. candidates, Mac Con Iomaire is building a research cluster around Ireland’s culinary past and heritage.

In 2012 he chaired the inaugural Dublin Gastronomy Symposium in the School of Culinary Arts and Food Technology, DIT, Cathal Brugha Street, bringing together a hundred food lovers to discuss all things food. A total of 30 papers were delivered by Irish and International speakers.

Together with Dr Dorothy Cashman (independent scholar) and Dr Michelle Share (Trinity College Dublin), he is co-founder and editor of the European Journal of Food, Drink, and Society. The journal aims to stimulate debate and progress research on the study of food and drink at global and local levels.The first edition of the journal was published in early 2021.

In December 2021, the Irish Research Council awarded Dr Máirtín Mac Con Iomaire a Research Ally Prize as part of the IRC Researcher of the Year 2021 awards. This new national award category, the Research Ally Prizes celebrate the role of supervisors, mentors, and research officers in supporting and sustaining the Irish research community, and how they help to foster a positive academic culture based on equality, inclusivity, and respect.

== Oxford ==
Mac Con Iomaire is a regular contributor at the Oxford Symposium on Food and Cookery and in 2010 designed and produced the Gala Irish Banquet along with Pádraig Óg Gallagher, Pauline Danaher, and Dave Power for over two hundred of the world's leading chefs, food writers, culinary historians, academics, scientists, and general foodies.

== Publications ==
=== Books ===
- Mac Con Iomaire, M. and Maher, E., eds. (2014). Tickling the Palate: Gastronomy in Irish Literature and Culture. Oxford: Peter Lang. ISBN 978-3034317696

=== Articles ===
- Mac Con Iomaire, M. (2018). 'Recognizing food as part of Ireland’s intangible cultural heritage'. Folk Life, 56 (2), pp. 93–115. DOI: 10.1080/04308778.2018.1502402
- Healy, J.J. and Máírtín Mac Con Iomaire, M. (2018). 'Calculating restaurant failure rates using longitudinal census data'. Journal of Culinary Science & Technology. DOI: 10.1080/15428052.2018.1459999
- Keating, M. and Mac Con Iomaire, M. (2018). 'Tradition and novelty: food representations in Irish Women’s magazines 1922–73'. Food, Culture & Society 21 (4), pp. 488–504. DOI: 10.1080/15528014.2018.1480642
- Allen, H. and Mac Con Iomaire, M. (2017). 'Secrets of a Head Chef: Exploring Factors Influencing Success in Irish Kitchens'. Journal of Culinary Science & Technology 15 (3), pp. 187–222. DOI: 10.1080/15428052.2016.1225538
- Mac Con Iomaire, M. (2016). 'Food on the Edge: The future of food is a sustainable future'. Research in Hospitality Management, 6 (1), pp. 107–111. DOI: 10.2989/RHM.2016.6.1.15.1303
- Allen, H. and Mac Con Iomaire, M. (2016). '"Against all odds”: Head chefs profiled'. Journal of Culinary Science & Technology 14 (2), pp. 107–135. DOI: 10.1080/15428052.2015.1080645
- Mac Con Iomaire, M. (2011). 'The Changing Geography and Fortunes of Dublin's Haute Cuisine Restaurants, 1958–2008'. Food, Culture & Society 14 (4), pp. 525–545, DOI: 10.2752/175174411X13088262162631
- Mac Con Iomaire, M. and Óg Gallagher, P. (2011). 'Irish Corned Beef: A Culinary History'. Journal of Culinary Science & Technology 9 (1), pp. 27–43, DOI: 10.1080/15428052.2011.558464
- Mac Con Iomaire, M. and Óg Gallagher, P. (2009). 'The Potato in Irish Cuisine and Culture'. Journal of Culinary Science & Technology 7 (2-3), pp. 152–167. DOI: 10.1080/15428050903313457
- Mac Con Iomaire, M. (2008). 'Understanding the Heat—Mentoring: A Model for Nurturing Culinary Talent'. Journal of Culinary Science & Technology, 6 (1), pp. 43–62. DOI: 10.1080/15428050701884196

== Sports ==
Mac Con Iomaire is also a keen sportsman and coach of juvenile camogie and ladies' football teams at the Na Fianna GAA club in Glasnevin where his daughters play.
