= Aebh Kelly =

Irish mezzo-soprano (born 1997)

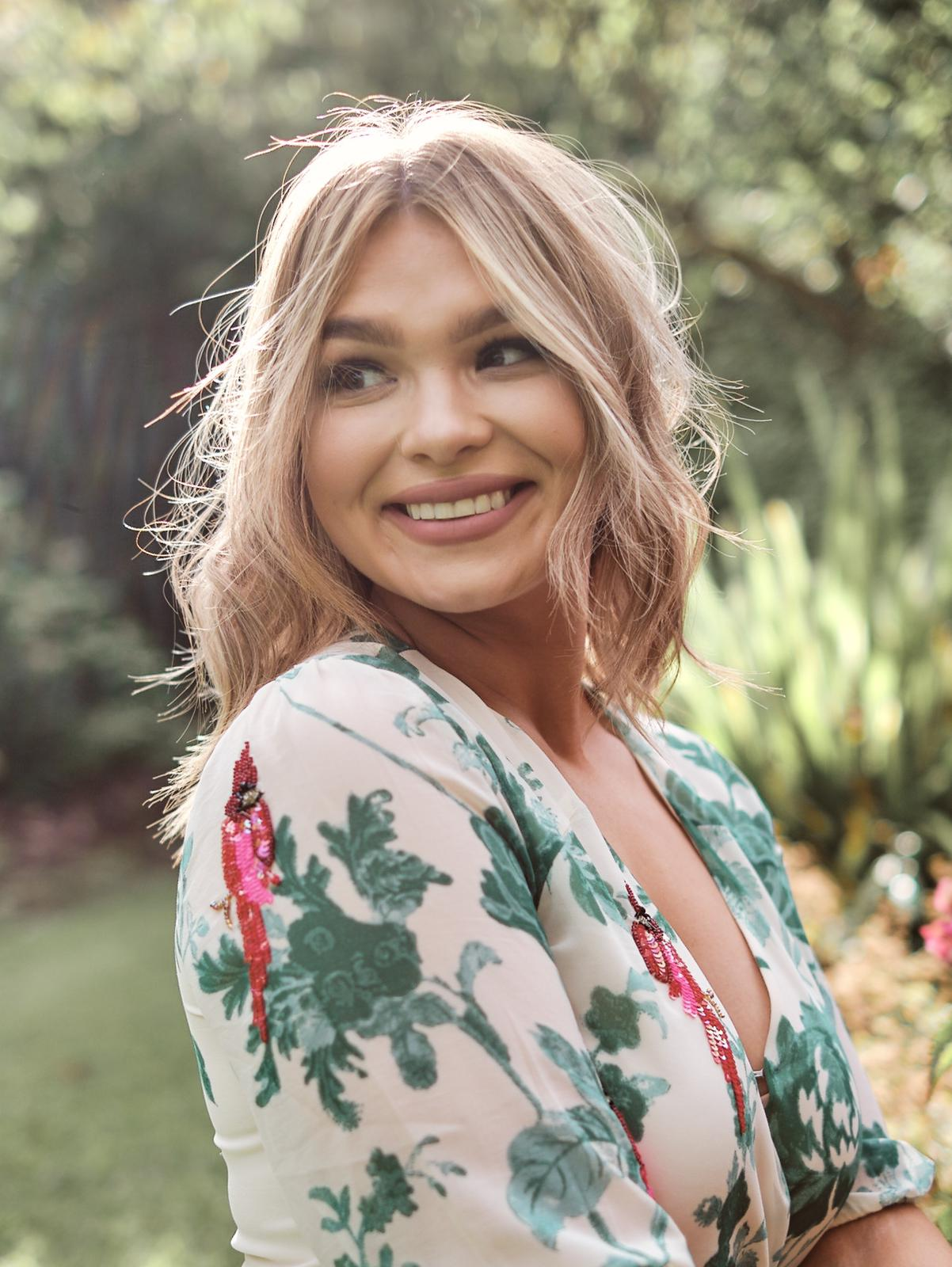

Background information
- Born: Skerries, County Dublin, Ireland
- Genres: Classical
- Instrument: Vocals
- Website: aebhkelly.com

Aebh Kelly is an Irish mezzo-soprano singer based at Mascarade Opera in Florence, Italy as a Maria Manetti Shrem Artist.

Kelly completed her bachelor's degree in music performance at the Royal Irish Academy of Music in 2020 and continued her studies there on a mentorship programme under the direction of Virginia Kerr and Dearbhla Collins.

In 2020–21, Kelly was an ABL Aviation Opera Studio member with Irish National Opera where she performed in their 20 Shots of Opera, La Boheme, and A Thing I Cannot Name productions.

== Performances ==
- 2021 – Collaboration with the Mascarade Opera studio for the Celebration of the Queen's Platinum Jubilee.
- 2023 – Eugene Onegin with Theater und Orchester Heidelberg in Germany
