= Irish Exchequer =

Irish Exchequer may refer to:

- Exchequer of Ireland, 1210–1817
- Court of Exchequer (Ireland), c.1300–1877
  - Exchequer Division of the High Court of Justice in Ireland, 1877 to 1897
- Central Fund (Ireland), since 1922
