= Central Fund (Ireland) =

State account at the Central Bank

The Central Fund (Irish: Príomh-Chiste) is the main accounting fund used by the government of Ireland. It is a bank account held at the Central Bank of Ireland, managed by the Minister for Finance as head of the Department of Finance. It is informally called the exchequer (an Státchiste) by analogy with the UK Exchequer.

== Statutory basis ==
The Constitution of Ireland (1937) states:

All revenues of the State from whatever source arising shall, subject to such exception as may be provided by law, form one fund, and shall be appropriated for the purposes and in the manner and subject to the charges and liabilities determined and imposed by law.

The previous (1922) constitution had a similar provision, and an ancillary statute named the fund "The Central Fund of Saorstát Eireann" and replaced "Consolidated Fund" accordingly in UK laws retained by Saorstát Eireann (the Irish Free State). The fund was renamed "the Central Fund" when the 1937 constitution renamed the state "Ireland". A new Central Fund Act was passed annually in March between 1923 and 1965, to authorise the Minister for Finance to issue money from the Central Fund in accordance with budget estimates until the Finance Act and Appropriations Act were finalised in July to handle the rest of the financial year. The Central Fund (Permanent Provisions) Act 1965 gave permanent authority to the minister, obviating the need for annual Central Fund Acts.

The Department of Public Expenditure and Reform (named the Department of Public Expenditure, Infrastructure, Public Service Reform and Digitalisation since 2025) was separated from the Department of Finance in 2011, both to split the finance portfolio between a minister from each party in the Fine Gael–Labour coalition, and to facilitate implementation of austerity measures in response to the post-2008 downturn. The Minister for Public Expenditure, Infrastructure, Public Service Reform and Digitalisation has no direct access to the Central Fund; rather, the minister formulates spending policy and directs the Minister for Finance to allocate monies from the Central Fund accordingly. In the 2017–2020 government, Paschal Donohoe held both portfolios, making the distinction less relevant. Since 2020, the portfolios have been held by ministers of different parties.

== Other funds ==
Non-exchequer government funds include:

Social Insurance Fund
Pay Related Social Insurance contributions for distribution by the Department of Social Protection. The fund, comprising a transaction account and an investment account, was created in 1953, initially from four earlier funds. (Note: The funds were: Funds established in 1923 as Free State components of the corresponding UK funds: National Health Insurance Fund; Unemployment Fund; Insurance Fund of the Incorporated Insurance Industry Unemployment Insurance Board; Widows' and Orphans' Pensions Fund (1935))
National Training Fund
established in 2000 for further education
Ireland Strategic Investment Fund
a sovereign wealth fund established in 2014 and administered by the National Treasury Management Agency. It replaced the National Pensions Reserve Fund, a pension fund for state and public-sector pensions established in 2001.
National Surplus (Exceptional Contingencies) Reserve Fund
a rainy day fund established in 2019.

Local government authorities also have funds.

== See also ==
- Consolidated Fund, equivalent in the United Kingdom
- Irish Exchequer (disambiguation)
