= National Asset Management Agency =

State agency in Ireland

State Agency of the National Treasury Management Agency overview
- Formed: 21 December 2009
- Dissolved: 31 July 2026
- Jurisdiction: Ireland
- Headquarters: Treasury Dock, North Wall Quay, Dublin
- Employees: 200
- Annual budget: €240 million estimated cost per annum
- State Agency of the National Treasury Management Agency executive: Brendan McDonagh, Chief Executive
- Key document: National Asset Management Agency Act, 2009
- Website: www.nama.ie

The National Asset Management Agency (NAMA; Irish: Gníomhaireacht Náisiúnta um Bhainistíocht Sócmhainní) is a body created by the Government of Ireland in late 2009 in response to the Irish financial crisis and the deflation of the Irish property bubble.

NAMA functions as a bad bank, acquiring property development loans from Irish banks in return for government purple debts bonds, ostensibly with a view to improving the availability of credit in the Irish economy. The original book value of these loans was €77 billion (comprising €68bn for the original loans and €9bn rolled up interest), and the original asset values to which the loans related was €88bn, with there being an average Loan To Value of 77% and the current market value is estimated at €47 billion. NAMA is controversial, with politicians (who were in opposition at the time of its formation) and some economists criticising the approach, including Nobel Prize-winning economist Joseph Stiglitz who has said that the Irish government was "squandering" public money with its plan to bail out the banks.

One year after NAMA's establishment, the Irish government was compelled for other, but similar, reasons to seek a European Union-International Monetary Fund bailout in November 2010, the outcome of which will have considerable effects on NAMA's future operations.

Despite this early criticism, as of year end 2018, NAMA had recovered €37.4bn from its owned assets and projected that it would eventually generate a net surplus of €4bn. As of December 2024, NAMA had delivered a total surplus of €4.69bn to the Department of Finance, and projected that its final net surplus would be more than €5.2bn. The agency was formally dissolved on 31 July 2026, having generated a return of €5.6bn to the State.

== Background ==
As a result of the collapse of the Irish property market, Irish banks have property development loan assets secured on property with a market value significantly below the amount owed. Many loans are now non-performing due to debtors experiencing acute financial difficulties. Both factors have led to a sharp drop in the value of these loan assets.

If the banks were to recognise the true value of these loans on their balance sheets, they would no longer meet their statutory capital requirements. The banks, therefore, need to raise further capital; however, given the uncertainty around the true value of their assets, their stock is in too little demand for a general share issuance to be a viable option.

The banks are also suffering a liquidity crisis due, in part, to their lack of suitable collateral for European Central Bank repo loans. Along with their capital requirement problems, this is limiting the banks' ability to offer credit to their customers and, in turn, contributing to the lack of growth in the Irish economy.

== NAMA's operations ==
The National Asset Management Agency Bill, in its current format, applies to the six financial institutions which were covered by the Irish government's deposit guarantee scheme. Those institutions were Bank of Ireland, Allied Irish Banks, Anglo Irish Bank, EBS, Permanent TSB and Irish Nationwide. Other institutions, such as Ulster Bank, which are not covered, had the option to join the scheme. Ulster Bank eventually decided not to do so; its parent company Royal Bank of Scotland having joined the analogous UK scheme earlier in 2009.

Then-Minister for Finance, Brian Lenihan said the banks would have to assume significant losses when the loans, largely made to property developers, are removed from their books. If such losses resulted in the banks needing more capital, then the government would insist on taking an equity stake in the lenders. Economist Peter Bacon, who was appointed by the government to advise on solutions to the banking crisis, said the new agency had potential to bring a better economic solution to the banking crisis and was preferable to nationalising the banks.

The assets were to be purchased by using government bonds, which led to a significant increase in Ireland's gross national debt.

The Bill provided for NAMA to be established on a statutory basis as a separate body corporate with its own Board appointed by the Minister for Finance and with management services provided by the National Treasury Management Agency.

The Bill envisaged that NAMA would arrange and supervise the identification and valuation of property-backed loans on the books of qualifying financial institutions in Ireland, but would delegate the purchase and management of these loans to a separately created Special Purpose Vehicle (SPV).

== Master Special Purpose Vehicle ==
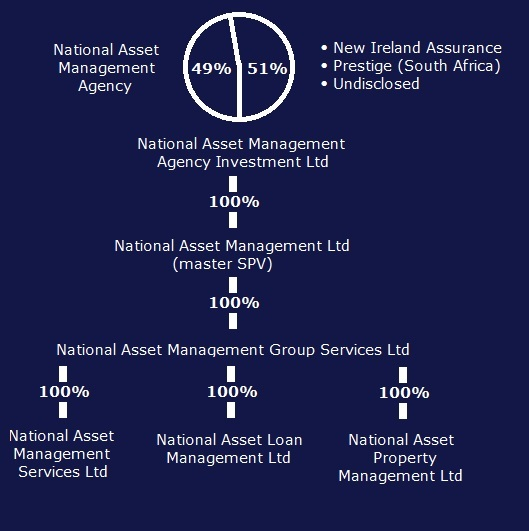
NAMA SPV structure

In a letter from the Central Statistics Office of Ireland (CSO) to Eurostat, dated 22 September 2009, details are provided on the suggested creation by NAMA of a Master Special Purpose Vehicle (SPV) known as National Asset Management Ltd and controlled by the holding company National Asset Management Agency Investment Ltd. The CSO sought guidance from Eurostat on how NAMA and the SPV would be classified in national accounts.

NAMA arranged and supervised the identification and valuation of property-backed loans on the books of qualifying financial institutions in Ireland, but the purchase and management of these loans were the responsibility of the SPV. The SPV has a majority of private equity. It funds the purchase of the loan books from financial institutions by issuing securities, most of which are backed by a guarantee from the Irish Government.

According to the details provided to Eurostat, the Master SPV is a separate legal entity and is jointly owned by private investors, who would own 51% of its equity and therefore have the majority vote, and by NAMA, which would hold the remaining 49%. The subscribed capital of the Master SPV would be €100m. Although the SPV has its own Board, NAMA retains a veto over all decisions of the Board that could affect the interests of NAMA or of the Irish government. The Master SPV is run with the objective of making a profit on the purchase and management of the assets it purchases.

The private investors in the Master SPV are entitled to the following economic return: the equity investors will receive an annual dividend linked to the performance of the Master SPV; On winding up of the Master SPV, the equity investors would only be repaid their capital if the Master SPV has the resources; they would receive a further equity bonus of 10% of the capital if the Master SPV makes a profit; All other profits and gains of the Master SPV would accrue to NAMA.

Former Finance Minister, the late Brian Lenihan believed that pension funds could be the most appropriate investors in the SPV. The annual dividend, should one be paid, is to be capped at the 10-year Irish Government bond yield at the time the dividend is declared. Lenihan said he was confident that the €51m could be found from suitable investors because of the similarity of the SPV investment to a government bond.

In its analysis, the Central Statistics Office (CSO) requested that NAMA be classified as a Government Entity and the Master SPV as a Financial Institution; the likely impact of this classification could be that the debt issued by the SPV, guaranteed by the Irish government, would not be classified as part of the national debt of Ireland by Eurostat.

In a letter dated 16 October 2009, Eurostat gave a preliminary view. The letter stated that NAMA is to be treated as part of the government sector, the type of assets to be purchased cannot be expanded without the approval of the European Commission, that it be a temporary scheme and that the size of potential losses be small relative to the total liabilities. Eurostat noted that the Minister for Finance will examine at the end of 2012 whether NAMA has met its objectives and decide if its continuation is justified. It suggested that a detailed analysis has to be carried out, especially of the guarantee arrangements. It made no judgement on the draft NAMA business plan but stated that the presence of market investors is reassuring to it (those providing 51% of the equity in the SPV). Their preliminary conclusion is that the Master SPV may be classified as a financial corporation. However, this is a preliminary view and is subject to revision.

== NAMA's private investors ==
The three investors owning 51% of the SPV were revealed by the Minister of Finance in April 2010, and in NAMA's June 2010 business plan:

- Irish Life Investment Managers, a part of Permanent TSB;
- New Ireland Assurance, a part of Bank of Ireland;
- Clients of Allied Irish Banks Investment Managers, a part of Allied Irish Banks

Each provided €17m for a total of €51m of NAMA's initial capital of €100m. NAMA then geared up way above typical EU banking limits, taking on debt 35 times its paid-up capital. The reason given for this is that the loans are temporary; they have bought other loans at a discount (see below); will be repaid on property sales; and are subject to continuous review. They are similar in function to bridging loans.

The purpose of NAMA's quasi-independent legal status is to remove its debts from general Irish government debt. This is the position of the government, the International Monetary Fund and Eurostat.

But, as the three private investors are bank-run pension fund managers, whose parent or major-shareholder companies had been all but nationalised by 2011, and as the 2010 Credit Institutions (Stabilisation) Act allows the government powers to apply to the courts to restructure any financial body in any way in secret at any time, and as a general guarantee to protect the parent banks remains in place (see the covered institutions below), the international rating agencies consider NAMA's debts to be a part of Irish government debt. Besides, NAMA's directors on the SPV board "will maintain a veto over all decisions of the Board that could affect the interests of NAMA or of the Irish government."

=== Sale of AIB and Irish Life Investment Managers' stakes ===
Following the acquisition of Allied Irish Banks by the Irish government the SPV stakeholding was sold to South African investor Prestige. In April 2012, the stakeholding in the SPV belonging to Irish Life Investment Managers was sold on the order of the minister for finance, Michael Noonan, to an undisclosed investor. These sales are necessitated by each nationalisation raising the government's stake from a minority 49 percent to a majority to 66 percent.

== Timetable ==
The National Treasury Management Agency published details on NAMA in a press release dated 8 April 2009. The draft bill was published on 30 July 2009 for public consultation. Following the consultation process, the National Asset Management Agency (NAMA) Bill 2009 was published on 10 September 2009. The bill was debated in the Dáil and Seanad, and passed, on 15 October 2009 by 77 votes to 73. The committee stage of the bill started on 22 October 2009. Following the passing of the bill in both houses of the Oireachtas, President Mary McAleese decided to sign the bill into law on 22 November 2009, despite calls from the Labour Party to seek advice from the Council of State regarding its constitutionality.

== Defining "long-term economic value" ==
The assets will be taken on at a discount, referred to as a haircut, estimated at 30% of book value, and in exchange the banks will be given bonds to sell to raise cash. The 30% discount to the €77bn book value outlined by NAMA includes circa €9bn of unpaid interest. The current value of the assets will not be based on their estimated market value, but on a higher notional "long-term economic value". This higher value is ultimately based on the share prices of Irish banks, which were low in March 2009 but have risen since.

Critics say that this is a circular argument; were the expected discount 50% or more, the banks' share prices would have collapsed. In early September 2009 Minister Lenihan pointed to this rise in share prices as positive news: "... markets have assessed that information in the context of their current share price and rating agencies have used it in their assessment of these institutions." Should an independent NAMA valuation be too low, Lenihan said: "I can give directions to NAMA to have a valuation reconsidered."

In addition, critics also pointed out that the use of the term, often capitalised, Long Term Economic Value which was popular in the press around the time of the establishment of NAMA, often as the acronym LTEV, gave the impression that it was a well-known or accepted term in economics. It was pointed out that, in fact, the acronym did not appear on any internet page before 2009, with the full term appearing only shortly before, with the concept of LTEV being invented primarily to give political cover for paying from taxpayers' funds, a price in excess of the market value of assets.

Problems relating to paying the notional long-term economic value (rather than market value) for the loans to be transferred to NAMA were highlighted by the difficulties of Liam Carroll's Zoe Developments. In July 2009, Zoe Developments, a large property development company, made an application to court seeking the appointment of an examiner. The appointment of an examiner would have allowed it protection from its creditors. Zoe Developments was estimated to have €1.2bn of loans with a likely deficit of €900m in a liquidation scenario. The €1.2bn of loans included debts of €489m to AIB and €113m to Bank of Ireland. In addition to Zoe Developments, Carroll's overall liabilities, including other businesses are estimated to total €2.8bn. On 10 September 2009, High Court judge Frank Clarke refused to appoint an examiner to Zoe Developments despite the support of AIB and Bank of Ireland for such an appointment. Receivers have been appointed after a Supreme Court appeal failed. A deficit of €900m versus loans of €1.2bn if realised would imply a market value of 25% of loan value for Zoe Developments.

On 9 September 2009, economist Philip Lane of Trinity College Dublin published a paper on Estimating Long Term Economic Value. Using economic theory and formulae, Lane describes the long-term economic value being a function of both nominal price levels and the real (inflation-adjusted) economic value of property. The real economic value of property is further defined as a function of numerous factors including, but not limited to: real disposable income per capita; the level of long-term interest rates; the size of the population, and; the demographic structure of the population. On implementation of long-term economic value, Lane highlights the concerns over price levels. In particular, given the debate on domestic competitiveness versus other countries, Ireland may experience real-exchange rate depreciation, which could have a drag effect of nominal property value. He said, "it is important that the NAMA process to recognise the inevitability of such uncertainty in the determining of long-term economic values". As a result, he favours a two-part payment system.

In his speech to the Dáil on 16 September 2009, the Minister of Finance Brian Lenihan indicated that alternatives to NAMA that did not use long-term economic value would lead to the need for fresh equity to be injected by the government into the financial sector of between €4 and 7 billion. Coincidentally, the upper end of this figures is equal to the difference between the €54 billion estimated "long-term economic value" and the €47 billion "current market value". Lenihan noted that the additional €4-7 billion would be an incremental investment in the banks rather than a higher payment for the loans.

== Academic and political criticism ==
The agency has been the subject of major criticism in both politics and academia. At the time of its establishment, then-Fine Gael Enterprise, Trade and Employment spokesperson, Leo Varadkar, said of NAMA: "(Fianna Fáil and government minister) Willie O'Dea and Peter Bacon, the architect of NAMA, both accept that this is a massive gamble. Taxpayers are right to ask why Fianna Fáil is so keen to gamble with their money without asking the banks, bondholders and institutional investors to take their fair share of the pain. In dealing with the banking crisis, the objective must be to minimise the risk to taxpayers and to get credit flowing to businesses and homebuyers. NAMA achieves neither of these objectives. It won't get credit flowing and it exposes taxpayers to all of the risk." Fine Gael instead proposed a 'national recovery bank'.

Then-Labour Party Enterprise spokesperson and former Finance Minister Ruairi Quinn accused the Government of "proposing to establish the biggest property company in the world and asking taxpayers to foot the bill and bear all the risk." He stated that "this Bill will be one of the most important pieces of legislation ever to have come before Dáil Éireann. There will be enormous consequences for the taxpayer if the government get it wrong." Labour instead has proposed the temporary nationalisation of the banks.

A commentary signed by leading academics also questioned the NAMA strategy. They wrote in The Irish Times that they saw

...nationalisation as being the inevitable consequence of a required recapitalisation of the banks done on terms that are fair for the taxpayer. We can summarise our arguments in favour of nationalisation, and against the Government's current approach of limited recapitalisation and the introduction of an asset management agency, under four headings. We consider that nationalisation will better protect taxpayers' interests, produce a more efficient and longer lasting solution to our banking problems, be more transparent in relation to pricing of distressed assets, and be far more likely to produce a banking system free from the toxic reputation that our current financial institutions have deservedly earned.

The criticisms were disputed by the Government. Then-Tánaiste and Minister for Enterprise, Trade and Employment Mary Coughlan defended the creation of the agency saying it was not a bailout for the banks, one of the charges made against it.

On 7 October 2009, Professor Joseph Stiglitz, winner of the Nobel Prize in economics and former chief economist of the World Bank, speaking at Trinity College Dublin criticised NAMA. He said, "Countries which allow banks to go under by following the ordinary rules of capitalism have done fine. The US has let 100 banks go this year alone, as did Sweden and Norway in their crises." As well as commenting that in Ireland, "this bank bailout is a simple transfer from taxpayers to bondholders, and it will saddle generations to come. The only thing that might give you solace is that, as chief economist of the World Bank, we see this type of thing happening in banana republics all over the world. Whenever a banking crisis happens, the financial sector uses the turmoil as a mechanism to transfer wealth from the general population to themselves. I've been very disappointed to see that it has happened, not only in banana republics, but in advanced industrialised countries."

On 21 October 2009, ahead of the International Financial Services Summit (IFSS) in Dublin on 5 November 2009, two leading economists expressed caution on NAMA. Professor Nouriel Roubini, Professor at New York University Stern School of Business said that: It is essential that the bad assets are taken off the balance sheets of the financial institutions and that the Government separates the good assets from the bad assets to clean up the financial system.... But if it does it in such a way that implies it is buying these assets at overpriced prices that does not reflect the underlying value, then it is giving a big subsidy to the bank shareholders and the unsecured creditors." Professor Willem Buiter, Professor of political economy at the London School of Economics and former member of the UK Monetary Policy Committee, said: the Irish Government should have, in principle, gone for a good bank, not a bad bank.... The bad bank is always a bad idea because it means that the Government underwrites all the creditors and creates moral hazard." Other participants at the IFSS include Martin Wolf, Chief Economics Commentator, Financial Times and Philip Lane, Professor of International Macroeconomics at Trinity College Dublin.

In February 2010 Brian Cowen defended his claim that the NAMA would increase the supply of credit into the economy despite the International Monetary Fund (IMF) saying it would not lead to any significant increase. "People should contemplate what level of credit accessibility we'd have in this economy without NAMA," he said. "It's not just sufficient in itself obviously for credit flow, it's certainly an important and necessary part of restructuring our banking system, of that there's no doubt, in terms of improving as a location for funding of banking operations," said Mr Cowen. He previously said that the Government's objective in restructuring the banks through NAMA was to "generate more access to credit for Irish business at this critical time". In September 2009, Lenihan expressed a similar view, saying it would lead to more lending for business and households. Cowen was responding to reports published on 8 February that the IMF had told Lenihan in April 2009 that the NAMA would not lead to a significant increase in lending by the banks.

The comments, which appear in internal Department of Finance documents released under the Freedom of Information Act, were made by senior IMF official Steven Seelig who joined the board of NAMA in May 2010. Minutes of a private meeting at the department between Brian Lenihan and IMF officials on 29 April 2009 last state that the "IMF (Mr Seelig) do not believe that Nama will result in significant increase in bank lending in Ireland". The Government has maintained that NAMA's purchase of bad loans from the banks with State bonds would increase the flow of credit in the economy since the plan was unveiled April 2009. Speaking at the publication of the NAMA legislation in September 2009, Mr Lenihan said it would "strengthen and improve" the funding positions of the banks "so that they can lend to viable businesses and households". The IMF estimated in their published report the domestic banks would face losses of up to €35 billion, though the department pointed out this would be partly funded from operating profits and provisions already taken against some loan losses.

== Supplementary Data and Draft Business Plan ==
On 16 September 2009, NAMA published Supplementary Data Document that contained high level statistic on NAMA, data on property yields, and information on the six covered institutions. The supplemental data indicated the book-value of the loans expected to be transferred to NAMA by the six covered institutions (Bank of Ireland, Allied Irish Banks, Anglo Irish Bank, EBS, Permanent TSB, Irish Nationwide) was €68bn. The suggested transfer value was €54bn, with the estimated market value at €47bn.

In addition to the supplementary data document, the Department of Finance published incremental data on 13 October 2009 in a Draft NAMA Business Plan.

	Total€, billion
Assets value at origination	88
Approximate average LTV	77%
Net Original Balance excluding Interest roll up	68
Potential decline in property prices approximate estimate	47%
Estimated current market value of underlying asset	47
Interest Roll up Estimate	9
Potential total book value for transfer to NAMA	77
Haircut on loans	30%
Price NAMA could pay for loans	54

Within the Supplementary Data Document there is data on the financial ratios of the six covered banks. Adding up the Tier 1 capital of the six covered institutions, as reported in the Supplemental Data document leads to total Tier 1 capital of €29bn. This compares to combined risk-weighted-assets of €363bn, and a Tier 1 capital ratio of 7.9%. Basel II recommends a minimum ratio of 4% capital requirement.

Institution	Date of report	Risk-weighted assets, € million	Tier 1 Capital€, million	Tier 1 ratio
Allied Irish Banks	30 June 2009	131,327	10,249	7.8%
Bank of Ireland	31 March 2009	105,377	11,026	10.5%
Anglo Irish Bank	31 March 2009	80,175	3,120	3.9%
Permanent TSB	30 June 2009	21,619	2,006	9.3%
Irish Nationwide	31 December 2008	14,825	1,394	9.4%
EBS	30 June 2009	9,984	769	7.7%
Total		363,307	28,564	7.9%

According to the Supplementary Data Document, the long-term-economic value of the loans transferred to NAMA was 15% higher than the market value. NAMA applied statutory adjustment factors to estimate the valuation of €54bn. The document also noted that asset prices would need to increase from current market values by 10%, for the government and taxpayers to avoid any loss, taking into account subordinated debt. The difference between the 15% uplift to get to €54bn and the need for a 10% uplift for the taxpayer to avoid a loss, was explained in the Draft NAMA Business Plan. This analysis took into account the expected part payment in subordinate debt to the six covered institutions of €2.7bn (circa 5% of the €54bn transfer value). This subordinated debt holders may receive none of the proceeds in a scenario where the taxpayers are exposed to a loss.

=== Market response ===
On Thursday 17 September 2009, the day after the estimated cost of NAMA was announced, shares in AIB and Bank of Ireland rose in value. On the ISEQ Index, shares in AIB rose by 30% and shares in Bank of Ireland rose by 17%. Shares for both banks were also up on the U.S. stock markets.

=== Analysis of the data ===
Based on the information presented in the Supplementary Data Document, if the €68bn book value was transferred at €54bn to NAMA, the covered institutions could be a write-down of both their Tier 1 capital and Risk-weighted assets of €14bn in aggregate. Assuming a 1-for-1 write-down of €14bn in the risk weighted assets and the same of the Tier 1 capital, the new ratio would be 4.2% with risk weighted assets of €349bn and Tier 1 capital of €15bn.

Assuming the transfer value was at the market-value estimate of €47bn, not €54bn, then Tier 1 capital could fall by €21bn not €14bn. Risk weighted assets could be €342bn and Tier 1 capital €8bn, with a ratio of 2.2%.

	Risk-Weighted-Assets€, billion	Tier 1 Capital€, billion	Tier 1 ratio
Aggregate, 6 Covered Institutions	363	29	7.9%
Suggested Transfer Value to NAMA	54		
Estimated Book Value	68		
Potential Write-Down	-14	-14	
Aggregate, 6 Covered Institutions, Adjusted	349	15	4.2%
Additional Right if use Estimated Market Value of €47 billion	-7	-7	
Aggregate, 6 Covered Institutions, Adjusted	342	8	2.2%

However, this analysis looks at the aggregate data provided in the Supplemental Data Document. For a clearer picture, NAMA would need to give a breakdown of the loans to be transferred, by institution, as well as the book value and market value of each. Some additional information was provided on 13 October 2009 in the Draft NAMA Business Plan, indicates that the six covered institutions have taken €7bn of provisions in the last year against loan impairments and giving the split of the €77bn of prospective loans for transfer to NAMA. However, the data point of the current net book value of the loan portfolios and the prospective transfer price for the portfolios by each of the 6 covered institutions was omitted.

=== Transfer of derivatives portfolio to NAMA ===
In addition to the potential loan book transfer to NAMA, the Draft NAMA Business Plan outlined the existence of over 1,000 derivative positions attached to the commercial loans. These loans were transferred to NAMA as well. The nominal value of this derivative portfolio was €14.7 billion. Developers and other borrowers in real-estate transactions are often required by lenders to enter into derivative transactions as part of a loan agreement, as a mechanism to fix the interest rate on the loan. Typically, interest rate swap agreements are used. If interest rates fall, the borrower does not benefit, as he/she must pay the saving to the counter-party of the swap agreement. Given the decline in interest rates over the last 2 years (e.g. the US Federal Funds Rate was 0.25% in late September 2009 versus 5.25% in August 2007), there may be a significant liability relating to the €14.7bn derivative portfolio. The Draft NAMA Business Plan does not elaborate on the magnitude of this liability, however, it states: "These derivatives change the interest rate structure of the underlying loans and their mark-to-market value will be incorporated into the valuation of the loans".

=== Post transfer ===
The information provided in the Supplementary Data Document also included analysis of the total loan books of the covered institutions. In particular it identified, €27bn of watch loans (low quality), €31bn of vulnerable loans (past due) and €29bn of impaired loans. That was a total of €86bn of loans, at net book value. This was in excess of the loans expected to be transferred to NAMA. Following the potential transfer of loans with a book value of €68bn to NAMA, the six covered institutions would still have an aggregate of €18bn of loans that were watch loans, vulnerable, and/or impaired. This exceeded the €15bn of Tier 1 Capital within the six banks, after the NAMA transfer.

Institution	Date of report	Net loan book€, million	Watch loans / lower quality loans€, million	Vulnerable loans / past due loans€, million	Impaired loans€, million
Allied Irish Banks	31 December 2009	130,000	12,120	8,604	17,453
Bank of Ireland	31 December 2009	134,700	3,300	5,400	13,400
Anglo Irish Bank	31 December 2009	72,100	6,200	8,700	34,600
Permanent TSB	31 December 2009	38,639	2,877	3,208	828
Irish Nationwide	31 December 2009	11,132	1,721		6,464
EBS	30 June 2009	17,035	603	697	407
Total		403,606	26,821	26,609	73,152

The Draft NAMA Business Plan indicated that the potential loans for transfer to NAMA of €77bn book value (including rolled-up interest) was divided into €24.1 billion from AIB, €28.4 billion from Anglo-Irish Bank, €15.5 billion from Bank of Ireland, €0.8 billion from EBS, and €8.3 billion from Irish Nationwide.

The document stated "that about 40% of the loans are estimated to be cash-generating". This indicated that €46 billion of the loans were not paying interest. Of the €31 billion that were cash-generating, there was no indication in the document if they were paying the full requirements under the terms of the loan agreements. The €31 billion was divided into €28 billion of commercial loans and €3 billion of land and development loans. This compared to a breakdown of the €77 billion of €28 billion of commercial loans, €21 billion of land and development loans, and €28 billion of associated loans.

Additional data on the size of the underlying loans was also provided in the Draft Business Plan. Of particular note was that the 10 largest underlying loans had a projected book value of €16 billion (i.e. 20% of the overall €77 billion), with an average loan size of €1.6 billion each. The top 100 underlying loans totalled €38 billion, equivalent to 49% of the overall.

In July 2010 after the a revised business plan was published it was revealed that it was then predicting a possible profit of €1bn, with the possibility of losses of up to €800m, after an initially projection of more than €4bn in profit. The plan published then updated and revised the interim business plan published in October of the previous year which was prepared on the basis of information supplied at that time by the five participating institutions (Anglo Irish Bank, AIB, Bank of Ireland, EBS and Irish Nationwide) and in advance of the detailed examination of any of the key loans by NAMA. Then-Finance Minister Brian Lenihan denied that the Government got its sums wrong on NAMA. The original business plan estimated a profit of €4.8bn based on a rise in assets value of 10%. The revised figures said that if they recovered the full value of the loans plus 10% it would result in a profit of €3.9bn. NAMA chairman Frank Daly said the plan confirmed that the five institutions covered by NAMA had not disclosed or had been unaware of the extent of the financial crisis afflicting their borrowers. He said the banks had shown 'remarkable generosity' towards their borrowers, adding that NAMA had no intention of maintaining that approach. 'To say the least we are extremely disappointed and disturbed to find that, only months after being led to believe that 40% of loans were income producing, the real figure is actually 25%.

=== Raising new equity capital ===
If there are further substantial write-downs within the Irish banking industry post-NAMA this could lead to further financial difficulties. Patrick Honohan, a professor of International Financial Economics and Development at Trinity College Dublin, and shortly afterwards to be appointed head of the Central Bank of Ireland, stated on 21 July 2009 that "Unless the loans are valued at unrealistically high prices, the NAMA process will leave the banks with insufficient capital. This is especially true considering the additional loan losses in non-property lending that are inevitable given the depth of the recession and which will have to be provided for." Professor Honohan was appointed Governor of the Central Bank of Ireland and Financial Services Authority by the Minister of Finance in late September 2009.

On 5 October 2009, the Irish Independent reported that European banks needed to raise substantial equity capital, including AIB and BOI. The article quoted a report by the bank JP Morgan which estimated that the AIB and BoI needed to raise a combined €11bn, €7bn for AIB and €4bn for BoI.

On 8 October 2009, Brian Lenihan, then-Minister of Finance, said that even after selling real-estate loans to the government's NAMA, that the country's biggest banks may need further money. Additional funding from the Irish government was highlighted, with Lenihan recognising that it would be difficult to raise funds on the stock market.

On 10 October 2009, the Irish Times reported that Bank of Ireland and AIB could need to raise a combined €9bn as a result of write-downs associated with the transfer of assets to NAMA. The article quotes a Merrion Capital report that estimates that AIB and BoI's equity Tier 1 Capital ratios would fall to 3.3% and 3.5% in 2010/11.

In the Draft NAMA Business Plan published on 13 October 2009, it stated that: "After the transfer of their L&D and associated loans to NAMA, it is likely that some institutions will require additional capital in order to absorb the consequent write-downs on the book value of their assets. The Government indicated that it expected institutions to seek private sector capital in the first place but to the extent that sufficient capital cannot be raised independently or generated internally, it remained committed to providing institutions with an appropriate level of capital to continue to meet their requirement."

=== Capital from a debt-for-equity swap ===
The August 2009 open letter by 46 academics reported in the Irish Times, suggests that the Government is in a strong position, if it chooses, to negotiate with bondholders to engage in some debt for equity swaps. The information provided in the Supplementary Data Document shows an aggregate of €20bn of sub-ordinate debt at the six covered institutions. Assuming all or part of this sub-ordinate debt is converted into equity could play a role in improving the Tier 1 ratio of the industry.

The concept of subordinated debt holders receiving no return on their loans, is raised in the Draft NAMA Business Plan, where the subordinated debt issued to the covered institutions, could receive nothing in a scenario where the Irish taxpayer incurs a loss on its investment in NAMA. 5% of the €54 billion purchase price is forecast to be paid in sub-ordinated loans.

=== The Draft Business Plan ===
The Draft Business plan assumed a life of 11 years for NAMA from 2010 to 2020 with full repayment of the €54 billion loans issued by NAMA/Irish Government by the end of 2020. Cumulative interest on the loans is forecast at €16 billion, using the forward Swap rate for the euro. Given a percentage of the loans are cash-generative this €16 billion may be partially offset by an estimated €12 billion of interest received. The Draft business plan expects a default rate of 20% on the €77 billion of principal, and repayment of €62 billion. The €15 billion of defaulted loans is forecast to be sold for €4 billion (i.e. circa 27% of loan value). Fees and running costs of NAMA are estimated at €240m per annum, i.e. circa €3 billion over 11 years. Taking all of these cash-flows together leads to a cumulative positive cash flow of €5 billion.

The Draft Business Plan looks at sensitivity analysis, indicating that if short and/or long-term interest rates rise, there would be an erosion of the €5 billion positive cash flow to NAMA. Similarly, if the default rate increases, this cash flow would be eroded. The document states that an increase of the default rate to 31% would erode in full the net present value of the positive cash flow.

The Draft Business Plan does not attempt to match the €62 billion of principal repayments and €4 billion of asset recovery (of the estimated €15 billion of defaulting loans) to the €54 billion "long-term-economic value" expected to be paid for the NAMA loan portfolio. Nor is there any analysis comparing the forecast €15 billion of defaults relative to the estimates 60% of loans, i.e. €46 billion, that are not cash-generative.

A part of the Draft Business Plan that is mentioned but not modeled in the document, is the ability of the NAMA to borrow an incremental €5 billion to pursue its "asset development/enhancement objectives". In particular, NAMA may invest in projects that are deemed commercially viable. NAMA shall inherit with the loans, undrawn commitments of €6.5bn to the borrowers.

== Risk-sharing v ex post levy ==
On 6 May 2009, Professor Honohan presented his views on NAMA to the Joint Oireachtas Committee on Finance and the Public Service. In particular, he raised the idea of a two-part payment to the banks, part debt and part equity, as a mechanism to reduce the risk to the taxpayer of overpaying for the loans. He specifically identified this mechanism as being superior to an ex-post levy on the banks. An additional advantage of paying part-equity for the loans, that Professor Honohan mentions in his paper, is the benefit of having some private shareholders within NAMA, given "the extensive international evidence showing that Government-owned banking systems serve their economies poorly."

On 9 October 2009, Fianna Fáil and the Green Party, the two parties of the Irish government at the time, agreed a "Renewed Programme for Government". In this agreement, it stated that "should NAMA make a loss over time, a levy would be imposed to recoup the cost to taxpayers". This proposal was not in line with the preferred option that Professor Honohan highlighted.

In the letter from Eurostat to the CSO dated 16 October 2009, it is noted that in addition to the 5% of the purchase price paid in subordinate bonds, that reduces the potential losses of the Irish taxpayer, that an amendment to the legislation that shall be introduced means that the participating banks shall have to pay a tax surcharge on their operating profits until the loss of the Master SPV, related to NAMA, is recouped.

== Operations in 2010-11 ==
NAMA published its 2010 accounts and summarised its more recent achievements in July 2011. In round figures it had acquired loans of €72 billion for €30 billion. To buy these it had issued bonds worth €30 billion that buyers could sell to the European Central Bank (ECB). The banks' losses of €42 billion written off on these sales, and their other losses, were met by Irish government cash or loans that were advanced or ultimately guaranteed by the ECB. €3.9 billion-worth of sales both in and outside Ireland had been approved by NAMA in a difficult market, given the scale of the Great Recession.

In that the main purpose of NAMA was to remove bad debts from the six banks and to recapitalize them, it was hard to see how it had made a difference in the short term. The plan relied upon an early worldwide recovery from recession, which did not occur. Government support for the banks continued separately from NAMA and had risen to 32% of GDP by September 2010.

In turn, the government's support for NAMA itself was quantified in July 2010 by the IMF as "more than 25% of GDP in 2010". The financial markets concluded that Ireland could not support the cost of the banks as well as NAMA, and run a budget deficit, and they sold Irish bonds at the time of the renewal of the two-year state bank guarantee in September 2010, causing yields to rise. It became impossible for the government itself to borrow from the bond markets. The drop in value of Irish bonds also had an immediate effect on the balance sheets of Irish and foreign banks' capital requirements.

As a result, in November 2010 the Irish government was itself obliged to seek a €67 billion net "bailout" from the ECB and IMF and undertook in return that the sale of the six banks' remaining assets outside NAMA would be "expedited"; part of the money was to cover future losses incurred by buyers of those assets. By early 2011 the six banks' liquidity needs were being supported by a further €150 billion from the ECB. Despite all the efforts to save them, in April 2011 the six banks' credit ratings were reduced to junk status by Moody's.

== Recent developments ==
In February 2011, the Supreme Court delivered judgment in an appeal taken by Paddy McKillen against a purported decision to acquire loans taken out by Mr. McKillen and companies controlled by him. The court found that the decision had been taken by a group of senior managers before NAMA had been formed and accordingly there was no decision of NAMA to acquire the loans.

In April 2011 NAMA announced that it would commence selling home mortgages to private investors on the basis that the investor pays equity of 30% of the asking price of the loan, with NAMA providing financing for the balance.

=== Status as a public authority ===
Following an appeal from journalist Gavin Sheridan the Irish Office of the Commissioner for Environmental Information determined in September 2011 that NAMA was a public authority for the purposes of the Access to Information on the Environment (AIE) Regulations 2007, and was therefore obliged to answer AIE requests from applicants. The Regulations in question were the Irish transposition of European Directive 2003/4/EC, an implementation of one element of the Aarhus Convention into EU law.

NAMA disagreed with this decision and appealed to the High Court on a point of law. In February 2013 High Court judge Colm Mac Eochaidh ruled in favour of the Commissioner for Environmental Information. The case centred on the statutory interpretation of the term "and includes" in Irish law. The case cost a total of €121,350 to the Irish taxpayer up to that point.

NAMA appealed the High Court's decision to the Supreme Court, and the case was first heard on 7 April 2014 before Chief Justice Susan Denham, Mr Justice Murray, Mr Justice Hardiman, Mr Justice O'Donnell and Ms Justice Dunne. On 23 June 2015 the Supreme Court dismissed NAMA's appeal and ruled that it was in fact subject to the AIE Regulations. The court relied on an earlier ruling of the European Court of Justice in Fish Legal, where the court ruled that, "entities which, organically, are administrative authorities, namely those which form part of the public administration or the executive of the State at whatever level, are public authorities for the purposes of Article 2(2)(a) of Directive 2003/4. This first category includes all legal persons governed by public law which have been set up by the State and which it alone can decide to dissolve".

=== Geoghegan Review ===
In December 2011 the Agency published the Geoghegan Review, a report on NAMA's functional organisation, skills and delegation arrangements produced by the former Group Chief Executive of HSBC Holdings Plc, Michael Geoghegan. The Review includes a number of non-binding recommendations for the Agency's Board, including the need to be more entrepreneurial in focus and proposing a greater delegation of authorities from the Board to the Executive.

In February 2012, Paddy McKillen won the latest hearing on a preliminary issue in his UK legal battle with the Barclay brothers for control of the five-star Maybourne Hotel Group in London. The latest ruling strengthens his case against the Barclays to argue that Ireland's National Asset Management Agency unlawfully transferred €800 million of debt on the hotels to the brothers last September.

=== NAMA to Nature ===
In March 2012 a group called NAMA to Nature began planting trees on NAMA sites in a symbolic protest against the failure of the government agency to address the enduring presence of ghost estates and the failure of developers to clear unfinished construction sites. This action was reported in thejournal.ie. It was also reported in the Irish Times. Two of the participants were interviewed on The John Murray Radio Show

=== Northern Ireland loan sale ===
In early April 2014, NAMA sold a portfolio of Northern Ireland loans for £4.5bn (€5.4bn). The deal brokered was NAMA's single biggest transaction to date and followed an extensive sales process involving bidders from both the US and Europe. The loan book (aka Project Eagle) included a portfolio of various commercial properties in the North. It was reported to have been initially acquired by NAMA for £1bn (€1.2bn).

The Northern Ireland Assembly's Committee for Finance and Personnel launched an inquiry into the sale after concerns were raised by Mick Wallace TD in the Dáil. The inquiry, led by Daithí McKay MLA, uncovered the fact that a meeting took place between DUP Ministers and potential bidders for the portfolio.

=== "Project Albion" portfolio sale ===
In 2015, under "Project Albion", NAMA sold a portfolio of United Kingdom commercial assets to Oaktree Capital Management for £115m that had had a book value of £226m.

=== Section 110 tax avoidance ===
In June 2016 Irish media outlets started noting that US distressed debt funds (known by the pejorative term "vulture funds") were filing Irish company accounts with large profits on their Irish investments (bought from NAMA) but no Irish tax payments. They could see the equity of these companies was "owned" by Irish registered Charities some of which were run by IFSC law firms.

It emerged these US "vulture funds" were using orphaned Section 110 SPVs (discovered because most Irish SPVs must file public accounts), structured by IFSC law and accounting firms, to export untaxed income and capital gains earned on domestic Irish assets to offshore locations (via the PPN interest payments) such as the Cayman Islands.

Stephen Donnelly TD called for a Dáil investigation and produced detailed calculations based on the scale of asset disposals by NAMA to US funds showing that the loss of Irish taxes could reach €20bn. The affair escalated during 2016 and was covered in the international media and in several Irish RTÉ Prime Time Investigates programs.

There was confusion when Dáil deputy Stephen Donnelly asked whether NAMA had knowingly sold assets to bidders with Section 110 SPVs. However, in later disclosures, Finance Minister Noonan stated that NAMA were users of the Section 110 SPVs, and would incur a €158m tax charge as a result of changes Noonan made to Section 110 legislation in the 2016 Finance Act.

The affair focused Irish public attention on the scale and speed at which funds had profited from NAMA sales, and led to some concern that NAMA had sold too quickly (and on a tax-free basis).

=== Garrett Kelleher Litigation ===
NAMA is the subject of US$1.2 billion lawsuit from former Irish property developer, Garrett Kelleher. The case, formally brought by Kelleher's company, Shelbourne North Water Street Corporation, concerns the financial collapse of Kelleher's 'Chicago Spire' development in Chicago, Illinois, USA; and seeks damages of $1.2bn against Nama, alleging that the agency destroyed the developer's chances of building the Chicago Spire through a combination of "sheer spite" and "consistent incompetence". The case, if it reaches court, would be the first time NAMA has faced a jury trial. The case is just one of a number of lawsuits Kelleher has brought, not always successfully, against NAMA.

=== Dissolution ===
In July 2026, Simon Harris signed a statutory instrument bringing NAMA to an end with effect from the end of that month. Remaining activity transfers to the National Treasury Management Agency. NAMA's final surplus was €5.6bn.

== See also ==
- Post-2008 Irish banking crisis
- Irish emergency budget, 2009
- National Treasury Management Agency
- Toxic asset
- European sovereign-debt crisis: List of acronyms
- Irish Section 110 SPVs
