= ABL Aviation =

Aircraft leasing company in Dublin, Ireland

- Type: Private
- Industry: Aircraft leasing
- Founded: 2014
- Founder: Ali Ben Lmadani
- Headquarters: Dublin, Ireland
- Area served: Worldwide
- Website: ablaviation.com

ABL Aviation is a global independent aircraft asset management company headquartered in Dublin, Ireland. Founded in 2014, the company specializes in structuring and managing aircraft investments for institutional investors, with a focus on new generation and mid-life commercial aircraft. As of April 2025, ABL Aviation has deployed over $5.9 billion in capital and manages assets exceeding $6.6 billion across a portfolio of 108 aircraft.

ABL Aviation maintains offices in six global financial and aviation hubs: Dublin, New York, Casablanca, Dubai, Hong Kong, and Tokyo.

== History ==
Ali Ben Lmadani founded ABL Aviation in December 2014 as a company specializing in Ground Support Equipment (GSE).

The company moved its headquarters to Dublin, Ireland. Then, additional offices were opened in Casablanca, Morocco, Dubai, United Arab Emirates, and Hong Kong, China.

In December 2018, ABL Aviation partnered with a Japanese conglomerate, a financial conglomerate in Japan, to use Japanese Operating Lease (JOL) and Japanese Operating Lease with Call Option (JOLCO) financing structures. The partnership concentrated on investments in new and midlife aircraft for commercial passenger and freight sectors.
