= Philip Reid (sportswriter) =

Irish sportswriter

Philip Reid (born 12 November 1961) is a sports journalist who is Golf Correspondent of The Irish Times newspaper.

== Career ==
Reid is a journalism graduate of Dublin Institute of Technology, TUD. He began his journalistic career with The Irish Press newspaper group in 1985.

He joined The Irish Times as a staff writer in 1996. Reid was the secretary of the Irish Golf Writers' Association from 2002 to 2022 and since 2023 is Chairman of Association of Golf Writers, the recognised international association for golf writers (AGW) He lives in Dublin.

Reid has covered every Ryder Cup since 1993. His coverage of the 2006 Ryder Cup, a notable victory by Europe over the US, was the basis of his book The Cup, (published by Maverick House) and is also the author of The Irish Majors (published by Gill) which was a best selling sports book.

He was one of four international golf journalists invited by the International Herald Tribune to a sports forum assessing US and European chances in the 2008 Ryder Cup.

== Works ==
- Globetrotter Golfers Guide: Ireland: Over 120 Courses and Facilities. Globetrotter. 2003. ISBN 1-85974-669-1.
- The cup: How the 2006 Ryder Cup was won. Maverick House. 2006. ISBN 1-905379-24-2.
  - Review: "Ryder Cup Books", Ryder Cup Diary, 2010.

"The Irish Majors" (Gill and Macmillan) was published in October 2012.
