= National Treasury Management Agency =

Irish government agency

- Irish: Gníomhaireacht Bainistíochta an Chisteáin Náisiúnta

State Agency of the Department of Finance overview
- Formed: 1 December 1990
- Jurisdiction: Ireland
- Headquarters: Treasury Dock, North Wall Quay, Dublin 1, D01 A9T8
- State Agency of the Department of Finance executive: Frank O'Connor, Chief Executive
- Website: NTMA website

The National Treasury Management Agency (NTMA; Irish: Gníomhaireacht Bainistíochta an Chisteáin Náisiúnta, GBCN) is the agency that manages the assets and liabilities of the Government of Ireland. It was established on 1 December 1990 to borrow for the Central Fund and manage the national debt. Since then it has been expanded greatly, for example it now manages the National Pensions Reserve Fund and acts as Ireland's agent for the purchase of carbon credits. Following the RTÉ secret payment scandal, the Government of Ireland agreed to add RTÉ to the list of commercial State sector companies subject to the formal oversight of the National Treasury Management Agency (NTMA)’s NewEra unit.

The National Asset Management Agency was established in December 2009 under the aegis of the agency to handle the Irish financial crisis and the deflation of the Irish property bubble.

== Ireland Strategic Investment Fund ==
The NTMA also handles the €8.1 billion Ireland Strategic Investment Fund (ISIF; Irish: An Ciste Infheistíochta Straitéisí d’Éirinn, GBCN), a sovereign wealth fund established on 22 December 2014.

Formed using the remaining assets of the National Pensions Reserve Fund, ISIF has a statutory mandate to invest in a manner designed to support Ireland's employment and economic activity.

== See also ==
- Economic and Social Research Institute
- Irish Fiscal Advisory Council
- Department of Finance (Ireland)
- Modified gross national income (Irish replacement for GDP/GNP)
