= Fergal O'Byrne =

Dublin writer

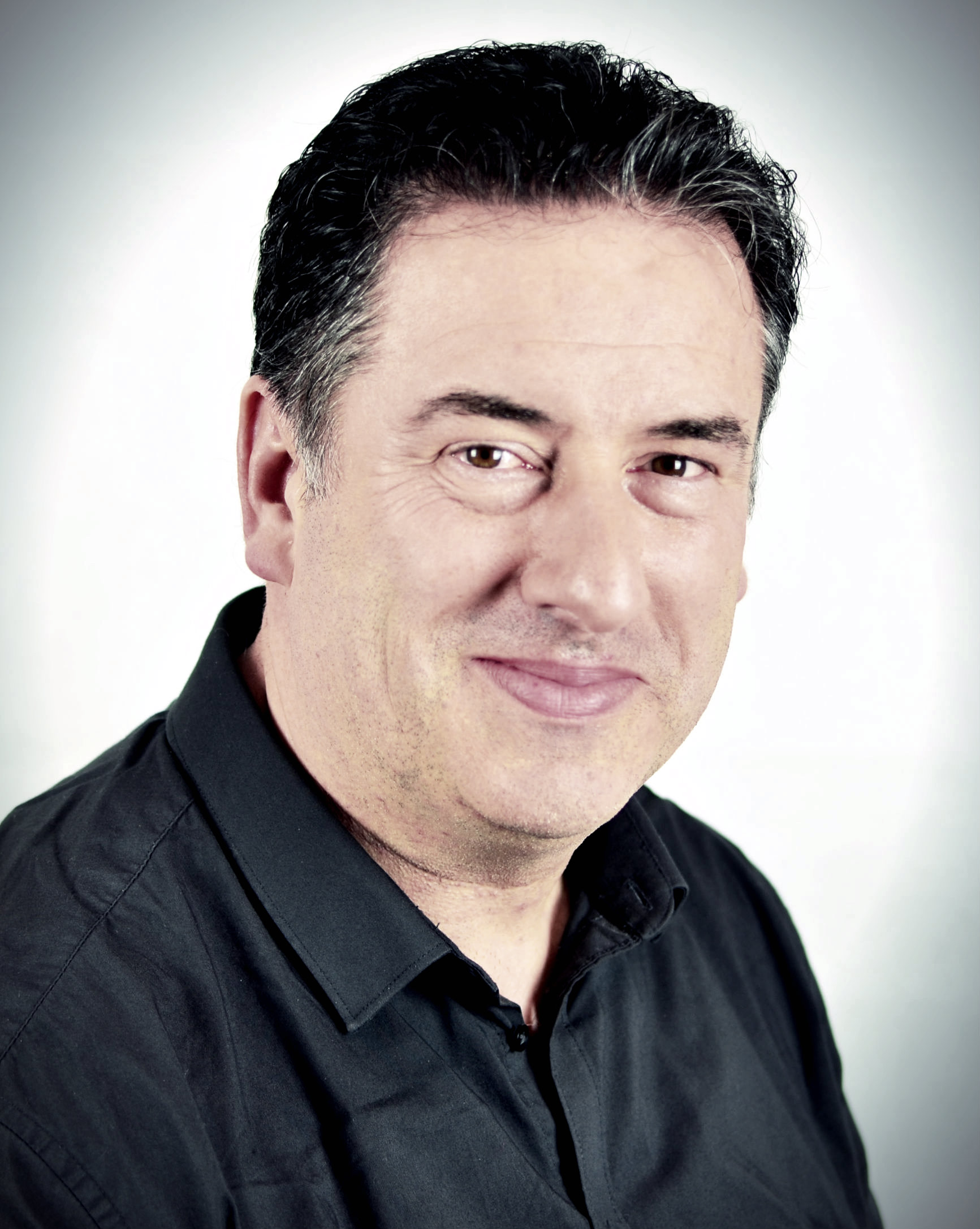
Fergal O'Byrne

Fergal O'Byrne is a writer from Dublin, Ireland who now lives in Copenhagen, Denmark. Two of his stage plays have won awards at Listowel Writers' Week.

== Career ==
Before turning to writing full-time, O'Byrne was CEO of the Irish Internet Association and was listed by that organisation in its "IIA Internet Hall of Fame".

After moving to Copenhagen, That Theatre Company agreed to stage a trilogy of plays by O'Byrne. The first play, Extremophiles, had its premiere in October 2020 in the Krudttønden Theatre, Copenhagen. A further play by O'Byrne, Rub-a-Dub-Dub, is due to be given its premiere in March 2022.

O'Byrne's screenwriting work includes the sitcom Hipsterverse. His short films include Eyes Wide Open, Ribeye (2016 Semi-Finalist PAGE International Screenwriting Awards), and Glass Ceiling (2014 Quarter-Finalist PAGE International Screenwriting Awards).

== Recognition ==
O'Byrne was a winner of the Hennessy Short Story writing awards, which led to the publication of his debut novel Trolley Ride in Manhattan (Mentor Books) in 2000.

His stage plays have won several awards, including A Dragon’s Tale (which won the Eamon Keane Award at the 2013 Listowel Writers' Week), and Extremophiles (which won the Eamon Keane Award in 2018).
