= Dublin Institute of Technology =

Former technical institution in Dublin, Ireland

Coordinates: 53°20′19″N 6°15′59″W

- Institiúid Teicneolaíochta Bhaile Átha Cliath
- Active: 1887 – foundation of City of Dublin Technical Schools; 1978 – under the auspices of Dublin City Council; 1992 – as an autonomous degree-awarding institution.–2019 – became part of Technological University Dublin
- Affiliations: EUA; IAU ELIA; SEFI; Association of MBAs; Dublin Chamber of Commerce; Campus Compact
- President: Professor Brian Norton
- Faculty: 2,500
- Students: 20,000
- Location: Grangegorman; Dublin 7, Dublin, Ireland
- Campus: Multiple locations in Dublin. Relocating to a single inner suburban campus.
- Colours: Blue, Beige,
- Website: dit.ie

Location of Grangegorman campus,
near central Dublin

Dublin Institute of Technology (DIT, Irish: Institiúid Teicneolaíochta Bhaile Átha Cliath) was a major third-level institution in Dublin, Ireland. On 1 January 2019 DIT was dissolved and its functions were transferred to the Technological University Dublin, as TU Dublin City Campus. The institution began with the establishment of the first technical education institution in Ireland, in 1887, and progressed through various legal and governance models, culminating in autonomy under a statute of 1992.

DIT was recognised particularly for degree programmes in Product Design, Mechanical Engineering, Architecture, Engineering, Science, Marketing, Hospitality, Music, Optometry, Pharmaceuticals, Construction, Digital Media and Journalism. It was ranked, in 2014, in Times Higher Education's top 100 university-level institutions globally under 50 years old.

Alumni of the Dublin Institute of Technology include a number of Irish writers, artists, politicians and business leaders as well as international figures in the fields of arts, architecture and business.

== History ==
=== Origins – Dublin's technical colleges ===
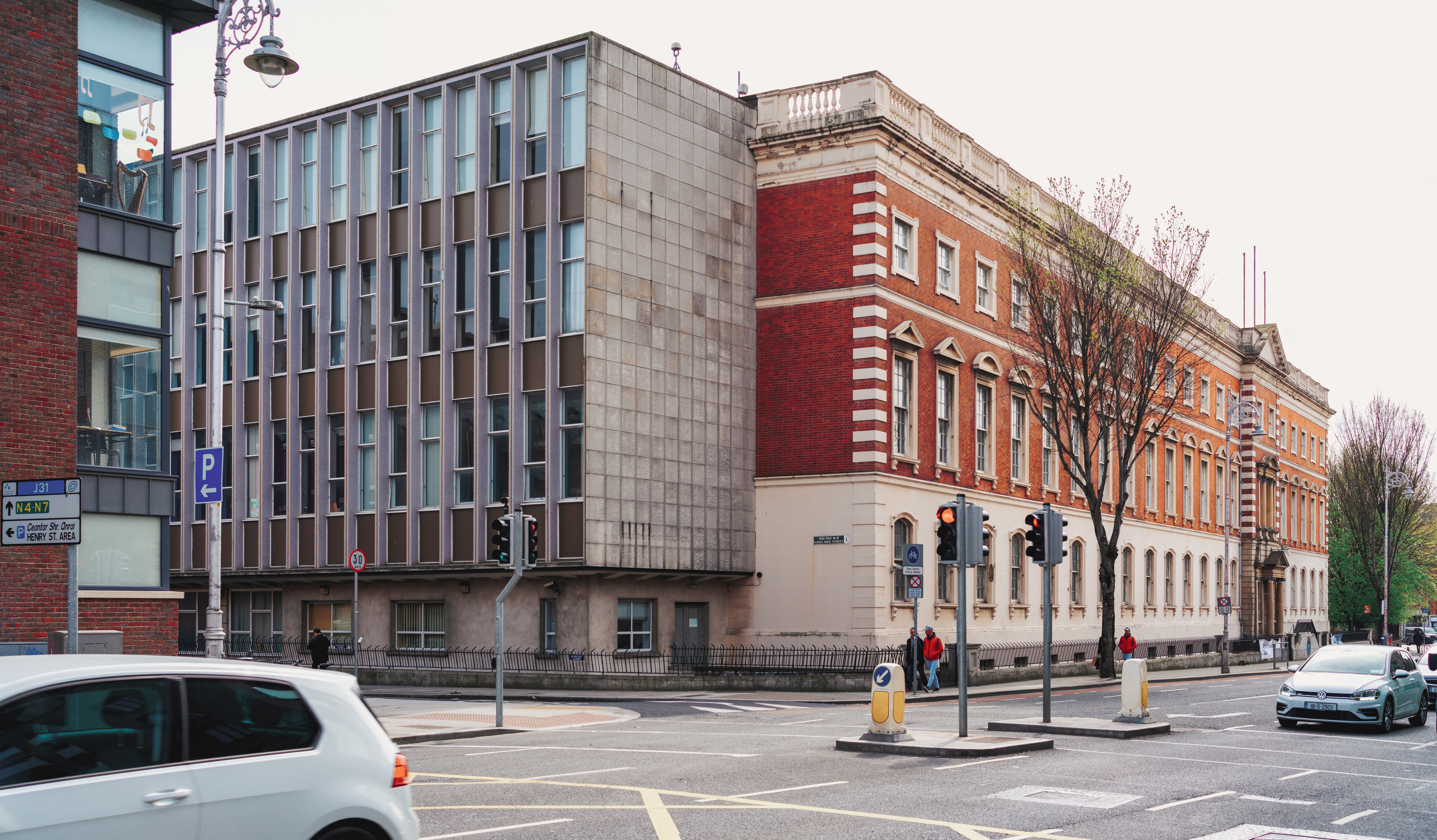
Bolton Street College

The first of DIT's predecessor colleges, the City of Dublin Technical Schools, was founded in 1887 by Arnold Felix Graves.

Over time, other specialised colleges opened, and those which later formed DIT are listed, each with its year of foundation:

- College of Technology, Kevin Street (1887)
- College of Music, Chatham Row (1890)
- College of Commerce, Rathmines (1901)
- College of Marketing and Design, Mountjoy Square (1905)
- College of Technology, Bolton Street (1911)
- College of Catering, Cathal Brugha Street (1941)

=== Federal model (1978–1992) ===
In 1978 the College of Technology joined with the other five institutions to form the Dublin Institute of Technology, a federation of colleges.

=== Unitary college model ===
In 1992, Dublin Institute of Technology was established by legislation as a single institution, under the Dublin Institute of Technology Act.

=== Towards university status ===
An application for university designation in 1996 was declined but with the expert panel viewing the institution as on a trajectory for university designation. Dublin Institute of Technology now has a scope of activities and variety of powers identical to those of a university, and its degrees are recognised as such both in Ireland and internationally. For twenty-five years, DIT had legislative authority to award Bachelor's, Master's and Doctoral degrees that comply fully with the Irish national qualifications framework originally put in place by the National Qualifications Authority of Ireland. DIT awarded Professorships from 2003.

=== Technological University status ===
In 2014, the institution entered into a formal process which led to its designation as a technological university, jointly with two other institutions, Institute of Technology, Blanchardstown (ITB) and Institute of Technology, Tallaght (ITT). A final application was submitted in April 2018 and the formation of the Technological University Dublin, "TU Dublin", was approved in July 2018. It was launched 1 January 2019.

=== Degree-awarding powers ===
In 1975 the University of Dublin entered into an agreement whereby it conferred academic degrees at the colleges that formed Dublin Institute of Technology; this allowed these graduates a vote in the Dublin University constituency for Seanad Éireann representatives. This continued until 1998, when Dublin Institute of Technology was granted its own autonomous degree-awarding powers under the Dublin Institute of Technology Act 1992.

== Academic structure ==
DIT's predecessor colleges were recognised as centres of excellence in their areas of specialism and, following the establishment of the unitary DIT, their expertise formed the nucleus of an internal structure comprising the following faculties and campuses:

- Faculty of Applied Arts, Mountjoy Square, Rathmines, Clarendon Row, Portland Row, Temple Bar
- Faculty of the Built Environment, Bolton Street and Linenhall
- Faculty of Business, Mountjoy Square and Rathmines, latterly Aungier Street
- Faculty of Engineering, Bolton Street, Kevin Street, Beresford Street
- Faculty of Science, Kevin Street
- Faculty of Tourism and Food, Cathal Brugha Street, Sackville Place and Kevin Street

From 2012 to 2018, DIT was organised into four colleges: Engineering and Built Environment, Business, Science and Health, and Arts and Tourism. These also contributed to the research activities of an overarching Graduate Research School and to four cross-institutional Research Institutes that brought together over seventy research centres and groups. The colleges in turn were divided into 27 Schools.

DIT also had various technology transfer and commercial units.

=== School of Computing ===
The DIT School of Computing is a school within the DIT.

The Faculty of Science at DIT first offered courses in computing in 1971. The original computing course was entitled "WMT (Wholetime Mathematical Technician)". With updates and additions over the following 30 years, this course evolved into the "BSc. (Honours) Degree in Computing" course (DT211). In 2001, the School of Computing was founded, as an independent school based at DIT's Kevin Street Campus, when it split from the DIT School of Mathematics, Statistics and Computing. At the time of its founding in 2001, there were twenty academic staff. As of 2008, this had increased to forty staff and approximately four hundred students. The School of Computing emphasised industry oriented education full-time and part-time undergraduate and postgraduate courses. The School of Computing had collaborations with other educational institutes, including the Harbin Institute of Technology in China.

== Governance ==
DIT had a governing body comprising representatives of public, including Dublin Lord Mayors (such as formerly Maurice Ahern and Mary Freehill), social and industrial groups, faculty, staff and students, its final composition was chaired by Professor Tom Collins.

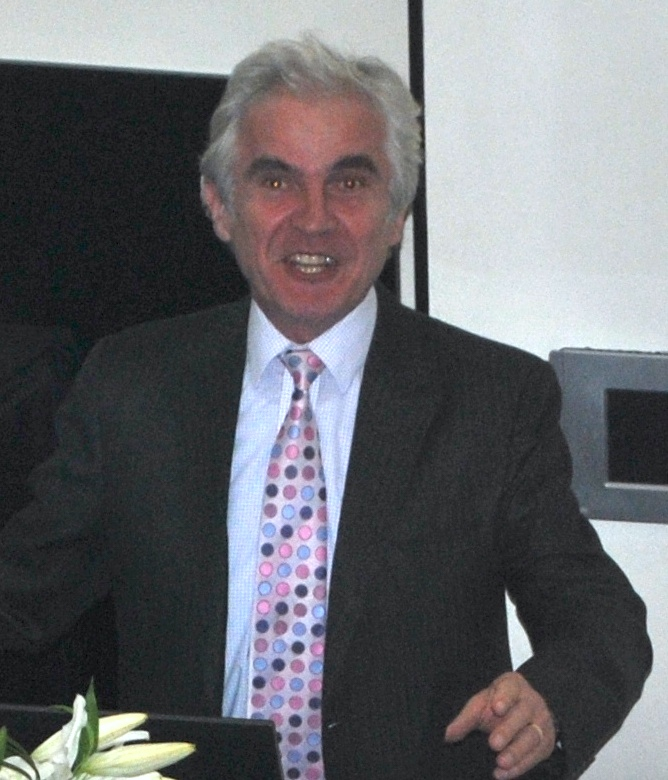
Professor Tom Collins, former president of RCSI-Bahrain

In 1992 Michael O'Donnell became the first interim president. He was succeeded as president in 1993 by Professor Brendan Goldsmith. From 2003 to 2018 Professor Brian Norton was the second, and last, president.

== Faculty ==
Faculty included David Brophy, conductor, Gráinne Mulvey, composer, Bernie Sherlock, conductor, Jane O'Leary, pianist and composer, John Feeley, guitarist, Kieran Hanrahan, traditional Irish musician, Mike Nielsen, jazz guitarist and composer, Ciarán Cuffe, urban planner, Mairtin Mac Con Iomaire, culinary arts.

Previous faculty members included Pat Kenny, Raidió Teilifís Éireann (RTÉ and Newstalk) news and current affairs presenter, Joan Burton, Teachta Dála (TD), Minister for Social Protection, Frank Harte, Irish traditional singer and architect, Hugh McFadden, poet, Seán Dublin Bay Rockall Loftus, politician, Brid Grant, Dean of Arts, University of Connecticut, Desmond Fennell, writer and cultural philosopher, Lelia Doolan, TV and film producer, Peter Sutherland, lawyer and politician. John T. Lewis, mathematician and physicist and Bernadette Greevy, mezzo-soprano.

== Research ==
Dedicated research facilities include the Focas Research Institute with extensive spectroscopy, microscopy and holography facilities. It also houses "CREST"; an international centre supported by Enterprise Ireland for paint and surface coating development. Antennae research is associated with the multi-institution "CTVR"; The Centre for Telecommunications Value-added Research. Recently research supported by Science Foundation Ireland in the Dublin Energy Lab, water sciences, air quality, food preservation and environmental health and safety are being co-located in a major new building at the Grangegorman new city centre campus together with an additional "Hothouse" start-up business incubator for new DIT spin-off companies. Hothouse nurtured, amongst other firms, Smart Wall Paint and Moletest.

=== National Optometry Centre ===
The National Optometry Centre (NOC) located at the junction of Kevin Street and New Bride Street is the only such centre in Ireland. The main function of the NOC is to facilitate clinical training for Optometry students. The centre is developing specialised clinics in areas such as paediatrics, low vision and contact lenses. It was planned to also offer eye examinations, spectacles and contact lenses to the general public. Free eye examinations are offered to DIT students.

== Partnerships ==
In common with other Irish universities, DIT validates programmes taught in other institutions in Dublin such as Pulse College, based in the Windmill Lane Studios, and the British and Irish Modern Music Institute BA programme.

There are student exchange and joint research programmes with several universities in India, China, Brazil, Australia, the US and Europe. DIT are also partners in the Mozambique Eyecare Project. As part of the project, an undergraduate course in Optometry was established at Universidade Lurio, Nampula. The first of its kind in Mozambique. Other partners on the project are University of Ulster and International Centre for Eyecare Education. There are also links with Darmstadt University of Applied Sciences across several subjects, with Columbia College Chicago in design and media and with Purdue University across a number of disciplines including a joint master's degree programme. There are student and staff exchanges with Grenoble School of Management. DIT accredits programmes at Middle East College in Oman.

== Ranking ==
Dublin Institute of Technology was named "Best Institute of Technology" in 2010, 2016 and 2018 by the Sunday Times. It came 94th in the 2014 and 2015 Times Higher Education 100 under 50 Ranking of universities worldwide. It came 157th in the UI Greenmetric Ranking of World Universities in 2013. The 2012, QS World University Rankings puts DIT in the 451–500 bracket worldwide and in the 350th position for Engineering & Technology; DIT's best result in the same ranking was when it came 326th in the worldwide ranking in 2009.

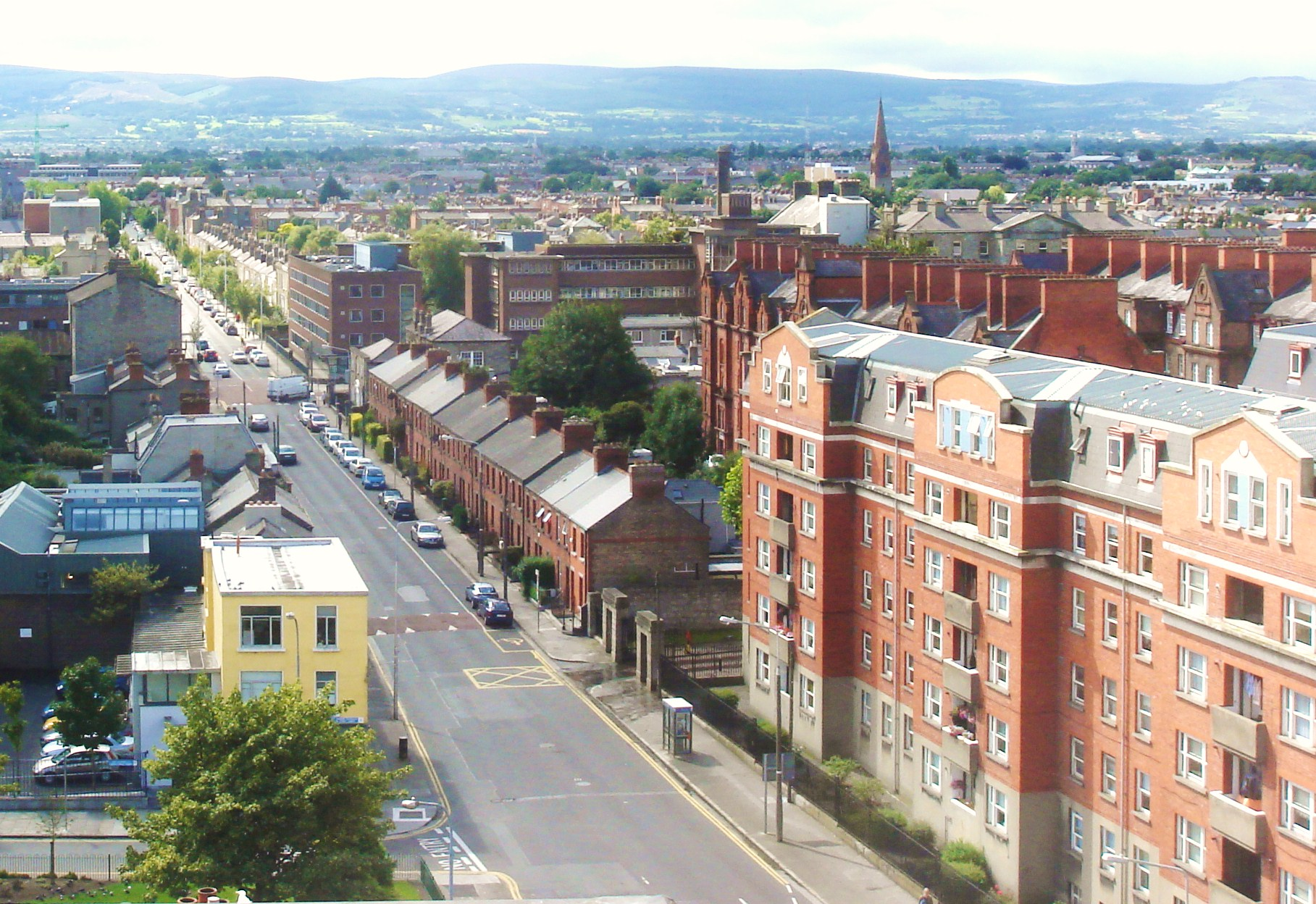
The yellow building is public clinic of the NOC

== Community outreach ==
Embedded in the life of Dublin city centre, DIT had several links with its neighbouring communities and schools. The Access and Civic Engagement service provided programmes that enabled those from traditionally under-represented groups to study at DIT. These included a number of access routes for children in secondary schools where there had been no tradition of continuing to third level education. It also made even earlier interventions in schools, for example the 'Pathways through Education' supports students in making the transition into secondary school.

== Campus ==
Dublin Institute of Technology is spread across 10 locations in Dublin city, which are currently being amalgamated into a central campus at Grangegorman.

=== Grangegorman Campus ===
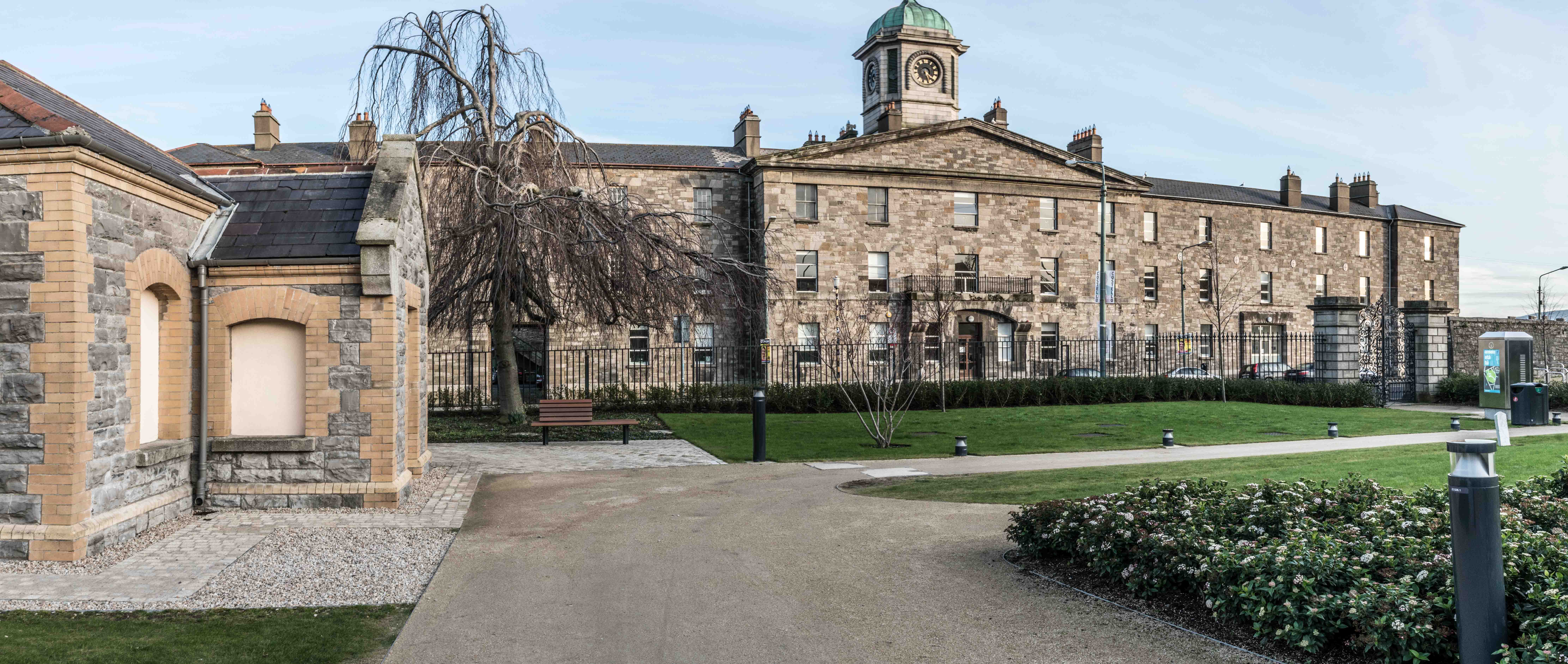
Dublin Institute of Technology, Grangegorman Campus

The Institute plans to consolidate to a single campus in the centre of Dublin, at Grangegorman. The campus is located 1 km from O'Connell Street, with Smithfield to the south; Stoneybatter to the west; Broadstone to the east; and Phibsboro and the North Circular Road to the north. As of 2014, the Grangegorman campus was home to students in Fine Art, Product Design, Visual Communications, Photography and Social Sciences. The development of the new consolidated city-centre campus is undertaken by the Grangegorman Development Agency.

The campus is served by the Luas (Green Line) and the closest station is Grangegorman. An adjacent station, DIT Broadstone, is also operational.

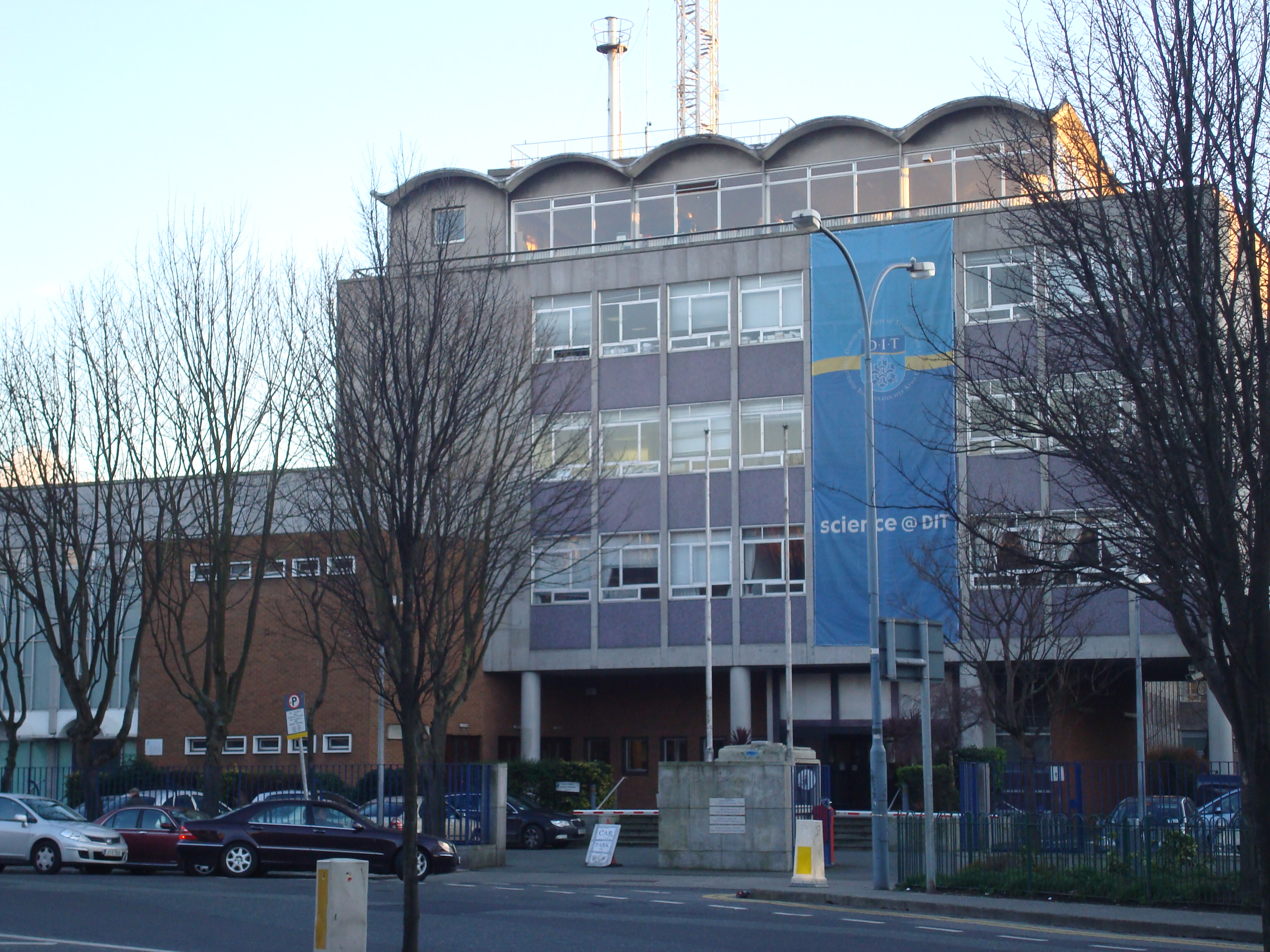
DIT's Kevin St building; home to most science and health programmes, the School of Electrical and Electronic Engineering and the DIT School of Computing.

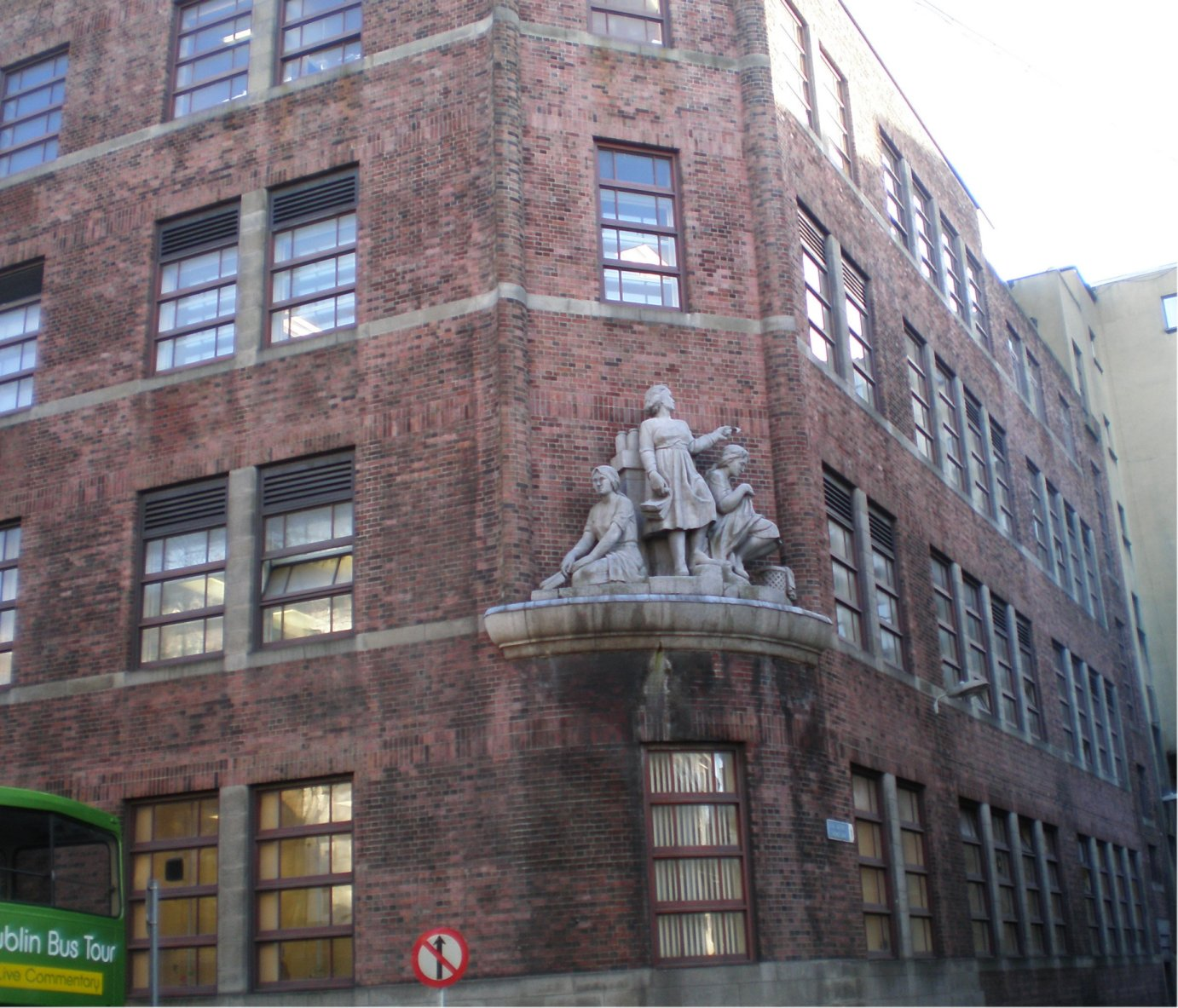
DIT's Cathal Brugha St building; home to hospitality and culinary programmes including the DIT School of Culinary Arts and Food Technology, in the photograph can be seen the sculpture of "The Three Graces" by Gabriel Hayes

== Students ==
Dublin Institute of Technology had circa 20,000 students.

=== Students' Union ===
The DIT Students' Union (DITSU) was the representative body for students in DIT. It was set up to "ensure there is a student voice at each level within the college" and all students within the institute were automatically members. DITSU, which was a member of the Union of Students in Ireland, also promoted clubs, societies and other non-academic activities and provided a range of services for its members. The union also had representation in the governance of DIT and, under the 1994 DIT Amendment Act, the membership of DIT's governing body was expanded to include two students (one male and one female). DITSU's website won a "Best Students' Union Website" award in 2012.

When, in January 2019, DIT joined with ITB and ITT to form Dublin Technical University, a member referendum was held. The referendum was passed and, in February 2019, DITSU was joined under a new constitution (with the equivalent unions in ITB and ITT) to form the Technological University Dublin Students' Union (TUDSU).

=== Sport ===
As of 2014, DIT had more than 40 student clubs, including Gaelic Athletic Association, football, handball, rifle shooting, waterpolo, archery, basketball, kite surfing and cricket.

In 2013, Dublin Institute of Technology won the Sigerson Cup, the premier Gaelic Football Championship among Irish Higher Education institutions. DIT's hurlers won the Kehoe Cup in 2007 and the Walsh Cup Shield in 2013.

Outdoor and indoor sports facilities were developed at Grangegorman and at Broom Bridge.

== See also ==
- Education in the Republic of Ireland
- List of higher education institutions in the Republic of Ireland
- Grangegorman Development Agency
