= Cathal Brugha Street =

Street in Dublin, Ireland

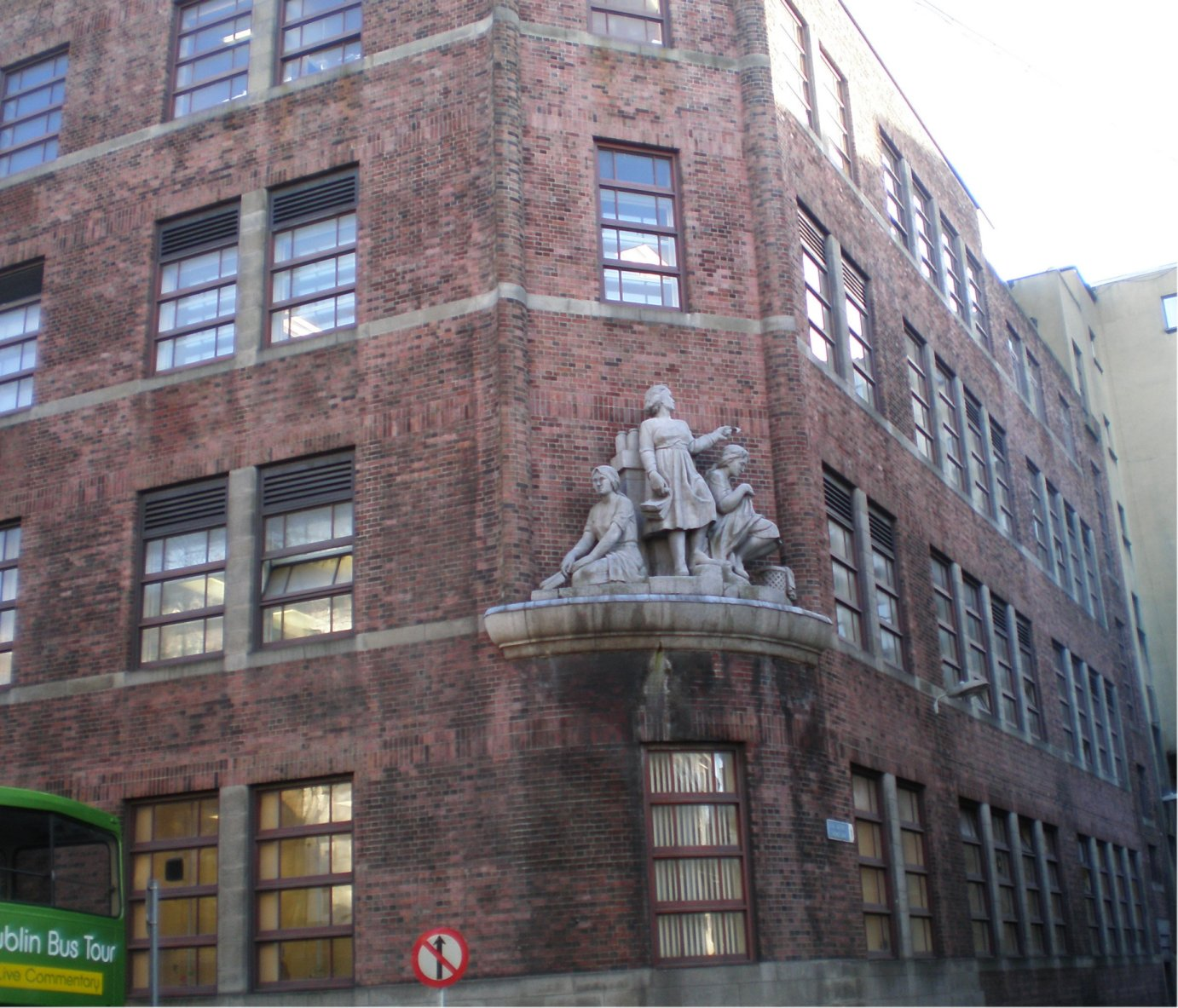
- Dublin Institute of Technology building on Cathal Brugha Street

- Location within Central Dublin
- Native name: Sráid Chathal Brugha (Irish)
- Former names: Gregg Lane, Gregg's Lane
- Namesake: Cathal Brugha
- Length: 250 m (820 ft)
- Width: 22 metres (72 ft)
- Location: Dublin, Ireland
- Postal code: D01
- Coordinates: 53.352378°N 6.259097°W
- west end: O'Connell Street Upper
- east end: Cumberland Street North, Seán McDermott Street

Other
- Known for: DIT Cathal Brugha Street

Cathal Brugha Street (/ˌkɒhəl ˈbruːə/ Irish: Sráid Chathal Brugha) is a street on the northside of Dublin, Ireland.

== Location ==
The street runs eastwards from near the Parnell Square end of Upper O'Connell Street, crossing Marlborough Street and changing name to Seán Macdermott Street Upper at the junction with Cumberland Street North and Champions Avenue.

== Creation and name ==
The original Cathal Brugha Street was the section west of Marlborough Street, which was created as part of the reconstruction of Dublin after the damage of the Irish revolutionary period of 1916–23, which destroyed much of the vicinity. The pre-existing Findlater Place (originally Gregg's Lane) ran at an angle between O'Connell Street and Marlborough Street, to the north of St. Thomas's Church of Ireland church, which fronted on Marlborough Street and was destroyed in the revolution. The new street was at right angles to O'Connell Street and Marlborough Street, intersecting the north-east stub of Findlater Place, and running south of the rebuilt St. Thomas Church to align with Gloucester Street (renamed Seán McDermott Street in 1932 after one of the names used by Seán Mac Diarmada).

Originally the street had no official name, because Dublin Corporation was dissolved in 1924 and replaced by unelected commissioners. During the Civil War, anti-Treaty leader Cathal Brugha had been shot and wounded on Thomas Lane, off O'Connell Street, dying days later in hospital. The unofficial name "Cathal Brugha Street" gained currency with locals. It was officially adopted by the revived Corporation in 1932.

In 1992, the next block east of Marlborough Street was redesignated from Seán McDermott Street to Cathal Brugha Street by the Corporation, after a plebiscite of local ratepayers. The abutting plots were derelict and Seán McDermott Street was a byword for urban deprivation and crime; it was hoped the rename would aid urban renewal investment, and a private apartment block was built on the renamed section, named "Gresham House" after the Gresham Hotel on O'Connell Street.

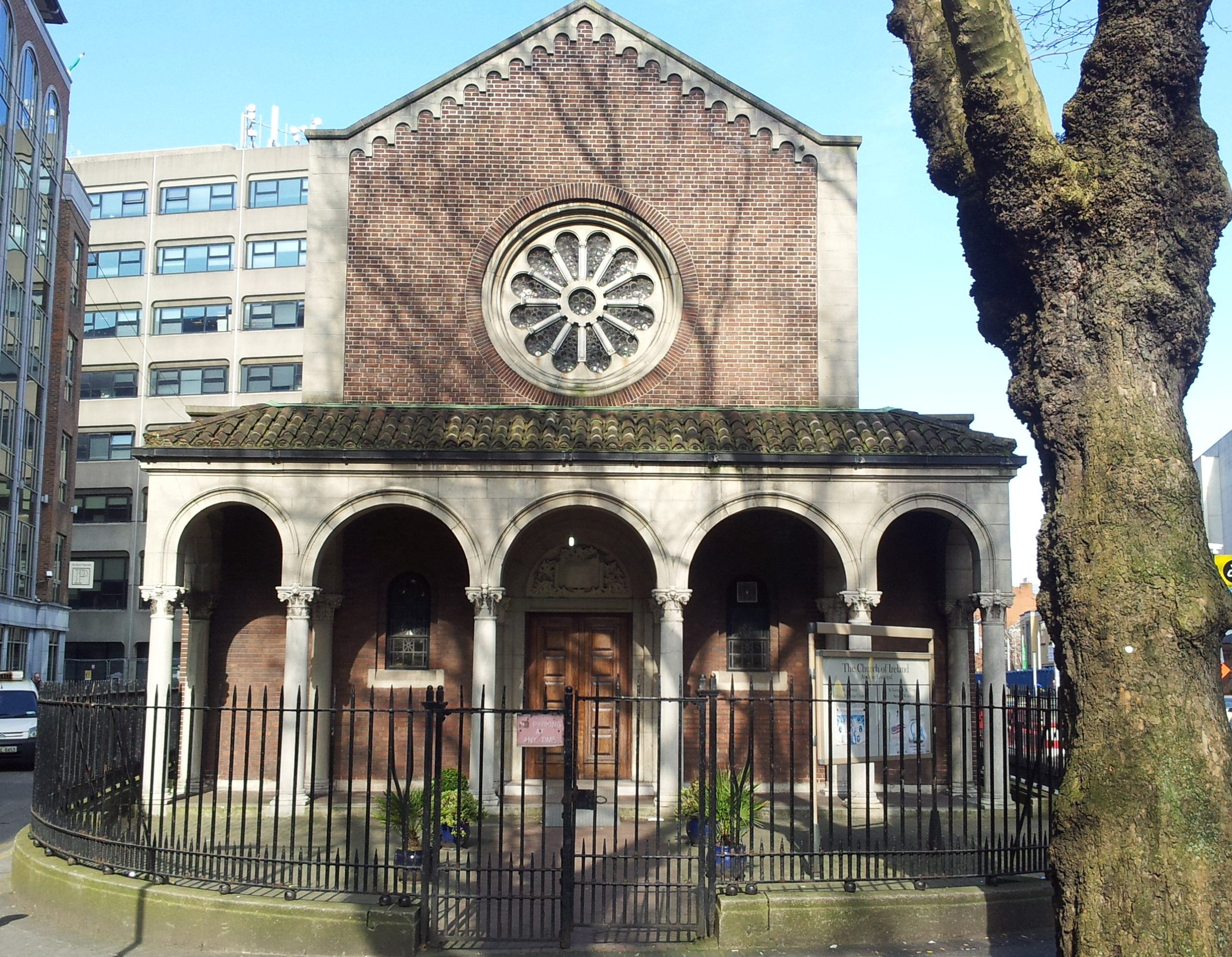
St. Thomas church

== Landmarks ==
Among the post-1923 buildings, the new Anglican St. Thomas Church designed by W. Hicks was the winner of the Royal Institute of the Architects of Ireland Gold Medal for Architecture 1932-34.

The street is best known as the location of DIT School of Culinary Arts and Food Technology, formerly the College of Catering, and widely referred to simply as "Cathal Brugha Street". It was designed by Robinson and Keefe Architects as an Institute for Women's work, and incorporates many of the features used in their earlier Technical School and Library in Marino Mart, Fairview. The sculpture at the corner of the building nearest O'Connell Street by Hayes, shows women displaying the skills learned in the College, such as knitting. DIT put the building up for sale at €20m in 2016 in preparation for moving to its Grangegorman Development Agency campus. Larkin Community College is also located on Cathal Brugha Street.
