= Kilkenny cats =

Two cats who fought leaving only their tails

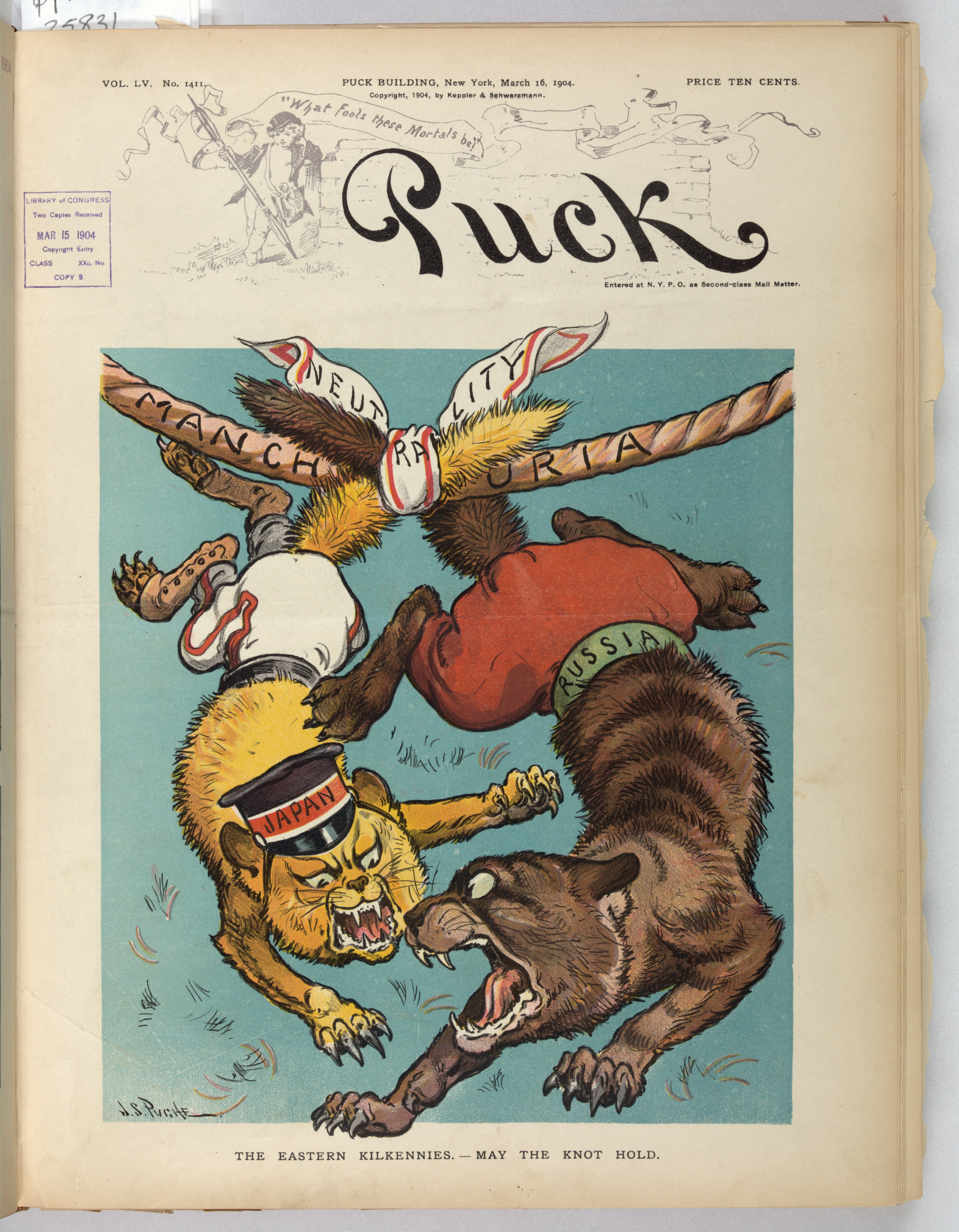
"The Eastern Kilkennies — may the knot hold": Puck (1904) hopes the Russo-Japanese War in Manchuria will debilitate both Japan and Russia

The Kilkenny cats are a fabled pair of cats from County Kilkenny (or Kilkenny city in particular) in Ireland, who fought each other so ferociously that only their tails remained at the end of the battle. Often the absurd implication is that they have eaten each other. In the nineteenth century the Kilkenny cats were a common simile for any conflict likely to ruin both combatants. Kilkenny cat is also used more generally for a fierce fighter or quarrelsome person. These senses are now rather dated. In the later twentieth century the motif was reclaimed by Kilkenny people as a positive symbol of tenacity and fighting spirit, and "the Cats" is the county nickname for the Kilkenny hurling team. The original story is attested from 1807 as a simple joke or Irish bull; some early versions are set elsewhere than Kilkenny. Nevertheless, theories have been offered seeking a historical basis for the story's setting.

== Versions of the story ==
The earliest attested version of the story is from June 1807, in Anthologia, a collection of jokes and humorous pieces copied by "W.T." of Inner Temple from unnamed previous publications. Steven Connor characterises the story as an Irish bull. Under the heading "Kilkenny Cats" it runs:

In a company, consisting of naval officers, the discourse happened to turn on the ferocity of small animals; when an Irish gentleman present stated his opinion to be, that a Kilkenny cat, of all animals, was the most ferocious; and added, "I can prove my assertion, by a fact within my own knowledge:— I once," said he, "saw two of these animals fighting in a timber yard, and willing to see the result of a long battle, I drove them into a deep sawpit, and placing some boards over the mouth, left them to their amusement. Next morning I went to see the conclusion of the fight, and what d'ye think I saw?"– "One of the cats dead, probably," —replied one of the company.— "No by Ja—s! (Note: "by Ja—s" is a censored version of "by Jasus", itself a pronunciation respelling of "by Jesus" in Hiberno-English.) there was nothing left in the pit, but the two tails and a bit of flue! (Note: "flue" = "Light down, such as rises from cotton, fur, etc.; very fine lint or hair".)"

The tale was repeated verbatim the next month in The European Magazine's review of Anthologia, as well as The Sporting Magazine, also in London, and Walker's Hibernian Magazine in Dublin. It reappeared in 1812 in Thomas Tegg's The Spirit of Irish Wit, and in the 1813 supplement to William Barker Daniel's Rural Sports.

The following appears in Thomas Gilliland's The Trap, an 1808 satire on the theme of love:

When I was last at Kilkenny, said Teague, I saw two big ram-cats fight a duel for love, your honour; and they fought, and fought, till they ate each other up. Devil burn me, if I lie, your honour! I went after them into the gutter! "Tommy!" says I, "my dear Phely!" says I, but no Tommy or Phely was there: I found only the tips of their tails.

An 1811 joke book from Boston in the United States included:

On a gentleman's reading an account of a tiger fight in the East Indies, an Irishman present exclaimed: 'a tiger be hang'd! Why, sir, I once myself saw two Kilkenny cats fight till they devoured each other up, excepting the very tips of their two tails.'

Another version is alluded to in an 1816 critique of a pamphlet by Andrew O'Callaghan, master of Kilkenny College:

There is a story told in Kilkenny, that several cats had been locked up in a room, for a fortnight together, without food, and, upon opening the door, there was nothing found but the tail of one of them. Surely Mr. O'C. must have been dreaming of this native story, when he made his arguments thus to swallow themselves, after destroying each other—but the tail of one of them remains

Responding to the 1816 critique, Rowley Lascelles, an English antiquarian based in Ireland, denied the existence of such a story, which he saw as a slur on Kilkenny.

Although in 1835 John Neal called the story "one of the oldest and most undoubted Joe [Miller]s", the first edition of Joe Miller's Jests to include it was in 1836 (verbatim from Anthologia). Theodore Hook's 1837 novel Jack Brag jocularly sources the story to [Joe] Miller's History of Ireland.

=== Elsewhere than Kilkenny ===
An 1817 memoir of the Irish wit John Philpot Curran situates the story in Sligo rather than Kilkenny, as a tall tale told by Curran:

Passing his first summer at Cheltenham (Note: Curran was in Cheltenham in 1810 if not earlier.) ... he had resort to a story to draw himself into notice. ... The conversation of the table turning altogether on the stupid, savage, and disgusting amusement of cock-fighting, he was determined to put an end to it, (Note: It is unclear whether Curran sought to put an end to the topic of conversation or to cock-fighting in general.) by the incredible story of the Sligo cats.

At [a cat-fight meeting in Sligo] three matches were fought on the first day ... and before the third of them was finished (on which bets ran very high), dinner was announced in the inn where the battle was fought. The company agreed ... to lock up the room, leaving the key in trust to Mr. Curran, who protested to God, he never was so shocked, that his head hung heavy on his shoulders, and his heart was sunk within him, on entering with the company into the room, and finding that the cats had actually eaten each other up, save some little bits of tails which were scattered round the room.

The Irish part of the company saw the drift, ridicule, and impossibility of the narrative, and laughed immoderately, while the English part yawned and laughed, seeing others laugh, and sought relief in each other's countenances.

In Real life in Ireland, an 1821 stage Irish novel by Pierce Egan, Captain Grammachree, a retired soldier, tells Brian Boru, a young country squire, of a cat-fight in the neighbourhood of Dublin:

'There was hundreds betted, but not a cross won or lost; for by Jasus! they left nothing on the ground but a bunch of hair and two tails!'
'What!' said Brian, 'then I suppose the cats ran away?'
'An Irish cat run away!' sneered Grammachree, 'no; never! by the powers of Moll Kelly! they eat one another up!'

An 1830 "dialogue on Popery" by one Jacob Stanley summarises "the Travellers tale of the Irish Cat fight", giving no specific location.

=== The battle of the cats of Ireland ===
S. Redmond in 1864 in Notes and Queries recounted a tale told to him "more than thirty years" earlier when he was "very young" by "a Kilkenny gentleman", about a battle "some forty years before" [i.e. about 1790] on "a plain near that ancient city":

One night, in the summer time, all the cats in the city and county of Kilkenny, were absent from their "local habitations;" and next morning, the plain alluded to (I regret I have not the name) was found covered with thousands of slain tabbies; and the report was, that almost all the cats in Ireland had joined in the contest; as many of the slain had collars on their necks, which showed that they had collected from all quarters of the island. The cause of the quarrel, however, was not stated; but it seemed to have been a sort of provincial faction fight between the cats of Ulster and Leinster—probably the quadrupeds took up the quarrels of their masters, as at that period there was very ill feeling between the people of both provinces.

Although Redmond states "This has nothing to do with the story of the two famous Kilkenny cats", the two have occasionally been linked subsequently. A similar story was told in Charles Henry Ross' 1867 Book of Cats, to which Kilkenny antiquarian John G. A. Prim responded that he had heard such a story told of many places in Ireland, but not of Kilkenny. In 1863, Once A Week had a story of a similar battle in Yorkshire. Folklorist John O'Hanlon in 1898 published a version from John Kearns of Irishtown, Dublin which situated the battle on Scald Hill in Sandymount, the future site of Star of the Sea Catholic Church, witnessed by curate Father Corrigan. In the 1930s, the Irish Folklore Commission noted a seanchaí from Rossinver, County Leitrim, tell of a cat battle in Locan Dhee near Kinlough on New Year's Day 1855.

== Use as a simile ==
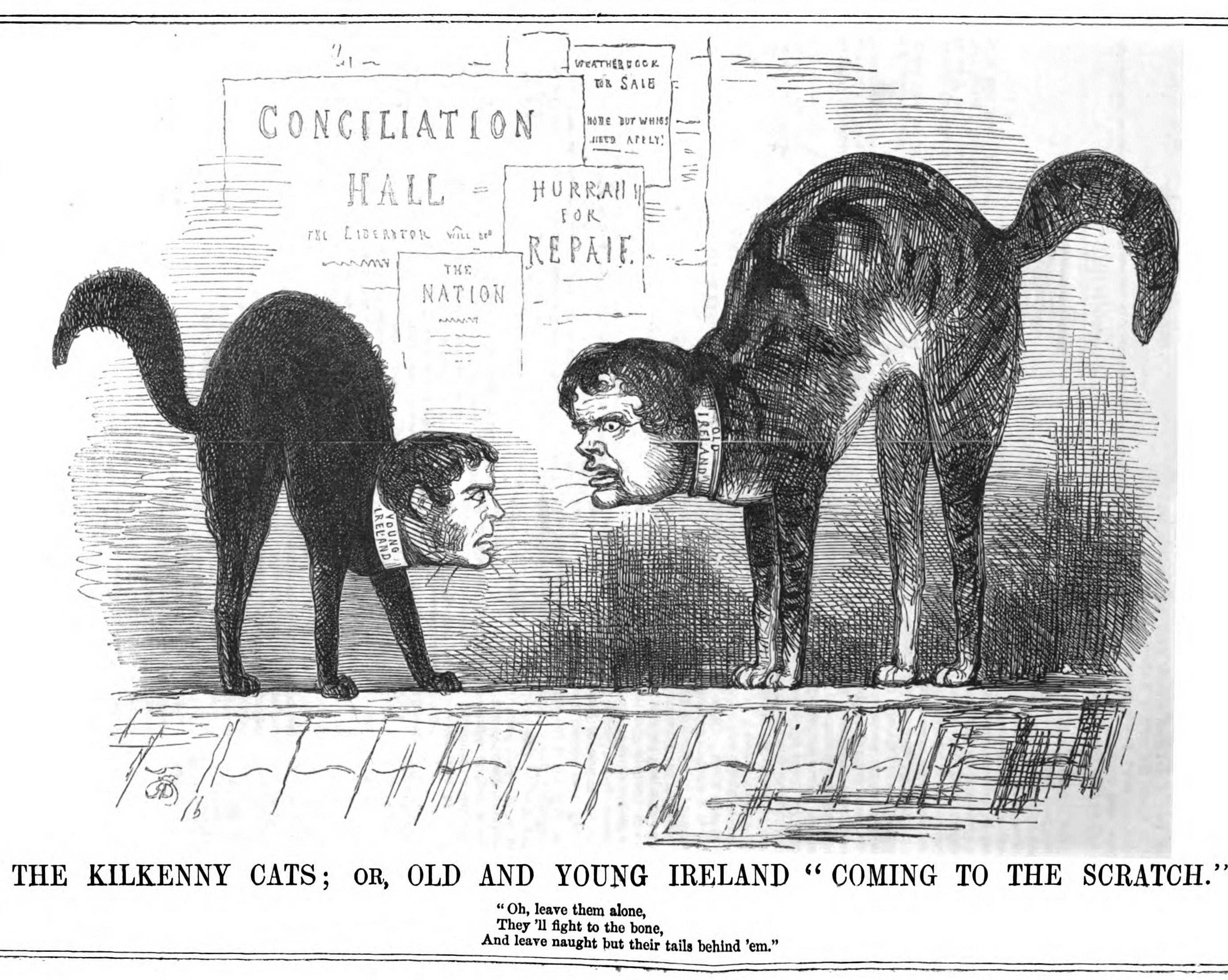
'The Kilkenny Cats; or, Old and Young Ireland "coming to the scratch."' (Punch, 1846) — caricature of William Smith O'Brien and Daniel O'Connell.

The story was sufficiently well known in the 19th century to be used frequently as a simile for "combatants who fight until they annihilate each other"; to "fight like [the] Kilkenny cats" means "to engage in a mutually destructive struggle". Early instances include: (from 1814) an account in Niles' Register of the loss of USS Wasp after sinking HMS Avon; (from 1816) the critique of Andrew O'Callaghan mentioned earlier; a letter from the 4th Duke of Buccleuch to Walter Scott comparing Lord Byron's poem "Darkness" to the story; and a riposte to disagreeing literary critics:

Indeed, so mortal is your reciprocal hostility, that your victims may, with Mercutio, form the reasonable expectation, that, being, 'two such, we shall have none shortly, for one will kill the other;' and like the celebrated Kilkenny cats, leave no other vestige to designate the tribe of ferae naturae to which you belong, than an odd tooth or a claw!

One context for the simile was advocating isolationism, allowing one's enemies to defeat each other, or a divide-and-conquer policy. A report in Niles' Register of Spanish church opposition to the 1817 tax reform of Martín de Garay wished 'the fate of the "Kilkenny cats"' on "Ferdinand and his priests". Similarly Charles Napier in 1823 hoped "the French and Spaniards [would] war like Kilkenny cats"; likewise Figaro in London in 1832 urging British neutrality after the Ten Days' Campaign and Charles Darwin in 1833 in Buenos Aires during the Revolution of the Restorers. J. S. Pughe in a 1904 political cartoon in Puck depicted Japan and Russia as Kilkenny cats fighting the Russo-Japanese War in Manchuria. Similarly in 1941, after Germany invaded the Soviet Union, Clifford Berryman depicted Adolf Hitler and Joseph Stalin as "a modern version of the Kilkenny Cats". In The German Ideology, Karl Marx and Friedrich Engels accuse Bruno Bauer of fomenting antagonism between Max Stirner and Ludwig Feuerbach "as the two Kilkenny cats in Ireland". (Note: German wie die beiden Katzen von Kilkenny in Irland)

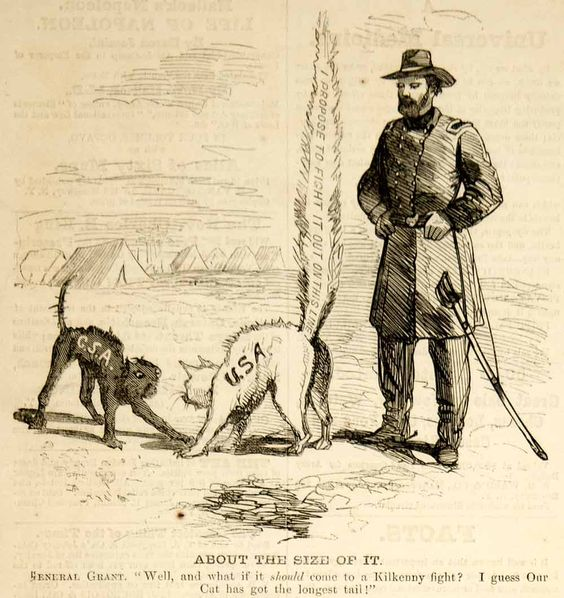
"About the Size of it" (Harper's Weekly, 1864) — General Grant. "Well, and what if it should come to a Kilkenny fight? I guess Our Cat has got the longest tail!"

Conversely, the fable serves as a cautionary tale for the moral "united we stand, divided we fall". It was invoked in 1827, in The Lancet during disputes around the Royal College of Physicians; and in The Literary Gazette of the rivalry between Drury Lane and Covent Garden theatres. It was a common metaphor before and during the American Civil War, a conflict seen as likely to destroy both sides; especially when criticising the war of attrition strategy of Ulysses S. Grant. Some extended the metaphor to say the North would win as having the longest tail; this was popularly reported in 1864 as a quip by Grant, but George Gordon Meade made the same comparison in an 1861 letter to his wife. Some Mormons viewed the Civil War as fulfilling a prophecy by founder Joseph Smith, who said after an 1843 attempt to arrest him, "The constitution of the United States declares that the privilege of the writ of habeas corpus shall not be denied. Deny me the writ of habeas corpus, and I will fight with gun, sword, cannon, whirlwind, and thunder, until they are used up like the Kilkenny cats." Donald Dewar, the then First Minister of Scotland, in 1999 denied media talk of a rift with John Reid, the Scottish Secretary, conceding, "I must confess the casual outsider who simply read the headlines might think it was a collection of Kilkenny cats fighting". In the Supreme Court of India in December 2018, K. K. Venugopal, the Attorney General, justified the government's suspension of Alok Verma and Rakesh Asthana from the Central Bureau of Investigation by saying, "The government was watching with amazement the director and his deputy fight like Kilkenny cats." Indian media explained the simile in their reports on the case.

It was invoked in 1837 for political gridlock in divided legislatures: by Thomas Corwin in the 24th Congress, and by Thomas Carlyle in The French Revolution: A History. James Grant (1837, 1843) and S. Gerlis (2001) draw analogy with litigants who are both ruined by legal costs. It was often used in accounts of factionalism within Irish nationalist politics, such as between the Repeal Association and Young Ireland in the 1840s, Isaac Butt against Joseph Biggar in the 1870s, or the Parnell split of the 1890s. Francis Jacox invoked the Kilkenny cats in 1865 when enumerating "Certain Eligible Cases of Mutual Extermination" in Bentley's Miscellany. Prosper Mérimée alluded to les chats de Kilkenny in 1860s correspondence, (Note: Writing to Anthony Panizzi, in relation to the battles of Fredericksburg (1863) and Sadowa (1866).) prompting a query to L'Intermédiaire des chercheurs et curieux in 1904, the answer to which was prefaced, "Those of us who ever had an English governess will recall the 'Kilkenny Cats'." In his diary in 1950, Ernest Bevin, the UK Foreign Secretary, described the UK's Cold-War security links to the US as being "tied to the tail of a Kilkenny cat".

A lone Kilkenny cat may be invoked to symbolise ferocity or vigour without the implication of mutual destruction. In an 1825 humorous verse, Anthony Bleecker, inquiring into the cause of death of a peaceable cat, asks: "Did some Kilkenny cat make thee a ghost?" John Galt in 1826 refers to "an enormous tiger almost as big as a Kilkenny cat". In an 1840 story by Edgar Allan Poe, "Sir Pathrick O'Grandison, Barronitt, of Connacht" says he was "mad as a Kilkenny cat" when a rival came to court his beloved. In George Lippard's 1843 satire of Philadelphia publishers, Irishman Phelix Phelligrim exclaims, when his associates are cursing and red-faced with anger, "Its in a fine humor ye are, gentleman! The Kilkenny cats was a mere circumstance to ye!" Leo Richard Ward in 1939 described someone as "contrary and mean as a Kilkenny cat". In 2009, a Children's Court magistrate in Sydney described a schoolgirl arrested for fighting as a "Kilkenny cat".

=== Reclaimed ===
Irish counties have nicknames, some long established and in general use, others invented by sports journalists covering inter-county Gaelic games. The Kilkenny county team, (Note: Kilkenny city is nicknamed "the Marble City" (from Kilkenny Marble) and "Ye Faire Citie" (the motto under its coat of arms).) which has won more All-Ireland Senior Hurling Championships than any other county, has been called "the Cats" in newspapers since at least the 1980s.

In 1998 a man in Clark County, Washington, changed his surname from "Kenny" to "Kilkenny", reversing a change his great-grandfather had made to avoid the fighting stereotype associated with the name "Kilkenny" in the United States.

== Origin theories ==
The simplest theory for the story is that it is merely an Irish joke or Irish bull, and that the selection of Kilkenny as opposed to somewhere else in Ireland is arbitrary, perhaps favoured by the alliteration of the phrase "Kilkenny cats". John G. A. Prim in Notes and Queries in 1850 conceded that this was the most commonly accepted theory ("This ludicrous anecdote has, no doubt, been generally looked upon as an absurdity of the Joe Miller class"). La Belle Assemblée in 1823 credited Curran (for Kilkenny rather than Sligo). As regards the age of the story, Prim in 1868 wrote:

Thirty years ago I made inquiries amongst the "oldest inhabitants" of my acquaintance then living, and their unanimous testimony was, that the story of the Kilkenny cats was in vogue as long as they could remember, and the recollections of some of them extended to nearly half a century before [1798].

Rowley Lascelles claimed the 1816 version of the story was "taken from another, a well-known one, which is shortly this. Into a kennel of hounds, a dog of another species, did, one night, accidentally make its way. In the morning nothing was found of him but his tail." In the Histoire Naturelle (1758), Buffon describes how twelve unfed captive field mice ate each other, the survivor having mutilated legs and tail.

Prim proposed that the cats were originally an allegory for continual jurisdictional disputes between the adjacent municipal corporations of Kilkenny (or Englishtown, or Hightown) and Irishtown (or Saint Canice, or Newcourt). (Note: The two boroughs and corporations were replaced in 1843 by a single borough and corporation named Kilkenny, under the Municipal Corporations (Ireland) Act 1840.) Prim claimed that "mutual litigations, squabbles, assaults and batteries, with the accompanying imprisonments, fines and law costs", which brought both near to bankruptcy, lasted from 1377 to "the end of the seventeenth century". He claimed to have a paper on "the natural history of the Kilkenny cats" in preparation, and cited a Close Roll entry from the Irish Chancery for the 1377 date. (The entry notes that Alexander de Balscot, the bishop of Ossory and sovereign of Irishtown, objected to Kilkenny corporation levying octroi for murage on Irishtown market.) Prim's paper about the cats story was not published, though in one of 1870 he states, "Soon after [1658] the municipal body of Kilkenny became involved in an expensive lawsuit with the neighbouring Corporation of Irishtown, concerning questions of privilege and superior authority within the latter borough"; while in 1857 he wrote that John Hartstonge, as bishop of Ossory from 1693, and his brother Standish, as Recorder of Kilkenny from 1694, were on opposing sides of the dispute. C. A. Ward suggested in 1891 that Prim's explanation is "simply a tale invented after the fable relating to the cats had got into circulation". Prim's theory was bolstered in 1943 by publication, in a calendar of Ormond papers, of a 1596 arbitration between the corporations over markets, merchants' guilds, and musters. The New International Encyclopedia in 1903 claimed this allegory was a satire by Jonathan Swift, who attended Kilkenny College from 1673 to 1681. Henry Craik's 1894 biography suggests the alleged dispute between Englishtown and Irishtown was still in progress in Swift's time and was between Protestants and Catholics. In fact, Irishtown corporation was controlled by the Church of Ireland bishop of Ossory.

Thomas D'Arcy McGee in 1853 claimed the origin is a metaphor for feuding, not between Englishtown and Irishtown, but in the Confederation of Kilkenny between supporters and opponents of Ormonde's first peace in 1646. D. M. R. Esson in 1971 gave Ormonde's second peace in 1648 as the source.

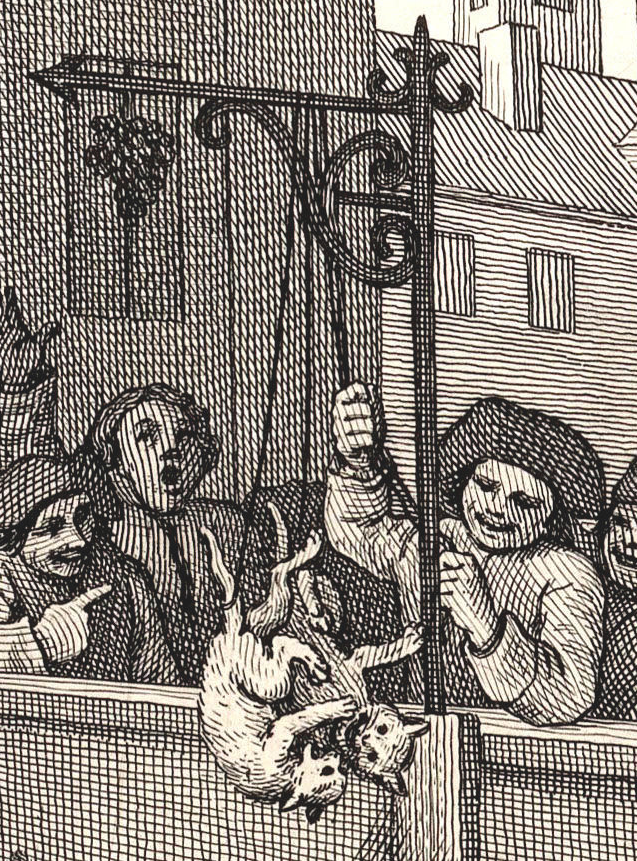
Detail from First stage of cruelty (Hogarth, 1751) depicting two cats tied and suspended by a rope to fight each other.

Another theory was reported by "Juverna" in Notes and Queries in 1864, as having been heard "in Kilkenny, forty years ago, from a gentleman of unquestioned veracity". The story holds that a group of bored soldiers stationed in Kilkenny held fights between two cats tied together by their tails and suspended from a clothes line or crosspost. (Note: This form of cat fighting is attested, usually instigated by boys, from the 18th to the early 20th century. A similar anecdote was attributed to Abraham Lincoln in an 1861 newspaper.) Their commander forbade the practice, but they carried on in secret. When the commander was heard approaching, a soldier hastily cut through the cats' tails, allowing them to escape. The commander asked about the hanging tail ends, and the soldier averred that the cats had eaten each other. In Juverna's version, the troops were Hessians after the Wexford Rebellion of 1798 or Emmet's Insurrection of 1803. A review in The Athenaeum of Ross' Book of Cats claims the soldiers were in the Williamite army of 1690. Prim agrees that the episode occurred with Hessians in 1798, but states that their sport was influenced by a story already proverbial. In other accounts, the soldiers were the regular garrison at Kilkenny Castle in Elizabethan times (1558–1603); or the Catholic Confederate army of the 1640s; or Cromwell's occupying force of the 1650s. John Baptist Crozier when Bishop of Ossory, Ferns and Leighlin endorsed the theory. Joseph O'Connor's 1951 memoir has Matt Purcell, a comrade of his father's in the 10th (North Lincoln) Regiment of Foot in the 1880s, claim the original Kilkenny cats were tied together by the Earl of Ormond's jester.

A 1324 witchcraft case in Kilkenny saw Dame Alice Kyteler flee and her servant Petronilla de Meath burnt at the stake after admitting relations with a demon which variously took the form of a dog, a cat, and an Aethiopian. This cat has occasionally been linked to the Kilkenny cats story. In 1857, John Thomas Gilbert made passing reference to "the Kilkenny cat of Dame Alice". Austin Clarke's 1963 poem "Beyond the Pale" recounts the story of "Dame Kyttler", continuing:

Soon afterwards, they say, that demon sired
The black cats of Kilkenny. They fought for scales
Of market fish, left nothing but their own tails
And their descendants never sit by the fire-side.

In 1986 Terence Sheehy suggested a link with the luchthigern, a beast mentioned in Broccán Craibdech's poem in the "Book of Leinster" as having been slain by Midgna's wife (Note: Aithbel is interpreted as Midgna's wife's name by Praeger and Dobbs but by Russell as a description of the fight.) at a place named Derc-Ferna. Luchthigern is usually interpreted as "mouse lord" and Derc-Ferna as Dunmore Cave near Kilkenny city. Sheehy follows Praeger and P.W. Joyce in regarding the luchthigern as a huge cat; in contrast to Brian O'Looney ("some sort of monster") Thomas O'Neill Russell ("Can this word mean a great mouse?") and Dobbs ("a demon or a giant"). A Dictionary of Celtic Mythology says that luchtigern was "Mouse-lord of Kilkenny, slain by a huge cat, Banghaisgidheach"; this is apparently a misreading of Joyce, who describes Midgna's (human) wife as a ban-gaisgidheach "female champion". Notably, another entry in the dictionary agrees with Joyce.

In 1857, the editor of The Journal of the Kilkenny and South-East of Ireland Archaeological Society suggested that a heading "Grimalkin slain in Ireland" reported in a synopsis of the 1584 book Beware the Cat might be relevant; this was disproved by an 1868 reply in the successor journal explaining that the episode (a version of the folktale "The King of the Cats") is set in Bantry in County Wexford about "Patrik Agore", a kern of John Butler, son of Richard Butler, 1st Viscount Mountgarret, who sets out to kill Cahir mac Art Kavanagh.

Authorities which discuss various origin theories include Brewer's Dictionary of Phrase and Fable (the Prim and Juverna theories in early editions; the 19th edition follows Brewer's Dictionary of Irish Phrase and Fable in plumping for the Juverna theory); the Encyclopædia Britannica Eleventh Edition (Prim, Juverna and J. P. Curran); World Wide Words (Prim, Juverna, and Redmond's great battle); Charles Earle Funk (the same three, Prim's credited to Swift; "probably none of them is true"); Terence Dolan (Juverna); and Eric Partridge (Curran). Cashman and Gaffney's Irish Proverbs & Sayings recounts the Juverna theory as "probably just a tall tale". As of 28 November 2019, the Oxford English Dictionary does not comment on any of the purported historical origins. (Note: The third edition, begun in 2000, has not yet updated the entry (s.v. "Kilkenny n.", sense 1).)

=== Folkloristics ===
Comparative mythology seeks to find parallels with folklore elsewhere. Angelo de Gubernatis wrote in 1872:

In a German belief noticed by Professor [Ernst Ludwig] Rochholtz, two cats that fight against each other are to a sick man an omen of approaching death. These two cats are probably another form of the children's game in Piedmont and Tuscany, called the game of souls, in which the devil and the angel come to dispute for the soul. Of the two cats, one is probably benignant and the other malignant; they represent perhaps night and twilight. An Irish legend tells us of a combat between cats, in which all the combatants perished, leaving only their tails upon the battlefield. (A similar tradition also exists in Piedmont, but is there, if I am not mistaken, referred to wolves. (Note: This may refer to an incident on Mont Cenis described by Marianne Colston in 1822: "On the summit we saw a cottage, into which, it being vacant during a time of very deep snow, seven wolves found their way; the snow closing the door they could not escape. Some time after, one wolf was discovered there and the heads of six others, so that it was evident that they had eaten each other, and that the surviving one had proved the strongest.")) Two cats that fight for a mouse, and allow it to escape, are also mentioned in Hindoo tradition.

Moncure Daniel Conway built on this in 1879:

De Gubernatis has a very curious speculation concerning the origin of our familiar fable the Kilkenny Cats, which he traces to the German superstition which dreads the combat between cats as presaging death to one who witnesses it; and this belief he finds reflected in the Tuscan child’s ‘game of souls,’ in which the devil and angel are supposed to contend for the soul. The author thinks this may be one outcome of the contest between Night and Twilight in Mythology; but, if the connection can be traced, it would probably prove to be derived from the struggle between the two angels of Death, one variation of which is associated with the legend of the strife for the body of Moses. The Book of Enoch says that Gabriel was sent, before the Flood, to excite the man-devouring giants to destroy one another. In an ancient Persian picture in my possession, animal monsters are shown devouring each other, while their proffered victim, like Daniel, is unharmed. The idea is a natural one, and hardly requires comparative tracing.

Carl Van Vechten in 1922 was sceptical:

Angelo de Gubernatis, too, is infected with this familiar and somewhat silly method of trying to explain all folk-stories symbolically. In "Zoological Mythology, or the Legends of Animals," he gives it as his belief that the celebrated fable of the Kilkenny Cats may mean the mythological contest between night and twilight. God pity these men!

"R.C." in 1874 suggested a comparison with an epigram by Palladas from the Greek Anthology:

A son and father started a competitive contest as to which could eat up all the property by spending most, and after devouring absolutely all the money they have at last each other to eat up.

Archer Taylor suggested the Kilkenny cats "may involve an old story with parallels in Icelandic saga"; in the Bandamanna saga, Ofeig says, "And with me it has fared after the fashion of wolves, who eat each other up until they come to the tail, not knowing till then what they are about".

The cat with two tails, a stonemason's carving associated with the Gobán Saor in Irish folklore, is sometimes conflated with the Kilkenny cats.

Steven Connor comments, "Because they involve bodily illogic ... in which a body is imagined as simultaneously present and absent, the cake both eaten and miraculously intact, the fact of death is often in play in Irish bulls".

In the 1930s the Irish Folklore Commission collected two origin stories:

- From Mrs Maher, Tulla, Threecastles, County Kilkenny, aged 87:
  One day a lady visitor came to Kilkenny Castle and brought with her three fat mice. The owner of the Castle never noticed anything until the place was full of mice. There were mice everywhere. They advertised for cats. Soon the castle was full of cats. The is how Kilkenny got the name "Kilkenny Cats".
- From Edward Quinn, Barrettsgrange, County Tipperary:
  In ancient times a team of Tipperary men visited Kilkenny to play a team of Kilkennymen at football. The Tipperarymen were winning, and advancing towards the Kilkenny–Tipperary border, when they were attacked by Kilkennymen and women, who fought like cats. The Tipperary followers retaliated, and picked up field stones and hurled them at their opponents, who had to retreat, the Tipperary team then being enabled to take the ball into their own territory.
  Ever afterwards the term "stonethrowers" was applied to Tipperary and "Kilkenny cats" to Kilkenny.

== Derivatives ==
=== Verse and song ===
Several poems have been written about the Kilkenny cats; the best known appeared in November 1867 in New York in The Galaxy, along with a grandiloquent literary commentary extolling it as "the Kilkenny epic" and comparing its "unknown author" to Homer:

There wonst was two cats in Kilkenny;
And aich thought there was one cat too many.
So they quarrelled and fit;
And they scratched, and they bit;
Till, excepting their tails
And some scraps of their nails,
Instead of two cats there wan't any.

This is often reduced to a limerick by omitting "excepting their tails and some scraps of their nails". With standardised spelling it has been included in 20th-century Mother Goose anthologies. The full version has been set to music by Beth Anderson and performed on her 2004 album Quilt Music by Keith Borden and H. Johannes Wallmann. It was also set by W. Otto Miessner for gradeschool music lessons, and arranged for six voices by Jean Berger as "There Were Two Cats at Kilkenny". James Barr Walker published an expanded version in 1871. (Note: Walker's version written for a school recital for his adopted son James Benzonia "Bennie" Walker (1862–1891).)

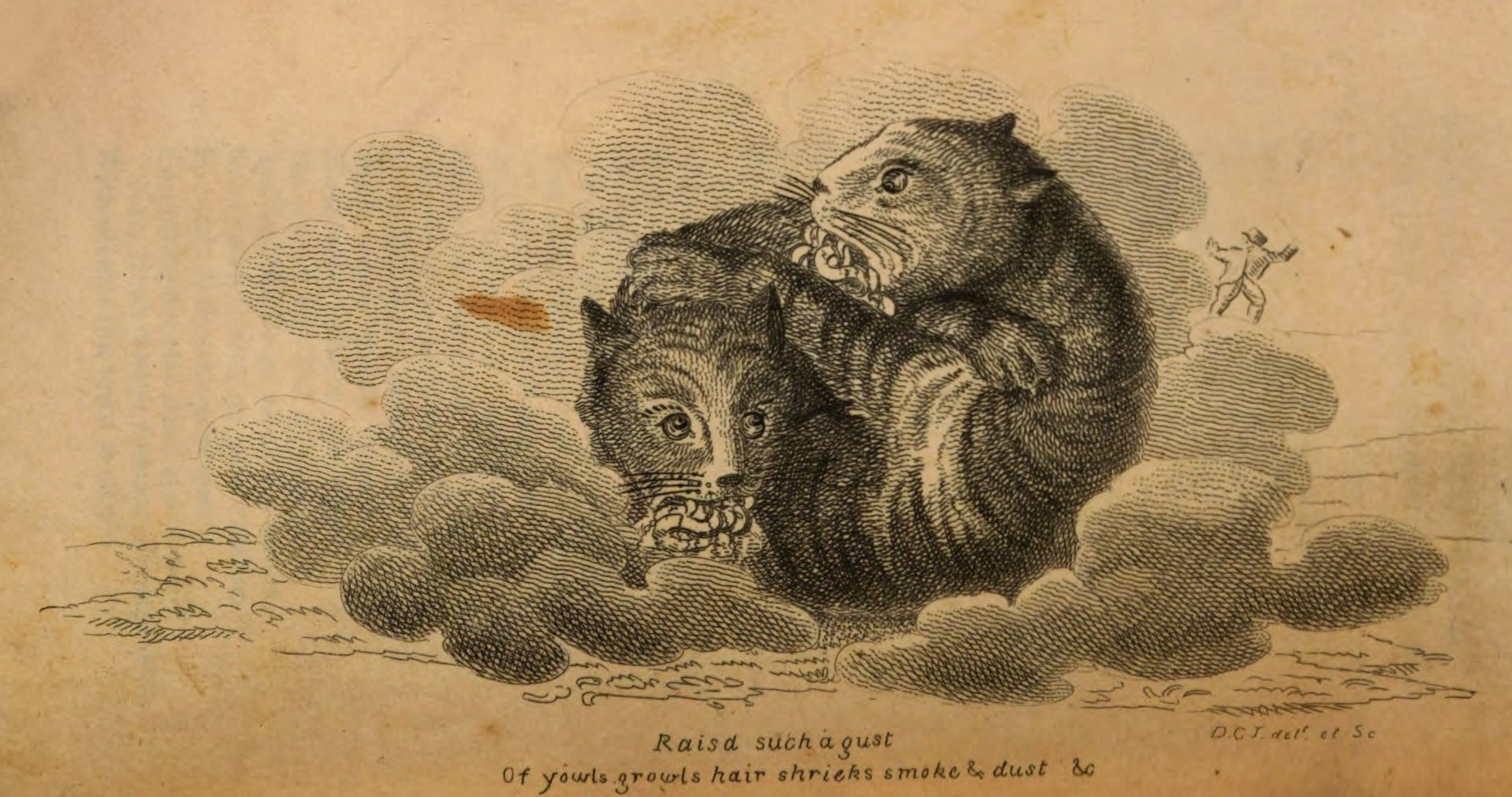
David Claypoole Johnston illustration for Mack's "The Cat-Fight" (1824)

Ebenezer Mack's 1824 poem "The Cat-Fight" is a stage Irish mock-heroic dialogue in which Jemmy O'Kain tells Pat M'Hone or Mahone that none of the great battles from myth and history compare to the one he witnessed "in Kilkenny, down the mole" between "two Grimalkins", at the end of which "... not the tip end of a tail, / Was there / Left for a token."

In Cruikshank's Omnibus in 1841 was printed "The Terrific Legend Of The Kilkenny Cats" by "C.B."; a 24-line poem in which there are six tomcats, owned and underfed by a drunk woman named O'Flyn; they resolve to kill and eat her, then turn on each other. A musical setting by Barry Kay was recorded in 1951 by Benny Lee. The poem also appeared on Islands Of The Moon, a 1981 spoken word album of poetry for children by the Barrow Poets.

The 1893 collection Irish Songs and Ballads, with words by Alfred Perceval Graves and music by Charles Villiers Stanford, included "The Kilkenny Cats", in which the cats resort to cannibalism after "the Game Laws came in", stopping them from hunting wild animals. Allen Doone published an original song in 1916 called "The Kilkenny Cats" based on the Juverna story. Other poetic adaptations include "The Kilkenny Legend" (Harvey Austin Fuller, 1873); "The Kilkenny Cats" (Anne L. Huber, 1873); "The Kilkenny Cats" (Laurence Winfield Scott, 1880); "The Cats av Kilkenny" (Charles Anthony Doyle, 1911).

=== Other ===
- The Cat of Kilkenny; or, The Forest of Blarney is a burlesque premiered at the Olympic Theatre in 1815.
- "The Kilkenny Cats" are a pair of chess problems composed by Sam Loyd in 1888, where the pieces are configured in a cat shape; Loyd accompanied the problem with a story of quarreling professors.
- Parker Brothers released "The Amusing Game of the Kilkenny Cats" in 1890 and "Rex and the Kilkenny Cats Game" in 1892.
- "Mighty Mouse and the Kilkenny Cats" is a 1945 cartoon in which Mighty Mouse saves the mice of Manhattan from a gang of cats whose leader's name is Kilkenny.
- The Kilkenny Beer Festival, sponsored by Smithwick's and held 1964–1974, included a cat show as one of the events.
- Robert Nye's 1976 novel Falstaff adapts the Juverna story to its 15th-century setting. Frank Pickbone is fooled in an unnamed Irish village by the dangling tails, until the title character (Note: Nye's character is based on John Fastolf and Shakespeare's Falstaff.) disabuses him.
- "Wild Cats of Kilkenny" is an instrumental track on The Pogues' 1985 album Rum Sodomy & the Lash, in which "two themes meld for a time before dueling and coming apart; all amid a series of feline-esque shrieks".
- The Kilkenny Cats alternative rock group feature in Athens, GA: Inside/Out, a 1987 documentary about the Athens music scene.
- The Cat Laughs comedy festival has been held in Kilkenny annually since 1995. The "Laughing Cat" logo of a cat hanging from a rope by its tail reflects the Juverna origin story.
- In 2007, a set of four Irish postage stamps on the topic of cats, commissioned by An Post from cartoonist Martyn Turner, included one of a "Kilkenny Cat", shown holding a hurley and wearing the Kilkenny county colours. (Note: The other stamps depicted a "Celtic Tigress", a "Fat Cat" and a pair of "Cool Cats".)
- A short film titled Two Cats was made in Kilkenny in 2018. It is described as a "modern reworking of the story" and premiered at the Kerry Film Festival with the tagline "Each thought there was one cat too many..."

== See also ==
- Self-cannibalism
  - Ouroboros, an ancient symbol depicting a serpent or dragon eating its own tail
- Strange loop
- Mutual assured destruction
- La Gatomaquia "The Battle of the Cats"; 1634 mock epic poem by Lope de Vega
- "Famous battel of the catts, in the province of Ulster, June 25, 1668"; a political allegory attributed, "almost certainly" incorrectly, to Sir John Denham.
- The Great Cat Massacre — by printers' apprentices in 1730s France
- Spartoi, in Greek myth fought each other till all (or all but five) were killed
- The Duel, a Eugene Field poem about a similar fight between a gingham dog and a calico cat
- Millions of Cats, a 1924 picture book in which cats fight to the death about which of them is the prettiest
