= Gaelic Journal =

Newspaper

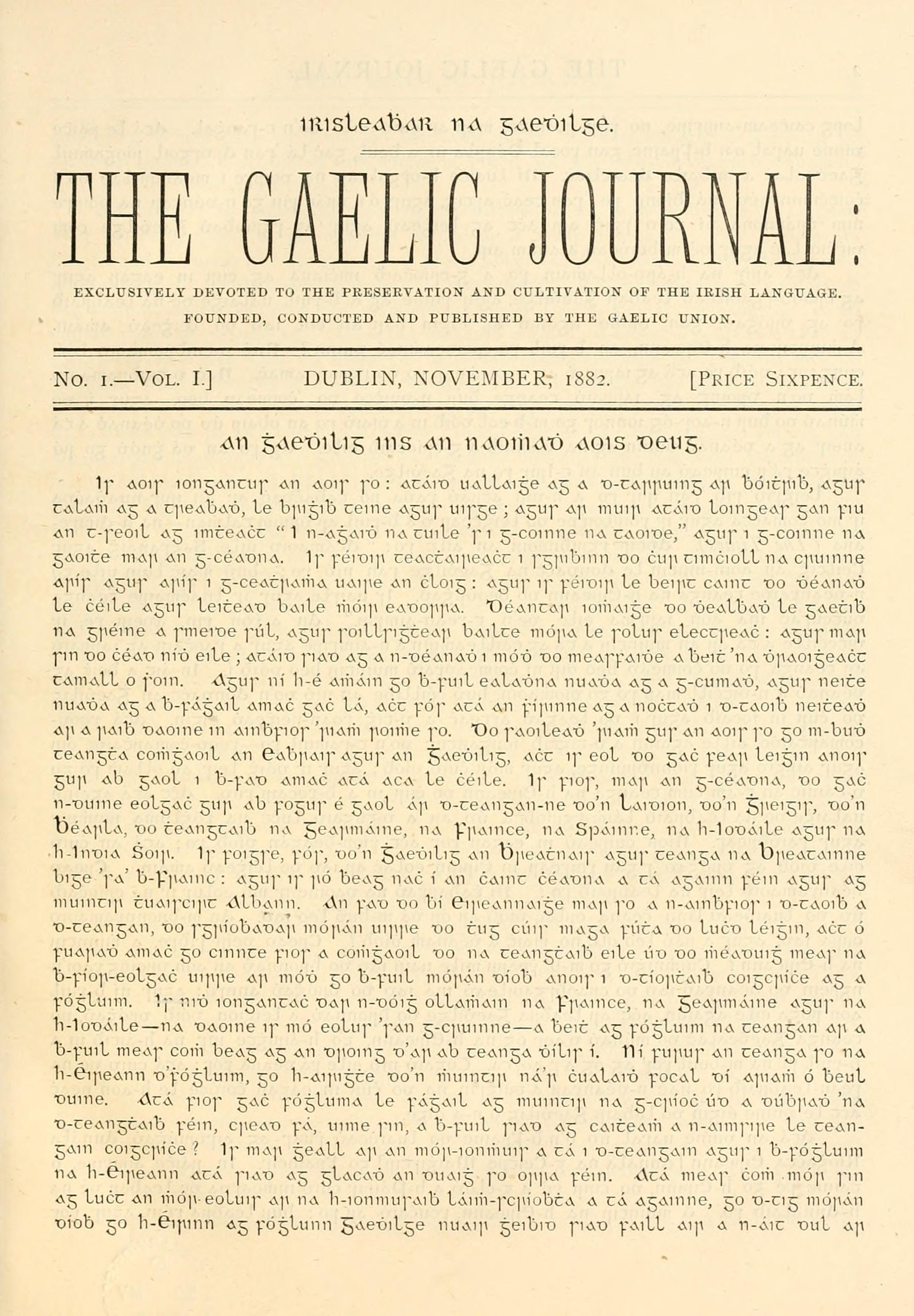
- Type: Monthly magazine
- Owner: Gaelic League
- Editor: Eoin Mac Néill
- Founded: 1882
- Ceased publication: 1909
- Political alignment: Nationalist / Republican

The Gaelic Journal (Irish: Irisleabhar na Gaedhilge) was a periodical publication "exclusively devoted to the preservation and cultivation of the Irish Language". According to Tomas O Flannghaile it was "the first journal devoted to the living Irish language". It has been described by the historian Donnchadh Ó Corráin as "the first important bilingual Irish periodical". An early manifestation of the Gaelic revival, it was established with the help of Douglas Hyde, and first published in 1882, by the Gaelic Union, and from 1893 by Conradh na Gaeilge. After some initial irregularities, the journal was published monthly until 1909.

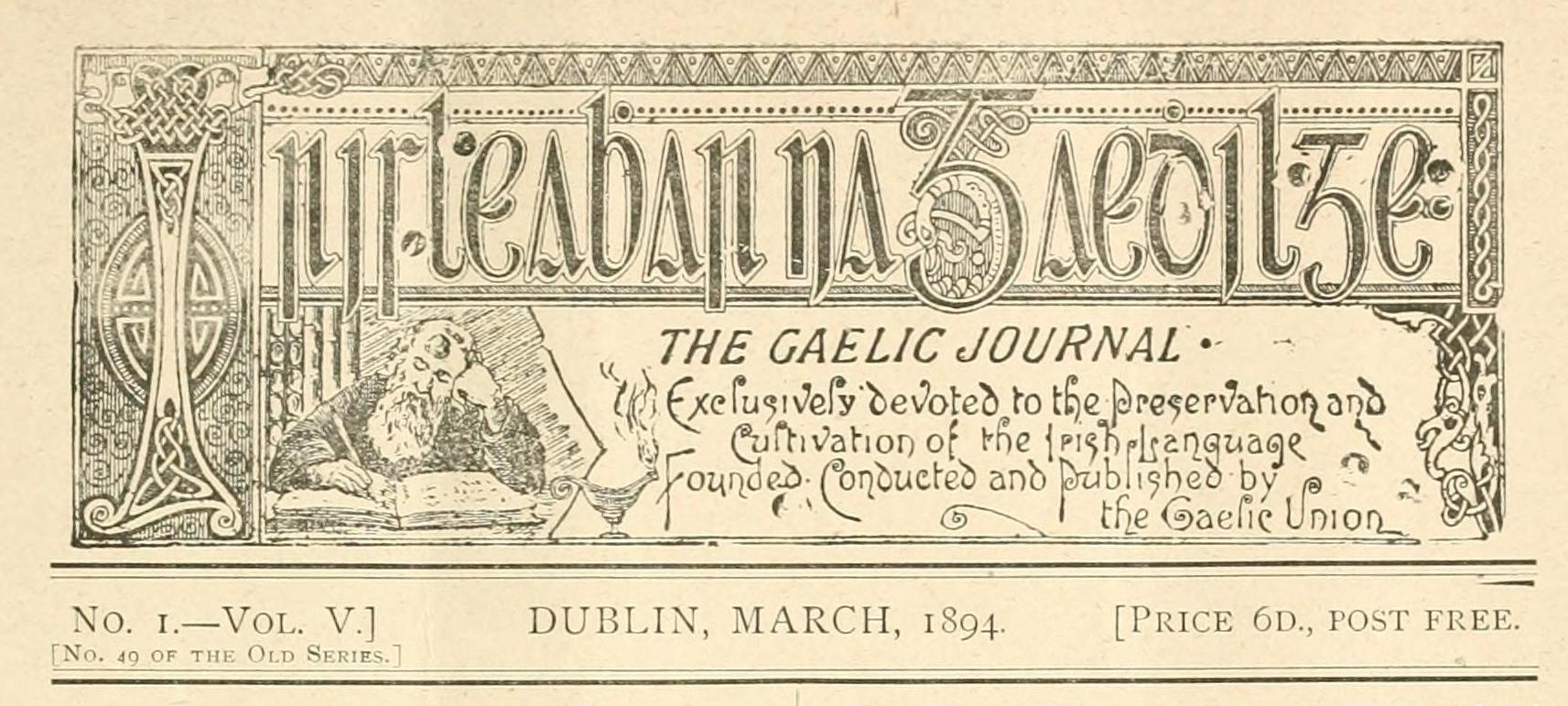
From 1894 the frontcover got a new logo, where the Irish name of the publication features more dominantly.

Its first editor was David Comyn, followed by John Fleming, Eoghan O'Growney and from November 1894 Eoin MacNeill. MacNeill was succeeded by Seosamh Laoide in 1899. From 1902 to 1909 the editor was Tadhg Ó Donnchadha.

The first 48 issues were numbered consecutively, with Volume 1 consisting of numbers 1–12, Volume 2 numbers 13–24 and so on. From Volume 5 in 1894 the numbering was 1–12 for each Volume.

The Gaelic Journal was bilingual, with texts in Irish and English. There were also occasionally texts published in other languages, Scottish Gaelic, Welsh and French. The content spanned many genres; folktales, literary texts, poetry, historical studies, fiction and drama, as well as articles on topics both academic and controversial. There was also a series of "Simple lessons in Irish", adapted from the series originally created by O'Growney for the Weekly Freeman.

In an article that appeared under the title "Our Position" in the third number of the Gaelic Journal in January 1883, the causes and agencies that made the Gaelic Journal a reality are mentioned, as

(1) a growing taste among the reading portion of our people for things national, and a juster idea of the value of such things as we can still call our own; (2) the labours of devoted Irish scholars during the last fifty years—as O'Donovan, O'Curry, Davis, Petrie, Todd, Archbishop MacHale, Canon Bourke, S. H. O'Grady, John Fleming, Hennessy and Whitley Stokes—some of whom, happily, we have still amongst us; (3) the labours of continental scholars in the general field of Indo-European philology, and more particularly those of Pictet, Zeuss, Ebel, Gaidoz, de Jubainville, and others in the special field of Celtic philology; (4) the labours of learned bodies like the Royal Irish Academy, the Celtic Society, even those of the Irish Archaeological Society, but more especially those of the Ossianic Society; (5) the establishment of the "Society for the Preservation of the Irish Language;" and (6) above all the formation of the Gaelic Union, for no other society or body had ever thought or would ever think of so practical a means of cultivating the language—or indeed, of cultivating the living language at all.

The causes that had "operated against the rise of a vernacular Irish press" are described as "beyond the scope and province of this journal to discuss," before it is added that "but as they are obvious, there is all the less need to refer to them here".
