= Naming names =

Naming names may refer to:

- Informant
- The Hollywood blacklist, during which witnesses denounced alleged communists to investigating committees of Congress
- Naming Names, a 1980 book by Victor Navasky about the Hollywood blacklist
- Naming Names: Book of Pseudonyms and Name Changes... by Adrian Room
