= John O'Hanlon (writer) =

Irish cleric, hagiographer and poet

The Very Reverend John O'Hanlon MRIA
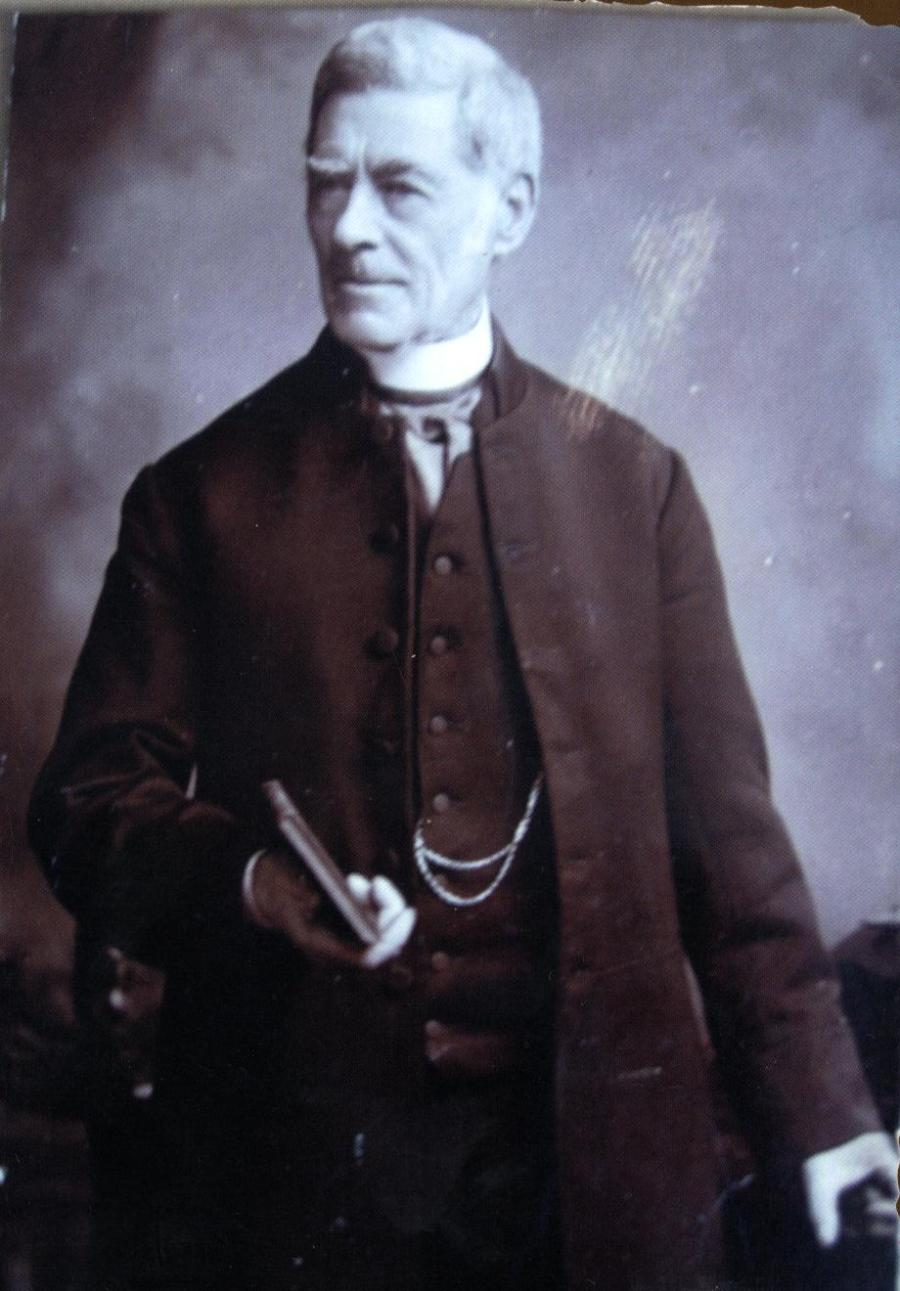
- John Canon O'Hanlon
- Born: 30 April 1821; Stradbally, Laois, Ireland
- Died: 15 May 1905 (aged 84); Dublin, Ireland
- Resting place: Glasnevin Cemetery, Dublin
- Occupations: Catholic priest, scholar, writer
- Writing career
- Language: English
- Notable work: Lives of the Irish Saints

John Canon O'Hanlon MRIA (30 April 1821 – 15 May 1905) was an Irish Catholic priest, scholar and writer who also published poetry and illustrations, and involved himself in Irish politics. He is best known as a folklorist and a hagiographer, and in particular for his comprehensive Lives of the Irish Saints.

== Life ==
O'Hanlon was born in Stradbally, Laois. His parents were Edward and Honor Hanlon. He attended the Preston School in Ballyroan and then entered Carlow College to study for the priesthood. Before he completed his studies, however, he emigrated in 1842 with members of his family, initially to Quebec, but ultimately to Missouri in the United States of America (a migration perhaps occasioned by the death of his father). The family settled in Millwood in northeast Missouri. O'Hanlon was admitted to the diocesan college in St. Louis, completed his studies, and was ordained in 1847. He was then assigned a mission in the diocese of St. Louis, where he ministered until 1853. He then returned to his native Stradbally for health reasons.

A year later, his health having improved, O'Hanlon offered his services to the Archdiocese of Dublin, and became a curate in the parish of Saints Michael and John. A fellow curate there was Charles Patrick Meehan and "many stories are told of their eccentricities". In 1880 he was appointed as parish priest of Sandymount and Ringsend in Dublin, where he ministered at the church of St. Mary's Star of the Sea in Irishtown (today there is a commemorative plaque on display in the church). He remained in Sandymount/Ringsend until his death in 1905. He had been made a Canon of the Dublin Cathedral by Archbishop Walsh in 1885, and celebrated his Golden Jubilee as a priest in 1897. He is buried in Glasnevin Cemetery.

== Writings ==
O'Hanlon began writing while in America. His time there coincided with mass immigration from Ireland due to the Great Famine, and he was deeply affected by the plight of these immigrants. As one consequence, he wrote An Irish Emigrant's Guide to the United States (a revised edition of which he would issue in 1890). But he also engaged in more scholarly writing, working on a biography of Saint Malachy, publishing some of his research as articles in the Boston Pilot, where he also published articles about Saint Patrick He also wrote an Abridgment of the History of Ireland (1849) (in 1903, in Ireland, he would publish an Irish-American History of the United States), and for a time he was editor of a Catholic newspaper, The St. Louis News-Letter.

O'Hanlon was very interested in local history and folklore, and when he returned to Ireland much of his writing concerned these topics. Among his first publications in Ireland were two letters, from 1856, published in the Journal of the Kilkenny and South-East of Ireland Archaeological Society, urging the usefulness of the records of the Ordnance Survey in the Phoenix Park for studying the history of the neighbouring counties of Kilkenny and his native Laois. The usefulness of the Ordnance Survey and the importance of local histories and topographies were constant themes for O'Hanlon and he would write twenty further bulletins about the Ordnance Survey and the histories of other counties in Ireland. Laois (which was known as Queen's County until 1922, but was always associated with the medieval kingdom of Loígis or Leix) was always of particular interest to O'Hanlon and he worked on a two-volume History of the Queen's County (although this was only posthumously published in 1907), published articles on the "Old Churches of Leix" in the Irish Builder during the 1880s, and collected the works of Laois patriot, balladeer and mythologist John Keegan, while the best known of his own poems is the "Land of Leix".

O'Hanlon's best-known work remains his hagiography, in particular his Lives of the Irish Saints, which organizes its chronicles by feast day, from 1 January to 31 December. O'Hanlon issued a prospectus for a subscription work on the lives of Irish saints in 1875, and published 9 volumes until he died in 1905, when he was working on a tenth, dealing with 3,500 saints across more than six thousand octavo pages. In addition to this magnum opus O'Hanlon published many works on individual saints, although he mostly re-used these articles and pamphlets in his Lives, often verbatim. In a similar manner, his work on the churches of Laois provided material for the Lives. As a work of hagiography, the Lives of the Irish Saints has been surpassed by modern scholarship, but it remains a treasure trove of local information and tradition.

O'Hanlon did not limit himself to the lives of saints, and his interests extended to secular and more contemporary figures. He issued new editions of works by William Molyneux (The Case of Ireland's Being Bound by Acts of Parliament in England Stated, 1893) and Henry Joseph Monck Mason (History of the Irish Parliament, 1891) and had plans to publish a definitive biography of Daniel O'Connell, although he set these aside to work on his history of Laois.

O'Hanlon was also a poet, publishing under the pseudonym "Lageniensis" (Leinster man). The collected works of Lageniensis centre on a long poem in Spenserian stanza, "The Land of Leix" and a series of lays recounting stories from Irish mythology. Characteristically, the poems are annotated with extremely copious local and historical information.

O'Hanlon was always an eager traveller, frequently journeying to Europe to research the Lives, and travelling thousands of miles through the US and Canada as a seventy-year-old man in 1891 (on the occasion of the jubilee of Archbishop Kenrick who had ordained him). Yet another string to his writer's bow could be said to be travel writing, in particular His Life and scenery in Missouri (1890). He also turned his hand to pedagogical works (Cathecism of Greek Grammar, 1865) and to devotional writing (Devotions for Cofession and Holy Communion, 1866).

== Interest in art ==
In addition to his other achievements, O'Hanlon was a competent illustrator, with a particular interest in recording local topographical features.

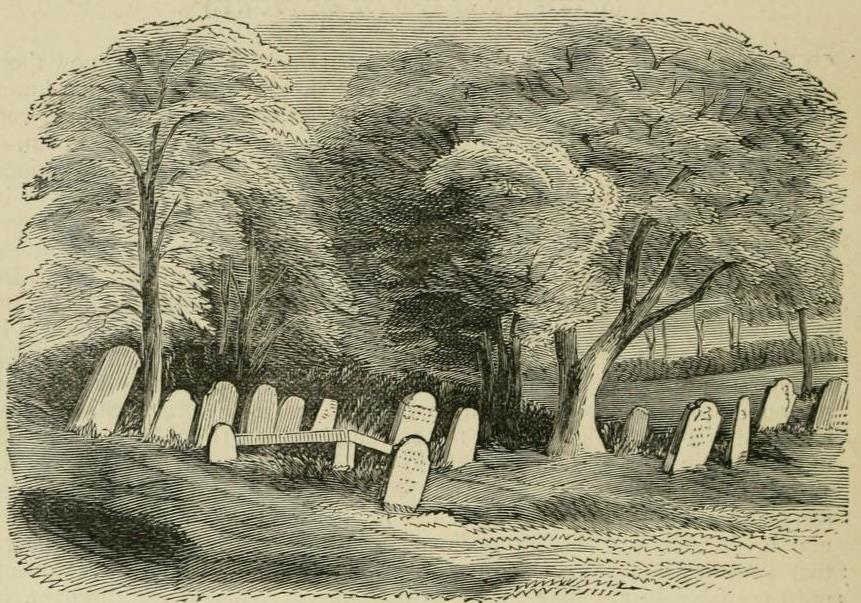
A sketch by O'Hanlon of Moycreddin lower Cemetery (1874)

128 of the illustrations in his Lives of the Irish Saints (about one fifth of the total) were made by O'Hanlon himself. O'Hanlon was a strong believer in the importance of topography, or the study of place, which is evident in his praise of the Ordnance Survey, for whom he advocated a government grant to employ artists to record local features. In his own drawings and his use of drawings by others he showed a clear concern to record visual antiquarian and historical details which otherwise might disappear.

These artistic abilities were also expressed in an interest in architecture. O'Hanlon wrote about the churches of Laois, commended the newly built church of St. Laurence O'Toole in Seville Place, Dublin, in his The Life of St. Lawrence O'Toole, Archbishop of Dublin (1857) and worked on the restoration of his own parish church, St. Mary Star of the Sea.

== The Irish language ==
O'Hanlon was very interested in the revival and preservation of the Irish language. He had joined the Ossianic Society when he returned from the United States, and as a curate in Dublin he was already a council member of the Society for the Preservation of the Irish Language (founded in 1877), with which he remained active until his death, becoming a vice-president. He edited work by the Irish language activist Henry Joseph Monck Mason. A Star of the Sea branch of Conradh na Gaeilge was founded in 1900 with O'Hanlon as its president. He was known for frequently attending its classes to offer encouragement to students.

== Politics ==
O'Hanlon's political convictions seem to date to his childhood. During that period there was a great deal of agitation and unrest in Ireland, both by moral and political activists, and by violent societies such as the Whiteboys and the Rockites. O'Hanlon recorded his early impression of the Ballykilvan evictions in 1828 and as a teenager attended Daniel O'Connell's meeting on the Great Heath in 1836. He was probably also influenced in his political convictions by his pastoral experiences a priest among the poor, in both St. Louis and Dublin.

O'Hanlon was no radical priest and he always submitted to the authority of his bishop, but certain of his publications attest to his own political views and to a desire to contribute to the political discussions about Ireland's status, both in Ireland and Britain. He attended the House of Commons in London in 1893 for some of the debates about Home Rule for Ireland, of which he was a proponent, and admired Charles Stewart Parnell, as well as William Gladstone. It was in this period, the 1890s, that he published his editions of Molyneux's The Case of Ireland's Being Bound by Acts of Parliament in England Stated and Monck Mason's History of the Irish Parliament with the apparent goal of returning these earlier advocates of Irish autonomous government to popular consciousness. He dedicated the latter to Gladstone. When he collected his poetical works as Lageniensis, he addressed the dedication to Lady Aberdeen, whose husband had served as Lord Lieutenant of Ireland and had just been appointed as Governor General of Canada, both viceregal positions. O'Hanlon commends Aberdeen for her work with the poor in Ireland and her establishment of the Irish Industries Association. He then goes on to compare the situations of Ireland and Canada in relation to Home Rule, and argues that Ireland should be granted the same autonomy as Canada and, in a bitter reference to the Parnellite split deplores the "malign and sinister obstruction to which Irish Home Rule has been subjected through bigotry, unnatural party combination, class prejudice and selfishness", while hoping that eventually there will be established in Ireland "a Constitution, which shall secure equal rights and liberties for all creeds and parties in Ireland, while promoting and consolidating still more the strength and resources of the British Empire".

After the failures of Parnell's party, as well as the final resignation of their key ally Gladstone, in 1894, O'Hanlon seems to have given up hope for Home Rule. But his true political hero remained Daniel O'Connell. O'Hanlon was General Secretary of the O'Connell Monument Committee, author of their Report (1888), and probably the main driver overcoming many setbacks during the difficult 20-year period it took to erect a monument to O'Connell in Dublin's Sackville Street (now O'Connell Street).

== A modest fame ==
O'Hanlon was a modest man but he was recognized for his achievements. At his Golden Jubilee his parishioners and fellow priests recognized his pastoral work, his patriotic advocacy or Irish national interests, and his extensive writings. William Walsh, the archbishop of Dublin, remarked that he worked so hard at his pastoral duties that men wondered how he found time to write, but he wrote so much that men wondered how he found time to do any missionary work. He associated with literary circles in Dublin. He was elected a Member of the Royal Irish Academy.

Finally, tribute was paid to O'Hanlon by none other than James Joyce, in the Nausicaa episode of Ulysses, where his activities in the St. Mary Star of the Sea church counterpoint Leopold Bloom's observation of Gerty McDowell on the nearby Sandymount Strand: "and the blue banners of the blessed Virgin's sodality and Father Conroy was helping Canon O'Hanlon at the altar".

== List of works ==
- Abridgment of the History of Ireland from its Final Subjection to the Present Time (Boston, 1849)
- The Irish Emigrant's Guide to the United States (Boston, 1851; new edition, Dublin, 1890)
- The Life of St. Laurence O'Toole, Archbishop of Dublin (Dublin, 1857)
- The Life of St. Malachy O'Morgair, Bishop of Down and Connor, Archbishop of Armagh (Dublin, 1859)
- The Life of St. Dympna, Virgin Martyr (Dublin, 1863)
- Catechism of Irish History from the Earliest Events to the Death of O'Connell (Dublin, 1864)
- Catechism of Greek Grammar (Dublin, 1865)
- Devotions for Confession and Holy Communion (Dublin, 1866)
- The Life and Works of St. Oengus the Culdee, Bishop and Abbot (Dublin, 1868)
- The Life of St. David, Archbishop of Menevia, Chief Patron of Wales (Dublin, 1869)
- Legend Lays of Ireland (verse, under the pseudonym "Lageniensis") (Dublin, 1870)
- Irish Folk-Lore, Traditions and Superstitions of the Country; with Humorous Tales (Lageniensis) (Glasgow, 1870)
- Lives of the Irish Saints: with special festivals, and the commemorations of holy persons, compiled from calendars, martyrologies, and various sources, relating to the ancient church history of Ireland (Dublin, 9 volumes published from 1875, with a 10th partially completed in 1905)
- The Buried Lady, a Legend of Kilronan (Lageniensis) (Dublin, 1877)
- The Life of St. Grellan, Patron of the O'Kellys (Dublin, 1881)
- Report of the O'Connell Monument Committee (Dublin, 1888)
- Life and Scenery in Missouri (Dublin, 1890)
- The Poetical Works of Lageniensis (Dublin, 1893)
- Irish-American History of the United States (Dublin, 1902)
- History of the Queen's County (completed by Rev. E. O'Leary) (Dublin, 1907)
- Editor, Henry Joseph Monck Mason Essay on the Antiquity and Constitution of Parhaments of Ireland (1891)
- Editor, William Molyneux The Case of Ireland's Being Bound by Acts of Parliament in England Stated (1893)
- Editor, Legends and Stories of John Keegan (with a memoir of Keegan by David James O'Donoghue) (Dublin, 1908)
