= Peadar Ua Laoghaire =

Irish writer and priest

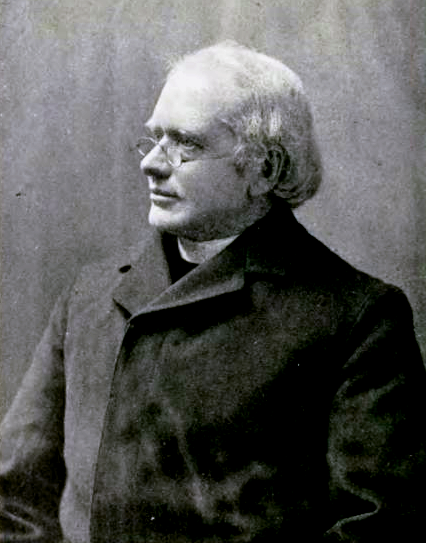
- Born: 30 April 1839; Liscarrigane, Clondrohid, County Cork
- Died: 21 March 1920 (aged 80); Castlelyons, County Cork
- Education: Maynooth College
- Occupations: Catholic priest; writer
- Writing career
- Language: Munster Irish
- Notable works: Séadna (1904); Mo Sgéal Féin (1915)
- Movement: Gaelic revival

Father Peadar Ua Laoghaire or Peadar Ó Laoghaire (Irish pronunciation: [ˈpʲad̪ˠəɾˠ oː ˈl̪ˠeːɾʲə], first name locally [ˈpʲad̪ˠəɾʲ]; 30 April 1839 – 21 March 1920), also anglicised as Peter O'Leary, was an Irish writer and Catholic priest, who is regarded today as one of the founders of modern literature in Irish.

== Life ==
He was born in Liscarrigane (Irish: Lios Carragáin) in the parish of Clondrohid (Irish: Cluain Droichead), County Cork, and grew up speaking Munster Irish in the Muskerry Gaeltacht. He was a descendant of the Carrignacurra branch of the Ó Laoghaire of the ancient Corcu Loígde.

He attended Maynooth College and was ordained a priest of the Roman Catholic Church in 1867. He became a parish priest in Castlelyons in 1891, and it was there that he wrote his most famous story, Séadna, and told it as a fireside story to three little girls. Séadna was the first major literary work of the emerging Gaelic revival. It was serialised in the Gaelic Journal from 1894, and published in book form in 1904. The plot of the story concerns a deal that the shoemaker Séadna struck with the devil. Although the story is rooted in the folklore the writer heard from shanachies by the fire during his youth, it is also closely related to the German legend of Faust. It was first published as a serial in various Irish-language magazines.

Apart from Séadna, Ua Laoghaire wrote an autobiography called Mo Sgéal Féin ("My Own Story"), published by Norma Borthwick's Irish Book Company. In addition, he translated some stories of medieval Gaelic literature into modern Irish, such as Eisirt and An Cleasaí, and translated an abridged version of Don Quixote into his local dialect of Irish.

Peadar Ua Laoghaire became known for his support for caint na ndaoine, the real Irish of the people rather than any attempt to revive older forms of Irish. But he also drew careful distinctions between what he saw as good Irish and bad Irish, saying in chapter 5 of Mo Sgéal Féin,

Before I left Liscarrigane, I had never heard from anybody's mouth phrases such as "tá mé", "bhí mé", "bhí siad"; I always used to hear "táim", "bhíos", "bhíodar", etc. Little things! – but little things that come repeatedly into conversation. A taut mode of expression, as against one that is lax, makes for finish in speech; in the same manner, a lax mode of expression as against the taut, makes for speech that is deficient. Besides, the taut speech possesses a force and a vigour that cannot be contained in speech that is falling apart...The loose mode of expression is prominent in Gaelic today and English is nothing else. English has fallen apart completely.

Accordingly, he strongly promoted Cork Irish as what he saw as the best Irish for propagation among the people.

He died in Castlelyons at the age of 80, and is buried in Castlelyons churchyard.

== Works ==
The following is a partial list of his works:

- Ar nDóithin Araon, 1894
- Mion-chaint, an easy Irish phrase book, compiled for the Gaelic League, 1899
- Eólas ar áireamh, arithmetical tables in Irish, 1902
- An Soísgéal as Leabar an aifrinn, 1902 (the liturgical readers from the Missal)
- Irish prose composition: a series of articles, including several upon the Irish autonomous verb, 1902
- Aesop a Tháinig go hÉirinn, 1903
- Sgothbhualadh, a series of articles in Irish reprinted from the "Leader", 1904
- Séadna, 1904 (originally serialised in 1898)
- An Craos-Deamhan, 1905
- An Bealach Buidhe, a drama, 1906
- Tóruigheacht Dhiarmuda agus Ghráinne, 1906
- Niamh 1907
- Eisirt, 1909
- Seanmóin agus trí fichid, sermons for every Sunday and holy day of the year, 1909–10
- An sprid: Bas Dalláin: Tadhg Saor, three short plays, 1911
- An Cleasaidhe, 1913
- Caitilina, 1913
- Aithris ar Chríost, 1914 (a translation into Irish of Thomas à Kempis' The Imitation of Christ)
- Sliabh na mban bhFionn agus Cúan Fithise, 1914
- Lughaidh Mac Con, 1914
- Bricriu, 1915
- Na Cheithre Soisgéil as an dTiomna Nua, 1915 (a translation into Irish of the Four Gospels)
- Mo Sgéal Féin, 1915
- Guaire, 1915
- Ag Séideadh agus ag ithe, 1918
- An teagasg críosdaidhe, edited by Ua Laoghaire, 1920
- Don Cíchóté, a partial translation of Miguel de Cervantes' early 17th century novel Don Quixote, 1921
- Gníomhartha na nAspol, 1921 (a translation into Irish of the Acts of the Apostles)
- Lúcián, 1924
- Sgéalaidheachta as an mBíobla naomhtha, 1924 (stories from the Bible)
- Críost Mac Dé, 1925
- Sgealaidheacht na Macabéach, 1926 (the stories of the Maccabees from the Apocrypha)
- Aodh Ruadh, an adaptation of the life of Hugh Roe O'Donnell (Aodh Ruadh Ó Domhnaill) originally by Lughaidh Ó Cléirigh in the 17th century, 1929
- Notes on Irish words and usages
- Papers on Irish idiom: together with a translation into Irish of part of the first book of Euclid, by the late canon Peter O'Leary; edited by Thomas F. O'Rahilly.
- Cómhairle ár leasa, articles published in the "Leader"
- Mo shlighe chun Dé: leabhar urnaighthe

An article listing 487 of Ua Laoghaire's articles and other works was published in Celtica in 1954.

== See also ==
- Feardorcha Ó Conaill
