= Gaelic revival =

19th-century Irish language revival

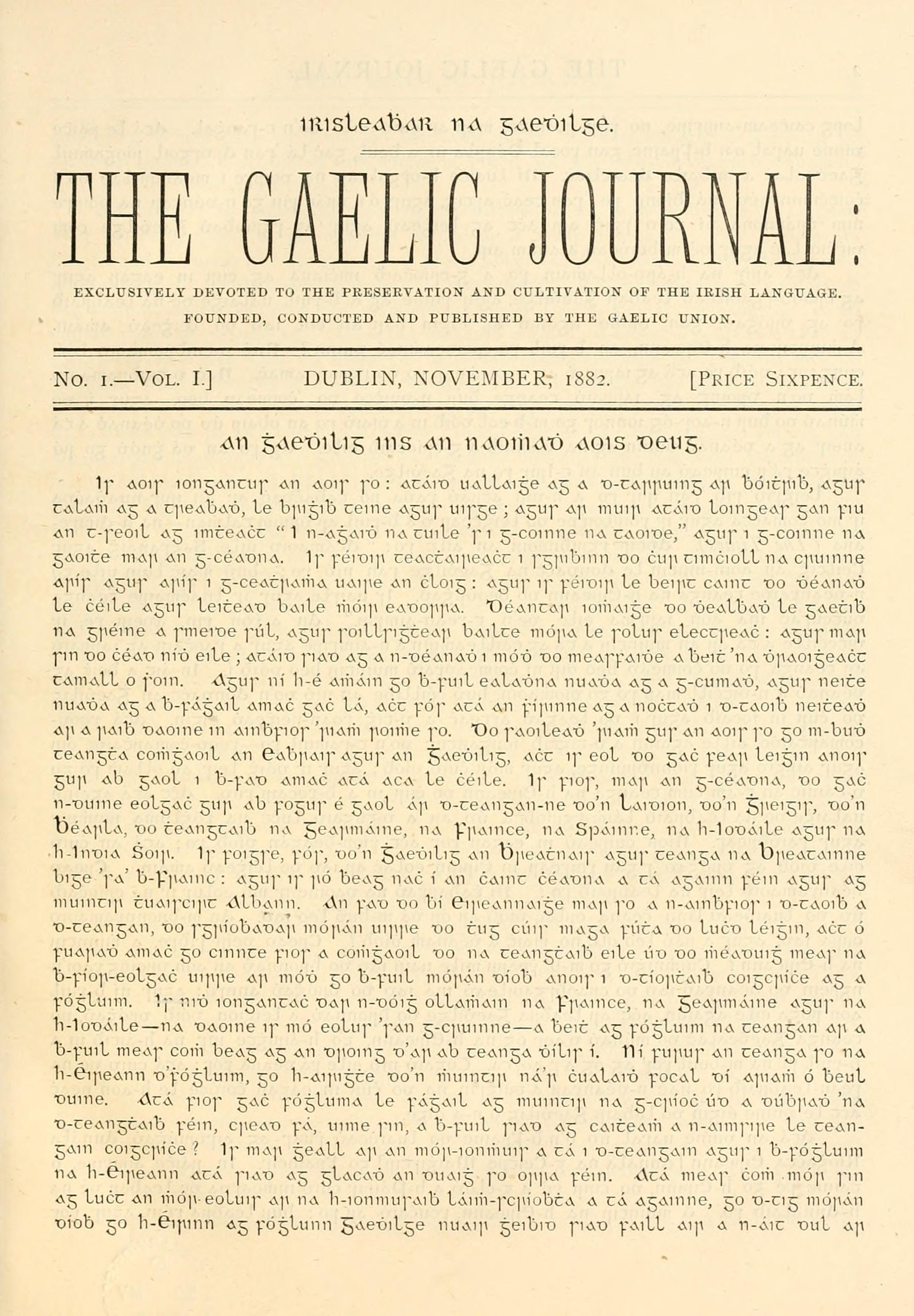
The Gaelic Journal, an early organ of the Gaelic revival movement

The Gaelic revival (Irish: Athbheochan na Gaeilge) was the late-nineteenth-century national revival of interest in the Irish language (also known as Gaelic) and Irish Gaelic culture (including folklore, mythology, sports, music, arts, etc.). Irish had diminished as a spoken tongue, remaining the main daily language only in isolated rural areas, with English having become the dominant language in the majority of Ireland.

Interest in Gaelic culture was evident early in the nineteenth century with the formation of the Belfast Harp Society in 1808 and the Ulster Gaelic Society in 1830, and later in the scholarly works of Robert Shipboy MacAdam, John O'Donovan and Eugene O'Curry, and the foundation of the Ossianic Society. Concern for spoken Irish led to the formation of the Society for the Preservation of the Irish Language in 1876, and the Gaelic Union in 1880. The latter produced the Gaelic Journal. Irish traditional sports were fostered by the Gaelic Athletic Association, founded in 1884.

The Gaelic League (Conradh na Gaeilge) was established in 1893 by Eoin MacNeill and other enthusiasts of Gaelic language and culture. Its first president was Douglas Hyde. The objective of the league was to encourage the use of Irish in everyday life in order to counter the ongoing anglicisation of the country. It organised weekly gatherings to discuss Irish culture, hosted conversation meetings, edited and periodically published a newspaper named An Claidheamh Soluis, and successfully campaigned to have Irish included in the school curriculum. The league grew quickly, having more than 48 branches within four years of its foundation and 400 within 10. It had fraught relationships with other cultural movements of the time, such as the Pan-Celtic movement and the Irish Literary Revival.

Important writers of the Gaelic revival include Peadar Ua Laoghaire, Patrick Pearse (Pádraig Mac Piarais) and Pádraic Ó Conaire.

== Early movements ==
=== The Belfast "renaissance" ===
The Belfast "renaissance of Irish music", that saw the staging of the Belfast Harpers Assembly in July 1792, has been seen as "the precursor by a century of the Irish Gaelic Revival", and to have been "the beginning of a long association between northern Protestants" and the struggle to preserve and advance the Irish language". In 1795, with the aim of preventing "the total neglect and to diffuse the beauties of this ancient and much-acclaimed language", the Northern Star, the newspaper of the United Irishmen, produced the Irish-language grammar, dictionary and anthology, Bolg an tSolair. In the same year, the Star advertised classes in the language offered by Pádraig Ó Loingsigh (Patrick Lynch) at the Belfast Academy.

In 1808, one of the harp festival's principal organisers, the physician and polymath, James MacDonnell established the Belfast Harp Society. In addition to "preserving the national music and national instrument of Ireland", it sought to procure and disseminate "information relative to the language, history and antiquities of Ireland".

With an additional subscription from MacDonnell, and with the enthusiastic support of Mary Ann McCracken (who is known to have studied from Charles Vallency's Irish grammar), and her Gaeilgeoir friend, the poet Mary Balfour of Limavady, the Society organised Irish language classes. These were provided by James Cody. who used An Introduction to the Irish Language (1808) compiled by the Presbyterian minister William Neilson (Uilliam Mac Néill).

From 1828/30, MacDonnell resumed this work as chairman of Cuideacht Gaoidhilge Uladh (the Ulster Gaelic Society). The society focused on the contemporary Irish vernacular, rather than in the classical language of manuscripts, but abjured the religious evangelism that persuaded other Protestants to pursue a similar interest. With Tomás Ó Fiannachta, Robert Shipboy MacAdam, joint secretary of the society, published An introduction to the Irish language intended for the use of Irish classes in the Royal Belfast Academical Institution – a grammar for the school founded on progressive principles by William Drennan and other United Irish veterans.

After the Ulster Gaelic Society ceased to operate in 1843, MacAdam employed the poet Aodh Mac Domhnaill (Hugh McDonnell) as a full-time scribe and collector of songs, folklore, and Irish-language manuscripts. MacAdam himself collected extensively, sometimes finding his material among Irish-speaking immigrants to Belfast.

=== Dublin societies ===
Early pioneers of more rigorous Irish scholarship were John O'Donovan (who was to become professor of Celtic Languages at Queen's College, Belfast), Eugene O'Curry and George Petrie. O'Donovan and O'Curry found an important outlet for their work in the Irish Archaeological Society, one of the first text publication societies of Ireland, founded in 1840. In 1854 it merged with the Celtic Society, to form the Irish Archaeological and Celtic Society.

From 1853, translations of Irish literary works, particularly mythological works of the Ossianic Cycle—associated with the Fianna—were published by the Ossianic Society, in which Standish Hayes O'Grady was active. The Society for the Preservation of the Irish Language was formed in 1877 by, among others, George Sigerson and Thomas O'Neill Russell. The secretary of that society, Father John Nolan, split with it in 1880 and formed the Gaelic Union, of which the president was The O'Conor Don, and whose members included Douglas Hyde and Michael Cusack. Cusack's interest in Gaelic culture was not restricted to the language; he took a keen interest in the traditional games of Ireland, and in 1884, with Maurice Davin, he would found the Gaelic Athletic Association to promote the games of Gaelic football, hurling and handball. In 1882 the Gaelic Union began publication of a monthly journal, the Gaelic Journal. Its first editor was David Comyn; he was followed by John Fleming, a prominent Irish scholar, and then Father Eugene O'Growney.

== Gaelic League ==
In November 1892 Douglas Hyde gave a lecture to the National Literary Society entitled "The Necessity for De-Anglicising Ireland." He said that the Irish people had become almost completely anglicised, and that this could only be reversed through building up the language. Eoin MacNeill followed this up with an article in the Gaelic Journal, "A Plea and a Plan for the Extension of the Movement to Preserve and Spread the Gaelic language in Ireland", and set about forming an organisation to help bring this about, together with Eugene O'Growney and J. H. Lloyd (Seosamh Laoide). The Gaelic League (Conradh na Gaeilge) was founded on 31 July 1893. Hyde was elected president, MacNeill secretary, and Lloyd treasurer, and Thomas O'Neill Russell was among those elected to the council.

The Gaelic League held weekly meetings that were a combination of classes and conversation. Its focus on the vernacular form of language and modern literature distinguished it from the Society for the Preservation of the Irish Language, The Celtic Society and the Gaelic Union. Within months it had branches in Cork and Galway. After four years it had 43 branches, and after ten years more than 400. Although it was more concerned with fostering the language in the home than with teaching it in schools, it was nonetheless successful in having Irish added to the curriculum; the number of schools teaching it rose from about a dozen in the 1880s to 1,300 in 1903. The League took over the Gaelic Journal in 1894, when O'Growney retired as editor, with MacNeill replacing him. In January 1898 it began publication of a weekly newspaper, Fáinne an Lae. In March of the following year, following a dispute with the owner, this was replaced by An Claidheamh Soluis, with MacNeill again as editor. In 1901 MacNeill was replaced as editor by Eoghan Ó Neachtain, who was in turn replaced in 1903 by Patrick Pearse. The League also concerned itself with the folk music of Ireland, and was involved in the movement which led to the organisation of the Feis Ceoil (Festival of Music) by Annie Patterson in 1897.

The League's relations with contemporary cultural movements were strained, and sometimes hostile, despite the fact that some of the League's leaders were on friendly terms with those movements. Pan-Celticism was viewed with suspicion by many members because its leaders in Ireland, especially Lord Castletown, were closely associated with the Irish establishment. When Douglas Hyde was invited to the planned Pan-Celtic Congress of 1900—to be held in Dublin—as a delegate of the League, the Coiste Gnótha (executive committee) refused to send any representative, though Hyde might attend as an individual if he wished. Hyde reluctantly declined to attend. The Irish Literary Revival was denounced because its works were written in English, not Irish, and therefore tended even more towards anglicisation. Eoin MacNeill wrote, "Let them write for the 'English-speaking world' or the 'English-speaking race' if they will. But let them not vex our ears by calling their writings Irish and national." Patrick Pearse said of the Irish Literary Theatre, recently founded by W. B. Yeats and Lady Gregory, that it should be "strangled at birth".

== Writers ==
An tAthair Peadar Ua Laoghaire (Father Peter O'Leary), a parish priest from Castlelyons in County Cork, began contributing to the Gaelic Journal in 1894, and in November of that year he published the first instalment of Séadna, which was to become his best-known work. It was described by the journal as a "specimen of Munster Irish, one of the best samples, if not the very best, of southern popular Gaelic that has ever been printed." Séadna was the first major work of modern literature in Irish. Ua Laoghaire serialised the Táin Bó Cúailnge in the Cork Weekly Examiner in 1900–1901, and followed it up with a series of modern renderings of ancient Irish tales such as Bricriu, Eisirt, An Cleasaidhe and An Craos-Deamhan, all of which eschewed scholarship in favour of colloquial, entertaining Irish. After Séadna, his best-known work is his autobiography, Mo Scéal Féin. All his works are written in what was called caint na ndaoine (the language of the people).

Patrick Pearse (Pádraig Mac Piarais), the editor of An Claidheamh Soluis—and later a revolutionary leader in the Easter Rising—wrote poetry, short stories and plays. He is considered the first modernist writer in Irish. Pearse rejected what he called the imposition of "dead linguistic and literary forms on a living language", but at the same time rejected the idea that only native speakers like Ua Laoghaire could produce "Irish Irish". He produced two books of short stories, Íosagán agus Scéalta Eile (1907) and An Mháthair agus Scéalta Eile (1916). His collection of poems, Suantraithe agus Goltraithe (1914) contains his most famous poem, "Mise Éire" ("I am Ireland").

Pádraic Ó Conaire is sometimes considered to be the best writer of the period. He wrote more than 400 short stories between 1901 and his death in 1928. His stories were darker than those of his contemporaries. According to his entry in the Dictionary of Irish Biography, they deal with "isolation, conflict between good and evil, the tragedy of life, hatred, blindness, despair, and madness." He wrote one novel, Deoraíocht (Exile), described by John T. Koch as a "strange and brooding psychological novel, the first of the genre in Irish", about a Connemara man living in London. Ó Conaire's works were controversial, addressing themes such as alcoholism and prostitution, which Ua Laoghaire and others within the movement found objectionable.

== See also ==
- Language revival
- Celtic Revival
- Cornish revival
- Irish Literary Revival
- Scottish Gaelic Renaissance
