= Brewer's Dictionary of Irish Phrase and Fable =

Dictionary of Phrase and Fable

Brewer's Dictionary of Irish Phrase and Fable (ISBN 0-304-36334-0) was created by Jo O'Donoghue and Sean McMahon for the Brewer's Dictionary of Phrase and Fable series of books. It contains over five thousand entries regarding various subjects about Ireland and its sayings, myths, legends and fables.

== See also ==
- Brewer's Dictionary of Phrase and Fable
- Brewer's Rogues, Villains and Eccentrics
