= Brian O'Looney =

Irish scholar, poet, scribe and antiquarian (1828–1901)

- Born: 28 August 1828; Móin Riail, near Ennistymon, County Clare, Ireland
- Died: 1 December 1901 (aged 73); Crumlin, Dublin, Ireland
- Occupation: Scholar

Brian O'Looney (Irish: Brian Ó Luanaigh; 28 August 1828 – 1 December 1901) was an Irish scholar of the Irish language, Celticist, poet, scribe and antiquarian. He is particularly known for transcribing and editing medieval Irish manuscripts, translating Irish literary texts into English, and advocating the teaching and preservation of the Irish language during the nineteenth-century Gaelic revival. He was a professor of Irish language, literature and archaeology at the Catholic University of Ireland and a member of the Royal Irish Academy.

== Early life and education ==
O'Looney was born on 28 August 1828 at Móin Riail, near Ennistymon, County Clare, Ireland. He was the second-youngest child in his family. He received his early education at a model farm school established by the earls of Inchiquin in north County Clare. The curriculum included agriculture, agricultural engineering, surveying, English and English literature. He was an outstanding pupil, although little is known about when or how he acquired his knowledge of classical Irish and the ability to read medieval Irish manuscripts.

== Political involvement and return to Ireland ==
In July 1848, at the age of nineteen, O'Looney took part in the Young Ireland uprising led by William Smith O'Brien at Ballingarry, County Tipperary. Following the failure of the revolt, he escaped with several others to Limerick, where they boarded a ship bound for the United States. He spent a short period in America before returning to Ireland.

After his return, he worked as director of rural industry for the County Clare agricultural board. His involvement in the 1848 rebellion appears to have been a brief episode in his life; he subsequently devoted himself primarily to Irish literature and scholarship.

== Manuscript scholarship and literary work ==
From 1857, O'Looney worked with William Smith O'Brien, assisting him in examining and transcribing Irish-language manuscripts. Much of this work was undertaken between 1858 and 1864. When Smith O'Brien died, he bequeathed seventeen manuscripts to the Royal Irish Academy, approximately half of which had been copied in O'Looney's handwriting.

O'Looney also worked for other patrons. For Major W. E. A. Mac Donnell of Ennis, he compiled and edited a collection of poems associated with the MacDonnell family of County Clare. The collection was published by John O'Daly in 1863 under the title A Collection of Poems Written on Different Occasions by the Clare bards in honour of the MacDonnells of Kilkee and Kilrone in the county of Clare.

His scholarly work largely consisted of editing narratives and poems preserved in Irish manuscripts and providing English translations. He was a member of the Ossianic Society and was elected to the Royal Irish Academy in April 1871. His manuscripts are held in several Irish collections, including those of the National Library of Ireland, the Royal Irish Academy and University College Cork.

== Academic career ==
In November 1873, the Catholic University of Ireland appointed O'Looney as lecturer in Irish language and literature. He subsequently became professor of Irish language, literature and archaeology.

== Personal life and death ==
O'Looney moved to Crumlin, County Dublin, in 1870. In June 1871, he married Siobhán Nic Chuirtín, who was related to the Irish poets Aodh Buí Mac Cruitín and Aindrias Mac Cruitín. They had four children: two daughters and two sons.

He died in Crumlin on 1 December 1901, aged 73.

== Works ==
=== Original works and scholarly publications ===
- A Collection of Poems Written on Different Occasions by the Clare bards in honour of the MacDonnells of Kilkee and Kilrone in the county of Clare,1863.
- The Protecting Corselet of Mary, 1870.
- On the Book of Leinster and its Contents, 1870.
- On Ancient Historic Tales in the Irish Language, 1872.
- On an Old Irish Manuscript, Found in County of Clare, 1893.

=== Editions and translations ===
- Laoi Oisín i dTír na nÓg (The Lay of Oisín in the Land of Youth), by Michael Comyn, 1859.
- Táin Bó Cúailnge (The Cattle Raid of Cooley).
