= Society for the Preservation of the Irish Language =

Cultural organization in Ireland

The Society for the Preservation of the Irish Language (SPIL; Irish: Cumann Buan-Choimeádta na Gaeilge) was a cultural organisation in late 19th-century Ireland, which was part of the Gaelic revival of the period.

It was founded on 29 December 1876. Present at the meeting were Charles Dawson, High Sheriff of Limerick, T. D. Sullivan, editor of The Nation; and Brian O'Looney. Writing in 1937, Douglas Hyde also remembers himself, George Sigerson, Thomas O'Neill Russell, J. J. McSweeney of the Royal Irish Academy, and future MP James O'Connor as being present. Its patron was John MacHale, Archbishop of Tuam, its first president was Lord Francis Conyngham, and its first vice-presidents included Isaac Butt and The O'Conor Don.

Unlike similar organisations of the time, which were antiquarian in nature, the SPIL aimed at protecting the status of the Irish language, which was threatened with extinction at the time. Its mission statement said that it was "possible and desirable to preserve the Irish Language in those parts of the country where it is spoken, with a view to its further extension and cultivation." Hyde wrote that the formation of the society could truly be said to be the first attempt made to recruit the common people to the cause of the Irish language. The society succeeded in having Irish included on the curriculum of primary and secondary schools and third-level colleges in 1878.

The membership of the SPIL included Protestant Ascendancy figures such as Lord de Vesci and Colonel W. E. A. Macdonnell. Horace Plunkett represented the Society at the 1901 Pan-Celtic Congress in Dublin. It took a conciliatory approach to the British government and civil service in pursuing its aims, in contrast to the later Gaelic League, which was anti-British in character.
