= Tadhg Ó Donnchadha =

Irish writer, poet, editor and translator

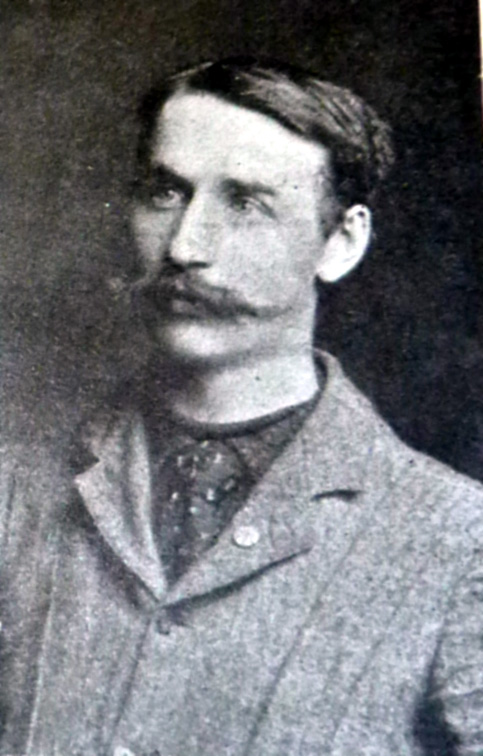
Tadhg Ó Donnchadha in 1902

Tadhg Ó Donnchadha (1874 – 1949) was an Irish writer, poet, editor, translator and a prominent member of the Gaelic League (Conradh na Gaeilge) and the Gaelic Athletic Association. He was editor of Irisleabhar na Gaedhilge (The Gaelic Journal), Professor of Irish in University College Cork and Dean of the Faculty of Celtic Studies.

== Life ==
He was born in Carrignavar, County Cork, which was an Irish-speaking area, and educated there and at St Patrick's Teacher Training College, Drumcondra, Dublin. In 1901 he became editor of the Irish-language newspaper Banba, and also became Irish-language editor of the Freeman's Journal. The following year he also became editor of the Irisleabhar na Gaedhilge (The Gaelic Journal). He wrote under the pseudonym Torna, after Torna Éices.

With Máire Ní Chinnéide, Seán Ó Ceallaigh, and Séamus Ó Braonáin he drew up the first rules for the new game of camogie in 1903. He also invented the name of the game, which comes from the stick used, called a camán.

He first came to notice when he edited the work of Máire Bhuidhe, the folk poet of West Cork and author of "Cath Céim an Fhíodha". In 1905 he published his first book of poems, Leoithne Andeas. When in 1909 publication of the Irisleabhar ceased he took the opportunity to visit Heidelberg University to study Old Irish under Ludwig Mühlhausen. On his return he was appointed Professor of Irish at St. Patrick's College, Drumcondra.

In 1916 he became Professor of Irish and later Dean of the Faculty of Celtic Studies at University College Cork, where he remained until his death. He published a handbook for students on the art of writing Irish poetry, Bhéarsaiocht Ghaeilge (Dublin 1936) and wrote many text books on Irish Grammar. He edited important collections of Irish manuscripts including the poetry of Diarmaid Mac Sheáin Bhuídhe Mac Cárthaigh, published in Dublin 1916.

He was a collector of songs who revitalised interest in the work of West Cork poets Sean Ó Coilean, Doncha Ó Suilleabháin and Michael Chormaic.

He translated a large number of works, fiction and non-fiction, poetry and songs, into Irish, including the Rubaiyat of Omar Khayyam, Molière's Bourgeois gentilhomme, Around the World in Eighty Days, the works of Pádraig Colum, Lady Gregory, George Moore and Jules Verne into Irish. He edited the works of Aodhagán Ó Rathaille (1670–1728) and Pádraigín Haicéad (1600–54), among others.

His last work was Seanfhochail na Mumhan (Dublin 1962). Other works included editions of the poetry of Seán Ó Murchada na Ráithineach for the Gaelic League (Dublin 1907), the poetry of Aodhagáin Ó Rathaille (with Pádraig Ó Duinín) for the Irish Text Society (London 1911) and poetry of An tAth Pádraigín Haicéad (Dublin 1916) and the Leabhair Clainne Aodha Buidhe I, for the Manuscripts Commission (Dublin 1931).

His brother Eamon O’Donoghue was author of Slán le Corcaigh and Drúcht Geal Ceoidh, also a professor of Irish in UCC. Another brother, Donncha O’Donoghue, was Parish Priest of Tracton in Cork. His sister, Cáit Ní Dhonnchadha, was an Irish language and camogie enthusiast.

He had two other Sisters - Nora (1885-1974), married Laurence Wrenne, later Sub-Editor of the Cork Examiner between 1918 and 1934, and Sheila (or Julia) (1876-1951), a twin of Eamon O’Donoghue, married to Patrick Forde in 1909.

== Legacy ==
He died on 23 October 1949 and was buried in Saint Fin Barre's Cathedral in Cork. The attendance at his funeral included Éamon de Valera. The Southern Star described him as "acknowledged peer of writers of Irish poetry, the gentlest and most unpretentious of Corkmen, the great Tórna, whose name was heard of everywhere readers of Irish are to be found at home or overseas."
