= Ithaca Kitty =

Plush toy cat

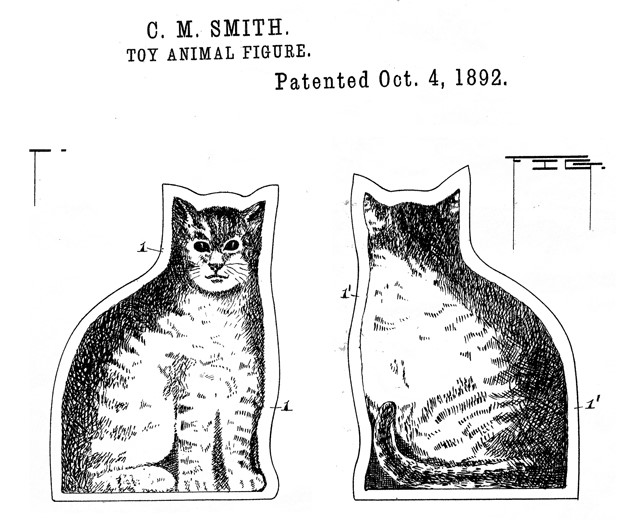
Patent for the Ithaca Kitty, 1892

The Ithaca Kitty, originally known as "The Tabby Cat", was a popular stuffed toy in the United States which started a fad for plush toys that lasted from its introduction in 1892 until after World War I.

== History ==
The Ithaca Kitty was inspired by a gray tabby cat named Caesar Grimalkin in Ithaca, New York. The cat's owners, William Hazlitt Smith and Celia Smith, had the cat photographed and had Celia's sister-in-law, Charity Smith, paint a likeness of the cat onto a three-piece pattern designed by Celia. Although Caesar Grimalkin was a polydactyl cat with seven toes on each front paw, the Smiths felt that four toes appeared more normal and used four toes in the toy design. The Smiths patented the design and construction of the toy in October 1892.

The design was sold by the Smiths for one cent a yard to Arnold Print Works. Arnold Print Works initially offered $25 (equivalent to $896 in 2025) for the design, but the Smiths rejected this offer, instead being paid in one cent per yard of fabric sold. Arnold Print Works then sold the printed pattern as "The Tabby Cat" on half a yard of muslin for ten cents (equivalent to $4 in 2025) each in late 1892. Nearly 200,000 were sold that first holiday season. The toy was very successful nationwide, making appearances at the 1893 Chicago World's Fair and in the windows of Wanamaker's department store in Philadelphia. The toy's success led to other stuffed animals, including kittens, dogs, and bunnies. The Ithaca Kitty was especially known for its lifelike appearance and was used by farmers to scare away birds and by the Central Park police station to scare mice. Writer Eugene Field wrote a letter to Celia Smith stating that the calico cat in his poem "The Duel" was inspired by the Ithaca Kitty.

In 2017, the Ithaca History Center reissued the Ithaca Kitty, with retired teacher Phyllis Smith-Hansen leading production. The modern version of the toy has the polydactylous toes of Caesar that were left out of the original design. Smith-Hansen also recruited author Rebecca Barry to write a children's fiction book about the Caesar. Rod Howe, the director of the History Center, described the Ithaca Kitty as a "Tompkins County Heritage Ambassador".

== See also ==
- Teddy bear
- Sock monkey
