= Brewer's Dictionary of Phrase and Fable =

Reference work

The 18th edition of the dictionary, published in 2009

Brewer's Dictionary of Phrase and Fable, sometimes referred to simply as Brewer's, is a reference work containing definitions and explanations of many famous phrases, allusions, and figures, whether historical or mythical.

The "New Edition revised, corrected, and enlarged" from 1895 is now in the public domain, and web-based versions are available online.

The most recent version is the 20th edition, published in November 2018 by Chambers Harrap Publishers.

== History ==
Originally published in 1870 by Cassell, Petter & Galpin and written by the Reverend E. Cobham Brewer, it was aimed at the growing number of people who wanted to understand the origins of phrases and historical or literary allusions, but did not have a university education. The 'phrase' part of the title refers mainly to the explanation of various idioms and proverbs, while the "fable" part might more accurately be labelled "folklore" and ranges from classical mythology to relatively recent literature. On top of this, Brewer added notes on important historical figures and events, and other things which he thought would be of interest, such as Roman numerals. Brewer's provides information often not included in more traditional dictionaries and encyclopaedias. A "New Edition revised, corrected, and enlarged" of 1440 pages was published by the author in 1895, not long before he died. Since then, it has been continually republished, in revised and updated editions.

=== Editions ===
- 1st (1870): E. Cobham Brewer
  - (several times reprinted, mostly with no date)
- "New Edition revised, corrected, and enlarged" (1895): E. Cobham Brewer
  - (reprints: 1896, 1897, 1898, 1900, 1901, 1902, 1904, 1905, 1906, 1907, 1909, and others with no date)
- 2nd (1953)
- 3rd (1954)
- 4th (1956)
- 5th (1959)
- 6th (1962)
- 7th (1963)
- 8th (1963)
- 9th (1965): John Freeman
- 10th (1968)
- 11th "Centenary Edition" (1970), revised by Ivor H. Evans. ISBN 0304935700
- 14th (1989)
- 15th (1995): Adrian Room. ISBN 0062701339
- 16th "Millenium Edition" (1999): Adrian Room. ISBN 0304345997
- 17th (2005): John Ayto. ISBN 0304357839
- 18th (2009): Camilla Rockwood. ISBN 9780550104113
- 19th (2012): Susie Dent. ISBN 9780550102454
- 20th (2018): Susie Dent. ISBN 9781473676367

== Brewer's Dictionary of Modern Phrase and Fable ==
This retitled and updated version, initially edited by Adrian Room, was first published in 2000 (ISBN 978-0304350964). A second edition (ISBN 978-0550105646), edited by Ian Crofton and John Ayto, was published on 30 November 2010. While this title is based on the structure of Brewer's Dictionary of Phrase and Fable, it contains entries from 1900 onwards and exists alongside its parent volume as a separate work.

== Other special editions ==
A variety of spin-off editions have been published in the past, some straying quite far from the theme of 'phrase and fable', such as Brewer's Dictionary of Cinema (1997) and William Donaldson's A–Z of 'roguish Britons', Brewer's Rogues, Villains and Eccentrics (2002). Brewer's Dictionary of London Phrase and Fable was published in 2009 and Brewer's Dictionary of Irish Phrase and Fable was reissued at the same time.

== See also ==
- A Guide to the Scientific Knowledge of Things Familiar – also by E. Cobham Brewer
