= The Duel (poem) =

Poem by Eugene Field

"The Duel" is a poem by American humorist and children's writer Eugene Field. It shares subject matter with the poem, a limerick in some versions and a seven-line extended limerick in others, "There Once Were Two Cats from Kilkenny".

The duel described in the text is between a gingham dog and a calico cat, with a Chinese plate and an old Dutch clock as very unwilling witnesses, whom the poem's narrator credits for having described the events to him. The dueling animals, explains the narrator, eventually eat each other up and thus are both destroyed, causing the duel to end in a draw.

Field said the calico cat in the poem was inspired by the Ithaca Kitty, which debuted in 1892, meaning the poem was written between 1892 and 1895, when Field died.

It inspired the 1993 album and its title track, The Gingham Dog and the Calico Cat, by Chet Atkins and Amy Grant.
