= Brewer's Rogues, Villains and Eccentrics =

- The paperback cover
- Author: William Donaldson
- Language: English
- Subject: Reference/Humour
- Publisher: Phoenix
- Publication date: 26 September 2002
- Publication place: United Kingdom
- Media type: Hardback
- Pages: 686
- ISBN: 0-7538-1791-8

Brewer's Rogues, Villains, & Eccentrics: An A-Z of Roguish Britons Through the Ages is a reference book first published by Brewer's in 2002, edited and compiled by William Donaldson.

The book is an esoteric look at some of the wild characters emanating from the United Kingdom and has been described as "a work of maniacal genius". It featured entries on eccentrics and rogues famous, infamous and little-known, including Beauchamp Bagenal, Lord Berners, John Aspinall and John Wilkes. Some entries, such as that on George Best, reflect a certain cynicism about media-created rogues.

== See also ==
- Brewer's Dictionary of Phrase and Fable
