= Hermann Wilhelm Ebel =

German philologist (1820–1875)

Hermann Wilhelm Ebel (10 May 1820 – 19 August 1875) was a German philologist.

== Biography ==
Ebel was born in Berlin. He displayed in his early years a remarkable capacity for the study of languages, and at the same time a passionate fondness for music and poetry.

At the age of sixteen he became a student at the University of Berlin, applying himself especially to philology, and attending the lectures of August Böckh. Music continued to be the favorite occupation of his leisure hours, and he pursued the study of it under the direction of Joseph Marx.

In the spring of 1838 he passed to the University of Halle, and there began to apply himself to comparative philology under August Pott. Returning in the following year to his native city, he continued this study as a disciple of Franz Bopp. He took his degree in 1842, and, after spending his year of probation at the French Gymnasium of Berlin, he resumed with great earnestness his language studies.

About 1847 he began to study Old Persian. In 1852 he accepted a professorship at the Beheim-Schwarzbach Institution at Filehne, a post he held for six years. It was during this period that his studies in the Proto-Slavic and Celtic languages began. In 1858 he removed to Schneidemühl, and there he discharged the duties of first professor for ten years. He was afterwards called to the chair of comparative philology at the University of Berlin. He died at Misdroy on 19 August 1875.

The most important work of Ebel in the field of Celtic philology is his revised edition of the Grammatica Celtica of Professor Johann Zeuss, completed in 1871. This had been preceded by his treatises De verbi Britannici futuro ac conjunctivo (1866), and De Zeussii curis positis in Grammatica Celtica (1869). He made many learned contributions to Kuhn's Zeitschrift für vergleichende Sprachforschung, and to August Schleicher's Beitrage zur vergleichenden Sprachforschung; and a selection of these contributions was translated into English by Sullivan, and published under the title of Celtic Studies (1863). Ebel contributed the Old Irish section to Schleicher's Indogermanische Chrestomathie (1869). Among his other works must be named Die Lehnworter der deutschen Sprache (1856).
