= Marianne Colston =

English travel writer

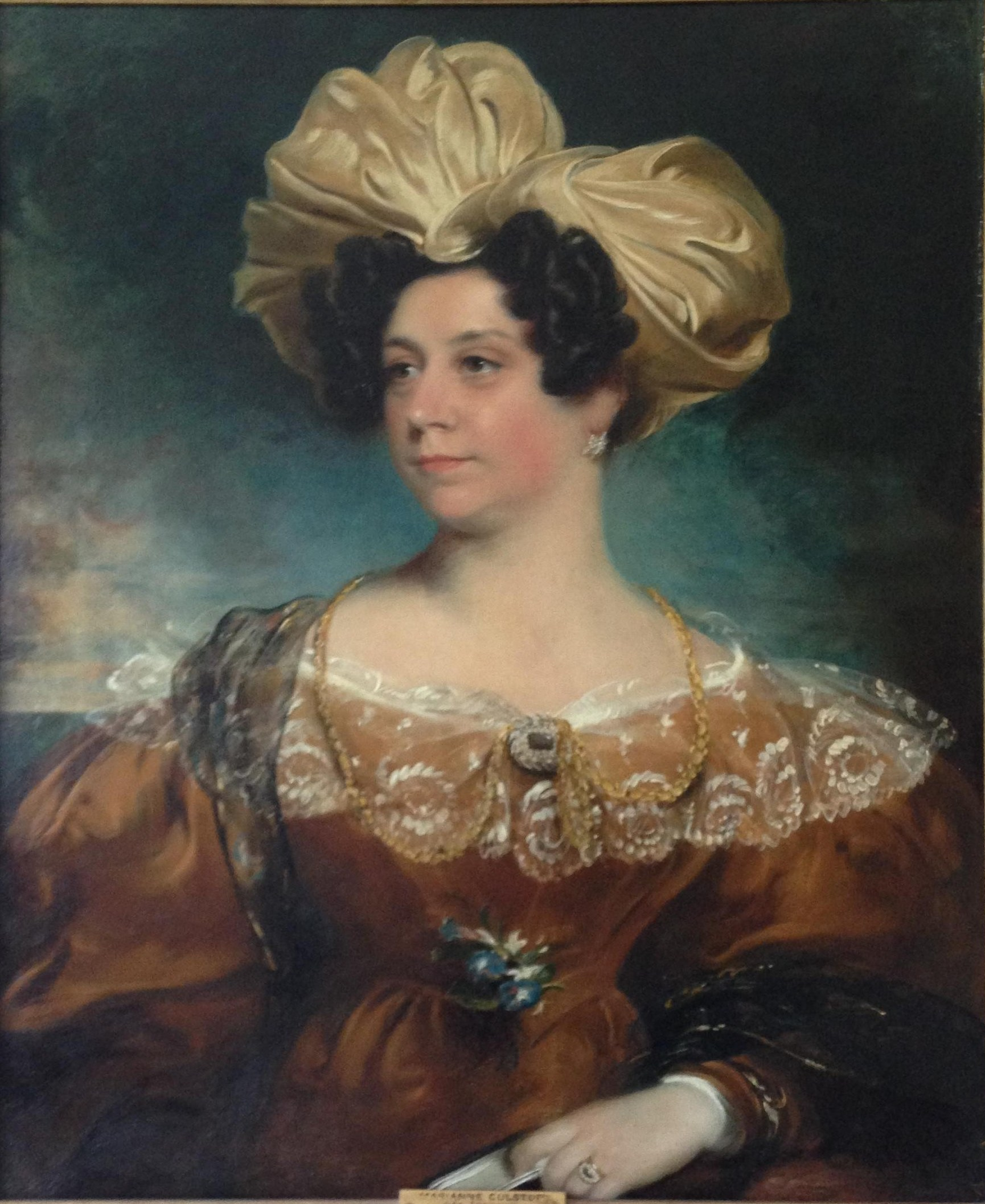
- Portrait of Mrs Colston by James Godsell Middleton (c. 1830)
- Born: 1792; Bristol
- Died: 3 October 1865 (aged 73); Roundway House, Wiltshire
- Notable work: Journal of a Tour in France, Switzerland, and Italy (1822)
- Spouse: Edward Francis Colston (m. 1819; died 1847)
- Children: 4

Marianne Colston (née Jenkins; 1792–1865) was an English heiress, travel writer, and amateur draughtswoman.

== Life ==
Marianne Jenkins was born in 1792, the daughter and heiress of William Jenkins (c. 1751–1837), of Shepton Mallet, Somerset, by his wife Sarah Jenkins, née Watkin. On 1 November 1819, she married Edward Francis Colston (1795–1847), descendent and heir of the wealthy Bristol merchant and philanthropist, Edward Colston.

Following their marriage, the couple immediately embarked on the continental tour which formed the basis of her only work, Journal of a Tour. In the course of the tour, Marianne gave birth to their first child, Arabella Sarah (1820–1891). The marriage produced three more children: Edward (1822–1864), William Jenkins Craig (1824–1867), and Samuel Hunt (1825–1854).

After returning from France in 1822, the Colstons lived for a time in Somersetshire before moving into Filkins Hall, a Colston property in Oxfordshire. They subsequently dwelt for 'some years' at Weymouth, before purchasing Roundway House, Wiltshire in May 1840.

After the death of her husband in 1847, Marianne remained at Roundway House, and was mistress of the property: the North Wiltshire census of 1861 describes her as a 'landed proprietor' and head of a household that then included two of her sons and a daughter-in-law, two granddaughters and a grandson, three visitors, and fourteen servants. She died on 3 October 1865, aged 73.

== Journal of a Tour ==
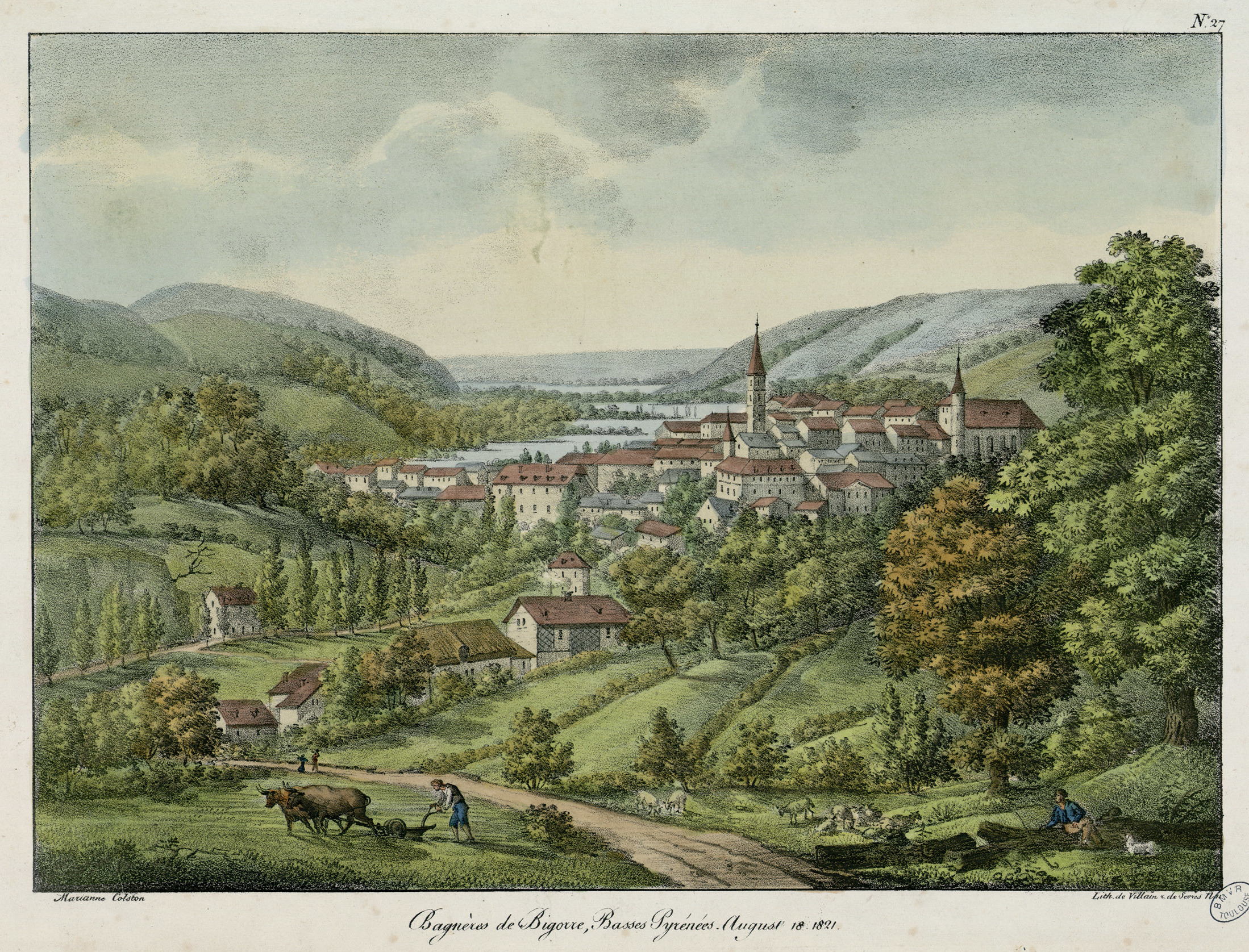
Bagnères de Bigorre, Basses Pyrénées. August 18. 1821.

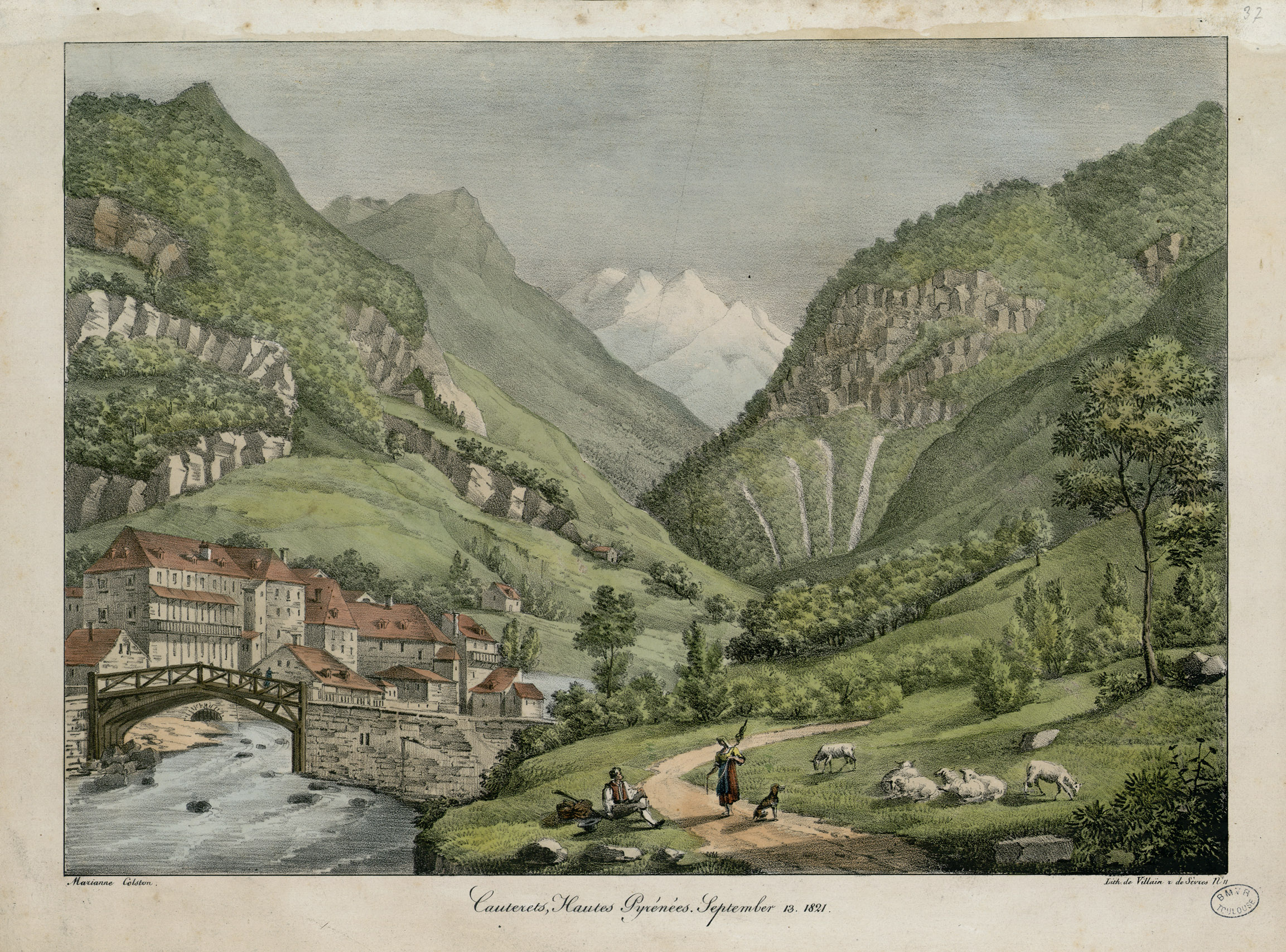
Cauterets, Hautes-Pyrénées. September 13. 1821.

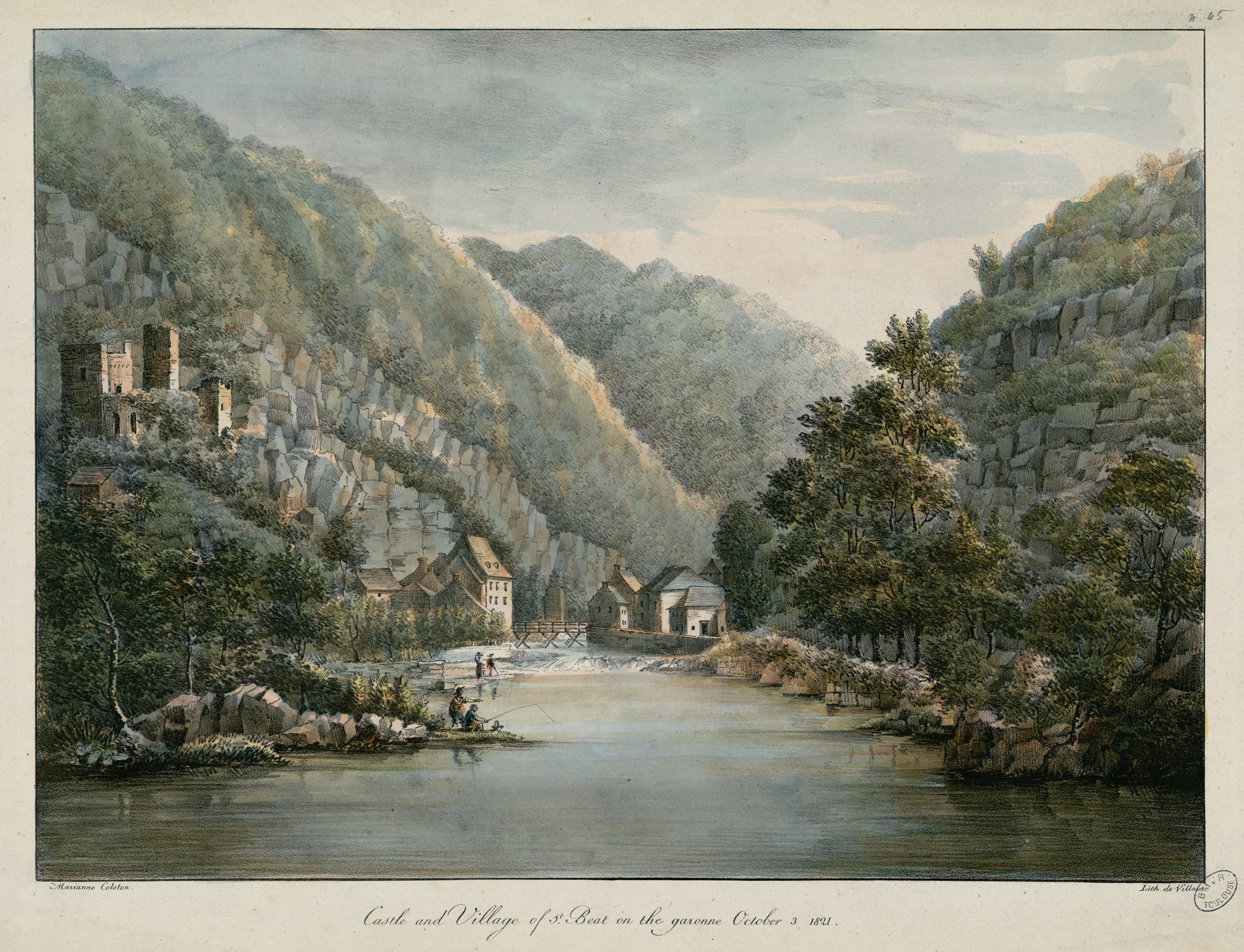
Château and village of Saint-Béat on the Garonne. October 3. 1821.

In Paris, near the end of the European tour, Marianne prepared her journal for publication; the first volume was on the printing press while Colston was still writing up her closing remarks on her return visit to Paris in 1822. François Le Villain (fl. 1820–30) created lithographs based on her drawings of various scenes from the journey, which filled an additional folio volume accompanying the two-volume octavo Journal. The work was published by A. and W. Galignani in Paris in 1822.

The Journal was reprinted by Whittaker in London in 1823:

- Journal of a Tour in France, Switzerland, and Italy, during the Years 1819, 20, and 21. Illustrated by Fifty Lithographic Prints, from Original Drawings, Taken in Italy, the Alps, and the Pyrenees. By Marianne Colston. In Two Volumes. London: Printed for G. and W. B. Whittaker, Ave-Maria Lane. 1823. Printed by Weed and Rider, Little Britain, London.

The plates were again published in a companion folio volume:

- Plates Illustrative of a Journal of a Tour in France, Switzerland, and Italy, from Original Drawings Taken in France, the Alps, and the Pyrenees. London: G. & W. B. Whittaker, 1823.

=== Reviews ===
The book was reviewed by:

- The London Literary Gazette 311 (January 1823): pp. 1–2;
- Blackwood's Edinburgh Magazine 12 (February 1823): pp. 231–36;
- The European Magazine 83 (July 1823): pp. 69–72;
- The Monthly Review 102 (November 1823): pp. 305–15;
- Galignani's Magazine and Paris Monthly Review 6.23 (December 1823): pp. 242–48 [reprint of The Monthly Review];
- Heidelberger Jahrbücher der Literatur 2.51 (1825): 815–16, continued in 2.52 (1825): pp. 817–26;
- Neue allgemeine geographische und statistische ephemeriden 19 (1826): p. 311 [signed 'G. H.'].
