= Adrian Room =

British toponymist and onomastician

Adrian Richard West Room (27 September 1933, Melksham – 6 November 2010, Stamford, Lincolnshire) was a British toponymist and onomastician, a Fellow of the Royal Geographical Society and a prolific author of reference works relating primarily to the origins of words and place-names.

Between 1952 and 1979, Room served in the Royal Naval Reserve, Special Branch, retiring as a lieutenant commander. Before becoming a full-time author, he was employed at King's College School, Cambridge, where he taught modern languages and was a senior house master. He later, until 1984, worked as a senior lecturer in Russian for the Ministry of Defence.

== Selected publications ==
- Place-Names of the World. London: Routledge & Kegan Paul, 1974.
- Place-name changes since 1900: A world gazetteer. London: Routledge & Kegan Paul, 1980. ISBN 0710007027
- Naming Names: Stories of Pseudonyms and Name Changes with a Who's Who. London: Routledge & Kegan Paul, 1981. ISBN 0710009208
- Dictionary of Trade Name Origins. London: Routledge & Kegan Paul, 1982. ISBN 0710008392
- Brewer's Dictionary of Modern Phrase & Fable. 2000. (editor) ISBN 9780304350964
- Cassell's Foreign Words and Phrases. London: Cassell & Co., 2000. ISBN 0304350087
- A. to Z. of British Life
- Dictionary of Confusable Words
- Bloomsbury Dictionary of Place Names in the British Isles
- A Dictionary of True Etymologies
- Who's Who in Classical Mythology
- Dictionary of Pseudonyms: 13,000 Assumed Names and Their Origins (this edition was published after his death)
- Cassell's Dictionary of Word Histories
- Dictionary of Irish Place Names
- Cassell's Dictionary of First Names
- The Guinness Book of Numbers
- Room's Dictionary of distinguishables
- Ntc's Dictionary of Changes in Meaning
- The Fascinating Origins of Everyday Words
- Brewer's dictionary of names
- Tuttle dictionary of dedications
- Room's Dictionary of Differences
- Concise dictionary of word origins
- Ntc's Dictionary of Word Origins
- Dictionary of Confusing Words and Meanings
- Dunces, Gourmands & Petticoats
- Cassell Dictionary of Proper Names
- A Concise Dictionary of Modern Place Names in Great Britain and Ireland
- Dictionary of Changes in Meaning
- Nicknames of Places: Origins And Meanings of the Alternate And Secondary
- Dictionary of Coin Names. London: Routledge & Kegan Paul, 1987. ISBN 0710206461
- African Placenames
- Dictionary of Translated Names and Titles
- Dictionary of Cryptic Crossword Clues
- Dictionary of Dedications
- Room's Classical Dictionary
- The Street Names of England
- The Hutchinson Pocket Dictionary of Confusible Words
- Dictionary of Astronomical Names
- A dictionary of contrasting pairs
- The Naming of Animals
- A Dictionary of Art Titles
- Guide to British Place Names
- Dictionary of World Place-names Derived from English Names
- The Pronunciation of Placenames: A Worldwide Dictionary
- Dictionary of place-names in the British Isles
- A Dictionary of Music Titles
- Alternate Names of Places: A Worldwide Dictionary
- Ntc's Dictionary of Trade Name Origins
- Placenames of France
- Bloomsbury Dictionary of Dedications
- Literally Entitled
- Encyclopedia of corporate names worldwide
- Ntc's Classical Dictionary
- Cassell's Dictionary of Modern American History
- Hutchinson Pocket Dictionary of First Names
- The Hutchinson Pocket Dictionary of Place Names
- Placenames of Russia and the Former Soviet Union
- Room's Dictionary of Distinguishables and Confusibles
- An Alphabetical Guide to the Language of Name Studies
- Dictionary Of British Place Names
