= William Donaldson =

British satirist, writer, playboy (1935–2005)

- Born: 4 January 1935
- Died: 22 June 2005 (aged 70)
- Occupations: Satirist; writer
- Spouses: Sonia Avory (m. 1957, divorced); Claire Gordon (m. 1968, divorced); Cherry Hatrick (m. 1986)
- Children: 1
- Writing career
- Pen name: Henry Root
- Notable work: The Henry Root Letters

Charles William Donaldson (4 January 1935 – 22 June 2005) was a British satirist, writer, playboy and, under the pseudonym of Henry Root, author of The Henry Root Letters.

== Life and career ==
Son of Charles Glen Donaldson (1904–1956) and Elizabeth (née Stockley; d. 1955), Donaldson enjoyed a privileged upbringing in Sunningdale, Berkshire. His father was Managing Director of the Glasgow-based family shipping line, Donaldson Line, which until its sale in the early 1960s, was one of the largest passenger lines in the world. He was educated at Winchester College (where he first met Julian Mitchell) and Magdalene College, Cambridge. He spent some money supporting young writers such as his contemporaries Ted Hughes and Sylvia Plath. He completed his National Service in the Royal Navy in the late 1950s, reaching the rank of Sub-Lieutenant.

On his return to civilian life, Donaldson became associated with the set surrounding Princess Margaret, Countess of Snowdon, and worked as a theatrical producer. He established himself as a central player in the British satire boom of the early 1960s, as co-producer, with Donald Albery, of Beyond the Fringe (1960), and of dramatisations of J. P. Donleavy's The Ginger Man (1959) and Spike Milligan's The Bed-Sitting Room (1963). The pair earned a weekly £2,000 from Beyond the Fringe while the performers Peter Cook, Dudley Moore, Alan Bennett and Jonathan Miller were earning only £75.

In 1968, Donaldson received a substantial inheritance, and in 1971 he left Britain for Ibiza, where he imprudently spent his last £2,000 on a glass-bottomed boat. Before long he was scavenging for food on the beach. Returning to London, he found refuge with a former girlfriend who was running a brothel on Fulham Road. His experiences there formed the basis of his first novel, Both the Ladies and the Gentlemen (1975).

Donaldson's fictional letter-writer Henry Root made him a final fortune. Root's satirical lampooning of the rich, famous, and influential was published in the books:

- The Henry Root Letters (1980) – with letters to, among others, famous football clubs, publishers, chief constables, Margaret Thatcher, politicians, newspaper editors, and, on 17 April 1979, to the First Sea Lord (volunteering his services owing to the "imminent outbreak of hostilities with the Soviets" and concluding "I'm on red alert here and can leave for my ship at the drop of a bollard")
- The Further Letters of Henry Root (1980)
- Henry Root's World of Knowledge (1982)
- Henry Root's A-Z of Women: "The Definitive Guide" (1985)
- The Soap Letters (1988)
- Root into Europe (1992)
- Root about Britain (1994)

Donaldson lived at 139 Elm Park Mansions on Park Walk, Chelsea, London SW10, from which address all the Root letters were sent. Nearby, The Henry Root restaurant has been established in his memory.

Donaldson's biographical survey of roguish Britons through the ages, Brewer's Rogues, Villains and Eccentrics (2002), has been described as "a breathtaking triumph of misdirected scholarship".

Donaldson also wrote novels including the semi-autobiographical 'Is This Allowed'. In the 1990s he also had a column in The Independent.

The phenomenal success of the Henry Root books, especially the first, enabled Donaldson to resume his earlier chaotic lifestyle, and in the mid-1980s he began using crack cocaine. He continued its use for more than a decade, but insisted he was not addicted.

Donaldson also wrote under other names, including Dr Kit Bryson, Jean-Luc Legris, and Selina Fitzherbert (who "together" wrote The Complete Naff Guide (1983) and other related books; Donaldson's co-author was Simon Carr, who would write an obituary of Donaldson for The Independent), Talbot Church, and Liz Reed.

=== Personal life ===
Donaldson married Sonia Avory in 1957 and they had a son named Charlie. He left her for Jacki Ellis, then the wife of Jeffrey Bernard, but in due course she left him. A sequence of affairs followed, including liaisons with Sarah Miles and Carly Simon. He left Miles for Simon, whom he described as "the answer to any sane man's prayers; funny, quick, erotic, extravagantly talented", but this did not prevent him from jilting her while they were engaged and returning to Miles. In 1968, Donaldson inherited another fortune and married Claire Gordon. The couple epitomised 1960s Swinging London. He later remembered that "sex, whether in company or not, has been the only department in life in which I have demanded from anyone taking part the very highest standards of seriousness." Donaldson's third marriage, in 1986, was to Cherry Hatrick, who survived him; they separated six months after their marriage.
