= Johann Kaspar Zeuss =

German historian (1806–1856)

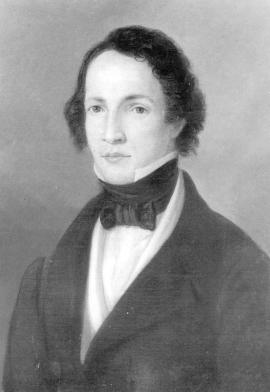
- Johann Kaspar Zeuss
- Born: 22 July 1806; Kronach, Bavaria
- Died: 10 November 1856 (aged 50); Kronach, Bavaria
- Other names: Zeuß, Johann Kaspar
- Occupation: German linguist

Johann Kaspar Zeuss (or Zeuß, 22 July 1806 – 10 November 1856) was a German historian and founder of Celtic philology. He is credited with demonstrating that the Celtic languages belong to the Indo-European group.

== Life ==
Zeuss was born in Kronach, Upper Franconia, and studied at the gymnasium of Bamberg. His parents wished him to enter the priesthood, but he chose a scholarly career, inclining particularly to historical and linguistic studies. He entered the Ludwig-Maximilians-Universität München and after graduating, taught at the gymnasium there. In 1837, his book Die Herkunft der Baiern von den Markomannen (The Descent of the Bavarians from the Markomans), brought him an honorary PhD from the University of Erlangen. The same year, he went to Speyer to teach history at the lyceum and remained there until 1847, when he accepted a professorship of history at the Ludwig-Maximilians-Universität München. This he resigned on account of poor health and was transferred to the lyceum in Bamberg. In 1853, there appeared his monumental Grammatica Celtica, which brought him fame. Two years after he took a leave of absence to recover his health, but he died in Kronach the following year.

== Influence ==
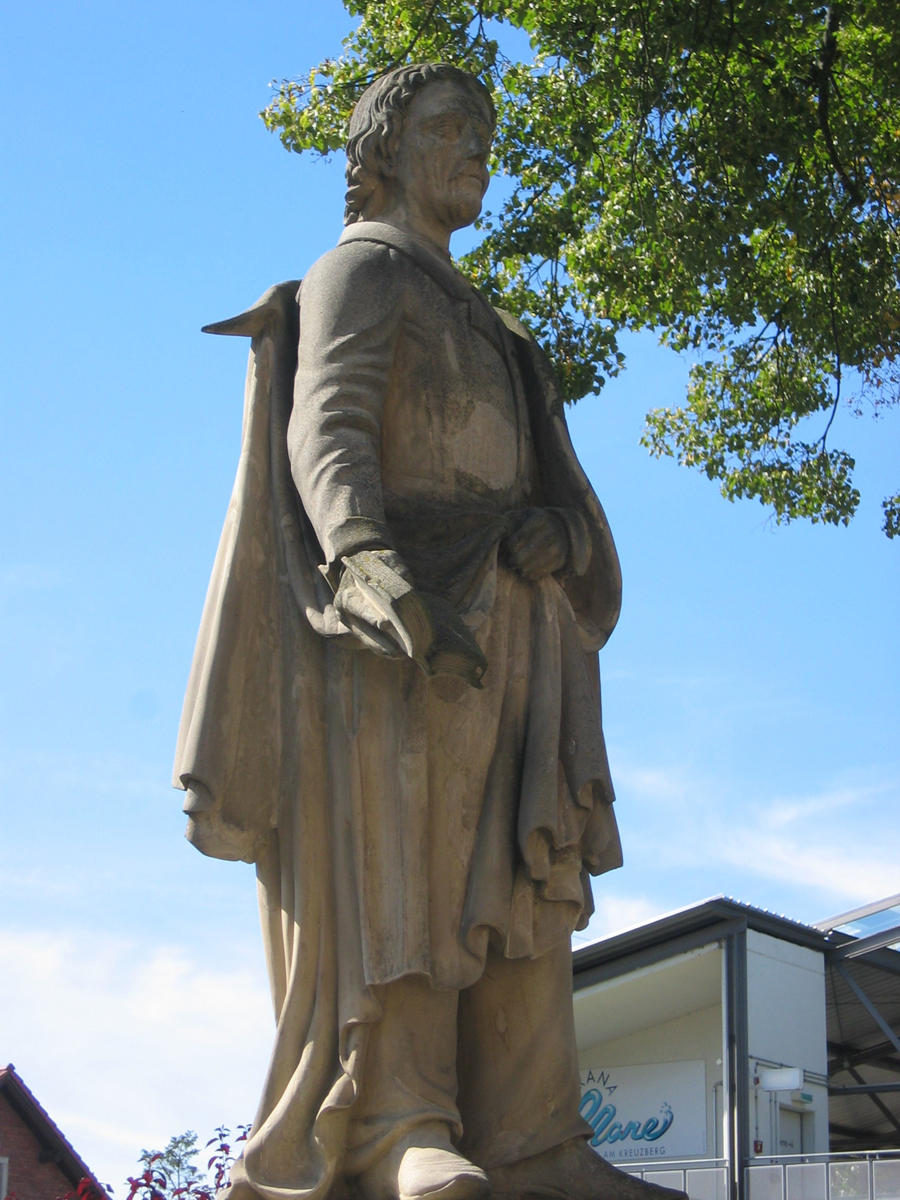
Statue of Zeuss in Kronach.

Zeuss was a scholar of great erudition, combining a knowledge of philology with history and ethnology. His Germanic studies had taught him the necessity of knowing Celtic languages, and he went to work to investigate this neglected field. To get at the sources, the old manuscripts, particularly those in Old Irish, he journeyed to Karlsruhe, Würzburg, St. Gallen, Milan, London, and Oxford, and everywhere made extracts or copies. Both ancient and modern dialects received his attention. His Grammatica Celtica proved beyond doubt that the Celtic languages were a group of the Indo-European family, which put Celtic philology on a sound scientific basis. After the author's death, the work was revised and re-edited by Hermann Ebel (Berlin, 1871). Other works by Zeuss are Traditiones possessionesque Wirzenburgenses (1842) and Die Freie Reichstadt Speyer vor ihrer Zerstörung (The Free Imperial City of Speyer before its Destruction).

De Barra (2018, page 26) writes that Zeuss "brought rigorous scientific methodologies and a sense of scholarly gravitas to the study of indigenous languages of Britain and Ireland....something the field had lacked before....in his wake universities in Britain and Europe devoted more resources to the study of Celtic matters".

== See also ==
- List of people on the postage stamps of Ireland

Attribution
