= Thomas O'Neill Russell =

Irish writer

- Born: 1828; Moate, Ireland
- Died: 1908 (aged 79–80); Dublin, Ireland
- Occupation: Novelist

Thomas O'Neill Russell (1828–1908) was an Irish novelist and a founding member of Conradh na Gaeilge.

== Life ==
He was born in Moate, County Westmeath, the son of Joseph Russell, a Quaker farmer. He interested himself in the Irish language from the 1850s. He emigrated to the United States in 1867 and returned to Ireland in 1895.

He began to organise opinion in Dublin, by means of essay and lecture in the interests of a Gaelic revival. To his efforts to arouse in Irishmen a sense of the value of their ancient language and music was largely due the inauguration of the Gaelic League in 1893 and of the first Feis Ceoil (Irish musical festival) in 1897.

He died on 15 June 1908 in Synge St., Dublin, and was buried in Mount Jerome Cemetery.

== Select works ==
- The Adventures of Dick Massey, or the Battles of a Boy (Dublin: James Duffy 1860; Gill, new ed. 1908)
- True Heart’s Trials, a Tale of Ireland and America (Dublin: M .H. Gill 1872; rep. 1910); (1904)
- Red Hugh, Or the Life and Death of Hugh Roe O’Donnell, Lord of Tyrconnell (Dublin: M. H. Gill 1905).
