= Ossianic Society =

The Ossianic Society was an Irish literary society founded in Dublin on St. Patrick's Day, 1853, taking its name from the poetic material associated with the ancient narrator Oisín.

== History ==
Founding members included John O'Daly, William Elliot Hudson, John Edward Pigot, Owen Connellan, John Windele and William Smith O'Brien, the antiquary Standish Hayes O'Grady was a principal member and later became its president. By 1860 the list of subscribers numbered 746, six volumes of Transactions were produced, and the preparations for further issues were extant when it ceased operations in 1863.

The group of Irish scholars emerged from competing societies, such as the Celtic Society and the Irish Archaeological Society, focusing on the translation of Irish literature from the "Fenian period of Irish history", specifically, the mythological works of Oisín and the Fianna, and the revival of the Irish language. The manifesto stipulated the membership be entirely composed of Irish scholars, the intent being to distinguish itself from similar societies that catered to Anglo-Irish landlords' interests and influence. Though such societies had credible scholars as steering members the work produced was thought to be influenced by the local ascendancy and their royal (English) patrons.

The correspondence of members of the Society reveals a fractious relationship with other important figures of the time, Eugene O'Curry and those of the Royal Irish Academy, and were often frustrated in their attempts to access early manuscripts.
