= Agnes O'Farrelly =

Irish academic and novelist

Professor Agnes O'Farrelly MA
- Úna Ní Fhaircheallaigh
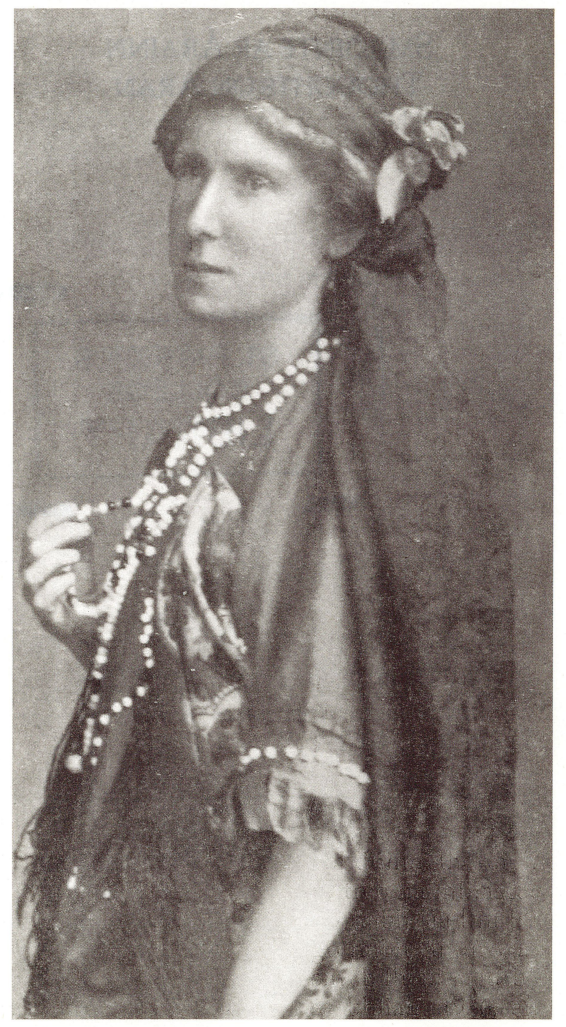
- Born: Agnes Winifred Farrelly; 24 June 1874; Raffony, near Virginia, County Cavan, Ireland
- Died: 5 November 1951 (aged 77); Dublin, Ireland
- Resting place: Deansgrange Cemetery, Dublin
- Education: St Mary's University College; Royal University of Ireland
- Occupations: Academic, professor, poet, writer
- Writing career
- Pen name: Uan Uladh
- Language: Irish, English
- Notable works: Smaointe Ar Árainn; Out of the Depths
- Movement: Irish Literary Revival

Agnes O'Farrelly (born Agnes Winifred Farrelly; 24 June 1874 – 5 November 1951; Irish: Úna Ní Fhaircheallaigh [ˈuːnˠə n̠ʲiː ˈaɾʲ(ç)əl̪ˠiː]), also known by her nom-de-plume Uan Uladh, was an academic and professor of Irish at University College Dublin (UCD). She was also the first female Irish-language novelist, a founding member of Cumann na mBan, and fourth president of the Camogie Association.

== Early life ==
Agnes Winifred Farrelly was born 24 June 1874 in Raffony House, Virginia, County Cavan, one of five daughters and three sons of Peter Dominic and Ann (née Sheridan) Farrelly. Her first published work was a series of saccharine-sweet articles in the Anglo-Celt in January–March 1895, Glimpses of Breffni and Meath, appeared, after which the editor, Edward O'Hanlon encouraged her to study literature.

In February 1887, she signed up to the "Irish Fireside Club", a new column in the Weekly Freeman edited by Rose Kavanagh, symptomatic of the expanding field of children's literature during the fin de siècle.

This club boasted over 60,000 child members during its height, and facilitated the mass-indoctrination of a generation of Irish children into the cultural nationalist movement. She was to become the most vocal female within this club, which moulded her utopian, feminist and nationalist thought throughout adulthood.

== Academic career ==
As soon as she became financially independent, she enrolled in St Mary's University College, (Muckross Park College) in Dublin, and she duly convinced her College Principal to enlist the college's first ever Irish language lecturer so that she could study the language as part of her Arts Degree.

Eoin MacNeill, Vice-President of the Gaelic League, the main cultural nationalist body in operation in Ireland since 1893, was recruited and a class was set up, with Farrelly (or O'Farrelly as she then became known) encouraging young women from other women's colleges in Dublin to attend.

Through this initiative, a core group of middle-class and educated female cultural nationalists emerged in the capital city, including Máire Ní Chinnéide and Mary E.L. Butler, who, like O'Farrelly, would go on to play major roles in the Gaelic League's development through the first two decades of the twentieth century, as literary figures, educationalists and language activists.

She graduated from the Royal University of Ireland (BA 1899, MA 1900), and spent a term in Paris studying under Henri D'Arbois de Jubainville, professor of Celtic in the Collège de France. She was the first woman to have studied Celtic to such an advanced level. O'Farrelly was appointed a lecturer in Irish at Alexandra and Loreto colleges, and also taught Irish in the Central Branch of the Gaelic League.

She convinced Mary Hayden to apply for the Royal University's Senior Fellowship, in an effort to challenge the view that female scholars were ineligible for such awards. In 1902, along with Hayden, she helped found the Irish Association of Women Graduates and Candidate Graduates, to promote equal opportunity in university education. She gave evidence to the Robertson (1902) and Fry (1906) commissions on Irish university education, arguing successfully for full co-education at UCD.

== Gaelic League ==
During the summer of 1898, when O'Farrelly had then finished her second year of study at St. Mary's College, Eoin MacNeill arranged for her to visit Inis Meáin, the middle of the Aran Islands, to improve her Irish. Over the next five summers which she spent on Inis Meáin, she became fluent in the Irish language and in August 1899 she founded 'The Women's Branch' of the Gaelic League, a year after a men's branch of the Gaelic League was established in both Inis Mór and Inis Meáin. This branch provided the first dedicated leisure time that the island women experienced.

When she returned from the Aran Islands in the autumn of 1898, she signed up to the Central Branch of the Gaelic League in Dublin and soon became a member of its executive committee and the most influential female member of the Gaelic League until 1915. Throughout her early involvement in the Gaelic League, O'Farrelly promoted her women's agenda amongst her influential male colleagues. If anything, this enhanced her popularity, which was testified to when she topped the poll in 1903 and 1904. She was one of the most active and diligent language activists at this time.

In 1907, O'Farrelly became chairperson of Coiste an Oideachais [Educational Committee] of the Gaelic League, having relinquished her role as advising Intermediate examiner in Celtic. Her chief role was to mediate between the diverging views on educational policy within the Gaelic League and to appease elements of the clergy whilst still campaigning for the promotion of Irish within the educational system. According to Roger Casement, it was O'Farrelly who convinced the Commissioner of National Education, Dr. Starkie, of the merits of the bilingual programme in national schools, a programme initiated in 1904 in 27 schools.

== Political activity ==
She presided at the inaugural meeting of Cumann na mBan in 1914, supporting its having a subordinate role in relation to the Irish Volunteers. O'Farrelly left the organisation that year over the issue of Irishmen joining the British Army during World War I. She did however remain active in the Gaelic League.

In 1916, along with Maurice Moore, she gathered a petition that unsuccessfully sought a reprieve of the death sentence of her close friend Roger Casement. She was a member of a committee of women which negotiated unsuccessfully with IRA leaders to avoid civil war in 1922.

She was defeated as an independent candidate for the NUI constituency in the general elections of 1923 and June 1927.

== Camogie president ==
Her great legacy to camogie is the Ashbourne Cup. A founder member in 1914 and president (1914–51) of the University College Dublin camogie club, it was O'Farrelly who persuaded William Gibson (the second Lord Ashbourne), to donate a cup for the inter-collegiate camogie competition instituted in 1915.

She was appointed honorary president, first of the Ulster Camogie Association and then the Camogie Association in 1934 alongside Maire Gill, who continued to chair central council and congress. She opposed the divisive ban on hockey introduced by the association in 1934 and made several appeals for unity when the association became embroiled in several splits. In 1941–42 she took over as chair as well as President of the Association, and briefly succeeded in reintegrating the dissident Cork and Dublin boards into the association before another secession in 1943.

In 1931, a set of medals she presented helped spark a camogie revival in Cavan which led to 25 teams being affiliated. Further medals for an inter-county match between Cavan and Meath helped start the game in her native county.

== Work on behalf of female graduates ==
She was also president of the Irish Federation of University Women (1937–39) and of the National University Women Graduates' Association (1943–47). In 1937 she was actively involved in the Women Graduates' campaign against the new constitution, seeking deletion of articles which they believed discriminated against women. O'Farrelly also became a founder and President of the Dublin Soroptimist Club in December 1938.

== Irish Colleges and other work ==
She was a founder member, and subsequently principal for many years, of the Ulster College of Irish, Cloghaneely, County Donegal, she was also associated with the Leinster and Connacht colleges and served as chairperson of the Federation of Irish Language Summer Schools. An anecdote told by Brian O'Nolan deprecating her spoken Irish may have been born out of professional rivalry. She also became president of the Irish Industrial Development Association and the Homespun Society, and administrator of the John Connor Magee Trust for the development of Gaeltacht industry. She represented the Ulster Gaelic Union at Celtic Congresses in the 1920s and 1930s.

== Celtic Congress ==
In 1917, Edward Thomas John, a Welsh nationalist and Member of Parliament for Anglesey, attempted to revive the former Celtic Association under the new name of "The Celtic Congress", thus initiating the second wave of inter-Celtic relations. For O'Farrelly and indeed her closest friend Douglas Hyde, who also took an active interest, the Celtic Congress held much in common with the Gaelic League with which they had for so long been involved: its raison-d’être was to nurture and promote scholarship and culture (albeit 'Celtic' rather than Irish); the congress was in theory to be held annually (similar to the Oireachtas); and its leading members were now drawn from educationalist and linguistic circles rather than the more exclusive Dublin Castle circle with which it had been associated at the turn of the twentieth century. Mary Hayden, Osborn Bergin, Eoin Mac Néill and Robin Flower were among those also involved in the Irish wing of the Celtic Congress. When E.T. John died in early 1931, O'Farrelly took on a heavier administrative role within the Celtic Congress, and in the Breton Francois Jaffrennou-Taldir's words, "the Association was given a new life in 1935 [sic], thanks to Miss Agnes O'Farrelly".

== Retirement and death ==
An oil portrait by Seán Keating was presented to her by the Women Graduates' Association on her retirement from UCD in 1947, after which she lived at 38 Brighton Road, Rathgar, where she died on 5 November 1951. The Taoiseach and President attended her funeral to Deans Grange Cemetery. She never married, and left an estate valued at £3,109.

== Writing ==
O'Farrelly wrote in both Irish and English, often under the pseudonym 'Uan Uladh' (lit. 'Lamb of Ulster', punning on her name, Agnes, which is sometimes incorrectly thought to mean 'lamb' due to confusion with Latin agnus — the name is actually from Greek Ἁγνή Hagnḗ, 'pure, holy'). Prose works include The Reign of Humbug (1900), Leabhar an Athar Eoghan ('Father Eoghan's Book', 1903), Filidheacht Sheagháin Uí Neachtain ('Poetry of Seán Ó Neachtain', 1911), and her novels Grádh agus Crádh ('Love and Suffering', 1901), An Cneamhaire ('The Knave', 1902) and the travelogue Smaointe ar Árainn ('Thoughts on Aran', 1902). Poetry includes Out of the depths (1921) and Áille an Domhain ('Beauty of the World', 1927).

O'Farrelly recorded her experiences on Inis Meáin which would later form the basis of her travelogue Smaointe Ar Árainn. The importance of this travelogue lies less in its linguistic features than in the access it provides to the life of women and children on the island, access that the more celebrated account of Synge does not provide. It is also a document which offers significant insight into the aims and aspirations of O'Farrelly herself and of her beloved Gaelic League: it serves as a platform from which O'Farrelly's belief in equality for women is projected; it depicts the modus operandi used by the Gaelic League to promote its ideology on Inis Meáin; and it reveals the manner in which the League's so-called 'Irish-Ireland' principles were assimilated by the islanders.

Out of the Depths (1921) is a collection of political poetry, composed in reaction to the Irish War of Independence, and it displays how O'Farrelly comes to terms with an Ireland far from her ideal. It portrays the dystopian nature of English power, as O'Farrelly sees it, juxtaposed with the light, spirituality, purity, truth, hope and unity of Ireland, which could enable its future salvation. The overall propagandist purpose of the collection is to offer hope to the demoralised Irish people. Áille an Domhain (1927), produced in a climate of relative stability, reveals a romantic utopianism, and celebrates a return to a harmonious rhythm of life, uninterrupted by the unnatural nature of war.

== Legacy ==
A documentary film on her life, entitled Uan Uladh and presented by Clíodhna Ní Chorráin, aired on TG4 in 2024.
