= University of Galway Students' Union =

Representative student body in Galway

- Institution: University of Galway
- Location: Áras na Mac Léinn, University of Galway, Galway, Ireland
- Established: 1911 - In its current form since 1964
- President: Seán de Búrca
- Affiliations: Aontas na Mac Léinn in Éirinn
- Website: su.universityofgalway.ie

The University of Galway Students' Union (Irish: Comhaltas na Mac Léinn, Ollscoil na Gaillimhe) is the representative body of students at the University of Galway in Ireland. Among its former leaders is Michael D. Higgins, the ninth President of Ireland.

== Functions and objectives ==
The University of Galway Students' Union is a representative student body. Every student who registers at the University of Galway automatically becomes a member of the Students' Union on payment of a student levy. The union is separated into two entities - the Students' Union Representative side and the Students' Union Commercial Services Ltd.

As outlined in the Students' Union (SU) constitution, the function of the union is to "represent its members and promote, defend and vindicate the rights of its members at all levels of society". The Students' Union sits on several university committees, including the University Governing Authority. The union's objectives include providing social, recreational and commercial services for members through the college bar – SULT, entertainment events, the SU shop and other commercial services. The union also part funds the campus newspaper, Sin and campus radio station, Flirt FM.

On a national level, the Union pursues "fair and equal access to education for all sectors of the Irish people", and liaises with the Union of Students in Ireland in this goal. Work of the union has included the organising of a grant information evening to help students apply for local authority grants.

== Executive committee ==
While the president, along with the staff, is mainly responsible for the day-to-day running of the union, the Students' Union Executive is the committee that runs the union on an ongoing basis. It consists of fifteen elected members, whose responsibilities cover different student concerns - from educational issues to accommodation and discrimination. Of the fifteen members of the executive, four are paid sabbatical (full-time) officers, i.e. the president and three vice-presidents, while the other twelve officers work on a part-time, unpaid basis.

Students elect their Students' Union officers. The term of office is from 1 July to 30 June of the following year. To be eligible to run for election, candidates must be a full member of the Students' Union, i.e. a registered student or current executive officer, and receive 20 nominations. Candidates require three nominators who must be full members of the union and club captains (where the position sought is clubs' captain) or society auditors (where the position is societies' chairperson).

== History ==
The first form of student representation in what is now University of Galway was the foundation of a Student Representation Council (SRC) in December of 1911, with Bryan Cusack elected as their first President. In 1913, the auditor of the College's Literary and Debating Society, Conor O'Malley, noted that the SRC had 'never gone beyond the stage of paper'. O'Malley would go on to call upon the alumni and students to establish a 'Union', which at this stage referred to a student building, rather than an organisation, with this style of Student Union building being pioneered by Queen's on the island of Ireland. The council was firmly established by the mid-1920s, and in the 1960s was formally developed into the university's Students' Union, then known as Comhairle Teachta na Mac Léinn.

Restructured in 1964 into the Students' Union (although retaining the Irish Comhairle Teacha na Mac Léinn until later years), the function of the union as per the constitution is "to represent its members and promote, defend and vindicate the rights of its members at all levels of society". Key events from the union's past include:

- 1964 • Led by Michael D. Higgins, 600 students marched to protest about "poor relations generally between the University and the local community" as many hotels refused to take visiting students and landladies discriminated against students in summer.
- 2008 • Fees campaign begins with thousands marching to Eyre Square
- 2009 • The Students' Union organised and attended several fees-related protests and ran a campaign encouraging students to "Adopt a TD"
- 2014 • The union joined the international Boycott, Divestment and Sanctions policy against the State of Israel after a referendum of members tabled by the NUI Galway Palestine Solidarity Society. Members also voted to retain the union's pro-choice position on abortion after an attempt to repeal the previous year's vote was tabled to students by the NUI Galway Life Society.
- 2022 • The Students' Union established the role of a full time Irish Language Officer by referendum.

== Presidents ==
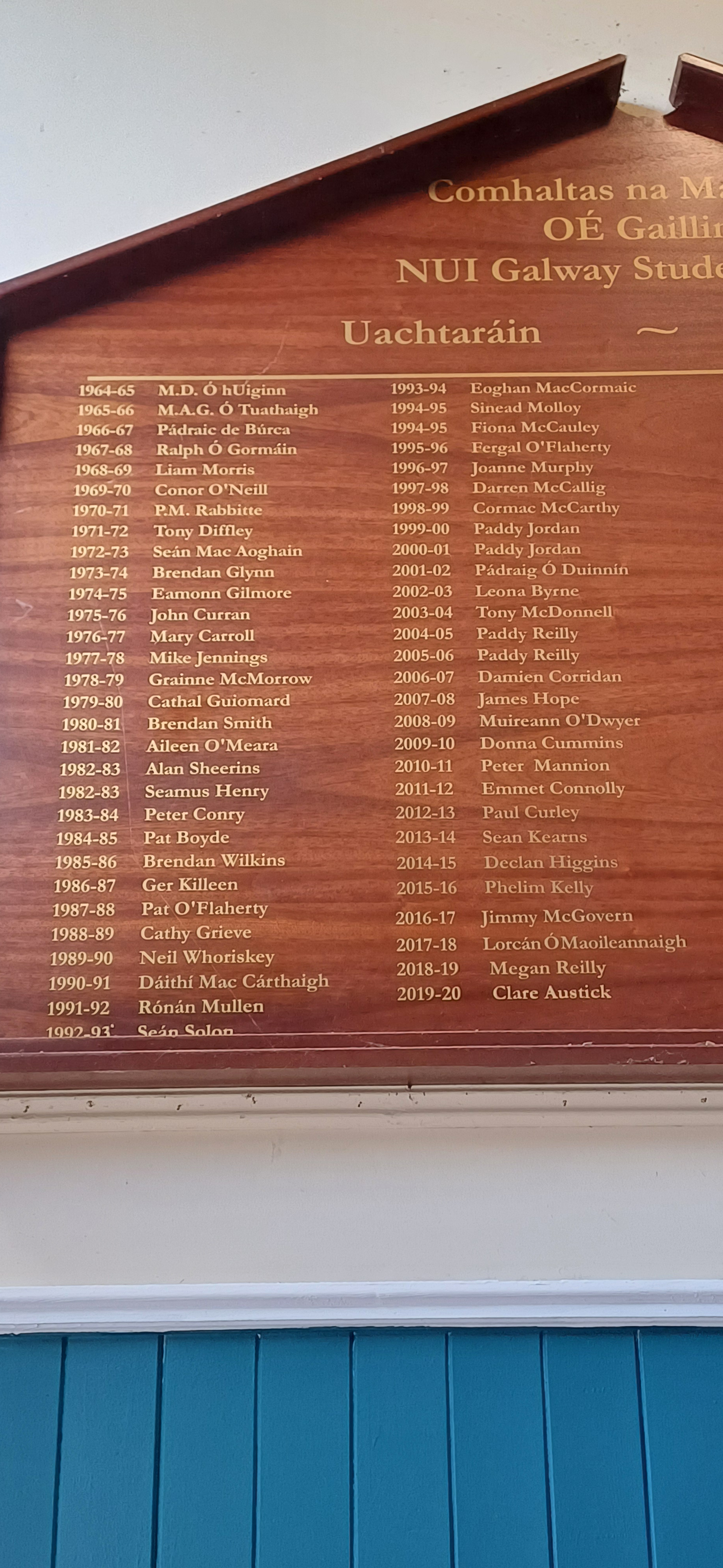
Plaque listing former presidents of the students' union, as displayed in Sult, the SU bar

| President | Year |
|---|---|
| M.D. Ó hUiginn (Michael D. Higgins) | 1964-65 |
| M.A.G Ó Tuathaigh (Gearóid Ó Tuathaigh) | 1965-66 |
| Pádraic de Búrca | 1966-67 |
| Ralph Ó Gormáin | 1967-68 |
| Liam Morris | 1968-69 |
| Conor O'Neill | 1969-70 |
| P.M. Rabbitte | 1970-71 |
| Tony Diffley | 1971-72 |
| Seán Mac Aoghain | 1972-73 |
| Brendan Glynn | 1973-74 |
| Eamon Gilmore | 1974-75 |
| John Curran | 1975-76 |
| Mary Carroll | 1976-77 |
| Mike Jennings | 1977-78 |
| Grainne McMorrow | 1978-79 |
| Cathal Guiomard | 1979-80 |
| Brendan 'Speedie' Smith | 1980-81 |
| Aileen O'Meara | 1981-82 |
| Alan Sheerins | 1982-83 |
| Seamus Henry | 1982-83 |
| Peter Conry | 1983-84 |
| Pat Boyde | 1984-85 |
| Brendan Wilkins | 1985-86 |
| Ger Killeen | 1986-87 |
| Pat O'Flaherty | 1987-88 |
| Cathy Grieve | 1988-89 |
| Neil Whoriskey | 1989-90 |
| Dáithí Mac Cárthaigh | 1990-91 |
| Rónán Mullen | 1991-92 |
| Seán Solon | 1992-93 |
| Eoghan MacCormaic | 1993-94 |
| Sinead Molloy | 1994-95 |
| Fiona McCauley | 1994-95 |
| Fergal O'Flaherty | 1995-96 |
| Joanne Murphy | 1996-97 |
| Darren McCallig | 1997-98 |
| Cormac McCarthy | 1998-99 |
| Paddy Jordan | 1999-2001 |
| Pádraig Ó Duinnín | 2001-02 |
| Leona Byrne | 2002-03 |
| Tony McDonnell | 2003-04 |
| Paddy Reilly | 2004-06 |
| Damien Corridan | 2006-07 |
| James Hope | 2007-08 |
| Muireann O'Dwyer | 2008-09 |
| Donna Cummins | 2009-10 |
| Peter Mannion | 2010-11 |
| Emmet Connolly | 2011-12 |
| Paul Curley | 2012-13 |
| Sean Kearns | 2013-14 |
| Declan Higgins | 2014-15 |
| Phelim Kelly | 2015-16 |
| Jimmy McGovern | 2016-17 |
| Lorcán Ó Maoileannaigh | 2017-18 |
| Megan Reilly | 2018-19 |
| Clare Austick | 2019-20 |
| Pádraic Toomey | 2020-21 |
| Róisín Nic Lochlainn | 2021-22 |
| Sai Gujulla | 2022-23 |
| Dean Kenny | 2023-24 |
| Faye Ní Dhomhnaill | 2024-25 |
| Maisie Hall | 2025-26 |
| Seán de Búrca | 2026-27 |
