= Loreto College, St Stephen's Green =

Private all-girls school in Dublin, Ireland

Location
- 53 St Stephen's Green, Dublin, D02 XE79; Ireland
- Coordinates: 53.33688°N 6.25662°W

Information
- Type: Voluntary
- Motto: Cruci Dum Spiro Fido (While I live I trust in the Cross)
- Religious affiliations: Roman Catholic; Sisters of Loreto
- Established: 1833; 193 years ago
- Colours: red and white
- Website: www.loretothegreen.ie

Loreto College, St Stephen's Green (sometimes referred to as Loreto on the Green) is a Catholic all-girls private school situated on St Stephen's Green in Dublin, Ireland. The school was founded at 58 Harcourt Street in 1833 as a convent and school by Mother Teresa Ball just after Catholic emancipation. In 1841, the school moved to 53 St Stephen's Green and still occupies the same building as of 2023.

== Notable alumni ==
The school has had numerous notable alumni in the arts, sport, politics and religion.

=== The arts ===
- Beatrice Behan - artist and author
- Maureen Charlton - poet, playwright and broadcaster
- Gemma-Leah Devereux - actor
- Kathleen Dolan - RTÉ's first female announcer
- Sonya Lennon - stylist and TV presenter
- Ailbhe McDonagh - cellist and composer

=== Politics ===
- Helena Concannon - historian and politician
- Eibhlín Nic Niocaill - Gaelic League activist
- Jennifer Carroll MacNeill - Irish Minister of Health
