= Mary E.L. Butler =

Irish writer, novelist and essayist (1874–1920)

Mary E. L. Butler (1874-1920) (Irish: Máire de Buitléir) was an Irish writer and Irish-language activist.

Marriage Certificate - 1907

Mary Ellen Butler was the daughter of Peter Lambert Butler and the granddaughter of William Butler of Bunnahow, County Clare. She was a first cousin (once removed) of Edward Carson In order to learn Irish she made several visits to the Aran Islands. According to her memoirs, which are in a Benedictine monastery in France, she was converted to the nationalist cause after reading John Mitchel's Jail Journal.

From 1899 to 1904 she edited a women's page as well as a children's page in the Irish Weekly Independent. She promoted the nationalist cause in both. She joined the Gaelic League, where she met Irish-language enthusiasts such as Evelyn Donovan, Agnes O'Farrelly and Máire Ní Chinnéide, and spent several years on its executive.

In 1907, she married Thomas O'Nolan, who died in 1913.

She was a close friend of Arthur Griffith and in a letter of condolence which Griffith wrote to her sister from Mountjoy Jail in 1920 he states that Mary Butler was the first person to suggest to him the name Sinn Féin as the title of the new organisation which he had founded.

She died in Rome in 1920 and is buried there.

== Early life and education ==
The Butlers of County Clare were a landowning family that had remained Catholic, unlike other branches of the same family. Her father, Peter, had been educated in France and was always at home in French as in English or Irish.

The family of her mother, Ellen Lambert of Castle Ellen, County Galway, remained staunchly Gaelic. Her younger sister, Isabella, however, was, interestingly, the mother of Lord (better known as Sir) Edward Carson. Thus, Edward Carson, who became the symbol of Ulster Unionism, was a cousin of Mary Butler. Her early education was first conducted at home and the way was carefully prepared for the masters' tuition.

During the Land League agitation of the late 1870s and early 1880s, Butler was educated at Alexandra College, Dublin, a school attended largely by young women of Protestant background, where she had the advantage of having native masters for the French, Italian, and German languages which she studied with enthusiasm.

According to A Life of Mary Butler, a marked characteristic of her young days, and one that grew with her growth, was her intense love of home ties. Butler's conversion to nationalism resulted from a chance encounter with the writings of Young Ireland, and like many blossoming cultural nationalists, she immersed herself in the culture of the western part of the country, visiting the Aran Islands on several occasions.

== Activism ==
Butler was a member of the Gaelic League, serving for several years on its League Executive, but unlike other notable female members such as Countess Markevich and Maud Gonne, Mary did not seek an "assertive public role".

Butler was not a professed feminist. She believed that in order for women to progress in Ireland they must progress within the limits of conservative Ireland. She approached much of her writings from a gender related viewpoint, making much reference to the domestic side of activism.

She wrote articles that appeared frequently in the League's newspaper, An Claidheamh Soluis, as well as in the United Irishman and in other periodicals. Some were republished as pamphlets.

Butler's overriding goal was always the achievement of securing an Irish speaking Ireland. It is no surprise then that Mary had ties to Arthur Griffith. Griffith actually credited Mary with coining the term ‘Sinn Féin’. She focused mainly in her writings on nationalism but in a domestic context and underlined in much of her texts the important role of women in maintaining and promoting nationalism in the home.

== Writing ==
Butler was a frequent contributor to the leading periodicals of "Irish Ireland". Her articles appeared frequently in the League's newspaper, An Claidheamh Soluis, as well as in the United Irishman and in various Irish-American periodicals. She also wrote columns in the Irish Weekly Independent on issues concerning children's education and women's role in the movement. Many of her articles got issued separately as pamphlets among some of which were: "Irish woman and the Home language", "Two schools: A contrast", "Womanhood and Nationhood".

Butler also wrote fiction, publishing a collection of stories “A Bundle of Rushes” in 1900. In 1906 her first novel “The Ring of Day” was serialized in the Irish Peasant, before being published in a book form a year later. The book focused on a young woman's conversion to the cause of Irish-Ireland and may be largely taken as a self-portrait.

== Religion ==
Butler was a devout Catholic, as shown by the fact that she was a frequent contributor to the Bulletin and other Catholic periodicals. Despite her views on gender equality, Butler did believe that the Church promoted the domesticated idea of women, although she believed women could still do a lot of work for the Irish language revival movement from the comfort of their own homes.

She lived in Brittany, France for a while with her mother, before moving to Rome. Butler was very comfortable living in Brittany, as she viewed the native Bretons as having the same Celtic roots and sharing the same Catholic beliefs and strong level of faith as the Irish.

In her writings for the Catholic Bulletin, she also continuously compares the landscape to the west coast of Ireland, constantly remarking at how similar they are. She viewed France and Italy as two very free countries and allies of Ireland and she seemed to believe that Ireland should aspire to be more like them, in terms of politics.

She believed that the general populations of the two countries were very interested in the Irish political affairs of the time. Furthermore, she loved her time in Rome too, as the city had such a long and strong history of being connected with Catholicism and the ground was, as she said, "soaked with the blood of martyrs". She was buried in the Catholic cemetery San Lorenzo in Rome on 29 November 1920.

== Bibliography ==
- Ní Chinnéide, Mairéad (1993). Máire de Buitléir: Bean Athbheochana. LeabhairComhar.
