= Eibhlín Nic Niocaill =

Irish-language activist

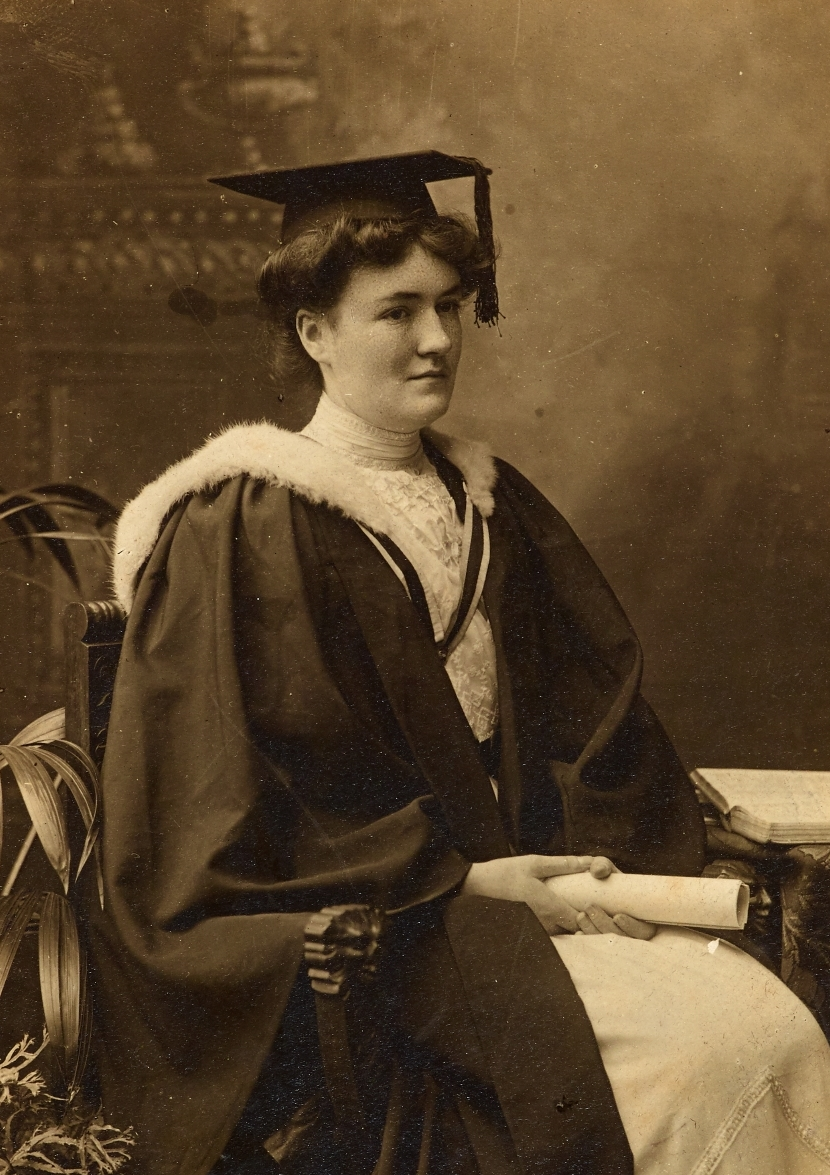
- Nic Niocaill at her graduation in 1906
- Born: Eveleen Constance Nicolls; 22 October 1884; Dublin, Ireland
- Died: 13 August 1909 (aged 24); Blasket Islands

Eibhlín Nic Niocaill (English: Eveleen Constance Nicolls; 22 October 1884 – 13 August 1909) was an Irish Gaelic League activist.

== Early life and education ==
Eibhlín Nic Niocaill was born Eveleen Constance Nicolls in Dublin on 22 October 1884. She was the only daughter of Archibald J. Nicolls (1845–1924) and Mary (1853–1938). Her father was a barrister and secretary of the Loan Fund Board of Ireland. She had four brothers, Arthur, Jasper, George and Edward.

Despite her father having a government job, the family held nationalistic beliefs and were Irish speakers. Her brother, George, later joined Sinn Féin. By the 1901 census, Nic Niocaill was using the Irish spelling of her name and George was Seoirse.

She attended Loreto Convent, Rathmines and then Loreto Convent, St Stephen's Green where she excelled, particularly in languages. At her senior examination she attained first prizes in Irish, French, and German, going on to take Royal University of Ireland courses at Loreto College.

She was consistently top of her class in college, winning a number of exhibitions. When she attained her BA in 1906, she was first in all of Ireland and won the Steward scholarship. To complete her MA, she was awarded a £300 travelling scholarship, travelling to Germany and Paris studying Old Irish under Marie Henri d'Arbois de Jubainville. While in Paris she lectured at the University of Paris and reorganised the Parisian branch of the Gaelic League.

== Career and death ==
Upon her return to Ireland she was a prominent member of the Gaelic League. She joined the Five Provinces branch, lectured, and organised the 1909 Feis. In her writings for the League's paper, An Claidheamh Soluis, she linked the revival of Irish to the independence movement as well as bringing in the rights of women. Nic Niocaill was an early feminist, writing for the magazine Bean na hÉireann. She was part of a large circle of friends including Patrick Pearse and Mary E.L. Butler.

She travelled to tour the Gaeltacht of south Kerry with Butler in summer 1909. In previous summers she had travelled to the Aran Islands, developing a close knowledge of the Gaelic vernacular. Butler returned home after a week in Dingle, Nic Niocaill went on to Ventry to stay with Thady Kevane. Here she became friends with James Cousins, who described here as "tall, stately: an embodiment of sweetness and gentleness, sweetness that has no mawkishness in it, and a gentleness resting on fixity and fearlessness." Like many of the descriptions of her, it appears idealised, referring to her modesty, good looks, and calmness. On 13 July 1909, she arrived on the Great Blasket Island, staying in the house of Pádraig Ó Catháin who was called "the King". Enchanted by the island, she decided a long stay. While there she began teaching the girls of the islands to swim. On Friday 13 August she was teaching the daughter of Tomas O'Crohan, Cáit, to swim. Despite them only being a few feet from the shore, she and Cáit got into trouble. Cáit's brother, Donal, attempted to save both of them. Another local Peats Tom Ó Cearnaigh came to their aid, but could only save Cáit. Nic Niocaill and Donal drowned.

Her death inspired a huge outpouring of grief both locally and nationally. She had just been elected to the Gaelic League's executive committee, the youngest person to be elected to this position. There was a funeral service in Dunquin, after which her body was transported by train from Dingle to Dublin, where it was met by thousands. They accompanied her body to Glasnevin Cemetery for burial. Joseph Holloway, the diarist, write that there was never a more solemn funeral. Pearse called Nic Niocaill the "most nobly planned" of all the women he knew in an article in the Freeman's Journal on 16 August. Biographers later tried to insinuate a romance between her and Pearse, but there is no evidence of this.

The Gaelic League invoked Nic Niocaill as a hero for saving Cáit, selling portraits of her at meetings, with the funds raised going to the O'Crohan family. 300 pictures were sold by July 1910, and raised over £21. At a meeting on 9 September 1909, £49 was raised for a scholarship, in her memory, to send a girl to the Gaeltacht, and for a statue or plaque dedicated to Nic Niocaill. In the next 6 months, £100 was raised but the plans never came to fruition. Eulogies were written to her by Katharine Tynan, Padraic Colum and James Cousins.

The book A Dark Day on the Blaskets by Mícheál Ó Dubhshláine was inspired by the events around Nic Niocaill's death. The play Snámh na Saoirse by Róisín Sheehy recounts the events of her drowning.
