= Gearty =

Gearty is a surname. Notable people with the surname include:

- Conor Gearty (1957–2025), Irish legal scholar
- Edward J. Gearty (1923–2009), American politician
- Eugene Gearty, American sound engineer
- Mary Rose Gearty, Irish judge and lawyer
