= Conradh na Gaeilge =

Organisation promoting the Irish language and related rights

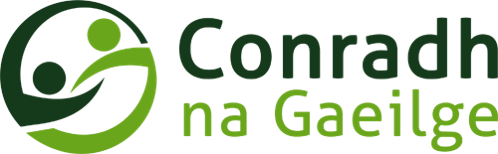
- Logo of Conradh na Gaeilge
- Abbreviation: CnaG
- Formation: 31 July 1893; 133 years ago
- Founder: Douglas Hyde
- Type: Non-governmental organisation
- Headquarters: 6 Harcourt Street; Dublin 2 Ireland (Temporarily located at 66 Camden Street, Dublin 2)
- Fields: Irish language promotion Gaelic revival
- Secretary General: Julian de Spáinn
- President: Ciarán Mac Giolla Bhéin
- Subsidiaries: Raidió Rí-Rá
- Website: cnag.ie
- Formerly called: The Gaelic League

Conradh na Gaeilge (/ˌkʌnrə nə ˈɡeɪlɡə/ KUN-rə nə GALE-gə; Irish: [ˈkɔn̪ˠɾˠə n̪ˠə ˈɡeːlʲɟə]), historically known in English as the Gaelic League, is a social and cultural organisation which promotes the Irish language in Ireland and worldwide. The organisation was founded in 1893 with Douglas Hyde as its first president, when it emerged as the successor of several 19th century groups such as the Gaelic Union. The organisation was a spearhead of the Gaelic revival and of Gaeilgeoir activism.

While Hyde succeeded in drawing unionists to the League, the organisation increasingly gave expression to the nationalist impulse behind the language revival. From 1915, members of its executive acknowledged the leadership of the Irish Republican Brotherhood in the struggle for Irish statehood. After the creation of the Irish Free State, and limited advances with respect to the teaching and official use of the language, many members transferred their commitment to the new institutions, political parties and education system. In 2008, Conradh na Gaeilge adopted a new constitution, dropping the post-1915 references to "Irish freedom", while reaffirming the ambition to restore Irish as the language of everyday life throughout Ireland. In Northern Ireland, it campaigned for an Irish Language Act. In the absence of an agreed Stormont executive, in 2022 the Westminster Parliament incorporated many of its proposed provisions in the Identity and Language (Northern Ireland) Act.

Conradh today promotes the language and the rights of Irish speakers, runs language classes, operates a bookshop and supports programmes in Irish for schools and other sectors. It has more than 150 branches (at peak it had over 600) across Ireland, with three in the UK, and has two governing committees and a small staff.

== History ==
=== Foundation: "De-Anglicising Ireland" ===
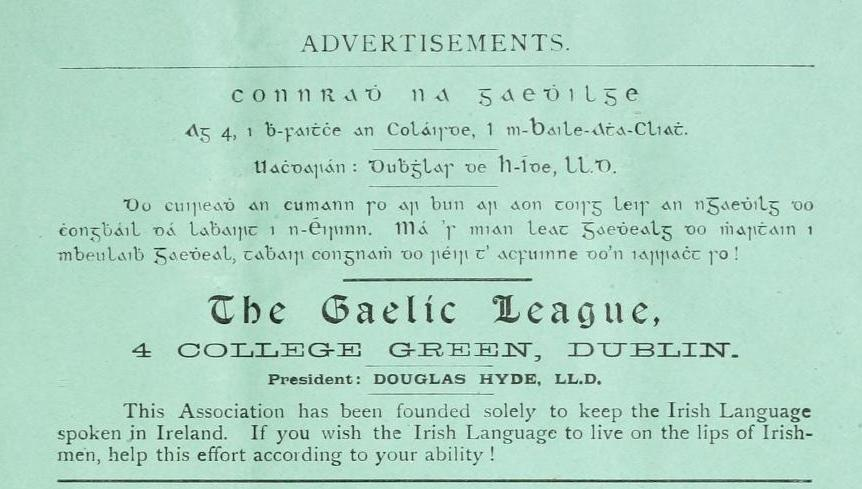
Advertisement for the Gaelic League in the Gaelic Journal, June 1894. The English text reads "This Association has been founded solely to keep the Irish Language spoken in Ireland. If you wish the Irish Language to live on the lips of Irishmen, help this effort according to your ability!"

Conradh na Gaeilge, the Gaelic League, a successor to Ulick Bourke's earlier Gaelic Union, was formed in 1893, at a time when Irish as a spoken language appeared to be on the verge of extinction. Analysis of the 1881 Census showed that at least 45% of those born in Ireland in the first decade of the 19th century had been brought up as Irish speakers. Figures from the 1891 census suggested that just 3.5% were being raised speaking the language. Ireland had become an overwhelmingly English-speaking country. Spoken mainly by peasants and farm labourers in the poorer districts of the west of Ireland, Irish was widely seen, in the words of Matthew Arnold, as "the badge of a beaten race."

The first aim of the League was to maintain the language in the Gaeltacht, the largely western districts in which spoken Irish survived. The late 20th-century Gaeilgeoir activist Aodán Mac Póilin notes, however, that "the main ideological impact of the language movement was not in the Gaeltacht, but among English-speaking nationalists". The League developed "both a conservationist and a revivalist role".

The League's first president, Douglas Hyde (Dúbhghlás de hÍde), the son of a Church of Ireland rector from County Roscommon, helped create an ethos in the early days that attracted a number of unionists into its ranks. Remarkably, these included the Rev. Richard Kane, Grand Master of the Belfast Orange Lodge and organiser of the Anti-Home Rule Convention of 1892. But from the beginning there was an unresolved conflict between non-political rhetoric and the nationalism implicit in the League's revivalist project.

With the aid of Eugene O'Growney (author of Simple Lessons in Irish) Eoin MacNeill, Thomas O'Neill Russell and others, the League was launched in the wake of an address Hyde delivered to the Irish National Literary Society, on 25 November 1892: ‘"The Necessity for De-Anglicising Ireland’". Citing Giuseppe Mazzini (the Italian nationalist who had been the inspiration for the rare language enthusiast among the Young Irelanders, Thomas Davis), Hyde argued that "in Anglicising ourselves wholesale we have thrown away with a light heart the best claim we have to nationality".

Implicitly, this was a criticism of the national movement as it had developed since Catholic emancipation. Although a gaeilgeoir, Daniel O'Connell had declared himself "sufficiently utilitarian not to regret [the] gradual abandonment" of the language. For the Emancipator's keenest supporters, the "positive and unmistakable" mark of distinction between Irish and English was "the distinction created by religion". Hyde's project spoke to a new exclusionary sense of what it is to be Irish. The simple practice of referring to Gaelic as "the Irish language", consciously or not, rendered "those who did not speak it as less Irish, and those who did not even acknowledge its status as non-Irish".

The League rapidly developed into the leading institution promoting the Gaelic Revival, organising Irish classes and student immersions in the Gaeltacht, and publishing in Irish. The League's first newspaper was An Claidheamh Soluis (The Sword of Light), the most noted editor of which was Pádraig Pearse. The motto of the League was Sinn Féin, Sinn Féin amháin (Ourselves, Ourselves alone).

=== Early campaigns ===
With national feeling heightened in part by the Boer War, League membership increased from 1900. The number of branches rose from 43 in 1897 to 600 in 1904 with a membership of 50,000.

Among the League's campaign successes during these early years was the establishment in 1903 of the first Irish-language summer training college, Coláiste na Mumhan, in Ballingeary, County Cork; and, supported by the college, the introduction in 1904 of a bilingual programme of instruction for National schools in Irish-speaking districts. This marked a shift from the English-only instruction upon which Catholic Church (appearing to accept O'Connell's utilitarian view of the matter) had insisted upon in its school administration. Under the supervision of teaching brothers and nuns, children had been punished for speaking in their mother tongue.

=== The national cause ===
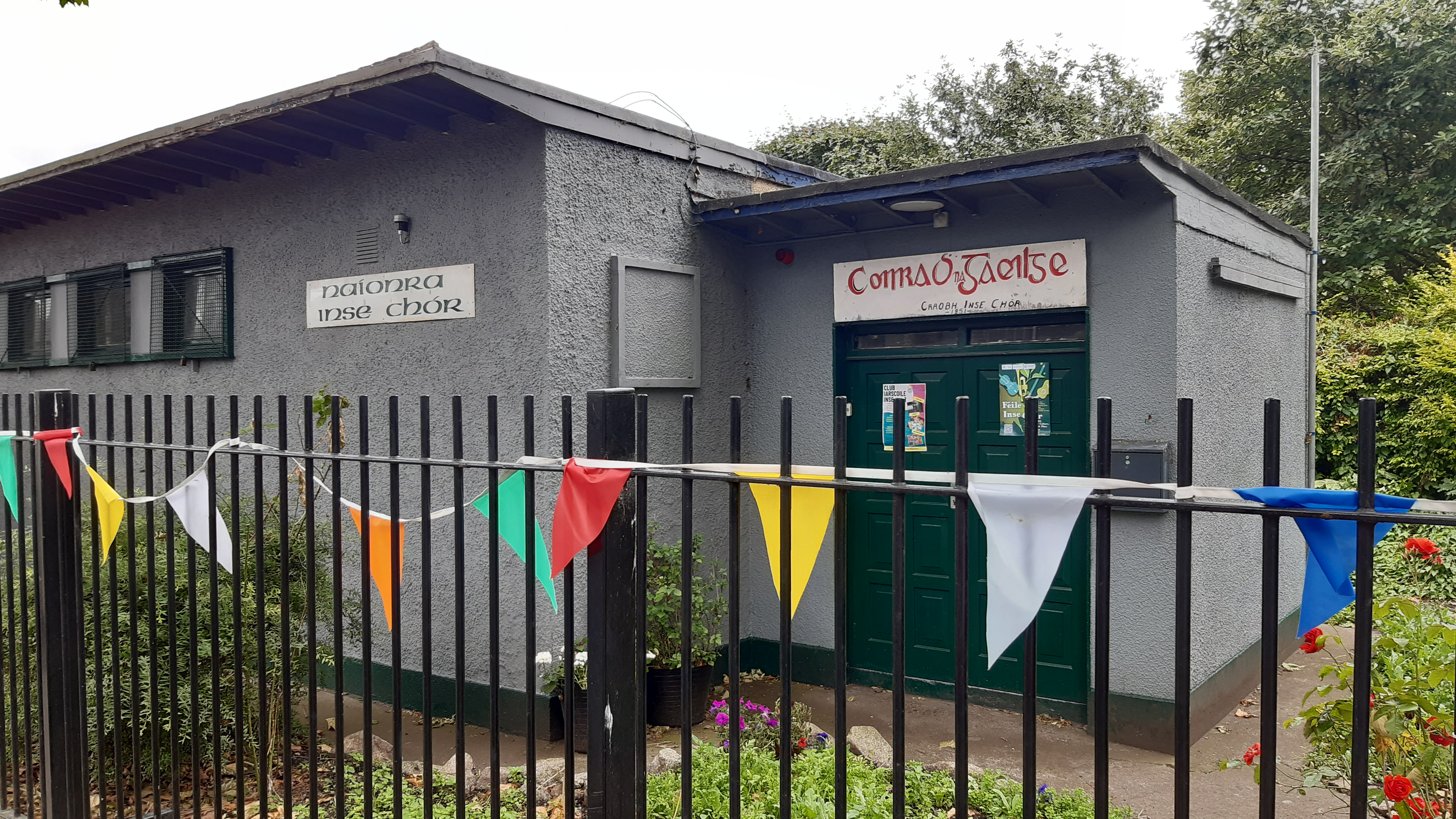
Conradh na Gaeilge clubhouse on the grounds of Grattan Crescent Park, Inchicore, Dublin

Hyde declared that "The Irish language, thank God, is neither Protestant nor Catholic, it is neither a Unionist nor a Separatist." Although the League took this non-political principle seriously enough to decline participation in the unveiling of a 1798 centenary monument to Wolfe Tone, much like the Gaelic Athletic Association the organisation served as an occasion and cover for nationalist recruitment. Seán T. O'Kelly recalls that, as early 1903, as a travelling manager for An Claidheamh Soluis, he was in a position to recruit young men for Irish Republican Brotherhood (IRB) in every one of 32 counties. It was through the League that many future leaders of the independence struggle first met, laying the foundation for groups such as the Irish Volunteers (1913).

"While being non-political", Michael Collins saw the League, by "its very nature", as "intensely national". Under a system of foreign rule that made the people "forget to look to themselves, and to turn their backs upon their own country", it did "more than any other movement to restore national pride, honour and self-respect". Arthur Griffith had been similarly dismissive of the League's political neutrality of the League. Popular support for the revival of the language, he argued, sprang precisely from its role as a mark of Irish nationality.

As the nationalist impulse behind the League became more obvious, and in particular as the League began to work more closely with the Catholic Church to secure support for teaching Irish in the schools, Unionists withdrew. Hyde's effort to promote "the native language and culture as a supra-factional and supra-sectarian field where Irish Protestants and Catholics could meet as equals" was lost. In the north, Protestants were themselves moving toward a distinct Ulster unionism that rejected claims of an overarching Irish cultural identity.

Increasingly Republicans were blunt about what they saw as the League's place within the nationalist movement. The paper, Irish Freedom, declared:

The work of the Gaelic League is to prevent the assimilation of the Irish nation by the English nation [...] The work is as essentially anti-English as the work attempted by Fenianism or the Society of United Irishmen [...] The Irish language is a political weapon of the first importance against English encroachment.

The issue of the League's political independence was decided at its Annual General Meeting held in Dundalk in 1915. Rumours circulated that John Redmond's Irish Parliamentary Party were seeking to take over the League as they had earlier attempted to take over the Irish Volunteers. Diarmuid Lynch of the IRB mobilised Brotherhood members positioned throughout the League to secure the nominations and votes required to appoint a new Coiste (executive) that "was safe from the IRB viewpoint".

=== Northern Protestant involvement ===
The first Ulster branch of the Gaelic League was formed in east Belfast in 1895, a year after the death of Robert Shipboy MacAdam who, with Dr. James MacDonnell, had presided over a precursor of the League earlier in the century: Cuideacht Gaoidhilge Uladh / The Ulster Gaelic Society (1828–1843). Following in this tradition of "Protestant Gaelicism", which had also drawn on the Irish language practice of Protestant church "home missions", the new Belfast branch was formed under the active patronage (until he left to become Church of Ireland Lord Bishop of Ossory) of the Rev. John Baptiste Crozier and the presidency of his parishioner, Dr. John St Clair Boyd, both unionists, and of the Orange Order Grand Master, the Rev. Richard Rutledge Kane. Claiming to afford a "common platform to Catholic and Protestant", by 1899 the League had nine branches in the city including one in the unionist Shankill ward where, in the 1911 census, 106 people recorded themselves as Irish speakers.

For other Protestant pioneers of the Irish language in the north, Oliver MacDonagh suggests that, in allowing them to identify with Ireland's pre-Tridentine past, the League offered a non-sectarian door into the otherwise overwhelmingly Catholic nationalist community. This appears to have been the case for Alice Milligan, publisher in Belfast of The Shan Van Vocht. Milligan's command of Irish was never fluent, and on that basis Patrick Pearse was to object when, in 1904, the Gaelic League hired her as a travelling lecturer. She proved herself by establishing new branches throughout Ireland and raising funds along the way. In the north, in Ulster, she focused on the more difficult task of recruiting Protestants, working with, among other activists, Hyde, Ada McNeill, Roger Casement, Alice Stopford Green, Stephen Gwynn, and Seamus McManus.

James Owen Hannay (better known as the novelist George A. Birmingham), originally of Belfast, was co-opted onto the League's national executive body in December 1904 while a Church of Ireland (Anglican) rector in Westport in County Mayo. Hyde and Arthur Griffith sympathised with Hannay's desire for a "union of the two Irish democracies", Catholic in the south and Protestant in the north. In the north Hannay saw a potential ally in Lindsay Crawford and his Independent Orange Order. Like the Conradh na Gaeilge, he saw the IOO as "profoundly democratic in spirit" and independent of "the rich and the patronage of the great".

Crawford, who stood for election to the League's executive committee, was critical of what he regarded as the League's impractical romanticism. In his paper, Irish Protestant, he suggested that the Irish Ireland movement needed an injection of "Ulsteria", an "industrial awakening on true economic lines: it is wrong when people crave bread to offer them 'language and culture'".

Offence taken at his successful play General John Regan, and his defence of Crawford's opposition to church control of education, strained Hannay's relations with nationalists and he withdrew from League. Meanwhile, in North America, Crawford (who had found no political home in Ireland) went on to campaign with Eamon de Valera for recognition and support for the republic proclaimed in 1916.

Ernest Blythe, who joined the Irish Republican Brotherhood in 1909 with the distinction of maintaining for three years his membership of the Orange Order, had as his first Conradh na Gaeilge teacher Sinéad Flanagan, de Valera's future wife. To improve his knowledge of the Irish language, he lived in the County Kerry Gaeltacht earning his keep as an agricultural labourer. A similar path was followed by IRB organiser of the Irish Volunteers, Bulmer Hobson.

=== Participation of women ===
Alice Milligan was exceptional among the League's leading activists as a northern Protestant, but less so as a woman. All the priorities of the larger Irish-Ireland movement which developed around the revival of the language, including teaching children a national history and literature, and the use and consumption of Irish-made products, were associated with the sphere of home and community in which women were accorded initiative. In comparison to the political parties (whether republican or constitutionalist), organisations, like the League, promoting a cultural agenda were comparatively open and receptive to women.

The League encouraged female participation from the start and women filled prominent roles. Local notables, such as Lady Gregory in Galway, Lady Esmonde in County Wexford, and Mary Spring Rice in County Limerick, and others such as Máire Ní Shúilleabháin and Norma Borthwick, founded and led branches. In positions of trust, however, women remained a decided minority. At the annual national convention in 1906 women were elected to seven of the forty-five positions on the Gaelic League executive. Executive members included Máire Ní Chinnéide, Úna Ní Fhaircheallaigh (Agnes O'Farrelly, who wrote pamphlets on behalf of the League), Bean an Doc Uí Choisdealbha, Máire Ní hAodáin, Máire de Builtéir, Nellie O'Brien, Eibhlín Ní Dhonnabháin, and Eibhlín Nic Niocaill.

Máire de Builtéir, who is credited with suggesting the term Sinn Féin to Arthur Griffith, made it clear that women could make their contribution to the cultural revival without relinquishing their traditional roles. "Let it be thoroughly understood", she insisted, "that when Irish women are invited to take part in the language movement, they are not required to plunge into the vortex of public life. No the work they can best do is work to be done in the home. There mission is to make the homes of Ireland Irish".

=== Critical traditionalism ===
Formed in the wake of the disgrace and fall of the nationalist leader Charles Stewart Parnell and defeat of the second Home Rule Bill, the League drew upon a generation frustrated and disillusioned with electoral politics. But proponents of new and rival movements were sceptical of the cultural activism offered by the League.

Writing in Alice Milligan's Belfast monthly, labour and socialist leader James Connolly maintained that in the absence of a creed capable of challenging the rule of the capitalist, landlord and financier, the nationalism of the Irish language movement would achieve little. His friend and collaborator Frederick Ryan, secretary of the Irish National Theatre Society, acknowledged the "pathos" in that in "young men and women rushing to acquire the rudiments of Irish (and it seldom gets beyond that) in order to show that they are not as other nations", but suggested that it did not "correlate with the active desire for political freedom". Most leaders of the Gaelic League desired "a return to medievalism in thought, in literature, in pastimes, in music and even in dress", but a nation, he argued, is not morally raised by dwelling on its past. Rather it must deal with its present political, economic, and social problems, something of which Ireland is capable without assuming "the enormous burden of adopting what is now virtually a new language".

Patrick Pearse, who had joined the League while in his teens, responded in An Claidheamh Soluis by defending a "critical traditionalism". The cultural self-belief promoted by the League does not call for "folk attitudes of mind" or "folk conventions of form". Irish artists might have to "imbibe their Irishness from the peasant, since the peasants alone possess Irishism, but they need not and must not [...] be afraid of modern culture". Deriving "what is best in medieval Irish literature", the new Irish prose would be characterised by a "terseness", "crispness", and "plain straightforwardness" entirely conducive to the demands of the modern nation-state and economy.

=== In the Irish state ===
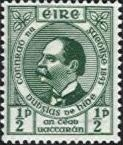
1943 stamp Douglas Hyde commemorating the Gaelic League

With the foundation of the Irish Free State, and its constitutional declaration of Irish as the "National language", many members believed that the Gaelic League had taken language revival as far as it could and that the task now fell to the new government. They ceased their League activities and were absorbed into the new political parties and into state bodies such as the Army, Police, Civil Service, and into the school system in which Irish was made compulsory. With the organisation paying a less prominent role in public life, It fared badly in the 1925 Seanad election. All its endorsed candidates, including Hyde, were rejected.

From 1926 there was growing disquiet among League members over the government's failure to implement the recommendations of its own Gaeltacht Commission. Despite the League having two of their own in key positions, Eoin MacNéill as Minister of Education and Ernest Blythe as Minister of Finance, the proposal for free secondary school education for Gaeltacht children (something that was not available anywhere in Ireland until the 1960s) was rejected.

The League was also alarmed by the Anglicising and cosmopolitan influences of state radio (great objection was made to its programming of Jazz). In 1927, An Coimisiún Le Rincí Gaelacha (CLRG) was founded as a subcommittee of the League to investigate the promotion of traditional Irish dance. Eventually, CLRG became a largely independent organisation, though it is required by its constitution to share three board members with the League.

The failure of the Cumann na nGaedheal government to commit to a more comprehensive programme for defending and promoting Irish and what was perceived, typically in conservative folk terms, as its supporting culture, helped rally support for de Valera's anti-Treaty republican party Fianna Fail. Partly in recognition of his services in the League services, under de Valera's 1937 constitution, Hyde served as the first President of Ireland from June 1938 to June 1945.

The new constitution declared (article 8) that, for Éire, Irish was "the first official language". Accordingly, the Fianna Fail government made it a compulsory school subject at both the primary and secondary level, required a measure of competency in the language for recruitment to posts in the civil service and used it in the official symbolisation of the regime (official titles, seals, coinage etc). Yet Gearóid Ó Tuathaigh records that many "ardent revivalists" were not satisfied. The ethos of the state, pervading its social legislation, education system social mores and public culture, remained distinctively religious/confessional, Catholic (and English-speaking), rather than Gaelic.

=== Contemporary campaigns for language rights ===
Conradh na Gaeilge, in alliance with other groups such as Gluaiseacht Chearta Sibhialta na Gaeltachta, was instrumental in the community campaigns which led to the creation of RTÉ Raidió na Gaeltachta (1972), Údarás na Gaeltachta (1980), and TG4 (1996). The organisation successfully campaigned for the enactment of the Official Languages Act, 2003 which gave greater statutory protection to Irish speakers and created the position of An Coimisinéir Teanga (the Languages Commissioner). Conradh na Gaeilge was among the principal organisations responsible for co-ordinating the successful campaign to make Irish an official language of the European Union.

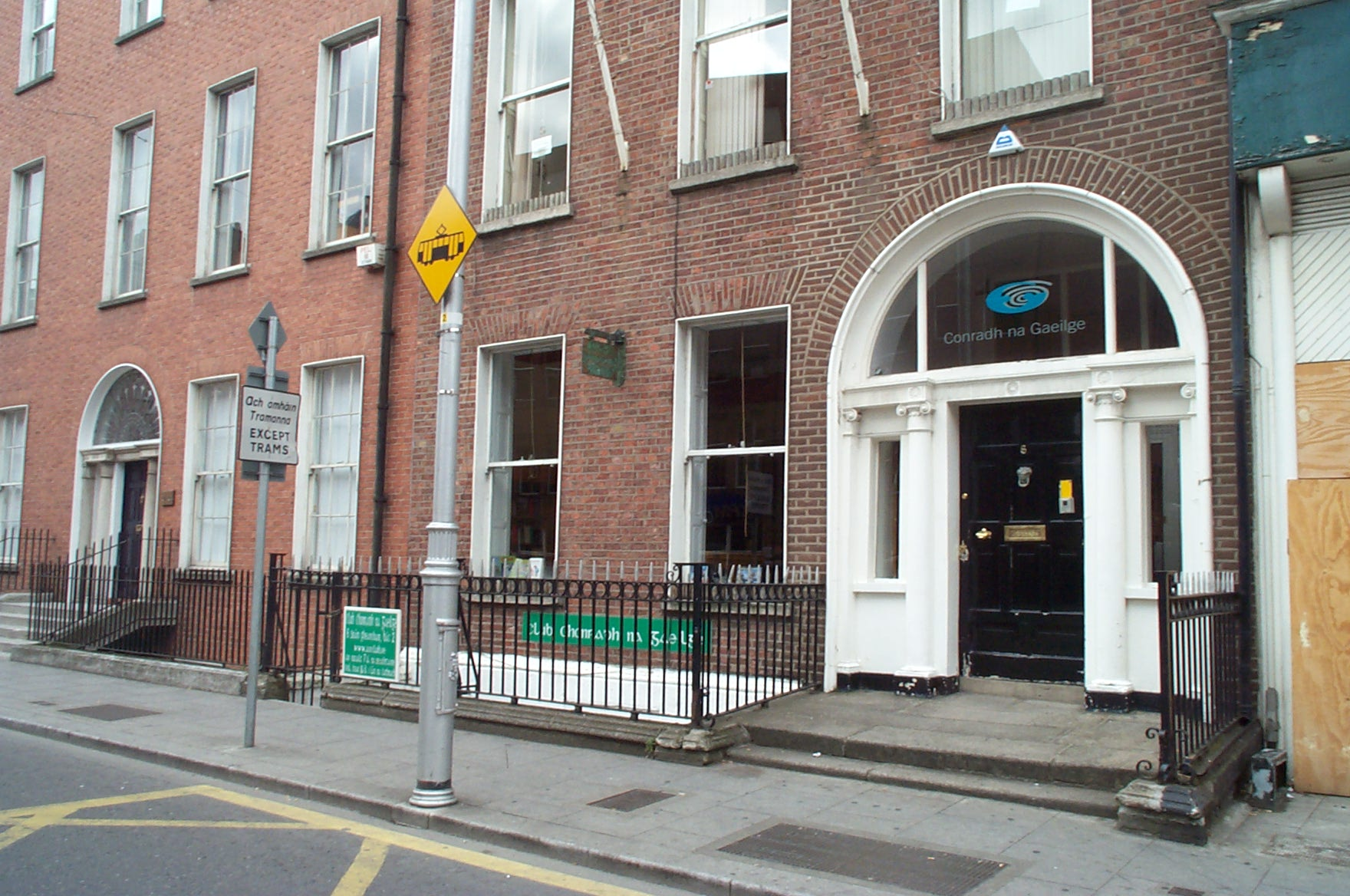
Conradh na Gaeilge, Dublin

In 2008, during the presidency of Dáithí Mac Cárthaigh, Conradh na Gaeilge adopted a new constitution reverting to its pre-1915 non-political stance, restating its aim as that of an Irish-speaking Ireland "Is í aidhm na hEagraíochta an Ghaeilge a athréimniú mar ghnáththeanga na hÉireann" ("It is the aim of the Organisation to reinstate the Irish language as the everyday language of Ireland") and dropping any reference to Irish freedom.

In recent years, Conradh na Gaeilge has remained central to campaigns to protect language rights throughout Ireland. This strategy encompasses the promotion of increased investment in Gaeltacht areas, advocacy for increased provision of state services through Irish, the development of Irish language hubs in urban areas, and the Acht Anois campaign for the enactment of an Irish Language Act to protect the language in Northern Ireland.

The decision of the Democratic Unionist Party to resist a stand-alone Irish Language Act, in part by insisting on compensating provisions for Ulster Scots, became one of the principal, publicly acknowledged, sticking points in the three years of on and off again negotiations required to restore the power-sharing executive in 2020. The 2020 New Decade, New Approach agreement promised both the Irish language and Ulster-Scots new Commissioners to "support" and "enhance" their development but does not accord them equal legal status. While Ulster Scots was to be recognised as a regional or minority language for the "encouragement" and "facilitation" purposes of Part II of the European Charter for Regional or Minority Languages, provision for Irish was to meet the more stringent Part III obligations in respect of education, media and administration.

In 2022, with unionist protest against the Northern Ireland Protocol having resulted in a further suspension of devolved government, the United Kingdom Parliament incorporated the language provisions of New Decade, New Approach in the Identity and Language (Northern Ireland) Act. The president of the Conradh na Gaeilge, Paula Melvin, hailed the passing of the legislation, but said the bill was "not our final destination". The organisation would turn its attention to both implementing and to strengthening the legislation: "painful experience with the British government has taught us to take nothing for granted".

== Organisation and operations ==
=== Operations ===
Conradh today promotes the language and the rights of Irish speakers, and, as it has from inception, runs language classes. It also operates a bookshop, on Camden Street in central Dublin, and supports programmes in Irish for schools and other sectors. It is a co-sponsor of Raidio Ri-Ra, a musical radio station, and runs Seachtain na Gaeilge, a two-week festival of Irish around St. Patrick's Day.

There is a staff of a few dozen, with the general secretary assisted by a deputy, a head office co-ordinator, and various managers, co-ordinators and others.

=== Governance ===
The organisation is governed according to its constitution, and an annual meeting, the Ard-Fheis, with administration handled by an Executive Committee, and in between that committee's meetings, a Standing Committee. The leader of the national organisation is the president, with a deputy (tanaiste), both on the executive, and there is a managing role known as the ard-runai (general secretary). The organisation's head office is situated on Harcourt Street in Dublin, and it has offices in multiple locations across the island of Ireland.

=== Branches ===
Conradh na Gaeilge has over 150 branches across Ireland and the UK, which organise locally, and are governed by committee structures.

==== Ulster (including County Louth) ====
- County Antrim, 19 branches
- County Armagh, 4 branches
- County Cavan, 1 branch
- County Down, 8 branches
- County Donegal, 3 branches
- County Fermanagh 1 branch
- County Londonderry, 4 branches
- County Monaghan, 2 branches
- County Tyrone, 13 branches
- County Louth, 2 branches

==== Leinster (excluding County Louth) ====
- County Dublin, 21 branches
- County Carlow, 1 branch
- County Kilkenny, 1 branch
- County Kildare, 4 branches
- County Meath, 2 branches
- County Wexford, 2 branches

==== Munster ====
- County Clare, 5 branches
- County Cork, 12 branches
- County Kerry, 10 branches
- County Limerick, 6 branches
- County Tipperary, 6 branches
- County Waterford, 2 branches

==== Connacht ====
- County Galway, 17 branches
- County Leitrim, 1 branch
- County Mayo, 9 branches
- County Roscommon, 1 branch

==== Britain ====
- Glasgow, 1 branch
- Liverpool, 1 branch
- London, 1 branch

== Key people associated with Conradh ==
=== Presidents ===
- 1893–1915, Douglas Hyde
- 1916–1919, Eoin Mac Néill
- 1919–1922, Seán Ua Ceallaigh
- 1922–1925, Peadar Mac Fhionnlaoich
- 1925–1926, Seán P. Mac Énrí
- 1926-1928, Cormac Breathnach
- 1928–1933, Mac Giolla Bhríde
- 1933–1940, Peadar Mac Fhionnlaoich
- 1940–1941, Liam Ó Buachalla
- 1941–1942, Seán Óg Ó Tuama
- 1942–1945, Diarmuid Mac Fhionnlaoich
- 1945–1946, Seán Mac Gearailt
- 1946–1949, Liam Ó Luanaigh
- 1949–1950, Diarmuid Mac Fhionnlaoich
- 1950–1952, Annraoi Ó Liatháin
- 1952–1955, Seán Mac Gearailt
- 1955–1959, Tomás Ó Muircheartaigh
- 1959–1965, Micheál Mac Cárthaigh
- 1965–1968, Cathal Ó Feinneadha
- 1968–1974, Maolsheachlainn Ó Caollaí
- 1974–1979, Pádraig Ó Snodaigh
- 1979–1982, Albert Fry
- 1982–1985, Micheál Ó Murchú
- 1985–1989, Íte Ní Chionnaith
- 1989–1994, Proinsias Mac Aonghusa
- 1994–1995, Áine de Baróid
- 1995-1998, Gearóid Ó Cairealláin
- 1998–2003, Tomás Mac Ruairí
- 2003–2004, Séagh Mac Siúrdáin
- 2004–2005, Nollaig Ó Gadhra
- 2005–2008, Dáithí Mac Cárthaigh
- 2008–2011, Pádraig Mac Fhearghusa
- 2011–2014, Donnchadh Ó hAodha
- 2014–2017, Cóilín Ó Cearbhaill
- 2017–2022, Niall Comer
- 2022–2025, Paula Melvin
- 2025–present, Ciarán Mac Giolla Bhéin

== See also ==
- An Comunn Gàidhealach
- Foras na Gaeilge
- Mháirín Óg Ní Cheallaigh
- Yn Çheshaght Ghailckagh

=== Irish-language bibliography ===
- Mac Aonghusa, Proinsias (1993). Ar son na Gaeilge: Conradh na Gaeilge 1893-1993. Conradh na Gaeilge. ASIN B001A49CUY.
- Mac Fhearghusa, Pádraig (1995). Conradh na Gaeilge i gCiarrai. Conradh na Gaeilge. ASIN B0010DRN88.
- Mac Giolla Domhnaigh, Gearóid (1995). Conradh Gaeilge Chúige Uladh ag tús an 20ú chéid. Comhaltas Uladh de Chonradh na Gaeilge. ISBN 0951726412.
- O'Riordain, Traolach (2000). Conradh na Gaeilge i gCorcaigh 1894-1910. Cois Life Teoranta. ISBN 1901176177.
- Ó Súilleabháin, Donncha (1989). Conradh na Gaeilge i Londain 1894-1917. Conradh na Gaeilge. ASIN B009QZETH0.
