= Mháirín Óg Ní Cheallaigh =

Historic Irish folk song

"Mháirín Óg Ní Cheallaigh" (IPA:[ˈwaːɾʲiːnʲˈoːɡˈnʲiːˈçal̪ˠiː]) is a 17th-century Irish folk song. It was collected in County Tyrone between 1908 and 1914 by the Gaelic League. Philip Ua Bhaldra was the collector, he being active in the area from 1906 to 1921.

The song concerns the separation of a Rapparee from his lover, Mháirín Óg Ní Cheallaigh, daughter of the Ó Chellaigh of Mountbellew, in the aftermath of the Battle of Aughrim, 12 July 1691.

== See also ==
- Tomás Bán Mac Aodhagáin
- Dónal Ó Maoláine
- Éamonn an Chnoic
- Peigín Leitir Móir
