= Kathleen Dolan =

Irish radio announcer (1921–2003)

- Born: 11 April 1921; Church Street, Strabane, County Tyrone, Ireland
- Died: 2003 (aged 81–82); Dublin, Ireland
- Burial place: Glasnevin Cemetery
- Education: Loreto College, St Stephen's Green

Kathleen Dolan (11 April 1921 – February 2003) was an Irish radio announcer, and RTÉ's first female announcer.

== Early life and family ==
Kathleen Dolan was born on Church Street, Strabane, County Tyrone, Ireland, on 11 April 1921. Her parents were James Dolan and Kathleen Theresa Maude (née Reid). She had a sister and a brother. Her brother was a national school teacher but went on to become secretary of the Irish Agricultural Wholesale Society, part of the Irish co-operative movement. The family moved to Dublin, where her father died in 1924 aged 35. Dolan attended Loreto College, St Stephen's Green, Dublin. She spent time near Rouen, France, to improve her French, returning to Ireland just as World War II broke out.

She married Robin (Robert Hartpole Hamilton) McDonnell (1909–1984) in SS Alphonsus and Columba church, Ballybrack in February 1950 and they went on to have two sons. Her father-in-law was Randal McDonnell, and the McDonnell family were relatives of the Earl of Antrim. Robin assumed the title of count in later life, known as Count Robert McDonnell of the Glens. After her husband's death, Dolan returned to Ireland in 1984. She died in February 2003 at her home in Dublin, and is buried in Glasnevin Cemetery.

== Career ==
Dolan joined Radio Éireann as a reserve announcer in 1944, despite the fact that she was under the minimum age of appointment at the time. Owing to her speaking voice, she became an announcer and newsreader. She was presenter of the weekly Hospitals' requests programme, Radio Éireann most popular show, for six years. She was an active supporter of medical charities, helping Frank Cahill to organise a concert in Dublin's Capitol Cinema in aid of the Post Sanatorium League in 1949. The money raised helped establish the Rehabilitation Institute in Dublin the same year.

She resigned from Radio Éireann in 1950 in order to marry. She returned to present Between ourselves, a weekly women's magazine programme, on Radio Éireann in 1953. She left again when she and her husband moved to England in 1956. Dolan wrote children's stories one of which, Sean the leprechaun, was produced in 1971 as a cartoon for television in English and Welsh.
