= Seán Mac Giollarnáth =

Irish folklorist

- Born: 1880
- Died: 29 January 1970 (aged 89–90)
- Writing career
- Language: Irish
- Genre: Folklore

Seán Mac Giollarnáth (1880-29 January 1970) was an Irish folklorist.

A native of Coill an Bhogaigh, Gurteen, Ballinasloe, Mac Giollarnáth lived for a time in London before moving to Dublin where he taught at St. Enda's, Rathfarnham. From 1909 to 1916 he was editor of An Claidheamh Soluis. He acted as a courier for the Old I.R.A. during the Irish War of Independence. In 1923 he was appointed District Justice, which he held till he retired in 1950.

He held a lifelong interest in wildlife and folklore, which formed the basis for much of his published work. He was awarded an LL.D by the National University of Ireland in the 1960s.

== Select bibliography ==
- Fi-Fa-Fum. In bhfuil Seanann agus an giosadan ponaire [and other tales], Baile Atha Cliath, 1931
- Loinnir Mac Leabhair agus scealta gaisgidh eile, Oifig an tSolathair, Baile Atha Cliath, 1936
- Feilre na n-ean, Oifig an tSolathair, 1940
- Cudar agus scealta eile, Baile Atha Claith, 1949
