= Sin Newspaper =

Student newspaper in Galway, Ireland

SIN
- Galway's Only Student Newspaper
- Type: Online student newspaper
- Format: Tabloid
- School: University of Galway
- Editor-in-chief: Finn Brady
- Founded: 2001
- Language: English and Gaeilge
- Headquarters: Áras na Mac Léinn; University of Galway; Galway, Ireland
- Circulation: 6,000
- Website: sin.ie

Location of Áras na Mac Léinn, Galway, Ireland.

SIN (Student Independent News) is a student newspaper in Galway, Ireland with a readership of 15,000 students. Its offices are based at the University of Galway. SIN is published online and covers news about Galway events on and off campus, while its entertainment and features sections aim to entertain and provoke debate and shape opinion. It is produced solely online following the COVID-19 pandemic. Both the newspaper and website are funded by the University of Galway Students' Union. SIN accepts articles from past and present students and lecturers and staff. SIN was founded in 2001 and replaced the University College Galway student periodical Unity, which was published from 1959 until the late 1990s. SIN was printed in tabloid size across 32 pages until 2020.

== Online presence ==
The SIN website, Sin.ie, hosts a gallery, articles, author profiles, newspaper archives.

== Recognition ==
In 2019, SIN was named Newspaper of the Year, with editor Áine Kenny winning the prize for Editor of the Year, at the National Student Media Awards.

In 2023, SIN and Sin.ie received nominations for Journalism relating to Travel, Features Writer of the Year (Arts & Pop Culture), and Journalism relating to Road Safety, with Caoimhe Looney winning for the latter, at the National Student Media Awards.

In 2025, editor Emma van Oosterhout and news sub-editor Fiona Zokou won the National Student Media Award for Collaborative Journalism of the Year Award. In the same year, SIN was awarded 'Student Media Outlet of the Year' by AMLÉ.

In 2026, a record-breaking 15 Galway students were nominated for the National Student Media Awards, 12 of whom were nominated for their work with SIN.

== Notable past stories ==
On 9 December 2008, Ministers Eamon O'Cuiv and Batt O'Keefe were the subject of a protest by a small group of students who were highlighting the issue of third level fees. During Minister O'Cuiv's attempt to enter the Quadrangle to meet with University authorities, the students attempted to block his entrance. The minister engaged in a scuffle and was seen to forcibly grab a student protester, which was photographed by the SIN editor. The photograph was used on the RTÉ News website, The Irish Times and appeared in many other local and national papers and news sites. The story was picked up by the national press and the minister was forced to explain his actions in the photograph.

SIN also reported on an incident that took place on 2 February 2009 when former Taoiseach Bertie Ahern was prevented from speaking at the university's Literary and Debating Society, again by a small group of protesters involved in the free fees movement. SIN had a full report of the incident on its website within twenty minutes of the incident; the report was cited in several of the subsequent local and national coverage of the incident.

Following the controversial RAG week of 2009, SIN and Sin.ie provided comprehensive coverage of the university's decision to withdraw support and NUI Galway Students' Union commitment to continue running the charity week in future years.

== Editorial team ==
As of September 2026, the editorial team consists of:

- Finn Brady (Editor-in-Chief)
- Sonny McGreevy (Deputy Editor and Sports Editor)
- Jake Davis (News Editor)
- Emma Blighe (Features Editor)
- Aicha Chalouche (Opinion Editor)
- J.J. O'Regan (Arts Editor)
- Dylan Murphy & Jason Mullins (Business and Technology Editor)
- Hannah Feeney (Lifestyle Editor)
- Kate Ní Dhomhnaill & Leo Oisíneach Mac an tSaoir (Gaeilge Editor)
- Jamie Daly (Sports Editor)
- Emma O'Neill (Creative Corner Editor)
- Saoirse Jaago & Eamon Chin (Social Media)
- Jake Galvin (Photography)

== See also ==
- Flirt FM
