= Annraoi Ó Liatháin =

Irish writer and film narrator

Annraoi Ó Liatháin (15 October 1917 – 27 July 1981) was an Irish writer and film narrator.

== Early life ==
Born in Portumna, County Galway to Michael Lyons and Annie McKee. His family moved to Waterford when he was a child, and he attended primary school there. On graduating in 1931, he spent five years as a novice with the Congregation of Christian Brothers in Tullow, County Carlow, and in Youghal.

== Career ==
Having left the seminary, he entered the Irish Civil Service in 1936. After a period of time working at the Property Valuation Office, he moved into the dictionary team at the Department of Education (An Roinn Oideachais).

During his career as a writer, he wrote exclusively in his native Irish language. He produced a number of novels aimed at teenagers, as well as collaborated on a number of books on the natural world. He was also president of Conradh na Gaeilge from 1952 to 1955.

== Personal life ==
Ó Liatháin married Margaret Fox of Ballymote, County Sligo in 1949, and they went on to have eight children. He died on the 27th of July, 1981.

== Bibliography ==
- Oscar (1954)
- Laochra na Machairí (1958)
- Claíomh an Díoltais (1961)
- Cois Móire (1964)
- An Tíogar Daonna (1966)
- Dún na Cinniúna (1966) - ISBN 9780862895150
- Luaithreach an Bhua (1969) - ISBN 9780862895105
- An Bradán agus Iascaireacht an Bhradáin (Sáirséal agus Dill, 1970) - ISBN 0902563092
- Buíon Éireannach in Albain (1975) - ISBN 0902563548
- Nead na gCreabhar (1977) - ISBN 9780902563636
- Cois tSiúire (1982)
