= Máire Ní Chinnéide =

Gaelic games administrator and Irish language activist

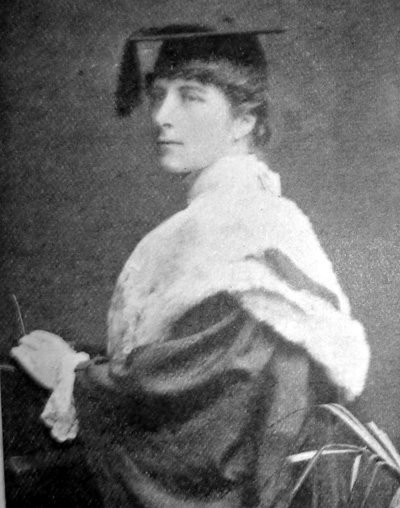
- Máire Ní Chinéide at her graduation

Camogie Association of Ireland
- In office 1905–1909
- Succeeded by: Elizabeth Burke-Plunkett

Personal details
- Born: 17 January 1879 Rathmines, County Dublin
- Died: 25 May 1967 (aged 88) Dublin, Ireland
- Spouse: Sean MacGearailt (1878–1955)
- Children: Niamh NicGearailt
- Profession: Irish language activist

Máire Ní Chinnéide (English Mary or Molly O'Kennedy) (17 January 1879 – 25 May 1967) was an Irish language activist, playwright, first President of the Camogie Association and first woman president of Oireachtas na Gaeilge.

Máire was born in Rathmines in 1879 and attended Muckross Park College and Royal University (later the NUI) where she was a classmate of Agnes O'Farrelly, Helena Concannon, and Hanna Sheehy-Skeffington.

== Irish language ==
Máire learned Irish on holiday in Ballyvourney and earned the first scholarship in Irish from the Royal University, worth £100 a year, which was spent on visits to the Irish college in Ballingeary.

She studied in the school of Old Irish established by professor Osborn Bergin and was strongly influenced by the Irish-Australian professor O'Daly. She later taught Latin through Irish at Ballingeary and became proficient in French, German, Italian and Spanish.

She spent the last £100 of her scholarship on a dowry for her marriage to Sean MacGearailt, later first Accountant General of Revenue in the Irish Civil Service, with whom she lived originally in Glasnevin and then in Dalkey.

She was a founder member of the radical Craobh an Chéitinnigh, the Keating branch of the Gaelic League (Conradh na Gaelige), composed mainly of Dublin-based Kerry people and regarded, by themselves at least, as the intellectual focus of the League.

== Camogie ==
In August 1904, some six years after the establishment of the earliest women's hurling teams, the rules of camogie (then called camoguidheacht), first appeared in Banba, a journal produced by Craobh an Chéitinnigh. Camogie had come to public attention when it was showcased at the annual Oireachtas (Gaelic League Festival) earlier that year, and it differed from men's hurling in its use of a lighter ball and a smaller playing-field. Máire Ní Chinnéide and Cáit Ní Dhonnchadha (like Ní Chinnéide, an Irish-language enthusiast and cultural nationalist), were credited with having created the game, with the assistance of Ní Dhonnchadha's scholarly brother Tadhg Ó Donnchadha, who drew up its rules. She was on the first camogie team to play an exhibition match in Navan in July 1904, became an early propagandist for the game and, in 1905 was elected president of the infant Camogie Association. She wrote:

"all existing games were passed in review, but it was felt from the first that Hurling was the model on which the new game should be formed.” Initial matches were played on the grounds of Mr O’Dowd in Drumcondra Park, but “the place was not very suitable and players did not join in any numbers until the Keating Camoguidhthe betook themselves to the Phoenix Park, where they have a convenient ground well off the main road."

== Gaelic League ==
Máire later served as Vice-President of Craobh an Chéitinnigh, to Cathal Brugha. She was active in Cumann na mBan during the Irish War of Independence and took the pro-treaty side during the civil war and attempted to set up a woman's organisation "in support of the Free State" alongside Jennie Wyse Power.

== Peig Sayers ==
Máire first visited the Blasket Islands in 1932 with her daughter Niamh, who was to die tragically young. In the summer of 1934, Máire Bean Nic Gearailt as she was then, who had known Peig Sayers, put the idea into the old woman's head to write a memoir. According to a later interview with Ní Chinnéide

"she knew and admired her gift for easy conversation, her gracious charm as a hostess, her talent for illustrating a point she was making by a story out of her own experience that was as rich in philosophy and thought as it was limited geographically."

Peig answered that she had "nothing to write." She had learned only to read and write in English at school and most of it was forgotten.

Máire Ní Chinnéide suggested Peig should dictate her memoir to her son Micheal, known to everyone on the island as An File ("The Poet"), but Peig "only shook her head doubtfully." At Christmas, a packet arrived from the Blaskets with a manuscript, Máire transcribed it word for word and in summer brought it back to the Blaskets to read it to Peig.

She then edited the manuscript for the Talbot Press. Peig became well known as a prescribed text on the Leaving Certificate curriculum in Irish.

== Writing ==
Máire had an acting part in the first modern play performed in Irish on the stage, Casadh an tSugáin by Douglas Hyde in 1901. She was later author of children's plays staged by An Comhar Drámuidhachta at the Oireachtas and the Peacock Theatre, of which Gleann na Sidheóg and An Dúthchas (1908) were published. She was a broadcaster in Irish on 2RN/Radio Éireann after its foundation in 1926 and author of a translation of Grimms' Fairy Tales (1923). She was president of the Gaelic Players Dramatic group during the 1930s and a founder of the Gaelic Writers Association in 1939.

Ní Chinnéide soon became interested in writing children's plays, including "Gleann na Sidheóg" [Fairy Glen] (1905) and "Sidheoga na mBláth" [Flower Fairies] (1909). Although there is little information available on the staging of Ní Chinnéide's first play, by the time her second children's play, Sidheóga na mBláth, was published in An Claidheamh Soluis in December 1907, "Éire Óg" ["Young Ireland"] branches of the Gaelic League had been established in conjunction with adults' branches. P.H. Pearse in particular voiced the expectation that this play would be staged by many "Éire Óg" branches "before the New Year is very old," thus indicating the immediate take up of such plays. Indeed, a week after the play's publication, it was staged in the Dominican College in Donnybrook, Dublin, where Ní Chinnéide had spent several years as an Irish teacher.

== Personal life ==
She died on 25 April 1967 and is buried in Deans Grange Cemetery.

== Trophy ==
In 2007 the camogie trophy for the annual inter-county All Ireland Championship for counties graded Junior B was named in her honour.

== Publications ==
- Gleann na Sidheóg. (Dublin : Muintir na Leabhar Gaedhilge, 1905).
- An Dúthchas: dráma éin-ghníomha. (Dublin: Connradh na Gaedhilge, 1908).
- Scéalta ó Ghrimm (Jacob Grimm 1785–1863) (Translation, Dublin: Conradh na Gaedhilge, 1923).
- Peig i a scéal féin do scríobh Peig Sayers; (Edited, Dublin, Talbot Press 1936, and subsequent editions)
