= Muckross Park College =

All-girls Catholic secondary school in Ireland

- Irish: Páirc Mhucrois

Location
- Donnybrook, Dublin 4 Ireland; 53.3224°N 6.2416°W

Information
- Former name: St. Mary's University College
- Type: Private secondary school
- Motto: Latin: Veritas (Truth)
- Denomination: Dominicans
- Established: 1900; 126 years ago
- Principal: Siobhan Kelly
- Gender: Girls
- Enrollment: 712 (2026)
- Colours: Green, White and Black
- Website: muckrossparkcollege.com

Muckross Park College (Irish: Páirc Mhucrois) is a private non fee paying Catholic secondary school for girls, located in Donnybrook, Dublin, Ireland. It was founded in 1900 and is one of a number of Dominican schools in Ireland. As of 2026, it had a student body of 712.

The school is involved in a number sports tournaments, including in hockey, tennis, and basketball. Academically, the school has historically ranked highly in The Irish Times list of feeder schools for third-level education in Ireland.

== History ==
The school was founded in 1900 as St. Mary's University College, which was initially a third-level college for women studying for degrees awarded by the Royal University of Ireland.

== Curriculum ==
First, second and third years undertake the Junior Cycle curriculum in preparation for the Junior Certificate Examination.

Transition year (TY) consists of organising work placements several times throughout the year, as well as a school trip abroad. TY students may also undertake dance and drama classes at the nearby Independent Theatre Workshop studios. Other TY class modules include cooking, horticulture, yearbook, film making, and fitness.

Fifth and sixth years are spent preparing students for the Leaving Certificate Examinations.

== Extra-curricular activities ==
=== Clubs and events ===
There are a number of clubs in the school, including a book club.

Events during the school year include an annual mass, a Halloween dress-up day and a sports day. The school also undertakes retreats and trips, including for transition year students.

=== Sport ===
Muckross Park fields hockey teams at Minor, Junior and Senior levels, and has won a number of Leinster League titles. The Senior 1 team has also claimed the Senior Cup on several occasions. Other sports include basketball, cricket, handball, tennis, swimming, horse-riding and athletics.

== Past Pupils' Union ==
The Past Pupils' Union (PPU) began in 1912, twelve years after the school was founded. The PPU is involved in fundraising for a fund which is used to grant financial assistance to past pupils who find themselves in financial difficulty. Over the years, the fund has been used to support past pupils who have been impacted by serious illness, disability, bereavement and unemployment. It has also supported the education of students in need and other charitable causes.

== Notable alumnae ==
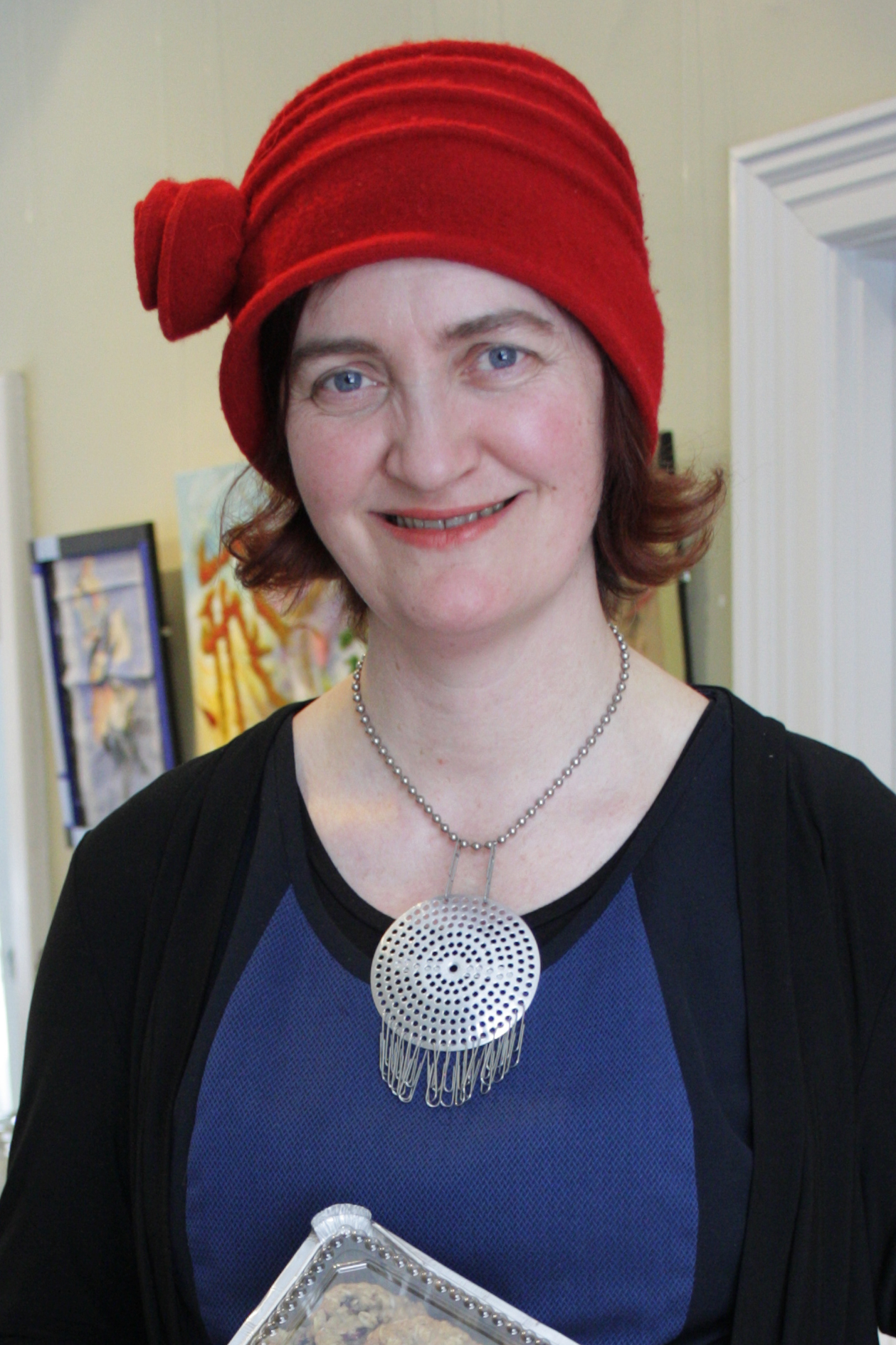
Author Emma Donoghue, Muckross past pupil

- Anna O'Flanagan, Irish international hockey player
- Beatrice Doran, former chief librarian at the Royal College of Surgeons in Ireland
- Dara Fitzpatrick, Irish Coastguard helicopter pilot
- Emma Donoghue, author of the book "Room", shortlisted for the Man-Booker prize
- Gemma O'Doherty, far-right activist and former journalist
- Mary Rose Gearty, judge of the Irish High Court
- Máire Ní Chinnéide, Irish language activist, playwright, president of the Camogie Association, and first female president of Oireachtas na Gaeilge
- Nuala Carey, weather presenter on RTÉ
- Síofra O'Leary, judge at the European Court of Human Rights

== See also ==
- Education in the Republic of Ireland
- List of Catholic schools in Ireland by religious order
