= Mary Rose Gearty =

Irish barrister, High Court judge since 2019

The Hon. Ms. Justice Mary Rose Gearty

Judge of the High Court
- Incumbent
- Assumed office 2 December 2019
- Nominated by: Government of Ireland
- Appointed by: Michael D. Higgins

Personal details
- Education: University College Dublin; King's Inns; King's College London

Mary Rose Gearty is an Irish judge and lawyer who has served as a Judge of the High Court since December 2019. She was previously practiced as a barrister involved primarily in criminal trials involving serious offences.

== Education ==
Gearty attended secondary school at Muckross Park College and she obtained a BCL law degree from University College Dublin in 1990. She subsequently studied at the King's Inns, where her cousin Conor Gearty was among her lecturers, and King's College London.

== Legal career ==
She was called to the Bar in 1992 and commenced practice in 1993, predominantly on the Dublin Circuit. She became a senior counsel in 2009.

Gearty specialised in criminal law. She prosecuted and defended in trials involving murder, manslaughter and sexual offences.

She was one of two senior counsels to act for the Director of Public Prosecutions in the prosecution of David Drumm. After 86 days of trial, he was found guilty of false accounting and conspiracy to defraud the public. She acted for the DPP in actions arising from the prosecution of Tony Walsh.

In 2014, she was appointed by the Minister for Justice and Equality as the sole member and chair of the MacLochlainn Commission. Her role was to investigate the shooting of Ronan MacLochlainn by members of the Garda Síochána in 1998 during an attempted robbery. After receiving four extensions, her final report was published in December 2018. She found that the shooting was justified but that the Garda investigation had deficiencies. She provided legal advice for a scoping inquiry into the CervicalCheck cancer scandal.

She served as vice chair of the Bar Council and during her time as a barrister chaired committees on internal and external relations, advanced advocacy, and professional services. She was a director of Our Lady's Hospice, filling a vacancy left by Donal O'Donnell. She lectured at the King's Inns and Griffith College Dublin and was a founder of the Irish Criminal Bar Association.

== Judicial career ==
Gearty was appointed to the High Court in December 2019. She has heard cases involving tax law, judicial review, family law, injunctions, bail and defamation.

Since 2020, she is the Director of Judicial Studies for the Irish judiciary. She is the judge in charge of the Hague Convention List of the High Court.
