= An Claidheamh Soluis =

Irish-speaking weekly newspaper from 1899 to 1931

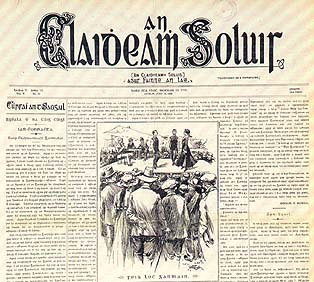
- Type: Weekly newspaper
- Format: Broadsheet
- Owner: Conradh na Gaeilge
- Editor: Pádraig Pearse, Eoin Mac Néill
- Founded: 1899
- Ceased publication: 1931
- Political alignment: Nationalist / Republican

An Claidheamh Soluis (Irish: [ənˠ ˌklˠiːw ˈsˠɔlˠəʃ]) was an Irish nationalist newspaper published in the early 20th century by Conradh na Gaeilge (the Gaelic League). It was named for the "Sword of Light" (in modern spelling Claíomh Solais) of Gaelic myth.

Eoin MacNeill was its first editor, overseeing its publication from 1899 to 1901. In 1900 the League took control of the weekly bilingual paper Fáinne an Lae, when its editor went bankrupt. Fáinne an Lae was merged with An Claidheamh Soluis under the title An Claidheamh Soluis agus Fáinne an Lae.

From, 1903 to 1909 the paper was edited by Pádraig Pearse, the teacher and barrister who later became a key figure in the Easter Rising in 1916. Under his editorship the paper played a prominent role in the Irish Literary Revival, publishing original literary works in both Irish and English and devoting considerable space to commentary on cultural matters. From 1909 to 1916 the editor was Seán Mac Giollarnáth.

The paper continued under the names Fáinne an Lae (1918–19, 1922–30) and Misneach (1919–22), reverting briefly to An Claidheamh Soluis in 1930–31. It was discontinued after 1932.
