= Gearóid Ó Tuathaigh =

Irish academic

Gearóid Ó Tuathaigh is Professor Emeritus in History and former Dean of Arts and Vice-President of NUI Galway. He was appointed to the Council of State by the President of Ireland, Michael D. Higgins in 2012.

Ó Tuathaigh graduated with a BA from NUIG followed by an MA. He completed his postgraduate studies at Peterhouse, Cambridge. He received an Honorary Doctorate from National University of Ireland in 2017.
