= Edward MacGennis =

Irish prelate

- Bishop of Kilmore
- Church: Catholic Church
- Diocese: Diocese of Kilmore
- In office: 21 February 1888 – 15 May 1906
- Predecessor: Bernard Finegan
- Successor: Andrew Boylan

Orders
- Ordination: 1870
- Consecration: 15 April 1888 by Michael Logue

Personal details
- Born: 3 April 1847 Kilmore, County Cavan, United Kingdom of Great Britain and Ireland
- Died: 15 May 1906 (aged 59)

Styles of Edward MacGennis
- Reference style: The Most Reverend
- Spoken style: My Lord
- Religious style: Bishop

Edward MacGennis (1847–1906) was an Irish prelate of the Roman Catholic Church who served as the Bishop of Kilmore from 1888 to 1906.

Born in the parish of Kilmore, County Cavan, Ireland on 3 April 1847, he was educated at St Patrick's College, Cavan and St Patrick's College, Maynooth. He was ordained to the priesthood in circa 1870. MacGennis was the parish priest of Drumlane from 1886 to 1888. He was appointed the Bishop of the Diocese of Kilmore by Pope Leo XIII on 21 February 1888 and was consecrated on 15 April 1888.

Bishop MacGennis died in office on 15 May 1906, aged 59.

== Notes ==
Catholic Church titles
Preceded by Bernard Finegan	Bishop of Kilmore; 1888–1906	Succeeded by Andrew Boylan
