= Patrick Finegan =

Irish bishop

The Most Reverend Patrick Finegan
- Roman Catholic Diocese of Kilmore
- Church: Catholic Church
- Diocese: Diocese of Kilmore
- In office: 1910–1937; (died)
- Predecessor: Andrew Boylan
- Successor: Patrick Lyons (bishop of Kilmore)

Orders
- Ordination: 18 Dec 1881
- Consecration: 11 Sept 1910 by Patrick O'Donnell (cardinal)

Personal details
- Born: 17 August 1858 Cavan
- Died: Cavan

Styles of Patrick Finegan
- Reference style: The Most Reverend
- Spoken style: My Lord
- Religious style: Bishop

Patrick Finegan (1858–1937) was an Irish prelate of the Roman Catholic Church who served as the Bishop of Kilmore from 1910 to 1937.

== Early life and education ==
Born on 16 August 1858 in the townland of Corlurgan in County Cavan, in the parish of Urney and Annagelliff, the son of James Finegan and Mary O'Reilly of Corlurgan. He educated at Kilmore Academy and St. Patrick's College, Cavan which replaced it as the Diocesan School and seminary, he was ordained a priest for the Diocese of Kilmore by Bishop Nicholas Conaty on 18 December 1881.

His relative Bernard Finegan served for little over a year as Bishop of Kilmore and the young priest served him briefly as secretary.

He ministered in the parishes of Annagh, Cavan, Knockninny and Templeport and was serving as parish priest of Ballinamore from 30 October 1908 until 13 August 1910 when he was appointed Bishop of Kilmore. An illuminated address congratulating him on his appointment and praying his "piety, scholarship and patriotism" was presented to him by the people of Ballinamore and was returned to the area a century later.

== Bishop of Kilmore ==
He was appointed the Bishop of the Diocese of Kilmore by Pope Pius X on 11 September 1910. Finegan's episcopal consecration took place on 11 September 1910; the principal consecrator was Patrick O'Donnell, Bishop of Raphoe (later Archbishop of Armagh), and the principal co-consecrators were Joseph Hoare, Bishop of Ardagh and Clonmacnoise and Laurence Gaughran, Bishop of Meath.

He invited the Norbertine order to his diocese in 1924 and they created the Priory at Kilnacrott, Co Cavan as well as an adjacent secondary school, St Norbert's College. [It was from this Abbey that the notorious sexual predator priest Fr Brendan Smyth would later settle and operate.]

Bishop Finegan died in office on 25 January 1937, aged 78. He remained a priest for 55 years and a bishop for 26 years.

== Notes ==
Catholic Church titles
Preceded by Andrew Boylan	Bishop of Kilmore; 1910–1937	Succeeded by Patrick Lyons
