= Edmund MacGauran =

Irish Roman Catholic bishop

The Most Reverend Edmund MacGauran
- Archbishop of Armagh; Primate of All Ireland
- Church: Roman Catholic
- Archdiocese: Armagh
- Appointed: 1 July 1587
- Term ended: 23 June 1593
- Predecessor: Richard Creagh
- Successor: Peter Lombard
- Previous post: Bishop of Ardagh (1581–87)

Personal details
- Born: c. 1548 County Cavan, Ireland
- Died: 23 June 1593 (aged c. 45)

Edmund MacGauran (Irish: Émonn Mác Shamhradháin; also anglicised Magauran, Mac Gauran, McGovern; c. 1548 – 23 June [N.S. 3 July] 1593) was the Roman Catholic Archbishop of Armagh, Ireland from 1587 to 1593 and Bishop of Ardagh from 1581 to 1587.

== Birth ==
Edmund MacGauran (his Gaelic name was Émonn Mác Shamhradháin) was a member of the McGovern clan, who were the rulers in the Middle Ages of the tuath of Teallach n-Eachach in Breifne (now Tullyhaw, County Cavan, Ireland). There are no particulars surviving relating to his birth apart from the fact that he was born about 1548 of legitimate birth from a noble family in Kilmore diocese (according to the Consistorial Acts appointing him as Archbishop of Armagh). However it is likely he was born in the Barony of Tullyhaw which formed the McGovern territorial lands at that time. The surviving McGovern genealogies do not name him specifically, but he would have been in about the 14th generation of descent from Samhradhán, the patriarch of the clan, who flourished c. 1100.

The name Edmund was common among the McGovern clan in Tullyhaw during the Archbishop's lifetime, as we can see from the 1586 Fiants of Queen Elizabeth I of England which list, inter alia, "Edmund son of Brian son of Thomas Magawran of Lisanover, Tullyhaw; Cormock son of Edmund son of Shanglas Magawran of Gortmoye" (probably now Gortmore, Tullyhaw) and "Edmund son of Cormuck son of Ferrall Magawran of Kilfert" (now Kilnavert, Tullyhaw).

The McGovern chief of Tullyhaw about the time of Edmund's birth was Uaithne Mág Samhradháin. In the 1590s when he was archbishop, Edmund MacGauran sought refuge among his McGovern kinsmen while hiding from the English government. The 1930s Dúchas folklore collection remembers the incident as- "Edward McGovern. Primate of Ireland, was slain by Sir William Russell in 1593. During the time he was in hiding he had a hiding-place beside the present well of Eshveagh in Glangevlin." In a letter dated 26 May 1592 a reference is made to his sisters and mother still living.

Styles of Edmund MacGauran
- Reference style: The Most Reverend
- Spoken style: Your Grace or Archbishop

== Priesthood ==
When he completed his secular education, Edmund followed the well-beaten path to Europe and joined a seminary to study for the priesthood, probably in Spain as he had Spanish friends and visited there regularly. He was not educated at any of the Iberian Irish colleges as they had not been founded at the time of his ordination. His particular friend in Spain was Juan de Sanclemente Torquemada, Archbishop of the Roman Catholic Archdiocese of Santiago de Compostela who was educated at the University of Alcalá de Henares in Spain so it is likely Magauran was also educated there. If not then possibly at Salamanca or Santiago de Compostela universities. Jeroen Nilis in his book "Irish Students at Leuven University, 1548-1797. A Prosopography, Fasti Academici 4 (Leuven: Acco 2010)" does not list MacGauran except for a note to entry number 56 on page 41. That entry state "Eduardus ? from Waterford diocese in Ireland, matriculated in 1577". The note in the Addenda asks "Is this Edmund Magauran, Archbishop of Armagh?". This is unlikely as he was from Kilmore diocese and is never referred to as Eduardus but Edmundus in all surviving documentation.

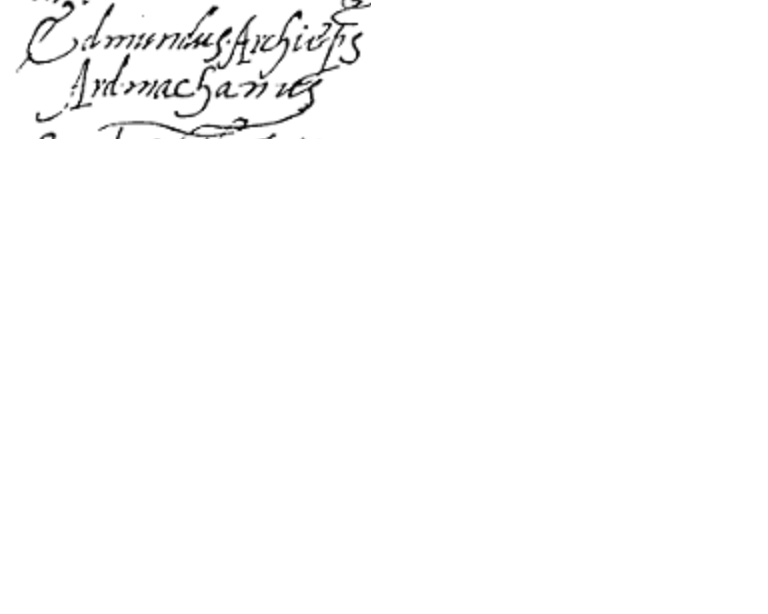
Signature of Edmund MacGauran on a document signed in the Maguire castle at Enniskillen, County Fermanagh on 8 May 1593

He was ordained in Rome c.1576 when Pope Gregory XIII gave him permission as "a scholar of Kilmore Diocese to be ordained to clerical and all holy orders". It is likely that he returned to Ireland and was appointed to a parish in Roman Catholic Diocese of Kilmore, as Tullyhaw was situated therein. The McGovern's parish was Templeport but the priest in 1576 was Fergal Magauran. Edmund MacGauran is described as a Kilmore priest by John Lynch at the time of his appointment to the See of Ardagh in 1581 and in 1586 he still held the rectorial tithes of the parishes of Kinawley and Knockninny in Kilmore diocese which might indicate he had been parish priest of those parishes before his elevation to the episcopacy. The Bishop of Kilmore during the early years of Edmund's priesthood was Hugh O'Sheridan who ruled from 1560 to 1579. The McGovern chief at the time was Brian Óg Mág Samhradháin who died in 1584.

Edmund's priesthood witnessed a decline in the hegemony of both the Catholic Church and the McGovern chiefs in Tullyhaw. Another early mention of Edmund Magauran is in connection with the attempt of James FitzMaurice FitzGerald to invade Ireland from Spain. On 14 April 1577 the President Sir William Drury wrote from Dungarvan to the Secretary of State, Sir Francis Walsingham- "The intelligence from France is worthy of consideration" and he encloses a report dated 19 February 1577 stating- "James Fitzmaurice has gone to the Pope, to get his benediction and aid; after his return he will, with a host of French soldiers under M. De L Roche, M. Daukin and his brother, invade Munster. James will visit the Kings of Spain and Portugal, who will give him of their treasure. David Wolf will be sent to the Indies. The spiritual benefices of Munster are all granted by the Pope to James' men. Letters brought from Wexford to James. Two priests from Rome with letters from James will sail presently for Wexford. The French King to persecute the French Protestants and James Fitzmaurice to invade Ireland simultaneously." Edmund Magauran was probably one of the two priests referred to in the above intelligence of 19 February as he was arrested and interrogated upon landing along with his co-conspirators. A dispatch from Waterford on 10 May 1577 stated- "Examinations of Edmund McGawran, John Wise, Walter White, George Quemerford, Thomas Wise, Dorothy Walshe and Peter Tramlye, relative to the proceedings of James Fitzmaurice and his wife. 4,000 Frenchmen destined for Ireland."

== Bishop of Ardagh ==
Edmund Magauran's value as an emissary from Catholic Europe to the Irish chiefs was recognised by Pope Gregory XIII. who rewarded him with a bishopric. Magauran was praeconised in the Papal Consistory of 2 September 1581 and on 11 September 1581 he was appointed Bishop of Ardagh, a diocese adjacent to Kilmore. The Consistorial Act states- "Die 11 Sept., 1581, referente Senonen. Providit ecc. Ardachaden, in Hib. vac., per trans. Reverendissimus Pater Dominus Richardi ad ecc. Kilmoren., de persona Edmundi Macsaruraghan, ipsumque etc."

Bishop Magauran was neither the first nor last Kilmore priest to hold this bishopric as his immediate predecessor Richard Brady O.F.M., a Franciscan from Cavan, ruled Ardagh from 1576 to 1580 when he was transferred to the See of Kilmore. Furthermore a namesake of Edmund's, Cormac Mác Shamhradháin, the Prior of Drumlane Abbey, was Bishop of Ardagh from 1444 to 1476, while another namesake James Magauran was parish priest of Oughteragh in Kilmore diocese before he ruled as Bishop of Ardagh from 1815 to 1829.

As Edmund Magauran was only aged about 34 at the time of his appointment, he must have been highly regarded by his superiors. Pope Gregory XIII later proved this by entrusting Bishop Magauran with a special mission to the Ulster Gaelic chiefs, when he was to attempt to obtain their support for the Geraldine war or Desmond Rebellions (1579–83), which was then raging in Munster. It is regarded as the first Counter-Reformation military crusade in Ireland.

Following the reduction of Desmond, MacGauran was exiled from Ireland in 1585 by Queen Elizabeth I of England and he went first to Scotland with some trusty servants. In the summer of 1585 Magauran travelled around Scotland and claimed to have confirmed upwards of 10,000 Scottish Catholics. The English government was afraid Magauran was trying to start a joint uprising in both Scotland and Ireland to overthrow the Protestant religion, so at the request of Queen Elizabeth, the Scottish government issued orders for his arrest but he evaded them by boarding a ship bound for France in September 1585. On the way the ship was captured by Sir Francis Drake on 7 September 1585 and taken to London. However Magauran and his companions were concealed in a hideout in the bottom of the ship and escaped detection when it was searched. The bishop then boarded another ship for France which was attacked by pirates. However they escaped and landed in France where they made their way to Paris, arriving shortly before 30 September 1585.

Father James Tyrie, a Jesuit priest in Paris, wrote a letter to Fr. Claudio Acquaviva, the Superior-General of the Jesuits in Rome on 31 September, stating-

"We have had a visit from an Irish Bishop, who has been some time in Scotland, and with Fathers Hay and Gordon. He was entrusted by them with letters, which he eventually threw into the sea when in peril from enemies. From letters by Robert Bruce and others, I extract these particulars. Fathers Hay and Gordon are in the North of Scotland with the Earl of Huntly; Fathers Holt and Dury are in the West with the Earl of Morton i.e., Lord Maxwell at Dumfries. The number of Catholics increases rapidly every day, and the Irish Bishop assures me that during the short time he remained in Scotland, he administered the sacrament of confirmation to at least ten thousand persons."

Corroboration of this event is provided by a later report in the same year which suggested that the same number of souls had been reconciled to Catholicism in the previous six months. Bishop Magauran then left France for Spain. The Lord Deputy, Sir John Perrot writing from Dublin on 12 January 1586 to Sir Francis Walsingham, stated-

"Sir Cuconnaught Maguire is at this present with me here, and telleth me that the Pope's bishop of Ardagh, maintained by O'Rourke, went this last summer to Scotland, and thence to France and thence to Spain, did assure him that Spaniards would land this Spring, either in the west or in the north or in both places, but he durst not deliver this matter to any other but to myself. It was that bishop which Brian McGeoghegan told Captain Nicholas Dawtrey of."

In 1586 Magauran left Spain for Rome. On entering Italy he first went on a pilgrimage to the Marian Shrine at Loreto, Marche on foot to fulfill a double vow he made when saved from capture at sea. Loreto is a hilltown and comune of the Italian province of Ancona, in the Marche. It is mostly famous as the seat of the Basilica della Santa Casa, a popular Catholic pilgrimage site and it was the foremost Marian Shrine in Europe at that time. The reason Bishop Magauran gave for this pilgrimage to Loreto was that his escape from Drake's search happened on the eve of the birthday of the Blessed Virgin Mary, who had warned one of his companions in a dream. Magauran spent three days at Loreto and left the above account of his adventures in the shrine. He reached Rome before 25 April 1586 as on that date we find him acting as one of the principal co-consecrators of Maol Muire Ó hÚigínn, the new Archbishop of Tuam. Following this visit to Rome he returned to Spain to continue his efforts to extract help with the Counter-Reformation movement in Ireland from King Philip II of Spain. The King selected Magauran to perform the consecration ceremony for the new basilica at El Escorial on 10 August 1586 so he must have been held in high regard. In Spain he associated with the Geraldine exiles from Lisbon such as Maurice Fitzgerald, Edmund Eustace, Charles O'Conor-Faly, and Bishop Cornelius O'Mulrian of Killaloe.

== Archbishop of Armagh ==
At this time the Archbishop of Armagh Richard Creagh was in prison in the Tower of London and died there in December 1586. Father Creighton, who attended Primate Creagh at his death, was in Paris towards the end of May 1587, and headed for Rome on 1 June 1587 where he conveyed the details of the Primate's death to the Holy See. During Archbishop Creagh's imprisonment, Redmond O'Gallagher, Bishop of Derry, was Vice-Primate of Ireland from 1575 to 1 July 1587 and probably expected to succeed. However Bishop Magauran was on the spot in Rome and although still a young man of about 39, he seemed an ideal candidate to lead the Counter-Reformation in Ireland, in part because of his efforts in the Desmond Rebellion and also because of his leadership of the Irish exiles in Scotland and Spain. In any event on 1 July 1587 MacGauran was translated from Ardagh to the archbishopric of Armagh in succession to Archbishop Creagh.

On 7 August 1587, both MacGauran and his friend Juan de Sanclemente Torquemada, who had been appointed the new archbishop of the Roman Catholic Archdiocese of Santiago de Compostela in Spain on 27 July 1587, received the pallium in Rome from Pope Sixtus V. They had requested the pallium through the same Spanish proxy and after the consistory they travelled together to Spain.

The Consistorial Acts state – (1)

"Die 1 Julii, 1587, R. Card. Senon. Proposuit. Armacanam ecclesiam in Hybernia, vacantem per obitum R. D. Richardi Creaghii, ultimi illius archiepiscopi, anno preterite in carceribus Angliae defuncti, ubi per 20 annos detentus fuerat, et providendam de persona Reverendissimus Pater Dominus Edmundi, Episcopi Ardacadensis. Retulit imprimis predictam ecclesiam Metropolitanam esse totius regni, suffraganeos 10 habentem, omnesque principes et populos dictae provincial Catholicos esse et sitam in civitate Armacana, sub S. Patritii invocatione, rebus pro cultu divino requisilis sufficienter ornatam, cum Dignitatibus et Canonicatibus, et in ea ritu Catholico celebrari affirmavit. Deinde subjunxit diocesim illam ad miliaria in longitudine 40, in latitudine vero ad 30 se extendere, fructus autem ad florenos 1,500 ascendere et ita in libris Cameras taxari. Demum R. D. Edmundum transferendum, nobilem Hybernum, Belmeren (sic) diocesis, de legitime matrimonio procreatum, aetatis annorum 40, et virum denique idoneum dixit regimini dictae Metropolitanae ecclesiae, et eius instaurationi, et gratum Episcopis ac Principibus ejusdem provincise, a quibus ad hanc S. Sedem mossus est, et eundem fidei professionem emisisse, et processum formatum, et a Rmis. ordinum Capitibus subscriptum supra praedictis asseverasset. Supplicavit pro expeditione gratis, attenta prsesentis ecclesiae devastatione et juxta morem sic pro Hybernis expediendi. Quamobrem obtenuit ut petiit. Bologna". (2) "July 1, 1587. Refte. R. Senonen, S. D. N. absolvit R. P. D. Edmundum Episcopum Ardacaden. a vinculo quo tenebatur ecclesiae Ardacaden., et eum transtulit ad Metrop. Armachanam vac. per obitum Richardi; ipsumque etc." Barberini". (3) "Die 7 Augusti, 1587, archiepiscopo Armacano in Hybernia, presenti et petenti. Pallium fuit datum. Bologna."

One of Magauran's first acts as archbishop was to become one of the principal co-consecrators of Tadeo O'Farrell, the new Bishop of Clonfert on 30 August 1587.

In 1588 Magauran travelled to Lisbon in Portugal. He was there on 25 January 1588 and had brought with him a part of the skull of St. Brigit of Kildare. He presented this relic in a beautiful reliquary to the Church of Igreja de São Roque, the principal church of the Jesuits in Lisbon. A contemporary account stated- "The feast of San Roque was celebrated this year with the accustomed solemnity of a solemn Pontifical Mass to hear the Irish bishop officiate. The best singers in the city were there and assisted by several musicians. Father Jeronimo Dias preached and was heard by the secular nobles and men of quality, as well as various religious orders, many of whom ate that day in our dining hall with three bishops present."

The plans to invade Ireland were well under way and in early 1589 Magauran travelled to Brussels and tried to enlist the help of the Irish officers in the Spanish army in Flanders. This came to the notice of the English authorities in Ireland. Sir William Fitzwilliam (Lord Deputy) wrote from Dublin Castle on 14 March 1589 to Sir William Cecil, 1st Baron Burghley, the Lord Treasurer of England, enclosing "Reports touching the King of Spain's new preparations for invasion", one of which he had received from Sir Henry Duke, the High-Sheriff of County Cavan, which stated- "The arrival of one called Ferres O'Hooin, son to the Cooharbe O'Hooin of Fermanagh. He is the secret messenger of Bishop Magawran and Cahil O'Conor, whom he left in Flanders with the Prince, labouring for forces to come into Ireland. He is in Maguire's country, and intends to return to Spain." On 7 May 1589 he was granted a passport to go from Brussels to Spain.

In the winter of 1590 Edmund asked Fr. Claudio Acquaviva, the Superior-General of the Jesuits, for the services of James Archer and another Jesuit to reopen the Jesuit mission in Ireland. Acquaviva hesitated because he wanted more information before he could authorise a new Jesuit mission in Ireland.

On 22 January 1591 Acquaviva denied the archbishop's request. In his eagerness to restore Catholicism as the official religion in Ireland, Archbishop MacGauran travelled to Spain and Portugal, seeking financial and military assistance for another uprising. Perhaps Acquaviva's fear that the Society of Jesus would become involved in such military matters was a reason for rejecting the archbishop's request. On 28 June 1591 Magauran was in Madrid where he wrote the following letter (in Gaelic, which is translated here) to a Mr. Mody asking him to convey a message to Captain Oliver Eustace who was with the Spanish Army in Brussels-

"Edmund Magawran, Primate of Armagh, to Capt. Oliver Eustace, Yrlandes, Brussels. Commendations to Capt. Eustace and tell him that I am very thankful for such business as he hath written to me, and albeit much hindrances have happened to him and to many others of our country by means of Englishmen, yet I hope in God it will not be long before they be free from the said nation. And notwithstanding that the Catholic king and his captains be slow in their affairs, I am certain that the men who are proposed to be sent to comfort the same poor island, which is in distress a long time, will not be slow. I ought not to write much to you touching those causes, for I know that a Spaniard shall be chief governor of the whole army. The Irish regiment is written for, and whether they come or not, come you in any wise at all haste. The good Bishop of Ross is dead at Lysborne. The Bishop of Limerick, Edmond Eustace, Morish McShane, Thomas McShane and John Lacy and his kinsmen hath them commended unto you and to the other Irishmen that are there. No more, but stay not for any business and come to overtake us. Madryd 28 June 1591."

The Reverend Bernard O'Donnell stated that he saw the Archbishop in Spain in 1591 and was induced by him to study for the priesthood.

On 5 January 1592 the Irish State Papers list "Edmund Magawran, Primate of Armagh", among the Irish leaders who were plotting with Spain. On Pentecost Sunday 14 May 1592 Archbishop Magauran presided over a sung mass at the solemn inauguration of St. Patrick's Church at the Irish College at Salamanca. On 26 May 1592 MacGauran was in Lisbon according to John Howlin- "The Lord Primat is here and sought to goe to his contry, but seeing Oroke which was his chiefe frend, is executed in London and that there be sherifes in all his contry appointed by the Lord Deputy, his mother and sisters sported and leaft beare naked. I see not howe his Lordship may goe into Ireland". Brian O'Rourke was Magauran's chief ally in Ireland at the time so when news of his execution on 3 November 1591 reached Magauran, he delayed his return to Ireland until autumn 1592.

Magauran held a meeting in early September 1592 at Burgos with King Philip II of Spain, at which meeting the King promised to send Spanish troops to Ireland in the following summer. In the meantime the King arranged and financed Magauran for a trip back to Ireland to prepare the native Irish leaders for the invasion. On 12 September 1592 King Philip wrote from Burgos to Diego de Orellana de Chaves, regarding "Edmund Macgauran, the Catholic Archbishop Armaugh of Ireland who is returning to his own country – Orellana is to arrange passage for him and be certain that he has enough money to travel, and to advise the king if the Archbishop should choose to sail from Bilbao instead of Laredo". Magauran choose Bilbao, as the Purveyor of Bilbao, Baltasar de Laçama, reported to the King on the measures taken to facilitate Magauran's journey, with a list of the supplies he was to take. The Archbishop departed from Bilbao in early October 1592 with two servants. On the way the ship was attacked by pirates but Magauran escaped by dressing as a sailor and reached Drogheda in December 1592 aboard the ship of a local merchant, James Fleming. He stayed there at the house of Walter Brady, a Cavan merchant, for a couple of days and then headed for Tyrconnell. At Christmas 1592 he held a conference of seven northern bishops in the Franciscan friary in Donegal. This meeting proposed the formation of a Catholic confederacy or league among the nobility and clergy of Ulster and Connaught under the leadership of Tyrconnell.

In January 1593 Magauran had travelled on to Fermanagh where he stayed with Hugh Maguire. Sir George Bingham wrote to his brother Richard from Ballymote on 3 January 1593 as follows-

"James O'Crean came lately out of the north from Hugh Roe O'Donnell, where as he saith, he saw seven bishops. Some of them he named unto me. But the chiefest among them was the Bishop M'Gawran, whom the Pope hath made Lord Primate of all Ireland. They were in great Council for two or three days together, and have some great despatch of certain letters, which shall be sent out of hand (as James O'Crean saith) by Bishop O'Hely to the Pope and the King of Spain. He further learned by the Primate M'Gawran that the King of Spain came into France by Waggon and brought his daughter with him to be married to the Duke of Guise. The Primate himself came in his company, and that the King determined to send two armies this next summer, the one for England, the other for Ireland, and the army that should come for Ireland should come by Scotland and land in the north, but their only want was to have some great man here to be (as it were) their leader or general, and have now thought Hugh Roe O'Donnell to be 'the most fittest' for the same. The Primate himself landed at Drogheda, and staid there two or three days after his landing. All which I have thought good to signify unto you, that you may advertise the Lord Deputy thereof. And if it be his pleasure to lay privy at Drogheda, no doubt the Bishop O'Hely may be apprehended, and with him all their practises will be found out. This Bishop M'Gawran is now in Maguire's country and is most relieved there".

More meetings were held with the local chiefs and on 4 April 1593, Archbishop Magauran wrote to King Philip's councillor in charge of British matters, Juan de Idiáquez y Olazábal, to inform him that all the Gaelic lords promised to support a Spanish invasion, amongst whom were O'Donnell, the Bourkes and O'Rourke. On 7 April Hugh Roe O'Donnell followed up with another letter to King Philip confirming it was a good idea to invade as it would cost little and would divert the English from Spanish Flanders.

On 11 April 1593, Patrick M'Arte Moyle M'Mahon gave evidence at Monaghan "of the assemblies sworn by M'Gawran, the titular Primate, to help the Spaniards, who would arrive before mid-May, 1593". A further letter dated 8 May from Enniskillen Castle requested an army of up to 10,000 men by 8 September and was signed by Edmund Magauran, Hugh Maguire, Brian Ogge O'Rourke, six northern bishops and others. All the aforesaid letters from the Irish leaders were entrusted to the Archbishop of Tuam Seamus Ó hÉilidhe but he did not arrive in Spain until September 1593.

In the meantime, trouble started in Fermanagh when the English appointed a sheriff there in May 1593. Hugh Maguire threw the sheriff out of Fermanagh and about 1 June 1593 held a council with the other Northern chiefs. On 19 June 1593, Moris O'Skanlon upon examination declared-"that about Thursday was seven night" [7 June 1593],

"Sir Hugh Maguire, Cormock M'Barron Henry Oge, Alexander M'Donnell Oge, Shane Evarry, brother to Maguire, and the supposed Primate called Edmond M'Gawran, met upon a hill in Slight Art's country [Part of Sir Turlough O'Neill's country bounding upon Fermanagh], where the said Edmond held a book, whereupon the said parties took their oath; but what it was this examinate knoweth not, but by hearsay, for that he stood sixty yards off, and as he heard it was that they should faithfully join together in all their doings and actions. The cause of his knowledge is that he was then present and saw every of them take the book from the pretended Primate and put it towards their heads, and heard the report as before; and for a further testimony he saith, that he sent the Seneschal of Monaghan word by his own messenger the same evening that he should be well upon his keeping, for that he feared they would come to prey his country".

Hugh Maguire then went to O'Rourke's aid against Sir George Bingham, the President of Connacht by attacking Ballymote in County Sligo. Sir Richard Bingham wrote to Burghley on 6 June 1593 (forwarded by Sir H. Bagenall). "One M'Gawran who terms himself Primate, doth much mischief riding on his chief horse, with his staff and shirt of mail. Tirone's own foster brothers at the burning of Ballymote". A dispute arose amongst the O'Rourkes and Maguires about the division of the spoils from Ballymote and Archbishop Magauran tried to settle it. He wrote to Hugh Oge O'Rourke in Gaelic, which was translated into English as follows –

"Magawran, the titular primate of Armagh, hath him commended unto you, Hugh Oge O'Rourke. These are to let you to understand that Maguire appointed me to make as good agreements between you and Brian Oge O'Rourke as possibly I may, which if it may not be effected, to signify unto him which of you hinders it. Therefore I request you to meet a Saturday in some convenient place of appointment, and I with certain gentlemen of Maguires, as Shane M'Hughe's and Brian M'Hughe's children, will meet you. But I request you not to come with any train, and yet not to fail, if ever you will have my favour, to meet for this agreement".

On 13 June 1593, Thadie Nolan, one of Her Majesty's pursuivants declared at Dundalk that-"The Earl of Tirone's great hatred to Marshal Bagenall. Assistance to Maguire. The O'Hagans who killed Phelim M'Tirlough are conversant with the Earl of Tirone. 180 Scots landed. M'Sweeny Ne Doe doth join Maguire with 400 galloglas. The North standeth altogether at the pleasure of the Earl and the pretended Primate Magawran".

On 15 June 1593, the Lord Deputy and Council were in Dundalk where they examined the aforesaid Patrick M'Arte Moyle M'Mahon who informed them that- "Bishop M'Gawran's promise of forces out of Spain. The messages sent to him by Henry Oge O'Neill not to expose himself to danger." On 18 June 1593, Marshall Bagenall stated that he was informed- "The Earl of Tirone's command for wasting the barony of Cremorne. Confederacy between O'Donnell, Maguire, the titular Primate M'Gawran, and the Earl of Tirone." On 20 June 1593, William Moate declared at Dundalk-"that the Earl of Tirone, O'Donnell, Maguire, and Primate Magawran, received the sacrament together at Strabane". On 25 June 1593, Sir Morish O'Cullen, the Chancellor of Armagh, stated at Dundalk that- "Thurlough O'Boile has got the treasurership of Armagh from the Primate M'Gawran."

== Battle of Sciath na Feart / Death ==
On 23 June (New Style 3 July) 1593 (The Vigil of St. John or Bonfire Night), Archbishop Edmund MacGauran was killed in Skeanavart townland in the Parish of Kilmacumsy, Barony of Frenchpark, County Roscommon, whilst accompanying Hugh Maguire on his raid into Connacht.

The Annals of the Four Masters state-

"A hosting was made by Maguire (Hugh, the son of Cuconnaught), to emulate that excursion of Brian O'Rourke. He proceeded first through the eastern part of Breifny, keeping Lough Allen to the left; then through the upper part of Tirerrill, through Corran, and across the bridge at the monastery of Boyle, into Machaire Connacht. Early in the day he dispatched marauding parties through the country around. This night the Governor, Sir Richard Bingham, happened to be on a hill near the gate of Tulsk, in the barony of Roscommon, watching the surrounding country; and a party of his cavalry went forth to scour the hills around the hill on which he was [stationed]; but they noticed nothing, in consequence of a thick fog of the early morning, until they and Maguire's cavalry met face to face. The Governor's cavalry turned their backs to them, and they were hotly pursued by Maguire and his people, who continued to lash and strike them until they arrived at the camp and fortification where the Governor was. They again turned upon Maguire, and pursued him back by the same road, until he had reached the middle of his forces. When the Governor saw that he had not an equal number of men with them, he returned back, he himself and all his people having escaped scathless from that conflict, except only William Clifford, a distinguished gentleman, and five or six horsemen, who were slain on that occasion. On the other side were slain, Edmond Magauran, Primate of Armagh, who happened accidentally to be along with Maguire on this occasion; the Abbot Maguire, (Cathal, son of the Abbot); Mac Caffry (Felim), and his brother's son. These were slain on the third day of July. Maguire was not pursued any more on that day; and, having carried away the preys and great spoils of that country, he proceeded steadily and slowly, from one encampment to another, to Fermanagh."

Philip O'Sullivan Beare stated that-

"About this time Edmund MacGauran, Primate of Ireland, Archbishop of Armagh, was conveyed from Spain by James Fleming, a merchant of Drogheda, bearing a message to the Irish from the King of Spain, to declare war on the Protestants in defence of the Catholic Faith, and informing them that he would very speedily send them aid. The Primate going to Maguire who was already at war and a man of warlike propensities, had no difficulty in persuading him to continue the struggle on the faith of his Catholic Majesty's assurances, and reliance on his sending assistance. Maguire with the Primate and slender forces crossed O'Rourke's country of Breifny and again attacked Connaught. On hearing this, Richard Bingham, an English Knight, Governor of Connaught, sent against him William Gilbert, an Englishman with a small force. They met at a place anciently called 'The Shield of Miracles' (Skieth na Bhfeart). The cavalry of both parties preceded the foot battalions, covering the wings. The day was very dark owing to a thick mist, so that they did not see one another until they came face to face. The trumpet suddenly giving the command, precipitated both into battle. Maguire, who never in the least lost his presence of mind, ran Gilbert through with a spear, killed him, and routed and put his cavalry to flight. The foot closely followed Maguire. The Primate was mounted on horseback and accompanied by only two gentlemen—Felim MacCaffrey and Cathal Maguire. While Maguire was fighting Gilbert, another troop of royalist cavalry fell upon the Primate, who, as he was flying fell from his horse and was killed as he lay on the ground. Felim was also slain fighting. Some foot-soldiers of the Catholic army recognising the Primate's voice, although they could not see him on account of the thick mist, rushed up and thinking Cathal who with drawn sword was defending the Primate, was one of the Protestants, they killed him with many wounds, while the Protestants escaped unhurt, owing to the fleetness of their horses. Maguire was more grieved at the Primate's death than rejoiced at the victory, and laden with booty returned home. Subsequently O'Rourke and Maguire resolving to punish, not only the English Protestants, but also those Irish Catholics who aided them, laid waste O'Ferrall's country of Annaly in Meath. William O'Ferrall tried to rescue the spoils in a cavalry fight, but at the very first charge Maguire put an end to the combat, having by his dexterity and valour pierced William with a spear. On his death the others offered no further resistance, and O'Rourke and Maguire retained the booty".

On 28 June 1593 Sir Richard Bingham wrote to Burghley stating – "the killing of the arch-traitor M'Gawran, a venomous person, who hath chiefly contrived all these mischief". Bingham's fuller report to the Privy Council on the same date states-

"M'Guire was on horseback; and all their principal men and himself escaped so narrowly, and the very next unto him, round about him, were stricken down; amongst whom his ghostly father, the Titulary Primate Mac Gauran, lost his life, a man of more worth in respect of the villany and combinations which he hath wrought with the ill Irishry than the overthrow of divers hundreds of the other Beggars; and so generally is his death lamented as if the same were their utter overthrow. And, assuredly (right honorable), he was the only stirrer and combiner of their mischiefs towards in Ulster (and the primer of M'Guire to come forward in their two journeys, making the Irishry full of belief that they should have the aid this summer of Spaniards) and another champion of the Pope's, like Doctor Allen, the notable traitor; but, God be thanked, he hath left his dead carcase on the Maugherie, only the said Rebels carried his head away with them, that they might universally bemoan him at home".

And again, on 30 June, the Lord Deputy and Council informed the Privy Council- "the traitorous titulary Bishop Magawran, with seven or eight of the Maguires, slain in the Maghery."

The list of those slain on the side of Maguire is given "Names of the principal men slain by Sir R. Bingham, on Midsummer Eve, in the encounter with Maguire. The Primate Magawran, the Abbot Magwire, M'Elan the chief leader of the Scots, M'Caffry, chief of his name, Turlough M'Caffrey's two sons, M'Thomas, M'Turlough Moile Magwire, son to the Lord of Clancally, James M'Turlough M'Philip Magwire, Cuconnought M'Hugh Magwire's son, and Con M'Turlough O'Neill."

The Archbishop's corpse would probably have been buried in the adjoining graveyard of Caldragh. There is a local tradition that the Archbishop's head was buried by the O'Rourkes in the Cemetery of Kiltoghert, County Leitrim, where a stone sculpture of a mitred head still marks the spot. The sculpture was a keystone removed from the 14th century church nearby and placed on a headstone, which states a Bishop Mac Raith ua Móráin (died 1168) was buried there, which was probably the reason Archbishop MacGauran was buried in the same plot. There are many mentions of the McGovern clan in the various Irish Annals throughout the ages and it is perhaps fitting that the very last such mention is of the death of their most illustrious son, Edmund MacGauran, Archbishop of Armagh, Primate of All Ireland, confidante of Emperors and Popes.
