= Fargal O'Reilly =

Irish Roman Catholic prelate

- Bishop of Kilmore
- Church: Catholic Church
- Diocese: Diocese of Kilmore
- In office: 16 January 1807 – 30 April 1829
- Predecessor: James Dillon
- Successor: James Browne

Orders
- Consecration: 24 August 1807 by Richard O'Reilly

Personal details
- Born: 1741 Bailieborough, County Cavan, Kingdom of Ireland, British Empire
- Died: 30 April 1829 (aged 79–80)

Styles of Fargal O'Reilly
- Reference style: The Most Reverend
- Spoken style: My Lord
- Religious style: Bishop

Fargal O'Reilly (or Farrell O'Reilly; died 1829) was an Irish Roman Catholic prelate who served as the Bishop of Kilmore from 1807 to 1829.

A native of the parish of Bailieborough in County Cavan, Ireland, he was the parish priest of Drumlane from 1790 to 1807. He was elected Bishop of the Diocese of Kilmore by the Sacred Congregation for the Propagation of the Faith on 4 October 1806 and was confirmed by Pope Pius VII on 14 December 1806. O'Reilly's papal brief to the See of Kilmore was dated 16 January 1807 and was consecrated on 24 August 1807 by the Most Reverend Richard O'Reilly, Archbishop of Armagh.

He died in office on 30 April 1829, and was buried in the graveyard at Moybolgue, near Bailieborough.

== Notes ==
Catholic Church titles
Preceded by James Dillon	Bishop of Kilmore; 1807–1829	Succeeded by James Browne
