= Bishop of Kilmore =

Irish Episcopalian title

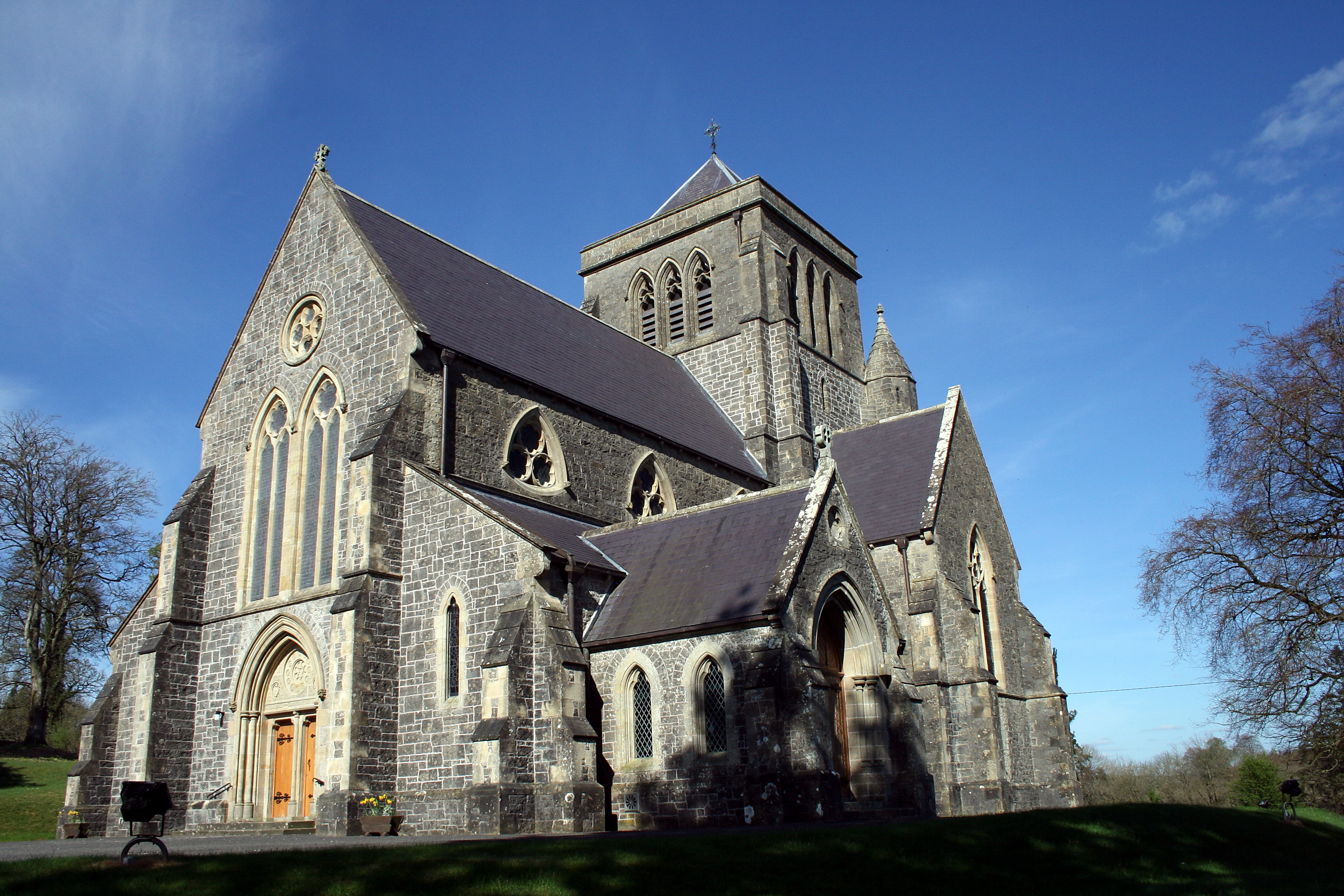
The Cathedral Church of Saint Fethlimidh, Kilmore, the episcopal seat of the Church of Ireland bishops. Within the grounds lies the pre-Reformation Cathedral, now used as a parochial hall.

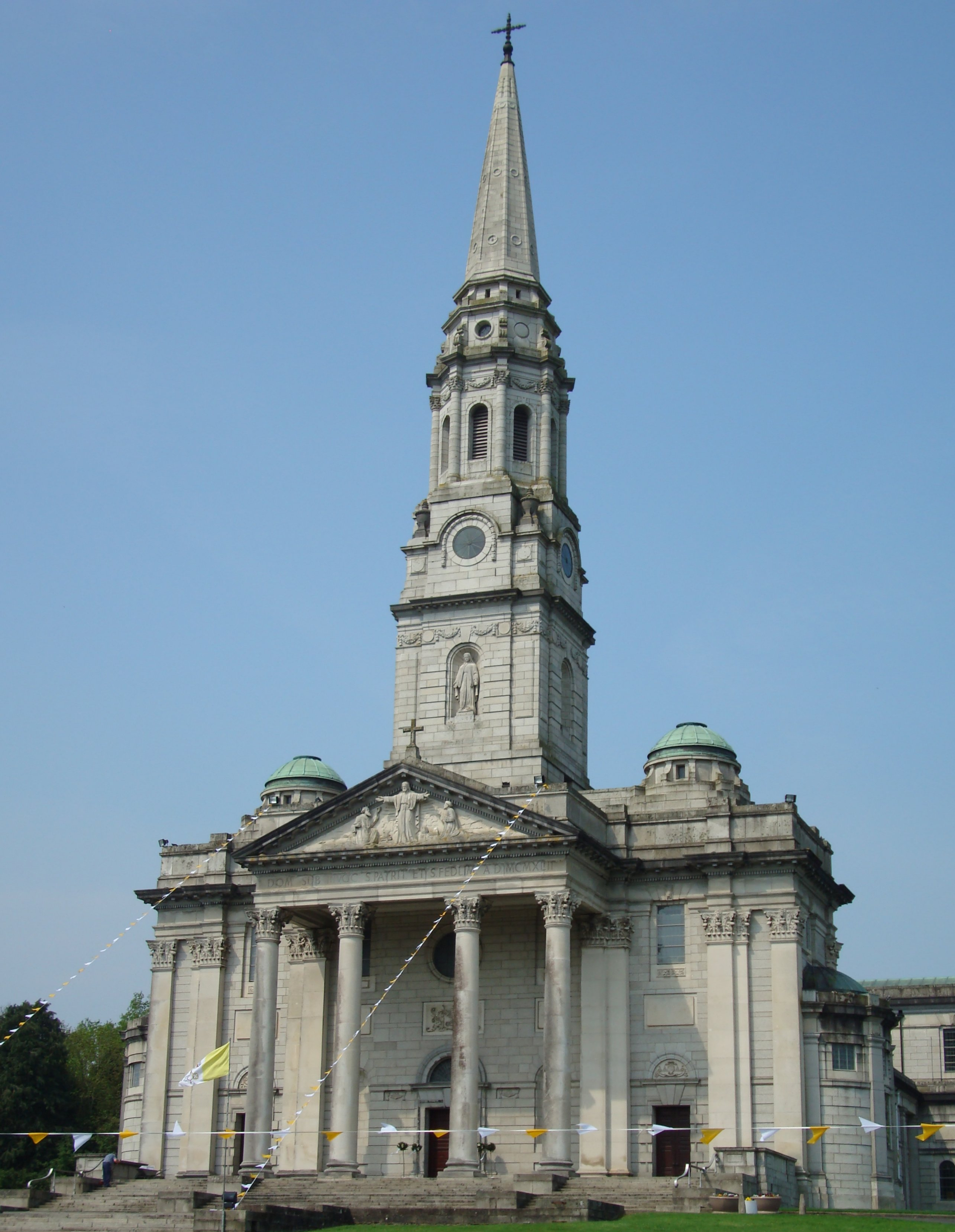
The Cathedral of Saints Patrick and Felim, Cavan Town, the episcopal seat of the Post-Reformation Roman Catholic bishops.

The Bishop of Kilmore is an episcopal title which takes its name after the parish of Kilmore, County Cavan in Ireland. In the Roman Catholic Church it remains a separate title, but in the Church of Ireland it has been united with other bishoprics.

== History ==
The see of Kilmore was originally known as Breifne (Latin: Tirbrunensis, Tybruinensis or Triburnia; Irish: Tír mBriúin, meaning "the land of the descendants of Brian", one of the kings of Connaught) and took its name after the Kingdom of Breifne.

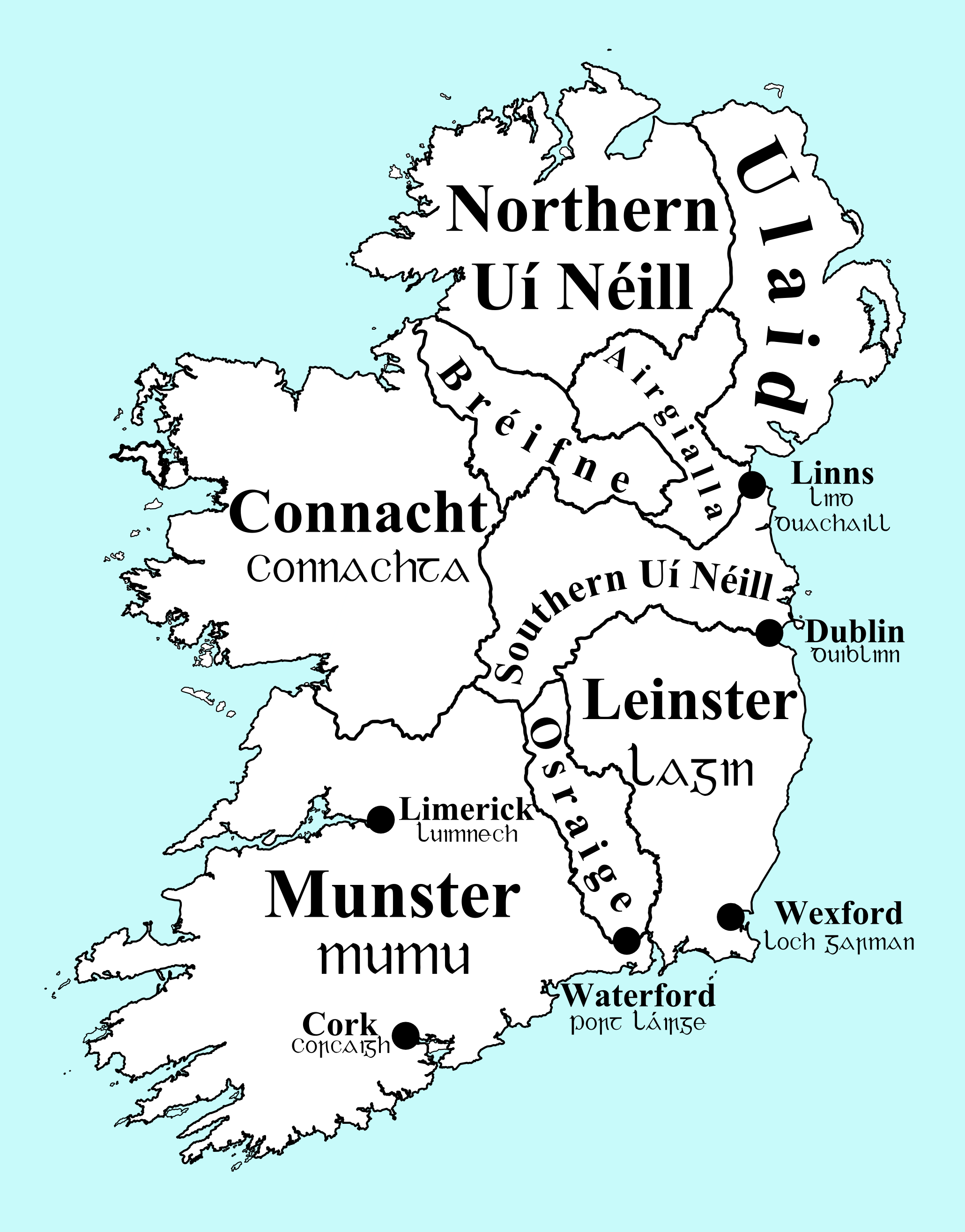
The overkingdoms of Ireland circa 900, including the Kingdom of Breifne which has approximately the same boundaries with the diocese of Kilmore.

The see became one of the dioceses approved by Giovanni Cardinal Paparoni at the synod of Kells in 1152, and has approximately the same boundaries as those of the ancient Kingdom of Breifne. In the Irish annals, the bishops were recorded of Breifne, Breifni, Breifny, Tir-Briuin, or Ui-Briuin-Breifne.

In the second half of the 12th century, it is likely the sees of Breifne and Kells were ruled together under one bishop. In 1172, Tuathal Ua Connachtaig took the oath of fealty to King Henry II of England as bishop of Kells. Soon after 1211 the see of Kells was incorporated into the diocese of Meath.

In 1454, Pope Nicholas V gave permission for the then bishop, Aindrias Mac Brádaigh (Anglicised: Andrew McBrady), to have the ancient church at Kilmore, founded in the 6th century by Saint Felim (or Feithlimidh), to be the cathedral church of the diocese. This building passed into the hands of the Church of Ireland at the Reformation, and, following the construction of a new cathedral, is now used as a parochial hall.

After the upheavals of the Reformation, there were parallel apostolic successions: one of the Church of Ireland and the other of the Roman Catholic Church.

In the Church of Ireland, the title was intermittently held with Ardagh until they were finally united in 1839. In 1841, the sees of Kilmore and Ardagh were amalgamated with Elphin to form the united bishopric of Kilmore, Elphin and Ardagh. The current incumbent is The Right Reverend Samuel Ferran Glenfield M.A. M.Th. (Oxon.) M.Litt. He was elected, consecrated, and installed in 2013.

In the Roman Catholic, the title continues as a separate bishopric. The current Bishop of the Roman Catholic Diocese of Kilmore is the Most Reverend Martin Hayes, who was appointed as the diocesan bishop on 29 June and installed at the Cathedral Church of Saints Patrick and Felim, Cavan on 20 September 2020.

== Pre-Reformation bishops ==
Bishops of Breifne
From	Until	Ordinary	Notes
unknown	1136	Áed Ua Finn	Anglicised as Hugh O'Finn. Died in office on an island in Lough Ree.
unknown	1149	Muirchertach Ua Máel Mochéirge	Died in office.
before 1152	1179	Tuathal Ua Connachtaig	Known in Latin as Thaddaeus. Present at the Synod of Kells in March 1152. Took the oath of fealty to Henry II in 1172 as bishop of Kells. Died in office.
before 1185	c. 1185	(Name not known) ^{[A]}	A Cistercian monk. Elected and consecrated before 1185. Expelled circa 1185.
1202	1211	M. Ua Dobailén ^{[A]}	Became bishop before August 1202. Died in office.
unknown	1231	Flann Ó Connachtaig	Known in Latin as Florentius. Died in office.
c. 1233	1250	Congalach Mac Idneóil	Resigned before May 1250. Died in office in 1250.
1251	1285	Simon Ó Ruairc	Anglicised as Simon O'Rourke. Elected before 20 June 1251. Died in office.
1286	1307	Mauricius, O.S.A.	Elected before October 1286. Died in office.
unknown	1314	Matha Mac Duibne	Anglicised as Matthew MacGevney. Died in office.
before 1320	1328	Pádraic Ó Cridecáin	Anglicised as Patrick O'Cridagain. Elected before 1320. Died in office.
unknown	1355	Conchobhar Mac Conshnámha	Also known as Cornelius Ford. Died in office.
c. 1356	1369	Riocard Ó Raghillaigh	Anglicised as Richard O'Reilly. Elected circa 1356. Died in office.
before 1373	c. 1389	Johannes	Elected before 1373. Died in office.
c. 1388	? 1390	Thomas Rushook, O.P.	Translated from Chichester circa 1388. Possibly resigned 1390 and died circa 1393.
1389	1393	Seoán Ó Raghillaigh I	Anglicised as John O'Reilly. Became bishop after 2 November 1389. Died in office.
1395	1421	Nicol Mac Brádaigh	Alias Ruaidhrí Mac Brádaigh (anglicised as Nicholas or Rory MacBrady). Appointed before 27 August 1395 and consecrated before July 1398. Died in office.
dates unknown		John Stokes	Date of appointment not known. Acted as a suffragan bishop in the dioceses of Lichfield in 1407, and Worcester in 1416.
c. 1408/09	unknown	David Ó Faircheallaigh	Appointed by Pope Gregory XII and consecrated between 1408 and 1409. Died in office.
1422	c. 1445	Domhnall O Gabhann	Known in Latin as Donatus. Appointed 13 August 1421 and consecrated after 30 June 1422. Resigned circa 1445.
Pre-Reformation Bishops of Kilmore
From	Until	Ordinary	Notes
1445	1455	Aindrias Mac Brádaigh	Anglicised as Andrew McBrady. Appointed on 9 March 1445. Died in office.
1455	1464	Fear Siíhe Mág Dhuibhne, O.S.A.	Appointed on 11 July 1455. Died in office on 27 November 1464.
1465	1476	Seoán Ó Raghillaigh II, O.S.A.	Anglicised as John O'Reilly. Appointed on 17 May 1465. Died in office before November 1476.
1476	1512	Cormac Mág Shamhradháin, O.S.A. ^{[B]}	Anglicised as Cormac McGovern. Appointed on 4 November 1476. Died in office in December 1511.
1480	1511	Tomás Mac Brádaigh ^{[B]}	Anglicised as Thomas MacBrady. Appointed on 20 October 1480. Died in office on 29 July 1511.
1512	1530	Diarmaid Ó Raghillaigh	Anglicised as Dermot O'Reilly. Appointed on 28 January 1512. Died in office before June 1530.

== Bishops during the Reformation ==
During the Reformation, Edmund Nugent and John MacBrady were at one time or another bishops of either the Church of Ireland or Roman Catholic succession. They were each appointed as Roman Catholic bishops, but later accepted or recognized as Anglican bishops.

Bishops of Kilmore during the Reformation
From	Until	Ordinary	Notes
1530	c. 1550	Edmund Nugent, O.S.A.	Last Prior of Tristernagh Abbey. Appointed bishop on 22 January 1530, but continued to hold the abbey in commendam until he surrendered it to King Henry VIII in 1536 and accepted royal supremacy. Deprived of the Roman Catholic see by Pope Paul III in 1540, but continued as the Church of Ireland bishop until his death in circa 1550.
1540	1559	John MacBrady	Appointed by Pope Paul III, in opposition to Edmund Nugent, on 5 November 1540. Presumably recognized by the crown in the reign of Queen Mary I. Died in 1559.

== Post-Reformation bishops ==
=== Church of Ireland succession ===
Church of Ireland Bishops of Kilmore
From	Until	Ordinary	Notes
1559	1585	See vacant	
1585	1589	John Garvey	Nominated on 20 January and appointed by letters patent on 27 January 1585. Translated to Armagh on 10 May 1589.
1589	1603	See vacant	During part of this period, the custody of the see was placed under Edward Edgeworth, Prebendary of Christchurch and St Patrick's cathedrals in Dublin, later Bishop of Down and Connor.
1603	1633	See part of the united bishopric of Kilmore and Ardagh	
1633	1642	William Bedell	Appointed Bishop of Kilmore and Ardagh in 1629. He relinquished the title Bishop of Ardagh in 1633, but continued Bishop of Kilmore until his death on 7 February 1642.
1643	1661	Robert Maxwell	Nominated on 17 November 1642 and consecrated on 24 March 1643. Became Bishop of Kilmore and Ardagh when the two sees were united again in 1661.
1661	1742	See part of the united bishopric of Kilmore and Ardagh	
1742	1757	Joseph Story	Translated from Killaloe. Nominated on 7 January and appointed by letters patent on 29 January 1742. Died in office on 22 September 1727.
1757	1772	John Cradock	Nominated on 14 October and consecrated on 4 December 1757. Translated to Dublin on 5 March 1772.
1772	1774	Denison Cumberland	Translated from Clonfert and Kilmacduagh> Appointed by letters patent on 6 March 1772. Died in office in November 1774 and buried in Kilmore Cathedral churchyard on 22 November 1774.
1775	1790	George Lewis Jones	Nominated on 21 November 1774 and consecrated 22 January 1775. Translated to Kildare on 5 June 1790.
1790	1796	William Foster	Translated from Cork and Ross> Nominated on 7 May and appointed by letters patent on 11 June 1790. Translated to Clogher on 21 January 1796.
1796	1801	The Hon. Charles Brodrick	Translated from Clonfert and Kilmacduagh. Nominated on 28 December 1795 and appointed by letters patent on 19 January 1796. Translated to Cashel on 9 December 1801.
1802	1839	George de la Poer Beresford	Translated from Clonfert and Kilmacduagh. Nominated on 12 January and appointed by letters patent on 1 March 1802. Became Bishop of Kilmore and Ardagh in 1839. Died in office on 15 October 1841.
1839	1841	See part of the united bishopric of Kilmore and Ardagh	
since 1841		See part of the united bishopric of Kilmore, Elphin and Ardagh.	

=== Roman Catholic succession ===
Roman Catholic Bishops of Kilmore
From	Until	Incumbent	Notes
1560	1579	Hugh O'Sheridan	Appointed on 7 February 1560. Died in office.
1580	1607	Richard Brady, O.F.M.	Translated from Ardagh on 14 March 1580. Died in office in September 1607.
1607	1625	See vacant	No record of vicars apostolic appointed.
1625	1628	Hugh O'Reilly	Appointed on 9 June and consecrated in July 1626. Translated to Armagh on 21 August 1628.
1629	1669	Eugene Sweeney	Appointed on 18 September 1629 and consecrated in 1630. Died in office on 18 October 1669.
1669	1677	See vacant	Thomas Fitzsymons had been appointed vicar general of Kilmore in 1666, but deprived of the position in 1677. There had been proposals for him to be appointed vicar apostolic on 16 September 1672 and again on 1 February 1678, but was nothing further came from either proposal.
1678	1689	See administered by Patrick Tyrrell, Bishop of Clogher.	
1689	1711	See vacant	No vicars apostolic or apostolic administrators appointed, and the see was governed by unnamed vicars general.
1711	1728	See administered by Hugh MacMahon, Bishop of Clogher.	
1728	1746	Michael MacDonagh, O.P.	Appointed on 2 December and consecrated on 12 December 1728. Died in office on 26 November 1746.
1747	1753	Laurence Richardson, O.P.	Appointed on 6 February and consecrated on 1 May 1747. Died in office on 29 January 1753.
1753	1769	Andrew Campbell	Appointed on 3 April 1753. Died in office on 1 (or 23?) December 1769.
1770	1798	Denis Maguire, O.F.M.	Translated from Dromore. Appointed on 25 March and papal brief dated 7 April 1770. Died in office on 23 December 1798.
1798	1800	Charles O'Reilly	Appointed coadjutor bishop on 28 April and papal brief dated 17 May 1793. Succeeded diocesan bishop on 23 December 1798. Died in office on 6 March 1800.
1800	1806	James Dillon	Previously Coadjutor bishop of Raphoe (1793–1800). Appointed on 10 August 1800 and papal brief dated 30 August 1800. Died in office at Ballyconnell on 19 August 1806.
1807	1829	Fargal O'Reilly	Also recorded as Farrell O'Reilly. Appointed on 14 December 1806, papal brief dated 16 January 1806, and consecrated on 24 August 1807. Died in office on 30 April 1829.
1819	1826	Patrick Maguire, O.F.M. (coadjutor)	Appointed coadjutor bishop on 6 December 1818 and papal brief dated 12 January 1819. Died without succeeding in 1826.
1829	1865	James Browne	Appointed coadjutor bishop on 20 or 23 March 1827 and consecrated on 10 June 1827. Succeeded diocesan bishop on 30 April 1829. Died in office on 11 April 1865.
1865	1886	Nicholas Conaty	Appointed coadjutor bishop on 27 March 1863 and consecrated on 24 May 1863. Succeeded diocesan bishop on 11 April 1865. Died in office on 17 January 1886.
1886	1887	Bernard Finegan	Appointed on 10 May 1886, papal brief dated 18 May 1886, and consecrated on 13 June 1886. Died in office on 11 November 1887.
1888	1906	Edward MacGennis	Appointed on 3 February 1888, papal brief dated 21 February 1888, and consecrated on 15 April 1888. Died in office on 15 May 1906.
1907	1910	Andrew Boylan, C.SS.R.	Appointed on 1 or 13 March 1907 and consecrated on 19 May 1907. Died in office on 25 March 1910.
1910	1937	Patrick Finegan	Appointed on 4 July 1910 and consecrated on 11 September 1910. Died in office on 25 January 1937.
1937	1949	Patrick Lyons	Appointed on 6 August 1937 and consecrated on 3 October 1937. Died in office on 26 (or 27) April 1949.
1950	1972	Austin Quinn	Appointed on 19 July and consecrated on 10 September 1950. Resigned on 10 October 1972 and died on 24 September 1974.
1972	1998	Francis Joseph MacKiernan	Appointed on 11 October and consecrated on 10 December 1972. Resigned on 16 October 1998 and died on 23 December 2005.
1998	2018	Philip Leo O'Reilly	Appointed coadjutor bishop on 20 November 1996 and consecrated on 2 February 1997. Succeeded diocesan bishop on 16 October and installed on 15 November 1998. Resigned on 31 December 2018.
2020	present	Martin Hayes	Appointed on 29 June and consecrated on 20 September 2020.

== Notes ==
- ^{A} These two are possibly the same individual.
- ^{B} Cormac Mág Shamhradháin and Tomás Mac Brádaigh were rival bishops, and probably supported by rival septs within the diocese. They were present at provincial councils held by Ottaviano Spinelli de Palatio, Archbishop of Armagh, in 1492 and 1495, and were both then recognized as bishops of Kilmore. But Diarmaid Ó Raghillaigh was appointed to the see in 1512 before Cormac's death, though Cormac was still maintaining his rights at that date.

== See also ==
- Bishop of Kilmore, Elphin and Ardagh
- Bishop of Elphin
- Bishop of Ardagh
- Roman Catholic Diocese of Kilmore
- Diocese of Kilmore, Elphin and Ardagh (Church of Ireland)
- List of Anglican diocesan bishops in Britain and Ireland

== Bibliography ==
- Brady, W. Maziere (1876). The Episcopal Succession in England, Scotland and Ireland, A.D. 1400 to 1875. Vol. 1. Rome: Tipografia Della Pace.
- Cotton, Henry (1849). The Province of Ulster. Fasti Ecclesiae Hiberniae: The Succession of the Prelates and Members of the Cathedral Bodies of Ireland. Vol. 3. Dublin: Hodges and Smith.
- Fryde, E. B.; Greenway, D. E.; Porter, S.; Roy, I., eds. (1986). Handbook of British Chronology (3rd, reprinted 2003 ed.). Cambridge: Cambridge University Press. ISBN 0-521-56350-X.
- Moody, T. W.; Martin, F. X.; Byrne, F. J., eds. (1984). Maps, Genealogies, Lists: A Companion to Irish History, Part II. A New History of Ireland. Vol. IX. Oxford: Oxford University Press. ISBN 0-19-821745-5.
