= Patrick Maguire (bishop) =

Irish Roman Catholic bishop

Styles of Patrick Maguire, O.F.M.
- Reference style: The Most Reverend
- Spoken style: My Lord
- Religious style: Bishop

Patrick Maguire, O.F.M. (died 1826) was an Irish Roman Catholic prelate who served as the Coadjutor bishop of Kilmore from 1819 to 1826.

A Franciscan friar, he was appointed Coadjutor bishop of the Diocese of Kilmore by the Sacred Congregation for the Propagation of the Faith on 23 November 1818 and confirmed by Pope Pius VII on 6 December 1818. His papal brief was dated 12 January 1819 and consecrated as Titular bishop of Sozopolis in Pisidia.

He died in 1826 before succeeding as diocesan bishop of Kilmore.
