= Bailieborough Community School =

Community school in Ireland

Bailieboro Community School
- Pobail Scoile Coill an Choillaigh

Location
- Bailieborough, County Cavan; Ireland; 53.9129°N 6.9738°W

Information
- Established: 8 November 1982
- Status: Open
- Principal: Miriam Nugent
- Staff: 55 (Academic); 14 (Admin and support)
- Enrollment: 635 (2019)
- Classrooms: 38
- Nickname: BCS
- Website: bailieborocs.ie

Bailieborough Community School, alternatively spelled as Bailieboro, and commonly referred to as BCS, is a community school located in the town of Bailieborough, County Cavan, Ireland. The school was an amalgamation of two previous schools in the town; Bailieborough Vocation School, colloquially called The Tech; and Lourdesville Secondary School, colloquially referred to as 'The Convent'. The school was built on the site of the existing Lourdesville School, and was opened on the 8 November 1982 by the then Minister for Posts and Telegraphs, John Wilson.

The school has 36 teaching classrooms, a physical education gym, a gaelic football pitch and two car parks. As of 2019, there were over 630 students enrolled in BCS.

== Programs ==
=== Leaving Certificate Vocational Programme ===
Bailieborough Community School offers the Leaving Certificate Vocational Programme (LCVP) to all fifth years who achieve certain qualifications. These qualifications are based on the electives that the student chooses for their Leaving Certificate, along with the three core subjects - Irish, English and Mathematics.

=== Transition Year ===
The school offers a Transition Year (TY) program between third year (end of Junior Cycle) and fifth year (beginning of Leaving Cert). TY students typically undertake more extra-curricular activities such as BT Young Scientist and Technology Exhibition and Young Social Innovators.

=== Sport ===
The most prominent sport that the school takes part in is Gaelic football, with other sports including rugby, basketball, handball, badminton, camogie and cross country running. Physical education is under the stewardship of Johnny Brady, former Cavan footballer who was on the 1997 Ulster Senior Football Championship Final winning team; Damian McIntyre is another member of the teaching staff who plays Gaelic football with Shercock GFC.

=== Music ===
The school has hosted several musicals, including Anne of Green Gables, My Fair Lady and Annie Get Your Gun.

== Facilities and development ==
The school is located on a site between Chapel Road and the Virginia Road of the town. It has a standard Gaelic games pitch and a large sports hall. The school consists of two buildings: the main building, which contains the five "areas", and the E-area building. The school has several science labs, a design and communication graphics lab, two computer rooms, a small library, two woodwork rooms, two metalwork rooms, an oratory, staff and student canteens, two home economic rooms, and offices.

From 2014 to 2017 the school went through a series of upgrades. The first involved the replacement of the school's roof and doors. The second, from 2015 to 2016, involved changes to the school traffic system and parking. A new building, which included improved facilities for students with autism and disability, was then built. During the summer of 2017, new canteen facilities were installed.

== Notable alumni and teaching staff ==
- Leanne Kiernan, professional woman's footballer.
- Michael Router, former Parish Priest for Killann, former Chaplain of BCS and Auxiliary Bishop of the Roman Catholic Archdiocese of Armagh.
- Philip Leo O'Reilly, former Chaplain of BCS and former Bishop of Kilmore.
- Niamh Smyth, Irish Fianna Fáil politician.
