= Hugh O'Sheridan =

Styles of Hugh O'Sheridan
- Reference style: The Most Reverend
- Spoken style: My Lord
- Religious style: Bishop

Hugh O'Sheridan (died 1579) was an Irish prelate of the Roman Catholic Church who served as Bishop of Kilmore from 1560 to 1579.

He was appointed the Bishop of the Diocese of Kilmore by Pope Alexander VII on 7 February 1560.

Bishop O'Sheridan died in office in 1579.

== Notes ==
Catholic Church titles
Preceded by John MacBrady	Bishop of Kilmore; 1560–1579	Succeeded by Richard Brady
