= YSI =

YSI may refer to:

- YouSendIt, an online site providing sending of large files
- Young Social Innovators, a project-based competition for schools in the Republic of Ireland
- YSI Inc., a brand of sensors and software for Xylem, Inc.
- YSi, a silicide composed of yttrium and silicon
- Parry Sound/Frying Pan Island-Sans Souci Water Aerodrome (IATA code: YSI), a Canadian airport
