= Bishop of Kells =

The Bishop of Kells (/ˈkɛlz/; Irish: Ceanannas) was the ordinary of the Pre-Reformation Irish Catholic episcopal see based at Kells, County Meath, Ireland.

It was founded by Saint Columba. Known incumbents include Moel Finian and Tuathal Ua Connachtaig.
