= Laurence Richardson (bishop) =

Irish Roman Catholic prelate

Styles of Laurence Richardson, O.P.
- Reference style: The Most Reverend
- Spoken style: My Lord
- Religious style: Bishop

Laurence Richardson (or Lawrence Richardson; 1701–1753) was an Irish Roman Catholic prelate who served as the Bishop of Kilmore from 1747 to 1753.

== Career ==
A Dominican friar, he was appointed the Bishop of the Diocese of Kilmore by Pope Benedict XIV on 6 February 1747. His episcopal ordination took place in Dublin on 1 May 1747; the principal consecrator was the Most Reverend John Linegar, Archbishop of Dublin.

== Death ==
After a long illness, Bishop Richardson died in Dublin on 29 January 1753, aged 52, and was buried in St James' Cemetery, Dublin.

== Notes ==
Catholic Church titles
| Preceded by Michael MacDonagh | Bishop of Kilmore; 1747–1753 | Succeeded by Andrew Campbell |
