= Cavan Cathedral =

- Cathedral of Saint Patrick and Saint Felim
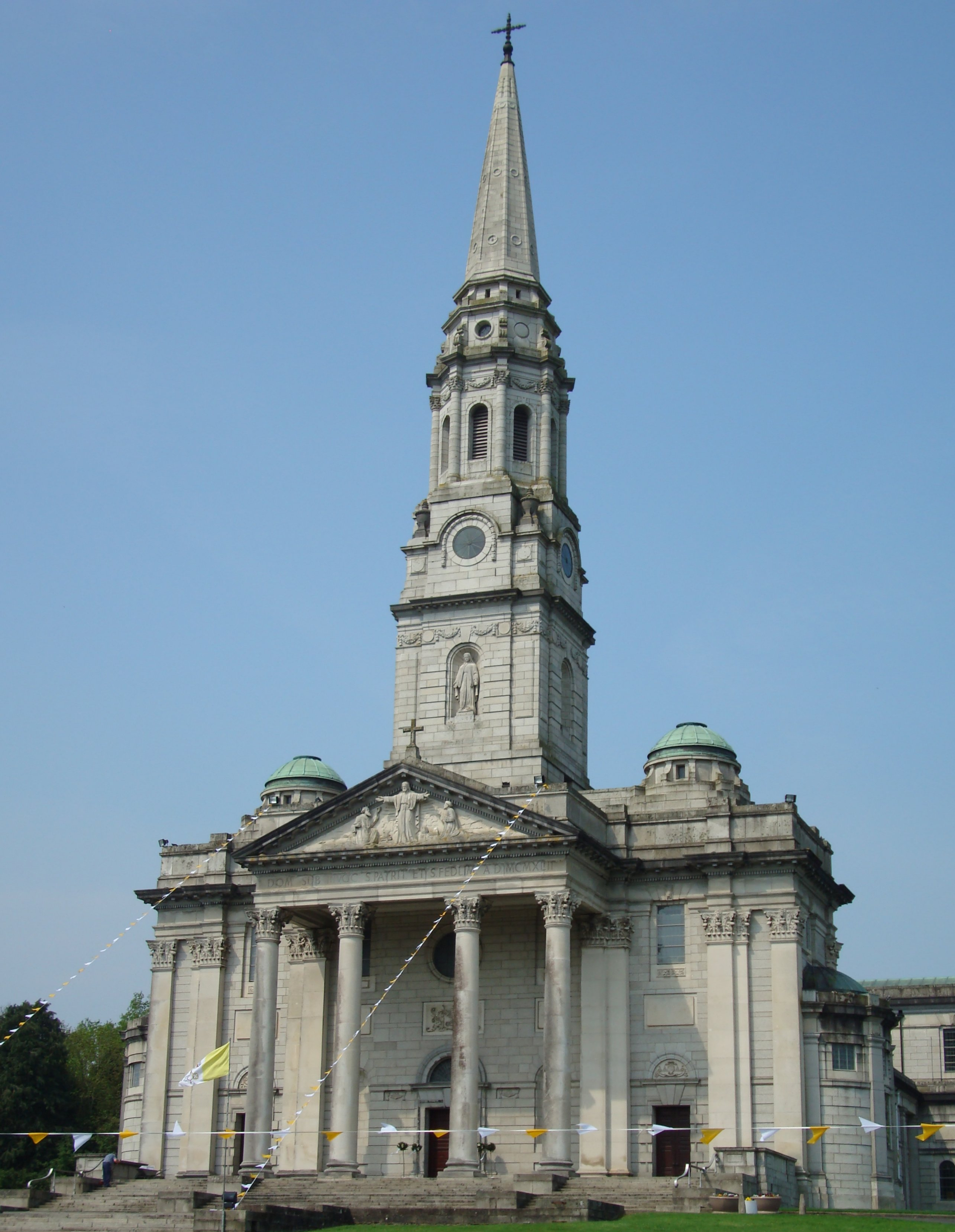
- Cavan Cathedral
- 53°59′54″N 7°21′40″W
- Location: Cavan, County Cavan
- Country: Ireland
- Denomination: Roman Catholic

History
- Status: In Use
- Consecrated: 1947

Architecture
- Style: Neoclassical
- Groundbreaking: 1938
- Completed: 1942
- Construction cost: £209,000

Administration
- Province: Armagh
- Archdiocese: Armagh
- Diocese: Kilmore

Clergy
- Bishop(s): Martin Hayes, Bishop of Kilmore

The Cathedral of Saint Patrick and Saint Felim, also known as Cavan Cathedral, is a Roman Catholic cathedral located in Cavan, Ireland. It is the seat of the Bishop of Kilmore, and the mother church of the Roman Catholic Diocese of Kilmore.

== History ==
In 1152, the Diocese of Kilmore was formally established by Cardinal Giovanni Paparoni at the synod of Kells. In 1454, Pope Nicholas V gave permission for the ancient church at Kilmore (founded in the sixth century by Saint Felim) to be the cathedral church of Kilmore diocese. It was rebuilt and became known in Irish as An Chill Mhór (meaning Great Church) and anglicised as Kilmore, which gave its name to the diocese, a name which has remained ever since. During the Reformation, the Roman Catholic diocese lost possession of the cathedral and all the other temporalities and passed into the hands of the Church of Ireland. Following the completion of the new Anglican cathedral in 1860, the pre-Reformation cathedral became a Church of Ireland parochial hall.

For almost 300 years the Roman Catholic diocese did not have a cathedral. In 1862, Cavan parish church was extended and it became the new cathedral of the diocese under Bishop James Browne.

== The cathedral ==
In 1938 construction of the present cathedral began, and was completed in 1942 under Bishop Patrick Lyons. Ralph Byrne of W.H. Byrne & Son were the architects of the new cathedral. The plan layout is quite unorthodox for Irish churches. The nave is lined with columns which extend down both sides, and unusually turn to form what could appear to be the beginning of a rood screen. Meanwhile, the transepts form a strong line across the cathedral without being impacted by the nave. The altar is in a recess opposite the nave. The church is built in a white granite by John Sisk & Son at a total build cost of £209,000.

Externally the cathedral is dominated by a classical portico surmounted by a tower.

The cathedral was dedicated to Saint Patrick and Saint Felim in 1942 and consecrated in 1947.

== Leaded glass ==
There are artistic stained glass windows by George Collie.

Six stained glass windows from the studios of Harry Clarke were added to the cathedral in 1994.

== Sculpture ==
Some of the sculpture work was undertaken by Albert Power.

== Commentaries ==
The design of the cathedral has not been well received by commentators. "The cathedral is a disappointing sham-Renaissance structure by Ralph Byrne."
