= Eugene Sweeney =

Irish prelate

Styles of Eugene Sweeney
- Reference style: The Most Reverend
- Spoken style: My Lord
- Religious style: Bishop

Eugene Sweeney (1592–1669) was an Irish prelate of the Roman Catholic Church who served as the Bishop of Kilmore from 1629 to 1669.

A native of County Donegal, he was appointed the Bishop of the Diocese of Kilmore by Pope Urban VIII on 18 September 1629.

He died in office on 18 October 1669, aged 77. After his death, the see remained vacant for nearly sixty years, during which time it was administered by vicars general or bishops of Clogher.

Catholic Church titles
Preceded by Hugh O'Reilly (bishop)	Bishop of Kilmore; 1629–1669	Succeeded by See vacant, followed by Patrick Tyrrell (vicar apostolic)
