= Bernard Finegan =

Irish prelate

- Bishop of Kilmore
- Church: Catholic Church
- Diocese: Diocese of Kilmore
- In office: 18 May 1886 – 11 November 1887
- Predecessor: Nicholas Conaty
- Successor: Edward MacGennis

Orders
- Ordination: 1 September 1861
- Consecration: 13 June 1886 by James Donnelly

Personal details
- Born: 15 August 1837 Annagh, County Cavan, United Kingdom of Great Britain and Ireland
- Died: 11 November 1887 (aged 50) Cavan, County Cavan, United Kingdom of Great Britain and Ireland

Styles of Bernard Finegan
- Reference style: The Most Reverend
- Spoken style: My Lord
- Religious style: Bishop

Bernard Finegan (b Annagh, County Cavan 15 August 1837; d. Cavan 11 November 1887) was an Irish prelate who briefly served in the Roman Catholic Church as the Bishop of Kilmore from 1886 to 1887.

== Life ==
Finegan was educated at St Patrick's College, Maynooth. Prior to his episcopal career, Finegan was the parish priest of Drumlane from March 1880 to May 1886. He was appointed the Bishop of the Diocese of Kilmore by Pope Leo XIII on 10 May 1886 and the papal brief was dispatched on 18 May 1886. Finegan's episcopal consecration took place on 13 June 1886; the principal consecrator was James Donnelly, Bishop of Clogher, and the principal co-consecrators were Thomas McNulty, Bishop of Meath and Bartholomew Woodlock, Bishop of Ardagh and Clonmacnoise.

Bishop Finnegan died in office on 11 November 1887, aged 50.

== Notes ==
Catholic Church titles
Preceded by Nicholas Conaty	Bishop of Kilmore; 1886–1887	Succeeded by Edward MacGennis
