= Leo O'Reilly =

Irish former Roman Catholic prelate (born 1944)

The Most Reverend, Dr. Leo O'Reilly DD
- Bishop Emeritus of Kilmore
- Church: Roman Catholic
- Diocese: Kilmore
- Appointed: 16 October 1998
- Installed: 15 November 1998
- Term ended: 31 December 2018
- Predecessor: Francis McKiernan
- Successor: Martin Hayes
- Other post: Chair of the Commission of Education of the Irish Catholic Bishops' Conference
- Previous posts: Coadjutor bishop of the Diocese of Kilmore; Parish priest of Castletara; Chaplain at Bailieborough Community School; Teacher at St Patrick's College, Cavan

Orders
- Ordination: 15 June 1969
- Consecration: 2 February 1997 by Francis McKiernan

Personal details
- Born: Philip Leo O'Reilly; 10 April 1944 (age 82) Cootehill, County Cavan, Ireland
- Parents: Terence and Maureen O'Reilly
- Education: Pontifical Gregorian University; St Patrick's College, Maynooth
- Motto: Veritas liberabit vos (The truth will set you free)

Styles of Leo O'Reilly
- Reference style: The Most Reverend
- Spoken style: Your Grace
- Religious style: Bishop

Philip Leo O'Reilly (born 10 April 1944) is an Irish former Roman Catholic prelate who served as Bishop of Kilmore between 1998 and 2018.

== Early life and education ==
O’Reilly was born in Corgreagh, Kill, Cootehill, County Cavan on 10 April 1944, the son of Terence and Maureen O'Reilly. He later moved with his family to Kilconny, Belturbet, attending primary school at Drumnatrade and Tullyvin National Schools and secondary school at St Patrick's College, Cavan.

O'Reilly studied for the priesthood at St Patrick's College, Maynooth, where he completed a Bachelor of Science and a Bachelor of Divinity.

He was ordained to the priesthood for the Diocese of Kilmore on 15 June 1969.

== Presbyteral ministry ==
Following ordination, O'Reilly's first diocesan appointment was as teacher at St Patrick's College until 1976, where he taught mathematics, science and religion. He went to Rome in 1976 for further studies, serving on the staff of the Pontifical Irish College between 1978 and 1980, and completing a doctorate in biblical theology from the Pontifical Gregorian University in 1981.

O'Reilly returned to the Diocese of Kilmore in 1981, where he was appointed chaplain to Bailieborough Community School.

Between 1988 and 1995, O'Reilly worked as a missionary in the Diocese of Minna, Nigeria, where he later joined the staff of the national seminary of the Missionary Society of St Paul, Abuja. He returned to the Diocese of Kilmore in 1995, where he was appointed parish priest of Castletara (centred on Ballyhaise), succeeding his second cousin and the newly appointed coadjutor archbishop of Armagh, Seán Brady.

== Episcopal ministry ==
=== Coadjutor Bishop of Kilmore ===
O'Reilly was appointed coadjutor bishop-elect of Kilmore by Pope John Paul II on 12 November 1996. He was consecrated by the Bishop of Kilmore, Francis McKiernan, on 2 February 1997 in the Cathedral of Saint Patrick and Saint Felim, Cavan.

=== Bishop of Kilmore ===
Following the retirement of McKiernan as Bishop of Kilmore on 16 October 1998, O'Reilly succeeded to the see with immediate effect. He was subsequently installed on 15 November in the Cathedral of Saint Patrick and Saint Felim, Cavan.

On a national level, O'Reilly chaired the Commission for Education of the Irish Catholic Bishops' Conference.

==== Child protection ====
A report published by the National Board for Safeguarding Children in the Catholic Church on 30 November 2011 found that the Diocese of Kilmore was a "model of best practice" in the area of child protection, mainly due to O'Reilly's "personal commitment and diligence".

The report stated that allegations had been identified against seven priests in the diocese, all of which had been received since 1975, and that all allegations were addressed and reported to the Garda Síochána and the Health Service Executive or preceding health boards. It was also reported that no examples of "poor practice" were found following O'Reilly's elevation to the episcopate in 1998, and his approach to child protection was praised as an "excellent example" for others to follow.

However, it was reported on 18 December that a priest at the centre of abuse allegations and complaints continued to live in a parochial house in the diocese, despite repeated requests from O'Reilly that he move to alternative accommodation.

==== Same-sex marriage ====
Ahead of a Constitutional Convention established by the Government of Ireland in 2013 to consider permitting same-sex marriage, O'Reilly questioned the length of time available to discuss the issue, adding that permitting same-sex marriage would see that the "roles of mother and father are to be consigned to history".

==== Abortion ====
O'Reilly referred to a 2012 decision by the Government of Ireland to legislate with regulations on abortion based on the X Case as the "first step on the road to a culture of death", echoing a phrase popularised by Pope John Paul II in a homily marking World Youth Day 1993.

Following the passing of a referendum on liberalising abortion laws on 25 May 2018, O'Reilly admitted that the Catholic Church in Ireland is in a "new reality" where it is no longer the dominant voice in society, adding that many people in Ireland were Catholic "by culture rather than convention".

==== Ordination of married men and women ====
Following a diocesan listening process, it was reported on 23 June 2015 that O'Reilly sought to discuss with his colleagues at the Irish Catholic Bishops' Conference the possibility of ordaining married men to the priesthood and women to the diaconate.

== Retirement ==
It was announced on 31 December 2018 that O'Reilly had tendered his resignation to Pope Francis on health grounds and in advance of his 75th birthday in accordance with canon law, and that it had been accepted with immediate effect.
