= Andrew Campbell (bishop) =

Irish Roman Catholic prelate

Styles of Andrew Campbell
- Reference style: The Most Reverend
- Spoken style: My Lord
- Religious style: Bishop

Andrew Campbell (died 1769) was an Irish Roman Catholic prelate who served as the Bishop of Kilmore from 1753 to 1769. He trained as a priest in Spain, at the Irish College of San Jorge at Alcalá de Henares, north of Madrid.

He was appointed the Bishop of the Diocese of Kilmore by Pope Benedict XIV on 3 April 1753.

Bishop Campbell died in office on 23 December 1769.

== Notes ==
Catholic Church titles
Preceded by Laurence Richardson	Bishop of Kilmore; 1753–1769	Succeeded by Denis Maguire
