= Martin Hayes (bishop) =

Irish Roman Catholic prelate (born 1959)

The Most Reverend Martin Hayes LPhil
- Bishop of Kilmore
- Church: Catholic Church
- Diocese: Kilmore
- Appointed: 29 June 2020
- Installed: 20 September 2020
- Predecessor: Leo O'Reilly

Orders
- Ordination: 10 June 1989 by Dermot Clifford
- Consecration: 20 September 2020 by Eamon Martin

Personal details
- Born: 24 October 1959 (age 66) Borris, Twomileborris, County Tipperary, Ireland
- Parents: Daniel and Mary Agnes Hayes
- Education: Pontifical Gregorian University; St. Patrick's College, Thurles; NIHE Limerick
- Motto: Your steadfast love endures
- Coat of arms

The Most Rev. Martin Hayes (born 24 October 1959) is an Irish Catholic prelate who has served as Bishop of Kilmore since 2020.

== Early life and education ==
Hayes was born in Borris, Twomileborris, County Tipperary on 24 October 1959, one of eight children, one of whom died in infancy, to Daniel Hayes and his wife Mary Agnes (née Bowe). He attended primary school at St Kevin's National School, Littleton and the Christian Brothers secondary school in Thurles, before completing undergraduate studies in production engineering at NIHE Limerick, graduating with a Bachelor of Science in manufacturing engineering in 1981. As part of his studies, Hayes completed placements in Wyeth Ireland in Askeaton, County Limerick in 1979, and Ecco in Dundalk, County Louth, in 1980.

He started working as a quality engineer with Amdahl Corporation in Swords, County Dublin, in November 1981, completing his initial orientation with the parent plant in Silicon Valley, California, where he was responsible for setting up quality control systems for new products.

During his time in Limerick, Hayes became involved in Muintearas Íosa, a youth ministry group in the Diocese of Limerick, helping to organise events in the Archdioceses of Dublin and Cashel and Emly in the early 1980s.

Hayes began studying for the priesthood at St. Patrick's College, Thurles in 1983, completing a certificate in philosophy and a National Diploma in theology, the latter of which was awarded by St Patrick's College, Maynooth.

He was ordained a priest for the Archdiocese of Cashel and Emly on 10 June 1989.

== Presbyteral career ==
Following ordination, Hayes completed a licentiate in philosophy, with a focus on anthropology, at the Pontifical Gregorian University, Rome, while staying at the Pontifical Irish College. He returned to Ireland in 1991, where he taught philosophy at St Patrick's College, Thurles. It was during this time that he also worked as a pre-marriage course facilitator with Accord, serving as diocesan director with personnel in its Thurles and Tipperary centres and establishing an administrative office to co-ordinate its activities.

Hayes was appointed bursar of St Patrick's College, Thurles in 1997, during which time he was instrumental in setting up Suicide: Understanding and Support (SUAS), a listening service for those bereaved by suicide, as part of diocesan Millennium initiatives and in co-operation with the Mid-Western Health Board. Hayes also undertook summer pastoral experience in the Diocese of Sacramento, California.

In August 2001, he undertook a sabbatical year, studying ecology at the Jesuit School of Theology, Berkeley, California and separately at Tabgha Farm – Centre for Ecology & Spirituality in Cessnock, New South Wales, Australia.

Upon his return to Ireland in September 2002, Hayes was appointed curate in the cathedral parish in Thurles, with responsibility for Ss Joseph & Brigid Church, Bóthar na Naomh, while resuming his role as a pre-marriage course facilitator with Accord in Thurles, supporting Accord personnel in the South-East Region and serving on its National Executive Council.

He also worked part-time as a philosophy lecturer on the newly established Bachelor of Arts in Education, Business Studies & Religious Studies course for secondary school student teachers in St Patrick's College, Thurles, and audited the two-year Ecology & Theology programme provided by the Columban Fathers in Dalgan Park, Navan, County Meath.

Hayes was appointed administrator of the cathedral parish in July 2007, laying the foundations for the formation of a parish pastoral council in 2017. During his administration, Ss Joseph & Brigid Church, Bóthar na Naomh was renovated, a pastoral centre was constructed and the cathedral presbytery was refurbished. He was also elected a member of the diocesan council of priests, before being elected as its chair in 2015 and again in 2020, and becoming a member of the newly established diocesan pastoral council.

Hayes was appointed to diocesan director of pastoral planning and development in August 2017, co-ordinating diocesan and presbyteral listening processes between 2017 and 2018, and the formulation of a draft pastoral plan in spring 2020, with a view to implementing a diocesan pastoral plan for parishes between 2020 and 2025.

Hayes also served as diocesan delegate for the World Meeting of Families and the visit of Pope Francis to Ireland in 2018.

== Episcopal ministry ==
Hayes was appointed Bishop-elect of Kilmore by Pope Francis on 29 June 2020. Speaking to Northern Sound following his appointment, he expressed hope that the reopening of churches may lead to the rejuvenation of faith.

Hayes was consecrated by The Most Rev. Eamon Martin, Archbishop of Armagh and Primate of All Ireland, on 20 September at the Cathedral of Ss Patrick and Felim, Cavan.

In an interview with The Irish Catholic on 24 September 2020, Bishop Hayes warned of nervousness among priests and parishioners in border parishes over the threat of a no-deal Brexit. In the same interview, Hayes also said that priestly vocations and renewal in the Church would only come out of parishes that prioritise youth ministry.

He represented the Irish Catholic Bishops' Conference at the United Nations Climate Change conference, held between 31 October and 13 November 2021 in Glasgow. In an interview with The Irish Catholic following the conference, Hayes expressed a need for farmers to be supported in their transition to more sustainable farming methods as part of the just transition movement.
