= Hugh O'Reilly (archbishop of Armagh) =

Irish prelate

Styles of Hugh O'Reilly
- Reference style: The Most Reverend
- Spoken style: Your Grace or Archbishop

Hugh O'Reilly (Irish: Aodh Ó Raghallaigh; c.1580 – 1653) was an Irish prelate of the Roman Catholic Church. He served as Bishop of Kilmore from 1625 to 1628 and Archbishop of Armagh from 1628 to 1653.

He was the son of Honora and Mulmore O'Reilly, who was the grandson of the chief of the O'Reilly clan, Fearghal macSeaán, who ruled East Breifne from 1526–1534. Hugh O'Reilly was thus eligible for election to the chieftainship under the system of deirbhfhine. Hugh O'Reilly's genealogy is Aodh son of Maol Mórdha son of Aodh son of Fearghal son of Seaán son of Cathal son of Eóghan na Fésóige. Mulmore O'Reilly had four sons by his wife Honora: Émonn, Hugh O'Reilly (Archbishop of Armagh), Fearghal and Domhnall. He also had an illegitimate son, Cathaoir. In the Plantation of Ulster by grant dated 29 April 1611, King James VI and I granted the town and lands of Gortatowill containing 6 polls, comprising a total of 300 acres at an annual rent of £3-4s., to Mulmore McHugh McFarrall O'Rely, gent. Gortatowill now comprises the townlands of Prospect, Corlough and Tawnagh in Corlough parish.

== Career ==
Hugh O'Reilly was born in the townland of Aghaweely Lower in the parish of Ballintemple and was educated by the local Franciscan Order. He was ordained a priest in 1618 and pursued further studies in Rouen College. He was appointed Bishop of Kilmore on 9 June 1625, and consecrated at St Peter's Church, Drogheda by Archbishop Thomas Fleming of Dublin in July 1625.

Three years later, he was translated to the Metropolitan see of Armagh as archbishop and primate by three consistorial acts: dated 5 May, 31 July, and 31 August 1628.

O'Reilly is perhaps most famous for calling a synod of bishops at Kells, County Meath in March 1642 to discuss the ongoing Irish Rebellion of 1641. The synod called for an end to the killing of unarmed civilians and robberies, and most considered that the aims of the conflict in support of Catholic rights and King Charles amounted to a just war. A smaller group of clergy met with the Catholic nobility at Kilkenny from May 1642, resulting in the founding of the Irish Confederacy later that year, which O'Reilly supported for the rest of his life.

He died in office in February 1653, aged 72, and was buried on Trinity Island in Lough Oughter, the southern part of the Lough Erne complex, although he is also recorded as being buried in Cavan at Abbeylands, in a grave with Owen Roe and "Miles the Slasher".

== Bibliography ==
- Brady, W. Maziere (1876). The Episcopal Succession in England, Scotland and Ireland, A.D. 1400 to 1875. Vol. 1. Rome: Tipografia Della Pace.
- Fryde, E. B.; Greenway, D. E.; Porter, S.; Roy, I., eds. (1986). Handbook of British Chronology (3rd, reprinted 2003 ed.). Cambridge: Cambridge University Press. ISBN 0-521-56350-X.

Catholic Church titles
Preceded by Richard Brady	Bishop of Kilmore; 1625–1628	Succeeded by Eugene Sweeney
Vacant Title last held by Hugh McCaughwell	Archbishop of Armagh and Primate of All Ireland; 1628–1653	Vacant Title next held by Edmund O'Reilly
