= St Patrick's College, Cavan =

St Patrick’s College
- Coláiste Naomh Pádraig

Location
- Cavan; Ireland; 54.0098°N 7.3516°W

Information
- Motto: Ad Meliora (Towards Better Things)
- Religious affiliation: Roman Catholic
- Established: 1871
- Principal: Seán Stack
- Gender: Male
- Affiliation: Diocese of Kilmore
- Website: stpatscavan.ie

Saint Patrick's College (Irish: Coláiste Naomh Padraig) is a Roman Catholic all-male secondary school in County Cavan, Ireland. It was founded in 1871 as a minor and major seminary for the Diocese of Kilmore. It was officially opened by the Bishop of Kilmore, Dr Nicholas Conaty in 1874 for the Diocese of Kilmore, replacing St Augustine's Seminary (Kilmore Academy) established by Dr James Browne in 1839.

Kilmore Academy had both clerical and non-clerical students, over 100 clerical students went on to Maynooth College to be priests.

It was a day and boarding school, ceasing in 1998 as a boarding school. The Kilmore Diocese Pastoral Centre opened in 2005 and is based in the old boarding school wing. The year 2010 saw planning permission given for a new school building reportedly estimated to cost €8.6 million, which the school took possession of in summer 2012.

== Subjects ==
The school offers leaving certificate subjects such as Irish, English, French, German, Mathematics, Physics & Chemistry, Biology, Agricultural Science, Computer Studies, Accounting, Economics, Business, History, Geography, Art, Construction Studies, Music, Technical Drawing, as well as Career Guidance, P.E., and Religion.

The schools Junior Cert cycle includes Irish, English French, German, Computer Studies, Mathematics, Science, Business Studies, Home Economics, History, Geography, Art, Materials Technology, Music, Technical Graphics, as well as Civil, Social and Political Education, Religion and P.E.

== Sport ==
The school has won the Ulster MacRory Cup on twelve occasions, firstly in 1935, in Gaelic football. In 1972, it went on to win the all-Ireland schools Hogan Cup. Hurling and soccer are also played as well as, more recently, chess and golf.

== Presidents/Principals ==
Mr Christopher Rowley became Principal in 2013, replacing Dr Liam McNiffe following his retirement. Mr Rowley himself retired in August 2024, with Mr Seán Stack stepping into the role. Previous Presidents/Principals of the college have included, Rev James Dolan, Rev Colm Hurley, Rev Dan Gallogly, Rev. John McTiernan and Rev Gerard Alwill (1997–2003). Mr Patsy Lee (2003–2008) was the first lay principal of the college.

== Past pupils ==
- Seán Brady, cardinal, who was a student at St Patrick's returned as a professor to the college.
- Francis Joseph MacKiernan, bishop
- Philip Leo O'Reilly, bishop
- Francis Duffy, bishop
- T. P. McKenna, actor
- Myles Dungan, broadcaster
- Seán Gallagher, broadcaster
- Joe O'Reilly, politician
- John Joe O'Reilly, footballer
- Justin McKenna, politician
