= Edmund O'Reilly (bishop) =

Irish prelate (1598-1669)

The Most Reverend Edmund O'Reilly
- Archbishop of Armagh; Primate of All Ireland
- Church: Roman Catholic
- Archdiocese: Armagh
- Appointed: 16 April 1657
- Term ended: 8 March 1669
- Predecessor: Hugh O'Reilly
- Successor: Oliver Plunkett

Orders
- Consecration: 26 May 1658 by Florence Conry

Personal details
- Born: 3 January 1598 Dublin, Ireland
- Died: 8 March 1669 (aged 71) Saumur, France

Edmund O'Reilly (3 January 1598 – 8 March 1669) was an Irish prelate of the Roman Catholic Church. He served as the Archbishop of Armagh and Primate of All Ireland from 1657 to 1669.

== Biography ==
His father was Gearoid O'Reilly. Edmund's pedigree is preserved in the Royal Irish Academy (Ms 23 F 11, pp. 32–47 & Ms 23 F 12, p. 31). He was a descendant of the O'Raghallaigh chiefs of East Breifne and was born in Dublin on 3 January 1598. Edmund was educated in Dublin and ordained there in 1629. After ordination he studied at the Catholic University of Leuven, where he held the position of prefect of the college of Irish Secular Ecclesiastics. In 1640 he returned to Dublin and was appointed vicar-general. In 1642 the Roman Catholic Archbishop of Dublin, Thomas Fleming, having been appointed on the Supreme Council of the Confederate Catholics, transferred his residence to Kilkenny and until 1648 O'Reilly administered the Archdiocese of Dublin.

With the triumph of the Puritans he was imprisoned and his deposition was taken on the 8th e 1652. In 1653, ordered to quit the country, he took refuge at the Irish College of Lisle where he was notified of his appointment to the See of Armagh, and shortly after consecrated at Brussels. Ireland was then a dangerous place for ecclesiastics, and not until 1658 did he attempt to visit his diocese; even then he could proceed no further than London.

Once more ordered to quit the country, he returned to France, but in the following year went to Ireland, this time directly from France, and for the next two years exercised his ministry. Accused of favouring the Puritans and of being an enemy of the Stuarts, he was ordered by the pope to quit Ireland.

At Rome he was able to vindicate himself, but he was not allowed to return to Ireland by the English authorities until 1665, and then only in the hope that he would favour the Remonstrance of Peter Valesius Walsh. O'Reilly, like the great majority of the Irish bishops and priests, rejected it, nor could the entreaties of Walsh or the threats of James Butler, 1st Duke of Ormonde change him. In consequence he was imprisoned by Ormonde, and when released, driven from the kingdom.

He spent the remaining years of his life in France, chiefly concerned with the care of the Irish colleges there. He died at Saumur, France on 8 March 1669 and was buried in the Church of Notre Dame des Ardilliers at Saumur on St. Patrick's Day 17 March 1669.

Catholic Church titles
Preceded by Hugh O'Reilly	Archbishop of Armagh; 1658–1669	Succeeded by Oliver Plunkett
