= Patrick Lyons (bishop of Kilmore) =

Irish prelate

- Bishop of Kilmore
- Church: Catholic Church
- Diocese: Diocese of Kilmore
- In office: 6 August 1937 – 27 April 1949
- Predecessor: Patrick Finegan
- Successor: Austin Quinn

Orders
- Ordination: 19 June 1898
- Consecration: 3 October 1937 by Joseph MacRory

Personal details
- Born: 21 May 1875 Collon, County Louth, United Kingdom of Great Britain and Ireland
- Died: 27 April 1949 (aged 73)

Styles of Patrick Lyons
- Reference style: The Most Reverend
- Spoken style: My Lord
- Religious style: Bishop

Patrick Lyons (1875–1949) was an Irish prelate of the Roman Catholic Church who served as the Bishop of Kilmore from 1937 to 1949.

== Early life and education ==
Born on 21 May 1875 to mother, Ellen Lyons, a teacher and father, John Lyons, who was Head Teacher in Collon School, Collon, County Louth.

He was a brilliant student at Maynooth, was first in his class for six successive years and was ordained a priest for the Archdiocese of Armagh on 19 June 1898. He undertook postgraduate study in the Dunboyne Institute and won an STL in 1900. Throughout his priestly ministry the Cause for the Canonisation of Oliver Plunkett was a cause close to his heart and it was thus appropriate that he was appointed Parish Priest of Drogheda in 1934. He also served as Vicar General to Cardinal Joseph MacRory.

== Bishop of Kilmore ==
He was appointed the Bishop of the Diocese of Kilmore by Pope Pius XI on 6 August 1937. His episcopal consecration took place on 3 October 1937; the principal consecrator was Cardinal Joseph MacRory, Archbishop of Armagh, and the principal co-consecrators were Patrick MacKenna Bishop of Clogher and Edward Mulhern, Bishop of Dromore.

== Cavan Cathedral ==
He is mostly remembered for his work in fundraising and supervising the construction of a new Cathedral in Cavan to serve as episcopal seat.

Bishop Lyons died in office on 27 April 1949, aged 73.

== Notes ==
Catholic Church titles
Preceded by Patrick Finegan	Bishop of Kilmore; 1937–1949	Succeeded by Austin Quinn
