= Richard Brady =

Irish prelate

Styles of Richard Brady, O.F.M.
- Reference style: The Most Reverend
- Spoken style: My Lord
- Religious style: Bishop

Richard Brady, O.F.M. (died 1607) was an Irish prelate of the Roman Catholic Church who served as Bishop of Ardagh from 1576 to 1580 and then Bishop of Kilmore from 1580 to 1607.

A Franciscan friar, he was appointed the Bishop of Ardagh by Pope Gregory XIII on 23 January 1576. Four years later, Brady was translated to the bishopric of Kilmore on 9 March 1580. He held the honours (temporalities) of the Church of Ireland See of Kilmore until they were deprived by Sir John Perrot, Lord Deputy of Ireland in 1585.

He died in September 1607, and was buried in the cloister of Multifernan Abbey, about 6 miles (9.7 km) north of Mullingar, Westmeath.

== Notes ==
Catholic Church titles
Preceded by Patrick MacMahon	Bishop of Ardagh; 1576–1580	Succeeded by Edmund MacGauran
Preceded by Hugh O'Sheridan	Bishop of Kilmore; 1580–1607	Succeeded by Hugh O'Reilly
