= Tuathal Ua Connachtaig =

12th century Irish bishop

Tuathal Ua Connachtaig (known in Latin as Thaddaeus) was an Irish bishop in the 12th century.

He was present at the Synod of Kells in March 1152. He took the oath of fealty to Henry II in 1172 as Bishop of Kells, but is more often recorded as Breifne.
