= Tadeo O'Farrell =

Most Reverend Tadeo O'Farrell
- Bishop of Clonfert
- Church: Catholic Church
- In office: 1587–1602
- Predecessor: Roland de Burgo
- Successor: John de Burgh (bishop)
- Previous post: Auxiliary Bishop of Sigüenza (1589–1599)

Orders
- Consecration: 30 August 1587 by Girolamo Bernerio

Personal details
- Died: 1602 Clonfert, Ireland

Tadeo O'Farrell (also Tadhg O'Farrell, Tadhg MacEoga, or Thady Farrell) (died 1602) was a Roman Catholic prelate who served as Bishop of Clonfert (1587–1602) and Auxiliary Bishop of Sigüenza, (1589–1599).

== Biography ==
O'Farrell was ordained a priest in the Order of Preachers. On 8 June 1587, he was appointed during the papacy of Pope Sixtus V as Bishop of Clonfert. On 30 August 1587, he was consecrated bishop by Girolamo Bernerio, Bishop of Ascoli Piceno, with Edmund MacGauran, Archbishop of Armagh, and Agostino Quinzio, Bishop of Korčula, serving as co-consecrators. In 1589, he was appointed during the papacy of Pope Sixtus V as Auxiliary Bishop of Sigüenza. In 1599, he resigned as Auxiliary Bishop of Sigüenza. He served as Bishop of Clonfert until his death in 1602.

Catholic Church titles
Preceded by Roland de Burgo	Bishop of Clonfert; 1587–1602	Succeeded by John de Burgh (bishop)
