= Austin Quinn =

Irish bishop

The Most Reverend Austin Quinn
- Roman Catholic Diocese of Kilmore
- Church: Catholic Church
- Diocese: Diocese of Kilmore
- In office: 1950–1972; (died)
- Predecessor: Patrick Lyons (bishop of Kilmore)
- Successor: Francis Joseph MacKiernan
- Previous post: Vicar General Archdiocese of Armagh

Orders
- Ordination: 20 June 1915
- Consecration: 10 Sept 1950 by John D'Alton

Personal details
- Born: 15 March 1892 Brootally, Madden in the parish of Derrynoose
- Died: 24 Sept 1974 Cavan

Styles of Austin Quinn
- Reference style: The Most Reverend
- Spoken style: Your Lordship or Bishop
- Religious style: Bishop
- Posthumous style: not applicable

Austin Quinn (1892–1974) was an Irish prelate of the Roman Catholic Church who served as the Bishop of Kilmore from 1950 to 1972.

== Early life and education ==
Quinn was born in Derrynoose, County Armagh, Ireland on 15 March 1892. He studied first at St. Patrick's College, Armagh and then at St. Patrick's College, Maynooth where he was ordained to the priesthood on 20 June 1915.

He undertook postgraduate studies in St. Patrick's College, Maynooth from 1915 – 1917 and was appointed professor of theology in All Hallows College Dublin where he taught for ten years before returning to his diocese to serve as a curate first in Ardee (1927–1930) and then Armagh (1930 – 1940).

In 1939 he became Adm. of Armagh Parish and in 1943 he was appointed Parish Priest of Drogheda and Vicar General of the Archdiocese of Armagh. He was thus a close collaborator of Cardinal John D'Alton and the promoter of the cause of the beatification of Oliver Plunkett.

== Bishop of Kilmore ==
He was appointed the Bishop of the Diocese of Kilmore by Pope Pius XII on 19 July 1950. Quinn's episcopal consecration took place on 10 September 1950; the principal consecrator was Archbishop John Francis D'Alton of Armagh, and the principal co-consecrators were Bishop William MacNeely of Raphoe and Bishop James Joseph MacNamee of Ardagh and Clonmacnoise.

Bishop Quinn participated in all four sessions of the Second Vatican Council, held between in 1962 and 1965.

The infamous Kilnacrott Abbey was in Quinn's diocese and it has been reported that he rarely saw eye to eye with Abbot Felim Colwell whose lax discipline is held to be responsible for permitting Fr Brendan Smyth to abuse children.

He retired on 11 October 1972 and died on 24 September 1974, aged 82.

== Notes ==
Catholic Church titles
Preceded by Patrick Lyons	Bishop of Kilmore; 1950–1972	Succeeded by Francis Joseph MacKiernan
