= Francis Joseph MacKiernan =

Irish prelate

The Most Reverend Francis J. MacKiernan
- Bishop of Kilmore
- Church: Roman Catholic Church
- Province: Armagh
- Diocese: Kilmore
- Appointed: 11 October 1972
- Term ended: 16 October 1998
- Predecessor: Austin Quinn
- Successor: Philip Leo O'Reilly

Orders
- Ordination: 17 June 1951
- Consecration: 10 December 1972 by William Conway

Personal details
- Born: Francis Joseph MacKiernan; 3 February 1926 Stradrinan, Aughawillan, County Leitrim
- Died: 23 December 2005 (aged 79) Cavan General Hospital, Cavan
- Buried: Crypt of the Cathedral Church of St Patrick and St Felim, Cavan
- Denomination: Roman Catholic
- Education: St. Patrick's College, Cavan; St Patrick's College, Maynooth

Francis Joseph MacKiernan (1926–2005) was an Irish prelate of the Catholic Church. He served as the Bishop of Kilmore from 1972 to 1998 and chaired the coordinating committee for the visit of Pope John Paul II to Ireland.

== Early life and ministry ==
He was born in Stradrinan, Aughawillan, County Leitrim on 3 February 1926. He attended Aghawillin National School where he contributed tales to the 1938 Dúchas folklore collection. After his training for the priesthood at St. Patrick's College, Cavan (1939–1944) and St Patrick's College, Maynooth, he was ordained a priest for the Diocese of Kilmore on 17 June 1951.

His first pastoral appointment was as a curate at St Malachy's Church, Belfast in 1951. The next year, he was appointed to the staff of St Patrick's College, Cavan, where he taught Latin, Greek and Christian doctrine, a position he held for ten years. He was the founding president of St Felim's College, Ballinamore, a position he held from 1962 to 1972.

== Episcopal career ==
He was appointed the Bishop of Kilmore by Pope Paul VI on 11 October 1972. His episcopal consecration took place on 10 December 1972, the principal consecrator was Cardinal William Conway, Archbishop of Armagh, and the principal co-consecrators were Archbishop Gaetano Alibrandi, Apostolic Nuncio to Ireland and Bishop Neil Farren of Derry.

In 1979, he was chairman of the National Committee which organised the visit of Pope John Paul II to Ireland. He was chairman of the Episcopal Commission for Education for many years and played a key part in the setting up of the present structures for the boards of management of primary schools.

He celebrated the silver jubilee of his episcopal ordination at the Cathedral Church of St Patrick and St Felim, Cavan on 14 December 1997, with Cardinal Seán Brady, Archbishop of Armagh, reading the homily.

After twenty-six years service to the Diocese of Kilmore, he resigned on 16 October 1998 and assumed the title Bishop emeritus of Kilmore. He died after a short illness in Cavan General Hospital on 23 December 2005, aged 79. Following his funeral at the Cathedral Church of St Patrick and St Felim in Cavan on 28 December 2005, his remains were buried in the cathedral crypt.

Catholic Church titles
Preceded by Austin Quinn	Bishop of Kilmore; 1972–1998	Succeeded by Philip Leo O'Reilly
