= Andrew Boylan (bishop) =

Irish bishop

The Most Reverend Andrew Boylan
- Roman Catholic Diocese of Kilmore
- Church: Catholic Church
- Diocese: Diocese of Kilmore
- In office: 1907–1910; (died)
- Predecessor: Edward MacGennis
- Successor: Patrick Finegan

Orders
- Ordination: 31 March 1867
- Consecration: 19 May 1907 by Michael Logue

Personal details
- Born: 1 August 1842 Cavan
- Died: Cavan

Styles of Andrew Boylan
- Reference style: The Most Reverend
- Spoken style: Your Lordship or Bishop
- Religious style: Bishop
- Posthumous style: not applicable

Andrew Boylan, C.Ss.R. (1842–1910) was an Irish prelate of the Roman Catholic Church who served as the Bishop of Kilmore from 1907 to 1910.

== Early life and education ==
It is uncertain where exactly he was born but believed to be in either the townlands of Tonylion or Kilnaleck in the civil parish of Crosserlough, County Cavan, Ireland on 1 August 1842. Boylan was ordained a priest for the Diocese of Kilmore on 31 March 1867. A bright student, he joined the staff of Maynooth College and served there as Bursar.

== The Redemptorists ==
The Congregation of the Most Holy Redeemer arrived in the UK in the 1860s and experienced great growth. At the invitation of several Irish bishops the order came to Ireland in the 1870s and many of the early priests were already diocesan clergy. Boylan felt a calling to the values of the order and was professed a priest of the Congregation of the Most Holy Redeemer on 15 October 1888.

When the houses in Ireland were separated from the houses in England in 1898 to form a stand-alone province, Boylan became the first Irish Superior. In this role Boylan was responsible for the arrival of the Irish Redemptorists in Cebu Philippines in 1906 after a long period of consultation with the Holy See and the civil authorities in the Philippines. He travelled extensively to Italy, the United States and the Philippines and it was little surprise that, when the vacancy occurred, when he was nominated for his native diocese as Bishop of Kilmore.

== Bishop of Kilmore ==
He was appointed the Bishop of the Diocese of Kilmore by Pope Pius X on 13 March 1907. Boylan's episcopal consecration took place on 19 May 1907; the principal consecrator was Cardinal Michael Logue, Archbishop of Armagh, and the principal co-consecrators were Joseph Hoare, Bishop of Ardagh and Clonmacnoise and Henry Henry, Bishop of Down and Connor.

Bishop Boylan died in office on 25 March 1910, aged 67.

== Notes ==
Catholic Church titles
Preceded by Edward MacGennis	Bishop of Kilmore; 1907–1910	Succeeded by Patrick Finegan
