= Nicholas Conaty =

Irish Roman Catholic bishop

- Bishop of Kilmore
- Church: Catholic Church
- Diocese: Diocese of Kilmore
- In office: 11 April 1865 – 17 January 1886
- Predecessor: James Browne
- Successor: Bernard Finegan
- Previous posts: Titular Bishop of Rhodiapolis (1863-1865); Coadjutor Bishop of Kilmore (1863-1865)

Orders
- Ordination: 17 June 1848
- Consecration: 24 May 1863 by Joseph Dixon

Personal details
- Born: 1820 Kilsallagh, County Cavan, United Kingdom of Great Britain and Ireland
- Died: 17 January 1886 (aged 65–66)

Styles of Nicholas Conaty
- Reference style: The Most Reverend
- Spoken style: My Lord
- Religious style: Bishop

Nicholas Conaty (1820–1886) was an Irish Roman Catholic bishop.

He was born in Kilsallagh to John Conaty and his wife Honora Brady and educated at Kilmore Academy before completing his clerical studies in Maynooth College. Conaty was ordained a priest on 17 June 1848. He was on the staff of Cavan Diocesan Seminary from then until 1854. He was parish priest of Castlerahan from 1854 to 1863. Conaty was appointed co-adjutor Bishop of Kilmore in 1863, and Bishop of Kilmore in 1865 succeeding Dr James Browne. Before becoming a bishop he was a professor in Kilmore Diocesan Seminary, he also taught at All Hallows College Dublin, and served as parish priest in Knocktemple, County Cavan.

He established the new diocesan seminary and school St. Patrick's College, Cavan and employed the renowned church architect William Hague on its building and other church buildings in the diocese. He brought the Poor Clares (enclosed order of nuns) to Cavan in the 1860s.

He died on 17 January 1886 and was succeeded by Bernard Finegan, who had been the parish priest of Drumlane, Cavan.

== Published works ==
- The Catholic Church - proved to be the Church of Christ by Rev. N. Conaty, Published by James Duffy, 1852.

Catholic Church titles
Preceded by James Browne	Bishop of Kilmore; 1865–1886	Succeeded by Bernard Finegan
