= Moel Finian =

Irish bishop

Moel Finian (died 967) was an Irish bishop in the 10th century: the son of Uchtain; he was also abbot of Kells.
