= John MacBrady =

Styles of John MacBrady
- Reference style: The Most Reverend
- Spoken style: My Lord
- Religious style: Bishop

John MacBrady (died 1559) was an Irish prelate of the Roman Catholic Church.

MacBrady was appointed Bishop of Kilmore by Pope Paul III, in opposition to Edmund Nugent, on 5 November 1540. He was recognized by the crown in the reign of Queen Mary I. He died in 1559.
