= Kilmore, County Cavan =

Kilmore Irish: An Chill Mhór
- Civil parish
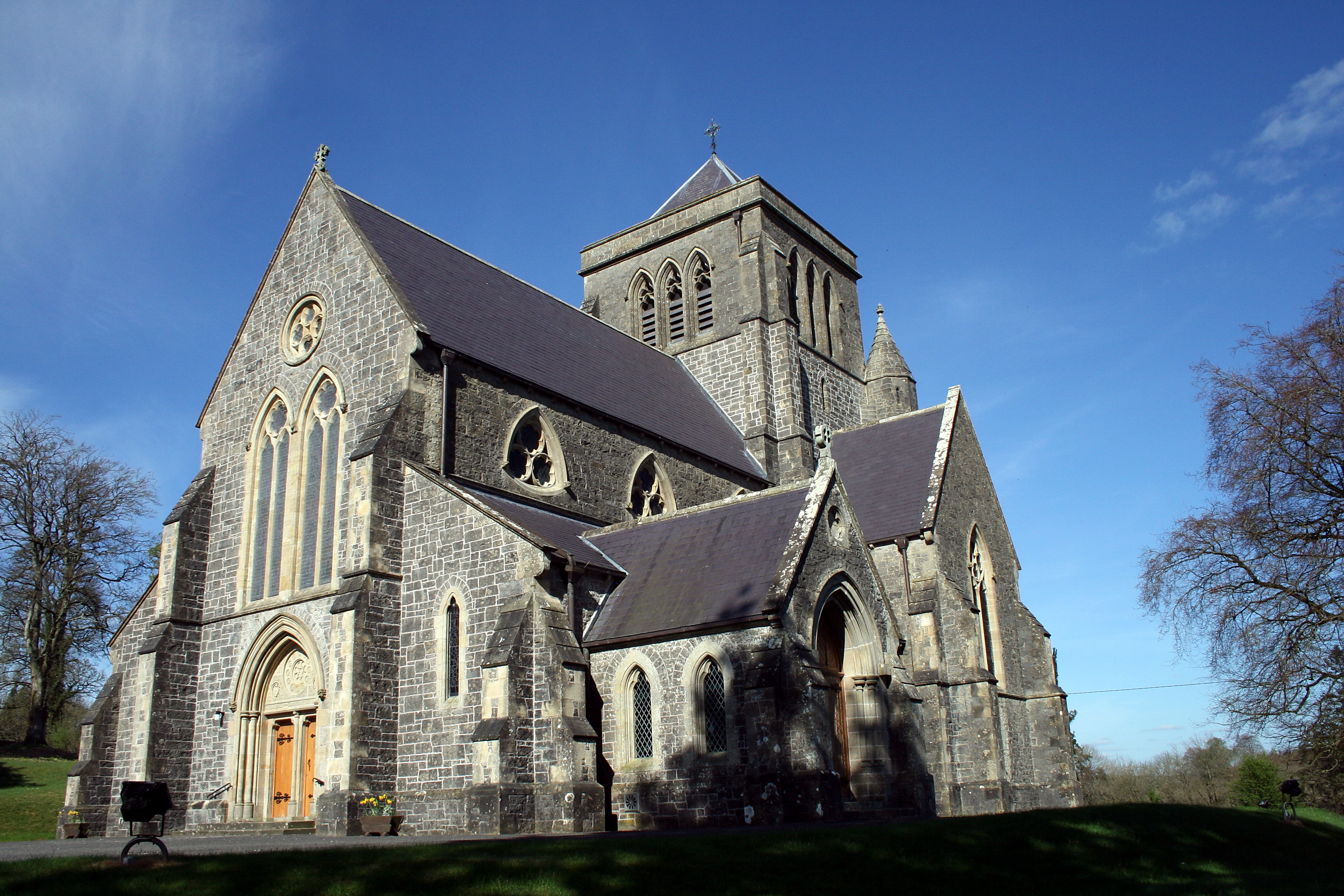
- Kilmore Cathedral

- Location of Kilmore within the Republic of Ireland
- Coordinates: 53°59′35″N 7°24′46″W
- Country: Ireland
- Province: Ulster
- County: County Cavan
- Irish grid reference: H384050

Kilmore (Irish: An Chill Mhór, meaning 'Great Church') is a civil and ecclesiastical parish of County Cavan in Ireland. It is located about 3.5 miles (5.6 km) south-west of the county town of Cavan.

== Civil parish ==
Kilmore gives its name to an Irish civil parish which is located mainly in the barony of Upper Loughtee, but partly in the barony of Clanmahon, all in County Cavan in the Province of Ulster. Civil Parishes were used for local taxation purposes and their boundaries are shown on the nineteenth century Ordnance Survey of Ireland maps. For poor law purposes the civil parish was replaced by district electoral divisions in the mid-nineteenth century. According to the 1851 census the Civil Parish of Kilmore had a total of 91 townlands.

== Ecclesiastical parishes ==
=== Church of Ireland parish ===
The Church of Ireland parish has two places of worship within the Diocese of Kilmore, Elphin and Ardagh. The most historic building is Kilmore Cathedral and is the seat of the Bishop of Kilmore, Elphin and Ardagh. The first church was built by Saint Felim in the sixth century. In 1454, Bishop Aindrias Mac Brádaigh (Andrew McBrady) had this ancient church rebuilt and was given permission by Pope Nicholas V to be the bishop's cathedral. In the 17th century, Bishop Moigne had the cathedral renovated and a bishop's residence built. However, by 1858, the cathedral was described as "decayed, dilapidated and too small to accommodate the parishioners", and so a new cathedral was built in the grounds of the Bishop's Palace at a cost of £8000. It had been planned to demolish to old cathedral, but it was saved and is now used as the Parochial Hall. The second Church of Ireland place of worship in the parish is St Patrick's Church, Ballintemple, near Ballinagh. It was built in 1821 and is a rectangular building with a castellated tower.

William Bedell (Irish: Uilliam Beidil; 1571–1642), Church of Ireland Bishop of Kilmore, is believed to be buried in the churchyard of Kilmore Cathedral. Bishop Bedell, a former Provost of Trinity College Dublin, is famous for commissioning a translation of the Old Testament into Irish in the 17th century. Most of this translation was carried out by Muircheartach Óg Ó Cíonga, the Anglican Rector of Templeport. Bedell was also well-respected by the native Irish Catholic population of County Cavan.

Quite close to Kilmore Cathedral is the See House (also known as the Bishop's Palace), the former official residence of the Bishop of Kilmore, Elphin and Ardagh. The house was built in the late Georgian style in the 1830s and was designed by William Farrell.

=== Catholic parish ===
The Catholic parish has two places of worship. They are two of a number churches in the Diocese of Kilmore. It is not known when St Felim's Church, Ballinagh, was first built, but it existed as a slated church in 1790. A new church, designed by William Hague Jr., was rebuilt in 1869, and rededicated on 7 February. The present church was completed in 1978 and rededicated on 2 July in the same year. The other Catholic place of worship is St Patrick's Church, Drumcor, and was built in 1809. It was extended in 1930 and the windows were replaced with steel frames and tinted cathedral glass. Major restoration was made to building in 1990, and it was rededicated by Francis MacKiernan, Bishop of Kilmore, on 14 July 1991.

== Townlands ==
Kilmore has a total of 14,666 acres (59.35 km^{2}; 22.92 sq mi) and is made up of the following 91 townlands:

- Annagh, 95 acres (0.38 km^{2}; 0.15 sq mi)
- Bellanagh, 136 acres (0.55 km^{2}; 0.21 sq mi)
- Bellville, 364 acres (1.47 km^{2}; 0.57 sq mi)
- Bleancup, 118 acres (0.48 km^{2}; 0.18 sq mi)
- Breandrum, 134 acres (0.54 km^{2}; 0.21 sq mi)
- Cauhoo, 371 acres (1.50 km^{2}; 0.58 sq mi)
- Cavanfin, 66 acres (0.27 km^{2}; 0.10 sq mi)
- Clarebane, 78 acres (0.32 km^{2}; 0.12 sq mi)
- Clonagonnell, 258 acres (1.04 km^{2}; 0.40 sq mi)
- Clonloskan, 137 acres (0.55 km^{2}; 0.21 sq mi)
- Coolnagor (Ricehill), 128 acres (0.52 km^{2}; 0.20 sq mi)
- Cordalea, 128 acres (0.52 km^{2}; 0.20 sq mi)
- Corgarran, 62 acres (0.25 km^{2}; 0.10 sq mi)
- Cormeen, 123 acres (0.50 km^{2}; 0.19 sq mi)
- Cornacrea, 130 acres (0.53 km^{2}; 0.20 sq mi)
- Cornamucklagh, 138 acres (0.56 km^{2}; 0.22 sq mi)
- Corracanvy, 162 acres (0.66 km^{2}; 0.25 sq mi)
- Corratober, 153 acres (0.62 km^{2}; 0.24 sq mi)
- Corraveaty, 45 acres (0.18 km^{2}; 0.07 sq mi)
- Corstruce, 88 acres (0.36 km^{2}; 0.14 sq mi)
- Crenard, 120 acres (0.49 km^{2}; 0.19 sq mi)
- Crossdoney, 32 acres (0.13 km^{2}; 0.05 sq mi)
- Derinish Beg, 51 acres (0.21 km^{2}; 0.08 sq mi)
- Derinish More, 82 acres (0.33 km^{2}; 0.13 sq mi)
- Derries Lower, 246 acres (1.00 km^{2}; 0.38 sq mi)
- Derries Upper, 273 acres (1.10 km^{2}; 0.43 sq mi)
- Derryna, 133 acres (0.54 km^{2}; 0.21 sq mi)
- Derrynagan, 83 acres (0.34 km^{2}; 0.13 sq mi)
- Derrywinny, 104 acres (0.42 km^{2}; 0.16 sq mi)
- Dreenan, 88 acres (0.36 km^{2}; 0.14 sq mi)
- Drumard, 292 acres (1.18 km^{2}; 0.46 sq mi)
- Drumbar, 44 acres (0.18 km^{2}; 0.07 sq mi)
- Drumcarban, 358 acres (1.45 km^{2}; 0.56 sq mi)
- Drumcon, 61 acres (0.25 km^{2}; 0.10 sq mi)
- Drumcor, 108 acres (0.44 km^{2}; 0.17 sq mi)
- Drumcrow, 548 acres (2.22 km^{2}; 0.86 sq mi)
- Drumgor, 38 acres (0.15 km^{2}; 0.06 sq mi)
- Drumhecknagh, 142 acres (0.57 km^{2}; 0.22 sq mi)
- Drumhell, 246 acres (1.00 km^{2}; 0.38 sq mi)
- Drumleny, 137 acres (0.55 km^{2}; 0.21 sq mi)
- Drumlion, 88 acres (0.36 km^{2}; 0.14 sq mi)
- Drummora Great, 279 acres (1.13 km^{2}; 0.44 sq mi)
- Drummora Little, 127 acres (0.51 km^{2}; 0.20 sq mi)
- Drummullan, 103 acres (0.42 km^{2}; 0.16 sq mi)
- Drummurry, 158 acres (0.64 km^{2}; 0.25 sq mi)
- Druumskeagh, 50 acres (0.20 km^{2}; 0.08 sq mi)
- Eonish, 245 acres (0.99 km^{2}; 0.38 sq mi)
- Farragh, 118 acres (0.48 km^{2}; 0.18 sq mi)
- Farranydaly, 237 acres (0.96 km^{2}; 0.37 sq mi)
- Gartbrattan, 264 acres (1.07 km^{2}; 0.41 sq mi)
- Gartnanoul, 246 acres (1.00 km^{2}; 0.38 sq mi)
- Glencorran, 450 acres (1.82 km^{2}; 0.70 sq mi)
- Gortachurk, 105 acres (0.42 km^{2}; 0.16 sq mi)
- Gortnashangan Lower (Bingfield), 123 acres (0.50 km^{2}; 0.19 sq mi)
- Gortnashangan Upper (Hermitage), 163 acres (0.66 km^{2}; 0.25 sq mi)
- Inch Island, 87 acres (0.35 km^{2}; 0.14 sq mi)
- Inishconnell, 154 acres (0.62 km^{2}; 0.24 sq mi)
- Kevit Lower, 134 acres (0.54 km^{2}; 0.21 sq mi)
- Kevit Upper (Castlecosby), 136 acres (0.55 km^{2}; 0.21 sq mi)
- Killygowan, 266 acres (1.08 km^{2}; 0.42 sq mi)
- Killykeen, 178 acres (0.72 km^{2}; 0.28 sq mi)
- Killyvally, 107 acres (0.43 km^{2}; 0.17 sq mi)
- Kilmore Lower, 143 acres (0.58 km^{2}; 0.22 sq mi)
- Kilmore Upper, 226 acres (0.91 km^{2}; 0.35 sq mi)
- Kilsallagh, 75 acres (0.30 km^{2}; 0.12 sq mi)
- Knockakishta, 123 acres (0.50 km^{2}; 0.19 sq mi)
- Legaland, 225 acres (0.91 km^{2}; 0.35 sq mi)
- Lisduff, 125 acres (0.51 km^{2}; 0.20 sq mi)
- Lismore Demesne, 332 acres (1.34 km^{2}; 0.52 sq mi)
- Lisnamandra, 89 acres (0.36 km^{2}; 0.14 sq mi)
- Loughaconnick, 161 acres (0.65 km^{2}; 0.25 sq mi)
- Marahill, 362 acres (1.46 km^{2}; 0.57 sq mi)
- Monnery Lower, 258 acres (1.04 km^{2}; 0.40 sq mi)
- Monnery Upper, 212 acres (0.86 km^{2}; 0.33 sq mi)
- Newtown, 107 acres (0.43 km^{2}; 0.17 sq mi)
- Pollabane, 352 acres (1.42 km^{2}; 0.55 sq mi)
- Pottle, 56 acres (0.23 km^{2}; 0.09 sq mi)
- Rocks, 81 acres (0.33 km^{2}; 0.13 sq mi)
- Sally Island, 4 acres (0.02 km^{2}; 0.01 sq mi)
- Scotch Island, 1 acre (0.00 km^{2}; 0.00 sq mi)
- Shancor, 127 acres (0.51 km^{2}; 0.20 sq mi)
- Shantully, 56 acres (0.23 km^{2}; 0.09 sq mi)
- Slanore, 129 acres (0.52 km^{2}; 0.20 sq mi)
- Snakeel, 255 acres (1.03 km^{2}; 0.40 sq mi)
- Thomascourt (Drumroosk), 59 acres (0.24 km^{2}; 0.09 sq mi)
- Tircullen, 125 acres (0.51 km^{2}; 0.20 sq mi)
- Togher (Danesfort Demesne), 202 acres (0.82 km^{2}; 0.32 sq mi)
- Tonymore, 405 acres (1.64 km^{2}; 0.63 sq mi)
- Trinity Island, 122 acres (0.49 km^{2}; 0.19 sq mi)
- Tully, 90 acres (0.36 km^{2}; 0.14 sq mi)
- Urney, 246 acres (1.00 km^{2}; 0.38 sq mi)
