= Edmund Nugent =

Styles of Edmund Nugent
- Reference style: The right Reverend
- Spoken style: My Lord
- Religious style: Bishop

Edmund Nugent, O.S.A. (died 1550) was an Irish bishop of the Church of Ireland.

Nugent was the last Prior of Tristernagh Abbey. He was appointed bishop on 22 January 1530, but continued to hold the abbey in commendam until he surrendered it to King Henry VIII in 1536 and accepted royal supremacy. He was deprived of the Roman Catholic see by Pope Paul III in 1540, but continued as the Church of Ireland bishop until his death in 1550.
