= James Browne (bishop of Kilmore) =

Irish Roman Catholic clergyman

- Bishop of Kilmore
- Church: Catholic Church
- Diocese: Diocese of Kilmore
- In office: 30 April 1829 – 11 April 1865
- Predecessor: Fargal O'Reilly
- Successor: Nicholas Conaty
- Previous posts: Titular Bishop of Magydus (1827-1829); Coadjutor Bishop of Kilmore (1827-1829)

Orders
- Ordination: 23 May 1812 by John Troy
- Consecration: 10 June 1827 by Patrick Curtis

Personal details
- Born: 1786 Big Barn, County Wexford, Kingdom of Ireland, British Empire
- Died: 11 April 1865 (aged 78–79)

Styles of James Browne
- Reference style: The Most Reverend
- Spoken style: My Lord
- Religious style: Bishop

James Browne (died 1865) was an Irish Roman Catholic clergyman who served as Bishop of Kilmore from 1829 to 1865.

He was appointed Coadjutor Bishop of the Diocese of Kilmore on 20 March 1827 and consecrated on 10 June 1827. He succeeded as Diocesan Bishop of Kilmore on 30 April 1829.

He established the St. Augustine's Seminary (Kilmore Academy), a school and minor seminary for the Diocese of Kilmore, in 1839, and afterwards he acquired a large house and out offices in Farnham Street, Cavan from Captain Joseph Maguire.

He died in office on 11 April 1865.

Catholic Church titles
Preceded by Farrell O'Reilly	Bishop of Kilmore; 1829–1865	Succeeded by Nicholas Conaty
