= Young Social Innovators =

Young Social Innovators,
- Founded: Ireland 2002
- Headquarters: Dublin, Ireland
- Revenue: 1,123,350 euro (2020)
- Total assets: 442,304 euro (2023)
- Number of employees: 22 (2023)
- Website: youngsocialinnovators.ie

Young Social Innovators (YSI) are an Irish non-profit organisation established in 2001. The organisation hosts an annual "social awareness and active citizenship and education programme" for 15-18 year old students from Ireland. Its stated goal is youth-led community based action with lasting effects based around the UN Sustainable Development Goals.

== Former winners ==
- 2002 - Saint Leos College, Carlow - Teenage Motherhood in our Community
- 2003 - East Glendalough School, Wicklow Town - Next train 2020
- 2004 - Loreto Secondary School, Balbriggan, Co. Dublin - Mosney - a Home from Home? Changing attitudes to asylum seekers and refugees in Ireland
- 2005 - Moyne Community School, Moyne, Co. Longford - Don't Drink 'Til You Drop - Think and Stop
- 2006 - St. Vincent's CBS, Glasnevin, Dublin 9 - Can Roses Grow from Concrete?
- 2007 - John the Baptist Community School, Limerick - Dead is Easy, Belt Up and Be Safe
- 2008 - Cólaiste Mhuire, Ennis, Co. Clare - Stomp Out Bullying
- 2009 - Cólaiste Bhríde, Carnew, Co. Wicklow and St. Peter's College, Dunboyne, Co. Meath - The Butterfly Effect
- 2010 - Scoil Mhuire Gan Smal, Blarney, Co Cork - The Mill Street Cafe project
- 2011 - Mount Mercy College, Cork City, Co. Cork - Divert Your Stride From Suicide
- 2012 - Davis College, Mallow, Co. Cork - Forget Me Not
- 2013 - Eureka Secondary School, Kells, Co. Meath - Bring Organ Donation into Education
- 2014 - Coláiste Mhuire, Ennis, Co. Clare - Beware of I.T.
- 2015 - Largy College, Clones, Co. Monaghan - LGBT - Let's Get By Together
- 2016 - Portmarnock Community School, Portmarnock, Co. Dublin - Global Citizens Mapping The Future
- 2017 - Largy College, Clones, Co. Monaghan - Mend a Mind - It's a Disorder Not a Decision
- 2018 - Ardscoil Mhuire, Corbally, Co. Limerick - Sexting, Get the message #keepitpg
- 2019 - Bush Post Primary School, Dundalk, Co. Louth - Let's talk about consent
- 2020 - Cashel Community School, Cashel, Co. Tipperary - Step Up For Accessibility
- 2021 - Mercy Secondary School, Mounthawk, Tralee, Co. Kerry - Red Flags 'Break the Silence'
- 2022 - Loreto Secondary School, Letterkenny, Co. Donegal - 'No Place Like Home'
- 2023 - Holy Family School for the Deaf - Cabra, Co. Dublin - "Deaf Awareness - A Language for all"
- 2024 - Castleisland Community College - Tonbwee - Castleisland, Co. Kerry - "Sun Smarties"
