= Giovanni Paparoni =

Giovanni Cardinal Paparoni (sometimes known in English as John Cardinal Paparo; died ca. 1153/1154) was an Italian Cardinal and prominent papal legate in dealings with Ireland and Scotland.

He was created Cardinal by Pope Celestine II in 1143. Following the death of the previous papal legate to Ireland, St. Malachy, and a number of requests made by both the Irish lay and religious hierarchy, Giovanni was appointed to be the papal legate to Ireland, arriving there in 1151. He presided at the Synod of Kells in 1152, which decided the system of four archbishops (Armagh, Dublin, Cashel, and Tuam) for Ireland. He argued for a reduction in the number of bishops in the Irish Church, and, according to the testimony of Archbishop Felix O Ruadhain of Tuam at the Fourth Lateran Council, began the process of diocesan expansion through which the see of Dublin expanded in the late twelfth and early thirteenth century at the expense of the see of Glendaloch.
