= Papal brief =

Formal document emanating from the pope

A papal brief or breve (from the Latin "breve", meaning "short") is a formal document emanating from the pope.

== History ==
The introduction of briefs, which occurred at the beginning of the pontificate of Pope Eugene IV (3 March 1431 – 23 February 1447), was prompted by a desire for greater simplicity and expedition, such as had already been seen with the disappearance of the greater bulls and the general adoption of the less cumbersome mandamenta. A brief was a compendious papal letter which dispensed with some previous formalities.

Briefs were written on vellum, generally closed, i.e., folded, and sealed in red wax with the papal Ring of the Fisherman. The Pope's name appears first and at the top, normally written in capital letters, e.g.: "PIUS PP III", and instead of the formal salutation in the third person used in papal bulls, the brief at once adopts a direct form of address, e.g., "Dilecte fili—Carissime in Christo fili", the phrase being adapted to the dignity and character of the addressee. The letter begins by way of preamble with a statement of the case and cause of writing and is followed by certain instructions without minatory clauses or other formulae. At the end the date is expressed by the day of the month and year with a mention of the seal, for example in this form: "Datum Romae apud Sanctum Petrum, sub annulo Piscatoris die V Marii, MDLXXXXI, pont. nostri anno primo". The year here specified, which is used in dating briefs, is probably to be understood in any specific instance as the year of the Nativity, beginning 25 December. However, Herbert Thurston (1908) noted that this is not an absolute rule, arguing that "the sweeping statements sometimes made in this matter are not to be trusted". In some instances the years meant are ordinary calendar years, i.e., years beginning with the first of January.

A similar want of uniformity is generally observed in the dating of bulls from the middle of the eleventh century to the end of the eighteenth: Papal bulls were dated by the years of the Incarnation, commencing on 25 March, the Solemnity of the Annunciation. After the institution of briefs by Pope Eugene IV, the use of even lesser bulls, in the form of mandamenta, became notably less frequent. Still, for many purposes, bulls continued to be employed, for example in canonizations, in which case special forms are observed, the pope by exception signing his own name, under which is added a stamp imitating the rota as well as the signatures of several cardinals, as also in the nominations of bishops, promotions to certain benefices, some marriage dispensations, et cetera. But the choice of the precise form of instrument was often arbitrary. For example, in granting the dispensation which enabled King Henry VIII of England to marry his brother's widow, Catherine of Aragon, two forms of dispensation were issued by Pope Julius II, one a brief, seemingly expedited in great haste, and the other a bull which was sent on afterwards. Similarly we may notice that, while the English Catholic hierarchy was restored in 1850 by a brief, Pope Leo XIII in the first year of his reign used a bull to establish the Catholic episcopate of Scotland. So also the Society of Jesus, suppressed by a brief in 1773, was restored by a bull in 1818.

Since the sixteenth century, briefs have been written in a very legible Roman hand upon a sheet of vellum of convenient size, while even the wax with its guard of silk and the impression of the fisherman's ring was replaced in 1842 by a stamp which affixed the same devices in red ink. The bulls, on the other hand, to the death of Pope Pius IX retained many medieval features apart from great size, leaden seal, and Roman mode of dating. In particular, although from about 1050 to the Reformation the writing employed in the Cancellaria Apostolica did not noticeably differ from the ordinary bookhand familiar throughout Christendom, the engrossers of papal bulls, even after the sixteenth century, continued using an archaic and very artificial type of writing known as "scrittura bollatica", with manifold contractions and an absence of any punctuation, which was practically undecipherable by ordinary readers. It was the custom in issuing a bull to accompany it with a "transsumption" (copy) in ordinary manuscript. This state of things was ended by a motu proprio of Pope Leo XIII shortly after his election: bulls were written in the same, legible Roman script that was used for briefs, and in view of the difficulties arising from transmission by post, the old leaden seal was replaced in many cases by a simple stamp bearing the same device in red ink.

The "minutanti", being specialized Roman curials, employed in the preparation of briefs form a separate department under the presidency of a palatine cardinal styled the "Cardinal Secretary of Briefs" with the "Secretary of Latin Briefs and Briefs to the Princes", which office carried the dignity of prelate, as his substitute.

When in the early 20th century the Secretariate of Briefs to Princes and of Latin Letters was placed under the direction of the Cardinal Secretary of State, the offices of this great department were transferred to the Apostolic Palace in Vatican City and established in the unoccupied halls of the old picture gallery, all on the same floor. The extent of business transacted there is evidenced by the archives.

== See also ==
- Papal bull
