= 1935 in Ireland =

- Centuries: 18th; 19th; 20th; 21st
- Decades: 1910s; 1920s; 1930s; 1940s; 1950s
- See also: 1935 in Northern Ireland; Other events of 1935; List of years in Ireland

Events from the year 1935 in Ireland.

== Incumbents ==
- Governor-General: Domhnall Ua Buachalla
- President of the Executive Council: Éamon de Valera (FF)
- Vice-President of the Executive Council: Seán T. O'Kelly (FF)
- Minister for Finance: Seán MacEntee (FF)
- Chief Justice: Hugh Kennedy
- Dáil: 8th
- Seanad: 1934 Seanad

== Events ==
=== January ===
- 3 January – An Anglo-Irish Coal-Cattle Pact was signed between the governments of Britain and the Irish Free State.
- 20 January – Forty men from the Connemara Gaeltacht travelled to County Meath to inspect the area which was to be settled by residents of the Gaeltacht.
- 27 January – Relics and souvenirs of the 1916 Easter Rising arrived at the National Museum.

=== February ===
- 28 February – The Criminal Law Amendment Act dealt with various sexual offences. Section 17 explicitly made the import or sale of contraceptive devices illegal.

=== March ===
- 3 March – In his Lenten pastoral, Thomas O'Doherty, Bishop of Galway, denounced immodest dress and vulgar films. Membership of Trinity College Dublin was still forbidden for Catholics and membership of the Irish Republican Army and Communist organisations remained mortal sins.
- 20 March – After 17 days of a bus strike, the army intervened at the request of the Minister for Industry and Commerce by providing lorries for transport.
- 26 March – Seventy-two Republicans were arrested and held at the Bridewell Garda station.

=== April ===
- 1 April – The National Athletics and Cycling Association was suspended from the International Amateur Athletic Federation for refusing to confine its activities to the Free State side of the British-Irish border.
- 12 April – Eleven families from the Connemara Gaeltacht arrived in County Meath to set up the Ráth Cairn Gaeltacht.

=== July ===
- 14 July – Five people were killed and seventy injured as a result of sectarian rioting in Belfast. This results in Sectarian rioting across Ireland.

=== October ===
- 26 October – Edward Carson, the Dublin-born Unionist leader and barrister, was buried in Belfast.
- 27 October – Leni Riefenstahl's Nazi propaganda film Triumph of the Will (Triumph des Willens) was presented at the Olympia Theatre in Dublin. The event was organised by the German Legation and was attended by about 200 people. Gardaí Síochána, who feared the screening would be disrupted by communists, provided heavy protection inside and outside the theatre, and noted the attendance of the minister for lands and fisheries, Senator Joseph Connolly, as well as diplomats from Belgium, France, Germany, and Poland. Another Nazi film, Hitlerjunge Quex, was also shown about a teenage Hitler Youth, Herbert "Quex" Norkus, who was murdered by communists.

=== November ===
- 9 November – Arranmore boat tragedy: 19 of 20 on board were killed when a yawl ran aground on the crossing from Burtonport.

=== December ===
- 7 December – The Ireland national rugby union team was beaten by New Zealand and the Irish association football team was beaten by the Netherlands.
- 16 December – Foynes in County Limerick was chosen to be the European terminal of a transatlantic flying boat air service.

=== Full date unknown ===
- In the first major investigation into political corruption in Ireland since the formation of the Free State, the "Wicklow Gold Inquiry" cleared the Minister for Industry and Commerce Seán Lemass of wrongdoing in the granting of mining licences in County Wicklow to Fianna Fáil party politicians.
- William Magner began commercial cider production in Clonmel, County Tipperary.
- A statue of Queen Victoria which was erected in 1849 on the gable of the Aula Maxima building at Queen's College, Cork is taken down, and put in storage in an East Wing office space

== Arts and literature ==
- 2 April – First meeting of the Irish Folklore Commission, set up by the government under the direction of Séamus Ó Duilearga to study and collect information on folklore and traditions.
- 12 August – Seán O'Casey's play The Silver Tassie, set in World War I and premièred in 1929 in London, was first performed at the Abbey Theatre in Dublin, where it proved to be controversial.
- 23 September – The fourth Theatre Royal opened in Dublin.
- Samuel Beckett published his poetry, Echo's Bones and Other Precipitates.
- Sinéad de Valera produced her play Cluichidhe na Gaedhilge.
- Oliver St. John Gogarty published his first prose work, As I Was Going Down Sackville Street: A Phantasy in Fact.
- Norah Hoult published her novel Holy Ireland.
- Louis MacNeice published his Poems.
- W. B. Yeats published his poetry A Full Moon in March.

== Sport ==
=== Association football ===
- League of Ireland
  Winners: Dolphins
  FAI Cup
  Winners: Bohemians 4–3 Dundalk

=== Golf ===
- The Irish Open was won by Ernest Whitcombe (England).

== Births ==
- 11 January – Colm O'Reilly, Bishop of Ardagh and Clonmacnoise (1983–2013).
- 16 January – Willie Walsh, Bishop of Killaloe (1994–2010) (died 2025).
- 9 February – Liam Kavanagh, Labour Party teachta dála (TD) representing Wicklow, Member of the European Parliament.
- 18 February – Ciarán Bourke, singer (died 1988)
- 20 February – Bríd Rodgers, Social Democratic and Labour Party Member of the Legislative Assembly (Northern Ireland) and minister.
- 21 February – Brian Mullooly, Fianna Fáil party politician, twice Cathaoirleach of Seanad Éireann.
- 23 February – Tom Murphy, playwright (died 2018).
- 4 March – Don Davern, Fianna Fáil TD for Tipperary South 1965–1968 (died 1968).
- 6 March – Ronnie Delany, middle-distance runner (died 2026).
- 26 March – Eddie Fullerton, Sinn Féin party councillor (killed by the Ulster Defence Association in 1991).
- 1 April – Billy Whelan, association footballer (died 1958).
- 22 April – Tim Pat Coogan, newspaper editor and historian.
- 25 April – John Boland, Roman Catholic bishop of the Diocese of Savannah, Georgia.
- 5 May – Eddie Linden (born in Scotland), poet and editor (died 2023).
- 12 May – Mary O'Hara, soprano
- 15 May – Barry Desmond, Labour Party TD, cabinet minister and Member of the European Parliament.
- 18 May – Pádraig Ó Snodaigh, Irish language activist, poet, writer and publisher (died 2025).
- 16 June – Peter Rice, structural engineer (died 1992).
- 18 June – Jimmy Brohan, Cork hurler (died 2023).
- July – Arthur Ryan, businessman (died 2019).
- 11 July – Oliver Napier, Northern Irish politician (died 2011)
- 20 July – Hugh Coveney, Fine Gael party TD and cabinet minister, yachtsman (died 1998).
- 4 August – Michael J. Noonan, Fianna Fáil TD and cabinet minister (died 2013).
- 13 August – Brendan Comiskey, Roman Catholic bishop of the Diocese of Ferns (died 2025).
- 4 September – Pauline Bewick, artist (born in England) (died 2022).
- 16 September – Charles McDonald, Fine Gael politician, Cathaoirleach (chair) of Seanad Éireann (Senate) 1981–1982.
- 29 September – Ian Lewis, cricketer (died 2004).
- 16 October – Fred Tiedt, boxer (died 1999).
- 27 November – Johnny Byrne, writer and script editor (died 2008).
- 4 December – Noel Peyton, association football player (died 2023).
- 8 December – Michael Woods, Fianna Fáil TD for Dublin North-East and cabinet minister.
- Full date unknown – Bob Quinn, filmmaker, writer and photographer.

== Deaths ==
- 23 March – Robert Browne, Roman Catholic bishop of the Diocese of Cloyne (born 1844).
- 8 April – Patrick Joseph Sullivan, mayor of Casper, Wyoming and Republican member of the United States Senate for Wyoming (born 1865).
- 17 July – George William Russell (writer's pseudonym "Æ"), critic, poet, essayist, artist and economist (born 1867).
- 22 July – William Mulholland, water service engineer in Southern California (born 1855).
- 9 August – James Buchanan, 1st Baron Woolavington, businessman and philanthropist (born 1849).
- 15 September – Sir Thomas Esmonde, 11th Baronet, peer, member of parliament and senator (born 1862).
- 22 October – Edward Carson, Unionist leader, barrister and judge (born 1854).
