= Cathedral of Saint Mel in Ardagh =

Cathedral of Saint Mel
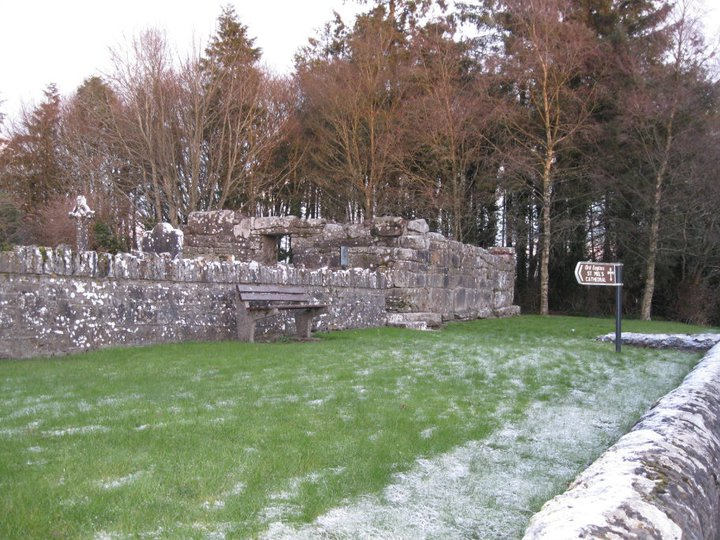
- Cathedral of Saint Mel in Ardagh
- Interactive map of the Cathedral of Saint Mel area

General information
- Coordinates: 53.6683°N 7.69492°W

The Cathedral of Saint Mell is the name given to the ruins of a small, Early Medieval church in the village of Ardagh, County Longford in Ireland, not to be confused with St Mel's Cathedral in the town of Longford. Church reform in the 12th century made Saint Mel's Cathedral in Ardagh the centre of the Diocese of Ardagh and Clonmacnoise, demonstrating the importance of the site as a Cathedral and bishopric see. Although known as Saint Mel's Cathedral, the ruined church dates from three centuries after the saint's death, and predates the introduction of a diocesan system in Ireland.

== History ==
According to tradition, a monastery was founded at Ardagh by St. Patrick, who made his nephew, St. Mél of Ardagh its bishop or abbot. Although there is no historical or archaeological evidence to support such a claim, St. Mel is still generally regarded as the founder of the Diocese of Ardagh and Clonmacnoise. The building was severely damaged in the midst of warfare in A.D. 1496 and was never restored.

== Archaeology ==
The ruins represent a typical Early Medieval church, with a simple rectangular room, accessed via a western lintelled doorway with inclined jambs, tapering from the base to the top. The building measure 10.35m long by 7.70m wide. The large blocks of stone that make up the walls of the ruins sit on a stone plinth, which projects slightly. Some limestone blocks in the wall measure an average of 2.5m by .90m. The roof would have been a high pitched roof, supported somewhat by the antae located at the corners of the ruins. Archaeological excavations took place at this site in 1967, identifying the footprint of a wooden structure, dating to the 8th century AD, almost identical in dimensions to the present footprint of the upstanding stone structure.

== Gallery ==
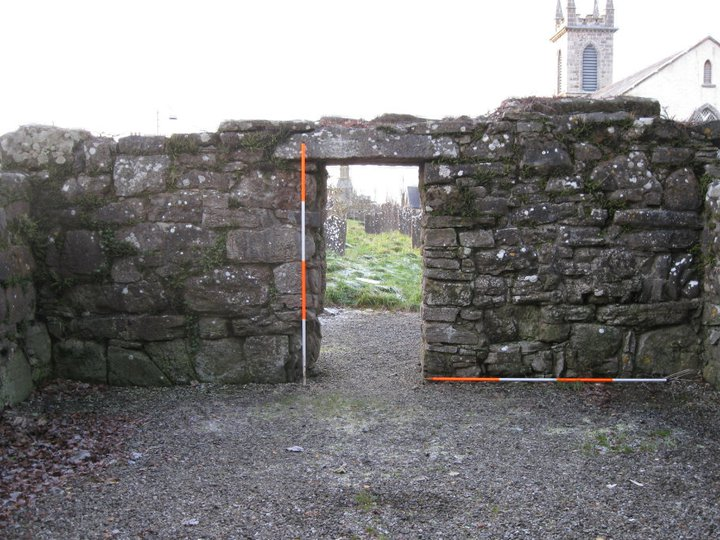

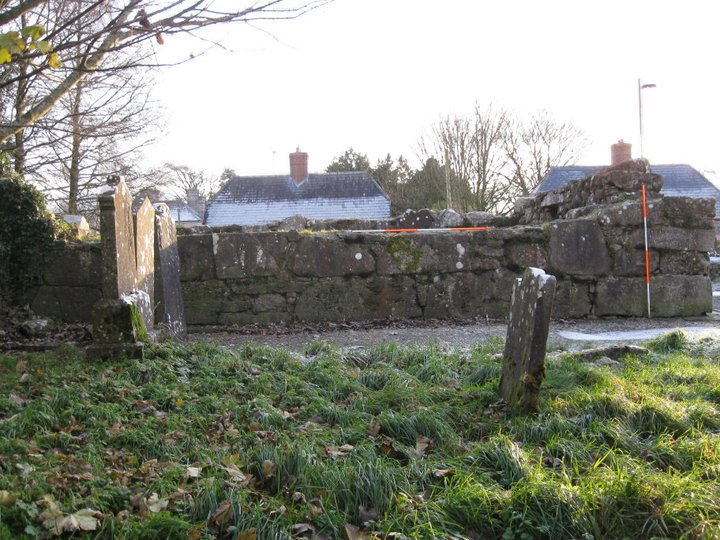

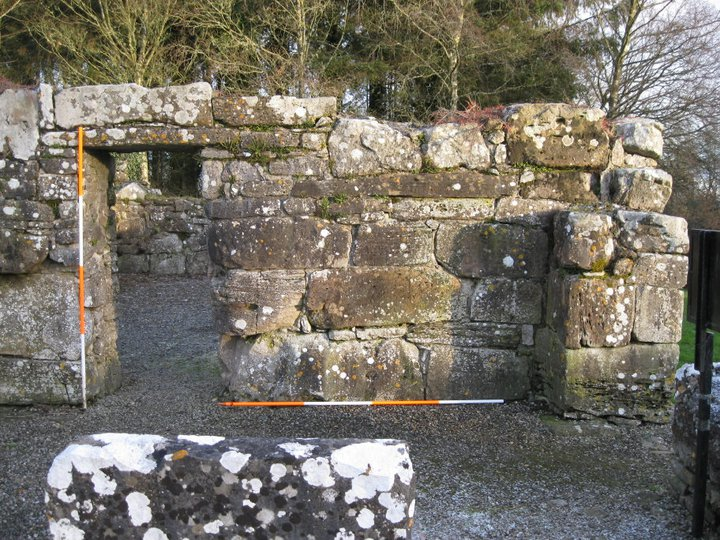

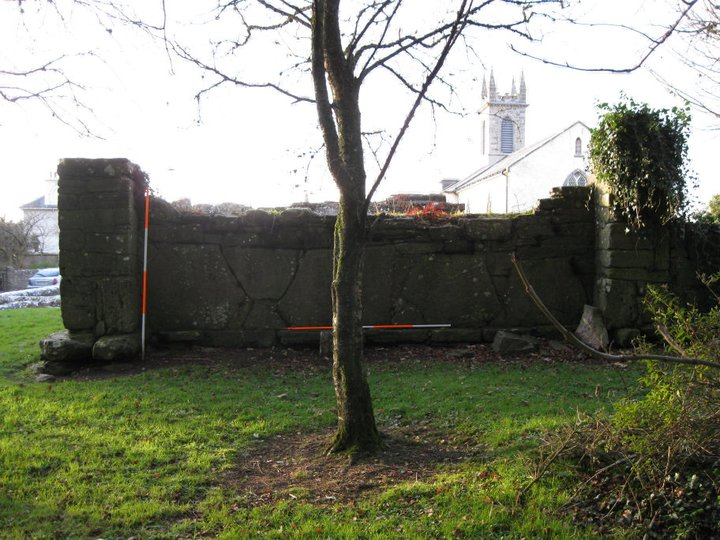

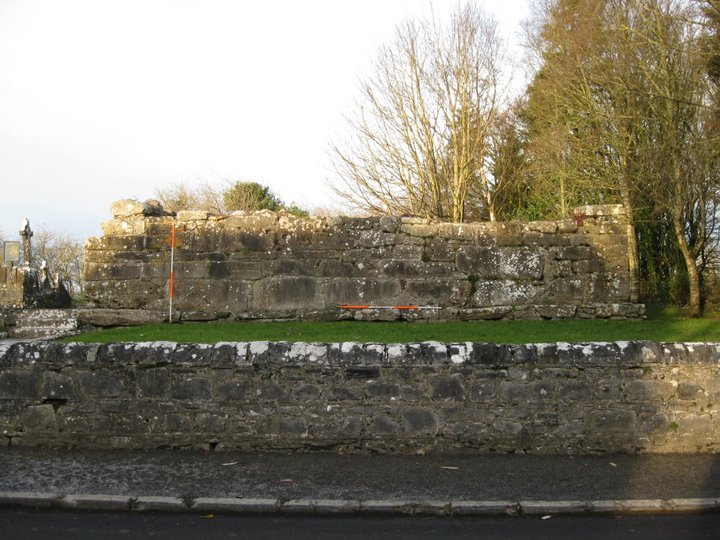

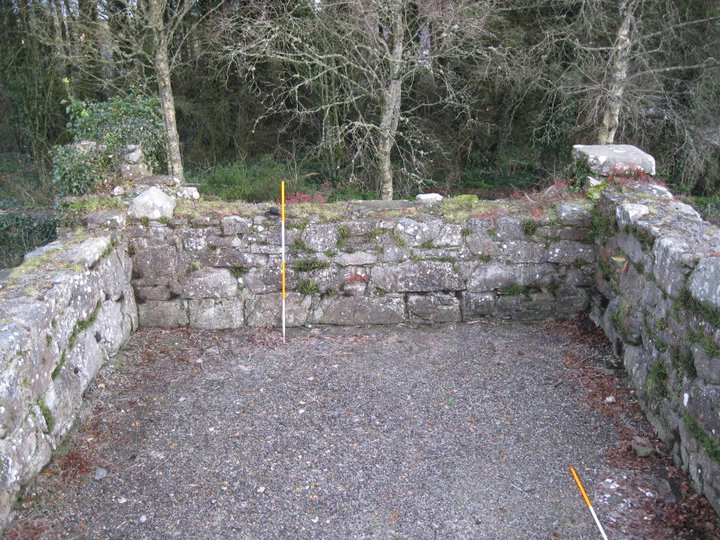

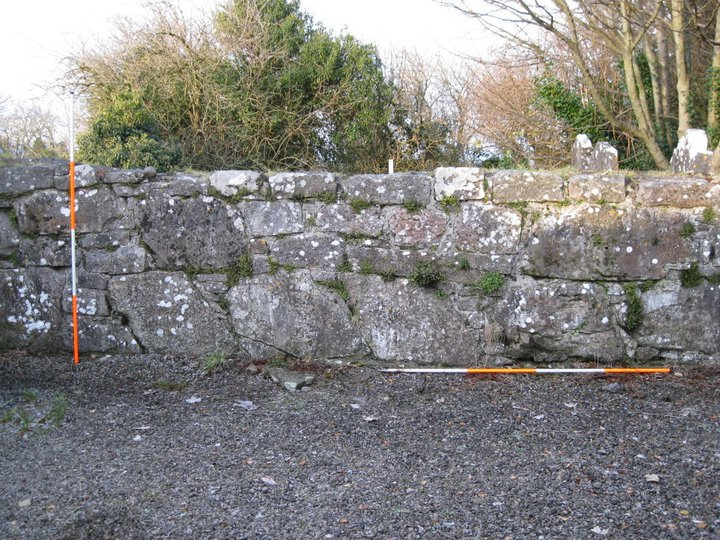
