= James Dillon (bishop) =

Irish bishop

- Bishop of Kilmore
- Church: Catholic Church
- Diocese: Diocese of Kilmore
- In office: 30 August 1800 – 19 August 1806
- Predecessor: Charles O'Reilly
- Successor: Fargal O'Reilly
- Previous posts: Titular Bishop of Nilopolis (1796-1800); Coadjutor Bishop of Raphoe (1796-1800)

Orders
- Consecration: 22 May 1796 by Richard O'Reilly

Personal details
- Born: 1738 Diocese of Armagh, Kingdom of Ireland, British Empire
- Died: 19 August 1806 (aged 67–68) Ballyconnell, County Cavan, United Kingdom of Great Britain and Ireland

James Dillon (1738–1806) was an Irish Roman Catholic Bishop of Kilmore from 1800 to 1806.

== Early life ==
James Dillon was born in the Diocese of Armagh, Ireland, in 1738. His parents were poor and he was small in stature. He studied for the priesthood at the Irish College in Paris. The president of that college, Fr. Charles O'Neill, stated that Dillon "was a model of regularity, piety and industry". He studied Philosophy and Theology and graduated as a Doctor of Divinity from the Sorbonne University of Paris. He remained in France for several years after his ordination, and then in 1776, he returned to Ireland and was one of two candidates for the vacant post of Parish Priest of Armagh at the end of June. In mid-July 1776, the post was given to Father James Crawley, the curate of St. Peter's, Drogheda, County Louth. Dillon was then appointed parish priest of Kilmore (Mullavilly) and Canon of the chapter under the title Prebendary of Ballymore. In 1778, he was appointed Vicar-General of the Armagh Archdiocese and parish priest of Killyman (Dungannon), where he built a church. In 1779, he was a candidate for the vacant bishopric of Down and Connor and also for the Coadjutor bishopric of Armagh. The aforesaid Fr. James Crawley complained about him in early 1779 to the Archbishop of Armagh Anthony Blake but got no joy.

== Raphoe See ==
On 22 May 1796, Dillon was consecrated Bishop of Nilopoli in partibus and Coadjutor of Raphoe by the Archbishop of Armagh, Dr. Richard O'Reilly. The Bishop of Meath, Patrick Joseph Plunkett, in his Visitation Book notes- "22 May 1796. This day I assisted with the Right Rev. Dr. Lennan at the consecration of Dr. Dillon, appointed Coadjutor-Bishop of Raphoe. The consecration was performed by the Most Rev. Dr. Reilly, in the presence of the other bishops of the province, —viz., Drs. M'Davett of Derry; Reilly of Clogher; McGuire of Kilmore, and his coadjutor, Dr. Charles Reilly; Cruise of Ardagh; McMullen of Down and Connor, who held their provincial meeting on Tuesday, 24th of this month". While exercising his office of coadjutor, Dillon lived in Ballyshannon, County Donegal. The Bishop of Raphoe, Anthony Coyle was ageing and was being given a difficult time by a group of factious priests. Dillon sided with this group, which antagonised the majority of the Raphoe clergy. He was also unpopular with them because he was from outside the Diocese.

== Kilmore See ==
When the Bishop of Kilmore Charles O'Reilly died on 5 March 1800, James Dillon was appointed as his successor, to the relief of the Raphoe clergy. He was translated to the See on 10 August 1800. His Episcopal income in 1801 was 140 guineas. Dr. Dillon took up residence at Church Street, Ballyconnell, County Cavan. In the early part of 1801 Dillon submitted a list of Kilmore priests to Lord Castlereagh. The Bishop of Meath, Patrick Joseph Plunkett (1778–1827), in his Visitation Book notes- "9 July 1801. I dined at Rev. Mr. M'Mahon's with the Right Rev. Dr. Dillon, Bishop of Kilmore. 24 August 1802. This day Dr. M'Laughiin was consecrated Bishop of Raphoe by Dr. O'Reilly, the Primate; Drs. Plunket of Meath, and Dillon of Kilmore, assisting consecrators. The other bishops of the province, Dr. Cruise excepted, were present on the occasion. All dined with our Primate after the ceremony. 25 and 26 August 1802. On these two days the provincial meeting of the bishops of the Province of Armagh, interrupted since the year 1797, the year before the rebellion, was held at Drogheda. It was composed of Drs. O'Reilly, Archbishop of Armagh and Primate of all Ireland, Plunket of Meath, Dillon of Kilmore, Murphy of Clogher, M'Mullan of Down and Connor, O'Donnell of Derry, O'Dwyer of Dromore, and M'Laughlin of Raphoe. Uniformity in the observance of Lent was agreed upon; various cases of conscience discussed; letters answered. 23 July 1805. I dined at Mullagh, in the County Cavan, at the house of Rev. Felix M'Cabe, with the Right Rev. Dr. Dillon, of Kilmore". James Dillon was described by his contemporaries as- "The good-natured and mild Dr. Dillon succeeded Dr. O'Reilly at an advanced period in life, at which his exertion of mind, if ever he had been conspicuous for it, was greatly lessened. Unacquainted with his own clergy and perhaps fond of his own ease, he was made the dupe of the panders of adulation and the slave of faction". Bishop Dillon died in Ballyconnell on 19 August 1806. The Gentleman's Magazine 1806, Volume 76, Part 1 gives a list of recent deaths- "At Ballyconnel, the Rev. Dr. Dillon, a Roman Catholic bishop". A local tradition in Ballyconnell states that Bishop Dillon was buried in the graveyard attached to Tomregan Church of Ireland in Church Street but no tombstone survives. James Dillon was succeeded by Bishop Farrell O'Reilly.
