= James Magauran =

The Most Reverend James Magauran, D.D.
- Bishop of Ardagh and Clonmacnoise
- Diocese: Ardagh and Clonmacnoise
- Installed: 1815
- Term ended: 1829
- Predecessor: John Cruise
- Successor: William O'Higgins

Orders
- Consecration: August 1815 (Bishop)

Personal details
- Born: c. 1769/1771 Moneensauran, County Cavan, Ireland
- Died: 3 or 25 June 1829 Ballymahon, County Longford, Ireland
- Denomination: Roman Catholic Church

James Magauran (or Magaurin), D.D., (1769/71–1829) was an Irish cleric who served as the bishop of the Roman Catholic Diocese of Ardagh and Clonmacnoise from 1815 to 1829.

At one point, Magauran was invited to testified before the British Parliament about conditions in Ireland.

== Early life ==
Magauran was born in Moneensauran in County Cavan, Ireland between 1769 and 1771. He belonged to the Magauran family of Glangevlin, County Cavan, of whom many men became priests.

His siblings were:

- Peter Magauran of Moneensauran. King of Glan in 1815.
- Arthur Magauran of Curraghglass,
- Dr. Patrick Magauran, British army doctor
- Elizabeth Magauran, Queen of Glan in 1815
- Miss Magauran

== Priestly career ==
In 1789, Magauran attended the University of Salamanca in Spain.

On his return to Ireland, Magauran was appointed a curate in County Fermanagh. He later became the Priest in charge of the Parish of Oughteragh, Ballinamore.

== Episcopal career ==
After the death of Dr. James Cruise, the bishop of Ardagh and Clonmacnoise, the priests from Ardagh parish voted for Magauran as his successor. Magauran was elected on 6 March 1815 and confirmed by Pope Pius VII on 12 March 1815.

Magauran was known for his common sense, his administrative skills and for his mentoring of young priests. He officiated the 8 a.m. mass every Sunday in Ballymahon.

On one occasion, Magauran compelled Dr. William O'Higgins, a priest just returned from teaching in France, to stand the Concursus at Maynooth College against Dr. Laurence F. Renehan. A few days later, Magauran held a social gathering for his clergy. He entertained the group with an account of how O'Higgins bested Renehan in the debate. "I have never witnessed," said Magauran, "such a display of theological learning."

In 1821, Magauran traveled to Dublin for the visit of King George IV. Magauran and another Irish cleric were presented to the king, who afterwards observed, "They were the two finest-looking ecclesiastics in Great Britain."

On 25 March 1825, Magauran testified to a select committee of the Houses of Parliament, chaired by Lord Palmerston, about conditions in Ireland.

Magauran died on either 3 June or 25 June 1829 at Ballymahon, County Longford. He was interred in the church in that town

== Bibliography ==
- Very Rev.Owen F.Traynor, 'Dr. James Magauran, Bishop of Ardagh, 1815-29' in Breifne Journal, Volume IV, No.15, 1972, 336-44.
