= Bishop of Ardagh and Clonmacnoise =

Catholic episcopal title

- Bishopric

catholic
- Incumbent; Paul Connell

Location
- Ecclesiastical province: Armagh

Information
- First holder: Anthony Blake
- Established: 1756
- Diocese: Ardagh and Clonmacnoise
- Cathedral: St Mel's Cathedral, Longford

The Bishop of Ardagh and Clonmacnoise is the Ordinary of the Roman Catholic Diocese of Ardagh and Clonmacnoise, one of the suffragan dioceses of the Archdiocese of Armagh. The episcopal title takes its name after the town of Ardagh in County Longford and the monastery of Clonmacnoise in County Offaly, Ireland.

The union of the sees of Ardagh and Clonmacnoise, which had been proposed in 1709, was carried into effect following the death of Stephen MacEgan, Bishop of Meath on 30 May 1756, who had been administering the see of Clonmacnoise. Augustine Cheevers, Bishop of Ardagh, was translated to the see of Meath on 7 August 1756, and Anthony Blake was appointed as the first bishop of the united see of Ardagh and Clonmacnoise on 11 August 1756.

== List of bishops ==
List of Bishops of Ardagh and Clonmacnoise
From	Until	Incumbent	Notes
1756	1758	Anthony Blake	Appointed on 11 August 1756. Translated to Armagh on 21 August 1758.
1758	1788	James Brady	Appointed on 21 August 1758. Died in office on 11 January 1788.
1788	1812	John Cruise	Appointed on 10 June and consecrated on 17 August 1788. Died in office on 28 June 1812.
1815	1829	James Magauran	Appointed on 12 March 1815. Died in office on 3 June 1829.
1829	1853	William O'Higgins	Appointed on 2 October and consecrated on 30 November 1829. Died in office on 3 January 1853.
1853	1867	John Kilduff	Appointed on 29 April and consecrated on 29 June 1853. Died in office on 21 June 1867.
1868	1870	Neal McCabe, C.M.	Appointed on 29 November 1867 and consecrated on 2 February 1868. Died in office on 22 July 1870.
1871	1878	George Michael Conroy	Appointed on 19 February and consecrated on 11 April 1871. Died in office on 4 August 1878.
1879	1895	Bartholomew Woodlock	Appointed 4 April and consecrated on 1 June 1879; resigned on 12 February 1895 and given the title in partibus of Bishop of Trapezopolis. Died on 13 December 1902.
1895	1927	Joseph Hoare	Appointed 8 February and consecrated on 19 March 1895. Died in office on 14 April 1927.
1927	1966	James Joseph MacNamee	Appointed on 20 June and consecrated on 31 July 1927. Died in office on 24 April 1966.
1967	1982	Cahal Brendan Daly	Appointed on 26 May and consecrated on 16 July 1967. Translated to Down and Connor on 24 August 1982.
1983	2013	Colm O'Reilly	Appointed on 24 February and consecrated on 10 April 1983. Resigned on 17 July 2013.
2013	2021	Francis Duffy	Appointed on 17 July and consecrated on 6 October 2013. Translated to Tuam on 10 November 2021.
2023	present	Paul Connell	Appointed on 5 April 2023.

== Bibliography ==
- Fryde, E. B.; Greenway, D. E.; Porter, S.; Roy, I., eds. (1986). Handbook of British Chronology (3rd, reprinted 2003 ed.). Cambridge: Cambridge University Press. ISBN 0-521-56350-X.
- Moody, T. W.; Martin, F. X.; Byrne, F. J., eds. (1984). Maps, Genealogies, Lists: A Companion to Irish History, Part II. A New History of Ireland. Vol. IX. Oxford: Oxford University Press. ISBN 0-19-821745-5.
