= Joseph Hoare (bishop of Ardagh and Clonmacnoise) =

Roman-catholic bishop

- Bishop of Ardagh and Clonmacnoise
- Church: Catholic Church
- Diocese: Diocese of Ardagh and Clonmacnoise
- In office: 8 February 1895 – 14 April 1927
- Predecessor: Bartholomew Woodlock
- Successor: James Joseph MacNamee

Orders
- Ordination: 11 June 1867
- Consecration: 19 March 1895 by Michael Logue

Personal details
- Born: 15 March 1842 Ballymahon, County Longford, United Kingdom of Great Britain and Ireland
- Died: 14 April 1927 (aged 85) Longford, County Longford, Irish Free State

Joseph Hoare (born Ballymahon, 15 March 1842 - died Longford, 14 April 1927) was an Irish Roman Catholic bishop.

Hoare was educated at St Patrick's College, Maynooth and ordained priest on 11 June 1867. He was a curate at Templemichael, County Longford then head teacher at St Mel's College, Longford. He was parish priest of Street, County Westmeath from 1881 to 1887; and then of Carrick on Shannon until his appointment as Bishop of Ardagh and Clonmacnoise in 1895. He died in post.

Catholic Church titles
| Preceded by Bartholomew Woodlock | Bishop of Ardagh and Clonmacnoise; 1895–1927 | Succeeded by James Joseph MacNamee |
