= George Michael Conroy =

Theologian

- Bishop of Ardagh and Clonmacnoise
- Church: Catholic Church
- Diocese: Diocese of Ardagh and Clonmacnoise
- In office: 24 February 1871 – 4 August 1878
- Predecessor: Neal McCabe
- Successor: Bartholomew Woodlock
- Other post: Apostolic Delegate to Canada and Newfoundland (1877-1878)

Orders
- Ordination: 6 June 1857 by Costantino Patrizi Naro
- Consecration: 11 April 1871 by Paul Cullen

Personal details
- Born: 30 December 1832 Dundalk, County Louth, United Kingdom of Great Britain and Ireland
- Died: 4 August 1878 (aged 45) St. John's, Newfoundland Colony, British Empire

George M. Conroy (30 December 1832 – 4 August 1878) was an Irish Roman Catholic bishop and theologian.

From Dundalk, County Louth, he was educated in Armagh, before at the age of 17 going to Rome to study for the priesthood, where he was ordained on 6 June 1857. Following ordination, he was appointed to All Hallows College, Dublin where he taught as Professor of Dogma, from 1857 to 1866. In 1866, he was appointed secretary to the Archbishop of Dublin, Cardinal Cullen, whom he had known from his time in Armagh, and Dr. Conroy also began lecturing in Theology in Clonliffe College, he also served as joint editor of the Irish Ecclesiastical Record from its foundation 1864 until 1871, when he was appointed a Bishop. Following his appointment to Ardagh and Clonmacnoise in 1871, Bishop Conroy, continued to support Cardinal Cullens reforms, and implemented the changes from the 1875 Synod of Maynooth.

He served as Bishop of Ardagh and Clonmacnoise from 1871 until his death. Appointed by Pope Pius IX to be the first apostolic delegate to Canada, he went there in 1877. He died on his way back to Europe on 4 August 1878, in St. John's, Newfoundland.

Catholic Church titles
Preceded by Neal McCabe CM	Bishop of Ardagh and Clonmacnoise; 1871–1878	Succeeded by Rev. Dr. Bartholomew Woodlock
