= James Joseph MacNamee =

Roman-catholic bishop

- Bishop of Ardagh and Clonmacnoise
- Church: Catholic Church
- Diocese: Diocese of Ardagh and Clonmacnoise
- In office: 20 June 1927 – 24 April 1966
- Predecessor: Joseph Hoare
- Successor: Cahal Daly

Orders
- Ordination: 17 June 1900 by William Walsh
- Consecration: 31 July 1927 by Patrick O'Donnell

Personal details
- Born: 11 December 1876 Fintona, County Tyrone, United Kingdom of Great Britain and Ireland
- Died: 24 April 1966 (aged 89)
- Education: St Macartan's College; St Patrick's College, Maynooth

James Joseph MacNamee was an Irish Roman Catholic Bishop in the 20th Century.

McNamee was born at Fintona on 11 December 1876. He was educated at St Macartan's College, Monaghan and St Patrick's College, Maynooth. After curacies at Clones and Monaghan he was Administrator of Monaghan then Parish Priest at Clones.

MacNamee was appointed Bishop of Ardagh and Clonmacnoise on 20 June 1927 and consecrated on 31 July that year. He died on 24 April 1966 and was succeeded by Cahal Daly, later Archbishop of Armagh.

Catholic Church titles
| Preceded by Joseph Hoare | Bishop of Ardagh and Clonmacnoise; 1927–1966 | Succeeded by Cahal Daly |
