= Paul Connell =

Irish Roman Catholic prelate (born 1958)

The Most Reverend, Dr. Paul Connell BA BD HDip MA PhD
- Bishop of Ardagh and Clonmacnoise
- Church: Roman Catholic
- Diocese: Ardagh and Clonmacnoise
- Appointed: 5 April 2023
- Installed: 18 June 2023
- Predecessor: Francis Duffy
- Previous posts: Chancellor of the Diocese of Meath; Chaplain at St Mary's Hospital; Executive Secretary of the Council for Education of the Irish Catholic Bishops' Conference; President of the Secretariat for Secondary Schools; President, Principal and Teacher at St Finian's College; Lecturer at Milltown Institute of Theology and Philosophy

Orders
- Ordination: 20 June 1982
- Consecration: 18 June 2023 by Eamon Martin

Personal details
- Born: 27 January 1958 (age 68) Mullingar, County Westmeath, Ireland
- Parents: Thomas Connell; Philomena Begley
- Education: National University of Ireland, Maynooth; St Patrick's College, Maynooth
- Coat of arms

Paul Connell (born 27 January 1958), known as Biggles, is an Irish Roman Catholic priest who was appointed Bishop-elect of Ardagh and Clonmacnoise on 5 April 2023.

== Early life and education ==
Connell was born in Mullingar, County Westmeath, on 27 January 1958, the second of four children to Thomas and Philomena Connell (née Begley). He attended primary school at Scoil Mhuire CBS and secondary school at St Finian's College, completing his Leaving Certificate in 1975.

Connell studied for the priesthood at St Patrick's College, Maynooth, completing a Bachelor of Arts from the National University of Ireland in 1978 and a Bachelor of Divinity from the Pontifical University in 1981. The following year, he was recipient of the Gilmartin prize in ecclesiastical history from St Patrick's College.

Connell was ordained to the priesthood for the Diocese of Meath on 20 June 1982.

== Presbyteral ministry ==
Following ordination, Connell's first pastoral appointment was a brief attachment to Rochfortbridge, before his appointment to the teaching staff at St Finian's College. He subsequently completed a higher diploma in education in 1983. Connell was appointed vice-president of the college in 1989, and subsequently as its president and principal in 1998. During his presidency, the college transitioned from a diocesan all-male boarding school to a co-educational secondary school in 2003, while its boarding school closed in 2007.

He completed a Master of Arts in local history at the National University of Ireland, Maynooth between 1992 and 1994, and was subsequently awarded a doctorate in history by the university in 2002. Connell also lectured part-time in ecclesiastical history at the Milltown Institute of Theology and Philosophy before its closure in 2015, and has published a number of works in the area of local history.

In addition to his presidency at St Finian's College, he served as president of the Secretariat for Secondary Schools between 2013 and 2018.

Following his appointment as executive secretary of the Council for Education of the Irish Catholic Bishops' Conference in October 2018, Connell resigned as principal of St Finian's College in January 2019. He was appointed chancellor of the Diocese of Meath in 2020 and as administrator of Multyfarnham in August 2021.

Connell also served as chaplain to the Cluain Lir community nursing unit at St Mary's Hospital in Mullingar, and gained summer pastoral experience in the United States, ministering at All Saints and St Gabriel's parishes in the Archdiocese of Miami and at St Gregory's parish in the Diocese of San Diego.

== Episcopal ministry ==
Connell was appointed Bishop-elect of Ardagh and Clonmacnoise by Pope Francis on 5 April 2023. In his first address following his appointment, he emphasised the need to not only care and respect others, but also to love and respect the world.

Connell was consecrated by the Archbishop of Armagh and Primate of All Ireland, Eamon Martin, on 18 June at St Mel's Cathedral, Longford.
