= Neal McCabe =

Irish Vincentian priest (1816–1870)

Neal McCabe CM
- Bishop of Ardagh and Clonmacnoise
- Church: Catholic Church
- Diocese: Diocese of Ardagh and Clonmacnoise
- In office: 17 December 1867 – 22 July 1870
- Predecessor: John Kilduff
- Successor: George Michael Conroy

Orders
- Ordination: August 1845 by Daniel Murray
- Consecration: 2 February 1868 by Flavio Chigi

Personal details
- Born: 23 June 1816 Crosdrum (southwest of Oldcastle), County Meath, United Kingdom of Great Britain and Ireland
- Died: 22 July 1870 (aged 54) Marseille, Bouches-du-Rhône, French Empire

Bishop Neale (Note: His first name has sometimes been spelt Nial.) MacCabe CM (23 June 1816 – 22 July 1870), was an Irish Vincentian priest who served as Bishop of Ardagh and Clonmacnoise.

== Early life, family and education ==
MacCabe was from Crosdrum near Oldcastle, County Meath. He was educated in the Vincentian Castleknock College, in Dublin and trained for the priesthood at the Irish College in Paris.

== Career ==
MacCabe served in St. Vincents, Sundays Well, Cork from 1865 to 1866. In 1866, Dr. McCabe was appointed Rector of the Irish College in Paris. In 1867, he was ordained a bishop for Ardagh and Clonmacnois.

== Death ==
Bishop MacCabe died in office on 22 July 1870, after he took ill at Marseille on the way to Civitavecchia, going to the First Vatican Council. His funeral was in the Vincentian Chapel on Rue de Sèvres, Paris and his interment was in a vault of the Head House of Vincentians, in Montparnasse, Paris.

== Notes ==
Catholic Church titles
Preceded by John Kilduff	Bishop of Ardagh and Clonmacnoise; 1868–1870	Succeeded by Rev. Dr. George Michael Conroy
