= Charles O'Reilly (Irish bishop) =

Irish Roman Catholic prelate

- Bishop of Kilmore
- Church: Catholic Church
- Diocese: Diocese of Kilmore
- In office: 23 December 1798 – 6 March 1800
- Predecessor: Denis Maguire
- Successor: James Dillon
- Previous posts: Titular Bishop of Fussala (1793-1798); Coadjutor Bishop of Kilmore (1793-1798)

Personal details
- Born: 1750
- Died: 6 March 1800 (aged 49–50)

Styles of Charles O'Reilly
- Reference style: The Most Reverend
- Spoken style: My Lord
- Religious style: Bishop

Charles O'Reilly (died 1800) was an Irish Roman Catholic prelate who served as the Bishop of Kilmore from 1798 to 1800.

He was appointed the Coadjutor Bishop of the Kilmore and Titular Bishop of Fussala by Pope Pius VI on 17 May 1793. On the death of Denis Maguire, O'Reilly automatically succeeded as the diocesan bishop of Kilmore on 23 December 1798.

Bishop O'Reilly died in office on 6 March 1800.

== Notes ==
Catholic Church titles
Preceded by Denis Maguire	Bishop of Kilmore; 1798–1800	Succeeded by James Dillon
