= William T. O'Higgins =

William T. O'Higgins (1829-1874) was a Catholic chaplain in the American Civil War. He served in the 10th Ohio Infantry.

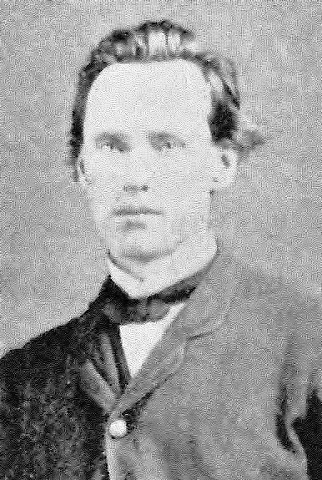
William T. O'Higgins

Born William T. Higgins in 1829 near the border of counties Leitrim and Longford, Ireland, he later took the last name of his uncle (Bishop William O'Higgins (1793-1853)), styled O'Higgins, after the royals. After studying in Maynooth at the Royal College of St. Patrick's, he was sent to British Guiana in the West Indies. He arrived in Philadelphia on May 23, 1857 and joined the Archdiocese of Cincinnati. From 1860 to 1861, he was the assistant to Rev. Richard Gilmour at St. Patrick's in Cincinnati.

After difficulties in Cincinnati, William wrote the Archbishop, John B. Purcell, requesting a position as chaplain; this "remov[ed him from a thorny personnel situation by responding to an obvious wartime need".

He was commissioned as chaplain of the 10th Ohio Infantry on June 3, 1861, in which he served until June 17, 1864.

Following the war, he returned to Cincinnati as a pastor and chaplain, but later left for the Diocese of Little Rock, Arkansas, where he served at the Cathedral of St. Andrew, with a colleague from Ohio, Bishop Edward Fitzgerald. By 1871, he had returned to Ohio, this time to Cleveland, where he taught at St. Mary's Seminary for one term and subsequently served 6 months as pastor of St. Augustine's Church, Cleveland. In 1873 he returned to County Leitrim, Ireland, where he died November 4, 1874.
