= Dony MacManus =

Irish sculptor and educator

Donal "Dony" MacManus (born 1971) is an Irish sculptor and educator.

MacManus graduated with a degree from the National College of Art and Design in Dublin (1995), as well as an Art Teaching Diploma (1998). He worked as a teacher in St. David's, Artane, Dublin. In 1999 he went to New York and studied in New York Academy of Art gaining a Master in Fine Arts (2001). He has a number of sculptures on display in New York and Washington, D.C.

MacManus returned to Ireland in 2004 and founded Irish Academy of Figurative Art, in Ranelagh in Dublin.

In 2011 MacManus co-founded the Sacred Art School, in Florence, Italy. He is also a board member of Newman College Ireland.

== Works ==
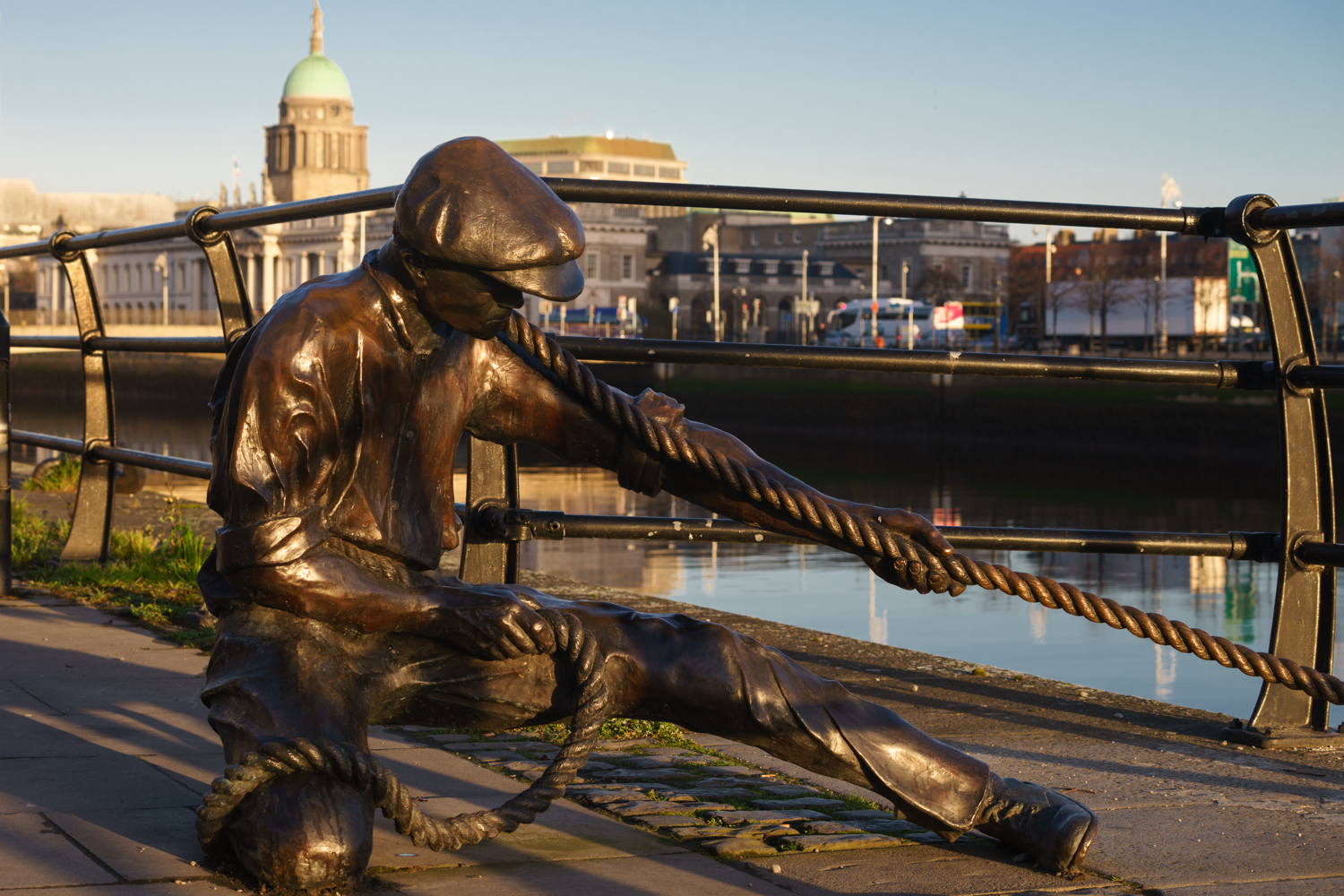
The Linesman (1999) at City quay, Dublin

- The Linesman (1999), Dublin Docklands
- St Josemaría Escrivá (2000), bronze for the Catholic Information Center, Washington, D.C.
- Hobey Baker (2001), cast bronze, St. Paul's School, New Hampshire. U.S.A.
- St Joseph and the Child Jesus (2002), bronze for the Catholic Information Center, Washington, D.C.
- Cardinal Newman (2004), Catholic Information Center, Washington, D.C.
- St Joseph and the Child Jesus (2007) cast bronze, Tallahassee, Florida.
- The Game Piece, originally on N4, moved to Jail Park, Mullingar, Co. Westmeath.
- Theology of the Body Sculpture
- Archbishop Fulton Sheen (2016), Saint Malachy's Roman Catholic Church, New York.
- Bishop William O'Higgins St. Mary's Church, Drumlish, Co. Longford, 2020.
