= Newman College Ireland =

Coordinates: 55.04698°N 7.01068°W

- Coláiste Nuaman Éireann
- Motto: Puritas et Veritas
- Motto in English: Purity and Truth
- Type: Roman Catholic Liberal Arts College
- Active: 2014–2018
- Accreditation: Thomas More College
- Location: Ballykelly, County Londonderry, Northern Ireland

Newman College Ireland was a Catholic liberal arts college in Northern Ireland which was opened in 2014. Named after Cardinal John Henry Newman, the founder of the Catholic University of Ireland which became University College Dublin, the college aimed to create third level institution which embodies the Catholic ethos.

The college was supported by disability rights campaigner and former MEP Kathy Sinnott. Dr. Nicholas Healy was the CEO and served as president of Newman College Ireland. He is a president emeritus of Ave Maria University and a former vice president of Franciscan University of Steubenville . Fundraisers and supporters for the establishment of the college were based in the United States. The economist and UCD Professor Ray Kinsella served as a board member for the college, as did the artist Dony MacManus.

== Curriculum ==
The aim was to be a Catholic college with liberal arts as its primary curriculum and offer courses in theology, history, philosophy, literature, mathematics, economics and natural science. The college pledged to "adhere fully" to Ex Corde Ecclesiae, Blessed John Paul II’s apostolic constitution on Catholic universities.

Newman College commenced its courses in September 2014 accredited by Thomas More College of Liberal Arts in Merrimack, New Hampshire. Lectures in the first year were delivered in Rome, initially in rooms in St. Peter's Basilica, then in the second semester at the Thomas More Campus outside Rome.

The 2015 academic year commenced in September of that year undert the tutelage of Mr. Robert F. Cassidy, STL, who acted as both Director of the Programme, and Student Life Director. He was also a member of the Academic Staff. Courses were based in the Drummond Hotel in Ballykelly, Limavady, County Londonderry, Northern Ireland, thanks to the kindness of Mr. Jim and Mrs. Miraid Peoples. Over 2015 and 2016, during the Marian year, the college ran a course in Mariology. Newman College Ireland was also a sponsor of the Fatima Centenary Conference in 2017.

== Academic staff ==
Among the academic staff of Newman College were Dr. Gaven Kerr (Philosophy), Rev. Dr. Fr. Oliver Treanor (Sacred Scripture), Mr. Robert F. Cassidy, STL (Theology), Maghnus Monaghan (Music), Fr. Thomas Crean OP (Philosophy and Theology), Dr. John Britto (Biblical Theology, Hebrew Psalms), Fr. Dermot Fenlon (History).

== Graduation ==
The first graduation ceremony for the college took place on 28 April 2018. A Graduation Mass took place in St. Finlough’s Church, Ballykelly, celebrated by Cardinal Seán Brady, with a reception in the parish hall. As part of the graduation, the college conferred an honorary degree to Sister Consilio (née Eileen Fitzgerald) the founder of Cuan Mhuire, and presented its Courage in the Public Square award to Katie Ascough - the impeached students' union president of University College Dublin.

== Closure ==
The college did not reopen its doors for the academic year 2018/2019, but sent its remaining students to Thomas More College of Liberal Arts, where they completed their degrees. Their teacher Fr. Thomas Creen, joined them at Thomas Moore College, where he taught and also provided pastoral care to the NCI students.
