= Anthony O'Garvey =

Bishop of Dromore from 1747 to 1763 or 1766

Anthony O’Garvey was the Roman Catholic Bishop of Dromore from 1747 to 1763 or 1766 during the Recusancy in Ireland. He succeeded to a vacant bishopric administered by the Archbishops of Armagh and was succeeded by Bishop Denis Maguire. Bishop O’Garvey feared living openly in Newry and instead lived in the townlands at Aughnagon. The Bishop is recorded as assisting at a 1759 A.D. consecration in the Hibernia Dominicana at page 361.

== See also ==
- Roman Catholic Diocese of Dromore
- List of townlands in County Down

Catholic Church titles
Preceded by vacant	Bishop of Dromore; 1747–1766	Succeeded by Denis Maguire
