= William O'Higgins =

Roman Catholic bishop

William O'Higgins (1794–1853), was an Irish Roman Catholic priest and professor, who served as Bishop of Ardagh and Clonmacnoise, from 1829 until his death in 1853.

O'Higgins taught English and theology in France, the Austrian Empire and Ireland.

== Biography ==
O'Higgins was born in Barragh Beg, Drumlish, County Longford on August 1, 1794, His nephew was William T. O'Higgins who served as a chaplain in the American Civil war.

O'Higgins attended school in Longford and Leitrim. In 1812, he went to Paris to study for the priesthood at the Picpus Seminary. In 1815, O'Higgins assisted in the reopening of the Irish College in Paris, closed since the French Revolution.,

O'Higgins was ordained in 1817 and graduated from the Sorbonne University with an MA in 1818, ranking first in his BD exam. He then held the Chair of English at the Irish College, where he was Professor of Theology. O'Higgins taught at the University of Vienna, before going to Rome. There he earned Maxima cum laude for his Doctorate of Divinity, following the defence of his thesis before the future Pope Gregory XVI. Returning to Ireland O'Higgins taught at Maynooth College, where he held the chair of dogmatic theology.

O'Higgins was elevated to the Ardagh and Clonmacnoise bishopric, following the death of Bishop James Magauran in 1829, O'Higgins served in this post until his own death.

A supporter of Irish Nationalism and Catholic emancipation in Ireland, O'Higgins gaelicised his surname, adding the O in recognition of his friend Daniel O'Connell. In 1840, O'Higgins laid the foundation stone for St Mel's Cathedral, Longford, the cathedral was finished by his successor Rt. Rev. Dr. John Kilduff.

O'Higgins died in 1853.

== Legacy ==
In 2020 a statue of O'Higgins by sculptor Dony MacManus, commissioned by the Bishop William O'Higgins Heritage Project was unveiled outside St. Mary's Church, Drumlish.

Due to the COVID-19 pandemic, the dedication ceremony was delayed until August 28, 2021, by Bishop Francis Duffy.
