= Mél of Ardagh =

5th-century Irish bishop and abbot

Saint Mél of Ardagh
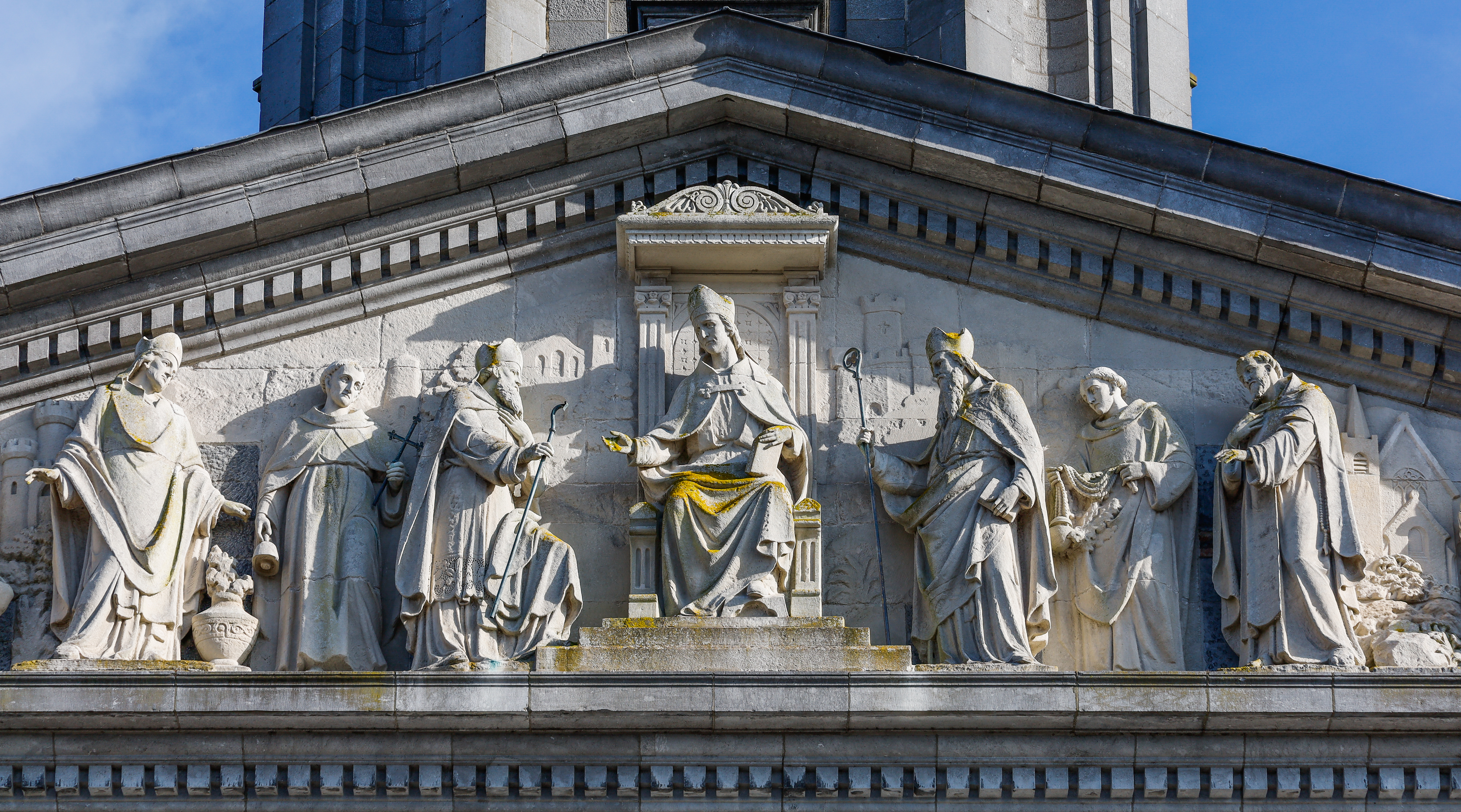
- Pedimental sculpture by George Smyth at St Mel's Cathedral, depicting Mél after his consecration by Saint Patrick
- Died: 488
- Venerated in: Catholic Church; Eastern Orthodox Church
- Feast: 6 February and/or 7 February
- Patronage: Roman Catholic Diocese of Ardagh and Clonmacnoise

Mél of Ardagh, also written Mel or Moel, was a 5th-century saint in Ireland who was a nephew of Saint Patrick. He was the son of Conis (or Chonis) and Patrick's sister, Darerca. Saint Darerca was known as the "mother of saints" because most of her children (seventeen sons and two daughters) entered religious life, many were later recognized as saints, and several of her sons became bishops.

Mél and his brothers Melchu, Munis and Rioch accompanied their uncle Patrick to Ireland and helped him with his missionary work there. Mél and his brother Melchu were both reportedly consecrated bishop by Patrick himself. After Patrick built the church at Ardagh, he appointed Mél as Bishop of Ardagh. According to the Life of St. Brigid, Mél is said to have had no fixed see for most of his life in ministry, which fits with other accounts of his being a travelling missionary and evangelist. Acting upon the apostolic precept, Mél supported himself by working with his hands; what he gained beyond bare necessities, he gave to the poor.

== Life ==
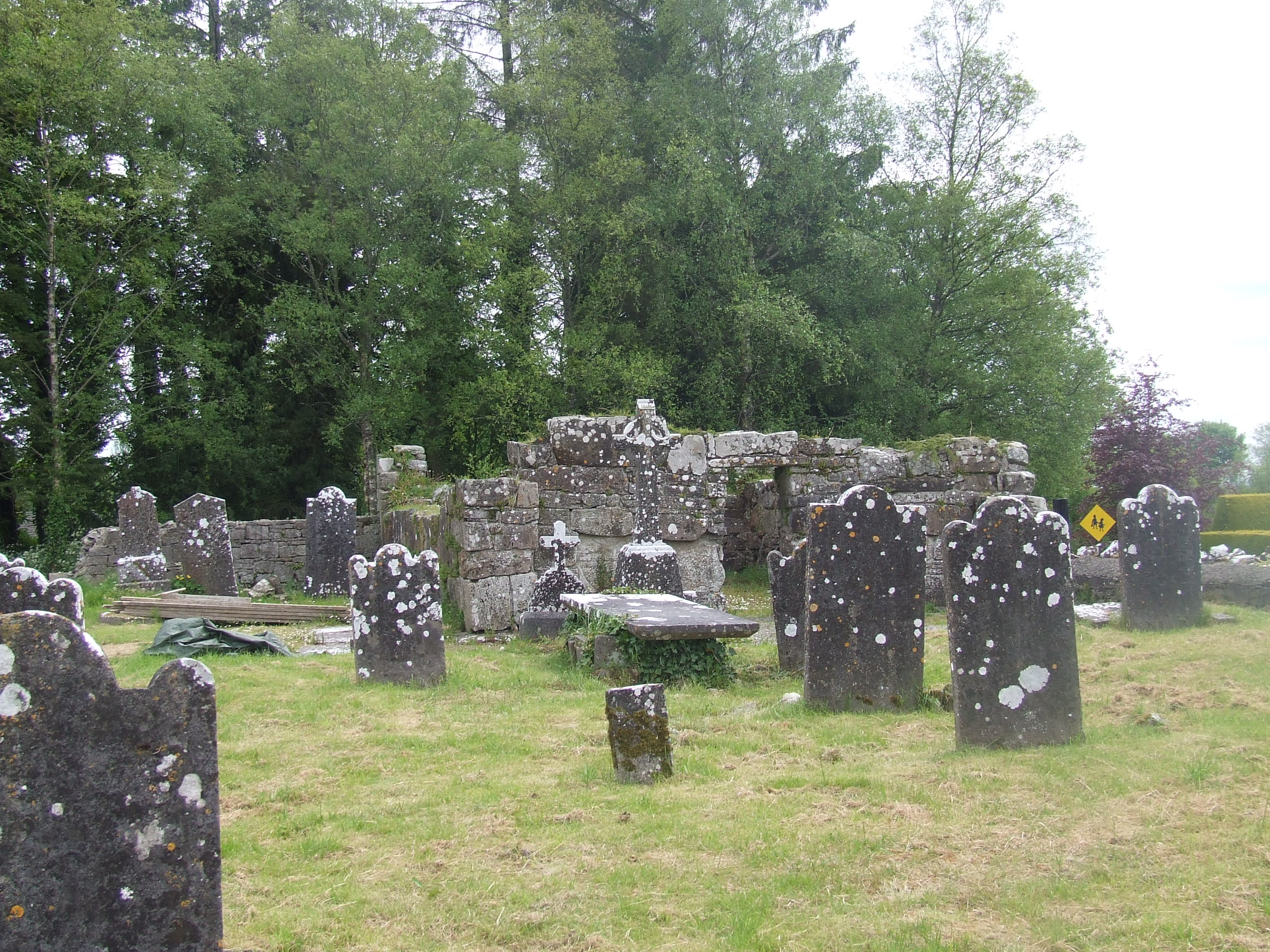
Ruins of the Church of St Mél, Ardagh

Mél helped evangelize Ireland while supporting himself through manual labour. Patrick appointed Mél as one of the earliest Irish bishops and head of the Diocese of Ardagh. Mél also built the monastery of Ardagh where he was both bishop and abbot, and is said to have had the gift of prophecy. He accepted Brigid of Kildare's profession as a nun, and served as her mentor while she was in Ardagh.

Mél lived with his aunt, Lupait, on her farm during a portion of his ministry, and rumour spread that their relationship was of a scandalous nature. Patrick went to investigate. Mél and Lupait both produced miracles to testify to their innocence: Mél ploughed up a live fish in the middle of his field, and Lupait carried hot coals without being burned.

He died in AD 488.

== Veneration ==
There is a lot of confusing and conflicting evidence about the life of Mél, including the possibility that he and Melchu were the same person. Mel has a strong cultus in County Longford where he was the first abbot-bishop of a richly endowed monastery that flourished for centuries. The cathedral at Longford is dedicated to Mél, as is a college. An insular crozier, believed to have belonged to Mél, was found in the 19th century at Ardagh near the old church of St Mél. The crozier is now kept in a darkened bronze reliquary that was once decorated with gilt and coloured stones which was burned in the 2009 fire that destroyed the cathedral. He is the patron saint of the Roman Catholic diocese of Ardagh and Clonmacnois.

Mél's feast day, 7 February, has begun to be observed as a holiday for single people. "Saint Mél's Day" is a chance for singles to celebrate the good things about being single. Traditions include sending yourself a Saint Mél's Day card and for people to host parties for their single friends.
