= Denis Maguire =

Irish Roman Catholic churchman

The Most Reverend Denis Maguire DD
- Bishop of Kilmore
- Diocese: Kilmore
- Installed: 1770
- Term ended: 1798
- Predecessor: Andrew Campbell
- Successor: Charles O'Reilly
- Other post: Bishop of Dromore 1767–1770

Personal details
- Born: 1721 Killesher, County Fermanagh, Ireland
- Died: 23 December 1798 (aged 77) Enniskillen, County Fermanagh, Ireland
- Buried: Church of Saint Molaise graveyard, Devinish Island, Loch Erne, County Fermanagh, Ireland
- Denomination: Roman Catholic Church
- Education: St Anthony's College, Leuven (Old University of Leuven)

Denis Maguire (also known as Dennis or Dionysius Maguire), DD, O.F.M., (1721–1798) was an Irish Roman Catholic churchman who served as Bishop of Dromore from 1767 to 1770 and Bishop of Kilmore 1770 to 1798.

== Early ==
Dr. Maguire was born in 1721 in the parish of Killesher, County Fermanagh, Ireland. His brothers were Bryan, Philip, John and James Maguire. His family was descended from the Maguire chiefs of Fermanagh but were dispossessed of their lands and all they had left was a small farm in Killesher. He studied at Louvain University in Belgium and joined the Franciscan Order of Friars Minor Observants. He was a Guardian of the Order in Rome and Louvain.

== Bishop of Dromore ==
On the recommendation of Cardinal Franz Christoph von Hutten zu Stolzenfels, Bishop of Speyer, Dr. Maguire was appointed as Bishop of Dromore on 10 February 1767, in succession to Bishop Anthony O'Garvey. Sir James Caldwell of Castle Caldwell, County Fermanagh, acted as his referee. Dr.Maguire seems to have been an unhelpful man when appointed Bishop of Dromore, if we are to believe the testimony of Major Edward Magauran who visited the bishop in the Spring of 1767 ("Memoirs of Major M'Gauran", Volume I, Page 134, London 1786). The major was born in Ballymagovern, County Cavan on 16 April 1746, the grandson of Colonel Bryan Magauran, the Chief of the Clan McGovern who fought in the Battle of the Boyne for King James II against William III of Orange. At the time of Dr. Maguire's appointment as Bishop of Dromore, Edward M'Gauran was then serving as an ensign in General Loudon's Austrian Regiment of Foot. He needed his pedigree proved by a respectable witness in Ireland and he states as follows; "My relations being numerous, and dispersed throughout the kingdom, I was several months employed in collecting their attestations, which I found was necessary to have corroborated by the testimony of Dr. Reilly, the Titular Bishop of Kilmore, who was then absent: I applied to Dr. M’Guire, the Catholic Bishop of Dromore, then at the house of Mr. Robert M’Guire of Tempo; He refused to grant me my request, although he knew my pretensions to be just. Exasperated by his duplicity, which was injurious to my purpose and his tenets, I set off, and travelling all night, arrived the next morning at Kilmore, the seat of Dr. Craddock, the Protestant Bishop, who signed my certificate, which was followed by the dignified clergy, and the nobility of the neighbourhood, which I thought an ample indemnification for my recent disappointment". (Major M'Gauran's identification of Dr. Reilly as Titular Bishop of Kilmore is puzzling as Andrew Campbell was bishop at the time. However Campbell was in hiding and living out of the diocese at Dunany, County Louth so it may refer to Rev. Dr. John O'Reilly, parish priest of Crosserlough, County Cavan who was Vicar General of Kilmore at the time. Dr. John Cradock was Protestant Bishop of Kilmore from 11 November 1757 until March 1772. The Maguires of Tempo at whose house the bishop stayed were a Protestant branch of the family. However they remained close to their Catholic cousins as in evidenced by the bishop residing with them and also by the fact that when he was bishop of Kilmore in 1793, Dr. Maguire supported the Protestant Captain Hugh Maguire of Tempo when he attempted to appoint the Catholic clergy of Enniskillen and Tempo in opposition to Bishop Hugh O'Reilly of Clogher. Bishop Maguire's agent in Rome, Fr. James Cowan OFM, Guardian of St.Isidore's College, prepared an appeal in Italian to the Papacy on Hugh Maguire's behalf.).

== Bishop of Kilmore ==
On the death of Bishop Andrew Campbell of Kilmore Diocese on 1 December 1769, Dr. Maguire was translated to Kilmore as bishop by Propaganda on 20 March 1770 and was approved by the Pope on 25 March 1770. His belonging to the Franciscans caused trouble as he was accused of appointing fellow Franciscans to the best parishes in the Diocese. Laurence Taaffe, Canon of Armagh, protested bitterly to Cardinal Antonelli of Propaganda in April 1784 at the conduct of Dr.Maguire. The incumbent priests of the diocese also resented the favours shown to the Franciscans and showed their resentment by killing Maguire's horse and setting fire to his house.

When he succeeded as bishop of Kilmore, the Penal Laws against Catholics had resulted in the three previous bishops of Kilmore being non-residents of the Diocese due to fear of arrest, with the result that Dr.Maguire had a huge task on his hands to restore discipline among the Kilmore clergy and to provide new churches and schools. Up until his appointment the clergy were in hiding and the Catholic churches were converted to Protestant worship. Masses were said at Mass-Rocks or in barns in remote locations.

The churches he caused to be built in Kilmore were Tullaghan (Kinlough) in 1770, Inishmagrath 1770, Laragh 1770, Kilmainhamwood 1775, Cavan 1774, Knocktemple (Castlerahan) 1780, Ballyconnell 1780, Bunnoe 1780, Tierworker 1788, Kildallan 1785, Killeshandra 1790, Ballinagh 1790, Killoughter 1790, Glenade 1790, Kilargue 1791, Corronea reconstructed 1795, Kildoagh 1797 & Derrylin 1797. These were mostly single cell barn churches and the best preserved example is the old disused Holy Trinity church in Kildoagh, Templeport. He also founded four Latin schools in the diocese including Laragh Latin School.

Dr. Maguire tried to keep on the good side of the Protestant Ascendancy. In 1778 he was the chief signatory of an address from 'The Catholics of County Fermanagh', signed by 24 persons to King George III offering support for his war against Revolutionary France.

When the Franciscans vacated Lisgoole Monastery in County Fermanagh, one of their chalices was given to Dr.Maguire. It is a magnificent silver chalice which was presented to the Franciscans by Captain Sir Bryan Maguire in 1739 and bears the Maguire Arms and is inscribed in two consecutive lines on the convex surface of the base as follows; "This chalice was given by Sir Bryan Maguire, Knight of the Noble Order of St.Louis, for the use of ye Convent of Lisgool, in ye County of Fermanagh, near Inniskilling. Anno Domini 1739. Pray for his intention". On the death of Dr. Maguire the chalice passed to his brother Philip Maguire of Enniskillen who died in 1806 and it is now in the parish church of Cloonclare, Manorhamilton, County Leitrim.

An inscribed presentation silver drinking goblet which also belonged to Dr. Maguire is kept in St.Patrick's College, Cavan.

The strain of reorganising the diocese told on Dr. Maguire's health and in 1792 he was given a Coadjutor in the person of Reverend Charles O'Reilly, who was appointed as such with the title of Bishop of Fussala, in partibus, on 17 May 1793.

== Death ==
Dr. Maguire died at Enniskillen, County Fermanagh on 23 December 1798 at the age of 77 and was succeeded as Bishop of Kilmore by Dr. Charles O'Reilly. Dr. Maguire was buried in the cemetery attached to the Church of Saint Molaise on Devinish Island in Loch Erne, County Fermanagh, beside the graves of his brothers Bryan and James Maguire. His gravestone, a massive horizontal slab close to the south wall of the church, is still visible and reads

Erected in memory of the
late Most Rev. Doctor Dennis Maguire
Catholic Bishop of Dromore
Who was translated to Kilmore
Who departed this life on the
23rd day of December in the year of
Our Lord 1798. Aged 77 years.
During which period he lived
a most exemplary life with
indefatigable zeal and charity
to mankind. He was indeed
the Good Shepherd. A true
and real follower of his Master
and a most affectionate and
sincere friend.

Dr. Maguire's portrait hangs on the walls of St. Patrick's College, Cavan.

== Will and Testament ==
Dr. Maguire's will and testament, which is dated 20 May 1798, was proved on 3 January 1799, by his brother and nephew, Philip and Denis Maguire, in the Diocesan Court of Clogher and is kept in the Public Records Office in Dublin. It reads as follows:

In the Name of God. Amen. Being perfectly sound in mind, and tolerably well in body, to guard against a surprise, death being certain and the hour unknown, I make this my last will and testament, and dispose of all my worldly substance in the following manner.

1. I order my body to be interred in Devenish along with those of my brothers Bryan and James; and I order that a decent tombstone, not a very expensive one, be placed over me, and that moderate expense be made at my funeral. No spirituous liquor. N.B.

2. I bequeath to my nephew, Denis, Philip's son, one hundred pounds of the money deposited in Philip's hands; and I likewise leave him one half of the profit rent arising from Mr. James Caldwell's lease of the tenements in town and chapel-park. Note that I am joint leasee in said holding.

3. In case Philip's wife should survive him I leave her six pounds yearly during her natural life, of one hundred pounds in Mr. Jason Hassard's hands in perpetuity; but if she dies before Philip, said six pounds to be the property of my niece Ann, during her life, and, after her death, to my niece Alice Quinlan, and after her demise to young Denis, my grand-nephew. I mean Alice's son.

4. I leave six pounds yearly, the interest of one hundred pounds in the hands of Mr. Jason Hassard in perpetuity to my brother John during his natural life; and after his death to my niece Mary MacHugh, otherwise Maguire, for two years; and after the expiration of the said term, said six pounds to be divided between Bryan Maguire, my nephew, and my grand-nephew, Andy's son; I mean Andy's son John.

5. Should my dear nephew Captain Denis come to the country soon after my demise, I leave him my horses, saddles, etc.

6. I leave all my books, Latin, French & English, in charge of my nephew, Denis, as it may happen that some of my relatives may get a call to the Church, I desire the Lives of the Saints by Alban Butler to be always preserved in the family. Should Mr. Hassard choose at any period to return the two hundred pounds, I order said money to be equally divided amongst the descendants male and female (I mean immediate descendants) of my brothers Bryan and Philip, excluding at the same time Bryan's two sons Hugh and Oliver, and Tery, Philip's son, from any dividend of said money. This is for the present my will: And for the executors to it, I nominate and appoint my brother Philip and my nephew, Denis, his son. Written under my hand this 20th day of May 1798. Denis Maguire R.C. Bp. of Kilmore.

7. Codicil- I order my three mohogony tables, six mohogony chairs and the large pier glass, my property, to be sold by auction and the price given to the poor of the parish of Killasser. Denis Maguire.

Catholic Church titles
Preceded by Anthony O'Garvey	Bishop of Dromore; 1767–1770	Succeeded by Patrick Brady
Preceded by Andrew Campbell	Bishop of Kilmore; 1770–1798	Succeeded by Charles O'Reilly
