= St Mel's Cathedral =

Cathedral in Longford, Ireland

Cathedral Church of St Mel
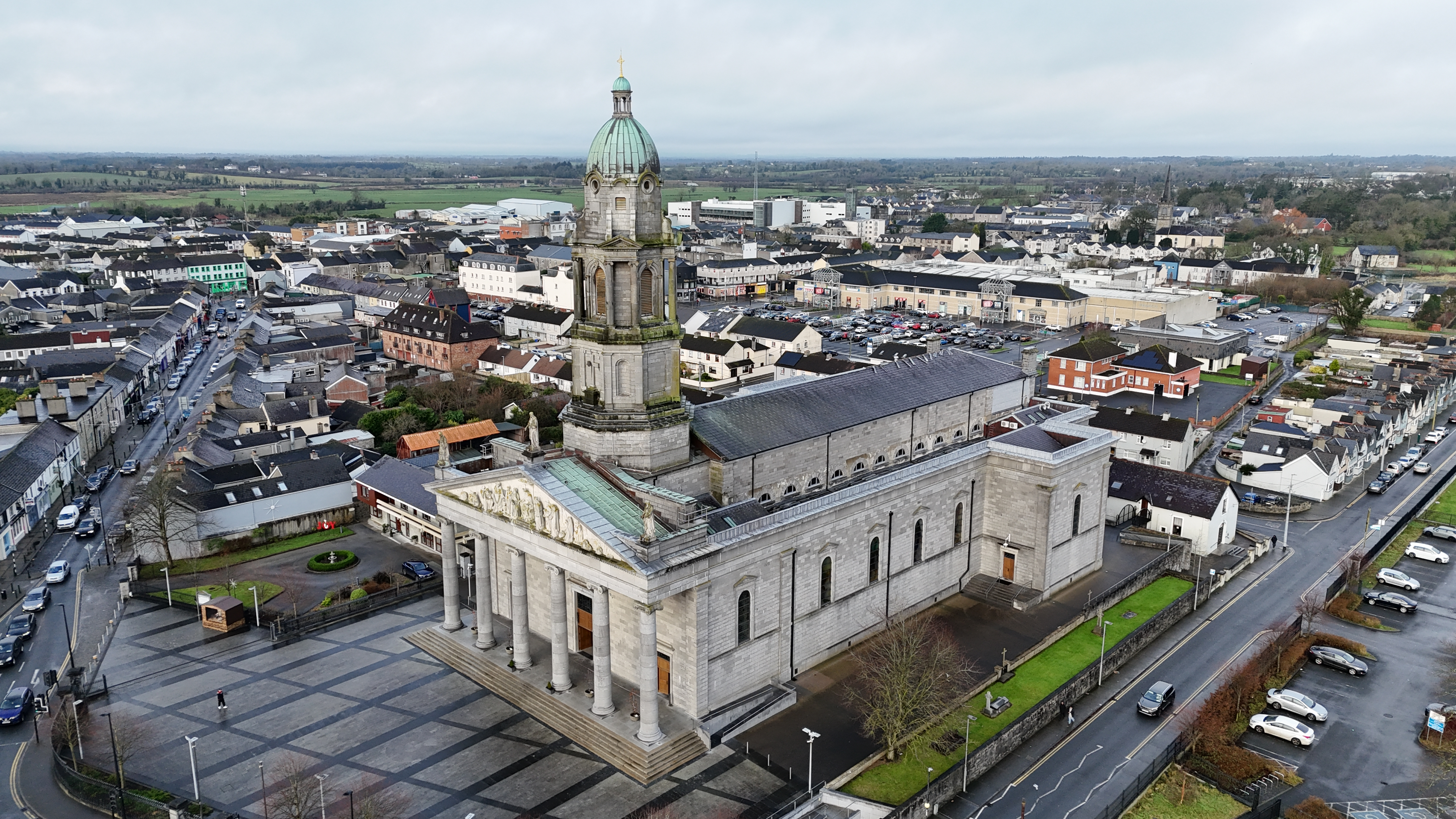
- St Mel's Cathedral in 2024

- Location within Ireland
- 53°43′38″N 7°47′46″W
- Location: Longford
- Country: Ireland
- Denomination: Catholic
- Tradition: Latin Church
- Website: longfordparish.com

History
- Status: Active
- Dedication: Mél of Ardagh
- Consecrated: 19 May 1893

Architecture
- Functional status: Cathedral
- Style: Neoclassical
- Years built: 1840–1856; 170 years ago

Administration
- Province: Armagh
- Diocese: Ardagh and Clonmacnoise
- Parish: Longford

The Cathedral Church of St Mel is the cathedral church of the Roman Catholic Diocese of Ardagh and Clonmacnoise, located in the town of Longford in Ireland. Built between 1840 and 1856, with the belfry and portico as later additions, it has been considered the "flagship cathedral" of the Irish midlands region, Longford's "landmark building" and "one of the finest Catholic churches in Ireland". The cathedral is dedicated to Saint Mél (died 488), who came to Ireland with Saint Patrick and who was ordained bishop at Ardagh, County Longford.

On Christmas Day 2009, the cathedral was destroyed by a fire in the early hours of the morning. The restored cathedral re-opened in December 2014.

== Design history ==
The cathedral is a Neoclassical stone building, at the north-east side of the town. Construction began in 1840 to the design of Joseph B. Keane, with the foundation stone (taken from the ruined cathedral in nearby Ardagh) laid by the Bishop of Ardagh and Clonmacnoise, William O'Higgins, on 19 May 1840. Work was then delayed by the arrival of the Great Famine, but the church was opened for worship by O'Higgins's successor, Rt. Rev. John Kilduff, on 29 September 1856. The roof is supported by 24 limestone columns quarried at nearby Newtowncashel. The 1860 belfry was designed by John Bourke, and the 1889 portico was designed by George Ashlin. The cathedral was finally consecrated on 19 May 1893.

Harry Clarke studios designed the stained glass windows in the transepts. Ray Carroll designed the 1975 furnishings including "The Second Coming" tapestry behind the bishop's throne. Imogen Stuart designed "The Holy Ghost" above the baptismal font. The tapestry was produced by Donegal Carpets of Killybegs.

== 2009 Christmas Day fire ==
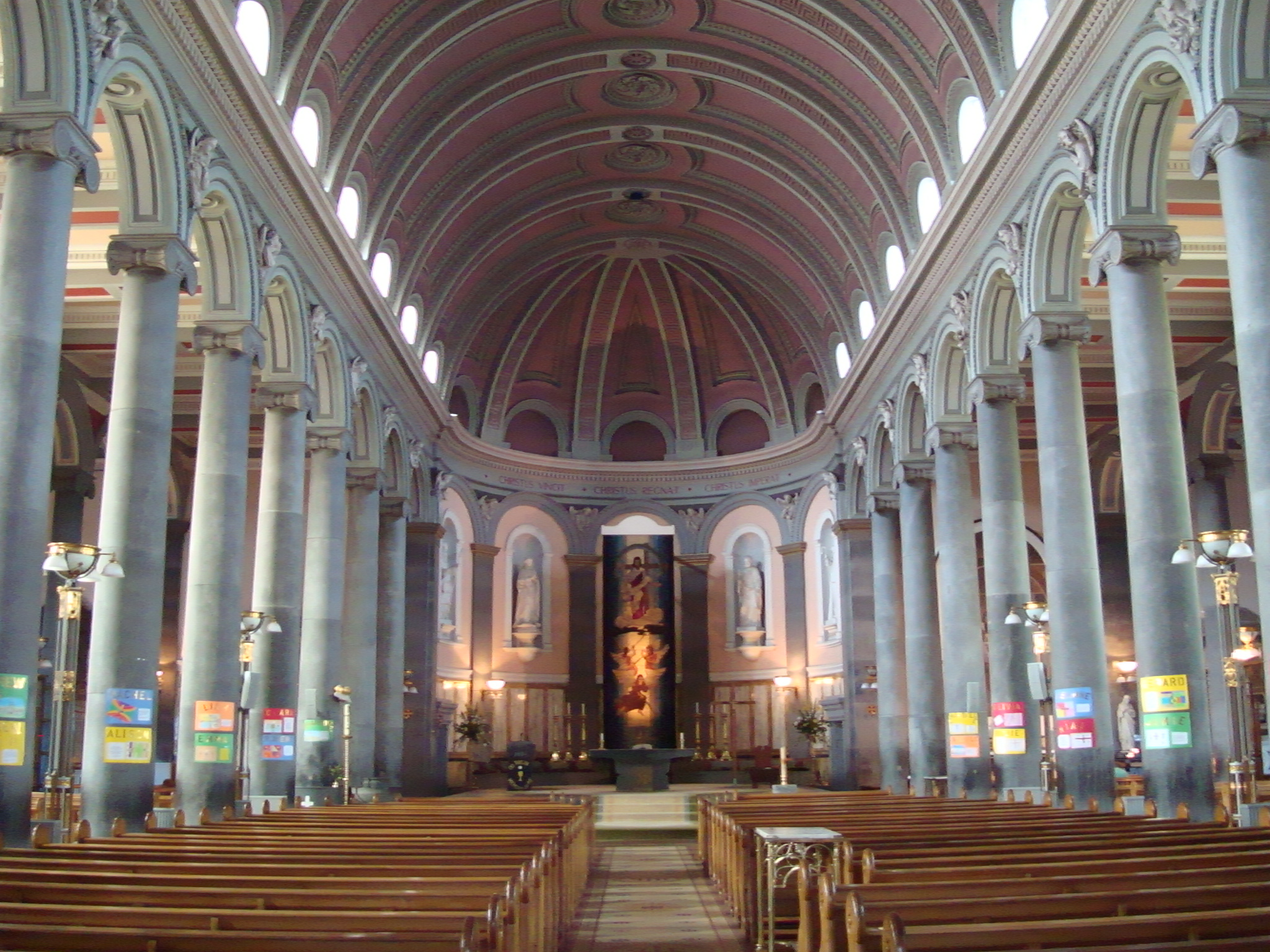
Nave and sanctuary, 2008

Just after 5:00 am on 25 December 2009 a fire began at the back of the building. Freezing weather disrupted attempts by firefighters to put out the blaze as their pipes were frozen solid, causing the fire to go on for several hours. At one point flames were reported jumping 18 m into the air. According to Bishop of Ardagh and Clonmacnoise Colm O'Reilly, who had celebrated Midnight Mass in the building hours before the fire began, St Mel's Cathedral was completely destroyed by the fire, describing the cathedral as "just a shell" and "burned out from end to end". However, there were rescue efforts underway to try to save the campanile before it too was destroyed. As a result of the fire, Longford parishioners held their Christmas Day masses in the local Temperance Hall.

Initial investigations into the cause of the blaze were hampered by the precarious state of the building; the Gardaí conducted house-to-house inquiries in what a spokesman described as a "routine inquiry".

The estimated cost of the damage to the cathedral was approximately €30 million. Bishop O'Reilly committed to rebuilding it. St. Mel's Crozier, a relic dating from over a thousand years ago, was destroyed in the fire.

Gardaí began examining the cathedral on 6 January 2010. They determined two days later that it had not been arson. A comprehensive investigation was undertaken by Gardaí and insurance forensic experts into the cause of the fire. It was established that the outbreak first arose in an old chimney flue at the rear of the cathedral and broke out into the sacristy through old inspection hatches located behind fitted units. It was concluded that the fire was entirely accidental in origin and could not have been foreseen.

Mass moved from the Temperance Hall to the sports hall and chapel of St Mel's College while the cathedral was being restored. Bishop O'Reilly issued a letter to his 41 parishes: "I am now writing the kind of letter that I never dreamt I would need to write. I must do so, since I wear a ring that Cardinal Tomás Ó Fiaich placed on my finger as a reminder that for my time as Bishop I am bound to the Diocesan family in a bond that, like marriage, is for good times and bad. I write this letter to acknowledge that we must stay together in this time of sorrow and bewilderment. I also write to bring some solace to the many who are quite truly heart-broken."

=== Restoration ===
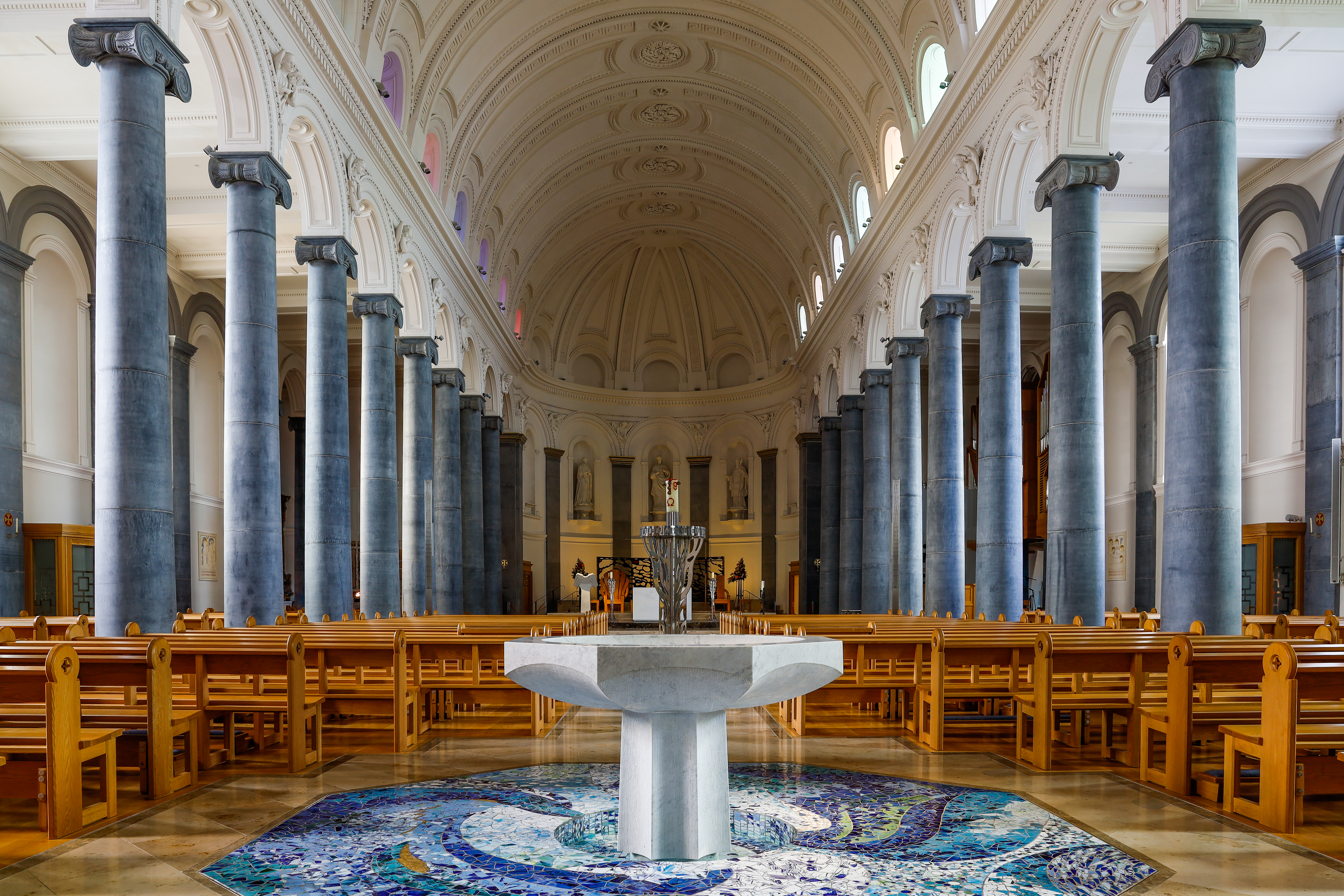
Nave with the baptismal font at its entrance after the restoration

On 18 September 2011 the cathedral ruins were opened to the public for the first time since the Christmas Day fire, with thousands of people showing up to view the cathedral.

In 2012 Fine Gael TD James Bannon asked Bishop Colm O'Reilly to reconsider selecting an Italian organ maker to rebuild the organ in the cathedral.

A new altar was consecrated in March 2014, and the cathedral re-opened on Christmas Eve 2014. The restoration project cost €30 million. Among the features of the restored cathedral are a Carrara marble altar sculpted by Tom Glendon, a silver tabernacle created by Imogen Stuart and Vicki Donovan, a pipe organ consisting of 2,307 pipes, built by Fratelli Ruffatti, and stained glass windows designed by Kim en Joong, a Dominican priest.

== In popular culture ==
A silhouette image of St Mel's Cathedral features on the crest of League of Ireland club Longford Town. The cathedral is also depicted on the crest of all Co Longford GAA teams.

== Gallery ==
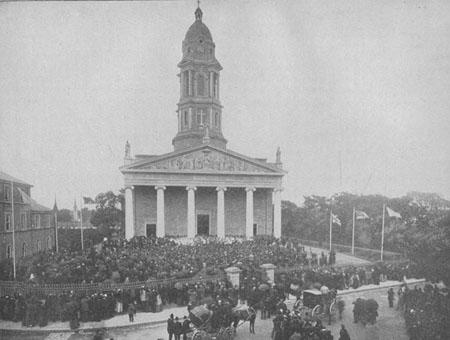
The cathedral in the early 20th century

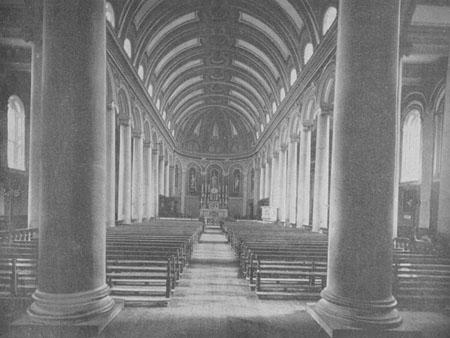
Interior of the cathedral in the late 19th century
