= Colm O'Reilly =

Irish Catholic bishop (born 1935)

The Most Reverend Colm O'Reilly
- Bishop-emeritus of Ardagh and Clonmacnoise
- Church: Roman Catholic Church
- Archdiocese: Armagh
- Diocese: Ardagh and Clonmacnoise
- Appointed: 10 April 1983
- Term ended: 17 July 2013
- Predecessor: Cahal Daly
- Successor: Francis Duffy

Orders
- Ordination: 19 June 1960 (priest)
- Consecration: 10 April 1983 (bishop)

Personal details
- Born: 11 January 1935 (age 91) Colmcille, County Longford, Ireland
- Denomination: Catholic Church
- Parents: John and Alicia O'Reilly

Colm O'Reilly (born 11 January 1935) is an Irish prelate of the Catholic Church. He served as the Bishop of Ardagh and Clonmacnoise from 1983 to 2013.

== Early life and education ==
The youngest of seven children, O'Reilly was born to John and Alicia O'Reilly in Colmcille, County Longford.

His eldest brother, Peter (died 1988), was superior general of St. Patrick's Missionary Society for sixteen years, and another brother, Brendan (died 2000), was a member of the Divine Word Missionaries. He studied at St. Mel's College in Longford, and was ordained a priest on 19 June 1960. in Maynooth.

He spent his priesthood in parishes in the Diocese of Ardagh and Clonmacnoise, ministering first in Granard for nine years. In 1969 he was appointed curate and later administrator at St. Mel's Cathedral.

== Episcopal ministry ==
On 24 February 1983, O'Reilly was appointed Bishop of Ardagh and Clonmacnois by Pope John Paul II. He received his episcopal consecration on the following 10 April 1983 from Cardinal Tomás Ó Fiaich, with Archbishop Gaetano Alibrandi and Bishop Cahal Daly as co-consecrators.

Widely seen as pastorally sensitive and displaying an empathy for people given his parish as opposed to academic experience he generally adopted a low-profile approach to his episcopal ministry but did some wider work within the Irish Bishops Conference. He was Chairman of the Commission for the Missions and of the Liaison Committee for Child Protection; and a member of the Conference Department of Social Issues and International Affairs, Committee for Family and Children, Commission for Justice and Social Affairs, and Trócaire.

In 2009 he was greatly shocked by the fire at St Mel's Cathedral with which he had such a long association and O'Reilly spearheaded the campaign to rebuild and restore the fire ravaged building.

A 2011 audit into the diocese's handling of child sex abuse allegations stated that Bishop O'Reilly "displays a gentle caring approach but with great wisdom and honesty," and further that he along with the diocese's designated person in the area of child safeguarding, "ensures that allegations are addressed in full."

== Resignation ==
On 17 July 2013, Bishop O'Reilly's resignation from the pastoral government of the Diocese of Ardagh and Clonmacnoise was accepted by Pope Francis, in accordance with the 1983 Code of Canon Law.

In 2018, it was alleged by Richard McDonnell, former boyfriend of Ann Lovett, that, following Lovett's death, O'Reilly had a local priest bring McDonnell to Longford for a meeting. Once there, O'Reilly allegedly made McDonnell tell him everything that he had told the local police, before making him kiss his ring and swear to never to tell the story again. O'Reilly denied the allegations.

Catholic Church titles
Preceded by Cahal Daly	Bishop of Ardagh and Clonmacnoise; 1983 – 2013	Succeeded by Francis Duffy
