= 1935 Sectarian rioting across Ireland =

In the summer of 1935, Sectarian rioting occurred first in Northern Ireland and then in the Irish Free State. Following violent riots in Belfast after Orange Order parades on the Twelfth, similar tensions sparked actions across most of the Irish Free State.

== Mid-July 1935: The Belfast Riots ==
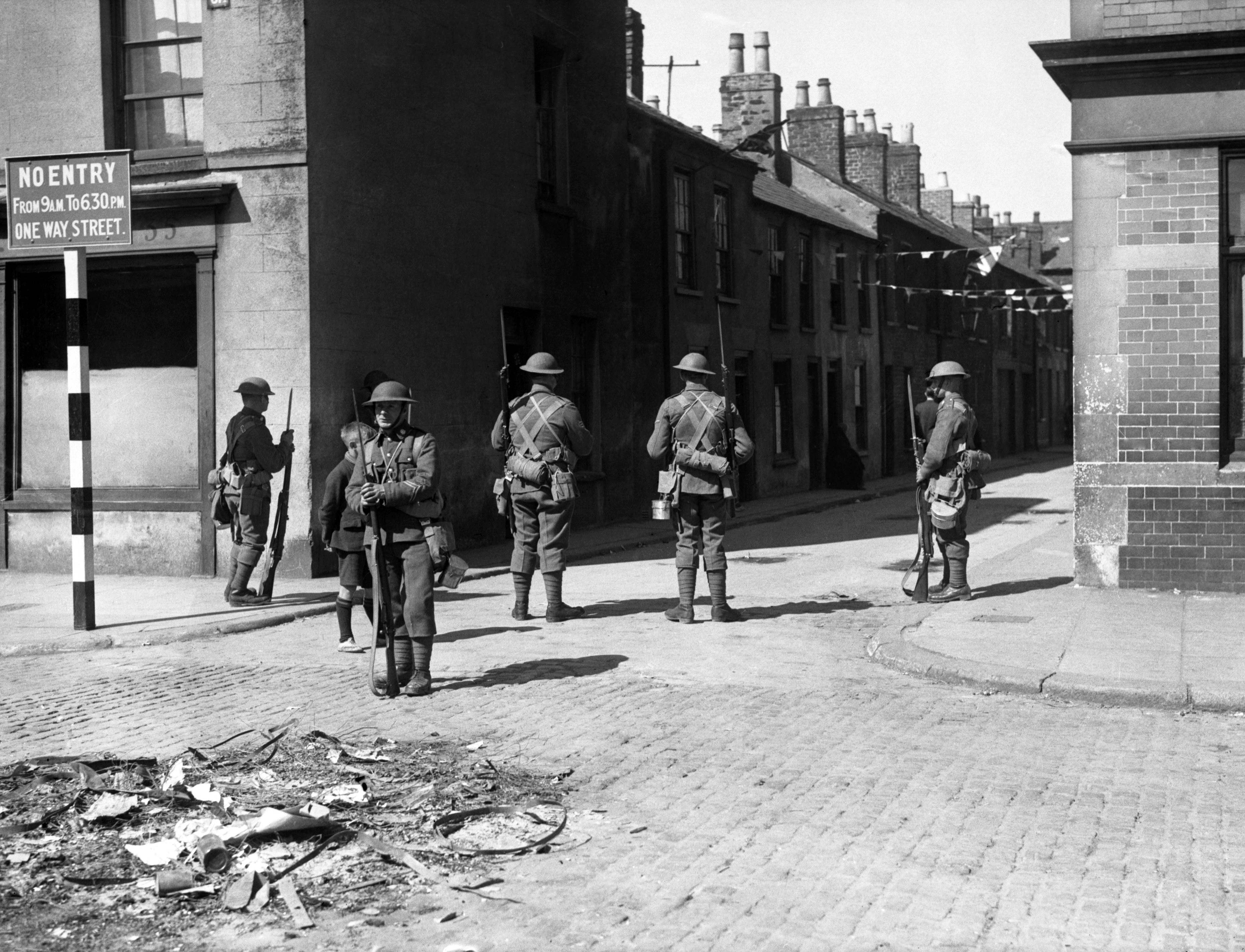
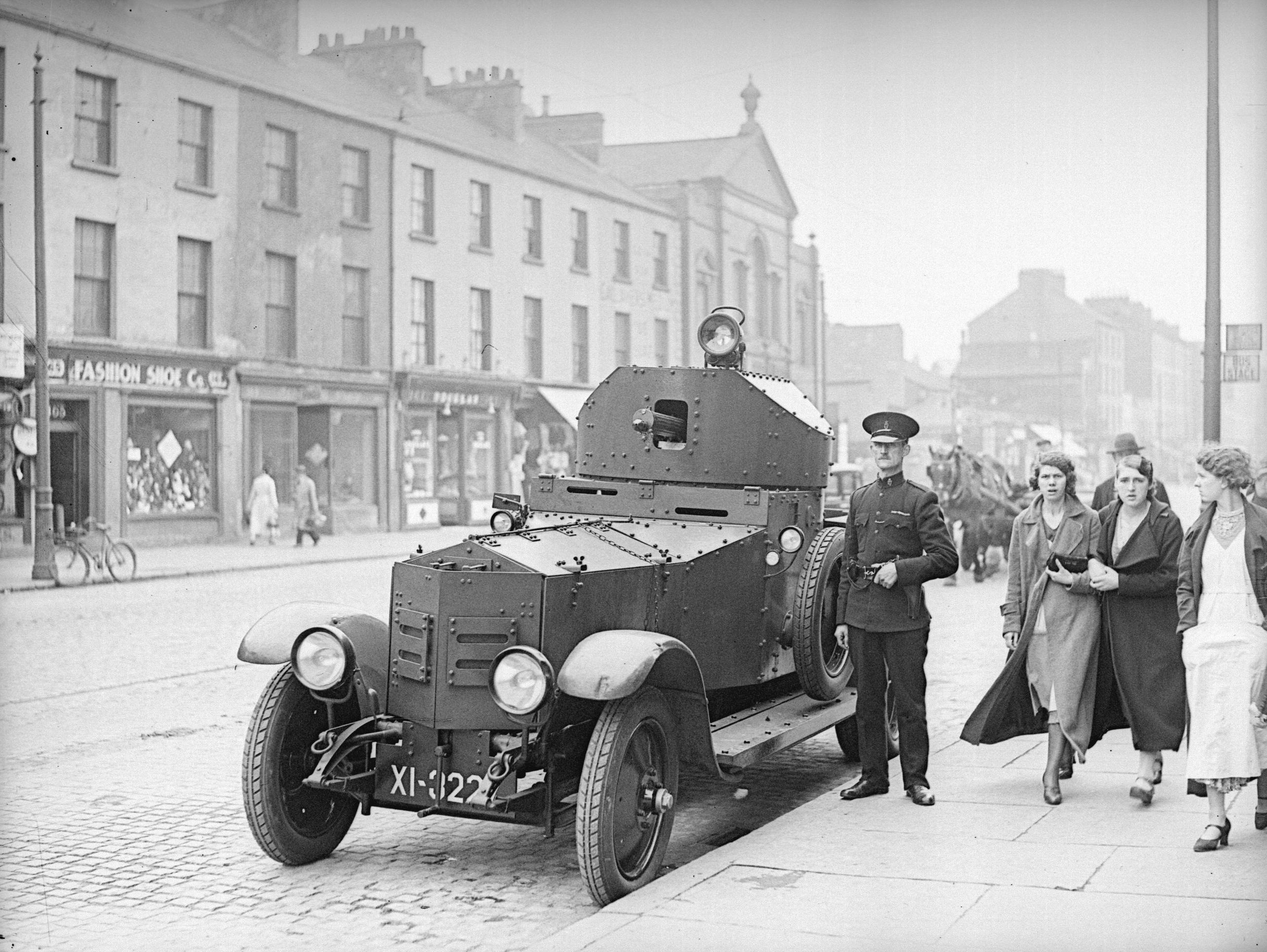
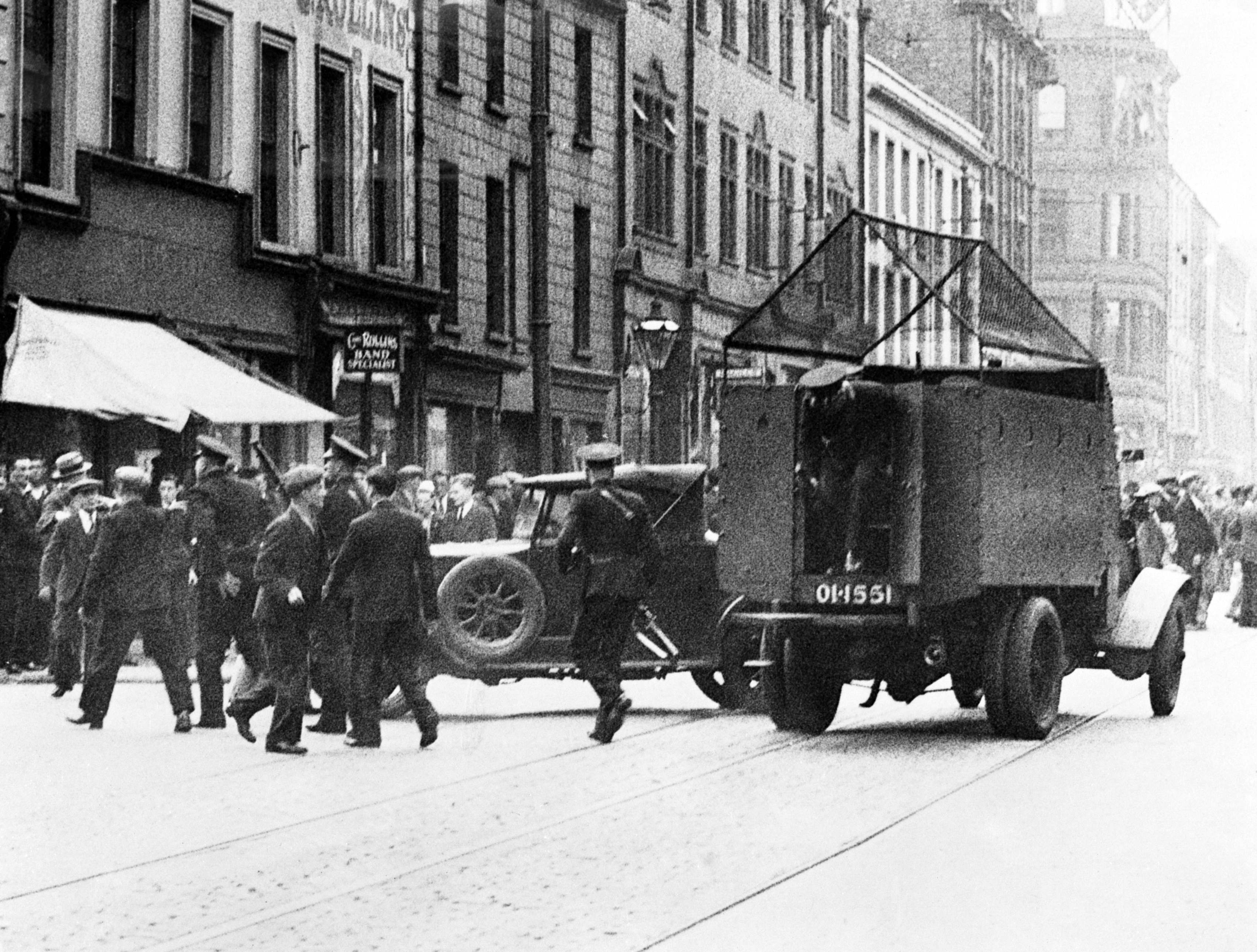
Belfast in July 1935 in the aftermath of the Riots. British troops were deployed to patrol the streets.

In July 1935, Belfast was gripped by some of the worst sectarian violence since the early 1920s, following months of rising tension and the approach of the annual Orange Order parades. The Northern Ireland Minister for Home Affairs, Dawson Bates, initially attempted to defuse tensions by banning all parades in the city. However, he rescinded the ban within four days after pressure from the Belfast Grand Master of the Orangemen, who made it clear that demonstrations would proceed regardless of official restrictions. On 12 July, an estimated 30,000 to 40,000 Orangemen marched through the city, accompanied by bands playing what Prime Minister Lord Craigavon described as “the inspiring sound of the Orange flute and the big drum”.

Though the day itself passed with relative calm, the days that followed saw serious rioting erupt, particularly in the York Street and North Queen Street area, which descended into what the Manchester Guardian described as “something in the nature of a reign of terror”. Armed clashes broke out between Protestant loyalists and Catholic nationalists, including gun battles and rooftop sniping. British troops were deployed, and armoured cars patrolled key areas in an attempt to restore order.

Tram services along York Street continued to operate, but passengers were forced to crouch on the floor to avoid sniper fire. By 21 July, nearly 2,000 people, the vast majority of them Catholic, had been driven from their homes, often with their possessions burned in the streets. In total, eleven people were killed (seven Protestants and three Catholics) with at least 83 others seriously injured. While Protestants accounted for the majority of fatalities, Catholics made up 86% of those injured and displaced. The violence provoked widespread outrage in the Irish Free State, where it was interpreted as a sectarian onslaught against the Catholic minority in Northern Ireland, prompting calls for solidarity and retaliatory action.

== 20-21 July: Rioting in Limerick ==
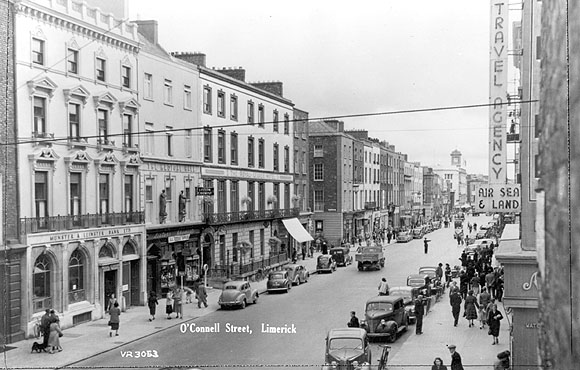
O'Connell Street, Limerick in the 1930s

On the night of 20 July 1935, Limerick city experienced a significant riot that began with the arrest of Joseph Gibbons, a sign-writer employed by the Great Southern Railways. Gibbons, reportedly intoxicated and injured, had smashed a window of a hardware shop on Upper William Street. When Gardaí arrived at his residence to arrest him, a crowd gathered, and the situation quickly escalated. At its height, the disturbance involved up to 600 people.

Initially centred around opposition to the Gardaí and acts of vandalism, the unrest soon spread as groups of rioters splintered off and launched attacks across the city. Businesses were looted, streets were littered with stones and broken timber, and police officers faced sustained resistance, prompting multiple baton charges. The Gardaí, unable to control the disorder, requested military assistance. Soldiers from Sarsfield Barracks were deployed with fixed bayonets and established cordons, eventually restoring order around 2am. Only five individuals were arrested on the night, though 20 people were later charged.

The riot took a distinctly sectarian turn. Protestant-owned properties were deliberately targeted, including the Baptist Church, Mission Hall, Masonic Club, and the homes of Protestant clergy and residents. Rioters reportedly shouted that they would not “leave a Protestant house standing.” Gardaí were deployed to protect Protestant suburbs from further attack.

Condemnation of the Limerick riot was widespread. Local Catholic clergy denounced it as un-Christian and akin to Orange Order sectarianism. The Irish Independent and Irish Times also criticised the violence; the latter argued Limerick was echoing Belfast's sectarianism.

== Anti-Protestant wave across the Free State ==
From mid-July to early August, at least 19 of the 26 counties in the Irish Free State saw sporadic reprisals. These included incidents of arson and vandalism, such as the burning of the Letterkenny motor depot in County Donegal, the torching of an Anglican church in Kilmallock, the gutting of Masonic and gospel halls in Clones, County Monaghan, and attacks on a Methodist church in Boyle, a Masonic hall in Kells, and cottages in County Cavan. In addition, there were incidents of rifle fire at farmers’ homes in County Tipperary, a shotgun being fired at a bank in Listowel, and threatening graffiti, such as "Remember Belfast" and "Boycott Orangemen," being daubed from Ballina in County Mayo to Ballybay in County Monaghan. Anonymous notes, some of which claimed Irish Republican Army backing, warned Protestants to leave the Free State, although Gardaí judged many of these to be fabrications or opportunistic.

In response, the Free State government ordered extra Garda protection for Protestant property and denounced the incidents as "un-Irish crimes". Minister for Finance Seán MacEntee promised strong penalties and new powers if necessary. Gardaí were instructed to protect Protestant communities and moved swiftly to investigate and arrest some of those responsible. The swift condemnation from journalists and clergy, alongside rapid Garda investigations, helped prevent any sustained campaign.

== 22-24 July: Galway’s wildcat strike ==
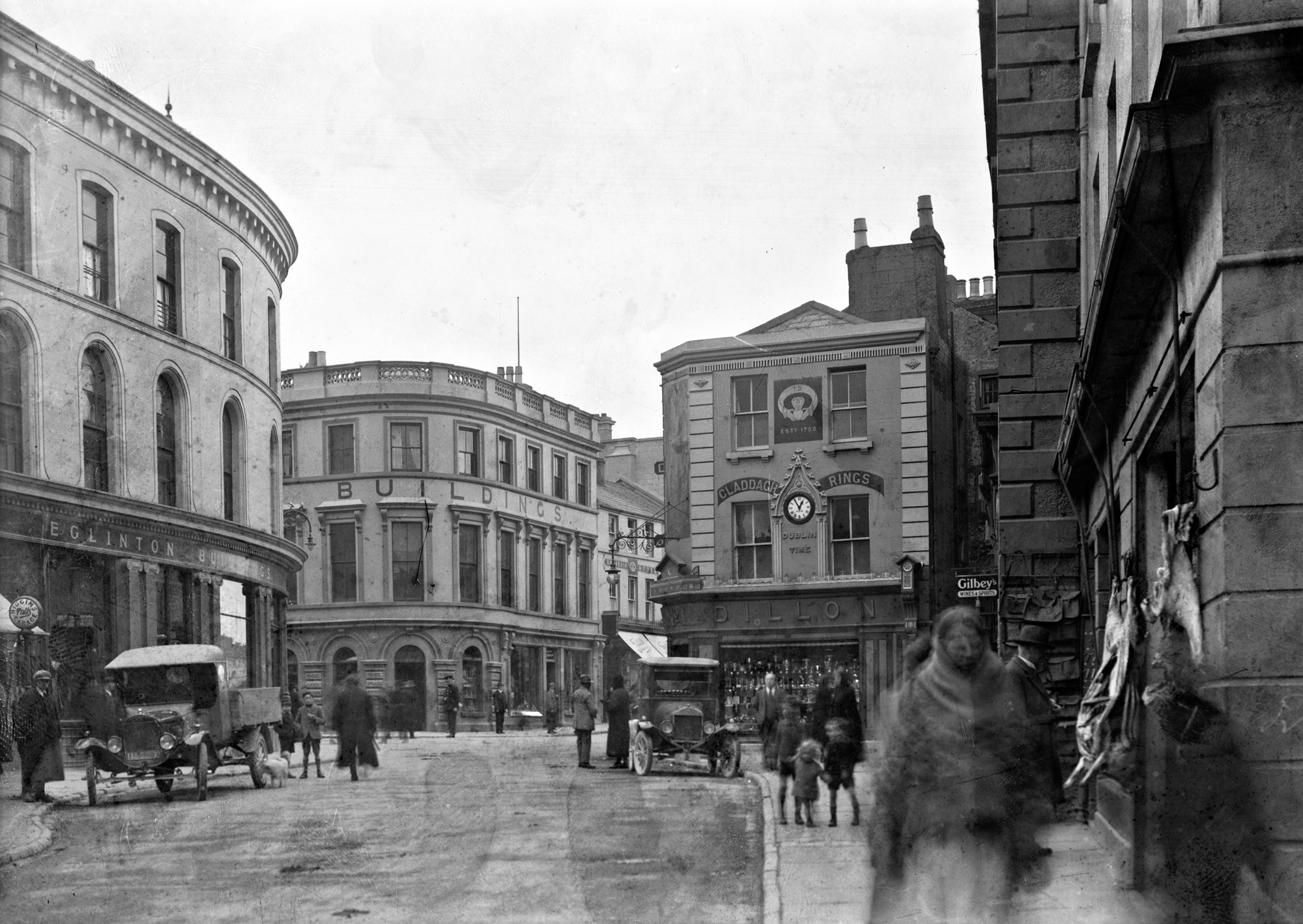
Galway, circa 1930s

In July 1935, an unofficial wildcat strike broke out in Galway, led by local officials of the Amalgamated Transport and General Workers Union (ATGWU), William Carrick and John Healy (both also Labour politicians). On 22 July, dockers in Galway refused to unload the S.S. Comber, a Belfast-owned vessel, and its ensign was removed and burnt. That evening, Carrick and Healy addressed a rally in Eyre Square, calling for a general strike and the removal of "every Orangeman" from Galway. The crowd, accompanied by a band and men on horseback, marched through the town and ended with a gathering at the Comber, which had been placed under Garda protection.

On 23 July, the wildcat strike spread across the city. Dockers visited various workplaces, including foundries, laundries, and factories, and urged Catholic workers to down tools. Over 50 women workers at the Connacht Laundry joined the action. At one site, a Protestant man who refused to strike was publicly jeered by Healy using explicitly sectarian language. Gardaí clashed with marchers near the Electricity Supply Board station after workers there declined to participate.

Although no Protestant-owned property was attacked, the rhetoric used by strike leaders was openly anti-Protestant. Gardaí from outside the city were deployed to manage the situation. Healy criticised the state's defence of Protestant workers and condemned Catholic Gardaí for allegedly using force against Catholic strikers. Tensions heightened further after a rumour spread of a bomb being placed outside a Protestant church, which turned out to be a tar-filled box.

While the wider strike collapsed rapidly, the women at the Connacht Laundry continued their strike into August. Their grievance shifted toward demanding the dismissal of their manager, Miss Hannan, a Protestant whom they accused of workplace abuse. Her religion, however, contributed to the demands for her removal. The Goodbody family, Quaker proprietors of the laundry, refused to dismiss her. The laundry ultimately closed, and a public advertisement was issued seeking new staff.

The strike was condemned by left-wing organisations such as the Republican Congress and the Communist Party of Ireland, which accused the organisers of sectarian agitation. The ATGWU's Dublin office disavowed any connection to the strike, noting its unofficial nature. Despite the overtly sectarian language, no physical violence was directed at Protestants, and some Protestant-owned businesses were passed over peacefully.
