= Noel Peyton =

Irish footballer (1935–2023)

Personal information
- Date of birth: 4 December 1935
- Place of birth: Dublin, Ireland
- Date of death: 26 December 2023 (aged 88)
- Position: Inside left

Senior career*
Years	Team	Apps	(Gls)
1952–1958	Shamrock Rovers	79	(24)
1958–1963	Leeds United	105	(17)
1963–1965	York City	37	(4)
1965–1967	Barnstaple Town		

International career
1956–1957	League of Ireland XI	5	(1)
1956–1963	Republic of Ireland	6	(0)
1957	Republic of Ireland B	1	(0)
- * Club domestic league appearances and goals

Noel Peyton (4 December 1935 – 26 December 2023) was an Irish professional footballer who played as an inside left for Shamrock Rovers, Leeds United and York City, and for the Republic of Ireland national team.

== Club career ==
Peyton made a scoring debut for Shamrock Rovers in October 1953 in a 4–2 win in the League of Ireland Shield. He made two appearances in European competition while at Shamrock Rovers, and in January 1958, moved to Leeds United for a £5,000 fee. Peyton spent five seasons at Leeds, a period when the club was relegated to the Second Division at the end of the 1959–60 season and fought a battle against relegation to the Third Division during the 1961–62 season. He scored 20 goals in 117 appearances for Leeds before joining York City for £4,000 in July 1963, where he made 37 appearances, scoring four goals, during the 1963–64 season.

== International career ==
Peyton played six times for the Republic of Ireland, once while at Shamrock Rovers. He also won a Republic of Ireland B cap against Romania in 1957 and played six times for the League of Ireland XI.

== Personal life and death ==
Peyton's brother Willie was also a footballer who played for St Patrick's Athletic.

Peyton died on 26 December 2023, at the age of 88.

== Honours ==
Shamrock Rovers

- League of Ireland: 1953–54, 1956–57
- FAI Cup: 1955, 1956
- League of Ireland Shield: 1954–55, 1955–56, 1956–57
- Leinster Senior Cup: 1956, 1957
- Dublin City Cup: 1956–57

== Sources ==
- Doolan, Paul; Goggins, Robert (1993). The Hoops: A History of Shamrock Rovers. Dublin: Gill & Macmillan. ISBN 978-0-7171-2121-2.
- Mourant, Andrew (1992). Leeds United: Player by Player. Guinness Publishing Ltd. p. 17. ISBN 0-85112-568-9.
