= Richard O'Reilly =

Irish prelate

- Archbishop of Armagh; Primate of All Ireland
- Church: Catholic Church
- Archdiocese: Archdiocese of Armagh
- In office: 29 November 1787 – 31 January 1818
- Predecessor: Anthony Blake
- Successor: Patrick Curtis
- Previous posts: Coadjutor Archbishop of Armagh (1782-1787); Titular Bishop of Oropus (1781-1787); Coadjutor Bishop of Kildare and Leighlin (1781-1782)

Orders
- Ordination: 25 March 1770
- Consecration: by John Carpenter

Personal details
- Born: 1746
- Died: 31 January 1818 (aged 71–72)

Styles of Richard O'Reilly
- Reference style: The Most Reverend
- Spoken style: Your Grace or Archbishop

Richard O'Reilly (1746–1818) was an Irish prelate of the Roman Catholic Church. He served as the Archbishop of Armagh and Primate of All Ireland from 1787 to 1818.

== Biography ==
After his education at the Propaganda College in Rome, he was the Parish Priest of Kilcock and Vicar General of Kildare and Leighlin. He was appointed the Titular Bishop of Oropus and Coadjutor of Kildare and Leighlin on 20 June 1781. The following year, he was appointed the Coadjutor and Administrator of the Metropolitan see of Armagh on 26 February 1782. On the death of Archbishop Anthony Blake of Armagh on 11 November 1787, O'Reilly automatically succeeded as archbishop and primate.

He died in office on 31 January 1818, aged 72, and was buried in Drogheda.

== Bibliography ==
- Brady, W. Maziere (1876). The Episcopal Succession in England, Scotland and Ireland, A.D. 1400 to 1875. Vol. 1. Rome: Tipografia Della Pace.
- Fryde, E. B.; Greenway, D. E.; Porter, S.; Roy, I., eds. (1986). Handbook of British Chronology (3rd, reprinted 2003 ed.). Cambridge: Cambridge University Press. ISBN 0-521-56350-X.

Catholic Church titles
Preceded by Anthony Blake	Archbishop of Armagh and Primate of All Ireland; 1787–1818	Succeeded by Patrick Curtis
