= Anthony Blake (bishop) =

Irish prelate

- Archbishop of Armagh; Primate of All Ireland
- Church: Catholic Church
- Archdiocese: Archdiocese of Armagh
- In office: 21 April 1758 – 29 November 1787
- Predecessor: Michael O'Reilly
- Successor: Richard O'Reilly
- Previous posts: Administrator of Clonmacnoise (1756-1758); Bishop of Ardagh and Clonmacnoise (1756-1758)

Personal details
- Born: c. 1704 Doonmacreena (east of Irishtown), County Mayo, Kingdom of Ireland, English Empire
- Died: 29 November 1787 (aged 82–83)

Styles of Anthony Blake
- Reference style: The Most Reverend
- Spoken style: Your Grace or Archbishop

Anthony Blake (c. 1704–1787) was an Irish prelate of the Roman Catholic Church. He served as Bishop of Ardagh and Clonmacnoise from 1756 to 1758 and Archbishop of Armagh from 1758 to 1787.

== Biography ==
Blake was the younger of two sons of Andrew Blake of Kilvine, County Mayo. His family were one of the Tribes of Galway; notable members of his family included James "Spanish" Blake, John Blake (mayor), and John Henry Blake.

He was a granduncle of Walter Blake Kirwan and Anthony Richard Blake.

Blake returned to Ireland from France about 1731, having been educated at Saint-Omer and Louvain. He was appointed priest in the archdiocese of Tuam, holding the posts of dean of the chapter and vicar general to the archbishop. From 1741 to 1756, he served as Warden of Galway. He erected a new parish chapel, which stood until 1833, in the town's middle street.

Catholic Church titles
| Preceded by Michael O'Reilly | Archbishop of Armagh and Primate of All Ireland; 1758-1787 | Succeeded by Richard O'Reilly |
