= Fussala =

Roman town in Numidia, later a Catholic bishopric

Fussala was a town in the Roman province of Numidia that became a Christian bishopric. The town and bishopric disappeared after the Muslim conquest of the Maghreb, but the bishopric has been revived as a titular see of the Catholic Church,

== Situation ==
Fussala was a fortified town situated forty miles from Saint Augustine's Hippo Regius. The fortress of Fussala completed the defences of Hippo.

== First bishop ==
In about 416, Augustine of Hippo appointed as Catholic bishop of Fussala, then inhabited for the most part by Donatists, a young man named Antoninus, who robbed the people there and was removed. Antoninus insisted on being restored to Fussala, even appealing to the Apostolic See, but was resolutely opposed by the faithful of the see. In a long letter of his, Augustine recounts the series of problems that Antoninus had caused. Neil B. McLynn gives a more sympathetic presentation of the case of Antoninus.

== Later bishops ==
A certain Melior is known to have been bishop in 484. The see still existed in the 7th century.
