= Ardagh, County Longford =

Village in County Longford, Ireland

Ardagh Ardach
- Village
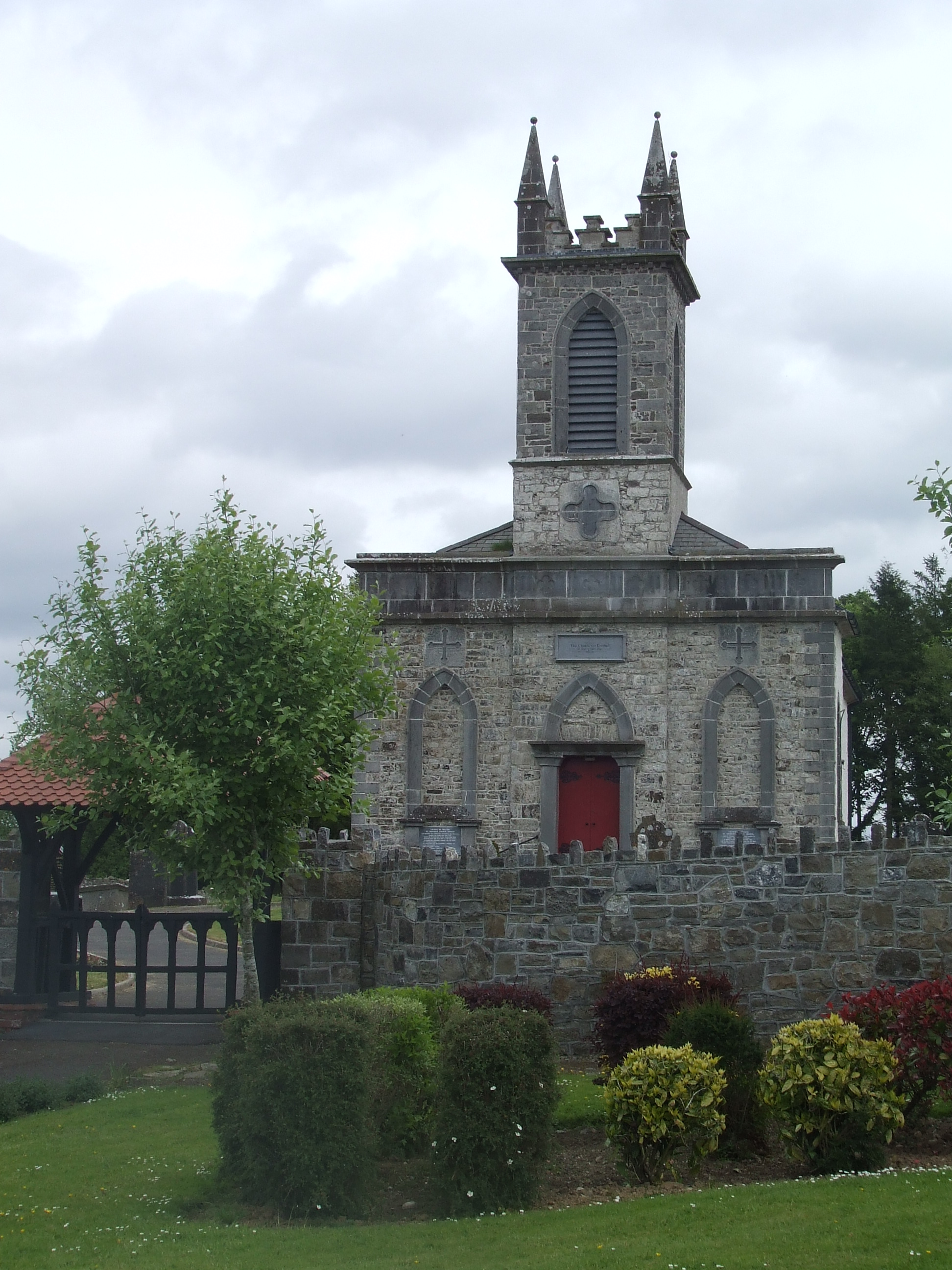
- Western elevation and lychgate of St Patrick's (Church of Ireland) church in Ardagh

- Location of Ardagh within the Republic of Ireland
- Coordinates: 53°40′1″N 7°41′36″W
- Country: Ireland
- Province: Leinster
- County: County Longford

Population
  - Estimate (2008): 200
- Irish grid reference: N199687

Ardagh (Irish: Ardach, older version Irish: Ardachadh, meaning 'high field') is a village in County Longford, Ireland. Ardagh is located towards the south of County Longford, 10 kilometres (6.2 mi) southwest of Longford town, located off the N4 road. Originally a site of pre-Christian worship, Ardagh became a site of Christian settlement with the arrival of Saint Patrick sometime between 434 and 435. The bulk of the village was laid-out in the mid-19th century. The barony of Ardagh is named for the village. There is also a civil parish of the same name.

== History ==
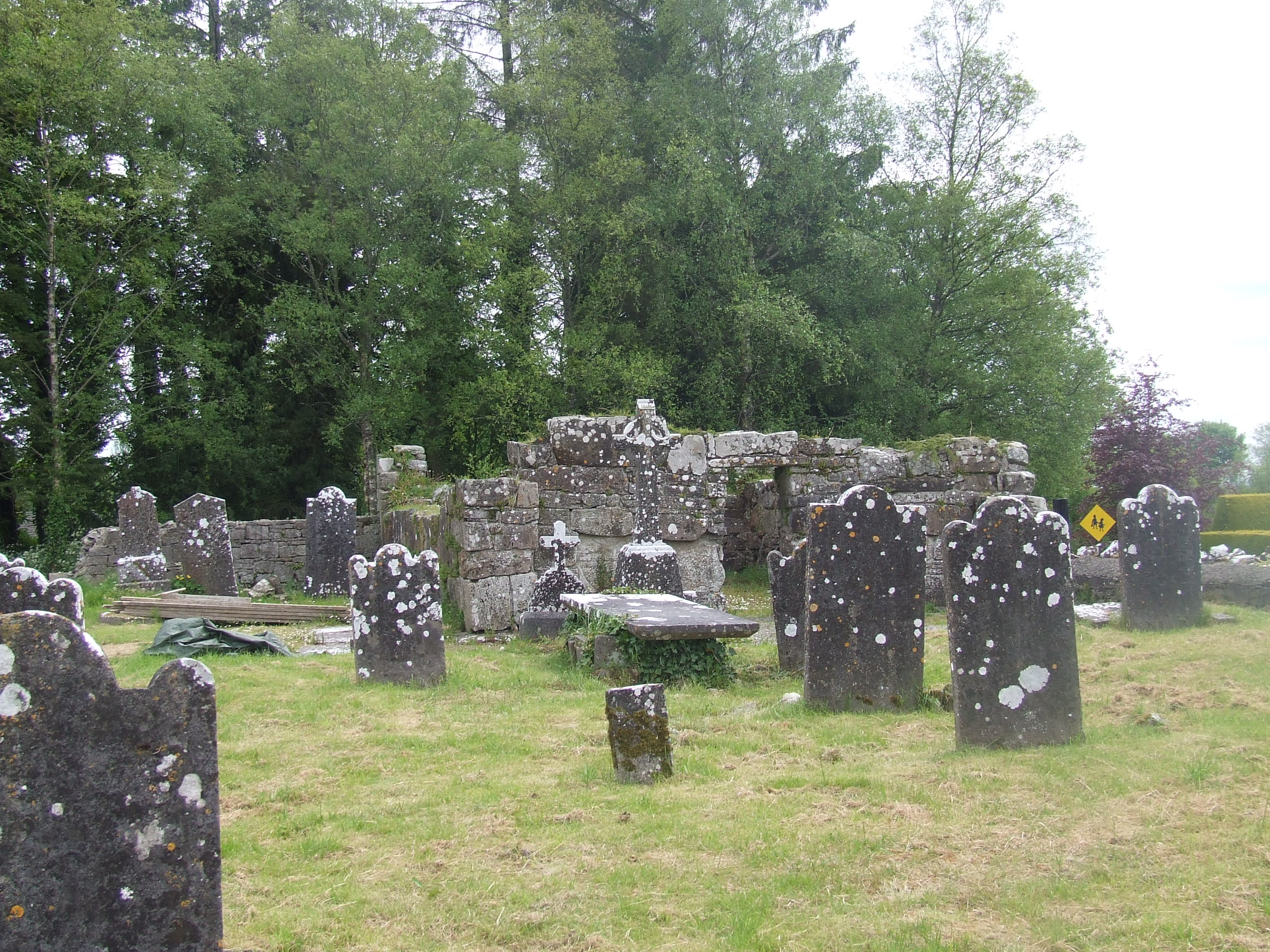
Church of St Mel, Ardagh, viewed from the graveyard. June 2013

=== Early and pre-history ===
Ardagh village is located beside Ardagh Mountain, a hill which reaches a height of 650 feet (200 metres). This hill, formerly known as Brí Leith, was believed to be home of Midir, a pre-Christian king of the ancient Tuatha De Danann. Brí Leith is associated with several folkloric stories and is mentioned in the Book of Tara. The Book of Rights notes that the high king was entitled to have bilberries from Brí Leith as part of his harvest meal.

There are several important Early Christian sites in and near Ardagh, including the Church of St. Mel. St. Mel is the patron of Ardagh and was the first bishop, he was part of St. Patrick's entourage and some say he was his nephew. St. Mel is thought to have been buried there. The history of Ardagh dates back to the dawn of Christianity in Ireland, and it's episcopal succession can be tracked back to one of the primitive fathers of the Irish church.

During the medieval period, Ardagh experienced some "religious turmoil", and in 1167 the settlement, including the church and houses, was burned down. Then, in 1230, Ardagh was the scene of contest for the role of bishop, resulting it the destruction of the episcopal house and cathedral tower. William O'Ferrall, who was Bishop of Ardagh in 1496 (and had been since 1479), tried to take over as the chieftain of Longford (known as the lordship of Annaly at the time). His aim was to take over as chieftain from the other branch of the O'Ferrall family, resulting in an attack on Ardagh. After the attack, the cathedral was left without a roof, sacristy, campanile, and bell, leaving only a single altar standing. The church is still in ruins today and the village saw limited development until the Featherston family arrived in the 1700s.

A fairy tree in Ardagh was featured on a 1983 episode of The Live Mike presented by Mike Murphy. The owner of the land on which the tree grew stated that, if the tree were to fall over, he would have "less than one week to live".

=== Featherston family ===
The first Featherston recorded in Ardagh was Thomas Featherston, who acquired 235 acres of land in the area in 1703. He died in 1749. While no exact date is known for the construction of Ardagh House, it is believed to have been visited by Oliver Goldsmith in 1745. According to local legend, Goldsmith's visit to Ardagh House inspired his comedy She Stoops to Conquer or Mistakes of a Night. Reputedly, while looking for an inn, some locals directed Goldsmith to the Featherston mansion "in jest". According to this story, the Featherstons realised the joke and played along. The following morning, Goldsmith was made aware of his mistake and, years after the experience, he used the events to influence the plot of his comedy.

Sir Ralph Fetherston, 1st Baronet, was given the rank of baronet in 1776, and this descended to later heads of the family. Among the contributions of the Fetherston baronets to Ardagh were significant developments carried out within the village in the 1860s. Much of the village layout was designed and built by the architect J. Rawson Carroll, reputedly based on Lady Fetherston's idea of a Swiss village. A clock tower, village green, and arts-and-crafts style houses were designed with the view from the house in mind. The view from the front door of Ardagh House encompasses much of the village, from the Church of Ireland church on the left, to the old rectory on the right.

=== Later development ===
Ardagh's Heritage Centre tracks the history of the village, including its literary associations, which include featuring pseudonymously in Oliver Goldsmith's She Stoops to Conquer, and in a poem by Eavan Boland.

The village was awarded the Prix d'Honneur of the Entente Florale and won the Irish Tidy Towns Competition on three occasions in 1989, 1996 and 1998.

== Development and architecture ==
According to Longford County Council's 2006 Local Area Plan, Ardagh had seen a number of young families moving to the village, resulting in the "demographic augmentation of the village" as well as the building of new houses in the area. The centre of Ardagh village is still the village green, with three roads stemming from the centre; towards Longford (north), Carrickboy (west), and east in the direction of Edgeworthstown. There are a number of different styles of houses in Ardagh dating back to the 1860s. However, the building materials have stayed relatively the same throughout the years, with one modern difference being the black cast iron gutters in some cases being replaced with more modern equivalents such as aluminium or uPVC. The fasciae are one of the most distinctive features of 1860 houses in Ardagh. The original fasciae are ornately carved timber however, this is another category of features that have been replaced with modern equivalents. The 1860s' houses were built from ashlar limestone or sandstone, with limestone corner stones and details around the windows, while the more modern houses are a combination of stone or brick covered in plaster. Some houses also have a shamrock fanlight above the door. While no original doors remain from 1860, the shape of the doorway suggests they could have been wooden double doors. Every house designed by Rawson Carroll also has a shed which (together with the boundary walls) is part of the "character of the village".

== Public transport ==
Edgeworthstown railway station is around 9 kilometres from the village. Until August 2013, Bus Éireann route 118 (Dublin-Mullingar-Longford) served Ardagh on Saturdays.

== See also ==
- Cathedral of Saint Mel in Ardagh
- List of towns and villages in Ireland
