= Diocese of Ardagh and Clonmacnoise =

Catholic diocese in Ireland

Coordinates: 53.7272°N 7.7963°W

Diocese of Ardagh and Clonmacnoise Dioecesis Ardachadensis et Cluanensis Deoise Ardach agus Chluain Mhic Nóis

Catholic
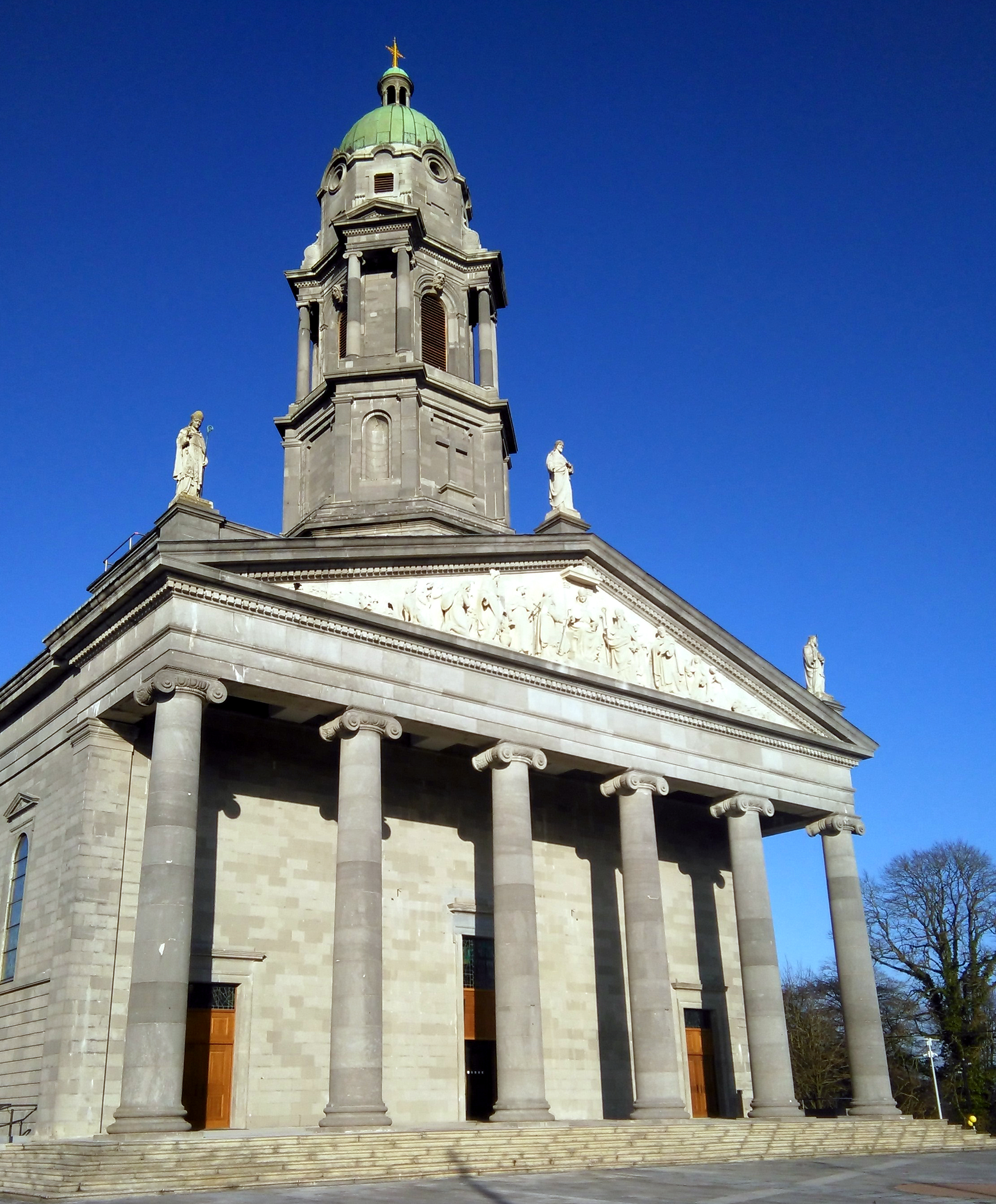
- St Mel's cathedral, Longford

Location
- Country: Ireland
- Territory: Most of counties Longford and Leitrim and parts of counties Cavan, Offaly, Roscommon, Sligo and Westmeath
- Ecclesiastical province: Province of Armagh
- Metropolitan: Archdiocese of Armagh

Statistics
- Area: 940 sq mi (2,400 km^{2})
- Population: Total; Catholics: (as of 2022); 89,440; 76,660 (85.7%)
- Parishes: 41
- Churches: 82

Information
- Denomination: Catholic
- Rite: Roman Rite
- Established: 1756
- Cathedral: St. Mel's Cathedral, Longford
- Patron saint: St Mel
- Secular priests: 61

Current leadership
- Pope: Leo XIV
- Bishop: Paul Connell, Bishop of Ardagh and Clonmacnoise
- Metropolitan Archbishop: Eamon Martin
- Vicar General: Monsignor Patrick Early
- Bishops emeritus: Colm O'Reilly

Map
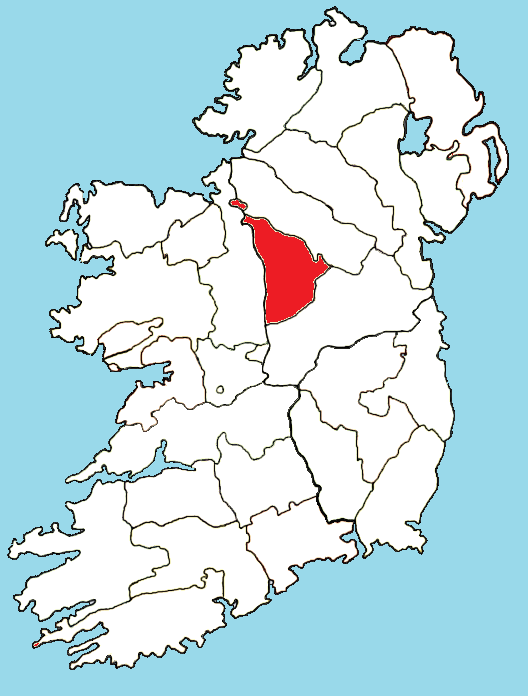

Website
- ardaghdiocese.org

The Diocese of Ardagh and Clonmacnoise (Latin: Dioecesis Ardachadensis et Cluanensis; Irish: Deoise Ardach agus Chluain Mhic Nóis) is a Latin Church diocese of the Catholic Church in Ireland.

== Geography ==
The diocese is entirely within the Republic of Ireland and contains most of counties Longford and Leitrim, with parts of counties Cavan, Offaly, Roscommon, Sligo and Westmeath. The main towns in the diocese are Athlone, Ballymahon, Carrick-on-Shannon, Edgeworthstown, Granard and Longford.

== Ecclesiastical history ==
=== Lordship and Kingdom of Ireland ===
The union of the sees of Ardagh and Clonmacnoise, which had been proposed in 1709, was carried into effect following the death of Stephen MacEgan, Bishop of Meath on 30 May 1756, who had been administering the see of Clonmacnoise. Augustine Cheevers, Bishop of Ardagh, was translated to the see of Meath on 7 August 1756, and Anthony Blake was appointed as the first bishop of united see of Ardagh and Clonmacnoise on 11 August 1756.

=== Modern times ===
On Christmas Day 2009, St Mel's cathedral in Longford was destroyed by fire. Bishop O'Reilly said that the building is "just a shell" and "burned out from end to end". The bishop said construction on the cathedral began in 1840 and he described it as a flagship Cathedrals of the midlands. After a long investigation the cause of the fire was traced back to a brick lined chimney at the rear of the cathedral. St Mel's was restored, reopening in 2014.

== Bishop of Ardagh and Clonmacnoise ==
On 5 April 2023, Paul Connell was appointed the Bishop of Ardagh and Clonmacnoise by Pope Francis.

== List of parishes ==
The following are the current parishes in the diocese (official names in italics where they differ from the currently-used names)

- Abbeylara (County Longford)
- Aghavas (County Leitrim)
- Annaduff (County Leitrim)
- Ardagh and Moydow (County Longford)
- Athlone (St. Mary's) (County Westmeath)
- Ballinahown, Boher and Pullagh (Lemanaghan) (County Offaly and County Westmeath)
- Ballinalee (Clonbroney) (County Longford)
- Ballymachugh (Ballymachugh and Drumlumman South) (County Cavan)
- Ballymahon (Shrule) (County Longford)
- Bornacoola (County Leitrim and County Longford)
- Carrickedmond and Abbeyshrule (Taghshinny, Taghshinod and Abbeyshrule) (County Longford)
- Cashel (County Longford)
- Carrick-on-Shannon (Kiltoghert) (County Leitrim)
- Cloghan and Banagher (Gallen and Rynagh) (County Offaly)
- Clonguish (County Longford)
- Cloone (County Leitrim)
- Colmcille (Columbkille) (County Longford)
- Dromard (County Longford)
- Drumlish (County Longford)
- Drumshanbo (Murhaun) (County Leitrim)
- Fenagh (County Leitrim)
- Ferbane (Wheery and Tisaran) (County Offaly)
- Gortletteragh (County Leitrim)
- Granard (County Longford)
- Keadue, Arigna and Ballyfarnon (Kilronan) (County Roscommon)
- Kenagh (Kilcommock) (County Longford)
- Killashee (Killashee and Clondra) (County Longford)
- Killenummery and Ballintogher (Killanummery and Killery) (County Leitrim and County Sligo)
- Killoe (County Longford)
- Kiltubrid (County Leitrim)
- Legan and Ballycloghan (Kilglass, Rathreagh and Agharra) (County Longford)
- Longford (Templemichael and Ballymacormack) (County Longford)
- Lough Gowna and Mullinalaghta (Scrabby and Columbkille East) (County Cavan and County Longford)
- Moate and Mount Temple (Calry, Ballyloughloe and Kilcleagh) (County Westmeath)
- Mohill (Mohill Manacháin) (County Leitrim)
- Mostrim (County Longford)
- Mullahoran (Drumlumman North and Loughduff) (County Cavan)
- Rathcline (County Longford)
- Rathowen (Rathaspic and Russagh) (County Westmeath)
- Shannonbridge (Clonmacnois) (County Offaly)
- Streete (County Longford and County Westmeath)

== See also ==
- Catholic Church in Ireland
- Diocese of Kilmore, Elphin and Ardagh (Church of Ireland)

== Bibliography ==
- Fryde, E. B.; Greenway, D. E.; Porter, S.; Roy, I., eds. (1986). Handbook of British Chronology (3rd, reprinted 2003 ed.). Cambridge: Cambridge University Press. ISBN 0-521-56350-X.
- Moody, T. W.; Martin, F. X.; Byrne, F. J., eds. (1984). Maps, Genealogies, Lists: A Companion to Irish History, Part II. A New History of Ireland. Vol. IX. Oxford: Oxford University Press. ISBN 0-19-821745-5.
