= Roman Catholic Diocese of Killala =

Catholic diocese in Ireland

Coordinates: 54.1129°N 9.1506°W

Diocese of Killala Dioecesis Alladensis Deoise Chill Ala

Catholic
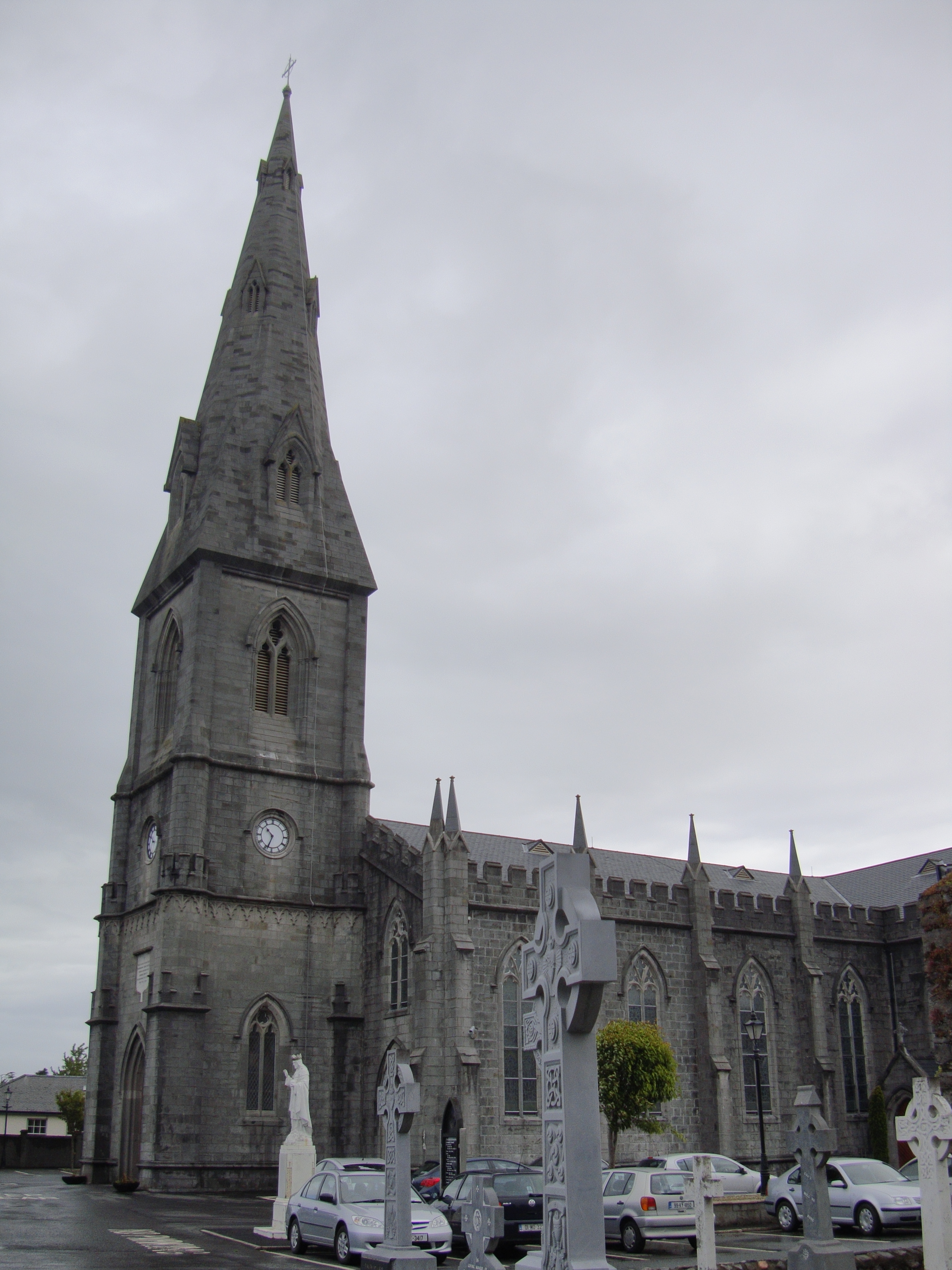
- St Muredach's Cathedral, Ballina

Location
- Country: Ireland
- Territory: Parts of counties Mayo and Sligo
- Ecclesiastical province: Tuam

Statistics
- Area: 1,449 sq mi (3,750 km^{2})
- Population: 38,715

Information
- Denomination: Catholic
- Sui iuris church: Latin Church
- Rite: Roman Rite
- Established: 1111
- Cathedral: St Muredach's, Ballina
- Patron saint: Muredach

Current leadership
- Pope: Leo XIV
- Bishop: Francis Duffy, Archbishop of Tuam and Bishop of Killala
- Metropolitan Archbishop: Francis Duffy, Archbishop of Tuam
- Apostolic Administrator: Francis Duffy, Archbishop of Tuam
- Bishops emeritus: John Fleming, Bishop of Killala

Map
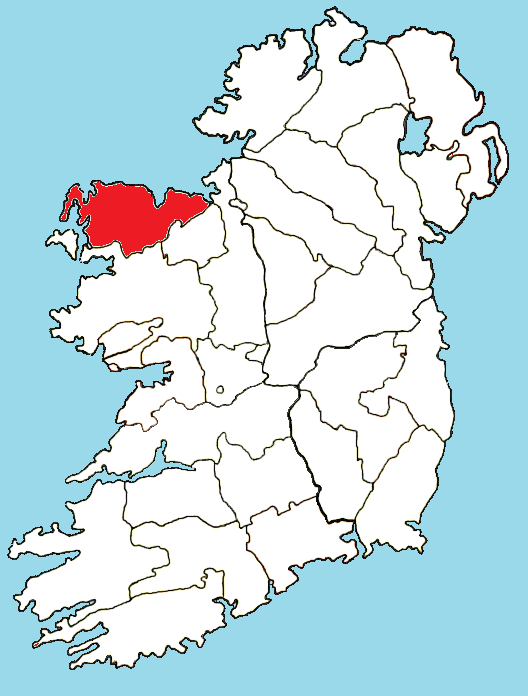

Website
- killaladiocese.org

The Diocese of Killala (Irish: Deoise Chill Ala) is a Latin Church diocese of the Catholic Church in Connacht; the western province of Ireland. It is in the Metropolitan Province of Tuam and is subject to the Metropolitan Archdiocese of Tuam. As of 2024, the seat of the Diocese is “Sede Vacante” meaning there is no current permanent Bishop appointed to this Diocese.

== Geography ==
The Killala diocese covers the northernmost parts of County Mayo and County Sligo. The largest towns are Ballina, Belmullet and Crossmolina.

== History ==
=== Up to the Kingdom of Ireland ===
In the year 1111 the Diocese of Killala was created and its boundaries delineated by the Synod of Rathbreasail. Later, at the Synod of Kells in 1152 the boundaries were revised and confirmed within the Province of Tuam.

The first bishop of Killala mentioned in Roman records was Donatus O'Bechdha: his possession of the diocese was confirmed in a rescript dated 30 March 1198 by Pope Innocent III. This records the transfer of ancient churches, monasteries and church properties to the jurisdiction of the diocesan bishop. In the process it provides a record of place names in the diocese. Insula Gedig, for example, is Iniskea, an island in Blacksod Bay. Inisgluairibrandani is Inisglora of Brendan. The original monastery on this island was said to be founded by St. Brendan.

In the twelfth century three of the oldest native Irish monasteries were ordered to adopt the Rule of the Canons of St. Augustine: Cross Abbey (which had been transferred from Inisglora to Kilmore Erris); Errew Abbey on Lough Conn and Aughris in Tireragh (said to have been founded from Inishmurray by Molaise of Leighlin in 571). In the Middle Ages monasteries in the diocese included the three just mentioned, together with Rathfran, Ardnaree, Rosserk, Moyne, and Bofeenaun as well as other churches like Kilglass.

In the fifteenth century, Bishop Bernard O'Conaill (1432–1461) involved himself in the Franciscan reform of the monasteries. Rosserk refused to reform and he supported the building of Moyne. This period was one of internecine conflict with churches despoiled and ravaged. In fact O'Conaill himself was killed by the brother of a disaffected priest.

In the Reformation period, great efforts were made to establish English rule along the western sea board and conflict with religious authorities was part and parcel of that reality. On a trumped-up charge, Bishop Redmund O'Gallagher, a thorn in the side of the authorities, was imprisoned and banished from the diocese. In 1566 he presided over the synod held to promulgate the decrees of the Council of Trent.

=== 1645 to 1851 ===
Francis Kirwan, who was appointed in 1645, is the only Killala bishop who had a biography written of him, by his nephew, and it gives a good insight into the diocese in the middle of the seventeenth century. He was one of the four bishops representing the Irish bishops at the Confederation of Kilkenny. He introduced a small catechism and had plans to set up a craft school. But then Cromwell came and the bishop lost his residence in Killala and went into hiding in a mice-infested room where he said Mass on a chest. Later he returned in disguise to his native Galway. In June 1654 he was taken into custody with thirty priests and after fourteen months he was deported to Nantes.

Tadhg O'Rourke, a Franciscan friar, was bishop from 1707 to 1739. In a letter to Rome he reported that the diocese had twenty two parishes but only sixteen parish priests. The Catholic flock was numerous but they lived in direst poverty because the fertile lands had been confiscated and Catholics were forced to live in the mountains and the bogs.

In the time of Bishop Bellew (1779–1812), Ballina became the ecclesiastical centre of the diocese. When the French landed at Killala he kept a low profile even though his brother joined the French forces and was killed. Bellew was involved in the two great issues of his time, the founding of Maynooth College and the struggle for Catholic Emancipation. In 1825 John MacHale, later Archbishop of Tuam, became coadjutor to Bishop Thomas Waldron who assigned to him a project first proposed in 1820: building a new cathedral to replace the old thatched church built about 1740. The first Mass was said in the new building in autumn 1831. The interior was left unfinished because of lack of funds. No work was done again until the 1840s. In 1846 the onset of the Great Famine put a halt to further work. All church resources had to be devoted to the alleviation of hunger. The cathedral was not completed until 1892 and has been renovated at a cost of £1.5 million.

Killala Diocese suffered terribly in the Great Famine. In 1847 a Mayo road inspector reported that he had secured the burial of 140 bodies which he found lying by the wayside, while in the same year fourteen schooners left Westport laden with wheat and oats. The Sligo Champion of 26 February 1847 reported, "Every hour the calamity is increasing, hundreds of unfortunate creatures have, within the last week, died of starvation. They were hurried to the grave coffinless and shroudless, so great is the mortality that the ancient customs are forgotten". By 1851 a million had perished in Ireland and another million had succeeded in getting away.

=== 1970 to present ===
After a short period of growth in the 1970s, when 20,000 emigrants returned to Connacht, rural communities in the West continued to decline. In the 65 years up to 1991, Connacht and Donegal lost one fifth of its population. In the diocese there were villages and townlands where the total population between the ages of 20 and 35 were less than five people. Between 1986 and 1991, the rate of net emigration from the West more than doubled while births more than halved.

In the 1991 the Western bishops launched an initiative called "Developing the West Together". This led to mass meetings in the western dioceses. In Killala, over 500 attended a conference in Ballina and over 200 in Belmullet. Out of these meetings grew "core groups" which had input into an EU-funded study of the West of Ireland called by the bishops. This study resulted in the publication of the "Report on Crusade for Survival".

This process, generated by the bishops' initiative, resulted in a number of developments including: the establishment by the bishops of the Council of the West, a government task force which published the "Report on Crusade for Survival" and the establishment by the government on 1 February 1999 of the Western Development Commission.

== Leadership ==
The following is a basic list of the post-Reformation Roman Catholic Ordinaries.

- Redmond O'Gallagher (1545–1569)
- Donat O'Gallagher, O.F.M. (1570–1580)
- John O'Cahasy, O.F.M. (1580–1583)
- Sede vacante (1583–1591)
- (Miler Cawell, vicar apostolic, appointed 1591)
- (Andrew Lynch, vicar apostolic, appointed 1629)
- Francis Kirwan (1645–1661)
- Sede vacante (1661–1671)
- (John de Burgo, vicar apostolic, appointed 1671)
- (Ambrose Madden, appointed 1695, but did not take effect)
- Sede vacante (1695–1703)
- Thaddeus Francis O'Rourke, O.F.M. (1703–1735)
- Peter Archdekin, O.F.M. (1735–c.1739 )
- Bernard O'Rourke (1739–c.1743 )
- John Brett, O.P. (1743–1748)
- Mark Skerret (1749–1749)
- Bonaventura MacDonnell, O.F.M. (1749–1760)
- Philip Phillips (1760–1776)
- Alexander Irwin (1776–1779)
- Dominic Bellew (1779–c.1812 )
- Sede vacante (1812–1814)
- Peter Waldron (1814–1834)
- John MacHale (1834)
- Francis Joseph O'Finan, O.P. (1835–1847)
- Tommaso Feeny (1848–1873)
- Hugh Conway (1873–1893)
- John Conmy (1893–1911)
- James Naughton (1911–1950)
- Patrick O’Boyle (1950–1970)
- Thomas McDonnell (1970–1987)
- Thomas Anthony Finnegan (1987–2002)
- John Fleming (2002 – 2024)
- Sede vacante (2024 – 2026) (Francis Duffy was appointed apostolic administrator on 10 April 2024.)
- Francis Duffy (23 February 2026 – present), uniting the dioceses of Killala and Tuam in persona Episcopi

== See also ==
- Catholic Church in Ireland
- Diocese of Tuam, Killala and Achonry (Church of Ireland)
