= Newman Institute =

Roman Catholic faith formation charity in Ireland

Newman Institute of Ireland
- Nickname: Newman
- Established: 1998
- Type: Roman Catholic educational charity
- Headquarters: Cathedral Close, Ballina
- Location: Ballina, County Mayo, Ireland
- Coordinates: 54.1122°N 9.1503°W
- Director: Michael Gilroy
- Chancellor: Bishop John Fleming
- Affiliations: Diocese of Killala
- Staff: 1 (2021)
- Website: https://newman.ie/

The Newman Institute is a charitable organisation based in Ballina, County Mayo in Ireland. Operating in conjunction with the Roman Catholic Diocese of Killala, one of its stated aims is to "provide an opportunity for people to learn more about their faith through accredited and non-accredited faith formation courses". The Newman Institute was founded in 1998 by the then Bishop of Killala Thomas Finnegan. It is based in a building, near St Muredach's Cathedral, Ballina. which was officially opened in October 2010 by then President of Ireland, Mary McAleese.

In January 2009, the organisation launched a Diploma in Applied Theology in association with St. Angela's College, Sligo which was accredited by the National University of Ireland, Galway (NUIG). A Bachelor in Theology and Community Involvement course, also offered in association with St. Angela's and NUIG, was launched in 2010. The institute's first six degree students graduated in November 2015.

The Newman Institute is registered with the Charities Regulator as being involved in the "advancement of education" and "advancement of religion". As of 2021, it had one full time employee.
