= St Muredach's College =

Secondary school in Ballina, County Mayo, Ireland

Location
- Sligo Road; Ballina, County Mayo; Ireland
- 54°6′53.7″N 9°8′34.8″W

Information
- Motto: Viriliter Agite ('Act in a manly way')
- Denomination: Roman Catholic
- Patron saint: St. Muredach
- Founded: 10 September 1906
- Founder: Bishop of Killala
- School number: 64510J
- Principal: Wayne Walsh
- Gender: Male
- Enrolment: 401 (2025)
- Classes offered: First Year to Leaving Certificate
- Colours: White and red
- Nickname: Dachs
- Website: www.stmuredachscollege.ie

St Muredach's College is an all-boys secondary school on the banks of the River Moy in Ballina, County Mayo, Ireland. It was founded in 1906 to provide a Catholic education for boys in the Killala Diocese. The school building, which was designed by William Henry Byrne, is included on the Record of Protected Structures maintained by Mayo County Council.

== History ==
In 1901, the then Bishop of Killala proposed that a new school be opened as there was otherwise no secondary school between Belmullet and Sligo. St Muredach's opened in September 1906. The original school building, which was designed by W.H. Byrne, was built on a site overlooking the River Moy. Originally housing 76 boarding students, a new extension was opened in 1937.

Fr. Cyril Haran taught at the school in the mid-20th century.

In 1967, the school's enrolment increased due to the coming of free education nationally. Around the same time, additional subjects were offered, including mechanical drawing, woodwork and art. Extra classrooms were required, and a further extension was added in the late 1960s. A physical education hall was added in the 1970s. By the late 1980s, boarding was phased out, and a new building (incorporating a woodwork room, art room and classrooms) came into use in 1990. A computer room, library and canteen were added in the late 1990s and early 2000s.

The schools' first lay principal was appointed in 2008.

== Teachers ==
- Patrick O'Boyle (1887–1971) - Bishop of Killala
- Cyril Haran (1931–2014) - priest, Gaelic footballer
- Christopher Jones (1936–2018) - Bishop of Elphin

== Alumni ==
- Martin Birrane (1935–2018), businessman and racing car driver
- Ger Cafferkey (b. 1987), Gaelic footballer
- Dara Calleary (b. 1976), Minister of State
- David Cawley (b. 1991) professional footballer
- David Clarke (b. 1983), Gaelic footballer
- Mark Duffy (b. 1991), Senator
- Ray Foley (b. 1981), radio and television presenter
- Michael Gaughan (1949–1974), Irish republican, hunger-striker
- Mick Loftus (1929–2023), Gaelic footballer
- Kevin McLoughlin (b. 1989) Gaelic footballer
- Kevin McStay (b. 1962), Gaelic footballer and manager
- P.J. Ruttledge (1892–1952), Fianna Fáil politician
- Declan Walsh (b.1976), journalist
