= Priest shortage in the Catholic Church =

In the years since World War II there has been a substantial reduction in the number of priests per capita in the Catholic Church, a phenomenon considered by many to constitute a "shortage" in the number of priests. From 1980 to 2012, the ratio of Catholics per priest increased globally, with the number of Catholics per priest going from 1,895 to 3,126.

In 2014, there were 49,153 parishes in the world that had no resident priest pastor. Between 1970 and 2023, the number of priests declined from 419,728 to 407,872 despite a large increase in the number of Catholics.

== Shortage by area ==
=== Worldwide ===
Worldwide, the number of priests in 1970 was 419,728. In 2017, there were a total of 414,582 priests. While the total number of priests worldwide has therefore remained relatively stable since 1970, the Catholic population has nearly doubled, growing from 653.6 million in 1970 to 1.229 billion in 2012. In 2012 the global number of candidates for the priesthood also showed its first decline in recent years.

The number of parishes with no resident priest pastor has grown from 39,431 in 1970 to 49,153 in 2012. The number of parishes without a priest does not include the thousands of parishes that have closed or merged due to a lack of priests.

=== North America ===
==== Mexico ====
Mexico is facing a "crisis of vocation," according to Elio Masferrer, a religion expert at Mexico's National School of Anthropology and History. Over 85 percent of the population is Catholic, but one priest is expected to minister to approximately 7,000 followers. In the United States, where approximately one quarter of the population is Catholic, there is one priest per 2,000 Catholics.

==== United States ====

Historical number of priests in the US
Year	Pop.	±%
1930	27,000	—
1950	50,500	+87.0%
1965	58,632	+16.1%
1970	59,192	+1.0%
1975	58,909	−0.5%
1980	58,398	−0.9%
1985	57,317	−1.9%
1990	52,124	−9.1%
1995	49,054	−5.9%
2000	45,699	−6.8%
2005	41,399	−9.4%
2010	39,993	−3.4%
2015	37,192	−7.0%
2020	35,513	−4.5%
2022	34,344	−3.3%
Includes both diocesan priests and religious priests (i.e., priests who belong to a religious order).

The situation in the United States is that the Catholic Church is unique among eleven of the largest Christian denominations "in several areas: the dwindling supply of priests, the increasing number of lay people per priest, the declining number of priests per parish, [and] the increasing number of 'priestless' parishes [...] In the Catholic Church, the total number of priests has declined from 58,534 in 1981 to 52,227 in 1991, 45,713 in 2001" and 37,192 in 2015 (a 36 percent loss between 1981 and 2016).

With the Catholic population increasing steadily and the number of priests declining, the number of laypeople per priest has climbed from 875:1 in 1981 to 1,113:1 in 1991, 1,429:1 in 2001 and 2,000:1 in 2012 (a 130 percent increase). The declining number of priests in parish ministry is producing a marked increase in the number of 'priestless' parishes. In 1960, only about 3 percent of Catholic parishes had no resident pastor. By 2000 that figure was up to 13 percent, and by the summer of 2003 it had risen to 16 percent".

Between 1965 and 2012, the number of USA parishes without a priest climbed from 549 to 3,496. Research by Davidson found "a growing shortage of Catholic priests but an increasing supply—some analysts say an oversupply—of clergy in most Protestant denominations". Similarly, Richard Schoenherr found in 1993 that "the current clergy shortage is a distinct Catholic crisis". (Note: The 1993 Schoenherr, Young, and Cheng projected figures are not consistent with actual figures. Schoenherr, Young, and Cheng projected a 2005 population of diocesan priests at 21,000 which is not the 30,607 figure by the Center for Applied Research in the Apostolate.)

===== Recent developments =====
In 2013 the statistics suggested a change in the trend.

[T]here were 3,608 post-baccalaureate U.S. seminarians last year, a net increase of 125 seminarians, or 4 percent, over the previous year and the highest number since the early 1990s. More than three-quarters of them were studying for the diocesan priesthood, while 24 percent intend to be ordained for religious orders.

The numbers were up across the board in non-Catholic seminaries too:

The organization that accredits theological schools said 75,431 people were studying for the ministry at 261 institutions during the last academic year, an increase of .6 percent from the year before."

This hopeful expectation was, however, not backed by an increase in ordinations, which are stable at a low level of 6–7 per year per million Catholics for over 15 years. But Theological College's Phillip Brown said a rise in enrollment was only part of the story:

"It's not just the numbers but the quality and spirit of the men who are coming," he told CNS. "I'm tremendously impressed with the quality of the candidates, their zeal," he added. "We're seeing a real renewal of the priesthood."

In 2008 the enrollment of Saint John's Seminary in Boston rose to 87, double that of two years earlier. The rise was credited to an increase of foreign-born seminarians as well as an increasing number of members of Catholic revitalization movements, most prominent the Neocatechumenal Way. By 2016 the number rose further to 114.

==== Canada ====
In August 2026, 10 Catholic churches in western Quebec announced that they would be temporally suspending mass in September due to a shortage of priests. The diocese also announced that the affected churches would not be closing and encouraged affected churchgoers to attend mass at other nearby churches of the diocese.

=== Europe ===
Der Spiegel has reported that Germany, which used to send missionary priests to other countries, now has a shortage of new clergy. As a result, some German congregations have merged, and the church has recruited priests from elsewhere. Approximately 10 percent of Catholic priests in Germany, about 1,300, are immigrants, with many hailing from India.

In Ireland, the decade from 2002 to 2012 saw the number of Catholic diocesan priests drop 13 per cent, similar to the decrease in the number of priests in religious congregations. And many priests remaining are elderly and approaching retirement. "The crisis is now mathematically certain. If we keep going the way we are, the future of the Irish priesthood is now unsustainable," noted Brendan Hoban, head of the Association of Catholic priests. In 2017 Fr Sean McDonagh wrote an article in the Tablet saying "Over 65 per cent of Irish priests are aged 55 or over. There are only two priests under the age of 40 in the Archdiocese of Dublin. A priest in Killala diocese, Fr Brendan Hoban, pointed out that there has been a priest and celebration of the Eucharist in his parish – Moygownagh – since the eighth century. But he believes he will be that last priest in that parish. At the moment there is a priest in every parish in Killala. Within 20 years there will be seven serving 22 parishes spread out over a wide area. The situation is much same in other dioceses. The research points out that to maintain the status quo would mean ordaining 82 priests each year. The reality is that 20 students entered Maynooth in September 2013. It is likely that only 10 or 12 will be ordained in 2020".

In Spain, Catholic Church sources confirmed that the country is experiencing a shortage of priests. Rural priests are in some cases responsible for up to a half dozen parishes at a time. In one case, a priest in Cantabria is responsible for 22 parishes. A study sponsored by the church showed that in 2007, at least 10,615 of the 23,286 parishes in Spain had no priest in permanent residence.

In 2009, only 90 priests were ordained in France, a significant drop from the 112 that were ordained a decade before. The church hierarchy is alarmed and has managed the problem thus far with recruitment from abroad. There are over 1,300 foreign Catholic priests in France, or approximately 10% of the priesthood; over 650 come from Africa, typically from poor African countries such as Togo, Madagascar and Burkina Faso, where churches have enough priests or simply cannot pay for more.

Poland has historically had one of the highest ordination rates per Catholics in Europe, and while it is still remains far higher than other European Catholic countries such as Ireland, Italy, or Spain, since the 1970s there has been a steady decrease in ordinations in Poland. Some causes for this decline are attributed to decreased religiosity, decrease in birth rates, increase in emigration, and a decline of enrollment in college seminaries.

=== Africa ===
The region where Catholicism is experiencing its fastest growth is in Africa, but the growth in the number of priests is not keeping up with the growth of congregants. The Catholic population there has grown by 238 percent since 1980 and is approaching 200 million, thus far exceeding the growth in the number of priests, which was up 131 percent in the same period.

=== Latin America ===
The National Catholic Reporter describes the priest shortage in Latin America: "Like most other parts of the world, this vast region, home to more than 40 percent of all the world's Catholics, has a worrying shortage of ordained presbyters required for validly celebrating the sacraments, the lifeblood of Catholic Christianity."

During his visit to Brazil, Pope Benedict XVI briefly noted in his remarks the shortage of priests in Latin America. The shortage of priests is a problem that the church hierarchy there describes as particularly acute. At a time when the Catholic church is losing membership to Pentecostal churches, Evangelical Protestant preachers outnumber Catholic priests 2 to 1. In 1980, nine of every 10 Brazilians self-identified as Roman Catholics, but that percentage has steadily dropped. By 2007 only two-thirds of Brazilians remain Catholics as the country struggles with a shortage of priests.

In 2014 Bishop Erwin Krautler, a bishop who leads a geographically expansive diocese in the Brazilian rain forest met with Pope Francis to discuss how much the priest shortage affects the church in the Southern Hemisphere. Krautler's diocese only has 27 priests for 700,000 Catholics. As a result, many Catholics might only hear Mass a couple of times a year.

=== Asia ===
Until recently India had sufficient priests but is now experiencing difficulty in recruiting seminarians. "Until some years ago, brighter young men willing to join the priesthood were plenty in India. But now, for various reasons, as their preference is changing, it threatens to pose many crises for the community in the future," said Udumala Bala, the deputy secretary general of the Conference of Catholic Bishops of India (CCBI).

In the Philippines, the ratio of priests to Catholics is approximately 1 to 8,000. But Cardinal-Archbishop Luis Antonio Tagle says the ideal number should be one priest per 2,000 Catholics. In Manila in 2013, the ratio was 1 priest to 20,000 parishioners.

== Consequences ==
The shortage is being dealt with in a variety of ways. A practice known as "linking" has emerged, where two parishes share the same priest but remain separate otherwise. Some parishes hire a lay administrator. Churches have given guidelines on lay-led services. In some places, Mass at the local church is celebrated only every other week or less. Some countries are importing priests from other nations. Priests in India have been saying Masses for people in the West and traveling to wealthier countries as temporary pastors to help relieve the priest shortage in the West.

At the same time, however, there has been a growth in the number of men and women entering other forms of ministry in the church, such as deacons and lay ecclesial ministers. There has been a dramatic increase in the participation and activity of the laity in general. Often, this is not a matter of deacons or lay ecclesial ministers taking over priestly roles, but of priests no longer taking over diaconal or lay roles. Canon law (CIC 517) does allow for a deacon or lay ecclesial minister to be appointed as de facto pastor of a parish, under the supervision of a priest moderator, in the absence of a qualified presbyter.

According to sociologist Dean Hoge, the number of Roman Catholics in the world has been growing, but "the growth in the number of priests has been zero." Wealthy western nations have a shrinking population of priests, while other countries are adding priests, "though not always fast enough." Hoge offered eight suggestions to offset the priest shortage in the United States: recruit more seminarians, incardinate more immigrant priests, ordain more married former Anglican clergy, permit marriage for diocesan priests, (Note: Hoge found that celibacy, i.e., abstaining from marriage, was "single biggest deterrent keeping men from entering the priesthood" in a 1985 survey of Catholic college students.) incardinate more former Catholic priests who left the church for marriage, ordain more permanent deacons, employ more lay ministers, or ordain women.

== Causes ==
Various causes for the priest shortage have been suggested and, in some cases, studied. They include:

=== Clerical celibacy ===
In 1985, Dean R. Hoge conducted a survey of Catholic college students and determined that celibacy was the most significant deterrent keeping men from entering the priesthood in the Latin Church (celibacy, although highly praised, is not a legal requirement in the Eastern Catholic canon law of the Eastern Catholic Churches). Hoge estimated that if celibacy were optional for diocesan priests, there would be four times the number of men entering the priesthood.

=== Age of current priests ===
The Center for Applied Research in the Apostolate study in 2008 noted that half of the approximately 19,000 active diocesan priests in the U.S. expected to retire before 2019.

=== Smaller family size ===
Pope Benedict XVI, when he was Cardinal Ratzinger, identified smaller family size and changing family priorities as the cause of the Catholic priest shortage, rather than priestly celibacy. "If today the average number of children is 1.5", he reasoned, "the question of possible priests takes on a very different role from what it was in ages when families were considerably larger." The main obstacle, he argued, was parents "who have very different expectations for their children."

=== Sexual abuse scandal ===
The exposure of sexual abuse committed by Catholic priests in various parts of the world tarnished the reputation of priests globally. This is theorized to have discouraged some men from pursuing the priesthood and contributed to the shortage. This is yet to be determined.

=== Socioeconomic expectations ===
Sandra Yocum, a professor specializing in faith and culture at the University of Dayton, notes that in the past the priesthood carried high prestige in Catholic culture: having a son become a priest was once seen as a pinnacle of success for working-class Catholic families. But as socioeconomic opportunities and expectations have risen in western societies, a son joining the priesthood could be seen as diminishing the family's prosperity.

== See also ==
- Catholic Church hierarchy
- Catholic religious order
- Consecrated life
- Diocesan priest
- Religious minister
- Secular clergy
- Vocational discernment in the Catholic Church

== Sources ==
- Hoge, Dean R. (2002). The first five years of the priesthood: a study of newly ordained Catholic priests. Collegeville, MN: Liturgical Press. p. 3. ISBN 9780814628041.
- Sipe, A. W. Richard (2003). Celibacy in crisis: a secret world revisited. New York: Brunner-Routledge. p. 136. ISBN 9780415944724.
