= Thomas McDonnell (disambiguation) =

Thomas McDonnell (c. 1831–1899) was a military leader in colonial New Zealand.

Thomas McDonnell or McDonell may also refer to:

- Thomas McDonnell Sr. (1788–1864), trader and diplomat in colonial New Zealand
- Thomas John McDonnell (1894–1961), Roman Catholic bishop in the United States
- Thomas McDonnell (bishop) (1912–1987), Roman Catholic bishop in Ireland
- Thomas McDonell (born 1986), actor, musician and artist in the United States

== See also ==
- Thomas Macdonnell, pseudonym used by James Fitz Edmond Cotter (c.1630–1705), Irish soldier and colonial governor
