= Miler Magrath =

Irish prelate (died 1622)

The Most Reverend Miler Magrath
- Archbishop of Cashel
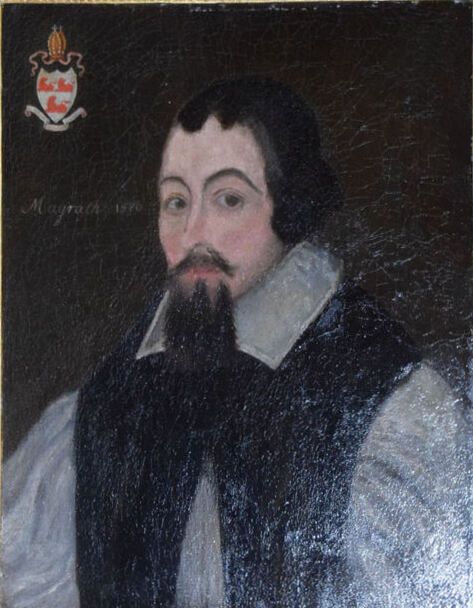
- Native name: Irish: Maolmhuire Mag Raith
- Appointed: 3 February 1571
- Term ended: 14 November 1622
- Predecessor: James MacCawell
- Successor: Malcolm Hamilton
- Previous post: Bishop of Down and Connor (1565–1580)

Orders
- Consecration: 4 November 1565 by Francesco Cardinal Pisani (Roman Catholic)

Personal details
- Born: c. 1523 Fir Manach (Fermanagh)
- Died: 14 November 1622 (aged 98–99)
- Denomination: Catholic / Anglican
- Spouse: (1) Amy O'Meara (2) name unknown
- Children: five sons and four daughters

The Most Rev. Miler Magrath (also Miler McGrath or Myler McGrath, Irish: Maolmhuire Mag Raith; c. 1523 – 14 November 1622) was a senior-ranking Irish prelate born in Carn, in the Gaelic túath of Fermanagh in Ulster, the northern province in Ireland. He came from a family of hereditary historians to the O'Brien clan. He entered the Franciscan Order and was ordained to the Catholic priesthood. The Vatican later appointed him the Bishop of Down and Connor in Ireland, but he converted to the Anglican Church of Ireland, becoming the Protestant Archbishop of Cashel. Magrath is viewed with contempt by both Protestant and Catholic historians, owing to his ambiguous and corrupt activities during the Reformation. He also served as a member of the Parliament of Ireland.

== Early life and Catholic Bishop of Down and Connor ==
Archbishop Magrath was probably born at or near the village of Pettigo in what is now the south-east of County Donegal in Ulster (he was not born at the current Termon McGrath Castle, just outside Pettigo, as that structure was not constructed until circa 1611). At Magrath's birth, and during most of his lifetime, Pettigo and the surrounding 'Termon Magrath' lands, which included St Patrick's Purgatory, were part of Fermanagh (Irish: Fir Manach), a túath or lordship in Gaelic Ireland. Most of Fermanagh later became part of County Fermanagh. Magrath became a Franciscan priest and spent his early life in Rome – "on the Capitoline" – whence he was sent on a mission to Ireland. It was believed that, on passing through England, he displayed his Catholic letters of authorisation to demand bribes for accepting the Reformation. In any case, he appears to have satisfied the authorities that his position as a Catholic bishop in Ireland would not preclude his valid assent to the Act of Supremacy.

In October 1565, Magrath was appointed as the Roman Catholic Bishop of Down and Connor, although the temporalities were ruled over by his kinsman Shane O'Neill, chief of the O'Neill clan, whom he visited in 1566.

In May 1567, he attended on the Lord Deputy of Ireland, Sir Henry Sidney, at Drogheda, where he agreed to conform to the reformed faith and to hold his See from the Crown. In 1569, John Merriman was appointed the Protestant Bishop of Down and Connor: Magrath held on to the Catholic See. Miler went through a harsh experience that affected him greatly and contributed to his enigmatic nature for the rest of his life. He was arrested upon his return to Ireland in the spring of 1569 and imprisoned in London. Throughout his imprisonment, during which he suffered from malaria and was threatened with torture, he refused to convert to Protestantism, but yielded months later, taking the Oath of Supremacy in August 1569, before he was finally deprived of Down and Connor by Rome in 1580 for heresy and other matters; thus he had enjoyed dual appointments as both a Catholic and a Church of Ireland prelate for nine years.

== Anglican Bishop – Clogher and Cashel ==
In 1570, Magrath was appointed by the Crown as the Protestant Bishop of Clogher, including the temporalities, and visited England, where he fell ill of a fever. In February 1571, he was then appointed Archbishop of Cashel and Bishop of Emly (no new appointment was made to Clogher until 1605). In the same year he imprisoned some Franciscan priests at Cashel. In a rage, the rebel crusader James Fitzmaurice Fitzgerald threatened to burn to ashes everyone and everything connected with Archbishop Magrath if they were not released. The friars were immediately liberated by Edward Butler. In 1572 Magrath brought charges against Butler's elder brother, The 10th Earl of Ormonde, but they were given no credence. In 1575, as he went on his way to Dublin, he was attacked and badly injured by the kerne of a hostile clan.

Until the end of the Desmond Rebellions in 1583, Magrath remained in his province, while assisting the English government on the one hand and intriguing with the Catholic rebels on the other. In October 1582, he travelled to England bearing letters of strong recommendation, which cited his ability to provide valuable information on the rebels. He complained that Cashel was only worth £98 and – in spite of the misgivings of William Cecil, Lord Burghley – was granted the See of Waterford and Lismore in commendam, which he held until 1589, and then again from 1592 upon the death of Bishop Wetherhead. Despite his allegiance to the authorities, Magrath never arrested the new Catholic Archbishop of Cashel, Dr Kearney, who lived peacefully under his nose. However, Magrath continued to court favour with the authorities, and in 1584 he did arrest the Catholic Bishop of Emly, Maurice MacBrien, who died two years later in custody in Dublin Castle. In March 1589 he wrote commending the Kerry plantation undertaker Sir William Herbert, who was a controversial figure on the Protestant side.

In 1591 Magrath visited England without leave, and grave charges were pressed against him in his absence. During his visit he sought to convert to Protestantism the condemned Gaelic Prince of Breifne, Brian O'Rourke, who scorned the bishop at the foot of the gallows-ladder before his execution in London. At about this time Magrath's cousin, Dermot Creagh, was the Catholic Bishop of Cork and Cloyne with Legatine authority in Munster, and they remained on mutual terms. Magrath appears to have feared that his soul was in jeopardy, and with a view to repentance and reconciliation with Rome, took care that his cousin would not be captured, while at the same time feeding information to the Crown about his whereabouts.

== Nine Years War ==
In 1596, during the Nine Years War, Archbishop Magrath and the 10th Earl of Ormond were involved in a conference at Faughart with the Northern chiefs, offering them the possession of Ulster, apart from County Louth, Carrickfergus and Newry as these areas were held by English garrisons. The offer was rejected, but was the basis for County Louth being considered part of Leinster from that time forward.

In 1599, Magrath was taken prisoner by Con, son of his kinsman Hugh, 2nd Earl of Tyrone. The earl ordered Magrath's release on the grounds that only the Holy Father had authority to lay hands on his "friend and ally". Magrath promised that he would return to Catholicism, except that he had to see to his children, and Con released him on conditions: a money payment, with O'Meara's son (related to Magrath's wife) to act as surety in person.

In 1600, Magrath went to London and convinced Robert Cecil of his loyalty, although appearing a turbulent person, and was granted a pension. While at court he accused Sir Henry Lee of Ditchley of treason, with the "most indecent and contumelious words", and Lee's cousin, Thomas Lee (a captain in the Irish service who was later hanged for his involvement with the coup attempt of the 2nd Earl of Essex), wrote to Cecil seeking the opportunity to meet the charges.

Magrath returned to Ireland with the English-backed pretender to the earldom of Desmond. He claimed poverty owing to the war, but Cecil soon complained that he was allowing the Anglican Church of Ireland to lie like "an hogsty" and sought Sir George Carew to remonstrate with him over this neglect.

== The New Era ==
Under James I, Magrath's holding of four bishoprics and seventy spiritualities was criticised by Sir John Davies, then attorney-general of Ireland. In 1607, the Archbishop of Dublin, Thomas Jones, criticised his spiritual administration, and Magrath resigned Waterford and Lismore six months later. The estate of Lismore had been sold by him to Sir Walter Raleigh for a nominal price, although he kept the capitular seal of Cashel. He was ultimately compelled to accept the Sees of Killala and Achonry in Connacht, which were of little worth: in 1610, he complained he had not received their possession, and the full grant was not made until 1611.

In 1608, a jury found that he had declared his kinsman, the fugitive rebel Lord Tyrone, wronged over the Bann fishery (a property right relating to the ancient authority of English law in Ireland, which the Crown had successfully contested in a precedent-setting case), and had credited O'Neill with, "a better right to the crown of Ireland than any Irishman or Scottishman [ie. James I] whatsoever". Despite the sensitivity of the matter, the indictment was not proceeded with. In a further assertion of his identity, Magrath rowed with the Bishop of Derry in 1609 over the possession of Termon Magrath, the lands of which were granted in the following year to Magrath's son, James.

Magrath moved to Ulster (where he erected a building, which still stands at Templecrone, County Donegal), and had William Knight appointed his co-adjutor at Cashel; Knight soon left the country after disgracing himself by drunken behaviour in public. It was reckoned that the revenues and manors of the See of Cashel were entirely wasted. The Lord Deputy, Sir Arthur Chichester, had a poor opinion of Magrath, describing him as "stout and wilful", but held back for fear of his influence amongst the Ulster Irish, and Stafford too spoke of his oppressions.

In 1612, the underground Irish Provincial of the Franciscan Order still held out hope of Magrath's reconciliation with Rome; in 1617 it was thought he might exchange the Rock of Cashel for the Capitoline, where he had spent his youth. Magrath's last known involvement in public life was on his attendance at Parliament in Dublin in 1613. He died ten years later, in his 100th year, after 52 years as a bishop.

== Legacy ==
Magrath has remained a figure of controversy in Irish history. On the Protestant side, he is widely blamed for corruption which helped halt the growth of the Reformation in Ireland. On the Catholic side, he was viewed as an apostate priest and a collaborator with a violently Anti-Catholic monarchy.

Magrath married a Roman Catholic, Áine Ni Meara, daughter of John O'Meara of Lisany, in County Tipperary; and had issue, Turlough, Redmond, James, Brian, Marcus, Mary, Cicely, Anne, and Ellis. Upon his wife's death, Magrath remarried.

== In popular culture ==
- Around 1577, a caustic satire against Irish Anglican bishops Magrath, Matthew Sheyn and William Casey, and a fourth no longer recognizable, was composed as Irish bardic poetry by the Franciscan priest-poet Friar Eoghan Ó Dubhthaigh (Owen O'Duffy). In the poem, which begins, Léig dod chomortus dúinn ("No more of your companions for us"), much of the satire aimed at Archbishop Magrath burlesques the fact that his first name, "Maolmhuire", means "The Servant of Mary" in the Irish language, when he had renounced the veneration of the Blessed Virgin in exchange for an earthly wife. The poet suggests that he deserved the name "Maol gan Mhuire" ("The Servant without Mary") much better.

== Bibliography ==
- Richard Bagwell, Ireland under the Tudors 3 vols. (London, 1885–1890).
- Eoghan O'Duffy, tr. by John O'Daly (1864), The Apostasy of Myler Magrath, Archbishop of Cashel, Cashel, County Tipperary.
- John O'Donovan (ed.) Annals of Ireland by the Four Masters 7 vols. (1851).
- Dictionary of National Biography 22 vols. (London, 1921–1922).
- 'Archbishop Magrath: The Scoundrel of Cashel' – 1 Oct 1974 by Robert Wyse Jackson
- Archbishop Miler Magrath: The Enigma of Cashel by Fr. Patrick Ryan (Roscrea, 2014)

Catholic Church titles
Preceded by Eugene Magennis	Bishop of Down and Connor; 1565–1580	Succeeded by Donat O'Gallagher
Church of Ireland titles
Preceded by Hugh O'Carolan	Bishop of Clogher; 1570–1571	Succeeded by George Montgomery
Preceded by James MacCawell	Archbishop of Cashel; 1571–1622	Succeeded by Malcolm Hamilton
Preceded by Marmaduke Middleton (bishop)	Held in commendam the bishopric of Waterford and Lismore; 1582–1589	Succeeded by Thomas Wetherhead (bishop)
Preceded by Thomas Wetherhead (bishop)	Held in commendam the bishopric of Waterford and Lismore; 1592–1608	Succeeded by John Lancaster (bishop)
Preceded by Owen O'Connor (bishop)	Held in commendam the bishopric of Killala; 1613–1622	Succeeded by Archibald Hamilton (Bishop of Killala and Achonry)
Preceded by Eugene O'Hart (bishop)	Held in commendam the bishopric of Achonry; 1613–1622	Succeeded by Archibald Hamilton (Bishop of Killala and Achonry)
