= Hugh Conway =

Hugh Conway may refer to:

- Hugh Conway (novelist) (1847–1885), English novelist
- Sir Hugh Conway (Lord Treasurer) (1440–1518), member of the royal household of king Henry VII
- Hugh Conway (bishop) (1819–1893), Irish prelate
- Hugh E. Conway, professor and expert on labor economics
