= Ardpatrick, County Limerick =

Village in County Limerick, Ireland

Ardpatrick Ard Pádraig
- Village
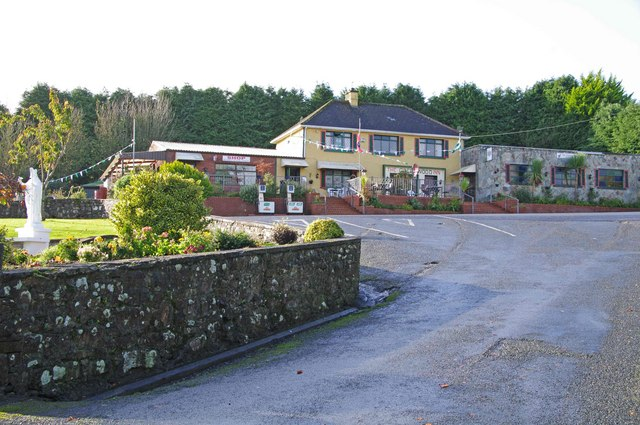
- Road junction and pub in Ardpatrick village

- Location in Ireland
- Coordinates: 52.3413°N 8.5252°W
- Country: Ireland
- Province: Munster
- County: Limerick
- Dáil Éireann: Limerick County
- Eircode routing key: V35
- Dialling code: 063

Ardpatrick (Irish: Ard Pádraig, meaning 'Patrick's height') is a small village in County Limerick, Ireland. It lies at the foot of the north slopes of the Ballyhoura Mountains, on the edge of the Golden Vale. As of the 2006 census, the electoral division of Ardpatrick which contains the village, had a population of 398.

In an area which was anciently known as Tulach na Féinne (Hill of the Fianna), the village comprises a small number of houses around a Roman Catholic parish church. At the south end of the village is a memorial garden and tourist information. Each summer there is a 3-day, "Festival na Fianna". The Greenwood, just to the south of the village, gives access to walking trails across the countryside.

== History ==
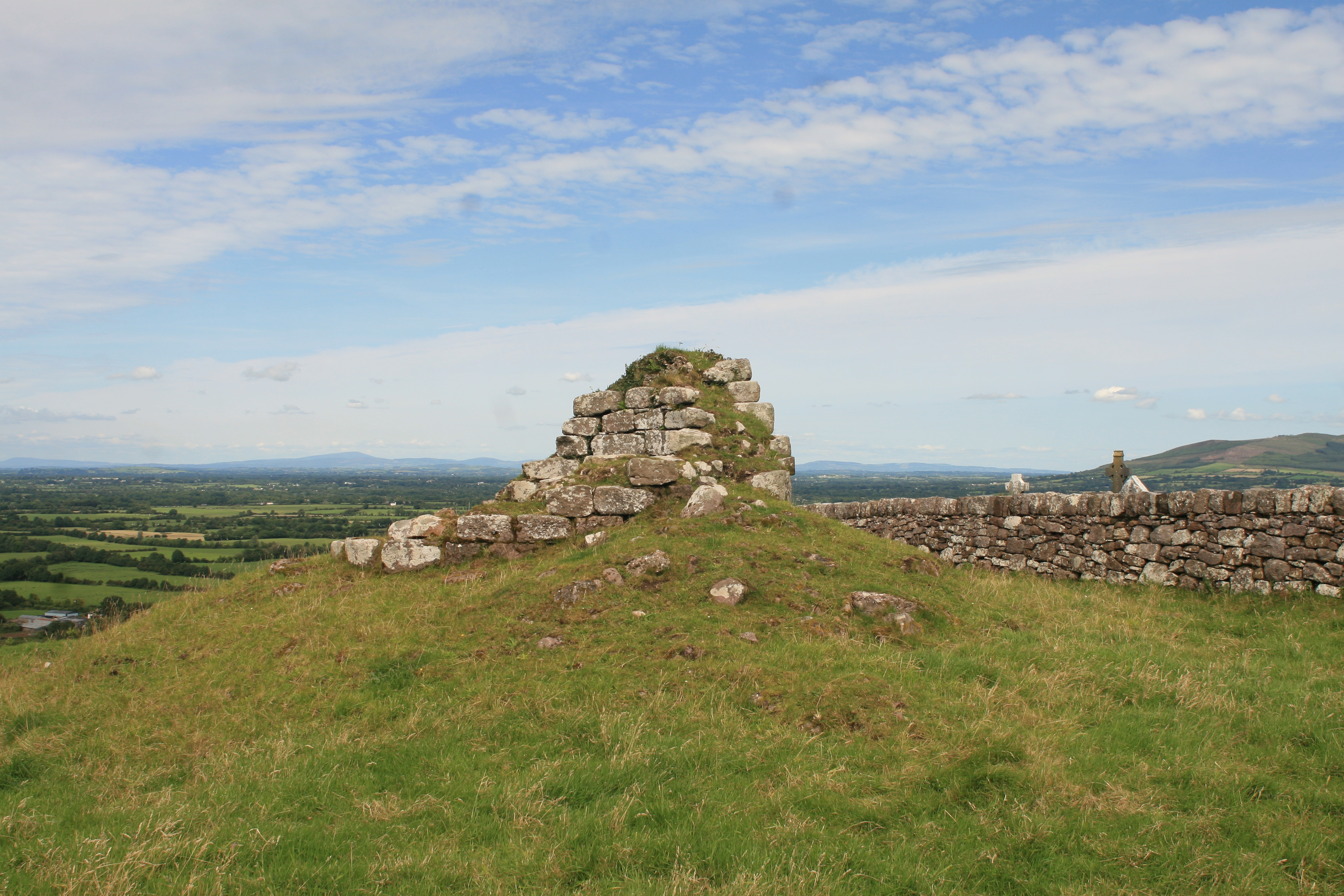
Ruins of early ecclesiastical site above the village

On the hill above the village is the site of a 5th-century monastery and round tower or cloictheach, now in ruins. Legend tells of a peal of 7 silver bells which once hung in the tower. The monastery was reputedly founded by St. Patrick himself, and is surrounded by earthworks probably far more ancient.

From the hill can be seen Castle Oliver, a 19th-century mansion built by the Oliver Gascoignes, an Anglo-Irish family. Its stained glass windows, which feature the life of St. Patrick, have since been restored.

The local parish church, Saint Patrick's Roman Catholic church, was built in 1835 and renovated in the 1920s. Ardpatrick was formerly joined with neighboring parish Kilfinane.

== Notable people ==
- John Fleming, Roman Catholic prelate and current Bishop of Killala, born in Sunville

== See also ==
- List of towns and villages in Ireland
