= Peter Gandolphy =

Peter Gandolphy (26 July 1779 - 9 July 1821) was a Jesuit preacher and apologetic author active in London in the early 19th century.

== Life ==
Gandolphy, was born in London on 26 July 1779, the son of John Vincent Gandolphi or Gandolphy of East Sheen, Surrey, and Anna Maria, daughter of Benedict Hinde of Worlaby, Lincolnshire. He was related by marriage to the Hornyold's of Blackmore.

Gandolfi educated under the Jesuits of the English province, partly at Liège academy and partly at Stonyhurst College, where on 4 October. 1801 he was appointed to teach Humanities. He left Stonyhurst in 1804, and after receiving holy orders was appointed to the mission at Newport, Isle of Wight. Subsequently, he was attached to the Spanish Chapel, Manchester Square, London, where he obtained great celebrity as a preacher.

By the publication of his Liturgy and his sermons "in defence of the ancient faith" he incurred the displeasure of his ecclesiastical superior, Bishop Poynter, who suspended him and denounced his works. Gandolphy proceeded to Rome in order to appeal against the bishop's decision. There he obtained in 1816 official approbations of the two censured works from Stephen Peter Damiani, master of sacred theology and apostolic penitentiary at St. Peter's, and from Francis Joseph O'Finan, prior of the Dominican convent of St. Sixtus and St. Clement. The Sacred Congregation of Propaganda, wishing to terminate the controversy, by letters dated 1 March 1817, required that Gandolphy should be restored to the possession of his former missionary faculties on apologising to Bishop Poynter for whatever might have been disrespectfully stated by him in an address to the public hastily printed some months previously, and of which the bishop had complained to the holy see. Gandolphy accordingly drew up and subscribed an apology on 15 April. In a pastoral letter dated 24 April the bishop declared the apology to be insufficient. On 8 July Gandolphy made a full and unconditional apology in obedience to the bishop's demands.

He never recovered from this humiliation. In 1818 he resigned his chaplaincy at Spanish Place, and retiring to the residence of his relatives at East Sheen, died there on 9 July 1821.

George Oliver says that Gandolphy "wrote too rapidly not to err against theological precision," but John Milner remarks that there was "no heterodox or dangerous principle in his mind."

== Writings ==
- ‘A Defence of the Ancient Faith; or five sermons in Proof of the Christian Religion (London, 1811).
- Congratulatory Letter to the Rev. Herbert Marsh, D.D. … on his judicious Inquiry into the consequences of neglecting to give the Prayer-Book with the Bible. Together with a Sermon on the inadequacy of the Bible to be an exclusive Rule of Faith, inscribed to the same (London, 1812, reprinted in The Pamphleteer (1813), i. 413.) This elicited a reply from Marsh, and several controversial pamphlets.
- A Second Letter to the Rev. Herbert Marsh confirming the opinion that the vital principle of the Reformation has been conceded by him to the Church of Rome (London, 1813, reprinted in The Pamphleteer ii. 397).
- Liturgy, or a Book of Common Prayer, and administration of Sacraments, with other Rites and Ceremonies of the Church. For the use of all Christians in the United Kingdom (London, 1812; Birmingham, 1815).
- A sermon on the text 'Render to Cæsar the things which are Cæsar's, etc. (London, 1813).
- A Defence of the Ancient Faith, or a full Exposition of the Christian Religion in a series of controversial sermons 4 vols., (London, 1813–15)
- Letters addressed to the Archbishop of Canterbury, and the Protestant Clergy of England ... or a Reply to the Calumnies and Slanders advanced against the Catholic Petitioners (London, 1813 and 1817).
- Vetoism illustrated to future generations; or a letter to the editor of the "Ami de la Religion et du Roi", in answer to an article in the same journal (London, 1819).
- Letter to a noble Lord on the conduct of Sir J. Cox Hippisley at Rome (London 1819).
- Lessons of Morality and Piety; extracted from the Sapiential Books of Holy Scripture (London 1822).
