= Conmy =

Conmy is a surname. Notable people with the surname include:

- John Conmy (1843–1911), Irish Roman Catholic prelate
- Liz Conmy (1958–2026), American politician
- Ollie Conmy (1939–2014), Irish footballer
- Patrick Anthony Conmy (born 1934), American judge
