= Donatus Ó Gallchobhair =

Irish Catholic bishop

Most Reverend Donatus Ó Gallchobhair
- Bishop of Down and Connor
- Church: Catholic Church
- Diocese: Diocese of Down and Connor
- In office: 1580–1581
- Predecessor: Miler Magrath
- Successor: Conor O'Devany
- Previous post: Bishop of Killala (1570–1580)

Orders
- Consecration: 5 Nov 1570 by Thomas Goldwell

Personal details
- Died: 1581

Donatus Ó Gallchobhair (died 1581) was a Roman Catholic prelate who served as Bishop of Down and Connor (1580–1581) and Bishop of Killala (1570–1580).

== Biography ==
Ó Gallchobhair was ordained a priest in the Order of Friars Minor. On 4 September 1570, he was appointed during the papacy of Pope Pius V as Bishop of Killala. On 5 November 1570, he was consecrated bishop by Thomas Goldwell, Bishop of Saint Asaph, with William Chisholm, Bishop Emeritus of Dunblane, and Giuseppe Pamphilj, Bishop of Segni serving as co-consecrators. On 23 March 1580, Ó Gallchobhair was appointed during the papacy of Pope Gregory XIII as Bishop of Down and Connor. He served as Bishop of Down and Connor until his death in 1581.

Catholic Church titles
| Preceded by Réamonn Ó Gallchobhair | Bishop of Killala; 1570–1580 | Succeeded by John O'Cahasy |
| Preceded by Miler Magrath | Bishop of Down and Connor; 1580–1581 | Succeeded by Conor O'Devany |
