= Ua Máel Fogmair II =

Irish bishop

Ua Máel Fogmair II was Bishop of Killala until 1151.

Catholic Church titles
Preceded by Ua Máel Fogmair I	Bishop of Killala ?–1151	Succeeded by Ua Máel Fogmair III
