= Patrick O'Boyle (Irish bishop) =

Irish Roman Catholic prelate (1887–1971)

Patrick O'Boyle (2 December 1887 – 25 November 1971) was an Irish prelate who served as Bishop of Killala.

He was born in Ballina, County Mayo, in 1912. He went to St Jarlath's College, Tuam then St. Patrick's College, Maynooth. He was ordained priest on 18 June 1911. He taught at St Muredach's College, becoming Principal in 1920. O'Boyle was appointed Bishop of Killala on 12 December 1950, and received episcopal ordination on 25 February 1951.

Catholic Church titles
Preceded by James Naughton	Bishop of Killala; 1950–1970	Succeeded by Thomas McDonnell
