= Tommaso Feeny =

Irish prelate

Tommaso Feeny (1790–1873) was an Irish prelate who served as Bishop of Killala.

He was born in Clanmorris. Feeny was ordained priest on 10 July 1817. He was appointed titular bishop of Ptolemais in Thebaide on 30 July 1831; and Diocesan Bishop of Killala on 11 January 1848. He died on 9 June 1873.

Catholic Church titles
Preceded by Francis Joseph O'Finan	Bishop of Killala; 1848–1873	Succeeded by John Conmy
