= Donatus (bishop of Killala) =

Irish bishop

Donatus was Bishop of Killala from 1235.

Catholic Church titles
Preceded by Aengus Ó Máel Fogmair	Bishop of Killala; 1235–?	Succeeded by Seoán Ó Laidig
