= Donnchad Ó Flaithbertaig =

Irish bishop

Donnchad Ó Flaithbertaig (also known as Donatus) was Bishop of Killala. Elected on 16 April 1281, he was consecrated on 29 September 1281. He died in February 1306.

Catholic Church titles
| Preceded by Seoán Ó Máel Fogmair | Bishop of Killala; 1199–1206 | Succeeded by John Tankard |
