= Concobhar Ó Duibheannaigh =

Bishop, martyr

The Blessed Concobhar Ó Duibheannaigh, O.F.M.
- Bishop of Down and Connor
- Diocese: Down and Connor
- Appointed: 27 April 1582
- Term ended: 1 (O.S.)/11 (N.S.) February 1612
- Predecessor: Donatus Ó Gallchobhair (bishop)
- Successor: Patrick Hanratty (vicar apostolic)

Orders
- Consecration: 2 February 1583 by Nicolas de Pellevé

Personal details
- Born: Concobhar Ó Duibheannaigh c. 1532 Drumkeen, Raphoe, County Donegal
- Died: 1 (O.S.)/11 (N.S.) February 1612 (aged c. 80) Dublin
- Denomination: Roman Catholic

Sainthood
- Feast day: 20 June
- Venerated in: 6 July 1991
- Beatified: 27 September 1992; Rome by Pope John Paul II

Concobhar Ó Duibheannaigh (c. 1532 – 1 (O.S.)/11 (N.S.) February 1612; Conor O'Devany, Cornelius O'Devany) was an Irish Franciscan priest from Donegal Abbey and Roman Catholic bishop during the religious persecution of the Catholic Church in Ireland that began during the reign of Henry VIII and ended only with Catholic Emancipation in 1829. Similarly to St. Polycarp of Smyrna, Bishop Ó Duibheannaigh was in his eighties when he was hanged, drawn and quartered outside the walls of Dublin. In September 1992, he was formally beatified by Pope John Paul II as one of the 24 officially recognized Irish Catholic Martyrs. His feast day is 20 June.

== Early life ==
Conor O'Devany was born at Malin Head in Inishowen, County Donegal, in Ulster. His family had their seat at Tulach Uí Dhuibheannaigh, near Raphoe in the Laggan district, and were the erenagh family responsible for administering local Church lands on behalf of the Roman Catholic Diocese of Raphoe. Conor O'Devany joined the Observant Franciscans at Donegal Abbey at an early age.

While in Rome, Ó Duibheannaigh was appointed Bishop of Down and Connor by Pope Gregory XIII on 27 April 1582, and consecrated by Cardinal Nicolas de Pellevé on 2 February 1583.

== Execution and martyrdom ==
In 1588, Bishop Ó Duibheannaigh was committed to Dublin Castle. Failing to convict him of any crime punishable by death, Lord Deputy Sir William FitzWilliam sought authority from the 1st Baron Burghley to "be rid of such an obstinate enemy of God and so rank a traitor to Her Majesty as no doubt he is".

In November 1590, he was released on his own petition, although the 1913 Catholic Encyclopedia speculates that this was likely a blanket policy. He was protected by Aodh Mór Ó Néill, Earl of Tyrone, until the Flight of the Earls in 1607. The Bishop escaped arrest until the middle of 1611, when, almost eighty years old, he was taken while administering Confirmation and again committed to Dublin Castle.

His execution was at the personal wish of the then Lord Deputy of Ireland, Sir Arthur Chichester, who was vehemently anti-Catholic, and seems to have been rather against the wishes of the Government as a whole.

On 28 January 1612, Bishop Ó Duibheannaigh was tried for high treason, found guilty by the majority of a packed jury, and sentenced to hanging, drawing and quartering on 1 February (Julian Calendar).

Following his trial and sentencing, according to Philip O'Sullivan Beare, a pious Catholic woman who carried food to the imprisoned Bishop asked about his health. The Bishop replied, "I have not been better these ten years, either in mind or body. My only wish now is that God will vouchsafe to take me to His heavenly kingdom by martyrdom, rather than permit me to be worn out in prison of old age. You, daughter, have done me many services, for which I thank you, as I may, and which God will reward. Do me this further service, I pray: when I am slain (as God grant I may be) have me buried in this", said the Bishop, showing his Franciscan habit. He concluded, "I value this frock, which I put on when I was young, more than the insignia of a Bishop."

He was drawn on a cart from Dublin Castle to the gallows beyond the river; the whole route was crowded with Catholics. Protestant clergymen pestered him with ministrations and urged him to confess he died for treason. "Pray let me be", he answered, "the viceroy's messenger to me here present, could tell that I might have life and revenue for going once to that temple", pointing to the tower of a Church of Ireland parish. He kissed the gallows before mounting, and then proceeding to exhort the Catholics to constancy, he was thrown off, cut down alive, and quartered.

With him suffered Patrick O'Loughran, a priest arrested at Cork. The people, despite the guards, carried off the halter, his clothes, and even fragments of his body and chips of the gallows. They prayed all night by the remains, an infirm man was reported cured by touching them, and Mass after Mass was said there from Midnight until day. Such was the concourse that the viceroy ordered the members to be buried on the spot, but next night the Catholics exhumed them and interred them in St. James's Churchyard. A list of martyrs compiled by Ó Duibheannaigh was used by Bishop David Rothe in his "Analecta".

== Beatification ==
On 27 September 1992, Ó Duibheannaigh, with sixteen others, the Irish Catholic Martyrs, was beatified by Pope John Paul II in Rome. The Feast Day of the Irish Martyrs is celebrated on 20 June.

== See also ==
- Irish Catholic Martyrs

== Bibliography ==
- Fryde, E. B.; Greenway, D. E.; Porter, S.; Roy, I., eds. (1986). Handbook of British Chronology (3rd, reprinted 2003 ed.). Cambridge: Cambridge University Press. ISBN 0-521-56350-X.
- Moody, T. W.; Martin, F. X.; Byrne, F. J., eds. (1984). Maps, Genealogies, Lists: A Companion to Irish History, Part II. New History of Ireland. Vol. XI. Oxford: Oxford University Press. ISBN 0-19-821745-5.
