= Seoán Ó Laidig =

Irish bishop

Seoán Ó Laidig, O.P., was Bishop of Killala, Ireland. Appointed on 22 June 1253, he was consecrated on 7 December 1253. He abdicated on 21 February 1264, and died in 1275.

Catholic Church titles
Preceded by Donatus	Bishop of Killala; 1253–1264	Succeeded by Seoán Ó Máel Fogmair
