= Thomas Finnegan =

Irish bishop (1925–2011)

Thomas Anthony Finnegan (26 August 1925 – 25 December 2011) was the Bishop of Killala, County Mayo, Ireland from 1987 to 2002.

== Life ==
Thomas Anthony Finnegan was born on 26 August 1925, in Castlerea, County Roscommon. He was educated at Runamoat National School and then Summerhill College. He studied for the priesthood in Maynooth College and was ordained priest for the diocese of Elphin in 1951.

He served first as Chaplain at St Angela's College, Sligo before undertaking postgraduate studies in Education and Canon Law.

In 1960 he became Junior Dean at St Patrick's College, Maynooth, and was recalled in 1966 to become President of Summerhill College. He served 13 years as president, overseeing much transformation within the college and is remembered often as a committed, pioneering educator.

In 1979, he was appointed to be Director of the Marriage Tribunal in Galway which adjudicated on annulments In 1982, he became parish priest of Roscommon town and Vicar General.

== Bishop ==
In July 1987 he succeeded Bishop Thomas McDonnell as Bishop of Killala. He was a founder member of the Council for the West along with the other west of Ireland bishops.

In 1998 Bishop Finnegan founded the Newman Institute which offers courses in counseling, theology and spirituality. Also in 2002, Finnegan was succeeded by Monsignor John Fleming. Bishop Finnegan celebrated his Diamond Jubilee in 2011.

== Death ==
He died in Sligo General hospital on Christmas Day 2011, aged 86, and was buried in the grounds of Saint Muredach's Cathedral, Ballina.

== See also ==
- Bishop of Killala

Catholic Church titles
Preceded by Thomas McDonnell	Bishop of Killala; 1987–2002	Succeeded by John Fleming
