= St Muredach's Cathedral, Ballina =

St Muredach's Cathedral
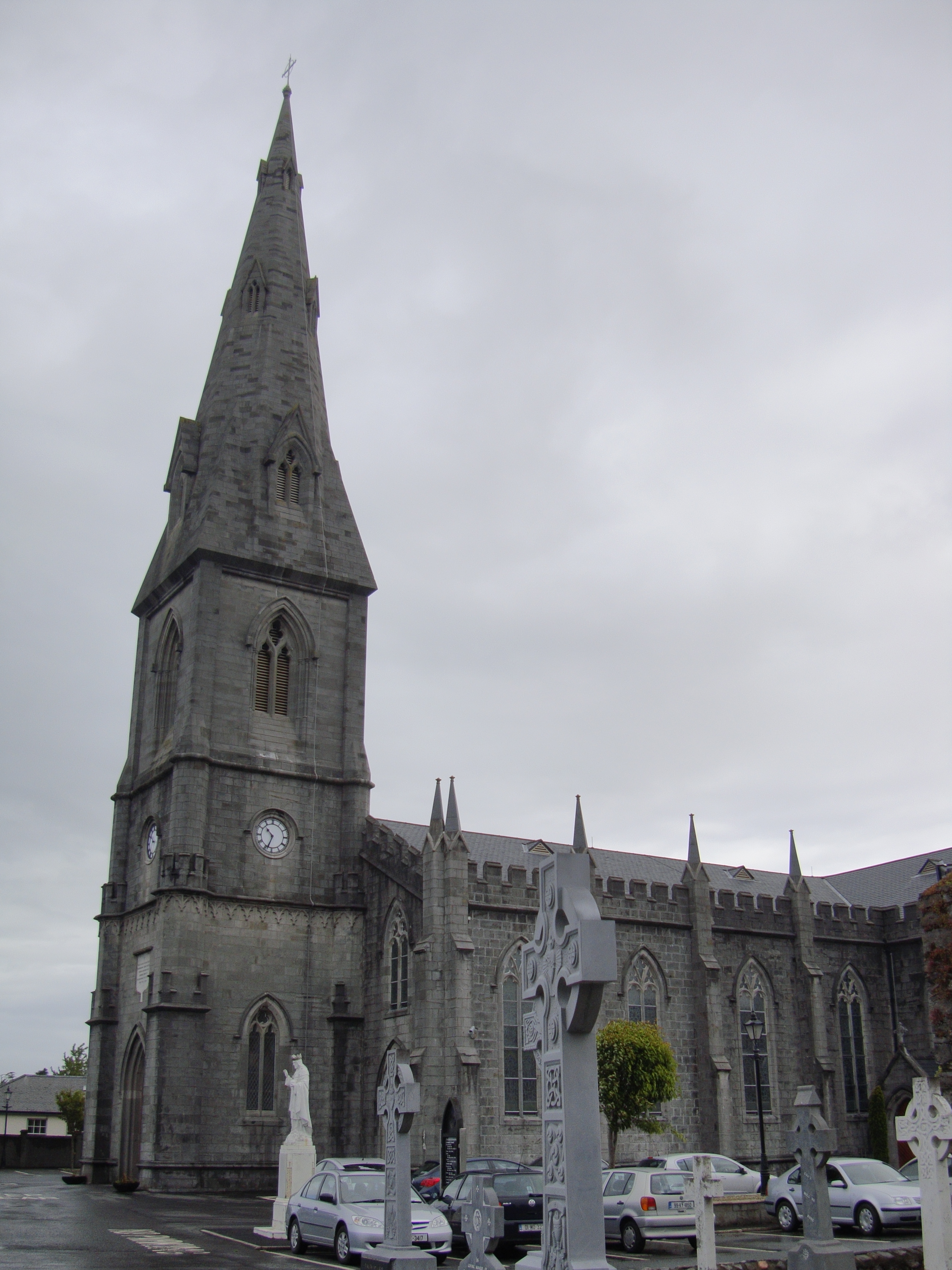
- St Muredach's Cathedral
- 54°06′46″N 9°09′02″W
- Location: Ballina, County Mayo
- Country: Ireland
- Denomination: Roman Catholic
- Website: BallinaParish.org

History
- Dedication: Muiredach of Killala
- Consecrated: 1845

Architecture
- Style: Gothic Revival
- Groundbreaking: 1827
- Completed: 1875

Specifications
- Height: 46.3 m (152 ft)

Administration
- Province: Tuam
- Archdiocese: Tuam
- Diocese: Killala

Clergy
- Archbishop: Francis Duffy
- Bishop: Vacant (Francis Duffy Acting)

St Muredach's Cathedral is the cathedral church of the Roman Catholic Diocese of Killala in Ireland. It is located on the east bank of the River Moy in Ballina, County Mayo. It is also the parish church of the parish of Kilmoremoy.

It is a detached six-bay double-height building on a cruciform plan comprising a four-bay double-height nave which opens into single-bay double-height transepts all centred on a single-bay double-height chancel.

The cathedral's construction was initiated by Bishop John MacHale (1791–1881) who served as the Bishop of Killala from 1825 to 1834 and the completion of the cathedral in 1834 coincided with his translation to the Archdiocese of Tuam.

The spire was completed in 1855 to the designs of the celebrated architect James Joseph McCarthy and further embellishment continued throughout the nineteenth century.

The cathedral is situated in the townland of Abbeyhalfquarter. When built, it was in County Sligo, but since the 1898 revisions of county boundaries, it has been in County Mayo.

== Parish priests ==
=== 18th century ===
- Richard Hoare (1704)
- Francis Beolane (1731)
- John Finan (1743–1760)

=== 19th century ===
- John Lyons (1823–1825)
- John McHale (1825–1834)
- John Lyons (1835)
- P.A. Lyons (1837–1838)
- Patrick McHale (1839–1841)
- Bart Costello (1842–1845)
- Hugh Conway (1845–1848)
- Patrick Malone (1849–1852)
- Dominick Madden (1853)
- Michael Conway (1854)
- J. Gilvarry (1854–1858)
- P.J. Nolan (1859)
- P. Irwin (1862–1867)
- J. Timlin (1867)
- P. Conway (1867–1870)
- H. Hewson (1870–1873)
- J.J. O'Keane (1873–1879)
- P. McNulty (1879–1881)
- D. O'Donoghue (1881–1885)
- A. Finnerty (1885–1890)
- J. Mullen (1890–1891)
- A. McHale (1891–1892)
- M. Gallagher (1892–1900)

=== 20th century ===
- J. Naughton (1900–1906)
- B. Quinn (1906–1913)
- T.L. Beirne (1913–1915)
- M. Tully (1915–1919)
- W. Greaney (1919–1930)
- D. O'Connor (1930–1942)
- M.J. Feeney (1942)
- P. Maloney (1942–1957)
- J. Heverin (1957–1963)
- T. McDonnell (1963–1970)
- G. Moore (1970–1987)
- P. O' Brien (1987–1994)
- M. Flynn (1994–2005)

=== 21st century ===
- M. Flynn (1994–2005)
- Brendan Hoban (2005–2011), a founder member of the Association of Catholic Priests
- Gerard O'Hora (2008–2019)
- Aidan O'Boyle (2019–2023)
- Anthony Gillespie (2023-2024)
- Kieran Holmes (2024-2025)
- Aidan O’Boyle (2025-
