= John Tankard =

Bishop of Killala, Ireland, 14th century

John Tankard (also known as Donatus) was Bishop of Killala.

Formerly, Archdeacon of the diocese he was elected on 13 June 1306, he was consecrated in 1307. He died in 1343.

Catholic Church titles
Preceded by Donnchad Ó Flaithbertaig	Bishop of Killala; 1307–1343	Succeeded by James Bermingham
