= James MacCawell =

Irish Anglican bishop

James MacCawell (Irish: Séamus Mac Cathmhaoil) was the first Anglican Archbishop of Cashel.

He was nominated on 12 February 1567 and appointed by letters patent on 2 October that year. He died in office in 1570.

Church of Ireland titles
Preceded by See vacant	Archbishop of Cashel; 1567–1570	Succeeded by Miler Magrath
