= Richard Barrett (bishop) =

16th-century Irish bishop

Richard Barrett (bishop) (also recorded as Risdéard Bairéad) was an Irish bishop in the first half of the Sixteenth Century.

Barret was a canon of Killala. He was appointed Bishop of Killala by Pope Julius II on 7 January 1513. He died in office during 1545.
