= Matthew Sheyn =

Irish Anglican bishop

Matthew Sheyn, a graduate of Peterhouse, Cambridge, was Bishop of Cork and Cloyne from 1572 until his death 13 June 1582.

== In popular culture ==
- Around 1577, a caustic satire against Irish Anglican bishops Miler Magrath, Matthew Sheyn, William Casey, and a fourth bishop no longer recognizable, was composed as Irish bardic poetry by the Franciscan priest-poet Friar Eoghan Ó Dubhthaigh (Owen O'Duffy). In the poem, which begins, Léig dod chomortus dúinn ("No more of your companions for us"), the bishops are skewered for having renounced veneration of the Blessed Virgin in return for earthly wives, whom Friar O'Duffy then compares in a very unflattering way to the Mother of Jesus Christ.
