= Dominic Bellew =

Irish Roman Catholic prelate

The Most Reverend Dominic Bellew D.D.
- Bishop of Killala
- Church: Roman Catholic
- Diocese: Killala
- Appointed: 1779
- Term ended: 1812
- Predecessor: Alexander Irwin

Orders
- Ordination: 5 March 1771
- Consecration: 3 April 1780

Personal details
- Born: May 1745 County Louth, Kingdom of Ireland
- Died: 16 June 1813 (aged 68)
- Buried: Moyne Abbey, County Mayo, Ireland
- Education: Irish College in Bordeaux

Dominic Bellew (May 1745 – 16 June 1813) was an Irish Roman Catholic prelate who served as Bishop of Killala from 1779 to 1812.

== Early life ==
Bellew was probably born in County Louth in 1745 to a prominent county Catholic family. In around 1764 he was enrolled in the Irish College in Bordeaux, France and he was ordained on 5 March 1771 in Bordeaux. He returned to Ireland early in 1772 and served as a curate in Drogheda. In September 1772, Archbishop Anthony Blake appointed Bellew as parish priest of Dundalk, likely through the influence of his cousin, Sir Patrick Bellew. His appointment was unpopular with the people of Dundalk, whose preference was for a local curate, Peter Carroll, and both priests assumed the position. After several years of petitioning and following an investigation by Archbishop John Carpenter, a compromise candidate, John Markey, was appointed instead.

== Bishop of Killala ==
Bellew subsequently moved to Rome, where he was given a role in the Spanish delegation and acted as an agent for Archbishop Blake. In December 1779, Bellew was appointed Bishop of Killala, possibly owing to an intercession by Henry Benedict Stuart. He was consecrated in Brussels on 3 April 1780. The appointment immediately met with controversy; on 28 February 1784, eighteen local priests sent a petition to Rome protesting against Bellew's appointment. Bellew's friendship with the Anglican bishop, Frederick Hervey, 4th Earl of Bristol, was viewed with much suspicion and his lack of Irish was criticised.

By 1783, Bellew's position in Killala was more stable and he had become a respected figure in the locality. He was an associate of the local magnate, James Cuffe, 1st Baron Tyrawley. In the early 1790s, he oversaw the building of several new Catholic churches in County Mayo. He became concerned by the growing influence of the Catholic Committee, which he deemed to lack hierarchical oversight. Following the Battle of Killala during the Irish Rebellion of 1798, Bellew was summoned to Dublin Castle and forced to defend himself against accusations of sympathy for the Irish rebels; he was found innocent of the accusations. He subsequently became a vocal supporter of the Acts of Union 1800, likely in an effort to demonstrate his loyalty. In 1809, he opposed attempts by Richard O'Reilly to appoint a new Archbishop of Tuam, judging it to be outside his purview. During debates on Catholic emancipation, Bellew opposed the proposal for a government veto on episcopal appointments.

Bellew died on 16 June 1813, having been thrown from his carriage at Mullingar three days earlier while returning from Dublin. He was buried at Moyne Abbey beside his brother shortly thereafter.

Catholic Church titles
Preceded by Alexander Irwin	Bishop of Killala; 1779–1812	Succeeded by Peter Waldron
