= Francis Duffy (bishop) =

Irish Catholic prelate (born 1958)

The Most Reverend, Dr. Francis Duffy D.Ed
- Archbishop of Tuam; Bishop of Killala
- Church: Catholic Church
- Archdiocese: Tuam and Killala
- Appointed: 10 November 2021 (Tuam); 23 February 2026 (Killala)
- Installed: 9 January 2022 (Tuam)
- Predecessor: Michael Neary (Tuam); John Fleming (Killala)
- Other post: General Secretary of the Irish Catholic Bishops' Conference
- Previous posts: Apostolic administrator of Killala; Bishop of Ardagh and Clonmacnoise; Diocesan Secretary, Financial Administrator, Chancellor, Communications Officer and Archivist of the Diocese of Kilmore; Principal of Fatima and Felim's Secondary School; Teacher at St Patrick's College, Cavan

Orders
- Ordination: 20 June 1982 by Francis McKiernan
- Consecration: 6 October 2013 by Seán Brady

Personal details
- Born: 21 April 1958 (age 68) Bawnboy, County Cavan, Ireland
- Parents: Frank and Mary Catherine Duffy
- Education: Trinity College Dublin, National University of Ireland, Maynooth
- Motto: Veni ut vitam habeant (I have come that they may have life)
- Coat of arms

Styles of Francis Duffy
- Reference style: The Most Reverend
- Spoken style: Your Grace
- Religious style: Archbishop

Francis Duffy KC*HS (born 21 April 1958) is an Irish Roman Catholic prelate who has served as Archbishop of Tuam since 2022 and as Bishop of Killala since 2026.

== Early life and education ==
Duffy was born in Bawnboy, County Cavan, on 21 April 1958, the son of Frank Duffy and his wife Mary Catherine (née Dolan). He attended primary school at Munlough National School, Bawnboy, and secondary school at St Patrick's College, Cavan, before studying for the priesthood at St Patrick's College, Maynooth, completing a Bachelor of Philosophy and a Bachelor of Divinity.

Duffy was ordained a priest for the Diocese of Kilmore on 20 June 1982.

== Presbyteral ministry ==
In 1983, Duffy completed a higher diploma in education, and was appointed to teach history, religion and Irish at St Patrick's College, Cavan, where he taught history, religion and Irish. He left the school in 1994 to undertake further study and completed both a Master of Arts in history from the National University of Ireland Maynooth and a Master of Education from Trinity College Dublin.

In 1996 he was appointed principal of Fatima and Felim's Secondary School, Ballinamore.

Duffy was appointed diocesan secretary, financial administrator and chancellor in 2008, as well as communications officer and archivist. He was subsequently appointed resident priest in Laragh the following year, during which time he also completed a doctorate in education.

== Episcopal ministry ==
=== Bishop of Ardagh and Clonmacnoise ===
Duffy was appointed Bishop-elect of Ardagh and Clonmacnoise by Pope Francis on 17 July 2013.

He was consecrated by the Archbishop of Armagh and Primate of All Ireland, Seán Brady, on 6 October in St Mary's Pro-Cathedral, Athlone.

=== Archbishop of Tuam ===
Duffy was appointed Archbishop-elect of Tuam by Pope Francis on 10 November 2021.

He was installed on 9 January 2022 in the Cathedral of the Assumption of the Blessed Virgin Mary, Tuam.

In 2023 Archbishop Duffy was invested as a Knight Grand Officer in the Equestrian Order of the Holy Sepulchre of Jerusalem.

=== Apostolic Administrator of Killala ===
In response to a wider reorganisation of diocesan church leadership in the ecclesiastical province of Tuam, and following the retirement of John Fleming as Bishop of Killala, Duffy was appointed apostolic administrator sede vacante of Killala on 10 April 2024. On 23 February 2026, Pope Leo appointed Duffy as bishop of Killala, uniting the dioceses of Killala and Tuam in persona Episcopi.

Catholic Church titles
Preceded by Colm O'Reilly	Bishop of Ardagh and Clonmacnoise; 2013–2021	Succeeded by Paul Connell
Preceded by Michael Neary	Archbishop of Tuam since 2022	Incumbent
Preceded by John Fleming	Bishop of Killala since 2026	Incumbent
