= Aengus Ó Máel Fogmair =

Irish bishop

Aengus Ó Máel Fogmair was Bishop of Killala from before 1224 until 1234.

Catholic Church titles
| Preceded by Muiredach Ua Dubthaig | Bishop of Killala; 1224–1234 | Succeeded by Donatus (Bishop of Killala) |
