= Muiredach Ua Dubthaig =

Irish bishop

Muiredach Ua Dubthaig (fl. 1208) was Bishop of Killala.

Catholic Church titles
Preceded by Domnall ua Bécda	Bishop of Killala	Succeeded by Aengus Ó Máel Fogmair
