= Conchobhar Ó Coineóil =

Bishop of Killala

Conchobhar Ó Coineóil was Bishop of Killala from 1383 until an unknown date.

Catholic Church titles
Preceded by Thomas Lodowys	Bishop of Killala; 1383–?	Succeeded by Thomas Horwell
