= John Fleming (bishop) =

Irish Roman Catholic prelate

The Most Reverend, Dr. John Fleming DCL
- Bishop Emeritus of Killala
- Church: Roman Catholic
- Diocese: Killala
- Appointed: 19 February 2002
- Installed: 7 April 2002
- Term ended: 10 April 2024
- Predecessor: Thomas Finnegan
- Previous posts: Chairman of Cura; Rector of the Pontifical Irish College; Diocesan Secretary and Financial Administrator of the Diocese of Limerick; Notary at Limerick Marriage Tribunal

Orders
- Ordination: 18 June 1972
- Consecration: 7 April 2002 by Michael Neary

Personal details
- Born: 16 February 1948 (age 78) Ardpatrick, County Limerick, Ireland
- Parents: John J. and Nola Fleming
- Education: Pontifical Gregorian University; Pontifical Irish College; St Patrick's College, Maynooth
- Motto: Veritatem facere in caritate (To do the truth in love)
- Coat of arms

Styles of John Fleming
- Reference style: The Most Reverend
- Spoken style: Your Grace
- Religious style: Bishop

John Fleming (born 16 February 1948) is a former Irish Roman Catholic prelate who served as Bishop of Killala between 2002 and 2024.

== Early life and education ==
Fleming was born in Sunville, Ardpatrick, County Limerick on 16 February 1948, the eldest of five children to John J. Fleming, a farmer, and his wife Nola (née O'Grady). He attended primary school at Ardpatrick National School and secondary school at St Munchin's College, before beginning studies for the priesthood at St Patrick's College, Maynooth, in 1965, completing a baccalaureate in divinity in 1971.

Fleming was ordained a priest for the Diocese of Limerick on 18 June 1972.

== Presbyteral ministry ==
Following ordination, Fleming's first pastoral appointment was as curate in St. Michael’s parish, Limerick, before he was appointed assistant diocesan secretary the following year.

Fleming went to London and Rome in 1974 to complete further studies in matrimonial canon law, attending cursus renovationis at the Pontifical Gregorian University and working in the ecclesiastical tribunal of Westminster. On returning to Limerick in 1975, he was appointed diocesan secretary and notary at Limerick Marriage Tribunal. Fleming was appointed chaplain to the Christian Brothers community on Sexton Street, Limerick, in 1975, and to the Presentation Sisters community on Sexton Street the following year.

In September 1979, he went to study canon law at the Pontifical Gregorian University, completing his licentiate in 1981. Upon his return to Limerick, Fleming was re-appointed Diocesan Secretary, and soon afterwards was appointed Diocesan Financial Administrator.

Fleming returned to Rome in September 1985 to begin doctoral studies in canon law, which he completed in 1997, and was subsequently appointed director of formation in the Pontifical Irish College. He was appointed vice-rector of the college in September 1987 and subsequently rector six years later. During his time as vice-rector and rector, Fleming undertook extensive renovations of the college, which had been constructed in 1926. He also chaired the Irish committee for Jubilee 2000, and was also responsible for the restoration of the Chapel of St Columbanus in the crypt of St. Peter’s Basilica.

Fleming represented the Irish bishops at an Italian church convention in Sicily in 1998. He was an elected representative of the Association of the Rectors of Roman Colleges at the Pontifical Gregorian University, and vice-chairman of PIC-US, the American foundation for the Pontifical Irish College.

Fleming was appointed Prelate of Honour of His Holiness by Pope John Paul II in 1993. He stepped down as rector of the Pontifical Irish College in 2001, and subsequently returned to Ireland, having been appointed parish priest in St Mary's parish, Limerick, on 9 February 2002.

== Episcopal ministry ==
Fleming was appointed Bishop-elect of Killala by Pope John Paul II on 19 February 2002. His initial reaction to the appointment was one of "great surprise", adding that his appointment as parish priest in St Mary's parish, Limerick, coming two days before he learned of his episcopal appointment, "must have been one of the shortest appointments in church history". While there had been considerable controversy among priests in the diocese, who had wanted a greater say in the choosing of a new bishop, Fleming stated that he did not foresee any tensions and that his appointment had been warmly received by the priests of the diocese.

He was consecrated by the Archbishop of Tuam, Michael Neary, on 7 April in St Muredach's Cathedral, Ballina.

Fleming was appointed chairman of Cura, the national episcopal crisis pregnancy agency, in February 2003, and subsequently chairman of the Finance and General Purposes Committee of the Irish Catholic Bishops' Conference (ICBC) in December 2004. He also chaired the National Finance Committee for the 50th International Eucharistic Congress. Fleming currently chairs the advisory committee for the implementation of the Charities Act 2009, the Diocesan Relationship Committee and Episcopal Commission for Planning Communications and Resources. He has also represented the ICBC on the International Commission for Day for Life between 2003 and 2013.

Following the 2017 establishment of a process "to listen carefully in an open manner to the priests, religious and people of the diocese as it plans for the future", Fleming was reported in the Irish Examiner as having given his support for a specially devised delegation process for the ordination of female priests. However, the headline, which claimed that he backed parishioners who wanted female priests, was deemed to be "entirely misleading". Speaking to MidWest Radio on 23 September 2019, the co-ordinator of the listening process, Fr Brendan Hoban, confirmed that while Fleming had agreed to do everything within his remit to sustain the diocese into the future, he had not agreed to ordain women to the priesthood.

Ahead of a referendum on liberalising abortion laws on 25 May 2018, Fleming quoted Pope Francis by saying that true compassion neither marginalises anyone, nor does it humiliate and exclude, but that much less consider the disappearance of a person as a good thing. He called on voters to “pray that Ireland will continue to earnestly support and care for the right to life of the unborn child".

Launching the annual diocesan Society of St Vincent de Paul appeal in 2020, Fleming acknowledged that while poverty was still prevalent in Ireland, it was an issue that was for the most part hidden behind closed doors: “It is there that its dark, insidious presence makes itself felt in cold rooms, bad food, and an atmosphere which dampens mental and physical wellbeing.”

Fleming joined a number of church leaders in the West of Ireland on 16 September 2021, in calling on the Irish government to offer reparations to homeowners whose properties were affected by defective concrete blocks.

== Retirement ==
In accordance with canon law, Fleming submitted his episcopal resignation to the Congregation for Bishops on his 75th birthday on 16 February 2023, but was expected to remain in the see until a successor was appointed.

He remained in the see until the appointment of the Archbishop of Tuam, Francis Duffy, as apostolic administrator on 10 April 2024.
