= William Casey (bishop) =

William Casey was an Anglican bishop in Ireland during the sixteenth century.

Formerly Rector of Kilcornan, he was nominated Bishop of Limerick by King Edward VI on 6 July 1551 and consecrated at Dublin on 25 October 1551. He was deprived by Queen Mary I in 1556 and restored by Queen Elizabeth I on 8 May 1571. He died on 7 February 1591.

== In popular culture ==
- Around 1577, a caustic satire against Irish Anglican bishops Miler Magrath, Matthew Sheyn, William Casey, and a fourth bishop no longer recognizable, was composed as Irish bardic poetry by the Franciscan Friar Eoghan Ó Dubhthaigh (Owen O'Duffy). In the poem, which begins, Léig dod chomortus dúinn ("No more of your companions for us"), the bishops are skewered for having renounced veneration of the Blessed Virgin in return for earthly wives, whom Friar O'Duffy then compares in a very unflattering way to the Mother of Jesus Christ.
