= Ua Máel Fogmair I =

Irish bishop

Ua Máel Fogmair I was the first diocesan Bishop of Killala, until 1137.

Catholic Church titles
Preceded by	Bishop of Killala ?–1137	Succeeded by Ua Máel Fogmair II
