= Thomas Lodowys =

Bishop of Killala, Ireland

Thomas Lodowys (alternatively spelled Lodowis) was appointed Bishop of Killala on 9 August 1381, but did not assume the position. Brian mac Donchadha Ó Dubha had been elected by the Dean and Chapter that same year, but Pope Urban IV had decided to reserve the selection of the bishop to himself, and picked Lodowys instead. Lodowys was a Dominican, and died in 1388.

Catholic Church titles
Preceded by Brian mac Donchadha Ó Dubha	Bishop of Killala; 1381?	Succeeded by Conchobhar Ó Coineóil
