= Domnall Ua Bécda =

Irish bishop

Domnall Ua Bécda was Bishop of Killala from 29 March 1199 to 1206.

Catholic Church titles
Preceded by Ua Máel Fogmair III	Bishop of Killala; 1199–1206	Succeeded by Muiredach Ua Dubthaig
