= Seoán Ó Máel Fogmair =

Irish bishop, 13th century

Seoán Ó Máel Fogmair was Bishop of Killala until 25 October 1280.

Catholic Church titles
Preceded by Seoán Ó Laidig	Bishop of Killala ?–1280	Succeeded by Donnchad Ó Flaithbertaig
