= Ua Máel Fogmair III =

Irish bishop

Ua Máel Fogmair III was Bishop of Killala from 1179.

Catholic Church titles
Preceded by Ua Máel Fogmair II	Bishop of Killala; 1179–?	Succeeded by Domnall ua Bécda
