= Francis Kirwan =

Irish Roman Catholic bishop (1589-1661)

Francis Kirwan (1589–1661) was an Irish Roman Catholic Bishop of Killala.

== Life ==
Kirwan was born in the town of Galway to Matthew Kirwan and Juliana Lynch, both members of The Tribes of Galway. He was educated on the continent, returning to Ireland in 1614 to be ordained a priest. He returned to France the following year, becoming professor of philosophy at Dieppe in 1618.

He returned to Ireland during the 1620s serving as vicar-general from Archbishop Flaithri Ó Maolconaire of Tuam. He returned to France in 1638, remaining at Caen for several years. He settled in Paris, becoming a close friend of Vincent de Paul.

He was consecrated Bishop of Killala in May 1645 at the church of Saint Lazare, Paris; the ceremony was attended by thirteen bishops, fifteen abbots and thirty doctors of the Sorbonne. On his return to Ireland he joined the party of Rinuccini against the Ormonde peace. When the war in Ireland was over he was left a fugitive and was compelled to return to France in 1655.
