= Brendan Hoban =

Irish Catholic priest (born 1948)

- Born: 1948 (age 77–78); Ballycastle, Ireland

Fr. Brendan Hoban (born 1948) is an Irish Catholic priest in the Killala Diocese, columnist and author of a number of books. Fr. Hoban was born in Ballycastle, Co. Mayo in 1948. Educated in Ballycastle Boys National School, St Muredach¹s College, Ballina and entered St Patrick's College, Maynooth in 1966 and was ordained for the diocese of Killala in 1973. He writes a weekly column in the Western People.

He co-presents radio show Faith Alive on MidWest Radio each Sunday.

Fr. Brendan is a founding member of the Association of Catholic Priests.

Fr. Hoban ministered in Ballina and served as Parish Priest in Moygownagh, Co Mayo. He is now retired from parochial work.

== Publications ==
Fr. Hoban has published a number of books.

- 'Turbulent Diocese, The Killala Troubles 1798 - 1848' by Hoban, Fr. Brendan, 2011.
- 'Where do we go from here' by Hoban, Fr, Brendan, Banley House, Dublin, 2013.
- 'A melancholy truth : the travels and travails of Fr Charles Bourke : c. 1765-1820' by Brendan Hoban, Banley House, Dublin, 2008.
- 'A touch of the heart : A memoir' by Hoban, Brendan, 2002.
