= Owen O'Connor =

Irish Anglican priest

Owen O'Connor was an Anglican priest in Ireland in the late 16th and early 17th centuries.

O'Connor was educated at Oxford University. He was Dean of Achonry from 1582 to 1591; and Bishop of Killala from then until his death on 14 January 1607.
