= Hugh Conway (bishop) =

Irish prelate

Hugh Conway (2 February 1819 – 23 April 1893) was an Irish prelate who served as Bishop of Killala.

He was born in Ballycroy, County Mayo. Conway was ordained priest on 22 September 1842. Conway was appointed titular bishop of Achantus on 21 November 1871; and diocesan bishop of Killala on 9 June 1873.

Catholic Church titles
Preceded by Tommaso Feeny	Bishop of Killala; 1873–1893	Succeeded by John Conmy
