= James Naughton (bishop) =

Irish bishop

James Naughton (1865 – 1950) was an Irish prelate who served as Bishop of Killala.

He was born in Ballina, County Mayo. Naughton was ordained priest on 24 June 1889. He was appointed Bishop of Killala on 27 November 1911, and received episcopal ordination on 7 January 1912.

Catholic Church titles
Preceded by John Conmy	Bishop of Killala; 1911–1950	Succeeded by Patrick O'Boyle
