= Réamonn Ó Gallchobhair =

Irish bishop

Réamonn Ó Gallchobhair (a.k.a. Redmond O'Gallagher) was an Irish bishop in the mid 16th century.

Ó Gallchobhair was appointed Bishop of Killala by Pope Paul III on 6 November 1545. He was translated to the Roman Catholic see of Derry by Pope Pius V on 22 June 1569.
