= Francis Joseph O'Finan =

Irish Dominican friar

Styles of Francis Joseph O'Finan, O.P.
- Reference style: The Most Reverend
- Spoken style: My Lord
- Religious style: Bishop

Francis Joseph O'Finan, O.P. (c. 1771–1847) was an Irish Dominican friar who served in the Roman Catholic Church as the Bishop of Killala from 1835 until 1847.

O'Finan was elected Bishop of the Diocese of Killala by the Propaganda Fide on 26 January 1835, which was approved by Pope Gregory XVI on 1 February 1835. His papal brief was issued on 13 February 1835 and consecrated by Cardinal Giacomo Filippo Fransoni on 21 March 1835. However, O'Finan faced strong local opposition from supporters of the previous bishop, John MacHale. These were members of the lower clergy favoured by MacHale and were angered that one of their members had not succeeded MacHale. On 19 November 1838, Pope Gregory XVI approved the decree of the Propaganda Fide to allow O'Finan to retain the title Bishop of Killala, but deprived jurisdiction of the Diocese of Killala. The following year, Tommaso Feeny was appointed Papal Administrator of Killala on 18 July 1839.

Bishop O'Finan died on 27 November 1847, aged 76, and was succeeded by Tommaso Feeny.
