= Bishop of Killala =

Catholic episcopal title in Ireland

catholic
- Incumbent; Francis Duffy; 23 February 2026
- Style: His Lordship / My Lord

Location
- Country: Ireland

Information
- First holder: Ua Máel Fogmair I
- Denomination: Roman Catholic
- Established: 1111
- Cathedral: St Muredach's Cathedral, Ballina
- Bishops emeritus: John Fleming, Bishop of Killala

Website
- killaladiocese.org

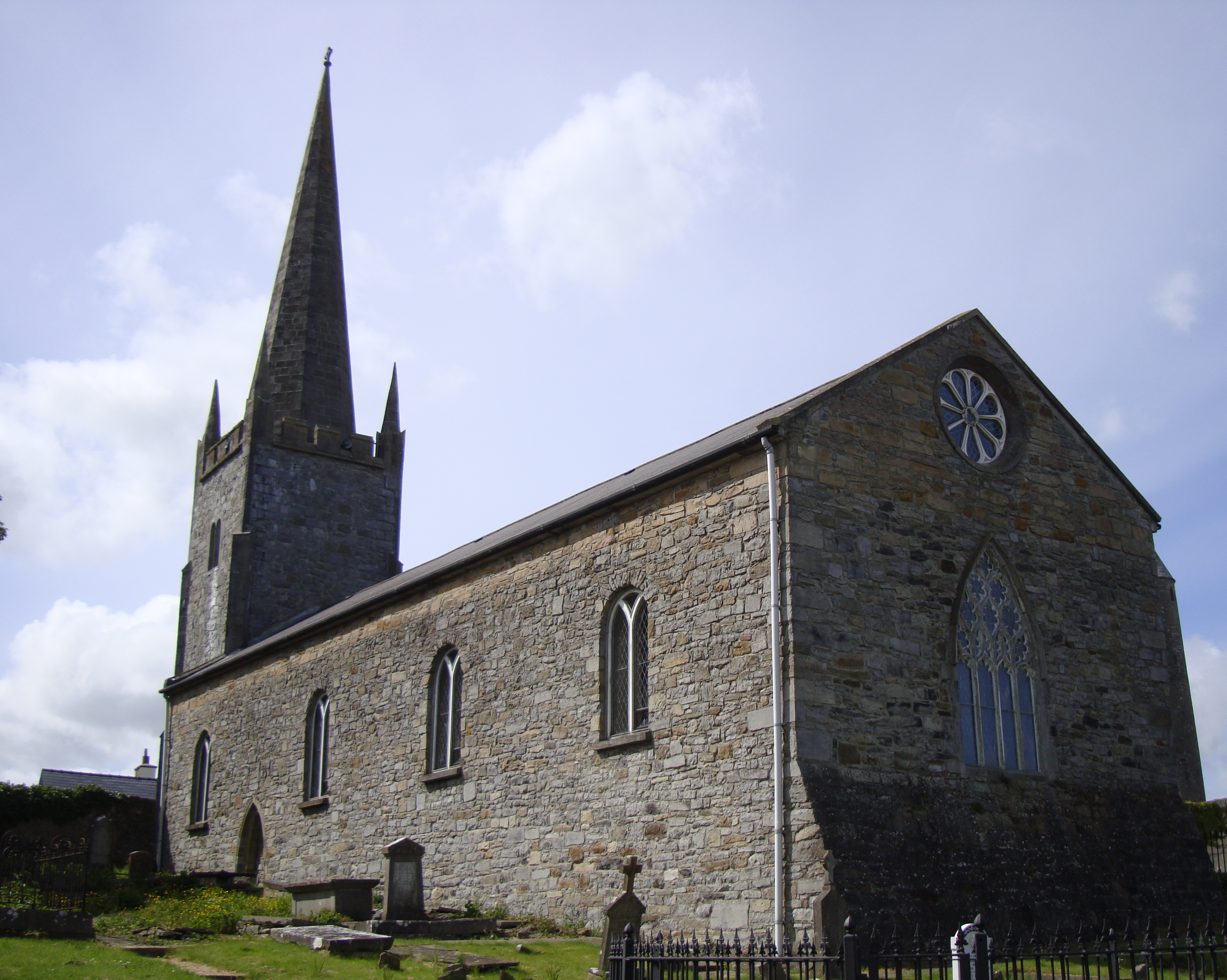
St Patrick's Cathedral, Killala, the episcopal seat of the pre-Reformation and Church of Ireland bishops.

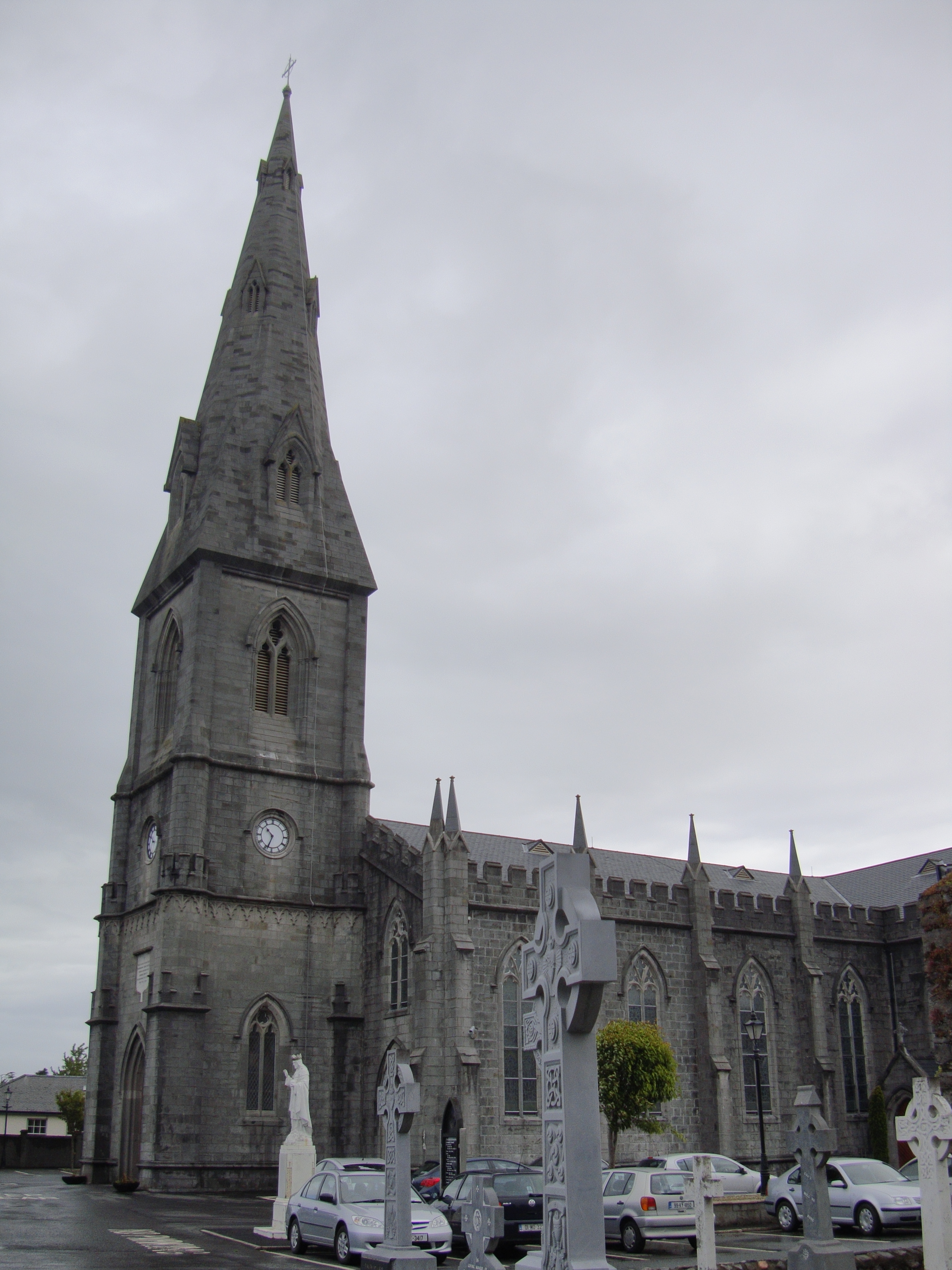
St Muredach's Cathedral, Ballina, the episcopal seat of the Roman Catholic bishops.

The bishop of Killala (Irish: Easpag Chill Ala) is an episcopal title which takes its name after the village of Killala in County Mayo, Ireland. In the Roman Catholic Church it remains a separate title, but in the Church of Ireland it has been united with other bishoprics.

== History ==
The foundation of the Episcopal see of Killala dates to the time of Saint Patrick who had a church built there (Killala Cathedral), over which he placed one of his disciples, Saint Muredach, as its first bishop. Another of early bishop is believed to have been Saint Cellach of Killala. The see was often called the bishopric of Uí Fiachrach Muaidhe or Tir Amalghaid (Tirawley) in the Irish annals. Although the bishopric was founded in the 5th century, it wasn't until AD 1111 that the Diocese of Killala was established by the Synod of Ráth Breasail. Its boundaries comprises the north-eastern portion of County Mayo and the barony of Tireragh in County Sligo. After Bishop Ó Coineóil was restored in 1439, there were a number of rival candidates who were appointed but never took effect.

After the Reformation, there were parallel apostolic successions: one of the Church of Ireland and the other of the Roman Catholic Church.

In the Church of Ireland, Killala continued as a separate title until 1622 when it was combined with Achonry to form the united bishopric of Killala and Achonry. Under the Church Temporalities (Ireland) Act 1833 (3 & 4 Will. 4. c. 37), the combined sees of Killala and Achonry became part of the archbishopric of Tuam in 1834. On the death of Archbishop Le Poer Trench in 1839, the Ecclesiastical Province of Tuam lost its metropolitan status and became the united bishopric of Tuam, Killala and Achonry in the Ecclesiastical Province of Armagh.

In the Roman Catholic Church, Killala remains a separate title. The bishop's seat (cathedra) is located at the Cathedral Church of St Muredach in Ballina, County Mayo. The most recent ordinary is the Most Reverend John Fleming, Bishop of the Roman Catholic Diocese of Killala, who was appointed by Pope John Paul II on 19 February 2002, received episcopal ordination on 7 April 2002 and retired on 10 April 2024. On 23 February 2026, Pope Leo appointed Duffy as bishop of Killala, uniting the dioceses of Killala and Tuam in persona Episcopi.

== Pre-Reformation bishops ==
The following is a list of the diocesan bishops of Killala:

Pre-Reformation Bishops of Killala
From	Until	Ordinary	Notes
unknown	1137	Ua Máel Fogmair I	Died in office.
unknown	1151	Ua Máel Fogmair II	Died in office.
bef.1179	unknown	Ua Máel Fogmair III	Became bishop before 1179. Date of death unknown.
1199	1206	Domnall ua Bécda	Also known as Donatus. Became bishop before 29 March 1199. Died in office.
fl. 1208	unknown	? Muiredach Ua Dubthaig	Mentioned in the Annals of Loch Cé, 1208, where the context suggests that his see may have been Killala.
bef.1224	1234	Aengus Ó Máel Fogmair	Also known as Elias. Became bishop before 1224. Died in office.
1235	unknown	Donatus	Became bishop in 1235 and recorded fl. 7 September 1244. Date of death unknown.
1253	1264	Seoán Ó Laidig, O.P.	Elected after 22 June 1253 and consecrated on 7 December 1253. Resigned after 21 February 1264 and died in 1275.
unknown	1280	Seoán Ó Máel Fogmair	Died on 25 October 1280.
1281	1306	Donnchad Ó Flaithbertaig	Also known as Donatus. Elected before 16 April 1281 and received possession of the temporalities on 29 September 1281. Died circa February 1306.
1307	1343	John Tankard	Also known as Seoán Ó Laithim. Formerly Archdeacon of Killala. Elected bishop on 13 June 1306 and received possession of the temporalities after that date, and consecrated circa 1307. Died in office.
1344	c.1346	James Bermingham	Formerly a canon of Killala. Elected and consecrated in 1344. Died in office circa 1346.
1347	1350	Uilliam Ó Dubhda	Also known as William O'Dowda. Elected in 1344, appointed on 26 June 1346, and received possession of the temporalities on 25 March 1348. Died in office.
1351	1383	Robert Elyot	Formerly Bishop of Waterford. Appointed on 8 June 1351. Deprived by Antipope Clement VII before 17 January 1383. Died before January 1390.
1351	1383	(Brian mac Donchadha Ó Dubha)	Elected by the dean and chapter, but it does not appear to be confirmed or consecrated.
1381		(Thomas Lodowys, O.P.)	Appointed on 9 August 1381, but did not take office. Died towards the end of 1388
1383	unknown	Conchobhar Ó Coineóil	Also known as Cornelius. Formerly a canon of Tuam. Appointed by Antipope Clement VII before 19 February 1383. Not known when his episcopate ended, but died in 1422 or 1423.
1390	1398	Thomas Orwell, O.F.M.	Also known as Thomas Horwell. Appointed on 31 January 1390. Acted as a suffragan bishop in the dioceses of Ely and Norwich 1389–1406. Translated to Dromore before November 1398.
1398	1400	See vacant	
1400	1425	Tomás mac Uilliam Duibh Bairéad	Also known as Thomas Barrett or 'an t-easbog Tóimineach'. Appointed before 14 April 1400 and received possession of the temporalities on 12 March 1401. Died in office on 25 January 1425.
c. 1403		(Muircheartach Cléirach mac Donnchadha Ó Dubhda)	Elected circa 1403, but was never consecrated, and died later in the same year.
1425	1431/32	Fearghal Ó Martain, O.E.S.A.	Appointed on 26 September 1425 and consecrated on 11 November 1427. Died in office on 30 January 1431 or 1432.
1431		Thaddaeus 'Mac Creagh'	Appointed, by provision of the Pope; and was pardoned for accepting the appointment, and was admitted to all the privileges of an English subject, by King Henry VI in September 1431.
1432	1436	Brian Ó Coineóil	Also known as Bernardus. Appointed on 30 January 1432. Deposed in 1436.
1436	1436	Maghnus Ó Dubhda	Formerly Archdeacon of Killala. Elected bishop in 1436. Died in office on 22 February 1436.
1436	1439	See vacant	
1439	1461	Brian Ó Coineóil (again)	Restored in 1439. Murdered on 31 May 1461 by the son of Bishop Maghnus Ó Dubhda.
1447		(Robert Barrett)	Provost of Killala. Appointed bishop on 3 July 1447, but did not take effect.
1452		(Ruaidhrí Bairéad, O.E.S.A.)	Also known as Rory Barrett. Appointed on 3 March 1452, but did not take effect. Died after May 1458.
1453		(Thomas)	Appointed before 7 January 1453, but did not take effect.
1459		(Richard Viel, O.Carth.)	Prior of Witham Friary. Appointed on 17 October 1459, but did not take effect.
1461	1467	Donatus Ó Conchobhair, O.P.	Formerly a friar of Rathfran (a friary north of Killala). Appointed on 2 December 1461. Died in office after 1467.
1467	1470	See vacant	
1470	unknown	Thomas Barrett, O.S.A.	Also known as Tomas Bairéad. Formerly a canon of Crossmolina. Appointed bishop on 9 February 1470. Acted as a suffragan bishop in the English Diocese of Ely in 1497. Died after 1497.
1487	1490	Seaán Ó Caissín, O.F.M.	Also known as John O'Cassin and Johannes de Tuderto. Appointed bishop on 18 January 1487. Resigned in 1490.
1490	1500	See vacant	
1500	1505	Thomas Clerke	Also known as Thomas Cleragh. Formerly Archdeacon of Sodor (Isle of Man). Appointed bishop on 4 May 1500. Resigned in 1505, becoming Rector of Chedsey in Somerset, where died there in 1508.
1505	1508	See vacant	
1508	bef.1513	Malachias Ó Clúmháin	Formerly a priest of the Diocese of Clonfert. Appointed on 12 February 1506 and consecrated on 3 September 1508. Died in office before 1513.

== Bishops during the Reformation ==
Bishops of Killala during the Reformation
From	Until	Ordinary	Notes
1513	1545	Richard Barrett	Also known as Risdéard Bairéad. Formerly a canon of Killala. Appointed bishop by Pope Julius II on 7 January 1513. Not known if Barrett acknowledged Royal supremacy. Died in office before 6 November 1545.
1545	1569	Redmond O'Gallagher	Appointed by Pope Paul III on 6 November 1545 and presumably recognized by the crown in the reign of Queen Mary I. Translated to the Roman Catholic see of Derry by Pope Pius V on 22 June 1569. Described by the papal legate Fr David Wolfe SJ as 'as strong as [a] bulwark of the Bride of Christ' in an account of approximately 1573

== Post-Reformation bishops ==
=== Church of Ireland succession ===
Church of Ireland Bishops of Killala
From	Until	Ordinary	Notes
1569	1591	See vacant	
1591	1607	Owen O'Connor	Formerly Dean of Achonry. Nominated on 18 October 1591 and consecrated before 25 March 1592. Died in office on 14 January 1607.
1607	1613	See vacant	
1613	1622	The see was granted in commendam to Miler Magrath, Archbishop of Cashel.	
1622	1834	Part of the united bishopric of Killala and Achonry	
1834	1839	Part of the archbishopric of Tuam	
Since 1839		Part of the united bishopric of Tuam, Killala and Achonry	

=== Roman Catholic succession ===
Roman Catholic Bishops of Killala
From	Until	Ordinary	Notes
1570	1580	Donat O'Gallagher, O.F.M.	Also known as Donagh O'Gallagher. Appointed on 4 September 1570 and consecrated on 5 November 1570. Translated to Down and Connor on 23 March 1580
1580	1583	John O'Cahasy, O.F.M.	Appointed on 27 July 1580. Died in office in October 1583.
1583	1591	See vacant	
1591	unknown	(Miler Cawell, vicar apostolic)	Appointed vicar apostolic by papal brief on 15 May 1591 (N.S.).
1629	unknown	(Andrew Lynch, vicar apostolic)	Appointed vicar apostolic by papal brief on 28 November 1629 (N.S.).
1645	1661	Francis Kirwan	Appointed by papal bull on 6 February 1645 (N.S.) and consecrated at Paris on 7 May 1645 (N.S.). Returned to Ireland, but following the fall of Galway in 1651, he hid from Parliamentarian troops for many months, eventually imprisoned in Galway and then banished to France in August 1655. Died in exile at Rennes on 27 August 1661.
1661	1671	See vacant	
1671	unknown	(John Burke, vicar apostolic)	Also recorded as John de Burgo. Appointed vicar apostolic on 16 May 1671 (N.S.) and papal brief issued on 30 June 1671 (N.S.).
1676	unknown	(John Dooley, vicar apostolic)	Appointed vicar apostolic on 22 April 1676 (N.S.).
1695		(Ambrose O'Madden)	Nominated to be bishop of Killala, and apostolic administrator of Kilmacduagh, on 30 August 1695 (N.S.), but did not take effect. Later appointed Bishop of Kilmacduagh in 1703, but remained unconsecrated. Finally, appointed Bishop of Clonfert in 1713 and consecrated in 1714.
1695	1703	See vacant	
1703	1735	Thaddeus Francis O'Rourke, O.F.M.	Also known as Tadhg O'Rourke. Appointed on 15 November 1703 (N.S.) and again on 15 March 1707 (N.S.). Consecrated on 24 August 1707. Died in office before September 1735.
1735	1738	Peter Archdekin, O.F.M.	Appointed by papal brief on 30 September 1735 (N.S.) and consecrated on 5 February 1736 (N.S.). Died in office in 1738.
1739	1743	Bernard O'Rourke	Appointed by papal brief on 24 April 1739 (N.S.). Died in office before 8 July 1743 (N.S.).
1743	1748	John Brett, O.P.	Appointed by papal brief on 27 July 1743 (N.S.) and consecrated on 8 September 1743 (N.S.). Translated to Elphin on 28 August 1748 (N.S.).
1749	1749	Michael Skerrett	Appointed by papal brief on 23 January 1749 (N.S.). Translated to Tuam on 5 May 1749 (N.S.).
1749	1760	Bonaventura MacDonnell, O.F.M.	Appointed by papal brief on 7 May 1749 (N.S.). Died in office before 16 September 1760.
1760	1776	Philip Phillips	Appointed by papal brief on 24 November 1760 (N.S.). Translated to Achonry on 22 June 1776.
1776	1779	Alexander Irwin	Appointed on 16 June 1776 and papal brief issued on 1 July 1776. Died in office before 25 September 1779.
1779	c. 1812	Dominic Bellew	Appointed on 5 December 1779, papal brief issued on 18 December 1779, and consecrated in 1780. Died in office circa 1812.
1812	1814	See vacant	
1814	1834	Peter Waldron	Appointed on 25 September 1814, papal brief issued on 4 October 1814, and consecrated on 24 February 1815. Died in office on 20 May 1834.
1834		John MacHale	Appointed coadjutor bishop (with right of succession) on 20 February 1825, papal brief issued on 8 March 1825, and consecrated on 5 June 1825. Succeeded diocesan bishop on 27 May 1834. Translated to Tuam on 21 July 1834.
1835	1847	Francis Joseph O'Finan, O.P.	Appointed on 1 February 1835, papal brief issued on 13 February 1835, and consecrated 21 March 1835. Allowed to retain the title Bishop of Killala on 19 November 1838, but was deprived jurisdiction of the Diocese of Killala. Died on 27 November 1847.
1848	1873	Tommaso Feeny	Also known as Thomas Feeny. Appointed Papal Administrator of Killala on 18 July 1839 and consecrated Titular Bishop of Ptolemais in Phoenicia on 13 October 1839. Appointed Diocesan Bishop of Killala on 12 December 1847 and papal brief issued on 11 January 1848. Died in office on 9 August 1873.
1873	1893	Hugh Conway	Appointed coadjutor bishop (with right of succession) on 21 November 1871 and consecrated on 4 February 1872. Succeeded diocesan bishop on 9 July 1873. Died in office on 23 April 1893.
1893	1911	John Conmy	Appointed coadjutor bishop (with right of succession) on 25 May or June 1892 and consecrated on 24 August 1892. Succeeded diocesan bishop on 23 April 1893. Died in office on 26 August 1911.
1911	1950	James Naughton	Appointed on 27 November 1911 and consecrated on 7 January 1912. Died in office on 16 February 1950.
1950	1970	Patrick O'Boyle	Appointed on 12 December 1950 and consecrated on 25 February 1951. Retired on 12 October 1970 and died on 25 November 1971.
1970	1987	Thomas McDonnell	Appointed on 12 October 1970 and consecrated on 13 December 1970. Retired on 21 January 1987 and died on 9 December 1987.
1987	2002	Thomas Anthony Finnegan	Appointed on 3 May 1987 and consecrated on 12 July 1987. Retired on 19 February 2002 and died on 25 December 2011.
2002	2024	John Fleming	Appointed on 19 February 2002 and consecrated on 7 April 2002. Retired on 10 April 2024.
2026		Francis Duffy	Appointed on 23 February 2026.
