= Muiredach of Killala =

Irish bishop and saint

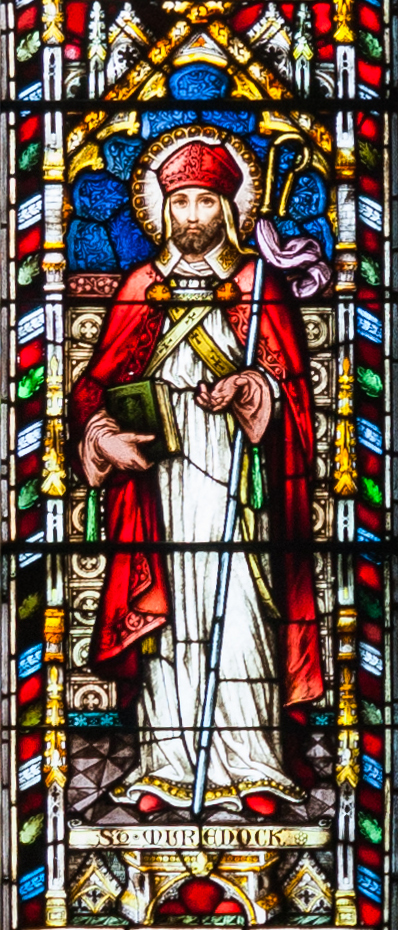
- Saint Muiredach as depicted in the east window of St Muredach's Cathedral, Ballina, created by Franz Mayer & Co.
- Born: Muiredach mac Echdach
- Feast: 12 August

Saint Muiredach mac Echdach, also known as Murtagh, was the founding Bishop of Killala, Ireland in the 6th century.

== Life ==
Muiredach was of the Cenél Lóegairi, and connected to the royal family of King Lóegaire mac Néill.

He is described as an old man of Patrick's family, and was placed at the head of the Church of Killala by St. Patrick, as early as 442 or 443. The connection with Patrick doesn't reconcile with Muiredach's being active in the late 6th century, and probably reflects Armagh's interests in Killala.

He appears active in County Sligo, and allegedly met with St. Columba in the year 575, in a town called Ballysadare.

He likely retired to an island off the Sligo coast in Donegal Bay to an uninhabited island, Inishmurray, that bears his name. He may also be a patron of the monastery on that island founded by Laisrén mac Decláin. Muiredach died there as a hermit, and his feast day is 12 August.

St Muredach's Cathedral, Ballina is the cathedral church of the Roman Catholic Diocese of Killala.
