= John Conmy =

Irish prelate

John Conmy (10 February 1843 – 26 August 1911) was an Irish prelate who served as Bishop of Killala.

He was born in Corbally, County Mayo. Conwy was ordained priest on 10 January 1866. Conmy was appointed titular bishop of Germanicopolis on 25 May 1892; and Diocesan Bishop of Killala on 27 November 1911.

Catholic Church titles
Preceded by Hugh Conway	Bishop of Killala; 1893–1911	Succeeded by James Naughton
