= Thomas McDonnell (bishop) =

Irish prelate

Thomas McDonnell (8 November 1912 – 9 December 1987) was an Irish prelate who served as Bishop of Killala.

He was born in Ballycastle, County Mayo, in 1912. He went to St Patrick's College, Maynooth, in 1930, where he earned a First Class Honours degree in classics.

== Priestly ministry ==
He was ordained priest on 23 June 1937. Two of his classmates ordained on the same day would also serve as Irish bishops, William Cardinal Conway and Patrick Mulligan. All three entered Maynooth's Dunboyne Institute, and in 1939 McDonnell was awarded a Doctorate of Divinity on the topic of Mass Stipends.

His first pastoral appointment was as Diocesan Examiner which necessitated him travelling throughout the primary schools of the small diocese, examining the catechetical learning of the children to be presented for confirmation, and supporting teachers who were giving this instruction. He was appointed Administrator of the Diocesan Cathedral in 1961, and two years later Parish Priest of Dromore West in County Sligo.

== Episcopal ministry ==
McDonnell was appointed Bishop of Killala on 12 October 1970, and received episcopal ordination from the hands of his erstwhile classmate William Cardinal Conway on 13 December 1970. McDonnell retired on 21 January 1987.

Shortly after his retirement, a meeting of the clergy of Killala was convened at which a ten-point plan was issued outlining their hopes for pastoral changes in the diocese.

== Death ==
McDonnell died on 9 December 1987 at age 75, less than a year after retiring as bishop.
