= R282 road (Ireland) =

Road in County Leitrim, Ireland

R282 road
- Bóthar R282
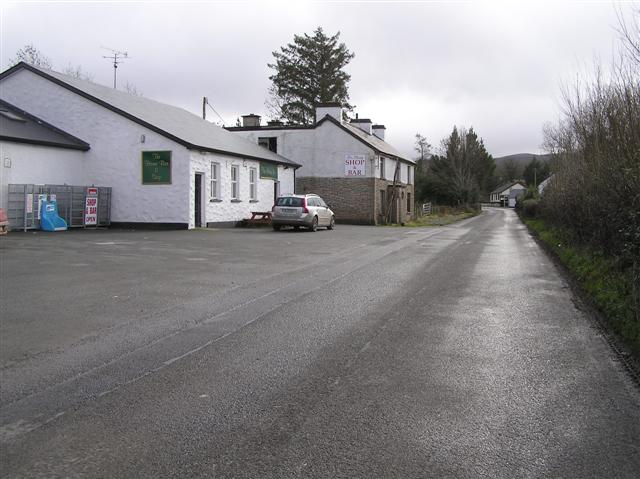
- R282 in Rossinver

Route information
- Length: 13.4 km (8.3 mi)

Major junctions
- From: N16 at Manorhamilton, County Leitrim
- R281 at Conray; R281 at Gubalaun
- To: County Fermanagh border at Dooard

Location
- Country: Ireland

Highway system
- Roads in Ireland; Motorways; Primary; Secondary; Regional
← R281	→ R283

The R282 road is a regional road in County Leitrim, Ireland connecting the N16 in Manorhamilton with Rossinver (links R281 to Kinlough/Glenfarne) and across the border around Lough Melvin becoming the B53 to Garrison, County Fermanagh.

== See also ==
- Regional road
