= List of national monuments in County Leitrim =

The Irish state has officially approved the following list of national monuments in County Leitrim. In the Republic of Ireland, a structure or site may be deemed to be a "national monument", and therefore worthy of state protection, if it is of national importance. If the land adjoining the monument is essential to protect it, this land may also be protected.

== National Monuments ==
NM#	Monument name	Description	Image	Townland	Location
477	Aghaderrard Court Tomb	Court Tomb		Aghaderrard West	54°26′06″N 8°14′20″W
68	Fenagh Churches	Churches		Fenagh	54°01′05″N 7°50′06″W
405	Corracloona Court Tomb	Megalithic Tomb		Corracloona	54°20′05″N 8°00′16″W
69	Creevelea Abbey	Friary (Franciscan)		Creevelea	54°13′53″N 8°18′35″W
390	Parke's Castle	Castle		Dromahair	54°15′53″N 8°20′04″W
508	Seán Mac Diarmada's House	House with historical associations		Kiltyclogher	
653	Worm Ditch (Black Pig's Dyke)	Linear Earthwork		Lattone, Gortnaderrary	54°22′45″N 8°04′12″W

== Sources ==
- National Monuments in County Leitrim
