= R281 road (Ireland) =

Road in County Leitrim, Ireland

R281 road
- Bóthar R281
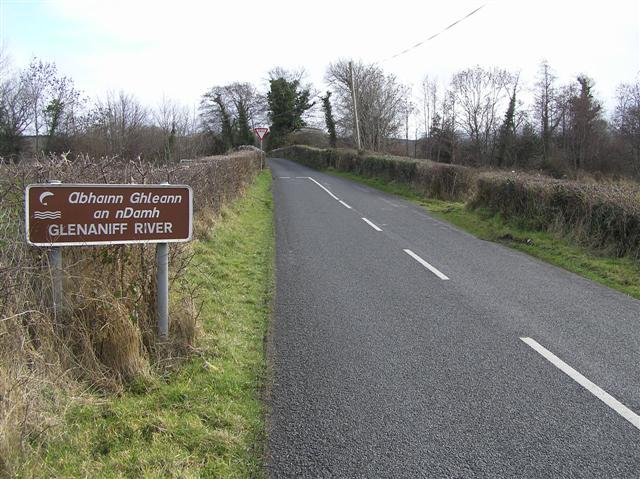
- At the Glenaniff River in Tawnaleck, County Leitrim

Route information
- Length: 30.6 km (19.0 mi)

Major junctions
- From: R280 in Kinlough
- Joins R282 to Manorhamilton; Leaves R282 at Rossinver; R283 at Kiltyclogher
- To: N16 at Glenfarne

Location
- Country: Ireland
- Primary destinations: County Leitrim; Kinlough; Buckode; Rossinver; Kiltyclogher; Glenfarne

Highway system
- Roads in Ireland; Motorways; Primary; Secondary; Regional
← R280	→ R282

The R281 road is a regional road in Ireland linking Kinlough and Glenfarne in County Leitrim.

From Kinlough the road passes along the south shore of Lough Melvin before joining the R282 near Rossinver. After about 1 km (0.6 mi) the R281 leaves the R282 towards Kiltyclogher. In Kiltyclogher, a monument to Seán Mac Diarmada, a leader of the 1916 Easter Rising, occupies the roundabout junction with the R283. From here the road continues southeast to end in Glenfarne. The road is 30.8 km (19.1 mi) long.

== See also ==
- Roads in Ireland
