= Loughtee Lower =

Barony in County Cavan, Ireland

Loughtee Lower Lucht Tí Íochtarach (Irish)
- Barony
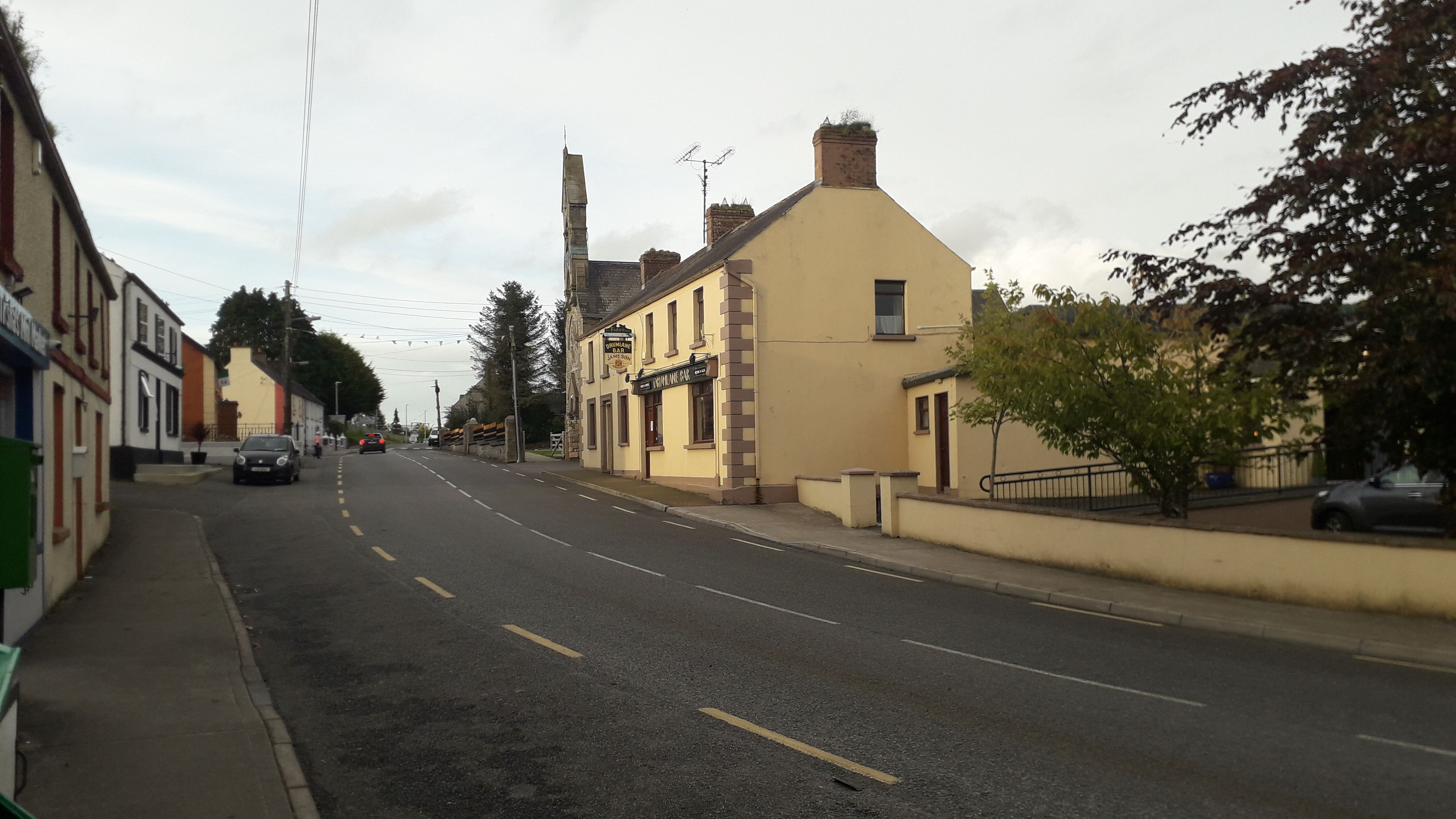
- Centre of Milltown, County Cavan

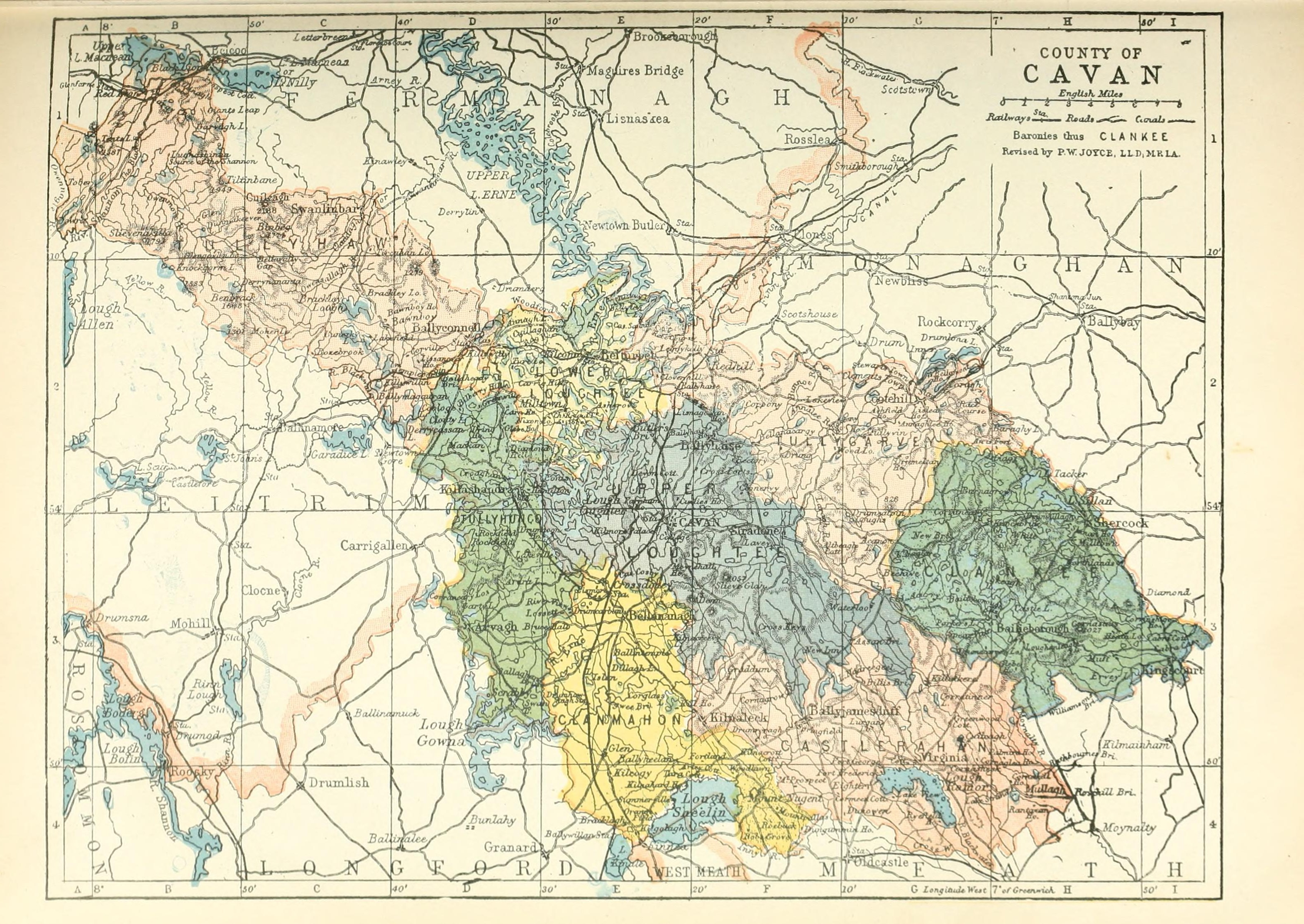
- Barony map of County Cavan, 1900; Loughtee Lower is in the north, coloured pale yellow.
- Sovereign state: Ireland
- Province: Ulster
- County: Cavan

Area
  - Total: 114.28 km^{2} (44.12 sq mi)

Loughtee Lower (Irish: Lucht Tí Íochtarach), or Lower Loughtee, is a barony in County Cavan, Ireland. Baronies were mainly cadastral rather than administrative units. They acquired modest local taxation and spending functions in the 19th century before being superseded by the Local Government (Ireland) Act 1898.

== Etymology ==
Loughtee Lower takes its name from the Irish Loch an Tí (Lake of the House), which was named after Lough Tee lake in Drumlane parish. Early Modern Irish lucht tighe Még Mathghamhna (Annals of the Four Masters), "people of the household of Mac Mahon"; presumably the land was allocated to the vassals of the McMahon tribe.

== Geography ==
Loughtee Lower is located in the north of County Cavan, on the River Erne and south of the Woodford River.

== History ==
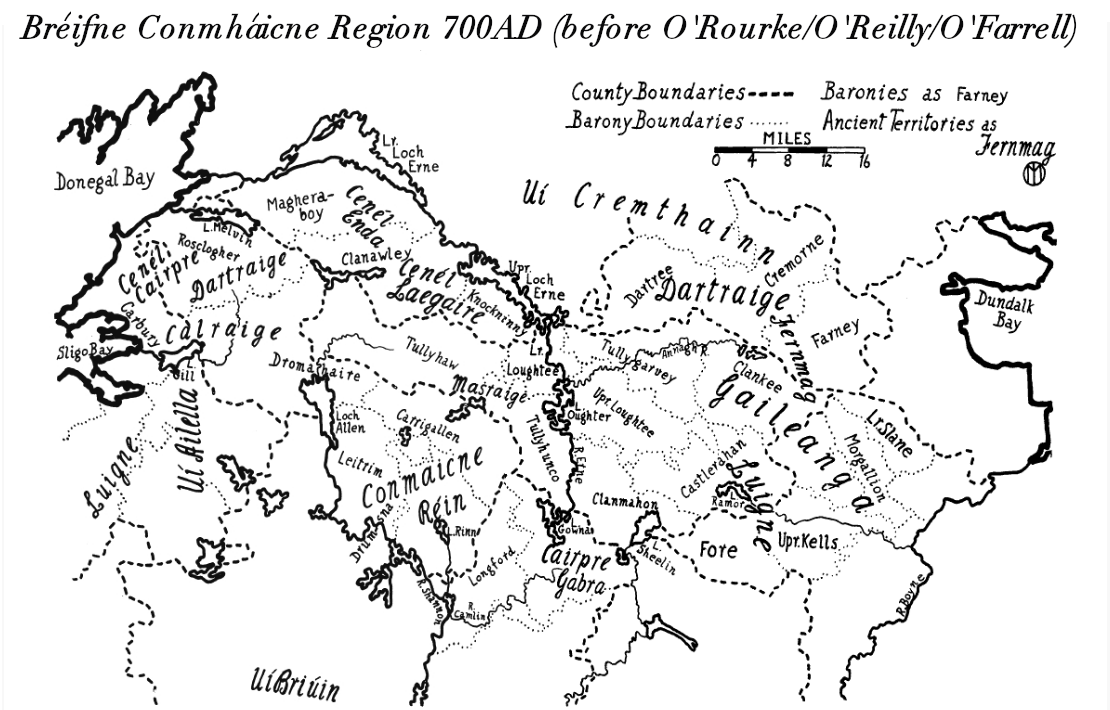
Map of Breifne in AD 700; Lr. Loughtee Lower is seen near to the Masraige territory.

The Ó Faircheallaigh (Farrelly) and MacGaghrans (Magaherans) were ruling Gaelic Irish tribes in the area; they were hereditary coarbs and erenachs of Drumlane Abbey, located near here.

The barony of Loughtee was created by 1609 in the Plantation of Ulster, and was archaically spelled Loughty. Its alluvial soil was recognised as the best in Cavan, and it was originally allocated to the Crown, then later to undertakers.

It was split into Lower and Upper parts in 1821.

== List of settlements ==
Below is a list of settlements in Loughtee Lower:

- Belturbet
- Milltown
