= Liam Inglis =

Irish poet and priest (1709–1778)

Liam Inglis (1709–1778) was a Gaelic-Irish poet and Augustinian priest in Cork city, Ireland.

== Overview ==
Inglis began writing poetry at the age of 24; he later joined a Dominican house in Cork, but transferred to an Augustinian monastery in Rome, where he was ordained as a priest in 1749.

Ó Ciardha describes "Priest-poets such as Liam Inglis, Seán Ó Briain, Conchubhar Ó Briain, Domhnall Ó Colmáin and Uilliam mac Néill Bhacaigh Ó hIarlaithe" as "the heirs of Seathrún Céitinn and Pádraigín Haicéad who had emerged as major political voices in the seventeenth century. The promoted the Stuart cause, which was an intrinsic feature of Irish Catholic nationalist identity until at least 1760." (p. 50, 2001)

In Atá an fhoireann so, Inglis expressed the hope that, with the Stuarts in power, he and the other poets would not need to fear to speck their treason. Composed in 1742, his M'atuirse traochta na fearchoin aostap. 40, spoke of the hope that the banishment of tyrants would free Irish towns from high rent and put an end to the nicknames used for Prince Charles. His empowerment would return all the churches, reverse the decline of the Irish language, and let the poets speck without fear of punishment from the authorities.

He was acquainted with the poets and fellow Jacobite, Éadbhard de Nógla and Tadhg Gaelach Ó Súilleabháin.

Much of his surviving work, such as Ar maidin ag caoidh dham, Póiní an leasa An tAodhaire Óg, can be found in Ó Foghludha. Others such as An sean-duine Seóirse can be found in O'Brien.

== See also ==
- Proinsias Ó Doibhlin
- Richard Tipper
- Tadhg Ó Neachtain
