= Liber Flavus Fergusiorum =

15th-century Irish manuscript

- Royal Irish Academy
- Date: 1437–40
- Place of origin: Ireland
- Language: Middle Irish
- Scribe(s): Aedh, Seaán Ó Conchubair, Uidhisdín Mag Raighin
- Author: Ó Fearghuis
- Material: Vellum

The Liber Flavus Fergusiorum ("Yellow Book of the Ó Fearghuis"; RIA MS 23 O 48 a-b) is a medieval text (dated to c. 1437-40) authored by the Ó Fearghuis, an Irish medical family of Connacht.

== Ó Fearghuis ==
The Ó Fearghuis name was conceived in the 7th century, when Saint Máedóc of Ferns baptised and renamed the sons of Ailill, who was a 7th-great-grandson of Niall, High King of Ireland, as per his genealogy recorded in the Lives of Irish Saints, which reads: "Ailill, son of Rechtaide, son of Eitin, son of Felim, son of Caol, son of Áed, son of Ailill, son of Erc, son of Eógan, son of Niall of the Nine Hostages." The sons of Ailill were Fearghus, who is the progenitor of the Ó Fearghuis, and Faircheallaigh, and they were made Saint Máedóc's heirs to Rossinver Abbey and Drumlane Abbey, respectively.

The Ó Fearghuis were later based at Roscam in Clann Fhergail, and in the 13th century, they moved to what became County Mayo. In the 14th century, members of the family created the manuscript which came to be known as the Liber Flavus Fergusiorum.

== Authorship ==
The Liber Flavus Fergusiorum was composed at various times by several different scribes of the Ó Fearghuis, one of whom identifies himself as Aedh. Two translators, Seaán Ó Conchubair and Uidhisdín Mag Raighin, are named in colophons. Ó Conchubair translated a work on the Office of the Dead into Irish, while Mag Raighin translated the Life of John the Evangelist. The book derives its name from the Ó Fearghuis family, whose descendant Dr. John Fergus brought the manuscript from County Mayo to Dublin in the 18th century. Upon his death in 1761, it was held by his daughter, Frances Arabella Kennedy, whose grandson deposited it in the Royal Irish Academy in 1875.

== See also ==
- Irish medical families

== Sources ==
- Catalogue of Irish manuscripts in the Royal Irish Academy (Dublin, 1933), Fasc. 10: 1254-73.
- E.J. Gwynn, "The Manuscript Known as the Liber Flavus Fergusiorum", Proceedings of the RIA 26 C 2, 15-40.
- Máire Herbert, "Medieval Collections of Ecclesiastical and Devotional Materials: Leabhar Breac, Liber Flavus Fergusiorum and The Book of Fenagh" in Bernadette Cunningham and Siobhán Fitzpatrick, Treasures of the Royal Irish Academy Library (Dublin, 2009), 33-43.
- Diarmuid Ó Laoghaire, "Beatha Eustasius agus Beatha Mhuire Éigipti", Celtica 21 (1990), 489-511.
- Diarmuid Ó Laoghaire, "Mary of Egypt in Irish: A Survey of the Sources", in Poppe and Ross, The Legend of Mary of Egypt in Medieval Insular Hagiography (Dublin, 1996), 255-7.
