= Máedóc of Ferns =

Irish bishop and saint

Saint Máedóc of Ferns
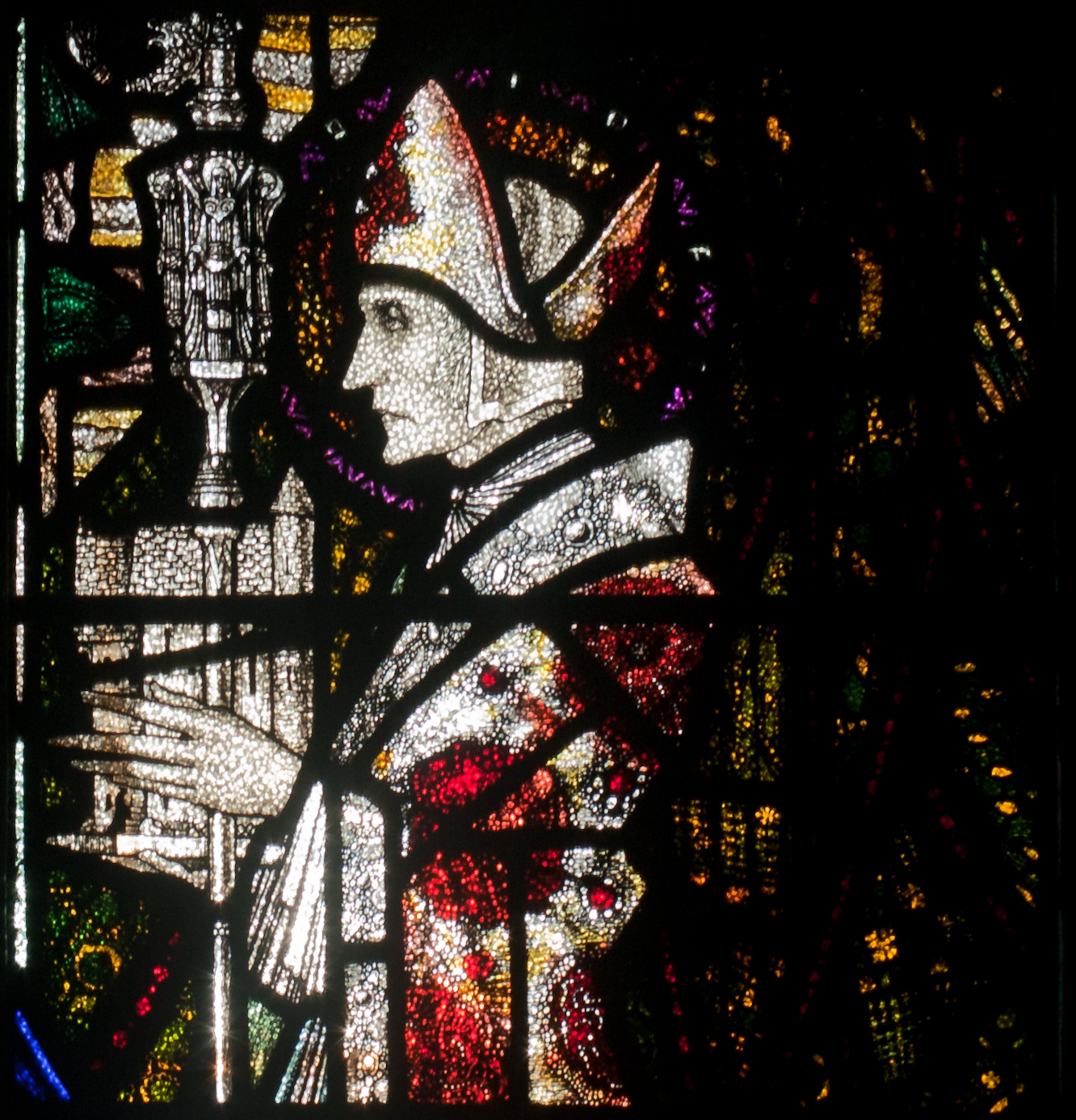
- Stained glass window of elderly Saint Áedan in profile at the Church of the Assumption, Wexford

Bishop of Ferns
- Born: c. 558; Magh Slécht, County Cavan
- Died: 31 January 632; Ferns, County Wexford
- Venerated in: Roman Catholic Church; Anglican Communion; Eastern Orthodox Church
- Canonized: Pre-Congregation
- Major shrine: Enniscorthy
- Feast: 31 January
- Attributes: Honey bees
- Patronage: Ferns Abbey, Templeport Abbey, Drumlane Abbey, Rosinver Abbey, Disert Nairbre Abbey, Llawhaden Abbey

Saint Máedóc of Ferns (Old Irish: [ˈmaːi̯ðoːɡ]; c. 558 – 632), also known as Saint Aidan (Irish: Áedan; Welsh: Aeddan; Latin: Aidanus), Saint Madoc or Saint Mogue (Irish: Mo Aodh Óg), was an Irish saint. He was the first Bishop of Ferns in County Wexford, and the founder of thirty churches.

== Biography ==
Áed was born c. 558 at Inisbrefny (an island in Templeport Lake), in the area then known as Magh Slécht, now the parish of Templeport, County Cavan. In the Welsh genealogies of the saints, Aeddan is called the son of Gildas or Aneurin, sons of Caw, king of Strathclyde; Irish sources make him a son of Sedna, a chieftain of Connaught and his wife Eithne and a first cousin of St. Dallán Forgaill. These separate origins, his work in Wales, the extraordinary span of Aidan's activity, and the appearance of two dates of death has led some scholars—such as Sabine Baring-Gould—to propose that the existing stories of Maedoc are a conflation of two separate Aeds, one Welsh and one Irish, who served as Bishop of Ferns a generation apart. (Note: Baring-Gould notes some difficulties in the chronology, however, and proposes Aeddan might have been a grandson rather than son of Gildas.) (Note: Leslie Toke, writing for the Catholic Encyclopedia, distinguishes this Aed from the son of Gildas.) There is also confusion of these Aeds with Aed mac Bricc, who preceded them and possibly participated in the cursing of Tara with Saint Ruadhán.

Irish legend says that the "Bell of St. Mogue" was given to the infant on his birth by Saint Caillín. When a boat could not be found to take the infant Aedan across the lake to where Caillín waited to baptize him, Aedan was floated to shore on a slab of stone. The font at St Mogue's in Bawnboy is said to be made from part of the stone. As a youth, Aedan was a hostage of Ainmuire mac Sétnai of the Cenél Conaill, High King of Ireland. Ainmire was so impressed with Aedan that he told him he could stay or go. Aedan said he would go, but only if the other hostages were also released, whereupon Ainmire let them all return home. He studied at the great school of Saint Finnian at Clonard Abbey. While at Clonard, Aedan made friends with Molaise, who would later found the monastery of Devenish Island on the River Erne.

By this point, many began to come to the young man desiring to become his disciples. Instead of indulging them, he fled from Ireland to Wales to study under St. David. Welsh legends place his upbringing with David and go into detail concerning attempts on his life by David's steward. Along with Saint Cadoc, he was said to have exterminated an army of Saxons or Irishmen by rolling stones upon their camp in a narrow valley. He was listed in the Welsh triads as one of David's three most faithful disciples. He returned to Ireland in 570, landing on the coast of Wexford with hives of honey bees, which he had been told were scarce on the island. He landed as some locals were plundering another group of strangers and his quick response impressed the local chieftain, who granted him lands for religious communities. He then settled at Brentrocht in Leinster. Aidan is said to have fasted for seven years, during this period he ate only barley bread with water.

Aidan seems to have played a role in the king of Leinster's defeat over the Uí Néill High King Áed mac Ainmuirech of the Cenél Conaill at the Battle of Dún Bolg in 598, either (according to the hagiographers) through the intercession of his prayers or (according to the poets of the Bóroma Laigen) through a failed peace embassy followed by the successful idea to sneak Leinster's soldiers into the enemy camp inside food baskets. However the Aidan, Bishop of Glendalough, referred to in the tale is unlikely to have been St. Máedóc as they had different mothers. Maedóc's mother was Eithne while Aidan's mother was Bríg, daughter of Chobtaig m. Crimthann mac Énnai m. Énnae Cennsalach of the Uí Ceinnselaig dynasty from Leinster.

The grateful King Brandubh then granted him Ferns in County Wexford, where he established a monastery. The influence of Brandubh also convened a synod whereat Ferns was not merely constituted a see but its bishop Aedan was also given nominal supremacy over the other Leinster bishops as their Chief Bishop (Irish: Ard-Escop). He was noted for his benevolence and hospitality: on one occasion, seeing them exhausted by their journey, he permitted beef to be given to a visiting delegation of British bishops during Lent and permitted them to excuse themselves with the claim that the slaughtered cow was merely "milk and vegetables in condensed form" whereas the whey and biscuits the other monks consumed had so many weevils as to occasion "conscientious scruples". On another, he was pushed into a lake to see whether he would lose his temper; upon his meekly restoring himself, his tormenter confessed himself and apologized.

Aeddan himself died on 31 January 632 on Lough Melvin's shore in County Leitrim. His relics are claimed by St. Edan's in Ferns. His stone tomb is inside the cathedral, although his remains are in the original cathedral crypt below. The Breac Maodhóg (his shrine) dates from the 9th century and is an example of an early medieval reliquary. It was often used as a sacred object upon which to swear binding oaths. It was acquired by the National Museum of Ireland in the 1890s.

== Miracles ==
Many miracles are recorded of St. Maedoc during his sojourn in Wales. He was said to have broken a jug while fetching ale for his fellow monks; making the sign of the cross over the shards, however, it was repaired and he continued on his errand. A yoke given to him by David's steward purposefully too small to fit the necks of his oxen miraculously accommodated them and permitted him to bring the necessary materials for Llanddewi Velfrey. Following his return to Ireland, a local begged him for some meal as he was grinding flour and, after receiving some, disguised himself as a blind man to come back and beg for more. Annoyed, the saint cursed him that the generations of his descendants would never lack a blind member. Another time, wolves devoured a calf at one of his monasteries; its mother being inconsolable, Aedan blessed the head of his cook and told him to offer it to the heifer, which licked him and thenceforth "loved him like a calf". When asked by Saint Fintan Munnu to heal monks suffering under an epidemic, Aedan was said to have indulged him: first by curing the monks and then by permitting the sickness to resume when Saint Fintan changed his mind, considering the sickness to be good for their souls. His hagiographers credited Aidan's curses with Brandubh's defeat of the Uí Néill; they further state that, when Sarán slew his father-in-law, he attempted to accommodate the saint only for Aidan to curse him that his right hand would wither to the stump. When Sarán begged for a penance, Aidan directed him to pray for forgiveness at Brandubh's tomb in Ferns; when Sarán did so, a voice from the crypt forgave him. He lost his hand regardless. Miraculous blessings from Aidan were credited with King Brandubh's victory at Dún Bolg in 598; with the selection of his successor Dachua (Mochua Luachra); and with the success of the Irish architect Gobán Saor.

== Legacy ==
He is the patron saint of Hy Kinsellagh or Wexford; Ferns; and Templeport in County Cavan. His feast is commemorated in Bawnboy with prayerful visits to his church and to the island where he was born. The names Mogue and Aidan are popular for people in the West Cavan area. His heirs to Rosinver Abbey in County Leitrim and Drumlane Abbey in County Cavan were Fearghus mac Ailill and Faircheallaigh mac Ailill.

The Catholic episcopal seat formerly located at Ferns (prior to its destruction) is now at St. Aidan's Cathedral in Enniscorthy, although the bishop resides at Wexford. The Anglican diocese is administered from Kilkenny, although St. Edan's Cathedral in Ferns remains the seat of Church of Ireland diocese (itself part of the United Dioceses of Cashel and Ossory). Saint Áedan's is located on the site (and partially includes the ruins) of the earlier Catholic cathedral, which was burnt down in 1575 by the O'Byrnes of Wicklow. It was ordered to be rebuilt by Queen Elizabeth I during her reign, but was only half rebuilt. z

Aedan is credited as the founder of thirty churches and a number of monasteries. The first of these monasteries was on the island of his birth, now the site of 18th-century ruins and burial ground. The clay or mortar from the ruins of the church is said to provide protection against fire or drowning and is kept by many local people in their homes. Other monasteries include Drumlane (near Milltown in County Cavan); at Ferns in County Wexford; at Dissert-Nairbre in County Waterford; and at Rosinver near the site of his death. In Wales he founded Saint Madoc of Ferns church in Haroldston West, Pembrokeshire. The church of Llawhaden, also in Pembrokeshire, Wales, commemorates him near the site of a ford he supposedly discovered while leading his oxen.

== See also ==
- Marmaduke (given name)

== Bibliography ==
- Donald Attwater & Catherine Rachel John: The Penguin Dictionary of Saints, third edition (New York: Penguin Books, 1993), ISBN 0-14-051312-4.
- Charles Doherty: "The Transmission of the Cult of St Máedhog", in P. Ní Chatháin and M. Richter (ed.), Ireland and Europe in the Early Middle Ages: Texts and Transmission (Dublin: Four Courts Press, 2002).
- Charles Doherty: "Leinster, saints of (act. c.550–c.800)", in Oxford Dictionary of National Biography (Oxford: Oxford University Press, 2004), accessed 9 February 2009.
- Daniel Gallogly: Templeport. Souvenir of the Solemn Dedication of St. Mogue's Church (Templeport, County Cavan: James McCabe, 1979).
- Raymond Gillespie: "A Sixteenth-Century Saint's Life. The Second Life of St Maedoc", in Breifne Journal, vol. X, no. 40 (2004), pp. 147–155.
- Raymond Gillespie: "Saints and Manuscripts in Sixteenth-Century Breifne'", in Breifne Journal, vol. XI, no. 44 (2008), pp. 533–557.
- Chris Maguire: Bawnboy and Templeport (Bawnboy, County Cavan: the author, 1999).
- T. H. C. McFall: "An Account of the History of Ferns Cathedral Church" (Dublin: APCK, 1954; reprinted 1999, 2000).
