= Proinsias Ó Doibhlin =

Irish Franciscan Friar Minor and scholar

Proinsias Ó Doibhlin, O.F.M. (1660–1724) was an Irish Franciscan friar, poet and scribe, who died c. 1724.

== Biography ==
Possibly from Muinterevlin (now Ardboe), Ó Doibhlin was a prominent member of the Franciscan community at the Irish College(College of the Immaculate Conception) in Prague where he lectured in philosophy in 1697, where he remained as late as 1712. By 1714 he had returned to Ireland where he had become the Guardian of the Dungannon/Donaghmore Franciscan house; in 1717 he was transferred to Drogheda but was back as Guardian at Dungannon in 1720.

In 1724 he was appointed by the Franciscans as confessor to the Poor Clares in Dublin and seems to have died shortly afterward.

He is the author of a poem, Gach croiceann libh dar feannadh (Every skin you have fleeced), criticising Gearóid Mac Con Míde for the latter's apparent slurs on the O'Neills of Tyrone. Composed sometime between 1716 and 1718, it was known among members of Tadhg Ó Neachtain's literary circle, as a letter survives from Seon Mac Solaidh to Richard Tipper where Mac Solaidh asks for a copy of the poem.

Gach croiceann libh dar feannadh remains the only piece in Irish which can be ascribed to Ó Doibhlin.

== See also ==
- Liam Inglis
- Tadhg Ó Neachtain
