= Úna Ní Bhroin =

Irish poet

- Born: Úna Ní Bhroin
- Died: 5 February 1706/7

Úna Ní Bhroin (died 5 February 1706/7), was a Gaelic poet.

== Biography ==
Úna Ní Bhroin was a Gaelic poet. She married Seán Ó Neachtain, poet and scholar. They had three children, Tadhg, Lúcás, and Anna, and lived in the Liberties near Thomas Street in Dublin. She wrote about 1670 and died on February 5 in either 1706 or 1707. She was believed to be a friend of Máire Ní Reachtagáin and a relation of Edmund Byrne, archbishop of Dublin 1707–24.
