= Aghaderrard Court Tomb =

Court cairn in County Leitrim, Ireland

- Tuama Cúirte Achadh an Doire Aird (Irish)
- The Druid's Altar
- Location within Ireland
- 54.434887°N 8.238940°W
- Type: court cairn
- Location: Aghaderrard West, Buckode, County Leitrim, Ireland

History
- Built: c. 4000–2500 BC

Site notes
- Elevation: 56 m (184 ft)

National monument of Ireland
- Official name: Aghaderrard West
- Reference no.: 477

Aghaderrard Court Tomb is a court cairn and national monument located in County Leitrim, Ireland.

== Location ==
Aghaderrard Court Tomb is located south of Lough Melvin, halfway between Buckode and Kinlough.

== History ==
Aghaderrard Court Tomb was built c. 4000–2500 BC, in the Neolithic.

== Description ==
One longitudinal half of the court cairn survives, with roofstones tipped over the side stones. Behind this is an altar-like stone with six large cup marks. This was formerly known as "The Druid's Altar."
