= Ailill =

Ailill (Ailell, Oilioll) is a male name in Old Irish. It is a prominent name in Irish mythology, as for Ailill mac Máta, King of Connacht and husband of Queen Medb, on whom Shakespeare based the Fairy Queen Mab. Ailill was a popular given name in medieval Ireland, meaning something like "beauty".

== Notables named Ailill ==
- Ailill Aulom, early 1st millennium druid and King of Munster
- Ailill mac Máta, legendary King of Connacht and husband of Queen Medb
- Ailill mac Slanuill, legendary High King of Ireland of the 12th century BC
- Ailill Finn, legendary High King of the 8th century BC
- Ailill Caisfhiaclach, legendary High King of the 5th century BC
- Ailill mac Echach Mugmedóin, half-brother of Niall of the Nine Hostages (5th century AD)
- Ailill Molt, High King of the 5th century AD
- Ailill Inbanda (died c. 549), King of Connacht
- Saint Ailill the First, 6th century Bishop of Armagh
- Ailill the Second, 6th century Bishop of Armagh
- Ailill mac Rechtaide, 6th century patriarch of the Ó Faircheallaigh and the Ó Fearghuis
- Ailill Cruitire, 7th century King of Brega
- Ailill Medraige mac Indrechtaig (died 764), King of Connacht
- Ailill, 9th century Bishop of Clogher
