= John Fergus =

John Fergus may refer to:

- John Fergus (scholar) (c. 1700–c. 1761), Irish physician and man of letters
- John Fergus (politician) (died 1865), British politician
