= Roogagh River =

River in Northern Ireland

Coordinates: 54°24′N 8°05′W

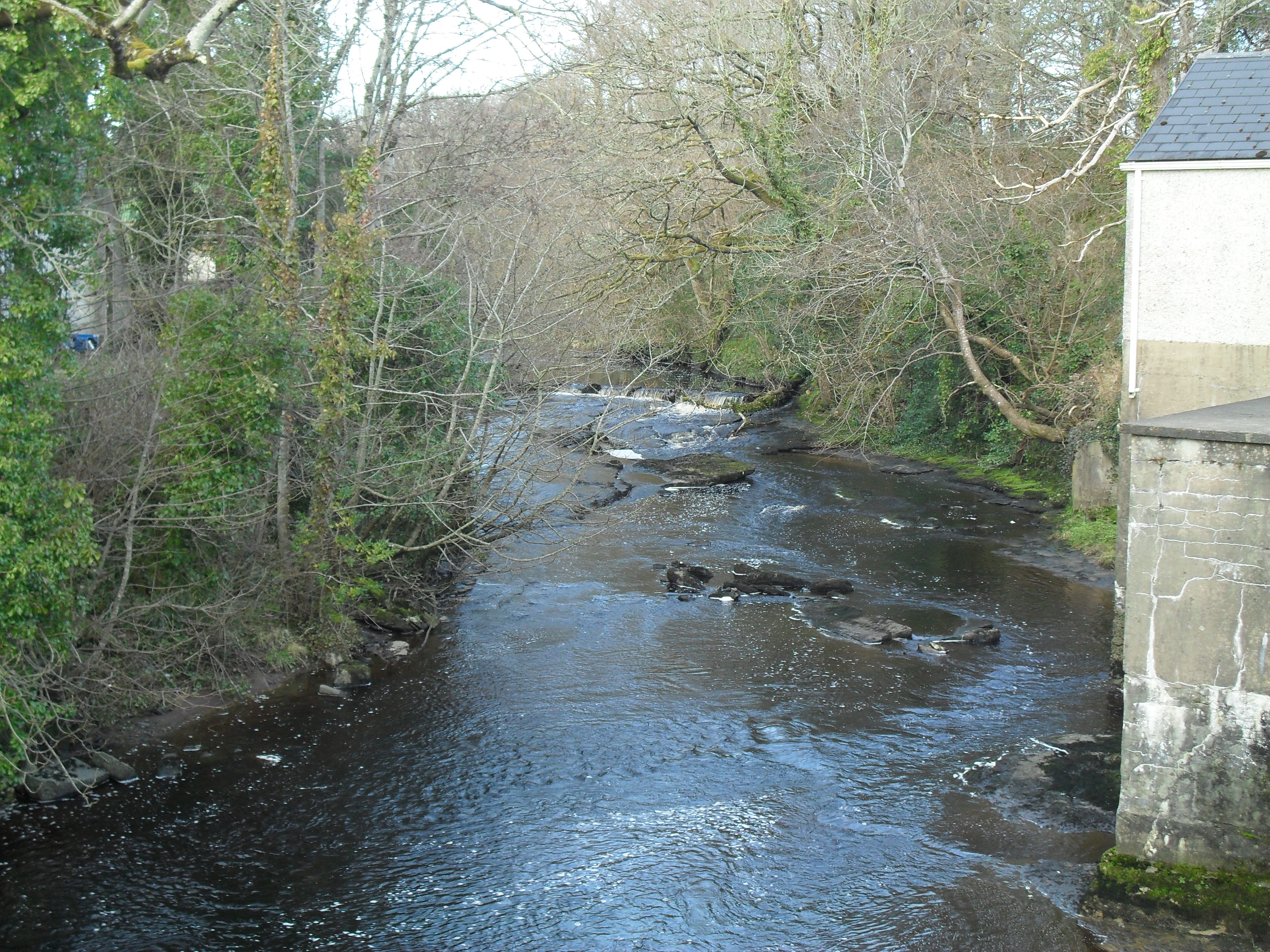
Roogagh River, Garrison

The Roogagh River is one of the main tributaries for Lough Melvin. It flows through Garrison, a small village in County Fermanagh, Northern Ireland, 5 miles south of Belleek, at the eastern end of Lough Melvin.

The "Ground Bridge" on the Roogagh River at Tullybelcoo is a short active river cave. The passage is approximately 45m long and the Roogagh River flows through an outcrop of the Carboniferous Dartry Limestone. This is a unique karstic feature in Northern Ireland.
