= John Fergus (scholar) =

Irish physician and writer (c. 1700–c. 1761)

John Fergus was an Irish physician and man of letters, c.1700 – c.1761.

== Biography ==
A descendant of the Ó Fearghuis medical family of Connacht, Doctor Fergus a native of County Mayo but moved to Dublin city early in his adult life.

He was a scribe, and book collector, as well as a member of the Ó Neachtáin literary circle in early 18th century Dublin. He amassed a huge library of Irish manuscripts, which included the Liber Flavus Fergusiorum, a medical text created by his ancestors in the 14th century.

== Sources ==
- John Fergus MD: Eighteenth-century Doctor, Book Collector and Irish Scholar, by Diarmaid O Cathain, in Journal of the Royal Society of Antiquaries of Ireland, pp. 139–163, volume 118, 1988.

== See also ==
- Seon Mac Solaidh
- Tadhg Ó Neachtain
- Richard Tipper
- Charles O'Conor (historian)
