= Seán Ó Neachtain =

Seán Ó Neachtain may refer to:

- Seán Ó Neachtain (politician) (born 1947), Irish politician
- Seán Ó Neachtain (poet) (c. 1650–1729), Irish writer and poet
