= Seon Mac Solaidh =

Irish scribe

Seon Mac Solaidh, a.k.a. Sean or John Mac Solly, Irish poet and scribe, fl. 1720s.

== Biography ==
A native of Harmanstown, parish of Stackallen, County Meath, Paul Walsh described him as follows: "He cultivated Irish literature, not, however, as an original author. He is known as a diligent copier of MSS., and as a friend of Tadhg O Neachtain, the lexico-grapher ... The two men were joint scribes of a MS. which Edward O Reilly was in possession of in 1830." In a poem of c. 1726, Ó Neachtain refers to Mac Solaidh as follows:

An Solamh sochma Seaán na searc
a Thoigh Calláin taoibhe Teamhrach
cuim is sciath is tearmon dil
fhritil arsaidh mhacaibh Mileadh

Translation:

Calm Mac Solly, John the beloved,
from Stackallen, in Tara's neighbourhood,
protector and shield and faithful guard
of the ancient speech of the sons of Mil.

Mac Solaidh was the scribe of the first part of Stair Eamonn Ui Clerigh (the story of Eamonn Ó Clerigh), composed by Ó Neachtain. He was the scribe of copies of Geoffrey Keating's Foras Feasa ar Éirinn, the Spiritual Mirror on the Beginning and End of Human Life (compiled by Thomas Mac Gabhrain), "and that his signature is found in the printed copy of Mac Aingil's Mirror of the Sacrament of Penance in the Library of Maynooth ... Though his handwriting is not elegant he copied accurately enough, considering the opportunities he had, and the times in which he lived."

== A letter of 1718 ==
Baile Hardaman, Ian, 28, 171 8.
A CHARAID lONMHUIN,
Atá dúil agam go bfuil tú sásaidh leis an leabhar leighis óir do bhi an t-ógánach a thugdamh é annso dia Domhnaigh agus dfáig sé mo leabhar fein agam agus adeir sé go bfuil dearbh-ráthair dhó ro-thinn agus nach bféachann seal-bhadóir an leabhair sin do go bfuighe sé a leabhar ar ais. Chuir misi leabhar oile chuige dféachain nár shásuigh é go ttiucfaidh an leabhar sin. Guidhim thú fa n-a chur a n-ordadh comh maith agus is feidir leat a modh nach crone-óbhaidh sé é agus cuir anuas é comh doith agus is feidir leat. Na dearmoid Seathrún do chur chugam agus an t-abhrán do sgriobh Proinnsias Doibhlin. Tabhair mo sheirbhis do Ghearóid Mac Conmidhe agus do Shéamus O Fearghail agus innis dóibh gur fada liom go bfaicim gach ar gheall siad dhamh, Chuir me saothar Mheic Cearchair chuca mar aon leis an litir so agus abhrán Bhriste na Bóinne roimhe sin. Ma tá spéis agad ionnta gheabhair ag Gearóid iad. Madh chualaidh tú ní ar bioth fam dhoctur cuir sgéala chugam óir is fada liom go ccluiniom uaidh agus is ro-fhada liom go bfagham do sgéala féin. A ndóigh go bfuil an tsláinte agad fein agus ag do chúram go léir mar atá agam-sa do láthair glóir mhór do Dhia dá cheann gabham mo chead agad. Od charaid bhithdhilis go héug. SEON MAC SOLAIDH. Fiafraigh an bfuair Gearóid an t-abhrán agus muna bfuighe sé é romhad tabhair chuige é.
ffor Mr. Richd. Tupper in Michillstowen near Dublin

Translation:

Harmanstown, Jan. 28, 171 8.
Dear Friend,
I hope you have finished with the Book of Medicine, because the young man who gave it to me was here on Sunday, and left me my own book; and he says that his brother is very ill, and that the owner of the Book of Medicine will not give treatment to him until he gets it back. I sent him another to try instead; but it did not satisfy him in the absence of that book which you have. I beseech you to arrange it in order as well as you can so that he shall not miss it, and send it down as soon as you are able. Do not forget to send me Geoffrey [Keating] and the song which Francis Devlin wrote. Give my service to Garret Macnamee and to James O Farrell, and tell them I am longing to see all they have promised me. I have sent them Mac Carragher's work with this letter, and the Song of the Rout of the Boyne before that. If you have any interest in these you will get them with Garret. If you have heard anything about my Doctor send me news, for I am wishing to hear of him, and I am very desirous to get intelligence of yourself. Hoping yourself and all your family are in good health, as I am at present — great glory to God for it — I take my leave of you. From your friend ever-faithful to death. JOHN MacSOLLY. Ask if Garret got the song, and if he does not get it before you, bring it to him.
For Mr. Richd. Tupper in Mitchelstown, near Dublin

== See also ==
- Richard Tipper
- Seamus Ó Fearghail
- Proinsias Ó Doibhlin
- Gearóid Mac Con Mhíde
