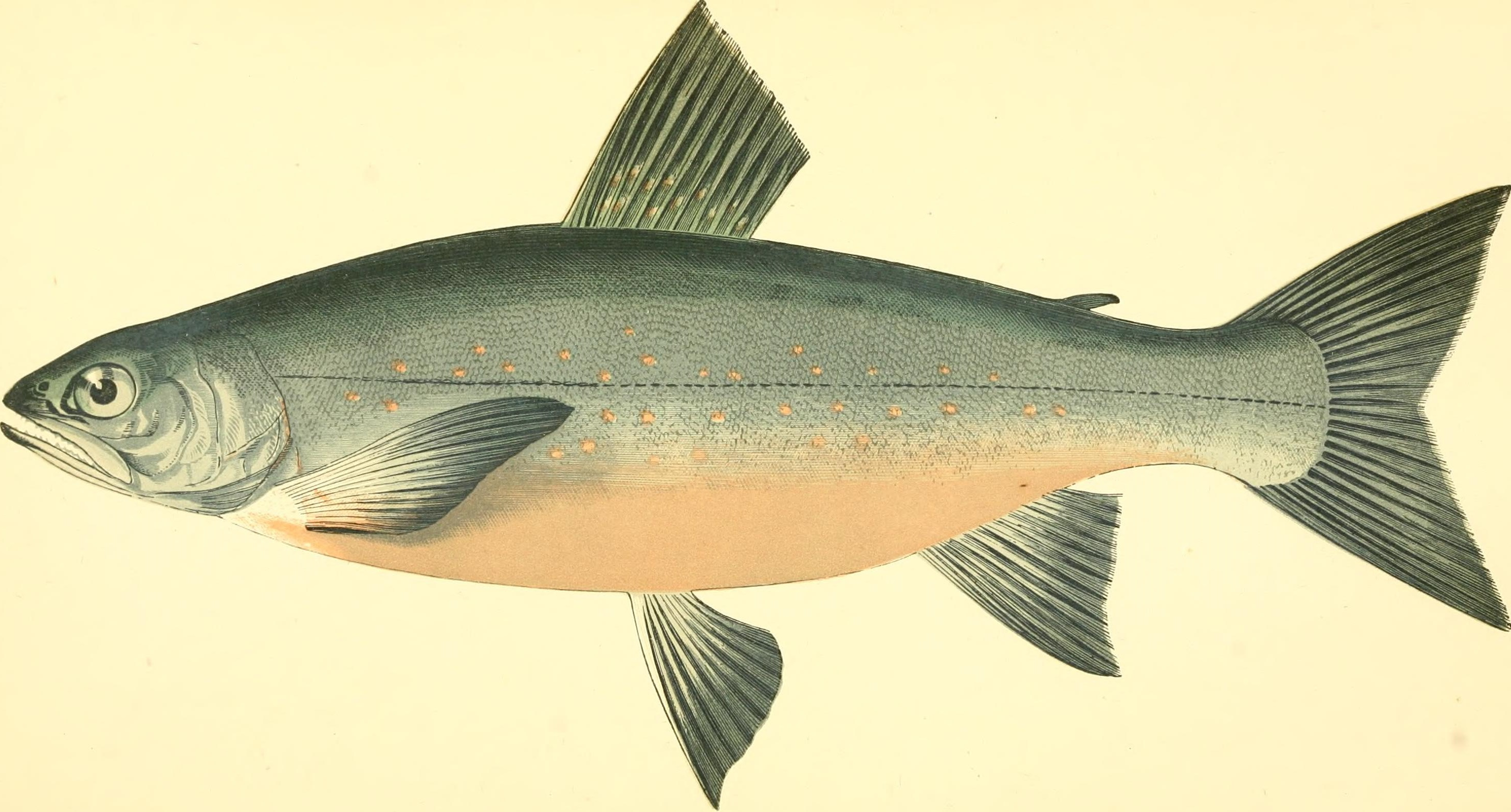

Conservation status
- Critically Endangered (IUCN 3.1)

Scientific classification
- Kingdom: Animalia
- Phylum: Chordata
- Class: Actinopterygii
- Division: Teleostei
- Order: Salmoniformes
- Family: Salmonidae
- Genus: Salvelinus
- Species: S. grayi

Binomial name
- Salvelinus grayi Günther, 1862

Synonyms
- Salmo grayi (Günther, 1862); Salvelinus evasus (Freyhof & Kottelat, 2005)

= Salvelinus grayi =

Species of fish

Salvelinus grayi, also called Gray's char[r], Lough Melvin char[r] or freshwater herring, is a species of lacustrine char in the family Salmonidae.

It is only found in Lough Melvin, Ireland; numbers of fish are declining and the species is considered critically endangered by the International Union for Conservation of Nature.

Location of Lough Melvin

== Taxonomy ==
=== Name ===
The describer, Albert Günther, named the fish after his longtime colleague John Edward Gray. The English word "char[r]" is thought to derive from Old Irish ceara/cera meaning "[blood] red," referring to its pink-red underside. This would also connect with its Welsh name torgoch, "red belly."

== Description ==
This species grows to an average length of 10 to 12 in (25 to 30 cm) and a weight of 8 ounces (230 g). Compared to other members of the Salvelinus genus, it has a deeper body that is more laterally compressed, a shorter caudal peduncle and larger scales. It can be distinguished from other char by the whitish spots on upper flank and caudal and dorsal fins.

== Biology ==
Salvelinus grayi is benthopelagic, living at 10–30 m (30–100 ft), except during the spawning season. It feeds on water fleas (crustaceans of the order Cladocera). It spawns in November, in shallow rocky areas.

== Conservation ==
Recorded numbers in Lough Melvin declined from 33 in 1975 and 42 in 1986, to only 12 in 2001, and the species is considered critically endangered. Common rudd introduction and eutrophication are blamed for the decline. In 2003, a plan to relocate some of the fish to a nearby reservoir failed when no fish could be found despite extensive search. Nor was the fish observed to be spawning in its traditional spawning locations. The lake has experienced increasing levels of phosphorus as a result of agricultural activities in its catchment area, and char are notoriously sensitive to phosphorus. Another factor in the fish's decline may be the introduction into the lake of rudd and roach.
