= R283 road (Ireland) =

Road in Ireland

Coordinates: 54.354294°N 8.038489°W

R283 road
- Bóthar R283
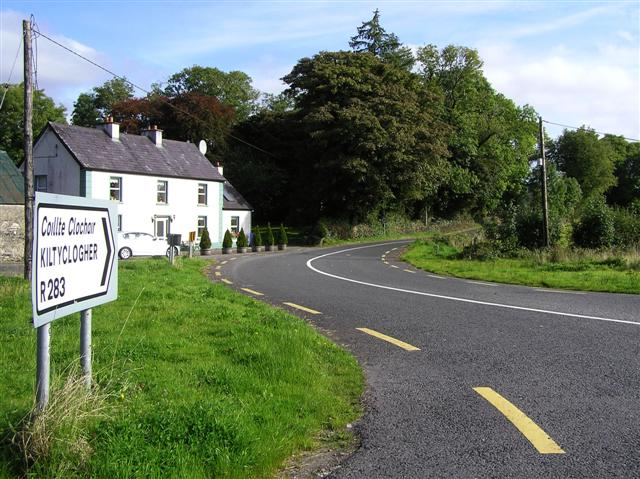
- R283 at Moneenshinnagh

Route information
- Length: 10.7 km (6.6 mi)

Major junctions
- From: N16 Moneenshinnagh (east of Manorhamilton)
- R281 Kiltyclogher
- To: Border with Northern Ireland

Location
- Country: Ireland

Highway system
- Roads in Ireland; Motorways; Primary; Secondary; Regional

The R283 road is a regional road in Ireland, located in County Leitrim.
