= Farrelly =

Irish surname

The Ó Faircheallaigh are an Irish family of County Cavan, whose name is anglicised as Farrelly. The patronym means "descendant of Faircheallach", whose name means "super war". Faircheallach was the son of Ailill, a 7th-great-grandson of Niall, King of Ireland. He was made the heir of Saint Máedóc of Ferns in the 7th century and the Ó Faircheallaigh were the Abbots of Drumlane for 7 centuries, until David Ó Faircheallaigh became Bishop of Kilmore. Major Patrick Farrelly (m. Elizabeth Mead) was the father of David Farrelly, who was an author of the third Pennsylvania Constitution (1836); and General Terrence Farrelly was the first judge of Arkansas County, Speaker of the General Assembly of Arkansas Territory, and an author of the first Arkansas Constitution (1836); his son John Farrelly (m. Martha Clay) was a politician, and his grandson John Patrick Farrelly was Bishop of Cleveland. The name became Farley, and John Farley became Cardinal Archbishop of New York.

== Early history ==
The name was conceived in the 7th century, when Saint Máedóc of Ferns baptised and renamed the sons of Ailill, who was a 7th-great-grandson of Niall, High King of Ireland, as per his descent recorded in the Lives of Irish Saints, which reads: "Ailill, son of Rechtaide, son of Eitin, son of Felim, son of Caol, son of Áed, son of Ailill, son of Erc, son of Eógan, son of Niall of the Nine Hostages." The sons of Ailill were thus named Fearghus and Faircellach and they were made Saint Máedóc's heirs to Rosinver Abbey and Drumlane Abbey respectively. Faircellach became the first Abbot of Drumlane in 624. While the Irish title for a saint's heir can be coarb or erenagh, the Annals of the Kingdom of Ireland provide an authoritative translation in a note for the year 1025: "Dubhinsi Ua Faircheallaigh, herenagh of Druim-leathan [...] died."

The Lives of Irish Saints states: "Once when Máedóc was at Ferns at the end of his time, the angel of the Lord revealed to him that the term of his days and the end of his life was now approaching and drawing nigh, and bade him go to the place of his resurrection, and to the site of his burial, and to leave his churches and noble annoits, and his chosen sanctuaries, to their native gentry and to their proper heirs after him. Máedóc did so. He left Ferns and its lands under the authority of Cele and Aedan, and with their race and descendants, together with the perpetual obligation of levying and collecting the tribute dues of Leinster, and of dividing them impartially among his churches and coarbs, as we said above. He went thence to Drumlane, and did the same in that church. He left the headship and coarbship of that church with Urcain, son of Ailill, who was called Faircellach. Máedóc had baptized this man, Urcain, and given him the name of Faircellach; for these were the two first attendants that Máedóc had, viz. Faircellach and Fergus his brother, two sons of Ailill."

The descendants of Faircheallach were thereafter called the Ó Faircheallaigh, and they were the Abbots of Drumlane Abbey for 7 centuries. According to the Lives of Irish Saints, Faircheallaigh's other brother, Fearghus (otherwise written as Fergus) was made the first Abbot of Rosinver in County Leitrim.

The Lives of Irish Saints then details the succession of the Ó Faircheallaigh up to the time of Fergal ua Ruairc, King of Connacht from 956 to 967: "When fierce Maedoc died, both wall and great garden, the church with its horned cattle, were entrusted by him to Faircheallach. After Faircheallach died, the protection of the church was entrusted to the welcoming countenance which never refused a company, to the noble man, to Maelchiaráin. Cúduilig, short was his activity, after forcible Maelchiaráin; Three years were these two undoubtedly in the coarbship after one another. Maelbrigde of the melodious voice, Concobar was his son; Maelbrigde did not succeed to the fair church, but his son Concobar succeeded."

== Abbots of Drumlane ==
- Maelchiaráin Ó Faircheallaigh, Abbot of Drumlane (?)
- Cúduilig Ó Faircheallaigh, Abbot of Drumlane (?)
- Records lost through 965 (see the burning of Drumlane)
- Conchobhar Ó Faircheallaigh, Abbot of Drumlane (965–)
- Dubhinsi Ó Faircheallaigh, Abbot of Drumlane (–1025)
- Conaig Ó Faircheallaigh, Abbot of Drumlane (–1059)
- Muiredach Ó Faircheallaigh, Abbot of Drumlane (–1257)
- Niall Ó Faircheallaigh, Abbot of Drumlane (–1357)
- William Ó Faircheallaigh, Abbot of Drumlane (–1368)
- Muiredach Ó Faircheallaigh, Abbot of Drumlane (1368–)
- William Ó Faircheallaigh, Abbot of Drumlane (–1400)
- Maurice Ó Faircheallaigh, Abbot of Drumlane (1400–)
- Muiredach Ó Faircheallaigh, Abbot of Drumlane (–1438)
- Nicholas Ó Faircheallaigh, Abbot of Drumlane (1438–)

== Modern era ==
Several Farrellys are mentioned in the Fiants of 19 January 1586, as Queen Elizabeth I of England granted them pardons for fighting against the Queen's forces in an Irish regiment of the Spanish Army in the Eighty Years' War. The 1882 transcription of the Fiants misspells the name, as recorded in Document 4813: "Pardon to Hugh, son of Hugh, son of William Irielli of Droumlain; Patrick son of Hugh, son of William Irielli of same; Moyle-Shaughelen, son of Gillpatrick, son of William Irielli; John, son of Gillpatrick, son of William Irielli; Henry, son of Gillpatrick, son of William Irielli; Donel, son of Gillpatrick, son of Hugh Irielli; Edmond, son of Hugh, son of Hugh Irielli; Gillpatrick, son of Thomas, son of Gillpatrick Irielli; Shane, son of Morrish, son of Mahowne Irielli." In the 1911 Census of Ireland, there were 1,075 Farrellys recorded in County Cavan.

== Notable Farrellys ==
- Alexander Farrelly (1923–2002), American governor
- Bobby Farrelly (born 1958), American filmmaker
- Columb Farrelly (died 2008), Irish composer
- David Farrelly (1807–1890), American politician
- Denis Farrelly (1912–1974), Irish politician
- Dick Farrelly (1916–1990), Irish poet
- Elizabeth Farrelly (born 1957), Australian author
- Farrelly brothers (born 1956/1958), Irish filmmakers
- Francis Farrelly (1895–1965), South African cricketer
- Frank Farrelly (1931–2013), Irish author
- Gareth Farrelly (born 1975), Irish footballer
- Gary Farrelly (born 1983), Irish artist
- Gearoid Farrelly (born 1977), Irish comedian
- John Patrick Farrelly Jr. (1856–1921), American bishop
- John Patrick Farrelly Sr. (born c. 1820), American politician
- John V. Farrelly (born 1954), Irish politician
- John Wilson Farrelly (1809–1860), American politician
- Midget Farrelly (1944–2016), Australian surfer
- Patrick Farrelly (1770–1826), American politician
- Paul Farrelly (born 1962), British politician
- Peter Farrelly (born 1956), American filmmaker
- Sinead Farrelly (born 1989), American-Irish footballer
- Stephen "Sheamus" Farrelly (born 1978), Irish wrestler
- Terrence Farrelly (1795–?), American general

== See also ==
- Farley (disambiguation)
- Drumlane Abbey
