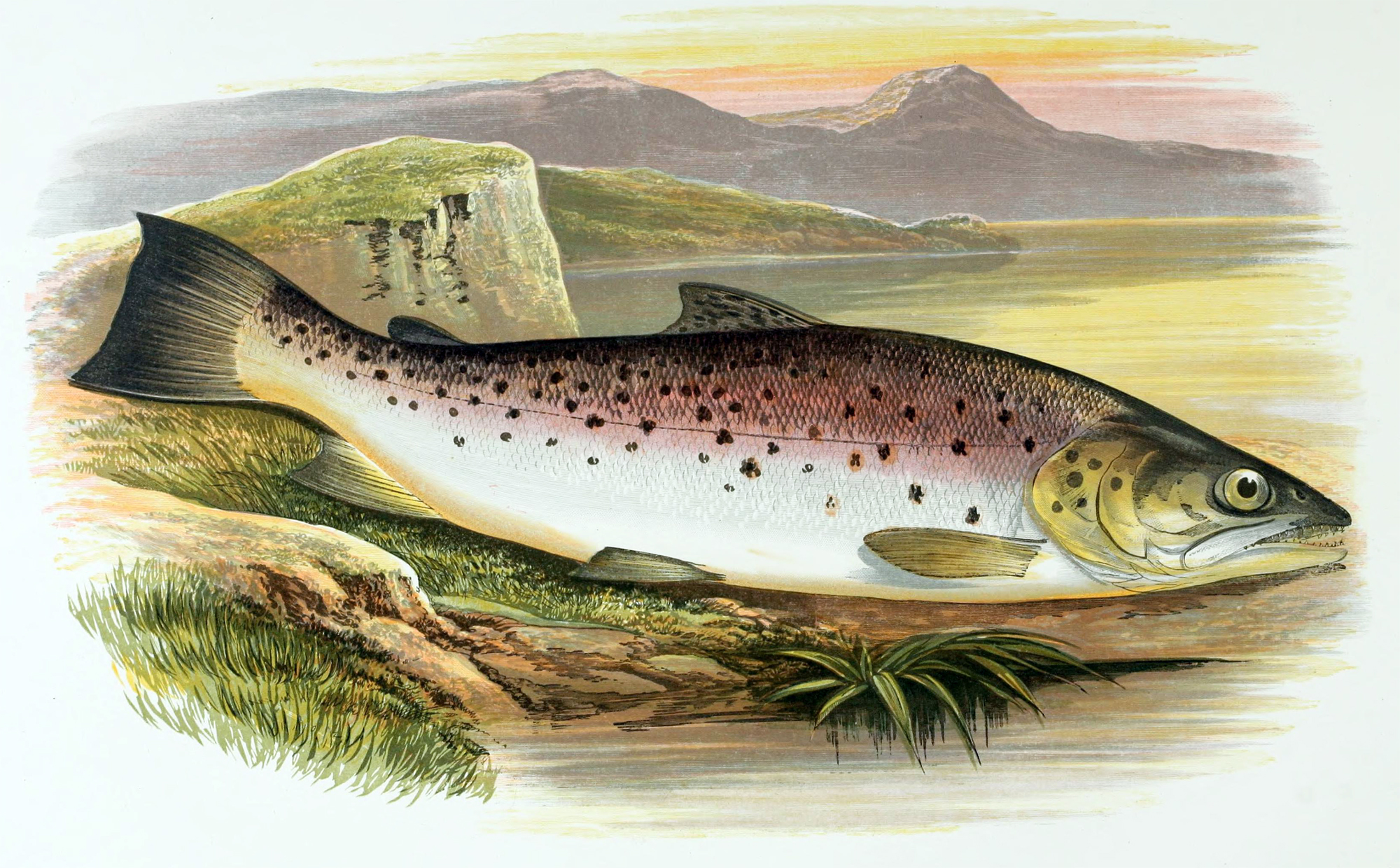

Conservation status
- Data Deficient (IUCN 3.1)

Scientific classification
- Kingdom: Animalia
- Phylum: Chordata
- Class: Actinopterygii
- Order: Salmoniformes
- Family: Salmonidae
- Genus: Salmo
- Species: S. ferox

Binomial name
- Salmo ferox Jardine, 1835

= Ferox trout =

Species of fish

Ferox trout (Salmo ferox) is a species of freshwater ray-finned fish belonging to the family Salmonidae, the chars, trouts, salmons and graylings. This species is found in and endemic to freshwater lakes in Great Britain and Ireland.

== Taxonomy ==
The ferox trout was first formally described in 1835 by the Scottish naturalist Sir William Jardine, 7th Baronet of Applegarth with the type localities given as Loch Awe, Loch Laggan, upper end of Loch Shin, Loch Loyal and Loch Assynt in Scotland. The taxonomic status of this fish is subject to debate with some authorities regarding it as a form of the brown trout while others consider it to be a distinct lineage within the brown trout species complex. In many lochs the ferox trout are not closely related to the brown trout in the same loch and are more closely related to ferox trout in other lochs. For example, the ferox trout in Loch Awe, Argyll and Bute and Loch Laggan, Highland Lough Melvin in Northern Ireland were more closely related to each other than they were to the brown trout in same waters. Eschmeyer's Catalog of Fishes treats the ferox trout as a valid species. The ferox trout is classified in the genus Salmo, the Eurasian trouts and Atlantic salmon, which is classified in the subfamily Salmoninae of the family Salmonidae.

== Etymology ==
The ferox trout is classified in the genus Salmo, the name of this genus being the Latin word for trout or salmon. The specific name, ferox, mean "fierce", an allusion to the "extreme voracity and ferocious habits" of this fish.

== Description ==
Ferox trout has a deeper body than the brown trout it lives alongside. The body is brown to silvery with a few small black spots which are equal to or smaller than the size of the pupil, although these may be absent. They are larger and have a maxilla which extends past the eye. The ferox trout has a maximum standard length of 80 cm (31 in).

== Distribution and habitat ==
Ferox trout are known to occur in glacial lochs and loughs in Ireland and Scotland, while predatory trout populations in the Lake District of England and in Wales have not yet been confirmed to be ferox trout. These fish typically inhabit nutrient poor glacial lochs with a surface area greater than 100 ha (250 acres) where there are populations of char (Salvelinus spp).

== Biology ==
Ferox trout feed on benthic invertebrates until they reach a standard length of 30 cm (12 in) when they become piscivorous and pelagic, with char being the favoured prey in most waters. They spawn in large tributary rivers and streams, their growth is rapid, they commence piscivory earlier and attain sexual maturity later than sympatric brown trout.

== See also ==
- Dollaghan
- Gillaroo
- Sea trout
