= Dollaghan =

Common name for a type of brown trout

Dollaghan are a variety of brown trout (Salmo trutta) native to Lough Neagh, Northern Ireland, and many of its tributaries. They are a potamodromous migratory trout spending much of the year in the lough, returning to the rivers in autumn to spawn. Dollaghan are much sought after by anglers in County Antrim, County Tyrone and County Londonderry due to their greater size in comparison to the non-migratory trout found in streams such as the Ballinderry River, Six Mile Water, Moyola River and River Main. They are often caught in the dark using methods very similar to that of fishing for sea trout, where it is surmised their name comes from an old Irish word for 'ghost'.. Many anglers regard them as an elusive species and call them 'sea trout of Lough Neagh'. Their weight varies greatly - from small fish of around 1/2 lb to large specimens of around 20 lb. There are three other strains of brown trout in Ireland: Gillaroo, Sonaghen and Ferox. The Dollaghan is thought to have evolved from sea trout which were land locked many years ago.
