= Kiltyclogher =

Village in County Leitrim, Ireland

Kiltyclogher Coillte Clochair
- Village
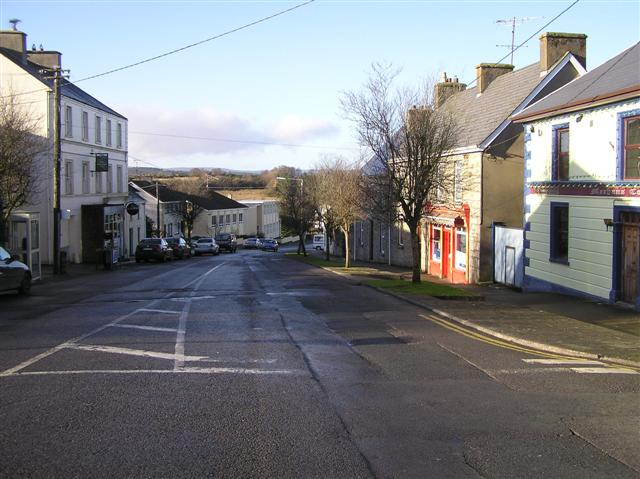
- The R281 passes through Kiltyclogher

- Location in Ireland
- Coordinates: 54°21′23″N 8°02′16″W
- Country: Ireland
- Province: Connacht
- County: County Leitrim
- Elevation: 76 m (249 ft)

Population (2011)
  - Rural: 233
- (Total for electoral division in which the village lies)
- Time zone: UTC+0 (WET)
  - Summer (DST): UTC-1 (IST (WEST))
- Irish Grid Reference: G976455

Kiltyclogher (Irish: Coillte Clochair, meaning 'stony woods') is a small village in County Leitrim, Ireland. It is on the border with County Fermanagh, close to the hamlet of Cashelnadrea. The nearest town is Manorhamilton, 10 km to the south-west (14 km by road).

== Population ==
The population of the electoral division in which Kiltyclogher lies was 233 residents as of the 2011 census, a decline of 21 from the 2006 figure of 254. In 1925, Kiltyclogher village comprised 38 houses, 7 being licensed to sell alcohol.

== Locations of interest ==
=== Prince Connell's Grave ===
Corracloona Court Tomb, also called "Prince Connell's Grave", is located outside Kiltyclogher, on the Glenfarne road. It is a passage grave and dates from the 2nd millennium B.C.

=== Seán Mac Diarmada's house ===
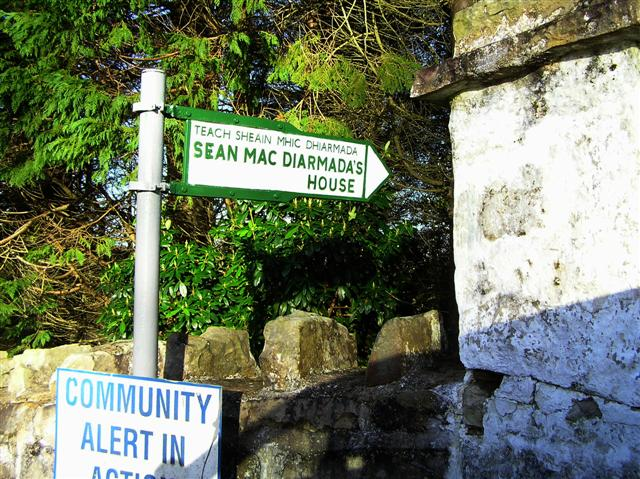
Seán Mac Diarmada's house

The family home of Seán Mac Diarmada, one of the seven signatories of the 1916 Proclamation of Irish independence, who was executed by the British in May 1916, is a three-roomed thatched cottage with some thatched outbuildings, partially surrounded by rhododendrons, and overlooking Upper Lough Macnean.

=== Black Pig's Dyke ===
Remnants of the Black Pig's Dyke (Irish: Gleann na muice duibhe, meaning "glen of the black pig") exist to the west of the village. These prehistoric earthworks, between the old rival Irish provinces of Ulster and Connacht, may have been constructed as defences against invasion and/or cattle-raiding.

== Transport ==
Bus Éireann route 470 serves the village on Fridays and Saturdays providing links to Manorhamilton, Sligo, Rossinver and Glenfarne.
