= Buckode =

Village in County Leitrim, Ireland

Buckode Bocóid
- Village
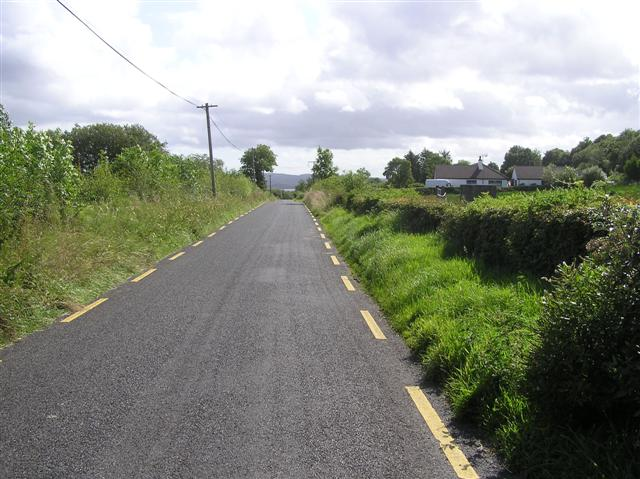
- The R281 at Buckode

- Location in Ireland
- Coordinates: 54°25′43″N 8°12′36″W
- Country: Ireland
- Province: Connacht
- County: County Leitrim
- Elevation: 171 m (561 ft)
- Time zone: UTC+0 (WET)
  - Summer (DST): UTC-1 (IST (WEST))
- Irish Grid Reference: G864533

Buckode (Irish: Bocóid) is a small village and townland in County Leitrim, Ireland. It lies south of Lough Melvin on the R281 regional road.
