= Francis Farrelly =

South African cricketer (1895–1965

Personal information
- Full name: Francis James Farrelly
- Born: 11 December 1895; Kimberley, Cape Colony
- Died: 21 August 1965 (aged 69); Kimberley, Cape Province, South Africa
- Batting: Right-handed
- Bowling: Left-arm

Domestic team information
- Years: Team
- 1921/22–1930/31: Griqualand West

Career statistics
Competition	First-class
Matches	22
Runs scored	1,089
Batting average	27.22
100s/50s	0/7
Top score	94
Balls bowled	1,215
Wickets	25
Bowling average	29.12
5 wickets in innings	0
10 wickets in match	0
Best bowling	4/57
Catches/stumpings	13/–
- Source: Cricinfo, 14 May 2024

Francis James Farrelly (11 December 1895 – 21 August 1965) was a South African cricketer who played first-class cricket for Griqualand West between 1921–22 and 1930–31.

Born in Kimberley, Farrelly was educated in England at Stonyhurst College. Opening the bowling for the school's First XI in 1913, he took 134 wickets at an average of 5.39. It is believed to be the highest number of wickets taken in an English public schools season. In the 2021 edition of Wisden Cricketers' Almanack he was retrospectively named Wisden Schools Cricketer of the Year for 1913.

Farrelly returned to South Africa and played for Griqualand West for nearly ten years as an all-rounder. His highest score was 94 in a Currie Cup match against Western Province in January 1926, when Griqualand West won by six wickets. He had taken his best bowling figures the previous month: 4 for 57 on the losing side against Transvaal.
