= Máire Ní Reachtagáin =

Irish poet

- Born: Máire Ní Reachtagáin
- Died: 11 April 1733
- Spouse: Tadhg Ó Neachtain

Máire Ní Reachtagáin (died 11 April 1733) was a Gaelic poet.

== Biography ==
Máire Ní Reachtagáin was a Gaelic poet. She married Tadhg Ó Neachtain in 1717. Very little is known about her except for notes left by her husband.

She was from Dublin city though the eulogy of her death asks for laments from Meath suggesting she may have been born there. Only a handful of her work remains. In her lament for her brother Seoirse she wrote in the third person and structured it in quatrains. Some of her work was suggested to have been written by her husband though there is no evidence to suggest that was the case.
