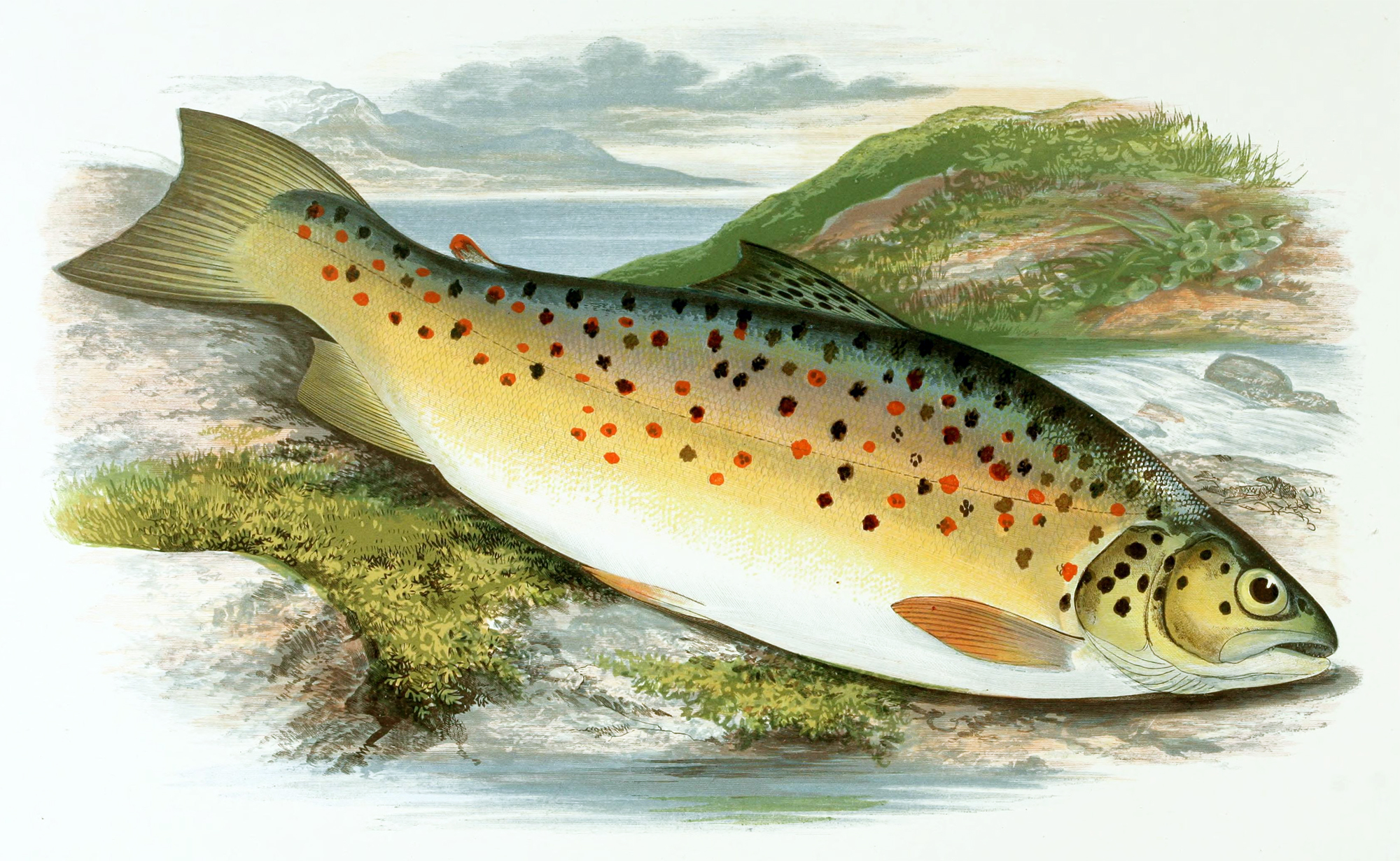

Conservation status
- Vulnerable (IUCN 3.1)

Scientific classification
- Kingdom: Animalia
- Phylum: Chordata
- Class: Actinopterygii
- Division: Teleostei
- Order: Salmoniformes
- Family: Salmonidae
- Genus: Salmo
- Species: S. stomachicus

Binomial name
- Salmo stomachicus Günther, 1866
- Endemic to Lough Melvin

= Gillaroo =

Species of fish

The gillaroo (Salmo stomachicus; historically included in Salmo trutta) is a species of trout which eats primarily snails and is only proven to inhabit Lough Melvin in Ireland.

The name gillaroo is derived from the Irish for "red fellow" (giolla rua); this is due to the fish's distinctive colouring. It has a bright, buttery golden colour in its flanks with bright crimson and vermilion spots. The gillaroo is characterised by these deep red spots and a "gizzard", which is used to aid the digestion of hard food items such as water snails.

Experiments carried out by Queen's University Belfast established that the Lough Melvin fish are different from brown trout found anywhere else in the world. They feed almost exclusively on bottom living animals (snails, sedge fly larva and freshwater prawns) except during late summer. It is at this time that they come to surface to feed and may be caught on the dry fly. Other lakes reputed to contain the gillaroo are Loughs Neagh, Conn, Mask and Corrib. However the unique gene found in the Lough Melvin trout has not been found in some 200 trout populations in Ireland and Britain. It is therefore now recognised using its own original scientific name, rather than continued inclusion in the widespread Salmo trutta, with which it had been synonymised. In addition to the gillaroo, Lough Melvin is thought to harbour another two peculiar species of trout, apart from salmon and an endemic species of char.

However, Irish authorities do not distinguish the gillaroo as a separate species from brown trout.

Legend has it that St. Brigid was offered chicken to eat on a Friday as she walked through Garrison, County Fermanagh. Chicken being forbidden on Fridays for members of the Catholic faith, she was so enraged she threw the entire bird into the river, whereupon it changed into a fish; hence, the "gizzard".

== See also ==
- Ferox trout
- Dollaghan
