= Séamus Ó Fearghail =

Irish poet

Séamus Ó Fearghail, aka James O Farrell, Irish poet and scribe, fl. 1711-1718. Paul Walsh wrote of him in 1918:

"James O Farrell we hear of from Tadhg O Neachtain, already referred to: O Fearghail fa dheóigh Séamus seang/a crich Longphortach aird Eireann/James O Farrell the graceful/from the high land of Longford in Erin. He wrote some folios, now in the British Museum, in 1711. There were other scribes later named O Farrell."
