= Corracloona Court Tomb =

Chamber tomb in County Leitrim, Ireland

- Tuama Cúirte Currach Chluana (Irish)
- Prince Connell's Grave
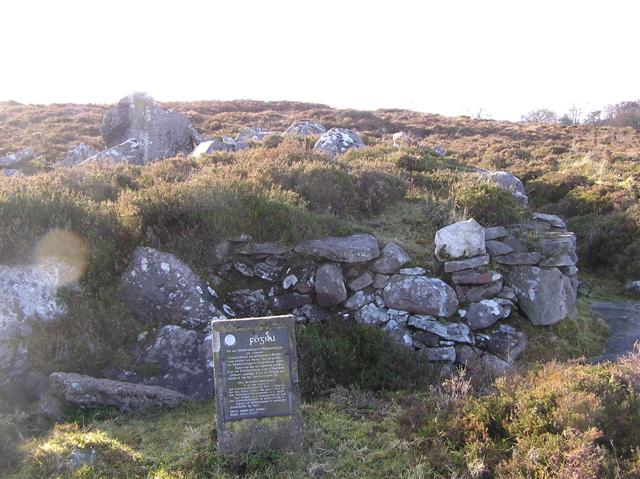

- Location within Ireland
- 54.334821°N 8.004539°W
- Type: court cairn?
- Location: Corracloona, Kiltyclogher, County Leitrim, Ireland

History
- Built: c. 2000–1500 BC

Site notes
- Elevation: 112 m (367 ft)
- Height: 1.2 m (3 ft 11 in)

National monument of Ireland
- Official name: Corracloona
- Reference no.: 405

Corracloona Court Tomb, commonly called Prince Connell's Grave, is a chamber tomb and National Monument located in the north of County Leitrim in the West of Ireland.

== Location ==
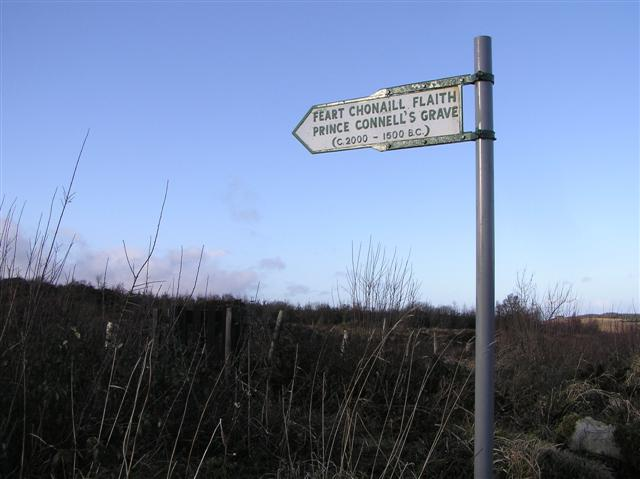
Directional sign

Corracloona Court Tomb is located on a slope overlooking the northern tip of Lough MacNean, 3.3 km (2 miles) southeast of Kiltyclogher.

== History ==
Corracloona Court Tomb was built c. 2000–1500 BC, in the early Bronze Age.

It is locally known as Prince Connell's Grave (Irish: Feart Chonaill Flaith). There are several nobles of this name in Irish legend; the most likely candidate is Conall Gulban, 5th-century founder of the Cenél Conaill. However, another legend places Conall Gulban's grave at the dolmen at Fenagh. In any case, both Corracloona and Fenagh monuments are thousands of years older than Conall Gulban.

It was first excavated in 1953.

== Description ==
Prince Connell's Grave is usually described as a court tomb (court cairn), although some see it as a dolmen (portal tomb) or Wedge-shaped gallery grave (wedge tomb). It has a small forecourt (1.5 m wide) and only one burial chamber (2 × 3.5 m), with a large slab separating the two. This slab has a large hole in the bottom, called a "kennel-hole"; this is similar to some tombs in southern France, and may have been used to add additional burials, speak to the dead or leave offerings. However, the hole could be an accidental break.
