= Milltown, County Cavan =

Village in County Cavan, Ireland

Milltown Baile an Mhuilinn
- Village
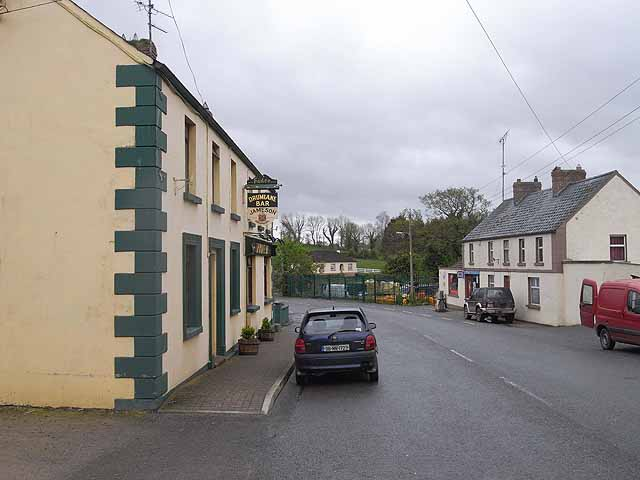
- Milltown lies on the R201 road

- Location in Ireland
- Coordinates: 54°04′00″N 7°28′40″W
- Country: Ireland
- Province: Ulster
- County: Cavan
- Elevation: 51 m (167 ft)
- Time zone: UTC+0 (WET)
  - Summer (DST): UTC-1 (IST (WEST))

Milltown (Irish: Baile an Mhuilinn) is a population centre and townland in County Cavan, Ireland. The Milltown catchment area, including Milltown Electoral Division, comprises several neighboring townlands within the historical barony of Loughtee Lower and the civil parish of Drumlane. Milltown lies approximately 9 kilometres (6 mi) from the town of Killeshandra on the R201 road.

== Name ==
Milltown, in Irish Baile an Mhuilinn meaning 'townland of the mill of Drumlane', included lands belonging to the priory of Drumlane. In late medieval times, the area around Drumlane priory was referred to in the annals as An Bolgan (meaning 'belly'). With the dissolution of Drumlane priory during the 16th century, the relevant townlands became crown estates. They were distributed among wealthy landlords and adventurers such as Sir James Dillon and later, after the 1641 wars, Drumlane (including Milltown) was granted to the titled Earl Annesley family. Some 19th-century sources, including the ordnance survey letters of John O'Donovan, suggest that the village of Milltown was known for a period as 'Bellanaleck' (from Beal Atha Na Leice, meaning 'mouth of the ford of the flagstone'). A small stream runs through the centre of the village under a twin arch road bridge (R201) and borders Milltown with the townland of Money (Monea). Conjecture that perhaps this was once the site of an original water mill. This un-named stream runs through the townland of Creeney and discharges into Lough Arden part of the Lough Oughter complex of lakes feeding the Erne river system.

== History ==
Evidence of ancient settlement in the area includes a number of ringfort (rath) and crannog sites in the townlands of Derrygeeraghan, Derryvehil and Drumgesh. The Archaeological Inventory of County Cavan (1995) records the site at Derrygeeraghan as comprising a raised circular rath with two substantial earthen banks and a wide deep fosse dating from at least the early medieval period.

Milltown is also near Ardan Lough and Drumlane Lough and is known for Drumlane Abbey, a 12-century Augustinian 'St Mary the Virgin' priory church and round tower. The abbey site is located approximately one kilometer south of the village. The Archaeological Inventory of County Cavan (1995) also records two crannog sites in Drumlane Lough and Derrybrick Lough.

The parish of Drumlane/Staghall, within the Roman Catholic Diocese of Kilmore, was established in 1704.

An 18th-century record, in the 1725 register of deeds, refers to Milltown and states that a "house and farm commonly known and referred to as Milltown [is] situated in the parish of Drumlane and County of Cavan and the mill and other appurtenances there onto belonging".

Ordnance Survey maps of the Milltown area, dating from around 1837, show a Roman Catholic chapel and a National School House within the townlands of Milltown and Money (Monea). The Griffith Valuation survey of tenement dwellings, which was carried out in 1856/7, shows Milltown predominantly formed part of the Earl Annesley estate, while Money townland was part of an estate under John C. Jones representing the Bishop of Kilmore. According to sources on returns of owners of land of one acre and upwards in 1876, Annesley was then County Cavan's second biggest landowner with 24,221 acres of land. Other parts of Milltown village were under other landlords and freeholders. Later Ordnance Survey maps, produced between 1888-1913, show a range of buildings including a school, blacksmith forge, the Catholic church, parochial house and a temperance hall. The original parish of Drumlane RC Church in Milltown consisted of a thatched, barn-shaped structure described in records as a "humble shed". The present St Patrick's RC Church in Milltown dates from 1868 and was designed by William Hague.

At the time of the Great Famine (c. 1848), it was reported that the Drumlane parish population stood at around 400 persons and there was opposition locally to the building of a fever hospital built at the townland Milltown/Money crossroads. The 1901 and 1911 census lists between 83 and 93 people living in Milltown.

The earliest Milltown national school house, within the townland of Money dates from around 1824 and was probably multi-denominational under the original free national schools programme for children's education. A report published in 1826, for the Commission of Irish Education Enquiry, recorded that the teacher was Edward Roden and that there were forty pupils. A new school opened in 1863 on a site bought from the Bishop of Kilmore for the local parish.

By the end of the 19th century, there were several local businesses including shops and a public house. The village was reported as having two other ale houses and included a cooper and carpentry business, police barracks, a post office and several houses with slate roofs. The Temperance Hall opened in 1906 and grew to over 200 members, until the building was destroyed maliciously by fire in 1921. A replacement hall was built in 1939 and functioned until it was demolished in 2003 to make way for a new community centre which was officially opened in 2005. This centre includes a Gaelic games sports grounds and space for a community garden.

The dairy industry has historically had a presence in the local area. The Milltown Branch Creamery (now closed) operated for most of the 20th century as a collection point for local farmers milk delivered in churns (cans) for processing at Killeshandra Co-op Creamery into butter and other dairy products. A local farmer, Anthony Leddy (1930-2004), was national president of the Irish Creamery Milk Suppliers Association (ICMSA) between 1978-1981.

== Classification and development ==
Milltown was classified as a "rural community node" under the settlement hierarchy of the Cavan County Development Plan 2022-2028. Although not classified by Cavan County Council as a 'village', the core settlement plays a role in serving the economic, social, cultural and community needs for its residents and those living in the hinterland. A record from the National Archives, dated to October 1825, notes a complaint over the conduct of police in handling a minor civil unrest in the 'village' of Milltown.

Milltown and Drumlane are within the area of the UNESCO-designated Cuilcagh Lakelands Geopark.

== Community and sport ==
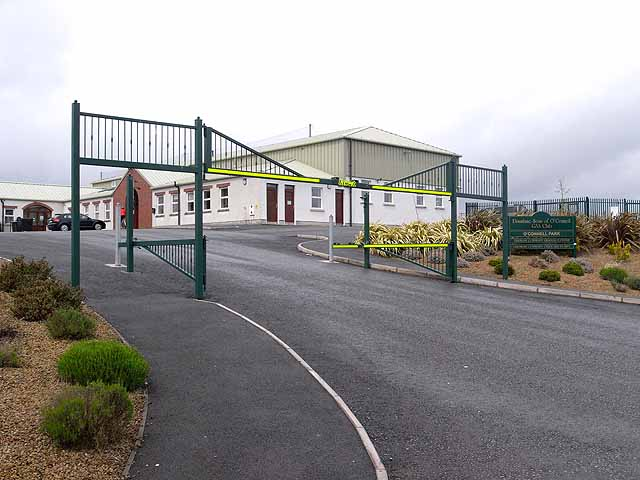
Drumlane Community Resource Centre, also home to Drumlane GAA

The Drumlane Community Partnership CLG, registered as a charity, aims to support the voluntary welfare and cultural needs of the local community across all denominational age groups for residents and visitors with a range of indoor and outdoors activities.

Milltown is home to Drumlane GAA club. Its pitch, club house and stand is located on the outskirts of the village. The club won the Cavan Senior Football Championship four times in the early 1900s.
