= Salmo nigripinnis =

Conservation status
- Vulnerable (IUCN 3.1)

Scientific classification
- Kingdom: Animalia
- Phylum: Chordata
- Class: Actinopterygii
- Division: Teleostei
- Order: Salmoniformes
- Family: Salmonidae
- Genus: Salmo
- Species: S. nigripinnis

Binomial name
- Salmo nigripinnis Günther, 1866

Species of fish

Salmo nigripinnis, also known as the sonaghen, is a species of fish within the family Salmoninae.

== Description ==
Salmo nigripinnis can range in body colour from light brown to silver, with large black spots. Fins of the species are dark brown or black, with elongated pectoral fins.

== Distribution and habitat ==
Salmo nigripinnis is endemic to Lough Melvin. Lough Melvin's waters cross the northwest border of the Republic of Ireland (County Leitrim) into Northern Ireland's County Fermanagh, meaning that this species lake habitat is in both Ireland and the United Kingdom.

S. nigripinnis live in open areas of the lake in deep water. During the months of November and December, the fish will journey to small inflowing rivers to spawn. The lake contains various plankton such as Cladocera and aquatic chironomid pupae of which S. nigripinnis feeds.
