= Seán Ó Neachtain (poet) =

- Writing career
- Genre: Poetry

Seán Ó Neachtain (c. 1645/1650 – 9 March 1729) was an Irish poet and writer.

== Biography ==
Ó Neachtain was a member of a family who originated in Máenmag but were expelled to the Fews of Athlone by either the Ua Conchobhair Kings of Connacht or the de Burgh Earls of Ulster. Seán Ó Neachtain was born at Cluain Oileáin in County Roscommon, sometime between about 1645 and 1650, during the latter stages of the Irish Confederate Wars. He left Cluain Oileáin for Dublin as a young man, perhaps as early as 1670 but certainly at a point before 1690.

== Personal life ==
Ó Neachtain was married twice, firstly to Una Nagle, who died about 1703. His second spouse was Úna Ní Bhroin, apparently a relative of Edmund Byrne, Archbishop of Dublin. Ó Neachtain's known children were Tadhg Ó Neachtain, Luke, and Anna.

== See also ==
- Tadhg Ó Neachtain, writer, c. 1670-c.1752.
- Eogan Ó Neachtain, writer, fl. 1918.
