= Tadhg Ó Neachtain =

Irish writer

Tadhg Ó Neachtain (c.1670 – c.1752) was an Irish writer, scribe and lexicographer.

== Origins ==
Described as "the fulcrum of the coterie of Irish language scholars who were working in Dublin in the early years of the eighteenth century" (2009, p. 821), Ó Neachtain was the son of Seán Ó Neachtain, who had moved from his native County Roscommon sometime between 1670 and 1691. Tadhg was apparently his eldest son, by Seán's first wife, Una Nagle (died c. 1703), perhaps born in Dublin itself, where he was to spend most of his adult life.

== The Ó Neachtain Circle ==
Between 1726 and 1728, Tadhg wrote an Irish poem which named twenty-six scholars of his acquaintance, all of whom are now included among what is retrospectively called The Ó Neachtain Circle. They included:

- Richard Tipper
- John Conry
- Tadhg Ó Rodaighe
- John Fergus (Eoin Ó Fearghusa)
- Charles O'Conor (historian)
- Seon Mac Solaidh

== Personal life ==
Ó Neachtain was married four times. His spouses and their children were as follows:

- Caitríona Níc Fheorais, died 1714 – a son, Peter Ó Neachtain (born 1709), became a Jesuit.
- Máire Ní Chomáin – died in childbirth late in 1715.
- Máire Ní Reachtagáin, died 1733.
- Isabel Ní Lárrach, died 1745.
