= Kinlough =

Village in County Leitrim, Ireland

Kinlough Irish: Cionn Locha
- Village
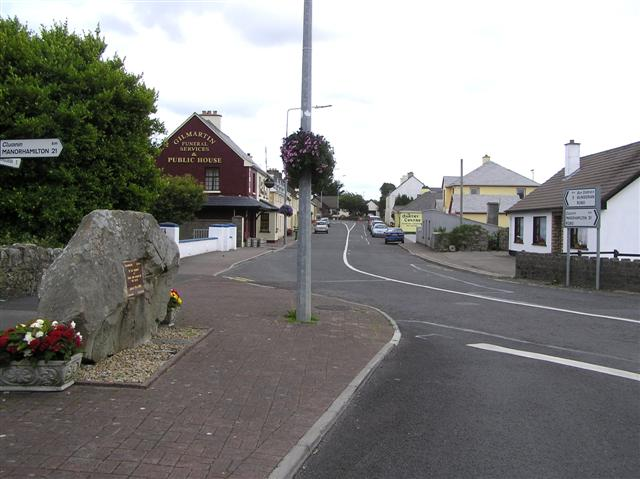
- Kinlough village.

- Location in Ireland
- Coordinates: 54°27′00″N 8°17′00″W
- Country: Ireland
- Province: Connacht
- County: County Leitrim
- Barony: Rosclogher

Population (2022)
  - Total: 1,196
- Irish Grid Reference: G816557

Kinlough (/kɪnˈlɒx/ kin-LOKH; Irish: Cionn Locha, meaning 'head of the lake') is a large village in north County Leitrim. It lies between the Dartry Mountains and the Atlantic Ocean, and between the River Duff and the River Drowes, at the head of Lough Melvin. It borders County Donegal and County Fermanagh, both in Ulster, and is near Yeats Country in County Sligo. It lies 2.5 miles from Bundoran in County Donegal, and across Lough Melvin from the village of Garrison in County Fermanagh.

== Amenities ==
The village has a pre-school, montessori school, after school care, primary school, community pitch, community hall and a Church of Ireland and a Catholic church, pubs, restaurants and take-aways.

== Demographics ==
The village population stood at approximately 350 since the Great Famine. Back in 1925, Kinlough comprised 44 houses with 5 being licensed to sell alcohol. The 2006 census showed an increase for the first time in one hundred and fifty years. The 2011 census figures showed the population at 1,018, an increase of 47% on 2006. As of April 2022, the population was 1,036.

== Tourist attractions ==
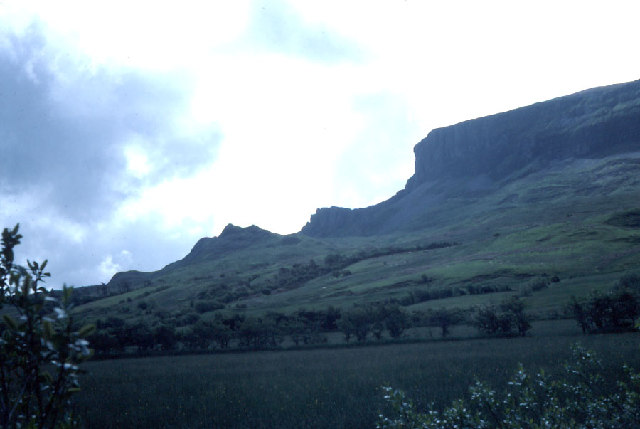
The Glennans, Kinlough

Lough Melvin (Irish: Loch Meilbhe) is internationally renowned for its unique range of plants and animals. As well as its early run of Atlantic Salmon, the lake boasts three trout species including the legendary Giolla Rua. The first salmon of the year is caught regularly on the River Drowes which runs from the lake. Within the catchment area, the endangered globeflower, molinia meadows and sessile oak woodlands can be found. Lough Melvin straddles the border with part of it in Garrison, County Fermanagh. The view from the village looks up to The Dartry Mountain often mistakenly referred to as 'Aroo Mountain' probably because Aroo Lough is situated on the south side of the mountain. Ahanlish, Glenade and Truskmore Mountains are also visible.

Nearby at Glenade (about 7.5 miles south east) is Poll na mBear (Cave of the Bears) where some of the best preserved examples of Irish brown bear bones were recovered by cavers in May 1997.

== Education ==
The Four Masters National School is the village primary school. It is named after the Annals of the Four Masters, historical writings produced by Irish historians of the early 17th century.

== Transport ==
Kinlough is served by two Bus Éireann routes on Fridays for Route 483 to Sligo and route 495 to Manorhamilton. Both routes also provide a link between Kinlough, Bundoran and Ballyshannon.

== People ==
- Arthur Kerr (1877–1942), botanist, born in Kinlough.
- Sir Jim Kilfedder (1928–1995); born in Kinlough but raised in County Fermanagh. He became a prominent unionist politician in Northern Ireland.
