= Drumlane =

Townland in County Cavan, Ireland

Coordinates: 54°03′26″N 7°28′41″W

Drumlane Droim Leathain
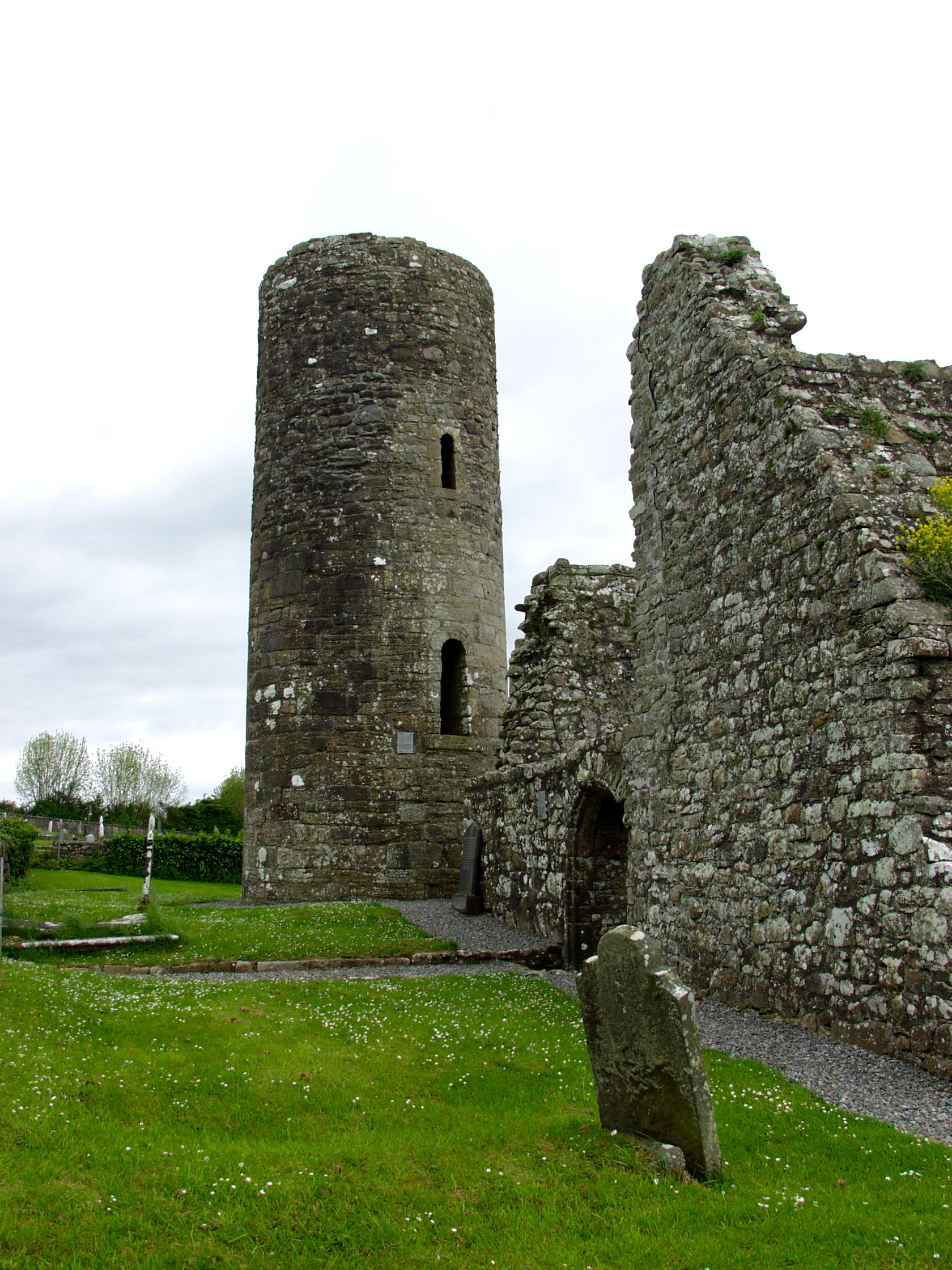
- Interactive map of Drumlane; Droim Leathain

Monastery information
- Order: Augustinian
- Established: 6th century
- Disestablished: 16th century
- Diocese: Diocese of Kilmore

People
- Founder: Saint Columba
- Important associated figures: Patron Saint Mogue; Ó Faircheallaigh

Site
- Location: Milltown, County Cavan, Ireland

National monument of Ireland
- Official name: Drumlane
- Reference no.: 4

Drumlane (Irish: Droim Leathan, meaning 'Broad Ridge') is a townland near the village of Milltown in County Cavan, Ireland. The area of Drumlane is approximately 85.76 hectares (211.93 acres). Drumlane is also the name of the civil parish in which the townland is situated. Christianity was introduced to Drumlane in 555 by Saint Columba, and Saint Máedóc of Ferns, known locally as Saint Mogue, founded an early Drumlane monastery. Saint Mogue made the Connachta nobleman Faircheallaigh the first Abbot of Drumlane at the end of the sixth century, and his Ó Faircheallaigh descendants were historically the Abbots of Drumlane. The name Drumlane denotes the drumlin region of low hilly ribbed moraines formed over a limestone bedrock created by the movement of glacial ice and melt water during the last ice age. Several townlands in the neighbourhood are prefixed with the word 'Drum' (Droim), while several others are prefixed with the word 'Derry' (Doire), which is Irish for oak.

== History ==
There is recorded evidence of people living and farming around the neighbourhood of Drumlane for over two thousand years. This is seen mainly on maps and on land in the form of ringforts and enclosures. In the nearby Derrybrick Lough there are the remains of crannogs which are man-made islands used for accommodation. The most profoundly unique feature of this countryside comes in the form of a ruined Augustinian monastic church and round tower. The early Christian site at Drumlane is said to date back to Saint Columba around 555. Drumlane was later developed by Saint Mogue, from whom many miraculous stories and legends arise. Significant Church developments began in Ireland during the 12th century with St Malachy of Armagh's creation of archbishoprics at Armagh and Cashel. A Synod of Kells in 1152 began further changes where the Kingdom of Breifni became the new Tir Briuin diocese boundary stretching from Kells in Meath to Sligo. Drumlane, being the midpoint of the new Breifne Tir Briuin Diocese to come under the jurisdiction of the Abbot of Kells, order of Arrosian Canons Regular St. Mary's Abbey of Kells. Drumlane priory formed around the year 1143 was called afterwards St. Mary's Priory Drumlane until the Dissolution of the Monasteries in the mid-16th century.

Notable historic events were recorded in the Annals of the Four Masters and in the Annals of Clonmacnoise, that in 836 Drumlane was attacked by Viking raiders along with other abbeys at Devenish Island on the river Erne. Clones Abbey was also attacked during these raids. The King of Breifne Tighearnan O'Ruairc (1124–1172) gave patronage to the early diocese, But in 1246 it was recorded that Drumlane church was burned during a feud between rival Breifne clans O'Rourke lords of West Breifne and the O'Reillys of East Breifne. Significant also then that Drumlane was once a town on the borderline between east and west Breifne, also burial grounds for O'Rourke and O'Reilly clan chiefs. Battles at Drumlane took place from 1261 between Hugh O'Conor, king of Connacht and Hugh O'Reilly, followed by further battles in 1314 and 1338, where the O'Conors and the Ruairc's defeated the O'Reilly clan. Eventually peace was settled in 1391 between the rival factions when Breifne was divided into Lordships between the rival O'Reilly and O'Ruairc clan leaders. In 1431, Papal records describe alms needed to rebuild Drumlane priory with cloisters and a refectory. Then in 1436, the Pope appointed Patrick Ó Faircheallaigh as Canon (Coarb) of St. Mary's Drumlane priory, then a dependency under the Abbey of Kells. An interesting charter of 19 September 1438 exists which grants the erenaghship of Drumlane to Nicholas Ó Faircheallaigh. It was around this time that the Pope agreed to a request from Bishop McBrady to build a cathedral church for a Kilmore diocese within east Breifne. Drumlane would continue thereafter as a parish church together with a teaching house for priests of the Breifne/Kilmore diocese, combined under the secular rule of the independent Drumlane Augustinian priory.

Internal O'Reilly clan feuds continued, and in 1487, Edmund and Fergal O'Reilly attacked Clogh Oughter castle, occupied by their uncle John O'Reilly. Retribution came swiftly, and Fergal was killed (buried at Drumlane), and Drumlane town, where Edmund O'Reilly lived, was burned in punishment. O'Reilly clan feuds around Drumlane continued in 1512, while the last mention from papal records was in 1538 before the priory and church were confiscated in 1539 under the rule of Henry VIII, King of England to the Archbishop of Dublin and later granted to Hugh O'Reilly in 1567 under lease. However the O'Reillys still carried out their depredations as we find a raid on Drumlane c. 1570 by Toirdhealbhach, nicknamed 'An Prióir Balbh', the illegitimate son of the chief, Aodh Conallach O'Reilly. When Hugh O'Reilly died in 1583, it was disclosed that he had only ever paid one half of one years rent on all of his leased properties, leading to forfeiture of the Cavan monastic lands and sold as the crown administrators saw fit. Drumlane was Cavan's richest ecclesiastical foundation, consisting of 32 polls (around 800 acres of pasture and arable land). Drumlane church was re-granted to the reformed Anglican Diocese of Kilmore and used for Protestant church worship, while the priory buildings were left to decay. A new church called St. Columba's was erected by the Church of Ireland by 1821 and the old Drumlane church was then un-roofed, abandoned until being transferred into State ownership as a National Monument in 1882.

== Drumlane architecture ==
The original monastic structures at Drumlane were built from wood gathered from the nearby oak forests, having deteriorated over centuries of weather and raids from Vikings and rival clans. From the twelfth century, when under Augustinian monastic jurisdiction the entire structure was rebuilt using local stone to a traditional Hiberno-Romanesque and Gothic Irish church and round tower design, using styles similar to many other monastic buildings in Connacht and elsewhere. The craftsmanship used in constructing the round tower was a key statement of prestige for its time, which perhaps the O'Rourke kings of Breifne wanted to create 'pride of place' within the new Breifne Tir Briuin diocese. Other building works probably came from donations paid by prominent local farmers and pilgrims to view St. Mogues relics at Drumlane. From the mid-12th century, Drumlane priory came under Arrosian Augustinian Canons jurisdiction from the abbot of St. Mary's Abbey in Kells. The Drumlane church was a basic nave and screened chancel measuring (inside) 32.6 metres long by 6.1 metres wide. There is evidence of various stages of construction and significant modifications over the centuries, from the late twelfth and early thirteenth century became a 'Transition' period, when late stages of Hiberno Romanesque style architecture gave way to the English Gothic styles being introduced to church construction all around the country. Typical twelfth-century works can be seen in the construction of the doors and windows of the round tower using rounded head openings. The west doorway of the church is similar round-headed fashioned with dog-tooth design typical of several twelfth-century churches. The windows and doorways in the south and north walls come from a later period using medieval arched forms, while some are hooded (original English style) Gothic design, which became popular from the early thirteenth century. The tall three-light east window design is set with the remains of flamboyant tracery (probably 15th century). On the outside, set beside the east window, there are the carved heads of a bearded king and his queen (perhaps 12th-century benefactors of the church) along with the head of a bishop or abbot. Fragments of decorative masonry remain within the church and outside include the remains of medieval pillars and a richly carved 'impost' that could have supported an arched cloister or screen structure. Another richly carved stone believed to be a tomb slab stands inside the church against the north wall. There are tomb niches and sedilia located in the south wall, also a Romanesque style doorway chevron fragment (c1170), which perhaps could have come from the priory building once located about one hundred metres south from the church. Drumlane Round Tower shows signs that it was built or rebuilt in two stages. The symbolic stone structure which stands beside the church and is the only remaining round tower in the Church of Ireland Diocese of Kilmore.

Today, the buttressed ruin of Drumlane church with its round tower standing 11.6 metres tall and 15.8 metres around the base circumference represents a significant structure of the late medieval period, while little remains today of the old priory buildings, which fell into decay after the dissolution of the monasteries in around 1538. From the mid seventeenth century the abbey church became used for Anglican parish worship until around 1820 when a nearby new St Columba church was built for Anglican worship. The old Drumlaane church and round tower then was unroofed, become abandoned and allowed to decay into ruins. Later to be handed over to the Commissioners of Public Works by Church of Ireland authorities under The Irish Church Act 1869 to be preserved as National Monuments, presently under stewardship by OPW. The old graveyard meanwhile, with several headstones dating from the 18th century and still used by some local families is protected by Cavan County Council and maintained by local parish communities.

== Archaeology Research at Drumlane ==
During the summer of 2021, a Topography and Geophysical survey was carried out of the lesser-known St Mary Priory site by the local Drumlane History and Heritage Group, together with a large gathering of enthusiastic community helpers. The priory site is designated as a National Monument Ecclesiastical Residence and Field System, located in a farmer's pasture field around one hundred metres south of the church and the round tower ruins. The project was financially supported by the Heritage Council, together with assistance from the Heritage Office of Cavan County Council. A resistance magnetic gradiometry survey was carried out over a large area of the field containing what was known from Ordnance Survey maps as an ecclesiastical residence. An earth resistance survey was carried out of the core area, identifying the sub-surface footprint of a building measuring around 25 metres in length by 20 metres wide. Without trench digging, it is therefore reasonable to conjecture that this was in fact once a substantial range of ecclesiastical buildings, as described in historic documentation, including a chapel and accommodation for Augustinian canons from the late medieval period.

== Saints of Drumlane Abbey ==
- Saint Columba (founded Drumlane c. 555 AD)
- Patron Saint Mogue
- Saint Danem (Feast Day 13 November)
- Saint Indecht (Feast Day 11 August)

Abbots of Drumlane (heirs to the patron saint)

- Faircheallaigh, Abbot of Drumlane (624–)
- Maelchiaráin Ó Faircheallaigh, Abbot of Drumlane (?)
- Cúduilig Ó Faircheallaigh, Abbot of Drumlane (?)
- Records lost through 965 (see the burning of Drumlane)
- Conchobhar Ó Faircheallaigh, Abbot of Drumlane (965–)
- Dubhinsi Ó Faircheallaigh, Abbot of Drumlane (–1025)
- Conaig Ó Faircheallaigh, Abbot of Drumlane (–1059)
- Muiredach Ó Faircheallaigh, Abbot of Drumlane (–1257)
- Niall Ó Faircheallaigh, Abbot of Drumlane (–1357)
- William Ó Faircheallaigh, Abbot of Drumlane (–1368)
- Muiredach Ó Faircheallaigh, Abbot of Drumlane (1368–)
- William Ó Faircheallaigh, Abbot of Drumlane (–1400)
- Maurice Ó Faircheallaigh, Abbot of Drumlane (1400–)
- Muiredach Ó Faircheallaigh, Abbot of Drumlane (–1438)
- Nicholas Ó Faircheallaigh, Abbot of Drumlane (1438–)
- Hugh O’Maelmocheirghe, Abbot of Drumlane (–1512)

== Priors of Drumlane Abbey ==
- Conaig Ó Faircheallaigh (–1059)
- Peter Magauran (–1431)
- Patrick Ó Faircheallaigh (1431–1436)
- Patrick Ó Faircheallaigh (1436–1439)
- Cormac Mác Shamhradháin (1439–1444; later Bishop of Ardagh)
- Thady Magauran (1444–1455)
- Peter Magauran (1456–)
- John MacBrien (1467–)
- Cormac Mág Shamhradháin (1467–1511; also Bishop of Kilmore)
- Ferdinand Farrelly (–1651–)
- Andrew Magaghran (–1678–)

== Parish Priests of Drumlane ==
- William Ó Faircheallaigh (–1400)
- Maurice Ó Faircheallaigh (1400–1401)
- David Ó Faircheallaigh (1401–1410)
- Brian Ó Faircheallaigh (–1484)
- Ferdinand Farrelly (1631–?)
- Andrew Magaghran (1652–1705)
- Edmund Magaghran (1705–1726)
- Bernard MacHenry (1739–1749)
- Thomas Fitzsimons (1750–1769)
- Owen O’Reilly (1782–1790)
- Farrell O’Reilly (1790–1807; later Bishop of Kilmore)
- Nicholas Brady (Upper Drumlane; 1815–1835)
- Patrick McCabe (Lower Drumlane; 1815–1835)
- Patrick McCabe (Upper & Lower Drumlane; 1835–1843)
- Philip Donegan (1843–1854)
- Patrick O’Reilly (1854–1880)
- Bernard Finegan (1880–1886; later Bishop of Kilmore)
- Edward MacGennis (1886–1888; later Bishop of Kilmore)
- James Brady (15 April 1888 – 18 February 1918; retired)
- Patrick Magauran (18 February 1918 – 11 July 1920; died)
- Bernard Carolan (27 August 1920 – 21 August 1923; died)
- Charles Magee (20 October 1923 – 28 December 1938; died)
- John Brady (21 March 1939 – 14 December 1943; transferred)
- Peter O’Reilly (14 December 1943 – 26 January 1949; transferred)
- Patrick MacGibney (26 January 1949 – 22 June 1955; died)
- Arthur J. MacMahon (27 August 1955 – 31 March 1982; retired)
- Patrick Callaghan (20 July 1974 – 21 August 1982; retired as Parish Priest, remained as Curate)
- Joseph C. Young (21 August 1982 – 26 August 1989; retired)
- Bernard Doyle (26 August 1989–)
- Gerard Comiskey (current Parish Priest)

== Curates of Drumlane ==
Drumlane parish had two curacies, one at Drumlane and one at Staghall.

Staghall Curates

- Patrick Trainor (1839–1840; transferred)
- Patrick Brady (1840–1841; died)
- Patrick Gilroy (1841–1853; transferred)
- Michael Clancy (1844–1846; transferred)
- Peter Brady (1878–1879; transferred)
- Bernard Carolan (1900–1905; transferred)
- John Brady (1906–1907; transferred)
- Thomas J. Bradley (1907–1909; transferred)
- Francis McGowan (1911–1920; died)
- Edward MacGennis (1924–1927; transferred)
- Laurence Corr (1927–1929; transferred)
- Alexander J. MacCabe (1929–1930; transferred)
- Walter J. McGrath (1930–1935; transferred)
- Thomas Galligan (1935–1939; transferred)
- Patrick Callaghan (1982–1986; retired)

Milltown Curates

- Charles O’Reilly (–1844–1851)
- Peter Connolly (–1919–)
- Thomas J. Bradley (1922–1934; transferred)
