= Garrison, County Fermanagh =

Village in County Fermanagh, Ireland

Coordinates: 54.4148°N 8.0912°W

Garrison: Irish: an Garastún
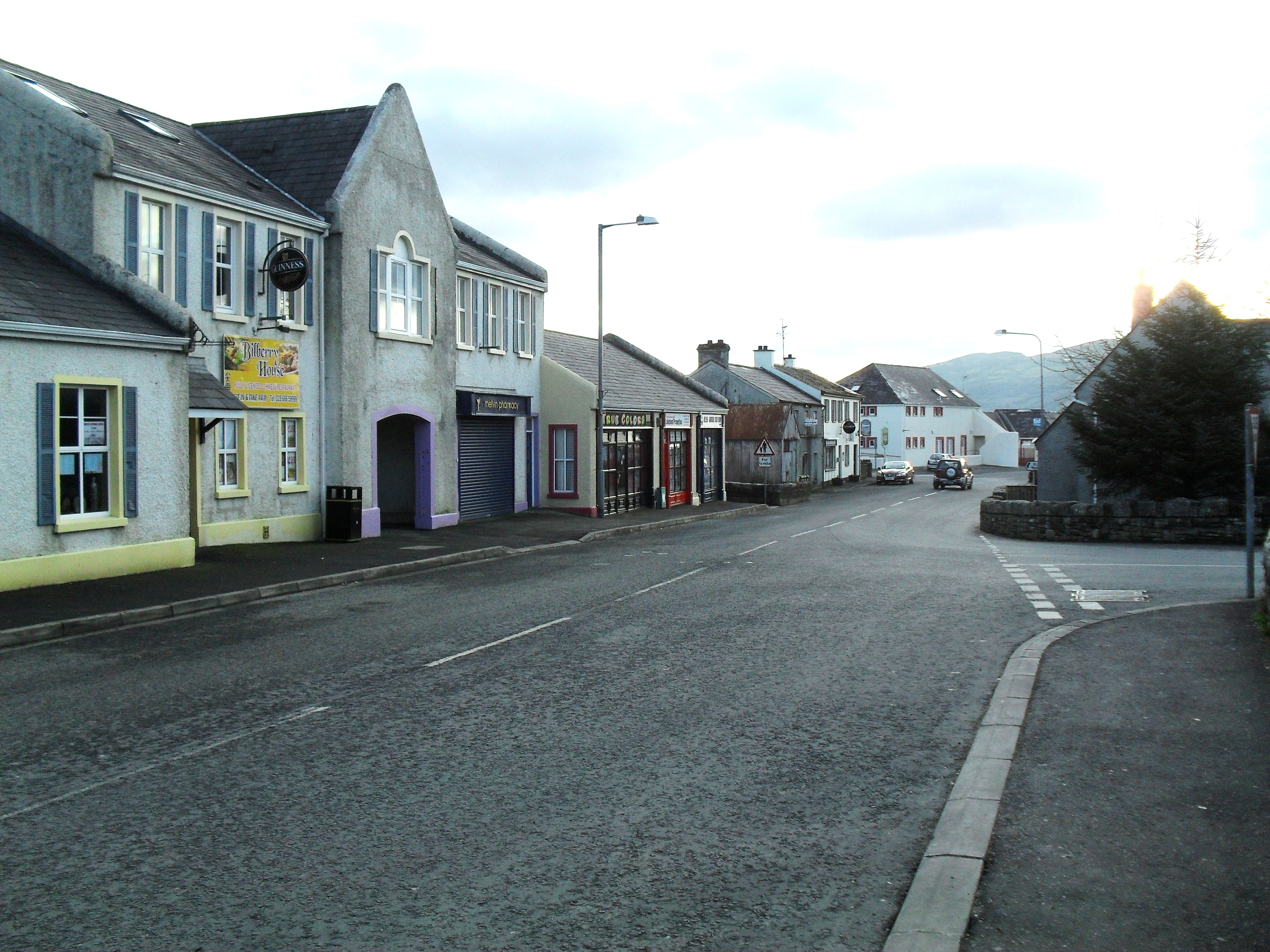

- Location within Northern Ireland
- Population: 411 (2021 census)
- Irish grid reference: G941518
  - Belfast: 109 miles
- District: Fermanagh and Omagh
- County: County Fermanagh
- Country: Northern Ireland
- Sovereign state: United Kingdom
- Post town: ENNISKILLEN
- Postcode district: BT93
- Dialling code: 028, +44 28
- UK Parliament: Fermanagh and South Tyrone
- NI Assembly: Fermanagh and South Tyrone

Garrison is a village near Lough Melvin in County Fermanagh, Northern Ireland. The Roogagh River runs through the village. In the 2021 census it had a population of 411 people. It is situated within Fermanagh and Omagh district.

== Toponymy ==
The village's name comes from a military barracks and its garrison of troops established in the village by William III of England, following the Battle of Aughrim in 1691.

== History ==
Garrison was one of several border villages in Fermanagh that would have been transferred to the Irish Free State had the recommendations of the Irish Boundary Commission been enacted in 1925.

The Melvin Hotel, previously owned by the McGovern family, was blown up in January 1972 during the middle of a Catholic wedding reception, by the IRA, reportedly as retaliation for allowing members of the security forces to stay on the premises.

The Police Service of Northern Ireland came under gun attack in the town on 21 November 2009.

== Tourism ==
Tourist activities in the area include golfing, fishing, hill-walking, water sports, horse-riding, cycling, camping and caving. The Lough Melvin Holiday Centre is in the area.

== Transport ==
Ulsterbus route 64 serves Garrison on Thursday with two journeys to Belleek and Belcoo and one journey to Letterbreen and Enniskillen. Belleek, approximately five miles away, is served by Bus Éireann route 30 every two hours each way for most of the day plus an overnight coach. This route operates to Donegal, Cavan, Dublin Airport and Dublin.

== Lough Melvin ==
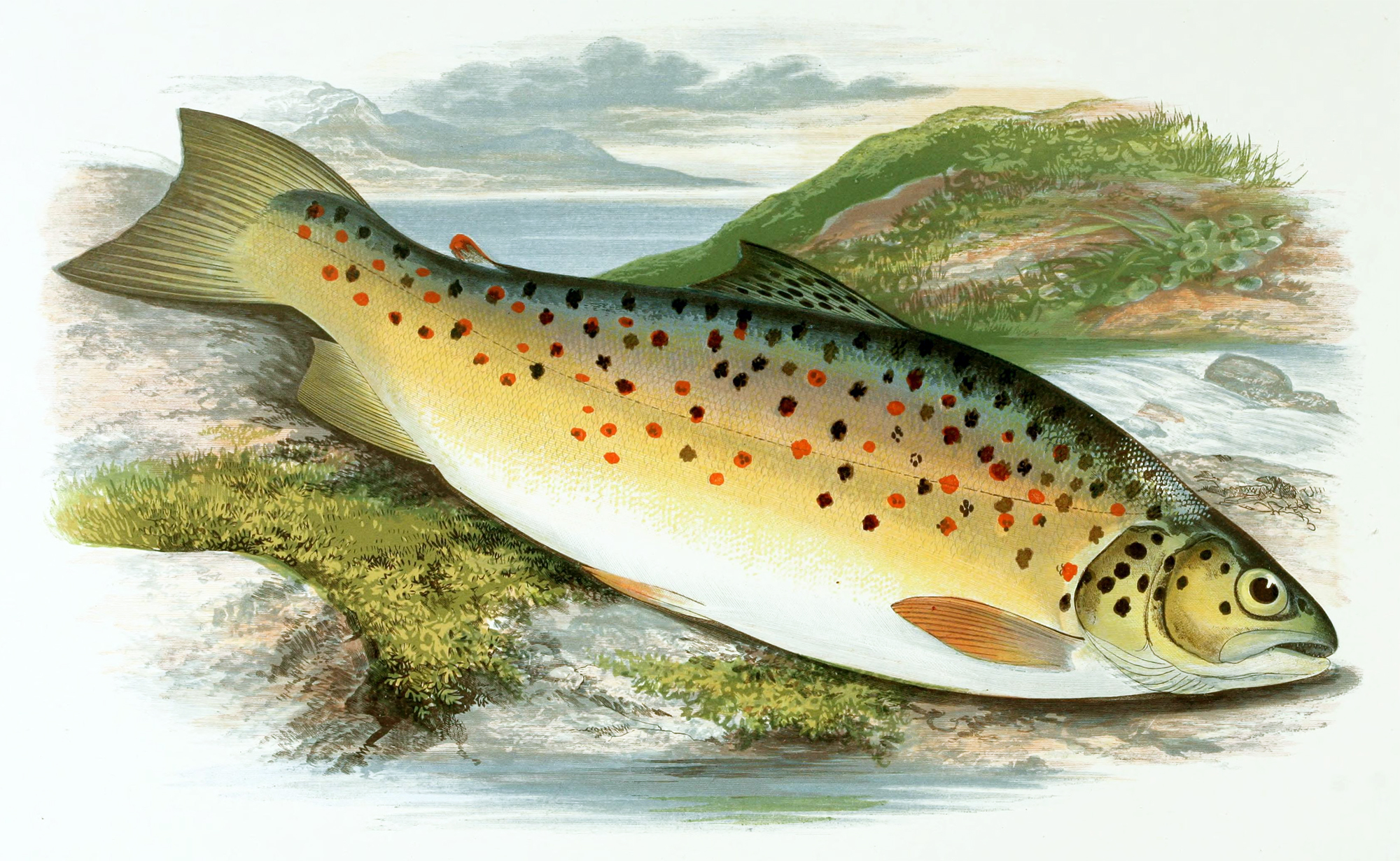
Gillaroo

Lough Melvin, which to the west of Garrison village, is home to the gillaroo or 'salmo stomachius', a species of trout which eats primarily snails. The name 'gillaroo' is derived from the Irish giolla rua meaning 'red fellow'. This is due to the distinctive golden colour on its flanks with bright crimson and vermillion spots. While other lakes also contain the gillaroo, a unique gene found in the Lough Melvin trout has not been found in other populations and experiments carried out by Queen's University Belfast established that the Lough Melvin gillaroo species has not been found anywhere else in the world.

The sonaghan trout (Salmo nigripinnis) is a sub-species of trout that is also unique to Lough Melvin.

== Notable residents ==
- Mick Moohan, one time cabinet minister in the New Zealand Government

== See also ==
- List of townlands in County Fermanagh
- List of towns and villages in Northern Ireland
- B52 road (Northern Ireland)
