= Rossinver =

Village in County Leitrim, Ireland

Rosinver Ros Inhbir
- Interactive map of Rosinver; Ros Inhbir

Monastery information
- Order: Augustinian
- Established: 7th century
- Disestablished: 16th century
- Diocese: Diocese of Kilmore

People
- Founder: Saint Máedóc of Ferns
- Important associated figures: Fearghus (1st Abbot)

Site
- Location: County Leitrim, Connacht, Ireland

Rosinver
- Village
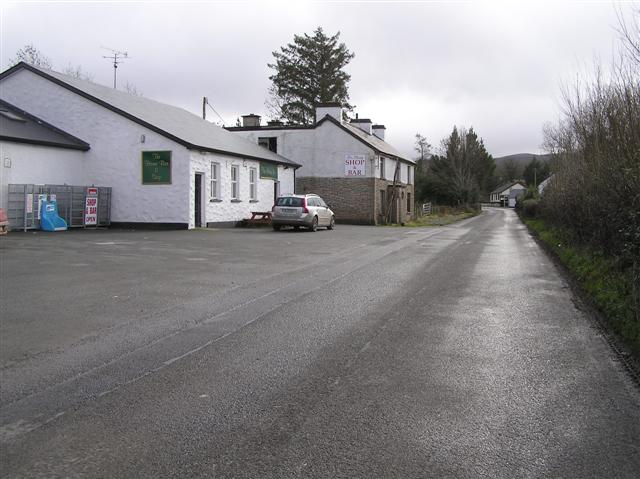
- R282 road in village

- Location in Ireland
- Coordinates: 54°23′19″N 8°06′35″W
- Elevation: 65 m (213 ft)
- Time zone: UTC+0 (WET)
  - Summer (DST): UTC-1 (IST (WEST))
- Irish Grid Reference: G929488

Rossinver or Rosinver (Irish: Ros Inbhir, meaning 'the peninsula of the river mouth') is a small village in north County Leitrim, Ireland. The village is home to a retired monastery of the same name and is at the southern shore of Lough Melvin, home to two rare species of trout – the Gillaroo and the Sonaghan – as well as the common brown trout. There is a fishery at Eden Quay and boats and gillies are available locally. There is a mile-long river walk to Fowley's Falls on the Glenaniff River which follows a series of waterfalls.

== History ==
The first church on the site was founded by Saint Máedóc of Ferns who died in Country Leitrim circa 632. Before he died, Saint Máedóc made the Connachta nobleman Fearghus Mac Ailill his hereditary heir to Rosinver Abbey and Fearghus was the first Abbot of Rosinver. The Ó Fearghuis later left County Leitrim to conquer the territory of Annaly in the neighbouring County Longford.

A 9th-century grave slab lies in the churchyard and Lisdarush Iron Age Fort and Abbey are nearby. The church is located on the northeastern side of a graveyard which has a number of cross slabs of Early Christian date, a slab bearing rock art and a fragment of trefoil-headed arcading among the much later burial monuments of the second millennium. As for much of the Irish monasteries, Rosinver Abbey was dissolved in the Dissolution of the Monasteries in the 16th century. MacClancy Castle, also nearby, was a place of refuge on Lough Melvin for survivors and shipwrecked sailors from the Spanish Armada of 1588. There is a related plaque at the lakeside. Rosinver Abbey has otherwise been known throughout history as Gubalaun Abbey or St. Mogue's Church (Mogue being a pet name for Saint Máedóc). The church is a dilapidated medieval masonry building undergoing conservation works as of 2020.

== Transport ==
On Fridays, Bus Éireann route 470 provides a link to Manorhamilton to connect with the express to Sligo.

== See also ==
- List of towns and villages in Ireland
- Aber and Inver (placename elements)
