= Lough Melvin =

Lake in Counties Leitrim and Fermanagh, Ireland

- Loch Meilbhe (Irish)
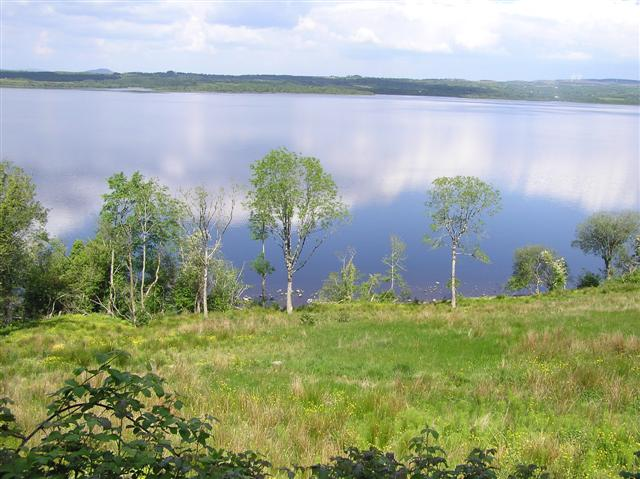

- Location in Ireland
- Location: County Leitrim and County Fermanagh
- Coordinates: 54°26′N 8°10′W
- Primary outflows: River Drowes
- Catchment area: 265 km^{2} (102 sq mi)
- Basin countries: Ireland and the United Kingdom
- Max. length: 12 km (7.5 mi)
- Max. width: 3 km (1.9 mi)
- Surface area: 21.25 km^{2} (8.20 sq mi)
- Max. depth: 45 m (148 ft)
- Islands: Inishtemple, Inishkeen, Inishmean, Inisheher, Gorminish, Bilberry Island
- Settlements: Garrison, Rossinver, Buckode, Kinlough

Lough Melvin (/lɒx ˈmɛlvɪn/ lokh-MEL-vin; Irish: Loch Meilbhe) is a lake in the northwest of the island of Ireland on the border between County Leitrim (in Ireland) and County Fermanagh (in the United Kingdom). It is internationally renowned for its unique range of plants and animals.

== Ecology ==
The water quality was reported to be excellent c. 2001 – c. 2003 with an oligotrophic rating. (Note: Trophic states of "Oligotrophic" and "Mesotrophic" are desirable, but freshwater lakes rated 'Eutrophic' or 'Hypertrophic' indicates pollution.) The ecology of Lough Melvin, and other Irish waterways, remain threatened by curly waterweed, zebra mussel, and freshwater clam invasive species.

== Fishes and angling ==
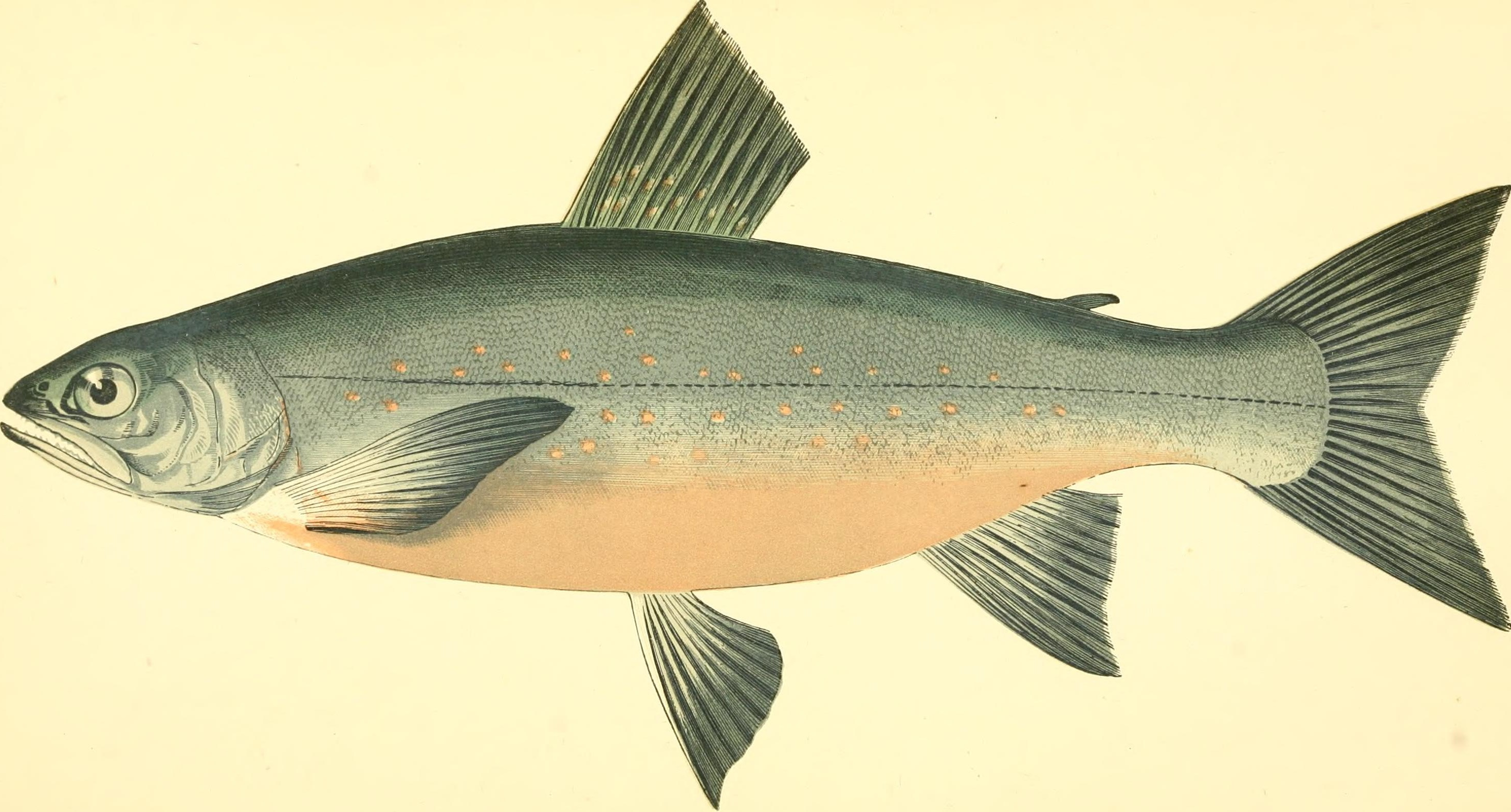
The Lough Melvin charr (Salvelinus grayi), a species unique to the lake. Now critically endangered.

Lough Melvin is one of Ireland's famous angling loughs offering the chance of spring salmon from February to May, grilse from May to July and gillaroo, sonaghen and ferox trout throughout the season. Lough Melvin is also home to an endemic species of char, the Melvin charr or Gray's charr (Salvelinus grayi).

A ghillie or boatman is strongly recommended to anglers unfamiliar with the lake.

=== Gillaroo trout ===
Lough Melvin is home to the gillaroo or Salmo stomachius, a species of trout which eats primarily snails. The name "gillaroo" is derived from the Irish language Giolla Rua, which means "Red Fellow". This is due to the fish's distinctive colouring. It has a bright buttery golden colour in its flanks with bright crimson and vermillion spots. The gillaroo feed almost exclusively on bottom living animals (snails, sedge fly larva and freshwater shrimp) with the exception of late summer when they come to the surface to feed and may be caught on the dry fly.

=== Sonaghen trout ===
The sonaghen trout (Salmo nigripinnis) is another species of salmonid unique to Lough Melvin. It can have a light brown or silvery hue with large, distinctive black spots. Its fins are dark brown or black with elongated pectorals. Sonaghen are found in areas of open, deep water, where they feed on mid-water planktonic organisms such as water fleas (Cladocera), midge (chironomid) pupae and phantom (Chaoborus) larvae. Sonaghen will be most readily located close to the surface over deep water. Fly-fishing with a team of wet flies fished in classic lough style (i.e. short, snappy casts from a boat drifting beam-on to the breeze) gives best chance of success. Sonaghen give a powerful and energetic fight out of all proportion to their size.

=== Ferox trout ===
The classic work carried out by Andrew Ferguson of Queens University on the genetics of the trout of Lough Melvin identified the ferox as a separate subspecies. The fish home to a specific spawning area and are reproductively isolated. They are also one of the oldest trout races to colonise Ireland, perhaps as old as 50,000 years. Ferox cannibalise brown trout (which returned to many of the same lakes when geological processes and climatic conditions allowed) and also prey on other fish species. The best method of capture is trolling, particularly with a Rapala type lure.

== Panoramic view ==
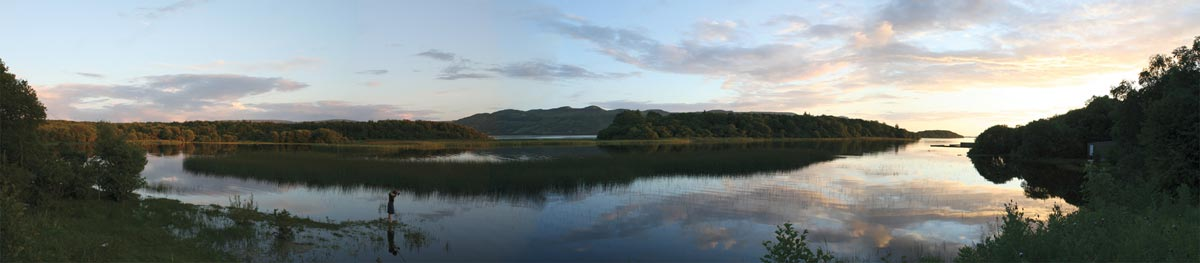

== See also ==
- List of loughs in Ireland
- Dollaghan

== References and notes ==
=== Secondary sources ===
- Clenaghan, Conor; Clinton, Frank; Crowe, Matthew (2005). Phosphorus Regulations National Implementation Report (PDF) (Report). Environmental Protection Agency, Office of Environmental Enforcement.
- Pedreschi, D.; Kelly-Quinn, M.; Caffrey, J; O'Grady, M.; Mariani, S.; Phillimore, A. (2014), "Genetic structure of pike (Esox lucius) reveals a complex and previously unrecognized colonization history of Ireland", Journal of Biogeography, 41 (3), Journal of Biogeography, 41(3), 548–560.: 548–560, doi:10.1111/jbi.12220, PMC 4238397, PMID 25435649
