= Richard Tipper =

Irish scribe

Richard Tipper or Tupper (Irish: Risteard Tuibear; died 1730) was an Irish scribe. He lived at Mitchelstown in the parish of Castleknock, County Dublin. According to the historian Paul Walsh, he left a considerable body of manuscripts, a number of which are "divided between Dublin and the British Museum". Of these manuscripts, the "earliest known to Mr. Robin Flower is dated 1709, and contains Lives of Saints". Walsh also states that:

"Perhaps his most ambitious effort is the incomplete transcript of the Book of Ballymote which is now in the Library of Trinity College, Dublin, and runs to no less than 622 pages. It bears the dates 1727 and 1728. Edward O'Reilly, speaking of its contents, says, that "to the industry of Tipper, the Irish scholar and antiquarian is indebted for many copies of ancient MSS., which he made from originals that are either not extant, or are locked up in libraries from the public."" Tipper left no Irish composition of his own."
