= Henry Cary (Archdeacon of Killala) =

Irish Anglican priest

Henry Cary (1717–1769) was the last surviving child of Rev Mordecai Cary, D.D., Bishop of Killala (1687–1751) and Catherine Courthorpe.

== Early years ==
Cary was baptised on 2 June 1717 at London’s St Andrew Undershaft church, while his father was rector of St Katherine Coleman, an old church which was demolished in 1734 and rebuilt in 1741 (and closed and demolished in 1926).

In 1731, his father was appointed as chaplain to Lionel Sackville, 1st Duke of Dorset, and accompanied him to Ireland on Sept 11, 1731 where Sackville was sworn in as Lord Lieutenant of Ireland. Seven months later, on 1 April 1732, Mordecai was consecrated Bishop of Clonfert, Co. Galway. On the Duke's visit in 1735, he consecrated Mordecai as Bishop of Killala, Co. Mayo.

Cary attended Trinity College, Dublin from 1733, graduating in 1737. He was appointed Prebendary of Lackan in 1741 and became Archdeacon of Killala in 1742, serving under his father. The Dean of Killala, at the time, was Theophilus Brocas, whose daughter, Henrietta, married Henry's son, William.

== Personal life ==
=== Marriages and children ===
The young couple of Cary's first marriage were wed at St Mary's Church, Mary Street, Dublin, on 12 February 1742/3 by prerogative lycence (sic), The Dublin Gazette of Tuesday 15 February 1742/3 reads

"Rev. Henry Cary, son of the Bishop of Killala was on last Saturday married to Miss Mary DEERING, a young lady of great beauty, merit and a fortune of £5000 sterling."

Mary was the daughter of Henry Deering/Dering, by Mary King, daughter of Sir Robert King, 1st Baronet. Henry Dering was son of Charles Dering (Auditor of the Exchequer in Ireland) by Margaret Moore, and was a grandson of Edward Dering, 2nd Baronet, of Surrenden-Dering, Pluckley, Kent. There was quite an involved marriage settlement.

The Carys had at least five children, four sons:

- Henry (b.1743) a captain in the Irish Volunteers, Portarlington Infantry, married Anne Gore, daughter of Paul Annesley Gore of Belleck, in 1767.
- William (1745–1834) a captain with the 1st (Royal) Regiment of Foot, married Henrietta Brocas, in 1771, and was the father of Rev Henry Francis Cary, translator of Dante's Divine Comedy, and grandfather of Henry Cary (judge), the first judge on the bench for the Cumberland area of the District Court of New South Wales.
- Robert (1748–1800) a captain in the 63rd Foot, married Henrietta Burrell, in 1773.
- Charles (1751–1786) a Dublin merchant, married Susanna Rainsford.

and one daughter:

- The birth of a daughter was announced in April 1747, but she did not survive and is possibly one of the four grandchildren buried near Bishop Mordecai in Killala Cathedral.

Mary died in Trim on 1 July 1756, leaving four boys whose ages ranged from five to thirteen. Henry Cary resettled in Portarlington, County Laois which is 133 miles by road from Killala, but continued as Archdeacon of Killala. Three months after the death of his first wife, he married Deborah Hamon at St Paul's French Church, Portarlington, on 2 October 1756. She was the daughter of Huguenot, Isaac Hamon, Lieut-Col of the Queen's Regiment of Foot, and niece of Colonel Hector Hamon. They went on to have four more children:

- Isaac (1757–1823) a lieutenant with 60th Regiment of Foot, married Catherine Ormsby in 1788.
- Charlotte (1758–1810) socialite and close friend of Elizabeth Handcock (sister of Lord Castlemaine), and of Lady Caroline, wife of the Earl of Portarlington;
- Arthur (1764–1812) a captain with the Loyal Irish Fencible Infantry, who was killed at the Siege of Badajoz. He married Letitia Ormsby, widow of Samuel Davey, in 1787.
- Frederick (b.1767), married Sarah Hunt.

=== Death and burial ===
In Henry's will, proved 1769, he states that he had purchased a lieutenancy of foot for his son, William; an ensigncy for Robert, with money paid out for a lieutenancy of foot for him also; and £300 to set up his son, Charles, as a merchant in Dublin. The will, which was witnessed by Peter Hamon, William Burrell, and Edward Geoghegan, also bestowed an annuity of £30 on Hector Hamon (possibly brother of Deborah's father, Isaac, and father of Peter, the witness to the will). The house in Portarlington and a nearby farm at Westmeath were settled on his eldest son, Henry.

The seal on the Archdeacon's will was a swan rising, claiming a link to the Carys of Devon. His father's seal had the episcopal arms of Killala and three roses on a bend, also arms of the Devon Carys.

At the time of the Archdeacon's death, Henry, jnr, was 26, newly married to Anne Gore with a child of his own, and with the added responsibility of six younger siblings to care for, the youngest being only two years of age. The second eldest son, William, was already away in the army.

Cary is buried in the churchyard of French Church, Portarlington. His grave is nestled in the right angle of two low stone walls, directly behind the church. The headstone reads:

Sacred to the memory of the
Rev Archdeacon Henry
Cary who departed this life
the 27th of October 1769 in
the 52nd Year of his Age.
This stone is laid by his
afflicted Widow Deborah.

Deborah Hamon-Cary, the Archdeacon's widow, died in 1796.

=== Other family buried at French Church, Portarlington ===
Other headstones of some of the Archdeacon's descendants can also be seen in the churchyard of the French Church, Portarlington:

- daughter, Charlotte Cary d.1810 unmarried. The inscription of her death is included on the memorial stone of Elizabeth Handcock (d.1840) by Elizabeth's nephew, Lord Castlemaine;
- son, Captain Arthur Cary d. 1812 at Badajoz (who married Letitia Ormsby d.1844);
- great-grandson, Annesley Cary d.1851; and
- Great-great grandson, Henry Charles Cary d. 1957 & his wife Amy FitzMaurice d.1941.
