= Tobias Caulfield =

Anglican priest (1671-1735)

Tobias Caulfield (1671-1735) was an Anglican priest in Ireland during the 18th century.

Brocas was born in Galway and educated at Trinity College, Dublin. He was appointed a Prebendary of Achonry in 1696, and of Raphoe in 1716. Caulfield was Archdeacon of Killala from 1725 until his death a decade later.
