= John Archdall =

John Archdall may refer to:

- John Archdall (archdeacon of Killala), Irish Anglican priest, Archdeacon of Killala, 1636–1637, Archdeacon of Achonry, 1637–1638
- John Archdall (archdeacon of Ferns), Irish Anglican priest, Archdeacon of Ferns, 1875
