= Thomas Kingsbury =

Irish Anglican cleric

Thomas Kingsbury was an Anglican priest in Ireland during the 19th century.

Kingsbury was born in Dublin and educated at Trinity College there. A prebendary of Ballysadare in Achonry Cathedral, he was Archdeacon of Killala from 1818 until his death in 1846.
