= James Langrishe =

Irish Archdeacon

James Langrishe (c. 1765 – 17 May 1847) was Dean of Achonry from 1791 until 1806, when he became Archdeacon of Glendalough.

== Early life ==
Langrishe was the second son of Sir Hercules Langrishe, 1st Baronet of Knocktopher, and Hannah Myhill of County Kilkenny, Ireland. Hercules was an MP in the Parliament of Ireland and a noted supporter of Catholic Emancipation.

== Career ==
Langrishe served as rector of Newcastle Lyons, co. Dublin, and Killishin, County Carlow. He served as Dean of Achonry from 1791 until 1806, when he became Archdeacon of Glendalough.

== Personal life ==
He married Mary Harriet Michell, a daughter of Hugh Henry Mitchell and sister to Col. Hugh Henry Mitchell. Among their children were:

- Charles Tottenham Langrishe (named for the 1st Marquess of Ely, who married James' aunt Jane Myhill)
- Margaret Langrishe

Langrishe on 17 May 1847, aged 82. He was buried at St. Finian's Church, Newcastle, County Dublin.

Church of Ireland titles
Preceded by Richard Handcock	Dean of Achonry; 1791–1806	Succeeded by James Hastings
Preceded by James Hastings	Archdeacon of Glendalough; 1807–1847	Succeeded by Charles Strong
