= Archdeacon of Achonry =

Province of Armagh
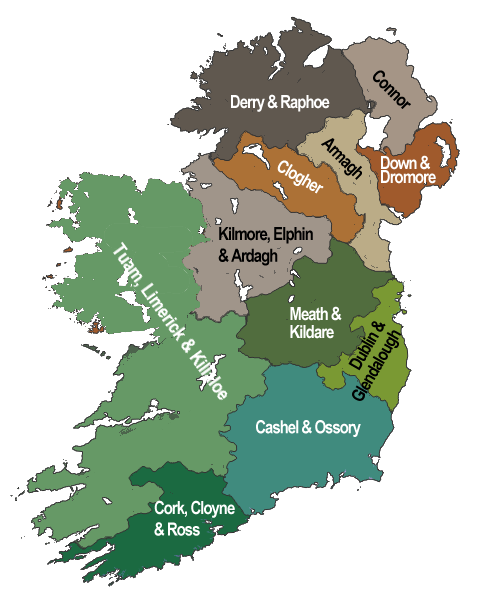
- Church: Church of Ireland
- Metropolitan bishop: Archbishop of Armagh
- Cathedral: St Patrick's Cathedral, Armagh
- Dioceses: 7

The Archdeacon of Achonry was a senior ecclesiastical officer within the Diocese of Achonry until 1622; Killala and Achonry from 1622 until 1834; and of Tuam, Killala and Achonry from 1834, although it has now been combined to include the area formerly served by the Archdeacon of Killala. As such, the holder of the role was responsible for the disciplinary supervision of the clergy within his portion of the diocese. within the diocese. The archdeaconry can trace its history back to Denis O'Miachain who in 1266 became bishop of the dioces to the last discrete incumbent George FitzHerbert McCormick.

== Notable archdeacons ==
- Denis O'Miachain
- Henry Sharpe
- John Archdall
- Edmund Rowlatt
- Henry Yeaden
- Thomas Walls
- Sankey Winter
- John Walls
- William Evelyn
- James Hutchinson
- Joseph Verschoyle was born in County Dublin and educated at Trinity College, Dublin. A nephew of Bishop James Verschoyle, he was Archdeacon of Achonry from 1813 until his death in 1862.
- Hamilton Townsend
- John Gore
- George Heather
- John Geddes
- Theophilus Landey
