= George Trulock =

Ireland priest

George Trulock was an Anglican priest in Ireland during the 19th-century.

Trulock was born in County Dublin and educated at Trinity College, Dublin. In 1827 he became a Prebendary of Lecan in Killala Cathedral; and in 1832 of Ballysadare in Achonry Cathedral. He was Archdeacon of Killala from his collation until his death on 25 September 1847.
