= Gordon Walker (priest) =

Irish priest (died 1916)

Thomas Gordon Walker was Dean of Achonry from 1907 until his death on 9 May 1916.

Allen was educated at Trinity College, Dublin. He spent his whole career at Emlaghfad. He was a Canon of Achonry from 1896 until 1907.

Church of Ireland titles
Preceded by George Abraham Heather	Dean of Achonry; 1907–1916	Succeeded by Thomas Allen
