= Alexander Murray (priest) =

Irish Anglican priest

Alexander Murray was an Anglican priest in Ireland during the 17th century.

Murray was educated at Trinity College Dublin. He was Dean of Killala from 1674 until his death in 1701.
