= Charles West Cope =

English painter and etcher (1811–1890)

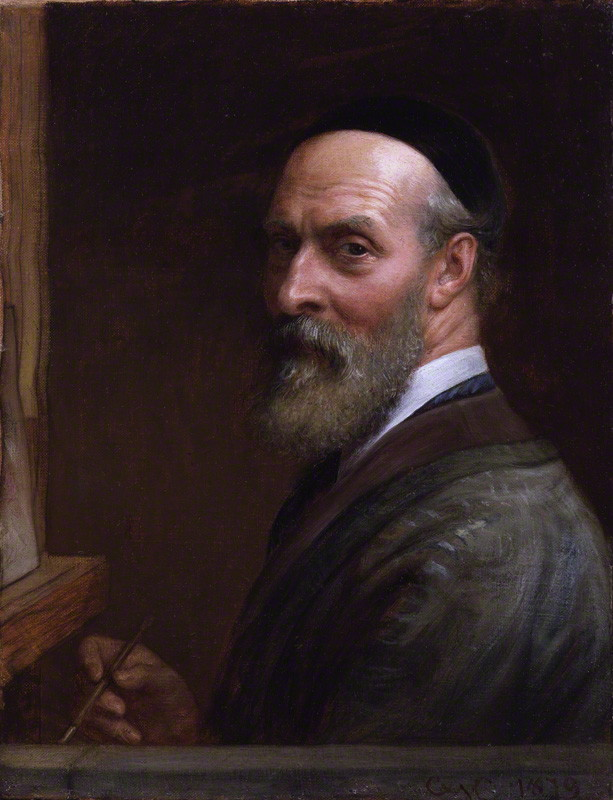
Charles West Cope, self-portrait from 1879

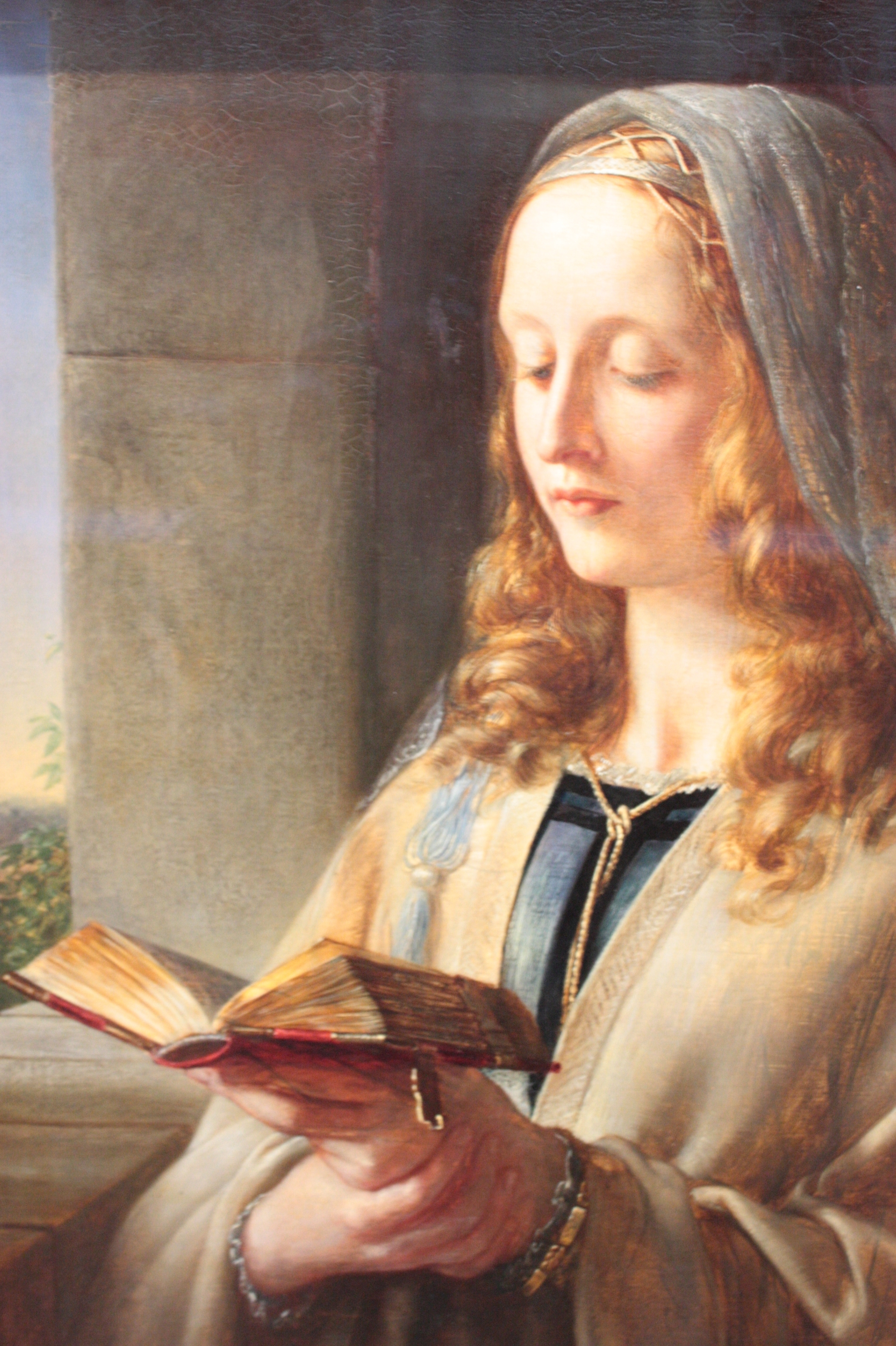
Maiden Meditation (1847)

Charles West Cope RA (28 July 1811– 21 August 1890) was an English, Victorian era painter of genre and history scenes, and an etcher. He was responsible for painting several frescos in the House of Lords in London.

== Life and work ==
=== Early life and training ===
Cope was born at Park Square in Leeds, the son of Charles Cope, a watercolour landscape painter and art teacher. He was given the name 'West' after that of a celebrated painter, Benjamin West, and his only sister Ellen, given the middle-name 'Turner', after J. M. W. Turner – both painters being friends of his father. His mother was "a gifted amateur" artist in watercolours who died shortly after Charles' birth.

Charles was sent as a child to a boarding school in Camberwell, London, and afterwards to "Terry's school" (sic) at Great Marlow, where he was bullied and his elbow broken, which left him with a crooked arm for life. He then went to Leeds Grammar School, where he suffered from the attentions of a cruel teacher.

In 1827, Cope's father was killed in a stage coach accident. That same year he entered Sass's Academy in Bloomsbury, London, and in 1828 became a student of the Royal Academy. He earned a silver medal from the Society of Arts in 1829, a second medal in the Royal Academy Life School, and therefore a life studentship. While at Sass's he established life-long friendship with Francis Cary and Charles Stonhouse. About 1830 he lived at lodgings in Great Russell Street, Bloomsbury close to the British Museum.

In 1832 Cope went to Paris and practiced his art by copying Old Masters at the Louvre such as Titian, Rembrandt and others. In 1833 he exhibited at the Royal Academy for the first time – a picture called The Golden Age. In September of the same year he travelled to Italy, where he spent two years – earning a living for part of the time by painting pictures on commission. His painting The Firstborn was completed in Florence and exhibited at the British Institution.

=== Early career ===
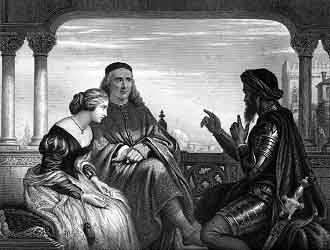
Othello Relating His Adventures (etching, 1853), from The Works of Shakespere

After returning to England, Cope took lodgings in Newman Street, London, then moved to 1 Russell Place, where his landlord and family became his artist's models. Here he painted Paolo and Franceses and Osteria di Campagna, which were exhibited at the Royal Academy in 1837 and 1838 respectively, and sold shortly thereafter for a considerable sum. In 1839–40 he painted a large altar-piece (16 feet by 10) for St George's Church, Leeds, which was exhibited at the Royal Academy in 1840.

Cope founded an artists' society called 'The Etching Club' which included artists such as William Holman Hunt, Richard Redgrave and Samuel Palmer. The club published several books of etchings illustrating various themes by well-known authors such as Goldsmith's The Deserted Village, Sonnets by Shakespeare and Milton's "L'Allegro" and "Il ponseroso".

On 1 September 1840, Cope married Charlotte Benning, the daughter of a surgeon with a large country practice. They lived first in rented furnished lodgings in Lisson Grove, London, then moved to a house in Kensington (which Cope himself had commissioned) in 1841. In that same year his painting Poor Law Guardians: Board-day application for bread was exhibited at the Royal Academy.

=== Painting frescos for the Houses of Parliament ===
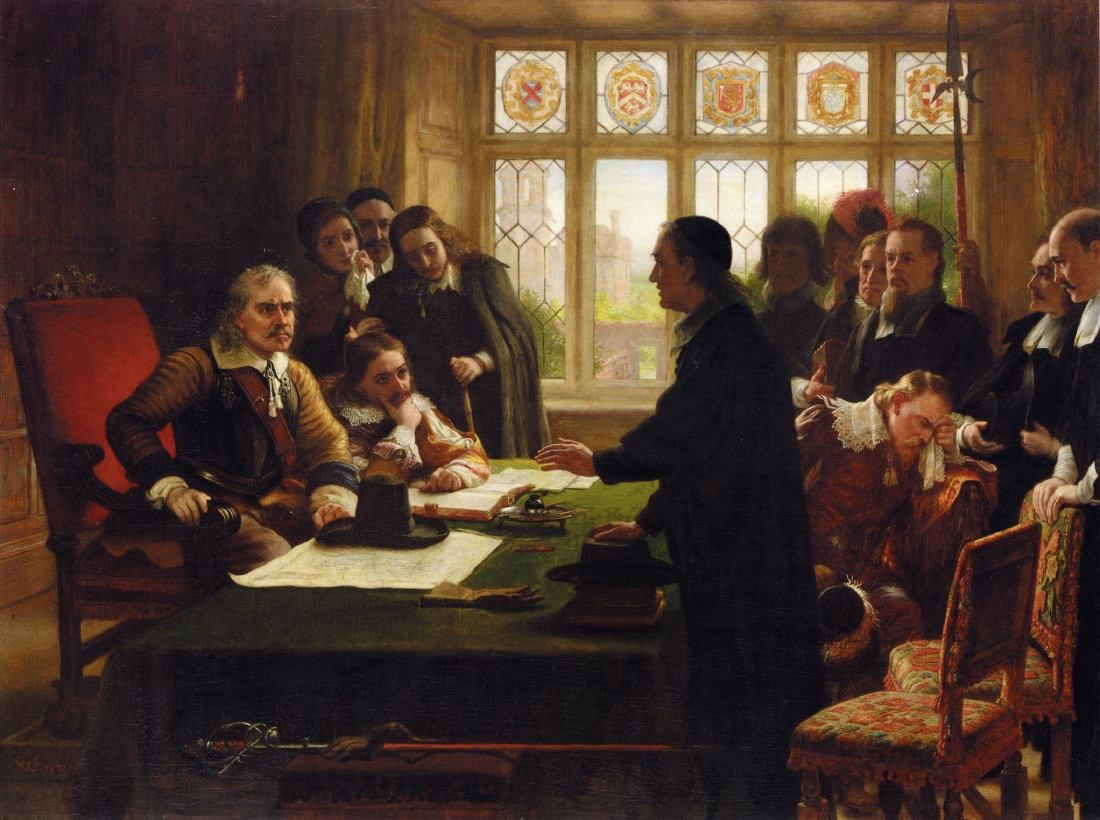
Oliver Cromwell and His Secretary John Milton, Receiving a Deputation Seeking Aid for the Swiss Protestants (1872)

Cope submitted designs for a competition to decorate the interior of the Houses of Parliament. In 1843, his drawing The First Trial by Jury earned him a prize of 300 pounds. In 1844 he submitted a further design called 'Meeting of Jacob and Rachel,' and was one of the six painters commissioned in July of that year to prepare preliminary drawings, coloured sketches, and specimens of fresco painting for the decoration of the House of Lords. He also received 400 pounds for his design of Prince Henry Acknowledging the Authority of Judge Gascoigne. Cope received a commission to execute this design in fresco, and also another of Edward the Black Prince receiving the Order of the Garter. These commissions, and others, engaged Cope in fresco painting in the House of Lords for several years. He was also elected an associate of the Royal Academy (ARA) in 1843.

In 1848 he became a Royal Academician (RA) after exhibiting a large work Cardinal Wolsey's Reception at Leicester Abbey. In this year he was engaged on the frescos of Griselda and Lara on the wall of the upper waiting hall of the House of Lords. In 1849 he exhibited a painting The First-born which was subsequently engraved for the Art Union of London. In that year he travelled to Italy and Germany to improve his knowledge and technique of fresco painting. He visited Peter von Hess in Munich, who was working on a fresco in the Basilica of St. Boniface

In 1850, Cope showed King Lear and Cordelia at the RA, and, in 1851, The Sisters, and Laurence Saunders's Martyrdom. In 1852, he painted the Marriage of Griselda and in 1853, Othello relating his Adventures to Dessdemona. In the same year he became seriously ill with an internal tumour. In 1854 he exhibited 'The Friends', and in 1855 Royal Prisoners. In 1856 he painted The Embarkation of a Puritan Family for New England for the peers' corridor in the House of Lords, for which a fresco was afterwards substituted. The main painting was sent to America, and Cope was made an honorary member of the Philadelphian Society of Arts.

In 1857 Cope exhibited Affronted and executed a fresco of The Burial of Charles I in the peers' corridor (House of Lords). In 1858 came The Stepping Stones, and in 1859 a picture of Cordelia receiving the News of her father's Ill-treatment, and the fresco of The Parting of Lord and Lady William Russell in the peers' corridor.

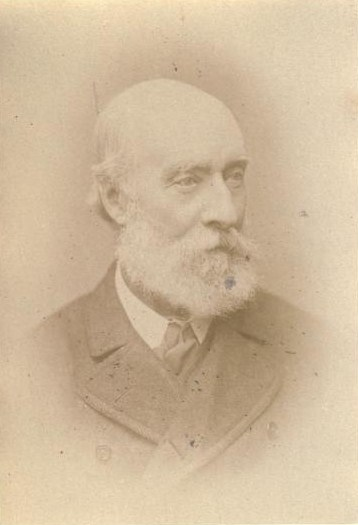
Photograph of Charles West Cope

In 1861 the fresco of Raising the Standard was placed in the peers' corridor. In 1862 he painted (using the "water-glass method") the fresco of The Defence of Basing House, and in 1863–64 that of the Expulsion of Fellows from Oxford for refusing to sign the Covenant. In 1865 he exhibited a study of Fra Angelico in oil, afterwards executed in mosaic on a larger scale at the South Kensington Museum. In the year his large posthumous portrait of Prince Albert was hung in the large room of the Society of Arts.

In 1865 and 1866 Cope finished his best frescoes in the House of Lords – Meeting of Train Bands to relieve the Siege of Gloucester and Speaker Lenthall asserting the Privileges of the Commons. In 1867 he was appointed professor of painting at the Royal Academy, and delivered six lectures a year till 1875. In 1867 also he painted a third scene (moonlight) from Othello (exhibited 1868). Cope's wife, Charlotte, died in 1868.

=== Final years ===
Cope continued to exhibit at the Royal Academy until 1882, his most important painting of that period being The Council of the Royal Academy selecting Pictures for the Exhibition, shown in 1876. In that same year he went to America as one of the representatives of the RA at the centennial exhibition in Philadelphia.

In 1879 Cope married his second wife Eleanor Smart. They settled at Maidenhead in Berkshire (on the Thames). In 1883 he retired as a professional artist though he continued to paint for his own enjoyment and also took up boating and cycling. He wrote his autobiography, Reminiscences, which was completed in October 1889.

Cope died in Bournemouth in 1890 after a brief illness. He has a memorial tablet in St Mary Abbots church in Kensington, London. The artist's son from his first marriage, Arthur Stockdale Cope RA (1857–1940), became a well-known and successful portrait painter.

=== Works ===
There is a full date-order catalogue of Cope's works, which stretch over 50 years from 1832–1882, in Appendix II (p. 375 ff.) of his "Reminiscences" (see "further reading").

=== Gallery ===
The Village Schoolmaster, 1842

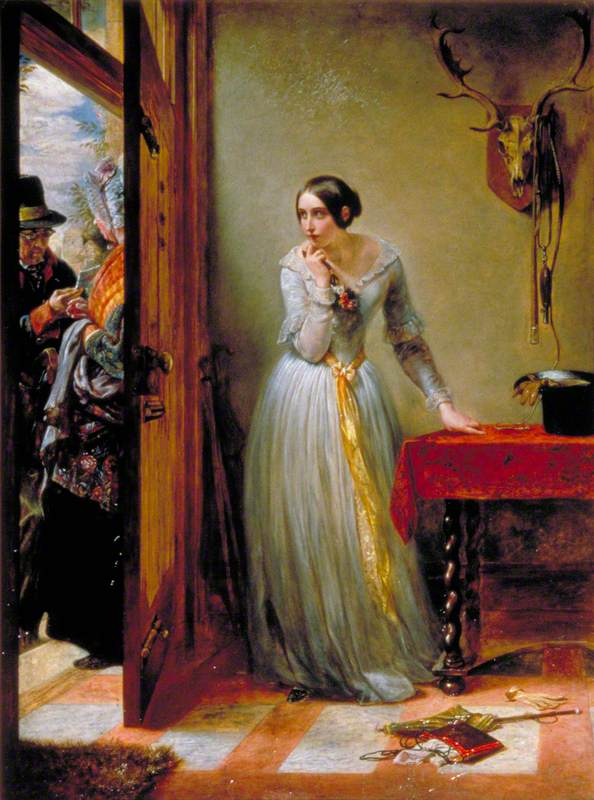
Palpitation, 1844

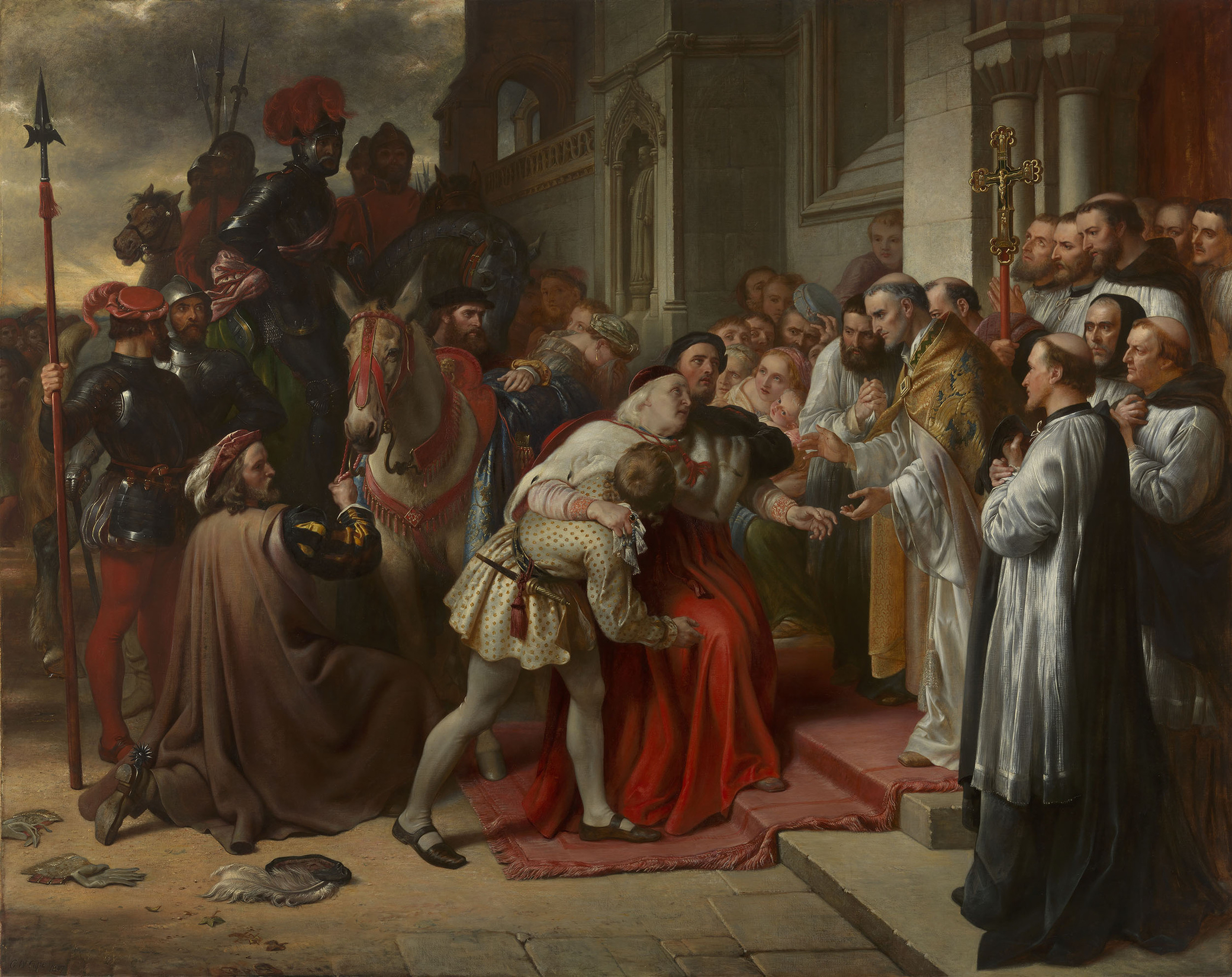
Cardinal Wolsey at the Gate of Leicester Abbey, 1847

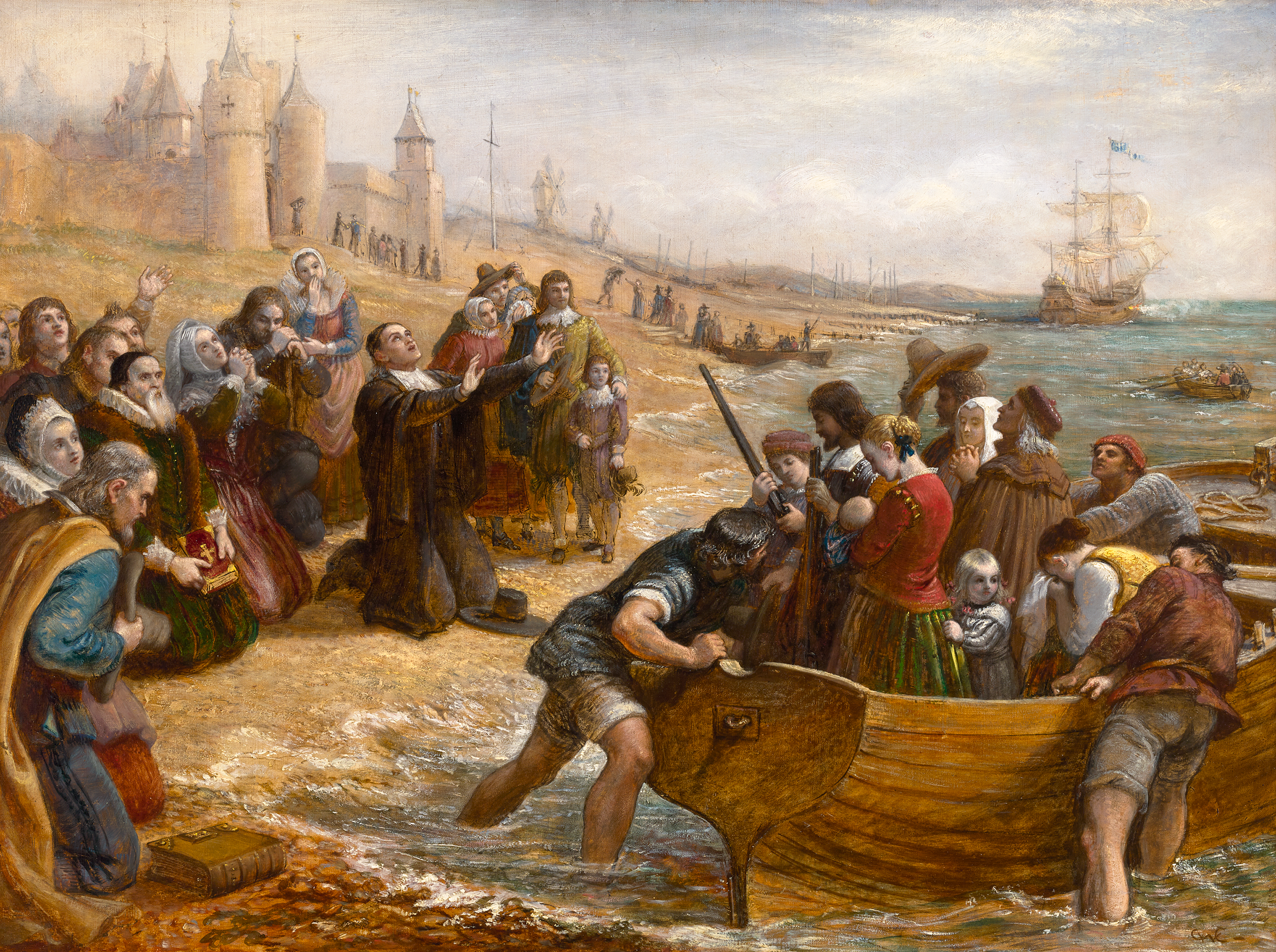
The Pilgrim Fathers Oil study. c.1856

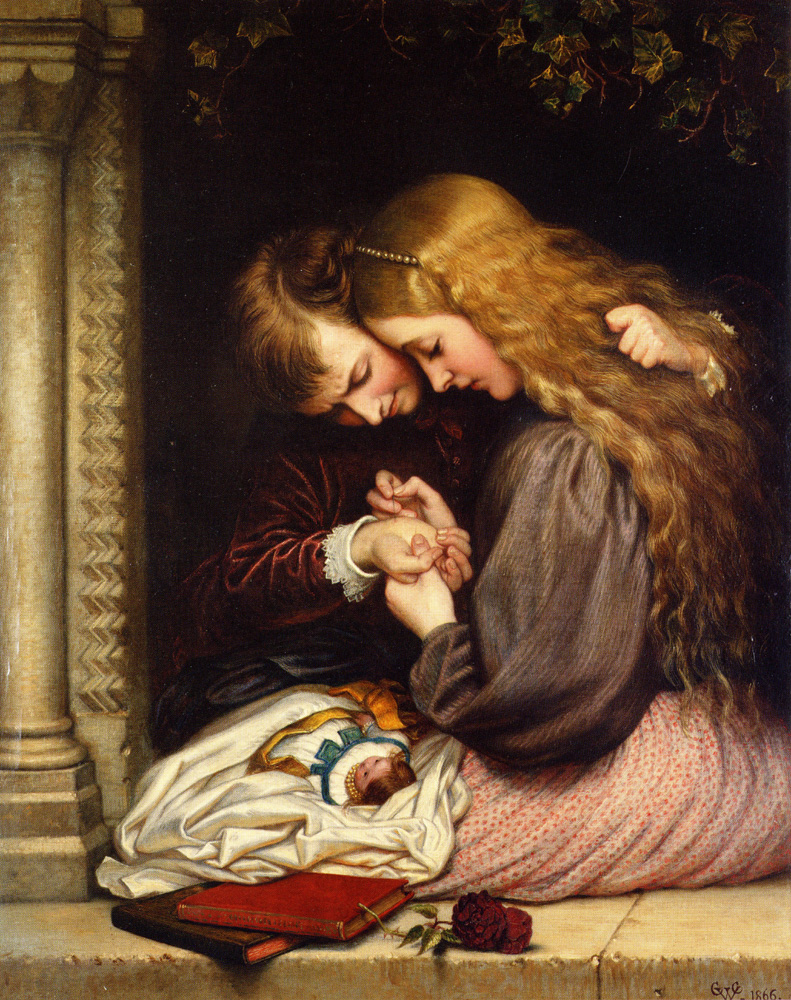
The Thorn, 1866

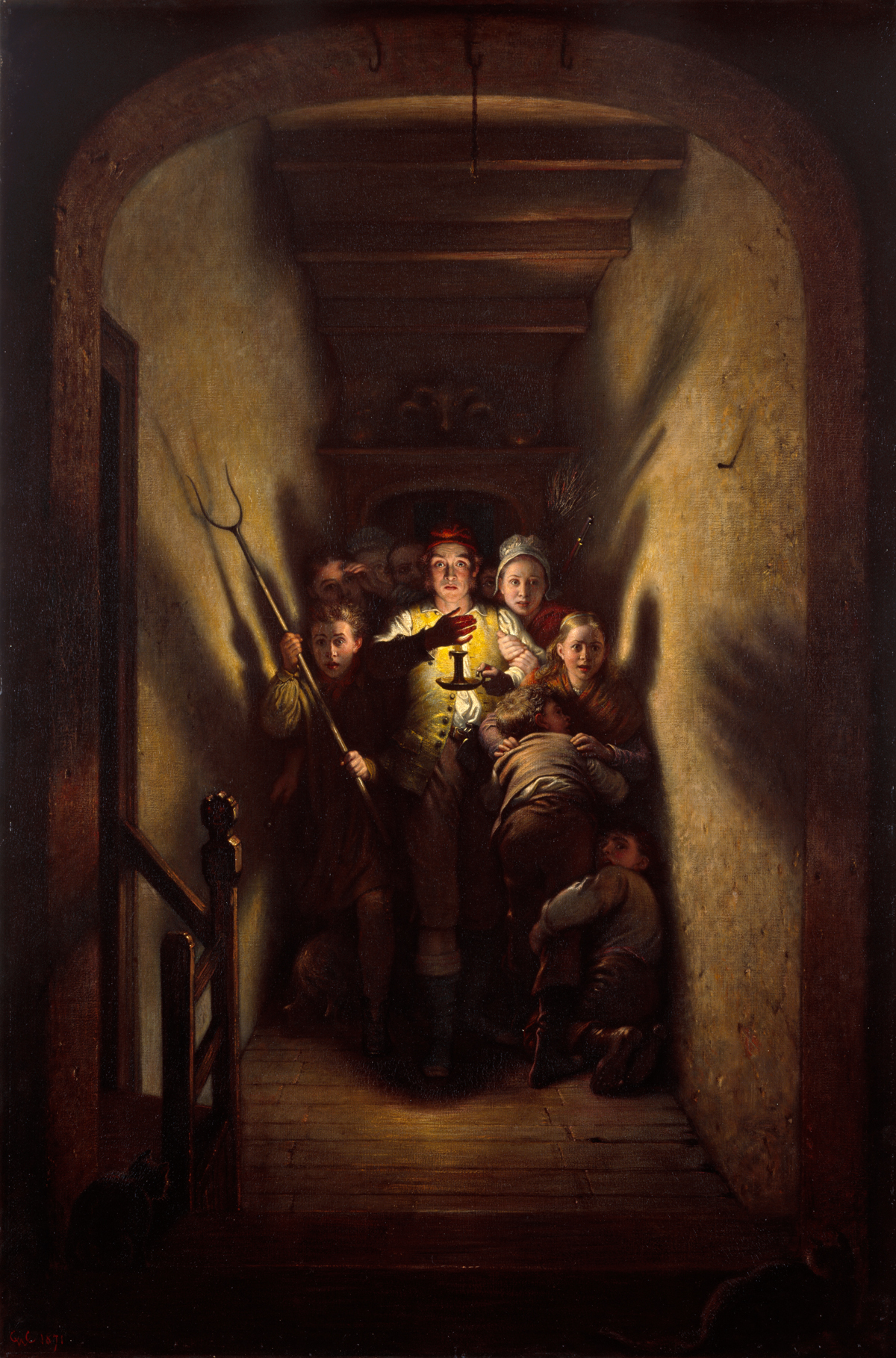
A Night Alarm: The Advance!, 1871

Taming of the Shrew, 1874

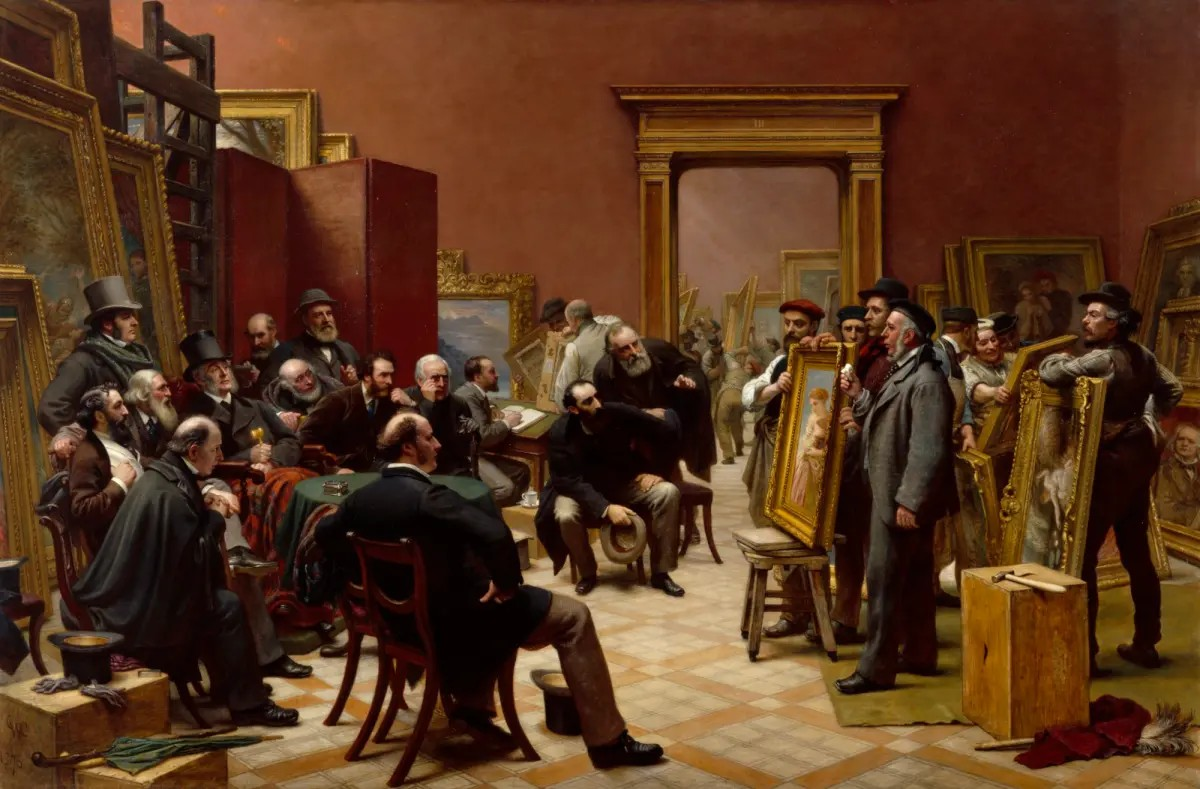
The Council of the Royal Academy Selecting Pictures for the Exhibition, 1876

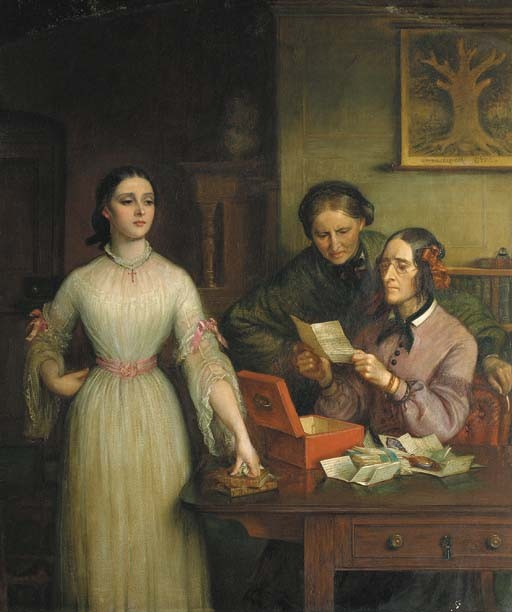
The Inquisition, 1880
