= Jasper Pheasant =

Jasper Pheasant was an Anglican priest in Ireland in the seventeenth century.

Pheasant was educated at Trinity College, Dublin. He was ordained deacon on 1 March 1640 and priest on 18 June 1680. He was Precentor of Achonry from 1661 and Dean of Killaloe from 1662, holding both positions until his death in 1692.
