= Sankey Winter =

Irish Anglican priest (1688–1736)

Sankey Winter (1688–1736) was an Anglican priest in Ireland.

Ledwich was born in County Kildare and educated at Trinity College, Dublin. Winter was Archdeacon of Achonry from 1712 to 1719 and Archdeacon of Killala from 1719 to 1724. He was installed as Prebendary of Donadea and Archdeacon of Kildare on 11 May 1724; and Dean of Kildare on 8 October 1725, holding all three positions until his death.
