= Weldon Ashe =

Weldon Ashe (1826–1874) was an Anglican priest in Ireland during the 19th-century.

Ashe was educated at Trinity College, Dublin. He was the incumbent at Ballina, County Mayo; and Archdeacon of Killala from 1871 until his death.
