= Dean of Achonry =

Church of Ireland official

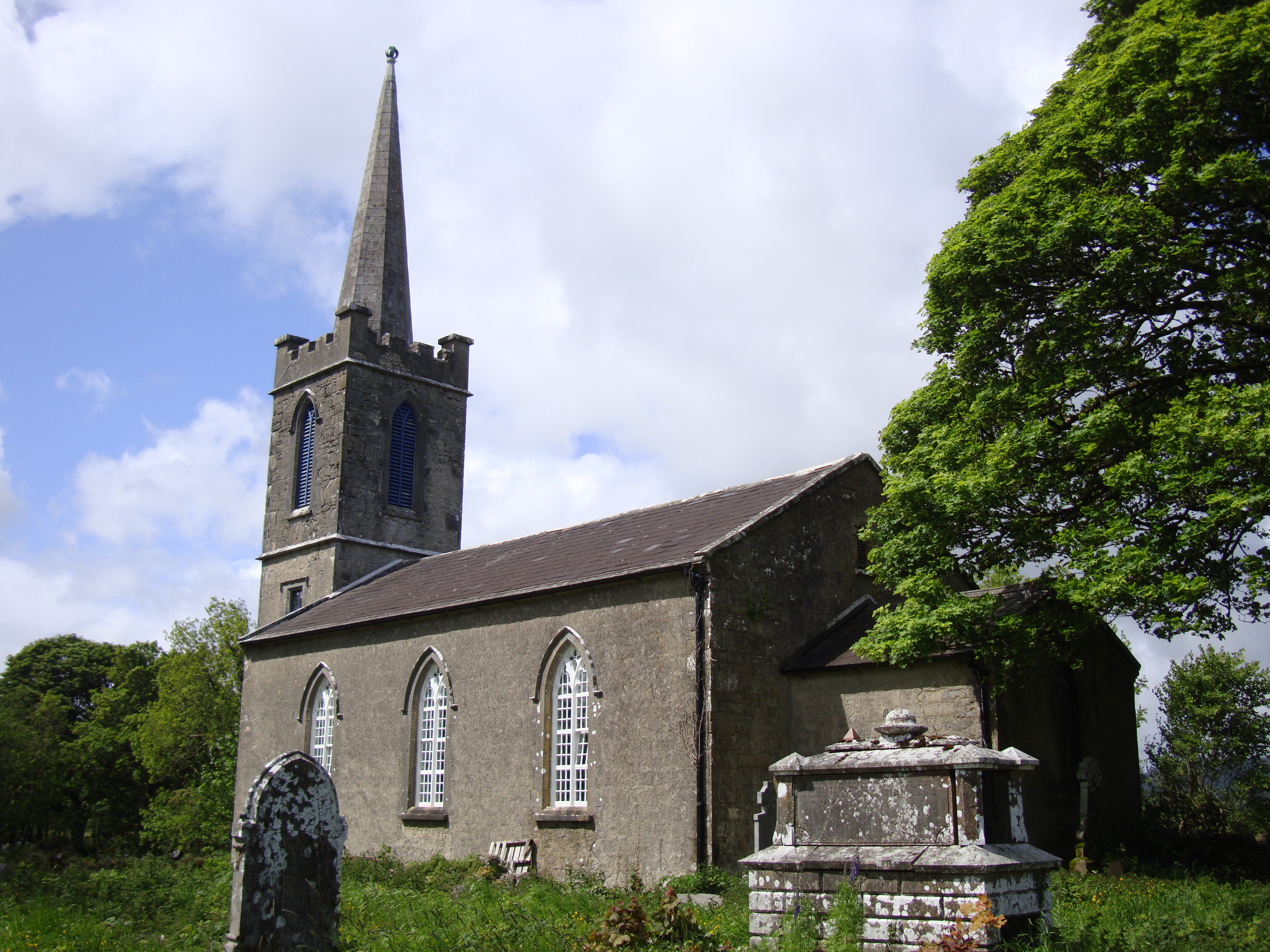
Former Achonry Cathedral

The Dean of Achonry used to be based at the Cathedral Church of St Crumnathy, Achonry (closed in 1997) in the Diocese of Achonry within the united bishopric of Tuam, Killala and Achonry of the Church of Ireland.

== List of deans of Achonry ==
- 1582–1591: Owen O'Connor (afterwards Bishop of Killala, 1591)
- 1615 William Flanagan (also Dean of Killala, 1613)
- 1628/9 William Buchanan (also Dean of Killala and afterwards Dean of Tuam, 1661)
- 1661 Ralph Hollingworth
- 1662 James Vaughan
- 1683 William Lloyd (afterwards Bishop of Killala and Achonry, 1691)
- 1691–1694 Samuel Foley (afterwards Bishop of Down and Connor, 1694)
- 1694/5–1733 John Yeard
- 1733–1751 Sutton Symes
- 1752–1791 Richard Handcock
- 1791–1806 James Langrishe
- 1806–1812 James Hastings
- 1812–1821 Arthur Henry Kenney
- 1821–1824 William Greene
- 1824–1839 Theophilus Blakely (afterwards Dean of Down, 1839)
- 1839–1850 Edward Newenham Hoare (afterwards Dean of Waterford, 1850)
- 1850–1872 Hervey de Montmorency, 4th Viscount Mountmorres
- 1872-1882 Arthur Moore
- 1886-1895 Hamilton Townsend
- 1895–1907 George Abraham Heather
- 1907–1914 Thomas Gordon Walker
- 1916–1927 Thomas Allen
