= William Sheridan (bishop of Kilmore and Ardagh) =

Irish clergyman

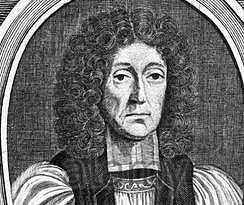
William Sheridan (Bishop of Kilmore and Ardagh) 1682-1691

William Sheridan (c. 1635 – 3 October 1711) was a 17th-century Irish clergyman, who was Bishop of Kilmore and Ardagh between 1682 and 1691, having previously served as Dean of Down from 1669 to 1682.

Sheridan was born at Togher, County Cavan, the son of Dionysius (or Dennis) Sheridan, a former Catholic priest who had converted to Protestantism. His godfather was William Bedell, Protestant Bishop of Kilmore. Sheridan's siblings included Patrick Sheridan, Cloyne, Protestant Bishop of Cloyne (1679-1682) and Sir Thomas Sheridan (politician), Chief Secretary of State for Ireland (1687-1688). William Sheridan graduated from Trinity College, Dublin, and became chaplain to Sir Maurice Eustace, Lord Chancellor of Ireland. After Eustace's death in 1665, he became chaplain to James Butler, 1st Duke of Ormonde.

Sheridan married Mary O'Reilly, and they had one son, Donald Sheridan. His nephew, Thomas Sheridan, was the grandfather of the dramatist and politician Richard Brinsley Sheridan. William Sheridan was consecrated Bishop of Kilmore on 19 February 1682. In 1691, like other members of the Non-juring schism, he was deprived of this see for refusing to take an oath of allegiance to William and Mary following the 1688 coup d'etat. He left Ireland and spent the rest of his life, living in reduced circumstances, in London. He is buried at Fulham.

An engraving of Sheridan by William Sherwin is held by the National Library of Ireland.

Church of England titles
Preceded by Daniel Witter	Dean of Down; 1669–1682	Succeeded by Benjamin Phipps
Preceded by Francis Marsh	Bishop of Kilmore and Ardagh; 1682–1691	Succeeded by See vacant
