= Rowlatt =

Rowlatt is a surname. Notable people with the surname include:

- Edmund Rowlatt (1633–1693), British Anglican priest
- John Rowlatt (1898–1956), British lawyer
- Justin Rowlatt (born 1966), British journalist and television presenter
- Kathy Rowlatt (born 1948), British diver
- Sidney Rowlatt (1862–1945), English lawyer and judge
  - Rowlatt Act
  - Rowlatt Committee
