= William Colvin =

William Colvin may refer to:

- Bill Colvin (1934–2010), Canadian ice hockey player
- William Colvin (priest) (1858–1949), Anglican priest in Ireland
