= John Brocas =

18th-century Anglican priest in Ireland

John Brocas (1741-1795) was an Anglican priest in Ireland during the 18th century.

Brocas was born in County Dublin; and educated at Trinity College, Dublin. He was Dean of Killala from 1741 until his death.
