= John Yeard =

Irish Anglican priest (died 1733)

John Yeard, D.D. was Dean of Achonry from 1695 until his death in 1733. He was also Chaplain to Lord Lifford's Regiment of Foot.
