= Thomas Bayly (bishop) =

Irish Anglican bishop

Thomas Bayly (died 20 July 1670) was a seventeenth century Anglican bishop in Ireland.

Bayly, a native of Rutland was educated at the University of Oxford (he was awarded an Oxford Master of Arts {MA Oxon} and a Doctor of Divinity {DD}), and became Chaplain to Augustine Lindsell, Bishop of Peterborough, until his appointment as Dean of Down (1661–1663).Cotton, Henry. He was Archdeacon of Dromore from 1663 to 1664. He was consecrated Bishop of Killala and Achonry on 5 June 1664 and died in post on 20 July 1670

== Bibliography ==
- Cotton, Henry (1849). Fasti ecclesiæ Hibernicæ : the succession of the prelates and members of the cathedral bodies in Ireland. Vol. 3 The Province of Ulster. Hodges and Smith. OCLC 316423149.
- Cotton, Henry (1850). Fasti ecclesiæ Hibernicæ : the succession of the prelates and members of the cathedral bodies in Ireland. Vol. 4 The Province of Connaught. Hodges and Smith. OCLC 606224828.
- Fryde, E.B.; Greenway, D.E.; Porter, S.; Roy, I. (1986). "Handbook of British chronology". Offices of the Royal Historical Society : University College. OCLC 989682481.
- Moody, Theodore William; Martin, Francis Xavier; Byrne, Francis John (1984). A new history of Ireland. Companion to Irish History. Vol. IX. Clarendon press. ISBN 0-19-821745-5. OCLC 489576192.
- Wood, Anthony A.; Bliss, Philip (1820). Athenae Oxonienses: An Exact History of All the Writers and Bishops who Have Had Their Education in the University of Oxford : to which are Added the Fasti Or Annals of the Said University. Athenae Oxonienses: An Exact History of All the Writers and Bishops who Have Had Their Education in the University of Oxford : to which are Added the Fasti Or Annals of the Said University. Vol. 4 (3rd with additions ed.). Rivington.

Church of Ireland titles
Preceded by William Coote	Dean of Down; 1661–1663	Succeeded by Daniel Witter
Preceded by Henry Hall	Bishop of Killala and Achonry; 1664–1670	Succeeded by Thomas Otway
