= James Hastings (disambiguation) =

James Hastings may be:

- James Hastings (1852-1922), Scottish biblical scholar
- James F. Hastings (1926-2014), Congressman from New York
- James Hastings (priest) (fl. 1806-1812), Dean of Achonry, Irish Anglican priest
- Jimmy Hastings, (1938-2024), British musician
