= Theophilus Brocas =

Irish Anglican cleric

Theophilus Brocas, D.D. (1705–1770) was an Anglican priest in Ireland during the Eighteenth century.

Brocas was born in Dublin and educated at Trinity College, Dublin. He was appointed Prebendary of Kilteskill in Clonfert Cathedral in 1734, and of Island Eddy at Kilmacduagh the same year. Brocas was Archdeacon of Killala from 1736 until 1741; and Dean of Killala from then until his death. He was also the incumbent at Ringsend.

His grandson was Henry Francis Cary.
