= Thomas Otway (bishop) =

Irish Anglican bishop

Thomas Otway (1615 – 6 March 1692) was an Anglican bishop in Ireland.

Otway was born in Wiltshire. He was educated at Sedbergh School and later consecrated Bishop of Killala and Achonry on 29 January 1671. He was translated to Ossory on 7 February 1680. From 1680 until 1691 he was also Archdeacon of Armagh in commendam. He attended the short-lived Patriot Parliament summoned by James II of England in 1689. He died on 6 March 1692 in Kilkenny.

Church of Ireland titles
Preceded by Thomas Bayly	Bishop of Killala and Achonry; 1671–1680	Succeeded by John Smith
Preceded by Michael Ward	Archdeacon of Armagh; 1680–1691	Succeeded by Edmund Arwaker
Preceded by Michael Ward	Bishop of Ossory; 1680–1693	Succeeded by John Hartstonge
