= John Gustavus Handcock =

Irish politician

John Gustavus Handcock (1720 – 26 February 1766) was an Irish politician.

He was the sixth son of William Handcock and his wife Susan Warburton, daughter of Richard Warburton. His younger brother was William Handcock and his cousins were William Handcock, 1st Viscount Castlemaine and Richard Handcock, 2nd Baron Castlemaine. In 1761, Handcock entered the Irish House of Commons, representing Ballyshannon until his death in 1766.

On 6 August 1755, he married Margaret Caroline Wilson. Their marriage was childless.

Parliament of Ireland
Preceded by Michael Clark; Thomas Conolly	Member of Parliament for Ballyswanging; 1761–1766; With: Michael Clarke	Succeeded by Michael Clarke; Hugh Henry Mitchell
