= John Archdall (archdeacon of Killala) =

John Archdall was an Irish Anglican priest.

Archdall was born in County Fermanagh and educated at Trinity College, Dublin. He was Archdeacon of Killala from 1636 to 1637; and then of Achonry from 1637 to 1638.
