= Henry Yeaden =

Henry Yeaden was an Irish Anglican priest.

Yeaden was born in County Roscommon and educated at Trinity College, Dublin. He was Archdeacon of Achonry from 1693 to 1705.
