= Henry Francis Cary =

British author and translator

Henry Cary
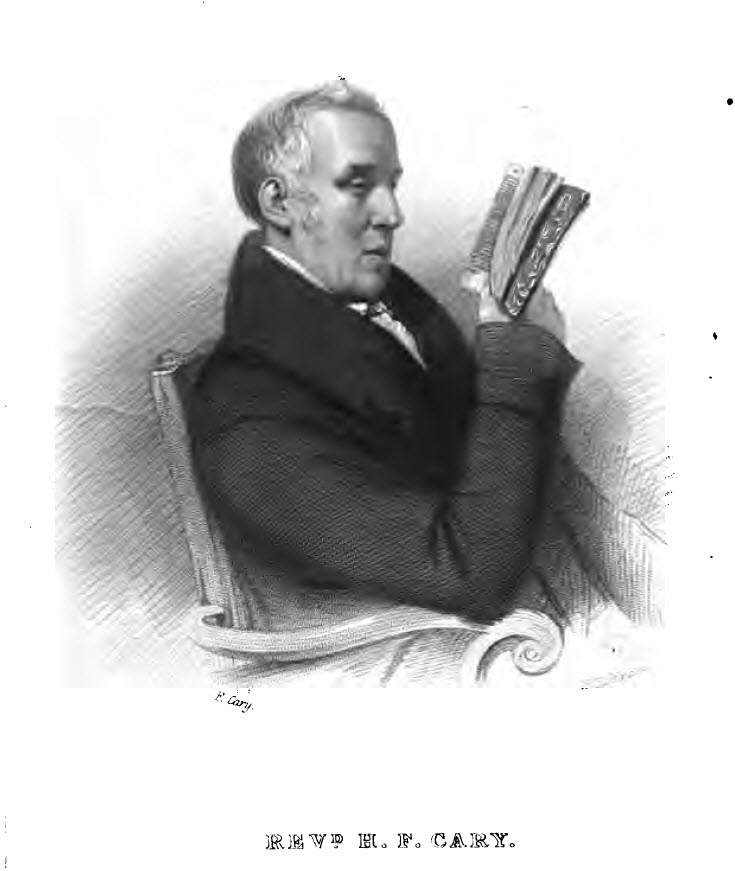
- Portrait by his son, Francis Stephen Cary
- Born: 6 December 1772; Gibraltar
- Died: 14 August 1844; Bloomsbury
- Resting place: Westminster Abbey
- Education: in Uxbridge, then Rugby School, then Sutton Coldfield Grammar School, then Birmingham Grammar School
- Alma mater: Christ Church, Oxford
- Occupations: Poet, clergyman, translator, and librarian
- Employer: British Museum
- Known for: His blank verse translation of The Divine Comedy of Dante
- Spouse: Jane Ormsby (1773–1832)
- Children: William Lucius Cary (1797–1869); Jane Sophia Cary (1799–1816); Henrietta Cary (1801–1807); James Walter Cary (1802–1879); Henry Cary (1804–1870); Charles Thomas Cary (1806–1881); Francis Stephen Cary (1808–1880); John Cary (1813–1813); Richard Cary (1817–1845)

The Reverend Henry Francis Cary (6 December 1772 – 14 August 1844) was a British author and translator, best known for his blank verse translation of The Divine Comedy of Dante.

== Biography ==
Henry Francis Cary was born in Gibraltar, on 6 December 1772. He was the eldest son of Henrietta Brocas and William Cary. Henrietta was the daughter of Theophilus Brocas, Dean of Killala and William, at the time, was a captain of the First Regiment of Foot. His grandfather, Henry Cary was archdeacon, and his great grandfather, Mordecai Cary, bishop of that diocese.

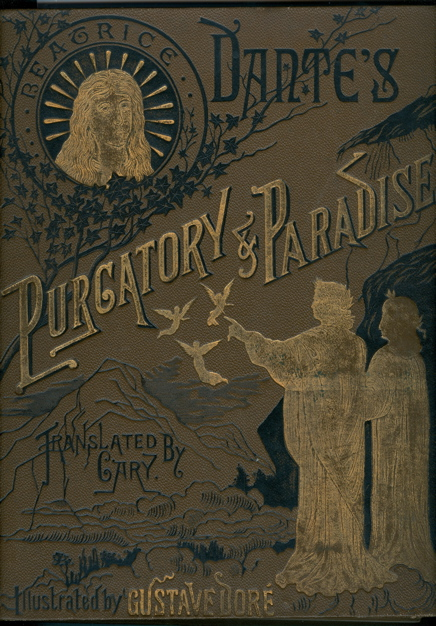
The Dante translation with Gustave Doré illustrations

He was educated at Rugby School and at the grammar schools of Sutton Coldfield and Birmingham, as well as at Christ Church, Oxford, which he entered in 1790 and studied French and Italian literature. While at school he regularly contributed to the Gentleman's Magazine, and published a volume of Sonnets and Odes. He took holy orders and in 1797 and became vicar of Abbots Bromley in Staffordshire. He held this benefice until his death. In 1800 he also became vicar of Kingsbury in Warwickshire.

At Christ Church he studied French and Italian literature, his command of which is evidenced in his notes to his translation of Dante. The version of the Inferno was published in 1805 together with the original text.

Cary moved to London in 1808, where he became reader at the Berkeley Chapel and subsequently, lecturer at Chiswick and curate of the Savoy Chapel. His version of the whole Divina Commedia in blank verse appeared in 1814. It was published at Cary's own expense, the publisher refusing to undertake the risk, since the publication of the Inferno in 1805 had been a failure.

The translation was brought to the notice of Samuel Rogers by Thomas Moore. Rogers made some additions to an article on it by Ugo Foscolo in the Edinburgh Review. This article, and praise bestowed on the work by Coleridge in a lecture at the Royal Institution, led to a general acknowledgment of its merit. Cary's Dante gradually took its place among standard works, passing through four editions in his lifetime.

In 1826, he was appointed assistant-librarian at the reading room of the British Museum, a post he held for about eleven years.

In 1833, Cary was granted six months' leave of absence because of illness and travelled with his manservant and his son, Francis, to Italy visiting Amiens, Paris, Lyons, Aix, Nice, Mentone, Genoa, Pisa, Florence, Sienna, Rome (a month), Naples, Bologna, Verona, Venice (a month), Innsbruck, Munich, Nuremberg, Frankfurt, Cologne, Rotterdam, The Hague, Amsterdam, Brussels, Ghent, and Bruges.

His friend Charles Lamb was a regular visitor at his workplace. On 10 May 1834, Lamb wrote,

… once a month I pass a day, a gleam in my life, with Cary at the museum. (He is the flower of Clergymen).

In 1824, Cary published a translation of The Birds of Aristophanes, and, about 1834, he published his translation of the Odes of Pindar. He resigned from the museum because the appointment of keeper of the printed books, which should have been his in the ordinary course of promotion, was refused to him when it fell vacant. In 1841 a crown pension of £200 a year, obtained through the efforts of Samuel Rogers, was conferred on him.

Cary's Lives of the early French Poets, and Lives of English Poets (from Samuel Johnson to Henry Kirke White), intended as a continuation of Johnson's Lives of the Poets, were published in collected form in 1846. He died in Charlotte St., St. George's, Bloomsbury, London, in 1844 and was buried in Poets' Corner, Westminster Abbey.

A memoir was published by his son, Judge Henry Cary, in 1847. Another son, Francis Stephen Cary, became a well-known art teacher, succeeding Henry Sass as the head of his art academy in London.

== See also ==
- English translations of Homer: Henry Francis Cary
- List of Gibraltarians
