= Henry Sharpe (priest) =

Anglican priest

Henry Sharpe was an Anglican priest in Ireland in the first third of the 17th-century.

Sharpe was ordained in 1623; appointed Archdeacon of Dromore on 21 June 1625; Archdeacon of Achonry on 28 September 1625; and prebendary of Ballintubber in Elphin Cathedral in 1628.
