= William Skipton =

19th century Priest in Ireland

William Skipton (5 November 1831 – 20 April 1903) was an Anglican priest in Ireland during the second half of the 19th century and the first decade of the 20th.

Skipton was born in County Londonderry and educated at Trinity College, Dublin. He was ordained in 1856; and was Dean of Killala from 1885 until his death.
