= William Evelyn (Archdeacon of Achonry) =

William Evelyn was an Irish Anglican priest in the 17th century.

Evelyn was educated at Trinity College, Dublin. He was Archdeacon of Achonry from 1755 to 1760. He died in 1770.
