= Mordecai Cary =

Irish Anglican bishop (1687-1751)

The Right Reverend Mordecai Cary
- Bishop of Killala and Achonry
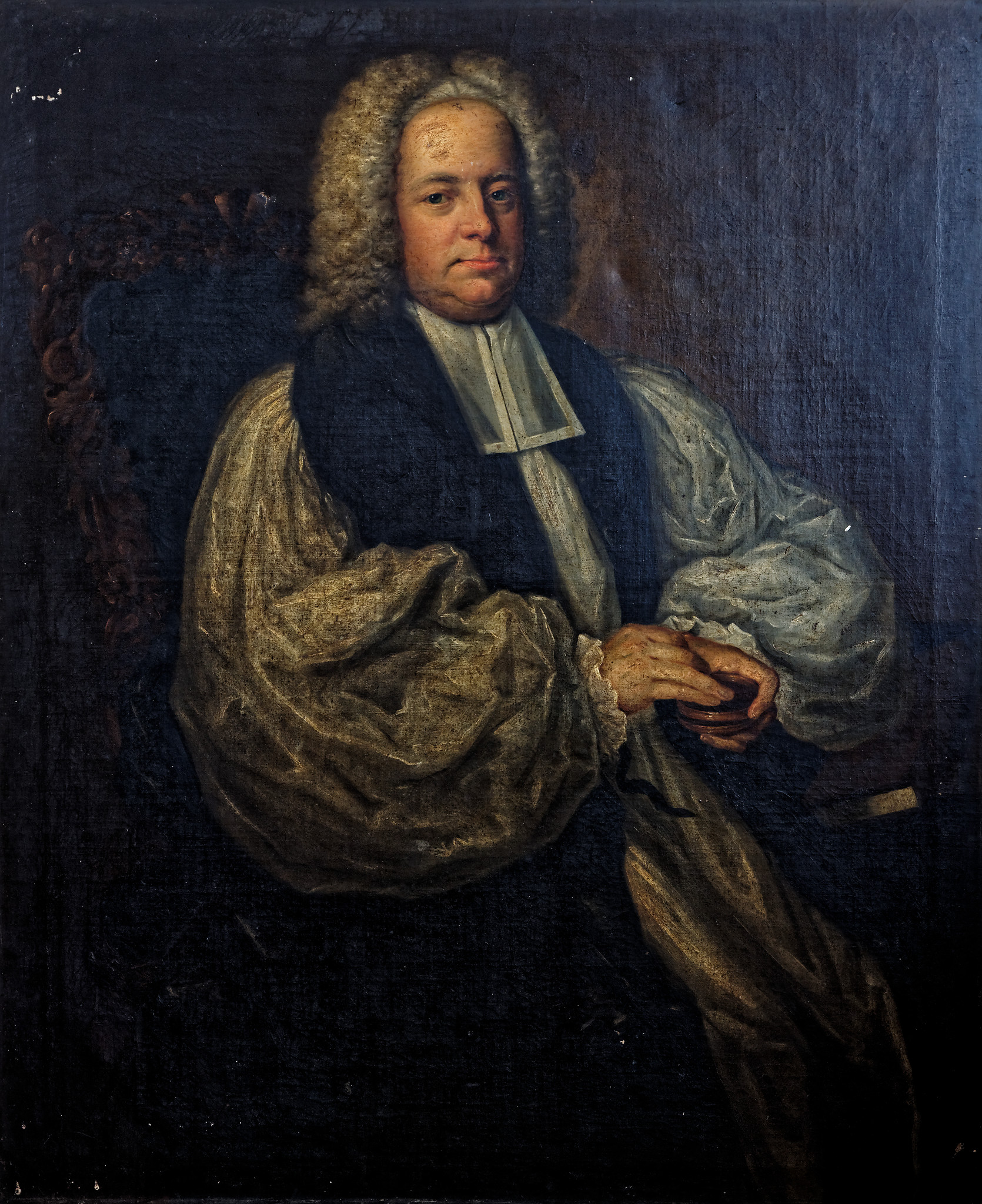
- See: Killala and Achonry
- Installed: 1735
- Term ended: 1751
- Predecessor: Robert Clayton
- Successor: Richard Robinson
- Other post: Bishop of Clonfert

Orders
- Ordination: 1714
- Consecration: 1 April 1732 by Edward Synge

Personal details
- Born: 7 August 1687
- Died: 2 October 1751 (aged 64)
- Buried: St Patrick's Cathedral, Killala
- Denomination: Church of Ireland
- Spouse: Catherine Courthorpe
- Education: Christ's Hospital; Trinity College, Cambridge

Mordecai Cary (1687–1751) was Bishop of Killala and Achonry.

== Early years ==
Mordecai Cary was born in London on 7 August 1687 and baptized eight days later at St Faith-under-St.Pauls' He was the eldest son, the second of eight children born to John Carrey, citizen and cook, of Ivy Lane, who married Jane Cheese on 15 June 1684 at Temple Church. According to the will of his uncle, William Cary, carman of Whitechapel, five of the children survived until at least 1711. Mordecai's grandfather was William Cary, gunsmith, of Tower Hill.

Mordecai was educated at the bluecoat charity school, Christ's Hospital, entering on 13 July 1695, not as an orphan, but on the gift of John Phillips, cook, who left a gift specifically for two "poor children of such poor members of the company of cooks as by the master and wardens of the said company should from time to time be presented". In 1705, Mordecai and a fellow student were examined by Rev John Harris as to their suitability for university and found to be "so very expert and well qualified in their learning that to detain them any longer from university will be a manifest injury to them". On 7 May 1705 he received a scholarship to Trinity College, Cambridge and was admitted 19 May 1705 at age 17, from which he received his B.A. 1708/9, Fellow, 1711, M.A. 1712.

In 1709, Dr Richard Bentley, classical scholar and Master of Trinity College, Cambridge, applied to the Governors of Christ's Hospital for Mordecai to travel abroad under the tutelage of older graduate, Mr James Jurin (1684–1750), as being "the best way for their improvement and rising in the world". Mordecai was subsequently granted £29.16.8. at his setting out in 1709. They travelled to Leyden, one of the most important centres for the study of medicine and natural Philosophy during the eighteenth century to attend the lectures of Hermann Boerhaave. Mordecai and Jurin became lifelong friends. Some of their correspondence is preserved at the Wellcome Library.

On 23 May 1714 Mordecai was ordained as a deacon.

== Family ==
Two years later, Mordecai obtained a licence to marry at St James' Church, Duke Street but there does not appear to be an entry for such a marriage at that church. According to his son's documentation, on 9 February 1715/16, London he married Catherine COURTHORPE of Weybridge, Surrey (dau. and co-heir of Thomas of the parish of St Dunstan in the West, Fleet St.).

Mordecai and Catherine's children were:

- Anne bpt.27 June 1716 Cold Norton, Essex (Ref: 571176)
- Henry Cary bpt.2 June 1717 St Andrew Undershaft, London (Ref: 374408/9)
- Catherine bpt.23 July 1719 Morpeth, Northumberland (Ref: 415391) d.bef 1752
- William bpt.23 August 1725 St Katherine Coleman, London (Ref: 560022/3) d.bef 1752

== Career ==
From 1717, until he left for Ireland in 1732, Mordecai was rector of St Katherine Coleman in the city of London. Also commonly spelt St Catherine Coleman, the Church was in poor structural condition while Mordecai was there. Rebuilding began in 1739; it was eventually demolished in 1925/6.

Mordecai was, from 1718 to 1724, headmaster of The King Edward VI School, Morpeth, Northumberland, where he is credited with restoring the school's dwindling prestige after a staff feud prior to his appointment, and increasing the attendance from 26 to 100: he was also perpetual curate of Jarrow, co. Durham 1722–24.

He received his Doctor of Divinity at Lambeth Palace in London, by William Wake, Archbishop of Canterbury; his patent bears the date 22 March 1731. Thereafter, he was appointed chaplain to Lionel Sackville, 1st Duke of Dorset. According to The Dublin Gazette, the Duke of Dorset arrived in Dublin on 11 September 1731 and was sworn in as Lord Lieutenant of Ireland, under George II. On 1 April 1732 in St Anne's Church, Dublin, Cary was consecrated Bishop of Clonfert and Kilmacduagh, County Galway, which position he held to 1838. He was, in fact, consecrated on 26 March "by the Archbishop of Tuam, assisted by the Bishops of Killala and Elphin; and was enthroned at Clonfert on June 5th, and at Kilmacduagh on June 16th".

Clonfert was the abbey and cathedral founded by Brendan the Navigator in c. 557, and its school became one of the most famous and largest in western Ireland. In 1579, Elizabeth I wrote to the Bishop of Clonfert regarding a consideration that a university be founded there; Dublin was chosen instead.

On 27 September 1735 The Dublin Gazette read: "On Wednesday last arrived here the Duke and Duchess of Dorset with the Rt Hon. Walter Cary, His Grace's chief secretary." On this visit by the Duke, "1735-6 Mordecai Cary DD Bishop of Clonfert, was translated to the Sees by patent dated December 20th and was enthroned by proxy at Achonry on March 19th and at Killala next day". See Bishop of Killala and Achonry, County Mayo.

St Patrick's Cathedral, Killala is also significant in Irish church history in that St Patrick himself, in the 5th century, declared Killala, previously known as "the wood (forest) of Foclut" to be the origin of his call to evangelise the Irish. Killala derives from the Irish "Cill Aille" meaning Church of Ailill.

Mordecai remained at Killala until his death in 1751. The inscription on his tomb in the floor of St Patrick's Cathedral, Killala reads:

To the memory of the
Rt. Revd. Father in God
Mordecai Cary D.D.
Late L^{d} Bishop of Killala and Achon
who departed this life
Oct^{r} y^{e} 2^{d} A. Dom 1751
in the 65 year
of his age.
Catherine Cary his beloved wife
caused this stone to be laid.
Near him lye four of his grandchildren.

Mordecai's appointment at Killala became a family affair. His son, Henry Cary (1717–1769), became Archdeacon of Killala from 1742, aged 24 or 25. The Dean of Killala at this time was Theophilus Brocas (c.1710-1770) whose son, John, succeeded him as Dean, and whose daughter, Henrietta, married the Archdeacon's son, William.

Henry Francis Cary, translator of Dante's "Divine Comedy", was the son of William Cary and Henrietta Brocas, and the great-grandson of Mordecai Cary, D.D., Bishop of Killala and Achonry.

In his will, Cary mentioned only one surviving son, Henry Cary, to whom went all his estate, with the exception of that reserved for his widow's use, namely the house and furniture in Henry St, Dublin. He also left the sum of 20 English pounds, to be paid out of his English Concerns, to his brother, William.

== Portrait of Bishop Mordecai Cary ==
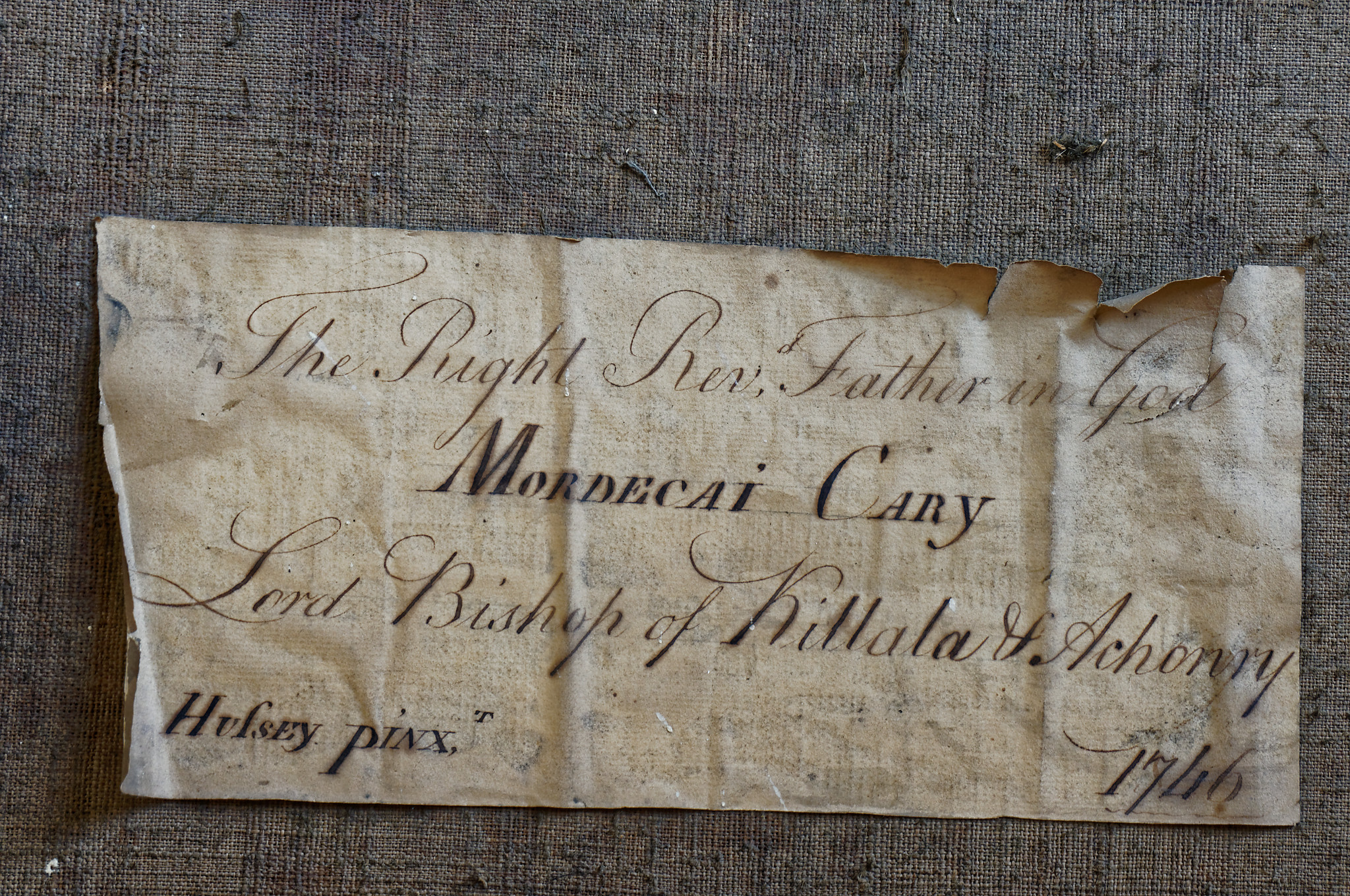
Note on back of portrait of Bishop Mordecai Carey
