= John Walls (priest) =

John Walls was an Irish Anglican priest in the 17th century.

Walls was educated at Trinity College, Dublin. He was Archdeacon of Achonry from 1735 to 1755; and Vicar general from 1736. He died in 1770.
