= William Colvin (priest) =

Irish Anglican priest

William Evans Colvin
- Dean of Killala; Archdeacon of Killala
- Church: Church of Ireland
- Diocese: Diocese of Killala
- Other posts: Curate at Killoran, Didsbury, and Wotton, Surrey; Incumbent at Dromard

Orders
- Ordination: 1890

Personal details
- Born: January 26, 1858 County Limerick, Ireland
- Died: September 30, 1949 (aged 91) Brighton, England
- Education: Trinity College Dublin

William Evans Colvin (26 January 1858, Co. Limerick–30 September 1949, Brighton) was an Anglican priest in Ireland in the late nineteenth and early 20th centuries.

Colvin was educated at Trinity College, Dublin and ordained in 1890. He served curacies in Killoran, Didsbury and Wotton, Surrey. He was the incumbent at Dromard from 1895 to 1926 and Archdeacon of Killala from 1911 until 1928 when he became Dean of Killala.
