= Wendy Callan =

Wendy Mary Callan is the former Dean of Killala from 2012 to 2013.

Callan was born in 1952, educated at Oxford Brookes University and ordained in the Church of England in 1999. After a curacy in Bicester she was Vicar of Shipton-under-Wychwood from 2003 until 2010. In that year she became the incumbent at Kilmoremoy.
