= Thomas Walls =

Thomas Walls was an Anglican priest in Ireland in the 17th century.

Walls was educated at Trinity College, Dublin. He was Archdeacon of Achonry from 1705 to 1712; and then again from 1719 to 1734.
