= Diocese of Killala =

Diocese of Killala may refer to:

- Roman Catholic Diocese of Killala, a diocese in the west of Ireland
- The former Church of Ireland diocese of Killala in the west of Ireland is now incorporated within the united Diocese of Tuam, Limerick and Killaloe

== See also ==
- Bishop of Killala
- Bishop of Killala and Achonry
- Bishop of Tuam, Killala and Achonry
