= James Verschoyle =

Irish Anglican bishop

James Verschoyle, LL.D. (1747–1834) was an Irish Anglican bishop.

Educated at Trinity College, Dublin, he was successively Archdeacon of Glendalough, Dean of St Patrick's Cathedral, Dublin and Bishop of Killala and Achonry.

He died in April 1834.

Religious titles
Preceded by John Gast	Archdeacon of Glendalough; 1788 – 1791	Succeeded by James Hastings
Preceded by Robert Fowler	Dean of St Patrick's Cathedral, Dublin; 1794– 1810	Succeeded by John Keatinge
Preceded by Joseph Stock	Bishop of Killala and Achonry; 1810 – 1834	Succeeded by Power Le Poer Trench; Archbishop of Tuam to which Killala & Achonry was united
