= Daniel Witter =

Irish Anglican Bishop

Daniel Witter (died 1675) was an Irish Anglican priest in the seventeenth century.

He was born in England and moved to Ireland as chaplain to the James Butler, 1st Duke of Ormonde, Lord Lieutenant of Ireland. He was Dean of Ardfert from 1661 to 1664 when he became Dean of Down. He was nominated to be the Bishop of Killaloe on 4 August 1669 and consecrated in September that year.

He died in office on 16 March 1675.

Church of England titles
Preceded by Thomas Gray	Dean of Ardfert; 1661–1664	Succeeded by Thomas Bladen
Preceded by Thomas Bayly	Dean of Down; 1664–1669	Succeeded by William Sheridan
Preceded by Edward Worth	Bishop of Killaloe; 1669–1675	Succeeded by John Roan
