= Thomas Allen (dean of Achonry) =

Thomas Allen (2 November 1873, in Ballymena – 16 May 1927, in Coolaney) was Dean of Achonry from 1916 until his death.

Allen was educated at Ballymena Academy and Trinity College, Dublin. After curacies in Maryborough and Galway he was Diocesan Inspector of Religious Education in the Diocese of Tuam, Killala and Achonry. He was Rector of Killoran with Kilvarnet from 1904; and a Canon of St Patrick's Cathedral, Dublin from 1904 until 1916. He was also Examining Chaplain to the Bishop of Tuam from 1923.

Church of Ireland titles
Preceded by Thomas Gordon Walker	Dean of Achonry; 1916–1927	Succeeded by John Harden
