= George Heather =

George Abraham Heather was an Anglican priest in Ireland in the second half of the nineteenth century and the first decade of the 20th.

Allen was educated at Trinity College, Dublin. After a curacy in Ardrahan he was Rector of St John, Cincinnati from 1860 to 1962; Secretary of the CMS in Ireland from 1863 to 1967; and Incumbent of Dugort from 1866 to 1871. He was Rector of Achonry from 1871; an Honorary Canon of St. Crumnathy's Cathedral, Achonry from 1875 to 1894; Archdeacon of Achonry from 1894 to 1895; and Dean of Achonry (and Prebendary of Kilmovee) from 1895. He died on 7 February 1907.
