= Denis O'Miachain =

Denis O'Miachain (also recorded as Tomás Ó Miadacháin) was Archdeacon of Achonry until 1266, when he was consecrated Bishop of Achonry; he died in 1285.
