= Francis Stephen Cary =

English painter and art teacher (1808–1880)

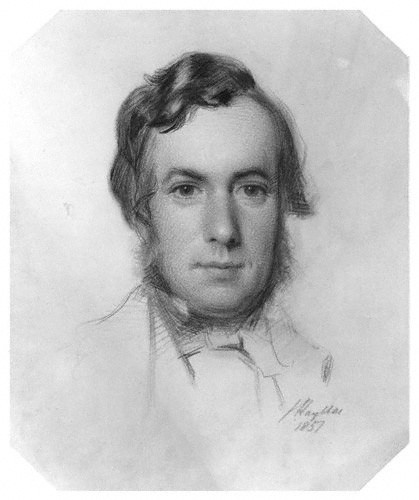
- portrait by James Hayllar
- Born: 10 May 1808; Kingsbury, Warwickshire
- Died: 5 January 1880 (aged 71); Abinger, Surrey
- Education: Sass's Academy
- Occupation: Educator
- Known for: Running a school for artists

Francis Stephen Cary (10 May 1808 – 6 January 1880) was an English painter and art teacher, who succeeded Henry Sass as the head of his art academy. Among Cary's subjects was a portrait of Charles and Mary Lamb.

== Life and work ==
Cary was born in Kingsbury, Warwickshire, a younger son of the Rev. Henry Francis Cary, (author and translator of Dante), who was the local vicar. His brother Henry became a judge in New South Wales.

Cary was educated at home, chiefly by his father, before becoming a pupil of Henry Sass at his well-known art academy in Bloomsbury, London. Cary later became a student at the Royal Academy and for a short time painted in the studio of Sir Thomas Lawrence. Lawrence died before Cary could become his pupil.

In 1829, Cary studied in Paris and afterwards in Italy and at the Art School at Munich. In 1833, 1834 and 1836, he accompanied his father on a foreign tour. In subsequent years he exhibited several pictures at the Society of British Artists and elsewhere.

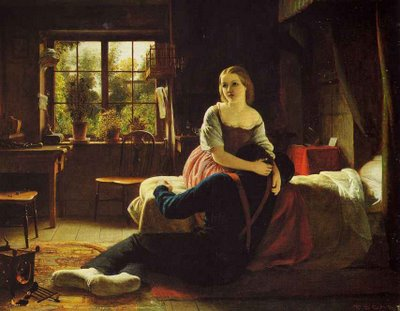
Consolation

In 1841, Cary married Louisa, daughter of Charles Allen Philipps of St Bride's Hill, Pembrokeshire. The following year he returned as manager to Sass's Art School in Bloomsbury, which had been founded on the model of the Italian Bolognese School of painting. Cary exhibited 35 paintings at The Royal Academy between 1837 and 1876 and was a candidate in the Westminster Hall competitions for the decoration of the Houses of Parliament, held in 1844 and 1847.

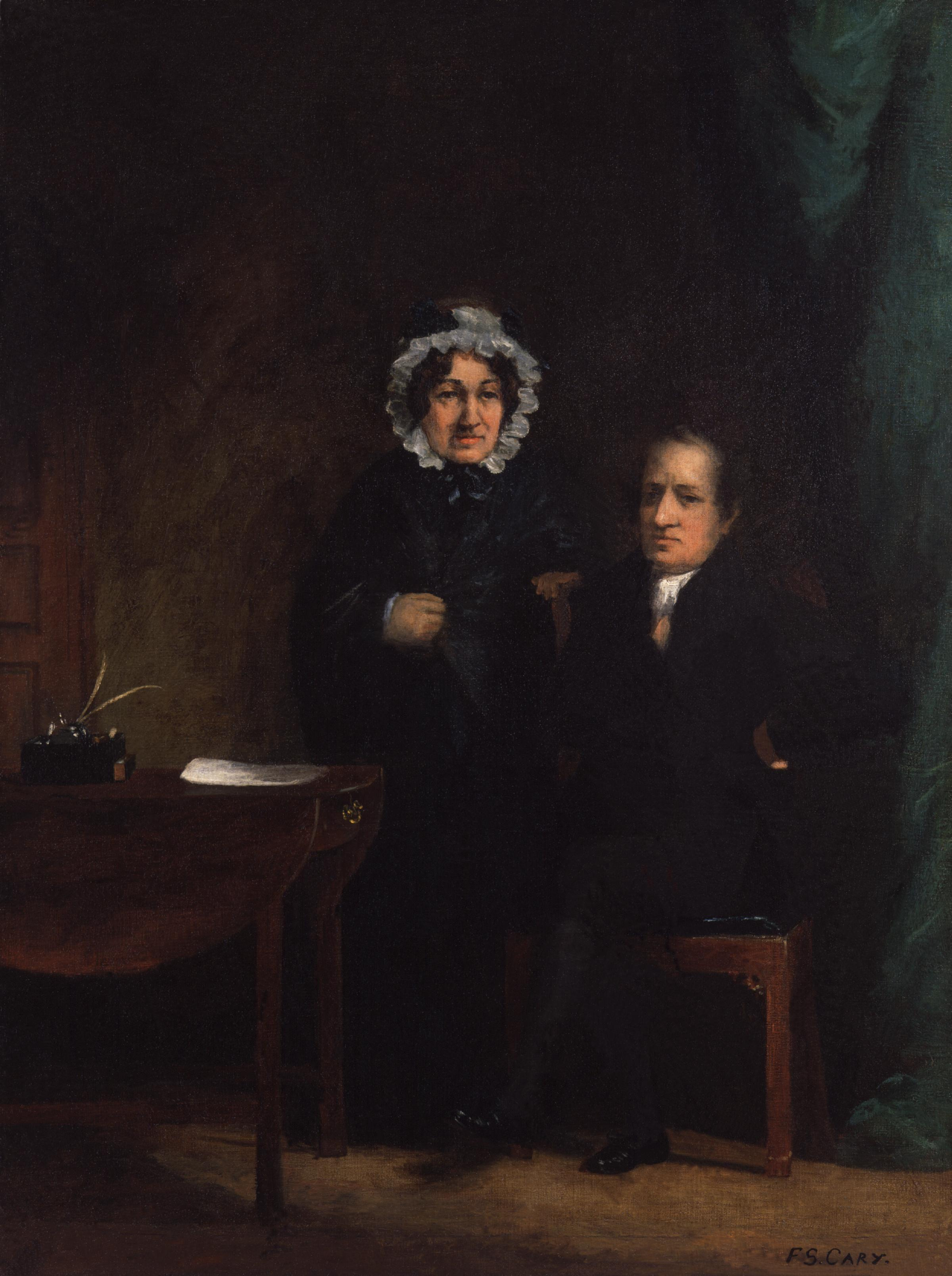
Cary's 1834 portrait of Mary and Charles Lamb

In 1874, Cary retired to Abinger in Surrey, where he died on 6 January 1880. He left no family. In the early part of his life, he enjoyed much of the literary society of the day through his father's social connections. His paintings include an interesting portrait of Charles and Mary Lamb. commissioned by John Mathew Gutch.
