= Theophilus Landey =

Anglican priest

Theophilus Patrick Landey (1851-1935) was an Anglican priest in Ireland in the late nineteenth and early 20th centuries.

Landy was educated at Trinity College, Dublin and ordained in 1896. After a curacy in Galway he held incumbencies at Tumna and Foxford. He was Archdeacon of Achonry from 1905 to 1915; and Dean of Killala from 1915 to 1928.
