= Benjamin Phipps =

Irish Anglican cleric

Benjamin Phipps, D.D. was a 17th-century Anglican Dean in Ireland.

Crosse was educated at Trinity College, Dublin. He was Dean of Ferns from 1670 to 1682; Chancellor of Christ Church Cathedral, Dublin from 1673 to 1682; and Dean of Down from 1682 to 1683.
