= William Jackson (priest, died 1885) =

Anglican priest in Ireland during 19th century

William Jackson was an Anglican priest in Ireland during the 19th century.

Jackson was born in Mayo, County Mayo and educated at Trinity College Dublin. He was ordained in 1834 and his first post was a curacy in Headford. He was the incumbent at Castleconner from 1866 and Dean of Killala from 1872, holding both post until his death in 1885.
