= John Gore (priest) =

Irish Anglican priest (1820-1894)

John Ribton Gore (died 20 November 1894) was an Anglican priest in Ireland in the nineteenth century.

Gore was born in County Cavan and educated at Trinity College, Dublin. He was ordained in 1851 and was for many years the incumbent at Dromard. He was Archdeacon of Achonry from 1883 until his death.

His son, John Ellard Gore, was an astomoner.
