= Hugh Henry Mitchell (politician) =

Irish politician and banker (c. 1741 – April 1830)

Hugh Henry Mitchell (c. 1741 – April 1830), of Glasnevin and Merrion Castle, was an Irish politician and banker.

== Early life ==
Mitchell was the eldest son of Henry Mitchell (1716–1768) and Mary Webber (d. 1779), a daughter of Edward Webber of Cork. His father was the senior partner in the bank of Mitchell and Macarell, and MP for Castlebar and Bannow. Among his siblings were Lt.-Col. Edward Mitchell, Mary Mitchell (wife of Macarell-King), Margaret Mitchell (wife of Robert King), Anne Mitchell (wife of Maurice Coppinger, MP for Ardfert, Roscommon, and Belturbet), and Catherine Mitchell (wife of John Monck Mason, MP for Blessington and St Canice).

His father was the only son of merchant Hugh Mitchell of London, and Jane (née Henry) Finlay. His grandmother, a widow of a Mr. Finlay, was the daughter of Robert Henry, a Presbyterian Minister, and sister to Hugh Henry, MP for Newtown Limavady and Antrim, and banker whose firm, Hugh Henry & Co., was the predecessor to his father's firm, Mitchell and Macarell).

== Career ==
He was a member of the Parliament of Ireland for Ballyshannon between 1766 and 1768 and for Enniskillen in 1771. After leaving Parliament, he opened a banking office at 11 Ormond Quay c. 1777, but his bank "soon faded out of existence".

== Personal life ==
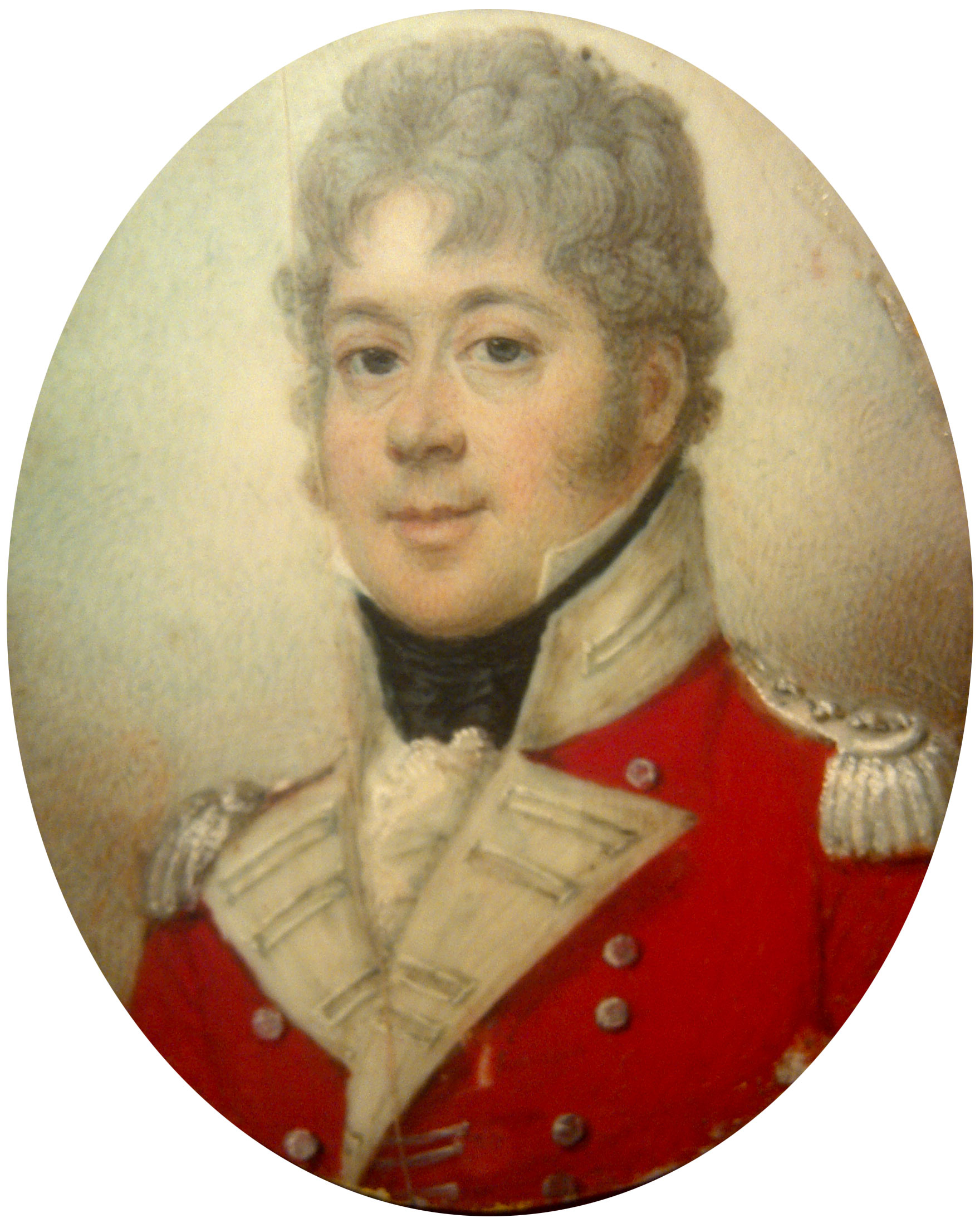
Miniature portrait of his son, Col. Hugh Henry Mitchell, CB

In 1763, Mitchell married Margaret Gordon (b. c. 1750), daughter of Elizabeth Glen and James Gordon, 2nd of Ellon, Scotland. Together, they lived at Glasnevin, County Dublin, and were the parents of:

- Mary Harriet Mitchell (d. 1842), who married Very Rev. James Langrishe, son of Rt. Hon. Sir Hercules Langrishe, 1st Baronet, in 1796.
- Col. Hugh Henry Mitchell (1770–1817), who married Lady Harriett Somerset, a daughter of Henry Somerset, 5th Duke of Beaufort, in 1804.
- Anne Mitchell (b. 1778), who married Hans Hamilton, son of James Hamilton of Sheephill and Holmpatrick, Deputy Prothonotary of the Court of King's Bench.

Mitchell died in Dublin in April 1830.

Parliament of Ireland
Preceded by Michael Clarke; John Gustavus Handcock	Member of Parliament for Ballyshannon; 1766–1768; With: Michael Clarke	Succeeded by Michael Clarke; Francis Andrews
Preceded by Richard Gorges; Bernard Smyth Ward	Member of Parliament for Enniskillen; 1771–1776; With: Richard Gorges	Succeeded by Sir Archibald Acheson, Bt; John Leigh
