= Hamilton Townsend =

Irish Anglican priest

Hamilton Townsend (1843?-1895) was an Anglican priest in Ireland in the second half of the nineteenth century

Allen was born in County Down, educated at Trinity College, Dublin and ordained in 1850. He was Rector of Killoran from 1862; Archdeacon of Achonry from 1862 to 1883; and a Canon of St Patrick's Cathedral, Dublin from 1875. He was Dean of Achonry from 1883 until his death.
