= Richard Sass =

English painter (1774–1849)

Richard Sass (1774 – 7 September 1849) (or Sasse) was an English landscape painter, etcher, and drawing master to royalty. He was the half brother of Henry Sass, the founder of Sass's Academy in London.

Sass exhibited at the Royal Academy in London from 1791 to 1813. He was appointed teacher in drawing to the Princess Charlotte, and later landscape painter to the Prince Regent. In 1825 he removed to Paris, where he spent the remainder of his life, altering his surname to "Sasse". He was married to Harriet (née Blake), who died in 1866, aged 76. He died in Paris on 7 September 1849.

Sasse enjoyed landscape-painting, especially with watercolours. In 1810 he published a series of etchings from picturesque scenery in Ireland, Scotland, and elsewhere.
