= Hugh Henry Mitchell =

British military leader

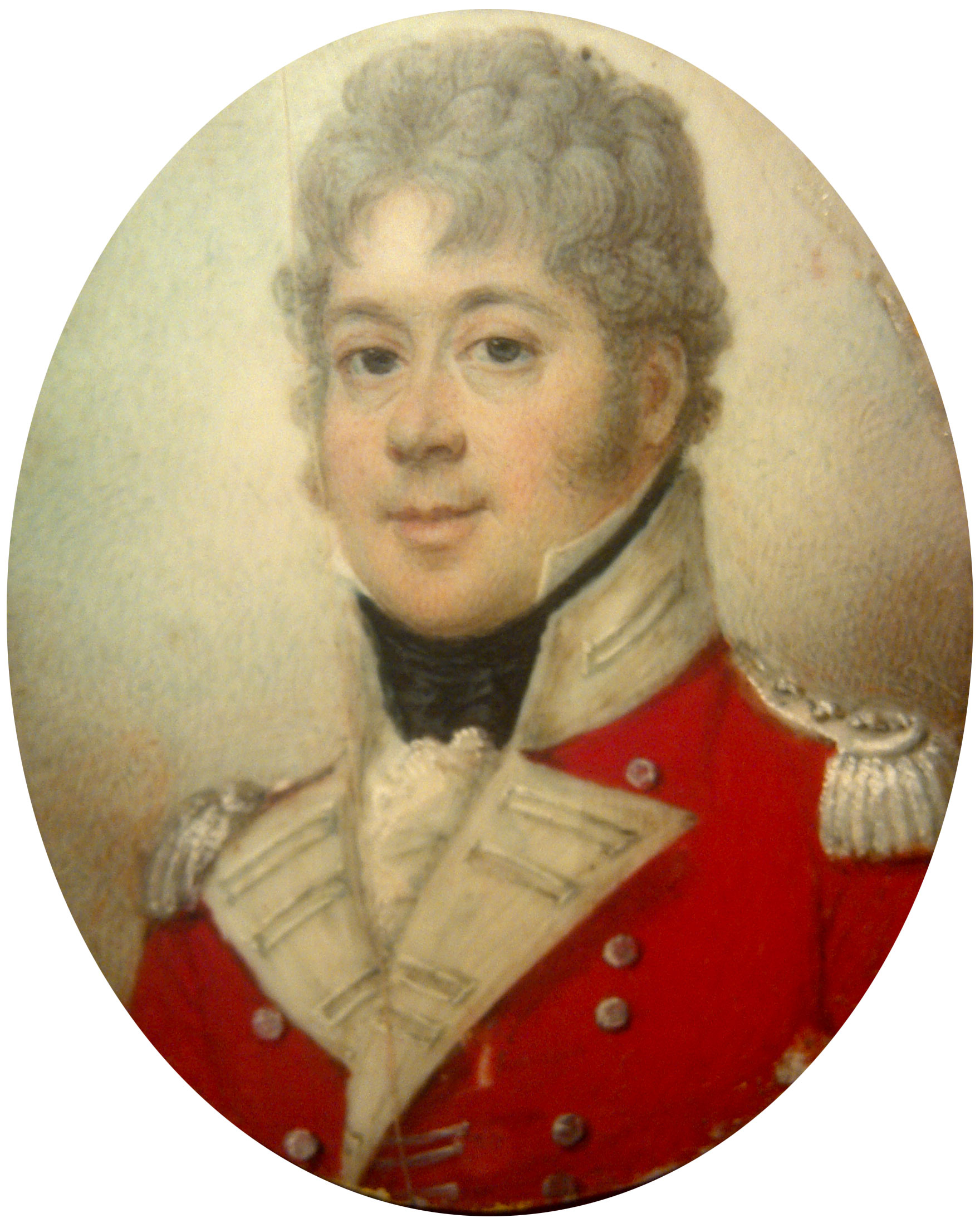
- Colonel Hugh Henry Mitchell, CB
- Born: 9 June 1770
- Died: 20 April 1817 (aged 46); London, England
- Military career
- Allegiance: United Kingdom
- Branch: British Army
- Service years: 1782–1815
- Rank: Colonel
- Commands: 51st Regiment of Foot
- Conflicts: Battle of Salamanca; Battle of Waterloo
- Awards: Companion of the Order of the Bath; Order of St. Andrew; Order of St. Vladimir (3rd Class); Order of St. Anna; Military Order of Maria Theresa; Gold Medal for Salamanca

Colonel Hugh Henry Mitchell, CB (9 June 1770 – 20 April 1817) was a British military leader, of Irish birth, who fought in several decisive battles during the Napoleonic Wars, including the Battle of Salamanca and the Battle of Waterloo, and was commended by the Duke of Wellington.

== Early life ==
He was born in 1770 in Glasnevin, Dublin. His father was Hugh Henry Mitchell Sr., a prosperous Irish banker and prominent member of the Irish House of Commons. His mother was Margaret Gordon of Ellon. His father suffered severe financial losses in the late 1770s, and it was his uncle, General Alexander Gordon who encouraged him to join the army at the age of eleven.

== Career ==
Mitchell was commissioned in January 1782 as an ensign, in the 101st Regiment of Foot. He was promoted to lieutenant in June 1783 and served with that regiment in India until it was disbanded in 1784. In May 1786 he was Gazetted to the 26th Regiment of Foot, serving in Canada until 1796. He then fought with the regiment in the Egyptian Campaign of 1801. He became a major on 17 March 1804 and was promoted to lieutenant-colonel on 12 December 1805 still in the service of the 26th Regiment of Foot. Mitchell commanded a battalion of the 26th Regiment of Foot from 1805 to 1811 and then the 51st Regiment of Foot from 13 June 1811 until 1814, throughout the Peninsular War. He gained the rank of colonel on 4 June 1813. He saw action at the Battle of Salamanca, siege of Burgos, San Marcial, the Nivelle and Orthez. He was mentioned in dispatches for San Marcial and was awarded a Gold Medal for commanding a battalion at Salamanca and Orthez. He gained the Companion Order of the Bath on 4 June 1815 and received the Russian Order of St. Vladimir.

In the Waterloo campaign Mitchell commanded the 4th Brigade of the 4th Division, consisting of the 3rd battalion of the 14th foot, the 1st Battalion of 23rd Fusiliers, and the 1st Battalion of the 51st Light Infantry, a total of around 2,000 officers and men. 'As the light was beginning to fail (on 17 June 1815) Colonel Mitchell led his brigade to the position ... on the extreme right near Braine-l'Alleud, and here the regiments bivouacked [sic] for the night, the rain continuing to fall in torrents.' Mitchell's brigade was engaged early in the battle when the French attacked Hougoumont Farm." At the commencement of the Battle of Waterloo, his brigade was posted according to Siborne as follows: Along the portion of the avenue leading to Hougoumont from the Nivelle Road, was extended the light company of the 23rd, on its right was an abatis across the road and a company of the 51st stationed there. Four further companies of the 51st and the light company of the 14th were extended along the hollow way which was an extension of the Hougoumont Avenue. The remainder of the 51st and the 14th stood behind them in reserve. The 23rd stood to the left of the Nivelle road in reserve to the Guards Brigade. As the Guards moved off to reinforce Hougoumont, the 23rd moved up to form the main reserve on that position and was forced to form square during the waves of cavalry attacks in the mid afternoon. Although the brigade did not hold a conspicuous part in the battle, they were vital to the defence of Wellington's right wing. They were formed with the Brunswickers to secure the right of the line from French incursions via the shallow valley running north from Hougoumont or French cavalry attacks from the French extreme left. Much of their role was to stand and take punishment from the French artillery, while maintaining a solid presence to dissuade the French cavalry from attacking. When Chasse's Dutch troops were sent off from Braine l'Alleud to bolster the allied centre during the final attacks of the Imperial Guard, Mitchell's troops were the only defence of this wing left. The Brigade lost 4 officers and 27 other ranks killed; 9 officers and 119 other ranks wounded. Mitchell was one of the few officers below the rank of general to be mentioned by the Duke of Wellington's Waterloo Dispatch. The brigade then participated in the subsequent march to Paris.

== Personal life ==
Mitchell married Lady Harriet Isabella Somerset, daughter of Henry Somerset, 5th Duke of Beaufort and Elizabeth Boscawen, on 3 July 1804. Together, they were the parents of:

- Margaret Harriet Isabella Mitchell (1806–1876), who married the Rev. Thomas Walpole, Canon of Winchester Cathedral, elder brother of Home Secretary Spencer Horatio Walpole, in 1833.
- Charlotte Gertrude Elizabeth Mitchell (1807–1876), who married John Leveson-Gower in 1825.
- Col. Hugh Andrew Robert Mitchell (1816–1857), of the Grenadier Guards, who married Sarah Lowndes in 1844.

He died on 20 April 1817 at age 46 at Queen Anne Street, London, England. He was buried in St Marylebone Churchyard.
