= Henry Hall (bishop) =

English Anglican priest

Henry Hall (1615 – 1663) was an English Anglican priest in Ireland in the seventeenth century.

A native of Wells, Somerset, he was educated at Lincoln College, Oxford. He was Chaplain to James Butler, 1st Duke of Ormonde. He became a Prebendary of Ossory in 1642, and Precentor of Christ Church Cathedral, Dublin in 1647. He was appointed Dean of Cork in 1643, (though his appointment was blocked by the Cathedral chapter in favour of Edward Worth); Vicar of Harwell, Oxfordshire (then Berkshire) in the following year; and Bishop of Killala and Achonry in 1661, a post he held until his death on 23 July 1663.
