= John Archdall (archdeacon of Ferns) =

Irish priest

John Archdall (13 January 1804 – 11 May 1897) was an Irish Anglican priest.

Archdall was born in Wexford and educated at Trinity College, Dublin, He was ordained in 1828. He was appointed Rector of Newtownbarry in 1837 and Archdeacon of Ferns in 1875, holding both positions until his death
