= Henry Sass =

English painter and educator (1788–1844)

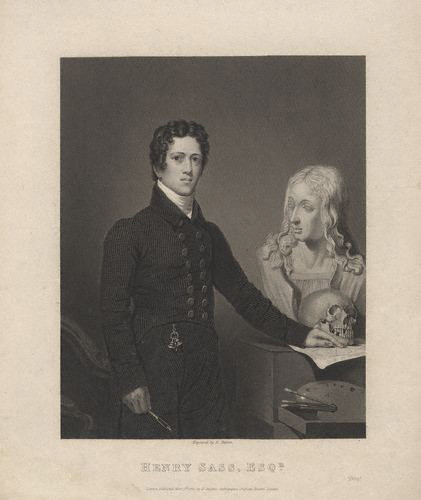
- Henry Sass
- Born: 24 April 1788; London
- Died: 1844 (aged 55–56)
- Education: Royal Academy
- Occupation: educator
- Known for: founding a school for artists

Henry Sass (24 April 1788 – 1844) was an English artist and teacher of painting, who founded an important art school, Sass's Academy (later "Cary's Academy"), in London, to provide training for those seeking to enter the Royal Academy. Many distinguished British painters received their early training here. Such was Sass's commitment to art education that Sir David Wilkie said he could have "taught a stone to draw".

== Life and work ==
Sass was born in London. His father, who was also an artist, belonged to an old Courland family from what is now Latvia. Sass's father and mother settled in London after their marriage and his elder half-brother Richard Sass became a landscape painter and art tutor to members of the royal family.

Sass became a student at the Royal Academy and practised his art by copying paintings held at the British Institution. His early work which was exhibited in 1807 and 1808 at the Royal Academy included, "The Descent of Ulysses into Hell" which Sass also executed as an etching. However his later work was portraiture. In 1815 he married Mary Robinson, whose family was related to the Earls of Ripon. In the same year he travelled to Italy, returning two years later. However, despite publishing a book about his Italian trip he was not able to make a living from his painting.

Sass decided to open the first school of drawing for artists who were intending to study at the Royal Academy' school. Sass established it in a house at No. 6 Charlotte Street, at the corner with Streatham Street, in Bloomsbury, London. Sass's pupils included Sir John Millais P.R.A., Charles West Cope K.A., William Powell Frith R.A., William Edward Frost R.A., and Walter Deverell. Sir Thomas Lawrence the President of the Royal Academy was amongst the school's supporters. Such was Sass's commitment to art education that Sir David Wilie said he could have taught a "stone to draw".

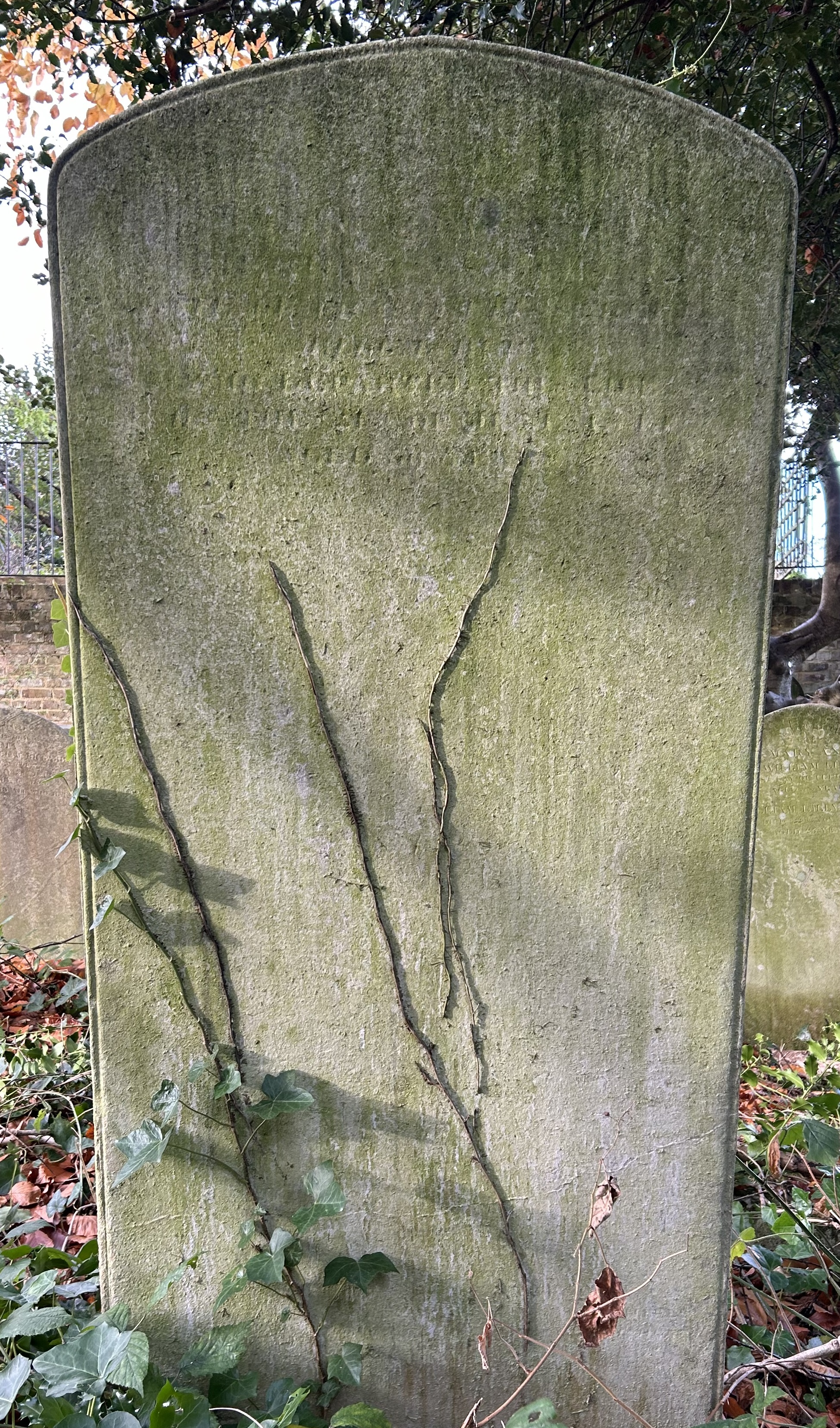
Grave of Henry Sass in Highgate Cemetery

Sass's Academy is caricatured in the novel "The Newcomes" by Thackeray, who was once a student at the school. The real academy, however, is only used as a basis for the fictional art school and Thackeray does not refer to Sass or his school in particular.

Sass was now well off and he and Mary entertained the intelligentsia of the day. Among his friends were Sir Edwin Landseer, William Etty, and particularly J. M. W. Turner. Two years before his death Sass passed the directorship of the school to Francis Stephen Cary due to his failing mental health. Sass died in 1844, having had nine children including an eldest surviving son, Henry William Sass who was an architect and Edwin Etty Sass who entered the medical profession. He was buried on the western side of Highgate Cemetery.

== Artistic recognition ==
A bust of Sass by William Grinsell Nicholl was commissioned in 1820.
