= Edmund Rowlatt =

Edmund Rowlatt (1633–1693) was an Anglican priest in the second half of the seventeenth century.

Rowlatt was born in Loddington, Northamptonshire and educated at Pembroke College, Cambridge. He was Archdeacon of Achonry from 1668 to 1693.
