= Henry Cary (judge) =

British barrister, classical scholar, clergyman and judge (1804–1870)

Henry Cary (12 February 1804 – 30 June 1870) was a barrister, classical scholar, Anglican clergyman, and early District Court Judge in the Colony of New South Wales.

Cary was born in Kingsbury, Warwickshire, where his father was vicar. His parents were Henry Francis Cary, translator of Dante's Divine Comedy, and Jane Ormsby. She was the daughter of James Wilmot Ormsby of Foxford, co. Mayo, and Sandymount, Dublin, and his wife Jane DeGualy. Jane's eldest brother was Sir Charles Montague Ormsby, Baronet.

== Classical education ==
Henry and his father were walking along the beach at Littlehampton one morning, his father reciting Homer out loud, when a gentleman heard it and introduced himself. He was Samuel Taylor Coleridge who was promptly invited home to dine. Coleridge and Charles Lamb became close friends of the family.

Cary was educated at Merchant Taylors' School from which he graduated on 5 April 1821 and was admitted to Worcester College, Oxford where he completed his own prose translation of Homer's Odyssey. BA 1824 and was admitted to Lincoln's Inn. In 1826 he was certified to act as Special Pleader, with a chamber in the Temple. He completed two treatise on law which were favourably received.

As well as for his scholastic endeavours, Cary was renowned for his eccentricities and audacious practical jokes.

Cary received his M.A. 1827 and was called to the Bar, choosing the Oxford circuit. At the end of that year, 11 September 1827 he married at St George's, Hanover Square to Isabella Carlton Dawson, aged 19, witnessed by Elmira Dawson. Isabella was the daughter of George D.L. Dawson, Esq, of Yorkshire and Brompton Square (who died 1 May 1832) and his wife Elmira, of Sloane St, Chelsea. They had two sons: Henry Francis, born 1829 Hammersmith, and George William, born 1832, baptised St Pancras.

== Change of career ==
Profoundly affected with depression by the death of his mother in 1832, he retired from legal practice and the next year took Holy Orders. He was ordained by Bishop Charles Richard Sumner of Winchester in July 1833.

Cary became curate of St Mary's Reading and continued to publish, this time on theological subjects. It is here that Cary met John Henry Newman. Henry Cary's biography of his father says that Cardinal Newman was an "intimate friend of his (the son) when they both had livings in Oxford".

Cary was a prolific writer, eventually resigning his cure in 1844 to pursue his classical studies. His father died the same year and Cary subsequently published a 2-volume "Memoir" of his father.

From 1847 to 1849 he was curate at Drayton, Berkshire. Here, his sense of humour was not appreciated and he became a target of unpleasant gossip.

== Emigration ==
In 1849, leaving his family to follow, Cary left for Sydney in the colony of New South Wales where he was welcomed and licensed by Bishop William Broughton who helped him set up a classical school. He assisted in the parish of Darling Point (formerly Alexandria), lived in St Mark's Crescent next to the church, and conducted St. Mark's Collegiate School. Among his pupils were the future well known figures: Sir James Reading Fairfax, James William Johnson, Fitzwilliam Wentworth, Henry Cary Dangar, Alexander Oliver, Sir Philip Sydney Jones, Randolph and Fred Want, and William Abbott Hirst, a District Court Judge in Queensland. He was regarded as the best classical scholar in Australia and was on intimate terms with Bishop Broughton who coached the boys in Greek when Mr Cary was unable to take the class. Cary remained at Darling Point until May 1851, and then ran a school for young men at the Windsor Barracks for four years. He was a much sought-after coach, and was eventually nominated as an examiner at the new Sydney university.

== Return to law ==
In 1855 Cary returned to law. He was admitted as a barrister on 7 July 1855 and commenced practice at once. He was said to be: "In truth a born lawyer. His shrewdness, his power of repartee, his love of fun, and much else about him all marked him for the law; and it may well have been considered by him matter of regret that he ever left it. As a barrister he made great headway in Sydney." He quickly won further preferment. From January 1856 to March 1857 he was Master in Equity; and on 21 January 1859 he was appointed a Judge of the District Court and Chairman of Quarter Sessions. On 11 April 1859 the first District Court sittings in the Colony under the District Courts Act, 1858, began at Windsor in the Cumberland and Coast District before Judge Cary. In 1861 he was transferred to the western district.

From November 1859, for five years, Cary lived at "Arborfield Lodge", on about 17 acres (69,000 m^{2}) of land two miles (3 km) from Liverpool, New South Wales. There, in leisure hours, he continued writing. In 1861 he edited "A Collection of Statutes Affecting New South Wales", the first such compilation of Acts of "practical utility" for the Colony, and a work that is still sometimes of use. In preparing it he was helped by his son William, a NSW barrister and for a short time on the Queensland Bar, and by W.H. Wilkinson, later a Judge of the District Court.

It was while they were living at Arborfield Lodge, that his wife, Isabella, died in 1862. Her headstone, still extant in the Liverpool pioneer cemetery, reads: "To the memory of Isabella, wife of Henry Cary, District Court Judge, who died 19th November, 1862 aged 51 years."

Cary continued to write on both law and the classics while pursuing his career until poor health forced his retirement in August 1869. He died at his home in Philip Street, Sydney at the age of 66 years, leaving two sons, Henry, who worked for HM Customs, and William, the barrister.

According to Cary's will, dated 19 May 1870 and addressed as 164 Philip St., Sydney, all real and personal property went to his two sons who were also named as executors. It was witnessed by Henry Cary, grandson of testator; and Kate Bolger, domestic servant of testator. Probate was granted on 20 July 1870 to Henry Cary and William Cary, executors. Goods sworn at 950 pounds, with a bequest to Samuel Hodgson Smyth of Ashfield Park: 10 pounds for purchase of water colour painting.

Cary's reputation was that he was a man of rare learning spiced with a sense of humour; kindly, industrious and careful in all his undertakings. In the opinion of his friends, he might have occupied, without presumption, a more prominent position than he did. He has left behind him many evidences of his literary talents and industry.

Though an Anglican all his life and career, in the last hours of his life, Judge Cary became agitated over matters of faith and, on calling for a priest, Rev. S. A. Sheehy, made confession according to the Roman Catholic church.

He was buried in the Roman Catholic burial ground at Petersham. When the land was resumed for the building of Lewisham Hospital, any remains found were re-interred at Rookwood, but there is no record of his new gravesite.

== Timeline ==
- 1812–1817 Merchant Taylors' School
- 1821–1824 Worcester College, Oxford, BA
- 1824 Admitted to Lincoln's Inn
- 1826 Certified Special Pleader
- 1826–1830 author of various legal works, MA
- 1827 called to the Bar
- 1830–1832 barrister, Hare Court (off Fleet St), Special Pleader on Oxford Circuit
- 1832 retired from practice
- 1833 Ordained
- 1834 Deacon 1834
- 1835 Curate of St Mary's, Reading, and later at Temple Cowley, near Oxford
- 1835–1840 editor of various religious books and tracts
- 1839–1844 Perpetual curate of Dayton, Bucks
- 1847–1849 editor and translator of various classical works
- 1849 Emigrated to NSW
- 1849–1851 Minister of St Mark's, Alexandria, and schoolmaster of St Mark's Collegiate School
- 1851–1855 Schoolmaster at Windsor Barracks
- 1855 returned to law
- 1856–1857 Master in Equity
- 1859–1869 District Court Judge
- 1861 published "A Collection of Statutes Affecting NSW"
- 1868 published two other legal works
