= Dean of Down =

Church of Ireland official

The Dean of Down is based in The Cathedral Church of the Holy and Undivided Trinity, Downpatrick within the Diocese of Down and Dromore of the Church of Ireland.

The current incumbent is W. Henry Blair.

== Deans of Down ==
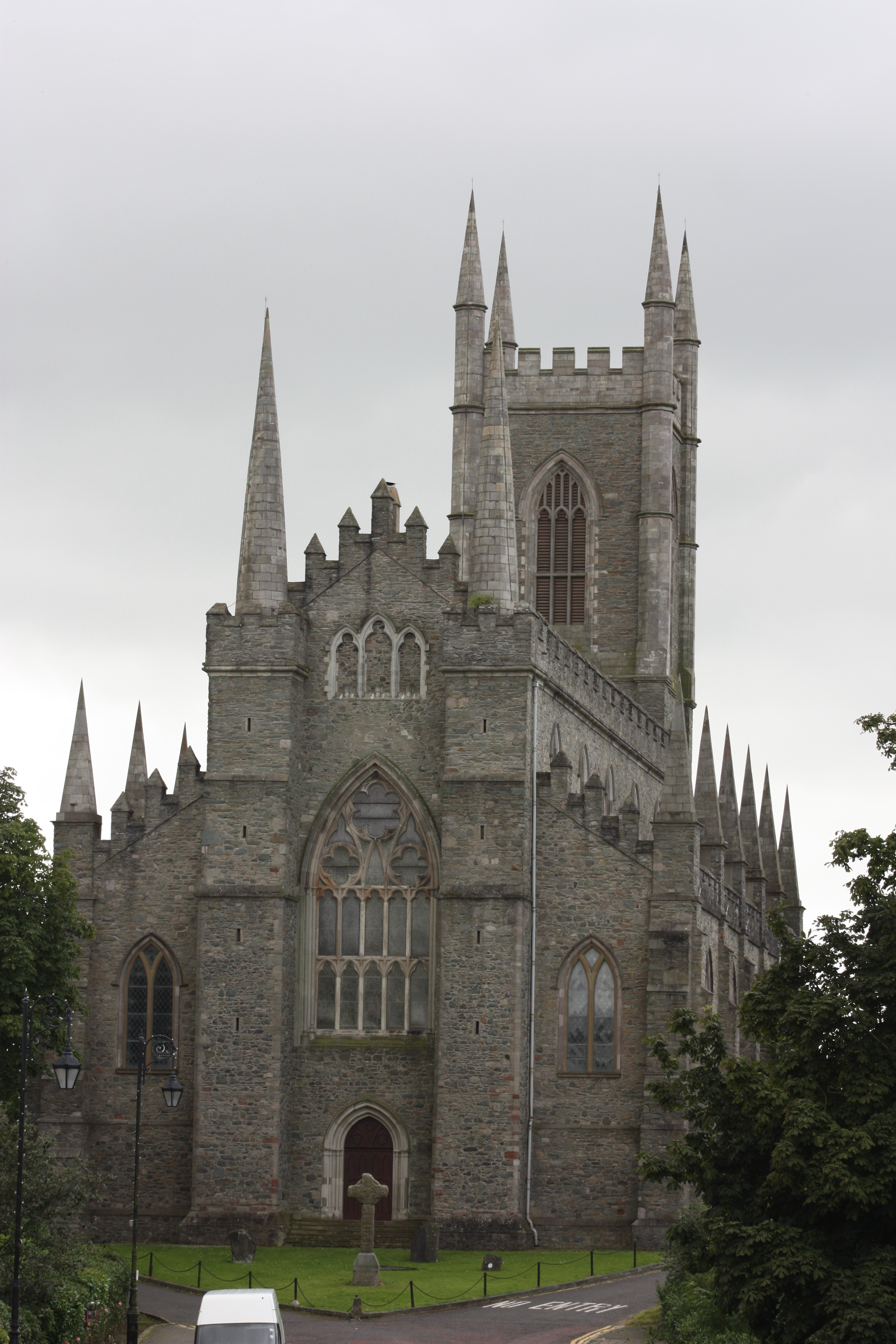
Down Cathedral

- 1541 Connor Magennis
- 1609–1622 John Gibson
- 1623–1627 Robert Dawson (afterwards Bishop of Clonfert and Kilmacduagh, 1627)
- 1627–1635 Henry Leslie (afterwards Bishop of Down and Connor, 1635
- 1635 William Coote (died before 1657)
- 1661/2 Thomas Bayly (afterwards Archdeacon of Connor, 1663 and then Bishop of Killala and Achonry, 1664)
- 1663/4–1669 Daniel Witter (afterwards Bishop of Killaloe
- 1669–1681/2 William Sheridan (afterwards Bishop of Kilmore and Ardagh, 1682)
- 1682–1682 Benjamin Phipps
- 1682/3–1709 John M'Neale
- 1709–1717 Ralph Lambert (afterwards Bishop of Dromore, 1717)
- 1717–1721 Benjamin Pratt
- 1721/2–1723 Charles Fairfax
- 1723/4–1731 William Gore
- 1731/2–1739 Richard Daniel
- 1739–1744 Thomas Fletcher (afterwards Bishop of Dromore, 1744)
- 1744–1768 Patrick Delany
- 1768–1787 James Dickson
- 1787–1817 Hon William Annesley
- 1817–1831 Edmund Knox (afterwards Bishop of Killaloe and Kilfenora, 1831)
- 1831–1839 Thomas Plunket (afterwards Bishop of Tuam, Killala and Achonry, 1839)
- 1839–1855 Theophilus Blakely
- 1856–1876 Thomas Woodward
- 1876–1887 Edward Busteed Moeran
- 1887–1912 Edward Maguire
- 1912–1923 John Pierce Brown
- 1923–1938 William Patrick Carmody
- 1938–1945 Cyril Elliott (afterwards Dean of Belfast, 1945)
- 1945–1954 Frederick Hatch
- 1955–1963 Walter Horatio Good
- 1964–1968 Alfred Weller Mussen Stanley Mann
- 1968–1980 Robert William Thomas Howard Kilpatrick
- 1980–?1987 John Herbert Rosmund Good
- 1987–1996 Hamilton Leckey
- 1997–2006 John Frederick Dinnen
- 2006–2024 Thomas Henry Hull
- 2025–present William Henry Blair
