= James Hastings (priest) =

Irish Anglican priest

James Hastings was an Irish Anglican priest.

He was Dean of Achonry from 1806 until 1812 having previously been Archdeacon of Glendalough. In 1803 his only daughter, Francis Hastings married Caesar Otway (1780-1842), who had previously taken holy orders and gained high literary attainments as a first rate scholar, having numerous works published.
