= Dean of Killala =

Church of Ireland official

The Dean of Killala is based at the Cathedral Church of St Patrick, Killala in the Diocese of Killala within the united bishopric of Tuam, Killala and Achonry of the Church of Ireland. The Cathedral Church of St Crumnathy, Achonry, was closed in 1997. The Chapters of Killala & Achonry were amalgamated in 2013; The Cathedral of St Patrick, Killala, becoming also the diocesan Cathedral of Achonry. The Dean of Killala is the Very Revd Diane Matchett, also Dean of Tuam.

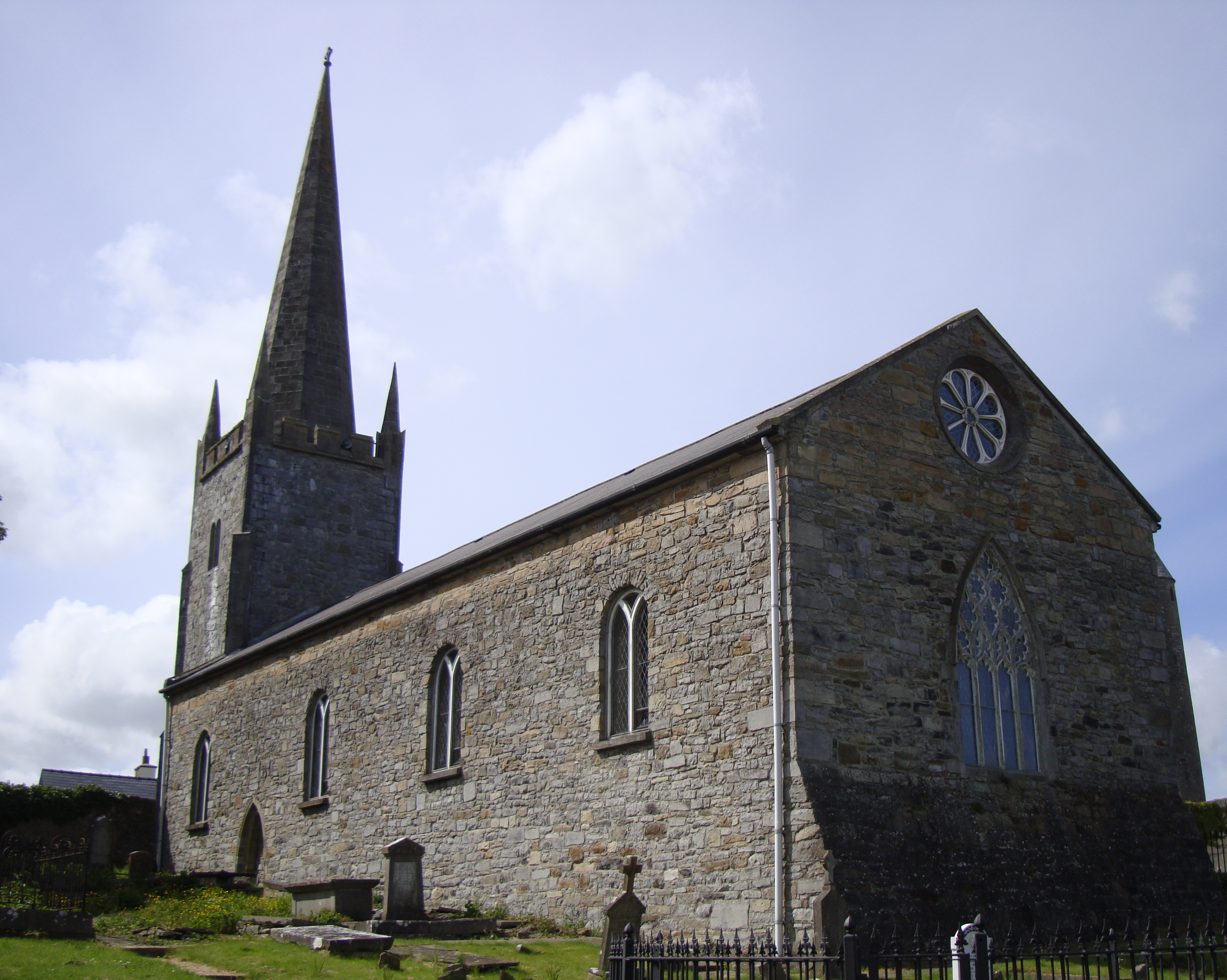
St Patrick's Cathedral Church, Killala

== List of deans of Killala ==
- 1613: William Flanagan
- 1628/9–1635: William Buchanan (afterwards Dean of Achonry, 1635)
- 1635: Robert Forgie
- 1664: Henry Dodwell
- 1674: Alexander Murray
- 1701–1718: Francis Knapp
- 1718–1724: Jonathan Smedley (afterwards Dean of Clogher, 1724)
- 1724–?1741: Peter Maturin (died 1741)
- 1741–1770: Theophilus Brocas
- 1770–1795: John Brocas
- 1795: Thomas Vesey Dawson
- 1796–1799: Thomas Thompson
- 1800–1805: Walter Blake Kirwan
- 1806–1817: Edmund Burton
- 1817–1844: Hon George Saunders Gore
- 1844–1871: James Collins
- 1871–1885: William Jackson
- 1885–1903: William Skipton
- 1903–?1904: William Oliver Jackson (died 1904)
- 1904–?1911: C. Ormsby Wiley
- 1911–?1915: George Henry Croly
- 1915–1927: Theophilus Patrick Landey
- 1928–>: William Colvin
- >1963–? Herbert Friedrich Friess (died 1997)
- ?–?1975 John Ernest Leeman (died 1975)
- 1976–1979: John Henry Hodgins
- 1979–1989: Malcolm Frederick Graham
- 1989–2003: Edward George Ardis
- 2003–2007: Sue Patterson
- 2007–2012: vacant
- 2012–2013: Wendy Mary Callan
- 2013–2022: Alistair Grimason
- 2024-present: Diane Matchett
