= St. Crumnathy's Cathedral, Achonry =

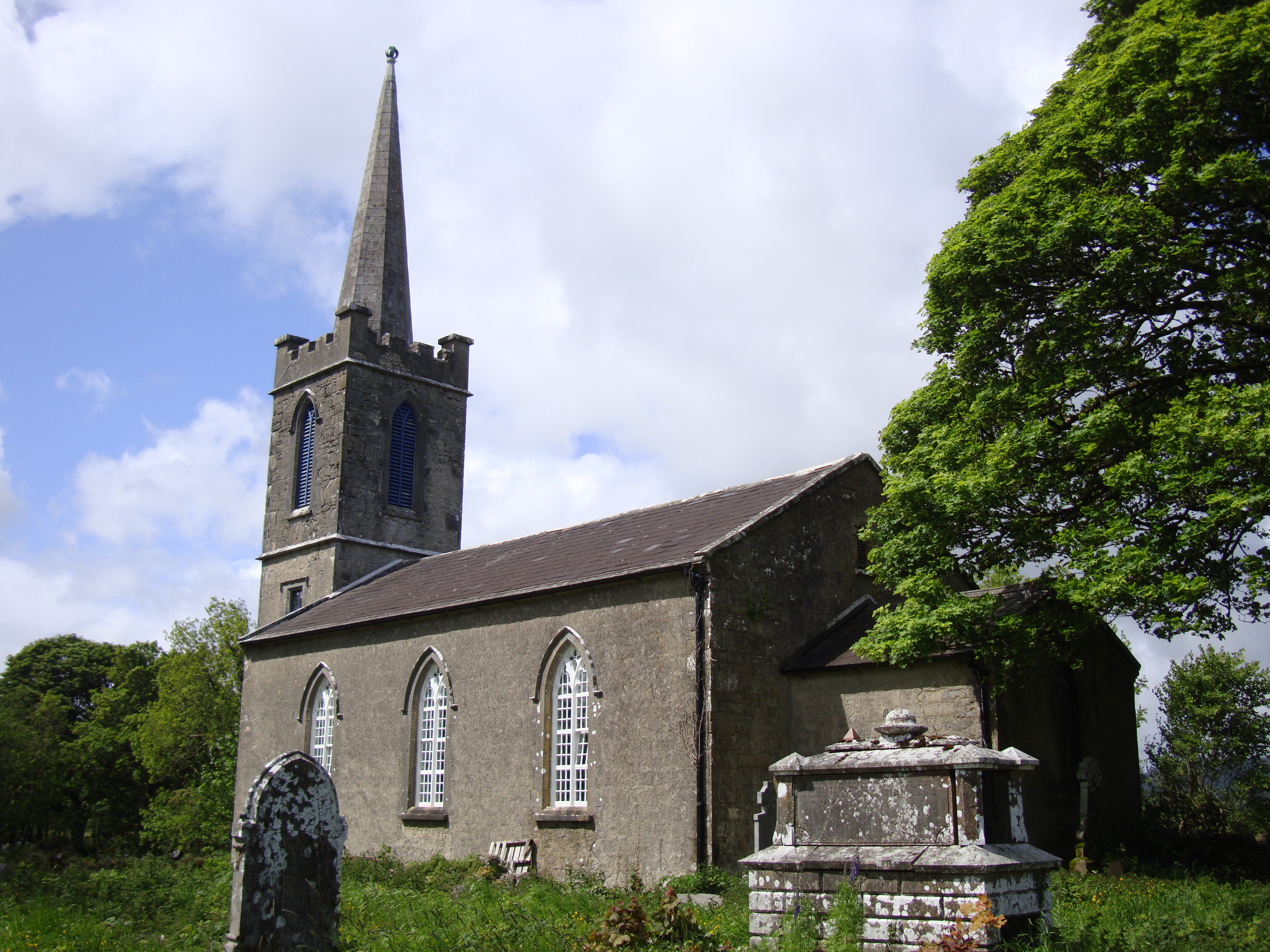
- Building exterior
- St. Crumnathy's Cathedral, Achonry
- 54°04′41″N 8°39′17″W
- Location: Achonry, County Sligo
- Country: Ireland
- Denomination: Church of Ireland

Administration
- Province: Province of Armagh
- Diocese: Diocese of Tuam, Killala and Achonry

St. Crumnathy's Cathedral is a former cathedral in Achonry in County Sligo, Ireland.

Dedicated to St Nathy, it was formerly in the Diocese of Achonry, and then the joint cathedral of Killala and Achonry. It was built in 1823, at a cost of £1066 with a grant from the Board of First Fruits, on the site of an earlier monastic settlement. It was one of three cathedrals in the Diocese of Tuam, Killala and Achonry until it was deconsecrated in 1998.

St. Crumnathy's Cathedral is a protected structure.
