= Bishop of Killala and Achonry =

Church of Ireland bishopric

The Bishop of Killala and Achonry was the Ordinary of the Church of Ireland diocese of Killala and Achonry in the Ecclesiastical Province of Tuam. The diocese comprised part of Counties Mayo and Sligo in Ireland.

The Episcopal see was a union of the bishoprics of Killala and Achonry which were united in 1622. Over the next two hundred and eleven years there were twenty-three bishops of the united diocese. Under the Church Temporalities (Ireland) Act 1833 (3 & 4 Will. 4. c. 37), Killala and Achonry were united to the archbishopric of Tuam in 1834. Following the death of Archbishop Trench in 1839, Tuam lost its metropolitan and archbishopric status and became the united bishopric of Tuam, Killala and Achonry in the Province of Armagh.

== List of Bishops of Killala and Achonry ==
Bishops of Killala and Achonry
| From | Until | Incumbent | Notes |
|---|---|---|---|
| 1623 | 1630 | Archibald Hamilton | Nominated 8 March 1623; consecrated 29 May 1623; translated to Cashel 20 April 1630 |
| 1630 | 1641 | Archibald Adair | Formerly Dean of Raphoe; nominated 23 November 1629 and consecrated 9 May 1630; deprived 18 May 1640, but subsequently was set aside; translated to Waterford and Lismore 13 July 1641 |
| 1641 | 1645 | John Maxwell | Formerly Bishop of Ross (Scotland); nominated 13 January and appointed by letters patent 26 February 1641; translated to Tuam 30 August 1645 |
| 1645 | 1661 | See vacant | |
| 1661 | 1663 | Henry Hall | Formerly Dean of Cork; nominated 7 August 1660 and consecrated 27 January 1661; died 19 July 1663 |
| 1664 | 1670 | Thomas Bayly | Formerly Dean of Down; nominated 17 December 1663 and consecrated 5 June 1664; died 20 July 1670 |
| 1671 | 1680 | Thomas Otway | Nominated 19 October 1670 and consecrated 29 January 1671; translated to Ossory 7 February 1680 |
| 1680 | 1681 | John Smith | Formerly Dean of Limerick; Nominated 6 January and appointed by letters patent 13 February 1680; died 2 March 1681 |
| 1681 | 1682 | William Smyth | Formerly Dean of Dromore; nominated 15 April and consecrated in June 1681; translated to Raphoe 17 February 1682 |
| 1682 | 1691 | Richard Tennison | Formerly Dean of Clogher; nominated 16 January and consecrated 19 February 1682; translated to Clogher 28 February 1691 |
| 1691 | 1716 | William Lloyd | Formerly Dean of Achonry; Nominated 7 December 1690 and consecrated 23 August 1691; died 11 December 1716 |
| 1717 | 1720 | Henry Downes | Nominated 24 January and consecrated 12 May 1717; translated to Elphin 12 May 1720 |
| 1720 | 1727 | Charles Cobbe | Formerly Dean of Ardagh; nominated 20 May and consecrated 14 August 1720; translated to Dromore 16 February 1727 |
| 1727 | 1730 | Robert Howard | Formerly Dean of Ardagh; nominated 14 January and consecrated 19 March 1727; translated to Elphin 13 January 1730 |
| 1730 | 1735 | Robert Clayton | Nominated 26 December 1729 and consecrated 10 May 1730; translated to Cork and Ross 19 December 1735 |
| 1735 | 1751 | Mordecai Cary | Translated from Clonfert; appointed by letters patent 20 December 1735; died 2 October 1751 |
| 1751 | 1759 | Richard Robinson | Nominated 31 October 1751 and consecrated 19 January 1752; translated to Ferns and Leighlin 19 April 1759 |
| 1759 | 1780 | Samuel Hutchinson | Formerly Dean of Dromore; nominated 27 March and consecrated 22 April 1759; died 27 October 1780 |
| 1781 | 1784 | William Cecil Pery | Formerly Dean of Derry; nominated 7 January and consecrated 18 February 1781; translated to Limerick, Ardfert and Aghadoe 13 May 1784 |
| 1784 | 1787 | William Preston | Nominated 13 October and consecrated 11 November 1784; translated to Ferns and Leighlin 9 November 1787 |
| 1787 | 1795 | John Law | Translated from Clonfert; nominated 10 September and appointed by letters patent 10 November 1787; translated to Elphin 27 March 1795 |
| 1795 | 1797 | John Porter | Nominated 6 May and consecrated 7 June 1795; translated to Clogher 30 December 1797 |
| 1798 | 1810 | Joseph Stock | Nominated 1 January and consecrated 28 January 1798; translated to Waterford and Lismore 1 May 1810 |
| 1810 | 1834 | James Verschoyle | Formerly Dean of St. Patrick's, Dublin; nominated 12 April and consecrated 6 May 1810; died 13 April 1834 |
In 1834, Killala and Achonry became part of the archbishopric of Tuam. In 1839, Tuam lost its metropolitan and archbishopric status and became the united bishopric of Tuam, Killala and Achonry
