= Archdeacon of Killala =

Ecclesiastical position in the former Killala Diocese, Ireland

Province of Armagh
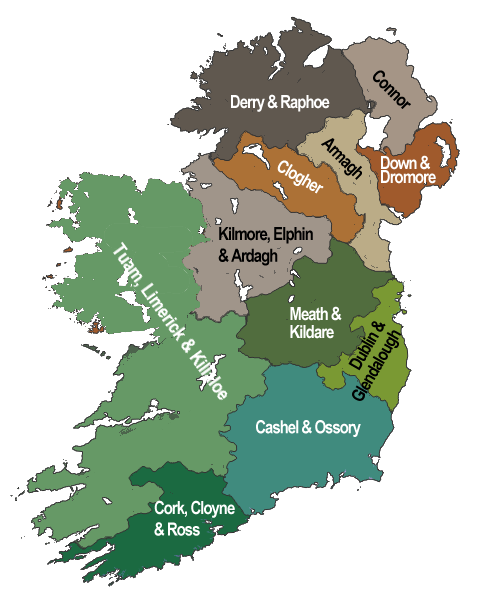
- Church: Church of Ireland
- Metropolitan bishop: Archbishop of Armagh
- Cathedral: St Patrick's Cathedral, Armagh (Church of Ireland)
- Dioceses: 7

The Archdeacon of Killala was a senior ecclesiastical officer within the Diocese of Killala until 1622;Killala and Achonry from 1622 until 1834; and of Tuam, Killala and Achonry from 1834, although it has now been combined to include the area formerly served by the Archdeacon of Achonry As such he was responsible for the disciplinary supervision of the clergy within his portion of the diocese. within the diocese. The archdeaconry can trace its history back to Isaac O'Maolfoghmhair, who died in 1235. to the last discrete incumbent William Colvin.
