= Joseph Bourke, 3rd Earl of Mayo =

Irish peer and Church of Ireland bishop (1736–1794)

The Right Reverend and Right Honourable The Earl of Mayo PC (Ire)
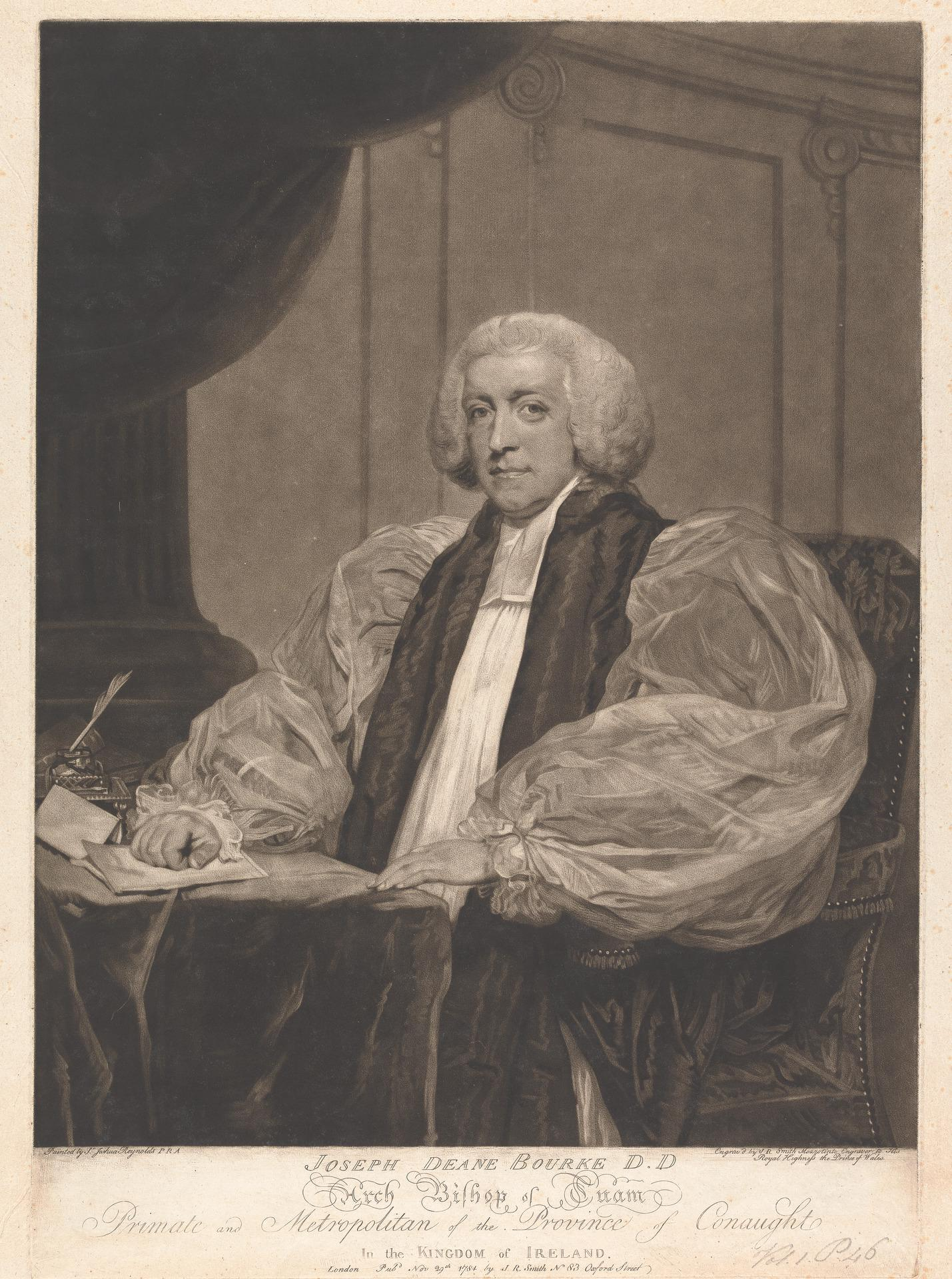

Archbishop of Tuam
- In office 1782–1794
- Preceded by: Jemmett Browne
- Succeeded by: William Beresford

Bishop of Ferns and Leighlin
- In office 1772–1782
- Preceded by: Edward Young
- Succeeded by: Walter Cope

Dean of Dromore
- In office 1772–1772
- Preceded by: Walter Cope
- Succeeded by: Raphael Walsh

Dean of Killaloe
- In office 1768–1772
- Preceded by: William Henry
- Succeeded by: William Pery
Parliamentary Offices
Member of the Irish House of Lords
Hereditary Peerage; 20 April 1792 – 20 August 1794
Preceded by	John Bourke
Succeeded by	John Bourke

Personal details
- Born: Joseph Deane Bourke; 1736
- Died: 20 August 1794 (aged 57–58) Kilbeggan, County Westmeath, Ireland
- Spouse: Elizabeth Meade (m. 1760–1794)
- Children: John Bourke, 4th Earl of Mayo; Richard Bourke
- Parents: John Bourke, 1st Earl of Mayo; Mary Deane

Joseph Deane Bourke, 3rd Earl of Mayo (English: /bɜːrk/; BURK; 1736 – 20 August 1794) was an Irish peer and cleric who held several high offices in the Church of Ireland including Bishop of Ferns and Leighlin (1772–82) and Archbishop of Tuam (1782–94).

== Family ==
Bourke was the second son of John Bourke, 1st Earl of Mayo and Mary Deane. In 1760, he married Elizabeth Meade (d.1807), the daughter of Richard Meade, 3rd Baronet and Catherine Prittie. They had four sons: John Bourke, 4th Earl of Mayo, Richard, Joseph, and George, and six daughters: Catherine, Mary-Elizabeth, Mary-Anne, Charlotte, Louisa, and Theodosia-Eleanor. Theodosia's son, Matthew Hale, was the first Bishop of Perth and then the Bishop of Brisbane.

== Ecclesiastical career ==
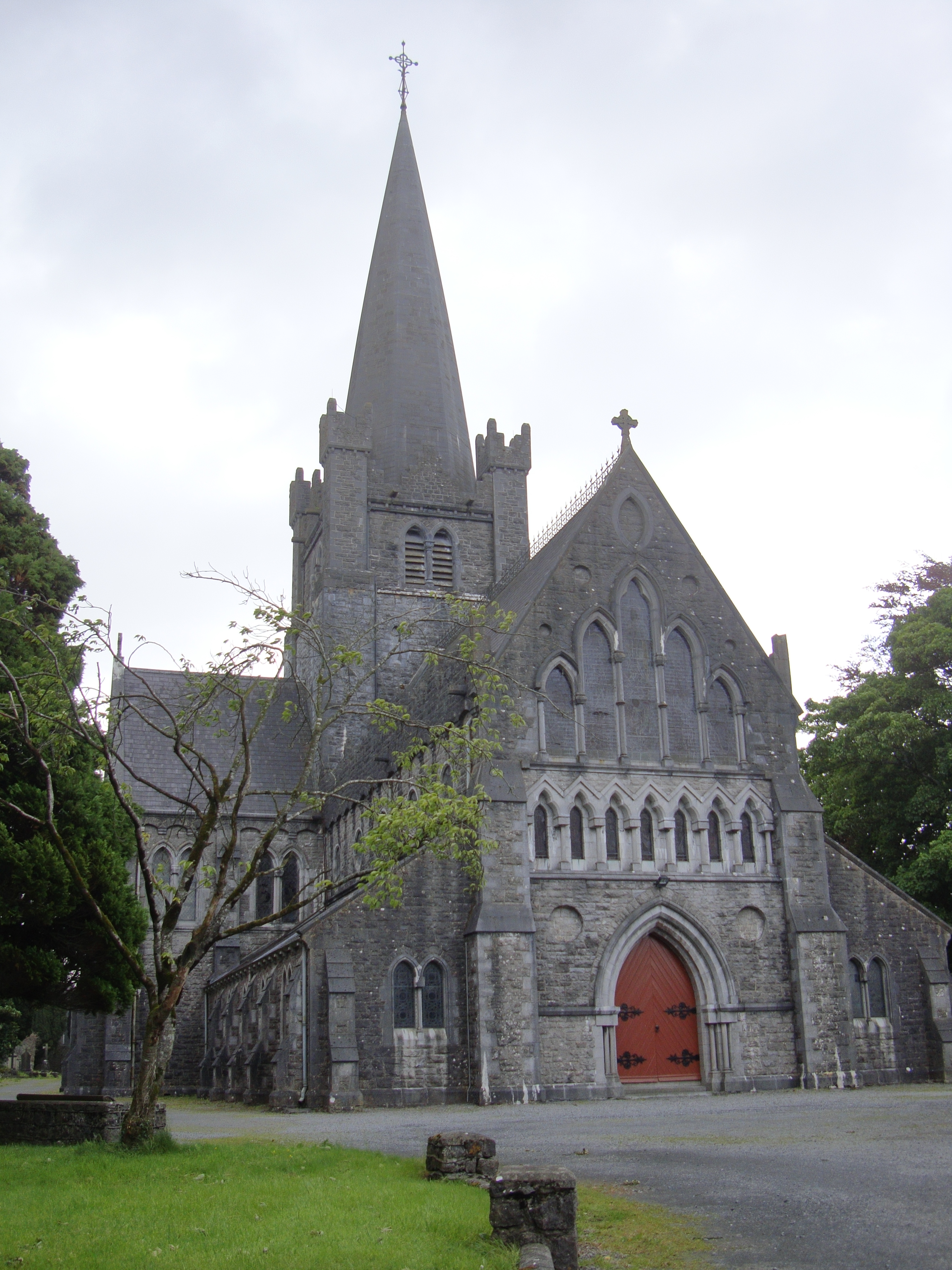
Cathedral Church of St Mary, Tuam.

Prior to his elevation to the episcopate, Bourke's earlier ecclesiastical appointments were Prebendary of Armagh (1760–1768); Dean of Killaloe (1768–1772), Rector of Kilskyre, near Kells, County Meath (1769–1772); and Dean of Dromore (1772).

He was nominated as the Bishop of Ferns and Leighlin on 7 September 1772 and appointed by letters patent on 19 September 1772. He was consecrated at St. Thomas's Church, Dublin on 11 October 1772; the principal consecrator was John Cradock, Archbishop of Dublin, and the principal co-consecrators were Charles Jackson, Bishop of Kildare and William Newcome, Bishop of Dromore.

Ten years later, he was translated to the Archbishopric of Tuam by letters patent on 8 August 1782 and made a member of the Privy Council of Ireland. On the death in 1792 of his brother, John Bourke, 2nd Earl of Mayo, he succeeded as the 3rd Earl of Mayo.

He died at Kilbeggan in County Westmeath on 20 August 1794, and was interred in the burying ground of his family near Naas, County Kildare.

== Arms ==
Coat of arms of Joseph Bourke, 3rd Earl of Mayo
Crest A Cat-a-Mountain sejant guardant proper, collared and chained Or. Escutcheon Party per fess Or and Ermine, a cross gules the first quarter charged with a lion rampant sable and the second with a dexter hand couped at the wrist and erect gules Supporters On either side a Chevalier in complete Armour, holding in the exterior hand a Pole-Axe, all proper. Motto A CRUCE SALUS (Salvation from the Cross)

== Ancestry ==
Ancestors of Joseph Bourke, 3rd Earl of Mayo

8. John Bourke
4. Richard Bourke
9. Catherine Fay
2. John Bourke, 1st Earl of Mayo
10. Charles Minchin
5. Catherine Minchin
11. Elizabeth Paulet
1. Joseph Bourke, 3rd Earl of Mayo
12. Joseph Deane of Deanehill
6. Joseph Deane
13. Elizabeth Parker
3. Mary Deane
14. Colonel Henry Boyle
7. Margaret Boyle
15. Lady Mary O'Brien

== See also ==
- House of Burgh, an Anglo-Norman and Hiberno-Norman dynasty founded in 1193
- Church of Ireland

Church of Ireland titles
Preceded by William Henry	Dean of Killaloe; 1768–1772	Succeeded by William Pery
Preceded by Walter Cope	Dean of Dromore; 1772	Succeeded by Raphael Walsh
Preceded by Edward Young	Bishop of Ferns and Leighlin; 1772–1782	Succeeded by Walter Cope
Preceded by Jemmett Browne	Archbishop of Tuam; 1782–1794	Succeeded by William Beresford
Peerage of Ireland
Preceded by John Bourke	Earl of Mayo; 1792–1794	Succeeded by John Bourke
