= Archdiocese of Tuam (Church of Ireland) =

The Archbishopric of Tuam existed from the mid twelfth century until 1839, with its seat at Tuam.

St Jarlath (c. 445–540) is considered to have founded Tuam as the seat of a bishop in about 501, and he stands first in the list of bishops of Tuam. However, the names of only two other bishops are recorded before the eleventh century, Ferdomnach (died 781) and Eugene mac Clerig (died 969).

Tuam achieved a new importance after it became the seat of the O'Connor High Kings of Ireland in the early 11th century. The O'Connors had previously been based at Cruachain, County Roscommon. The first St Mary's Cathedral on the present site was begun in the 12th century, when Turlough O'Connor (1088–1156) was High King. This marked Tuam's becoming the seat of an archbishop, following the Synod of Kells of 1152.

With the Reformation, the new Church of Ireland established its own archdiocese, which was separate from the authority of the Pope. This archdiocese became the central part of the new Province of Tuam, an ecclesiastical province of the Church of Ireland, so continuing until the nineteenth century. In 1839, on the death of the last archbishop, Dr Power Trench, Tuam lost its metropolitan status, as a consequence of the Church Temporalities Act, and united with the see of Killala and Achonry. At the same time, the diocese of Ardagh was separated from it and united with Kilmore.

The former Ecclesiastical province of Tuam now forms part of the Church of Ireland Diocese of Tuam, Limerick and Killaloe in the Province of Dublin.

== Church of Ireland archbishops of Tuam ==
The following is a basic list of the Church of Ireland archbishops of Tuam.

- 1514-1536: Thomas O'Mullaly
- 1537-1572: Christopher Bodkin
- 1572-1595: William O'Mullally
- 1595-1609: Nehemiah Donnellan
- 1609-1628: William Daniel
- 1629-1638: Randolph Barlow
- 1638-1645: Richard Boyle
- 1645-1647: John Maxwell
- 1647-1660: See vacant
- 1660-1667: Samuel Pullen
- 1667-1679: John Parker
- 1679-1716: John Vesey
- 1716-1741: Edward Synge
- 1742-1751: Josiah Hort
- 1752-1775: John Ryder
- 1775-1782: Jemmett Browne
- 1782-1794: Joseph Deane Bourke
- 1794-1819: William Beresford
- 1819-1839: Power Le Poer Trench

== Loss of metropolitan status ==
The Church Temporalities (Ireland) Act 1833 (3 & 4 Will. 4. c. 37) combined the Church of Ireland Archdiocese of Tuam with the Diocese of Killala and Achonry on 13 April 1834. However, Tuam retained its metropolitan status until the death of the incumbent Archbishop, Dr William Power Le Poer Trench, in 1839.

== See also ==
- Archdiocese of Tuam (Roman Catholic)
- Diocese of Tuam, Killala and Achonry
- Dean of Tuam
- Archdeacon of Tuam
