= John Maxwell (bishop) =

Scottish archbishop (died 1647)

The Right Reverend John Maxwell
- Archbishop of Tuam
- Church: Church of Ireland / Church of Scotland
- See: Church of Ireland Archdiocese of Tuam
- In office: 1645–1647
- Predecessor: Richard Boyle
- Previous posts: Bishop of Ross (1633–1638); Bishop of Killala and Achonry (1640–1645)

Personal details
- Born: On or before 1586 Kirkcudbrightshire, Galloway, Scotland
- Died: 14 February 1647 Ireland

John Maxwell (1591–1647), was a Protestant clergyman serving the Church of Scotland and Church of Ireland as Archbishop of Tuam.

== Early life ==
He was born in 1591 the son of John Maxwell of Cavens, Kirkcudbrightshire, was born in or before 1586. He was educated at the University of St Andrews, where he graduated M. A. on 29 July 1611.

== Early career ==
In 1615, he ordained as Church of Scotland minister of Mortlach, Banffshire. He translated in 1622 to High Kirk parish in St Giles in Edinburgh, where he successively held two of the four parishes contained within the church: High Kirk and Old Kirk. On 18 July 1622, he was elected by the town council to the charge of the New or High Church; on 14 December, he was elected by the town council to the second charge in the Old Church, or St Giles' Old Church, and admitted on 27 January 1626. He left in 1630 to take position as Bishop of Ross.

Maxwell was able to achieve influence at court through his cousin, James Maxwell of Innerwick (afterwards Earl of Dirleton). In 1629, by command of Charles I, he waited on William Laud, Archbishop of Canterbury, to explain the views of the Scottish hierarchy in reference to a Book of Common Prayer. Archbishop Laud and King Charles were in favour of bringing the Anglican prayer-book into use throughout the three kingdoms. Maxwell reported that the Scottish bishops believed there would be less opposition to a service-book framed in Scotland, though on the English model.

In 1630, Maxwell was in correspondence with Henry Leslie, then dean of Down, about the presbyterian irregularities of Robert Blair, and other Scottish clergymen who had migrated to the north of Ireland. He carried to the court an account, derived from Leslie, of Blair's alleged teaching respecting physical convulsions as requisites of religious revival. In consequence of this report, Robert Echlin, Bishop of Down and Connor, suspended Blair in 1631, and deposed him and his friends in 1632.

== Bishop of Ross ==
Maxwell, according to Blair's sarcasm, "was then gaping for a bishopric". He was raised to the bishopric of Ross on 26 April 1633, and consecrated between 15 June and 18 July following, while Charles was in Scotland. The king granted him on, 19 March 1634, a yearly pension of 166l., adding on 20 October 1634, a grant of the priory of Beauly, Inverness-shire, and on 26 July 1636, a mortification of certain kirks and chaplaincies. He was also made a privy councillor, and in 1636 an extraordinary lord of session.

It is conjectured that Maxwell took part in the compilation of the "canons and constitutions ecclesiastical", authorised by the king in 1635 and published in 1636. In conjunction with James Wedderburn, Bishop of Dunblane, he certainly had a chief hand in drawing up the new service-book for Scotland, subsequently revised by Laud, Juxon, and Wren. On its introduction by order (13 June 1637) of the Scottish privy council, Maxwell at once brought it into use in his cathedral at Fortrose. In December 1637, in consequence of the opposition to the service-book, the privy council sent the lord high treasurer (John Stewart, 1st Earl of Traquair) to London for instructions. Traquair urged that the service-book be withdrawn. Laud would have had him superseded as Lord High Treasurer by Maxwell.

The service-book was in use at Fortrose till 11 March 1638, when

"certane scolleris cam pertlie in to the kirk and took wp thir haill seruice bookis, and careit them doun to the Ness with ane coill of fyre, thair to haue brynt them altogidder. Bot there fell out ane suddant schour, that befoir thay culd wyn to the Ness the coill wes drounit out. The scolleris seing this, thay rave thame all in blaidis, dispytfullie, and kest them in the sea".

Maxwell preached a short sermon without common prayer, took horse, rode south in disguise, and went straight to London to the king.

In November 1638, on the eve of the meeting of the General Assembly at Glasgow, he was at Hamilton, with Walter Whiteford, Bishop of Brechin. He was one of the six prelates who signed the declinature addressed to the general assembly, and on this and other grounds was deposed and excommunicated (13 December) by the assembly, the same assembly which abolished Episcopacy in the Kingdom of Scotland. Maxwell was charged with bowing to the altar, wearing cope and rochet, using "the English liturgy" for the past two years in his house and cathedral, ordaining deacons, giving absolution, fasting on Friday, and travelling and card-playing on Sunday. His accusers described him as "a perfect pattern of a proud prelate".

== Irish career ==
In August 1639, Maxwell and five other bishops signed a protestation against the General Assembly as unlawful, and appealing to an assembly of the clergy lawfully convened, though it did not lead to the return of Scottish bishoprics. Charles proposed to confer on Maxwell the bishopric of Elphin, but Wentworth had promised it to Henry Tilson. The day after the death (26 November 1639) of Archbishop John Spottiswood, Maxwell, in terms of the deceased primate's will, gave the manuscript of his history into the king's own hand at Whitehall. Spottiswood had made Maxwell his executor, and recommended him as his successor in the Primacy (i.e. as Archbishop of St Andrews).

In 1640, Maxwell went over to Ireland, where he was made D. D. by Trinity College, Dublin, and appointed on 12 October 1640, Bishop of Killala and Achonry by royal patent, in room of Archibald Adair, deprived 18 May for favouring the covenant. According to Patrick Adair, Maxwell came "in a disguised habit" to Raphoe, County Donegal, "about a fortnight before the rebellion" of 1641. Here, with Bishops Henry Leslie and John Leslie, he conferred with John O'Cullenan, Roman Catholic Bishop of Raphoe. On the outbreak of the rebellion he was driven by the rebels from his palace at Killala, County Mayo. Fleeing with his wife, three children, and neighbours, the company, numbering about a hundred, was attacked at the bridge of Shruel, County Mayo, when several were killed and the bishop stripped, wounded, and left for dead.

Rescued by Barnabas O'Brien, 6th Earl of Thomond, he took refuge in the town of Galway, but the townsmen rose against the garrison, and his life was again in peril. He removed to Dublin, where he encouraged his friends by his zealous preaching. Ultimately he made his way to the king at Oxford and acted as royal chaplain. On 30 August 1645 he was appointed to the archbishopric of Tuam, in succession to Richard Boyle. He returned to Dublin, and in August 1646 signed the address of thanks by eighty Dublin divines to Ormonde, the Lord-Lieutenant, for the protection he had accorded them in the use of the prayer-book. In the meantime, Samuel Rutherford published his 1644 Lex, Rex, which argued against the bishop's conception of royal authority.

== Death and family ==
When the news reached him at Dublin of the surrender of Charles by the Scottish army (30 January 1647), he retired to his closet and was found dead on his knees on 14 February 1647. His age was about 55. He was buried in Christ Church Cathedral. He married Elizabeth Innes, by whom he had four sons, John, David, James, and Robert, and five daughters, Anne, Janet, Elizabeth, Rachel, and Bethia. Archbishop Maxwell left a great many writings of religious and political nature.

Religious titles
Preceded by Patrick Lindsay	Bishop of Ross; 1633–1638	Episcopacy abolished in Scotland; First bishop after Restoration: John Paterson
Preceded by Archibald Adair	Bishop of Killala and Achonry; 1640–1645	Vacant Title next held by Henry Hall
Preceded by Richard Boyle	Archbishop of Tuam; 1645–1647	Vacant Title next held by Samuel Pullen
