= Abraham Dawson (Dean of Dromore) =

Dean of Dromore

Abraham Dawson was the dean of Dromore Cathedral from 1894 until his death on 20 November 1905.

The son of a doctor, he was born in Dungannon in 1826 and educated at the Royal School Dungannon and Trinity College Dublin from 1844. He was ordained in 1851 and began his career at Christ Church, Belfast. After being rector of Knocknamuckley (1857) and Seagoe (1879) parishes, he became rural dean of Dromore in 1886, and its archdeacon in 1892.

He is buried with his family in Knocknamuckley graveyard.

== Notes ==
Church of Ireland titles
Preceded by Theophilus Campbell	Dean of Dromore; 1894–1905	Succeeded by Robert O'Loughlin
