= William Pery, 1st Baron Glentworth =

William Cecil Pery, 1st Baron Glentworth (26 July 1721 – 4 July 1794) was an 18th-century Anglican bishop in Ireland.

== Biography ==
He was born on 26 July 1721, the son of Reverend Stackpole Pery and Jane Twigg, daughter of William Twigg, Archdeacon of Limerick, and educated at Trinity College, Dublin. His elder brother was Edmund Pery, 1st Viscount Pery and younger sister was Lucy Hartstonge the founder of what is now St John's Hospital.

He was Dean of Killaloe (1772–1780) and then Derry. Pery was nominated Bishop of Killala and Achonry on 7 January 1781 and consecrated on 18 February that year. He was translated to Limerick, Ardfert and Aghadoe on 13 May 1784. He was created Baron Glentworth, of Mallow in the Peerage of Ireland, in 1790 and died on 4 July 1794. William Street in Limerick is named after him, as were Cecil Street, Glentworth Street and Mallow Street.

Pery firstly married Jane Walcott, daughter of John Minchin Walcott, and following her death, married secondly Dorothea Lewis, daughter of William Lewis, Archdeacon of Kilfenora. He was succeeded in his title by his son, Edmund Pery, who was later made Earl of Limerick. His daughter, Hon. Eleanor Pery, married Sir Vere Hunt, 1st Baronet. She died in 1821.

Church of England titles
Preceded by Joseph Bourke	Dean of Killaloe; 1772–1780	Succeeded by Samuel Rastall
Preceded by Thomas Barnard	Dean of Derry; 1780–1781	Succeeded by Edward Emily
Preceded by Samuel Hutchinson	Bishop of Killala and Achonry; 1781–1784	Succeeded by William Preston
Preceded by William Gore	Bishop of Limerick, Ardfert and Aghadoe; 1772–1784	Succeeded by Thomas Barnard
Peerage of Ireland
New creation	Baron Glentworth; 1790–1794	Succeeded by Edmund Pery
