= John Oswald (bishop) =

18th-century Irish bishop

John Oswald was an 18th-century Anglican bishop in Ireland.

He was nominated Bishop of Clonfert and Kilmacduagh on 1 April 1762 and consecrated on 4 July that year; translated to Dromore on 7 May 1763; and finally to Raphoe on 25 August 1763. He died on 4 March 1780.

Church of England titles
Preceded by William Gore (bishop)	Bishop of Clonfert and Kilmacduagh; 1762–1763	Succeeded by Denison Cumberland
Preceded by George Marlay	Bishop of Dromore; May 1763– August 1763	Succeeded by Edward Young
Preceded by Robert Downes	Bishop of Raphoe; 1772– 1784	Succeeded by James Hawkins
