= St Mary's Cathedral, Tuam =

Church of Ireland cathedral

- Cathedral Church of St Mary, Tuam
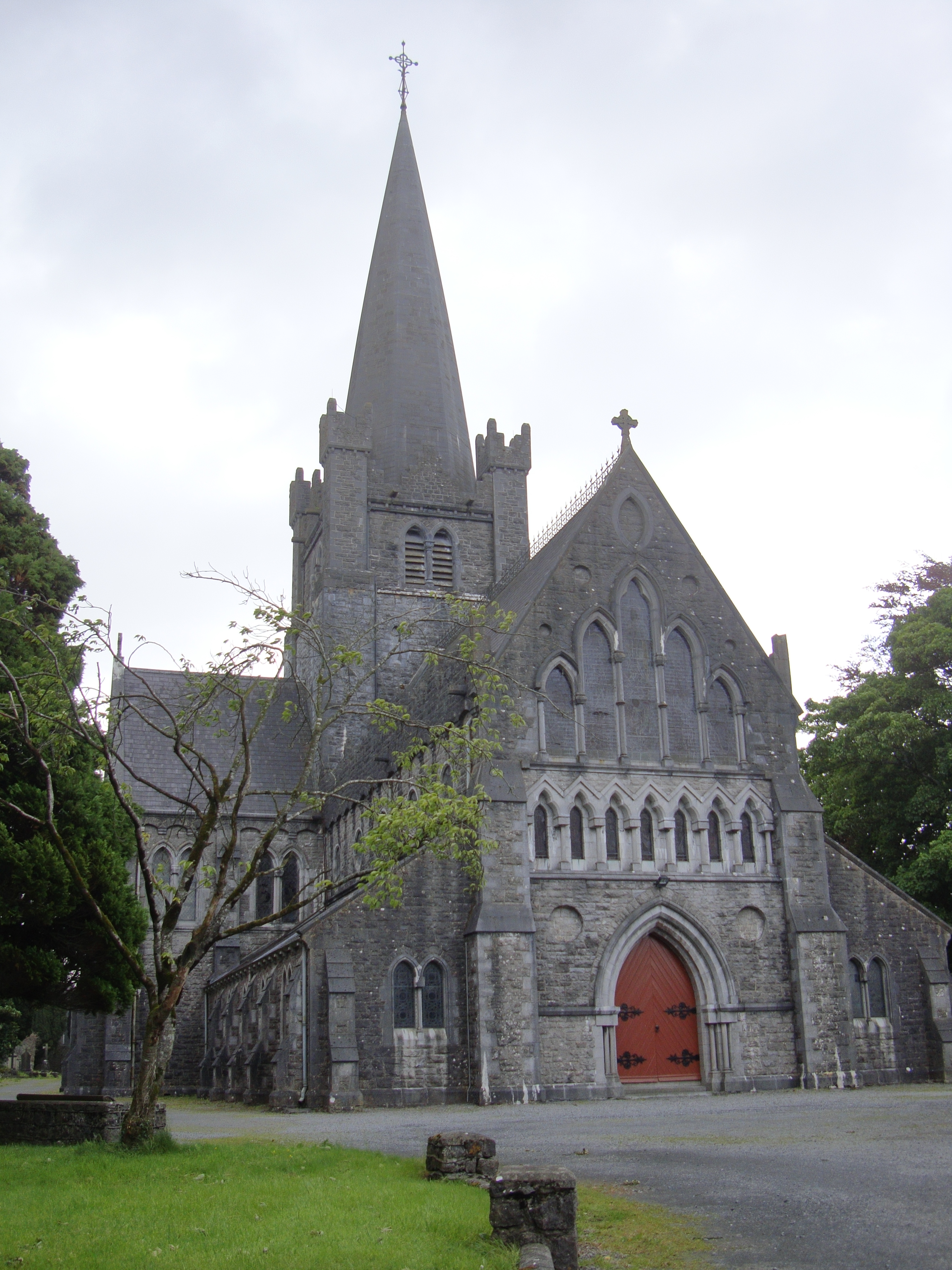
- Exterior of St Mary's Cathedral
- St Mary's Cathedral, Tuam
- 53°30′50″N 08°51′18″W
- Country: Ireland
- Denomination: Church of Ireland

History
- Dedication: Mary, mother of Jesus
- Consecrated: 9 October 1878

Architecture
- Architect: Sir Thomas Newenham Deane
- Style: Irish pointed
- Groundbreaking: 1861
- Completed: 1878

Specifications
- Length: 46 metres (151 feet)
- Width: 23 metres (75 feet)

Administration
- Province: Dublin
- Diocese: Tuam, Limerick and Killaloe

Clergy
- Bishop: The Right Reverend Michael Burrows
- Dean: The Very Reverend A.J. Grimason

St Mary's Cathedral (Irish: Ard-Eaglais Mhuire) is a cathedral church of the Diocese of Tuam, Limerick and Killaloe in the Church of Ireland. It is located in Tuam, County Galway, in Ireland. From the 12th century until 1839, both before and after the Reformation, it was the seat of the former Archdiocese of Tuam. Most of the present structure dates from the 1870s, but parts of earlier 12th- and 14th-century structures survive within.

== Origins ==
The founder and first bishop of Tuam is considered to be St Jarlath, who founded the church about 501. The traditional date of his death is 540. However, the names of only two other bishops of Tuam are recorded before the 11th century, Ferdomnach (died 781) and Eugene mac Clerig (died 969).

The medieval importance of Tuam was chiefly the result of its becoming the seat of the O'Connor High Kings of Ireland in the early 11th century. The O'Connors had previously been based at Cruachain, County Roscommon.

The first cathedral on the present site was begun in the 12th century, when Turlough O'Connor (1088–1156) was High King. This marked the establishment of Tuam as the seat of an archbishop, an event which followed the Synod of Kells of 1152.

The first cathedral lasted only a few years and was destroyed by fire in 1184, recorded thus in the Annals of Lough Cé: "The great church of Tuam-da-Ghualann fell in one day, both roof and stone". After this, no rebuilding was attempted for some one hundred years, except that in the 13th century a small parish church was built on the site of an old monastery. This long delay was largely the result of the Norman invasion of Ireland, which left the city of Tuam in ruins.

In the 14th century, a second St Mary's Cathedral was begun, a little to the east of the original building and incorporating into its entrance the remains of the 12th-century chancel and sanctuary.

== Present cathedral ==
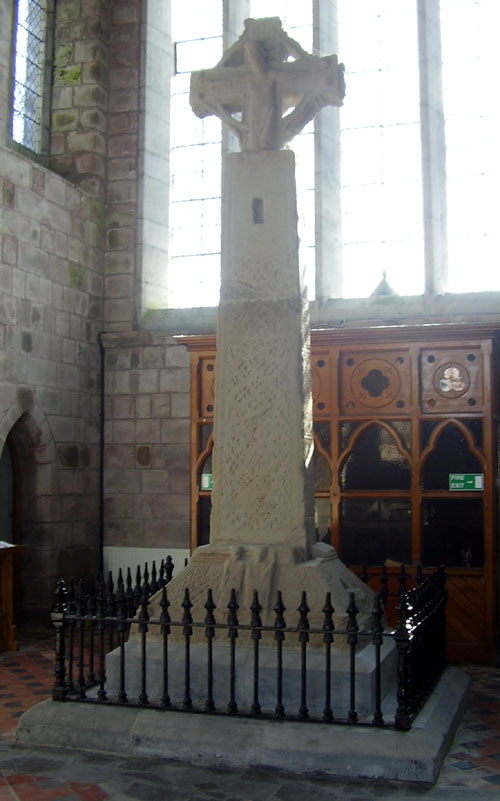
The High Cross of Tuam

With the coming of the railway to Tuam in 1861, and the enlargement of the garrison, the town's Anglican population increased and this led to the building of a third cathedral on the site, designed by the architect Sir Thomas Newenham Deane, which was begun in about 1861 and completed in 1878. Charles James Seymour was the Dean at the time. The new or third cathedral was built on the site of the first cathedral and incorporated the Hiberno-Romanesque Arch, while the second de Burgo cathedral became the Diocesan Synod Hall, Library and Registry. The cathedral was consecrated on 9 October 1878, with Robert Gregg, Bishop of Cork, as preacher. The funding for this rebuilding was helped by the combination of Church of Ireland dioceses into the new Diocese of Tuam, Killala and Achonry in 1839.

The style is Irish pointed. The building is 46 metres (150 feet) long, and the transepts 23 metres (75 feet) wide. The oak reredos is taken from St. Columb's Cathedral Church, Derry. The chancel chairs were presented by Henry Browne, 5th Marquess of Sligo. The present sanctuary floor was quarried at the Merlin Quarries, Galway. The Bishop's Throne, the Pulpit, the Font and the Chapter Stalls were made of Caen stone and Irish marble. The original organ, which has been rebuilt, was the gift of Archbishop Josiah Hort in 1742. At the south west end of the cathedral is a portion of an ancient Irish Cross.

The Synod Hall stalls are reputed to have been in a Piedmontese monastery, and brought to Ireland by Edward Joshua Cooper, M.P., of Markree Castle, County Sligo, and were later presented to St. Mary's Cathedral.

The present-day cathedral contains a Romanesque 12th-century chancel-arch which has been called "the finest example of Hiberno-Romanesque architecture now extant". It also contains the High Cross of Tuam, a national monument which was moved to its present site in 1992, and a significant part of the 14th-century cathedral. In the south aisle, the ornamented shaft of another high cross dating from the late 12th century survives, while the choir stalls are Italian baroque and date from about 1740. The incorporation of these older structures was contrary to the wishes of Sir Thomas Deane. The High Cross of Tuam was erected in the 12th century by Turlough O'Connor to mark the completion of the first cathedral and the appointment of the first Archbishop of Tuam.

The stained glass west window, depicting the Transfiguration of our Lord, dates from 1913 and is very fine. Other smaller windows show figures from the Old Testament, Moses, David, Solomon, Ezra, Malachi, and John the Baptist, and a window depicting Christ the King was installed in memory of Deane, the cathedral's architect.

Some major renovations took place between 1985 and 1993, and a new central heating system was added in September 2000. The cathedral is open to visitors on Fridays (morning and afternoon) during the summer months.

== Chancel arch ==
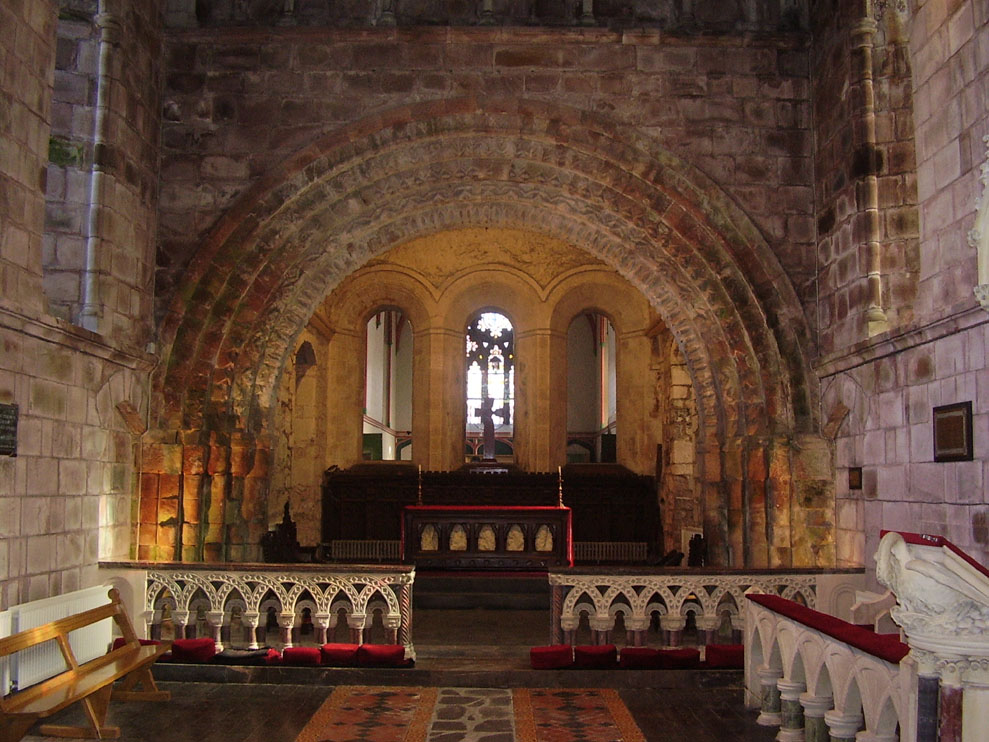
12th-century red sandstone chancel arch in Irish Romanesque style

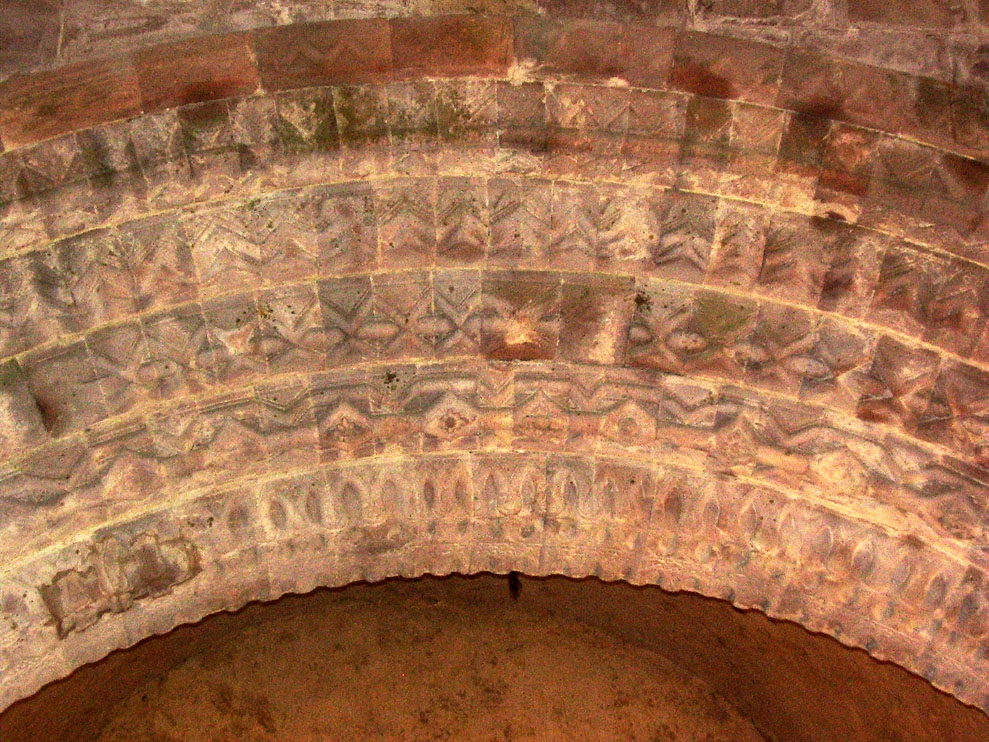
Closeup of the chancel arch

The 12th-century Hiberno-Romanesque Triumphal Arch is one of the outstanding features of St Mary's Cathedral, Tuam. It is the only remaining part of the original cathedral, erected at this site during the reign of Turlough O'Connor.

The Nave of O’Connor's cathedral collapsed in 1184 due to a fire, with only the stone chancel arch escaping. In the 14th century a new cathedral was built by the De Burgo family, but to the east of the old building, with the chancel arch becoming the entrance to the new cathedral. The chancel arch was blocked up by a stone-and-wooden structure, in the centre of which was placed a door. This structure remained in place for over 500 years. Thus, the chancel arch was exposed to the elements for this period, and it is remarkable that it has remained in such a good state of preservation. It was not until the 19th century that it became once again the chancel of the present cathedral.

The rounded chancel arch is Hiberno-Romanesque in style, and is built of red sandstone. As there is no keystone in the arch, the columns supporting the capitals of the arch have a slight inward inclination to bear and support the tremendous weight of the whole structure. This means that the columns are not perpendicular, so that the space at the base of the supporting columns is wider than at the capitals. The arch which is perfectly circular, is 6.85 metres (22.5 feet) wide at the base and 4.88 metres (16 feet) high from the ground. It consists of six consecutive semi-circular arches of elaborately ornamented stonework supported on columns, which with the exception of the outside one, on each side, are semi-circular and not ornamented. The capitals are richly sculptured with a variety of interlaced traceries, something similar to those on the base of the High Cross in the Square. There are carved grotesque faces on the jambs.

In the judgement of antiquary, Dr. George Petrie, "The Ancient Church of Tuam, was not only a larger but more splendid structure than Cormac's Church at Cashel, and not unworthy of the powerful Monarch to whom it chiefly owes its erection." In looking at the arch one is indeed so impressed by its dignity and beauty, that one is given a real vision of what the ancient cathedral must have been in its original glory and splendour – one of the outstanding cathedrals of its period in Western Europe.

== The communion silver ==
The earliest pieces of the Communion silver date from the reign of Charles II. During the Cromwellian period, the earlier silver apparently disappeared from Tuam, as occurred in many places, but reappeared later.

The present set of silver used in the cathedral is composed of six pieces. Four of the items are pre-1700, but the inscription on two of the items seems to point to a later date.

The two oldest pieces are a chalice and a paten. The chalice bears the inscription, Ex dono Revernd mi Patris in Christo Sam Providentia Divina Tuamensis Archieppi & Feneborensis Epis Conaecieq Metropolitani. Its dimensions are 10 inches high and 5 inches diameter. The paten, the surface of which is quite scratched, has the inscription, "Sam Tuamensis", and measures 7.5 inches in diameter. Neither piece is hallmarked. These two items date from the Archbishopric of Samuel Pullen (c. 1660 – 1666).

Both the second chalice and the paten are hallmarked and bear the inscription, Ecclesiae Cathedralis Stae Mariae Tuamensis 1678. The dimensions of the chalice are 10 inches high with a diameter of 5.5 inches, with the paten measuring 7.5 inches in diameter. There is also a cover for the chalice. These two items date from the Archbishopric of John Vesey (c. 1678 – 1716),

There are also two flagons with a similar inscription, Ex dono Viri Venerabilis Honorabilis Thoma Vesey, Episcopi Laonensis Equitis Aurati quondam Archdiaconi Tuamensis in Usum Ecclesiac Cathedralis do Tuam & Gloriam SS & Individuae Trinitatis. These hallmarked flagons are 10 inches high and 7 inches in diameter. One flagon is in good order but the other is somewhat damaged.

== Burials ==
- Nehemiah Donnellan
- William Daniel
- Samuel Pullen
- Jemmett Browne
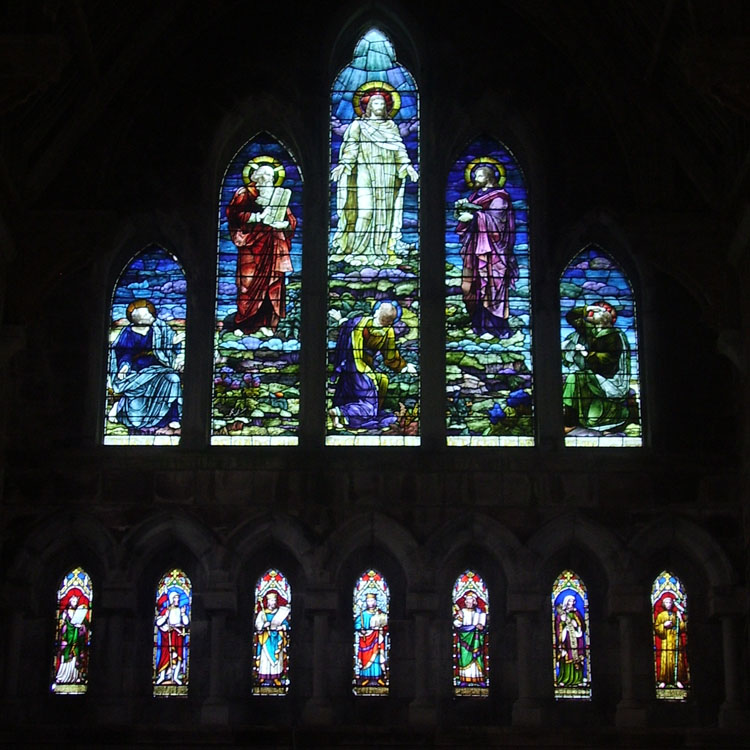
West window depicting the Transfiguration of Our Lord

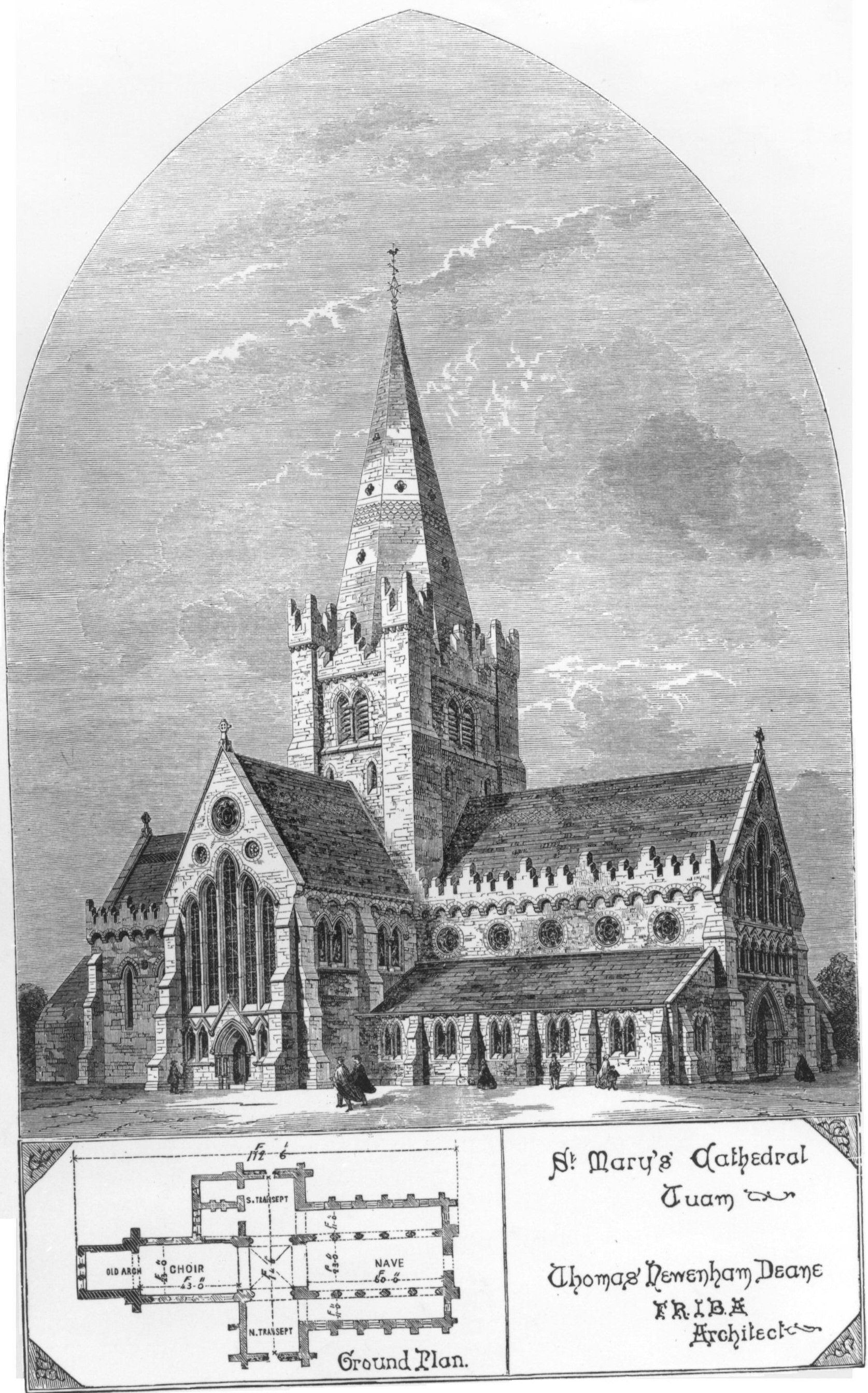
19th-century engraving by Deane

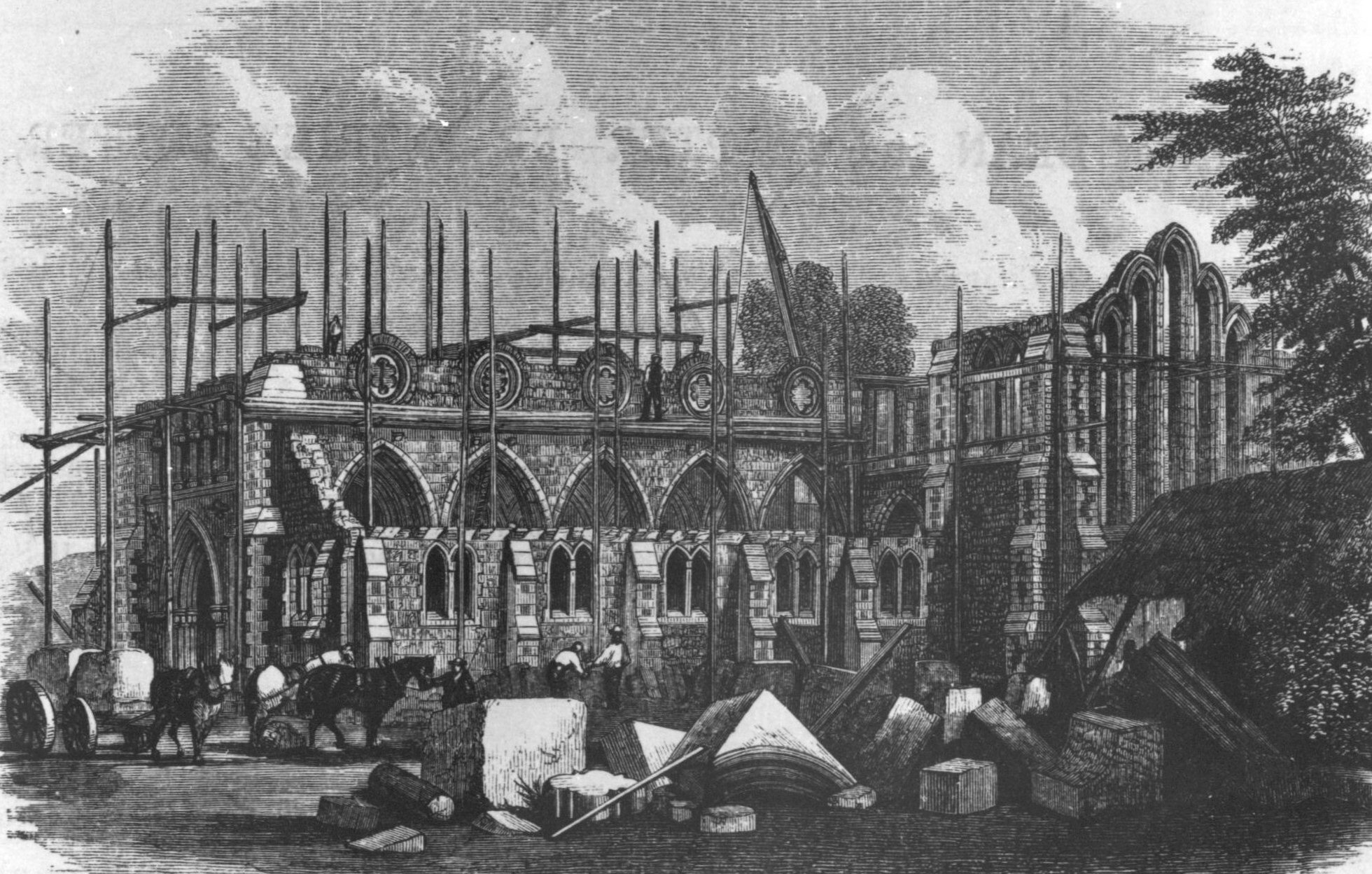
Reconstruction under way in 1865

== See also ==
- Dean of Tuam
- List of cathedrals in Ireland

== Bibliography ==
- Higgins, Jim, and Parsons, Aisling (eds.) St Mary's Cathedral, Church of Ireland, Tuam: Restoration & History (Tuam, Friends of St Mary's Cathedral, 1995)
- Claffey, John A., 'The restoration of St Mary's Cathedral 1863–78', in Claffey, John A. (ed.), Glimpses of Tuam since the famine (Tuam: Old Tuam Society, 1997) 79–88
