= Stuart Henry =

Stuart Henry may refer to:

- Stuart Henry (DJ) (1942–1995), British disc jockey
- Stuart Henry (criminologist) (born 1949), professor of criminal justice
- Stuart Henry (politician) (born 1946), Australian politician

== See also ==
- Henry Stuart (disambiguation)
