= William Gore (bishop) =

Irish Anglican bishop

William Gore (died 25 February 1784) was an 18th-century Anglican bishop in Ireland.

== Life ==
He was born the son of the Very Reverend William Gore, Dean of Down and his wife Honora Prittie.

Previously the Dean of Cashel from 1736 to 1758, he was nominated Bishop of Clonfert and Kilmacduagh on 17 March 1758, consecrated on 16 April of that year; translated to Elphin on 3 March 1762; and finally to Limerick, Ardfert and Aghadoe on 5 March 1772.

In 1783 he commissioned the building of a Manor House at Old Connaught, near Bray, but in County Dublin. Old Connaught House still exists today as a private and gated development of apartments in and around the Old House.

He died on 25 February 1784.

== Family ==
Gore married twice: firstly, to Mary, daughter of Chidley Coote; and secondly, to Mary, daughter of William French, with whom he had a son, William, who became an MP for Carrick.

Church of England titles
Preceded by William Carmichael	Bishop of Clonfert and Kilmacduagh; 1758–1762	Succeeded by John Oswald
Preceded by Edward Synge	Bishop of Elphin; 1762– 1772	Succeeded by Jemmett Browne
Preceded by John Averell	Bishop of Limerick, Ardfert and Aghadoe; 1772– 1784	Succeeded by William Cecil Pery
