= Church of St Laurence, Stanwick =

Church in North Northamptonshire, England

Coordinates: 52.332483°N 0.563228°W

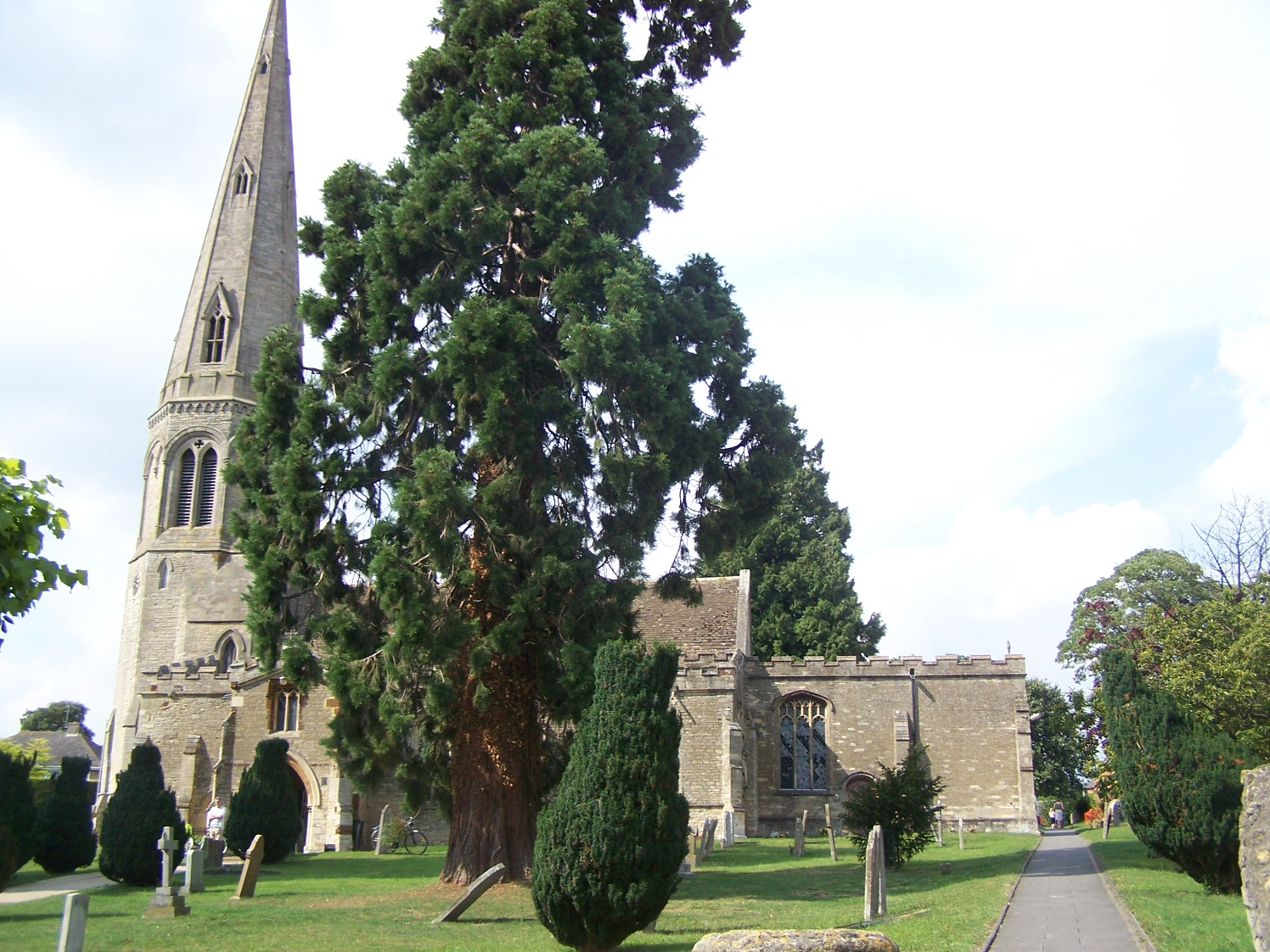
The Church of St Laurence, Stanwick

The Church of St Laurence is a Grade I listed building in the village of Stanwick in North Northamptonshire. It was originally within the Church of England Diocese of Lincoln but was transferred to the Diocese of Peterborough in 1541 towards the end of the Dissolution of the Monasteries during Henry VIII's reign.

== History ==
Many earlier records incorrectly recorded the name of the church as “St Lawrence” instead of “St Laurence”. For example The Buildings of England: Northamptonshire and Architectural Notices of the Churches of the Archdeaconry of Northampton. Historic England's National Heritage List for England was corrected in 2014.

The Church consists of an octagonal west Tower and Spire, Nave, Chancel, south Aisle, south Porch and Parvise.

The string-course on the Nave, and the serrated hood of the east side of the Chancel-arch, prove that the original Church of Stanwick consisted of Nave and Chancel of about 1200. In about 1230 the Tower, south Aisle and porch were probably added. The Spire was not finished till the beginning of the 14th century. Later a Perpendicular Chancel was substituted for the original structure, a few Decorated windows were inserted, and some reparation continued at intervals, until the parvise, the low roof, and the battlement completed the work. A rebuilding of the Chancel occurred in 1823.

The Tower is an octagon, but the north-east and south-east sides are filled up with the Tower stairs, so that a square face is presented to the body of the church, without disturbing the spirit of an octagonal arrangement. A treble bell ('St Denys') was cast in 1957 using the metal of two bells from the church at Faxton.

The original fabric of the Nave is earlier than that of the Tower and the Chancel. There have been perpendicular insertions in the Nave and the Chancel was rebuilt in the 15th or 16th century, and again restored in the early 19th century. The present Chancel is about three feet narrower than the original one.

The Porch is original, the outer door having jamb-shafts of Early English character. There is no clerestory. The battlements throughout the Church are Perpendicular.

In Richard Cumberland’s memoirs (published in 1806–07), he writes “The Spire of Stanwick Church is esteemed one of the most beautiful models in that style of architecture in the kingdom; my father (Denison Cumberland) added a very handsome clock, and ornamented the Chancel with a railing, screen, and entablature upon three-quarter columns, with a singing gallery at the west end, and spared no expense to keep his Church not only in that neatness and decorum, which befits the house of prayer, but also in a perfect state of good and permanent repair.”

A pulpit was presented by John Dolben, then Bishop of Rochester and formerly Rector of Stanwick, in 1778.

The weathercock is 157 feet above ground, and was given to the church in 1882 by George Henson, then landlord of the Duke of Wellington inn.

== Rectors (known) ==
The following list is based on the Clergy of the Church of England database (CCEd) and a plaque in the church. The spelling of names may change as early names were spelt in Old English, Middle English or Medieval Latin.

- 1224 Ralph of Collingham
- 1232 Ralph of Norwich
- 1258 Richard de Hereford
- 1266 Reginaldus
- 1267 John de Lovetoft
- 1302 Roger de Scardebury
- 1320 William de Casterton
- 1343 Thomas de Wynceby
- 1369 Richard Travers
- 1404 John Nowell
- 1424 Robert Sutton
- 1438 Richard Raynhill
- 1439 John Chichele
- 1460 John of Yate
- 1460 John Manningham
- 1478 John Bedford
- 1493 John Harryson
- 1539 William Buckmaster
- 1545 Robert Wynnall
- 1546 Richard Gill
- 1554 John Smyth
- 1564 Oliver Barlow
- 1568 Abraham Hartewell (or Hardwell)
- 1576 John Myers
- 1608 John Major
- 1608 Richard Cleburne
- 1623 William Dolben
- 1631 Henry Willis
- 1666 Edward Norris
- 1673 John Lambe
- 1717 Peter Needham
- 1731 Denison Cumberland
- 1777 Samuel Knight
- 1790 William Procter
- 1793 Charles Proby
- 1822 George Rowley
- 1838 John Sergeaunt
- 1858 Charles Boulby
- 1863 James Gandy
- 1873 George Mansfield
- 1882 James Bonner
- 1895 Henry Barnacle
- 1899 Frank Daniels
- 1904 Henry Richards
- 1919 Joseph Dollar
- 1924 Charles Swann
- 1926 John Ford
- 1928 William Hamerton
- 1944 Frederick Taylor
- 1952 Dennis Brown
- 1958 John Eagle
- 1988 Arthur Royford
- 1995 Elizabeth Wood
- 2004 Shena Bell
- 2018 Jonathan Aldwinckle
- 2023 In Vacancy
- 2025 Neil Bullen
