= Henry Tilson (bishop) =

Irish Anglican Bishop

The Right Reverend Henry Tilson
- Bishop of Elphin

Orders
- Consecration: 23 September 1639

Personal details
- Baptised: 1577
- Died: 1655
- Denomination: Church of Ireland

Henry Tilson (bapt. 1577 – 1655), Bishop of Elphin, was an Irish Anglican churchman.

== Life ==
The son of Henry Tilson, he was born in England at Midgley, in Yorkshire. He graduated BA at Balliol College, Oxford in 1597, became a fellow of University College in 1599, and graduated MA 1601. He spent periods as rector of Stanmer, Sussex, and vicar of Rochdale in Lancashire.

Tilson went to Ireland as chaplain to Thomas Wentworth, 1st Earl of Strafford, the Lord Deputy, and received preferment. He was Dean of Christ Church, Dublin from 1634 to 1639; Archdeacon of Connor from 1635 until 1639; and Bishop of Elphin from his consecration on 23 September 1639 for the rest of his life.

In 1645 Tilson left Ireland, to avoid the insurgency that followed the 1641 Irish Rebellion. He went to Soothill Hall, in Yorkshire, and the Southwell family. He continued to preach, at Cumberworth, and died at Soothill Hall on 31 March 1655. He was buried at Dewsbury.

Church of England titles
Preceded by Randolph Barlow	Dean of Christ Church, Dublin; 1634–1639	Succeeded by James Margetson
Preceded by Andrew Moneypenny	Archdeacon of Connor; 1635–1639	Succeeded by John Richardson
Preceded by Edward King	Bishop of Elphin; 1639–1655	Succeeded by See vacant
