= Harry Stewart (disambiguation) =

Harry Stewart may refer to:

- Harry Stewart (footballer) (1886–?), Scottish footballer, see List of Bury F.C. players (1–24 appearances)
- Harry Allan Stewart (1892–1970), Canadian dentist and politician
- Harry Stewart (1908–1956), American entertainer
- Harry Stewart Jr. (1924–2025), American fighter pilot]]
- Harry Stewart (swimmer) (born 2004), English Paralympic swimmer

== See also ==
- Henry Stewart
- Harold Stewart
