= John Burdett (priest) =

Irish Anglican priest (1657–1726)

John Burdett (1657–1726) was a Church of Ireland priest in Ireland during the late seventeenth and early eighteenth centuries.

Burdett was born in Dublin and educated at Trinity College there. He was Dean of Clonfert from 1692 until his death in July 1726
