= Henry Stewart =

Henry Stewart may refer to:

- Henry Stewart, 1st Lord Methven (c. 1495–1552), third husband of Margaret Tudor, sister of Henry VIII of England
- Henry Frederick, Prince of Wales (1594–1612), eldest son of James I of England
- Henry Stewart (cricketer) (1763–1837), amateur cricketer from Hampshire
- Henry Stewart (politician) (1749–1840), Irish MP for Longford Borough 1783–90, 1791–99
- Henry Stewart (footballer, born 1847) (1847–1937), Scottish football player and later an Anglican priest, FA Cup winner in 1873
- Henry Stewart (footballer, born 1925) (1925–1996), English football player for Huddersfield
- Henry Stewart (archdeacon of Dromore) (1836–1886), Anglican priest in Ireland
- Henry Stewart (archdeacon of Brecon) (1873–1960), Welsh Anglican priest
- Henry Scott Stewart, American football coach, lawyer, and businessman

== See also ==
- Henry Stuart (disambiguation)
- Harry Stewart (1908–1956), American comedian
