= John Ryder (bishop) =

English bishop (c.1697–1775)

The Right Reverend and Right Honourable John Ryder PC (Ire), D.D.
- Archbishop of Tuam
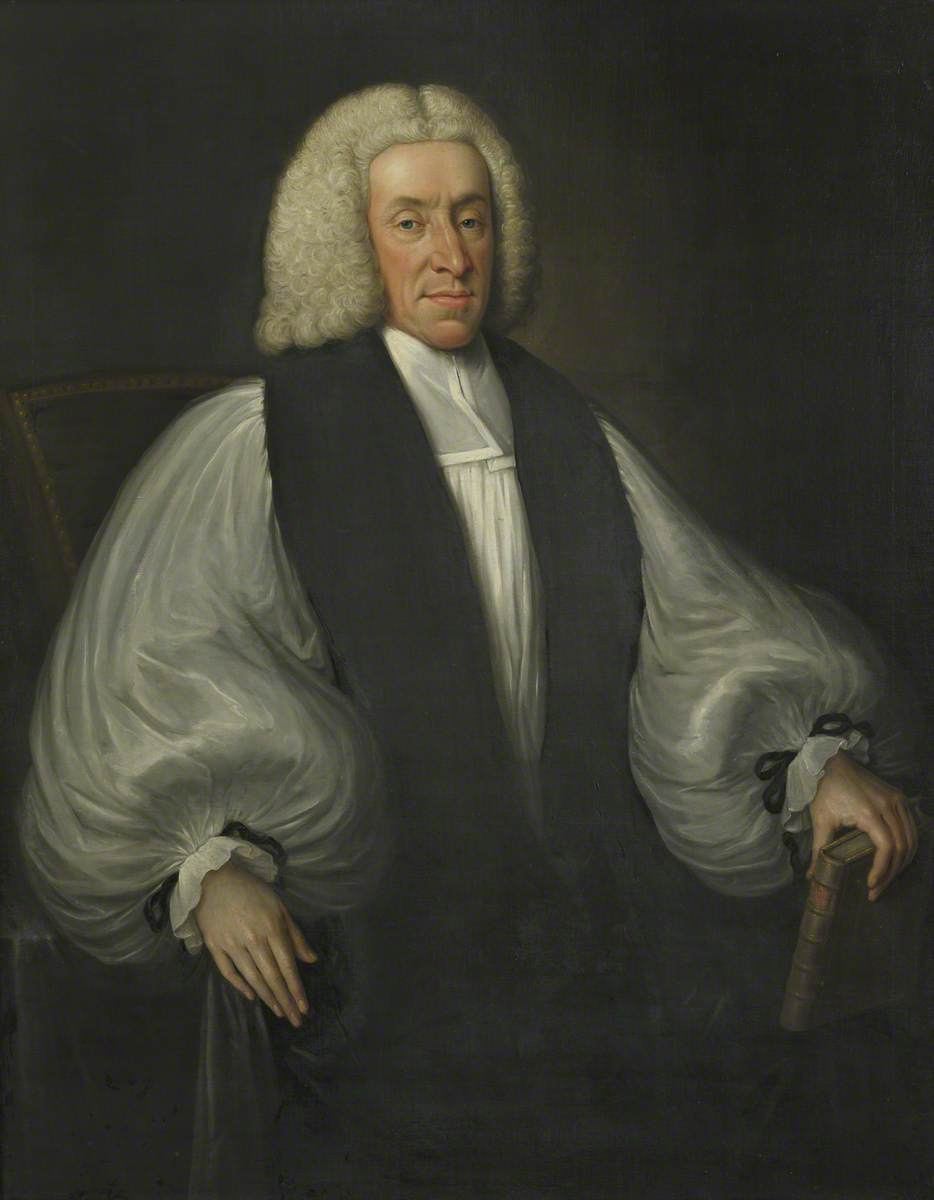
- attributed to Philip Hussey
- Church: Church of Ireland
- Archdiocese: Tuam
- Appointed: 19 March 1752
- In office: 1752-1775
- Predecessor: Josiah Hort
- Successor: Jemmett Browne
- Previous posts: Bishop of Killaloe (1742–1743); Bishop of Down and Connor (1743–1752)

Orders
- Ordination: 14 May 1721 by Edmund Gibson
- Consecration: 21 February 1742 by John Hoadly

Personal details
- Born: c. 1697 Nuneaton, Warwickshire, England
- Died: 4 February 1775 (aged 77–78) Nice, Kingdom of France
- Denomination: Anglican
- Parents: Dudley Ryder
- Spouse: Alice Wilmot; Frances Hutchinson
- Children: 2
- Education: Queens' College, Cambridge

John Ryder (c. 1697 – 4 February 1775) was the Church of Ireland Bishop of Down and Connor, from 1743 to 1752, and then Archbishop of Tuam, from 1752 to his death in 1775.

== Life ==
The son of Dudley Ryder, haberdasher, he was born at Nuneaton, Warwickshire, c. 1697. His grandfather was another Dudley Ryder (died 1683), an ejected rector of Bedworth. He was educated at Charterhouse School and Queens' College, Cambridge, where he graduated BA in 1715, MA in 1719, and DD in 1741.

In 1721, Ryder was appointed as vicar of Nuneaton and held the living until his appointment as Church of Ireland bishop of Killaloe by letters patent of 30 January 1742. He was consecrated in St Bridget's, Dublin, on 21 February. Only a year later he was translated to the see of Down and Connor, and was further promoted, in March 1752, to be archbishop of Tuam and bishop of Ardagh. His views were evangelical.

Ryder spent his later years at Nice, where he died on 4 February 1775, aged 77 or 78, from the effects of a fall from his horse. He was buried on 6 February in a ground near the shore, purchased for Protestant burials by the British consul. The area was later eroded by the sea.

His daughter Catherine married a John Hamilton and, travelling on the Continent, met and became a dear friend of Yekaterina Romanovna Vorontsova-Dashkova, a major figure of the Russian Enlightenment. Princess Dashkova came to Ireland and spent time with the family. Two of John Ryder's relations, Martha and Katherine Wilmot went to Russia to renew the friendship.
