= Henry Leslie =

Henry Leslie may refer to:

- Henry Leslie (bishop) (1580–1661), Scottish bishop in the Church of Ireland
- Henry Leslie (dean of Connor) (1775–1848), dean of Connor
- Henry Leslie (dean of Dromore) (1651–1733), Anglican priest in Ireland
- Henry David Leslie (1822–1896), English composer
- Henry Leslie (playwright) (1830–1881), English actor and playwright
- Sir (Henry John) Lindores Leslie, 9th Baronet (1920–1967) of the Leslie baronets

== See also ==
- Harry G. Leslie (1878–1937), Indiana Republican Party politician
- Leslie (name)
