= Alexander Spicer =

Irish priest (died 1692)

Alexander Spicer was an Anglican priest in Ireland in the 17th century.

Spicer was born in Somerset and educated at Exeter College, Oxford. He was Chaplain to Arthur Chichester, 1st Baron Chichester, Lord Deputy of Ireland and Dean of Killaloe from 1662, holding both positions until his death in 1692.
