= Richard Bourke (bishop) =

Irish cleric and Bishop of Waterford and Lismore (1767–1832)

The Right Reverend and Honourable Hon. Richard Bourke
- Church: Church of Ireland
- Diocese: Bishop of Waterford and Lismore
- In office: 1813–1832
- Predecessor: Joseph Stock
- Successor: Diocese merged with Cashel
- Other posts: Prebendary of Tuam (1791); Rector of Templemichael and Mohill (1795); Dean of Ardagh (1800–13)

Orders
- Consecration: 10 October 1813 by Charles Brodrick

Personal details
- Born: Richard Bourke; 22 April 1767
- Died: 15 November 1832 (aged 65)
- Parents: Joseph Bourke, 3rd Earl of Mayo; Elizabeth Meade
- Spouse: Frances Fowler (m. 1795; died 1827)
- Children: 4, including: Robert Bourke, 5th Earl of Mayo
- Education: Christ Church, Oxford

The Honourable Richard Bourke (22 April 1767 – 15 November 1832) was an Irish Church of Ireland cleric who was Dean of Ardagh (1800–1813) and the last Bishop of Waterford and Lismore (1813–1832) before it merged with the defunct Ecclesiastical Province of Cashel.

== Early life ==
Born into an aristocratic family, Bourke was the second son of Joseph Bourke, 3rd Earl of Mayo and his wife Elizabeth Meade, the daughter of Richard Meade, 3rd Baronet. He was educated at Christ Church, Oxford.

== Career ==
Bourke was appointed Prebendary of Tuam in 1791, Rector of Templemichael and of Mohill in 1795 and became Dean of Ardagh in 1800 before his elevation to the episcopacy. He was nominated to the See of Waterford and Lismore on 25 August 1813 and consecrated on 10 October 1813.

== Family ==
Bourke married Frances Fowler (d.1827) on 20 March 1795, and they had four children: Frances, Mildred, Catherine, and Robert (later 5th Earl of Mayo).

== See also ==
- House of Burgh, an Anglo-Norman and Hiberno-Norman dynasty founded in 1193
- Church of Ireland

Church of Ireland titles
Preceded by Joseph Stock	Bishop of Waterford and Lismore; 1813–1832	Succeeded by Diocese merged with Cashel
Preceded by Charles Mongan Warburton	Dean of Ardagh; 1800–1813	Succeeded by Richard Graves
