= Samuel Hutchinson =

Anglican bishop

Samuel Hutchinson was an Anglican bishop in Ireland.

Formerly Dean of Dromore and Archdeacon of Connor he was nominated Bishop of Killala and Achonry on 27 March 1759 and consecrated on 22 April that year. He died on 27 October 1780.

Religious titles
Preceded by John Hamilton	Dean of Dromore; 1729–1759	Succeeded by Walter Cope
Preceded by John Wetherby	Archdeacon of Connor; 1736–1759	Succeeded by Alexander Bissett
Preceded by Richard Robinson	Bishop of Killala and Achonry; 1759–1780	Succeeded by William Cecil Pery
