= John Parker (bishop) =

Irish clergyman (died 1681)

The Right Reverend and Right Honourable John Parker PC (Ire)
- Archbishop of Dublin; Bishop of Glendalough; Primate of Ireland
- Church: Church of Ireland
- Diocese: Dublin and Glendalough
- Appointed: 28 February 1679
- In office: 1679–1681
- Predecessor: Michael Boyle
- Successor: Francis Marsh
- Previous posts: Bishop of Elphin (1661-1667); Archbishop of Tuam (1667-1679)

Orders
- Consecration: 27 January 1661 by John Bramhall

Personal details
- Born: Dublin, County Dublin, Kingdom of Ireland
- Died: 28 December 1681 Dublin, County Dublin, Kingdom of Ireland
- Buried: Christ Church Cathedral, Dublin
- Denomination: Anglican
- Spouse: Mary Clarke

John Parker (died 28 December 1681) was a Church of Ireland clergyman who came to prominence after the English Restoration, first as Bishop of Elphin, then as Archbishop of Tuam and finally as Archbishop of Dublin and Primate of Ireland.

== Early life ==
Born in Dublin, Parker was the son of another Rev. John Parker (died 1643), also a Church of Ireland clergyman, dean of Leighlin (1618–37) and then of Killaloe, County Clare until his death. A John Parker is recorded as a scholar at Trinity College Dublin, in 1636.

== Career ==
Parker was ordained a deacon in 1638 and in 1642 became a minor canon of St Patrick's Cathedral, Dublin. He was prebendary of Rathangan, in the diocese of Kildare, and in 1643 prebendary of Maynooth at St Patrick's and of St Michan's at Christ Church Cathedral, Dublin, both benefices previously held by his father. When his father died in 1643 he succeeded him as dean of Killaloe.

During the early years of the Irish Confederate Wars, Parker was in Dublin as chaplain to the Earl of Ormond, Lord Lieutenant of Ireland. In 1649, the Cromwellian authorities deprived him of all his offices and imprisoned him as a suspected Royalist spy, although his patron Ormond was able to get his release after only a few months in an exchange of prisoners. In 1650, Parker went to England. He stayed there until the Restoration, when he was one of the Irish Royalist clergymen who secured new preferments. Appointed Bishop of Elphin on 6 August 1660, he was consecrated in Dublin on 27 January 1661, the day after he was made a Doctor of Divinity by Trinity College Dublin.

Parker was a member of the committee of the Irish House of Lords which drafted a declaration in 1661 to continue the Anglican basis of the Church of Ireland. In August 1661 he was sent to London to present the Convocation's case to the king, and he stayed there until March 1662.

On 9 August 1667, Parker was appointed Archbishop of Tuam, a position which brought with it the sees of Annaghdown and Kilfenora.

On 25 October 1671, the future Archbishop William King of Dublin was ordained a deacon as Parker's chaplain and became a member of his household at Tuam. King later recalled that after taking up this place he found a great contrast between the humble fare he had eaten as an undergraduate at Trinity and the abundance of the food and drink served in the Archbishop's palace.

In 1679, on the recommendation of Ormond, Parker was translated to become Archbishop of Dublin and Primate of Ireland, holding at the same time various other livings. He died at Dublin in December 1681 and was entombed there in Christ Church.

== Family ==
Parker married Mary, a daughter of Thomas Clarke of Fermoyle, County Longford, and their eldest daughter, Mary, in 1666 married Murrough Boyle, 1st Viscount Blesington, son of Michael Boyle, Archbishop of Dublin and Lord Chancellor of Ireland; but she died in 1668. Their daughter Elizabeth married Joseph Deane of Crumlin, the heir to estates in the counties of Dublin, Wexford, Kilkenny, Cork, and Waterford, and they had two sons, Edward Deane, who became member of parliament successively for Ennisteoge, County Dublin and County Kilkenny; and Joseph Deane, Chief Baron of the Irish Exchequer. Their son, John married 2nd Frances Abney, daughter of Sir Edward Abney of Willesley, Derbyshire, England.

Church of Ireland titles
Preceded by Michael Boyle	Archbishop of Dublin; 1679–1681	Succeeded by Francis Marsh
