= Jonas Wheeler (bishop) =

Irish Anglican bishop

Jonas Wheeler (1543–1640) was Bishop of Ossory from 1613 until his death in 1640.

Wheeler was educated at Brasenose College, Oxford.

== Career ==
He served as a royal chaplain to Queen Elizabeth I, who is said to have held him in high regard, and to have given him a fine silver coconut cup, which is generally identified as the so-called "Queen Elizabeth's cup" which his descendants later presented to St. Canice's Cathedral, Kilkenny. He continued in office as a royal chaplain under James I.

He held the office of Dean of Christ Church Cathedral, Dublin from 1595 until 1618 (the last five years in commendam). He acquired substantial lands in County Kilkenny.

== Family ==
He married Martha Tucker of Kent. They had one son:

- Oliver, of Grenane, County Laois-

and six daughters, including :

- Elizabeth, who married Randolph Barlow, Archbishop of Tuam, and had issue,
- Mary, who married Sir Patrick Wemyss and had issue,
- Sarah, who married firstly Matthew Tyrrell, Mayor of Dublin, and secondly Sir James Donnellan, Chief Justice of the Irish Common Pleas, by whom she had several children, including Nehemiah Donnellan (1649-1705), Chief Baron of the Irish Exchequer.

Through his son Oliver, Jonas was the ancestor of the Wheeler-Cuffe Baronets.

He died on 19 April 1640, aged 97. His widow died in 1646.

He was described as a prelate who was "esteemed for his hospitable and obliging temper", and for his genuine piety.

== Notes ==
Church of Ireland titles
Preceded by John Garvey	Dean of Christ Church Cathedral, Dublin; 1595–1618	Succeeded by Randolph Barlow
Preceded by Richard Deane	Bishop of Ossory; 1613–1640	Succeeded by Griffith Williams
