= William Daniel (bishop) =

Irish clergyman

The Right Reverend William Daniel D.D.
- Archbishop of Tuam
- Archdiocese: Tuam
- Installed: 1609
- Term ended: 1628
- Predecessor: Nehemiah Donnellan
- Successor: Randolph Barlow

Orders
- Consecration: August 1609

Personal details
- Born: Kilkenny
- Died: 11 July 1628 Tuam
- Buried: St Mary's Cathedral, Tuam
- Denomination: Church of Ireland
- Education: Trinity College, Dublin

William Daniel (Irish: Uilliam Ó Domhnaill, or Ó Domhnuill) D.D. was an Irish clergyman who served as the Church of Ireland Archbishop of Tuam from 1609 until his death in 1628.

Born in Kilkenny, he was one of the first appointed Scholars of Trinity College Dublin, and afterwards one of the college's first elected Fellows. While at Trinity College, he took up the work of translating The New Testament (Tiomna Nuadh) into Irish. This work was commenced by Nicholas Walsh (Bishop of Ossory), John Kearney (Treasurer of St Patrick's, Dublin), and Nehemiah Donnellan (Archbishop of Tuam), and was printed in 1602. William Daniel also translated an Irish version of the Book of Common Prayer, which was published in 1608.

He was appointed Prebendary of Stagonil in St Patrick's Cathedral, Dublin in 1591, and Treasurer of the cathedral in 1609. He was nominated Archbishop of Tuam on 28 June and consecrated in August 1609. After he became archbishop, he continued to hold the treasurership in commendam. The Archbishop died at Tuam on 11 July 1628, and was buried in the same tomb with his predecessor Nehemiah Donnellan in St Mary's Cathedral, Tuam.

== See also ==
- Bible translations by language
