= Samuel Rastall =

Samuel Rastall (1749–1781) was an Anglican priest in Ireland in the Eighteenth Century.

Rastall was born in Newark-on-Trent and educated at Peterhouse, Cambridge. He was Dean of Killaloe from 1780 until his death.
