= The Old Rectory, Stanwick =

Building in Stanwick, Northamptonshire, England

Coordinates: 52.332577°N 0.564201°W

The Old Rectory is a Grade II* listed building located in the centre of Stanwick in North Northamptonshire, close to the parish church.

== History ==
The Old Rectory was rebuilt in 1717 by Sir James Burrough (1691–1764) for the local rector, Dr. Peter Needham (1680–1731) and cost £1,000. It was described by Doctor Richard Cumberland (dramatist) in his memoirs as being a handsome square of four equal fronts, built of stone, containing four rooms on a floor, with a gallery running through the centre.
