= Edward Albert Myles =

Anglican priest

Edward Albert Myles (25 September 1865, Limerick – 7 May 1951, Banbridge) was an Anglican priest in Ireland during the late 19th century and the first half of the 20th century

Myles was educated at Trinity College, Dublin. He was ordained deacon in 1889 and priest in 1890. He began his career with curacies in Donaghcloney, Belfast and Seapatrick. He was the incumbent at Tullylish from 1896 until his death. He was appointed Dean of Dromore in 1933, serving until 1950.
