= Old Connaught House =

Georgian house in Rathmichael, Dublin, Ireland

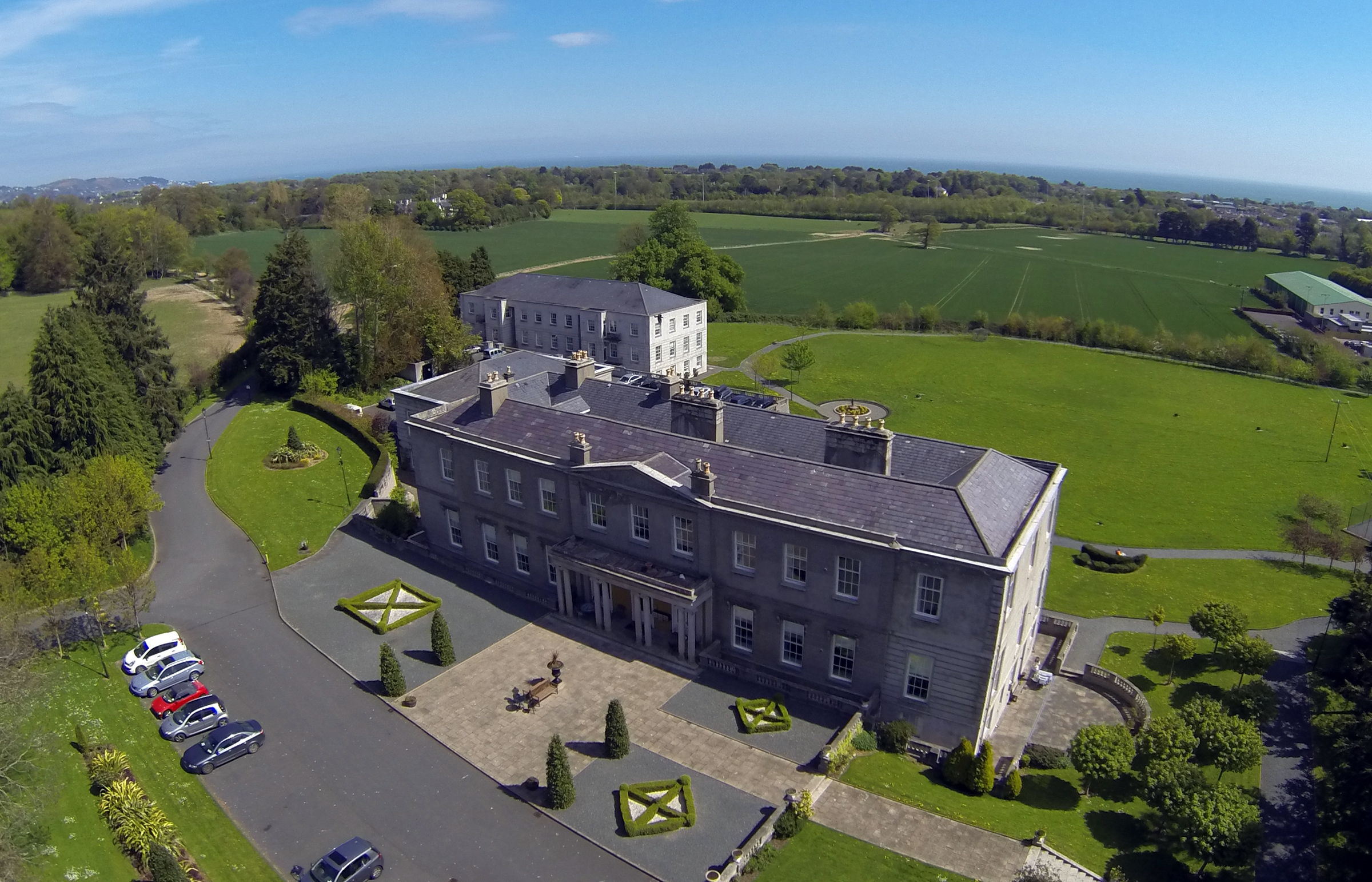
- Old Connaught House in 2013

General information
- Type: House
- Architectural style: Georgian
- Location: Rathmichael, County Dublin, Ireland
- Coordinates: 53.212°N 6.134°W
- Elevation: 50 m (160 ft)
- Estimated completion: 1784

Technical details
- Material: granite

Design and construction
- Developer: William Gore

Old Connaught House is an 18th-century house located in Rathmichael, Dublin, Ireland.

Though originally built for bishop William Gore, shortly after his death in 1784 it was leased by William Plunket (later Baron Plunket). The house was occupied by the Plunket family for several generations.

The house was sold to the Congregation of Christian Brothers in 1946 and was in use from 1946-72 as a novitiate school before being sold on again. The house remained unoccupied for several years before being leased to a non-profit equestrian organisation. It was sold in 2000, renovated, and is now a development of 24 apartments in the main house with a further 26 apartments in a separate building within the grounds.

The townland of Old Connaught was identified by Dún Laoghaire–Rathdown County Council as an 'Historic Landscape Character Area' (HLCA) in their Draft County Development Plan 2022-2028.
