= William Preston (bishop) =

Irish Anglican bishop (1729–1789)

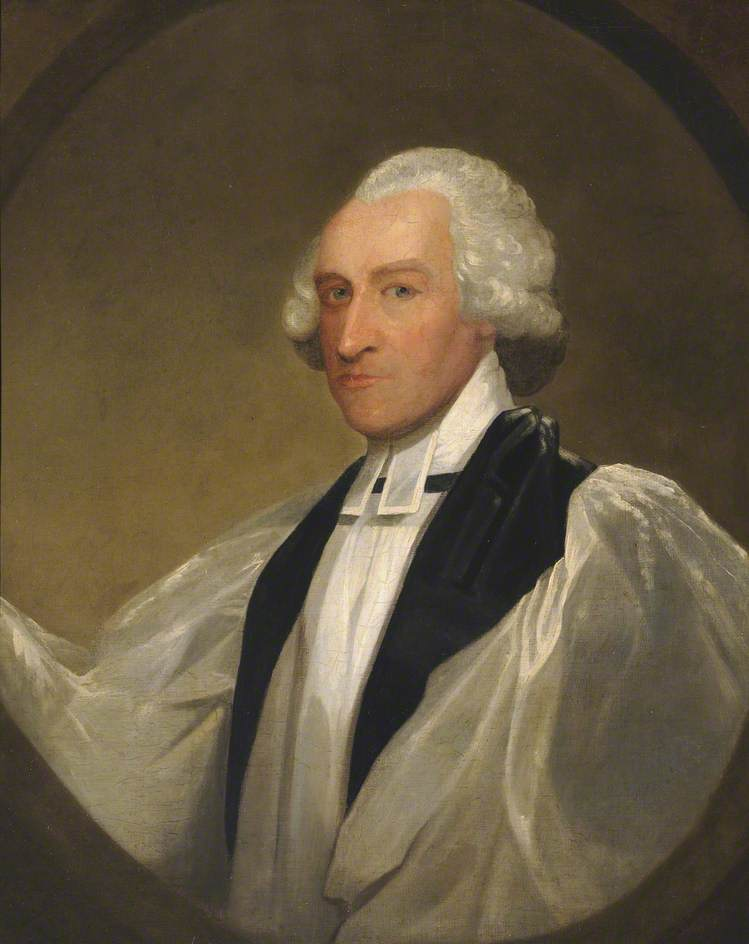
1788 portrait of Preston by Gilbert Stuart

William Preston, D.D. (1729 – 19 April 1789) was an Irish Anglican bishop.

== Life ==
William Preston was the son of John Preston of Hincaster, Westmorland, by his third wife Ann. He was educated at Heversham Grammar School and admitted a sizar at Trinity College, Cambridge in 1749 at the age of 19. He graduated B.A. in 1753, M.A. in 1756. He became a Fellow of Trinity in 1755, and was rector of Ockham, Surrey from 1764 to 1784. He gave up his fellowship in 1765.

Preston spent some time as a chaplain to Philip Yonge, the bishop of Norwich. He then went to Vienna, as chaplain to Lord Stormont. He acted as the British chargé d'affaires in Naples, where he had moved for his health, in the absence of Sir William Hamilton. He was elected a Fellow of the Royal Society in 1778.

After becoming chaplain and secretary to Charles Manners, 4th Duke of Rutland, Preston was nominated as Bishop of Killala and Achonry on 13 October 1784, and consecrated on 11 November that year. Translated to Ferns and Leighlin on 9 November 1787, he died in Dublin on 19 April 1789 and was buried at Ferns Cathedral.

Church of England titles
Preceded by William Cecil Pery	Bishop of Killala and Achonry; 1784–1787	Succeeded by John Law
Preceded by Walter Cope	Bishop of Ferns and Leighlin; 1787–1789	Succeeded by Euseby Cleaver
