= Randolph Barlow =

Styles of Randolph Barlow, B.D.
- Reference style: The Most Reverend
- Spoken style: Your Grace
- Religious style: Archbishop

Randolph Barlow, (Randulph, Ranulph, Randall or Ralph Barlow; c. 1572 – 1638) was an Anglican archbishop. He was made Pembroke College fellow at Cambridge University in 1593; attained Master of Arts in 1594; awarded Doctor of Divinity in 1600; took holy orders and later served in the Church of Ireland as the Archbishop of Tuam from 1629 to 1638.

Born in around 1572, his first known ecclesiastical appointment was in 1601 as parish priest of Ripton Regis, in 1612 as canon of Kildare Cathedral, and later to the Prebendary of Geashill (1614–17). He was also appointed Archdeacon of Meath in 1612, Dean of Leighlin (1614–18) and Precentor of Ossory (1615–18). He was then appointed the Dean of Christ Church, Dublin in 1618.

He was nominated the Archbishop of Tuam on 6 February 1629 and consecrated at Drogheda in April 1629. He was permitted to hold the deanery of Christ Church, Dublin and the rectory of Athenry in commendam. He appears to retain the archdeaconry of Meath until the next archdeacon was appointed in 1633, and resigned the deanery of Christ Church, Dublin on 17 December 1634.

He married Elizabeth Wheeler, daughter of Jonas Wheeler, Bishop of Ossory and Martha Tucker. They had at least one daughter Elizabeth, who married Sir Francis Hamilton, 1st Baronet, of Killock.

He died in office at Tuam, County Galway on 22 February 1638, aged 66, and was buried in St Mary's Cathedral, Tuam.

== Notes ==
Church of Ireland titles
Preceded by John Rider	Archdeacon of Meath; 1613–1633	Succeeded by John Bramhall
Preceded by Thomas Tedder	Dean of Leighlin; 1614–1618	Succeeded by John Parker
Preceded by Jonas Wheeler	Dean of Christ Church, Dublin; 1618–1634	Succeeded by Henry Tilson
Preceded by William Daniel	Archbishop of Tuam; 1629–1638	Succeeded by Richard Boyle
