= Tobias Pullen =

Irish bishop

Tobias Pullen (1648 – 22 January 1713), or Tobias Pullein, was an Irish bishop.

== Biography ==
Pullen was Anglican bishop of Cloyne and of Dromore, born at Middleham, Yorkshire in 1648, was, according to Cotton, grandson of Samuel Pullein (1598–1667), archbishop of Tuam. He was probably son of that prelate's brother, Joshua Pullen, dean of Middleham from 1638 until his death in 1657. Tobias entered Trinity College, Dublin, on 11 March 1663. In January 1666, being then in holy orders, although aged only eighteen, he became a vicar-choral of Tuam, and held the post until 1671. In 1668, after he had graduated B.A., he was elected scholar of Trinity College, and he held a fellowship there from 1671 to 1677. In 1668 also he graduated B.D. and D.D., and was appointed rector of Tullyaughnish, Raphoe. He resigned this living in 1682 on being made dean of Ferns, rector of Louth and Bewley, and vicar of St. Peter's, Drogheda.

Pullen was attainted of treason by James II in 1689, but after the accession of William III and Mary II he was created bishop of Cloyne by letters patent dated 13 November 1694. Within a few months he was translated to the see of Dromore, co. Down (7 May 1695). Soon afterwards he issued an anonymous 'Answer' to the "Case of the Protestant Dissenters in Ireland," by Joseph Boyse, a presbyterian minister, who advocated toleration, with immunity from tests, for dissenters in Ireland. Pullen protested that toleration would multiply sects, and deprive episcopalians of the power to "show tenderness to their dissenting brethren." The sacramental test for civil offices he described as a "trivial and inconsiderable mark of compliance." When a bill "for ease to Dissenters" was introduced by the Earl of Drogheda in the Irish House of Lords on 24 September 1695, Pullen was one of the twenty-one bishops (out of forty-three peers) by whose votes the measure was defeated. In 1697, Pullen (again anonymously) published "A Defence of" his position, and suggested that presbyterians before coming to Ireland should undergo a quarantine (in the shape of tests), like persons from a country infected with the plague.

Pullen built an episcopal residence at Magherellin. Two-thirds of the sum expended was refunded by his successor, pursuant to the statute. He died on 22 January 1713, and was buried at St. Peter's, Drogheda. He married, on 16 May 1678, Elizabeth Leigh (d. 4 October 1691), by whom he had five children. The youngest, Joshua, born in 1687, entered Trinity College, Dublin, on 11 June 1701, graduated M.A., and was chancellor of the diocese of Dromore from 1727 until his death in 1767.

Besides two sermons and the pamphlets already noticed, Pullen is said to be the author of a scarce tract, "A Vindication of Sir Robert King's Designs and Actions in relation to the late and present Lord Kingston," 1699, no printer's name or place.
