= James Mahon (priest) =

Anglican priest

James Mahon (16 December 1773 – 22 March 1837) was an Anglican priest in Ireland during the late decade of the 18th century and the first four of the 19th.

Bourne was born in County Galway and educated at Trinity College, Dublin. He was Dean of Tuam from 1809 to 1810; and Dean of Dromore from 1811 until his death.
