= Mary Alcock =

British poet, essayist, philanthropist

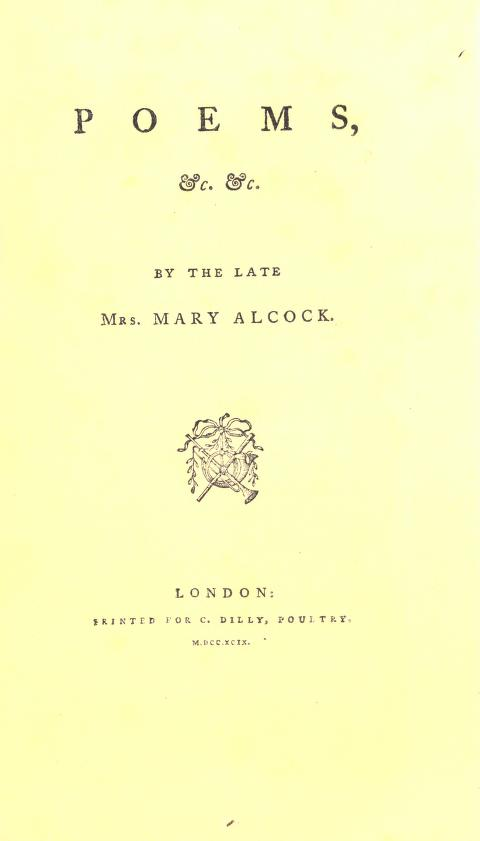
- Title page of Mary Cumberland Alcock's Poems, &c. &c. Ed. Joanna Hughes (London : C. Dilly, 1799) (Internet Archive)
- Born: Mary Cumberland c. 1742; Stanwick, Northamptonshire
- Died: 1798, 57 yrs. Northamptonshire
- Occupation: writer
- Spouse: Alexander Alcock
- Relatives: Joanna Bentley (1704/5–1775) (mother); Denison Cumberland (1705/6–1774) (father); Richard Bentley (grandfather); Richard Cumberland (brother)
- Writing career
- Notable works: Poems … by the Late Mrs Mary Alcock Ed. Joanna Hughes (London: C. Dilly, 1799)

Mary Alcock (née Cumberland, c. 1742 – 1798) was an English poet, essayist, and philanthropist. She was part of Lady Anne Miller's literary circle in Bath. Mary Alcock was the daughter of Bishop Denison Cumberland and Joanna Bentley, and her brother was the famous playwright Richard Cumberland. Her husband, the Reverend Alexander Alcock, suffered from severe mental health issues ("a violent nervous affection on his spirits"), which led to the early breakdown of their marriage. Later in life, she moved to Bath and cared for her seven nieces after her sister's death. Her posthumous collection, Poems, was published by her niece Joanna Hughes in 1799 and included notable subscribers like the famous poet William Cowper and writer Hannah More.

== Biography ==
Mary Cumberland was the youngest child of Joanna Bentley (1704/5–1775) and Bishop Denison Cumberland (1705/6–1774). Richard Bentley, classicist and master of Trinity College, Cambridge, was her maternal grandfather, and Richard Cumberland (1732–1811), playwright, was her brother.

She spent her childhood in the town of Stanwick, Northamptonshire and in Fulham, Middlesex. In 1762 her family relocated to the Kingdom of Ireland, when Denison Cumberland's father was appointed as chaplain to George Montagu-Dunk, 2nd Earl of Halifax, Lord Lieutenant of Ireland. It was there that she married, in or around 1770, although the identity of Alcock, her husband, has not been satisfactorily established (according to her will he was the Rev. Alexander Alcock).

Her husband's mental health seems to have been fragile and the marriage was probably unhappy. She nursed her parents through long illnesses until their deaths and cared for her seven nieces after the death of her sister, Elizabeth Hughes, in 1770. A widow by the early 1780s, she moved to Bath, Somerset, where she was part of the literary circle of Anne Miller (1741–1781) and took part in her poetry contests. She participated in various charitable activities.

There are two pieces in her published works that critique the popular sentimental novel as "hobgoblin nonsense": "The Scribbler," and "A Receipt for Writing a Novel."

Never robust, she died at the age of fifty-seven in Northamptonshire. Her niece Joanna Hughes edited her collected works after her death: some 183 pages of poems and essays. The collection received little critical interest, although subscribers included leading cultural and literary figures such as Charles Burney, Elizabeth Carter, William Cowper, Hannah More, and some members of the royal family.

== Selected works ==
- The Confined Debtor: a Fragment from a Prison (1775)
- The Air Balloon, or, Flying Mortal (London: E. Macklew, 1784): poem, 7 pp., pub. anon.
- Poems … by the Late Mrs Mary Alcock Ed. Joanna Hughes (London: C. Dilly, 1799)

== Resources ==
- "Alcock, Mary." The Women's Print History Project, 2019, Person ID 2110. Accessed 2022-07-26.
- Blain, Virginia, et al., eds. "Alcock, Mary." The Feminist Companion to Literature in English. New Haven and London: Yale UP, 1990. 13.
- Ellis, Markman. "Alcock, Mary (1741?–1798)." Oxford Dictionary of National Biography. Ed. H. C. G. Matthew and Brian Harrison. Oxford: OUP, 2004. 19 Jan. 2007.
- Lonsdale, Roger, ed. "Mary Alcock (née Cumberland)." Eighteenth century women poets: an Oxford anthology. Oxford; New York: Oxford University Press, 1989; rpt. 1990, pp. 461–468. (Internet Archive)

== See also ==
- Romantic literature in English
