= Walter Cope (bishop) =

Anglican bishop

Walter Cope was an 18th-century Anglican bishop in Ireland.

Cope was educated at Trinity College, Dublin.

Previously Dean of Dromore, he was nominated to be Bishop of Clonfert and Kilmacduagh on 27 January 1772 and consecrated on 15 March that year. Translated to Ferns and Leighlin on 9 August 1782, he died in post on 31 July 1787.

Church of England titles
| Preceded by Samuel Hutchinson | Dean of Dromore; 1759–1772 | Succeeded by Joseph Deane Bourke |
| Preceded by Denison Cumberland | Bishop of Clonfert and Kilmacduagh; 1772–1782 | Succeeded by John Law |
| Preceded by Joseph Deane Bourke | Bishop of Ferns and Leighlin; 1782–1787 | Succeeded by William Preston |
