= Dean of Dromore =

Church of Ireland official

The Dean of Dromore has responsibility for Dromore Cathedral in the Diocese of Down and Dromore in the Church of Ireland.

== Deans of Dromore ==
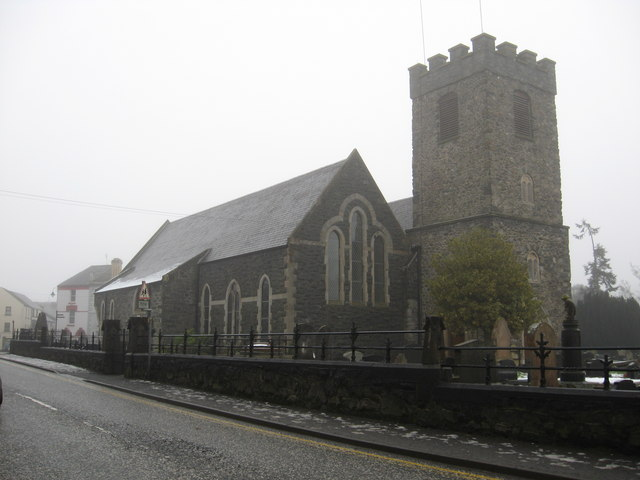
Christ the Redeemer Cathedral, Dromore

- 1693/4 Isaac Plume
- 1609 William Todd
- 1621 Thomas Wilson
- 1622 John Wall
- 1623 Robert Dawson
- 1628/9 William Moore
- 1632/3–1638 George Synge (afterwards Bishop of Cloyne, 1638)
- 1638–1641 Robert Forward
- 1642–1673 Nicholas Greaves
- 1673–1681 William Smyth (afterwards Bishop of Killala and Achonry, 1681)
- 1681–1721 John Leslie
- 1721/2 Henry Leslie
- 1721/2 George Berkeley (afterwards Dean of Derry, 1724)
- 1724–1729 John Hamilton (son-in-law of Francis Hutchinson, Bishop of Down and Connor)
- 1729–1759 Samuel Hutchinson (afterwards Bishop of Killala and Achonry, 1759)
- 1759–1772 Walter Cope (afterwards Bishop of Clonfert and Kilmacduagh, 1772)
- 1772–1772 Hon. Joseph Deane Bourke, 3rd Earl of Mayo (afterwards Bishop of Ferns and Leighlin, 1772)
- 1772–1808 Raphael Walsh
- 1809–1837 James Mahon
- 1841–1842 William Henry Wynne
- 1842–1850 Holt Waring
- 1851–1875 Daniel Bagot
- 1879–1885 Jeffry Lefroy
- 1885–1887 Henry Stewart
- 1887–1894 Theophilus Campbell
- 1894-1905 Abraham Dawson
- 1905–1925 Robert Stuart O'Loughlin
- 1925–1931 Thomas William Clarendon
- 1931–1932 Henry Biddall Swanzy
- 1945–1951 Edward Albert Myles
- 1951–1957 Wilfred R.M. Orr
- 1957–1961 William A. Jones
- 1961–1964 John William Appleby
- 1964–1965 Arthur Theodore Irving Forde
- 1965–1971 Henry Hughes
- 1971–1975 Hugh Hastings Richard Mayes
- 1975–1984 R.J. Norman Lockhart
- 1990-1992 Mervyn Robert Wilson
- 1993–1995 Roland Hutchinson
- 1995–2002 David Robert Chillingworth (afterwards Bishop of St Andrews, Dunkeld and Dunblane, 2005)
- 2002–2013 Stephen H. Lowry
- 2014–2015 Bryan T. Kerr (Resigned 30 November 2015)
- 2016–present Geoff Wilson
