= Denison Cumberland =

Denison Cumberland was an 18th-century Anglican bishop in Ireland.

He served as rector of the Church of St Laurence, Stanwick in Northamptonshire from 1731 for an unknown period.

He was nominated Bishop of Clonfert and Kilmacduagh on 19 April 1763 and consecrated on 19 June that year; and translated to Kilmore on 6 March 1772. He died in office in November 1774 and was buried in the grounds of Kilmore Cathedral on 22 November 1774. He was a grandson of Richard Cumberland, and married Johanna Bentley, daughter of Richard Bentley. Their daughter was Mary Alcock. Their son was Richard Cumberland (dramatist)

Church of England titles
Preceded by John Oswald	Bishop of Clonfert and Kilmacduagh; 1763–1772	Succeeded by Walter Cope
Preceded by John Cradock	Bishop of Kilmore; 1772– 1774	Succeeded by George Lewis Jones
