= William Henry (priest) =

18th-century priest and academic

William Henry (died 1768) was an Anglo-Irish Anglican priest, who became Dean of Killaloe and Fellow of the Royal Society.

== Life ==
Henry graduated Dublin Master of Arts (MA Dubl) at Trinity College, Dublin in 1748, and Bachelor of Divinity (BD) and Doctor of Divinity (DD) in 1750. He was the friend and chaplain to Josiah Hort, through whom he was collated to the benefice of Killesher in County Fermanagh, 1 October 1731. He later became rector of Urney, County Tyrone, in 1734.

Henry was elected Fellow of the Royal Society of London on 20 February 1755, and became Dean of Killaloe 29 November 1761. His promotion as dean he owed to the patronage of the Shelburnes, John Petty, 1st Earl of Shelburne and William Petty, 2nd Earl of Shelburne, a connection via Hort and the linen manufacture of Ballymote.

Henry died in Dublin on 13 Feb. 1768, and was interred at St. Ann's Church, Dawson Street there. He was an advocate for temperance, and for civil and religious liberty.

== Works ==
Henry had three of his papers, read before the Royal Society, published in the Philosophical Transactions, one being The Copper Springs in County Wicklow (1753). A Description of Lough Erne in Ireland was edited by Charles King (Dublin, 1892), from manuscript.

At least twelve of Henry's sermons were printed. He also wrote pamphlets against the Jacobites, and Charles Lucas. He used the pseudonym "W. Hiberno-Britannus".

== Family ==
Henry's wife survived him. Remarrying with Surgeon Doyle of Dublin whom she also survived, she died in February or March 1793.

== Sources ==
This article incorporates text from a publication now in the public domain: Stephen, Leslie; Lee, Sidney, eds. (1891). "Henry, William (d.1768)". Dictionary of National Biography. Vol. 26. London: Smith, Elder & Co.
