= Bishop of Ferns and Leighlin =

Diocese in the Province of Dublin, Ireland

The Bishop of Ferns and Leighlin was the Ordinary of Church of Ireland diocese of Ferns and Leighlin in the Province of Dublin. The diocese comprised all of counties Wexford and Carlow and part of counties Wicklow and Laois in Ireland.

The Episcopal see was a union of the bishoprics of Ferns and Leighlin which were united in 1597. Over two hundred and thirty-eight years, there were twenty-nine bishops of the united diocese. Under the Church Temporalities (Ireland) Act 1833 (3 & 4 Will. 4. c. 37), Ferns and Leighlin were combined with Ossory to form the united bishopric of Ossory, Ferns and Leighlin on 12 July 1835.

== List of Bishops of Ferns and Leighlin ==
Bishops of Ferns and Leighlin
From	Until	Incumbent	Notes
1597	1599	Hugh Allen	Appointed Bishop of Ferns in 1582; he became bishop of Ferns and Leighlin when the two dioceses were united in 1597; died at Fethard-on-Sea in 1599
1600		Robert Grave	Formerly Dean of Cork; nominated 30 April and appointed by letters patent 17 July 1600; he was consecrated at Christ Church Cathedral, Dublin in August 1600; on returning to his diocese by sea, he and all his family were drowned in Dublin Bay on 1 October 1600
1601	1604	Nicholas Stafford	Formerly Chancellor of Ferns; nominated 16 January and consecrated 18 March 1601; died 15 November 1604 and buried at St Mary's Church, Wexford
1605	1634	Thomas Ram	Formerly Dean of Ferns; nominated 6 February and consecrated 2 May 1605; died in Dublin on 24 November 1634 and was buried in his own private chapel at Gorey, County Wexford
1635	1648	George Andrews	Formerly Dean of Limerick; nominated 11 January and appointed by letters patent 8 May 1635; consecrated at St Patrick's Cathedral, Dublin 14 May 1635; he was forced to flee to England because of the Irish Rebellion of 1641; died in October 1648 and buried at St Clement's Church, Eastcheap, London
1648	1661	See vacant	
1661	1666	Robert Price	He was Dean of Connor 1640–1660, where he suffered grievously in the Irish Rebellion of 1641; nominated bishop 6 August 1660 and appointed by letters patent 25 January 1661; consecrated 27 January and enthroned 5 April 1661; died in Dublin 26 March 1666 and buried in St Patrick's Cathedral, Dublin
1667	1683	Richard Boyle	Formerly Dean of Limerick; nominated 2 May and consecrated 10 June 1666; died in Old Leighlin circa January 1683 and buried in Leighlin Cathedral
1683	1691	Narcissus Marsh	Formerly Provost of Trinity College Dublin; nominated 9 February and consecrated 6 May 1683; translated to Cashel 26 February 1691
1691	1722	Bartholomew Vigors	Formerly Rector of Wexford and Dean of Armagh; nominated 25 December 1690 and consecrated 8 March 1691; died 3 January 1722 and buried St Patrick's Cathedral, Dublin
1722	1727	Josiah Hort	Formerly Dean of Ardagh; nominated 17 January and consecrated 25 February 1722; translated to Kilmore and Ardagh 27 July 1727
1727	1730	John Hoadly	Formerly Archdeacon of Salisbury; nominated 22 June and consecrated 3 September 1727; translated to Dublin 13 January 1730; his brother was Benjamin Hoadly who was bishop of Bangor, Hereford, Salisbury, and finally Winchester
1730	1734	Arthur Price	Translated from Clonfert and Kilmacduagh; nominated and appointed by letters patent 26 May 1730; translated to Meath 2 February 1734
1734	1740	Edward Synge	Translated from Cloyne; nominated 18 January and appointed by letters patent 8 February 1734; translated to Elphin 15 May 1740
1740	1743	George Stone	Formerly Dean of Derry; nominated 12 May and consecrated 3 August 1740; translated to Kildare 19 May 1743
1743	1744	William Cottrell	Formerly Dean of Raphoe; nominated 15 February and consecrated 19 June 1743; died in England on 21 June 1744
1744	1752	Robert Downes	Formerly Dean of Derry; nominated 14 July and consecrated 19 August 1744; translated to Down and Connor 13 October 1752; his father was Henry Downes, Bishop of Derry
1752	1758	John Garnet	Nominated 12 August and consecrated 12 November 1752; translated to Clogher 4 April 1758
1758		Hon. William Carmichael	Translated from Clonfert and Kilmacduagh; nominated 17 March and appointed by letters patent 5 April 1758; translated to Meath 8 June 1758; his father was the second Earl of Hyndford
1758	1759	Thomas Salmon	Nominated 30 May and consecrated 11 June 1758; died in Tiverton, Devon on 19 March 1759
1759	1761	Richard Robinson	Translated from Killala and Achonry; nominated 27 March and appointed by letters patent 19 April 1759; translated to Kildare 13 April 1761
1761	1765	Charles Jackson	Nominated 20 March and consecrated 19 April 1761; translated to Kildare 25 February 1765
1765	1772	Edward Young	Translated from Dromore; nominated 8 February and appointed by letters patent 4 March 1765; died of Pleurisy in Dublin on 29 August 1772
1772	1782	Hon. Joseph Deane Bourke	Formerly Dean of Dromore; nominated 7 September and consecrated 11 October 1772; translated to Tuam 8 August 1782, and later also became the 3rd Earl of Mayo in 1792
1782	1787	Walter Cope	Translated from Clonfert and Kilmacduagh; nominated 26 July and appointed by letters patent 9 August 1782; died in Dromally, County Armagh on 31 July 1787
1787	1789	William Preston	Translated from Killala and Achonry; nominated 10 September and appointed by letters patent 9 November 1787; died in Dublin 19 April 1789 and buried in Ferns Cathedral
1789	1809	Euseby Cleaver	Translated from Cork and Ross; nominated 5 June and appointed by letters patent 13 June 1789; during the Rebellion of 1798 the bishop's palace, library and other property were destroyed; translated Dublin 25 August 1809
1809	1820	Hon. Percy Jocelyn	Formerly Treasurer of Cork and Archdeacon of Ross; nominated 31 July and consecrated 13 September 1809; translated Clogher 3 April 1820; his father was the second Earl of Roden
1820	1822	Lord Robert Ponsonby Tottenham Loftus	Translated from Killaloe and Kilfenora; nominated 3 April and appointed by letters patent 5 May 1820; translated to Clogher 21 December 1822; his father was the first Marquess of Ely
1822	1835	Thomas Elrington	Translated from Limerick, Ardfert and Aghadoe; nominated 26 November and appointed by letters patent 21 December 1822; died in Liverpool 12 July 1835 and buried in Trinity College Chapel, Dublin
In 1835, the see became part of the united bishopric of Ossory, Ferns and Leighlin

== See also ==
- Bishop of Ferns
- Bishop of Leighlin
