= Robert O'Loughlin =

Dean of Dromore

Robert Stuart O’Loughlin (1852–1925) was Dean of Dromore from 1905 to his death and also wrote widely on religious matters.
