= Dean of Killaloe and Clonfert =

Church of Ireland official

The Dean of Killaloe is based at the Cathedral Church of St Flannan in Killaloe in the united diocese of Limerick, Killaloe and Ardfert within the Church of Ireland. The Dean of Killaloe is also Dean of St Brendans, Clonfert, Dean of Kilfenora, and both Dean and Provost of Kilmacduagh.

Since 2020 the incumbent is Roderick Lindsay Smyth.

== Deans of Killaloe ==
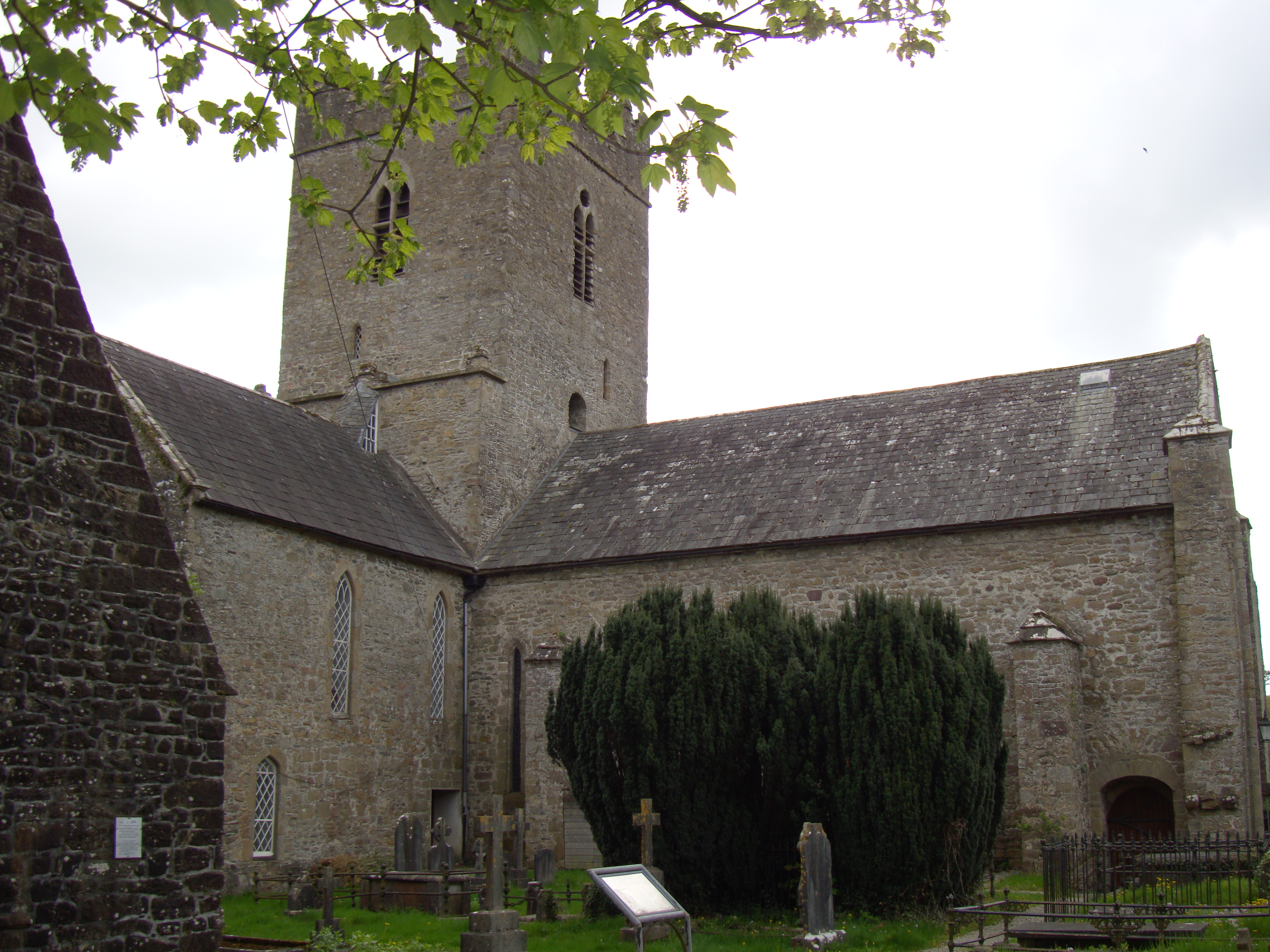
St Flannan's Cathedral, Killaloe

- 1602–1624 Hugh O'Hogan
- 1624–>1627 Richard Hacket
- 1628 Alexander Spicer
- 1637–1643 John Parker
- 1643–1649 John Parker (son of above, deprived 1649 but later appointed Bishop of Elphin, 1660)
- Interregnum
- 1661 Jasper Pheasant
- 1692–1699 Jerome Ryves (afterwards Dean of St Patrick's Cathedral, 1699)
- 1699–1727 James Abbadie (also known as Jakob Abbadie, writer)
- 1727–1749 Giles Eyre
- 1750–1761 Hon Charles Talbot Blayney, 8th Baron Blayney
- 1761–1768 William Henry
- 1768–1772 Hon Joseph Deane Bourke (afterwards Dean of Dromore, 1772 and later Bishop of Ferns and Leighlin)
- 1772–1780 William Cecil Pery (afterwards Dean of Derry, 1780)
- 1780–1781 Samuel Rastall
- 1781–1787 Hon Thomas Stopford (afterwards Dean of Ferns, 1787)
- 1787–1790 John Murray
- 1790–1808 Peter Carleton
- 1808–1828 John Bayly (afterwards Dean of Lismore, 1828)
- 1828–1830 Allen Morgan
- 1830–1871 John Head
- 1871–1880 James Hastings Allen
- 1880–1886 Joseph Frederick Robbins
- 1886–1917 Robert Humphries
- 1917–? Henry John Gillespie
- 1936–1943 Robert McNeil Boyd (afterwards Bishop of Killaloe and Kilfenora, 1943)
- 1957–1972 Edwin Owen (afterwards Bishop of Killaloe and Clonfert, 1972)

For Deans of Killaloe and Clonfert see below

== Deans of Clonfert ==
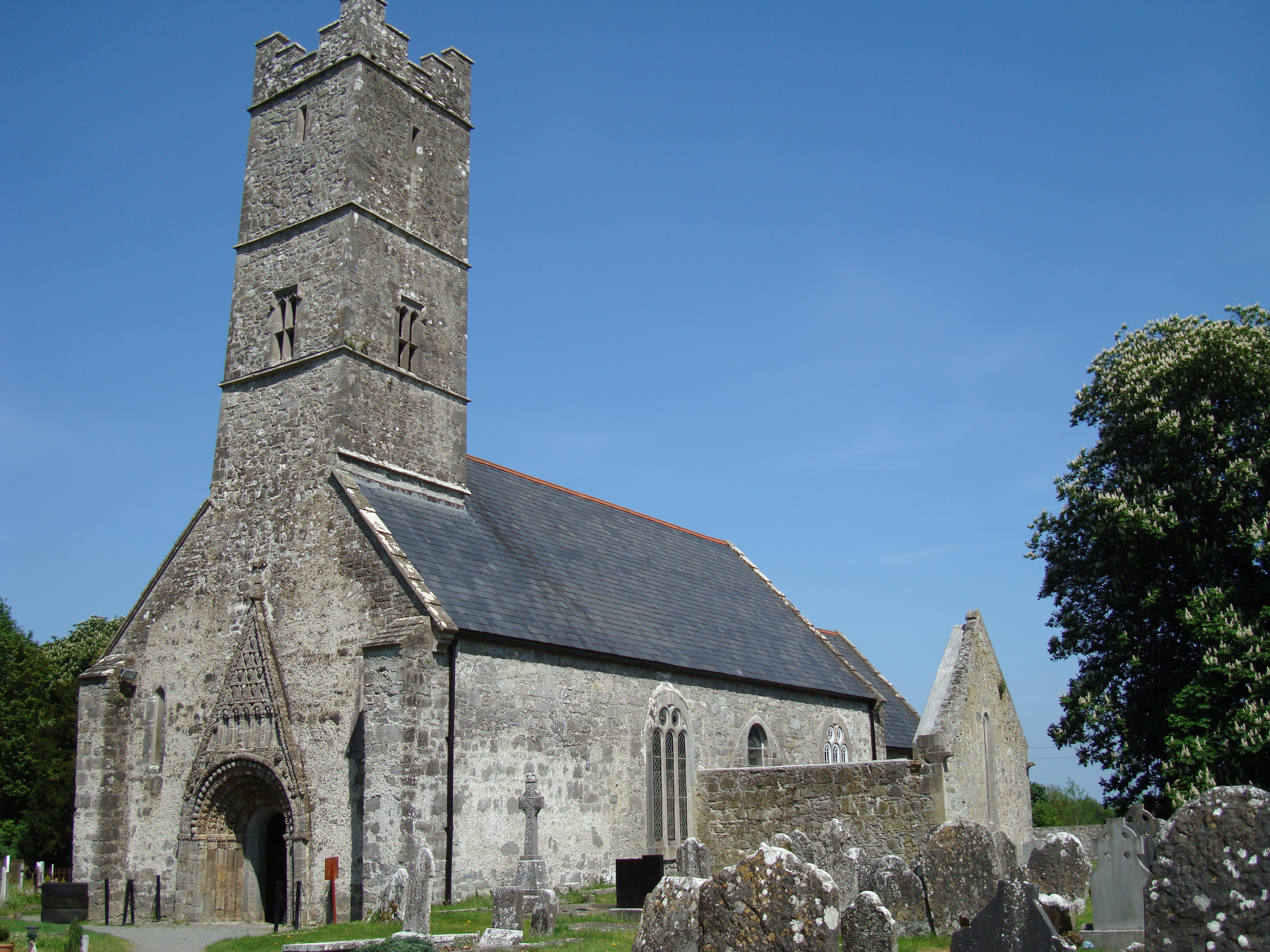
St Brendan's Cathedral, Clonfert

- 1308 Gregory O'Brogan
- 1319 James
- 13??-1392 Michael (or Nicholas) O'Kelly died
- 1407–1438 Thomas O'Longain
- 1460–1470 Simon McKeogh
- 1534 Roland de Burgo (made Bishop of Clonfert 1541 but remained Dean in commendam; died 1580)
- c1591 Donat O'Lorchan
- 1597/8 Arilan Loughlin
- 1622–1627 Revatius (or Ryvas) Tully
- 1627/8 Robert Mawe
- 1638 Samuel Pullein (fled to England, 1641, later Archbishop of Tuam, 1661)
- Interregnum
- 1661/2–1666 Richard Heaton
- 1666 Nicholas Proude
- 1669/70 Joshua Brooksbank
- 1692–1726 John Burdett
- 1726–1745 Robert Taylour
- 1745–1766 William Crowe
- 1766–1812 William Digby
- 1812–1850 Thomas Hawkins
- 1850–1864 Robert Mitchell Kennedy
- 1864–1866 Charles Graves (afterwards Bishop of Limerick, Ardfert and Aghadoe 1866)
- 1866–?1897 James Byrne (died 1897)
- ?–?1906 Philip Graydon Tibbs (died 1906)
- 1926–1942 Le Bel Holbrooke Edward ffrench

== Deans of Killaloe, Clonfert, Kilfenora and Kilmacduagh ==
- 1972-1986 Francis Robert Bourke
- 1987-1995 Ernon Cope Todd Perdue
- 1996-2001 Nicholas Marshall Cummins
- 2002–2012 Stephen Ross White
- 2013–2021 Gary Paulsen
- 2021–present Roderick Lindsay Smyth
