= Upper Cumberworth =

Village in West Yorkshire, England

Coordinates: 53.576°N 1.682°W

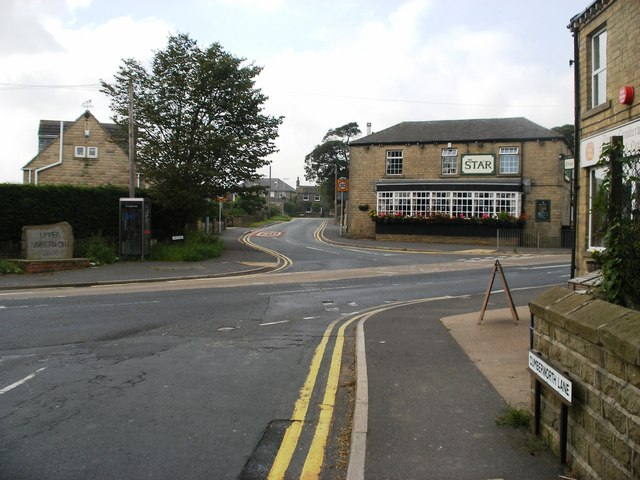
- Crossroads, Upper Cumberworth

- Location within West Yorkshire
- Population: 1,122 (2001 Census)
- OS grid reference: SE212088
- Metropolitan borough: Kirklees
- Metropolitan county: West Yorkshire
- Region: Yorkshire and the Humber
- Country: England
- Sovereign state: United Kingdom
- Post town: HUDDERSFIELD
- Postcode district: HD8
- Dialling code: 01484
- Police: West Yorkshire
- Fire: West Yorkshire
- Ambulance: Yorkshire
- UK Parliament: Ossett and Denby Dale

Upper Cumberworth is a small village in West Yorkshire, England, within the civil parish of Denby Dale and the Diocese of Wakefield. It is between the villages of Denby Dale and Shepley, above the village of Lower Cumberworth. It occupies a rural location, surrounded by fields and woodland but close to Barnsley, Wakefield, Huddersfield and Sheffield by public transport or road.

The 2001 Census gave the population of Upper Cumberworth and Lower Cumberworth combined as 1,222.

Historically Upper Cumberworth is part of the West Riding of Yorkshire in the Wapentake of Staincross in the ancient parish of Silkstone. The Wapentake almost corresponds with the current Barnsley Metropolitan Area, although a few settlements and townships within the Staincross Wapentake such as Upper Cumberworth were put outside the Metropolitan Borough of Barnsley and now lie within the current West Yorkshire Metropolitan Area since April 1974.

The name Cumberworth derives from the Old English Cumbreworð meaning 'Cumbre's enclosure' or 'the enclosure of the Cumbrians'.

== Geography ==
The local woodlands are managed by the Upper Dearne Woodlands Conservation Group, who undertake tasks such as habitat conservation, access management, education and information. Many public footpaths run through the woodlands with information boards about plants and animals. The woodland runs into Birdsedge and contains more than 75 Hairy Northern Wood Ant (Formica lugubris) nests.

== Education ==
The village has a small first school, Cumberworth CE (VA) First School.

== Religious sites ==
The local Saint Nicholas' church is Anglican. The churchyard has a set of stocks by the entrance and some sculptural gravestones.

== Sport ==
Upper Cumberworth and Lower Cumberworth have joint football and cricket teams. There is a small children's playground and a larger field which contains football and basketball facilities.

== Notable people ==
John Hodgson, drummer/ percussionist with Rick Wakeman's English Rock Ensemble and Violinski, an ELO offshoot.

== See also ==
- Listed buildings in Denby Dale
