= Raphael Walsh =

Anglican priest

Raphael Walsh was an Anglican priest in Ireland in the second half of the 18th Century and the first decade of the 19th.

Wight was born in Dublin and educated at Trinity College, Dublin. He was Dean of Dromore from 1790 until his death in 1808; and Archdeacon of Limerick from 1790 until his resignation in 1803.

His nephew was the Irish landowner and M.P. John Allen Johnson-Walsh.
