= Henry Leslie (dean of Dromore) =

Anglican priest

Henry Leslie, D.D. (1651-1733) was an Anglican priest in Ireland in the late seventeenth and early 18th centuries.

Mathews was born in County Down on 4 November 1651 and educated at Trinity College, Dublin. He was Archdeacon of Down from 1695 until his death on 3 September 1733; and Dean of Dromore from February 5, 1722 to February 16, 1722, ostensibly to test a clause in the right of presentation.
