= Henry Stewart (cricketer) =

English cricketer

Henry Stewart (born 5 August 1763, at Hambledon, Hampshire; died 12 March 1837, at Hambledon) was an English amateur cricketer who made 3 known appearances in important matches from 1788 to 1806.

== Career ==
He was mainly associated with Hampshire.

== External sources ==
- CricketArchive record
