= Peter Needham (scholar) =

English classical scholar (1680–1731)

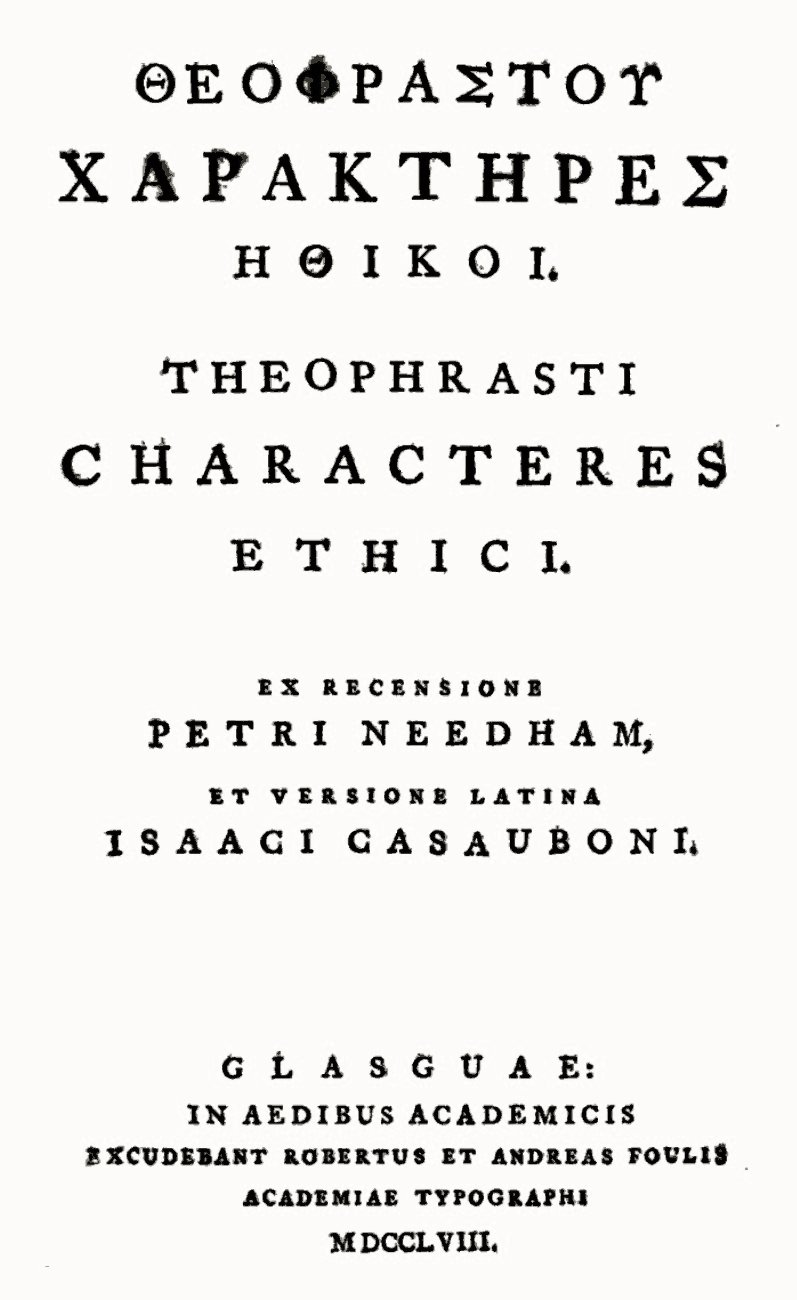
Title page, Glasgow 1758 reprint, of Peter Needham's edition of the Characters of Theophrastus

Peter Needham (1680–1731) was an English classical scholar and cleric.

== Life ==
Born at Stockport, he was son of the Rev. Samuel Needham, who kept a private school at Bradenham, Norfolk, and then was appointed master of Stockport grammar school. He attended his father's school at Bradenham.

Needham matriculated at St John's College, Cambridge, on 18 April 1693. He was elected Billingsley scholar in 1693 on the same day as Ambrose Philips became a foundation scholar, and he was a Fellow of his college from 12 April 1698 until March 1716. He graduated B.A. in 1696, M.A. in 1700, B.D. in 1707, and D.D. in 1717.

In 1706 Needham left Cambridge to become rector of Ovington, Norfolk. He was appointed vicar of Madingley in 1711, and rector both of Whitton, Suffolk cum Thurleston and Conington, Cambridgeshire, in 1713. In the following year a prebend in the church of St. Florence, Pembrokeshire, was conferred on him, and in 1717 the rectory of Stanwick, Northamptonshire. He rebuilt The Old Rectory, Stanwick, and died there on 6 December 1731.

== Works ==
A scholar of Latin and Greek, praised by contemporaries, Needham published three editions:

- Γεοπονικά. Geoponicorum sive de re rustica libri xx., Cassiano Basso Scholastico Collectore, antea Constantino Porphyrogesmeto a quibusdam adscripti. Gr. et Lat. cum notis et emendationibus. Cantab. Typis Academicis. Impensis A. et J. Churchill Bibliopolarum Londinensium, 1704. This edition of the Geoponica, a Byzantine work on agriculture, was dedicated to John Moore. Thomas Hearne complained of Needham's failure to acknowledge in it the help that he derived from Oxford libraries, but they remained on good terms, despite political differences.
- Hieroclis philosophi Alexandrini Commentarius in Aurea Carmina de Providentia et Fato quæ supersunt et reliqua fragmenta Græce et Latine. Græca cum MSS. collata castigavit versionem recensuit notas et Indicem adjecit Pet. Needham. Cantab. Typis Academicis. Impensis A. et J. Churchill Bibliopolarum Londinensium, 1709, dedicated to William Cowper, 1st Earl Cowper. An edition of the commentary on The golden verses of Pythagoras by Hierocles of Alexandria. Richard Bentley is said to have supplied some of the notes.
- Θεουφραστου Χαρακτηρες Ηθικοι. Theophrasti Characteres Ethici Græce et Latine, Cantab. Typ. Acad., printer Cornelius Crownfield, 1712. Edition of the Characters of Theophrastus, with the notes of Isaac Casaubon, and the Prælectiones of James Duport, which Needham printed for the first time. It extended to nearly five hundred pages, and was dedicated to John Moore. This edition was reissued at Glasgow by Robert Foulis in 1743, 1748, and 1785, without the Prælectiones.

Needham also worked over the texts of Æschylus, and his manuscript collections were used by Anthony Askew, Samuel Butler, and Charles James Blomfield in their editions of the dramatist. Bernard de Montfaucon, the Benedictine editor of John Chrysostom (1718), fulsomely acknowledged assistance from Needham.

== Notes ==
Attribution

This article incorporates text from a publication now in the public domain: Lee, Sidney, ed. (1894). "Needham, Peter". Dictionary of National Biography. Vol. 40. London: Smith, Elder & Co.
