= Andrew Moneypenny =

Andrew Moneypenny was an Irish Anglican churchman in the seventeenth century.

He was appointed Archdeacon of Connor in 1617 and a prebendary of Down Cathedral in 1620.
