= Theophilus Campbell =

Dean of Dromore

Theophilus Fitzhardinge Campbell (1811-1894) was Dean of Dromore from 1887 to 1894.

He was educated at Trinity College, Dublin, graduating in 1838; and his first post was a curacy at Munterconnaught. He held incumbencies in Tunstall, Belfast and Finvoy. In 1886, he became Archdeacon of Dromore.
