= Henry Stuart =

Henry Stuart may refer to:

== Members of the Royal House of Stuart ==
- Henry Stuart, Lord Darnley (1545–1567), King Consort of Scotland, cousin and second husband of Mary, Queen of Scots, father of James VI of Scotland
- Henry Frederick, Prince of Wales (1594–1612), elder brother of Charles I of England and Prince of Wales from 1603 to 1612
- Henry Benedict Stuart (1725–1807), known as Cardinal Duke of York and King Henry IX, younger brother of Bonnie Prince Charlie
- Henry Stuart, Duke of Gloucester (1640–1660), Protestant younger brother of Charles II and James II of England

== Others ==
- Henry Stuart (MP) (1804–1854), English MP for Bedford
- Henry Stuart (priest) (1864–1933), Anglican Dean of Carlisle
- Henry Carter Stuart (1855–1933), early twentieth century governor of Virginia
- Henry Stuart (actor) (1885–1942), British-Swiss film actor
- Henry Stuart (Australian politician) (1853–1910), New South Wales politician

== See also ==
- Henry Stewart (disambiguation)
