= Henry Stewart (archdeacon of Dromore) =

Irish Anglican priest

Henry Stewart, D.D. was an Anglican priest in Ireland in the nineteenth century.

Stewart was born in Dublin and educated at Trinity College, Dublin. He was ordained in 1861. After two curacies he became Rector of Kilmore, County Down in 1866. From 1870 he was the incumbent at Seapatrick; and from 1879 Archdeacon of Dromore.
