= Edward Young (bishop) =

English Anglican priest

Edward Young was an English Anglican priest in the eighteenth century: his senior posts were in Ireland.

Young was educated at Eton College and Trinity College, Cambridge. He was Chaplain to George Montagu-Dunk, 2nd Earl of Halifax, the Lord Lieutenant of Ireland who appointed him to the Deanery of Clogher in 1761. In 1763 he became Bishop of Dromore. in 1765 he was translated to Ferns.

He died in post at Ferns on 24 August 1772.
