= Jemmett Browne =

Anglo-Irish bishop

The Right Reverend and Right Honourable Jemmett Browne PC (Ire)
- Archbishop of Tuam
- Province: Province of Tuam
- Installed: 1775
- Term ended: 1782
- Predecessor: John Ryder
- Successor: Joseph Bourke
- Other posts: Bishop of Killaloe (1743–1745); Bishop of Dromore (1745); Bishop of Cork and Ross (1745–1772); Bishop of Elphin (1772–1775)

Orders
- Ordination: 29 December 1723
- Consecration: 9 October 1743 by Theophilus Bolton

Personal details
- Born: c. 1703 Cork
- Died: 9 June 1782 Tuam
- Buried: Tuam
- Denomination: Church of Ireland

Jemmett Browne (c. 1703 – 9 June 1782) was the Church of Ireland Bishop of Killaloe from 1743 to 1745, Bishop of Dromore for three months in the middle of 1745, Bishop of Cork and Ross from 1745 to 1772, Bishop of Elphin from 1772 to 1775, and finally Archbishop of Tuam from 1775 until his death in 1782.

Of a family seated at Riverstown in County Cork, Browne was descended from an Englishman named Thomas Browne who had settled in the city of Cork about 1660. Born at Cork, the name Jemmett came from the family of his mother, Judith, daughter of Warham Jemmett. His father, Edward Browne, was Mayor of Cork in 1714. He was educated at Westminster School and Trinity College, Dublin. On 29 December 1723 was ordained a priest of the Church of Ireland by his relation (through his wife) Bishop Peter Browne. He was appointed Treasurer of Ross in February 1723/24, Vicar Choral of Cork on 14 July 1724, Precentor of Cork on 13 February 1724/25, and Prebendary of Cork in 1732. He then served for ten years as Dean of Ross, 1733–1743.

In 1733 Browne married Alice, a daughter of Thomas Waterhouse, and had sons named Edward (Archdeacon of Ross) and Thomas (a priest).

Browne is appreciated for architectural and decorative patronage of work undertaken at Riverstown House.

Browne was a friend of Laurence Sterne, who noted in A Sentimental Journey Through France and Italy (1768) that "the Bishop of Cork and Ross has made me great offers in Ireland."

== Publications ==
- Jemmett Browne, A letter from a clrgyman [sic] of the diocess of Cork, to his friend in Dublin, relating the conduct of the Bishop of Cork, in the degradation of Mr. Dallas (printed by M. Pilkington, 1749)
