= Samuel Pullen =

Samuel Pullen (also Pullein and Pulleyne) (1598–1667) was the Church of Ireland archbishop of Tuam in Ireland.

== Biography ==
Samuel Pullen was the son of William Pullein, rector of Ripley, Yorkshire. Born in Ripley in 1598, he commenced M.A. at Pembroke Hall, Cambridge, 1623, and in 1624 was appointed the first master, under the second endowment, of the Leeds Grammar School, and lecturer in the parish church. In both offices he was succeeded in 1630 by his brother Joshua Pullen (d. 1657), father of Tobias Pullen. Joshua continued as master until 1651.

Samuel accompanied the Marquis of Ormonde to Ireland as private chaplain in 1632. He was installed a prebendary of the diocese of Ossory on 5 June 1634, appointed rector of Knockgraffon, Tipperary, and chancellor of Cashel in 1636. On 14 November 1638 he was created dean of Clonfert in Galway. On the outbreak of the Catholic rebellion in October 1641, Pullen, who was then living in Cashel, Tipperary, was plundered of all his goods, to the value of four or five thousand pounds, and, with his wife and children, only escaped murder by the protection of a Jesuit father named James Saul, who sheltered him for three months. On his escape to England, Pullen became chaplain to Aubrey de Vere, 20th Earl of Oxford. Invited by the Countess of Oxford to hear a sermon of a popular Puritan preacher, an alleged shoemaker, Pullen recognised in the preacher his former benefactor, the Jesuit, in disguise. Pullen contrived that Saul should quit Oxfordshire without exposure.

Pullen was collated on 28 October 1642 to a prebend in St. Patrick's Cathedral, Dublin which he held until the Restoration, when he was incorporated D.D. of Dublin, and, through the Duke of Ormonde's influence, elevated to the see of Tuam, with that of Kilfenoragh (19 January 1661). He died on 24 January 1667, and was buried in the cathedral at Tuam.

Pullen married, first, on 8 June 1624, Anne (d. 1631), daughter of Robert Cooke, B.D., vicar of Leeds, by whom he had three sons, Samuel, Alexander, and William. Pullen's second wife was a sister of Archbishop John Bramhall.
