= Josiah Hort =

English clergyman

Josiah Hort (c. 1674 – 14 December 1751), was an English clergyman of the Church of Ireland who ended his career as archbishop of Tuam.

Born in Marshfield, Gloucestershire, son of John Hort, and brought up as a Nonconformist, Hort went to school with the hymn writer Isaac Watts, who was his lifelong friend. He began as a Nonconformist minister, but then conformed to the Church of England, attending Clare College, Cambridge, though its not clear if he ever graduated. He was appointed in turn to the parishes of Wicken in East Anglia and Wendover in Buckinghamshire.

In 1709 Hort went to Ireland to serve as chaplain for Thomas Wharton, 1st Marquess of Wharton, Lord-Lieutenant of Ireland, and obtained a parish there, which he couldn't take up for several years pending litigation. In the meantime, he was granted the rectory of Haversham, Buckinghamshire.

After two deaneries (Cloyne (1718–1720) and Ardagh (1720–1721)) and two bishoprics (Ferns (1721–1727) and Kilmore & Ardagh (1727–1742)), he became Archbishop of Tuam (1742–1751). He also served for a period as a preacher and a volume of his sermons on "practical subjects" went through several editions. Because the rise of the English clergy was unpopular in Ireland, Dean Jonathan Swift, launched a violent attack on him in a satirical poem. Later on, Swift became friendly toward Hort.

One bond between the two men was their shared antipathy to Richard Bettesworth, King's Serjeant and member of the Irish House of Commons for Midleton. Both Swift and Hore regarded Bettesworth, who was a Presbyterian, as dangerously anti-clerical, due to his support in Parliament for various measures which they feared would weaken the Established Church, and both wrote satirical attacks on him. Hort's satire was entitled "A new proposal for the better regulation and improvement of quadrille". It proposed that all disputes about the playing of the card game quadrille should be laid before Bettesworth, but with a right of appeal to a wooden figure called the Upright Man, which hung in Essex Street, and which had never given a corrupt judgment. Hort arranged for it to be printed by the leading Irish publisher George Faulkner. Unable to attack Hort directly, Bettesworth retaliated by having Faulkner imprisoned in Newgate for libel on an MP, a common enough sanction at the time. Faulkner obtained his freedom after two days with an apology; Swift suggested that Hort pay his legal expenses.

In his will Hort exhorted his children to carry out his intentions "without having recourse to law and the subtility of lawyers", and in the case of difficulty to refer questions to "the decision of persons of known probity and wisdom, this being not only the most Christian, but the most prudent and cheap and summary way of deciding all differences".

== Preaching ==
Hort used his own personal experiences as prefaces to his sermons. After being disabled from preaching by an overstrain of his voice, he warned "all young preachers whose organs of speech are tender", and said, "Experience shows that a moderate Degree of Voice, with a proper and distinct Articulation, is better understood in all Parts of a Church than a Thunder of Lungs that is rarely distinct, and never agreeable to the Audience." His sermons were expressed in simple, dignified language.

== Family ==
He married the Lady Elizabeth FitzMaurice, daughter of William FitzMaurice of Gallane and niece of Thomas FitzMaurice, 1st Earl of Kerry. She was thus the cousin of Lady Arabella Denny. The Horts second son, John, married a woman who belonged to a branch of the Butler family and was appointed consul-General at Lisbon in 1767. That same year he was made a baronet. Sir John Hort was the grandfather of the English theologian Fenton John Anthony Hort and great-grandfather of Richard Garnons Williams, soldier and international rugby player.

Two of Josiah Hort's daughters married into well-known Irish families of that day; Lady Elizabeth (1729–1778) married Sir James Caldwell, 4th Baronet of Castle Caldwell in Co. Fermanagh. Another daughter married John Parker, MP (1734/5 – 1788), owner of Saltram House in Devon, in 1764 but she died that same year.

Josiah Hort is the earliest of the family name of whom any record is preserved. His father, of whom little is known, lived near Bath, England.
