= William Ryder (Archdeacon of Cloyne) =

William Ryder (b Mitchelstown 7 November 1790 – d Queenstown, County Cork 26 May 1862) was Archdeacon of Cloyne from 1834 until his death.

Ryder was educated at Trinity College, Dublin and ordained in 1833. He was ordained deacon on 14 September 1817, and priest on 11 October 1818. After a curacy at Rathcormac, he held incumbencies at Cork, Gortroe and Queenstown.

At Rathcormac, in County Cork, on 18 December 1834, Archdeacon Ryder was having problems collecting tithes. As trouble was expected, he was accompanied by a force of 100 soldiers. When faced with a demonstration by some 250 local people, Ryder ordered the troops to open fire, They killing some twenty people, and wounded others. The event became known as the Rathcormac massacre.
