= Joseph Warner (priest) =

Irish Anglican priest

Joseph Alfred Warner was an Irish Anglican priest.

Warner was educated at Trinity College, Dublin and ordained in 1926. After curacies at Willowfield, Mallow and Cork he held incumbencies at Kilmeen and Castlemartyr before five years as a Chaplain in the RAFVR. When peace returned he held further incumbencies at Midleton and Carrigtwohill. He was Dean of Cloyne from 1952 until 1957; and Archdeacon of Cloyne from 1957 until 1965.

Religious titles
Preceded by Hugh Frederick Berry	Dean of Cloyne; 1952–1957	Succeeded by Phineas Bury
Preceded by Thomas Henry Foorde Russell Buckworth Royse	Archdeacon of Cloyne; 1957–1965	Succeeded by John Desmond Hutchinson
