= Michael Davies (priest) =

Michael Davies (1 August 1694 – 9 June 1779) was Archdeacon of Cloyne from 1742 until his death.

The youngest son of Rowland Davies, Dean of Cork from 1710 to 1721, he was born in Cork and educated at Trinity College, Dublin After a curacy at Youghal he held incumbencies at Kilmahon, Aghinagh and Gortroe.
