= William Wilson (dean of Cloyne) =

Irish Anglican cleric

William Joseph Wilson was the Dean of Cloyne from 1908 to 1934.

He was educated at Trinity College, Dublin; and ordained in 1878. After curacies in Dungourney and Cork he held incumbencies at Corkbeg and Templebreedy until his appointment as Dean.
