= Robert Evans (Archdeacon of Cloyne) =

Robert Maunsell Evans (4 May 1808 – 1 May 1890) was Archdeacon of Cloyne from 1862 until 1873.

Evans was born in County Limerick, educated at Trinity College, Dublin and ordained in 1833. After curacies at Ogonnelloe, Bandon and Ballyhea he became Rector of Gortroe and Dysert before his appointment as Archdeacon.

He died on 1 May 1890.
