= William Bailie =

Scottish emigrant to Ireland (died 1648)

William Bailie (died c. 1648) was a native of Ayrshire, Scotland. In 1610, under the Ulster Plantation, William was given a grant of 1,000 acres (4.0 km^{2}) in the proportion of Toneregie, now Tandragee, in the Barony of Clankee in County Cavan. He built Bailieborough Castle close to what was to become the town of Bailieborough and settled a number of Scottish families in the area. He is credited as the founder of the town of Bailieborough, although the present town did not develop until the 19th century when Colonel William Young of Loughgall, County Armagh owned the estate.

== Family ==
William had two sons William and Robert. His eldest son, William Bailie, became Bishop of Clonfert and Kilmacduagh and inherited his father's estate, which passed through his only daughter Jane into the Hamilton family.
