= Edward Wolley =

Edward Wolley was an Anglican bishop in Ireland in the 17th century; he succeeded William Bailey as Bishop of Clonfert and Kilmacduagh in 1664, and died in 1684.
