= Currabinny =

Currabinny may refer to:

- Curraghbinny, also spelled Currabinny and Currabinney, a townland in County Cork, Ireland
- Currabinny, a food company founded by James Kavanagh and William Murray
