= Dean of Cloyne =

Church of Ireland official

The Dean of Cloyne is based at the Cathedral Church of St Coleman in Cloyne in the Diocese of Cloyne within the united bishopric of Cork, Cloyne and Ross.

The incumbent is Rev. Susan Green.

== List of deans of Cloyne (Church of Ireland) ==
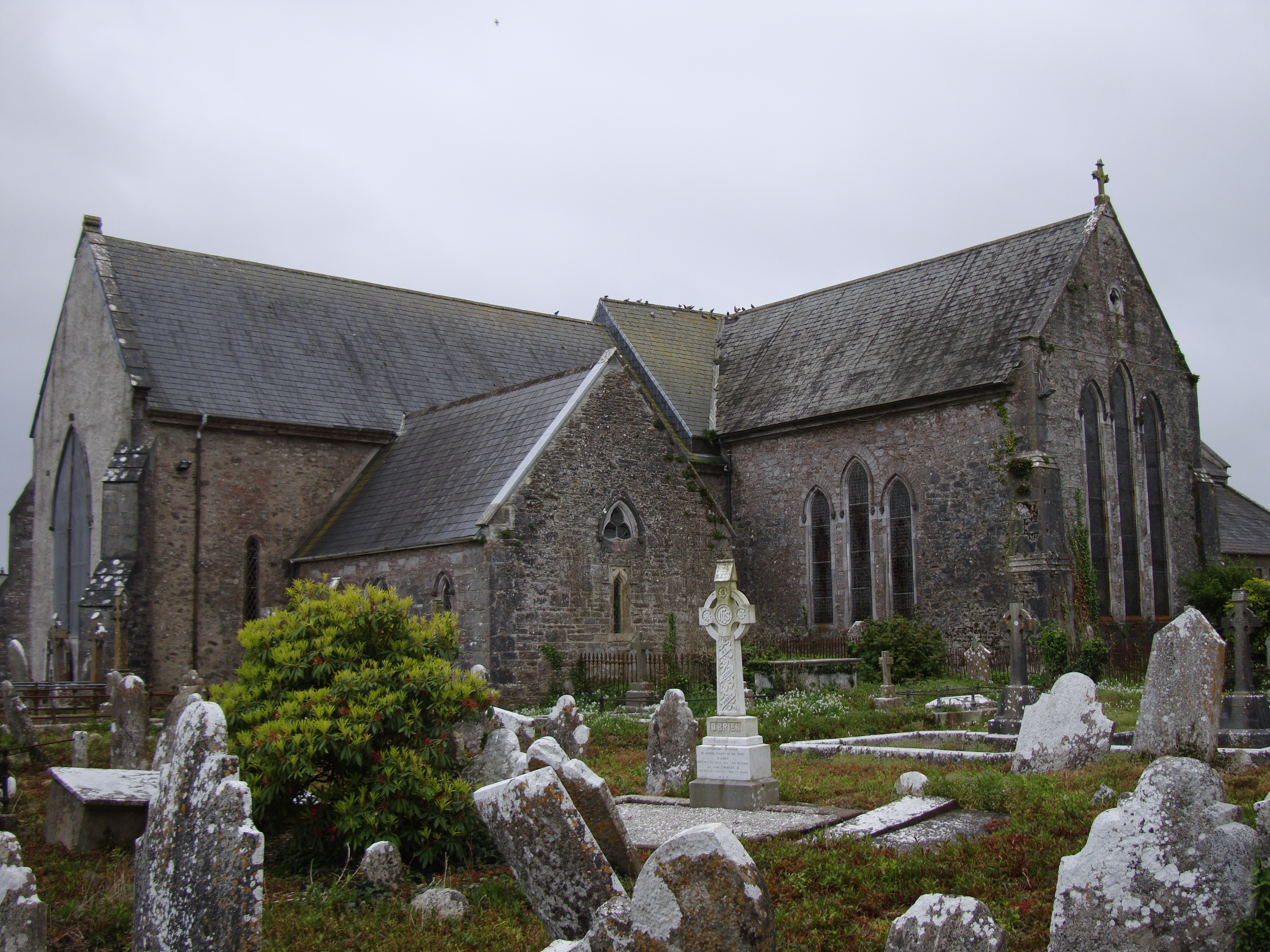
St Coleman's Cathedral, Cloyne

- 1591 John Fitzedmund
- 1612/3–1614 Thomas Winter
- 1615–?1639 Edward Clerke
- 1640–1660 Michael Boyle (afterwards Bishop of Cork, Cloyne and Ross, 1660)
- 1660/1–1671 Henry Rugg
- 1671–1691 William Fitzgerald (afterwards Bishop of Clonfert and Kilmacduagh, 1691)
- 1691–1703/4 Henry Scardeville
- 1703/4 Thomas Deane
- 1714–1714 Robert Sesse
- 1714 Thomas Simcocks
- 1718–1720 Josiah Hort (afterwards Dean of Ardagh, 1720)
- 1720–1726 Henry Maule (afterwards Bishop of Cloyne, 1726)
- 1726–1736 James Ward
- 1736–1769 Isaac Goldsmith
- 1769–1770 William Pratt
- 1770–1779 Eyton Butts
- 1779–1804 Hon John Hewitt, younger son of James Hewitt, 1st Viscount Lifford
- 1804–1815 James Hamilton (astronomer)
- 1816–1823 Alexander Arbuthnot (afterwards Bishop of Killaloe and Kilfenora, 1823)
- 1823–1845 Thomas John Burgh
- 1845–1850 Hervey de Montmorency, 4th Viscount Mountmorres (afterwards Dean of Achonry, 1851)
- 1851–1884 James Howie
- 1884–1909 Horace Fleming
- 1909–1934 William Wilson
- 1934–1952 Hugh Berry
- 1952–1957 Joseph Warner (afterwards Archdeacon of Cloyne, 1957)
- 1957–1973 Phineas Bury
- 1973–1984 John Ridley-Barker
- 1985–2002 George Hilliard
- 2003–2017 Alan Marley
- 2018–present Susan Green
