= Robert Sesse =

Anglican priest

Robert Sesse was an Anglican priest in Ireland in the eighteenth century.

Sesse was born in Dublin and educated at Trinity College there. He was Dean of Cloyne in 1714.
