= Archdeacon of Ross, Ireland =

Province of Dublin
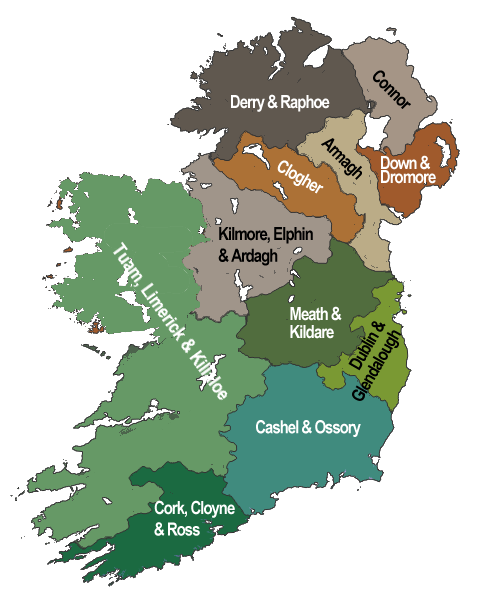
- Church: Church of Ireland
- Metropolitan bishop: Archbishop of Dublin
- Cathedral: Christ Church Cathedral, Dublin
- Dioceses: 5

The Archdeacon of Dean was a senior ecclesiastical officer within the Diocese of Ross until 1835; and then within the Diocese of Cork, Cloyne and Ross until 1972 when it merged with the Archdeaconry of Cork. As such he was responsible for the disciplinary supervision of the clergy within the Ross Diocese.

Details are sketchy until we get to Meredith Hanmer, the first incumbent of whom we have a full biography, to the last discrete holder Dominick Patrick Sarsfield Wilson. In between William Fitzgerald, Percy Jocelyn and William Bissett went on to be bishops.
