= James Mockler =

Catholic Archdeacon in Ireland

James Mockler was Archdeacon of Cloyne from 1779 until his death in 1789.

Mockler was born in Ballyclogh, County Cork and educated at Trinity College, Dublin He was ordained in 1756. After curacies in Bruhenny and Cloyne he held incumbencies at Subulter, Aghinagh, Nathlash, Mallow and Kilmahon. He was Vicar choral of Cloyne Cathedral from 1772 to 1773.
