= Bailieborough Castle =

Former castle in County Cavan, Ireland

Coordinates: 53.9293°N 6.9907°W

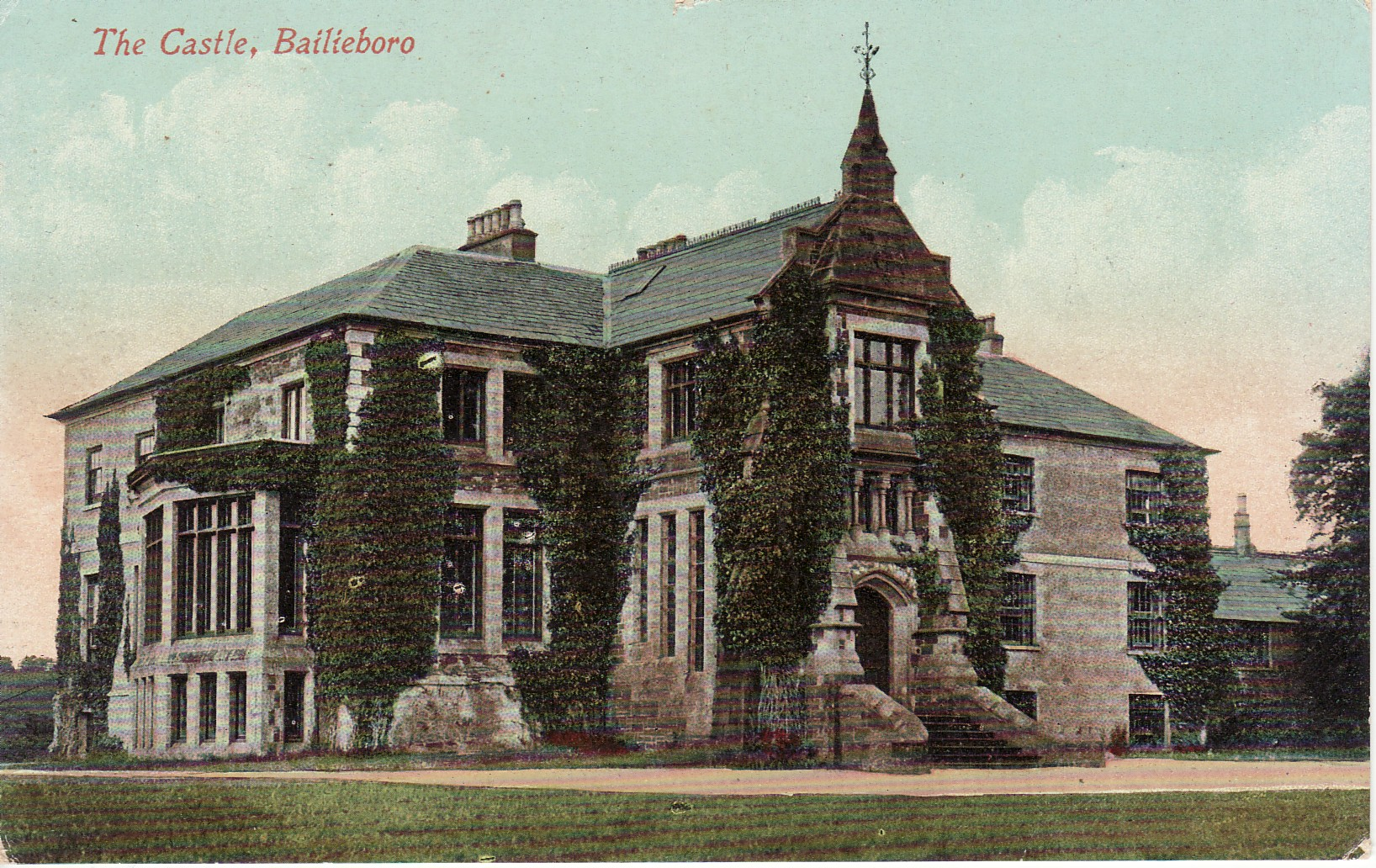
The Castle, Bailieborough

Bailieborough Castle was located in Bailieborough, County Cavan, Ireland. It was built in an enclosed demesne by 1629. Also known as Castle House, Lisgar House, or simply 'The Castle', the country house was located just to the south-west of Castle Lough in what is now known as Bailieborough Demesne, on the north-western edge of the town. It was largely destroyed by fire in the early 20th century and is now totally demolished.

There is a 3-kilometre (1.9 mi) walking trail around part of the former castle's property.

== History ==
William Bailie, a Scottish "undertaker" or planter, was granted the lands of Tonergie (Tandragee) in East Breffnie by King James VI and I in 1610 on condition he enclosed a demesne, built a fortified house and settled on the estate a number of Scottish or English families. This he did by 1629. During the Irish Rebellion of 1641, the house was attacked and occupied for a month by a troop of Irish soldiers under Colonel Hugh O'Reilly.

William Bailie died c.1648 and the estate passed to his son, also William Bailie, the Church of Ireland Bishop of Clonfert and Kilmacduagh. On Bishop Bailie's death in 1664, the estate was inherited by his only daughter Jane, who had married James Hamilton. James was succeeded by his son Henry, MP for County Cavan, who was killed at the Siege of Limerick in 1690, during the Jacobite war. His successor was his son, another James Hamilton, who sold the property in 1724 to Major Charles Stewart - nephew and co-heir of General Sir William Steuart - and left the area.

Charles Stewart died in 1740 and left the estate to his son, William Stewart, who was High Sheriff of Cavan for 1749 and MP for County Cavan (1766–1768). He was followed by his son Charles, who was also MP for Cavan (1783–1793). He was killed in an accident in 1795, when the estate passed to a nephew, Thomas Charles Stewart Corry, who sold it to Colonel William Young, from Loughgall in the north of County Armagh, in 1814.

Colonel Young laid out the town of Bailieborough in its present location and was made the 1st Young Baronet of Bailieborough Castle in 1821. Sir William died in 1848 and was succeeded by his son, Sir John Young, who was at one time Chief Secretary for Ireland and, at a later date, Governor General of Canada. He was made 1st Baron Lisgar in 1870 and, in his retirement, renovated the house prior to his death in 1876. After Lady Lisgar's death in 1895, the estate went into Chancery and some of the land was sold to the tenants under the Purchase of Land (Ireland) Act 1885.

The house itself was sold to Sir Stanley Cochrane, who later sold it to one of his nephews, W. L. B. Cochrane, a Bailieborough solicitor. The bulk of the land was sold in 1910 to the Forestry Division of the Department of Lands. In 1915, the house and the remaining 100 acres of land were sold to a religious order, the Marist Brothers of Athlone. Several of the brothers are buried in a walled enclosure in the vicinity. In 1918, the house burnt down and although the brothers continued in a rebuilt section until 1936, they then decided to sell the house to the Department of Lands and leave. The house was demolished soon after.

== Walking trail ==
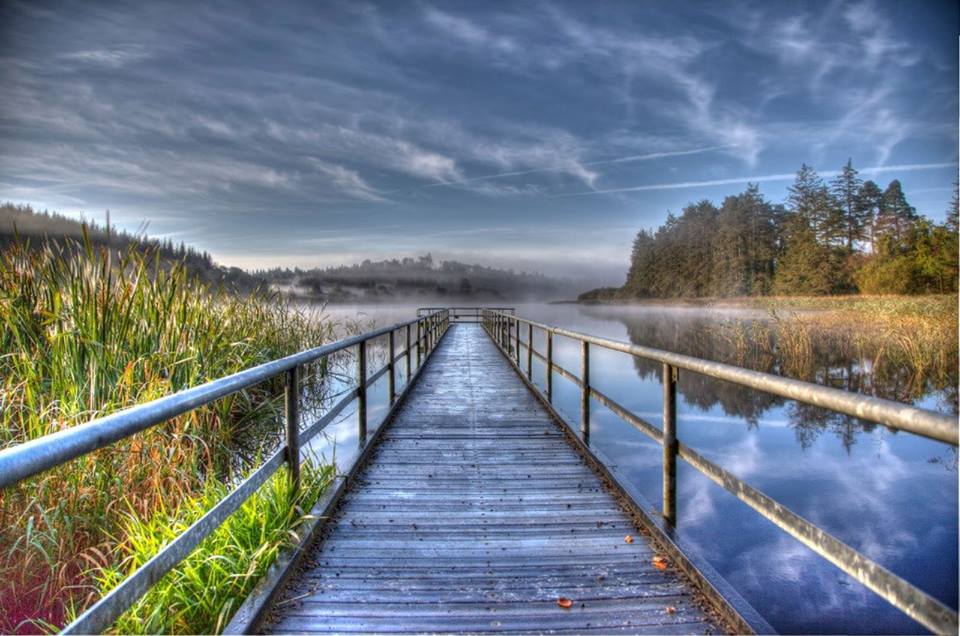
Jetty on Castle Lake

A 3-kilometre (1.9 mi) tourist trail, known as the 'Castle Lake loop', routes around Castle Lake and into Castle Lake Forest. The route, which is suitable for cycling or walking, begins and ends at the car park on the lakeshore. It passes the graves of the Marist brothers who occupied Bailieborough Castle for a time before its eventual demolition.
