= Desmond Hutchinson =

Irish clergyman

John Desmond Hutchinson (27 February 1917 – 11 January 1995 ) was a Church of Ireland clergyman who was Archdeacon of Cloyne from 1965 until 1967, and then of Cork from 1972 until 1986.

Hutchinson was born in South Dublin. He was educated at Trinity College, Dublin and ordained in 1946. After a curacy in Maryborough, he was a chaplain to the Mission to Seamen in Trinidad. He held incumbencies at Rathcormac, Clonmel, Kerricurrihy, Blackrock and Moviddy.

In 1995, he was killed in an auto collision, along with Canon Leslie Clarke and his wife, Phyllis Clarke, while returning from a funeral. Hutchinson's wife, Olive, who had been driving, suffered minor injuries when their car collided with a lorry at the junction to Innishannon Bridge over the River Bandon in County Cork.
