= James St. Ledger =

James St. Ledger (1754–1834) was Archdeacon of Cloyne from 1789 until 1810.

St. Ledger was born in Cork and educated at Trinity College, Dublin He held incumbencies at Gortroe and Castletown. There is a memorial to him at the Church of St Swithin, Bath.
