= John Barker (priest) =

Irish priest

John Kidman Stuart Ridley Barker (1912–1992) was Dean of Cloyne from 1973 until 1984.

He was educated at Durham University and Lichfield Theological College; and ordained in 1936. After curacies at Stockton-on-Tees, Barnard Castle and Castleside he held incumbencies at Cornforth, Warter and Over Whitacre until his appointment as Dean.

Church of Ireland titles
Preceded by Phineas Bury	Dean of Cloyne; 1973–1984	Succeeded by George Percival St John Hilliard
