= Robert Cooper Wills =

Robert Cooper Wills was Archdeacon of Cloyne from 1889 until 1919.

Wills was born at Carrick-on-Shannon on 30 December 1836, educated at Trinity College, Dublin and ordained in 1862. After curacies at Shinrone, Dunkerrin and Lorrha he held incumbencies at Kanturk and Timoleague before his appointment as Archdeacon.

Religious titles
| Preceded by Henry Jellett | Archdeacon of Cloyne; 1889–1936 | Succeeded by Thomas Courtenay Abbott |
