= Dominic Meade =

Dominic Meade (1661–1730) was Archdeacon of Cloyne from 1687 until his death.

Meade was born in Ballintober, County Roscommon; educated at Trinity College, Dublin; and ordained on 19 December 1686.
