= Thomas Royse =

Irish clergyman

Thomas Henry Foorde Russell Buckworth Royse, MC was Archdeacon of Cloyne from 1951 until 1957.

Royse was educated at Trinity College, Dublin and ordained in 1906. After curacies at Kilbrogan and Cork he was a Chaplain to the Forces during World War I. He was the incumbent at Garrycloyne from 1919; and Chancellor of Saint Fin Barre's Cathedral from 1947.

Religious titles
Preceded by Samuel Hobart Taylor Dorman	Archdeacon of Cloyne; 1951–1957	Succeeded by Joseph Alfred Warner
