= James Howie (priest) =

James Howie (1804–1884) was a priest of the Church Of Ireland.

Howie was a student at Trinity College, Dublin, graduating B.A. in 1825 and M.A. in 1832; he was ordained deacon in 1826 and priest in 1827. He became curate at St Mary's Church, Mary Street, Dublin.

He was created prebendary of Howth, in St Patrick's Cathedral, Dublin, in 1847; and was the Dean of Cloyne from 1851 until his death, 6 December 1884.
