= John Fitzedmund =

Irish Anglican cleric

John Fitzedmund was the Dean of Cloyne in Ireland from 1591 to 1612.
