= George Hilliard (priest) =

Irish priest

George Percival St John Hilliard (b 1945) was the Dean of Cloyne from 1985 to 2002.

He was educated at Trinity College, Dublin and ordained in 1970. After a curacy at Carrickfergus he was the incumbent at Fanlobbus until his appointment as Dean.

Church of Ireland titles
Preceded by John Kidman Stuart Ridley Barker	Dean of Cloyne; 1985–2002	Succeeded by Alan George Marley
