= Horace Fleming =

Irish dean

Horace Townsend Fleming was the Dean of Cloyne from 1884 to 1909.

He was educated at Trinity College, Dublin; and ordained in 1850. After curacies in Aughnacloy and Glanmire he held incumbencies in Cork, Kilnagross and Ballymoney until his appointment as Dean.
