= Samuel Dorman =

Archdeacon of Cloyne from 1936 to 1951

Samuel Hobart Taylor Dorman was Archdeacon of Cloyne from 1936 until 1951.

Dorman was educated at Trinity College, Dublin and ordained in 1889. After curacies at Youghal and Knockmourne he was the incumbent at Mogeely from 1892; and Precentor of Cloyne Cathedral from 1936.

Religious titles
Preceded by Thomas Courtenay Abbott	Archdeacon of Cloyne; 1936–1951	Succeeded by Thomas Henry Foorde Russell Buckworth Royse
