= Thomas Abbott (priest) =

Thomas Courtenay Abbott was Archdeacon of Cloyne from 1919 until 1936.

Dorman was educated at Trinity College, Dublin and ordained in 1878. After curacies at Killebban and Cork he held incumbencies at Schull and Fermoy before his appointment as Archdeacon.

Religious titles
Preceded by Robert Cooper Wills	Archdeacon of Cloyne; 1919–1936	Succeeded by Samuel Hobart Taylor Dorman
