= John Moore (archdeacon of Cloyne) =

Archdeacon of Cloyne (1665-1687)

John Moore was Archdeacon of Cloyne from 1665 until 1687.

Moore was born in Queen's County (now called County Laois) and educated at Trinity College, Dublin. He held livings at Killmocahill; Killeagh; Clonmult; Ballyfeard; Inishannon and Templemichael. Moore was a Prebendary of Cork Cathedral from 1667 to 1699.
