= Zachary Cooke-Collis =

Irish Archdeacon of Cloyne

Zachary Cooke-Collis (1754–1834) was Archdeacon of Cloyne from 1810 until his death.

He was born in County Kerry and educated at Trinity College, Dublin, Ireland. Coke-Collis was ordained Deacon on 5 October 1777, and priest on 21 September 1781. After a curacy at Litter, he was the incumbent at Marshalstown.
