= William Fitzgerald (bishop of Clonfert and Kilmacduagh) =

Irish Anglican bishop

William Fitzgerald was an Anglican bishop in Ireland at the end of the 17th-century and the beginning of the 18th.

Fitzgerald had previously been Archdeacon of Ross, Ireland then Dean of Cloyne from 1671 to 1791 when he was nominated for the See of Clonfert and Kilmacduagh on 9 December 1690. He was consecrated on 26 July 1691 and died in 1722.

Church of Ireland titles
Preceded by Henry Rugg	Dean of Cloyne; 1671–1691	Succeeded by Henry Scardeville
Preceded by See vacant	Bishop of Clonfert and Kilmacduagh; 1691–1722	Succeeded by Theophilus Bolton
