= Hugh Berry =

Irish dean

Hugh Frederick Berry was the Dean of Cloyne from 1934 to 1952.

He was educated at Trinity College, Dublin; and ordained in 1898. After a curacy at Fermoy he held incumbencies at Kanturk, Timoleague and Templebreedy until his appointment as Dean.
