= Thomas Wetherhead =

Irish Anglican bishop

Thomas Wetherhead was Archdeacon of Cork and of Cloyne then Bishop of Waterford and Lismore from 1589 until 1592.
