= St Patrick's Catholic Church, York =

Church in York, Western Australia

St Patrick's Church
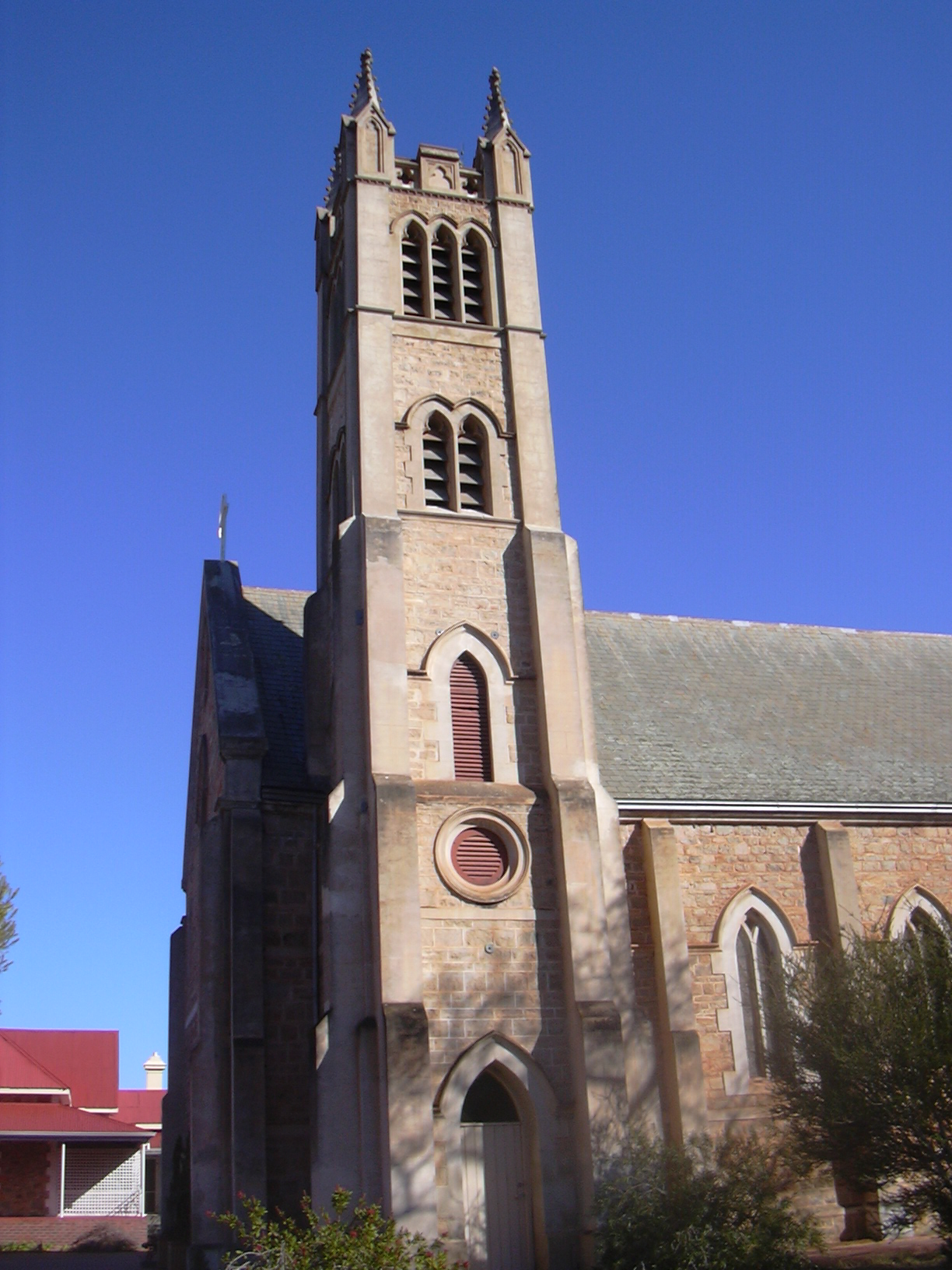
- St Patrick's Catholic Church, York, in 2006
- St Patrick's Church
- 31°53′S 116°46′E
- Address: 38 South St., York, Western Australia
- Denomination: Roman Catholic

Architecture
- Architect: Joseph Nunan
- Style: Victorian Academic Gothic style

Administration
- Archdiocese: Roman Catholic Archdiocese of Perth
- Building details

General information
- Construction started: 1875
- Completed: 1909
- Inaugurated: 1883

Western Australia Heritage Register
- Type: State Registered Place
- Designated: 18 May 2004
- Reference no.: 2878

St Patrick's Church, York is a parish of the Roman Catholic Church in York, Western Australia, within the Archdiocese of Perth. In addition to York, it administers the churches of Sacred Beart in Beverly, Our Lady of the Rosary in Brookton, and St. Ann's in Pingelly.

It is noted in particular for its parish church, constructed from 1875 to 1883, a double volume stone and slate building with a four level tower in the Victorian Academic Gothic style.

== Old St Patrick's ==
In 1858, seven years after the arrival of convicts in York, many of whom were Catholic, the numbers of Catholics in the community had increased and a Spanish monk, Fr Francisco Salvado (with a stress on the "O" and no relation to Bishop Rosendo Salvado) was stationed in York. Immediately, he started raising funds to build a small mission like church. By the end of the year he had raised £25. A foundation stone was laid on Saint Patrick’s Day, 17 March 1859 by Bishop Serra. About 100 people came for the ceremony. In October 1859, the government gave £25 towards the construction cost of the church, being the same amount that was given for Holy Trinity Church.

The building was originally made of fired brick, rendered with a lime and sand mortar and painted a light brown colour at a cost of £180. The builder of the church is not known. The church is a simple neo-Gothic design and could hold 80 people reasonably comfortably. A narrow room at the rear of the building was designed to be used as a sacristy, but also became Fr Salvado’s living quarters. At the time, there were about 200 Catholics in York, mostly convicts. The church was opened on 17 March 1860 and dedicated by Father Martin Griver. The organist from New Norcia made the journey for the opening with a small harmonium to accompany the singing.

In September 1863, Resident Magistrate Walkinshaw Cowan accused Fr Salvado of having an involvement with a young woman who was his housekeeper. Salvado defended himself but was stood down and forced to return to Spain.

For a short period, the parish was served by Father Anselm Bourke but in 1868, he was replaced by Fr Patrick Joseph Gibney.

== St Patrick's ==
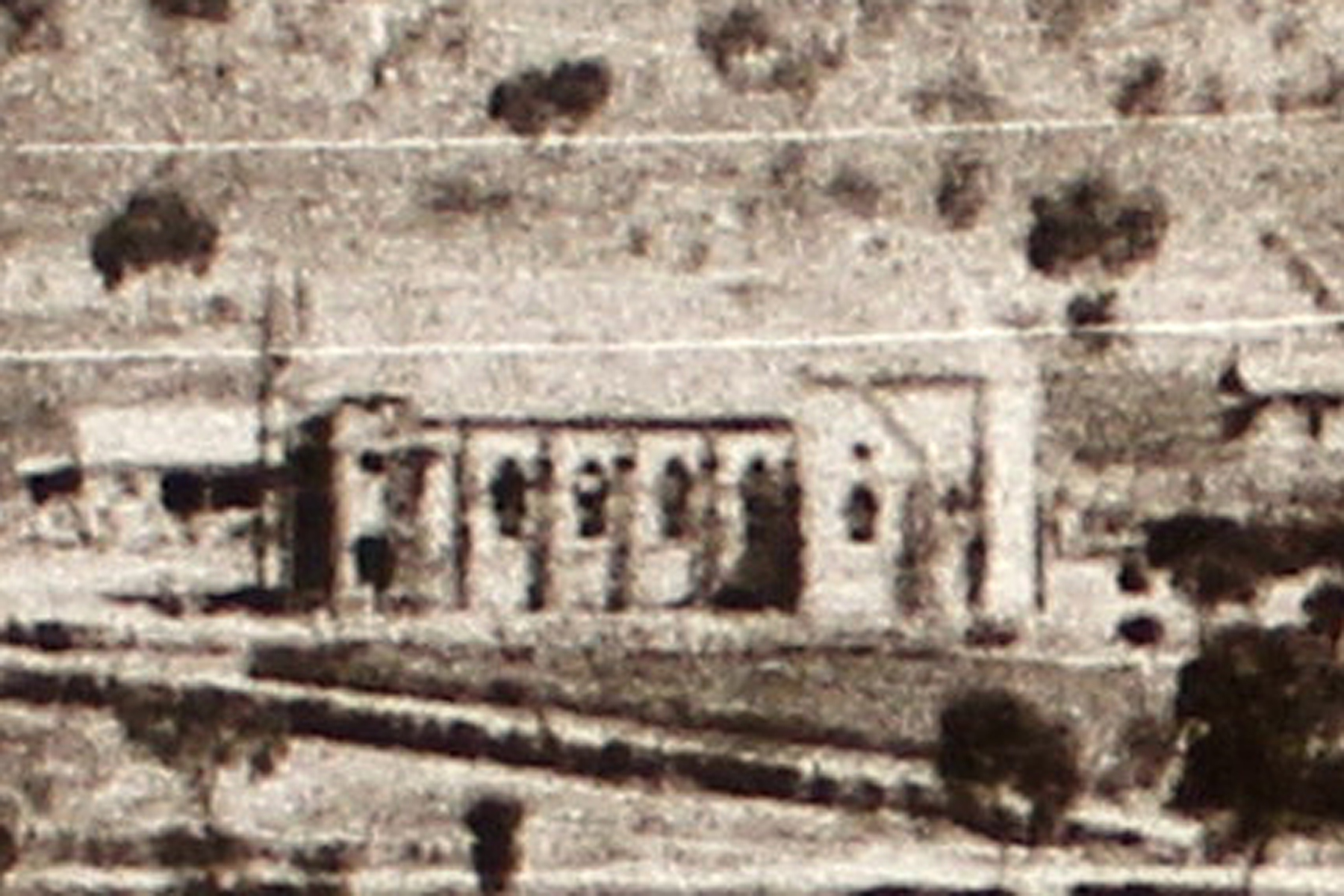
St Patrick's in the course of construction, with presbytery to the right, 1877

Father Gibney served as the Catholic priest from 1868 to the early 1900s. His main achievement was construction of the new church we now know as St Patrick's, which is the larger church to the right of the old St Patrick's.

At the time of its construction, York was the fourth largest town in Western Australia (after Perth, Fremantle and Albany) and so a "substantial and commodious" building was planned. Prior to construction, a large quantity of building material was being collected on the site.

The architect of St Patrick's was Joseph Nunan, who was one of the 61 Fenians to arrive on the last convict ship to Australia on 10 January 1868, the Hougoumont.

28 October 1874 was planned for the laying of the foundation stone, but this was delayed until Saint Patrick's Day, 17 March 1875, so that Bishop Matthew Griver could perform the task.

Henry Davies was contracted as stonemason, with other work undertaken by sub-contractors. Ticket-of-leave men were employed from 1868 to 1875. The carting of timber, lime, stone and bricks was contributed by parishioners and Gibney himself is recorded as carting 39 loads of timber and contributing 322 days of labour on the carting of stone and bricks, as well as undertaking his regular duties. The next highest contributor was E Cahill who carted 9 loads and provided 41 days of labour. Fundraising was by many fairs run by the Sisters of Mercy.

By May 1877, the work of the stonemasons was sufficiently advanced that tenders were called for the roof.

A German immigrant, Thomas Prunster was responsible for many of the timber fittings inside the church: the hammer beams supporting the roof, the high choir and organ gallery above the entrance and the stairway in the tower. The roof was constructed in timber shingles by Thomas Tompkinson with thousands of sheoak shingles.

== Opening and dedication ==
There was an inaugural blessing and opening of the unfinished church on 14 January 1883, by the brother of Father Gibney, Bishop Matthew Gibney. Three years later, on 21 February 1886, the church was dedicated to Saint Patrick, with the ceremony of dedication being performed by Rosendo Salvado. The cost of the church to that time was £7,000 raised from 800 parishioners, with the stained glass from Franz Mayer and Co of Munich and London costing £330.

== Further work ==
During the following decade, work continued on the tower, which was eventually completed in 1909, and at the same time, the roof shingles were replaced with slate.

== Architecture ==
St Patrick's is in Victorian Academic Gothic style. Gothic features include:

- Steeply pitched roof
- Quality stone masonry
- Landmark tower
- Battlements or parapets with crenellations
- Parapeted gable
- Pinnacles
- Porch
- Wall buttresses
- Pointed gothic arches
- Rose window
- Window with tracery
- Quatrefoils, trefoils, and an octofoil window

== Current use ==
St Patrick's continues to function as the venue for Catholic services in York.

== Heritage listings ==
The building is listed on the Shire municipal inventory (31 December 1995), classified by the National Trust of Australia (5 March 1985) and on the Register of the National Estate (21 March 1978), and on the State Register Permanent (18 May 2004).
