= Bartlemy =

Village in County Cork, Ireland

Bartlemy Tobar Pártnáin
- Village
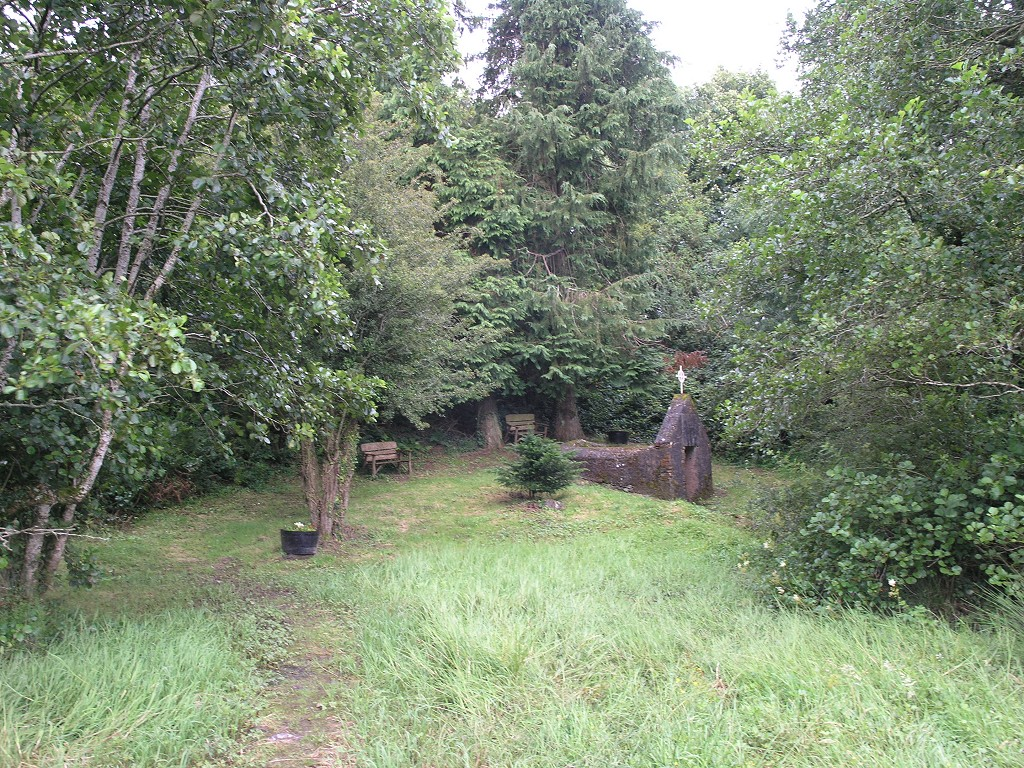
- St. Bartholomews Holy Well, near Bartlemy village

- Location in Ireland
- Coordinates: 52.0489°N 8.2648°W
- Country: Ireland
- Province: Munster
- County: Cork
- Irish Grid Reference: W818885

Bartlemy (Irish: Tobar Pártnáin, meaning 'well of Pártnán') is a small village and townland in County Cork, Ireland. It is located in the civil parish of Gortroe close to the town of Rathcormac. The local Catholic church is dedicated to Saint Bartholomew and was built c. 1820. A "holy well", dedicated to the same saint, is located to the south-west. The village's former post office (built c. 1860) closed in 1991. As of 2024, the local national (primary) school had over 90 pupils enrolled.

== History ==
=== Horse fair ===
An annual horse fair was historically held at Bartlemy cross. Reputedly dating back to the 1600s, two large horse fairs were held on the 4th and 19th of September - or two days at either side of those to allow for Sundays and church holidays. While it is highly unlikely that Napoleon Bonaparte himself ever attended the fair, local tradition suggests that his white horse, Marengo, was bought at the fair by a French Army horse-buyer. One of the last fairs was held in the 1930s.

=== Wool mill ===
Bluebell Woollen Mill was located in the river valley to the northeast at Bluebell between Holyhill and the Ballinterry wood, where bluebells are natively located. It was first a tuck, carding and corn mills, with the remains of its 400 metre mill race still visible.

It was first known as Fielding's Mill who were the earliest known owners and employed much of the village throughout its history while supporting local hand weaving and spinning. Fielding later became associated with Dripsey Woollen Mills, with Bluebell later continued by their descendants through the family of John F Quinlan & Co. of Rathcormac and Glanworth into the 20th century. It made tweed, frieze, serge, flannel and blankets.

== See also ==
- Rathcormac massacre
