= Young baronets of Bailieborough Castle (1821) =

Escutcheon of the Young baronets of Bailieborough Castle

The Young baronetcy, of Bailieborough Castle in the County of Cavan, was created in the Baronetage of the United Kingdom on 28 August 1821 for Lieutenant-Colonel William Young. From Loughgall in the north of County Armagh, he was a Director of the East India Company. The 2nd Baronet served as Governor General of Canada from 1869 to 1872 and was raised to the peerage as Baron Lisgar, of Lisgar and Bailieborough in the County of Cavan, in 1870. The peerage became extinct on Lord Lisgar's death in 1876; while he was succeeded in the baronetcy by his nephew, the 3rd Baronet.

== Young baronets, of Bailieborough Castle (1821) ==
- Sir William Young, 1st Baronet (d. 1848)
- Sir John Young, 2nd Baronet (1807–1876) (created Baron Lisgar in 1870)

== Barons Lisgar (1870) ==
- John Young, 1st Baron Lisgar (1807–1876)

== Young baronets, of Bailieborough Castle (1821; reverted) ==
- Sir William Muston Need Young, 3rd Baronet (1847–1934)
  - Captain John Edgar Harington Young (1871–1902)
  - John Ferrers Harington Young (1897–1916)
- Sir Cyril Roe Muston Young, 4th Baronet (1881–1955)
- Sir John William Roe Young, 5th Baronet (1913–1981)
- Sir John Kenyon Roe Young, 6th Baronet (born 1947)

The heir apparent is the present holder's son Richard Christopher Roe Young (born 1983).

== Notes ==
Baronetage of the United Kingdom
Preceded by Erskine baronets	Young baronets of Bailieborough Castle; 28 August 1821	Succeeded by D'Oyly baronets
