= Alan Marley (priest) =

Irish priest

Alan Gordon Marley (born 1959) was Dean of Cloyne between 2003 and 2017.

He was educated at Dulwich College, the University of Birmingham and Queen's College, Edgbaston. After a curacy at Blandford Forum he was Chaplain at HM YOI Aylesbury from 1993 to 1997. He was the incumbent at Fermoy from 1997 to 2003; and also Domestic Chaplain to the Bishop of Cork, Cloyne and Ross from 1999 to 2003. He has been a Chaplain at University College Cork from 2018

Church of Ireland titles
Preceded by George Percival St John Hilliard	Dean of Cloyne; 2003–	Succeeded by Current incumbent
