= Sir William Young, 1st Baronet, of Bailieborough Castle =

British baronet

Sir William Young, 1st Baronet (1771–1848), was an Irish baronet.

Born on the outskirts of Loughgall in the north of County Armagh, he was the son of the Reverend John Young and Anne McClintock (she was from Trentagh in County Donegal). On 20 September 1806, he married Lucy Frederick (died 8 August 1856), daughter of Sir Charles Frederick and Hon. Lucy Boscawen. They had two daughters and five sons:

1. Anna Young (died 7 June 1882). She married Baron Adolphe Christophe Edouard von Barnekow on 14 June 1860.
2. Augusta Maria Young (died 29 November 1899). She married George Rolleston on 3 April 1841.
3. John Young (born 31 August 1807, died 6 October 1876). He married Adelaide Annabella Dalton on 8 April 1835 and was created 1st Baron Lisgar on 26 October 1870.
4. Thomas Young (born January 1810, died 1846). He married Mary J. Duncan Muston on 24 June 1844.
5. Charles Young (born 3 June 1811, died 18 March 1838).
6. William Young (born June 1817, died September 1850).
7. Helenus Edward Young (born June 1822, died January 1851). He married Frances Skinner on 4 December 1844.

In 1814, William Young bought the Bailieborough Castle estate in County Cavan, Ireland, from Thomas Charles Stewart Corry. Young laid out the town of Bailieborough in its present location and was created the 1st Young Baronet of Bailieborough Castle on 28 August 1821. In the 1830 United Kingdom general election, he was an unsuccessful candidate for the County Cavan constituency.

Sir William died on 10 March 1848, and he was succeeded by his eldest son, John Young, as 2nd Baronet.

Baronetage of the United Kingdom
New creation	Baronet (of Bailieborough Castle); 1821 – 1848	Succeeded by John Young
