= Joseph Nunan =

Architect and Fenian

Joseph Denis Nunan
- Born: February 1842; Rathcormac, County Cork
- Died: 18 May 1885 (aged 43); Perth
- Occupation: Building contractor
- Known for: Architecture

Joseph Denis Nunan (some say Noonan) (February 1842 – 18 May 1885) was an Irish born patriot and builder transported to Fremantle for wounding a policeman. He became an architect and building contractor involved in significant buildings in Perth, Fremantle and York. He never gave up his Fenian beliefs and died before he could return to Ireland.

== Life ==
Nunan was born in Rathcormac, a small town in north County Cork where he learnt the building trade from his father Denis Noonan. Joseph and his brother Frank established a building company that was able to successfully contract for the construction of buildings locally and in County Kerry.

Nunan became a member of the Fenian Brotherhood in 1864. This was an Irish patriot organisation who were trying to establish Ireland as a country that was not under the rule of Great Britain. Nunan was named as a suspect when Constable William Duggan, who was carrying messages, was shot near Glenbeigh in February 1867. Nunan fled to England, but he was identified and arrested in London by an Irish policeman. He escaped on the return railway trip to Dublin by jumping through the window of a train reputedly travelling 64 or 80 kilometres per hour (40 or 50 mph) leaving behind his two escorts. Nunan was again apprehended near Atherstone and taken back to Ireland.

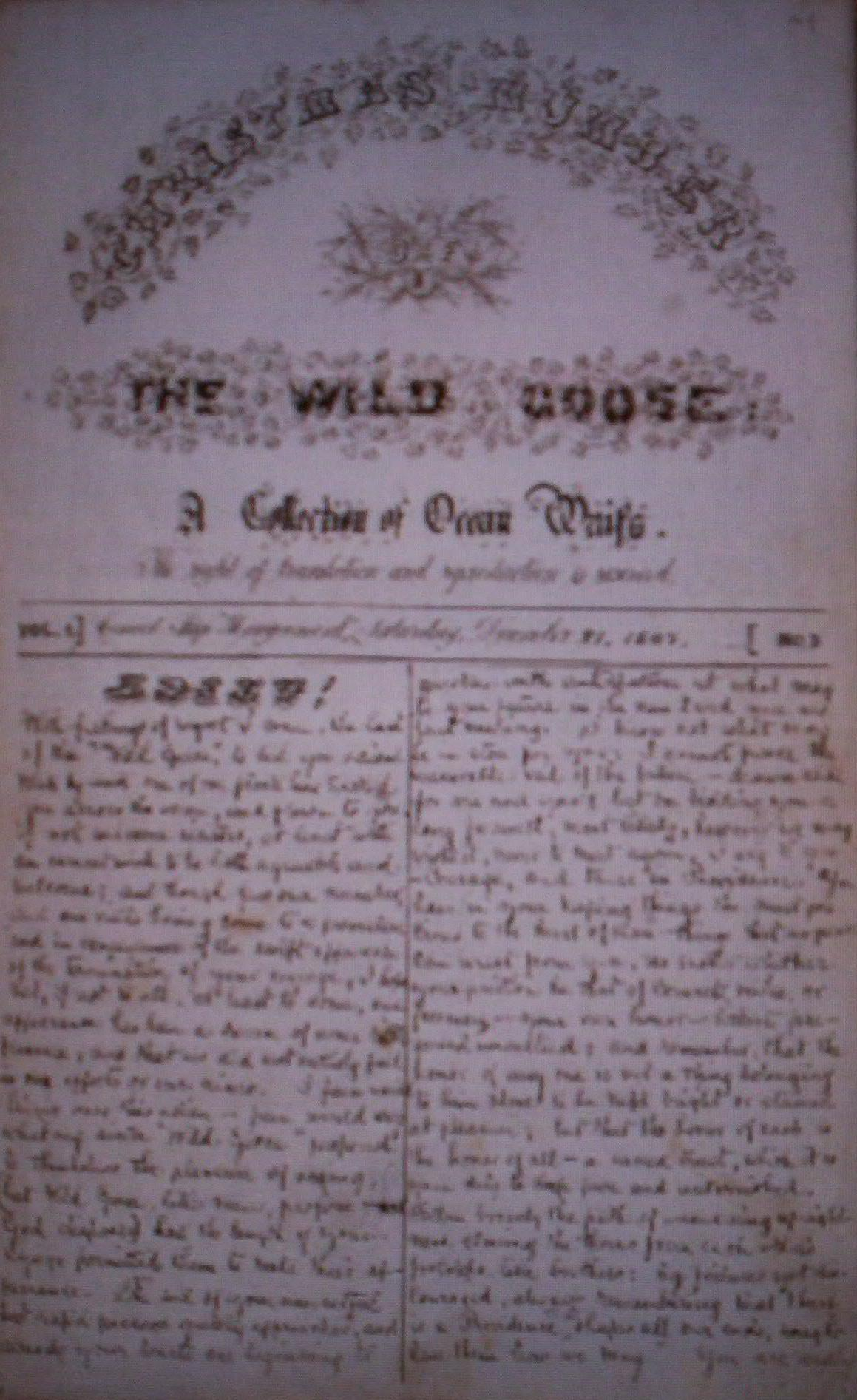
The Wild Goose - Nunan wrote about his escapes for this newspaper.

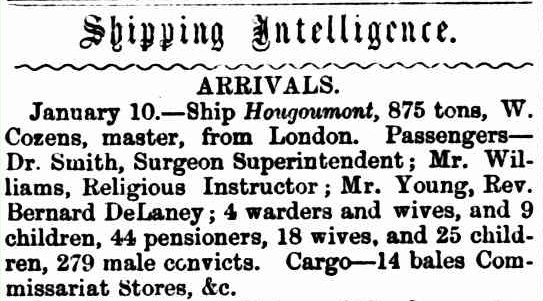
News clipping from the Perth Gazette and West Australian Times, 17 January 1868, announcing the arrival of the Hougoumont in Fremantle

At his trial in Tralee there were pleas of mercy for him, in particular, and Nunan was sent to Australia for seven years on 8 August 1867. During the voyage Nunan wrote humorously for the ship's newspaper (The Wild Goose) about his escape from the train and he also organised social events for his fellow convicts. The newspaper was issued and read aloud weekly on board. There were over 250 convicts aboard the Hougoumont; more than sixty of these were fellow Irish nationalists. Most of these were there as a result of the March 1867 abortive Fenian Rising. Nunan was taken to the convict establishment in Fremantle where he had to remain until 1869. In May the British Government under William Gladstone decided on a more conciliatory approach to Irish politics and Nunan was amongst those who were pardoned. Nunan could have returned to County Kerry but he elected to remain in Western Australia. He undertook to superintend construction of the new convent building in Victoria Square for the Sisters of Mercy, which had been designed by Richard Roach Jewell. Nunan was already known as an expert in design and he had been approached by Father Patrick Gibney who was the new resident priest in York to build a new larger church for his growing congregation.

== Architect ==
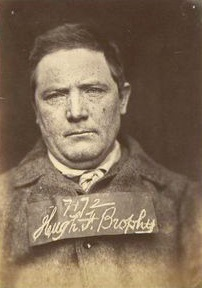
Hugh Francis Brophy photographed in Mountjoy Prison in 1866.

Nunan established another general contracting company with another builder from Dublin who was also a pardoned, Fenian, ex-convict. The two of them were able to employ ex-convicts to contract for many building contracts. They were particularly successful in winning contracts from the Catholic Church.

In 1870 the construction of a police station was completed at Greenough Flats. This was one of Nunan's buildings, but the design has also been credited to Richard Roach Jewell.

On 21 June 1871 Nunan married Anne Marie Farelly at St Mary's Cathedral in Perth. The following year his partner Hugh Brophy moved to Melbourne, but Nunan continued to take on work. Before he died in 1885 of tuberculosis he had built or designed the Greenough Police station, the Edwards building for the Christian Brothers School in 1882–83, St Patrick's Boys School in Perth and what has been called Nunan's best work, St Patrick's Church in York. He also built a store and house for Walter Padbury near his flour mill in Guildford. He is also said to have been involved with the building of Jewell's Perth Town Hall. Nunan died in Perth wanting to leave and return to his native Ireland where his affections still lay.

Nunan continued to be a Fenian as he and Brophy had served as treasurers for funds gathered from Irish sympathisers in Australia. The five hundred pounds was mainly in Nunan's control and was intended to help Fenians after they were pardoned or had finished their sentences in Australia. There was disagreement that accused Nunan of failing to deliver funds promptly and fairly and that this had led to hardship.
