= Theophilus Bolton =

Irish Anglican bishop (1678–1744)

Theophilus Bolton, D.D. (1678–1744) was an Anglican bishop in Ireland in the 17th century. He is known for establishing the Bolton Library.

He was born in County Mayo, and was the grandson of Richard Bolton, Lord Chancellor of Ireland from 1639 to 1648. He was educated at Trinity College Dublin, where he was elected a Scholar in 1695, and was ordained in 1703. He became Prebendary of Monmahenock in 1707; and Rector of St. Nicholas Without, Dublin in 1713. A contemporary of Jonathan Swift, he was appointed Vicar general to the Archbishop of Dublin in 1721 and Precentor of Christ Church Cathedral, Dublin in 1722. Also that year he became Chancellor of St Patrick's Cathedral, Dublin and Bishop of Clonfert and Kilmacduagh. He was translated to Elphin in 1724 and finally to the Archbishopric of Cashel in 1730. He died in post on 31 January 1744.

Church of Ireland titles
Preceded by William Fitzgerald	Bishop of Clonfert and Kilmacduagh; 1722–1724	Succeeded by Arthur Price
Preceded by Henry Downes	Bishop of Elphin; 1724–1730	Succeeded by Robert Howard
Preceded by Timothy Goodwin	Archbishop of Cashel; 1730–1744	Succeeded by Arthur Price
