= John Jephson (priest) =

John Jephson was Archdeacon of Cloyne from 1735 until his death.

The son of William Jephson, Dean of Lismore from 1691 until 1720, he held incumbencies at Dunboyne, Kinsale and Aghabullogue.

He died in 1842 and there is a memorial to him in St Andrew's Church, Dublin. His son was an Irish dramatist and politician.
