= Southwell Rickard =

Irish Anglican cleric

Southwell Rickard (1703–1748) was Archdeacon of Cloyne from 1731 to 1735.

Rickard was born in Dublin and educated at Trinity College, Dublin He was ordained priest on 23 September 1728. After a curacy in Ardagh he was appointed Vicar choral of Cloyne Cathedral and Prebendary of Killinemor in 1730. After his time as Archdeacon he held livings at Dromara and Lurgan.
