= Archdeacon of Cloyne =

Province of Dublin
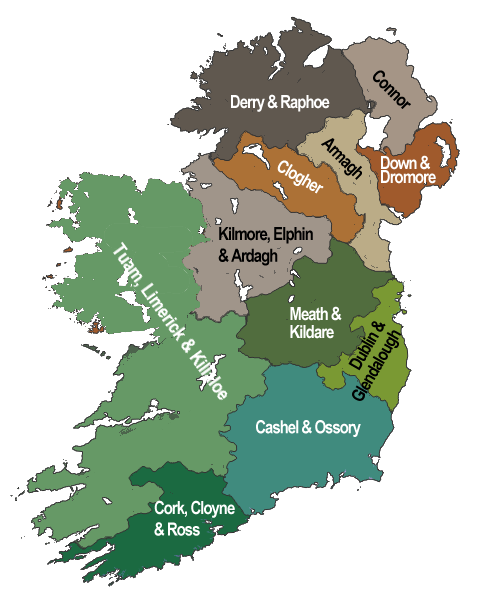
- Church: Church of Ireland
- Metropolitan bishop: Archbishop of Dublin
- Cathedral: Christ Church Cathedral, Dublin
- Dioceses: 5

The Archdeacon of Cloyne was a senior ecclesiastical officer within the Diocese of Cloyne until 1835; and then within the Diocese of Cork, Cloyne and Ross until 1986 when it merged with the Archdeaconry of Cork. As such he was responsible for the disciplinary supervision of the clergy within the Cloyne Diocese.

The archdeaconry can trace its history from Colman O'Scannlain, the first known incumbent, who was mentioned in the Annals of the Four Masters as having been aircinneach (an Irish word for archdeacon) of Cloyne at some time before his death in 1179. to the last discrete holder Arthur Charles Gill. In between Thomas Wetherhead, Michael Boyle and William Steere went on to be bishops.

== Archdeacons ==
=== High Medieval ===
- Colman O'Scannlain
- Christian
- M.
- Matguman O'Donchada
- Maurice O'Sullevan
- Luke O'Murray

=== Late Medieval ===
- Roger Braybrook
- William Roche
- John Barry

=== Early modern ===
- Thomas Wetherhead
- Philip Goulde
- Michael Boyle
- Edward Finch
- William Steere
- Philip Bysse
- Hugh Dunsterville
- John Moore
- Dominic Meade
- Southwell Rickard
- John Jephson
- Michael Davies
- James Mockler
- James St. Ledger

=== Late modern ===
- Zachary Cooke-Collis serving from 1810 until his death in 1834.
- William Ryder, serving from 1834 until his death. in 1862
- Robert Evansfrom 1862 until 1873.
- Henry Jellett, serving from 1853 to 1889
- Robert Cooper Wills, serving from 1889 until 1919
- Thomas Abbott
- Samuel Dorman
- Thomas Royse
- Joseph Warner
- Desmond Hutchinson
- Arthur Gill
