= Dominick Wilson =

Dominick Patrick Sarsfield Wilson was Archdeacon of Ross, Ireland from 1950 until 1972.

He was educated at Trinity College, Dublin and ordained in 1936. After curacies in Belfast and Dundalk he held incumbencies at Durrus, Ballydehob, Kilgariffe and Drimoleague.
