= Arthur Price (bishop) =

Church of Ireland priest

Arthur Price (1678 or 1679 – 1752) was Church of Ireland Archbishop of Cashel from 1744 until his death. Previously he had been Church of Ireland Bishop of Clonfert (1724–1730), Ferns and Leighlin (1730–1734) and Meath (1734–1744).

== Childhood and patronage ==
Arthur was the son of Samuel Price, vicar of Kildrought and Straffan in the diocese of Dublin and, from 1672, prebendary of Kildare. Arthur Price entered Trinity College Dublin, on 2 April 1696, aged seventeen, and was elected a scholar in 1698. He graduated BA in 1700 and DD on 16 April 1724.

After taking holy orders he was successively curate of St. Werburgh's Church, Dublin, and vicar of Celbridge, Feighcullen, and Ballybraine. His father's friendship with William "Speaker" Conolly (1662–1729) placed him in the way of the political patronage vital for advancement in the established church at the time.

Arthur became William Conolly's chaplain and was named prebendary of Donadea on 4 April 1705. Arthur was appointed canon and Archdeacon of Kildare on 19 June 1715. A few months later Conolly was elected as speaker of the Irish House of Commons, confirming his position as chief undertaker now that the Whigs had returned to power in London. This was crucial for Price's future success. In 1719, he became Dean of Lismore; and on 31 March 1721 Ferns. Two years later he received the benefice of Louth in Armagh.

He granted leases of some of the most valuable holdings to Price. In 1724, while Dean of Ferns, Price had a fine stone house erected close by the old house of his father in Oakley Park in the recently renamed Celbridge.

At the time of Conolly's ascendancy, as his speakership coincided with the Lord Lieutenancy of Charles Fitzroy, Duke of Grafton, Price was appointed to the see of Clonfert on 1 May 1724, a promotion that was described as "highly provocative" by the Irish chancellor, Alan Brodrick (1st Viscount Midleton), a former friend of Conolly's, who resented Conolly's emergence as chief manager or 'undertaker' of the government's parliamentary business.

Irish bishoprics were normally given to English-born clerics in the 1700s, and Price's elevation was therefore seen as a patriotic gesture by Conolly. In the 1730s they built the Collegiate School Celbridge, a Charter school that closed in 1972.

== Guinness connection ==
Price bought the Kildrought town malthouse in 1722 and was said to have placed his land steward Richard Guinness in charge of production of "a brew of a very palatable nature". However there is no contemporary evidence for this. After his death in 1752, Price bequeathed £100 each to Richard and his son, the 27-year-old Arthur Guinness; each was described as his "servant". Within a few years Arthur had set up a brewery in 1755 on a new site in Leixlip, and from 1759 he bought another at St James's Gate in Dublin.

== Four times a bishop ==
After Conolly's death in 1729, Price was transferred from Clonfert on 26 May 1730, to the see of Ferns and Leighlin, where he had served as dean. On 2 February 1734, he was transferred to Meath, "on account of his loyalty to George II and his service to the House of Lords."

While bishop of Meath he began to build Ardbraccan House to the design of Richard Cassels but he left the diocese before it was completed, and the house remained unfinished for 40 years, with the Bishops living in one of the wings. Eventually, it was completed in the 1770s by Bishop Henry Maxwell.

== Archbishopric and death ==
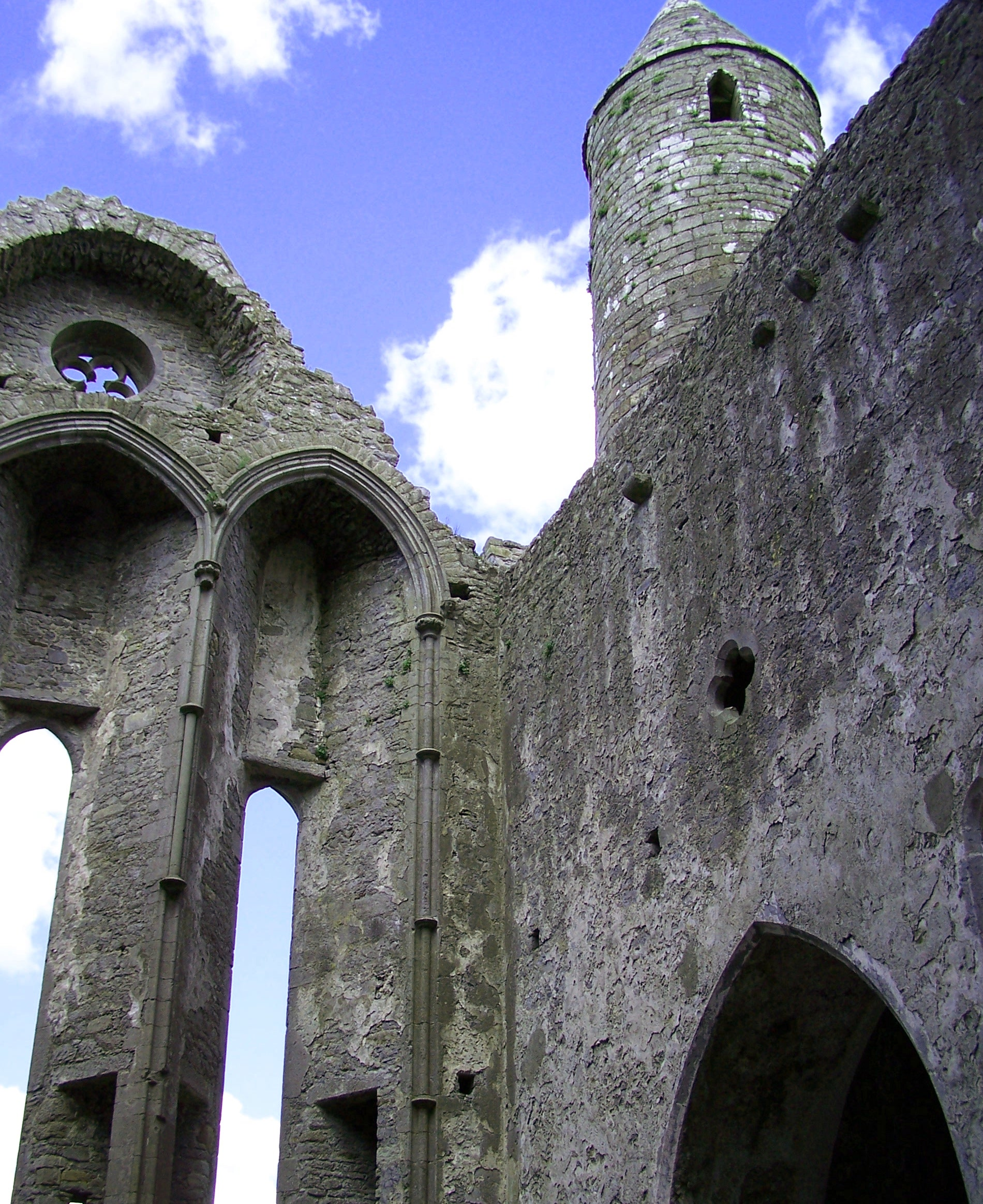
Round Tower from inside the ruins

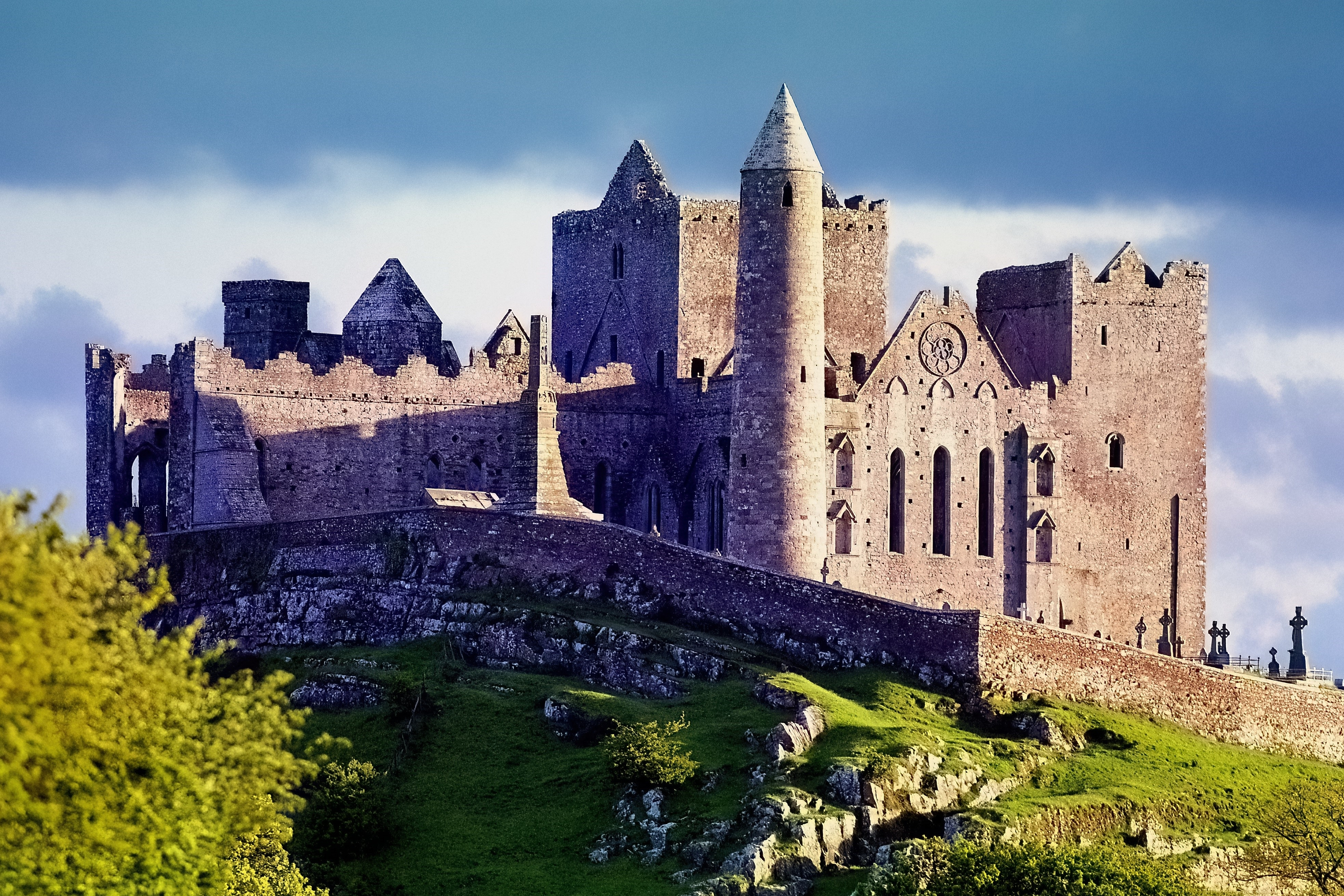
The Rock of Cashel pictured in the Summer of 1986.

In May 1744, Dr Price succeeded Theophilus Bolton as archbishop of Cashel. He over-ruled plans already in train to restore the old cathedral, claiming that it was incapable of being re-roofed despite advice to the contrary. Using political contacts in the Irish Privy Council on 10 July 1749 he got permission to build a new cathedral. In 1783, a new cathedral building was completed on the site of St John's. In the meantime, what remained of the Rock of Cashel after Price had ordered its gutting and de-roofing, has become a primary tourist destination. Price's decision to remove the roof on what had been the jewel among Irish church buildings was criticised before and since.

In 1747, he was made vice-chancellor of Trinity College Dublin.

Price died in 1752 and was buried beneath the aisle of St Mary's church, Leixlip, County Kildare.
