= William Bailie (bishop) =

Anglican bishop (died 1664)

Styles of William Bailie, D.D.
- Reference style: The Right Reverend
- Spoken style: My Lord
- Religious style: Bishop

William Bailie, D.D. (William Bailey, Baily, or Bayly; died 1664) was an Anglican clergyman who served in the Church of Ireland as Bishop of Clonfert and Kilmacduagh from 1644 to 1664.

== Early life and family ==
Born in Scotland, he was named after his father, William Bailie, a native of Ayrshire. He was educated at Glasgow University, but graduated with a Doctorate of Divinity from Oxford University. He and his family were driven out of Scotland by the Covenanters, and fled to Ireland, where his father was granted the lands of Toneregie (now Tandragee) in County Cavan by King James I in 1610. His father had the construction of a fortified house, completed in 1613, and enclosed the demesne by 1629. The estate became known as the Manor of Bailieburrow, which was later known as Bailieborough. On the death of his father in c. 1648, Dr Bailie inherited the estate. Little is known about his wife, but it is certain that they had a daughter Jane, who married James Hamilton of Coroneary and had issue. The Hamilton family remained at Bailieborough for another two generations: they included John Hamilton MP.

== Ecclesiastical career ==
From the Rolls of Chancery, 18–20 Charles I, it appears that Dr Bailie had been designed for the see of Kilmore, upon Bishop Bedell's death; for there is a revocation of several letters patent made to him, dated 3 March 1643-4. Instead, Dr Bailie was nominated Bishop of Clonfert and Kilmacduagh on 22 December 1643 and consecrated at Oxford on 2 May 1644 by James Ussher, Archbishop of Armagh, assisted by John Maxwell, Bishop of Killala and Achonry and Henry Leslie, Bishop of Down and Connor. However, Bishop Bailie had little enjoyment of his see until after the monarchy was restored in Ireland in 1660.

He died at Clonfert, County Galway on 11 August 1664, and was buried in Clonfert Cathedral.

== Notes ==
Church of Ireland titles
Preceded by Robert Dawson	Bishop of Clonfert and Kilmacduagh; 1644–1664	Succeeded by Edward Wolley
