= List of townlands of the barony of Kerrycurrihy =

This is a sortable table of the townlands in the barony of Kerrycurrihy, County Cork, Ireland. Duplicate names occur where there is more than one townland with the same name in the barony, and also where a townland is known by two alternative names. Names marked in bold typeface are towns and villages, and the word Town appears for those entries in the area column.

== Townland list ==
Townland	Area (acres)	Barony	Civil parish	Poor law union
Adamstown	436	Kerrycurrihy	Ballinaboy	Cork
Aghamarta	378	Kerrycurrihy	Templebreedy	Kinsale
Ardmore	285	Kerrycurrihy	Marmullane	Cork
Ardnacloghy	62	Kerrycurrihy	Carrigaline	Cork
Ballea	930	Kerrycurrihy	Liscleary	Kinsale
**Ballinhassig**	Town	Kerrycurrihy	Ballinaboy	Cork
Ballinluska	255	Kerrycurrihy	Templebreedy	Kinsale
Ballinphelic	564	Kerrycurrihy	Liscleary	Kinsale
Ballinrea South	197	Kerrycurrihy	Carrigaline	Cork
Ballinreeshig	419	Kerrycurrihy	Killanully	Cork
Ballintaggart	100	Kerrycurrihy	Carrigaline	Cork
Ballybricken	53	Kerrycurrihy	Barnahely	Cork
Ballyduhig South	233	Kerrycurrihy	Carrigaline	Cork
Ballyfouloo	140	Kerrycurrihy	Monkstown	Cork
Ballygarvan	1,251	Kerrycurrihy	Carrigaline	Cork
Ballyginnane	394	Kerrycurrihy	Liscleary	Kinsale
Ballygrissane	271	Kerrycurrihy	Carrigaline	Kinsale
Ballyhemiken	59	Kerrycurrihy	Liscleary	Cork
Ballymot	109	Kerrycurrihy	Monkstown	Cork
Ballynagrumoolia	424	Kerrycurrihy	Ballinaboy	Cork
Ballynametagh	165	Kerrycurrihy	Carrigaline	Cork
Ballynaneening	209	Kerrycurrihy	Kilpatrick	Kinsale
Ballynoe	204	Kerrycurrihy	Ballinaboy	Cork
Barnahely	451	Kerrycurrihy	Barnahely	Cork
Barrettshill & Rearour	608	Kerrycurrihy	Ballinaboy	Cork
Boycestown	158	Kerrycurrihy	Carrigaline	Kinsale
Brownstown	146	Kerrycurrihy	Kilpatrick	Kinsale
**Carrigaline**	Town	Kerrycurrihy	Carrigaline	Kinsale
**Carrigaline**	Town	Kerrycurrihy	Kilmoney	Kinsale
Carrigaline	84	Kerrycurrihy	Liscleary	Cork
Carrigaline East	332	Kerrycurrihy	Carrigaline	Cork
Carrigaline Middle	406	Kerrycurrihy	Carrigaline	Cork
Carrigaline West	458	Kerrycurrihy	Carrigaline	Cork
**Castlepoint**	Town	Kerrycurrihy	Templebreedy	Kinsale
Commeen	589	Kerrycurrihy	Carrigaline	Kinsale
Coolmore	558	Kerrycurrihy	Carrigaline	Cork
Coolsallagh	273	Kerrycurrihy	Liscleary	Kinsale
Crosshaven	189	Kerrycurrihy	Templebreedy	Kinsale
Crosshavenhill	274	Kerrycurrihy	Templebreedy	Kinsale
Curraghbinny	586	Kerrycurrihy	Carrigaline	Cork
Fahalea	285	Kerrycurrihy	Carrigaline	Kinsale
Fountainstown North	80	Kerrycurrihy	Kilpatrick	Kinsale
Frenchfurze	490	Kerrycurrihy	Carrigaline	Kinsale
Gortnanoon	203	Kerrycurrihy	Templebreedy	Kinsale
Hilltown	140	Kerrycurrihy	Carrigaline	Cork
Hoddersfield	535	Kerrycurrihy	Templebreedy	Kinsale
Inchigeelagh	13	Kerrycurrihy	Templebreedy	Kinsale
Kilcolta	140	Kerrycurrihy	Templebreedy	Kinsale
Killanully	456	Kerrycurrihy	Killanully	Cork
Killeen	37	Kerrycurrihy	Kilpatrick	Kinsale
Kilmichael East	78	Kerrycurrihy	Templebreedy	Kinsale
Kilmichael West	175	Kerrycurrihy	Templebreedy	Kinsale
Kilmoney	1,430	Kerrycurrihy	Kilmoney	Kinsale
Kilnaglery	577	Kerrycurrihy	Carrigaline	Kinsale
Kilnahone	229	Kerrycurrihy	Killanully	Cork
Kingsland	117	Kerrycurrihy	Ballinaboy	Cork
Knockmore	189	Kerrycurrihy	Carrigaline	Cork
Knocknagore	327	Kerrycurrihy	Templebreedy	Kinsale
Lackaroe	64	Kerrycurrihy	Monkstown	Cork
Liskillea	444	Kerrycurrihy	Ballinaboy	Cork
**Loughbeg**	Town	Kerrycurrihy	Barnahely	Cork
Loughbeg	143	Kerrycurrihy	Barnahely	Cork
Maulbaun	143	Kerrycurrihy	Monkstown	Cork
Meadstown	982	Kerrycurrihy	Liscleary	Kinsale
Moanroe	240	Kerrycurrihy	Kilpatrick	Kinsale
**Monkstown**	Town	Kerrycurrihy	Monkstown	Cork
Monkstown (Castle Farm)	256	Kerrycurrihy	Monkstown	Cork
Monkstown	206	Kerrycurrihy	Monkstown	Cork
Myrtleville	79	Kerrycurrihy	Templebreedy	Kinsale
Park	43	Kerrycurrihy	Monkstown	Cork
Parkgarriff	255	Kerrycurrihy	Monkstown	Cork
**Passage West**	Town	Kerrycurrihy	Marmullane	Cork
**Passage West**	Town	Kerrycurrihy	Monkstown	Cork
Pembroke	243	Kerrycurrihy	Marmullane	Cork
Rafeen	550	Kerrycurrihy	Liscleary	Cork
Raheenering	127	Kerrycurrihy	Carrigaline	Cork
Raheens	175	Kerrycurrihy	Carrigaline	Cork
Raheens East	34	Kerrycurrihy	Carrigaline	Cork
Rathanker	320	Kerrycurrihy	Monkstown	Cork
Rearour and Barrettshill	608	Kerrycurrihy	Ballinaboy	Cork
Ringaskiddy	246	Kerrycurrihy	Barnahely	Cork
Shanagraigue	465	Kerrycurrihy	Liscleary	Kinsale
Shanbally	353	Kerrycurrihy	Carrigaline	Cork
Shannonpark	201	Kerrycurrihy	Carrigaline	Cork
Tullig Beg	150	Kerrycurrihy	Ballinaboy	Cork
Tullig More	447	Kerrycurrihy	Ballinaboy	Cork
