= Curraghbinny =

Townland in County Cork, Ireland

Curraghbinny Corra Binne
- Townland
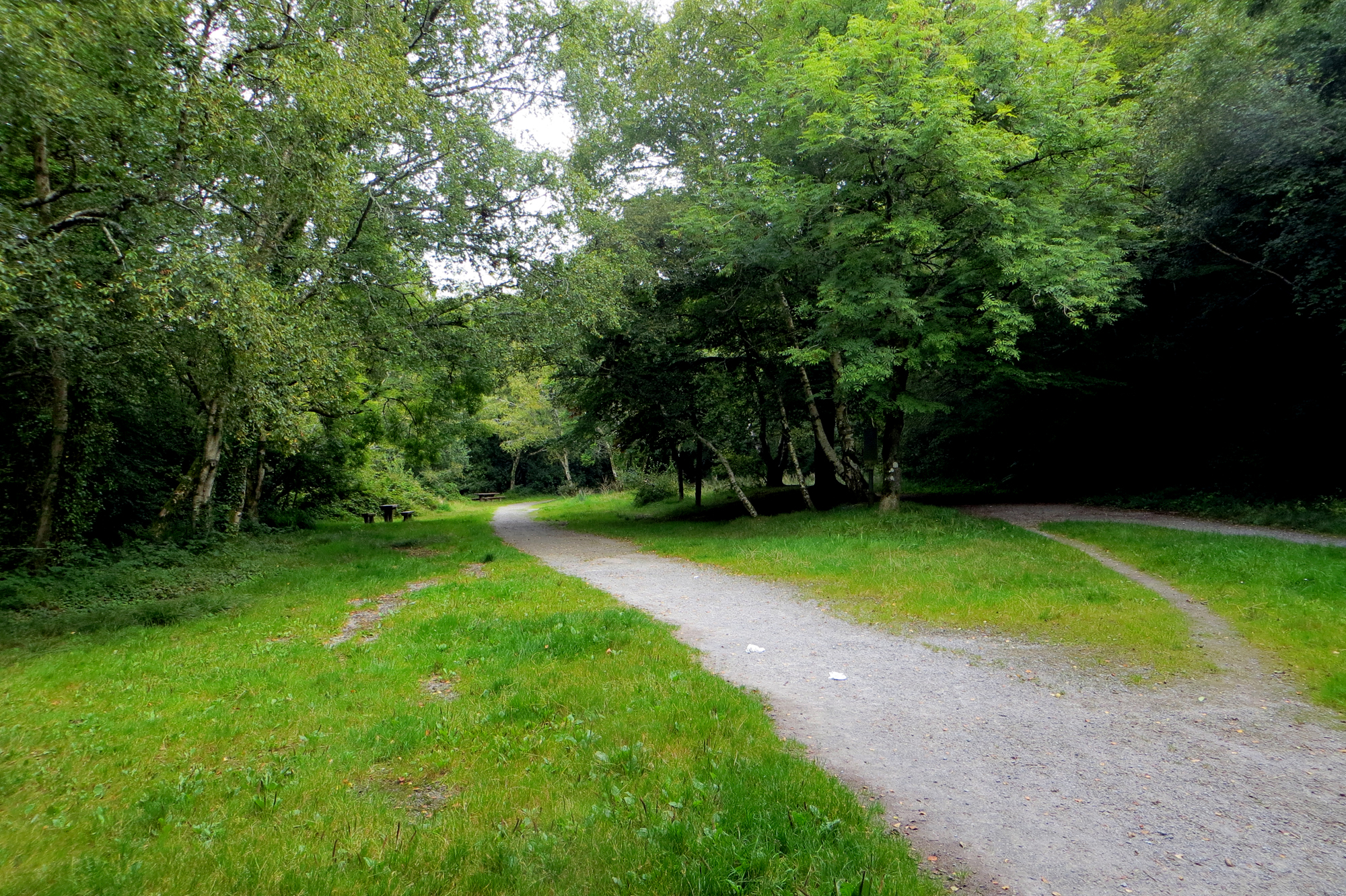
- Curraghbinny Wood

- Location within Ireland
- Coordinates: 51.811°N 8.305°W
- Country: Ireland
- County: County Cork
- Civil parish: Carrigaline

Population (2011)
  - Total: 155
- Time zone: UTC+0 (WET)
  - Summer (DST): UTC-1 (IST (WEST))
- Irish grid reference: W792620

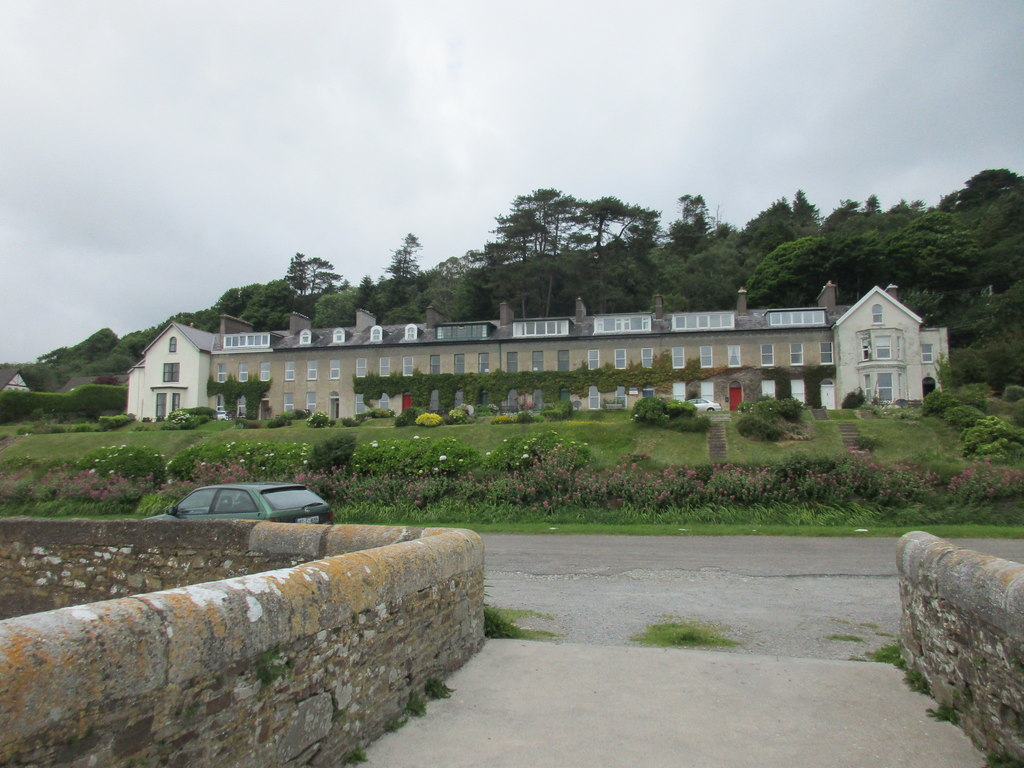
The Terrace, Curraghbinny

Curraghbinny (Irish: Corra Binne), also sometimes spelled Currabinny or Currabinney, is a townland in County Cork, Ireland. Located on Cork Harbour near Ringaskiddy and with an area of 2.4 square kilometres (240 ha), it is a townland in the barony of Kerrycurrihy. As of the 2011 census, Curraghbinny townland had a population of 155 people. Lough Beg Bird Reserve and Curraghbinny Wood are located in the area. There is also a large pharmaceutical manufacturing plant, which was acquired by Thermo Fisher Scientific from GlaxoSmithKline for €90m in 2019, in the townland.

== History ==
Evidence of ancient settlement in Currabinny townland include a number of burnt spread and shell midden sites.

At the highest point on Curraghbinny Hill are the remains of a Bronze Age cairn which is known locally as the "giant's grave". The cairn, which was subject to excavation in the 1930s (during which cremated human remains and a bronze ring was found), was restored in the 1990s. There is some speculation that the name Curraghbinny derives from a legend of a giant named Binne whose burial chamber surmounts the hill (corra).

A thatched cottage within the townland, dating to the mid-18th century, is described by the National Inventory of Architectural Heritage as "an incredibly rare survivor" of its type in the area.

== Woodland ==
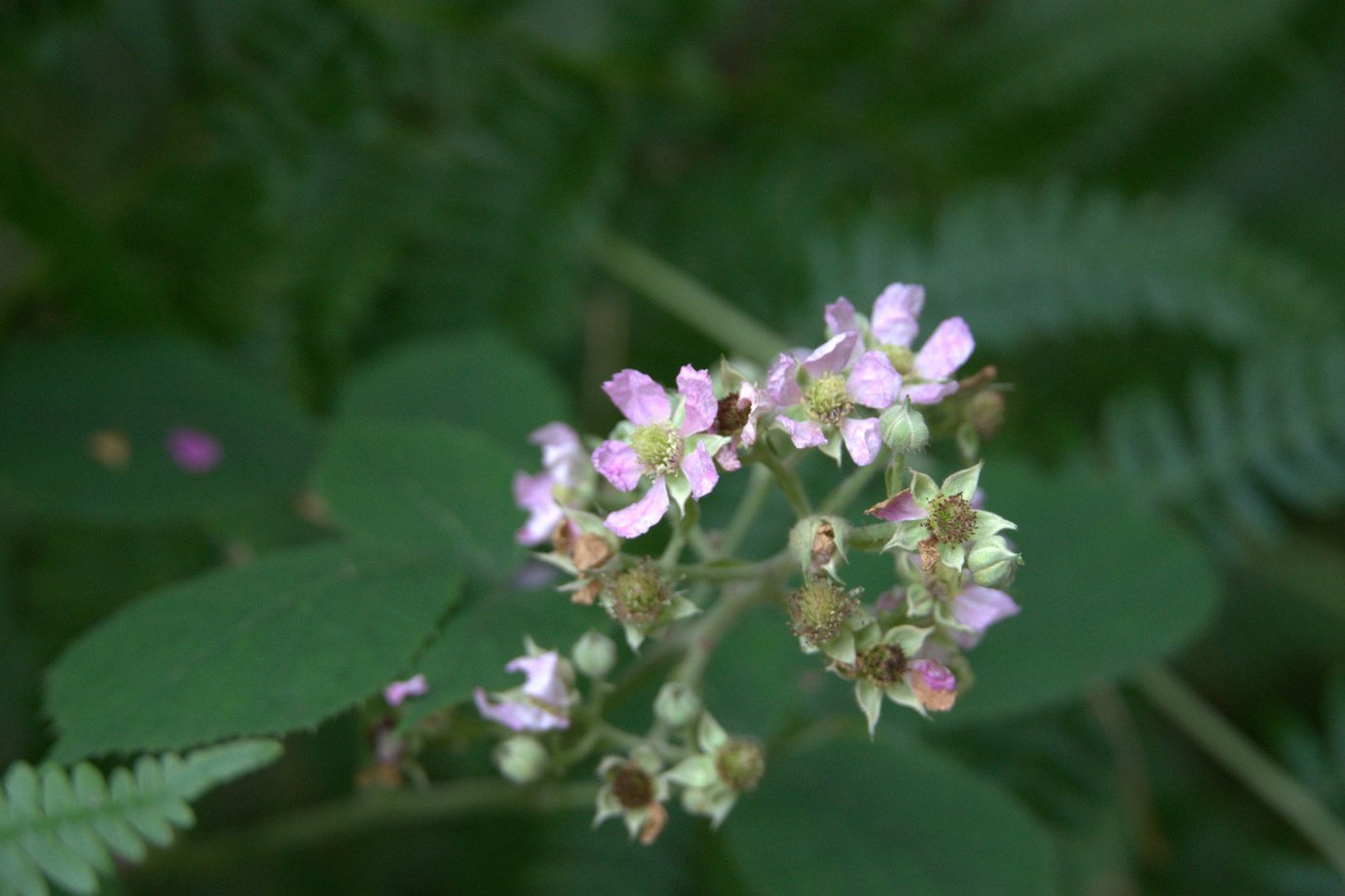
Rubus fruticosus as seen beneath the trees at Curraghbinny

Curraghbinny Wood is a forested amenity, of approximately 35 hectares (86 acres), which is maintained by Coillte. The woodlands are home to a number of species of plants, trees, shrubs and wildflowers. A number of these were planted c. 1890, with some identified as garden escapees. Downy birch (Betula pubescens), pedunculate oak (Quercus robur), sycamore (Acer pseudoplatanus), and European beech (Fagus sylvatica) are present in the canopy. The shrubs and hedges include a mixture of native and introduced plants. Bramble (Rubus fruticosus), woodrush (Luzula sylvatica), broad buckler-fern (Dryopteris dilatata) are the native ground cover, with cherry laurel (Prunus laurocerasus) and common rhododendron (Rhododendron ponticum) introduced via the gardens adjoining the woods.

The area is also home to several species of birds, including goldcrest (Regulus regulus), Eurasian wren (Troglodytes troglodytes), Common wood pigeon (Columba palumbus), Eurasian siskin (Spinus spinus), Eurasian blackbird (Turdus merula), Great cormorant (Phalacrocorax carbo), Eurasian blue tit (Cyanistes caeruleus), European robin (Erithacus rubecula), and European herring gull (Larus argentatus).

There is a plaque to the Irish-Canadian politician, William Warren Baldwin, within the wood.

== See also ==
- Crosshaven
- River Owenabue
