= Gortroe =

Civil Parish in County Cork, Ireland

Coordinates: 52.664°N 8.469°W

Gortroe Irish: An Gort Rua
- Civil Parish
- Interactive map of Gortroe
- Country: Ireland
- County: County Cork
- Barony: Barrymore

Gortroe (Irish: An Gort Rua) is a civil parish in the historical barony of Barrymore in County Cork, Ireland. In 1834, during the Tithe War, the Gortroe massacre took place in the area. The village of Bartlemy is within Gortroe civil parish.
