= Bishop of Clonfert and Kilmacduagh =

Ordinary of the Church of Ireland

The Bishop of Clonfert and Kilmacduagh was the Ordinary of the Church of Ireland diocese of Clonfert and Kilmacduagh, comprising the southern part of County Galway and a small area of County Roscommon, Ireland. In 1834, Clonfert and Kilmacduagh became part of the united bishopric of Killaloe and Clonfert.

== History ==
Roland Lynch, Bishop of Kilmacduagh, held the see of Clonfert "in commendam" from 1602 until his death in 1625; thereafter the sees of Clonfert and Kilmacduagh were united. Under the Church Temporalities (Ireland) Act 1833 (3 & 4 Will. 4. c. 37), the see of Clonfert and Kilmacduagh was united with Killaloe and Kilfenora to form the united bishopric of Killaloe and Clonfert in 1834.

== List of bishops ==
Bishops of Clonfert and Kilmacduagh
From	Until	Incumbent	Notes
1627	1643	Robert Dawson	Nominated 29 August 1626; consecrated 4 May 1627; died 13 April 1643
1644	1664	William Bailie	Nominated 22 December 1643; consecrated 2 May 1644; died 11 August 1664
1664	1684	Edward Wolley	Nominated 5 November 1664; consecrated 16 April 1665; died 1684; also known as Edward Woolly
1684	1690	See vacant	During part of this period, the see's revenues were transferred to the Catholic Bishop of Clonfert by King James II
1691	1722	William Fitzgerald	Nominated 9 December 1690; consecrated 26 July 1691; died 1722
1722	1724	Theophilus Bolton	Nominated 17 August 1722; consecrated 30 September 1722; translated to Elphin 16 April 1724
1724	1730	Arthur Price	Nominated 19 March 1724; consecrated 3 May 1724; translated to Ferns 26 May 1730
1730	1731	Edward Synge	Nominated 14 May 1730; consecrated 7 June 1730; translated to Cloyne 22 March 1732
1732	1735	Mordecai Cary	Nominated 18 February 1732; consecrated 26 March 1732; translated to Killala 20 December 1735; also known as Mordecai Carey
1735	1752	John Whitcombe	Nominated 22 November 1735; consecrated 4 January 1736; also held Kilfenora "in commendam" 1742–1752; translated to Down, Connor and Dromore 21 March 1752
1752	1753	Arthur Smyth	Nominated 24 February 1752; consecrated 5 April 1752; translated to Down, Connor and Dromore 24 January 1753
1753	1758	Hon. William Carmichael	Nominated 28 December 1752; consecrated 1 April 1753; translated to Ferns 5 April 1758
1758	1762	William Gore	Nominated 17 March 1758; consecrated 16 April 1758; translated to Elphin 3 March 1762
1762	1763	John Oswald	Nominated 1 April 1762; consecrated 4 July 1762; translated to Dromore 7 May 1763
1763	1772	Denison Cumberland	Nominated 19 April 1763; consecrated 19 June 1763; translated to Kilmore 6 March 1772
1772	1782	Walter Cope	Nominated 27 January 1772; consecrated 15 March 1772; translated to Ferns 9 August 1782
1782	1787	John Law	Nominated 26 July 1782; consecrated 21 September 1782; translated to Killala 10 November 1787
1787	1795	Richard Marlay	Nominated 10 September 1787; consecrated 30 December 1787; translated to Waterford and Lismore 21 March 1795
1795	1796	Hon. Charles Brodrick	Nominated 11 March 1795; consecrated 22 March 1795; translated to Kilmore
1796	1799	Hugh Hamilton	Nominated 31 December 1795; consecrated 31 January 1796; translated to Ossory 24 January 1799
1799	1800	Matthew Young	Nominated 15 January 1799; consecrated 3 February 1799; died 28 November 1800
1801	1802	George de la Poer Beresford	Nominated 23 December 1800; consecrated 1 February 1801; translated to Kilmore 1 March 1802
1802	1804	Nathaniel Alexander	Nominated 13 January 1802; consecrated 21 March 1802; translated to Killaloe
1804	1834	Christopher Butson	Nominated 13 January 1802; consecrated 29 July 1804; became bishop of the united see of Killaloe and Clonfert 29 January 1834

== See also ==
- Clonfert Cathedral
- Kilmacduagh monastery
