= Phineas Bury =

Dean of Cloyne

Phineas Bury (8 October 1902 – 5 November 1973) was an Anglican priest who was Dean of Cloyne from 1957 until his death in 1973.

Born in London to an Anglo-Irish family, Bury was educated at Christ's College, Cambridge and St Augustine's College, Canterbury. He was ordained in 1931. After a curacy at Far Headingley he was the Chaplain at Buenos Aires then Kamptee. He was Rector of Castletownroche then Ballycotton until his appointment as Dean.
