= Rathcormac massacre =

1834 civilian mass casualty incident

Rathcormac-Gortroe Massacre
- Part of the Tithe War
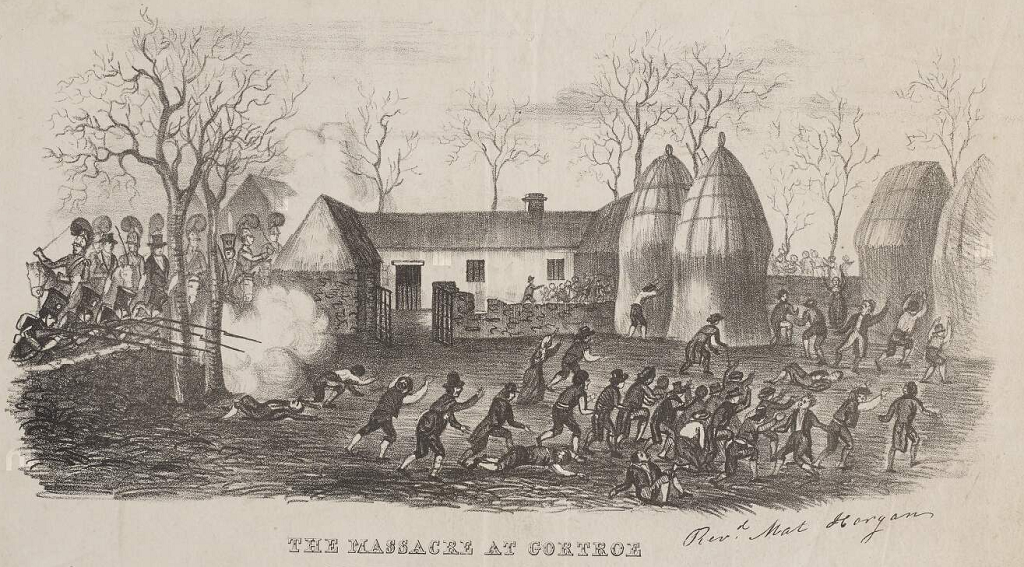
- "The Massacre at Gortroe", a lithograph published in August 1848
- Date: 18 December 1834
- Location: Near Bartlemy, County Cork; 52.0488°N 8.2617°W

Parties
British Army; Royal Irish Constabulary	Irish tenant farmers

Number
~100	~250

Casualties and losses
0 killed, several injuries	~12-20 killed (~45 injured)

Casualties
- Deaths: ~12-20

The Rathcormac massacre, also known as the Gortroe massacre, was an incident during the Tithe War in Ireland which took place on 18 December 1834 near the village of Bartlemy, County Cork close to the town of Rathcormac. Approximately 250 Irish tenant farmers confronted a group of roughly 100 British Army soldiers and Royal Irish Constabulary policemen who were escorting a distraining party attempting to collect tithes owed to a Church of Ireland rector. The farmers attacked the soldiers and policemen who responded after forty-five minutes by opening fire on the farmers, killing between 12 and 20 people and wounding roughly 45.

== Background ==
Beginning in 1830, Irish Catholic tenant farmers began to withhold the tithes they had been ordered to pay towards the vicar of the Anglican Church of Ireland's local parish. This was done as part of the Tithe War, a campaign of civil disobedience in the Irish countryside. The tithes which were due on 1 November 1834 to Archdeacon William Ryder, a resident magistrate and rector of the parish of Gortroe in County Cork went undelivered; in response, Ryder along with fellow district magistrate Richard Boyle Bagley and a justice of the peace named William Cooke Collis led a distrainting party to collect the tithes owed to him.

== Massacre ==
On 18 December 1834, the distraining party was joined by an escort of approximately 100 men at the village of Bartlemy. The escort consisted of 12 cavalrymen from the 4th Royal Irish Dragoon Guards commanded by a Major Waller, two companies of the 29th Regiment of Foot under the command of a Lieutenant Tait and "a very small party" of the Royal Irish Constabulary led by a Captain Pepper. Once the party and its escort had left Bartlemy, it soon encountered a crowd of roughly 250 local tenant farmers who began pelting them with stones before retreating to a plot of land inhabited by a widow named Johanna Ryan where a defensive barricade had been previously constructed.

Since Ryan owed a tithe of forty shillings in arrears to Ryder, the party and its escort moved towards her plot of land to forcibly collect either the money owed or goods of equal value. After reading out the Riot Act and ordering the crowd to disperse, the escort advanced towards the plot of land but the tenant farmers attacked them with "spades, sticks and stones" and forced them back. This went on for forty-five minutes, and several members of the escort party began to sustain injuries. Eventually, Waller ordered the escort to open fire on the crowd, which killed at least nine members of the crowd outright and wounded forty-eight people, of whom at least three subsequently died of their wounds. Nobody from the distraining party or their escort was killed in the incident, though many were injured. The crowd subsequently dispersed and Ryan paid her tithe.

== Aftermath ==
After hearing of the incident, Irish statesman Daniel O'Connell wrote a legal opinion arguing that the actions of the escort amounted to murder. An inquest was subsequently held for the nine people who died at the scene, which saw Repeal Association politician Feargus O'Connor attend to argue in favour of O'Connell's points. Of the jurors who sat on the inquests' jury, thirteen voted for murder, two for manslaughter and eight for justifiable homicide. Ryder, Bagley and Collis were arrested and released on bail, though criminal charges against the trio were later dropped. In a session of the British Parliament, O'Connor claimed that in addition to the nine who died on the scene, two other corpses were carried away and a further nine died of their wounds. Fellow Repeal Association politician Henry Grattan published a letter written by Lord FitzRoy Somerset in which he expressed satisfaction with the conduct of the escort.

The incident led the Dublin Castle administration to permanently end the automatic assignment of military and police escorts to distraining parties, instead implementing a policy of requiring written proof that a party was genuinely endangered before they would be given an escort. It has been referred to as "the last battle of the Tithe War", though there were subsequently less severe riots which occurred prior to the British Parliament's Tithe Act 1836 which resolved the controversy. In 1984, a monument was erected in Gortroe to commemorate the 150th anniversary of the incident. The monument describes the event as the "final battle of the Tithe War" and lists the names of 12 people who died.

== See also ==
- Carrickshock incident
