= Holy Trinity Church, Templebreedy =

Holy Trinity Church
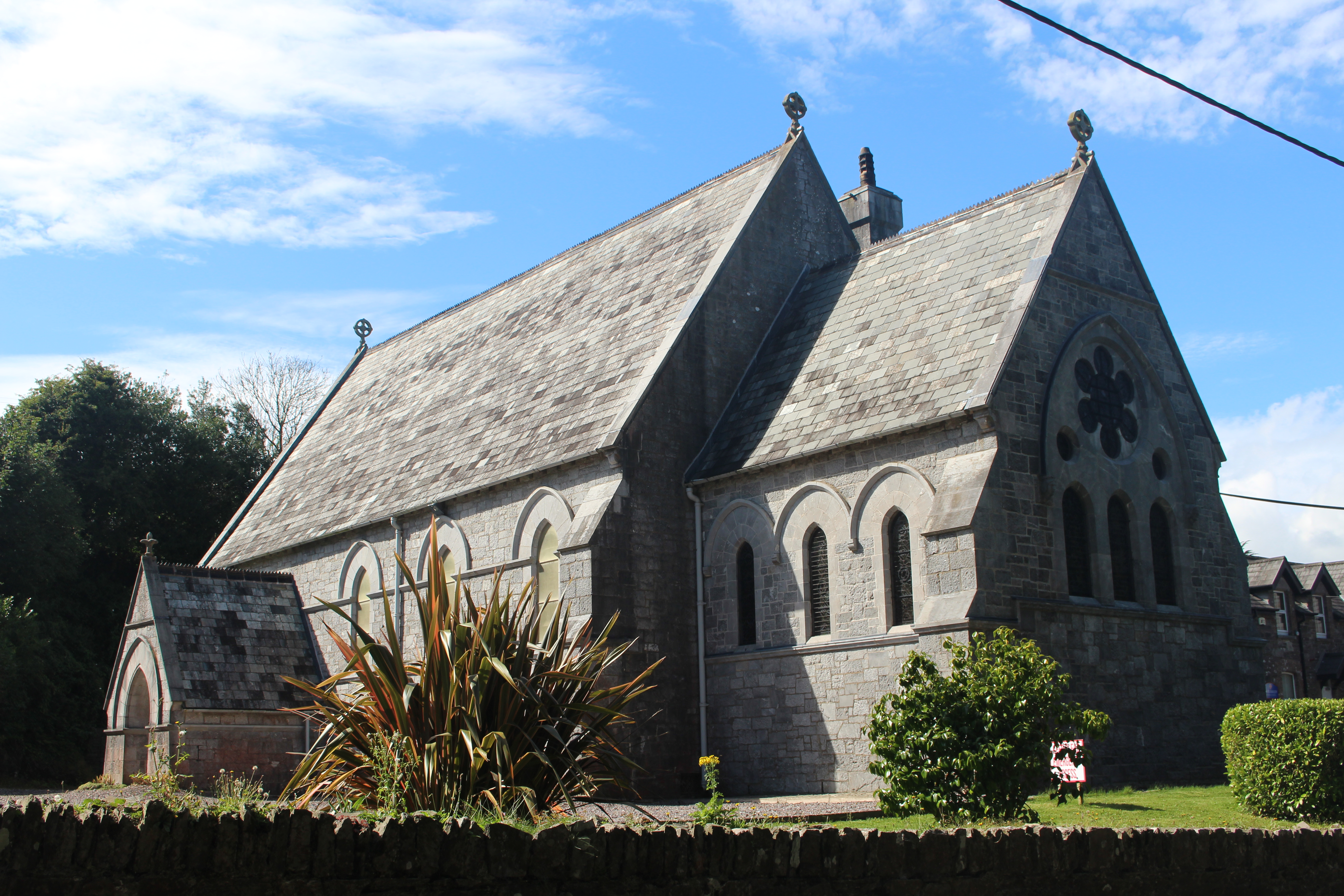
- Holy Trinity Church
- 51.7998°N 8.2973°W
- Location: Templebreedy, Cork
- Country: Ireland
- Denomination: Church of Ireland
- Website: www.templebreedy.cork.anglican.org

History
- Consecrated: 1868

Architecture
- Architect: William Burges
- Style: Gothic
- Years built: 1866-68

Clergy
- Rector: Revd James Power

Holy Trinity Church, Templebreedy is a parish church of the Church of Ireland close to Crosshaven, in County Cork, Ireland. It was designed by William Burges, who also designed Saint Fin Barre's Cathedral. The building opened in 1868 and remains an active parish church.

== History ==
The foundation stone of Holy Trinity Church was laid on 31 October 1866 by the Right Rev'd John Gregg, D.D., then Bishop of Cork, Cloyne and Ross. The town had been growing in popularity as a holiday resort and its original church (St Matthew's Church, built in 1778) was deemed insufficient for the increasing population. William Burges was appointed architect for a new church with a budget of £1,700, of which £500 was subscribed by parishioners and £1,200 given by the Ecclesiastical Commissioners.

The site for the new church was given by Mr. Thomas Hayes of Crosshaven House, "who gave a carte blanche to the chairman the Rev'd M. Archall, to go over all his property and select whatever site he chose for the building, and the church would be erected on one of the best fields on his estate". The church was consecrated on Trinity Sunday in 1868, being dedicated to the Holy Trinity.

Holy Trinity remains an active parish church.

== Architecture and description ==
The original design for the church included a substantial tower, its inspiration drawn from the medieval campanile of northern Italy, as illustrated in the Irish Builder and Engineer of 15 April 1873. The article's author wrote of the completion of the tower as fulfilling "one of the happiest of architectural compositions it has been our pleasure to describe for a very long time." However, the tower was never built and the church comprises a more modest set of structures. It is nevertheless identified by architectural historians as recognisably Burges's work. Burges's biographer, Joseph Mordaunt Crook, noted, "the smooth plate tracery, the low-slung battered porch, the emphatic string courses: these are all Burgesian trademarks." Crook also notes the interior as "measur(ing) up to the quality of the exterior - notably the pelican-dragon corbels of the chancel arch and the stained glass at the East end." The glass was made to Burges's designs by Lavers and Barraud.

== Sources ==
- Crook, J. Mordaunt (1981). William Burges and the High Victorian Dream. London: John Murray. ISBN 978-0-7195-3822-3.
- Keohane, Frank (2020). Cork: City and County. Pevsner Buildings of Ireland. New Haven, US and London: Yale University Press. ISBN 978-0-300-22487-0. OCLC 1112895036.
