= List of townlands of the barony of Imokilly =

This is a sortable table of the townlands in the barony of Imokilly, County Cork, Ireland. Duplicate names occur where there is more than one townland with the same name in the barony, and also where a townland is known by two alternative names. Names marked in bold typeface are towns and villages, and the word Town appears for those entries in the area column.

== Townland list ==
Townland	Area (acres)	Barony	Civil parish	Poor law union
**Aghada (Lower)**	Town	Imokilly	Aghada	Midleton
**Aghada (Upper)**	Town	Imokilly	Aghada	Midleton
Aghada	488	Imokilly	Aghada	Midleton
Aghadoe	348	Imokilly	Killeagh	Youghal
Aghavine	586	Imokilly	Kilmacdonogh	Youghal
Annistown	123	Imokilly	Mogeely	Midleton
Ardnabourkey	341	Imokilly	Corkbeg	Midleton
Ardnahinch	149	Imokilly	Kilmahon	Midleton
Ardra Beg	184	Imokilly	Rostellan	Midleton
Ardra More	278	Imokilly	Rostellan	Midleton
Attiquin	75	Imokilly	Ballyoughtera	Midleton
Aughane	78	Imokilly	Rostellan	Midleton
Bakersclose	24	Imokilly	Killeagh	Youghal
Ballinacarroonig	244	Imokilly	Aghada	Midleton
Ballinbeg	96	Imokilly	Aghada	Midleton
Ballincourlea	144	Imokilly	Ightermurragh	Midleton
Ballincurrig	200	Imokilly	Titeskin	Midleton
Ballindinis	110	Imokilly	Mogeely	Midleton
Ballindinis	2	Imokilly	Killeagh	Midleton
Ballindinis	37	Imokilly	Ightermurragh	Midleton
Ballingarrane	169	Imokilly	Kilmahon	Midleton
Ballingarrane	219	Imokilly	Cloyne	Midleton
**Ballinrostig**	Town	Imokilly	Rostellan	Midleton
Ballinrostig	282	Imokilly	Rostellan	Midleton
Ballinteosig	815	Imokilly	Ardagh	Youghal
Ballintotis	438	Imokilly	Ballyoughtera	Midleton
Ballintra East	59	Imokilly	Corkbeg	Midleton
Ballintra West	70	Imokilly	Corkbeg	Midleton
Ballintrim	210	Imokilly	Titeskin	Midleton
Ballinvarrig Lower	188	Imokilly	Clonpriest	Youghal
Ballinvarrig Upper	304	Imokilly	Clonpriest	Youghal
Ballinvoher	23	Imokilly	Ballintemple	Midleton
Ballinvoher	247	Imokilly	Cloyne	Midleton
Ballinwillin	140	Imokilly	Cloyne	Midleton
**Ballyandreen**	Town	Imokilly	Kilmahon	Midleton
Ballyandreen	74	Imokilly	Ballintemple	Midleton
Ballybane	491	Imokilly	Cloyne	Midleton
Ballybraher	194	Imokilly	Cloyne	Midleton
Ballybraher	374	Imokilly	Kilmahon	Midleton
Ballybraher	84	Imokilly	Ballyoughtera	Midleton
Ballybranagan	317	Imokilly	Titeskin	Midleton
Ballybranagh	218	Imokilly	Cloyne	Midleton
Ballybutler	327	Imokilly	Garryvoe	Midleton
Ballycarnane	162	Imokilly	Killeagh	Youghal
Ballycatoo	266	Imokilly	Ballintemple	Midleton
Ballyclamasy	39	Imokilly	Youghal	Youghal
Ballycolman	467	Imokilly	Ardagh	Youghal
**Ballycottin**	Town	Imokilly	Cloyne	Midleton
Ballycottin	466	Imokilly	Cloyne	Midleton
Ballycottin Island (small)	4	Imokilly	Cloyne	Midleton
Ballycottin Island	9	Imokilly	Cloyne	Midleton
Ballycrenane	297	Imokilly	Cloyne	Midleton
Ballycrenane	511	Imokilly	Kilcredan	Midleton
Ballycrenane Beg	102	Imokilly	Mogeely	Midleton
Ballycroneen East	7	Imokilly	Cloyne	Midleton
Ballycroneen West	401	Imokilly	Cloyne	Midleton
Ballycurraginny	311	Imokilly	Killeagh	Youghal
Ballydaheen	132	Imokilly	Clonpriest	Youghal
Ballydaheen	16	Imokilly	Ardagh	Youghal
Ballydaniel	1,157	Imokilly	Ardagh	Youghal
Ballydaniel	408	Imokilly	Kilmacdonogh	Youghal
Ballydavid	148	Imokilly	Cloyne	Midleton
Ballydekin	257	Imokilly	Midleton	Midleton
Ballyduff	316	Imokilly	Cloyne	Midleton
Ballydwyre	136	Imokilly	Rostellan	Midleton
Ballyfin	355	Imokilly	Inch	Midleton
Ballyfin	5	Imokilly	Cloyne	Midleton
Ballyfleming	264	Imokilly	Kilmacdonogh	Youghal
Ballygeany	234	Imokilly	Cloyne	Midleton
Ballygibbon	208	Imokilly	Mogeely	Midleton
Ballyglassin	475	Imokilly	Killeagh	Youghal
Ballyglavin	272	Imokilly	Ardagh	Youghal
Ballygrunna	170	Imokilly	Ardagh	Youghal
Ballyhimikin	318	Imokilly	Garryvoe	Midleton
Ballyhobert	316	Imokilly	Youghal	Youghal
Ballyhonock	106	Imokilly	Kilmacdonogh	Youghal
Ballyhonock	347	Imokilly	Ightermurragh	Midleton
Ballyhook	439	Imokilly	Corkbeg	Midleton
Ballykenefick	195	Imokilly	Inch	Midleton
Ballykilty	335	Imokilly	Clonpriest	Youghal
Ballykineally	329	Imokilly	Kilmacdonogh	Youghal
Ballyknock	115	Imokilly	Cloyne	Midleton
Ballyknock	165	Imokilly	Ardagh	Youghal
Ballyknock	167	Imokilly	Trabolgan	Midleton
Ballyknock	279	Imokilly	Dungourney	Midleton
Ballylanders	322	Imokilly	Ballintemple	Midleton
Ballyling	114	Imokilly	Ightermurragh	Midleton
Ballyloagane	175	Imokilly	Kilmahon	Midleton
Ballymacandrick	155	Imokilly	Inch	Midleton
Ballymacandrick	228	Imokilly	Cloyne	Midleton
Ballymacask	249	Imokilly	Youghal	Youghal
Ballymackibbot	171	Imokilly	Ardagh	Youghal
**Ballymacoda**	Town	Imokilly	Kilmacdonogh	Youghal
Ballymacoda	552	Imokilly	Kilmacdonogh	Youghal
Ballymacooly Beg	163	Imokilly	Mogeely	Midleton
Ballymacooly More	270	Imokilly	Mogeely	Midleton
Ballymacotter	260	Imokilly	Ballintemple	Midleton
Ballymadog	365	Imokilly	Clonpriest	Youghal
Ballymakeagh	333	Imokilly	Kilmacdonogh	Youghal
Ballymakeagh Beg	177	Imokilly	Killeagh	Youghal
Ballymakeagh More	377	Imokilly	Killeagh	Youghal
Ballymaloe Beg	170	Imokilly	Kilmahon	Midleton
Ballymaloe More	241	Imokilly	Kilmahon	Midleton
Ballynacarriga	237	Imokilly	Killeagh	Youghal
Ballynacarriga	27	Imokilly	Youghal	Youghal
**Ballynacorra**	Town	Imokilly	Midleton	Midleton
Ballynacorra	119	Imokilly	Midleton	Midleton
Ballynacorra East	155	Imokilly	Midleton	Midleton
Ballynacorra West	251	Imokilly	Midleton	Midleton
Ballynafarsid	120	Imokilly	Aghada	Midleton
Ballynaheila	94	Imokilly	Ardagh	Youghal
Ballynalahagh	405	Imokilly	Killeagh	Youghal
Ballynametagh	238	Imokilly	Mogeely	Midleton
Ballynamona	462	Imokilly	Kilmahon	Midleton
Ballynascarty	477	Imokilly	Ballyoughtera	Midleton
Ballyneague	222	Imokilly	Ardagh	Youghal
Ballynookery	395	Imokilly	Aghada	Midleton
Ballyonane	111	Imokilly	Cloyne	Midleton
Ballypherode	331	Imokilly	Kilmacdonogh	Youghal
Ballyquirk	198	Imokilly	Killeagh	Youghal
Ballyre	660	Imokilly	Dangandonovan	Midleton
Ballyregan	193	Imokilly	Cloyne	Midleton
Ballyriorthy	157	Imokilly	Dungourney	Midleton
Ballyrobin North	82	Imokilly	Ballintemple	Midleton
Ballyrobin South	361	Imokilly	Ballintemple	Midleton
Ballyroe	225	Imokilly	Cloyne	Midleton
Ballyrussell	299	Imokilly	Cloyne	Midleton
Ballyshane	458	Imokilly	Inch	Midleton
Ballysimon	149	Imokilly	Dungourney	Midleton
Ballyskibbole	83	Imokilly	Kilmacdonogh	Youghal
Ballysovane	84	Imokilly	Aghada	Midleton
Ballytibbot	292	Imokilly	Inch	Midleton
Ballytigeen	119	Imokilly	Corkbeg	Midleton
Ballytrasna	66	Imokilly	Kilmahon	Midleton
Ballyvaloon	210	Imokilly	Corkbeg	Midleton
Ballyvergan East	207	Imokilly	Youghal	Youghal
Ballyvergan West	368	Imokilly	Youghal	Youghal
Ballyvorisheen	121	Imokilly	Mogeely	Midleton
Ballywilliam	363	Imokilly	Ballintemple	Midleton
Banshy	44	Imokilly	Youghal	Youghal
Barnabrow	342	Imokilly	Cloyne	Midleton
Barnageehy East	247	Imokilly	Youghal	Youghal
Barnageehy West	217	Imokilly	Youghal	Youghal
Barnaviddane	261	Imokilly	Ardagh	Youghal
Barnfield	78	Imokilly	Ightermurragh	Midleton
Barradaw	706	Imokilly	Dangandonovan	Midleton
Bawnadoune	104	Imokilly	Dungourney	Midleton
Bawnard East	142	Imokilly	Midleton	Midleton
Bawnard West	207	Imokilly	Midleton	Midleton
Bawnmore	41	Imokilly	Youghal	Youghal
Beanfield	274	Imokilly	Clonpriest	Youghal
Bohillane	284	Imokilly	Bohillane	Midleton
Breeda	1,274	Imokilly	Ardagh	Youghal
Bridgefield	196	Imokilly	Ightermurragh	Midleton
Bridgetown	177	Imokilly	Ightermurragh	Midleton
Brooklodge	6	Imokilly	Youghal	Youghal
Broomfield East	444	Imokilly	Midleton	Midleton
Broomfield West	365	Imokilly	Midleton	Midleton
Buckstown	234	Imokilly	Aghada	Midleton
Burgary	60	Imokilly	Cloyne	Midleton
Burges Lower	443	Imokilly	Clonpriest	Youghal
Burges Upper	101	Imokilly	Clonpriest	Youghal
Butlerstown	174	Imokilly	Midleton	Midleton
Cahermone	171	Imokilly	Midleton	Midleton
Caherultan	122	Imokilly	Ballyoughtera	Midleton
Capel Island	10	Imokilly	Kilmacdonogh	Youghal
Carewswood	112	Imokilly	Ightermurragh	Midleton
Carhoo	192	Imokilly	Killeagh	Youghal
Carlislefort	140	Imokilly	Corkbeg	Midleton
Carrigacrump	195	Imokilly	Inch	Midleton
Carrigagour	124	Imokilly	Midleton	Midleton
Carriganass	211	Imokilly	Ardagh	Youghal
Carrigarostig	103	Imokilly	Ightermurragh	Midleton
Carrigatogher	128	Imokilly	Cloyne	Midleton
Carrigeennamoe	29	Imokilly	Midleton	Midleton
Carrigkilter	155	Imokilly	Ballintemple	Midleton
Carriglusky	29	Imokilly	Cloyne	Midleton
Carriglusky	79	Imokilly	Inch	Midleton
Carrignashinny	372	Imokilly	Mogeely	Midleton
Carrigshane	278	Imokilly	Midleton	Midleton
**Castlemartyr**	Town	Imokilly	Ightermurragh	Midleton
**Castlemartyr**	Town	Imokilly	Mogeely	Midleton
Castlemartyr	30	Imokilly	Mogeely	Midleton
Castlemartyr	648	Imokilly	Ballyoughtera	Midleton
Castlemary	587	Imokilly	Inch	Midleton
Castleredmond	486	Imokilly	Midleton	Midleton
Castlerichard	293	Imokilly	Ightermurragh	Midleton
Castletown	394	Imokilly	Mogeely	Midleton
**Churchtown**	Town	Imokilly	Ballintemple	Midleton
Churchtown	46	Imokilly	Ballintemple	Midleton
Clashadunna East	100	Imokilly	Youghal	Youghal
Clashadunna West	144	Imokilly	Youghal	Youghal
Clasharinka	96	Imokilly	Mogeely	Midleton
Clashdermot East	44	Imokilly	Killeagh	Youghal
Clashdermot West	50	Imokilly	Killeagh	Youghal
Clasheel	162	Imokilly	Clonpriest	Youghal
Claycastle	61	Imokilly	Youghal	Youghal
Clonard East	196	Imokilly	Clonpriest	Youghal
Clonard West	118	Imokilly	Clonpriest	Youghal
Clonmaine	348	Imokilly	Ightermurragh	Midleton
Clonpriest East	114	Imokilly	Clonpriest	Youghal
Clonpriest West	281	Imokilly	Clonpriest	Youghal
**Cloyne**	Town	Imokilly	Cloyne	Midleton
Cock-and-the-Bull	24	Imokilly	Youghal	Youghal
Colerenagh	38	Imokilly	Clonpriest	Youghal
Commons East	317	Imokilly	Cloyne	Midleton
Commons West	30	Imokilly	Cloyne	Midleton
Coolaha	71	Imokilly	Clonpriest	Youghal
Coolbea	222	Imokilly	Inch	Midleton
Coolcap	407	Imokilly	Mogeely	Midleton
Coolcloghafinna	221	Imokilly	Clonpriest	Youghal
Copperalley	36	Imokilly	Youghal	Youghal
Coppingerstown	247	Imokilly	Midleton	Midleton
Corbally	176	Imokilly	Dangandonovan	Youghal
Corbally	36	Imokilly	Killeagh	Youghal
Corkbeg	359	Imokilly	Corkbeg	Midleton
Cornaveigh	124	Imokilly	Clonpriest	Youghal
Cornaveigh	161	Imokilly	Ardagh	Youghal
Couragh	236	Imokilly	Dungourney	Midleton
Creighmore	270	Imokilly	Clonpriest	Youghal
Crocane	400	Imokilly	Rostellan	Midleton
Crowbally	241	Imokilly	Mogeely	Midleton
Curragh	123	Imokilly	Aghada	Midleton
Curraghboy	226	Imokilly	Youghal	Youghal
Curraghishal	232	Imokilly	Killeagh	Youghal
Curraghleagh	95	Imokilly	Kilmacdonogh	Youghal
Curragrine	140	Imokilly	Ballyoughtera	Midleton
Curraheen	191	Imokilly	Kilmacdonogh	Youghal
Deer Park	391	Imokilly	Mogeely	Midleton
Demesne	368	Imokilly	Cloyne	Midleton
Donickmore	694	Imokilly	Clonmult	Midleton
Dooneenmacotter	131	Imokilly	Kilmahon	Midleton
Dower	270	Imokilly	Mogeely	Midleton
Dower	30	Imokilly	Ightermurragh	Midleton
Drishane Beg	168	Imokilly	Ardagh	Youghal
Drishane More	213	Imokilly	Killeagh	Youghal
Dromadda Beg	219	Imokilly	Ightermurragh	Midleton
Dromadda East	8	Imokilly	Ightermurragh	Midleton
Dromadda More	195	Imokilly	Ballyoughtera	Midleton
Dromdihy	141	Imokilly	Killeagh	Youghal
Drominane	385	Imokilly	Mogeely	Midleton
Dromsarane	185	Imokilly	Ballyoughtera	Midleton
Dunsfort	141	Imokilly	Midleton	Midleton
Dysart	29	Imokilly	Youghal	Youghal
Farrannamanagh	84	Imokilly	Cloyne	Midleton
Farrantrenchard	129	Imokilly	Ballyoughtera	Midleton
**Farsid**	Town	Imokilly	Aghada	Midleton
Finisk	143	Imokilly	Kilmacdonogh	Youghal
Finisk	263	Imokilly	Clonpriest	Youghal
Finure	396	Imokilly	Corkbeg	Midleton
Fortyacres	51	Imokilly	Killeagh	Midleton
Foxhole	94	Imokilly	Youghal	Youghal
Garrananassig	145	Imokilly	Bohillane	Midleton
Garranejames	392	Imokilly	Mogeely	Midleton
Garranekinnefeake	642	Imokilly	Garranekinnefeake	Midleton
Garrymore	266	Imokilly	Ightermurragh	Midleton
Garryoughtragh North	143	Imokilly	Mogeely	Midleton
Garryoughtragh South	27	Imokilly	Mogeely	Midleton
Garryvoe Lower	514	Imokilly	Garryvoe	Midleton
Garryvoe Upper	241	Imokilly	Garryvoe	Midleton
Gearagh	258	Imokilly	Midleton	Midleton
Glanagow	138	Imokilly	Corkbeg	Midleton
Glanaradotia	27	Imokilly	Youghal	Youghal
Glanturkin	385	Imokilly	Corkbeg	Midleton
Glebe	10	Imokilly	Ballintemple	Midleton
Glebe	10	Imokilly	Clonpriest	Youghal
Glebe	14	Imokilly	Midleton	Midleton
Glenane Beg	219	Imokilly	Killeagh	Youghal
Glenane More	373	Imokilly	Mogeely	Midleton
Glenane Wood	24	Imokilly	Mogeely	Midleton
Glenaphuca	282	Imokilly	Dungourney	Midleton
Glenawilling	403	Imokilly	Kilmacdonogh	Youghal
Glenbradagh	113	Imokilly	Aghada	Midleton
Glennageare East	270	Imokilly	Ballyoughtera	Midleton
Glennageare West	296	Imokilly	Ballyoughtera	Midleton
Gortaroo	302	Imokilly	Clonpriest	Youghal
Gortavadda	136	Imokilly	Kilmacdonogh	Youghal
Gortavella	92	Imokilly	Kilmacdonogh	Youghal
Gortcorcoran	348	Imokilly	Kilmacdonogh	Youghal
Gortnagappul	449	Imokilly	Killeagh	Youghal
Gortnagark	46	Imokilly	Clonpriest	Youghal
Gortnahomna Beg	30	Imokilly	Ightermurragh	Midleton
Gortnahomna More	96	Imokilly	Ightermurragh	Midleton
Gortnaskehy	153	Imokilly	Kilmacdonogh	Youghal
Gortstoke	190	Imokilly	Ballyoughtera	Midleton
Grange	96	Imokilly	Mogeely	Midleton
Greencloyne	33	Imokilly	Youghal	Youghal
Gurteenina	124	Imokilly	Ballyoughtera	Midleton
Gurteenina	42	Imokilly	Cloyne	Midleton
**Gyleen**	Town	Imokilly	Corkbeg	Midleton
Hermitage	155	Imokilly	Aghada	Midleton
Ightermurragh	356	Imokilly	Ightermurragh	Midleton
Imokishy	89	Imokilly	Ightermurragh	Midleton
Inch	387	Imokilly	Inch	Midleton
Inchanapisha	42	Imokilly	Killeagh	Youghal
Inchiquin	409	Imokilly	Clonpriest	Youghal
Innygraga	222	Imokilly	Midleton	Midleton
Jamesbrook	217	Imokilly	Garranekinnefeake	Midleton
Kennel	159	Imokilly	Youghal	Youghal
Kilballycurrane	112	Imokilly	Cloyne	Midleton
Kilbarraree	141	Imokilly	Cloyne	Midleton
Kilbeg	189	Imokilly	Ightermurragh	Midleton
Kilboy	168	Imokilly	Cloyne	Midleton
Kilbree	252	Imokilly	Ballyoughtera	Midleton
Kilcounty	936	Imokilly	Dangandonovan	Midleton
Kilcraheen	317	Imokilly	Ightermurragh	Midleton
Kilcredan	502	Imokilly	Kilcredan	Midleton
Kilcrone	62	Imokilly	Cloyne	Midleton
Kilderrig	207	Imokilly	Ballintemple	Midleton
Kilgrellane	89	Imokilly	Cloyne	Midleton
Killamucky	334	Imokilly	Mogeely	Midleton
**Killeagh**	Town	Imokilly	Killeagh	Youghal
Killeagh	427	Imokilly	Midleton	Midleton
Killeagh Gardens	37	Imokilly	Killeagh	Youghal
Killeennamanagh	503	Imokilly	Mogeely	Midleton
Killinagh	40	Imokilly	Cloyne	Midleton
Killurriga	171	Imokilly	Ballyoughtera	Midleton
Kilmacahill	561	Imokilly	Cloyne	Midleton
Kilmagner	164	Imokilly	Youghal	Youghal
Kilmountain	282	Imokilly	Ballyoughtera	Midleton
Kilnasudry	23	Imokilly	Killeagh	Youghal
Kilnatoora	128	Imokilly	Youghal	Youghal
Kilrush	359	Imokilly	Mogeely	Midleton
Kilva	261	Imokilly	Cloyne	Midleton
Knockacrump	203	Imokilly	Cloyne	Midleton
Knockadoon	243	Imokilly	Kilmacdonogh	Youghal
Knockadoon(Warren)	247	Imokilly	Kilmacdonogh	Midleton
Knockane	161	Imokilly	Killeagh	Midleton
Knockane	93	Imokilly	Ightermurragh	Midleton
Knockanemorney	227	Imokilly	Aghada	Midleton
Knockanenakirka	448	Imokilly	Dangandonovan	Midleton
Knockasturkeen	118	Imokilly	Cloyne	Midleton
Knockasturkeen	93	Imokilly	Midleton	Midleton
Knockattigan	87	Imokilly	Youghal	Youghal
Knockaverry	112	Imokilly	Youghal	Youghal
Knockboghil	69	Imokilly	Titeskin	Midleton
Knockglass	554	Imokilly	Ightermurragh	Midleton
Knockgorm	145	Imokilly	Killeagh	Youghal
Knockgorm	68	Imokilly	Cloyne	Midleton
Knockgorm	94	Imokilly	Midleton	Midleton
Knockgriffin (Imokilly)	386	Imokilly	Mogeesha	Midleton
Knockmonalea East	285	Imokilly	Clonpriest	Youghal
Knockmonalea West	265	Imokilly	Clonpriest	Youghal
Knocknacally	143	Imokilly	Youghal	Youghal
Knocknagappagh	479	Imokilly	Ardagh	Youghal
Knocknamadderee	346	Imokilly	Cloyne	Midleton
Knocknaskagh	180	Imokilly	Killeagh	Youghal
Kyle	310	Imokilly	Clonpriest	Youghal
**Lady's Bridge**	Town	Imokilly	Ightermurragh	Midleton
Lady's Bridge	4	Imokilly	Ightermurragh	Midleton
Lagile	136	Imokilly	Killeagh	Youghal
Lahard	321	Imokilly	Inch	Midleton
Lickane	65	Imokilly	Cloyne	Midleton
Lisglasheen	49	Imokilly	Killeagh	Youghal
Lismalaghlin	185	Imokilly	Mogeely	Midleton
Lisquinlan	756	Imokilly	Ightermurragh	Midleton
Lissacrue	138	Imokilly	Killeagh	Youghal
Lissanly	169	Imokilly	Inch	Midleton
Loughaderry	189	Imokilly	Ballyoughtera	Midleton
Loughane	287	Imokilly	Bohillane	Midleton
Loughatalia	218	Imokilly	Midleton	Midleton
Lugfree	92	Imokilly	Inch	Midleton
Lurrig	97	Imokilly	Rostellan	Midleton
Magnershill	62	Imokilly	Youghal	Youghal
Malapardas	7	Imokilly	Cloyne	Midleton
Mawbrin	76	Imokilly	Titeskin	Midleton
Maytown	372	Imokilly	Ballintemple	Midleton
Meelshane	257	Imokilly	Ballyoughtera	Midleton
Meenoughter	278	Imokilly	Ardagh	Youghal
**Midleton**	Town	Imokilly	Midleton	Midleton
**Midleton**	Town	Imokilly	Mogeesha	Midleton
Moanlahan	48	Imokilly	Killeagh	Youghal
Moanroe	111	Imokilly	Garryvoe	Midleton
Mogeely	259	Imokilly	Mogeely	Midleton
Monabraher	79	Imokilly	Ardagh	Youghal
Monabraher	99	Imokilly	Killeagh	Youghal
Monacreagh	193	Imokilly	Ightermurragh	Midleton
Monagoul	184	Imokilly	Kilmacdonogh	Youghal
Monagurra	287	Imokilly	Kilmahon	Midleton
Monavarnoge	393	Imokilly	Ardagh	Youghal
Monearaniska	31	Imokilly	Cloyne	Midleton
Monearmore	85	Imokilly	Clonpriest	Youghal
Mosestown	158	Imokilly	Aghada	Midleton
Mountbell	244	Imokilly	Killeagh	Youghal
Mountcotton	203	Imokilly	Kilmacdonogh	Youghal
Mountuniacke	192	Imokilly	Killeagh	Youghal
Mountuniacke	35	Imokilly	Ardagh	Youghal
Muckridge	220	Imokilly	Youghal	Youghal
Muckridge Demesne	128	Imokilly	Youghal	Youghal
Mullarie	250	Imokilly	Clonpriest	Youghal
Oatencake	94	Imokilly	Mogeesha	Midleton
Park North	138	Imokilly	Midleton	Midleton
Park South	112	Imokilly	Midleton	Midleton
Parkmountain	71	Imokilly	Ardagh	Youghal
Parkmountain	84	Imokilly	Youghal	Youghal
Parknahyla	116	Imokilly	Ightermurragh	Midleton
Peafield	17	Imokilly	Aghada	Midleton
Pillmore	398	Imokilly	Clonpriest	Youghal
Pipersbog	38	Imokilly	Youghal	Youghal
Propoge	76	Imokilly	Youghal	Youghal
Rath	386	Imokilly	Ardagh	Youghal
Rathcallan	244	Imokilly	Dungourney	Midleton
Rathcanning	507	Imokilly	Dungourney	Midleton
**Rathcooursey**	Town	Imokilly	Garranekinnefeake	Midleton
Rathcoursey East	252	Imokilly	Garranekinnefeake	Midleton
Rathcoursey West	214	Imokilly	Garranekinnefeake	Midleton
Rathcuppoge	102	Imokilly	Cloyne	Midleton
Rathcuppoge	32	Imokilly	Titeskin	Midleton
Rathhaha	185	Imokilly	Garryvoe	Middeton
Redbarn	281	Imokilly	Clonpriest	Youghal
Ring	314	Imokilly	Kilmacdonogh	Youghal
Rooskagh	237	Imokilly	Bohillane	Midleton
Rostellan	31	Imokilly	Garranekinnefeake	Midleton
Rostellan	799	Imokilly	Rostellan	Midleton
Scarriff	192	Imokilly	Cloyne	Midleton
**Scartlea**	Town	Imokilly	Garranekinnefeake	Midleton
Scartlea Lower	78	Imokilly	Garranekinnefeake	Midleton
Scartlea Upper	104	Imokilly	Garranekinnefeake	Midleton
Schoolgardens	29	Imokilly	Ightermurragh	Midleton
School-land	16	Imokilly	Midleton	Midleton
Sculleen	270	Imokilly	Cloyne	Midleton
Seafield	80	Imokilly	Youghal	Youghal
**Shanagarry**	Town	Imokilly	Kilmahon	Midleton
Shanagarry	27	Imokilly	Bohillane	Midleton
Shanagarry North	439	Imokilly	Kilmahon	Midleton
Shanagarry South	179	Imokilly	Kilmahon	Midleton
Shanakill	304	Imokilly	Kilmacdonogh	Youghal
Shananee	168	Imokilly	Inch	Midleton
Shanavagoon	114	Imokilly	Bohillane	Midleton
Sheanliss	252	Imokilly	Cloyne	Midleton
Sleveen	247	Imokilly	Cloyne	Midleton
Spital	92	Imokilly	Cloyne	Midleton
Springfield	56	Imokilly	Youghal	Youghal
Summerfield	179	Imokilly	Youghal	Youghal
Sunville	51	Imokilly	Cloyne	Midleton
Sweetfields	53	Imokilly	Youghal	Youghal
Tead Beg	25	Imokilly	Cloyne	Midleton
Tead More	144	Imokilly	Cloyne	Midleton
Titeskin	237	Imokilly	Titeskin	Midleton
Townparks	107	Imokilly	Cloyne	Midleton
Townparks	316	Imokilly	Midleton	Midleton
Trabolgan	662	Imokilly	Trabolgan	Midleton
Tullagh	111	Imokilly	Ballintemple	Midleton
Tullagh	219	Imokilly	Cloyne	Midleton
Tullagh	27	Imokilly	Inch	Middeton
Tullaheen Beg	43	Imokilly	Inch	Midleton
Tullaheen More	67	Imokilly	Inch	Midleton
Whitebarn	48	Imokilly	Youghal	Youghal
**Whitegate**	Town	Imokilly	Aghada	Midleton
**Whitegate**	Town	Imokilly	Corkbeg	Midleton
Whiterock	202	Imokilly	Midleton	Midleton
Williamstown	21	Imokilly	Youghal	Youghal
Yellowford	173	Imokilly	Kilmacdonogh	Youghal
**Youghal**	Town	Imokilly	Youghal	Youghal
Youghal-lands	424	Imokilly	Youghal	Youghal
Youghal-park	394	Imokilly	Clonpriest	Youghal
Youghal-park	526	Imokilly	Ardagh	Youghal
