= Rathcormac =

Town in County Cork, Ireland

Rathcormac Irish: Ráth Chormaic
- Town
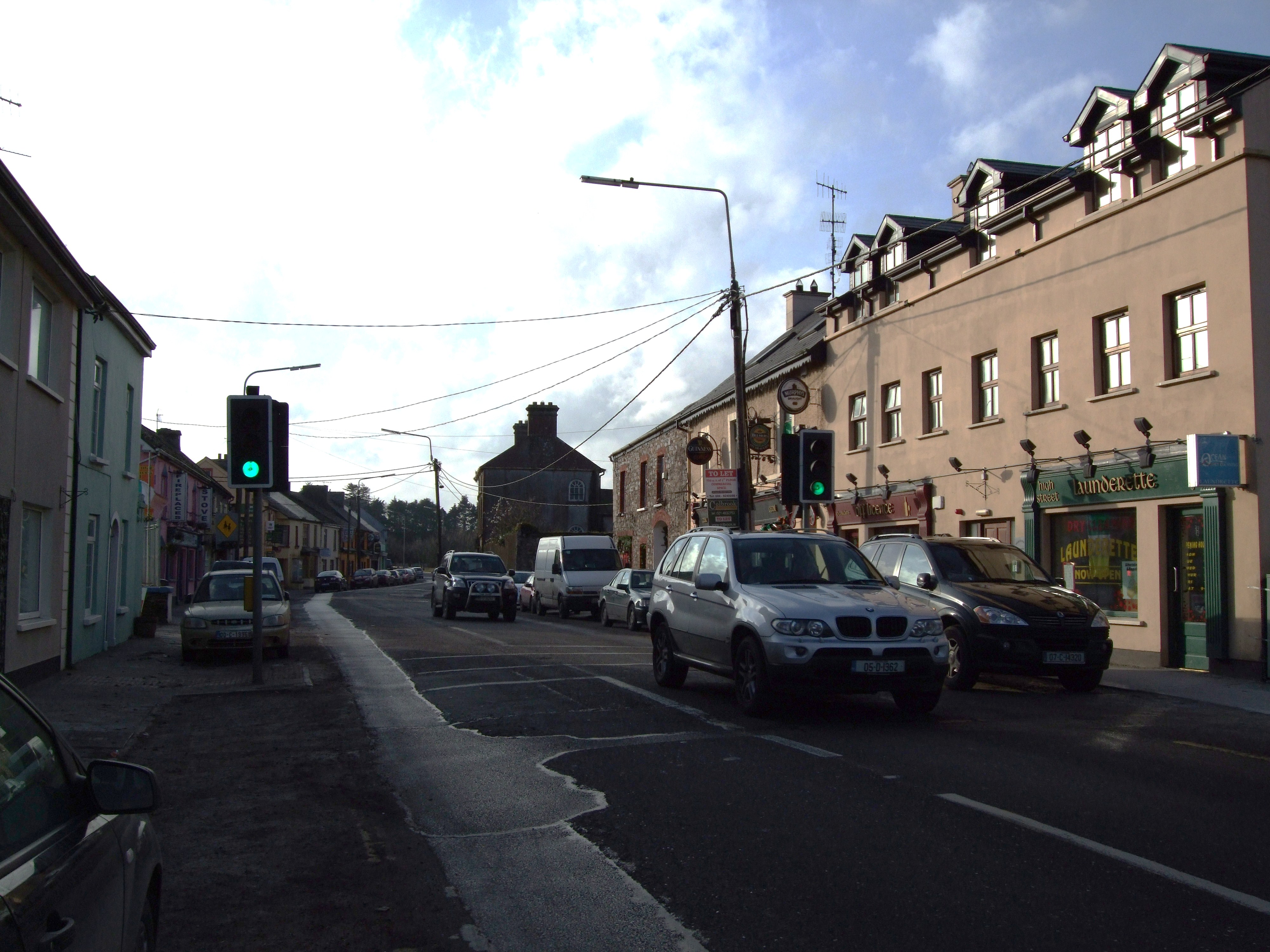
- Main Street

- Location in Ireland
- Coordinates: 52°04′37″N 8°16′55″W
- Country: Ireland
- Province: Munster
- County: Cork
- Elevation: 68 m (223 ft)

Population (2022)
  - Total: 1,957
- Time zone: UTC+0 (WET)
  - Summer (DST): UTC-1 (IST (WEST))
- Irish Grid Reference: W804920

Rathcormac (Irish: Ráth Chormaic, meaning 'Cormac's ringfort') is a small town in north County Cork, Ireland. Previously situated on the main Cork to Dublin road (the N8), it was bypassed in 2006 by the M8. The former N8 through the town's main street is now the R639 regional road. Rathcormac is located in the Blackwater Valley region and is part of the Cork East Dáil constituency.

== History ==
The Rathcormac massacre occurred at Bartlemy Cross southeast of Rathcormac on 18 December 1834, during the Tithe War.

Carntierna, an Iron Age royal site, is located to the north.

Rathcormac was known for wool cloth into the 20th century when Bluebell Woollen Mill supported hand weavers and spinners in the district since its establishment as a tuck mill in the 18th century.

== Sports ==
Rathcormac is home to Bride Rovers GAA club and Rathcormac Gun Club.

== People ==
In 1842 the Fenian and Australian architect, Joseph Nunan, was born here.

Two Canadian politicians, Patrick Joseph (Joe) O'Flynn (1921) and Denis Christopher O'Flynn (1923), were born in Rathcormac to John Joseph O'Flynn and Mary Cahill. In 1925, The O'Flynn family immigrated to Toronto, Ontario Canada. When the family landed in Canada, they dropped the "O" and became Flynn.

Joe O'Flynn went on to be elected to the Canadian House of Commons as the Member of Parliament for Kitchener, Ontario and Dennis O'Flynn (he changed the spelling) became Mayor of Etobicoke (a suburb of Toronto) and later was the Chairman of Metropolitan Toronto.

== See also ==
- List of towns and villages in Ireland
