= St Colman's College, Newry =

St. Colman's College, Violet Hill
- Coláiste Cholmáin, Cnoc na Sailchuach

Location
- 46 Armagh Road; Newry, County Armagh, BT35 6PP; Northern Ireland; 54.190050°N 6.341655°W

Information
- Motto: Bonitas, Disciplina, Scientia (Latin) •(“Kindness, Discipline, Knowledge”)
- Religious affiliation: Roman Catholic
- Established: 1823; 203 years ago
- Founder: Fr. J.S. Keenan
- Local authority: Education Authority (Southern)
- Principal: Cormac McKinney
- Gender: Boys
- Age: 11 to 18
- Enrolment: 860
- Houses: None
- Colours: Dark blue, grey & light blue
- Website: www.stcolmans.org.uk

St Colman's College is a Roman Catholic English-medium grammar school for boys, situated in Newry, County Armagh, Northern Ireland.

The college was founded in 1823 as the Dromore Diocesan Seminary by Father J. S. Keenan and placed under the patronage of Colmán of Dromore.

The College stands on Violet Hill, the same 60 acre (243,000 m²) site it has occupied since 1829, next to the Bishop of Dromore's residence, and the school itself is often referred to colloquially as Violet Hill.

== Motto ==
The school motto is Bonitas, Disciplina, Scientia which can be translated as Kindness, Discipline and Knowledge.

== College buildings ==
In the 1930s one of the most iconic buildings in the College complex was completed: the Chapel of Mary, the Immaculate Mother of God, constructed at the western end of the present frontage was solemnly consecrated by Bishop Edward Mulhern on 26 October 1938.

Further work continued in the post-war era as new science rooms, a dedicated design and technology block were all added to the college estate. In January 2008, 15 new classrooms and a multi-purpose hall became available for student use. A refurbishment of the existing College building and classrooms was completed in 2009, with all classrooms now equipped with interactive whiteboards. In addition to this, the grounds were developed with two tennis courts, 60 additional car parking spaces for students and teachers.

== Enrolment ==
As a grammar school, St Colman's selects on the basis of academic ability, primarily through the GL examination; it currently has 860 students attending. Enniskillen-born Cormac McKinney was appointed the first lay principal of the College in 2010.

== Academic results ==
In 2020, all of its 129 students who entered five or more GCSEs passed with grades A* to C including the core subjects English and Maths. Of the 109 students who entered A-level exams, 105 obtained at least 3 A-C* grades.

== Sports ==
=== Gaelic football ===
Aside from its academic work, St. Colman's is known as a nursery for Gaelic footballers for the senior men's teams of both Down and Armagh. The school is the most successful Ulster team in schools' Gaelic Football. In 2011 the College's senior Gaelic football team was Ulster and All-Ireland champions.

The College has a distinguished history in Gaelic football winning the premier colleges' trophy, the Hogan Cup, eight times in 1967, 1975, 1986, 1988, 1993, 1998, 2010 and 2011. Only St Jarlath's College, Tuam has won the All-Ireland competition on more occasions. The college remains the most successful Ulster college winning the MacRory Cup for the 20th time in 2020.

=== Other sports ===
Other sports offered at the College include, but are not limited to:

- handball
- basketball
- golf – St Colman's were Irish & Ulster Schools Champions in 1992 and former past pupil's Rory Leonard & Hilary Armstrong are current and former Irish Internationals. In 2017 St Colman's reached the Darren Clarke School Golf League Final in Lisburn Golf Club. They won on the day 3.5-3.5, winning by holes won.
- hurling
- rugby union

== Music ==
=== Orchestra ===
The school has a large orchestra, run by the Head of Music and with the help of additional instrumental tuition from local musicians.

The school also has a concert band and a big band.

St Colman's won the 2005, 2013, 2014, 2019, 2022, 2023 and 2024 Newry Feis Cup.

=== Choir ===
The school choir has worked with St George's Singers, Belfast and the Ulster Orchestra, the Irish College in Paris and Le Bec-Hellouin, mother house of the Order of Saint Benedict of Holy Cross Abbey, Rostrevor.

The choir has taken part in six editions of Morning Service for BBC Radio Ulster, broadcast live from the College's Chapel and St Brigid's Church, Newry. The trebles have performed live in Broadcasting House, Belfast as part of BBC Radio Ulster's Sounds Classical. The choir has also recorded with BBC Northern Ireland for the programmes O Little Town and Our Wee World. The choir were winners of the Southern Grammar School Regional Heat of the UTV School Choir of the Year 2005. The school choir allows students to develop team working skills as well as allowing them to develop sight singing and their overall musicality.

Also in 2005 the choir took part in the 20th anniversary of Sing Carols which was broadcast on BBC NI and BBC Radio Ulster. Their live BBC Radio Ulster's performance of Elaine Agnew's commissioned work Blessed was used on the promotional CD for the European Chamber Orchestra's educational programme throughout the European Union.

In Newry Musical Feis, the choir won the Secondary Schools Choir Competition in 2024, with the tenors and basses winning the plainsong competition.

=== Organ ===
The College Chapel has a two-manual pipe organ, originally built by Rieger Orgelbau and rebuilt and installed in the college chapel by Kenneth Jones & Associates, for the use of the students.

=== Traditional Group ===
The school Traditional Group has won the Newry Musical Feis multiple times, most recently in 2022. In 2023 the group placed 3rd in the competition which included seven schools and in 2024 the group placed 2nd in the competition out of five schools with a very high mark of 92.

== Abuse of pupils ==
In October 2017, the Diocese of Dromore settled the "biggest ever pay-out in a historical abuse case in Northern Ireland" over claims that Fr Malachy Finnegan, who was President of the College between 1976 and 1987, sexually abused a pupil. Finnegan, who died in 2002, was the subject of twelve abuse allegations made between 1994 and 2016. In the weeks following the scandal, the school removed all photographs depicting Fr Finnegan from the interior of its building. In 2025 a man successfully sued the Diocese of Dromore and the Board of Governors at St Colman's College in Newry over failures to protect him from the priest. He is to receive £170,000 in damages. It forms part of a settlement reached in his High Court action over historic physical and sexual assaults inflicted by the late Fr Malachy Finegan.

== Notable former pupils ==
- Thomas MacGivern (1829–1900), Catholic Bishop of Dromore
- Henry O'Neill (1843–1915), Catholic Bishop of Dromore
- Michael Cusack (1847–1906), founder of the Gaelic Athletic Association
- Frank Aiken (1898–1983), Tánaiste and Fianna Fáil TD for Louth
- Francis Gerard Brooks (1924–2010), Catholic Bishop of Dromore
- Hugh News (1931–2012), SDLP politician
- P. J. McElroy (1932–2022), Gaelic footballer
- John Magee (born 1936), former Roman Catholic Bishop of Cloyne
- Dan McCartan (1939–2024), Gaelic footballer and manager
- Leo Murphy (1939–2017), Gaelic footballer
- Paddy O'Hanlon (1944–2009), SDLP politician and barrister
- Lord Kerr of Tonaghmore (1948–2020), Justice of the Supreme Court and Lord Chief Justice of Northern Ireland
- John McAreavey (born 1949), former Catholic Bishop of Dromore
- Jimmy Smyth (born 1949), former Gaelic footballer and commentator
- Paddy Quinn (born 1952), Irish republican and hunger striker
- Eamon Collins (1954–1999), author and former Provisional IRA member
- Raymond McCreesh (1957–1981), Irish republican and hunger striker
- John Lynch (born 1961), actor
- Greg Blaney (born 1963), former Gaelic footballer
- John Fee (1963–2007), SDLP MLA for Newry and Armagh
- Cathal McCabe (born 1963), poet
- Frank Mitchell (born 1963), presenter on UTV
- Conor Murphy (born 1963), Sinn Féin senator and former MP for Newry and Armagh
- Jarlath Burns (born 1968), president of the Gaelic Athletic Association and former Gaelic footballer
- Dermott Lennon (born 1969), show jumper
- Benny Tierney (born 1969), former Gaelic footballer
- Francis Campbell (born 1970), diplomat and academic
- James McCartan Jr. (born 1970), former Gaelic footballer
- Diarmaid Marsden (born 1974), former Gaelic footballer
- Paul McGrane (born 1974), former Gaelic footballer
- Michael Legge (born 1978), actor
- Kevin Trainor (born 1983), actor
- Dáire Hughes (born 1990), Sinn Féin MP for Newry and Armagh
- Caolan Mooney (born 1993), Gaelic footballer and former Australian rules footballer
- Shay McCartan (born 1994), professional footballer
- Pearse Óg McCrickard (born 1996), hurler
- Oisín O'Neill (born 1997), Gaelic footballer
- Rian O'Neill (born 1998), Gaelic footballer
- Jan Rozmanowski (born 1999), singer and songwriter, known professionally as Jann
- John Farrelly (born 2000), filmmaker and screenwriter
- Charlie Smyth (born 2001), American football placekicker and former Gaelic footballer
- Paddy Mcateer (born ~2004), American football placekicker
