= Bishop of Dromore =

Episcopal position in County Down

The Bishop of Dromore is an episcopal title which takes its name after the original monastery of Dromore in County Down, Northern Ireland. In the Roman Catholic Church the title still continues as a separate bishopric, but in the Church of Ireland it has been united with other bishoprics.

== History ==
The monastery of Dromore is believed to have been founded by St Colman, first bishop or abbot of Dromore, sometime between 497 and 513. The first building was a small wattle and daub church on the northern bank of the River Lagan. Only a couple of the names of the monastic-bishops survive. Mael-Brigid Mac Cathasaigh, bishop and abbot of Dromore, died in 972, and in the Annals of Ulster record the death of Riagán, bishop of Druim Mór, in 1101.

The diocese of Dromore was established through the reorganisation of the Irish Church in the late 12th century, possibly at the synod held in Dublin in 1192 by the papal legate, Múirges Ua hÉnna, Archbishop of Cashel. The diocese coincided with the territory of the Uí Echach Cobo, which later became the baronies of Upper and Lower Iveagh, and the lordship of Newry, County Down.

Following the Reformation, there were parallel apostolic successions. In the Church of Ireland, the bishopric continued until it became part of the united bishopric of Down, Connor and Dromore in 1842. In 1945, Connor was separated leaving the current bishopric of Down and Dromore.

In the Roman Catholic Church, the bishopric of Dromore continues as a separate title. The most recent Incumbent was the Most Reverend John McAreavey, Bishop of the Roman Catholic Diocese of Dromore, who was appointed by the Holy See on 4 June 1999 and was ordained bishop on 19 September 1999. He resigned on 1 March 2018, effective 26 March 2018.

== List of bishops ==
=== Pre-Reformation bishops ===
Pre-Reformation Bishops of Dromore
From	Until	Incumbent	Notes
bef. 1197	unknown	Ua Ruanada	Named as the bishop of Uveghe (Iveagh) in a grant by Echmílid, Bishop of Down.
1227	unknown	Geraldus OCist	Formerly a monk of Mellifont Abbey; elected bishop bef. 15 April 1227 and confirmed by King Henry III 25 April 1227; death date unknown.
1245	unknown	Andreas	Andrew; formerly Archdeacon of Dromore; elected bef. 1 October 1245 and obtained the royal assent on that date; consecrated in late 1245; death date unknown.
c. 1284	1309	Tigernach (I)	Elected c. 1284; died in office.
1290	unknown	Gervasius	Also known as Gervase. Appointed bishop in 1290; death date unknown.
unknown	1309	Tigernach (II)	Formerly a monk; died in office.
c. 1309	unknown	Florentius Mac Donnacáin	Florence McDonegan; formerly a Canon of Dromore; elected by the dean and chapter in 1309; confirmed by the king.
1351	unknown	(Name not known)	Enech or Enoch; appointed by papal mandate.
1366	unknown	Milo	Appointed by the Archbishop of Armagh's mandate 20 October 1366.
1369	unknown	Christophorus	Also known as Christopher. Appointed by the Archbishop of Armagh's mandate 28 August 1369.
1382		Cornelius	No date of appointment; died bef. November 1382.
1382	unknown	John OFM	John O'Lannub or O Lannubh.; provided by Pope Urban VI; appointed sometime between 14 June and 15 July 1382; received temporalities 10 November 1382; death date unknown.
1398	1406	Thomas Orwell OFM	Also known as Horewell. Translated from Killala bef. November 1398; acted as a suffragan bishop in the dioceses of Ely and Norwich 1389–1406; died aft. 1406.
1400	1402	John Waltham OSA	Also known as Volcan. Translated from Ossory 14 May 1400; translated back to Ossory 11 October 1402.
1402	1407	Roger Appleby OFM	Also known as De Appleby. Translated from Ossory 11 October 1402; absentee bishop 1402–07; translated to Waterford and Lismore bef. October 1407.
1407	1410	Richard Payl OP	Also known as Paylus or Messing. Appointed 30 December 1407; consecrated bef. 11 November 1408; translated to Sodor and Man 30 May 1410.
1410	1418	John Chourles OSB	Also known as Curlw or Thouras. Appointed 16 July 1410 and consecrated bef. 4 January 1411; resigned in 1418; acted as a suffragan bishop in the dioceses of Canterbury 1420–33, London 1419–26, and Rochester 1423; died 12 June 1433 and buried at St Mary Somerset, London, where he had been rector of the church.
aft. 1410	1429	Marcus	He was given authority by Nicholas Fleming, Archbishop of Armagh, as 'a bishop sojourning in the diocese of Dromore', to correct certain offenders; he does not appear to have been the actual bishop of the see; died bef. 31 January 1429.
bef. 1414	unknown	Seaán Ó Ruanadha	Known to be bishop around 1414, but nothing further known.
1419	unknown	Nicholas Warte OFM	Also known as Wartre. Provided by Pope Martin V 17 March 1419; appears to have resigned and retired to England (date unknown); acted as a suffragan bishop in the diocese of York 1420–1445, and was Rector of St Mary's Church, Castlegate, York; died aft. 1445.
1429	1453	Thomas Rackelf OSA (Note: From 1431 to 1453, Dromore was nominally governed by absentee bishops, of whom at least two were simultaneously using the title of bishop of Dromore whilst acting as suffragans in various English dioceses.)	Also known as Radcliffe. Appointed 31 January 1429; consecrated 21 December 1433; acted as a suffragan bishop in the diocese of Durham 1441–1446; died 1453.
unknown	1431	William	No date of appointment; died bef. June 1431.
1431	unknown	David Chirbury OCarm	Appointed 22 June 1431, but appears to have vacated the see soon afterwards; acted as a suffragan bishop in the diocese of St David's in 1437; died aft. 1451.
1434?	1440	Thomas Scrope OCarm	Thomas Bradley; possibly appointed in 1434; resigned bef. 1440; acted as a suffragan bishop in the dioceses of Norwich 1450–1477 and Canterbury 1469; died 15 January 1492.
1450	1454/55	Thomas Radcliff	Consecrated 1 February 1450; resigned 1454 or 1455; acted as a suffragan bishop in the diocese of Durham until 1487.
c. 1454/55	unknown	Donatus Ó h-Anluain	Also known as Donat Ohendua or O'Hand. Appointed 1454 or 1455; consecrated aft. 17 April 1456; death date unknown.
1457	1463	Richard Messing OCarm	Also known as Myssin. Appointed 29 July 1457; acted as a suffragan bishop in the diocese of York 1458–1462; died aft. June 1463.
1463	unknown	William Egremond OESA	Appointment 15 June 1463; acted as a suffragan bishop in the diocese of York 1463–1501; died aft. 1501.
unknown	1476	Aonghus	Aeneas; appointment date is unknown; died bef. August 1476.
1476	1480	Robert Kirk OCist	Appointed 28 August 1476; died bef. April 1480.
1480	1483	Yvo Guillen	Also known as Yvo Guillen Brito . Formerly a Canon of St Malo; appointed 14 April 1480; died bef. April 1483.
1483	1499	Georgios Vranas	Georgius de Brana, George Braua, Geo. Braun or 'an-t-easbog Gréagach'; a Greek by birth; formerly Procurator of Indulgences and Vicar-General of the Hospital of the Holy Ghost; appointed bishop 18 April and consecrated 3 May 1483; acted as a suffragan bishop in the dioceses of Worcester and London 1497; translated to Elphin 15 April 1499.
1499	1511	See vacant	
1511	1526	Tadhg Ó Raghallaigh OESA	Also known as Thaddeaus or Thady O'Reilly; appointed 30 April 1511; acted as a suffragan bishop in the diocese of London 1511; also was appointed Bishop of Ross on 23 December 1519; died bef. June 1526.

=== Post-Reformation Church of Ireland bishops ===
Church of Ireland Bishops of Dromore
From	Until	Incumbent	Notes
1526	1550	See vacant	
1550	c. 1575	Arthur Magennis (Note: Arthur Magennis was bishop of both successions.)	A son of Murtagh Magennis of Corgary, near Newry, Lord of Iveagh, who was killed by the men of Louth in 1529. Arthur was the father of Murtagh 'McEnaspicke', literally 'son of the bishop' from which Atkinson infers that he 'must have been a married man'. Papal appointee in 1540, but renounced papal authority and was confirmed (re-appointed) by King Edward VI bef. 10 May 1550; absolved and recognised by Queen Mary I; died c. 1575.
c. 1575	1607	See vacant	
1607	1612	John Todd	Formerly Dean of Cashel; nominated to Dromore and to Down and Connor 24 January; appointed to all three by letters patent 16 May 1607; resigned 20 January 1612.
1612	1613	John Tanner	Nominated 9 February 1612; appointed by letters patent 7 January 1613; never consecrated; resigned 20 January 1612; appointed Bishop of Derry in 1612.
1613	1652	Theophilus Buckworth	Nominated 16 April; consecrated in May 1613; he was forced to flee to England because of the Irish Rebellion of 1641; died in Wisbech c. 8 September 1652.
1652	1660	See vacant	
1660	1661	Robert Leslie	Nominated 6 August 1660; consecrated 27 January 1661; translated to Raphoe 20 June 1661; his father was Henry Leslie, Bishop of Down and Connor (1635–1661).
1661	1667	See vacant	Jeremy Taylor, Bishop of Down and Connor, was appointed administrator of Dromore on 21 June 1661, and continued in the post until his death on 13 August 1667.
1667	1670	George Rust	Formerly Dean of Connor; nominated 27 September; consecrated 15 December 1667; died in December 1670.
1671	1683	Essex Digby	Formerly Dean of Cashel; nominated 6 January; consecrated 27 February 1671; died 12 May 1683.
1683	1694	Capel Wiseman	Formerly Dean of Raphoe; nominated 23 June; consecrated 23 September 1683; died in September 1694.
1695	1713	Tobias Pullein	Translated from Cloyne; nominated 17 March; appointed by letters patent 7 May 1695; died 22 January 1713.
1713	1717	John Sterne	Formerly Dean of St Patrick's, Dublin; nominated 23 April; consecrated 10 May 1713; translated to Clogher 30 May 1717.
1717	1727	Ralph Lambert	Formerly Dean of Down; nominated 14 May; consecrated 23 April 1717; translated to Meath 10 May 1727.
1727	1732	Charles Cobbe	Translated from Killala and Achonry; nominated 13 January; appointed by letters patent 16 February 1727; translated to Kildare 16 March 1732.
1732	1744	Henry Maule	Translated from Cloyne; nominated 18 February; appointed by letters patent 20 March 1732; translated to Meath 24 May 1744.
1744	1745	Thomas Fletcher	Formerly Dean of Down; nominated 10 May; consecrated 10 June 1744; translated to Kildare 14 May 1745.
1745		Jemmett Browne	Translated from Killaloe; nominated 26 April and; appointed by letters patent 16 May 1745; translated to Cork and Ross 27 August 1745.
1745	1763	George Marlay	Nominated 3 August; consecrated 15 September 1745; died 12 April 1763.
1763		John Oswald	Translated from Clonfert and Kilmacduagh; nominated 19 April; appointed by letters patent 7 May 1763; translated to Raphoe 25 August 1763.
1763	1765	Edward Young	Formerly Dean of Clogher; nominated 19 July; consecrated 16 October 1763; translated to Ferns and Leighlin 4 March 1765.
1765	1766	The Hon Henry Maxwell	Formerly Dean of Kilmore; nominated 8 February; consecrated 10 March 1765; translated to Meath 15 April 1766.
1766	1775	William Newcome	Nominated 28 February; consecrated 27 April 1766; translated to Ossory 13 April 1775.
1775	1780	James Hawkins	Formerly Dean of Emly; nominated 23 March; consecrated 29 April 1775; translated to Raphoe 1 April 1780.
1780	1782	The Hon William Beresford	Nominated 20 March; consecrated 8 April 1780; translated to Ossory 21 May 1782; his nephew Lord John Beresford was Archbishop of Armagh (1822–1862).
1782	1811	Thomas Percy	Formerly Dean of Carlisle; nominated 17 April; consecrated 26 May 1782; died 30 September 1811.
1811		George Hall	Formerly Provost of Trinity College Dublin; nominated 10 October; consecrated 17 November 1811; died 23 November 1811.
1811	1819	John Leslie	Formerly Dean of Cork; nominated 5 December 1811; consecrated 26 January 1812; translated to Elphin 16 November 1819.
1819	1842	James Saurin	Formerly Dean of Derry; nominated 2 November; consecrated 19 December 1819; died 9 April 1842.
In 1842, the see became part of the united bishopric of Down, Connor and Dromore

=== Post-Reformation Roman Catholic bishops ===
Roman Catholic Bishops of Dromore
From	Until	Incumbent	Notes
1536	c. 1539	Quintin Cogly OP	Appointed 29 May 1536; died c. 1539.
1539	unknown	Roger MacCiadh	Appointed 16 June 1539; death or end of episcopate unknown.
1540	c. 1575	Arthur Magennis	Appointed 16 April 1540, but renounced papal authority bef. 10 May 1550; absolved and recognized by Queen Mary I; died c. 1575.
1576	1589	Patrick MacCaul	Appointed 23 (or 26) January 1576; died bef. February 1589.
1589	1598	See vacant	
1598	unknown	Eugene MacGibbon	Appointed vicar apostolic by papal brief 20 February 1598.
1625	unknown	Patrick Hanratty	Formerly vicar apostolic of Down and Connor 1614–1625; appointed vicar apostolic of Dromore by papal brief 13 August 1625.
1647	1662	Oliver Darcy OP	Appointed 11 March 1647; consecrated 7 May 1648; died in 1662.
1662	1671	See vacant	
1671	unknown	Ronan Maginn	Appointed vicar apostolic by papal brief 30 June 1671.
1697	1716	Patrick Donnelly	Appointed 22 July 1697; died in 1716.
1716	1747	See vacant	1731–1747: Dromore was administered by the Archbishops of Armagh.
1747	1766	Anthony O'Garvey	Appointed 1 September 1747; died 24 August 1766.
1767	1770	Denis Maguire OFM	Appointed 10 February 1767; translated to Kilmore 20 March 1770.
1770	1780	Patrick Brady OFM	Appointed 10 April 1770; died 4 July 1780.
1780	1801	Matthew Lennan	Appointed 20 December 1780; died 22 January 1801.
1801	1819	Edmund Derry	Appointed 19 July 1801; died 29 October 1819.
1820	1825	Hugh O'Kelly	Appointed 30 January and consecrated 16 April 1820; died 14 August 1825.
1826	1833	Thomas Kelly	Appointed 4 June; consecrated 27 August 1826; translated to Armagh as coadjutor archbishop on 1 December 1828 (succeeded as Archbishop of Armagh on 26 July 1832); retained administration of Dromore until Blake was appointed bishop in 1833.
1833	1860	Michael Blake	Appointed 13 January; consecrated 17 March 1833; resigned 27 February 1860; died 6 March 1860.
1860	1890	John Pius Leahy OP	Appointed coadjutor bishop 7 July; consecrated 1 October 1854; succeeded 27 February 1860; died 6 September 1890.
1890	1900	Thomas MacGivern	Appointed coadjutor bishop 9 March; consecrated 6 May 1887; succeeded 6 September 1890; died 24 November 1900.
1901	1915	Henry O'Neill	Appointed 10 May; consecrated 7 July 1901; died 9 October 1915.
1916	1943	Edward Mulhern	Appointed 19 January; consecrated 30 April 1916; died 12 August 1943.
1944	1975	Eugene O'Doherty	Appointed 18 March; consecrated 28 May 1944; retired 22 November 1975; died 24 March 1979.
1976	1999	Francis Brooks	Appointed 22 November 1975; consecrated 25 January 1976; retired 4 June 1999.
1999	2018	John McAreavey	Appointed 4 June 1999; consecrated 19 September 1999; resigned 1 March 2018, effective 26 March 2018.
