= Thomas MacGivern =

Irish Bishop

- Bishop of Dromore
- Church: Catholic Church
- Diocese: Diocese of Dromore
- In office: 6 September 1890 – 24 November 1900
- Predecessor: John Pius Leahy
- Successor: Henry O'Neill
- Previous posts: Titular Bishop of Hippos (1887-1890); Coadjutor Bishop of Dromore (1887-1890)

Orders
- Ordination: 1854
- Consecration: 6 March 1887 by James Donnelly

Personal details
- Born: 20 December 1829 Annaclone, County Down, United Kingdom of Great Britain and Ireland
- Died: 24 November 1900 (aged 70) Newry, Counties Armagh and Down, United Kingdom of Great Britain and Ireland

Thomas McGivern, D.D. (20 December 1829 in Ballynanny, County Down – 24 November 1900 in Newry) was an Irish Catholic Priest who served as Bishop of Dromore from 1890 to 1900.

McGivern was educated at St Colman's College, Newry and The Irish College, Rome. He was ordained priest in 1854. After curacies at Ballynahinch and Newry he was parish priest at Drumgath from 1872 to 1887. He was ordained Coadjutor Bishop of Dromore in 1886 and its Diocesan in 1890, a post he held until his death.

Catholic Church titles
Preceded by John Pius Leahy	Bishop of Dromore; 1890–1900	Succeeded by Henry O'Neill
