= Newry Cathedral =

Church in Northern Ireland

Coordinates: 54°10′29″N 6°20′16″W

- Cathedral of Saint Patrick and Saint Colman
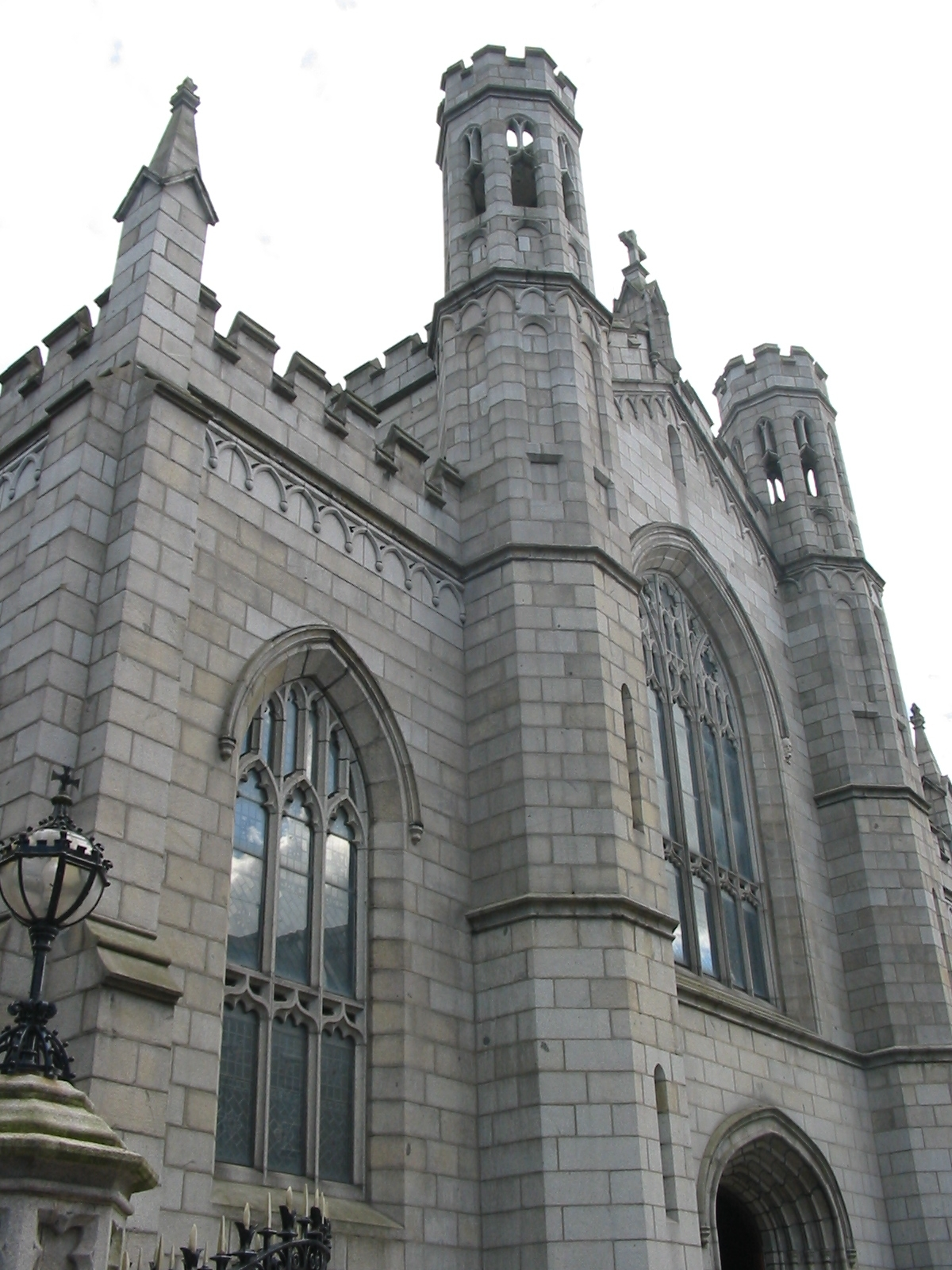

- Shown within Northern Ireland
- Location: Newry, County Down
- Address: Hill Street, Newry
- Country: Northern Ireland
- Language(s): English, Polish
- Denomination: Roman Catholic
- Tradition: Roman Rite
- Website: www.newrycathedralparish.org

History
- Former name: Saint Patrick's Cathedral
- Founder: Bishop Thomas O'Kelly
- Dedicated: 6 May 1829
- Consecrated: 21 July 1925
- Events: 150th Centenary - 21 July 1979

Architecture
- Heritage designation: Grade A listed
- Designated: 26 February 1976
- Architect: Thomas Duff George Ashlin
- Architectural type: Gothic Revival
- Style: Gothic
- Years built: 1825-1829, 1888-1890, 1904-1909
- Groundbreaking: 1825
- Completed: 1909
- Construction cost: £8,000 (£955,422 in 2025)

Specifications
- Capacity: 1,000
- Materials: Newry Granite

Administration
- Province: Armagh
- Metropolis: Armagh
- Archdiocese: Armagh
- Diocese: Dromore
- Parish: Newry Cathedral Parish

Clergy
- Bishop: Sede Vacante
- Dean: Canon Francis Brown Canon Francis Brown Canon Gerald Powell (Honorary Canons) Canon Francis Boyle Canon Michael Hackett Canon Aidan Hamill Canon John Kearney Canon Frank Kearney

The Cathedral of Saint Patrick and Saint Colman or Newry Cathedral is a Roman Catholic cathedral located in Newry, Northern Ireland. It is the seat of the Bishop of Dromore, and the Mother church of the Roman Catholic Diocese of Dromore. Prior to the COVID-19 pandemic, over 200,000 people visited the cathedral each year. The cathedral sits on Newry's Main Street and is a Grade A listed building.

The cathedral replaced St Mary's Church (the Old Chapel), which had been constructed by Bishop Lennan in 1789 and which, for forty years, doubled as both a parish church and quasi-cathedral, two bishops having received episcopal consecration there. Newry Cathedral, dedicated under the joint patronage of St Patrick & St Colman, was designed by the city's greatest native architect Thomas Duff; work began in 1825, with the basic building completed in 1829. Built of local granite, it was the first Catholic cathedral in Ireland opened after Catholic Emancipation.

Work continued to enlarge and beautify the cathedral at various stages in the late nineteenth and early twentieth centuries: the tower and transept were added in 1888 and the nave was extended in 1904 under the supervision of Bishop Henry O'Neill.

== History ==
=== Background ===
The See of Dromore was founded in the sixth century by Colman of Dromore, and has had its own independent jurisdiction ever since. The old cathedral of Dromore, which had been taken by the Protestants, was burnt down by the Irish insurgents in 1641 and rebuilt by Bishop Taylor twenty years later; the Catholic Church was erected later. In 1750 the seat of the cathedral was transferred to Newry, the largest town of County Down, situated at the head of Carlingford Lough.

=== Securing the site in 1823 ===
Bishop Thomas O'Kelly immediately after his appointment as Bishop, inaugurated plans for the building of the Cathedral. The old minute book of the committee in charge of St. Mary's, Chapel Street, tells of a meeting inspired by Bishop O'Kelly, in the house of Denis Callan, Mill Street, on the evening of Wednesday 7 March 1821, with Mark Devlin in the chair. The business of the meeting, at which Father Thomas O'Hare, ADM., was present, is recorded in the following resolutions:

Resolved, that as it appears to be anxious desire of all classes of the Roman Catholics of Newry that a new Chapel be erected in the centre of town, in order to carry into effect this desirable project, we now proceed to appoint by ballot five gentlemen who, in conjunction with our Bishop, will wait on his Lordship the Marquis of Downshire for the purpose of obtaining from him an eligible site for the erection of the edifice. The ballot being taken, the following gentlemen were chosen: Mark Devlin, John O'Hagan, John Arthur O'Hagan, Charles Jennings and Francis McCann.

Resolved, that our secretary do transmit notice to the above five gentlemen apprizing them of their having been chosen to form a deputation for the above purpose, and requesting them to meet in the house of Mr. John A. O'Hagan on the morning of Friday the 9th inst., at the hour of 10 o'clock precisely; thence to proceed to the Right Rev. Dr. O'Kelly to arrange with him when and how this deputation is to set out for Hillsbrough.

The deputation of leading Catholic citizens thus appointed duly visited Lord Downshire, for the Minute book later records that their expenses amounted to £6 4s. That they met with initial success seems unlikely, since two and a half years elapsed before the site was purchased. The original lease now presently stored in the episcopal archives shows that a grant of the "swamp beside the Mill Race, known as Seymour's Green," was obtained from John Johnson and James Coulter by Daniel Jennings and others, on behalf of the parish, on 20 September 1823.

=== Foundation stone ===
Details of the actual ceremony for the laying of the foundation stone are lacking. The Newry Telegraph records the fact that Bishop O’Kelly performed the ceremony on 8 June 1825. Under his successor, Dr. Thomas Kelly, work on the cathedral continued. Within four years, the fabric of the church was completed, and the dedication ceremony was performed by the Primate, Dr. Curtis, on 6 May 1829 at 12 O'clock. The dedication sermon was preached by Dr. Doyle, Bishop of Kildare and Leighlin. A contemporary writer referred to the ceremony as "the greatest attendance of Bishops and clergy seen for three centuries in the north of Ireland."

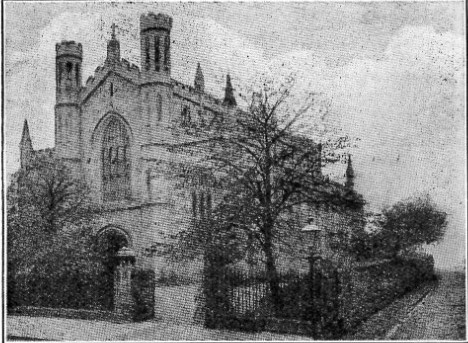
Newry Cathedral exterior in 1874

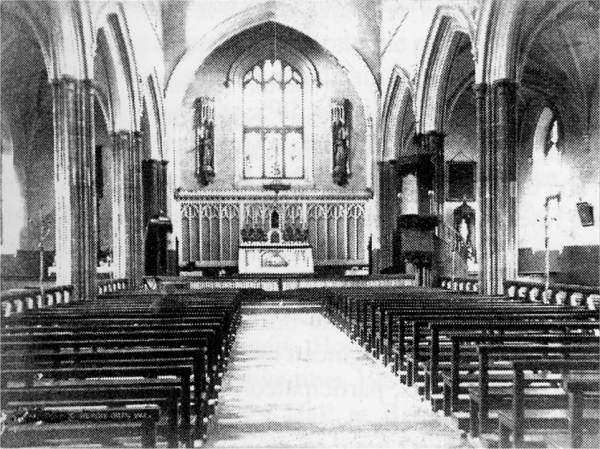
Newry Cathedral interior in 1874

The Bishops of the province dressed in Pontificals, walked in procession from the Sacristy to the Great West Door. After the Dedication ceremonies were concluded Solemn High Mass was offered. A collection was taken up by several Noblemen and Gentlemen to help defray the building costs. The sum of the collection was £141, 2s. 8d. The inside of the Cathedral was unfinished at the time of the Dedication. The galleries were also unfinished. Admission to the service was regulated by tickets at 5s. each. Upon opening the Cathedral was known as the Cathedral Church of St. Patrick. Locally it was known as the "New Chapel."

=== Second phase of the building, 1888 - 1890 ===
The second phase of the building works was undertaken between the years 1888 - 1890. shortly after the appointment of Dr. Thomas McGivern as Co-adjustor under Bishop Pius Leahy. The arrival of a Papal Envoy suggested to Bishop Leahy that his Cathedral Church was not in keeping with the dignity of the diocese; as a response Bishop Leahy initiated the Second Phase of the building work under the direction of Bishop McGivern. The structural extensions carried out came to a cost of over £12,000. In 1888 the two transepts were added, the south transept being smaller than the north transept due to the mill in what is now the Cathedral garden. In 1890 the Great Bell Tower was completed and a new sacristy was erected. In 1891 a new High Altar was erected in the sanctuary in memory of Bishop Leahy. Despite the tower being completed in 1890 the peal of joy bells was not installed until 1898; along with the toll bell which had previously been on a temporary structure behind the church. The Joy-Bells were installed through the bequest of Rev. Bernard McAleenan, Parish Priest of Tullylish.

=== Third phase of the building 1904 - 1909 ===
The third phase of building works was carried out under the direction of Bishop Henry O'Neill, who was Bishop of Dromore from 1901 - 1915. Monsignor Campbell a future administrator of the Cathedral Parish states, "it is to the refined taste and noble ideals of Bishop O'Neill, perhaps more than anyone else, that the proportions and grandeur of the Cathedral, as we know it today, are due." the architectural firm for the third scheme was Ashlin and Coleman of Dublin. Denis Neary who at the time was Newry's leading contractor was appointed contractor.

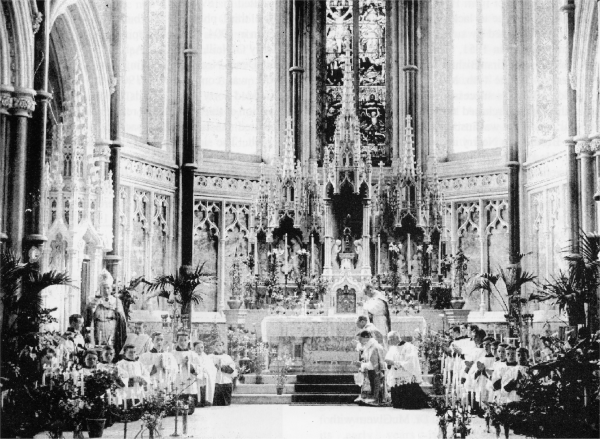
Newry Cathedral - 1910

The third phase of the scheme involved extending the body of the Cathedral 40 feet towards Hill Street and approximately 30 towards Lower Water Street. The entire original facade of the cathedral was demolished and rebuilt in its original form following the extension of the nave of the church. The Sacristy which had been built behind the original Sanctuary, was removed and rebuilt as originally designed, to the North-East corner where it currently stands. The new sanctuary was panelled in marble and divided off from the side chapels by carved rood screens in Carrara Marble. Five new stained glass windows, the work of Hardman of Manchester, were erected around the rear of the Sanctuary. The entire walls of the church from floor to ceiling, the sanctuary floor, the floors of the side-chapels and the passages of the nave, were covered in richly coloured mosaics. When Dr. O'Neill undertook his work there were many who considered his plans rather ambitious given the financial constraints of Diocesan coffers. However, sufficient funds kept coming which gave encouraging hope and work progressed smoothly.

Generous sums of money was raised by the parish and diocese, a number of priests were appointed to travel further afield to other parts of Ireland, England, Scotland and the United States of America.

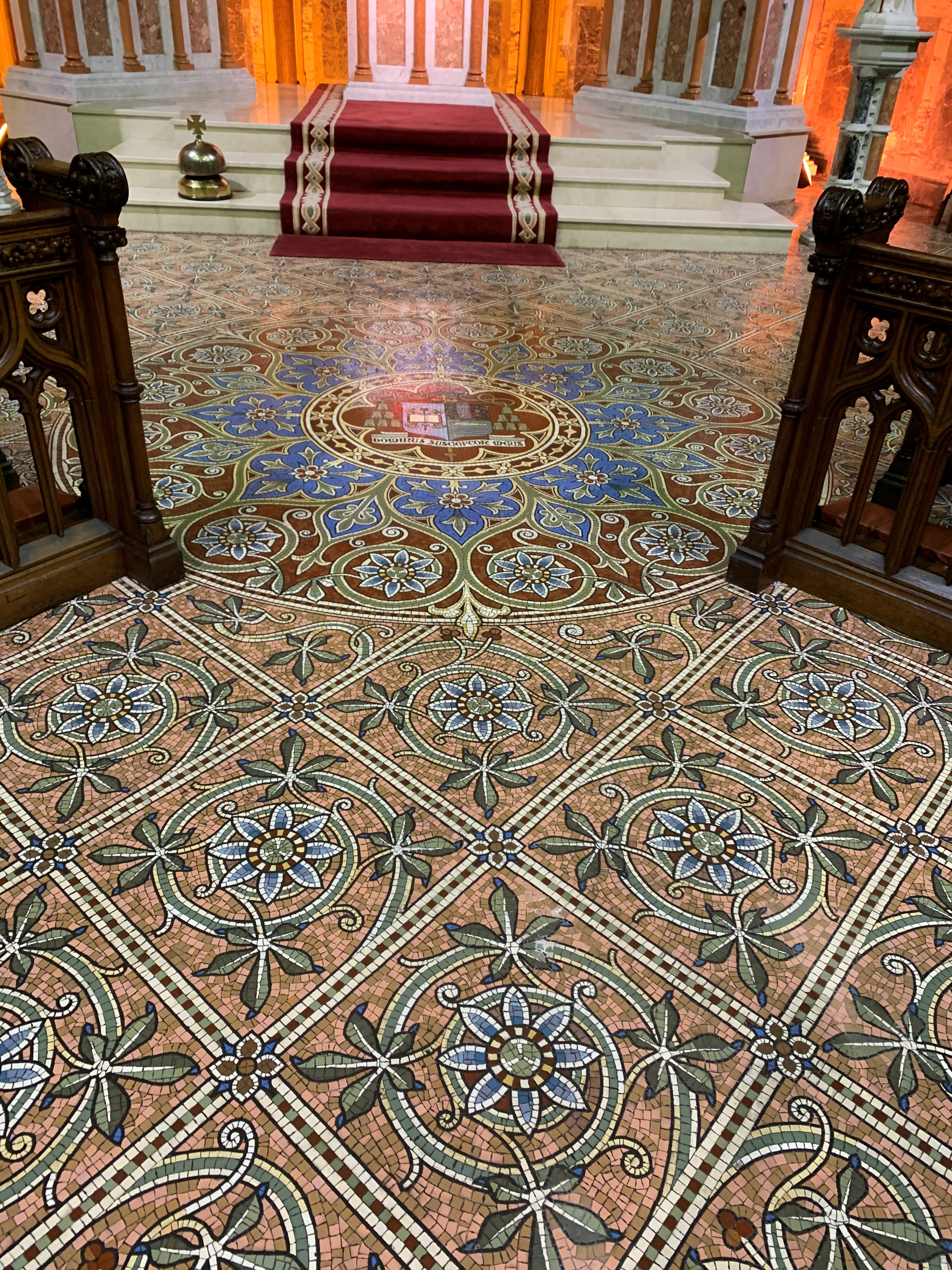
Newry Cathedral sanctuary floor mosaic

The mosaic work was carried out by Oppenheimer of Manchester. The Cathedral contains the largest quantity of gold leafed mosaic in Ireland. The sections of mosaic were put together in a workshop and were glued, face downwards, on strips of parchment. These were applied to the walls in a similar manner to hanging wallpaper.

A new tubular triple manual organ was built by Telford and Telford in Dublin. A new heating system, seating and other general church furnishings were added during this time.

Two years after the completion of this work Dr. O'Neill purchased the spacious grounds to the south of the Cathedral where a mill once stood; which was destroyed in a 1910 fire which threatened the Cathedral.

=== Cathedral Dignity 1919 - Solemn Consecration 1925 ===
The great sums collected by Dr. O'Neill did not liquidate the cost of the reconstruction work. Though £30,000 had been raised, a heavy debt still remained. This debt was cleared in 1918 by the Most Reverend Edward Mulhern two years after his appointment to the See of Dromore. Though usually designated as a Cathedral, the premier Church of the Diocese ranked canonically only as a pro-cathedral, with Saint Patrick as its only Titular.

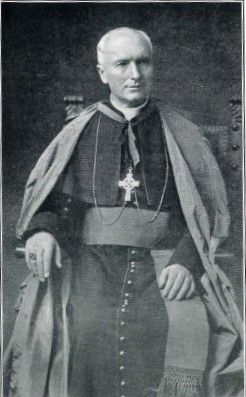
Most Reverend Edward Mulhern, Lord Bishop of Dromore

At the instance of Bishop Edward Mulhern, the Holy See, by a decree of the Sacred Congregation of Rites, dated 7 March 1919, raised the present church to the rank and dignity of a Cathedral. By the same decree the name of St. Colman, Patron of the Diocese, was added to that of St. Patrick as joint Titular aeque principalis.

The Cathedral of SS Patrick & Colman is one of the few churches in Ireland to be privileged with Solemn Consecration. With all debts cleared and the purchase of ground rents secured, Bishop Mulhern solemnly consecrated the building on Tuesday, 21 July 1925 - just one hundred years after the laying of its foundation stone. On the following Sunday impressive centenary ceremonies amid great jubilation marked the solemn occasion. At this function the Most Reverend Dr. Mulhern presided and over twenty Archbishops and Bishops were present including the Primate, Most Rev. Dr. O'Donnell, several Irish Bishops and also a number of foreign Bishops representative of five continents. The streets of Newry were tastefully bedecked with shrines, arches, bunting and papal flags for the occasion.

== Features ==
=== The High Altar and cathedral sanctuary ===
Set in the cathedral sanctuary, the High Altar is the largest shrine, measuring 25 feet in height from the base to the apex cross. It is in gothic style with reredos gracefully turreted, it is mainly of Sicilian, Carrara and Statuary marble, relived by columns in Sienna and Verde Alpi with small panels in Porta Santa and onyx stone from Mexico. The Tabernacle is enclosed by a handsomely - wrought golden doors beset with coloured jewels. In the reredos two fine marble panels are shown - a sculpture of the Nativity, and on the Gospel side and on the Epistle side a sculpture of Christ commissioning the Apostles. On either side of the altar is a marble seraph bearing a torch. On either side of the tabernacle is as adoring angel, presented by Bishop Mulhern. Originally one piece it is now separated into three sections following the reordering of the Sanctuary to reflect the changes of the Second Vatican Council. The Altar is decorated with candlesticks bearing enamel figures of the saints; a crucifix to match rests on a marble throne above the tabernacle and bears an ivory figure of Christ Crucified.

The High Altar was erected in 1894 in memory of Bishop Pius Leahy. It originally stood in the space where the current main altar occupies. The work was carried out by Messers Harrison and sons, Great Brunswick Street Dublin to a cost estimated to be £3,700. Charles Lloyd Harrison of that same company made the Pulpit depicting the sermon of the mount on the front panel. Formally the last supper depicted in Carrara marble occupied its place beneath the altar table. Presently it adorns the front of the new altar. Within the Main Altar are the relics of SS. Oliver Plunket, Malachy, Felicissimus, Virginia and Columbanus.

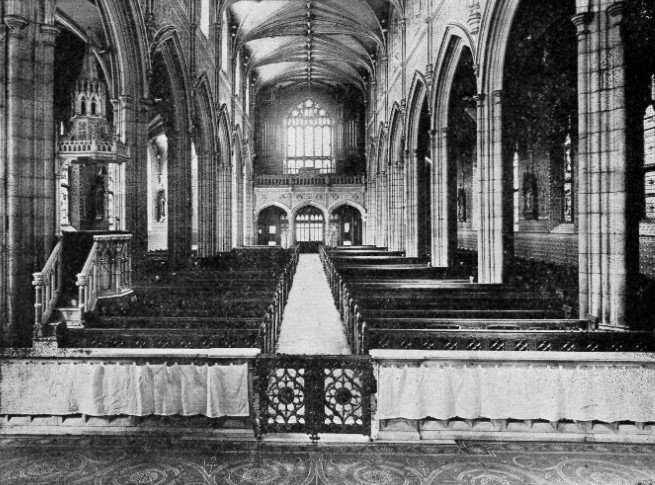
The Interior from the Sanctuary, Showing Organ and Choir Gallery - 1910

In the main sanctuary, the lower portion of the Sanctuary walls are panelled in marbles - Levanto Red, Porta Santa and Paonazzo - while the upper walls are finished in gold and colored mosaics exhibiting a variety of emblematic symbols and a number of angelic figures. The main sanctuary is separated by carved Carrara marble Screens its two side chapels of the Blessed Virgin and St. Joseph. The large cluster of columns are of polished stone in Newry grey and Balmoral Red that were imported from Finland. The floral mosaic sanctuary floor, carries in the centre in front of the High Altar the Coat of Arms of Bishop O'Neill. Overhead hangs the sanctuary lamp made of Sterling Silver, a present from Mr. & Mrs. John J. McArevey.

The clerestory walls in the sanctuary contain a vast quantity of gold and Blue Venetian mosaic work which depicts the objects associated with Christ's Crucifixion. (Cross, chalice, scourging etc.).

The Stained glass windows in the sanctuary which depict the life of Christ, the life of his Apostles & various saints and Missionaries. These windows differ from the German windows found in the rest of the Cathedral as they were made by Hardman a Birmingham company between 1908-1914. Only the centre panel was complete for the opening of the new Sanctuary. It is interesting to note the depiction of St. Therese of Lisieux portrayed without a halo as at the time of the windows' installation she was not yet beatified.

=== Sacred Heart Shrine ===
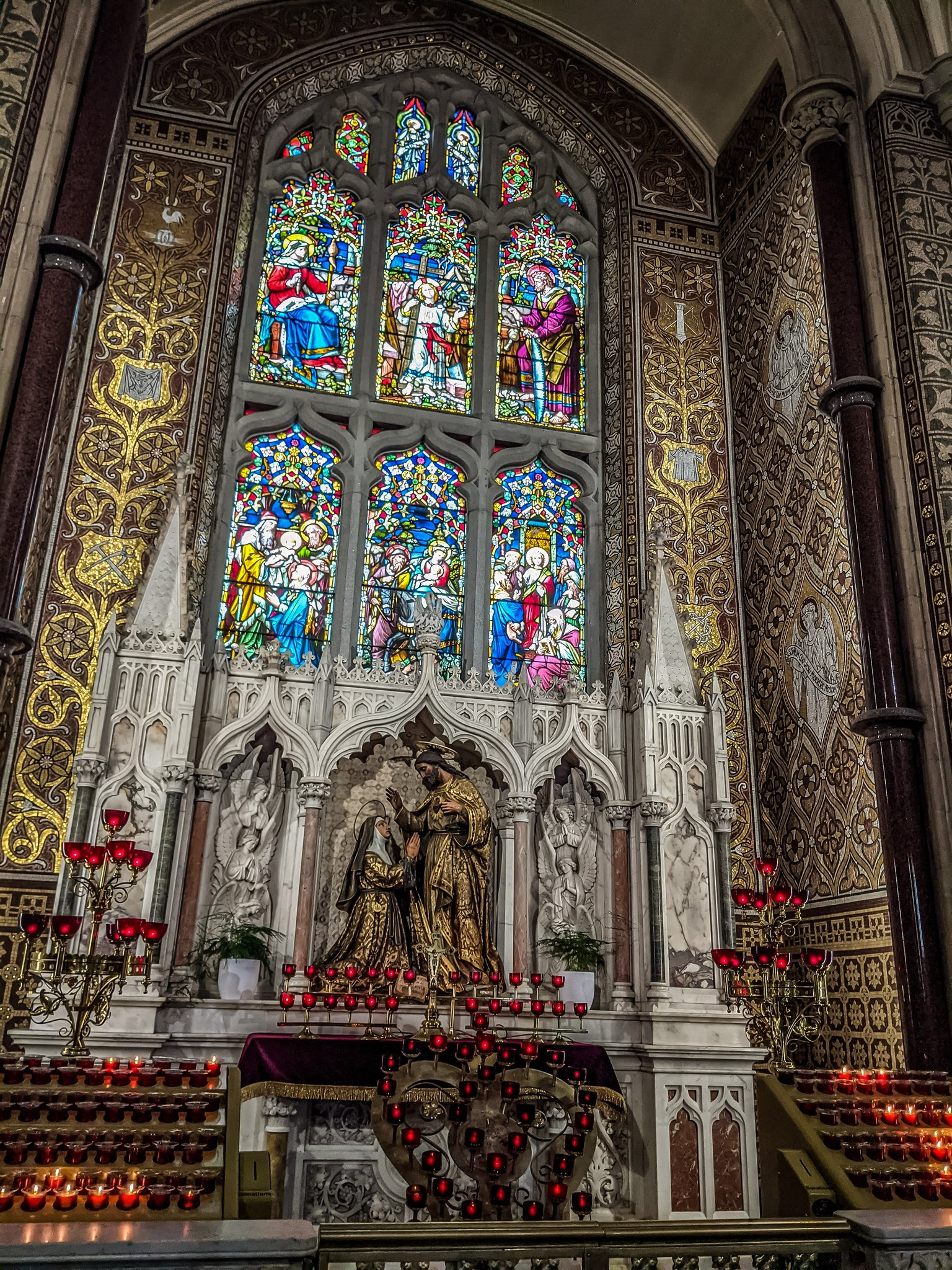
Sacred Heart Shrine

This shrine is enclosed by marble altar rails. It was erected by the Sacred Heart Confraternity in memory of Fr. James Carlin who was its Spiritual Director. Over the altar is a gilded shrine portraying Christ revealing the sorrows of his Sacred Heart to Saint Margaret Mary.

The altar is in Carrara marble with the reredos being Rosso Corallo with additions of Verde Serpentino and Sienna marble. Over the altar is a gilded shrine portraying Christ revealing the sorrows of His Sacred Heart to St. Margaret Mary. on either side of the reredos is a small panel depicting seraphim.

Above the altar the stain glass window, which was formerly in the centre of the sanctuary over the former High Altar was first erected in 1880 by the Holy Family Confraternity in memory of Fr. Pacificus C.P. the founder of the Confraternity. the window shows scenes on the life of the Holy Family, Our Lady, Jesus and Joseph at work. In the lower lights the Presentation in the Temple, Flight into Egypt and the Finding of Jesus in the Temple

On Tuesday 14 April 1925 at 10.00am Bishop Edward Mulhern Consecrated the Sacred Heart Shrine which was built into a niche in the North Transept. It was the third altar to be consecrated in the Cathedral in preparation for the Consecration of the Cathedral itself in the summer of 1925. Fr Carlin in conjunction with the then Bishop of Dromore Dr. O'Neill planned the improvement scheme that has made the Cathedral one of the finest in Catholic Ireland. As part of the ceremony the Relics of Saints Prosper and Cyparius (which were brought by Bishop Mulhern from Rome) were brought in procession from the Lady Chapel Altar while the Office of Matins and Lauds from the Office of Martyrs was recited.

=== Lady Chapel ===
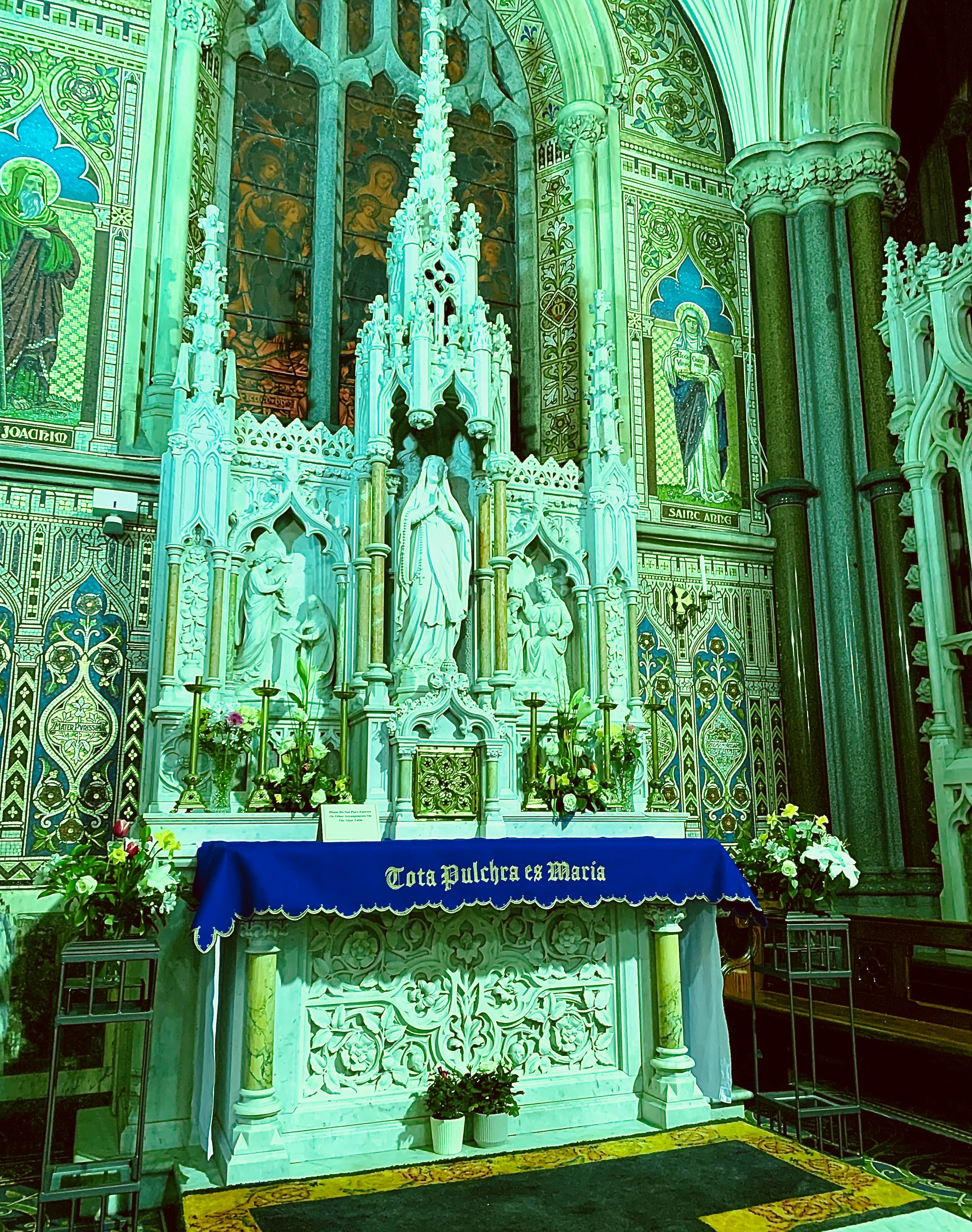
Lady Chapel

The Chapel of the Blessed Virgin is located to the left of the main Sanctuary displays the same ornate decoration in marbles and mosaics. A number of invocations from the Litany of the Blessed Virgin Mary, all worked in mosaics with accompanying symbols mainly in gold, are seen on the wall around the altar. The altar itself, in Carrara marble generally, carries columns in Sienna and Rosso Corallo, with small panels in Levanto Red. The tabernacle door has a gold finish and above stands a marble statue Our Lady of Lourdes. The two small panels in the marble reredos present the Annunciation and the Coronation of the Virgin. The stained glass window over the altar shows The Virgin Mary with the Child Jesus. The Virgin's parents, St. Joachim and St. Anne are shown in mosaics on either side. The sanctuary lamp in this chapel was presented by the Children on Mary Sodality, on the occasion of the Consecration in 1925. To the Left of the altar is a stained glass window showing Christ blessing the Little Children. The ceremonial processional entrance to the sacristy in located in the Lady Chapel.

=== Saint Joseph's Chapel ===
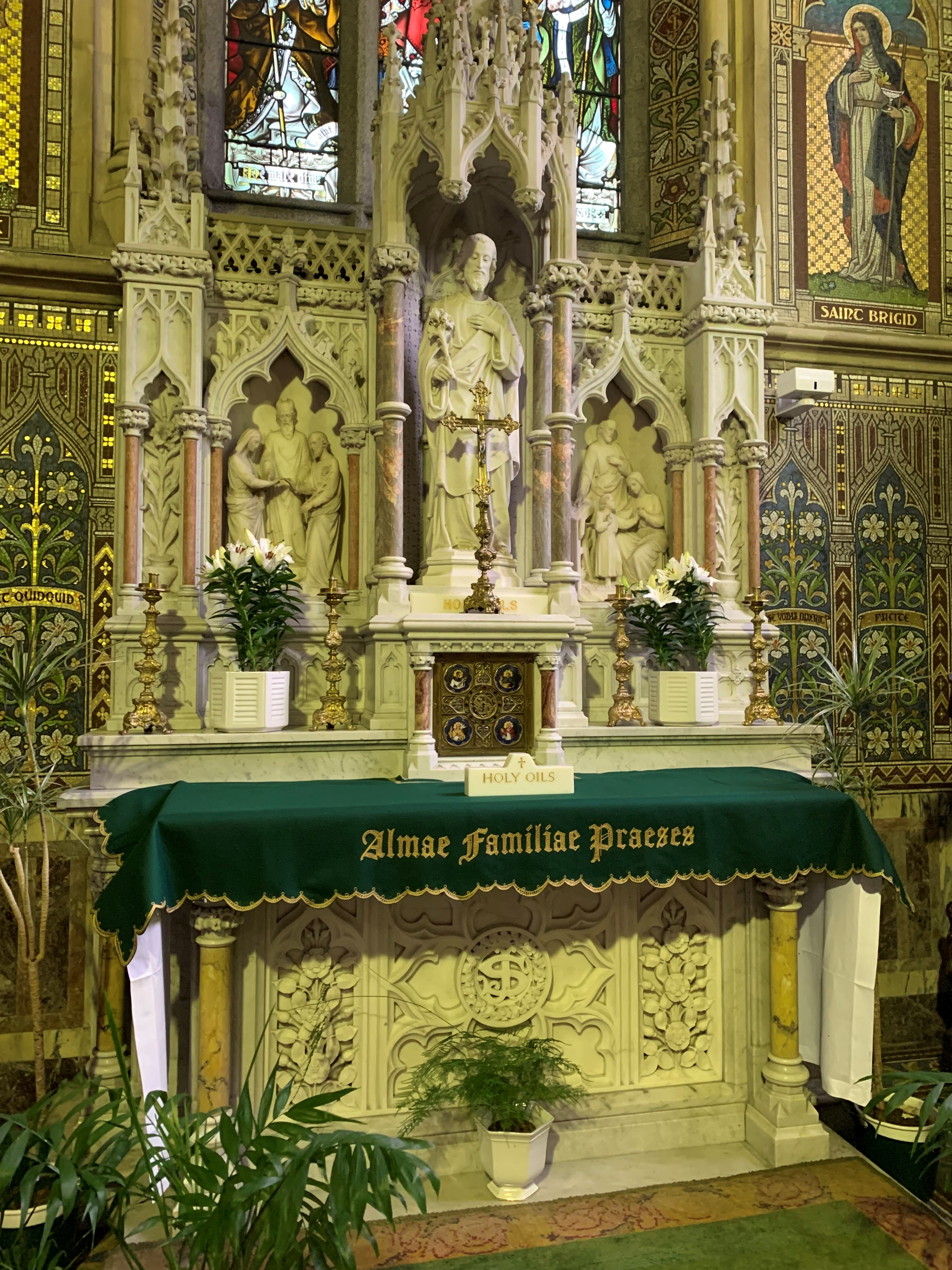
St Joseph's Altar

Saint Joseph's Chapel to the right of the main sanctuary shows a similar artistic finish in mosaics and marbles to the Lady Chapel. The altar is mainly in Carrara marble relieved by columns in Sienna and Porta Santa. A gilt door, centred by red onyx columns encloses the tabernacle over which stands a marble statue of St. Joseph. In the Marble reredos to the left, is a panel showing the espousal of St. Joseph to the Virgin Mary, and on the right a similar panel depicting the Holy Family in their Nazareth workshop. The Sanctuary wall carries a number of invocations to St. Joseph set in gold mosaics. The stained glass window over the altar shows the figures of St. Joseph and the infant Jesus in the centre panel. St. Patrick and St. Brigid in mosaics appear to the left and the right respectively. The altar in this chapel was the gift of the Holy Family Confraternity in 1908, because of this the Chapel is commonly referred to as the 'Holy Family Chapel'. The sanctuary lamp in front of the altar was presented Mr. James Fleming, Newry, in 1925.

=== Cathedral Reliquary ===
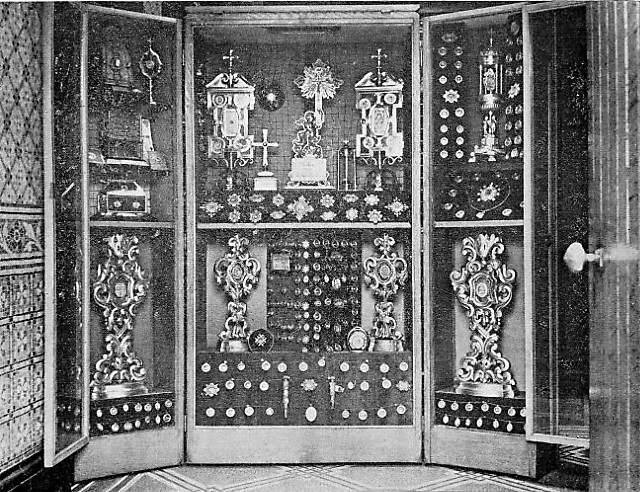
The Cathedral Reliquary - pictured in 1925 when first presented by Bishop Edward Mulhern

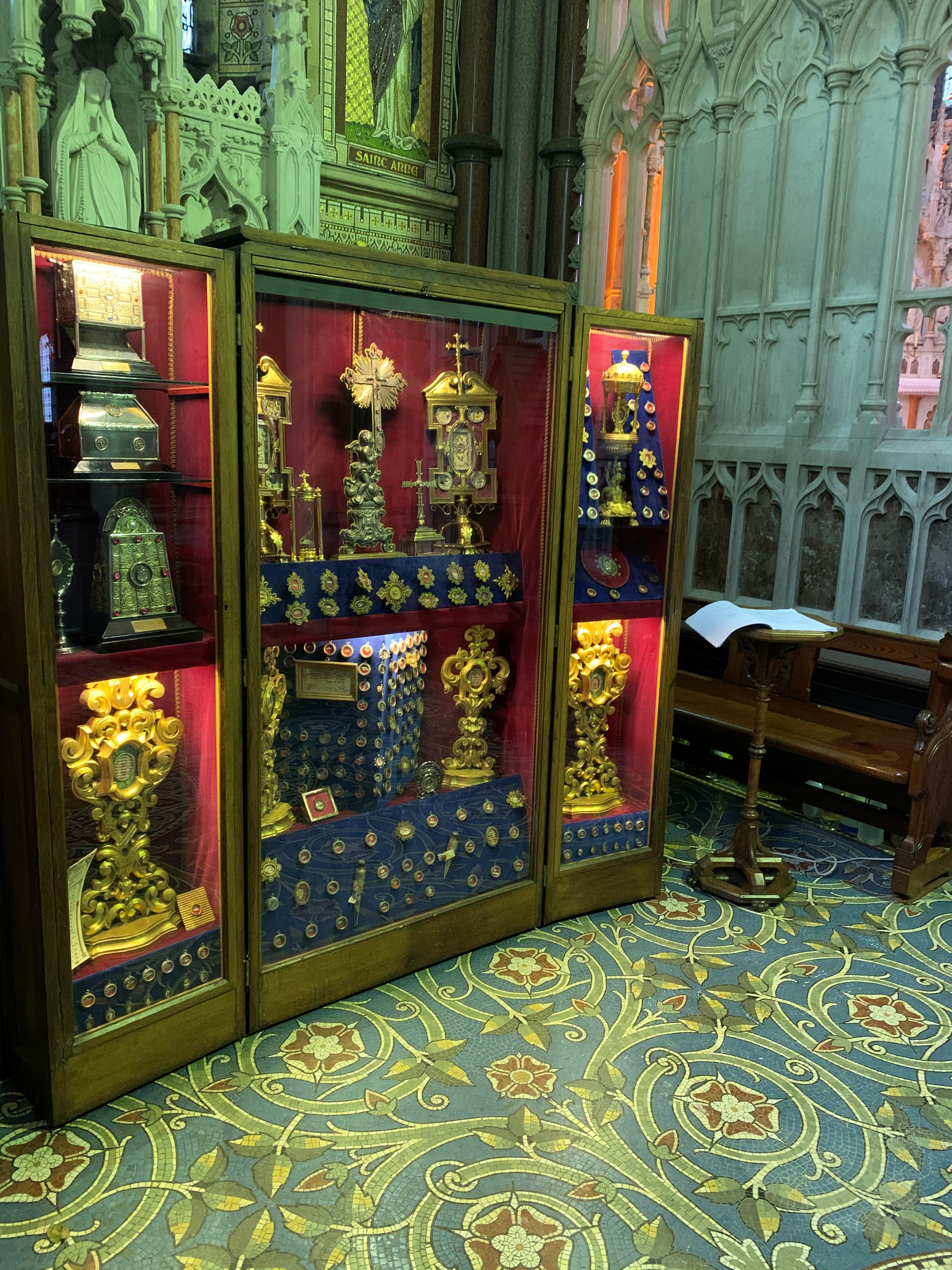
The reliquary out for veneration in the Lady Chapel in 2020

The Cathedral Reliquary contains over 300 Relics of the Saints. It was described in "The Christian Family Magazine" as "Irelands Most Precious Reliquary". This shrine is exposed for veneration each year during the octave of the Feast of All Saints. In this collection may be seen a relic of the True Cross, a piece of the Veil of the Most Blessed Virgin Mary, pieces from the instruments of Christ's Passion (Arma Christi) two sets of relics belonging to the Apostles and relics of several Irish Saints including St. Patrick, St. Brigid, St. Columkille, St. Columbanus, St. Virgilius, St. Gall, St. Laurence O'Toole, St. Oliver Plunket. Many other Saints of the Catholic Church are also included - Popes, Confessors, Martyrs, Pontiffs, Doctors and Holy Women. Some of these are shown in artistic mountings, others are enclosed in wrought cases or miniature replicas of famous historic shrines. All were collected by Bishop Mulhern who arranged the setting and layout of the reliquary. The folding oak casement of the shrine was designed and executed by Mr J.H. McAteer, Newry. Together with all the relics enclosed, it was presented to the Cathedral in 1925 by Bishop Mulhern on the occasion of its Consecration.

Relics worthy of mention included in the Cathedrals collection:

- The True Cross of Christ
- Veil of the Blessed Virgin Mary
- St Joseph (House)
- Manger of Christ
- The Apostles & Evangelists
- St John the Baptist
- Column of Flagellation
- Stone from the Holy Sepulchre
- Stone from the Room of the Last Supper
- Stone from the Holy House of Loretto
- St Patrick
- St Brigid of Ireland
- SS Francis & Clare
- St Anthony of Padua
- St Columbanus
- St Oliver Plunkett
- The Rib of St Rupert
- Autograph of St. Alphonsus Ligori
- St Carlo Acutis

=== Cathedral sacristy ===
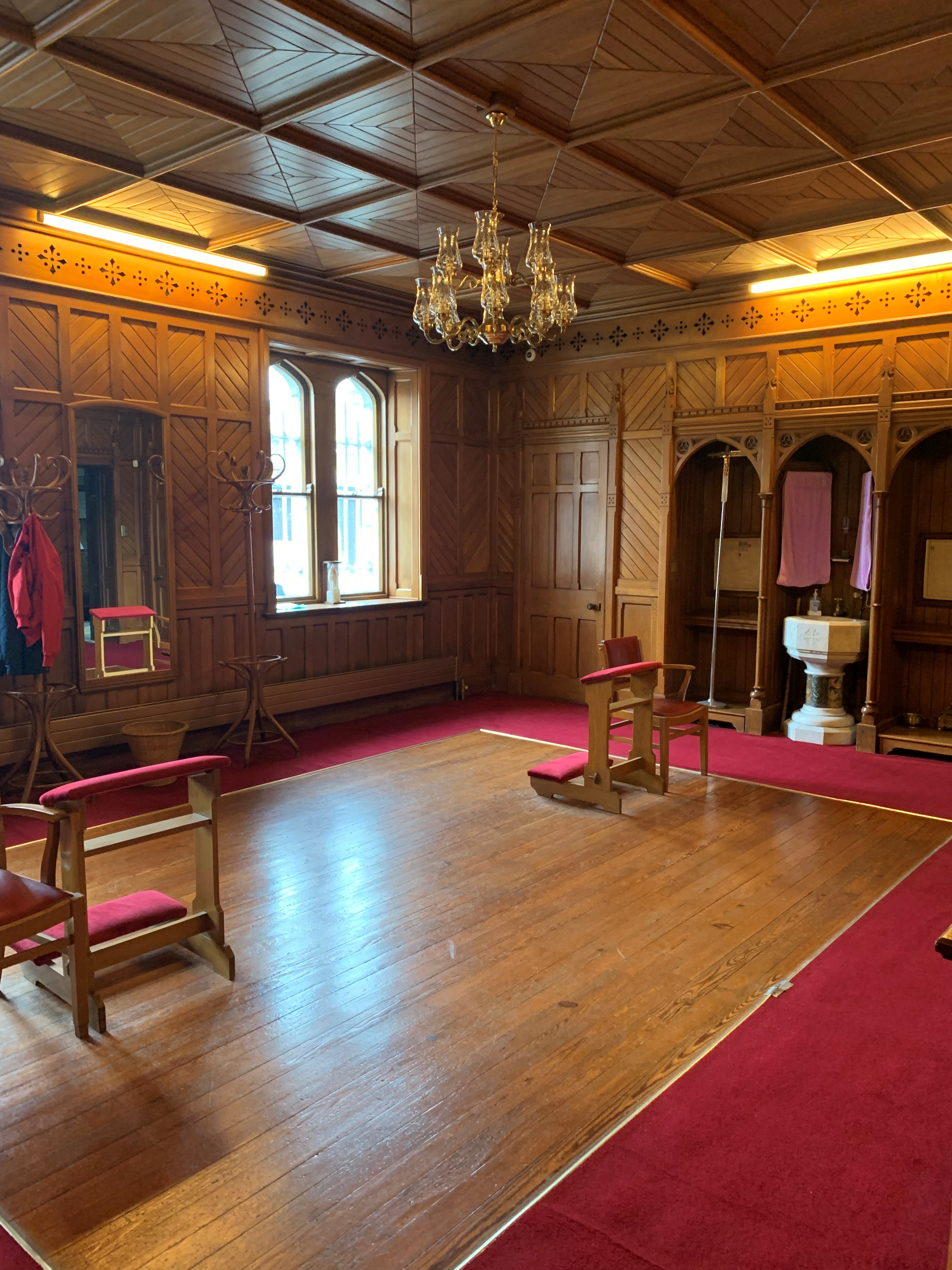
Canons Sacristy

The Cathedral is graced with three Sacristies. The "Boy's Sacristy" for the use of the Cathedral Altar Servers, the Upper Sacristy (originally known as the "Confraternity Sacristy") for the use of the two Confraternities that were formerly attached to the Cathedral and the most ornate of the three is the Main Sacristy known as the "Canon's Sacristy". The approach to the Sacristy is through a massive oak-framed and sheeted door. In the Sacristy vestibule on the left-hand side are doors, one leading to stairs by which the confraternity sacristy is reached, and the other to the Main Sacristy. The Sacristy building is separated from the cathedral building by the processional corridor. The Main (Canon's) Sacristy ceiling and walls are wainscoted in framed, panelled and moulded Austrian oak, with sunk recesses for presses, marble lavabo Sacrarium Sink, prie-dieu's for prayers before & after mass and vesting presses. Often referred to as one of the finest pieces of joinery in the country. Through a doorway at the end of the passage the Lady Chapel is reached.

On Sunday 18 January 1959 at 3.00am the Canon's sacristy suffered a devastating fire when the heating chamber below caused the wooden floor joists to combust. The Ceiling was destroyed entirely along with the outer wall section, the gothic chandelier and the fireplace. The upper sacristy at the time was used to store hundreds of candles which fed the flames, as the heat melted the wax it fed the flames in the main sacristy below. The fire service arrived to extinguish the blaze; water was needed from the canal to assist in reducing the flames. As a result the marble was permanently dulled from the oils in the canal water. The priests joined the neighbours that lived in the vicinity, the Cathedral Sacristan and the firemen in tackling the blaze; and due to the structural layout that separates the sacristy building from the church were successful in restricting the damage to the Sacristy building.

Mass was celebrated as normal that day. A temporary sacristy was erected at the Lady Chapel with vestments borrowed from the Diocesan College and the local Convents.

Felix O'Hare was appointed to restore the two sacristies. Glass was used to clean the surviving wood and was thereafter waxed. The fire left a lasting change on the patina of the wood resulting in the sacristy to appear as a golden oak colour rather than the original darker finish; the difference can still be seen between the inner and outer sides of the door frames. The latter retains the darker finish. The fireplace was also replaced with a large mirror. The Cathedral retains a Solemn High Mass Set in Cloth of Gold that still retain the smell of smoke from the fire.

== Cathedral organ ==
The present organ is located above the vestibule at the Great West Door. it was built by Messrs. Telford & Telford of Dublin in 1910. This tubular, pneumatic, triple-manual organ was the gift of the people of the Diocese following the completion of the Cathedral in 1909. Half the cost, however, was obtained by the Carnegie grants by Canon O'Hare, P.P., Banbridge, during his U.S.A. campaign for funds towards the Cathedral. Originally the organ was arranged along the back of the choir gallery, but shortly after the arrival of Mons. Jozef Delafaille, L.L.I., as organist in 1929, the organ was re-built and electrified: the pipes were redistributed on either side, thus leaving more space in the gallery and at the same time brightening up the rear of the church by making visible from the interior the large window in the Cathedral façade. Due to this there is an extensive amount of mosaic on the walls in the organ gallery that is now hidden behind the organ.

=== Specification ===
Positive: Trumpetta Real 8, Krummhorn 8, Cymbel RKS 29.33.36, Larigot 1 1/3, Gemshorn 2, Koppel Flute 4, Stopped Diapason 8, Swell to Positive, Positive to Pedal.

Great: Trumpet 8, Sharp Mixture RKS 26.29.33, Full Mixture RKS 15.19.22.26, Sesqui Altera RKS 17.19, Fifteenth 2, Spitz Flute 4, Octave 4, Stopped Diapason 8, Principal 8, Bourdon 16, Swell to Great, Positive to Great, Great to Pedal, SW. & PED Pistons Coupled, GT. & PED Pistons Coupled.

Swell: Swell Octave, Clarion 4, Oboe 8, Trumpet 8, Contra Posaune 16, Mixture RKS 22.26.29, Tierce 1 3/3, Block Flute 2, Nazard 2 2/3, Flute 4, Principal 4, Gedackt 8, Dulciana 8, Swell to Pedal.

Pedal: Dulzian 4, Trumpet 8, Bombard 16, Mixture RKS 22.26.29.33, Octave Flute 4, Fifteenth 4, Bass Flute 8, Octave 8, Bourdon 16, Principal 16.

== Anniversaries of significance to the Diocese ==
- 17 March - Solemnity of Saint Patrick, Patronal Feast of the Cathedral
- 7 June - Solemnity of Saint Colman, Patronal Feast of both the Diocese and the Cathedral
- 21 July - Anniversary of the Consecration of the Cathedral
- In 2029 the Cathedral will celebrate its bicentenary

== Cathedral clergy ==
As of September 2022, Newry Cathedral is served by the following clergy:

- Parish priest – Apostolic Administrator of Dromore, Most Reverend Eamon Martin
- Administrator – Canon Francis Brown
- Curates – Fr Alphonsus Chukwunenye msp., Fr Wojciech Stachyra SChr., Fr Carlos Esteban Rojo
- Deacon – Rev. Francesco Campiello

== Gallery ==
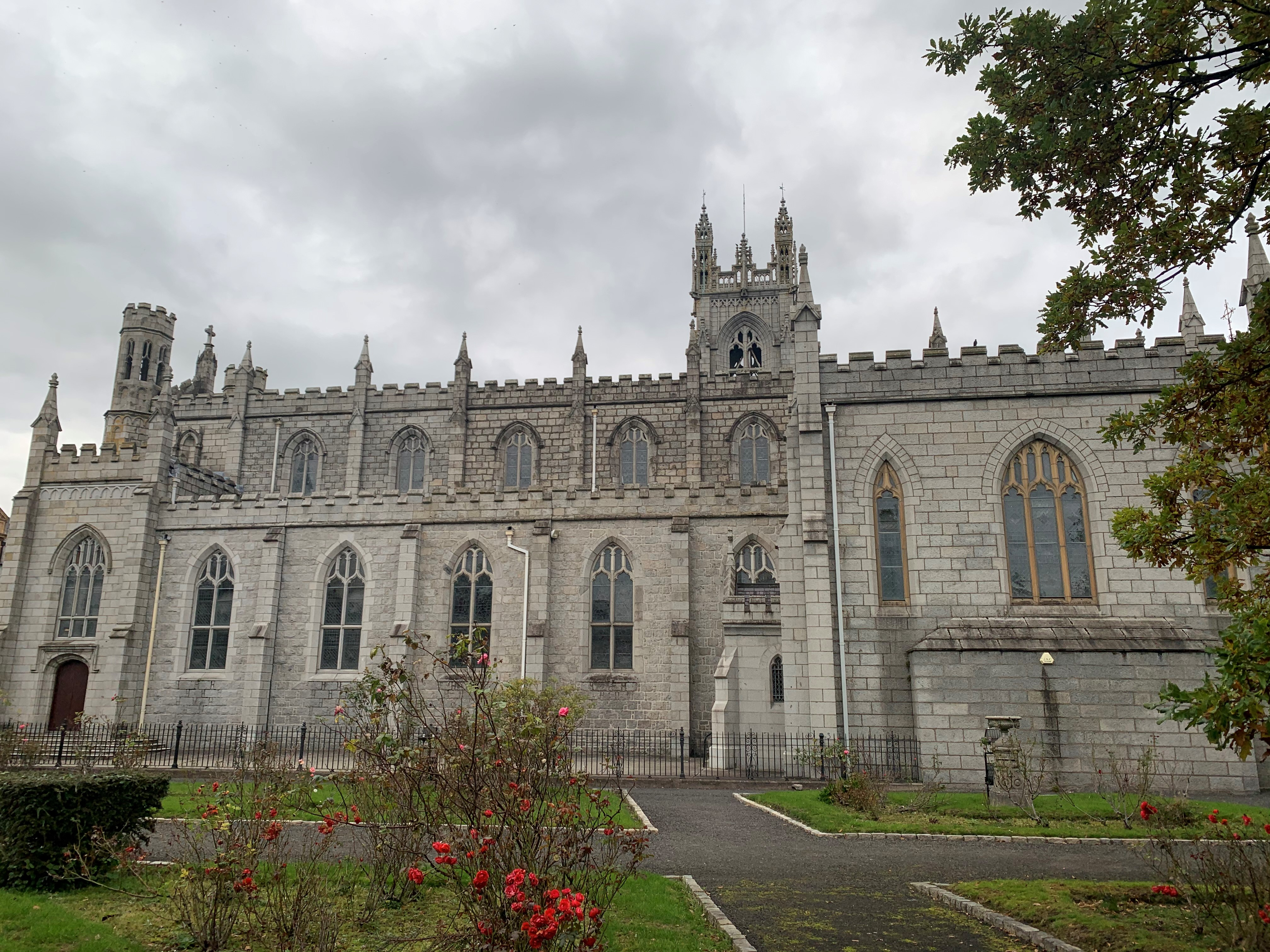
Newry Cathedral from the Cathedral Garden

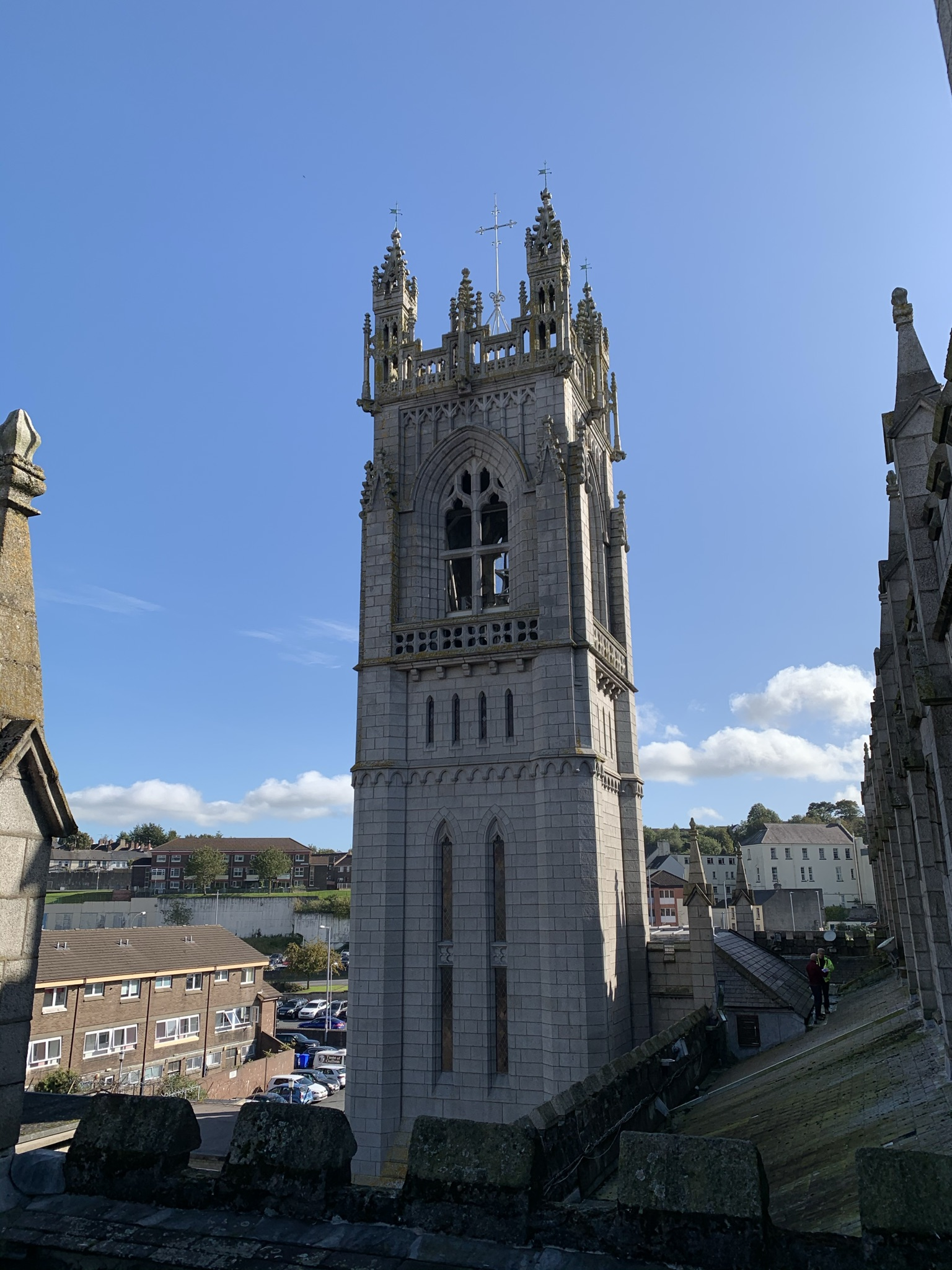
Tower

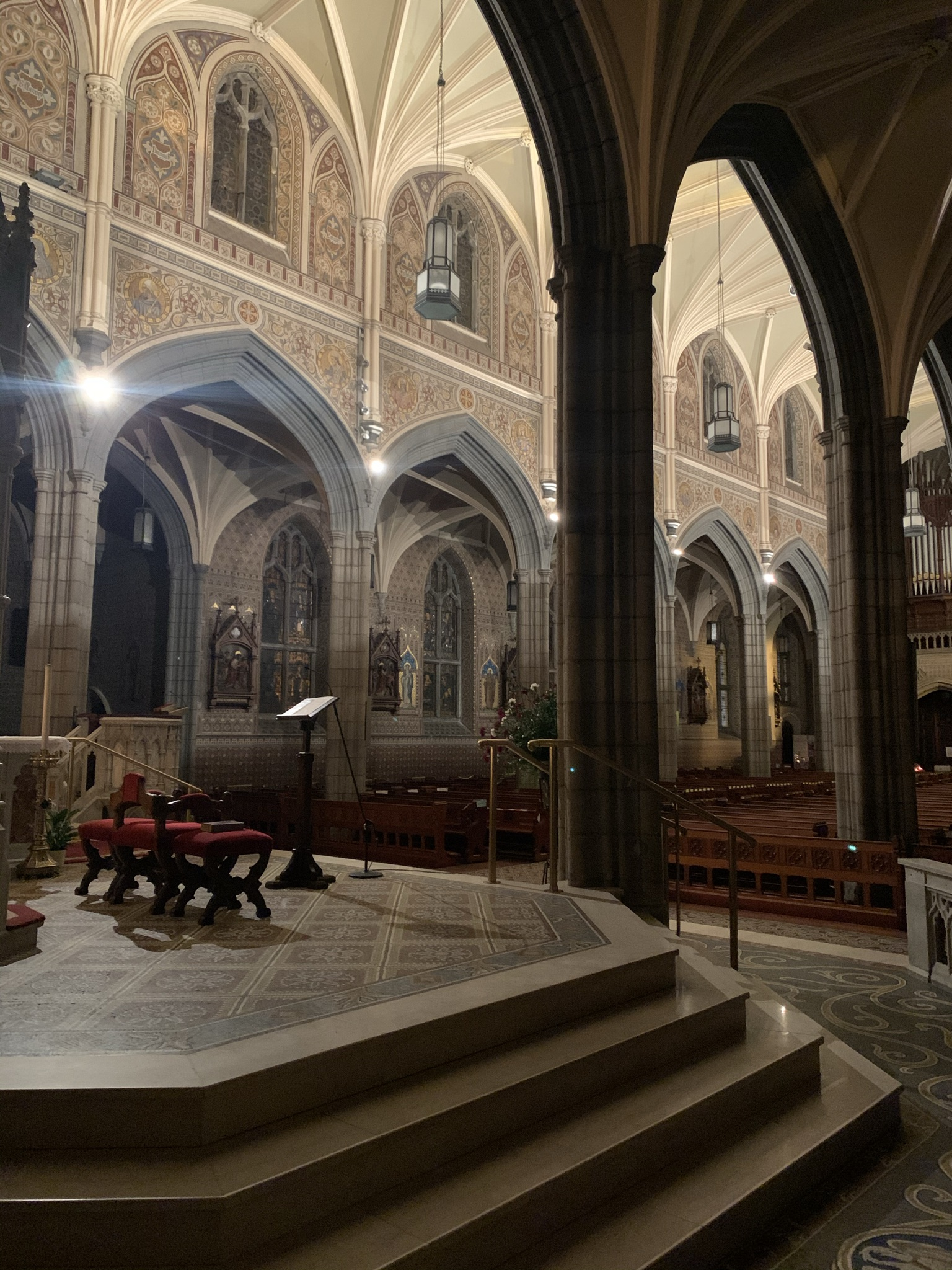
Nave

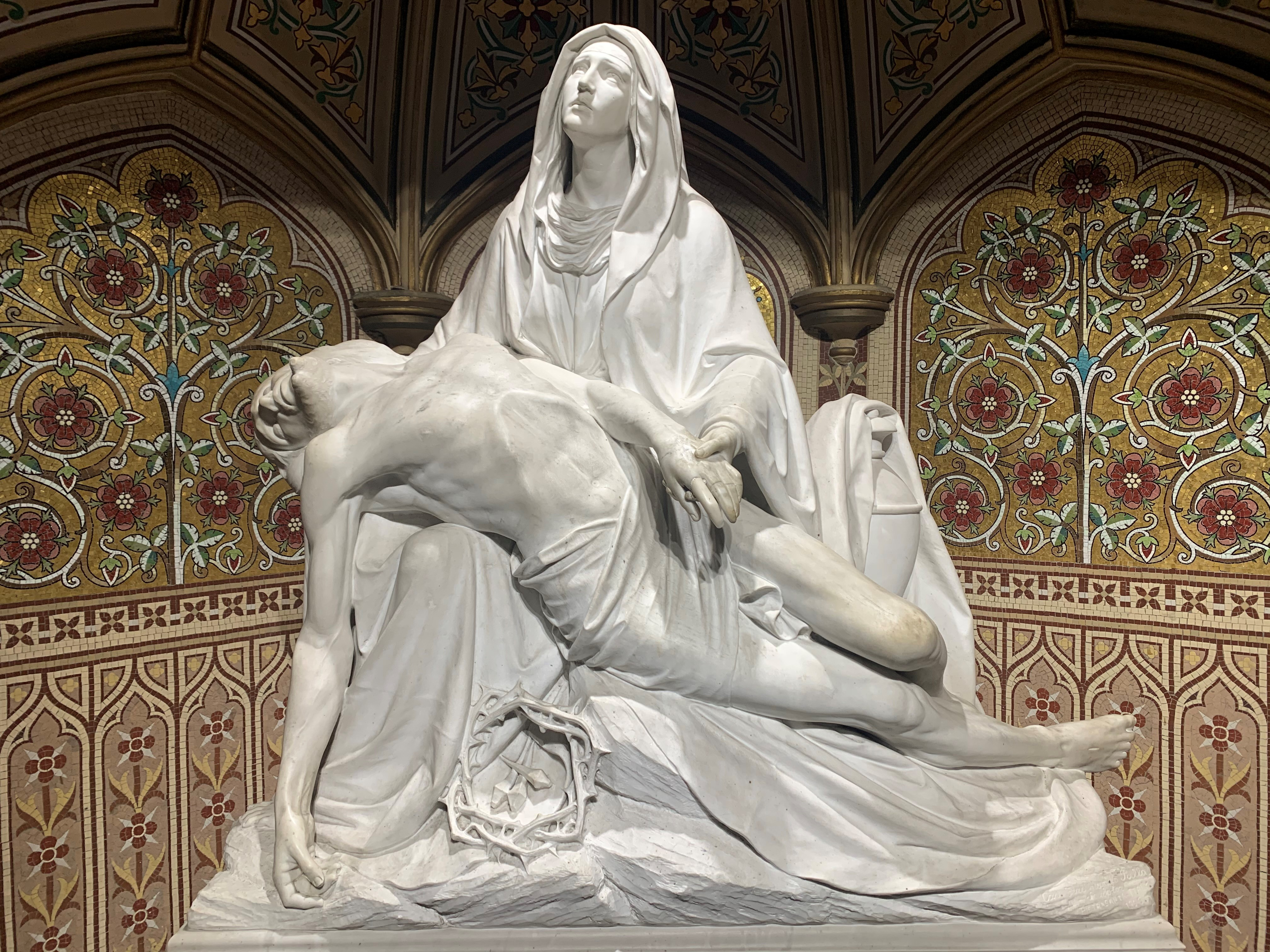
Newry Cathedral Pieta

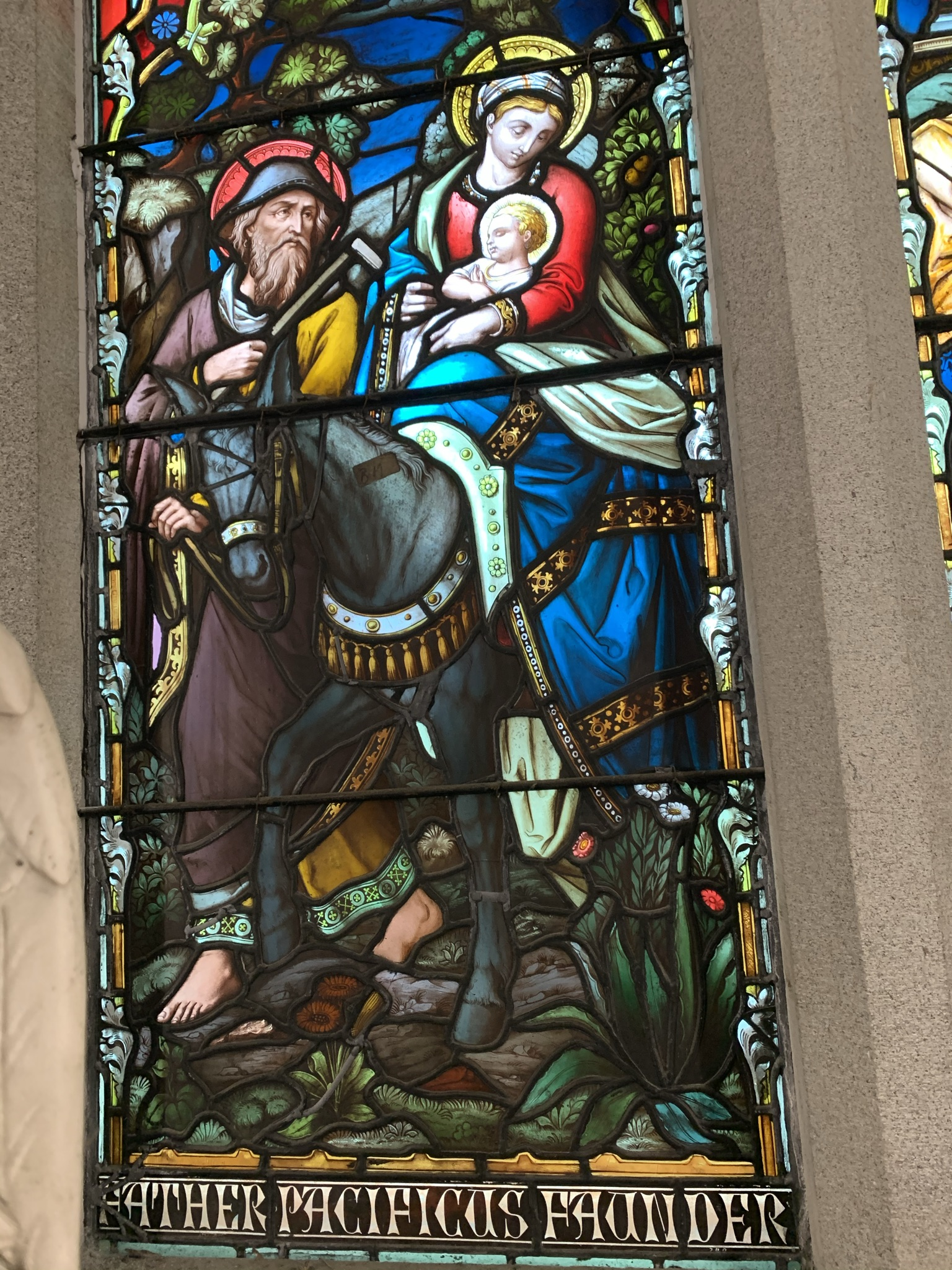
Memorial window

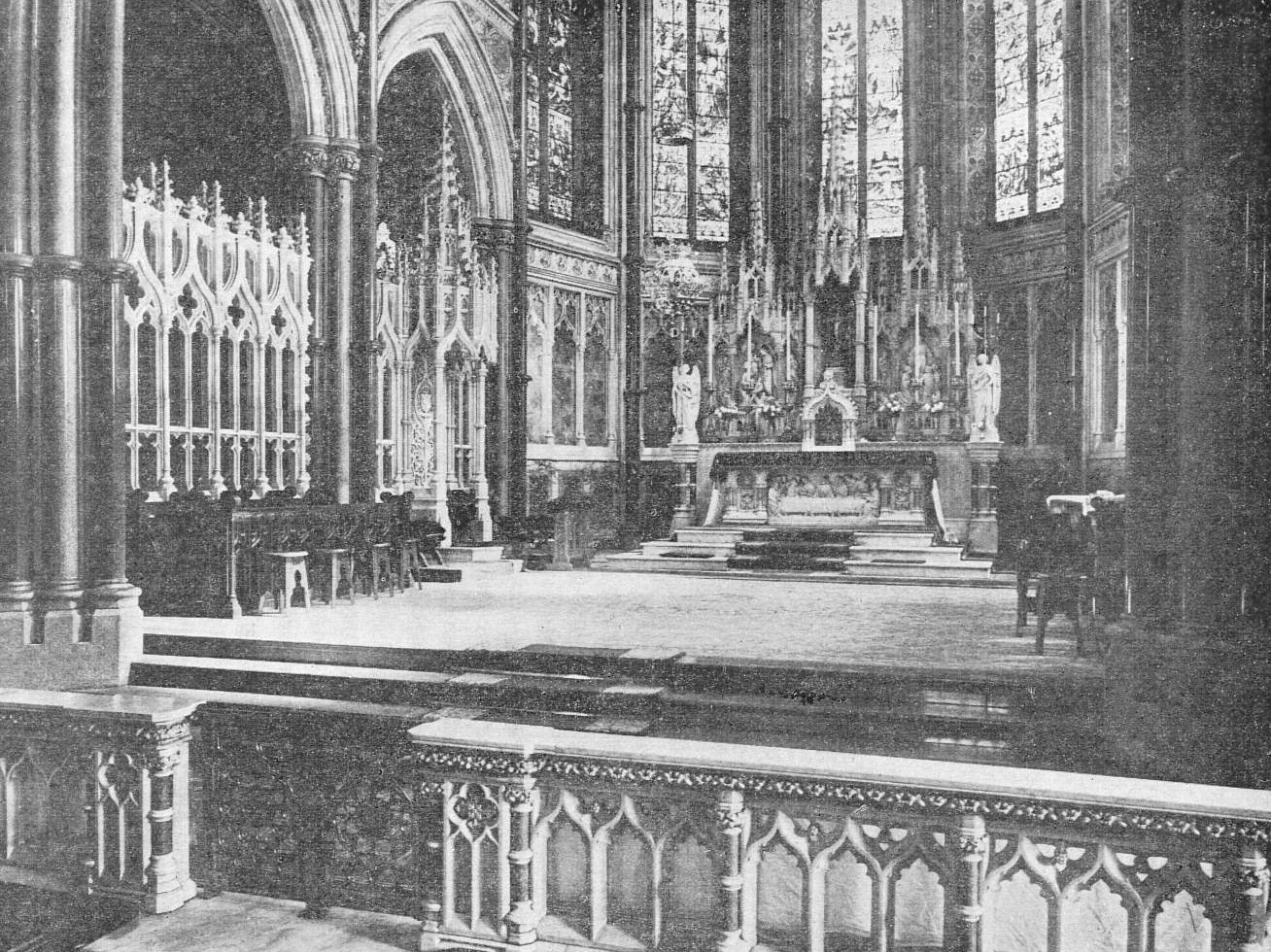
Cathedral Sanctuary before alterations

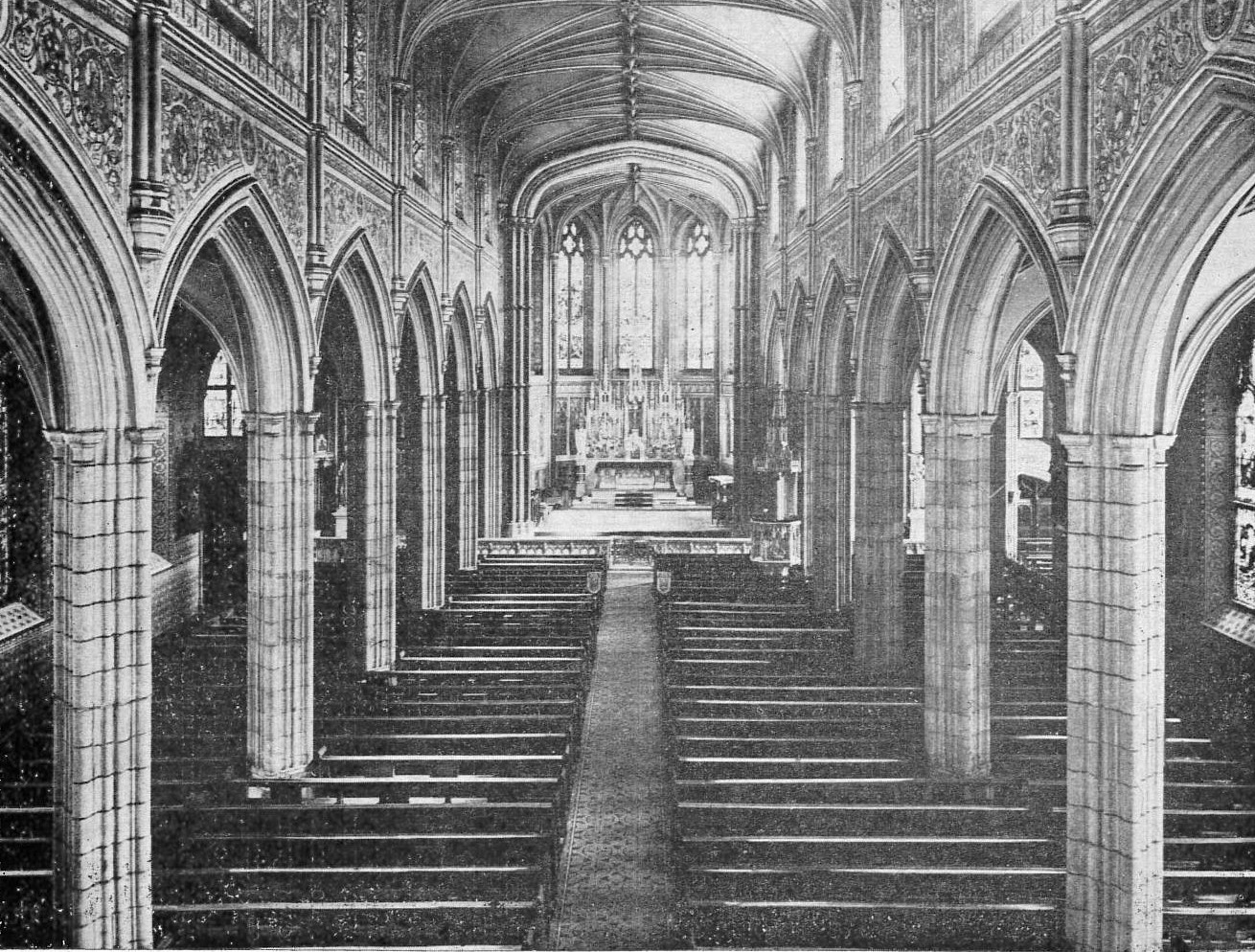
Sanctuary

== See also ==
- List of cathedrals in Ireland
