= Robert Leslie (bishop) =

Irish Anglican bishop

Styles of Robert Leslie
- Reference style: The Right Reverend
- Spoken style: My Lord
- Religious style: Bishop

Robert Leslie (died 10 August 1672) was an Anglican prelate who served in the Church of Ireland as the Bishop of Dromore (1660–61), then Bishop of Raphoe (1661–71), and finally Bishop of Clogher (1671–72).

He was the son of Dr Henry Leslie, Bishop of Down and Connor. Robert was educated in Dublin and took a Master of Arts degree at Aberdeen. In 1638, his first ecclesiastical appointment was as a canon of St Saviour's Cathedral in Connor, County Antrim. Three years later, the cathedral was destroyed during the Irish Rebellion of 1641. After the Restoration of the monarchy, he was nominated Bishop of Dromore on 6 August 1660 and consecrated on 27 January 1661. He was also granted in commendam the archdeaconry of Connor by letters patent on 10 August 1660.

He was translated twice, firstly to the bishopric of Raphoe on 20 June 1661, and secondly to the bishopric of Clogher on 26 October 1671. After becoming bishop of Clogher, he resigned the archdeaconry of Connor.

He died in office at Ballygawley, County Tyrone on 10 August 1672, and was interred in St Macartan's Cathedral, Clogher.

Church of Ireland titles
Preceded by Theophilus Buckworth	Bishop of Dromore; 1660–1661	Succeeded by Jeremy Taylor (administrator)
Preceded by John Leslie	Bishop of Raphoe; 1661–1671	Succeeded by Ezekiel Hopkins
Preceded by John Leslie	Bishop of Clogher; 1671–1672	Succeeded by Roger Boyle
