= Patrick Curtis =

Patrick Curtis may refer to:

- Patrick Curtis (bishop) (1740–1832), Irish Roman Catholic archbishop
- Patrick Curtis (producer) (1939–2022), American producer and actor
