= Thomas Kelly (archbishop of Armagh) =

Roman Catholic Archbishop of Armagh, Ireland

The Most Reverend Thomas Kelly DD
- Archbishop of Armagh; Primate of All Ireland
- Archdiocese: Armagh
- Installed: 1832
- Term ended: 1835 (died)
- Predecessor: Patrick Curtis (bishop)
- Successor: William Crolly
- Previous post: Bishop of Dromore

Orders
- Ordination: (Priest)
- Consecration: 27 Aug 1826 (Bishop)

Personal details
- Born: 1781 County Down
- Died: 14 January 1835 (aged 53–54) County Armagh
- Denomination: Roman Catholic Church
- Education: Maynooth College

Styles of Thomas Kelly
- Reference style: The Most Reverend
- Spoken style: Your Grace or Archbishop

Thomas Kelly (died 1835) was an Irish prelate of the Roman Catholic Church. He served as Bishop of Dromore from 1826 to 1828 and Archbishop of Armagh from 1828 to 1835.

== Biography ==
Kelly entered Maynooth in 1814 to study for the priesthood, was ordained for the diocese of Armagh in 1820, served as Dean and Professor of Dogmatic Theology in Maynooth. Kelly was elected Bishop of Dromore by the Propaganda Fide on 29 May 1826 and confirmed by Pope Leo XII on 4 June 1826. His episcopal ordination took place on 27 August 1826.

Two years later, he was made coadjutor archbishop of Armagh, with right of succession, on 1 December 1828.

He retained administration of the Diocese of Dromore until Michael Blake was appointed Bishop of Dromore in 1833. On the death of Archbishop Patrick Curtis of Armagh on 26 July 1832, Kelly automatically succeeded as archbishop.

He died in office on 13 January 1835.

== Bibliography ==
- Brady, W. Maziere (1876). The Episcopal Succession in England, Scotland and Ireland, A.D. 1400 to 1875. Rome. Volume 1: Tipografia Della Pace.
- Fryde, E. B.; Greenway, D. E.; Porter, S.; Roy, I., eds. (1986). Handbook of British Chronology (3rd, reprinted 2003 ed.). Cambridge: Cambridge University Press. ISBN 0-521-56350-X.

Catholic Church titles
Preceded by Hugh O'Kelly	Bishop of Dromore; 1826–1828	Succeeded by Michael Blake
Preceded by Patrick Curtis	Archbishop of Armagh and Primate of All Ireland; 1832–1835	Succeeded by William Crolly
