= Francis Brooks =

Francis Brooks may refer to:

- Francis Gerard Brooks (1924–2010), Roman Catholic bishop in Northern Ireland
- Francis K. Brooks (born 1943), Vermont educator and politician
