= Leo Murphy (Gaelic footballer) =

Gaelic footballer from Northern Ireland

Personal information
- Native name: Leon Ó Murchú (Irish)
- Born: 1939 Kilkeel, County Down, Northern Ireland
- Died: 20 February 2017 (aged 78) Rostrevor, County Down, Northern Ireland
- Occupation: Primary school principal

Sport
- Sport: Gaelic football
- Position: Full-back
Clubs
- Years: Club
- Lisnacree; Kilkeel; Rostrevor
Club titles
- Down titles: 0
Inter-county
- Years: County
- 1957-1967: Down
Inter-county titles
- Ulster titles: 6
- All-Irelands: 2
- NFL: 2

Leo Murphy (1939 – 20 February 2017) was a Northern Irish Gaelic footballer. His league and championship career with the Down senior team spanned ten seasons from 1957 to 1967. Murphy was described by the Down County Board as the "finest full back of [his] era".

Born in Kilkeel, County Down, Murphy played competitive Gaelic football as a boarder at St Colman's College in Newry, and won a MacRory Cup medal in 1957. Murphy began his club football career with Lisnacree before playing with Kilkeel and winning a county junior championship medal with the club. He ended his club career with Rostrevor in 1975.

Murphy made his debut on the inter-county scene at the age of sixteen when he was selected for the Down minor team. He played during two championship seasons with the minor team, and was an Ulster Minor Football Championship runner-up in 1957. Murphy subsequently joined the Down junior team, winning an Ulster Junior Football Championship medal in 1958. By this stage he had also joined the Down senior team, making his debut during the 1957 Dr Lagan Cup. Over the course of the next ten seasons, Murphy won back-to-back All-Ireland medals in 1960 and 1961. He also won six Ulster Senior Football Championship medals and two National Football League medals. He played his last game for Down in August 1967 when an injury forced his retirement from inter-county activity.

After being chosen on the Ulster inter-provincial team in 1962, Murphy was an automatic choice on the starting fifteen for the following few seasons. During that time he won two Railway Cup medals.

In retirement from playing, Murphy combined his teaching career with a new role as a coach and manager. He took charge of the St. Colman's Lisnacree, Kilkeel and Rostrevor club sides in the late 1970s and early 1980s. Murphy was in charge of Ulster Polytechnic in the All-Ireland Freshers' Championship in 1983–84. He was also at the helm in 1985 as the college entered the Sigerson Cup for the first time.

Murphy died at the age of 78 at his home in Rostrevor in February 2017.

In 2019 the GAA set up five U20 Football Development Leagues to give each county a number of league games in advance of the knock-out provincial championships. One of the new five competitions was the Leo Murphy Cup. The others being the Philly McGuinness Cup, the John Kerins Cup, the Liam Connor Cup and the Andrew Corden Cup. Down won the first Leo Murphy Cup defeating Cavan in the final 1–14 to 0-11.
