= Quintin Cogly =

Roman-catholic bishop

- Roman Catholic Diocese of Dromore

Orders
- Consecration: 1536

Personal details
- Born: c. 1500
- Died: 1539 (aged 38–39)
- Denomination: Roman Catholic Church

Quintin Cogly was an Irish clergyman and bishop for the Roman Catholic Diocese of Dromore. He raised in Gaelic Irish family root. He settled in the Barony of Carra. He was a student at Paris in 1520s and entered the Dominican order. He became ordained in 1536. He was appointed bishop in 1536. He died in 1539.
