= Henry O'Neill (bishop) =

Irish Catholic Priest

- Bishop of Dromore
- Church: Catholic Church
- Diocese: Diocese of Dromore
- In office: 20 May 1901 – 9 October 1915
- Predecessor: Thomas MacGivern
- Successor: Edward Mulhern

Orders
- Ordination: 1867
- Consecration: 7 July 1901 by Michael Logue

Personal details
- Born: 3 January 1843 Dromore, County Down, United Kingdom of Great Britain and Ireland
- Died: 9 October 1915 (aged 72) Newry, Counties Armagh and Down, United Kingdom of Great Britain and Ireland

Henry O'Neill (Dromore, 3 January 1843 – Newry, 9 October 1915) was an Irish Catholic Priest who served as Bishop of Dromore from 1901 to 1915.

O'Neill was educated at St Colman's College, Newry and St Patrick's College, Maynooth. He was ordained priest in 1867. He was head teacher of his old school from 1869 to 1886; and parish priest at Clonallan from 1886 to 1901. He was ordained Bishop of Dromore in 1901, a post he held until his death.

Catholic Church titles
Preceded by Thomas MacGivern	Bishop of Dromore; 1901–1915	Succeeded by Edward Mulhern
