= Thomas Fletcher (bishop) =

Irish bishop

Thomas Fletcher was an 18th-century Anglican bishop in Ireland.

Before his appointment as Bishop of Dromore in 1744 Fletcher had previously been Dean of Down. When translated to Killdare the following year he also became Dean of Christ Church Cathedral, Dublin as the two posts were held in commendam. A Fellow of All Souls College, Oxford, he died on 18 March 1761.

Religious titles
Preceded by Henry Maule	Bishop of Dromore; 1744–1745	Succeeded by Jemmett Browne
Preceded by George Stone	Bishop of Kildare; Dean of Christ Church Cathedral, Dublin; 1745–1761	Succeeded by Richard Robinson
