= Arthur Magennis =

Irish bishop

Arthur Magennis was an Irish bishop in the sixteenth century: he was appointed Bishop of Dromore by the Pope in 1550. This was confirmed later that year by Edward VI.
