= Michael Blake (bishop) =

Irish Catholic Priest

- Bishop of Dromore
- Church: Catholic Church
- Diocese: Diocese of Dromore
- In office: 22 January 1833 – 27 February 1860
- Predecessor: Thomas Kelly
- Successor: John Pius Leahy

Orders
- Consecration: 17 March 1833 by Thomas Kelly

Personal details
- Born: 16 July 1775 Dublin, Kingdom of Ireland, British Empire
- Died: 6 March 1860 (aged 84)

Bishop Michael Blake (born 16 July 1775, in Dublin; died 6 March 1860) was an Irish Catholic Priest who served as Bishop of Dromore from 1833 to 1860.

Michael Blake was born in Dublin in 1775, went to Rome at the age of seventeen to study for the priesthood. Dr Blake studied at the Pontifical Irish College, Rome and left when the college was closed in 1798 by order of Napoleon during the French occupation. Dr Blake was ordained in Dublin and served as Vicar General of Dublin before he returned to the Irish College for its restoration in 1826.

He was succeeded at the Irish College by Dr Christopher Boylan. Fr Blake returned to Ireland, he was appointed Parish Priest to Westland Row, Dublin in 1831, and was appointed Bishop of Dromore in 1833.

He died on 6 March 1860 and is buried in St Mary’s Cemetery. Bishop Blake was succeeded as Bishop of Dromore by Dr. John Pius Leahy, O.P. who had been his coadjutor since 1854.
