= Christopher Boylan =

Irish priest

Christopher H. Boylan was an Irish Priest who served as Rector of the Pontifical Irish College, Rome. A priest in the Diocese of Meath, Dr. Boylan was professor of Hebrew from 1816 and was a Professor of English Elocution from 1818, and jointly professor of English Elocution and French Language from 1820 in St. Patrick's College, Maynooth.

Dr. Boylan was appointed by Bishop Daniel Murray to succeed Dr Michael Blake as Rector in 1828, and he was succeeded by the future Cardinal Dr.Paul Cullen, shortly afterwards in 1832 due to ill health Dr Boylan returned to Ireland, and died shortly afterwards.

Academic offices
Preceded by Dr. Michael Blake	Rectors of the Pontifical Irish College, Rome; 1828–1830	Succeeded by Dr. Paul Cullen
