= Eugene O'Doherty (bishop) =

Irish bishop

- Bishop of Dromore
- Church: Catholic Church
- Diocese: Diocese of Dromore
- In office: 11 March 1944 – 22 November 1975
- Predecessor: Edward Mulhern
- Successor: Francis Gerard Brooks

Orders
- Ordination: 19 June 1921
- Consecration: 28 May 1944 by William MacNeely

Personal details
- Born: 4 February 1896 Glencrow (near Moville), County Donegal, United Kingdom of Great Britain and Ireland
- Died: 24 March 1979 (aged 83)

Eugene O'Doherty (4 Feb 1896 – 24 March 1979) was the Bishop of the Roman Catholic Diocese of Dromore, Northern Ireland.

== Early life and priestly ministry ==
O'Doherty was educated at St Columb's College, Derry and St Patrick's College, Maynooth. Ordained a priest for the Diocese of Derry in 1921, he undertook postgraduate studies and received a D.D. for his thesis, Doctrinal Process and its Laws. He spent much of his priestly ministry in education on the staff of St. Columb's College being appointed vice president in 1939 and eventually succeeded as President in 1943.

He was appointed Bishop of Dromore within months of his assuming the post. The appointment was made on 11 March 1944 and he received episcopal consecration on Pentecost Sunday, 23 May 1944.

== His term as bishop ==
While O'Doherty was bishop 18 new schools were opened across the diocese.

He was in charge of implementing the Second Vatican Council's changes to the liturgy.

He retired in November 1975 and died four years later.

Catholic Church titles
Preceded by Edward Mulhern	Bishop of Dromore; 1944–1975	Succeeded by Francis Gerard Brooks
