= Henry Maule (bishop) =

Irish Anglican bishop

Henry Maule was an 18th-century Anglican bishop in Ireland.

Maule had previously been Dean of Cloyne from 1720 to 1726. A member of the Royal Dublin Society, he died on 13 April 1758.

Church of Ireland titles
Preceded by Charles Crow	Bishop of Cloyne; 1726–1732	Succeeded by Edward Synge
Preceded by Charles Cobbe	Bishop of Dromore; 1732–1744	Succeeded by Thomas Fletcher
Preceded by Arthur Price	Bishop of Meath; 1744–1758	Succeeded by William Carmichael
