= John Leslie (bishop of Clogher) =

Scottish royalist bishop of Clogher

John Leslie (14 October 1571 – 8 September 1671) was a Scottish royalist and Church of Ireland bishop of Clogher, who became known as the "fighting bishop" for his resistance, first to the Irish clans of Ulster during the Rising of 1641 and then to the New Model Army during the later Cromwellian conquest of Ireland. He is also notable for almost reaching the age of 100.

== Life ==
The oldest son of George Leslie and Marjory, his wife, he was born at Crichie in Aberdeenshire, 14 October 1571. He was educated at Aberdeen and afterwards in France. He lived abroad for two decades, mainly in Spain, where his Latinity was admired. He was admitted to read in the Bodleian Library in 1618, and in 1624 he graduated Doctor of Divinity (DD) at Trinity College, Cambridge, per literas regias. He was in favour with James I of England, who made him a privy councillor in Scotland, and with Charles I of England, who gave him the same rank in Ireland, and this he retained after the Restoration of Charles II. He was with George Villiers, 1st Duke of Buckingham at Rhé in 1627.

His first preferment seems to have been in London to the church of St. Martins-in-the-Vintry, and he was promoted to be Bishop of the Isles in 1628.

In his efforts to enforce the King's religious settlement, Bishop Leslie sometimes ran into opposition from the local Scottish nobility (Scottish Gaelic: flath). This was particularly true during the Bishop's efforts to shut down the strictly illegal and underground pastoral work in his Diocese by Franciscan missionaries dispatched from the similarly underground Catholic Church in Ireland during the 1620s and '30s.

Upon 9 September 1630, Fr. Patrick Hegarty, OFM, was arrested upon South Uist by priest hunters commanded in person by Bishop Leslie, but before the bishop could deliver Fr. Hegarty for trial, however, Raghnall Mac Ailein 'ic Iain (Ranald MacDonald of Benbecula), the uncle of the then Chief of Clan MacDonald of Clanranald and great-great-grandfather to Scottish Gaelic national poet Alasdair Mac Mhaighstir Alasdair, intervened and relieved the Bishop and his posse of their captive. The incident infuriated King Charles I, who sent a furious letter about it to Privy Council of Scotland on 10 December 1630 and was followed by unsuccessful efforts to summon the Highland nobleman to Inverary for criminal prosecution.

In June 1633, Bishop Leslie was translated to the bishopric of Raphoe in the Church of Ireland. Here he found many of the mensal lands in the hands of lay erenagh families, but recovered some by a lawsuit. In 1635 he had a dispute with one John Hamilton, in which John Bramhall, at Thomas Wentworth's request, undertook to arbitrate. He built a fortified palace at Raphoe, where there had been no episcopal mansion.

The outbreak of the Irish Rebellion of 1641 tested the defences of the palace. The bishop raised a company of foot for the king, distinguished himself as a partisan leader, and conveyed ammunition through from Dublin to Derry. He relieved Sir Ralph Gore, who was hard beset at Magherabeg, near Donegal. Leslie is said to have gone to Scotland about midsummer 1642, all the other bishops having previously left Ireland; but he returned after the king's execution, defended Raphoe against the New Model Army just as he had done against the Gaels, and was one of the last Cavalier leaders to submit.

Leslie was the only Anglican bishop who remained in Ireland after its conquest by the Commonwealth of England. Despite the religious persecution of the Anglican Communion, Leslie illegally confirmed children in Dublin and ordained clergymen. Leslie could get away with this because his wit and aristocratic manners had gained him the covert protection of Henry Cromwell and he was for a time in receipt of a pension. To do homage to the Stuart Restoration in 1660, Leslie, then nearly ninety, is said to have ridden from Chester to London in twenty-four hours. He was allowed to hold the deanery of Raphoe along with his bishopric, but resigned it on being translated to Clogher in June 1661. The bishop was recommended by King Charles II to the special consideration of the Irish House of Commons, and £2,000 were voted to him. In returning thanks, he hoped 'that whatever the house hath given to a prophet may receive a prophet's reward'.

He bought Glasslough in Monaghan; it was one of the many forfeited estates which had been granted to Sir Thomas Ridgeway. The Leslie family historian says that the bishop's wife was heiress of Glasslough. The town was long known as Castle-Leslie. At his death on 8 September 1671, he transmitted his estate to his children. He was buried there in the church of St. Saviour, which he had founded. The slab which covered his remains recorded that the bishop died a centenarian, that he was a doctor of divinity and laws, and that he was a privy councillor to three kings. Bishop Maxwell of Kilmore composed an epitaph.

== Family ==
In 1638 the bishop was married to Catherine, daughter of Alexander Cunningham, Dean of Raphoe and Marian Murray, who was aged eighteen. She is said to have been one of twenty-seven children. They had ten children, of whom John, the eldest surviving son, was dean of Dromore. The sixth son was Charles Leslie the nonjuror, whose great-grandson was John Leslie, Bishop of Kilmore, Elphin and Ardagh (son of Charles Leslie MP).

Church of Scotland titles
Preceded by Thomas Knox	Bishop of the Isles; 1628–1633	Succeeded by Neil Campbell
Church of Ireland titles
Preceded by Andrew Knox	Bishop of Raphoe; 1633–1661	Succeeded by Robert Leslie
Preceded by Henry Jones	Bishop of Clogher; 1661–1671	Succeeded by Robert Leslie
