= John McAreavey =

- Bishop Emeritus of Dromore
- Church: Catholic Church
- Diocese: Diocese of Dromore
- In office: 4 June 1999 – 26 March 2018
- Predecessor: Francis Gerard Brooks
- Successor: Sede Vacante

Orders
- Ordination: 10 June 1973
- Consecration: 19 September 1999 by Seán Brady

Personal details
- Born: 2 February 1949 (age 77) Banbridge, County Down, Northern Ireland, United Kingdom
- Coat of arms

John McAreavey (born 2 February 1949 in Banbridge, County Down) was the Catholic Bishop of Dromore from 1999 to 2018.

== Early life and education ==
John McAreavey was born at Drumnagally, Banbridge, in 1949. He was the son of John and Mary McAreavey (both deceased). He has two sisters and two brothers. He received his primary education at Ballyvarley School and then the Abbey Primary School, Newry. He received his secondary education at St Colman's College, Newry. In September 1966 he entered St Patrick's College, Maynooth where in 1969 he awarded a B.A. in Modern Languages and in 1972 a B.D. in Divinity.

== Priest ==
McAreavey was ordained as priest for the Diocese of Dromore by Bishop Eugene O'Doherty on 10 June 1973. McAreavey returned to Maynooth after his ordination and completed a Licentiate in Sacred Theology in 1974. He was a post-graduate student of Canon Law at the Pontifical Gregorian University, Rome from 1974 to 1978 when he graduated with a Doctorate in Canon Law.

From 1978 to 1979, McAreavey was a member of the teaching staff of St Colman's College. He was appointed to the Armagh Regional Marriage Tribunal in 1979. He became headmaster of the school in 1983; he held this post until 1991. Meanwhile, he had been appointed in 1988 Professor of Canon Law in the St Patrick's College, Maynooth. While there he wrote widely on church law, publishing in 1997 The Canon Law of Marriage and the Family. He served on the editorial board of the Irish Theological Quarterly from 1998. He is a member of the Canon Law Society of Great Britain and Ireland, and the Canon Law Society of America. In 1994 he became secretary of the Greenhills Ecumenical Conference Committee.

Throughout his entire ministry, McAreavey has been involved in the pastoral care of engaged and married couples. A fluent Gaelic speaker, he is a member of the committee of Coláiste Bhríde in Rann na Feirste. He is also fluent in Italian, German and French .

== Bishop ==
McAreavey was ordained as Bishop of Dromore on 19 September 1999. The Principal Consecrator was Archbishop Seán Brady; his Principal Co-Consecrators were Bishop John Magee and his predecessor Francis Brooks.

In November 2012 it was announced he was to take a break or sabbatical from administering the diocese. After a six-month break which included study and foreign travel he resumed full duties in 2013. He was among the first bishops to develop the permanent diaconate in his diocese and in June 2014 ordained two men for service in the Diocese of Dromore.

In February 2018, McAreavey was the subject of intense media scrutiny over his handling of the allegations of child sex scandal by a priest of his diocese, Malachy Finnegan. Although not accused of sexual misconduct himself, he denied knowing about paedophile priest, Finnegan, despite media disclosure to the contrary. McAreavey had already concelebrated Mass in 2000 with Finnegan, in Hilltown, Co. Down and was celebrant officiating at the Funeral Mass of the known abuser in 2002. He sent his resignation from his role as Bishop of Dromore on 1 March 2018 to Pope Francis who accepted it on the 26th of the same month.
