= John Pius Leahy =

Irish Catholic Priest

John Pius Leahy O.P.
- Bishop of Dromore
- Church: Catholic Church
- Diocese: Diocese of Dromore
- In office: 6 March 1860 – 6 September 1890
- Predecessor: Michael Blake
- Successor: Thomas MacGivern
- Previous posts: Titular Bishop of Aulon (1854-1860); Coadjutor Bishop of Dromore (1854-1860)

Orders
- Ordination: 6 August 1826
- Consecration: 1 October 1854 by Joseph Dixon

Personal details
- Born: 25 July 1802 Cork, County Cork, United Kingdom of Great Britain and Ireland
- Died: 6 September 1890 (aged 88) Newry, Counties Armagh and Down, United Kingdom of Great Britain and Ireland

John Pius Leahy, O.P. (b. Cork 25 July 1802; d. Newry 6 September 1890) was an Irish Catholic Priest who served as Bishop of Dromore from 1860 to 1890.

Aged 15, Leahy sailed from Cork for Lisbon. He was received into the Dominican Order on 8 September 1817; professed on 9 September 1818; and priested on 6 August 1826. He spent 30 years in Lisbon, rising to be Professor of Philosophy, Theology and Ecclesiastical History. Returning to his native Cork where he served as prior in St. Mary's Dominican Church and Priory. Leahy was appointed Coadjutor Bishop of Dromore on 7 July 1854; and consecrated on 1 October 1854. He succeeded as Diocesan Bishop of Dromore on 27 February 1860; and served until his death.

Bishop Leahy invited his order the Dominicans (Order of Preachers) to Newry in 1871 where they built the magnificent St Catherine’s Church.

Catholic Church titles
Preceded by Michael Blake	Bishop of Dromore; 1860–1890	Succeeded by Thomas MacGivern
