= Patrick Curtis (bishop) =

Roman Catholic Archbishop of Armagh

- Archbishop of Armagh; Primate of All Ireland
- Church: Catholic Church
- Archdiocese: Archdiocese of Armagh
- In office: 27 August 1819 – 26 July 1832
- Predecessor: Richard O'Reilly
- Successor: Thomas Kelly

Orders
- Consecration: 28 October 1819 by John Troy

Personal details
- Born: c. 1746 Stamullen, Counties Meath & Dublin, Kingdom of Ireland, British Empire
- Died: 26 July 1832 (aged 85–86)

Styles of Patrick Curtis
- Reference style: The Most Reverend
- Spoken style: Your Grace or Archbishop

Patrick Curtis (1740 – 26 July 1832) was an Irish prelate of the Roman Catholic Church. He served as the Archbishop of Armagh and Primate of All Ireland from 1819 to 1832.

== Biography ==
Patrick Curtis was born in Stamullen, County Meath in 1746. He studied for the priesthood in Salamanca in Spain. Curtis was the Rector of the Irish College at Salamanca, Spain, from 1780 until 1817, and professor at the University of Salamanca, where he was known as Don Patricio Cortés. Whilst in Spain he was spymaster of a network that provided military intelligence to Wellesley's Anglo-Portuguese Army during the Peninsular War. His friendship with Wellington assisted in his promotion to Armagh. It is also thought to have paved the way to Catholic Emancipation, to which the Anglo-Irish Wellington was a late but genuine convert.

After his return to Ireland, he lived on a British Government pension until he was appointed the archbishop of the Metropolitan see of Armagh by the Propaganda Fide on 2 August and confirmed by Pope Gregory XVI on 8 August 1819. His episcopal ordination took place on 28 October 1819.

== Bibliography ==
- Brady, W. Maziere (1876). The Episcopal Succession in England, Scotland and Ireland, A.D. 1400 to 1875. Vol. 1. Rome: Tipografia Della Pace.
- Fryde, E. B.; Greenway, D. E.; Porter, S.; Roy, I., eds. (1986). Handbook of British Chronology (3rd, reprinted 2003 ed.). Cambridge: Cambridge University Press. ISBN 0-521-56350-X.

Catholic Church titles
Preceded by Richard O'Reilly	Archbishop of Armagh and Primate of All Ireland; 1819–1832	Succeeded by Thomas Kelly
