= Theophilus Buckworth =

Irish Anglican priest

Theophilus Buckworth, (b, d Wisbech) a Fellow of Trinity College, Cambridge, was an Irish Anglican priest: he was Bishop of Dromore from 1613 until his death on 8 September 1652.
