= Edward Mulhern =

Northern Irish Bishop

Most Reverend Dr Edward Mulhern
- Bishop of Dromore
- Church: Roman Catholic Church
- See: Diocese of Dromore
- In office: April 1916 - August 1943
- Predecessor: Most Reverend Dr Henry O'Neill
- Successor: Most Reverend Dr Eugene O'Doherty
- Previous post: Parish Priest of Bundoran in Diocese of Clogher

Personal details
- Born: 28 January 1863 Ederney, County Fermanagh, Ireland
- Died: 12 August 1943 (aged 80) Newry

Edward Mulhern (28 January 1863 – 12 August 1943) was the Roman Catholic Bishop of the Diocese of Dromore, Northern Ireland.

He was a native of Ederney in County Fermanagh and after a local education was ordained priest in Maynooth College 16 September 1889 for service in the Diocese of Clogher.

He spent many years as a teacher in, and was eventually President of, St Macartan's College in Monaghan. In 1903 he moved to parish ministry and was Parish Priest of Bundoran at the time of his elevation.

His appointment to Dromore was announced on 31 Jan 1916 and he received episcopal consecration in Newry on 30 April 1916.

Among his principal works as Bishop was wiping out the debt on and thus formally consecrating the cathedral of Saints Patrick and Colman in Newry and the restoration of the Cathedral Chapter.

He died in office in August 1943.

Catholic Church titles
Preceded by Henry O'Neill	Bishop of Dromore; 1916–1943	Succeeded by Eugene O'Doherty
