= Francis Gerard Brooks =

Catholic bishop

- Bishop of Dromore
- Church: Catholic Church
- Diocese: Diocese of Dromore
- In office: 20 November 1975 – 4 June 1999
- Predecessor: Eugene O'Doherty
- Successor: John McAreavey

Orders
- Ordination: 19 June 1949
- Consecration: 25 January 1976 by William Conway

Personal details
- Born: 14 January 1924 Rathfriland, County Down, Northern Ireland, United Kingdom
- Died: 4 September 2010 (aged 86)

Francis Gerard Brooks (14 January 1924 – 4 September 2010) was the Catholic Bishop of the Diocese of Dromore, Northern Ireland.

== Biography ==
Born in Rathfriland, County Down, he was confirmed 22 April 1934 in Barnmeen Church, Drumgath Parish before proceeding first to the Abbey Christian Brothers' Grammar School, then St Colman's College, Newry where eventually he was appointed Head Prefect, for his secondary education.

In 1942 he entered St Patrick's College, Maynooth to begin his studies for the priesthood, where he graduated with a BSc (in mathematical science) in 1945 and again with a Bachelor of Divinity in 1948. He was ordained Priest 19 June 1949.

After ordination he pursued post-graduate studies in Rome, achieving his Doctorate in Canon Law in June 1952. Dr Brooks was appointed in the autumn of 1953 to the staff of St. Colman's College, where he taught Science, Geography and Mathematics. He was appointed College President in 1972 and in the same year a Canon of the Cathedral Chapter.

His appointment as Bishop was made public on 20 November 1975, and he received episcopal ordination on 25 January 1976. The principal consecrator was Cardinal William Conway; the principal co-consecrators were the Papal Nuncio Archbishop Gaetano Alibrandi and Bishop Eugene O'Doherty, the retiring bishop of the diocese.

In early 2018 it became known that Bishop Brooks had failed, on more than one occasion, to stop the behaviour of his paedophile colleague on the staff of St. Colman's College, preferring instead a "pastoral" approach.

Brooks retired on 4 June 1999, and was succeeded by John McAreavey. He remained as Bishop Emeritus of the Diocese of Dromore until his death on 2 September 2010, aged 86. At his funeral Mass his successor John McAreavey observed that "his life was touched often by the Troubles; the violence and suffering of many people in the diocese in those years affected him deeply. The discouragement of those years weighed heavily upon him."
