= Colmán of Dromore =

6th-century Irish saint

Saint Colman of Dromore
- Venerated in: Roman Catholicism, Eastern Orthodoxy
- Feast: 7 June
- Patronage: Roman Catholic Diocese of Dromore

Saint Colmán of Dromore, also known by the pet form Mocholmóc, was a 6th-century Irish saint.

== Life ==
Colman was a native of Dalriada, born roughly a generation after Patrick's apostolate to Ireland, and was baptized by a bishop, bearing his own name who was also his uncle. It is believed that Colman was educated at the monastic foundation at Nendrum, on the shores of Strangford Lough, which had been established by Saint Caolán (Mochaoi) sometime earlier. Colman was a disciple of Caolán when the latter ruled as Abbot of Nendrum about 520.

Tradition has it that Caolán was so impressed with Colman's potential as a Christian apostle and with his charism for performing miracles that he sent him to visit various other monasteries so that he might learn from the religious practices and forms of community life he would encounter there and enjoy the opportunity of more extensive learning, especially in Holy Scripture. To perfect his knowledge of the Scriptures St. Colman went to the great school of Emly, c. 470 or 475, and remained there some years. At length he returned to Mahee Island to see his old master, St. Mochae, and remained under his guidance for a long period, acting as assistant in the school. Among his many pupils at Mahee Island, in the first quarter of the sixth century, was St. Finnian of Moville.

He was the first abbot of Muckmore, in County Antrim, and afterwards was persuaded by Saint Mac Nissi to settle at Dromore. Colman set up a small wattle and daub church on this site around 514, probably thatched with reeds from the River Lagan which flows beside it. His followers observed a very strict rule of discipline. St. Finnian, who later established a monastery at Movilla, about five miles from Bangor, is believed to have been a former monk of Dromore. During Colman's lifetime the abbey came to enjoy the status of an Episcopal See and so Colman possibly finished his days not just as Abbot of Dromore, but also as Bishop. St. Colman is said to have baptised Saint Declán of Ardmore.

== Veneration ==
His feastday is on 7 June.

== Patronage ==
Colman is the principal patron of the Diocese of Dromore.

== Legacy ==
St.Colman's College was founded by Fr. J.S. Keenan in William Street, Newry in 1823 as the Dromore Diocesan Seminary. Known throughout Ireland as Violet Hill, the College has occupied its rural setting since 1829.
