= Roman Catholic Diocese of Dromore =

Catholic diocese in Northern Ireland

Coordinates: 54.1746°N 6.3381°W

Diocese of Dromore Dioecesis Dromorensis Deoise an Droma Mhóir

Catholic
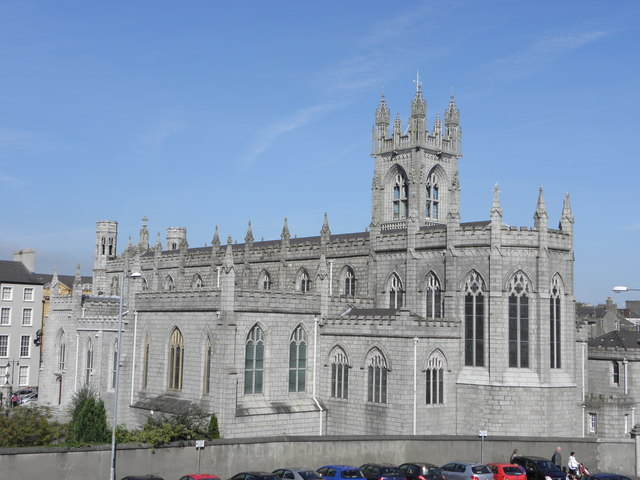
- St. Patrick and St. Colman’s Cathedral, Newry

Location
- Country: Northern Ireland
- Territory: Parts of counties Antrim, Armagh and Down
- Ecclesiastical province: Province of Armagh

Statistics
- Area: 386 sq mi (1,000 km^{2})
- Population: Total; Catholics: (as of 2022); 204,000; 93,000 (45.6%)
- Parishes: 22
- Churches: 47

Information
- Denomination: Catholic
- Sui iuris church: Latin Church
- Rite: Roman Rite
- Established: Diocese in circa 1192
- Cathedral: St. Patrick and St. Colman’s Cathedral, Newry
- Patron saint: St Patrick and St Colman
- Secular priests: 45

Current leadership
- Pope: Leo XIV
- Bishop: Sede Vacante
- Metropolitan Archbishop: Eamon Martin
- Apostolic Administrator: Eamon Martin
- Bishops emeritus: John McAreavey

Map
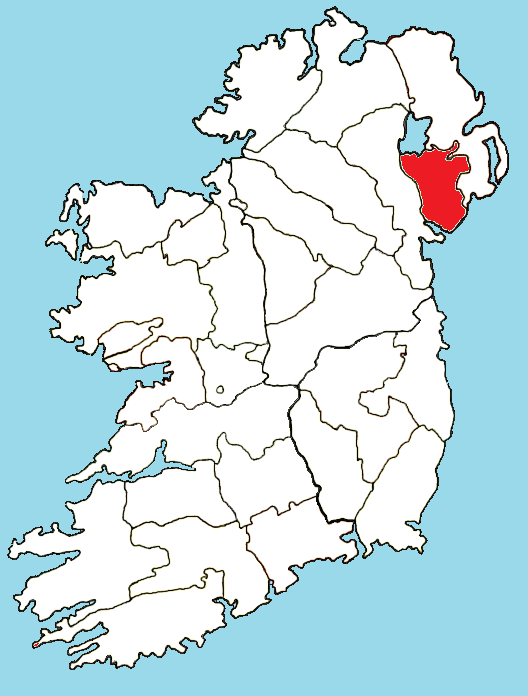

Website
- dromorediocese.org

The Diocese of Dromore (Latin: Dioecesis Dromorensis) is a Latin Church diocese of the Catholic Church in Northern Ireland. It is one of eight suffragan dioceses which are subject to the Metropolitan Archdiocese of Armagh.

The diocese has lacked an ordinary since 2018. The most recent bishop was John McAreavey.

== Geographical remit ==
The geographical remit of the see includes portions of the counties of Down, Armagh and Antrim which are all situated in Northern Ireland. Large population centres in the diocese include Newry, Banbridge, Craigavon, Lurgan and Warrenpoint. The bishop's seat (cathedra) is in the cathedral church of SS Patrick and Colman, Newry.

== History ==
=== Foundation ===
The monastery of Dromore is believed to have been founded in the sixth century by St Colman (called also Mocholmóc), probably the first Abbot of Dromore. The first building was a small wattle and daub church on the northern bank of the River Lagan. The Diocese of Dromore was established through the reorganisation of the Irish Church in the late 12th century, possibly at the synod held in Dublin in 1192 by the papal legate, Múirges Ua hÉnna, Archbishop of Cashel. The diocese coincided with the territory of the Uí Echach Cobo, which later became the baronies of Upper and Lower Iveagh, and the lordship of Newry, County Down.

=== Post-reformation ===
During the 16th century Reformation, the Roman Catholic Church lost control of the old cathedral in Dromore to the Protestant Church of Ireland, which was wholly destroyed during the rebellion of 1641 and rebuilt twenty years later.

In the 19th century, the Church chose the site of a new cathedral at Newry, the largest town of County Down, and a place of significant ecclesiastical importance as the site of an ancient monastery, situated at the head of Carlingford Lough. Work for building of Newry Cathedral begun in 1823 and was completed in 1829 by Dr. Michael Blake (bishop of Dromore 1833–1860) who had been Vicar-General of Dublin and the restorer of the Irish College at Rome. This cathedral was enlarged and beautified by Bishop Henry O'Neill, who succeeded Bishop Thomas MacGivern in 1901.

Under McGivern's predecessor, John Pius Leahy, O.P. (1860–1890), a Dominican priory was founded on the Armagh side of Newry, and a church erected. The Poor Clares, who went to Newry from Harold's Cross, Dublin, in 1830, were for many years the only nuns north of the River Boyne. The Sisters of Mercy founded a convent at Newry in 1855.

Abbey Yard in Newry marks the site of the Cistercian abbey founded in 1144 by St. Bernard's friend, St. Malachy O'Morgair, and endowed in 1157 by Maurice O'Loughlin, High King of Ireland. It is called in the annals Monasterium de Viridi Ligno — a name given to Newry from the yew-tree, said to have been planted there by St. Patrick, the Irish name being Niubar (and sometimes Newrkintragh, "the yew at the head of the strand") which is Latinized Ivorium or Nevoracum, but more commonly as above Viride Lignum.

Since 2018, the Diocese of Dromore has remained without a Bishop.

== Allegations of sexual abuse ==
In 2012 the parish priest of Donaghmore in the diocese, Terence Rafferty, was convicted of four counts of indecently assaulting a young girl in 2001. Five other offences were left on the books. The offences had been reported to the diocese in 2011: the diocese suspended him and promptly informed the relevant authorities.

In October 2017, the Diocese of Dromore settled what was described as the "biggest ever pay-out in a historical abuse case in Northern Ireland" over claims that Fr Malachy Finnegan, who was President of the College between 1976 and 1987, sexually abused a pupil. Finnegan, who died in 2002, was the subject of twelve abuse allegations which were reported between 1994 and 2016. In the weeks following the scandal, the school removed all photographs depicting Fr Finnegan from the interior of its building.

On 1 March 2018, Bishop John McAreavey resigned as Bishop of Dromore with immediate effect amid controversy concerning his knowledge of, and behaviour towards, the priest Malachy Finnegan. McAreavey celebrated Mass alongside him in 2000, despite knowing Finnegan to be a paedophile against whom very serious criminal allegations had been made. In 2002, McAreavey celebrated the funeral Mass of Malachy Finegan in Warrenpoint, County Down, Northern Ireland.

Pope Francis accepted McAreavey's resignation on 26 March 2018 and Bishop Philip Boyce was appointed Apostolic Administrator.

On 15 April 2019, Pope Francis appointed the Archbishop of Armagh Eamon Martin as Apostolic Administrator of the diocese.

In September 2021, the Diocese of Dromore would set up a redress scheme with the hopes of being able to garner enough money to pay settlements for victims and survivors of clerical sex abuse who were sexually abused by clergy who served in the diocese.

On 22 September 2025, the Diocese of Dromore was ordered by the High Court to pay £170,000 in damages to another alleged victim of Fr Malachy Finnegan.

== Ordinaries ==
The following is a list of the bishops since the beginning of the 19th century.

- Edmund Derry (1801–1819)
- Hugh O'Kelly (1820–1825)
- Thomas Kelly (1826–1833)
- Michael Blake (bishop) (1833–1860)
- John Pius Leahy, O.P. (1860–1890)
- Thomas MacGivern (1890–1900)
- Henry O'Neill (1901–1915)
- Edward Mulhern (1916–1943)
- Eugene O'Doherty (1944–1975)
- Francis Gerard Brooks (1976–1999)
- John McAreavey (1999–2018)

== See also ==
- Roman Catholicism in Ireland
- List of Roman Catholic dioceses in Northern Ireland
- Apostolic Nuncio to Ireland
