= Bishop of Achonry =

Episcopal title in Ireland

- Bishopric

catholic
- Incumbent; Sede vacante
- Style: His Lordship

Location
- Country: Ireland

Information
- First holder: Máel Ruanaid Ua Ruadáin
- Established: 1152
- Cathedral: Cathedral of the Annunciation of the Blessed Virgin Mary and St Nathy, Ballaghaderreen

Website
- achonrydiocese.org

The Bishop of Achonry (Irish: Easpag Achadh Conaire) is an episcopal title which takes its name after the village of Achonry in County Sligo, Ireland. In the Roman Catholic Church it remains as a separate title, but in the Church of Ireland it has been united with other bishoprics.

== History ==
In the sixth century, the monastery at Achonry was founded by Saint Nathy, a disciple of Saint Finnian of Clonard. The superiors of the monastery were styled abbots or bishops of Achad Cain or Achad Conaire, and in some of the Irish annals they were called bishops of Luighne. It was not until 1152 that the Diocese of Achonry was established at the Synod of Kells.

During the Reformation, the bishops changed their allegiance back and forth between the Pope and the Tudors. After the Reformation, there were parallel apostolic successions: one of the Church of Ireland and the other of the Roman Catholic Church.

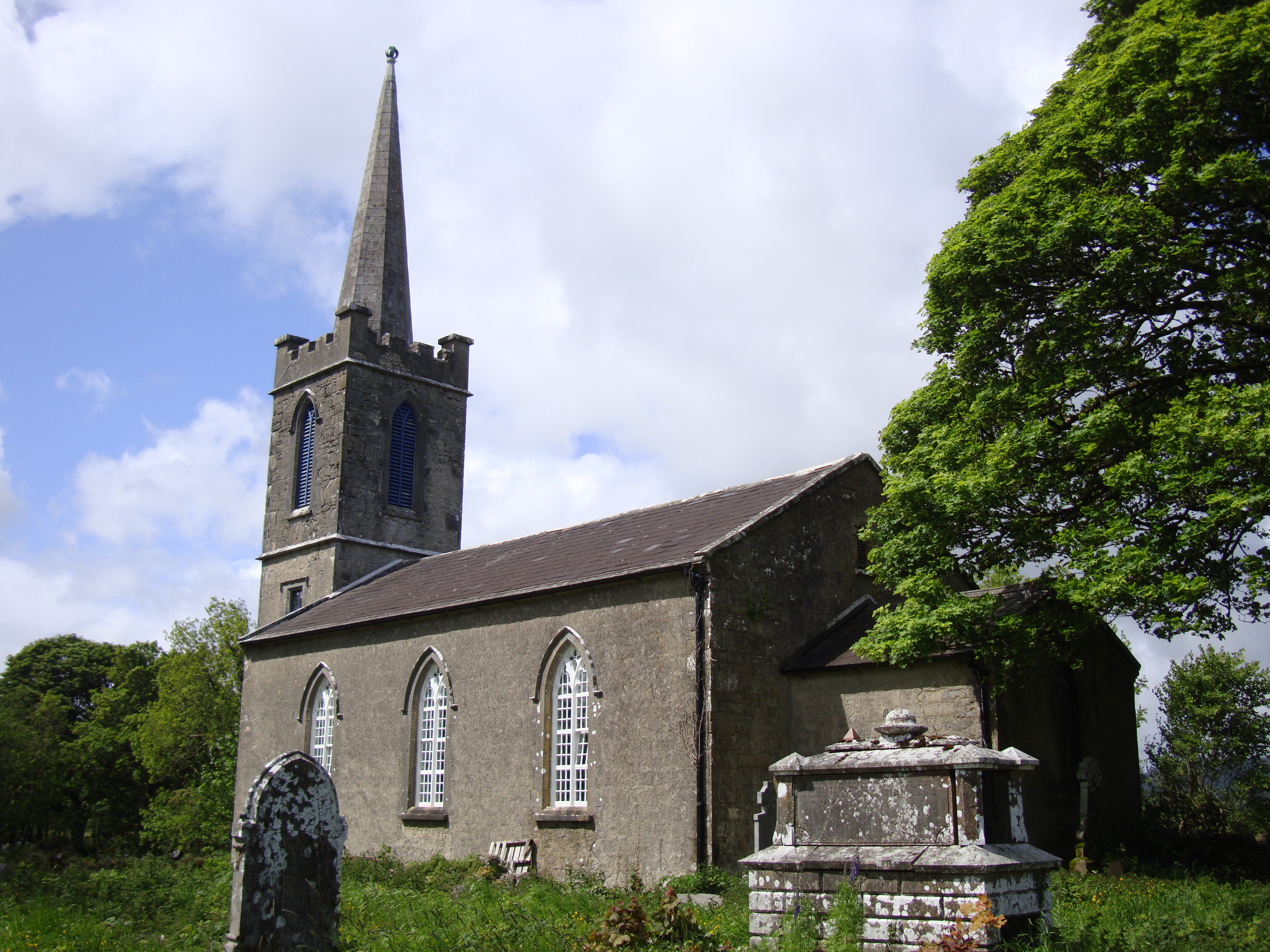
The former cathedral of St Crumnathy, Achonry

In the Church of Ireland, the see of Achonry continued as a separate title until 1622 when it combined with Killala to form the united bishopric of Killala and Achonry. Under the Church Temporalities (Ireland) Act 1833 (3 & 4 Will. 4. c. 37), the combined sees Killala and Achonry became part of the archbishopric of Tuam in 1834. On the death of Archbishop Le Poer Trench in 1839, the Ecclesiastical Province of Tuam lost its metropolitan status and became the united bishopric of Tuam, Killala and Achonry in the Ecclesiastical Province of Armagh.

In the Roman Catholic Church, Achonry remains a separate title. The Roman Catholic bishop's seat (Cathedra) is now located at the Cathedral Church of the Annunciation of the Blessed Virgin Mary and St. Nathy in Ballaghaderreen, County Roscommon. The most recent incumbent was the Most Reverend Paul Dempsey, Bishop of the Roman Catholic Diocese of Achonry, who was appointed by Pope Francis on 27 January 2020, and ordained bishop on 30 August 2020.

== Pre-Reformation bishops ==
Pre-Reformation Bishops of Achonry
From	Until	Ordinary	Notes
bef. 1152	1170	Máel Ruanaid Ua Ruadáin	Present at the Synod of Kells in 1152; died in office
bef. 1179	1208	Gilla na Náem Ua Ruadáin	Resigned before 1208; died 1214; also known as Gelasius
bef. 1208	1219	Clemens Ua Sniadaig, O.Cist	Died in office; also known as Carus
1220	1227	Connmach Ó Torpaig	Previously Abbot of Mellifont; elected before 10 March 1220; died 16 January 1227; buried in Mellifont Abbey
c.1227	1230	Gilla Ísu Ó Cléirig	Died in office; also recorded as Gelasius
c.1231	1237	Tomás Ó Ruadáin	Died in office
c.1238	1248	Áengus Ó Clúmain	Consecrated in circa 1238; resigned before 14 November 1248; retired to the Boyle Abbey and died there in 1264; also known as Eugenius
1248	1251	See vacant	
1251	1265	Tomás Ó Maicín	Elected bishop after 14 February 1251; consecrated before 20 June 1251; died in office in the spring of 1265
1266	1285	Tomás Ó Miadacháin	Previously Archdeacon of Archonry; elected before 27 April 1266; consecrated 19 December 1266; died circa 27 November 1285; also known as Dionysius
1286	1312	Benedictus Ó Bracáin	Elected after 29 April 1286; received possession of the temporalities 17 September 1286; died 19 March 1312; his surname is also recorded as O'Bran, O'Bragan and O'Brogan
1312	1344	David of Kilheny	Elected after 1 May 1312; received possession of the temporalities 1 August 1312; died in office
1348	1373	Nichol alias Muircheartach Ó hEadhra, O.Cist.	Appointed and consecrated bishop 22 October 1348; took received possession of the temporalities 19 March 1349; died in office
1374	1380	William Andrew, O.P.	Appointed 17 October 1373; received possession of the temporalities 1 August 1374; acted as a suffragan bishop in the Diocese of Canterbury in 1380; Translated to Meath
1385	unknown	Simon, O.Cist.	Appointed before 9 July 1385; acted as a suffragan bishop in the dioceses of London 1385, Winchester 1385–95, Canterbury 1386, and Lichfield 1387
unknown	1396	Donatus Ó hEadhra	Died in office; surname also recorded as O'Hara
1396	unknown	Johannes	Appointed before 13 September 1396
unknown	1398	Tomás mac Muirgheasa Mac Donnchadha	Died in office; surname anglicised McDonagh
1401	1409	Brian mac Seaain Ó hEadhra	Appointed before September 1400; consecrated after January 1401; died in office
1410	1434	Maghnus Ó hEadhra ^{[A]}	Appointed 14 April 1410; consecrated before June 1410; died after October 1434; also known as Magonius.^{[B]}
1424	1436	Richard Belmer, O.P. ^{[B]}	Appointed 12 April 1424; consecrated 14 June 1424; titlar Bishop of Scattery Island; acted as a suffragan bishop in the dioceses Worcester and Hereford 1426–33; died before September 1436
1436	1442	Tadhg Ó Dalaigh, O.P.	Appointed 3 September 1436; died in Rome before 15 October 1442; also known as Thaddaeus and Nicholas O'Daly.
1442	1453	James Blakedon, O.P.	Appointed 15 October 1442; acted as a suffragan bishop in the dioceses of Salisbury, Bath and Wells, Exeter, and Worcester between 1442 and 1453; Translated to Bangor 7 February 1453
1449	1473	Cornelius Ó Mochain, O.Cist.	Previously Abbot of Boyle; appointed 15 October 1449; confirmed 5 April 1452; died before July 1473
1463	unknown	Brian Ó hEasdhra	Appointed 2 September 1463; died before May 1484; also known as Benedictus and Bernardus.
1470	unknown	Nicholas Forden	Appointed 22 April 1470
1475	unknown	Robert Wellys, O.F.M.	Appointed 14 July 1473; consecrated 4 June 1475; did not get possession
unknown	1492	Thomas fitzRichard	Died before October 1492
1484	1508	Tomás Ó Conghaláin	Appointed 10 May 1484; died in office
1489		John Bustamente	Spanish monk; Preceptor of the Convent of St. Catherine, Toledo; appointed 23 September 1489, but did not take effect; also recorded as John de Bustamente
1492	after 1504	Thomas de Rivis, O.S.A.	Previously Prior of Huntingdon; appointed 8 October 1492; acted as a suffragan bishop in the dioceses of Lichfield 1495, and Lincoln 1496–1504; died after 1504
1508	1522	Eugenius Ó Flannagáin, O.P.	Appointed 22 December 1508; died before June 1522
1522	1547	Cormac Ó Snighe	Appointed 15 June 1522, but did not get possession; died before June 1547

== Bishops during the Reformation ==
Bishops of Achonry during the Reformation
From	Until	Ordinary	Notes
1547	1555	Thomas O'Fihely	Appointed 16 June 1547; translated to Leighlin 30 August 1555
1556	1561	Cormac O'Coyn, O.P.	Perhaps nominated in 1556 by Queen Mary I, but no record of a papal appointment; died before 12 October 1561; also known as Cormac O'Quin
1562	1603	Eugene O'Hart, O.P.	Formerly Prior of Sligo Abbey; appointed by Pope Pius IV on 28 January 1562; assisted in the Council of Trent; appears to have been recognized by Queen Elizabeth I in circa 1585; died in office; his surname was also recorded as O'Harte

== Post-Reformation bishops ==
=== Church of Ireland succession ===
Church of Ireland Bishops of Achonry
From	Until	Ordinary	Notes
1603	1613	See vacant	
1613	1622	Miler Magrath	Archbishop of Cashel since 1571, he also held "in commendam" the bishopric of Achonry from 1613 until his death on 14 November 1622
1623	1834	See part of the Anglican bishopric of Killala and Achonry	
1834	1839	See part of the Anglican archbishopric of Tuam	
since 1839		See part of the Anglican bishopric of Tuam, Killala and Achonry	

=== Roman Catholic succession ===
Roman Catholic Bishops of Achonry
From	Until	Ordinary	Notes
1603	1629	See vacant	
1629	unknown	(Andrew Lynch)	Appointed vicar apostolic 28 November 1629
1631	1662	(James Ó Fallamháin)	Appointed vicar apostolic 13 January 1631; active as vicar apostolic from 1631 to 1652 (including while Louis Dillon was bishop); imprisoned between 1652 and 1660; died 1662
1641	c.1645	Louis Dillon	Appointed bishop 16 September 1641; died or resigned by 1645
1662	1677	See vacant	
1677	unknown	(Maurice Ó Duarcáin)	Appointed vicar apostolic 8 July 1677
1684	1725	Hugh Mac Diarmata	Appointed as vicar apostolic 21 December 1684 and as bishop 30 April 1707; died 1725
1725	1735	Dominic Ó Dálaigh, O.P.	Appointed 20 September 1725; consecrated 30 November 1725; died 1735
1735	1739	John Ó hAirt	Appointed 30 September 1735; died May 1739
1739	1758	Walter Blake	Appointed 13 August 1739; died 1758
1758	1776	Patrick Robert Kirwan	Appointed 21 August 1758; died March or April 1776
1776	1785	Philip Phillips	Translated from Killala 22 June 1776; later translated Tuam 22 November 1785
1785	1787	Boetius Egan	Appointed 22 November 1785; translated to Tuam 15 December 1787
1788	1803	Tomás Ó Conchúir	Appointed 4 January 1788; consecrated April 1788; died 18 February 1803
1803	1808	Charles Lynagh	Appointed 13 May 1803; consecrated 4 June 1804; died April or May 1808; also recorded as Charles Lynan
1809	1817	John O'Flynn	Appointed 30 June 1809; consecrated 12 November 1809; died 17 July 1817
1818	1852	Patrick MacNicholas	Appointed 23 February 1818; consecrated 17 May 1818; died 11 February 1852
1852	1875	Patrick Durcan	Appointed 4 October 1852; consecrated 30 November 1852; died 1 May 1875
1875	1887	Francis McCormack	Appointed Coadjutor Bishop 21 November 1871; consecrated 4 February 1872; succeeded 1 May 1875; translated to Galway and Kilmacduagh 27 April 1887
1888	1911	John Lyster	Appointed 25 February 1888; consecrated 8 April 1888; died 17 January 1911
1911	1946	Patrick Morrisroe	Appointed 13 May 1911; consecrated 3 September 1911; died 27 May 1946
1947	1976	James Fergus	Appointed 15 February 1947; consecrated 4 May 1947; retired 17 March 1976; died 24 March 1989
1976	2007	Thomas Flynn	Appointed 30 December 1976; consecrated 20 February 1977; retired 20 November 2007
2007	2018	Brendan Kelly	Appointed 20 November 2007; consecrated 27 January 2008; installed as Bishop of Galway 11 February 2018.
2018	2020	See vacant	
2020	2024	Paul Dempsey	Appointed 27 January 2020; consecrated 30 August 2020; translated to Dublin 10 April 2024.

== Notes ==
- ^{A} Maghnus Ó hEadhra and ^{B} Richard Belmer were bishops at the same time.

== See also ==
- Roman Catholic Diocese of Achonry
- Archdiocese of Tuam (Church of Ireland)
- Diocese of Tuam, Killala and Achonry

== Bibliography ==
- Cotton, Henry (1850). The Province of Connaught. Fasti Ecclesiae Hiberniae: The Succession of the Prelates and Members of the Cathedral Bodies of Ireland. Vol. 4. Dublin: Hodges and Smith.
- Fryde, E. B.; Greenway, D. E.; Porter, S.; Roy, I., eds. (1986). Handbook of British Chronology (3rd, Reprinted 2003 ed.). Cambridge: Cambridge University Press. ISBN 0-521-56350-X.
- Moody, T. W.; Martin, F. X.; Byrne, F. J., eds. (1984). Maps, Genealogies, Lists: A Companion to Irish History, Part II. New History of Ireland. Vol. XI. Oxford: Oxford University Press. ISBN 0-19-821745-5.
