= Joseph Cassidy (bishop) =

Irish bishop

The Most Reverend Joseph Cassidy
- Archbishop of Tuam
- Archdiocese: Tuam
- Installed: 22 August 1987 (appointed)
- Term ended: 28 June 1994 (retired)
- Predecessor: Joseph Cunnane
- Successor: Michael Neary
- Other post: Bishop of Clonfert (1982-1987)

Orders
- Ordination: 21 June 1959 (Priest)
- Consecration: 23 September 1979 (Bishop)

Personal details
- Born: 29 October 1933 Charlestown, County Mayo, Ireland
- Died: 31 January 2013 (aged 79) Ballinasloe, County Galway, Ireland
- Buried: County Roscommon, Ireland
- Denomination: Roman Catholic

Joseph Cassidy (29 October 1933 – 31 January 2013) was Bishop of Clonfert from 1982 to 1987 and Archbishop of Tuam from 1987 to 1994.

== Biography ==
He was born in Charlestown, County Mayo Ireland. He entered Maynooth in 1952, gaining a BD and BA(NUI), and was ordained a priest on 21 June 1959, in Maynooth College, for the Diocese of Achonry. He later transferred to the slightly larger Diocese of Clonfert, where he taught at, and later became President of, St. Joseph's College, Ballinasloe.

He was appointed Coadjutor Bishop of Clonfert diocese on 24 August 1979 and received episcopal ordination on 23 September 1979, one week before the historic visit of Pope John Paul II to Ireland. The Principal Consecrator was Archbishop Gaetano Alibrandi; his Principal Co-Consecrators were Archbishop Joseph Cunnane of Tuam and Bishop Thomas Flynn of Achonry. On 1 May 1982, he succeeded to the position of Bishop of Clonfert and spent much time visiting the scattered small communities that make up much of the diocese. His was an energetic and relatively youthful bishop and soon became media spokesperson for the Irish Episcopal Conference. This role built on his talent for language and communication which was an attribute picked up at his Requiem Mass by his successor "he used language with care, with discrimination and with feeling. He loved to play on words and to pun. His homilies were not only education but entertainment. His language was fresh, his vision poetic."

On 22 August 1987 he was appointed to the position of archbishop of the Archdiocese of Tuam.

He resigned the position on 29 June 1994 and took the title Archbishop Emeritus of Tuam. but he was anxious to maintain his pastoral ministry and became Parish Priest of Moore.

Following his death at home in Ballinasloe on 31 January 2013, his funeral was held in the Cathedral of the Assumption of the Blessed Virgin Mary, Tuam and he was buried at Moore, County Roscommon where he served after his retirement as Archbishop.

Catholic Church titles
Preceded by Joseph Cunnane	Archbishop of Tuam; 22 August 1987–28 June 1994	Succeeded by Michael Neary
