= Tomás Ó Conchúir =

Irish bishop (1755-1803)

The Most Reverend Tomás Ó Conchúir
- Bishop of Achonry
- Church: Roman Catholic
- Diocese: Achonry
- Predecessor: Boetius Egan
- Successor: Charles Lynagh

Personal details
- Born: 1755
- Died: 18 February, 1803 (aged 47–48)

Tomás Ó Conchúir (1755 – 18 February 1803) was a bishop of Achonry in County Sligo, Ireland.

A son of Dermot Ó Conchúir of Woodquay, Tuam, and Mable O'Flynn of Torlagh, County Roscommon, he was a great-grandson of Captain Dermot Ó Conchúir, who served in Colonel Dominick Browne's regiment of Infantry (killed at the Second Siege of Limerick, 1691).

Ó Conchúir was educated on the continent and consecrated Bishop Achonry on 4 January 1788. While his mother's family were from the diocese, he himself did not reside there. On the death of his brother, he became heir to the family property and resided at the family home in Sylane, four miles from Tuam.
