= 1959 Hogan Cup =

Sports event in Ireland

- Dates: 22 March – 19 April 1959
- Teams: 4
- Champions: St Joseph's CBS (1st title); Des Ferguson (captain)
- Runners-up: St Nathy's College; Batty McLaughlin (captain)

Tournament statistics
- Matches played: 3
- Goals scored: 9 (3 per match)
- Points scored: 48 (16 per match)

The 1959 Hogan Cup was the sixth staging of the Hogan Cup since its establishment by the Gaelic Athletic Association in 1946. The competition ran from 22 March to 19 April 1959.

St Jarlath's College were the defending champions, however, they were beaten in the Connacht Championship.

The final was played on 19 April 1959 at Croke Park in Dublin, between St Joseph's CBS and St Nathy's College, in what was their first ever meeting in the final. St Joseph's CBS won the match by 3–09 to 2–08 to claim their only Hogan Cup title.

== Qualification ==
Province	Champions
Connacht	St Nathy's College
Leinster	St Joseph's CBS
Munster	St Flannan's College
Ulster	Abbey CBS

== Results ==
=== Semi-finals ===
22 March 1959 Semi-final	St Nathy's College	2-10 - 1-07	Abbey CBS	Markievicz Park

22 March 1959 Semi-final	St Joseph's CBS	1-07 - 0-07	St Flannan's College	St Cronan's Park

=== Final ===
19 April 1959 Final	St Joseph's CBS	3-09 - 2-08	St Nathy's College	Croke Park
