= Michael Neary (bishop) =

Irish former Roman Catholic prelate (born 1946)

The Most Reverend, Dr. Michael Neary HDip D.D. KC*HS
- Archbishop Emeritus of Tuam
- Church: Roman Catholic
- Archdiocese: Tuam
- Appointed: 17 January 1995
- Installed: 5 March 1995
- Term ended: 10 November 2021
- Predecessor: Joseph Cassidy
- Successor: Francis Duffy
- Other posts: Member of the Dicastery for Divine Worship and the Discipline of the Sacraments; President of Action Tuam; Patron of the Catholic Grandparents Association; Chair of the Council for Doctrine and the Theological Committee of the Irish Catholic Bishops' Conference
- Previous posts: Auxiliary bishop of Tuam; Titular bishop of Quaestoriana; Professor and Lecturer at St Patrick's College, Maynooth; Spiritual director at the Pontifical Irish College; Teacher at Holy Rosary College and Presentation College Headford

Orders
- Ordination: 15 June 1971 by Joseph Cunnane
- Consecration: 13 September 1992 by Joseph Cassidy

Personal details
- Born: 16 April 1946 (age 80) Castlebar, County Mayo, Ireland
- Motto: Fidelis et misericordis (Faithful and merciful)
- Coat of arms

Michael Neary KC*HS (born 15 April 1946) is an Irish prelate in the Catholic Church who served as Archbishop of Tuam between 1995 and 2021.

== Early life and education ==
Neary was born in Castlebar, County Mayo on 15 April 1946, and grew up in the Blackfort area of the town. He attended primary school at St Patrick's Boys National School, Castlebar and secondary school at St Jarlath's College, Tuam, before studying for the priesthood at St. Patrick's College, Maynooth, completing a Bachelor of Arts in philosophy and a Bachelor of Divinity.

Neary was ordained to the priesthood for the Archdiocese of Tuam on 15 June 1971.

== Presbyteral ministry ==
Following ordination, Neary completed a Doctorate of Divinity in 1975, before returning to the Archdiocese of Tuam for his first pastoral appointment, as curate in Belclare, during which time he completed a higher diploma in education from University College Galway. The following year, he was appointed teacher at Presentation College Headford.

Neary undertook further postgraduate studies at the Pontifical Biblical Institute, Rome, between 1978 and 1981, completing a licentiate in sacred scripture. It was during this time that he also served as spiritual director at the Pontifical Irish College. Neary returned to the Archdiocese of Tuam in 1981, where he was appointed teacher at Holy Rosary College, Mountbellew, during which time he also served as curate in Moylough.

The following year, Neary was appointed lecturer in sacred scripture at St Patrick's College, Maynooth, and subsequently professor of New Testament theology in 1991.

== Episcopal ministry ==
=== Auxiliary Bishop of Tuam ===
Styles of Michael Neary
- Reference style: The Most Reverend
- Spoken style: Your Grace
- Religious style: Archbishop

Neary was appointed auxiliary bishop of Tuam and titular bishop of Quaestoriana by Pope John Paul II on 20 May 1992. He was consecrated by the Archbishop of Tuam, Joseph Cassidy, on 13 September in the Sanctuary of Our Lady of Knock, Knock.

=== Archbishop of Tuam ===
Following Cassidy's resignation on health grounds on 28 June 1994, Neary was appointed Archbishop of Tuam by Pope John Paul II on 17 January 1995, and subsequently installed on 5 March in the Cathedral of the Assumption of the Blessed Virgin Mary, Tuam.

Within the Irish Catholic Bishops' Conference, he chaired the Council for Doctrine and the Theological Committee. He also served as patron of the Catholic Grandparents Association and the president of Action Tuam.

Neary was appointed by Pope Benedict XVI as a member of the Dicastery for Divine Worship and the Discipline of the Sacraments on 6 July 2010.

==== Clerical sexual abuse ====
In a statement on 21 May 2009, Neary described the Ryan Report as "sad and disturbing reading", and offered on behalf of the Catholic Church his unreserved apologies "for our failure to protect children".

He added that had lay people been more involved in the Church, the response to clerical child sex abuse allegations "would have been different". In a letter to the priests of the Archdiocese of Tuam following a meeting held between Pope Benedict XVI and Irish bishops from 15 to 16 February 2010, Neary said that "in the discussions [Pope Benedict XVI] asked for the forgiveness of the victims", adding that "the need for co-operation with civil authorities, the HSE and Gardaí, and the complete implementation of the Church’s own norms and procedures were seen as central to the safeguarding of children".

He also acknowledged that while the problem of clerical sexual abuse was not one "which is peculiar to Ireland or to the English-speaking world, or the church, nevertheless its impact is intensified in the church, damaging its credibility in a number of areas, for example, its teaching on marriage and the family, on sexual morality, and on the church’s role in education and Catholic schools".

In a homily given on Reek Sunday 2010, Neary said that "the truth of past pain is certainly coming to the surface. But this is good news. We should embrace the truth even though this can be a painful task". However, he also asked for awareness "of the dangers contained in what some have called a 'culture of blame'. We seek out the negligence of doctors, the health service, bankers, the Church or the school. Maybe this makes it easier to deal with our own shortcomings, the neglect and indifference of others and the tyranny of blind chance. Christ did not encourage us to imprison people by their human failings. Instead he taught us the way of forgiveness."

===== Apostolic visitation =====
On 6 October 2010, Neary, along with the Archbishops of Armagh, Cashel and Emly and Dublin, engaged in high-level talks with heads of Vatican congregations over the organisation of an apostolic visitation to Ireland, in the wake of the Murphy and Ryan reports. While in Rome, the four archbishops met the four apostolic visitors appointed by Pope Benedict to examine the four Irish archdioceses and "some other as yet unspecified dioceses":

- the Archbishop Emeritus of Westminster, Cormac Murphy-O'Connor, who visited the Archdiocese of Armagh
- the Archbishop of Boston, Seán O'Malley, who visited the Archdiocese of Dublin
- the Archbishop of Toronto, Thomas Christopher Collins, who investigated the Archdiocese of Cashel
- and the Archbishop of Ottawa, Terrence Prendergast, who investigated the Archdiocese of Tuam

The state of Irish seminaries was investigation by the Archbishop of New York, Timothy M. Dolan.

===== Child protection =====
Neary was praised for his actions in a review into the handling of clerical sexual abuse allegations in the Archdiocese of Tuam that published on 30 November 2011. The report stated that while serious harm was done to children by a few priests of the archdiocese, Neary met allegations "with a steadily serious approach, taking appropriate action under existing guidelines, and rapidly assimilating the lesson of the necessity for the removal of the priest, where there is a credible allegation, pending investigation".

The report also stated that it is clear from the "excellent records" that a genuine effort was made to gather evidence from victims and their families during the Church inquiry stage and such "thoroughness is to be commended". The report added that "[it was] also a fair reflection to say that the archbishop has met resistance in asking a priest to step aside from public ministry", and that it was "to his credit that in spite of opposition, [Neary] has maintained his authority and kept some men out of ministry where there is evidence to suggest that they should be viewed as dangerous and should not have access to young people."

Neary called the report "an enormous tribute to all working in this area", added that it was "very encouraging to see that their work has been recognised, affirmed and appreciated in the report".

==== Association of Papal Knights homily ====
In a 2014 homily, Neary said, "Our priests tell me of measurably declining congregations and a steady, if still quite gentle, dropping in contributions. They see few teenagers in their churches. They feel, intuitively, that the temporary lapsing noticeable here from about the seventies is changing. They fear that those falling away in recent years will not return...Even the outright hostility we had been experiencing from sections of the media, the political establishment and some of the public has curiously abated. This, if I am right, is not because the depth of our piety and the brilliance of our arguments have made them think again. This is because the whole society...is tacitly acknowledging something that hardly needs to be said. That a great struggle, social, political, intellectual and profoundly cultural, has been fought. And that we have lost".

==== Bon Secours mother and baby home ====
In a homily given on 5 March 2017, Neary expressed his upset at the publication of the findings of the Mother and Baby Homes Commission of Investigation two days earlier, adding that he was also "greatly shocked [...] to learn of the extent of the numbers of children buried in the graveyard at the Mother and Baby Home in Tuam" and describing the news as a "body blow". On 12 March, he expressed "an urgent need for an enquiry to examine all aspects of life at the time, broadening the focus from one particular religious congregation, and instead addressing the roles and interrelationships between Church, State, local authorities and society generally", and hoped "that the Report of the Commission will enable that truth to surface in a clear and objective manner".

In a statement welcoming the publication of the final report of the Mother and Baby Homes Commission of Investigation on 13 January 2021, Neary referred to the findings as "a cause for shame", acknowledging that the Church "failed in its responsibility to love and cherish those who were thus diminished" and that when "the Church is not serving with compassion, it is failing". He went on to acknowledge and humbly ask "forgiveness for the abject failure of the Church for the pain and suffering visited on those women and their children in the Mother and Baby Homes nationally".

== Retirement ==
In accordance with Canon law, Archbishop Neary submitted his episcopal resignation to the Dicastery for Bishops on his 75th birthday on 15 April 2021, but was expected to remain in the see until a successor was appointed.

He subsequently remained in the see until the appointment of his successor, Francis Duffy, on 10 November 2021.

Neary currently resides in Castlebar, County Mayo.

Catholic Church titles
Preceded by Joseph Cassidy	Archbishop of Tuam; 1995–2021	Succeeded by Francis Duffy
