= Joseph Walsh (bishop) =

Irish clergyman

- Archbishop of Tuam
- Church: Catholic Church
- Archdiocese: Archdiocese of Tuam
- In office: 16 January 1940 – 31 January 1969
- Predecessor: Thomas Gilmartin
- Successor: Joseph Cunnane
- Other post: Titular Archbishop of Tubernuca (1969-1972)
- Previous posts: Titular Bishop of Coela (1937-1940); Auxiliary Bishop of Tuam (1937-1940)

Orders
- Ordination: 21 June 1914
- Consecration: 2 January 1938 by Thomas Gilmartin

Personal details
- Born: 24 December 1888 Newport, County Mayo, United Kingdom of Great Britain and Ireland
- Died: 20 June 1972 (aged 83)

Styles of Joseph Walsh
- Reference style: The Most Reverend
- Spoken style: Your Grace or Archbishop

Joseph Walsh (1888–1972) was an Irish clergyman of the Roman Catholic Church. He served as Archbishop of Tuam from 1940 to 1969.

Born on 24 December 1888 in Newport, Ireland, he was ordained to the priesthood on 21 June 1914. He was appointed an Auxiliary Bishop of the Archdiocese of Tuam and Titular Bishop of Coela on 16 December 1937. His episcopal consecration took place on 2 January 1938. Two years later, he was appointed Archbishop of Tuam on 16 January 1940. He participated in all the four sessions of the Second Vatican Council, held between in 1962 and 1965.

After 29 years, he resigned on 31 January 1969 and was appointed Titular Archbishop of Tubernuca. He resigned the titular position in 1971, and died on 20 June 1972, aged 83.

== Controversy ==
During his 29 years as first auxiliary bishop and later archbishop of Tuam between 1937 and 1969, hundreds of children were trafficked, neglected and mistreated in the Bon Secours Mother and Baby Home, with mass graves directly linked to these institutions being uncovered in the early 2010s.

== Bibliography ==
- Fryde, E. B.; Greenway, D. E.; Porter, S.; Roy, I., eds. (1986). Handbook of British Chronology (3rd, reprinted 2003 ed.). Cambridge: Cambridge University Press. ISBN 0-521-56350-X.

Catholic Church titles
New title	Titular Bishop of Coela; 1937–1940	Succeeded by George Joseph Donnelly
Preceded by Thomas Gilmartin	Archbishop of Tuam; 1940–1969	Succeeded by Joseph Cunnane
New title	Titular Archbishop of Tubernuca; 1969–1971	Succeeded by Alberto Iniesta Jiménez
