= Philip Phillips (bishop) =

Archbishop of Tuam (fl. 1760–1787)

- Archbishop of Tuam
- Church: Catholic Church
- Archdiocese: Archdiocese of Tuam
- In office: 22 November 1785 – September 1787
- Predecessor: Michael Skerrett
- Successor: Boetius Egan
- Previous posts: Bishop of Achonry (1776-1785); Bishop of Killala (1760-1776)

Orders
- Ordination: 1742
- Consecration: 1761

Personal details
- Died: September 1787

Styles of Philip Phillips
- Reference style: The Most Reverend
- Spoken style: Your Grace or Archbishop

Philip Phillips (died 1787) was an Irish clergyman of the Roman Catholic Church. He served as Archbishop of Tuam from 1785 to 1787.

He was appointed Bishop of Killala on 24 November 1760, and translated to the bishopric of Achonry on 22 November 1785. He was translated again to the archbishopric of Tuam on 22 November 1785. He died in office in September 1787.

Catholic Church titles
Preceded by Bonaventura MacDonnell	Bishop of Killala; 1760–1776	Succeeded by Alexander Irwin
Preceded by Patrick Robert Kirwan	Bishop of Achonry; 1776–1785	Succeeded by Boetius Egan
Preceded by Michael Skerrett	Archbishop of Tuam; 1785–1787	Succeeded by Boetius Egan
