= Paul Dempsey (bishop) =

Irish prelate (born 1971)

The Most Reverend Paul Dempsey MTh
- Auxiliary Bishop of Dublin; Titular Bishop of Sita
- Church: Roman Catholic
- Archdiocese: Dublin
- See: Sita
- Appointed: 10 April 2024
- Predecessor: Raymond Field and Éamonn Walsh (Dublin); Udo Bentz (Sita)
- Previous posts: Bishop of Achonry; Parish priest of Newbridge; Vicar forane of the North deanery Diocesan youth director and director of vocations for the Diocese of Kildare and Leighlin

Orders
- Ordination: 6 July 1997 by Laurence Ryan
- Consecration: 30 August 2020 by Michael Neary

Personal details
- Born: 20 April 1971 (age 55) Carlow, County Carlow, Ireland
- Parents: Tony and Berry Dempsey
- Education: Milltown Institute; St. Patrick's, Carlow College; All Hallows College
- Motto: Duc in altum (Put out into the deep)
- Coat of arms

Styles of Paul Dempsey
- Reference style: The Most Reverend
- Spoken style: Your Grace
- Religious style: Bishop

Paul Dempsey (born 20 April 1971) is an Irish Roman Catholic prelate who has served as auxiliary bishop of Dublin and titular bishop of Sita since 2024.

== Early life and education ==
Dempsey was born in Carlow on 20 April 1971, the youngest of four children to Tony and Berry Dempsey. He moved with his family to Athy, County Kildare, in 1978, where he attended the local Christian Brothers primary school and secondary school at the local Christian Brothers secondary school, Scoil Eoin.

Dempsey studied for the priesthood in Milltown Institute, St Patrick's, Carlow College and All Hallows College.

He was ordained a priest for the Diocese of Kildare and Leighlin on 6 July 1997.

== Presbyteral ministry ==
Following ordination, Dempsey's first pastoral appointment was as a curate in Clane and Rathcoffey. Seven years later, he was appointed curate in Kildare, and simultaneously as diocesan youth director and director of vocations. During his time as diocesan youth director, Dempsey organised two World Youth Day pilgrimages in 2005 and 2008. It was during his curacy in Kildare that he also started writing a weekly article in the Leinster Leader and presenting Religion Matters, a religious and social affairs program on Kfm.

Dempsey returned to the Milltown Institute for further studies, completing a master's degree in theology in 2008. His thesis examined whether the Catholic Church in contemporary Ireland was a church in crisis or one in question.

Dempsey was appointed to the parish cluster of Naas, Sallins and Two Mile House in 2009, before moving to Newbridge in August 2014, when he was also appointed vicar forane for the North deanery. The following year, Dempsey was appointed parish priest in Newbridge and simultaneously administrator in Caragh and Prosperous.

In a December 2010 article for The Furrow on being a priest in modern Ireland, Dempsey wrote that "the Church community needs to enter into a period of deep reflection", adding that it would be "refreshing to see some leadership around this 'reflection' culminating in some form of national Church gathering", and noting his awareness of major issues in the church, such as the role of women and the appointment of bishops.

== Episcopal ministry ==
=== Bishop of Achonry ===
Dempsey was appointed Bishop-elect of Achonry by Pope Francis on 27 January 2020, the first Carlow-born bishop to be appointed since Michael Comerford as coadjutor bishop of Kildare and Leighlin in 1888.

His episcopal ordination was initially scheduled to take place on 19 April, but was rescheduled on 17 June due to the COVID-19 pandemic. Dempsey was eventually consecrated by the Archbishop of Tuam, Michael Neary, on 30 August in the Cathedral of the Annunciation of the Blessed Virgin Mary and St Nathy, Ballaghaderreen.

In response to a document published by the Congregation for the Doctrine of the Faith in March 2021, Dempsey released a statement on 26 March 2021 in which he referred to language in the document banning blessings for same-sex couples as "hurtful".

In his Lenten pastoral letter in 2023, he expressed his concerns about falling vocations to the priesthood, revealing that there hadn't been an ordination in the diocese since 2013, and no more than twelve priests would be serving in the Diocese of Achonry in ten years' time.

=== Auxiliary Bishop of Dublin ===
In response to a wider reorganisation of diocesan church leadership in the ecclesiastical province of Tuam, Dempsey was appointed auxiliary bishop of Dublin and titular bishop of Sita by Pope Francis on 10 April 2024. The Bishop of Elphin, Kevin Doran, was subsequently appointed as apostolic administrator sede vacante of the Diocese of Achonry.
