= 1958 Hogan Cup =

- Dates: 31 March – 27 April 1958
- Teams: 4
- Champions: St Jarlath's College (2nd title)
- Runners-up: Franciscan College

Tournament statistics
- Matches played: 3
- Goals scored: 8 (2.67 per match)
- Points scored: 39 (13 per match)

The 1958 Hogan Cup was the fifth staging of the Hogan Cup since its establishment by the Gaelic Athletic Association in 1946. The competition ran from 31 March to 27 April 1958.

St Nathy's College were the defending champions, however, they were beaten in the Connacht Championship.

The final was played on 27 April 1958 at Croke Park in Dublin, between St Jarlath's College and Franciscan College, in what was their first ever meeting in the final. St Jarlath's College won the match by 1–07 to 2–03 to claim their second Hogan Cup title overall and a first title in 11 years.

== Qualification ==
Province	Champions
Connacht	St Jarlath's College
Leinster	Franciscan College
Munster	De La Salle College Waterford
Ulster	St Colman's College

== Results ==
=== Semi-finals ===
30 March 1958 Semi-final	Franciscan College	3-07 - 1-09	St Colman's College	Croke Park

30 March 1958 Semi-final	St Jarlath's College	0-09 - 1-04	De La Salle College Waterford	Tuam Stadium

=== Final ===
27 April 1958 Final	St Jarlath's College	1-07 - 2-03	Franciscan College	Croke Park
