= James Lynch (archbishop of Tuam) =

Archbishop of Tuam; Irish Roman Catholic bishop

- Archbishop of Tuam
- Church: Catholic Church
- Archdiocese: Archdiocese of Tuam
- In office: 8 March 1669 – 31 October 1713
- Predecessor: John de Burgh
- Successor: Francis Burke

Orders
- Consecration: 26 May 1669 by Eugeen Albert d'Allamont

Personal details
- Born: 1623 Galway, County Galway, Kingdom of Ireland, British Empire
- Died: 31 October 1713 (aged 89–90) Paris, Kingdom of France

James Lynch (c. 1623 – 31 October 1713) was an Irish Roman Catholic clergyman who served as Archbishop of Tuam from 1669 to 1713.

Born about 1623 in Galway city, he was appointed Archbishop of Tuam on 8 March 1669 and consecrated at Ghent on 16 May 1669. His principal consecrator was Eugenius Albertus d'Allamont, Bishop of Ghent, and his principal co-consecrators were Peter Talbot, Archbishop of Dublin and Nicholas French, Bishop of Ferns. It was not until 1671 that he was granted the pallium. Back in Ireland, he got on well with the civil authorities and was allowed to preach and teach. However, in 1674, he was arrested and compelled to go into exile. He died in office in Paris on 31 October 1713, aged 87 years old.

Catholic Church titles
| Preceded by John de Burgh | Archbishop of Tuam; 1669–1713 | Succeeded by Francis Burke |
