= Oliver Kelly =

Irish clergyman

- Archbishop of Tuam
- Church: Catholic Church
- Archdiocese: Archdiocese of Tuam
- In office: 4 October 1814 – 18 April 1834
- Predecessor: Edward Dillon
- Successor: John MacHale

Orders
- Ordination: 1800
- Consecration: 12 March 1815 by John Troy

Personal details
- Born: 1777 Curraghmore (near Ballinasloe), County Galway, Kingdom of Ireland
- Died: 18 April 1834 (aged 56–57) Albano Laziale, Papal States

Styles of Oliver Kelly
- Reference style: The Most Reverend
- Spoken style: Your Grace or Archbishop

Oliver Kelly or O'Kelly (1777–1834) was an Irish clergyman of the Roman Catholic Church who served as the Archbishop of Tuam from 1815 to 1834.

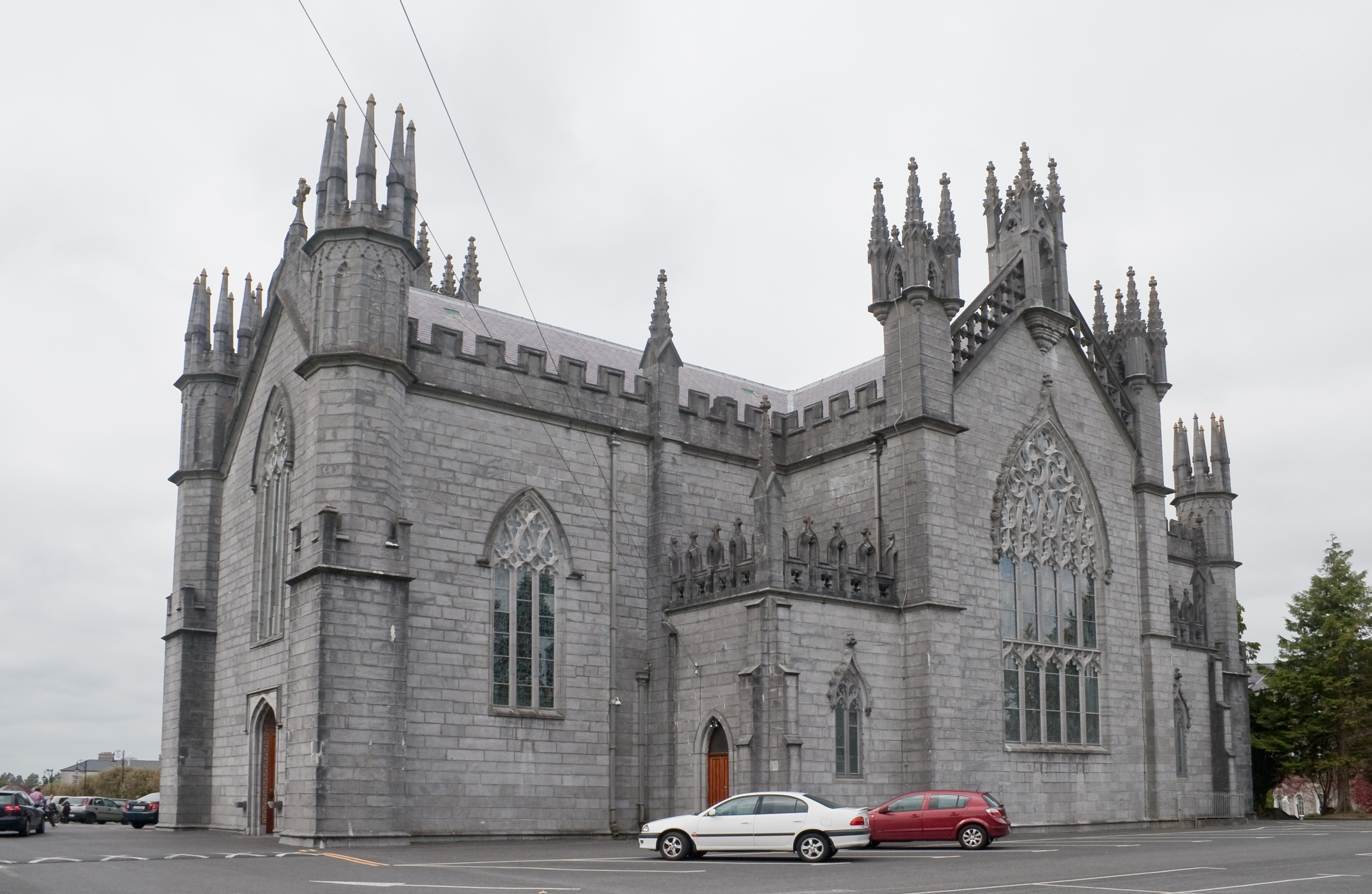
Tuam Cathedral, for whose building Archbishop Kelly was responsible.

Born in 1777 in Curraghmore, near Ballinasloe in County Galway, educated at Lawrence Duffy's School (Peterswell), going to the Irish College at Salamanca to study for the priesthood in 1795, he was ordained to the priesthood in 1800. He was the Vicar Capitular of the Archdiocese of Tuam, before being appointed Archbishop of Tuam by papal brief on 4 October 1814. He was consecrated on 12 March 1815 by the Most Reverend John Thomas Troy, Archbishop of Dublin, with the Most Reverend Daniel Murray, Coadjutor Archbishop of Dublin and the Most Reverend Kyran Marum, Bishop of Ossory, serving as co-consecrators. He was responsible for the building of the Cathedral Church of the Assumption of the Blessed Virgin Mary, Tuam.

He died in office at Albano Laziale on 18 April 1834, aged 57, and was buried at the Sacred Congregation for the Propagation of the Faith in Rome. His sister Mary Kelly married and moved to the United States; two of her sons became priests, and one of her daughters, Euphemia Blenkinsop, became Mother Superior of the Sisters of Charity in Emmitsburg, Maryland.

Catholic Church titles
Preceded by Edward Dillon	Archbishop of Tuam; 1815–1834	Succeeded by John MacHale
