= James Fergus (bishop) =

James Fergus (23 December 1895 – 24 March 1989) was an Irish Roman Catholic clergyman who served as Bishop of Achonry from 1947 to 1976.

Fergus was born in Louisburgh, County Mayo. He was ordained in 1920 and began his career with a curacy at Glenamaddy. After that he was Secretary to Thomas Gilmartin (Archbishop of Tuam from 1918 to 1939). He was Parish Priest at Ballinrobe until his consecration as bishop.

Catholic Church titles
Preceded by Patrick Morrisroe	Bishop of Achonry; 1947–1976	Succeeded by Thomas Flynn
