= Michael O'Gara =

Roman Catholic Archbishop of Tuam, Ireland

- Archbishop of Tuam
- Church: Catholic Church
- Archdiocese: Archdiocese of Tuam
- In office: 19 September 1740 – 1748
- Predecessor: Bernard O'Gara
- Successor: Michael Skerrett

Personal details
- Died: c. 1748

Styles of Michael O'Gara
- Reference style: The Most Reverend
- Spoken style: Your Grace or Archbishop

Michael O'Gara (died 1748) was an Irish clergyman who served as the Roman Catholic Archbishop of Tuam from 1740 to 1748.

== Biography ==
O'Gara trained as a priest at the Irish College at Alcalá de Henares, in Spain. He was appointed archbishop of the metropolitan see of Tuam by papal brief on 19 September 1740, and received faculties as bishop later in the same month. He received dispensation to exercise all the archiepiscopal acts without the Pallium on 28 November 1741.

He died in office in 1748.

== See also ==
Bernard O'Gara - Brother, Archbishop of Tuam from 1723 to 1740

Catholic Church titles
Preceded by Bernard O'Gara	Archbishop of Tuam; 1740–1748	Succeeded by Michael Skerrett
