= Patrick MacNicholas =

Irish Roman Bishop

Patrick MacNicholas (1780 – 1852) was an Irish Roman Catholic clergyman who served as Bishop of Achonry from 1818 until his death.

MacNicholas was ordained in 1804. He was buried at the Old Cemetery, Ballaghaderreen but then re-interred at St Nathy's.

Catholic Church titles
Preceded by John O'Flynn	Bishop of Achonry; 1818–1852	Succeeded by Patrick Durcan
