= Michael Skerrett =

Irish clergyman

- Archbishop of Tuam
- Church: Catholic Church
- Archdiocese: Archdiocese of Tuam
- In office: 5 May 1749 – 19 August 1785
- Predecessor: Michael O'Gara
- Successor: Philip Phillips
- Previous post: Bishop of Killala (1749)

Orders
- Consecration: 1749

Personal details
- Died: 19 August 1785

Styles of Michael Skerrett
- Reference style: The Most Reverend
- Spoken style: Your Grace or Archbishop

Michael Skerrett (died 1785) was an Irish clergyman of the Roman Catholic Church. He served as Archbishop of Tuam from 1749 to 1785.

He was appointed Bishop of Killala on 23 January 1749, but was quickly translated to the archbishopric of Tuam on 5 May 1749. He died in office on 19 August 1785.

He was a descendant of the Tribes of Galway.

Catholic Church titles
Preceded by John Brett	Bishop of Killala; 1749	Succeeded by Bonaventura MacDonnell
Preceded by Michael O'Gara	Archbishop of Tuam; 1749–1785	Succeeded by Philip Phillips
