= John Lyster =

Irish Catholic priest (1850–1911)

John Lyster (5 October 1850 – 17 January 1911) was an Irish Roman Catholic clergyman who served as Bishop of Achonry from 1888 to until his death.

Lyster was born in Athlone. He was educated at St Joseph's College, Athlone and St Patrick's College, Maynooth; and ordained in 1872. He was also Principal of Summerhill College.

Catholic Church titles
Preceded by Francis McCormack	Bishop of Achonry; 1888–1911	Succeeded by Patrick Morrisroe
