= Paul Dempsey (disambiguation) =

Paul Dempsey (born 1976) is an Australian musician and the lead vocalist of Something for Kate.

Paul Dempsey may also refer to:

- Paul Dempsey (bishop) (born 1971), Irish prelate and the incumbent bishop of Achonry
- Paul Dempsey (presenter) (born 1960), British TV and radio sports presenter and commentator
