= Patrick Durcan (bishop) =

Roman Catholic bishop

Right Reverend Patrick Durcan
- Bishop of Achonry
- Church: Roman Catholic Church
- Diocese: Achonry
- Installed: 30 October 1852
- Term ended: 1 May 1875

Orders
- Ordination: 21 May 1820
- Consecration: 30 November 1852 by Archbishop John MacHale

Personal details
- Born: 5 February 1790 Kilmactigue, Ireland
- Died: 1 May 1875 (aged 85)
- Education: St Patrick's College, Maynooth (DD)

Patrick Durcan (5 February 1790 – 1 May 1875) was an Irish Roman Catholic clergyman who served as Bishop of Achonry from 1852 until his death. The son of John and Mary Durcan (née Rowan), he helped to translate the Vulgate into the English language, published in 1857.

He was educated at St Patrick's College, Maynooth. In 1832 he became parish priest at Collooney. He is buried at the Cathedral of the Annunciation of the Blessed Virgin Mary and St Nathy, Ballaghaderreen.

Catholic Church titles
Preceded by Patrick MacNicholas	Bishop of Achonry; 1852–1875	Succeeded by Francis McCormack
