= Edward Dillon (bishop) =

Irish clergyman

- Archbishop of Tuam
- Church: Catholic Church
- Archdiocese: Archdiocese of Tuam
- In office: 17 November 1798 – 30 August 1809
- Predecessor: Boetius Egan
- Successor: Oliver Kelly
- Previous posts: Apostolic Administrator of Diocese of Kilfenora & Bishop of Kilmacduagh (1795-1798); Titular Bishop of Germanicia (1794-1795); Coadjutor Bishop of Kilmacduagh (1794-1795)

Orders
- Consecration: 18 May 1794 by Boetius Egan

Personal details
- Born: 1739 Caltra, County Galway, Kingdom of Ireland
- Died: 30 August 1809 (aged 69–70)

Styles of Edward Dillon
- Reference style: The Most Reverend
- Spoken style: Your Grace or Archbishop

Edward Dillon (1739–1809) was an Irish clergyman who served as a Roman Catholic prelate in Ireland during the late 18th and early 19th centuries.

Dillon was born at Caltra, Ballinasloe, County Galway. He was educated in France, becoming Superior of Irish College, Douai. Towards the end of 1791 the civil oath was demanded of the clergy. On 18 December 1791 Dillon presented a petition to the local revolutionary committee acknowledging French generosity but denying charges of partiality towards the royalist faction. This resulted in the exemption from the oath been granted to the Irish college.

War between France and the Great Britain in 1793 brought an end to the immunity and the closure of the college. Dillon returned to Ireland and appointed coadjutor bishop of the diocese of Kilmacduagh and Kilfenora on 21 January 1794, and the following year succeeded as the diocesan Bishop of Kilmacduagh and Kilfenora on 29 June 1795. He subsequently became Archbishop of Tuam on 19 November 1798. He was unpopular with both his flock and the ruling class; the former for his denouncements of the United Irishmen and the French revolution. He died in office on 13 or 30 August 1809.

Catholic Church titles
Preceded by Laurence Nihil	Bishop of Kilmacduagh and Kilfenora; 1795–1798	Succeeded by Nicholas Archdeacon
Preceded by Boetius Egan	Archbishop of Tuam; 1798–1809	Succeeded by Oliver Kelly
