= 1957 Hogan Cup =

- Dates: 31 March – 14 April 1957
- Teams: 4
- Champions: St Nathy's College (1st title)
- Runners-up: St Colman's College

Tournament statistics
- Matches played: 3
- Goals scored: 10 (3.33 per match)
- Points scored: 30 (10 per match)

The 1957 Hogan Cup was the fourth staging of the Hogan Cup since its establishment by the Gaelic Athletic Association in 1946. The competition ran from 31 March to 14 April 1957. It was the first competition to be completed since 1948.

St Mel's College were the defending champions, however, they were beaten in the Connacht Championship.

The final was played on 14 April 1957 at Croke Park in Dublin, between St Nathy's College and St Colman's College, in what was their first ever meeting in the final. St Nathy's College won the match by 1–07 to 0–04 to claim their first ever Hogan Cup title.

== Qualification ==
Province	Champions
Connacht	St Nathy's College
Leinster	Patrician College
Munster	Coláiste Íosagáin
Ulster	St Colman's College

== Results ==
=== Semi-finals ===
31 March 1957 Semi-final	St Colman's College	5-04 - 1-04	Patrician College	Páirc Tailteann

31 March 1957 Semi-final	St Nathy's College	3-07 - 0-04	Coláiste Íosagáin	FitzGerald Stadium

=== Final ===
14 April 1957 Final	St Nathy's College	1-07 - 0-04	St Colman's College	Croke Park
