= Walter Lynch =

Walter Lynch may refer to:

- Walter Lynch (footballer) (1896–?), English footballer
- Walter Lynch (mayor), mayor of Galway
- Walter Lynch (bishop), Irish prelate
- Walter A. Lynch (1894–1957), American politician from New York
- Walt Lynch (1897–1976), backup catcher in Major League Baseball
