= Tuam Cathedral =

Tuam Cathedral can refer to either of the two cathedrals in Tuam:

- Cathedral of the Assumption of the Blessed Virgin Mary, Tuam, belonging to the Roman Catholic Church
- St Mary's Cathedral, Tuam, belonging to the Church of Ireland
