= John de Burgh (bishop) =

Irish Roman Catholic cleric and Archbishop of Tuam (1590–1667)

The Most Reverend John de Burgh
- Church: Roman Catholic Church
- Archdiocese: Archbishop of Tuam
- In office: 1647–1667
- Other posts: Vicar Apostolic (1629–41); Bishop of Clonfert (1642–47)

Orders
- Consecration: 9 April 1642

Personal details
- Born: John de Burgh; 1590
- Died: April 4, 1667 (aged 76–77)
- Buried: Oratory of St. Jarlath

John de Burgh (English: /dəˈbɜːr/ də-BUR; 1590 – 4 April 1667), or de Burgo or Burke, was an Irish Roman Catholic clergyman who served as Vicar Apostolic (1629–41) and Bishop of Clonfert (1642–47), and Archbishop of Tuam (1647–67).

== Background ==
John de Burgh was a member of the Clanricarde de Burgh or Burke family of County Galway (the surname was latinised as de Burgo and gaelicised as de Búrca, or Búrc, later Burke). He and his brother Hugh were taught by a member of the Ó Maolconaire family, from whom they learned very considerable Greek and Latin. John and Hugh left for the continent in 1614, John to Lisbon, Hugh to Louvain where he joined the Franciscans.

== Career ==
John de Burgh was ordained a priest and returned to Ireland around 1624, working for two years in the Diocese of Tuam under Boetius Egan. In 1627, on Egan's recommendation, he was appointed Apostolic Vicar of the Diocese of Clonfert by a papal brief on 13 October 1629.

During the projected Plantation of Connacht in the 1630s, his influence on Catholic members of the 1634 Parliament was so great that Lord Stafford issued warrants for his arrest, necessitating de Burgh hiding until the Viceroy's recall. On the recommendation of Bishop MacEgan of Elphin, he was appointed to Bishop of Clonfert on 16 October 1641, and consecrated on 9 April 1642. He subscribed to the ordinances agreed upon for the war against Parliament, spending almost all of his time in Kilkenny assisting the seventy-two-year-old David Rothe. During these years, Hugh de Burgh was agent for the Supreme Council at the Court of the Netherlands.

Upon the death of Malachias O'Queely, he was appointed Archbishop of Tuam by the Supreme Council of the Catholic Confederation of Ireland on 11 March 1647. On the same date he became archbishop, his brother, Hugh, was appointed Bishop of Kilmacduagh. He was noted as a good administrator of his dioceses, reforming many deep abuses, had churches repaired and established schools. In matters of policy, he was akin to his kinsman, Ulick Burke, 1st Marquess of Clanricarde. He became known for founding an extensive library in Tuam, which is thought was used by the likes of John Lynch and Dubhaltach Mac Fhirbhisigh. He also advanced a large sum to the Jesuits to maintain a seminary in Galway, in which town he built himself a residence three stories high.

He came into conflict with Walter Lynch, Vicar-capitular of Tuam, who was the Papal Nuncio's choice for the vacant see of Clonfert; however, de Burgh wanted it for his brother, Hugh. Giovanni Battista Rinuccini described the brothers as "hot-headed, and wishing to have everything their own way ... that it would be unwise to have two brothers collated to the two best dioceses in the province ... that the Archbishop of Tuam was the most unmanageable and refractory of all the Irish prelates with whom he had to deal. He blames me for recommending Lynch, and what is worse, he blames another who is superior to us all."

He died on Holy Thursday, 4 April 1667, and was buried in the Oratory of St. Jarlath.

== See also ==
- House of Burgh, an Anglo-Norman and Hiberno-Norman dynasty founded in 1193
- Catholic Church in Ireland

Catholic Church titles
Preceded by Thady Egan (vicar apostolic)	Bishop of Clonfert; 1641–1647 (Vicar Apostolic 1626–1641)	Succeeded by Walter Lynch (bishop)
Preceded by Malachias O'Queely	Archbishop of Tuam; 1647–1667	Succeeded by James Lynch
