= Bernard O'Gara =

Irish clergyman

- Archbishop of Tuam
- Church: Catholic Church
- Archdiocese: Archdiocese of Tuam
- In office: 23 December 1723 – 1740
- Predecessor: Francis Burke
- Successor: Michael O'Gara

Orders
- Consecration: 24 May 1724 by Gabriel O'Kelly

Personal details
- Died: c. 1740

Styles of Bernard O'Gara
- Reference style: The Most Reverend
- Spoken style: Your Grace or Archbishop

Bernard O'Gara (died 1740) was an Irish clergyman who served as the Roman Catholic Archbishop of Tuam from 1723 to 1740. O'Gara was the grandson of Fearghal Ó Gadhra.

He was selected to be the archbishop of the metropolitan see of Tuam on 14 December 1723, and was confirmed by papal brief on 23 December 1723. He received episcopal ordination at a place of refuge from Bishop Gabriel O'Kelly of Elphin on 24 May 1724. Archbishop O'Gara requested the Pallium, and the dispensing brief was issued in 1726.

He died in office in, or before, June 1740.

== See also ==
- Michael O'Gara - brother, Archbishop of Tuam from 1740 to 1748

Catholic Church titles
Preceded by Francis Burke	Archbishop of Tuam; 1723–1740	Succeeded by Michael O'Gara
