= Francis Burke (bishop) =

Irish Roman Catholic clergyman and Archbishop of Tuam (d.1723)

The Most Reverend Francis de Burgo
- Church: Roman Catholic Church
- Archdiocese: Archbishop of Tuam
- In office: 1713–1723
- Predecessor: James Lynch
- Successor: Bernard O'Gara

Orders
- Consecration: 4 April 1714

Personal details
- Born: Francis Burke
- Died: August or September 1723

Francis Burke, or de Burgo, or de Burgh (died August or September 1723) was an Irish Roman Catholic clergyman who served as Archbishop of Tuam (1713–1723).

== Career ==
Burke was appointed Coadjutor Archbishop of Tuam on 22 August 1713. He had been recommended by John Burke, 9th Earl of Clanricarde, his kinsman. Two months later, he succeeded as Archbishop of Tuam on 31 October 1713, and consecrated on 4 April 1714. He died in office in August or September 1723.

== See also ==
- House of Burgh, an Anglo-Norman and Hiberno-Norman dynasty founded in 1193
- Catholic Church in Ireland

Catholic Church titles
Preceded by James Lynch	Archbishop of Tuam; 1713–1723	Succeeded by Bernard O'Gara
