= 1948 Hogan Cup =

- Dates: 18 April – 2 May 1948
- Teams: 4
- Champions: St Mel's College (1st title); Tom Casey (captain)
- Runners-up: St Patrick's College

Tournament statistics
- Matches played: 3
- Goals scored: 12 (4 per match)
- Points scored: 40 (13.33 per match)

The 1948 Hogan Cup was the third staging of the Hogan Cup since its establishment by the Gaelic Athletic Association in 1946. The competition ran from 18 April to 2 May 1948.

St Jarlath's College were the defending champions, however, they were beaten in the Connacht Championship

The final was played on 2 May 1948 at Croke Park in Dublin, between St Mel's College and St Patrick's College, in what was their first ever meeting in the final. St Mel's College won the match by 4–07 to 3–03 to claim their first ever Hogan Cup title.

== Qualification ==
Province	Champions
Connacht	Roscommon CBS
Leinster	St Mel's College
Munster	Tralee CBS
Ulster	St Patrick's College

== Results ==
=== Semi-finals ===
18 April 1948 Semi-final	St Mel's College	1-07 - 2-02	Tralee CBS	Pearse Park

18 April 1948 Semi-final	St Patrick's College	2-15 - 0-06	Roscommon CBS	Pearse Park

=== Final ===
11 May 1947 Final	St Mel's College	4-07 - 3-03	St Patrick's College	Croke Park
