= Irish College at Alcala =

Former clerical college in Spain

Irish College at Alcalá de Henares
- Spanish: Real Colegio de San Jorge Myrtir de los Irlandeses
- Type: Seminary
- Active: 1649–1785
- Founder: Baron George Sylveira
- Religious affiliation: Roman Catholic
- Academic affiliations: Complutense University; University of Alcalá
- Location: Offices Street, Alacla de Henares; 40.481072°N 3.366458°W

The Irish College of San Jorge at Alcalá de Henares, was founded about 1648, from the estate of Baron George Sylveira (Baron Jorge de la Paz y Silveira), a Portuguese nobleman related to the McDonnells of Ulster through his mother. After the baron died, his widow Beatriz Silveira implemented his wishes and the college came into existence. Alcalá de Henares is a town to the northeast of Madrid, where the Complutense University was situated. The college and its chapel were dedicated to St. George, and were formally known as the Royal Irish College of St. George the Martyr, Alcala (Spanish: Real Colegio de San Jorge Myrtir de los Irlandeses). Students would study for seven years in Theology and Arts, and the college was affiliated to the Complutense University of Madrid (which moved to Madrid, eventually reopening a branch in Alcala as the University of Alcalá), aimed at training clerics for Ireland, Belgium(Flanders) and The Netherlands. The Irish Franciscan Luke Wadding, O.F.M. wrote the statutes for the college.

The first rector of the college was Rev. Godfrey Daniel.

In 1767, following the expulsion of the Jesuits, an attempt was made to merge the Royal Scots College in Madrid with the Irish College at Alcala, and the assets of the Scots college were transferred to the Irish College by Royal decree. This merger was annulled by decree in 1771 and the Royal Scots College re-established at Valladolid.

== Colegio Menor de San Patricio or de los Irlandeses (1630-1641) ==
An earlier college was founded in 1630 by Seán Ó Neill - the College of St Patrick in Alacala Spanish: Colegio de San Patricio de Alcalá; after his death in 1641, the college closed due to financial issues. Irish students would have studied at the Studium / University in Alcala before 1630 but were not formally in their own college.

== Closure ==
The college, like other colleges in Spain, was merged into Irish College at Salamanca in 1785. The college archive was transferred to Salamanca, and subsequently, as part of the Salamanca Archives, in 1951 transferred to St. Patrick's College, Maynooth. In 1796, its church as attached to the college, was demolished. The building came under the ownership of the Count of Revillagigedo. In 1818, King Ferdinand II, a friend of the Count on a visit to Alcalá de Henares, stayed in the building. In 1936, during the Spanish Civil War, it lost one of its four bays.

== Colegio de los Irlandeses Foundation ==
In the 1980s the mayor of Alcala oversaw many projects to restore buildings in the city associated with the university, in 1985 restoration work bagan on the Irish College building. In 1988, as a joint effort of the City Council, the University of Alcalá and the Embassy of Ireland, the Colegio de los Irlandeses Foundation was founded, to maintain the heritage of the college, and to promote educational and cultural links between the city, university and Ireland.

In 1996 the University of Alcala took ownership of the building. With funding from the Jefferson Smurfit Group, building was restored and in Agreement with the Irish Embassy and University the building now used to house foreign students. The name of the Plaza de los Irlandeses (Irish Square) is another legacy of the Irish presence in the city.

The connection with Ireland is continued through The Alcalá Centre for Irish Studies (“Alka-Éire”), a research institute at the University of Alcala (Madrid).

== Alumni ==
- Andrew Campbell, Bishop of Kilmore between 1753 – 69
- James Fagan, appointed Bishop of Meath in 1707, but resigned from office (his brother Luke Fagan served Meath and Dublin
- Michael O'Gara, Archbishop of Tuam between 1740 and 1748 (former rector of the college)
- Patrick Tyrrell O.F.M., bishop of Clogher and Meath

== Rectors ==
- Rev. Godfrey Daniel (1648- ) - the first rector
- Rev. John (Juan Malli) Malley
- Rev. Hugo Fayo
- Rev. Raymond Heneghan (1707–1709)
- Rev. Charles Jordan (1710) and (1712–14)
- Rev. Mathew Talbott (1711–12)
- Rev. James Barry (1714–16)
- Rev. Thomas O'Beime (1716–19) - Bishop of Ardagh (1739–47)
- Rev. John Skerritt (1719–21)
- Rev. James O'Toole (1722–24)
- Rev. Bernard O'Connor (1725–28)
- Rev. Dr Michael O'Gara (1728–40) - Archbishop of Tuam (1740–48)
- Rev. Bemard O'Concannon (1740–42)
- Rev. Dr Gerard Plunkett (1742–44)
- Rev. James (Santiago) Cavanagh (1745–47)
- Rev. Tulio MacKenna (1747–49)
- Rev. Bernard O'Kelly (1748 - interim)
- Rev. James Purcell (1749–52)
- Rev. John O'Lean (1753–54)
- Rev. Bemard Conor (1754–57)
- Rev. William Carington (1758–60)
- Rev. William Murray (1760–61)
- Rev. Patrick Hogan (1761–62)
- Rev. Francis Lonergan (1762–63)
- Rev. John Ward (1763–65)
- Rev. Charles MacDonnell (1765–66)
- Rev. Richard Plunkett (1766–67)
- Rev. James Sheehy (1767–68)
- Rev. Charles (Carlos) MacKiernan (1768–70)
- Rev. Francis (Francisco) O'Lean (1770–71)
- Rev. Patrick Magennis (1773–85) - the final rector
