= Thomas Flynn (bishop of Achonry) =

Styles of Thomas Flynn
- Reference style: The Most Reverend
- Spoken style: Your Grace
- Religious style: Monsignor

The Most Reverend Thomas Flynn (8 July 1931 – 3 June 2015) was an Irish Roman Catholic clergyman who served as Bishop of Achonry from 1976 to 2007.

Born in Ballaghaderreen, County Roscommon, Ireland, on 8 July 1931, Bishop Thomas was educated in the De La Salle N.S., Ballaghaderreen and St Nathy's College. He entered St Patrick's College Maynooth. He was ordained a priest for the Diocese of Achonry on 17 June 1956. He was appointed Bishop of Achonry by the Holy See on 30 December 1976. He was consecrated bishop on 20 February 1977, his principal consecrator was Gaetano Alibrandi, Apostolic Nuncio to Ireland, and his principal co-consecrators were Joseph Cunnane, Archbishop of Tuam and James Fergus, Bishop Emeritus of Achonry. Thomas Flynn retired bishop of the diocese on 20 November 2007 and became Bishop Emeritus of Achonry.

Catholic Church titles
Preceded by James Fergus	Bishop of Achonry; 1976–2007	Succeeded by Brendan Kelly
