= Patrick Robert Kirwan =

Patrick Robert Kirwan was an Irish Roman Catholic bishop in the second half of the 18th century. He was Roman Catholic Bishop of Achonry from 1752 to 1776.

Catholic Church titles
| Preceded by Walter Blake | Bishop of Achonry; 1758–1776 | Succeeded by Philip Phillips |
