= James Blakedon =

Bishop of Achonry; Bishop of Bangor (d. 1464)

James Blakedon O.P., D.Th. (died 1464) was a medieval prelate who served as Bishop of Achonry from 1442 to 1453, then Bishop of Bangor from 1453 to 1464.

A Dominican friar and Doctor of Theology, he was born in Blakedon (or Blackdon) in Somerset, England. He was appointed Bishop of Achonry in Ireland by the Holy See on 15 October 1442, although it is not known if he ever made a visitation to that diocese. He did act as a suffragan bishop in the English dioceses of Salisbury, Bath & Wells, Exeter, and Worcester between 1442 and 1453. He was translated to the bishopric of Bangor in Wales on 7 February 1453. Around that time he also became Master of St Catherine's Hospital at Bedminster, Bristol. He held those two last appointments until his death, sometime before 3 October 1464.

== Bibliography ==
- Cotton, Henry (1850). The Province of Connaught. Fasti Ecclesiae Hiberniae: The Succession of the Prelates and Members of the Cathedral Bodies of Ireland. Volume 4. Dublin: Hodges and Smith.
- Fryde, E. B.; Greenway, D. E.; Porter, S.; Roy, I., eds. (1986). Handbook of British Chronology (3rd, reprinted 2003 ed.). Cambridge: Cambridge University Press. ISBN 0-521-56350-X.
- Jones, B. (1965). The Welsh Dioceses. Fasti Ecclesiae Anglicanae 1300–1541. Volume 11. British History Online.

Catholic Church titles
Preceded by Tadhg Ó Dalaigh	Bishop of Achonry; 1442–1453	Succeeded by Cornelius Ó Mochain
Preceded by John Stanberry	Bishop of Bangor; 1453–1464	Succeeded by Richard Edenham
