= John Ó hAirt =

Irish Roman Catholic bishop

John Ó hAirt was an Irish Roman Catholic bishop in the mid-18th century. He was Roman Catholic Bishop of Achonry from 1735 to 1739.

Catholic Church titles
Preceded by Dominic Ó Dálaigh	Bishop of Achonry; 1735–1739	Succeeded by Walter Blake
