= Máel Ruanaid Ua Ruadáin =

Máel Ruanaid Ua Ruadáin (died 1170) was Bishop of Achonry from 1152 until his death.

He was present at the Synod of Kells.
