= Charles Lynagh =

Irish clergyman and Bishop of Achonry

Charles Lynagh was an Irish clergyman who served as Bishop of Achonry from 1803 until his death on 27 April 1808.

He died at Westport, County Mayo, and is buried at Aughagower in the same county.

Catholic Church titles
Preceded by Tomás Ó Conchúir	Bishop of Achonry; 1803–1808	Succeeded by John O'Flynn
