= Coela =

Coela or Cœla (Greek: Κοίλα) was a ancient city and bishopric in the province of Europa and is now a Latin Catholic titular see.

== History ==
The site of the Ancient city is at modern Kilya, in European Turkey. It was import enough to become a bishopric, suffragan of the Metropolitan of Perinthus, the archbishopric in the capital of the Roman province of Europa.

== Ecclesiastic history ==
Coela was the seat an ancient episcopal see of the Roman province of Europe in the civil diocese of Thrace. It was part of the patriarchate of Constantinople and was suffragan of the archdiocese of Eraclea.

The Notitiae Episcopatuum of the patriarchate of Constantinople reflect this evolution. The oldest Notitiae, from the seventh to the first half of the ninth century, report only the diocese of Cela; with the Notitia attributed to the emperor Leo VI and datable at the beginning of the tenth century, Cela disappears while the diocese of Madito makes an appearance among the suffragans of Heraclea, uninterruptedly documented in the Notitiae up to the fourteenth century.

Today the diocese is a suppressed seat of the patriarchate of Constantinople and a titular seat of the Roman Catholic Church.

=== Ancient Bishopric ===
- Cyril took part in the council of Ephesus in 431 and because of a pain in the hand he signed using his priest Selenespondio in his place;
- Theotecno signed in 458 the letter of the bishops of the province of Europe to the emperor Leo after the death of the patriarch Proterio of Alessandria.

At the Second Council of Nicaea in 787, Bishop Leonide was present, whose subscription as "Bishop of Cela" accompanies the definition of conciliar faith, after the last session.

Since 1933 Cela di Europa has been counted among the bishopric holders of the Catholic Church; the title has not been assigned since June 3, 1980.

=== Titular see ===
The diocese was nominally restored in 1937 as a Latin titular bishopric of the lowest (episcopal) rank.

It is vacant, having has had the following incumbents, mostly secular priests :

- Joseph Walsh (1937.12.16 – 1940.01.16), Auxiliary Bishop of Tuam (Ireland) (1937.12.16 – 1940.01.16), later Metropolitan Archbishop of the same Tuam (1940.01.16 – 1969.01.31), later Titular Archbishop of Tubernuca (1969.01.31 – 1972.06.20)
- George Joseph Donnelly (1940.03.19 – 1946.11.09)
- Cândido Bento Maria Penso, Dominican Order (O.P.) (1947.06.19 – 1957.01.17)
- Francesco Ricceri (1957.03.16 – 1961.05.15)
- João Batista Marchesi, Salesians (S.D.B.) (1962.05.21 – 1980.06.03)

== See also ==
- Catholic Church in Italy
