= Robeen =

Civil parish in County Mayo, Ireland

- Civil parish
- Location in Ireland
- Coordinates: 53°40′51″N 9°08′59″W
- Country: Ireland
- Province: Connacht
- County: County Mayo
- Time zone: UTC+0 (WET)
  - Summer (DST): UTC-1 (IST (WEST))
- Irish Grid Reference: M236710

Robeen (Irish: Róibín) is a civil parish in the historical barony of Kilmaine in County Mayo, Ireland. Robeen is also a Catholic parish within the Roman Catholic Archdiocese of Tuam. The area contains a Catholic church (Our Lady of Sorrows), national (primary) school (Robeen National School), crèche and pub. Although the Catholic parish of Robeen has a parochial house and priest based there, the parish priest is based in the neighbouring parish of Roundfort.

== Geography ==
Robeen is located approximately 5 km (3 mi) west of Hollymount and 8 km (5 mi) north of Ballinrobe. The River Robe runs through the area and Lough Carra is located two miles to the west beside the townland of Brownstown. The area is overlooked by the Partry Mountains, which are approximately 20 km (10 mi) to the west.

== See also ==
- Roman Catholic Archdiocese of Tuam
