= Walter Blake (bishop) =

Walter Blake was an Irish Roman Catholic bishop in the mid-18th century. He was Roman Catholic Bishop of Achonry from 1739 to 1758.

Catholic Church titles
Preceded by John Ó hAirt	Bishop of Achonry; 1739–1758	Succeeded by Patrick Robert Kirwan
