= John O'Flynn (bishop) =

John O'Flynn was an Irish clergyman who served firstly as parish priest at Curry, County Sligo; and then as Bishop of Achonry from 1809 until his death on 18 July 1817.

Catholic Church titles
Preceded by Charles Lynagh	Bishop of Achonry; 1809–1817	Succeeded by Patrick MacNicholas
