= Action Tuam =

- Founded: 1990
- Founder: Joseph Cassidy, Archbishop of Tuam
- Purpose: Employment
- Location: Tuam, County Galway
- Region served: West of Ireland
- Website: Official Website

Action Tuam was established as a non-profit organisation in 1990 to assist in creating employment in North County Galway, South County Mayo and County Roscommon. Action Tuam is registered in Ireland with the Companies Registration Office (CRO). The organisation offers advice and industrial unit rental to start-up SMEs and entrepreneurs with business ideas with the potential to create employment in the West of Ireland.

== History ==
The origins of Action Tuam date to the early 1980s and a government decision to close the Greencore sugar factory at Tuam. The sugar factory had been a major source of employment in North Galway, and then Archbishop of Tuam, Joseph Cassidy convened a meeting to discuss the issue of unemployment, at which a task group was formed.

The original enterprise centre was set up in 1992 at Tuam Business Park. It attracted several small business, including John Concannon's "JFC Manufacturing", now a multi-national operation. The group converted an old textile factory into industrial units, and the centre was officially opened in March 1994 by the then Minister for Enterprise and Employment Ruairi Quinn. The industrial units were later sold to tenants to finance expansion.

In 2004 the group purchased the adjacent lands from the Industrial Development Authority with a view to building a technology centre. The new Beechtree Business Park facility was constructed during 2010 and 2011 with some support from Enterprise Ireland.

To launch the Beech Tree Business Park facility, together with the Galway County and City Enterprise Board, Action Tuam ran a business competition. A special student prize was also on offer to third level entrepreneurs. The €25,000 prize fund gave three companies an opportunity to expand their business.
