= Nath Í of Achonry =

Irish saint

Saint Nath Í ("the Priest") of Achonry
- Irish saint, monastic founder
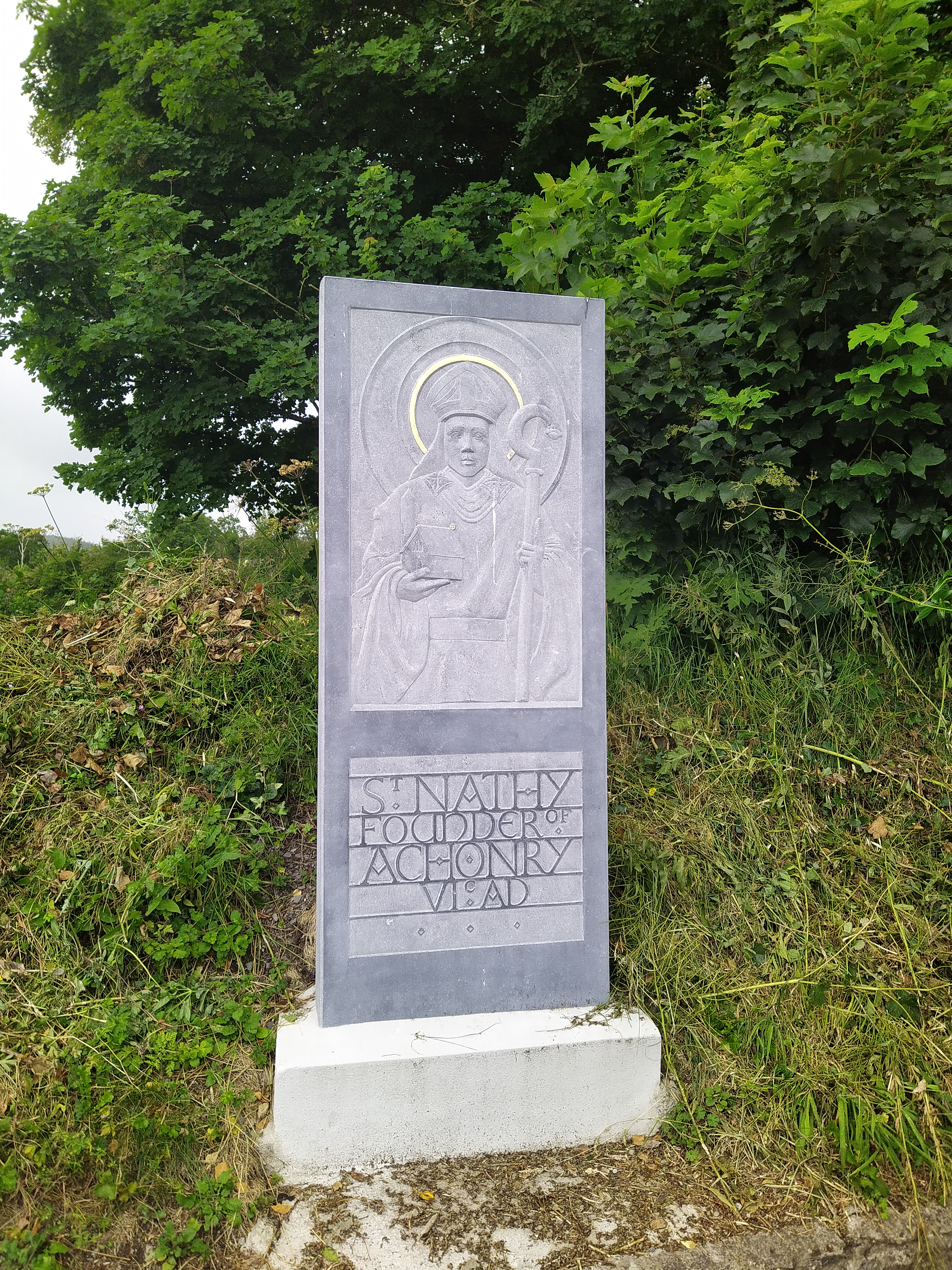
- Stone pillar depicting Saint Nathy of Achonry

Personal details
- Born: Leyney, County Sligo, among the Luigne of Connacht

Sainthood
- Feast day: 9 August
- Venerated in: Catholicism
- Patronage: Achad Conaire (Achonry)

Nath Í, or Crumnathy, (fl. 6th century) was an early Irish saint who founded a monastery at Achonry in County Sligo.

He is said to have been born in the barony of Leyney, in present-day County Sligo. In the 17th century, John Colgan compiled a Latin Life of Cormac, published in the Acta Sanctorum Hiberniae series, which relates that Cormac left his native Munster for Connacht and arrived in the area of Leyney. When Niall, the brother of the local chieftain Diarmait, begged him for a blessing, Cormac revealed that he was to have a son by the name of Conamel, whose descendants would include a number of illustrious saints, such as Náth Í "the priest". In the Martyrology of Donegal (9 August), he is described as the priest (cruimthir) Nath Í of Achad Cain Conairi.

He is said to have studied under Finnián of Clonard. On the instructions of his mentor, he founded a monastery in Achad Cain or Achad Conaire (Achonry) in the district of the Luigne, the land having been granted to him by Cennfáelad, king of Luigne. The foundation gave its name to what in the 12th century would become the diocese of Achonry. Féchín of Fore is said to have studied under him.

The Book of Lismore (fo. 43v) contains a short Irish anecdote relating what happened when Nath Í, called Dathi the Priest, was once visited by Columba, Comgall and Cainnech after the monastic community had finished their meals.

He was buried in Achad Cain and his festival is 9 August. He is the patron saint of the Irish diocese of Achonry whose cathedral is the Cathedral Church of the Annunciation of the Blessed Virgin Mary and St. Nathy.
