= Achonry =

Village in County Sligo, Ireland

Achonry Achadh Conaire
- Village
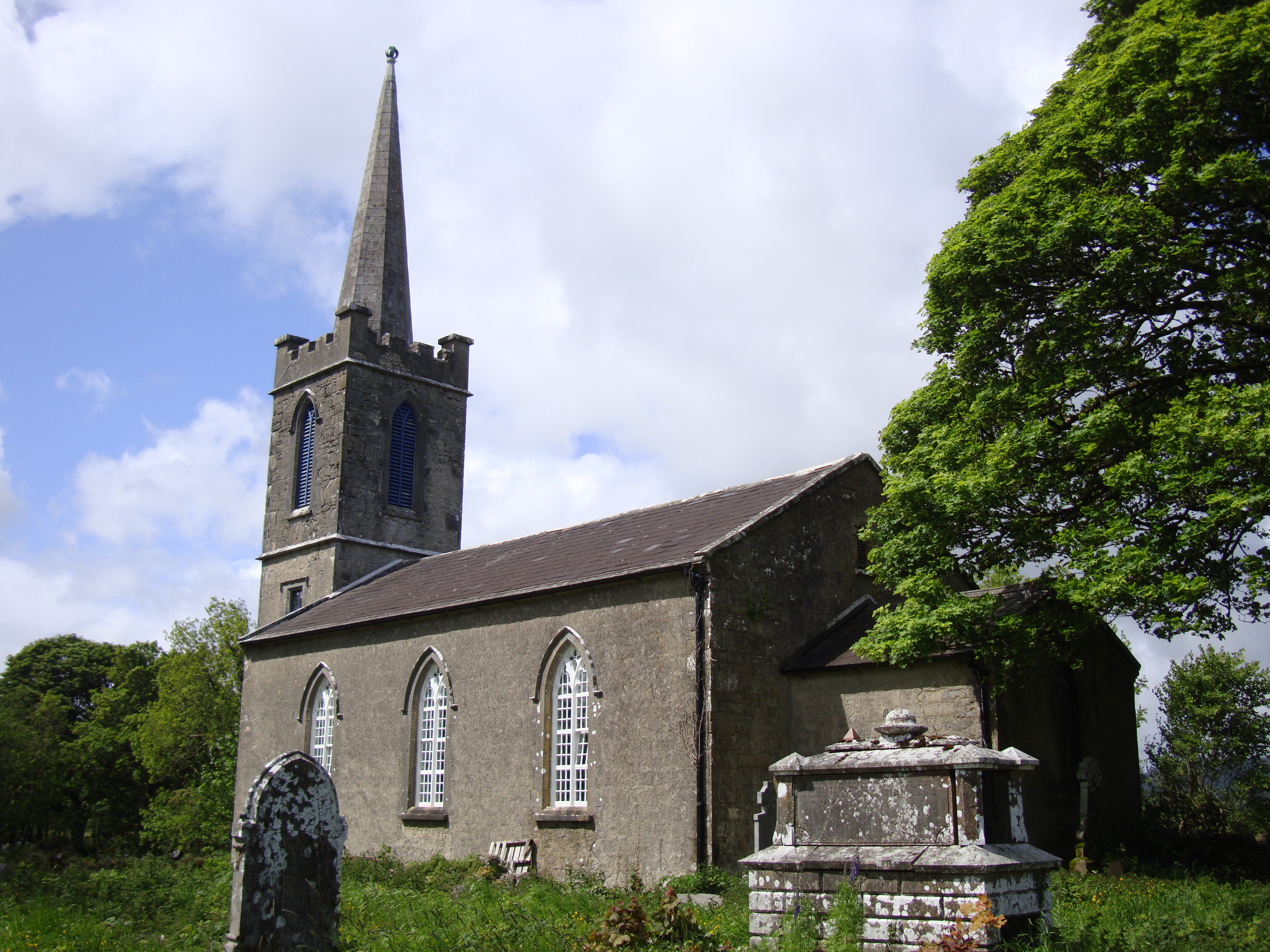
- St Crumnathy's Cathedral, in Achonry, was deconsecrated in 1998

- Location in Ireland
- Coordinates: 54°04′58″N 8°40′01″W
- Country: Ireland
- Province: Connacht
- County: County Sligo
- Elevation: 76 m (249 ft)
- Time zone: UTC+0 (WET)
  - Summer (DST): UTC-1 (IST (WEST))
- Irish Grid Reference: G563150

Achonry (/æˈkɔːnriː/; Irish: Achadh Conaire, meaning 'Conaire's field') is a village in County Sligo, Ireland. Achonry village is in a townland and civil parish of the same name. The title, Bishop of Achonry, takes its name from the village, and has been used by bishoprics in both the Roman Catholic Church and Church of Ireland.

The area's old Irish name is Achad Cain Conairi. St. Nath Í ua hEadhra (O'Hara) founded a monastery here. The foundation gave the later Diocese of Achonry its name. The monastery was founded on land granted by the Clan Conaire. Nath Í was the teacher of St. Féichín of Ballysadare. The diocese was co-extensive with the barony of Leyney (Luighne).

St. Crumnathy's Cathedral, within the parish, is a former Church of Ireland cathedral that was deconsecrated in 1998.

== Notable people ==
- Feardorcha Ó Conaill (1876–1929) - writer and former rector of Achonry
- Saint Nathy - an early Irish saint who founded a monastery at Achonry

== See also ==
- List of towns and villages in Ireland
