= Diocese of Sita =

Roman Catholic titular see

The Diocese of Sita (Latin: Dioecesis Sitensis) was a Christian diocese in Africa Proconsularis. It is presently a titular see of the Roman Catholic Church.

== History ==
In antiquity, the bishopric of Sita was centered on a Roman–Berber civitas of the province of Mauretania Caesariensis. The exact location of that Roman town is now lost to history but to was somewhere in today's Algeria.

At the 411 Carthage conference, between the Catholic and Donatist bishops of Roman North Africa The town was represented by the Donatist Saturn, without a Catholic opponent. Then in 484, the town was represented by Reparato at the synod assembled in Carthage by the Arian King Huneric the Vandal. At the conclusion of that Council, Reparato was exiled.

Today Sita survives as a titular bishopric and the current bishop is Udo Bentz, auxiliary bishop of Mainz, who replaced Joaquim Wladimir Lopes Dias in 2015.
