= Walter Lynch (bishop) =

Irish prelate

Walter Lynch (1595–1663) was an Irish prelate who served as Bishop of Clonfert in the seventeenth century.

He arrived in Ireland in 1647; and was appointed on 11 March 1647 and consecrated on 9 April 1648. He left as a refugee following the Cromwellian conquest of Ireland and spent the rest of his life serving in the Roman Catholic Diocese of Győr in Hungary. Lynch died there on 14 July 1663.

== Legacy ==
In honour of the Irish Catholic Martyrs, a copy of the weeping "Irish Madonna of Hungary", which was removed by Bishop Lynch from the former diocesan cathedral to preserve it from desecration during the Cromwellian conquest of Ireland, was presented in 2003 to the Roman Catholic Diocese of Clonfert by Bishop Pápai Janos of the Roman Catholic Diocese of Győr and now hangs inside St Brendan's Cathedral, Loughrea.

Catholic Church titles
Preceded by John de Burgh	Bishop of Clonfert; 1647–1663	Succeeded by See vacant
