= Boetius Egan (archbishop of Tuam) =

- Archbishop of Tuam
- Native name: Baothnalach Mac Aodhagáin
- Church: Catholic Church
- Archdiocese: Archdiocese of Tuam
- In office: 4 January 1788 – 1798
- Predecessor: Philip Phillips
- Successor: Edward Dillon
- Previous post: Bishop of Achonry (1785-1788)

Orders
- Ordination: 19 March 1763
- Consecration: 1786 by Philip Phillips

Personal details
- Born: 1734 Dunblaney (near Tuam), County Galway, Kingdom of Ireland
- Died: 1798 (aged 63–64)

Styles of Boetius Egan
- Reference style: The Most Reverend
- Spoken style: Your Grace or Archbishop

Boetius Egan (Irish: Baothnalach Mac Aodhagáin; 1734–1798) was a Roman Catholic Archbishop of Tuam in County Galway, Ireland.

Egan was born near Tuam, Ireland, to a family owning large estates in the County Galway. His family was reduced in position and means, and the British Penal Laws made it then difficult for an Irish Catholic to receive a Catholic education at home. At some point, he went to France to be trained as a priest. Egan attended the College of Bordeaux, there, which had been founded by Irish exiles and endowed by Queen Anne in the seventeenth century.

After his ordination, Egan returned to Ireland and served as a priest until he was appointed Bishop of Achonry in 1785. Two years later he was appointed Archbishop of Tuam. Accustomed during his whole life in Ireland to the barest toleration of his religion, he welcomed the Roman Catholic Relief Act 1793, and hastened to express his gratitude to king George III. When Maynooth College was founded in 1795, he became one of its trustees.

One of his last public acts was to sign an address to the Irish viceroy, Lord Camden, condemning the revolutionary associations then in Ireland. In this address Egan described George III as "the best of kings" and the Irish Parliament as "our enlightened legislature".

== See also ==
- Egan (surname)
- Mac Aodhagáin
