= Joseph Cunnane =

Irish archbishop

The Most Reverend Joseph Cunnane D.D.
- Archbishop of Tuam
- Church: Catholic Church
- Archdiocese: Tuam
- Appointed: 31 January 1969
- Term ended: 11 July 1987
- Predecessor: Joseph Walsh
- Successor: Joseph Cassidy

Orders
- Ordination: 18 June 1939
- Consecration: 17 March 1969

Personal details
- Born: 5 October 1913 Knock, County Mayo, Ireland
- Died: 8 March 2001 (aged 87) Tuam, County Galway, Ireland
- Buried: Tuam Cathedral Grounds, County Galway, Ireland
- Denomination: Christianity Catholic
- Education: St. Jarlath's College, Maynooth College

Joseph Cunnane D.D. (5 October 1913 – 8 March 2001) was an Irish Catholic clergyman who served as the Archbishop of Tuam from 1969 to 1987.

Born in the parish of Knock in County Mayo, he was educated at St. Jarlath's College, Tuam, and St. Patrick’s College, Maynooth. He was ordained in 1939. Following postgraduate studies in Maynooth he was awarded a Doctorate of Divinity in 1941.

He was professor of Irish at St. Jarlath's from 1941 until 1958 when he was appointed to Balla, County Mayo. He moved to Clifden, County Galway in 1967. He was appointed archbishop of the Metropolitan see of Tuam in 1969 and retired from the post on 11 July 1987.

He died in 2001 and is buried in the grounds of Tuam Cathedral.
