= St Nathy's College =

School in County Roscommon, Ireland

Coordinates: 53.9036°N 8.5803°W

- Ballaghaderreen, County Roscommon, F45 V122; Ireland

Information
- Motto: Robur Nathaei (Strength of Nathy)
- Religious affiliation: Roman Catholic Diocese of Achonry
- Denomination: Roman Catholic
- Patron saint: St. Nathy
- Principal: Martin Henry
- Website: https://www.stnathys.com/

St Nathy's College is a Catholic secondary school in Ballaghaderreen in County Roscommon, Ireland. It is the diocesan college for the Diocese of Achonry. It is one of the oldest secondary schools in Ireland, having been founded in 1810. The School was located from 1893–96 in Edmundstown House, the former residence of the Bishop. The Diocese purchased Ballaghaderreen Military Barracks from the War Office, and the School moved there in 1896. In 1995 the school ceased to be a boarding school. St. Nathys amalgamated with St. Josephs Convent (Sisters of Charity), and with the local Ballaghaderreen VEC school, becoming a co-educational school.

2010 saw the celebration of 200 years of the college, St Nathy’s 1810 to 2010, Reflections and Memories of Past Pupils, edited by Fr. Leo Henry, was published as part of the celebrations.

== Alumni ==
- Most Rev. Thomas Flynn, Bishop of Achonry and a former teacher at the school
- Most Rev. Dr. Laurence Gillooly CM, Bishop of Elphin
- Prof. Thomas Noel Mitchell, the 42nd provost of Trinity College Dublin (1991-2001)
- Patsy McGarry, Irish Times journalist
- John Healy, Irish Times journalist and author
- Most Rev. Thomas McGettrick SPS, missionary priest and Bishop of Abakaliki, Nigeria
- Noel Dorr, Irish Diplomat
- Frank Feely, former Irish Social Democratic and Labour Party (SDLP) politician in Northern Ireland
- Ted Nealon, TD and minister of state
- Claire Kerrane, TD for Roscommon–Galway elected 2020
- William O'Dwyer, 100th Mayor of New York City
- Patrick Joseph Shannon KPM JP, Deputy Commissioner of Police (Singapore)
- Louis Walsh, music manager and television personality

== Presidents of the College ==
- Canon Hugh O'Donnell (1911-1920)
- Fr. Thomas Curneen
- Fr. Thomas Fleming ( - 1965)
- Fr. Thomas Flynn
- Fr. Robert Flynn (1977 - 1978)
- Fr. James Colleran (1978 - 1982)
- Fr. Andrew Johnston (1982- )
- Fr. Martin Convey (1996-2011)
- Fr. Tomás Surlis DD (2011-2017), served as Principal and President.
- Mr. Declan Dunne (2017- 2022), first lay Principal of the College.
- Fr. Martin Henry

== Sports ==
St. Nathy's has a strong tradition in sports, particularly in Gaelic Football, Basketball, and Handball.

In Gaelic Football, the college was crowned All-Ireland Champions in 1957, winning The Hogan_Cup, and won the Connacht Colleges Senior Football Championship in 1928, 1949, 1957, 1959, and 1968.

In Basketball, the college was crowned All-Ireland Champions at senior level (U19) in 1982 and 1984, and at U16 (Tailteann Games) level in 1982.

== Controversy ==
St. Nathy's was accused by an RTÉ Prime Time Investigates programme of falsifying student numbers to inflate food grants. No prosecution was sought due to "insufficient evidence", and St. Nathy's repaid the Department of Social Protection about €646,000.
