= Cathedral of the Annunciation of the Blessed Virgin Mary and St Nathy, Ballaghaderreen =

Ballaghaderreen Cathedral
- Cathedral of the Annunciation of the Blessed Virgin Mary and St Nathy
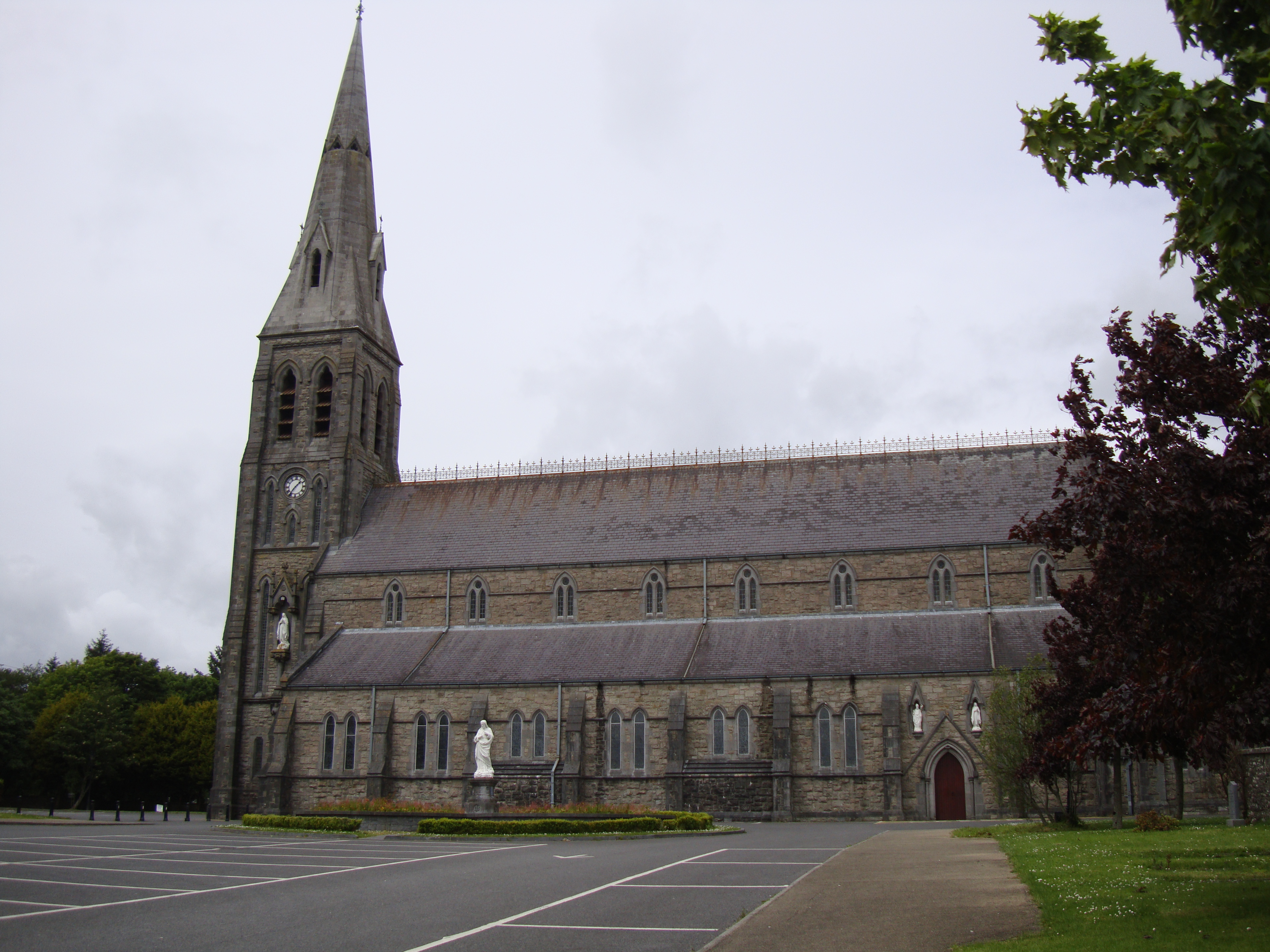
- Ballaghaderreen Cathedral
- 53°54′13″N 8°34′40″W
- Location: Ballaghaderreen, County Roscommon
- Country: Ireland
- Denomination: Roman Catholic
- Website: Ballaghaderreen Cathedral

History
- Consecrated: 1860

Architecture
- Style: Gothic Revival
- Groundbreaking: 1855
- Completed: 1860

Specifications
- Length: 45.72 m (150.0 ft)
- Width: 17.9 m (59 ft)
- Height: 20.4 m (67 ft)

Administration
- Province: Tuam
- Archdiocese: Tuam
- Diocese: Achonry

Clergy
- Bishop: Paul Dempsey

Ballaghaderreen Cathedral (Full title: The Cathedral Church of the Annunciation of the Blessed Virgin Mary and St. Nathy) is the cathedral church of the Roman Catholic Diocese of Achonry. Located in Ballaghaderreen, County Roscommon in Ireland, the cathedral was commissioned in 1855.

The cathedral, commissioned to be built by Bishop Patrick Durcan in the Gothic style, was begun in 1855 and completed in 1860. Durcan had come to the small diocese several years earlier and wanted a new Cathedral to meets the needs of the people of Ballaghaderreen.

This initial part of the Cathedral consisted of an "eight-bay nave with clerestory and lean-to side aisles, a four-stage tower with spire to west, square-ended chancel to east with sacristy and mortuary chapel to north and south."

The new Cathedral was consecrated and opened in November 1860.

The bell tower of 59.6 metres with a needle and a carillon of bells and new sacristy were all added in 1912 by the project architect, William H. Byrne Irish. Because of its height, the body of the church in grey limestone seems small, but is 45.72 metres (150 feet) long, 17.9 metres (59 feet) wide and 20.4 metres (67 feet) high.

The interior has a single nave. South of the west door is the baptismal font dating from around 1870.

== 21st century renovation ==
In August 2017 it was announced that the cathedral would close for six months to allow essential construction work on the listed building begin including repairs to the roof, pointing of stone and lighting as well as a heating upgrade. Weekday and Sunday Masses would be held in the chapel of St. Nathy's College and funerals in other churches in the parish.

== Bibliography ==
- Peter Galloway, The Cathedrals of Ireland, The Institute of Irish Studies, The Queen's University of Belfast, 1992
