= 1947 Hogan Cup =

- Dates: 20 April – 11 May 1947
- Teams: 4
- Champions: St Jarlath's College (1st title); Vincent McHale (captain)
- Runners-up: St Patrick's Grammar School

Tournament statistics
- Matches played: 3
- Goals scored: 18 (6 per match)
- Points scored: 48 (16 per match)

The 1947 Hogan Cup was the second staging of the Hogan Cup since its establishment by the Gaelic Athletic Association in 1946. The competition ran from 20 April to 11 May 1947.

St Patrick's Grammar School were the defending champions.

The final was played on 11 May 1947 at Croke Park in Dublin, between St Jarlath's College and St Patrick's Grammar School, in what was their second consecutive meeting in the final. St Jarlath's College won the match by 4–10 to 3–08 to claim their first ever Hogan Cup title.

== Qualification ==
Province	Champions
Connacht	St Jarlath's College
Leinster	St Mel's College
Munster	St Brendan's College
Ulster	St Patrick's Grammar School

== Results ==
=== Semi-finals ===
20 April 1947 Semi-final	St Jarlath's College	5-12 - 1-00	St Brendan's College	St Jarlath's Park

27 April 1947 Semi-final	St Patrick's Grammar School	3-12 - 2-06	St Mel's College	Breffni Park

=== Final ===
11 May 1947 Final	St Jarlath's College	4-10 - 3-08	St Patrick's Grammar School	Croke Park
