= Cathedral of the Assumption of the Blessed Virgin Mary, Tuam =

Tuam Cathedral
- The Cathedral Church of the Assumption of the Blessed Virgin Mary
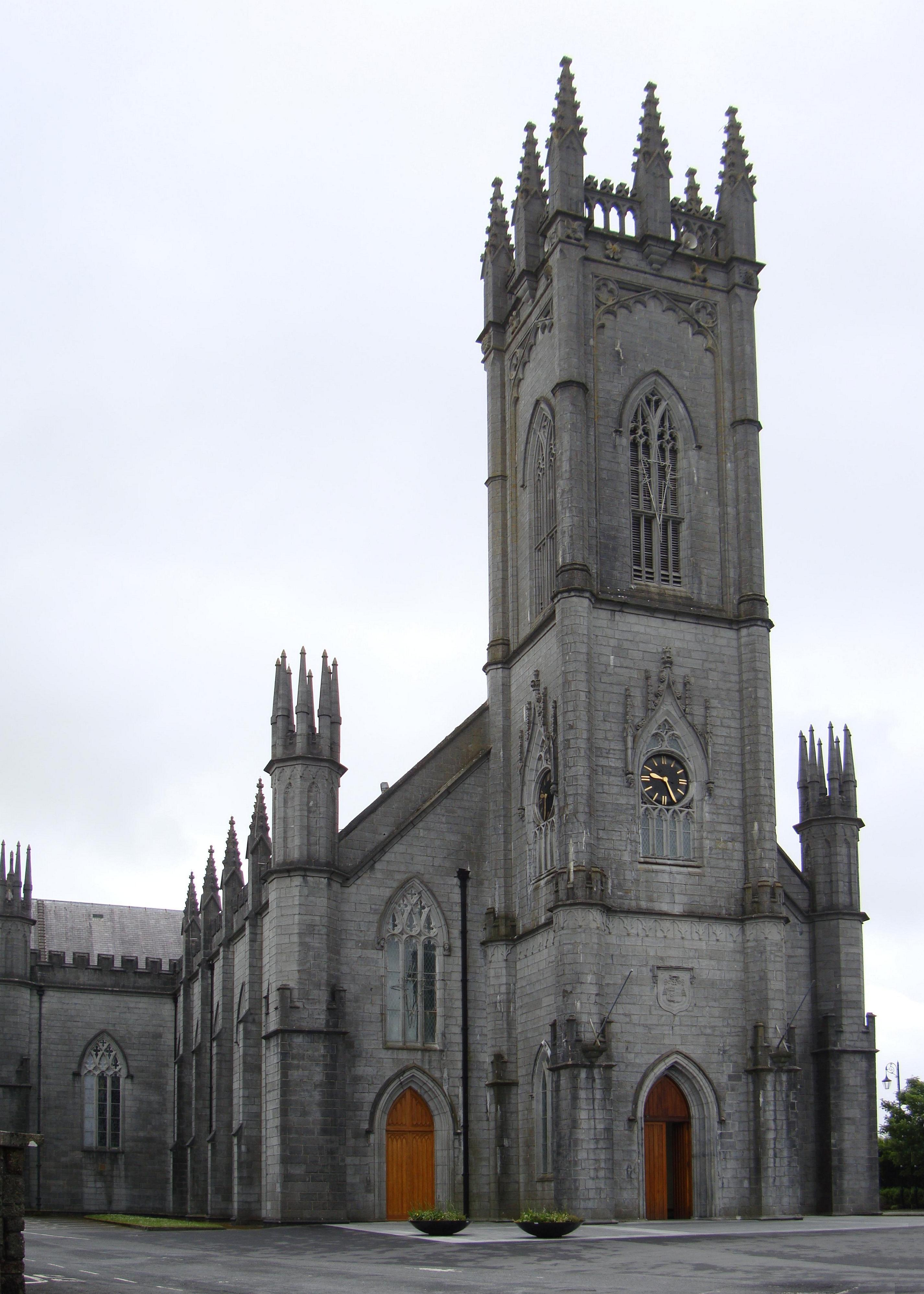
- Tuam Cathedral
- 53°30′53″N 8°50′51″W
- Location: Bishop Street, Tuam
- Country: Ireland
- Denomination: Roman Catholic
- Website: https://www.tuamparish.com/

History
- Former name: St. Jarlath's Cathedral
- Founded: 30 April 1827
- Founder: Archbishop Oliver O'Kelly
- Dedicated: 18 August 1837

Architecture
- Architect: Dominic Madden
- Style: Decorated Gothic
- Construction cost: £14,204 0s 5d

Specifications
- Capacity: 1,100 seated
- Height: 43 metres
- Materials: Limestone

Administration
- Diocese: Archdiocese of Tuam

Clergy
- Archbishop: Francis Duffy

The Cathedral Church of the Assumption of the Blessed Virgin Mary, Tuam, commonly called Tuam Cathedral, is the cathedral for the Roman Catholic Archdiocese of Tuam in Ireland. The geographic remit of the Archdiocese includes half of County Galway, half of County Mayo and part of County Roscommon. Prior to the English Reformation, the diocesan cathedral was St Mary's, which was constructed in the 14th century, on the site of an earlier building. Upon the appointment of William Mullaly by Queen Elizabeth I of England as Archbishop of Tuam for the Established church, the Roman Catholic clergy were dispossessed of the cathedral. Almost three centuries were to elapse before a relaxation of the Penal Laws permitted the building of a replacement – the current edifice.

== Burials ==
- John de Burgh (Archbishop) – in the Oratory of St. Jarlath.
- John MacHale, Archbishop of Tuam – before the high altar
- Joseph Cunnane, Archbishop of Tuam – in the cathedral grounds

== Gallery ==
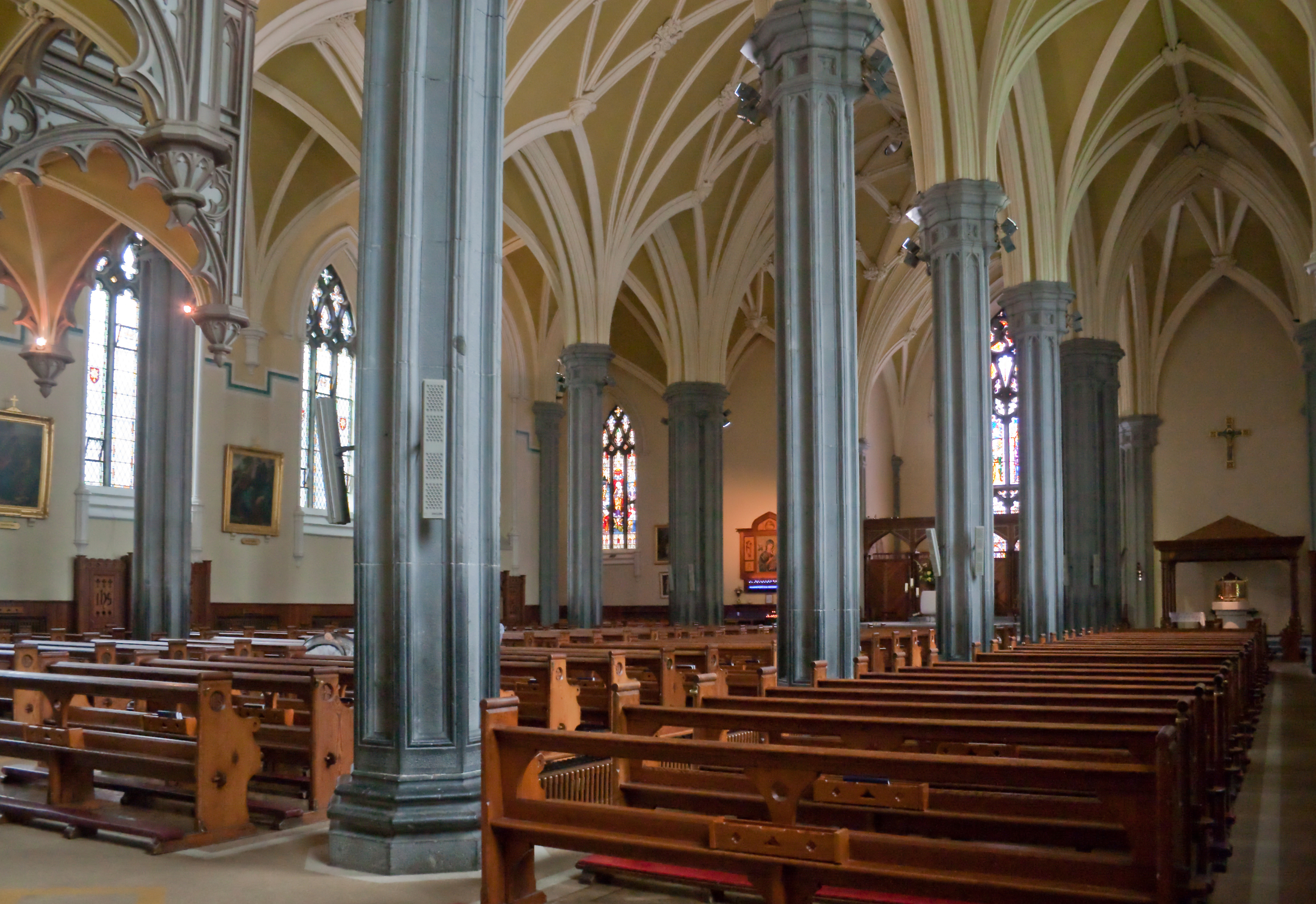
Cathedral Interior

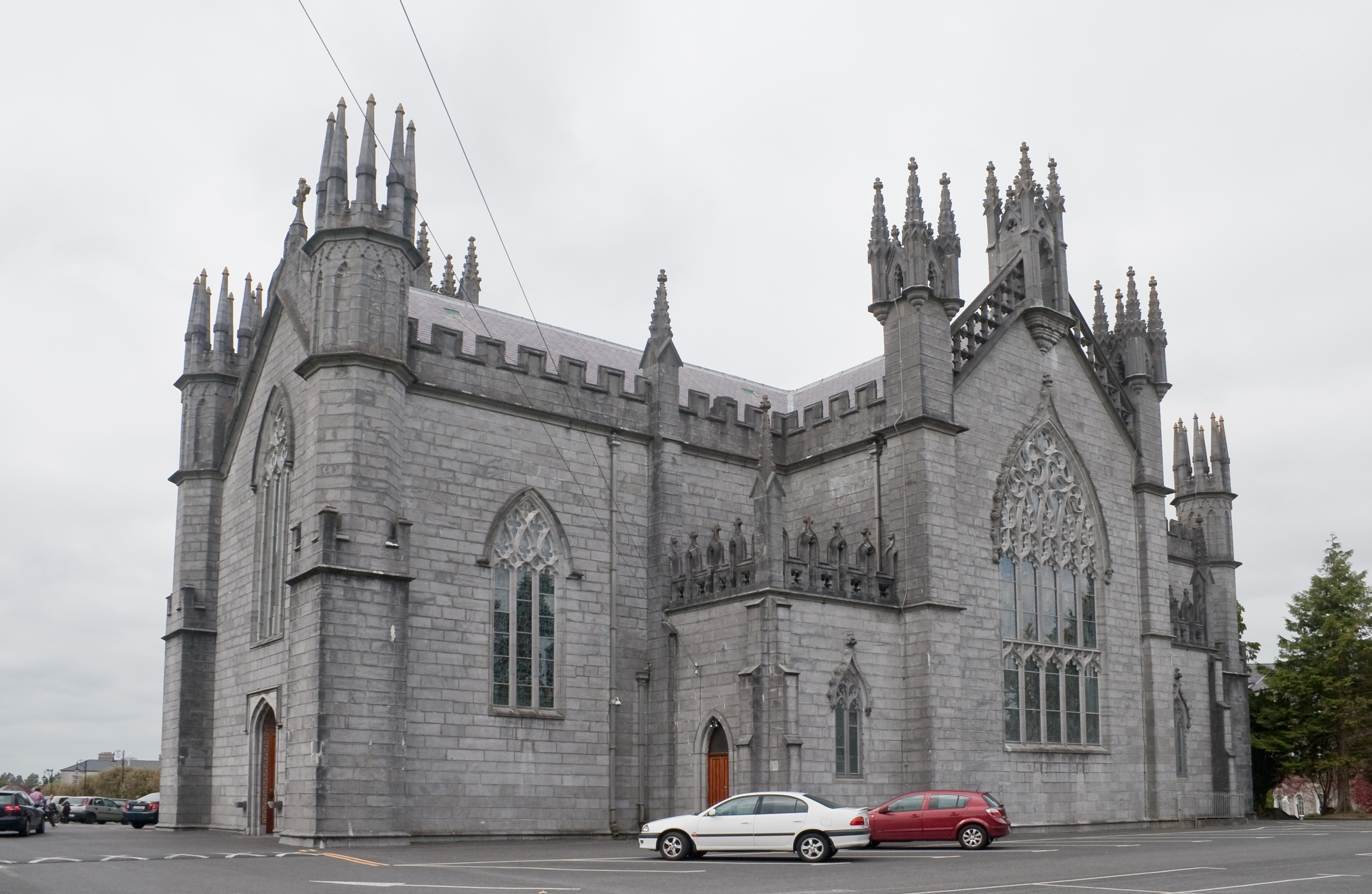
Exterior looking southeast

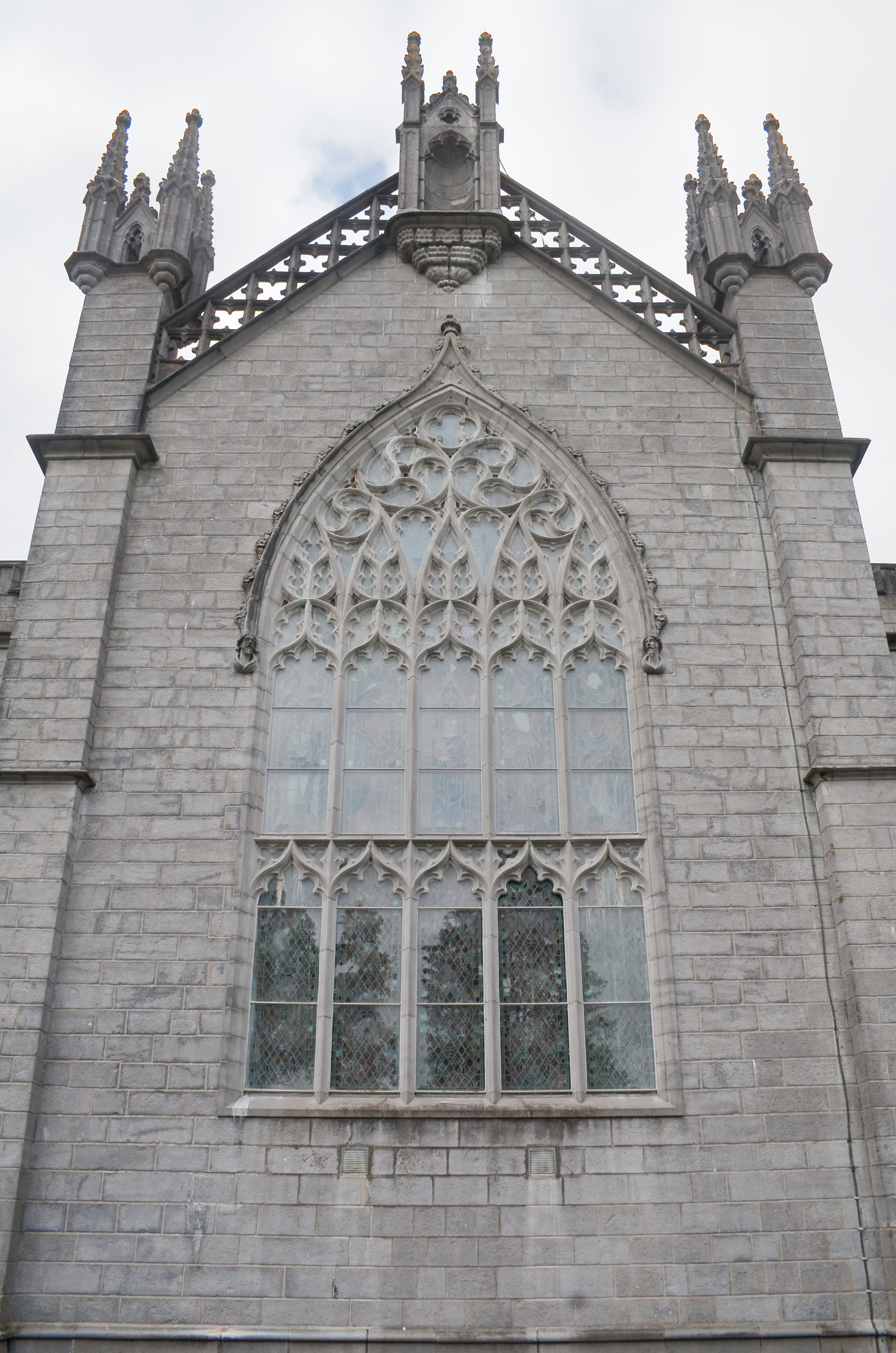
East transept and window

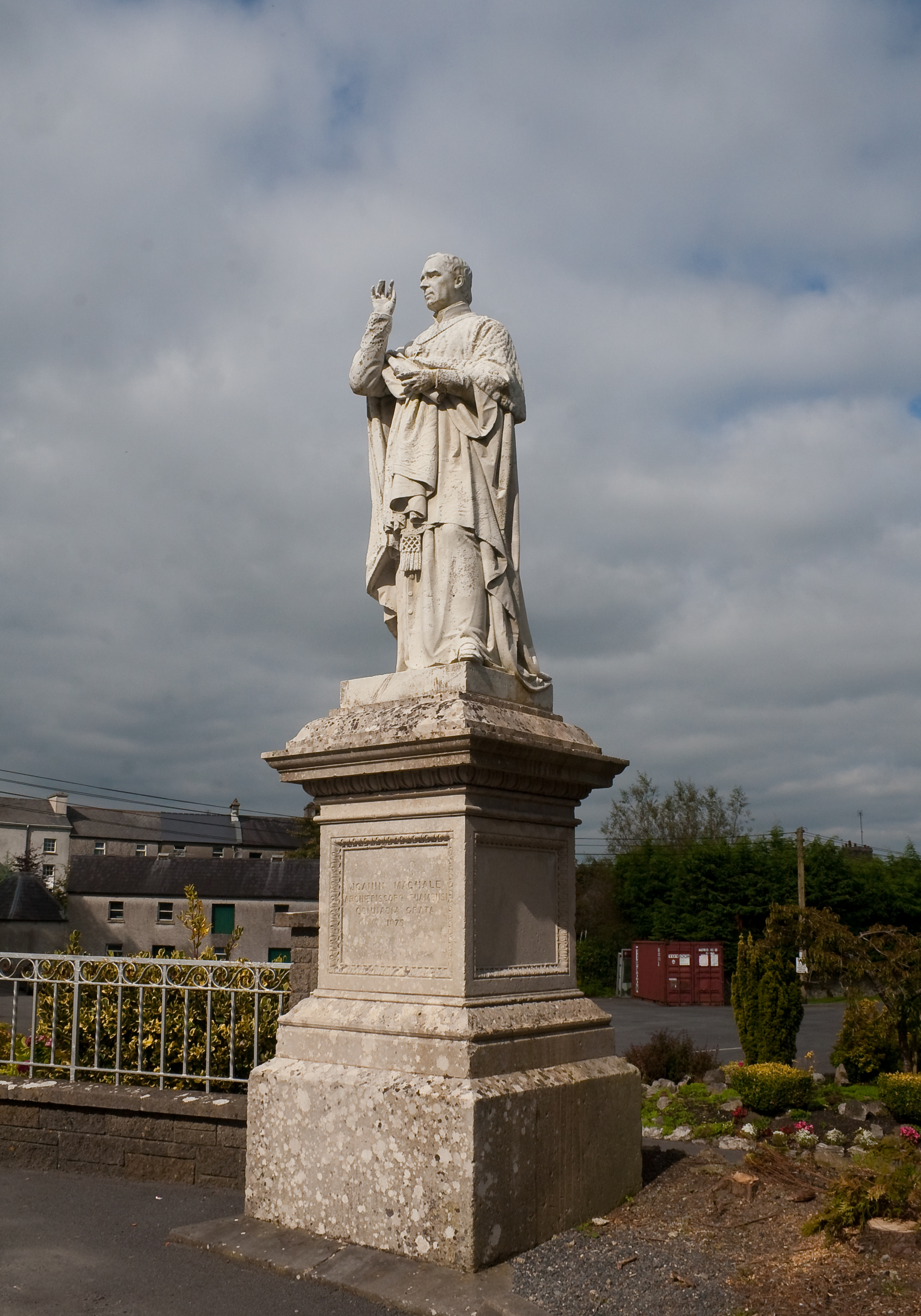
Monument to Archbishop John MacHale

== Bibliography ==
- Jeremy Williams A Companion Guide to Architecture in Ireland 1837–1921, Irish Academic Press 1994
- Peter Galloway The Cathedrals of Ireland, The Institute of Irish Studies, The Queen's University of Belfast, 1992

== See also ==
- List of cathedrals in Ireland
