= Patrick Morrisroe =

Irish Catholic priest (1869–1946)

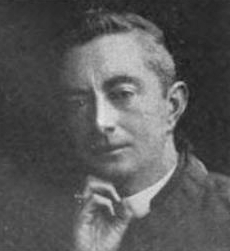
- Born: 16 February 1869; Charlestown, Ireland
- Died: 28 May 1946 (aged 77); Ballaghadereen, Ireland
- Occupation: Clergyman

Patrick Morrisroe (16 February 1869 – 28 May 1946) was an Irish Catholic priest and Bishop of Achonry.

== Early life and education ==
Patrick Morrisroe was born on 16 February 1869 in Charlestown, County Mayo. He was educated locally and studied for the priesthood at Maynooth College from 1885 to 1893 when he was ordained priest for service in the Diocese of Achonry Counties Mayo, Roscommon and Sligo. He spent a short time undertaking postgraduate studies but was needed for pastoral work in his native diocese and was appointed to a curacy.

In 1896 he returned to Maynooth to serve as Junior Dean, completing 14 years of service until 1910.

== Episcopal ministry ==
Aged 44 he was ordained Bishop of Achonry, in the cathedral, Ballaghadareen, along with his cousin Dr. Michael J. O'Doherty who became Bishop of Zamboagna, Philippines.

His brother was the politician James Morrisroe who served as a Cumann na nGaedheal TD for Mayo North.

Bishop Morrisroe died on 28 May 1946 at the Bishops Palace, Edmondstown House, Ballaghadereen.
