= Roman Catholic Diocese of Achonry =

Diocese of the Catholic Church in Ireland

Coordinates: 53.9036°N 8.5779°W

Diocese of Achonry Dioecesis Achadensis Deoise Achadh Conaire

Catholic
- Cathedral of the Annunciation of the Blessed Virgin Mary and St Nathy, Ballaghaderreen

Location
- Country: Ireland
- Territory: Parts of counties Mayo, Roscommon and Sligo
- Ecclesiastical province: Tuam

Statistics
- Area: 346 sq mi (900 km^{2})
- Population: Total; Catholics: (as of 2015); 39,000 (est.); 36,234 (92.9%)
- Parishes: 23

Information
- Denomination: Catholic
- Sui iuris church: Latin Church
- Rite: Roman Rite
- Established: Between 1111 and 1152
- Cathedral: Cathedral of the Annunciation of the Blessed Virgin Mary and St Nathy, Ballaghaderreen
- Patron saint: Nathy; Attracta
- Secular priests: 41 (diocesan); 1 (Religious Orders)

Current leadership
- Pope: Leo XIV
- Bishop: Kevin Doran
- Metropolitan Archbishop: Francis Duffy, Archbishop of Tuam
- Apostolic Administrator: Kevin Doran, Bishop of Elphin

Map
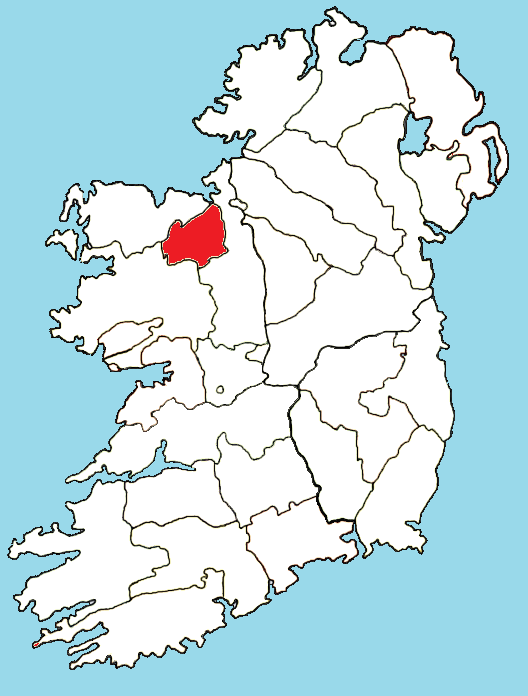

Website
- achonrydiocese.org

The Diocese of Achonry (Irish: Deoise Achadh Conaire) is a Latin Church diocese of the Catholic Church in the western part of Ireland. It is one of the five suffragan sees of the Archdiocese of Tuam. The diocese was often called the "bishopric of Luighne" in the Irish annals. It was not established at the Synod of Rathbreasail, but Máel Ruanaid Ua Ruadáin signed as "bishop of Luighne" at the Synod of Kells.

At present there are twenty-three parishes in the diocese, located in Counties Mayo, Roscommon and Sligo. There are twenty-six priests involved in full-time parish ministry and four involved in secondary education.

On 27 January 2020 Pope Francis appointed Paul Dempsey — parish priest of Newbridge — as the new Bishop of Achonry. He received episcopal ordination in the diocesan cathedral, which is dedicated to The Annunciation and St. Nathy, in Ballaghaderreen, on 30 August 2020. However, in response to a wider reorganization of diocesan leadership within the ecclesiastical province of Tuam, Bishop Dempsey was appointed auxiliary bishop of Dublin on April 10, 2024. Subsequently, Bishop Kevin Doran of Elphin was appointed as the apostolic administrator of the Diocese of Achonry. On 16 February 2025, Pope Francis appointed Bishop Doran as the new bishop of the Diocese of Achonry, in addition to his responsibilities as bishop of the Diocese of Elphin, effectively uniting the two dioceses in persona episcopi.

The dioceses of Achonry and Elphin are currently in the process of full amalgamation. This initiative began in April 2024, when the Apostolic Nuncio, Archbishop Luis Mariano Montemayor, announced Pope Francis's decision to initiate a process of closer cooperation and consultation between the two neighboring dioceses, with the intention of eventually merging them. A similar process was proposed for the dioceses of Tuam and Killala. In November 2024, Bishop Doran issued a pastoral message outlining the journey toward amalgamation and summarizing feedback from consultations held in both dioceses. Decisions reached include joint pilgrimages, collaborative formation programs, and the establishment of a working group to facilitate the merger process. As of February 2025, the dioceses are actively working towards full amalgamation, aiming to pool resources and enhance pastoral care for the faithful.

== Geography ==
The diocese covers parts of counties Mayo, Roscommon and Sligo. The largest towns are Charlestown, Kiltimagh and Swinford.

== Ordinaries ==
List of bishops since the Reformation:

- Thomas O'Fihely (1547–1555)
- Cormac O'Coyn (1556–1561)
- Eugene O'Hart (1562–1603)
- See vacant (1603–1629)
- Andrew Lynch (Vicar Apostolic, appointed 1629)
- James Fallon (Vicar Apostolic 1631–1662)
- Maurice Durcan (Vicar Apostolic, appointed 1677)
- Hugh MacDermot (Vicar Apostolic 1684–1707, Bishop 1707–1725)
- Dominic O’Daly (1725–1735)
- John O'Hart (1735–1739)
- Walter Blake (1739–1758)
- Patrick Robert Kirwan (1758–1776)
- Philip Phillips (1776–1785)
- Boetius Egan (1785–1787)
- Thomas O'Connor (1788–1803)
- Charles Lynagh (1803–1808)
- John O'Flynn (1809–1817)
- Patrick MacNicholas (1818–1852)
- Patrick Durcan (1852–1875)
- Francis McCormack (1875–1887; coadjutor bishop 1871–1875)
- John Lyster (1888–1911)
- Patrick Morrisroe (1911–1946)
- James Fergus (1947–1976)
- Thomas Flynn (1976–2007)
- Brendan Kelly (2007–2017)
- Paul Dempsey (2020–2024)

== See also ==
- Achonry (village)
- Catholic Church in Ireland
- Diocese of Tuam, Killala and Achonry (Church of Ireland diocese)
