= Roman Catholic Archdiocese of Tuam =

Catholic archdiocese in Ireland

Coordinates: 53.5149°N 8.8476°W

Archdiocese of Tuam Archidioecesis Tuamensis Ard-Deoise Thuama

Catholic
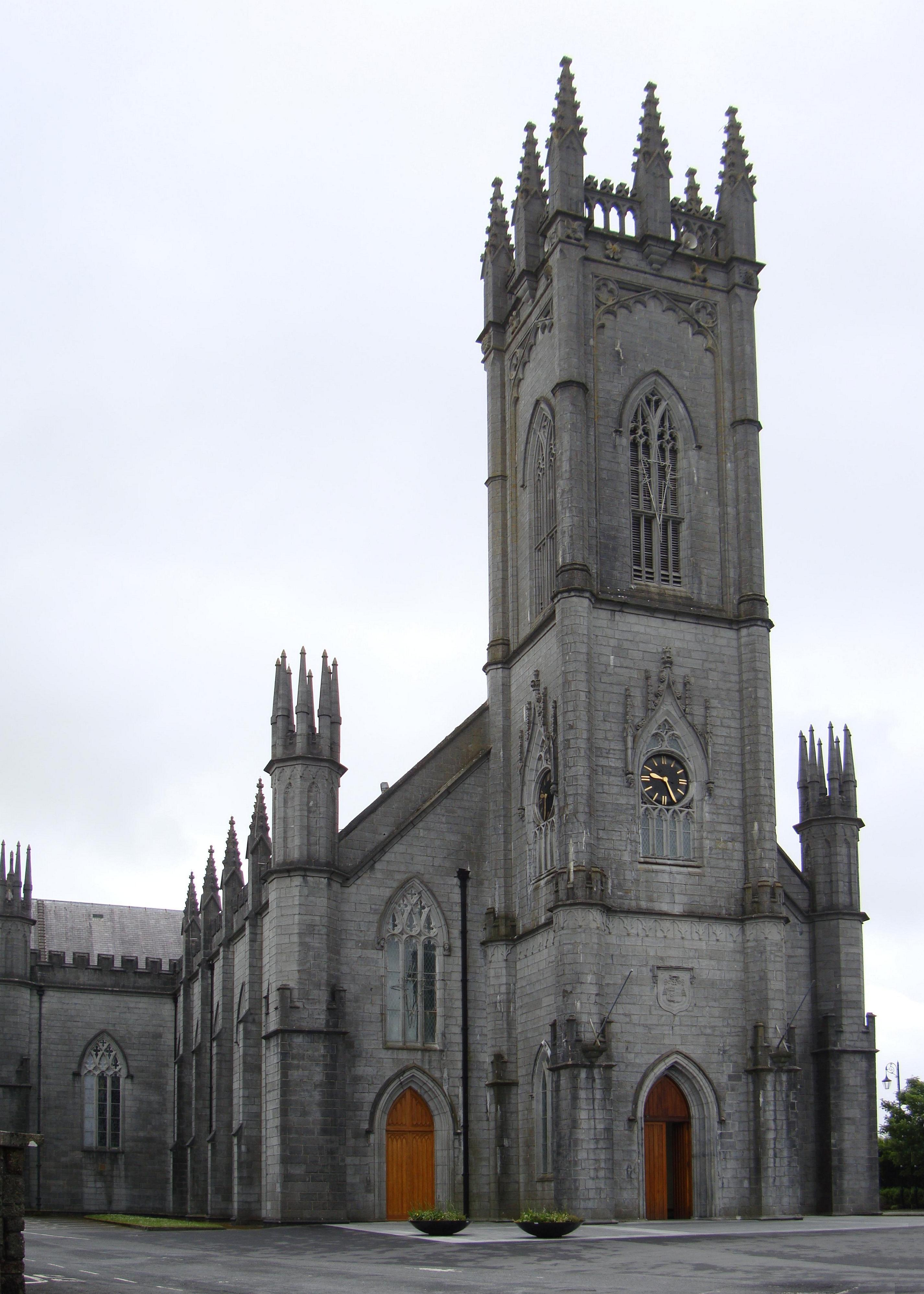
- The Cathedral of the Assumption, Tuam

Location
- Country: Ireland
- Territory: Parts of counties Mayo, Galway and Roscommon
- Ecclesiastical province: Province of Tuam

Statistics
- Area: 2,192 sq mi (5,680 km^{2})
- Population: Total; Catholics: (as of 2014); 159,378; 143,411 (90.0%)

Information
- Denomination: Catholic
- Sui iuris church: Latin Church
- Rite: Roman Rite
- Established: Archdiocese since 1152
- Cathedral: Cathedral of the Assumption, Tuam
- Patron saint: St Jarlath
- Secular priests: 103 (diocesan); 6 (Religious Orders)

Current leadership
- Pope: Leo XIV
- Metropolitan Archbishop: Francis Duffy, Archbishop of Tuam
- Vicar General: Dermot Moloney
- Bishops emeritus: Michael Neary

Map
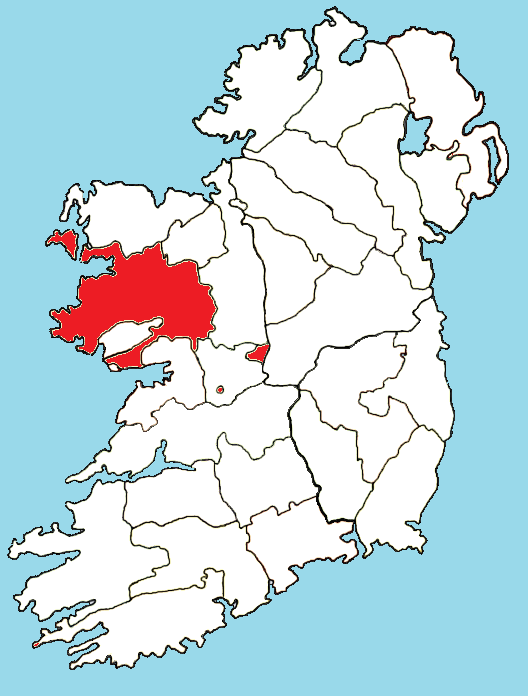

Website
- tuamarchdiocese.org

The Archdiocese of Tuam (/ˈtjuːəm/ TEW-əm; Irish: Ard-Deoise Thuama) is a Latin Church ecclesiastical territory or archdiocese of the Catholic Church located in western Ireland. The archdiocese is led by the Archbishop of Tuam, who serves as pastor of the mother church, the Cathedral of the Assumption and Metropolitan of the Metropolitan Province of Tuam. According to tradition, the "Diocese of Tuam" was established in the 6th century by St. Jarlath. The ecclesiastical province, roughly co-extensive with the secular province of Connacht, was created in 1152 by the Synod of Kells.

The incumbent Ordinary is Francis Duffy.

== Province and geographic remit ==
The Province of Tuam, is one of four ecclesiastical provinces that together form the Roman Catholic Church in Ireland; the other provinces are Armagh, Dublin and Cashel. The geographical remit of the province is confined to the Republic of Ireland alone. The suffragan sees of the Province are:

- Achonry
- Clonfert
- Elphin
- Galway, Kilmacduagh and Kilfenora
- Killala

The Archdiocese extend from Achill Island in the West to Moore parish on the River Shannon, a distance of 193 km (120 mi), and it the largest in the country. Geographically split north–south by the two lakes, Loughs Mask and Corrib, Tuam has pastoral charge of the largest Gaeltacht area in Ireland and of six island parishes. It also contains the major pilgrimage centres of Knock Shrine and Croagh.

The Kilmeen portion of Leitrim parish is surrounded by the Clonfert diocese. Moore parish is surrounded by the dioceses of Clonfert, Ardagh and Clonmacnoise and Elphin and includes an exclave of Clonfert. Both these parishes have been part of Tuam since medieval times. Shrule parish, now part of Galway diocese, is nestled in the Tuam geographical area in the east of Lough Corrib. Originally, it belonged to the medieval Diocese of Cong. But in south Connemara, 'extraterritorial' enclaves alternate between Tuam and Galway in a patchwork pattern. This situation may be explained by a number of factors: Galway's late emergence as a diocese in 1831; the unusual topography of islands, inlets and lakes; and the late population settlements on Connemara. Also, there was the influence on Annaghdown diocese, stretching across Lough Corrib. A partial rectification took place in 1890 when Galway exchanged Killannin parish for parts of Carraroe. This disturbance only formed a partial solution.

The present Archdiocese contains parts of counties Mayo, Galway and Roscommon, including Achill Island, the Aran Islands and the towns of Athenry, Ballinrobe, Castlebar, Clifden, Claremorris, Tuam and Westport.

=== Parishes ===
The 56 parishes of Tuam archdiocese are organized into eight deaneries:

Parishes in the archdiocese of Tuam
Deanery	Parish
Athenry	An Cnoc Indreabhán [Inverin]
Athenry	Annaghdown, Corandulla
Athenry	Árainn [Aran]
Athenry	Athenry
Athenry	Caherlistrane, Kilcoona
Athenry	Cummer & Kilmoylan
Athenry	Headford / Claran
Athenry	Lackagh
Ballinrobe	Ballinrobe
Ballinrobe	Clonbur and Cornamona
Ballinrobe	Cong – Cross – The Neale
Ballinrobe	Kilmaine
Ballinrobe	Leenane, Finney
Ballinrobe	Partry (Ballyovey)
Ballinrobe	Robeen
Ballinrobe	Roundfort (Kilcommon) & Robeen
Castlebar	Balla and Belcarra
Castlebar	Burriscarra-Ballintubber
Castlebar	Castlebar
Castlebar	Keelogues, Ballyvary
Castlebar	Mayo Abbey
Castlebar	Parke, Crimlin (Turlough)
Claremorris	Aghamore
Claremorris	Ballindine (Kilvine)
Claremorris	Ballyhaunis (Annagh)
Claremorris	Bekan
Claremorris	Claremorris
Claremorris	Crossboyne
Claremorris	Knock
Clifden	An Cheathrú Rua [Carraroe]
Clifden	Carna
Clifden	Clifden
Clifden	Inishbofin Island
Clifden	Letterfrack – Ballinakill
Clifden	Roundstone
Dunmore	Ballinlough (Kiltullagh)
Dunmore	Dunmore
Dunmore	Glenamaddy
Dunmore	Kilconly-Kilbannon
Dunmore	Kilkerrin – Clonberne
Dunmore	Milltown
Dunmore	Williamstown (Templetogher)
Tuam	Abbeyknockmoy
Tuam	Killererin
Tuam	Menlough-Skehana
Tuam	Moore – Clonfad
Tuam	Mountbellew – Moylough
Tuam	Tuam
Westport	Achill
Westport	Aughagower – Cushlough
Westport	Clare Island & Inishturk
Westport	Islandeady-Glenisland
Westport	Kilmeena
Westport	Louisburgh (Kilgeever)
Westport	Newport
Westport	Westport (Aughaval)

== History ==
The See is maintained in the Roman Catholic Church, but was abandoned in the Church of Ireland. Following an Act of Parliament of 1833, the See of the established church was merged with that of the Diocese of Killala and Achonry.

=== Middle Ages ===
The pre-Reformation diocese at various moments absorbed other local episcopal sees deriving from Celtic monastic jurisdictions. The diocese of Annaghdown was created c. 1179. Although not listed in Rathbreasail or Kells, Annaghdown diocese survived nonetheless for many centuries through monastic outreach from Annaghdown Abbey. Several 'bishops of Annaghdown', from 1189 to 1485, were systematically elected by its 'Cathedral Chapter' and, despite many counterclaims from Tuam, some were approved by Rome. In 1485, when the Wardenship of Galway was created, Annaghdown was formally united with Tuam by Papal decree, and some of its parishes, Claregalway, Moycullen and Shrule, were formally attached to the new wardenship.

The diocese of Mayo, though recognised officially in the Synod of Kells, was suppressed in 1202. However, bishops of Mayo were continued to be appointed as late as the 16th century. One of its bishops, Patrick O'Hely, who died in 1589, is numbered among the Irish martyr saints. The diocese was formally joined to Tuam by Papal decree in 1631.

Even after the Synod of Kells, a multiplicity of abbeys had pastoral care for the people in their surroundings. With the despoliation of the monasteries and the scarcity of priests during penal days, old churches were abandoned. When they were replaced, it was with miserable thatched shelters. House 'stations' were a necessary substitute for normal public worship.

=== Lordship of Ireland ===
Ireland's political scene and ecclesiastical was changed permanently by the coming of the Normans and the influence of the English Crown. With the English Reformation, church property was forfeited by the state and transferred to the official state religion – the Church of Ireland. Although only a winning over a minority of the people, despite the many political and economic advantages offered by conversion to the state religion, all subjects of the Crown were obliged, in their taxes to support the official state church. Additionally, the Penal Laws sought to curb or altogether extinguish the practice of the Roman Catholic religion amongst the majority population of the Archdiocese.

=== 19th and 20th centuries ===
In 1825, Archbishop Kelly testified before a House of Commons Committee of enquiry that out of 107 places of worship in the diocese, only eighteen had slated roofs. The others, he said, were thatched and wretched, insufficient to contain the congregations, and in many instances the public prayers were celebrated in the open air. The chapels were also used as Sunday schools, and a great many were used on weekdays as the local school.

As persecution abated, and as priests became more plentiful, a new confidence grew and the small thatched buildings were superseded by more solid, ample structures. Only two of the existing churches in the diocese predate 1800 - the abbeys of Ballyhaunis and Ballintubber. But from 1820 onwards, a phenomenal rate of construction began. Twenty of the 135 existing churches were constructed in the Famine years, 1840–1850. The pattern of church replacement or reconstruction continued to modern times. Modern church architecture is rare in Tuam diocese, as most churches predate modern times. The four special chapels constructed at Knock Shrine, including the Basilica, since 1972 are, however, of special importance.

Age profile of priests in the Archdiocese of Tuam, 2016.
1. Below 60 (33.0%)
2. 60-80 (47.6%)
3. 80+ (19.4%)

=== Population changes ===
In 1800 there were no more than one hundred priests in the archdiocese. The number grew steadily to 170 about 1968; despite the fact that the population dropped to less than 30% of what it was before the Famine. In 1986, the figure attending Mass in the archdiocese was approximately 75% of the whole Catholic population, or 89% of those obliged to attend Mass. This has decreased by approximately 10% in recent years. A major survey of the diocese carried out in 1996 found that the pattern of the population decline is still continuing; nowadays, however, that decline continues through out-migration to the eastern part of Ireland, but with the same deleterious effects on the west.

As of 2016, there were 103 priests in the archdiocese, with 69 over the age of 60 and 20 over the age of 80.

== Education in the diocese ==
In the 19th century, Tuam had a late start in primary education as Archbishop McHale had a great antipathy to the National School Education Acts. In nine rural areas were proselytism was a problem, he had the Third order of St. Francis of Assisi provide schools, but, on the whole, primary education was patchy. There was still much reliance on pay-schools and the efforts of local people, or on landlords, benign or otherwise. Religious-run schools were confined largely to the towns. In the 20th century, however, Tuam diocese, under Archbishop Walsh, was to the fore in the provision of secondary schools, especially in the twenty-year period before 1967, when the State made building grants and free post-primary education available. Two extra diocesan colleges were established as well as nine co-educational schools in small towns throughout the diocese, the latter managed by religious, usually in conjunction with priests of the diocese. As a result, a whole generation of pupils had the advantage of secondary education and avoided emigration as a result.

== Places of pilgrimages ==
=== Knock Shrine pilgrimage ===
Knock Shrine is the largest pilgrimage centre in Ireland, attracting pilgrims from all over the world with almost one million pilgrims per annuum.

=== Croagh Patrick pilgrimage ===
Documentary evidence associating Croagh Patrick, or 'The reek', as it is affectionately known, with St Patrick's forty days of fasting there, goes back at least to the 7th-century account of Bishop Tirecha'n. The traditional pilgrimage is mentioned in several documents from 1300 and it is certain that the pilgrimage extends back at least one thousand years.

=== Ballintubber Abbey pilgrimage ===
Ballintubber Abbey, County Mayo, founded in 1216, is unique in that it is the oldest medieval parish church in Ireland still in use.

In 1989, Tochar Phadraig, the 22-mile walking pilgrimage along the traditional pilgrim route used by St Patrick from Ballintubber to Croagh Patrick, was restored.

=== Local pilgrimages ===
- 15 August and May–October: Lady's well, Athenry, since 1249.
- 9 June: Tobar Choilmchille, Baile na hAbhann, Connemara.
- 15 July: Oilea'n Mhic Dara, Carna, Connemara.
- First Sunday of August: Patrician Shrine at Ma'me'an, Recess, Connemara.
- Garland Friday, July: Croagh Patrick - Pilgrimage for local people.
- 20 August: Pilgrimage to St Bernard's Well, Abbeyknockmoy, County Galway.
- Through the year: St Patrick's well, Kilgeever, Louisburgh, County Mayo.
- May–October: To'char Phadraig - Ballintubber Abbey to Croagh Patrick.
- May–October: Church Island, Lough Carra, part of Ballintubber pilgrimage.
- 14 November: St. Caillin's Well pilgrimage. - Ballyconneely County Galway.

== Saints ==
- Jarlath of Tuam
- Feichin of Cong
- Macdara of Carna
- Colmán of Lindisfarne
- Fursey
- Enda of Aran

== See also ==
- Archdiocese of Tuam (Church of Ireland) (The former Church of Ireland archdiocese)
- Diocese of Tuam, Killala and Achonry (The current Church of Ireland diocese)

== Books ==
- Encyclopédie d' histoire et géographie ecclésiastiques, Paris, 1927-
- Hugh Trevor-Roper, Archbishop Laud, 1940.
