= 2026 Hogan Cup =

Gaelic football competition

- Dates: 28 February – 17 March 2026
- Teams: 4

Tournament statistics
- Matches played: 3

The 2026 Hogan Cup was the 71st staging of the Hogan Cup since its establishment by the Gaelic Athletic Association in 1946. The competition ran from 28 February to 17 March 2026.

St Patrick's College, Maghera were the defending champions, however, they failed to get out of their provincial championship.

The final was played on 17 March 2026 at Croke Park in Dublin.

Coláiste Mhuire, Mullingar won their first ever Hogan Cup.

== Qualification ==
| Province | Champions |
|---|---|
| Connacht | St Gerald's College, Castlebar |
| Leinster | Coláiste Mhuire, Mullingar |
| Munster | Tralee CBS |
| Ulster | Abbey CBS, Newry |

== Results ==
=== Semi-finals ===
| 28 February 2026 Semi-final | Tralee CBS | 4-11 - 1-15 | St Gerald's College, Castlebar | TUS Midwest, Limerick |

| 28 February 2026 Semi-final | Abbey CBS, Newry | 3-12 - 1-23 | Coláiste Mhuire, Mullingar | National Sports Campus |
| | C McGrath 2-0 (pens.), D O’Rourke 1-4 (1tpf), D Carr 0-3, J O’Mahoney and D McKernan 0-2 each, F Toale 0-1. | Report | W Scahill 0-12 (3tp; 1tpf; 2f), S McWade 0-6 (1tp; 1f), P Monaghan 1-0, M Weir 0-2, F Higgins, M Moloney and S Hayes 0-1 each. | Referee: Eamon O’Connor (Offaly) |

=== Final ===
| 17 March 2026 Final | Tralee CBS | 1-16 - 3-11 | Coláiste Mhuire, Mullingar | Croke Park |
