= 2015 Hogan Cup =

- Dates: 28 March – 11 April 2015
- Teams: 4
- Sponsor: Masita
- Champions: PS Corca Dhuibhne (2nd title); Marc Ó Conchuir (captain); Brian Ó Beaglaoich (captain); Kieran Moran (manager)
- Runners-up: Roscommon CBS; Jack Casey (captain); Séamus Heneghan (manager)

Tournament statistics
- Matches played: 3
- Goals scored: 5 (1.67 per match)
- Points scored: 60 (20 per match)
- Top scorer(s): Conchuir Ó Géibheannaigh (0-12)

The 2015 Hogan Cup was the 62nd staging of the Hogan Cup since its establishment by the Gaelic Athletic Association in 1946. The competition ran from 28 March to 11 April 2015.

Pobalscoil Chorca Dhuibhne were the defending champions.

The final was played on 11 April 2015 at Croke Park in Dublin, between Pobalscoil Chorca Dhuibhne and Roscommon CBS, in what was their first ever meeting in the final. Pobalscoil Chorca Dhuibhne won the match by 1–12 to 2–05 to claim their second consecutive Hogan Cup title.

Conchuir Ó Géibheannaigh was the top scorer with 0–12.

== Qualification ==
Province	Champions
Connacht	Roscommon CBS
Leinster	Good Counsel College
Munster	Pobalscoil Chorca Dhuibhne
Ulster	St Patrick's College

== Results ==
=== Semi-finals ===
28 March 2015 Semi-final	Roscommon CBS	0-10 - 0-08	Good Counsel College	St Conleth's Park
	N Gately 0-5 (2f), R Hughes 0-3 (3f), K Whyte, C Shanagher 0-1 each.	Report	T O'Connor 0-5 (4f), J Shiely, D Joyce, J Dunne 0-1 each.	Referee: M Deegan (Laois)

28 March 2015 Semi-final	Pobalscoil Chorca Dhuibhne	1-14 - 1-11 (aet)	St Patrick's College	MacDonagh Park
	C Ó Géibheannaigh 0-7 (6f), S Ó Muircheartaigh 0-3 (2f), C Ó Bambaire 1-0, S Ó Gairbhia 0-2, B Ó Beaglaioch and PJ Mac Láimh 0-1 each.	Report	T Donohoe 0-4fs, P Smith 0-4 (3f), B Argue 1-0, D Kennedy, B Conaty and P O'Reilly 0-1 each.	Referee: F Kelly (Longford)

=== Final ===
11 April 2015 Final	Pobalscoil Chorca Dhuibhne	1-12 - 2-05	Roscommon CBS	Croke Park
	C Ó Géibheannaigh (0-5, 0-3 frees); S Ó Gairbhia (1-1); S Ó Muircheartaigh (0-2, 0-2 frees); B Ó Beaglaioch, G Ó Brosnacháin, M Ó Gormáin, C Ó Bambaire (0-1 each).		C Shanagher (2-0); R Hughes (0-3, 0-2 frees); N Gately (0-2, 0-1 free).	Referee: A Nolan (Wicklow)

== Statistics ==
=== Top scorers ===
Rank	Player	Club	Tally	Total	Matches	Average
1	Conchuir Ó Géibheannaigh	PS Chorca Dhuibhne	0-12	12	2	6.00
2	Conor Shanagher	Roscommon CBS	0-07	7	2	3.50
2	Noel Gately	Roscommon CBS	0-07	7	2	3.50
4	Seán Ó Gairbhia	PS Chorca Dhuibhne	1-03	6	2	3.00
4	Richard Hughes	Roscommon CBS	0-06	6	2	3.00
