= 2025 Hogan Cup =

Gaelic football competition

- Dates: 22 February – 17 March 2025
- Teams: 4
- Sponsor: Masita
- Champions: St Patrick's College, Maghera (6th title); Cathal McKaigue (captain); Seán Marty Lockhart, Chrissy McKaigue (manager)
- Runners-up: St Colman's College, Claremorris; Evan Ronayne (captain); Eoin O'Reilly (manager)

Tournament statistics
- Matches played: 3

The 2026 Hogan Cup was the 70th staging of the Hogan Cup since its establishment by the Gaelic Athletic Association in 1946. The competition ran from 22 February to 17 March 2025.

Omagh CBS were the defending champions, however, they failed to get out of their provincial championship.

The final was played on 11 March 2025 at Croke Park in Dublin.

St Patrick's College, Maghera won their sixth ever Hogan Cup.

== Qualification ==
Province	Champions
Connacht	St Colman's College, Claremorris
Leinster	Coláiste Mhuire, Mullingar
Munster	Mercy Secondary School, Mounthawk
Ulster	St Patrick's College, Maghera

== Results ==
=== Semi-finals ===
1 March 2025 Semi-final	St Patrick's College, Maghera	2-10 - 1-08	Mercy Mounthawk	Abbotstown
	D McGonigle 1-1, D O'Kane 1-0, G McIvor, C Óg McCloskey (1f) 0-3 each, P Haran, D O'Neill, F McShane 0-1 each.	Report	P Lane (5f, '45') 0-7, B Murphy 1-0, G Casey (1f) 0-1	Referee: I Howley (Dublin)

22 February 2025 Semi-final	St Colman's College, Claremorris	4-04 - 1-07	Coláiste Mhuire, Mullingar	Pádraig Pearses
		Report

=== Final ===
17 March 2025 Final	St Patrick's College, Maghera	2-08 - 0-04	St Colman's College, Claremorris	Croke Park
	Padraig Haran 1-1, Darragh O'Neill 1-0, Cormac Óg McCloskey 0-3, Odhran Doherty, Padraig O'Kane, Darach McGonigle, Finbarr McShane 0-1 each.	Report	Darragh Beirne (1f) 0-4	Referee: Sean Hurson (Tyrone)
