= 1970 Hogan Cup =

- Dates: 22 March – 19 April 1970
- Teams: 4
- Champions: Coláiste Chríost Rí (2nd title)
- Runners-up: St Malachy's College

Tournament statistics
- Matches played: 3
- Goals scored: 12 (4 per match)
- Points scored: 44 (14.67 per match)

The 1970 Hogan Cup was the 17th staging of the Hogan Cup since its establishment by the Gaelic Athletic Association in 1946. The competition ran from 22 March to 19 April 1970.

St Brendan's College were the defending champions, however, they were beaten in the Corn Uí Mhuirí.

The final was played on 19 April 1970 at Croke Park in Dublin, between Coláiste Chríost Rí and St Malachy's College, in what was their first ever meeting in the final. Coláiste Chríost Rí won the match by 4–05 to 1–13 to claim their second Hogan Cup title overall and a first title in two years.

== Qualification ==
Province	Champions
Connacht	St Colman's College
Leinster	Franciscan College Gormanston
Munster	Coláiste Chríost Rí
Ulster	St Malachy's College

== Results ==
=== Semi-finals ===
22 March 1970 Semi-final	St Malachy's College	4-09 - 2-06	St Colman's College	Breffni Park

22 March 1970 Semi-final	Coláiste Chríost Rí	1-05 - 0-06	Franciscan College Gormanston	Semple Stadium

=== Final ===
19 April 1970 Final	Coláiste Chríost Rí	4-05 - 1-13	St Malachy's College	Croke Park
