= 1968 Hogan Cup =

Irish football championship

- Dates: 7 April – 5 May 1968
- Teams: 4
- Champions: Coláiste Chríost Rí (1st title)
- Runners-up: Belcamp College

Tournament statistics
- Matches played: 4
- Goals scored: 10 (2.5 per match)
- Points scored: 79 (19.75 per match)

The 1968 Hogan Cup was the 15th staging of the Hogan Cup since its establishment by the Gaelic Athletic Association in 1946. The competition ran from 7 April to 5 May 1968.

St Colman's College were the defending champions, however, they were beaten by Belcamp College in the semi-final.

The final was played on 5 May 1968 at Croke Park in Dublin, between Coláiste Chríost Rí and Belcamp College, in what was their first ever meeting in the final. Coláiste Chríost Rí won the match by 3–11 to 1–10 to claim their first ever Hogan Cup title.

== Qualification ==
Province	Champions
Connacht	St Nathy's College
Leinster	Belcamp College
Munster	Coláiste Chríost Rí
Ulster	St Colman's College

== Results ==
=== Semi-finals ===
7 April 1968 Semi-final	Belcamp College	2-07 - 0-11	St Colman's College	Croke Park

7 April 1968 Semi-final	Coláiste Chríost Rí	1-07 - 1-07	St Nathy's College	O'Moore Park

28 April 1968 Semi-final replay	Coláiste Chríost Rí	2-11 - 0-15	St Nathy's College	Gaelic Grounds

=== Final ===
5 May 1968 Final	Coláiste Chríost Rí	3-11 - 1-10	Belcamp College	Croke Park
