= Pádraig Coyne =

Irish Gaelic footballer

Personal information
- Native name: Pádraig Ó Cadhain (Irish)
- Born: 9 March 1960 (age 66) Milltown, County Galway, Ireland

Sport
- Sport: Gaelic football
- Position: Goalkeeper
Club
Years	Club	Apps (scores)
1977-1992	Milltown	34 (0-0)
Club titles
- Galway titles: 1
Inter-county
- Years: County
- 1979-1984: Galway
Inter-county titles
- Connacht titles: 2
- NFL: 1

Pádraig Coyne (born 9 March 1960) is a retired Irish Gaelic footballer, who played as a goalkeeper with the Galway senior team and his local club Milltown.

Coyne attended St Colman's College, Claremorris. He helped the school win their first and only Hogan Cup in 1977, playing as full-back. Coyne won an All-Ireland Minor Football Championship with Galway in 1976, and was an All-Ireland Under 21 Football Championship runner-up in 1981 following a defeat to Cork after a replay. Coyne joined the Galway senior team the same year in 1981, winning the National Football League in his first season with the county. He played for Galway in the 1983 All-Ireland Senior Football Championship Final; however, they were beaten by Dublin. Coyne won an All-Ireland Junior Football Championship with Galway in 1985. Notably, he has played in an All-Ireland football final in every possible grade for his county.

== College ==
Pádraig Coyne lived on the Mayo border town of Milltown and attended St Colman's College, Claremorris. While there he won Connacht titles at First Year, Juvenile and Junior levels before going on to win at Senior level also, defeating close rivals St. Jarlath's College, Tuam in the 1977 final.

Centering the defence at full-back, Coyne played a role in helping Colman's to go on to the Hogan Cup final. There they met Carmelite College, Moate. Colman's managed to edge the win 1-11 to 1-10, securing their first and only Hogan Cup win.

== Inter-County ==
=== Minor and Under-21 ===
Coyne first appeared on the Galway scene as a sixteen year old minor in 1976. Galway walked their way through the Connacht Minor Final, defeating Sligo 6-16 to 3-3. In the All-Ireland final, Galway met Cork in the final whom they defeated 1-10 to 0-6.

In his second season with the minor team, Galway failed to reach the Connacht final. His third and final season in 1978 ended with Galway being defeated by Mayo in the Connacht final 2-6 to 0-4 as Coyne played at full-back.

Coyne won a Connacht Under-21 Football Championship medal in 1981 when Galway beat Mayo 0-9 to 0-8. Galway would reach the All-Ireland final facing Cork, drawing 0-14 to 2-8. The final would be a memorable one for Coyne however, as he became the first goalkeeper to score a goal in an All-Ireland final, converting from the penalty spot. Injuries plagued Galway in the replay however with Cork running out winners 2-9 to 1-6.

=== Senior ===
Coyne joined the Galway senior panel at the early age of nineteen. He achieved victory in the National Football League 1980-81 season, with Galway overcoming Roscommon in an all-Connacht final.

His first Connacht Senior Football Championship win came the following year when Galway beat Mayo 3-17 to 0-10 in the 1982 final. Galway would be beaten by eventual champions Offaly in the All-Ireland Semi-Final.

Coyne won his second Connacht Senior medal the following year with Galway beating Mayo again 1-13 to 1-10. Galway would go on to reach the 1983 All-Ireland Senior Football Championship Final but would go down to Dublin's "Dirty Dozen" in the infamous "Game of Shame". Galway had one player sent off while Dublin had three dismissed, a record for an All-Ireland Final. The game was even more forgettable for Coyne as he was famously lobbed by Barney Rock from forty yards out as Dublin won 1-10 to 1-8. It was Coyne's last championship game for Galway.

Coyne would later play for the Galway Junior team, winning an All-Ireland Junior Football Championship in 1985, completing a unique record of playing in an All-Ireland final at every grade for his county.

Pádraig Coyne has also represented Connacht in the Railway Cup.

== Club ==
Coyne made his senior championship debut for Milltown in 1977. In 1981 the North Galway side defeated St. Grellan's of Ballinasloe in the Galway Senior Football Championship final. Coyne played in three other county finals for Milltown in 1978, 1986 and 1987 but ended up on the losing side in each. He made his final championship appearance for Milltown in 1992 making 34 appearances in that time.

== Honours ==
Milltown

- Galway Senior Football Championship : (1) 1981
  - Runner-up : (3) 1978, 1986, 1987

St Colman's College, Claremorris

- Connacht Colleges Senior Football Championship : (1) 1977
- Hogan Cup : (1) 1977

Galway

- Connacht Minor Football Championship : (1) 1976
  - Runner-up : (1) 1978
- All-Ireland Minor Football Championship : (1) 1976
- Connacht Under-21 Football Championship : (1) 1981
- National Football League : (1) 1980-81
- Connacht Senior Football Championship : (2) 1982, 1983
- All-Ireland Junior Football Championship : (1) 1985
