= Pádraic Monaghan =

Irish Gaelic footballer (1959–2024

Personal information
- Native name: Pádraic Ó Muineacháin (Irish)
- Born: 3 April 1959 Scardaune, County Mayo, Ireland
- Died: 2 September 2024 (aged 65) Harold's Cross, Dublin, Ireland
- Occupation: Business consultant

Sport
- Sport: Gaelic football
- Position: Centre-back
Clubs
- Years: Club
- Garrymore; St Jude's
Club titles
- Mayo titles: 3
- Connacht titles: 1
- All-Ireland Titles: 0
College
- Years: College
- University College Galway
College titles
- Sigerson titles: 1
Inter-county
- Years: County
- Mayo
Inter-county titles
- Connacht titles: 0
- All-Irelands: 0
- NFL: 0
- All Stars: 0

Pádraic Monaghan (3 April 1959 – 2 September 2024) was an Irish Gaelic footballer and manager. He played at club level with Garrymore and at inter-county level with the Mayo senior football team. Monaghan was also involved with the St Jude's club in Dublin.

== Playing career ==
Monaghan had his first Gaelic football successes as a student at St Colman's College in Claremorris. He was part of the college's team that won the Connacht Colleges SFC title in 1977, before beating Carmelite College by 1–11 to 1–10 to win the Hogan Cup. Monaghan later lined out with the University College Galway (UCG) team during his studies there and captained UCG to the Sigerson Cup title in 1980.

At club level, Monaghan played with Garrymore. He won his first Mayo SFC medal in 1979, before claiming back-to-back titles in 1981 and 1982. He also won a Connacht Club SFC medal after a defeat of St Mary's in 1981. Monaghan was part of the Garrymore team beaten by Nemo Rangers in the 1982 All-Ireland club final.

Monaghan first appeared on the inter-county scene with Mayo as a member of the minor team that won the Connacht MFC title in 1977. He quickly progressed to the under-21 team and won a Connacht U21FC medal in his last year in the grade in 1980. Monaghan made his senior team debut in the National Football League in October 1978.

== Coaching career ==
Monaghan joined the St Jude's club in Dublin after moving there in the early 1980s. He held many coaching and administrative roles over the course of his 40-year association with the club. Monaghan coached the club to the All-County IFC title in 2020.

== Death ==
Monaghan died on 2 September 2024, at the age of 65.

== Honours ==
=== Player ===
St Colman's College

- Hogan Cup: 1977
- Connacht Colleges Senior Football Championship: 1977

University College Galway

- Sigerson Cup: 1980 (c)

Garrymore

- Connacht Senior Club Football Championship: 1981
- Mayo Senior Football Championship: 1979, 1981, 1982

Mayo

- Connacht Under-21 Football Championship: 1980
- Connacht Minor Football Championship: 1977

=== Manager ===
St Jude's

- Dublin Intermediate All-County Football Championship: 2020
