= Brian Ó Beaglaoich =

Irish Gaelic footballer

Personal information
- Native name: Brian Ó Beaglaoich (Irish)
- Born: 1996 (age 29–30) Corca Dhuibhne, County Kerry, Ireland
- Occupation: Financial consultant
- Height: 5 ft 11 in (180 cm)

Sport
- Sport: Gaelic football
- Position: Left wing-back
Clubs
- Years: Club
- An Ghaeltacht → West Kerry
Club titles
- Kerry titles: 0
College
- Years: College
- 2016-2020: University College Cork
College titles
- Sigerson titles: 1
Inter-county
- Years: County
- 2016-present: Kerry
Inter-county titles
- Munster titles: 7
- All-Irelands: 2
- NFL: 4
- All Stars: 1

Brian Ó Beaglaoich (born 1996) is an Irish Gaelic footballer. At club level he plays with An Ghaeltacht, divisional side West Kerry and at inter-county level with the Kerry senior football team.

== Career ==
Ó Beaglaoich first played Gaelic football to a high standard as a schoolboy at Pobalscoil Chorca Dhuibhne. He was part of the school team that won back-to-back Hogan Cup titles in 2014 and 2015, with Ó Beaglaoich lining out as joint-captain for the latter victory. He later played with University College Cork, and was part of the Sigerson Cup-winning team in 2019.

By that stage, Ó Beaglaoich had also progressed to adult level with the An Ghaeltacht club, having earlier enjoyed success in the under-21 grade. He won a Kerry IFC title in 2017, before later claiming a Munster Club IFC medal after a defeat of St Senan's in the final.

Ó Beaglaoich first appeared on the inter-county scene with Kerry as a member of the minor team that beat Donegal in the 2014 All-Ireland minor final. A three-year association with the under-21 team yielded a Munster U21FC medal in 2017.

Following his first season with the under-21 team, Ó Beaglaoich was drafted onto the senior team in 2016. He won the first of seven Munster SFC medals in eight seasons that year. Ó Beaglaoich was at left wing-back when Kerry were beaten by Dublin in the 2019 All-Ireland final replay. He won three consecutive National League medals from 2020 to 2022, having earlier won the title as a member of the extended panel in 2017. Ó Beaglaoich won an All-Ireland SFC medal after a defeat of Galway in the 2022 final.

== Honours ==
Pobalscoil Chorca Dhuibhne

- Hogan Cup: 2014, 2015 (jc)
- Corn Uí Mhuirí: 2014, 2015

University College Cork

- Sigerson Cup: 2019

An Ghaeltacht

- West Kerry Senior Football Championship: 2015, 2017
- Munster Intermediate Club Football Championship: 2017
- Kerry Intermediate Football Championship: 2017

Kerry

- All-Ireland Senior Football Championship (2): 2022, 2025
- Munster Senior Football Championship (9): 2016, 2017, 2018, 2019, 2021, 2022, 2023, 2024, 2025
- National Football League (5): 2017, 2020, 2021, 2022, 2025
- Munster Under-21 Football Championship: 2017
- All-Ireland Minor Football Championship: 2014
- Munster Minor Football Championship: 2014
