= St Colman's College =

St. Colman's College may refer to:

- St Colman's College, Claremorris, a boys secondary school in County Mayo, Ireland
- St Colman's College, Fermoy, a boys secondary school in County Cork, Ireland
- St Colman's College, Newry, a boys secondary school in County Down, Northern Ireland
