= St Mel's College =

School in Longford town, Ireland

- Coláiste Naomh Mel
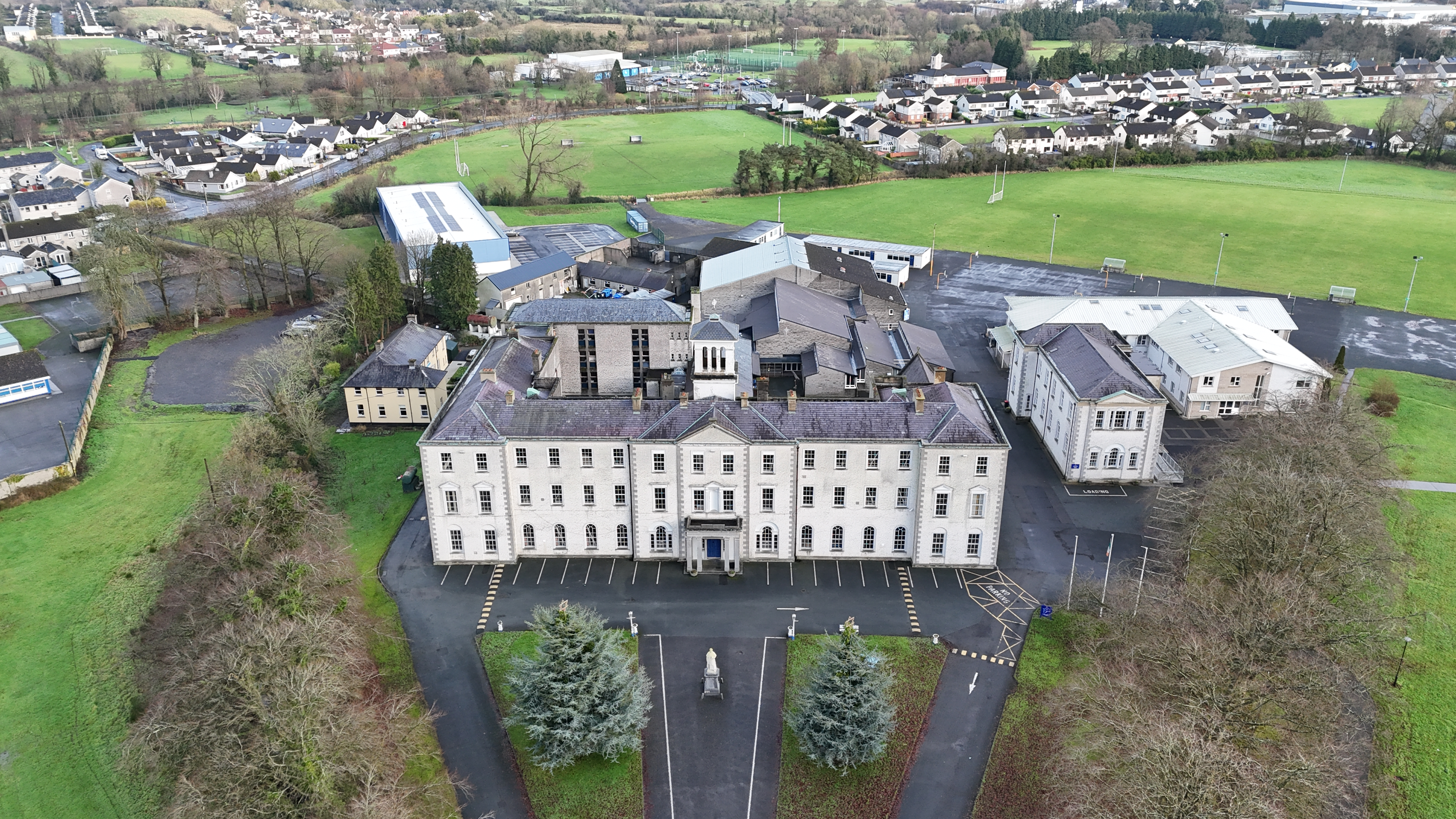
- St Mel's College in 2024
- Longford, County Longford; Ireland

Information
- Religious affiliation: Roman Catholic
- Established: 1865
- Principal: Malachy Flanagan
- Gender: Boys
- Trustee: Catholic Education an Irish Schools Trust School
- Website: http://www.stmelscollege.ie/

St Mel's College was an all-boys secondary school in Longford, Ireland.

In November 2024, plans were announced to merge the school with the local all-girls secondary school, Scoil Mhuire, Longford, to form a new co-educational school to be known as Coláiste Mel agus Mhuire.

== History ==
The college opened in September 1865 with 48 boarders and 20 dayboys. The architect was Than Ourke with a total cost of 16,000 euro. In the beginning, it was actually a seminary, where students studied to become priests. Fr. James Reynolds was the first president. Previously he had been Superior of St Mel's Day School in the Market Square. The school shares its name with St Mel's Cathedral in Longford and it is situated to the rear of the cathedral. The cathedral and the college are named after Saint Mél of Ardagh.

St Mel's was originally a boarding school since its foundation, later becoming a day school. Due to financial implications and decreasing demand for boarding schools it stopped taking in boarders in the early 2000s.

== Sports ==
St Mel's won its first All Ireland Senior Final, beating St Patrick's College, Cavan in Croke Park by 4-7 to 3-3. The college has won the All Ireland Schools Gaelic football championship the Hogan Cup in 1948, 1962, 1963, and 1987 (they also were runners-up in 1961 and 1988). They hold the record for the most wins, 29, in the Leinster Colleges Senior Football Championship. St Mel's have an all-weather pitch provided by PST Sport. In February 2020, it was announced that Longford Athletics Club and the College would build an Indoor facility on the college grounds.

== Past pupils ==
- Willie Browne (1936–2004), Republic of Ireland international footballer
- Micheál Carrigy, Senator elected 2020
- Conor Connelly (1975–2020), Gaelic footballer
- James Patrick Farrell (1865–1921), Nationalist MP for Cavan 1895–1900 and North Longford 1900–1918
- Ray Flynn (b. 1957), athlete
- Rev. Joseph Guinan (1863–1932), priest, teacher (at St Mel's) and novelist
- John Leydon (1895–1979), civil servant, involved in setting up Aer Lingus, IMI and IPA
- Pádraic McCormack, former TD for Galway West and Senator
- Ryan McKiernan, managing director of Fat Macy's Foundation
- Bishop James Moynagh S.P.S. (1903–1985), missionary priest and bishop to Nigeria
- Liam Mulvihill, former director general of the GAA
- Declan Nerney, Irish country singer
- Ruairí Ó Brádaigh, Former TD (1957–1961), President of Sinn Féin (1970–1983), President of Republican Sinn Féin (1987–2009)
- Bishop Colm O'Reilly, Bishop of the Roman Catholic Diocese of Ardagh and Clonmacnoise
- John Wilson (1923–2007), TD for Cavan Monaghan and government minister
