= Conor Connelly =

Irish Gaelic footballer (1975–2020)

Personal information
- Native name: Conchúr Ó Conghaile (Irish)
- Born: 1975 Creggs, County Roscommon, Ireland
- Died: 28 March 2020 (aged 44) Ballycumber, County Offaly, Ireland
- Occupation: Solicitor

Sport
- Sport: Gaelic football
- Position: Right wing-forward
Clubs
- Years: Club
- Creggs; Michael Glaveys; St Jude's; Ballycumber
College
- Years: College
- University College Dublin
Inter-county
- Years: County
- 1995–2003: Roscommon
Inter-county titles
- Connacht titles: 1
- All-Irelands: 0
- NFL: 0

Conor Connelly (1975 – 28 March 2020) was an Irish Gaelic footballer who played at club level with Creggs, Michael Glaveys, St Jude's and Ballycumber and at inter-county level with the Roscommon senior football team. He usually lined out as a right wing-forward.

== Honours ==
St Mel's College

- Leinster Colleges Senior Football Championship (1): 1994

Roscommon

- Connacht Senior Football Championship (1): 2001
- Connacht Minor Football Championship (1): 1992
