= Belcamp House =

Georgian house and former school in Dublin, Ireland

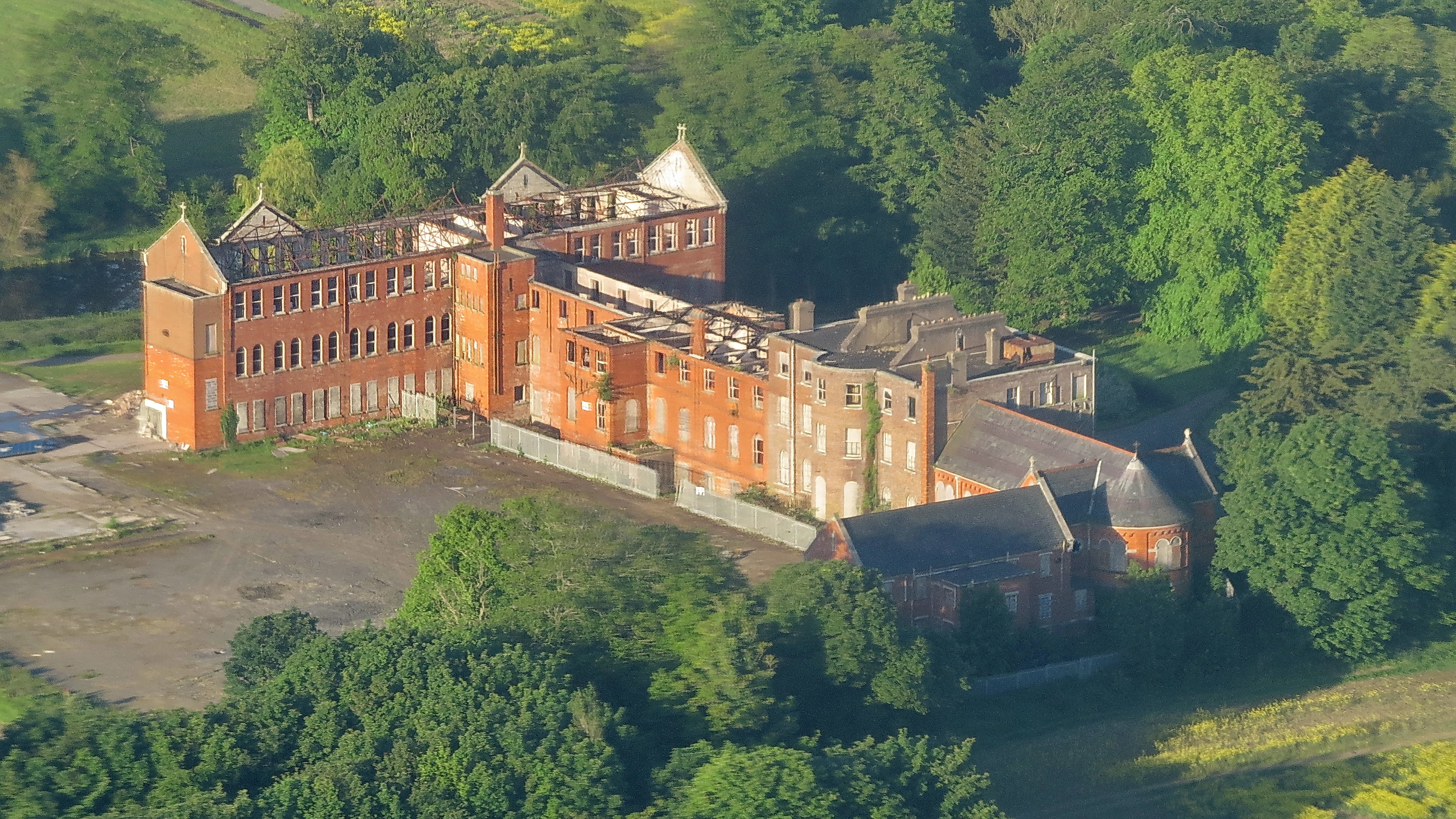
- Belcamp House in 2015

- Location within Dublin
- Alternative names: Belcamp Hall

General information
- Status: Derelict
- Type: Former House and school
- Architectural style: Georgian
- Location: Coolock, Dublin 17, Ireland
- Coordinates: 53.407597°N 6.187444°W
- Estimated completion: Main house (1785); School buildings (early 1900s)

Technical details
- Material: Red brick, rusticated granite
- Floor count: 3

Design and construction
- Architect: James Hoban
- Developer: Sir Edward Newenham

Website
- www.belcamp.ie

Belcamp House (sometimes Belcamp Hall) is a Georgian house and former school, situated within a substantial estate off the Malahide Road in Balgriffin in the northern suburbs of Dublin, Ireland. The house is usually attributed to the architect James Hoban, who also designed the White House in Washington, D.C., with a similar Oval Office utilising the bow back of the building.

== History ==
=== Construction ===
The house was built around 1785 possibly to the design of James Hoban, for the Burton family and Sir Edward Newenham, a member of the Irish parliament, and an ardent supporter of the Republican Party in the United States, who corresponded with George Washington. Newenham had earlier leased 37 acres at Belcamp in 1765.

=== Belcamp College ===
The college was established in 1893 as a juniorate for the Oblate Fathers, and became a boarding school for boys. School facilities were built onto the original house but the original house still stands intact today. St Mary's Chapel was added to the complex in the early 1900s, and a two-storey red-brick accommodation wing. The chapel was adorned by 12 stained glass windows by Harry Clarke. In 1972 the historic Belcamp Hall was placed on the protected structures list.

==== Alumni ====
The actor Brendan Gleeson worked as an English and Irish teacher in Belcamp. The golfer Philip Walton, the actor Tony Doyle and the theologian and writer Thomas Groome were pupils at the school. Another former student at Belcamp was Fr Stewart Joseph Phelan OMI, who served as Navy chaplain in the Great War on HMS Black Prince; he was lost at sea at the Battle of Jutland in 1916. Winner of eight All Ireland Senior Hurling medals with Kilkenny, Frank Cummins was a student at the college, he also helped Belcamp win the Leinster Colleges football final in 1965.

==== Sport ====
The school produced some successful Gaelic football sides, winning the GAA Secondary Schools, Leinster Colleges Senior Football Championship in 1921, 1965, 1967 and 1968, and twice runners-up in the All-Ireland Schools final (for the Hogan Cup). Father Tom Scully, who taught mathematics, trained Belcamp's team to the three 1960s Leinster Schools' Football Championships.

=== After the school ===
The house was much damaged by vandals and fire following the closure of the school in 2004 when it was sold to property developer Gerry Gannon. Eventually the property fell under the control of NAMA. After 2011, the developer and the local authority did work to secure the premises more actively, but much loss had already occurred.

Planning permission was granted for the conversion of the main house into apartments, with a restaurant and childcare facility in one wing, and for 165 homes on the surrounding 15 hectares. Further housing proposals, including for five blocks of apartments, were to follow. An Taisce was supportive of the plans, while the Irish Georgian Society and some local residents had concerns about the historic building and public rights of way on parts of the land.

As of the summer of 2018, the lands were in development. Gannon Homes at one time planned up to 2,000 residential units, but only a few hundred have yet been considered for planning permission.

== Elements ==
=== Belcamp Hall ===
The house was based on a similar model to the White House in Washington, and it included an "oval office". It is a three-storey over basement, seven-bay structure with a rusticated granite ground floor facade.

=== Walled garden ===
Northwest of and behind the Hall is a walled garden. Now in poor repair, it once supplied the house with fruit and vegetables.

=== Washington monument ===
A castellate monument was erected for George Washington, possibly the first such in the world.

=== River, ponds and woods ===
The estate features woodland and rolling grounds, and the at-times steep-sided valley of the Turnapin or Mayne. The Turnapin Stream, one of the two main branches of the Mayne River, and often referred to by the river's name, runs through the property south of the house and other buildings, and is dammed to form two ponds, simply called the Upper and Lower Pond, and with weirs to regulate the water flow.
