= Mageean Cup =

Ulster Colleges' Senior Hurling Championship

- Irish: Corn Mhic Giotháin
- Code: Hurling
- Founded: 1963
- Region: Ulster (GAA)
- First winner: St MacNissi's College
- Most titles: St Mary's Christian Brothers' Grammar School, Belfast (28 titles)
- Sponsors: Danske Bank
- TV partner(s): BBC, The Irish News, Jerome Quinn Media
- Official website: www.danskebankulsterschoolsgaa.com/hurling/

The Mageean Cup is awarded annually to the winners of the Ulster Colleges' Senior Hurling Championship. The trophy was presented to Ulster Colleges in 1963 by the staff and students of Dromantine College, Newry in memory of Most Reverend Daniel Mageean, Bishop of Down and Connor (1929 – 1962). St Mary's CBGS Belfast are the cup specialists with 28 titles. The cup has spent most of its time in the Belfast school with only St Patricks Maghera challenging their dominance.

The Mageean Cup champions go on to represent Ulster each Spring in the All Ireland B Championship (The Paddy Buggy Cup “Formerly O’ Keeffe Cup”), and the Ulster champions have created a remarkable record in the past 4 years. St Mary's CBGS won the O'Keefe Cup in 1971 and 1973, but there was no further Ulster success in the next 30 years until St Patrick's Maghera ended the drought in 2007. In 2009 Cross & Passion Ballycastle initiated a remarkable run of 4 consecutive O'Keefe Cups for Ulster. They retained their title in 2010, Maghera collected their second in 2011, and St Mary's CBGS took their total to 3 in March 2012.

== Finals listed by year ==
Year	Winner	County	Opponent	County	Venue	Captain	Man of the Match
2025/26	St. Patrick's College, Maghera	Derry	Cross & Passion, Ballycastle	Antrim	QUB Arena, Belfast	Rian Collins	Rian Collins
2024/25	Cross and Passion Ballycastle	Antrim	St Killian's College Garron Tower	Antrim	QUB Arena, Belfast	Liam Glackin	Oisin McCallin
2023/24	St Killian's College Garron Tower	Antrim	Cross and Passion Ballycastle	Antrim	QUB Arena, Belfast	Joe McLaughlin	Cormac McKeown
2022/23	St Louis Grammar School, Ballymena	Antrim	St Killian's College Garron Tower	Antrim	QUB Arena, Belfast	Aodhan McGarry & Ronan McCollum	Aodhan McGarry
2021/22	St Patrick's, Downpatrick	Down	St. Patrick's College, Maghera	Derry	QUB Arena, Belfast	Deaglan Mallon	Deaglan Mallon
2020/21	No competition due to Covid 19						
2019/20	Cross & Passion, Ballycastle	Antrim	St. Mary's CBGS, Belfast	Antrim	QUB Arena, Belfast	Seamus McAuley	
2018/19	An Dun	Down	St. Patrick's College, Maghera	Derry	QUB Arena, Belfast	Ciaran Watson	
2017/18	St. Patrick's College, Maghera	Derry	An Dun	Down	QUB Arena, Belfast	Feargal Ó Caiside	Richie Mullan
2016/17	St. Mary's CBGS, Belfast	Antrim	St Killian's College Garron Tower	Antrim	QUB Arena, Belfast	CJ/Ciaran McKenna	
2015/16	St Louis Grammar School, Ballymena	Antrim	St. Mary's CBGS, Belfast	Antrim	QUB Arena, Belfast	Cathal McMullan	
2014/15	Cross and Passion, Ballycastle	Antrim	An Dun	Down	QUB Arena, Belfast	Paddy Joe Graham	
2013/14	Cross and Passion Ballycastle	Antrim	St. Patrick's College, Maghera	Derry	QUB Arena, Belfast	Ryan McCambridge	
2012/13	St. Mary's CBGS, Belfast	Antrim	An Dun	Down	Casement Park	Ruairi Wilson	
2011/12	St. Mary's CBGS, Belfast	Antrim	Cross and Passion, Ballycastle	Antrim	Casement park	Tommy Manning	
2010/11	St. Patrick's College, Maghera	Derry	St. Mary's CBGS, Belfast	Antrim	Casement Park	Karl McKaigue	Shane Farren
2009/10	Cross & Passion, Ballycastle	Antrim				Matthew Donnelly	
2008/09	Cross & Passion, Ballycastle	Antrim				Conor Laverty	
2007/08	St. Mary's CBGS, Belfast	Antrim	Cross & Passion, Ballycastle	Antrim	Casement Park, Belfast	Eamann Herron	
2006/07	Cross & Passion, Ballycastle	Antrim	St. Patrick's College, Maghera	Derry	Corrigan Park, Belfast		
2005/06	St. Patrick's College, Maghera	Derry	St. MacNissi's, Garron Tower	Antrim	Casement Park		
2004/05	St. Patrick's College, Maghera	Derry	St. Mary's CBGS, Belfast	Antrim	Corrigan Park		
2003/04	St. Patrick's College, Maghera	Derry	St. Mary's CBGS, Belfast	Antrim	Dunloy	Mark Lynch	
2002/03	St. Mary's CBGS, Belfast	Antrim			Corrigan Park, Belfast	Michael Herron	
2001/02	St. Patrick's College, Maghera	Derry					
2000/01	St. Patrick's College, Maghera	Derry					
1999/00	St. Mary's CBGS, Belfast	Antrim					
1998/99	St. Mary's CBGS, Belfast	Antrim					
1997/98	St. Mary's CBGS, Belfast	Antrim					
1996/97	St. Mary's CBGS, Belfast	Antrim					
1995/96	St. Mary's CBGS, Belfast	Antrim					
1994/95	Cross & Passion, Ballycastle	Antrim					
1993/94	Cross & Passion, Ballycastle	Antrim					
1992/93	St. Patrick's College, Maghera	Derry					
1991/92	St. Patrick's College, Maghera	Derry					
1990/91	St. Mary's CBGS, Belfast	Antrim				John Hamill	
1989/90	St. Patrick's College, Maghera	Derry	Cross & Passion, Ballycastle	Antrim	Newbridge		
1988/89	St Louis Grammar School, Ballymena	Antrim	St Mary's CBGS, Belfast	Antrim	McAllister & McVeigh Park, Glenariffe	Declan Heggarty	
