= Joseph Guinan =

Irish Roman Catholic priest, teacher, and novelist

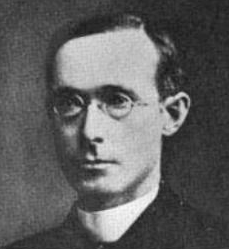
- Born: 1863; King's County, Ireland
- Died: 1932 (aged 68–69)
- Education: St. Mel's College
- Occupations: Clergyman, writer

Joseph Guinan (1863–1932) was an Irish Roman Catholic priest, teacher and novelist.

== Biography ==
Joseph Guinan was born in King's County (now County Offaly) in 1863. He was educated at St. Mel's College, Longford, before going to St. Patrick's College, Maynooth to train as a priest. He was ordained by Batholmew Woodcock for the Diocese of Ardagh and Clonmacnoise. He served as a curate in Liverpool, returning to Ireland to teach English, Religion and Mathematics in St. Mel's College. Due to ill health he left teaching, and he was appointed parish priest of Bornacoola, County Leitrim, in 1910. He contributed the article on Henry Essex Edgeworth to the Catholic Encyclopedia. While in Dromod, County Longford in 1920 he was made a canon of the Catholic Church.

== Works ==
- The Soggarth Aroon by Rev. Joseph Guinan, Published by The Talbot Press Limited (1944)
- Scenes and Sketches in an Irish Parish or Priest and People in Doon by Rev. Joseph Guinan, Published by Dublin, Gill, Dublin (1910).
- The Moores of Glynn by Rev. Joseph Guinan. Published by Washbourne/Gill, London/Dublin (1907)
- Donal Kenny by Rev. Joseph Guinan, R. & T. Washbourne, Ltd., London, 1910.
