= George McDermot =

Irish lawyer and Catholic priest

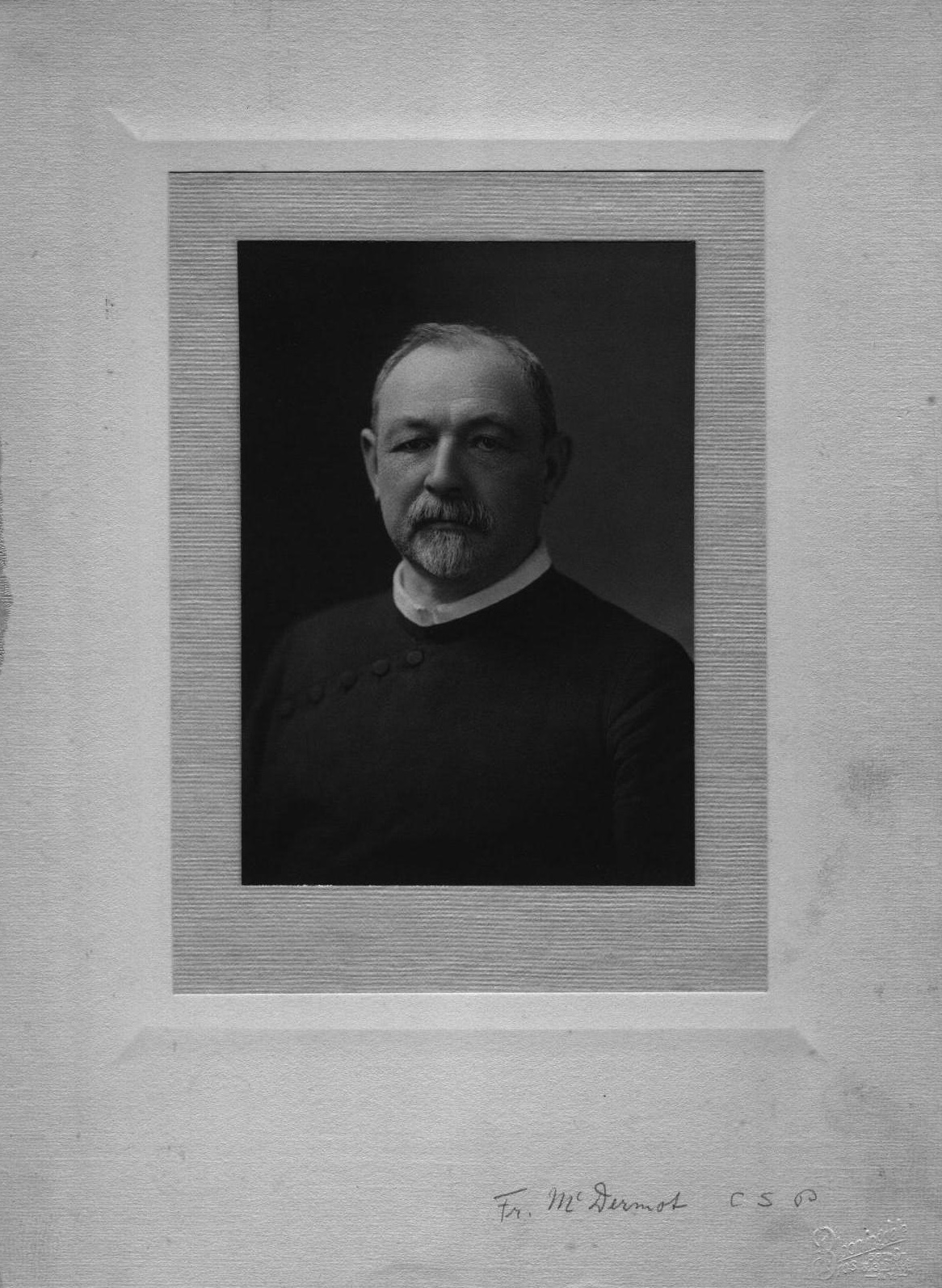
- George McDermot as a Paulist priest circa 1900
- Born: May 20, 1841; Castlerea, Co. Roscommon, Ireland
- Died: December 11, 1917 (aged 76); San Francisco, US
- Occupations: Lawyer, writer, poet, priest
- Years active: 1864-1912
- Known for: Political activism, legal writings, poetry, scholarly articles
- Notable work: The Land Law Act (Ireland) 1881 and Landlord and Tenant Act 1870 with rules to both acts...the Landlord and Tenant Law Amendment Act 1860; the Irish Church Act Amendment (1881) and a consolidated index to the Acts and Rules

George McDermot (20 May 1841 – 11 December 1917). was an Irish lawyer, writer and poet, and Catholic priest. He was an investigator and judge under the Arrears of Rent (Ireland) Act 1882.

== Biography ==
George McDermot was born on 20 May 1841 in Castlerea, Co. Roscommon, Ireland, the son of Edward McDermot, a merchant and Kate McGreevy. He attended St. Jarlath's Diocesan College, Tuam, Co. Galway and graduated from Trinity College Dublin with the degree of B.A. in 1864. He studied law at the King's Inns Dublin and Middle Temple London. He was a practising barrister-at-law on the Western Circuit for several years and a sometime judge under the Arrears of Rent (Ireland) Act 1882. In the late 1880s he gave up a successful legal career in Ireland and went to New York, where he joined the Paulist Order, taking Holy Orders in 1894. He served in parishes in New York from 1894 to 1910. He retired in 1912 and went to live in San Francisco. He died there on 11 December 1917.

== Political views ==
He was a member of the Irish Nationalist Party, which sought Home Rule for Ireland, and was president of his local branch association in Castlerea. The Nation reported on a speech he delivered in February 1872.

We observe by the Roscommon Messenger that a large and enthusiastic meeting was held on the 19th ult. in Castlerea, in support of the Home Rule movement, and that Mr George McDermot B.L., President of the local branch Association, delivered on the occasion an exhaustive, able and eloquent address - in which he recounted in forcible terms the loss and misery which the Union has brought upon Ireland, pointed out the manner in which Irish business is neglected in the House of Commons, and gave convincing proofs of the benefits which the federal arrangement would confer as well on the English people as on all classes of Irishmen.

— The Dublin Weekly Nation, Issue 16th March, 1872

He joined the Irish National League, founded by C.S. Parnell, in 1885.

== Published works ==
As a lawyer, his best-known work was an authoritative book on the Land Law (Ireland) Act 1881 and related acts including the Irish Church Act Amendment Act 1881. This ran to a second edition published in November 1881. He also contributed poems in his youth to The Nation, an Irish weekly newspaper. He published the following scholarly articles contributed to the Catholic World (CW), The North American Review (NAR), American Journal of Sociology (AJS) and The American Catholic Quarterly Review (ACQR) between 1890 and 1910

- The Official Class in Ireland (December 1890, CW)
- Home Rule in Ireland Two Hundred and Fifty Years Ago (March 1891, CW)
- A Reply to Mr. Lecky (1891, NAR)
- The Irish Tories and Irish Local Government (March 1892, CW)
- Home Rule and the General Election (May 1892, CW)
- Home Rule or Egotism (September 1892, CW)
- Taxation in Ulster under A Home Rule Parliament (December 1892, CW)
- The Minority in Ulster under Home Rule (March 1893, CW)
- The Ann Arbor Strike and the Law of Hiring (February 1894, CW)
- The Gobhan Saer (October 1894, CW)
- The Dual Ownership of Land in Ireland A Myth (November 1894, CW)
- The Pullman Strike Commission (February 1895, C.W)
- Centenary of Maynooth College (May 1895, CW)
- An Introduction to the Study of Society (September 1895, CW)
- The Church and the New Sociology (December 1895, CW)
- The Great Assassin and the Christians of Armenia (December 1896, CW)
- A Note on the Term “Social Evolution” (1896, AJS)
- Dwellings of the Poor and Their Morality (February 1897, CW)
- Public Opinion and Improved Housing (Mary 1897, CW)
- Dante's Theory of Papal Politics (June 1897, CW)
- Edmund Burke, the Friend of Human Liberty (July 1897, CW)
- “Farthest North” By Dr. Nansen (August 1897, CW)
- The French Expedition to Ireland in 1798 (October 1897, CW)
- Ancestor Worship the Origin of Religion (October 1897, CW)
- Dr. Benson on the Primacy of Jurisdiction (November 1897, CW)
- Unpublished Letters of Napoleon (December 1897, CW)
- The Ruins and Excavations of Ancient Rome (January 1898, CW)
- Socialism, Altruism and the Labor Question (February 1898, CW)
- “The Diary of Master William Silence” (March 1898, CW)
- The Huguenots (April 1898, CW)
- Henryk Sienkiewicz (May 1898, CW)
- Rationalism and the English Church (June 1898, CW)
- Gladstone and His Critics (August 1898, CW)
- Mr. Chamberlain's Foreign Policy and the Dreyfus Case (September 1898, CW)
- Prince Bismarck (September 1898, CW)
- The Anglo-American Alliance and the Irish Americans (October 1898, CW)
- Hamlet's Madness and German Criticism (November 1898, CW)
- Irish Local Government Act (December 1898, CW)
- Irish University Education (1898, ACQR)
- The Papacy in the Nineteenth Century (January 1899, CW)
- The End of the Century and the Italian Revolution (February 1899, CW)
- English Administrators and the Ceded Possessions (March 1899, CW)
- The Press and the Next Conclave (May 1899, CW)
- Cyrano de Bergerac (May 1899, CW)
- Markham: A Mischievous Pessimist (June 1899, CW)
- The Celtic Revival (July 1899, CW)
- The South African Republic (October 1899, CW)
- Mr. Mallock on the Church and Science (January 1900, CW)
- The Church in the Early Years of Henry VIII (March 1900, CW)
- Chair of Philosophy in Trinity College Washington D.C. (June 1900, CW)
- Cromwell and Liberty (July 1900, CW)
- President Eliot's Address at Tremont Temple (October 1900, CW)
- Lord Russell of Killowen (1900, ACQR)
- The Irish Policy of Cromwell and the Commonwealth (1901, ACQR)
- Spencer's Philosophy (1901, ACQR)
- Descartes and the Philosophy of the French Revolution (1903, ACQR)
- Land Purchase in Ireland (1903, ACQR)
- Home Rule and Mr. Chamberlain's Zollverein (1903, ACQR)
- Irish Catholics, English Dissenters and the Education Act (1904, ACQR)
- The Situation in Ireland: The Landlords and the Cattle Drivers (1908, ACQR)
- England and the Sultan (1909, ACQR)
- Anarchism in India and its Consequences (1909, ACQR)
- The Suppression of the Templars An Expediency (1909, ACQR)
- Sir Robert Anderson's “Parnellism and Crime” (1910, ACQR)
- Senor Ferrer and the Anarchists Again (1910, ACQR)
