= 1946 Hogan Cup =

- Dates: 8 April – 5 May 1946
- Teams: 4
- Champions: St Patrick's Grammar School (1st title); Pat O'Neill (captain)
- Runners-up: St Jarlath's College

Tournament statistics
- Matches played: 3
- Goals scored: 16 (5.33 per match)
- Points scored: 50 (16.67 per match)

The 1946 Hogan Cup was the inaugural staging of the Hogan Cup. While provincial championships had been played in Connacht, Leinster, Munster and Ulster since the 1920s, this was the first time that the four champions faced each other in an All-Ireland series.

The final was played on 5 May 1946 at Croke Park in Dublin, between St Patrick's Grammar School and St Jarlath's College, in what was their first ever meeting in the final. St Patrick's Grammar School won the match by 3–11 to 4–07 to claim their first ever Hogan Cup title.

== Qualification ==
Province	Champions
Connacht	St Jarlath's College
Leinster	St Mel's College
Munster	St Brendan's College
Ulster	St Patrick's Grammar School

== Results ==
=== Semi-finals ===
8 April 1946 Semi-final	St Brendan's College	2-04 - 2-14	St Jarlath's College	FitzGerald Stadium

8 April 1946 Semi-final	St Patrick's Grammar School	3-07 - 2-07	St Mel's College	Breffni Park

=== Final ===
5 May 1946 Final	St Patrick's Grammar School	3-11 - 4-07	St Jarlath's College	Croke Park
