= St Patrick's Classical School =

School in County Meath, Ireland

Coordinates: 53.6524°N 6.6980°W

- Scoil Chlasaiceach Naomh Pádraig
- Moatlands, Navan, County Meath

Information
- Motto: In Christo Confido; Latin for "I believe in Christ"
- Denomination: Roman Catholic
- Established: 1930
- Principal: Harry McGarry
- Faculty: c. 78
- Gender: Boys
- Enrollment: c. 908
- Colours: Black, gold
- Patron: Thomas Deenihan, Bishop of Meath
- Website: www.stpatscs.com/

St Patrick's Classical School (Irish: Gréasáin Scoil Chlasaceach Naomh Pádraig) is a Roman Catholic-run school for boys in Navan, County Meath. It has produced a number of politicians, journalists, Irish sports personalities, broadcasters and two winners of the Perrier Comedy Award at the Edinburgh Fringe.

== History ==
St Patrick's Classical School was founded in 1930 when the Diocese of Meath's seminary, St. Finian's College, which had previously been the main provider of denominational education for boys locally, moved from Navan to the new diocesan capital, Mullingar in County Westmeath. The school's patron is the Roman Catholic Bishop of Meath. The school was previously located in a small building on Academy Street in the centre of the town, but in 1970 it moved to a new campus at the outskirts of the town.

As its name indicated, it placed an emphasis on the teaching of the classics, Latin and Greek, rather than vocational subjects. Until the granting of "free education" by the Irish Minister for Education, Brian Lenihan (his predecessor who proposed free education, Donogh O'Malley died before he could implement the plan), the school operated as a fee-paying school. Its education is now free. Though predominantly Roman Catholic, the school also has pupils of other religions and no religion.

Although the Roman Catholic Bishop of Meath remains the school patron, the school has long been under lay control and the last member of the clergy that was principal of the school was Fr Michael Sheerin in 1988. The school no longer has any priest on its teaching staff.

In March 2013, the Irish Independent newspaper published a "lifestyle" article in which the writer described St Patrick's Classical School as the town's "most prestigious" secondary school, which runs a waiting list of more than 200 students.

In 2015, the school completed the construction of several new classrooms and an additional storey. These rooms were designed to accommodate science, woodwork, and music classes.

== Notable staff ==
- Former principal Colm O'Rourke, former member of the Meath county football team and panelist on Gaelic games coverage on RTÉ
- Shane O'Rourke, footballer son of Colm, physical education
- Ronan Moore, writer, politician

== Notable past pupils ==
Among the school's ex-pupils are James Tully, the Labour Party Deputy Leader and Irish government minister in the 1970s and early 1980s; Jim Fitzsimons, a longtime Fianna Fáil Member of the European Parliament; Jim Duffy, a journalist; Simon Cumbers, a broadcast journalist killed by al-Qaeda in 2004; David Beggy, a Gaelic footballer turned rugby player; David Gough, that sport's first openly gay elite referee; comedians Dylan Moran, Tommy Tiernan and Michael Fry, and Irish radio and television presenter Hector Ó hEochagáin. The school was also attended by the trance DJ and producer John O'Callaghan.

Ham Sandwich members Brian Darcy and John Moore met while attending the school.

== Sporting activities ==
Sporting facilities at the school include two full sized Gaelic football pitches, one full size astro-turf pitch, a sports arena, a sports hall, a table tennis room, and a weights gym.

Sport has been played at St Patrick's since the foundation of the school.

=== Gaelic football ===
The senior Gaelic football team has won the Hogan Cup (All Ireland Schools "A" competition) three times, in 2000, 2001 and 2004. The current coaches include Colm O'Rourke. The juvenile football team won the North Leinster Juvenile Championship 2011 against St Mary's School in Mullingar, and the Junior team also won a "Leinster Junior A Title" in 2011/2012.

In the 2012/2013 season the senior team won the Leinster final and in the All-Ireland final in April 2013 it lost to St Patrick's of Maghera.

=== Rugby ===
In 2010, the junior rugby team won the Junior Duff Cup against Skerries Community School. In 2012, the junior rugby team won the Division A league and Junior Duff cup for the first time.

=== Basketball ===
The U-19s and U-16s basketball teams both made it to the north-east regional finals in 2011/2012. The U-19s won their final but were knocked out in the qualifiers for the All-Ireland. The U-16s lost their final but were able to advance to All-Ireland qualifiers but were knocked out.

The u-16 basketball team in 2019 won an all Ireland national cup in the National stadium, beating Crosshaven from County Cork.

== Charity work ==
In 2014, five students from 5th year raised €1300 for the Donal Walsh #LiveLife Foundation by selling wristbands in honour of County Kerry teenager Donal Walsh, who had terminal cancer.

In 2019 they also organised a sleep out to raise money for Focus Ireland.

== See also ==
- Education in the Republic of Ireland
