= Coláiste Muire Máthair =

Secondary school in Galway, Ireland

Location
- St Mary's Road; Galway, H91 H7F8; Ireland; 53°16′16″N 9°04′01″W

Information
- Former name: St. Mary's College
- Type: Voluntary
- Motto: Irish: Cineáltas Misneach Meas (Kindness Courage Respect)
- Religious affiliations: Roman Catholic; Diocesan college
- Established: 1912; 114 years ago
- Principal: Claire Mac Loughlin
- Gender: Co-educational
- Age: 12 to 18
- Enrollment: approx. 800 (2026)
- Colours: Purple; Yellow
- Website: cmmg.ie

Coláiste Muire Máthair (English: Mother Mary College) is a co-educational secondary school, located on St. Mary's Road in Galway, Ireland. Founded in 1912, it is a diocesan college. The main school building is included on the Record of Protected Structures maintained by Galway City Council. As of 2026, the school had approximately 760 pupils enrolled.

== History ==
It was founded in 1912 as the junior seminary of the Roman Catholic Galway and Kilmacduagh dioceses. St Mary's College retains the status of diocesan college although it ended its boarding provision in 1999. The college currently caters to approximately 400 students, offering a wide and varied range of curricular subjects and many co-curricular and extra-curricular activities.

The school celebrated its centennial in 2012, celebrating the completion of its main building in March 1912. The building is faced with granite and limestone, the two predominant stones of County Galway's geology.

=== Merger ===
St Mary's College merged with Our Lady's College, Galway to become Coláiste Muire Máthair a co-educational secondary school in September 2021. Following the merger with Our Lady's College, the school's enrolment has risen to over 1,000 students.

== Notable alumni ==
=== Sport ===
- Séamus McHugh, Gaelic footballer
- Fergal Moore, hurler
- Stephen O'Donnell, former footballer for Falkirk and Dundalk; current assistant manager for Bohemians
- Joe Connolly, all-Ireland winning hurler
- Paul Conroy, Gaelic footballer
- Vinny Faherty, former footballer for Galway United and St Patrick's Athletic
- Tadhg Haran, hurler
- Gareth Bradshaw, Gaelic footballer
- Tony Óg Regan, hurler

=== Arts and media ===
- Mick Lally, actor

=== Politics ===
- Seán Kyne, Fine Gael TD for Galway West
- Noel Grealish, independent TD for Galway West and Minister of State
- Derek Nolan, former Labour Party TD
- Frank Fahey, former Fine Gael TD and Minister for the Marine and Natural Resources

=== Other ===
- James McLoughlin, former Bishop of Galway

== See also ==
- List of schools in the Republic of Ireland
