= St Jarlath's College =

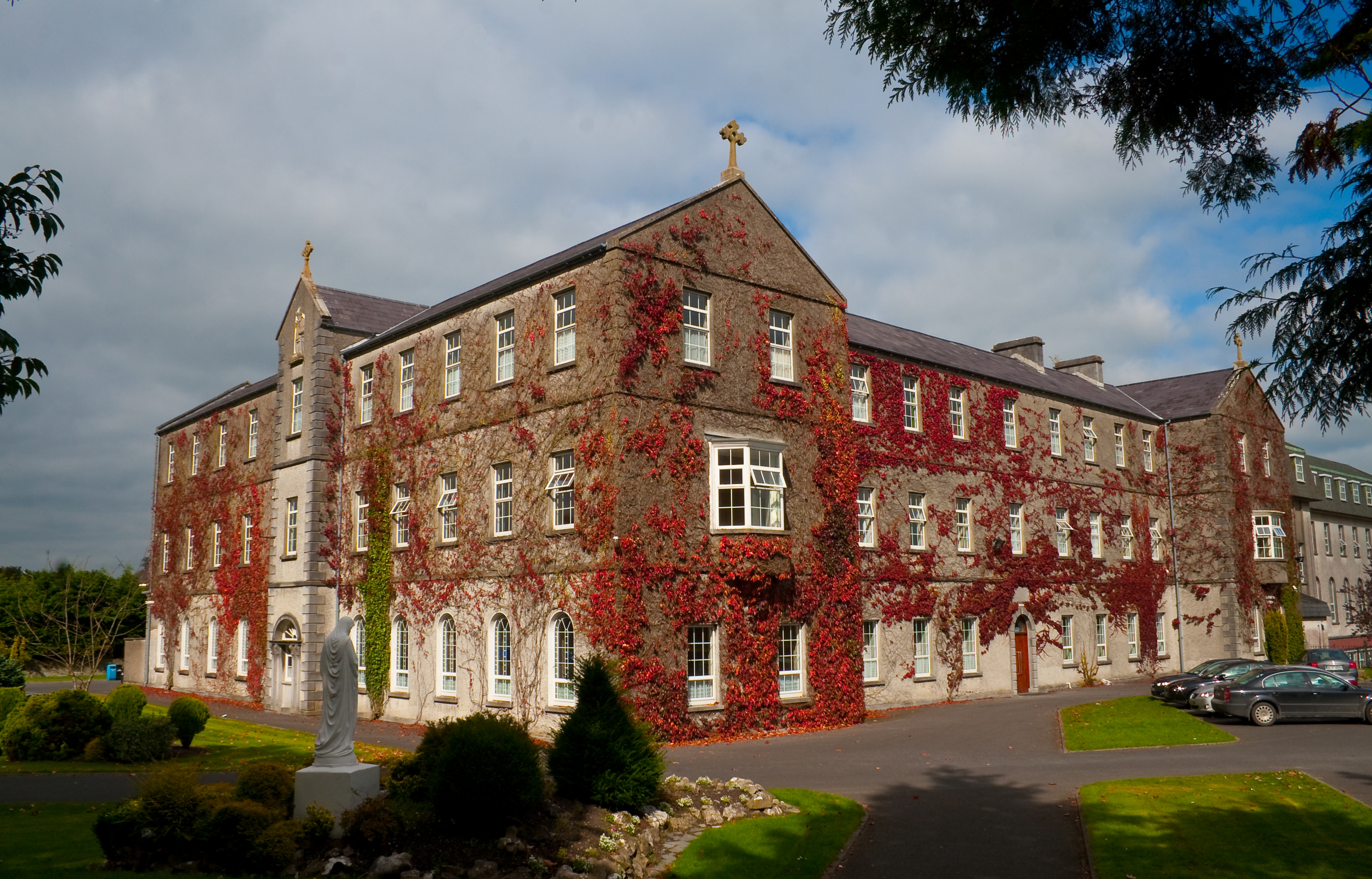
- St Jarlath's College, founded in 1800
- Tuam, County Galway

Information
- Type: Secondary school
- Motto: Veni lumen cordium
- Religious affiliation: Christianity (Catholic)
- Established: 1800; 226 years ago (Amalgamated 2009)
- President: John Kelly
- Faculty: 43
- Enrollment: 625
- Website: http://www.jarlaths.ie/

St Jarlath's College (Irish: Coláiste Iarfhlatha) is a Catholic co-educational secondary school in Tuam, County Galway. The college was founded in 1800 and in 2009 absorbed St. Patrick's College, Tuam. The College, which operates under patronage of the Archbishop of Tuam, is named after Jarlath, or Iarlaith, who founded a monastery in the town when, as legend has it, his chariot wheel broke. As of 2024, the enrolment was 625.

== History ==
Pre-amalgamation crest of St Jarlath's College, in use until 2009

=== Foundation ===
The original St Jarlath's College was founded in 1800 by the Archbishop of Tuam Edward Dillon, with the aim of preparing young boys for seminars formation at St Patrick's College, Maynooth. Dr Dillon had to seek permission to establish the college from the Protestant Archbishop of Tuam, Dr Beresford. It began with two thatched cottages at the Mall, Tuam later moving to a new building in Bishop Street, now commonly known as "the Old College".

Its first president was Rev Oliver Kelly, who later became Archbishop of Tuam. In 1824, the facilities of the College were enlarged by the erection of additional houses in Bishop Street and in 1856, the site of the present college and grounds was bought by Archbishop John McHale. This property was known as Keighrey's Park and a portion of it was used as the town's fair green. McHale continued to set it as a fair green to the town commissioners at a yearly rent of 30 until 1875 in which year the college was extensively enlarged by the addition of two wings to the first building which had been erected in 1858.

In 1851, Archbishop John McHale invited the Congregation of Christian Brothers to Tuam. The invitation resulted in the birth of Tuam CBS, and later St Patrick's College, a Catholic day secondary school, which was to play a not insignificant role in the education of young men from the lower orders in Tuam.

=== Amalgamation ===
St Jarlath's College (2008)

Plans to amalgamate St Patrick's And St Jarlath’s colleges had first been suggested in the late 1990s. At that time, a new school building had been promised by the Government. However, no such building materialised. The phasing out of boarding in St Jarlath's led to a reduced enrolment.

In March 2008, Archbishop Michael Neary (bishop), a trustee of both schools, announced to staff that the amalgamation would proceed in the absence of a new school building. The amalgamation process commenced in September 2008 with enrollment of all first year students in St Jarlath's. The process was completed in September 2009 when students from both schools amalgamated into the new school, in the old St Jarlath's building.

== Opera ==
Starting with The Mikado in 1944, the college's Amateur Operatic Society has performed a yearly musical or opera for the local community. The 1969 production, The Quaker Girl was the first to be held in conjunction with Mercy Convent, Tuam. The 2008 Opera was also in conjunction with St Patrick's College, due to the amalgamation process in progress at the time.

The tradition of the annual Opera was continued following the amalgamation, the 2009 Opera being the first production of the newly amalgamated school. The Opera has been successful in recent years in the Connacht Tribune organised musical awards, winning a Best Overall and a Best Chorus award in 2008 for Hot Mikado.

== Sport ==
The St Jarlath's College's senior football team hold the prestigious record of winning the Hogan Cup 12 times – the first time in 1947 - more than any other school, and have also been runners-up on a further 14 occasions. The college also holds the record for winning the most Connacht Colleges Senior Football Championships, with an outstanding 49 wins.

Since amalgamation, the school has won three Connacht Senior titles, reaching the Hogan Cup Final in 2011. Under the management of Joe Burke, and captained by Ian Burke from Corofin, the school narrowly lost out to St Colman's College, Newry by just one point.

== Sporting honours ==
- Connacht Colleges Senior Football Championship : 2022(*covid year))
- Paddy Buggy Cup (All-Ireland Colleges Senior 'B' Hurling Championship) : 1
- Connacht Colleges Senior Football Championship : 2 (2011, 2012, 2022)
- Hogan Cup Runners-Up : 1 (2011)

== Notable staff ==
- J. J. Cribbin — worked as Prefect of Studies
- Elaine Feeney — Irish writer
- Michael Meehan — the former Galway Gaelic footballer teaches mathematics

== Selected past pupils ==
- John Birmingham — well known amateur geologist and astronomer
- John Blowick — co-founder of the Missionary Society of St. Columban
- Thomas Carr — former archbishop of Melbourne, Australia
- Enda Colleran — former Gaelic footballer for, and later manager of, Galway
- Damien Comer — Gaelic footballer for Galway
- J. J. Cribbin — Gaelic footballer for Mayo, played for the school team
- Seán Óg De Paor — former Gaelic footballer for Galway
- Michael Donnellan — former Gaelic footballer for Galway
- Patrick Duggan — former bishop of Clonfert
- Peter Fallon — Columban priest kidnapped and killed by Japanese forces in 1945 in the Philippines
- Seán Flanagan — Fianna Fáil politician and Gaelic footballer
- John Heneghan — Columban priest kidnapped and killed by Japanese forces in 1945, in the Philippines, alongside Peter Fallon
- Jim Higgins — Member of the European Parliament for the North–West constituency of Ireland
- Monsignor James Horan — Parish Priest of Knock, responsible for the building of Ireland West Airport
- Colm Keaveney — TD, Labour Party and Fianna Fáil
- Thomas J. Kelly — Irish Nationalist and former leader of the Irish Republican Brotherhood
- Mark Killilea — politician, former Member of the European Parliament for the North–West Constituency
- Michael P. Kitt — former Teachta Dála (TD) for the Galway East constituency
- Tom Kitt — former Teachta Dála (TD) for the Dublin South constituency
- Patrick Lavelle - nicknamed Patriot Priest Of Partry
- Seamus Leydon — former Gaelic footballer for Galway
- Patrick Anthony Ludden — first bishop of Syracuse, New York
- Michael Lyster — former RTÉ presenter
- George McDermot — lawyer, scholar, Paulist priest
- Kevin McStay — former Gaelic footballer, played for the school team
- Michael Meehan — former Gaelic footballer for Galway
- Michael Neary — current archbishop of Tuam
- Patrick O’Boyle- Bishop of Killala, 1950-1970
- John O'Connor Power — M.P. for Mayo (1874–1885), Orator
- John O'Donohoe QC — Senator for Ontario, Canada (1882–1902)
- Seán Purcell — Gaelic footballer for County Galway
- John Sheehy — former British colonial official
- Tomás Tierney — former Gaelic footballer for Galway and Mayo

== Presidents ==
=== St. Jarlath's College ===
Name	From	To
Very Rev. Oliver Kelly (later Archbishop of Tuam)	1800	1806
Very Rev. Paul McGreal	1806	1817
Very Rev. James MacHale	1817	1821
Very Rev. Thomas Feeney	1821	1831
Very Rev. Martin Brown	1831	1837
Very Rev. James Ronan	1837	1838
Very Rev. William Cullinane	1838	1842
Very Rev. John Flanelly	1842	1845
Very Rev. Anthony Regan	1845	1849
Very Rev. Peter Reynolds	1849	1852
Very Rev. John McEvilly (later Archbishop of Tuam)	1852	1857
Very Rev. Patrick O’Brien	1857	1865
Very Rev. Ulick Bourke	1865	1878
Very Rev. Patrick Kilkenny	1878	1888
Very Rev. Michael O'Connell	1888	1893
Very Rev. John Fallon	1893	1898
Very Rev. Michael McHugh	1898	1903
Very Rev. Michael Higgins	1903	1910
Very Rev. Michael Conroy	1910	1915
Very Rev. Alex Eaton	1915	1923
Very Rev. Denis Ryder	1923	1928
Very Rev. Joseph Walsh (later Archbishop of Tuam)	1923	1940
Very Rev. Tim Gunnigan	1940	1947
Very Rev. Conor Heaney	1947	1961
Very Rev. Michael Mooney	1961	1971
Very Rev. Michael Walsh	1971	1977
Very Rev. Thomas Waldron	1977	1986
Very Rev. Dermot Maloney	1986	1994
Very Rev. Oliver Hughes	1994	2003
Very Rev. Conal Eustace	2003	2008

=== St Jarlath's College (post-amalgamation) ===
Name	From	To
Very Rev. Brendan Kilcoyne	2008	2013
Mr. John Kelly	2013	-
