= St Patrick's College, Maghera =

Coordinates: 54.845°N 6.673°W

St. Patrick's College, Maghera

Location
- 25 Coleraine Road; Maghera, County Londonderry, BT46 5BN; Northern Ireland

Information
- Motto: Fons Sapientiae Verbum Dei (Fountain of wisdom, The word of God)
- Established: 1963
- Head teacher: Katrina Crilly
- Gender: Mixed
- Enrollment: 1355
- Colours: Blue, Black, White,
- Website: stpatricksmaghera.org

St. Patrick's College, also known as St. Patrick's Co-Ed Comprehensive College, is a co-educational 11–18 secondary school in Maghera, County Londonderry, Northern Ireland. It teaches within the Roman Catholic ethos. The school is widely regarded as one of Ireland's most successful athletic schools, having won Six All-Ireland senior football titles, most recently in 2025.

== Catchment area ==
St Patrick's College, primarily serves those students who live within the Maghera parish - particularly those from the local feeder schools - but also those in the wider catchment area from towns including Randalstown, Dungiven and Glenullin

It consists of two sites, the main site for - those in Years 9 to 14 - and a separate site known as the "St Mary's Building" - for those in Year 8.

== Buildings of the Main Site ==
The main site consists of a number of buildings, including the "Two Storey" building, the "Three Storey" building, a block of mobiles, a music suite, a sports hall, an assembly hall and a canteen.

"Two Storey" building; The "Two Storey" building has two floors, containing rooms 1 through 20. Departments in this building include Maths, Geography, H.E. and History, as well as rooms set aside for students with Special Educational Needs (SEN). - The H.E. rooms are fitted with sinks, hobs and ovens. Access to kitchenware is provided but some fee is usually asked for to cover the cost of the ingredients in practicals. - The Assembly Hall is adjoined to the "Two Storey" and can be entered from within the "Two Storey". - Other facilities in this building include the offices of the Attendance officer and bursar. The office of the Principal is also in this building. The boardroom is in this building.

"Three Storey" building; The "Three Storey" building has three floors, containing rooms 21 through to 60. Departments in this building include Technology + Design, Art, Sciences (Chemistry, Biology, Physics), Languages (Irish, French, Spanish), English and I.T. - The Technology + Design rooms vary by use. Theory rooms will often have computers, for access to programs such as AutoCAD. Practical rooms will have access to tools and machinery under teacher supervision. - Those in the Art rooms have access to art supplies, including brushes, paints, pastels, etc. There was formerly a kiln, prior to the fire in the Art Department in 2023. - Science rooms vary slightly by use. All rooms have access to gas taps and water taps, as well as a litany of practical supplies (such as glassware). The variation is primarily in the adjacent classroom stores - Biology rooms will house microscopes whereas Chemistry rooms are more likely to house chemicals. These are only used under teacher supervision. - I.T. rooms all have access to Dell computers, running Windows 10. Students are provided with their own account and log-in details. There are no fees for the use of these computers. - The "Three Storey" also houses two sixth form centres, one for Year 13s, and one for Year 14s. Both centres have computer and printer access. - Additional facilities include an overflow centre in case of staff absence/sixth form overflow, a resources centre for staff use, a staff room and the offices of the I.T. technicians, Exams Officer, Senior Staff and the V.P.

Music Suite; The music suite consists of two classrooms, a two recording studios and two practice rooms. Both classrooms have access to a central store room, where most instruments are kept. The recording studios are often used by GCSE and A-Level students to record compositions. Practice rooms are for use by both students seeking a separate room to work on their pieces, and by external NEELB instrument tutors.

Mobile Blocks; There are 4 mobiles, all surrounding the music suite. The mobiles have been recently refurbished, and their use is primarily by the R.E. department.

Sports hall; The sports hall is a large hall, complete with netting to separate three separate courts. Basketball hoops are fixed to the walls. A storeroom contains various materials for all other sporting activities offered by the P.E. department. There is an adjoining gym, and gendered changing rooms.

== Buildings of the St. Mary's Building ==
The St. Mary's Building consists of the main building, two mobiles, a Technology + Design building, a front grass pitch, two all-weather courts (separated by gender), two gendered changing rooms and a canteen. There is also an office for the Head of Year.

The main building is over 3 levels, all of which are joined by sets of steps. There are accessible alternatives to these small sets of steps. 6 buildings on site have set purpose - an Art room, H.E. room. Science room, Two Technology + Design rooms (one theory, one practical) and an I.T. room. All other rooms are general purpose, as in Year 8, classes are consistently occupied by one form class, with teachers moving to those classes between subjects.

The mobiles act as the Year 8 music suite. There is access to instruments, including the glockenspiel. These are notably less advanced than those available to those in the Main Site.

The Technology + Design block consists of the two Technology + Design rooms - one theory and one practical - as well as a computer room for the I.T. department.

== Subjects ==
Pupils enrolled in years 8–10 will take 15 mandatory subjects: English, maths, junior science (a compound subject including biology, chemistry and physics), religious studies, art, home economics, information technology, technology (and design), history, geography, Irish, and a choice between French or Spanish. Pupils also attend non-exam classes such as physical education, citizenship, and employability.

In Years 11 and 12, pupils will sit their GCSE examinations, with compulsory classes of: English language, maths, a choice between single, double or triple award science, and religious studies. Dependant on what level of science is studied, pupils may select an additional 4, 3 or 2 GCSEs, respectively. These choices are made from the CCEA specification, although a few subjects - such as German - are not offered. These choices are made in Mid-to-Late Year 10. Most pupils in the school will sit English literature examinations alongside English language, but only two classes per year (approx 60 pupils) will sit further mathematics examinations in their Year 12 alongside standard mathematics in their Year 11. These year groups also sit non-exam classes such as physical education, citizenship and employability. Some pupils may not be offered English language, maths or dDouble/triple science, and will opt for essential skills English, essential skills maths and single award science, or a mixture of the three.

At A Level, students select 3 A Levels (although some are offered 4, with one taken to only AS level), again from CCEA specifications. Some of these classes require travel to other schools, such as French. Students in Year 13 will sit their AS level examinations, and students in Year 14 will sit their A Level examinations. A Level choices are made in Mid-to-Late Year 12.

All GCSE and A Level classes are subject to enrolment numbers.

== Results ==
According to the ETI assessment of the school in 2015, the academic performance was rated as either "very good" or "outstanding". It noted that "the percentage of pupils progressing to higher education courses is well above the NI average for non-selective schools".

In the academic year 2016/2017, 85.9% of its entrants received five or more GCSEs at grades A* to C, including the core subjects English and Maths.

== Sports ==
The school has a large tradition in sports—particularly Gaelic sports—and is one of the most successful schools in Northern Ireland in this field. The college have been crowned All-Ireland Champions on 6 occasions, winning the Hogan Cup, most recently in 2025. Additionally, the college currently holds 17 Ulster - MacRory Cup titles as well as 17 Mageean Cups. They are also very successful in junior sports, such as Rannafast titles. Notably, the Senior Camogie team also reached the All-Ireland Senior Camogie Semi-Finals in 2020. More recently the senior Camogie team reached the finals in 2022-2023 for the all Irelands.

== Extracurriculars ==
St. Patrick's College has two choirs, a Junior Choir for those in those years 8–10, and a Senior Choir for those years 11–14. The choirs tend to jointly perform at school events such as the Christmas Carol Service or the school's Easter mass, but in recent years the Senior Choir has participated in competitions such as BBC School Choir of the Year (2020)

St. Patrick's presents opportunities for pupils to use their voice through the roles of Junior and Senior Head Boy and Head Girl, as well as their deputies. Prefects can also be elected to both leadership teams. Junior Leadership runs throughout Year 10, and Senior Leadership through year 14. Opportunities are presented for those in Years 8–14 to be elected to the School Council, with roles such as chair and vice-chair.

St Patrick's has a debate team, which participates yearly in Concern Debates, an All-Ireland debate tournament organised by charity group Concern. Years 11–14 can participate in the debates, which are organised between other schools. Recently, the team reached the knockout rounds.

The school runs School Aid Romania, in which a selection of students from year 13 travel to regions of Romania to provide aid work to the locals, bringing donations of cash and toys for children.

== Notable alumni ==
- Cathal Ó hOisín (born 1963) – Sinn Féin politician
- Johnny McGurk (born 1965) – Gaelic footballer
- Dermot McNicholl (born 1965) – Gaelic footballer
- Henry Downey (born 1966) – Former Derry Hurler and Gaelic Footballer. Henry played at centre half when Derry won their only All-Ireland Senior Gaelic Football title in 1993, Henry was the captain of this team
- Anthony Tohill (born 1971) – Former Australian Rules Footballer and Gaelic Footballer. Anthony played at midfield when Derry won their only All-Ireland Senior Gaelic Football title in 1993
- Seán Marty Lockhart (born 1976) – Gaelic footballer
- Conor Glass (born 1997) – Former Australian Rules Footballer, Current Gaelic Footballer
- Brooke Scullion (born 1999) - singer, represented Ireland at Eurovision 2022 with her song "That's Rich"
