= Good Counsel College, New Ross =

School in County Wexford, Ireland

Good Counsel College
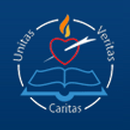

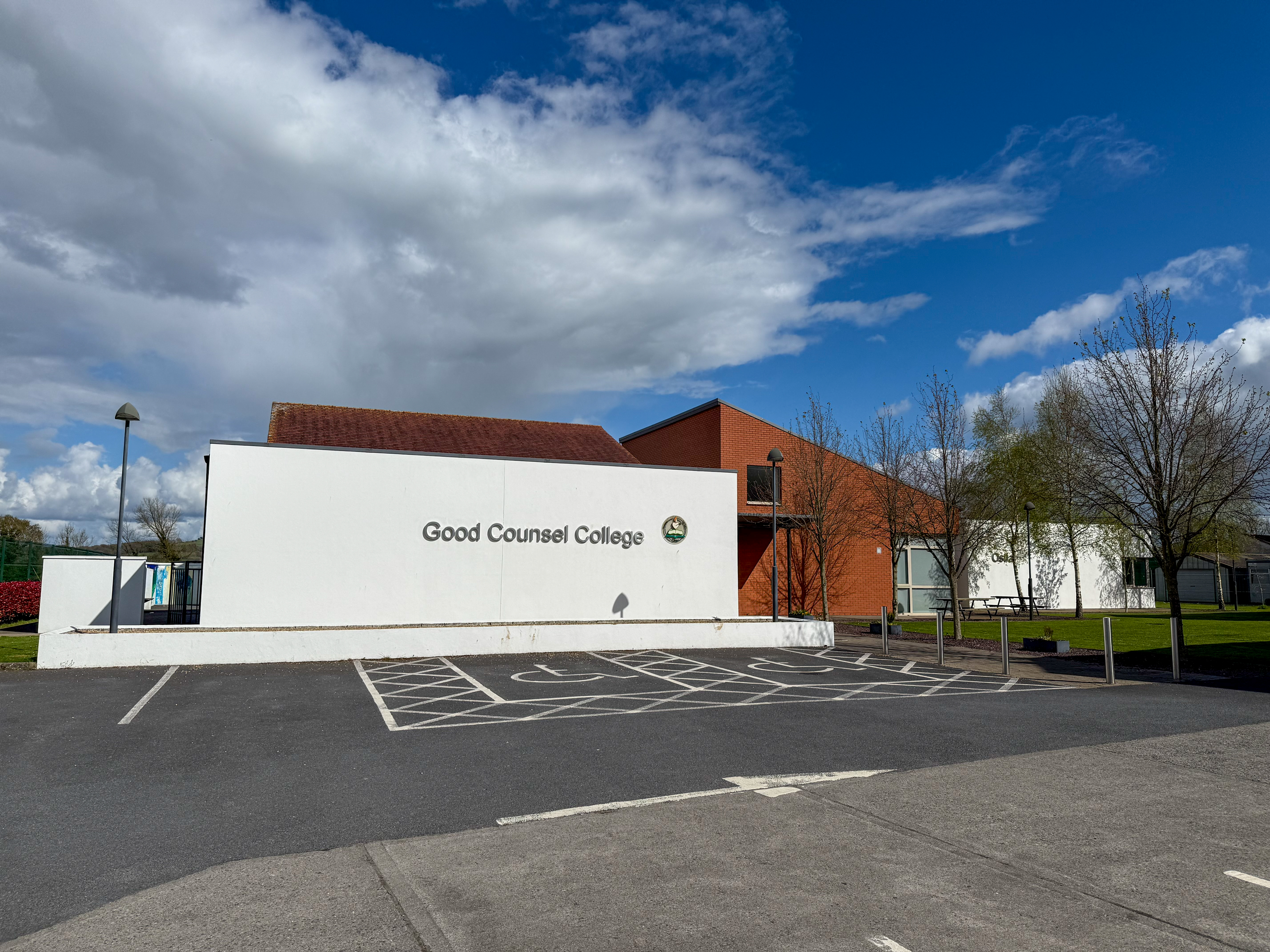
- Good Counsel College in 2026

Location
- New Ross, County Wexford; Ireland; 52.3957°N 6.9314°W

Information
- Type: Secondary school
- Motto: In Omnibus Caritas (In all things love)
- Established: 1890
- President: Rev. Fr. Michael Collender O.S.A.
- Principal: Mark O'Brien
- Chaplain: Helen Bolger; Michael Collender
- Teaching staff: approx. 60
- Gender: Male
- Enrollment: approx. 760 (2026)
- Campus: Urban
- Colours: Blue, White
- Affiliations: Roman Catholic Church
- Website: www.goodcounselcollege.ie

Good Counsel College (Irish: Coláiste na Dea Comhairle), also known as St Augustine's and Our Lady of Good Counsel College, is an all-boys secondary school in New Ross, County Wexford, Ireland. It was founded and is overseen by the Order of Saint Augustine in Ireland. It is one of two secondary schools in Ireland under the trusteeship of the Augustinian Order, with the other being in St Augustine's College, Dungarvan, County Waterford. Good Counsel College is the largest school in New Ross. As of 2026, school had an enrollment of over 760 and the principal was Mark O'Brien.

== Patron saint ==
The college is named in honour of the 4th-century saint Augustine of Hippo, a philosopher and theologian whose writings were influential in the doctrinal development of Western Christianity.

Good Counsel College is one of two schools in Ireland under the trusteeship of the Irish province of the Augustinian Order and the Augustinian School Trust.

Other Augustinian schools in Ireland include St Augustine's College, Dungarvan. English-speaking Augustinian schools elsewhere in the world, with the same patron, include one in Richland, New Jersey and in San Diego, California (both in the United States), Colegio San Agustin-Bacolod, Colegio San Agustin, Biñan and Colegio San Agustin, Makati in the Philippines, as well as a school in Malta and one in Sydney, Australia.

== History ==
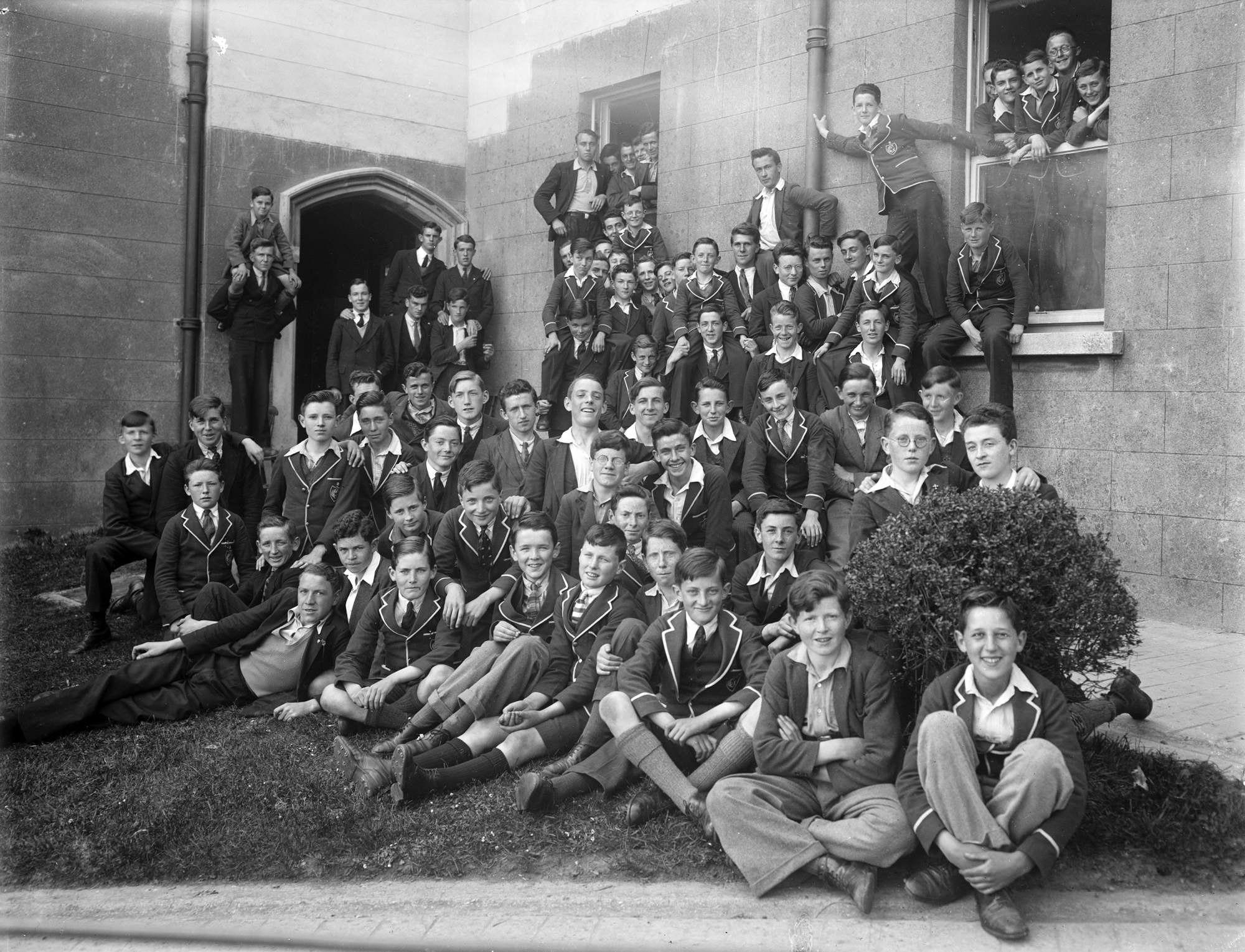
Group of pupils and teachers in Good Counsel College, New Ross in the 1930s

Since it was established in its present form in 1256, the Augustinian Order throughout the world has viewed involvement in education as an important part of its apostolate. Beginning in the 1790s, the Augustinians made various attempts to establish colleges in New Ross, but due to adverse political and economic circumstances their efforts met with a limited degree of success until 1890, when Good Counsel College was established.

Good Counsel College was founded by Fr John Furlong and opened, initially with 40 day pupils, in September 1890. From 1890 until 1980, the old Good Counsel College stood in the centre of New Ross. It operated as a relatively small boarding school and catered for students from all parts of Ireland.

During the 1960s, student numbers increased greatly, the majority of them being local day-students. A greatly expanded curriculum placed increasing demands on the existing facilities. Accordingly, a new college was constructed on the outskirts of the town and opened its doors as the new "Counsel" in 1984.

Since then, the college has grown further with the addition of a technology block (Villanova), a new classroom block (Cascia), and a sports hall with gymnasium named after the past rector of the college, Fr. John Cosgrave, O.S.A.. Four floodlit astro turf pitches were also subsequently added.

As of the early 21st century, Good Counsel College "continues to provide an education in the Augustinian tradition". As of 2026, the school had an enrollment of 763 and the principal was Mark O'Brien. O'Brien assumed the post in 2013, after the principal Fr. John Hennebry O.S.A. took the position of Provincial of the Order of Saint Augustine.

== Facilities ==
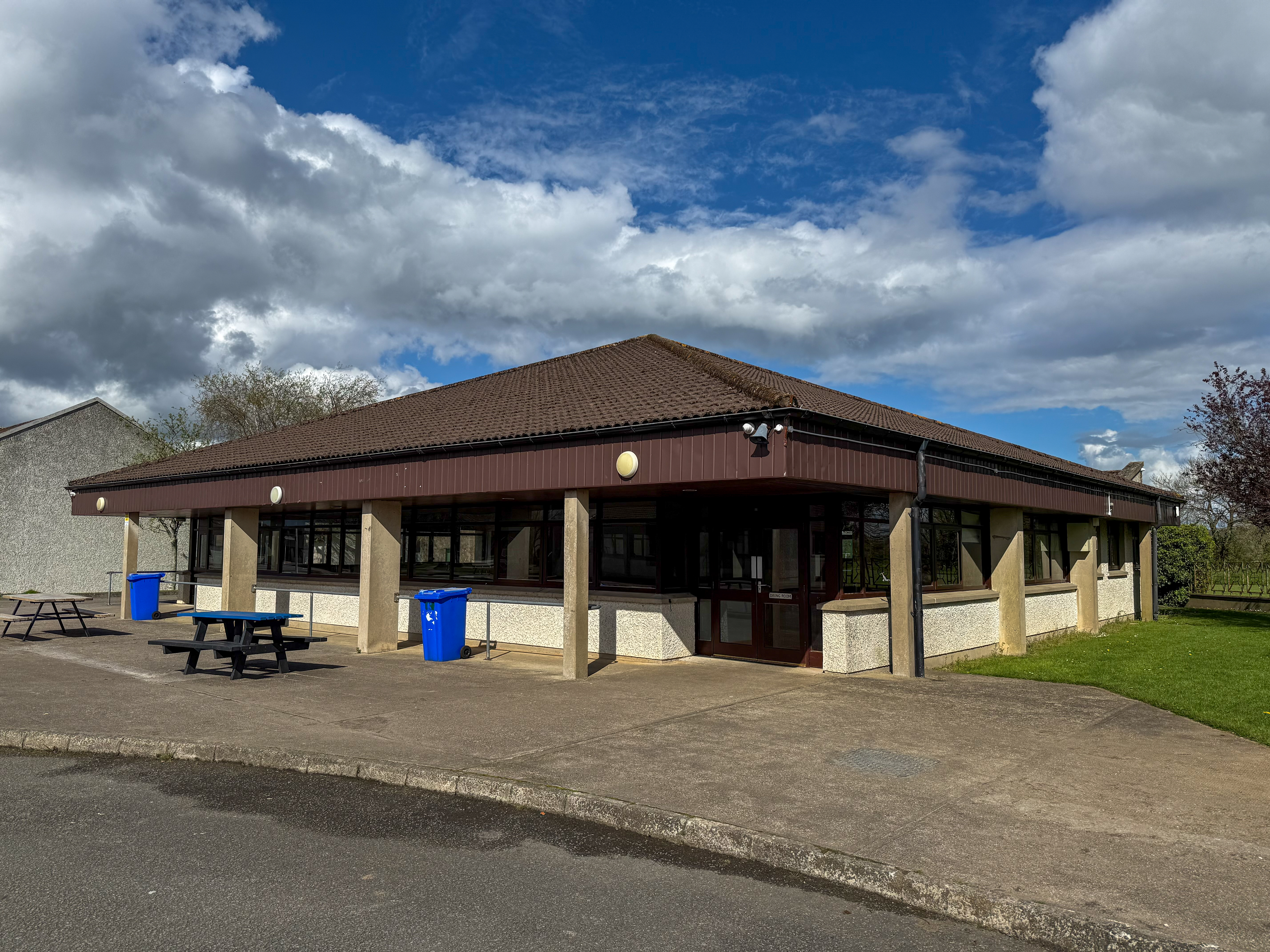
Canteen facility

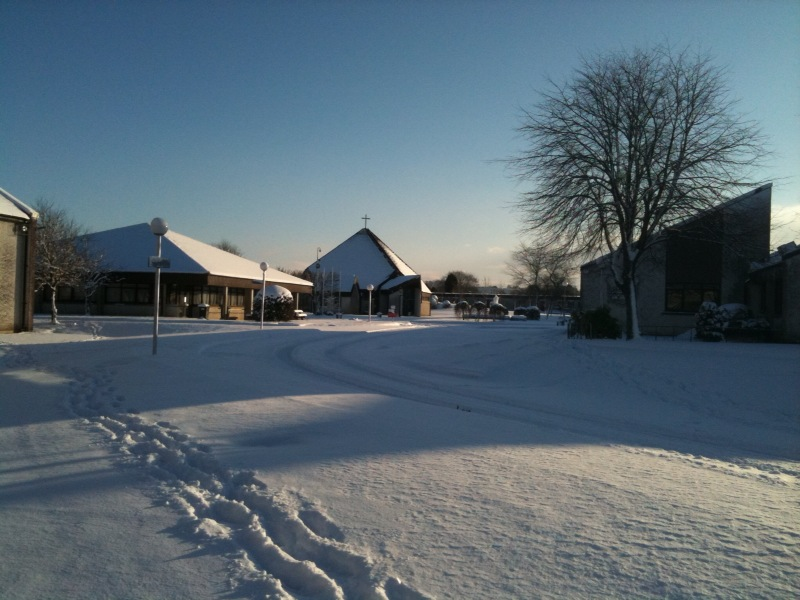
The campus, including the refectory/church, under snow

Facilities include a refectory, assembly hall, sports centre including an indoor sports hall and gymnasium, learning support centre, technology block, first year block and various playing fields including three GAA pitches, two rugby pitches, a soccer pitch and four astroturf pitches. There are two basketball/tennis courts behind the sports hall.

The APEX Gym & Swimming Pool is located on the grounds of Good Counsel College.

== Sport ==
In 1999, the school secured the Senior Colleges A Football Championship and won the Hogan Cup, the premier trophy for post-primary schools in Gaelic football.

== Former students ==
Notable former students include:

- Ger Aylward, hurler
- Ben Brosnan, Wexford football captain and businessman
- Pádraic Delaney, actor
- Dermot Desmond, businessman and financier
- Kevin Doyle, former professional footballer
- Tadhg Furlong, Ireland and Leinster rugby player
- Aidan O'Brien, racehorse trainer
- Matthew O'Hanlon, Wexford hurling captain
- John Paul Phelan, Fine Gael TD
- Maverick Sabre, recording artist
- Walter Walsh, Kilkenny hurler
