= CBS Roscommon =

Catholic public school for boys in Ireland

CBS Roscommon (Irish: Meánscoil na mBráithre Críostí) is a Catholic public secondary school for boys, located in Roscommon town, County Roscommon, Ireland.

The school is located in Roscommon on the road to Galway on the edge of Roscommon town. It was founded by the Congregation of the Christian Brothers in 1935. It accommodates approximately 350 students. The Brothers also had a Boys National School from classes 2nd to 6th (boys had their first three years of education in the Convent of Mercy).

== Academics ==
The curriculum offered is broad, covering all common subjects in the State Examinations including Spanish, French, Art, Materials Technology, Graphics, Chemistry, Physics, Biology, Agricultural Science and Economics.

== Extra-curricular activities ==
The principal sports in the school are hurling and Gaelic football. Swimming, soccer, handball, basketball, tennis, golf, athletics and rugby are also played by the seniors. The school won All Ireland Schools B in 2011, 2019 and again in 2025. They appeared in the Hogan Cup final (All-Ireland Schools A) in 2015 also winning the Connacht A senior title, beating Summerhill College Sligo. In 2016, the senior hurlers won the Connacht C Hurling Championship final and went on to contest the All-Ireland title losing out to Scoil Mhuire Gan Smal of Blarney by 1 point.

== Alumni ==
- Liam Gilmartin (1921–2019) – Gaelic footballer
- Brian McDonald (born 1941) – Gaelic footballer
- Dr Colm "Burger" O'Reilly - Not a real doctor
