= Leinster Colleges Senior Football Championship =

Gaelic football competition

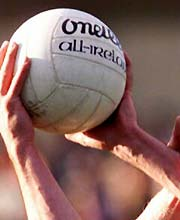

The Leinster colleges senior football "A" championship, is the top level Gaelic football competition for secondary schools in Leinster. The winners receive the Brother Bosco (Mulhare) Cup and advance to the All-Ireland colleges "A" senior football championship, where they compete for the Hogan Cup.

St Mel's College of Longford hold the record for number of wins and this includes a record of six title wins in a row and a total of eight in the same decade. They also reached fourteen straight finals between 1930 and 1943. Coláiste Mhuire, Mullingar are the current title holders.

== Wins listed by college ==
#	Team	Titles	Years won
1	St Mel's College, Longford	29	1928, 1933, 1934, 1935, 1936, 1937, 1938, 1940, 1941, 1942, 1943, 1945, 1946, 1947, 1948, 1951, 1961, 1962, 1963, 1964, 1969, 1971, 1982, 1987, 1988, 1989, 1990, 1994, 2003
2	St Patrick's, Navan	10	1991, 1993, 1997, 2000, 2001, 2004, 2006, 2007, 2010, 2013
2	St Finian's College, Mullingar	10	1925, 1926, 1927, 1939, 1944, 1949, 1950, 1953, 1960, 1966
4	Carmelite College, Moate	6	1975, 1976, 1977, 1978, 1980, 1981
5	Knockbeg College, Carlow	5	1920, 1932, 1954, 1955, 2005
5	Franciscan College, Gormanston	5	1958, 1970, 1972, 1973, 1974
5	Naas C.B.S.	5	2018, 2019, 2022, 2023, 2024
8	Belcamp College OMI, Dublin	4	1921, 1965, 1967, 1968
8	Good Counsel, New Ross	4	1995, 1996, 1999, 2015
10	Coláiste Mhuire, Mullingar	3	1983, 2025, 2026
10	Coláiste Caoimhin, Dublin	3	1929, 1930, 1931
11	St Joseph's, Fairview	2	1956, 1959
11	Coláiste Eoin, Dublin	2	1998, 2014
11	Dundalk Colleges	2	2002, 2011
11	St Mary's Secondary School, Edenderry	2	2009, 2012
11	St Peter's, Wexford	2	1992, 2017
16	St Kieran's, Kilkenny	1	1922
16	St Thomas's, Newbridge	1	1923
16	Cistercian College, Roscrea	1	1924
16	Franciscan College, Multyfarnham	1	1952
16	Patrician College, Ballyfin	1	1957
16	Ardscoil Rís, Dublin	1	1979
16	Portarlington CBS	1	1984
16	Dundalk CBS	1	1985
16	St David's, Artane	1	1986
16	Athlone CC	1	2008
16	St Benildus College, Dublin	1	2016
16	St Joseph's SS, Rochfortbridge	1	2020

== Finals listed by year ==
Year	Winner	Score	Opponent	Score
2026	**Coláiste Mhuire, Mullingar**	3-16	Marist College, Athlone	2-13
2025	Coláiste Mhuire, Mullingar	3-10	Ardscoil na Tríonóide	1-13
2024	Naas CBS	1-12	Coláiste Choilm, Tullamore	0-10
2023	Naas CBS	0-11	Moate CS	0-09
2022	**Naas CBS**	0-14	Maynooth EC	2-07
2021	Cancelled due to the COVID-19 pandemic			
2020	St Joseph's SS, Rochfortbridge	2-13	Naas CBS	0-15
2019	Naas CBS	2-12	Wicklow Schools	1-09
2018	Naas CBS	0-09	Marist College, Athlone	0-07
2017	St Peter's, Wexford	2-13	Moate CS	0-07
2016	St Benildus College, Dublin	2-07	Marist College, Athlone	1-06
2015	Good Counsel, New Ross	0-13	St Mary's Secondary School, Edenderry	0-11
2014	Coláiste Eoin, Dublin	1-10	Marist College, Athlone	1-08
2013	St Patrick's, Navan	1-12	St Mary's Secondary School, Edenderry	2-07
2012	**St Mary's Secondary School, Edenderry**	1-14	Coláiste Eoin, Dublin	2-10
2011	Dundalk Colleges	2-08	St Patrick's, Navan	0-12
2010	St Patrick's, Navan	1-12	Coláiste Eoin, Dublin	2-08
2009	St Mary's Secondary School, Edenderry	1-05	Good Counsel, New Ross	1-04
2008	Athlone CC	0-10	Franciscan College, Gormanston	0-09
2007	St Patrick's, Navan	2-09	Knockbeg College, Carlow	0-13
2006	St Patrick's, Navan		Good Counsel, New Ross	
2005	**Knockbeg College, Carlow**	0-11	St Mel's College, Longford	1-07
2004	**St Patrick's, Navan**		Knockbeg College, Carlow	
2003	St Mel's College, Longford		St Patrick's, Navan	
2002	Dundalk Colleges		St Patrick's, Navan	
2001	**St Patrick's, Navan**		St Mel's College, Longford	
2000	**St Patrick's, Navan**		St Mel's College, Longford	
1999	**Good Counsel, New Ross**	1-07	Marist College, Athlone	0-08
1998	Coláiste Eoin, Dublin	2-20	St Patrick's, Navan	4-13
1997	St Patrick's, Navan	0-15	St Mel's College, Longford	1-10
1996	Good Counsel, New Ross	2-10	St Peter's, Wexford	1-06
1995	Good Counsel, New Ross	1-11	St Peter's, Wexford	1-06
1994	St Mel's College, Longford	3-11	St Peter's, Wexford	1-05
1993	St Patrick's, Navan	2-10	St Michael's, Trim	1-07
1992	St Peter's, Wexford	1-09	Portarlington CBS	1-08
1991	St Patrick's, Navan	2-10	Moyne Community School	1-08
1990	St Mel's College, Longford	4-08	St Joseph's, Fairview	2-05
1989	St Mel's College, Longford	1-16	Moyle Park, Clondalkin	0-03
1988	St Mel's College, Longford	2-08	St Mary's, Mullingar	1-04
1987	**St Mel's College, Longford**	2-13	St Mary's, Mullingar	1-04
1986	St David's, Artane	0-07	St Peter's, Wexford	0-04
1985	Dundalk CBS	1-11	St Mary's CBS, Portlaoise	0-07
1984	Portarlington CBS	0-12	St David's, Artane	1-04
1983	St Mary's, Mullingar	1-05	Marist College, Athlone	0-05
1982	St Mel's College, Longford	1-12	Moyle Park, Clondalkin	1-09
1981	**Carmelite College, Moate**	1-06	St Mary's, Mullingar	0-05
1980	**Carmelite College, Moate**	1-05	Franciscan College, Gormanston	1-02
1979	**Ardscoil Rís, Dublin**	2-08	St Mel's College, Longford	0-04
1978	Carmelite College, Moate	1-09	St Mel's College, Longford	0-10
1977	Carmelite College, Moate	2-16	St Mel's College, Longford	0-07
1976	**Carmelite College, Moate**	3-10	St Joseph's, Fairview	1-07
1975	Carmelite College, Moate	1-12	Franciscan College, Gormanston	1-05
1974	Franciscan College, Gormanston	2-13	Knockbeg College, Carlow	1-05
1973	**Franciscan College, Gormanston**	2-11	St Mel's College, Longford	1-07
1972	Franciscan College, Gormanston	2-12	Patrician College, Ballyfin	2-10
1971	St Mel's College, Longford	1-07	Franciscan College, Gormanston	1-04
1970	Franciscan College, Gormanston	3-09	St Finian's College, Mullingar	0-08
1969	St Mel's College, Longford	1-20	Belcamp OMI, Dublin	1-03
1968	Belcamp OMI, Dublin	3-04	St Mel's College, Longford	0-09
1967	Belcamp OMI, Dublin	3-07	St Finian's College, Mullingar	1-05
1966	St Finian's College, Mullingar	4-03	Franciscan College, Gormanston	0-04
1965	Belcamp OMI, Dublin	3-11	St Finian's College, Mullingar	1-04
1964	St Mel's College, Longford	4-06	O'Connell School, Dublin	1-05
1963	**St Mel's College, Longford**	2-06	O'Connell School, Dublin	2-03
1962	**St Mel's College, Longford**	4-11	Franciscan College, Gormanston	0-01
1961	St Mel's College, Longford	3-09	St Finian's College, Mullingar	1-03
1960	St Finian's College, Mullingar	3-09	St Mel's College, Longford	0-05
1959	**St Joseph's, Fairview**	9-09	Franciscan College, Gormanston	1-07
1958	Franciscan College, Gormanston	2-08	Patrician College, Ballyfin	0-06
1957	Patrician College, Ballyfin	4-08	St Joseph's, Fairview	3-05
1956	St Joseph's, Fairview	1-08	St Mel's College, Longford	2-03
1955	Knockbeg College, Carlow	1-08	Synge Street CBS, Dublin	1-04
1954	Knockbeg College, Carlow	3-08	O'Connell School, Dublin	1-05
1953	St Finian's College, Mullingar	6-12	St Peter's, Wexford	0-04
1952	Franciscan College, Multyfarnham	1-08	St Mel's College, Longford	0-07
1951	St Mel's College, Longford	1-08	St. Peter's College, Wexford	0-03
1950	St Finian's College, Mullingar	1-04 w/o	St Mel's College, Longford	0-07
1949	St Finian's College, Mullingar	2-12	Knockbeg College, Carlow	1-09
1948	**St Mel's College, Longford**	w/o	O'Connell School, Dublin	
1947	St Mel's College, Longford	5-08	St Finian's College, Mullingar	3-10
1946	St Mel's College, Longford	5-06	St Finian's College, Mullingar	2-10
1945	St Mel's College, Longford	1-10	O'Connell School, Dublin	0-05
1944	St Finian's College, Mullingar	5-03	Westland Row CBS, Dublin	2-01
1943	St Mel's College, Longford	2-08	St Joseph's, Marino	3-03
1942	St Mel's College, Longford	1-03	O'Connell School, Dublin	1-01
1941	St Mel's College, Longford	1-08	O'Connell School, Dublin	1-01
1940	St Mel's College, Longford	3-04	St Finian's College, Mullingar	1-01
1939	St Finian's College, Mullingar	5-03	St Mel's College, Longford	2-05
1938	St Mel's College, Longford	3-07	St. Vincent's C.B.S., Glasnevin	1-06
1937	St Mel's College, Longford	4-01	Knockbeg College, Carlow	1-03
1936	St Mel's College, Longford	2-04	Westland Row CBS, Dublin	2-01
1935	St Mel's College, Longford	3-05	St Finian's College, Mullingar	0-04
1934	St Mel's College, Longford	2-02	Knockbeg College, Carlow	1-02
1933	St Mel's College, Longford	1-03	Coláiste Caoimhin, Dublin	0-03
1932	Knockbeg College, Carlow	5-05	St Mel's College, Longford	4-03
1931	Coláiste Caoimhin, Dublin	2-01	St Mel's College, Longford	0-02
1930	Coláiste Caoimhin, Dublin	2-05	St Mel's College, Longford	2-00
1929	Coláiste Caoimhin, Dublin	5-07	Patrician College, Ballyfin	0-03
1928	St Mel's College, Longford	2-01	Belcamp, Dublin	0-00
1927	St Finian's College, Mullingar	2-15	St. Enda's, Dublin	0-01
1926	St Finian's College, Mullingar	2-08	Knockbeg College, Carlow	1-05
1925	St Finian's College, Mullingar	0-04	Cistercian College, Roscrea	0-02
1924	Cistercian College, Roscrea	1-02	Knockbeg College, Carlow	0-03
1923	St Thomas's, Newbridge	3-03	St Finian's College, Mullingar	2-01
1922	St Kieran's, Kilkenny	1-05	St Thomas's, Newbridge	1-04
1921	Belcamp OMI, Dublin	1-01	Cistercian College, Roscrea	0-02
1920	Knockbeg College, Carlow	1-06	Terenure College, Dublin	1-02

- Teams in **bold** went on to win the **Hogan Cup** in the same year.

== See also ==
- Hogan Cup
- Connacht Championship
- Corn Uí Mhuirí (Munster Championship)
- MacRory Cup (Ulster Championship)
- Hurling Championship

== Sources ==
- "Leinster Colleges Senior Football Championships". Leinster GAA. 3 May 2007. Archived from the original on 26 February 2011.
