= Coláiste Mhuire, Mullingar =

School in Mullingar, Ireland

St Mary's CBS
- Coláiste Mhuire
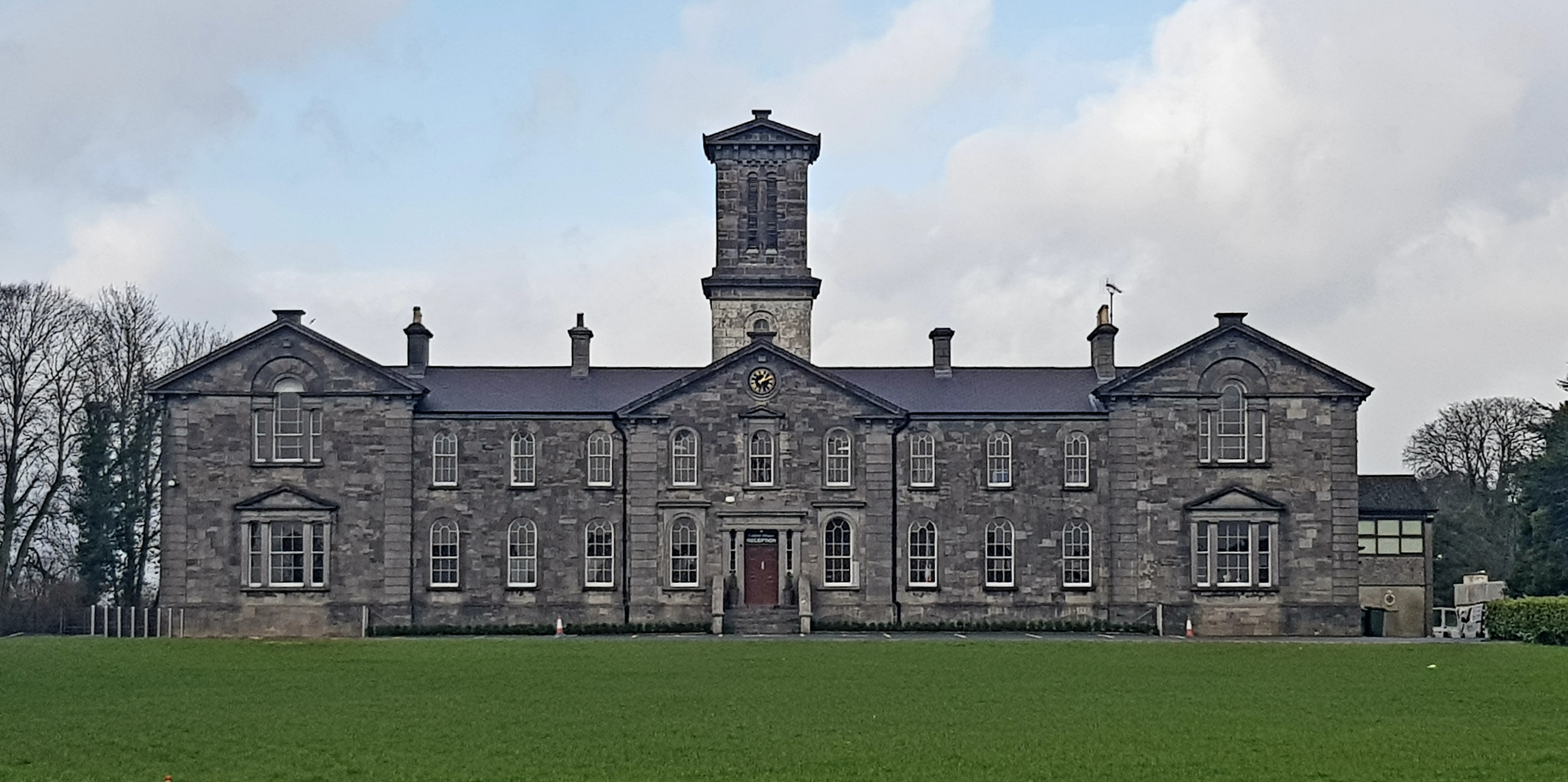
- The main façade of the Hevey Institute, 2018

Location
- College Street; Mullingar; N91 AT04; Ireland
- Coordinates: 53°31′38.125″N 7°20′48.815″W

Information
- School type: Voluntary secondary school
- Religious affiliation: Roman Catholic
- Opened: 20 October 1856; 169 years ago
- Founder: James Hevey Trust
- Principal: Keith Quinn
- Deputy Principal(s): Niall O'Brien & Micheal Lawler
- Staff: 65 (2025)
- Teaching staff: 65 (2025)
- Gender: Male
- Age range: 12–19
- Enrollment: 875 (2025)
- Colour
- Nickname: CBS
- Team name: St Mary's CBS
- Roll number: 63270K
- Website: cbsmullingar.ie
- Last updated: June 10, 2025

Coláiste Mhuire is a voluntary secondary school in Mullingar, County Westmeath, Ireland. The school officially opened its doors to students on 20 October 1856 and is the oldest post primary school in the town. It is based partly in the Hevey Institute and elsewhere in extensions which were built in the 1970s, 2005 & 2021. A further new development is planned for 2026/2027. The school is a member of the Edmund Rice Schools Trust which is a network of Catholic secondary schools in Ireland, and is located adjacent to St Mary's Primary School and the Cathedral of Christ the King.

== History and recent years ==
The foundation of the school in the town was largely due to the philanthropy of a local retired brewer and landowner, James Hevey. A site for the school was obtained from Lord Granard at an annual rent of £15. Within 20 years, during which time the area was devastated by the Great Famine in the 1840s and as a result delayed the opening of the school. Hevey's last will and testament of 1835, which had been looked over by Daniel O'Connell, contained the following bequest: “all my right and interest in the town and in the lands of Bryanstown for the support, maintenance, and education of poor children of the parish of Mullingar”. In 1837, the Hevey Trust was set up to ensure that the benefactor's purpose was fulfilled. The Hevey Institute was built to the designs of James Bourke, who died in 1871. On 23 September 1959, a Saint Mary's Primary School was opened on the grounds. A few years later, in 1972, a secondary school extension containing modernised classrooms was built at a cost of IE£124,060 (€1.75 million in today's money) which was extended in 2003 at a cost of €3 million that included a state of the art technology room which opened in February 2005. On 16 November 2012, the official opening of the restored Hevey Institute was held by members of the Hevey Trust. Joseph O'Meara, a former mathematics teacher in the school, served as principal from 1994 to 2015. In 2020, the school had an extension consisting of Construction studies, home economics and two classrooms.

The school's admission policy states that it accepts students of non-Catholic faiths, however it does not state anything in relation to those who have no faith.

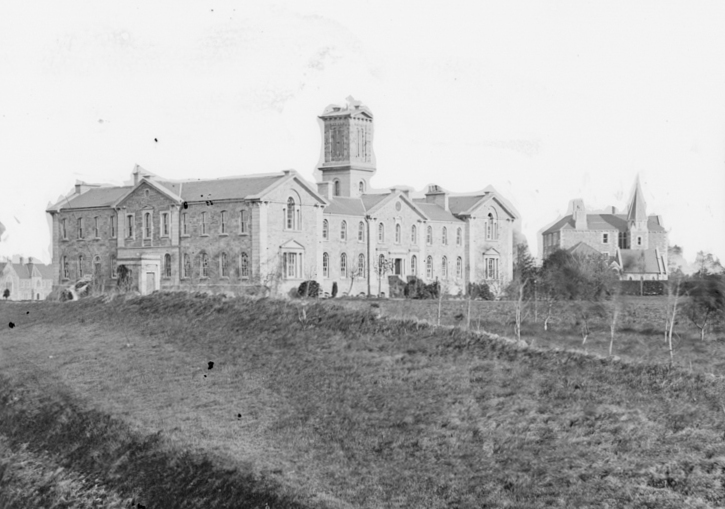
The school, c.1860-1883

=== School committees ===
The parent's council is a committee set up by the parents of students in the school and other volunteers. The council debates on issues relevant to the ongoing development of the school, and on issues affecting students and school life. The student's council is a committee set up by students in the school. An election takes place each year, around the end of April for the next year's candidates. The student's council asks students on changes that they'd like to see changed to the school such as variations of food offered by the canteen and outdoor seating.

== Extracurricular activities ==
Gaelic games are the most prevalent sports played in the school with success in all codes, including hurling, Gaelic football and handball. Other clubs and societies include badminton, golf, music, basketball and drama.

== Enrolment ==
The school is a boys only school since it was established in the 19th century. Transition Year is offered in the school, and is an optional choice with a set fee for the year.

== Notable alumni ==
- James Geoghegan (1886–1951) - Fianna Fáil politician, barrister and judge
- John Joe Nevin (b. 1988) - professional boxer
- Willie Penrose (b. 1956) - Labour Party politician
- Niall Horan (b. 1993) - Singer & songwriter

Historical enrolment
Year	Enrol.	±%
1983	588	—
1993	646	+9.9%
1999	632	−2.2%
2000	601	−4.9%
2001	602	+0.2%
2002	578	−4.0%
2003	568	−1.7%
2004	549	−3.3%
2005	559	+1.8%
2006	579	+3.6%
2007	637	+10.0%
2008	645	+1.3%
2009	658	+2.0%
2010	722	+9.7%
2011	708	−1.9%
2012	703	−0.7%
2013	710	+1.0%
2014	735	+3.5%
2015	737	+0.3%
2016	709	−3.8%
2017	800	+12.8%
2018	785	−1.9%
2020	774	−1.4%
2021	774	+0.0%
2022	794	+2.6%
Source: www.irelandstats.com, www.schooldays.ie
