= St Colman's College, Claremorris =

Secondary school in County Mayo, Ireland

Coordinates: 53.73521°N 8.98076°W

Information
- School type: Secondary school
- Religious affiliation: Catholicism
- Established: 1945; 81 years ago
- Gender: Boys
- Website: www.stcolmans.ie

St Colman's College is an all-boys Catholic secondary school in Claremorris, County Mayo

== History ==
The school was founded in 1945, as a school for the boys of Claremorris to attend instead of having to travel to Ballinrobe. An Old Manor House on the Knock Road was used as the site for the school, where it has remained to the present day. The school is named in honour of St. Colman, as Claremorris is in the parish of Kilcolman.

== Notable alumni ==
- Colm Boyle, Gaelic footballer who captained the school team
- Stephen Coen, Gaelic footballer who captained the school team
- Michael Conroy, Gaelic footballer
- John Hegarty, Provost of Trinity College Dublin from 2001 - 2011 A.D..
- Pat Rabbitte, former leader of The Labour Party, graduated from the College in 1967.
- Darragh Beirne, Gaelic footballer
- Enda Hession, Gaelic footballer
- Eoin Mcgreal, Gaelic footballer

== Sporting honours ==
- Hogan Cup : (1) 1977
- Connacht Colleges Senior Football Championship : (7) 1970, 1977, 1981, 2009, 2017, 2019, 2025
