= Hogan Cup =

Gaelic football competition and trophy

All-Ireland PPS Hogan Cup
- Current season or competition: 2026 Hogan Cup
- Irish: Craobh Peile Iarbhunscoileanna na hÉireann
- Code: Gaelic football
- Founded: 1946; 80 years ago
- Region: Ireland (GAA)
- Trophy: Hogan Cup
- No. of teams: 4
- Title holders: Coláiste Mhuire, Mullingar (1st title)
- First winner: St Patrick's Grammar School, Armagh
- Most titles: St Jarlath's College, Tuam (12 titles)
- Sponsors: Masita
- TV partner: TG4
- Official website: Hogan Cup at gaa.ie

The Hogan Cup (Irish: Corn Uí Ógáin), also known as the All-Ireland Post Primary Schools Senior A Football Championship, is the top level Gaelic football championship for secondary schools (sometimes referred to as colleges) in Ireland. The competition itself is regularly referred to by the trophy's name.

The current champions are Coláiste Mhuire, Mullingar who won the cup for the first time by defeating Tralee CBS in the final.

St Jarlath's College, Tuam hold the record number of titles, winning their twelfth in 2002, and have appeared as runners-up in a further fourteen finals.

The competition commenced in 1946 but was not played in the years 1949 to 1956. The cup is named after Brother Thomas Hogan. The Hogan Stand in Croke Park is named after his brother Michael Hogan. Since its beginning, there have been three different cups presented. The original cup was last presented in 1960, and now resides in St Jarlath's College. A newly designed cup was introduced in 1961. This cup itself was replaced in 2014 with a new design.

To increase participation the Colleges All-Ireland senior "B" championship was created in 1975, and a senior "C" championship commenced in 2000.

== Format ==
Provincial Championships

The four provinces each organise an A championship:

- Connacht Colleges Senior Football Championship
- Leinster Colleges Senior Football Championship
- Munster Colleges Senior Football Championship (Corn Uí Mhuirí)
- Ulster Colleges Senior Football Championship (MacRory Cup)

All-Ireland

The four provincial "A" champions compete in two knock-out semi-finals. The final is played at Croke Park on St. Patrick's Day.

== Wins listed by college ==
#	Team	Wins	Years	Runners-up	Years
1	St Jarlath's College, Tuam	12	1947, 1958, 1960, 1961, 1964, 1966, 1974, 1978, 1982, 1984, 1994, 2002	14	1946, 1962, 1967, 1973, 1976, 1979, 1983, 1990, 1992, 1993, 1999, 2001, 2003, 2011
2	St Colman's College, Newry	8	1967, 1975, 1986, 1988, 1993, 1998, 2010, 2011	2	1957, 1978
3	St Patrick's College, Maghera	6	1989, 1990, 1995, 2003, 2013, 2025	6	1980, 1984, 1994, 1996, 2014, 2016
4	St Mel's College, Longford	4	1948, 1962, 1963, 1987	3	1961, 1964, 1988
4	Coláiste Chríost Rí, Cork	4	1968, 1970, 1983, 1985	1	1989
4	St Brendan's College, Killarney	4	1969, 1992, 2016, 2017	5	1963, 1974, 2008, 2010, 2022
7	Carmelite College, Moate	3	1976, 1980, 1981	2	1975, 1977
7	St Patrick's Classical School, Navan	3	2000, 2001, 2004	3	2013, 2006, 1991
7	Omagh CBS	3	2007, 2023, 2024	—	—N/a
10	St Patrick's Academy, Dungannon	2	1997, 2008	1	2004
10	Pobalscoil Chorca Dhuibhne, Daingean Uí Chúis	2	2014, 2015	—	—N/a
12	St Patrick's Grammar School, Armagh	1	1946	2	1947, 2000
12	St Nathy's College, Ballaghaderreen	1	1957	1	1959
12	St. Joseph's Fairview	1	1959	—	—N/a
12	St Columb's College, Derry	1	1965	—	—N/a
12	St Mary's CBS, Belfast	1	1971	—	—N/a
12	St Patrick's College, Cavan	1	1972	1	1948
12	Franciscan College, Gormanston	1	1973	2	1958, 1974
12	St Colman's College, Claremorris	1	1977	2	1981, 2025
12	Ardscoil Rís, Dublin	1	1979	—	—N/a
12	St Fachtna's, Skibbereen	1	1991	1	1982
12	Intermediate School, Killorglin	1	1996	—	—N/a
12	Good Counsel College, New Ross	1	1999	1	1995
12	Knockbeg College, Carlow	1	2005	—	—N/a
12	Abbey CBS, Newry	1	2006	—	—N/a
12	Coláiste na Sceilge, Caherciveen	1	2009	—	—N/a
12	St Mary's Secondary School, Edenderry	1	2012	1	2009
12	St Ronan's College, Lurgan	1	2018	—	—N/a
12	St Michael's College, Enniskillen	1	2019	2	2002, 2012
12	Naas C.B.S.	1	2022	1	2019
12	Coláiste Mhuire, Mullingar	1	2026	–	—N/a
12	Tralee CBS	0		2	2017, 2026

== Finals listed by year ==
The most common Hogan Cup finals pairings both feature St Jarlath's College, Tuam. They have faced St Colman's College, Newry, four times, winning once, and St Patrick's College, Maghera, four times, winning twice.

Year	Province	Winner	Score	Score	Opponent	Province	Report
2026	Leinster	Coláiste Mhuire, Mullingar	3-11	1-16	Tralee CBS	Munster	
2025	Ulster	St Patrick's College, Maghera^{(6)}	2-08	0-04	St Colman's College, Claremorris	Connacht	
2024	Ulster	Omagh CBS^{(3)}	3-14	0-11	Mercy Mounthawk, Tralee	Munster	
2023	Ulster	Omagh CBS^{(2)}	6-16	3-08	Summerhill College, Sligo	Connacht	
2022	Leinster	Naas C.B.S.	3-14	2-15	St Brendan's College, Killarney	Munster	
2021	Competition cancelled due to the COVID-19 pandemic						
2020	Competition cancelled due to the COVID-19 pandemic						
2019	Ulster	St Michael's College, Enniskillen	1-12	1-11	Naas C.B.S.	Leinster	
2018	Ulster	St Ronan's College, Lurgan	1-10	1-09	Rice College, Westport	Connacht	
2017	Munster	St Brendan's College, Killarney^{(4)}	0-18	0-10	St Peter's, Wexford	Leinster	
2016	Munster	St Brendan's College, Killarney^{(3)}	2-13	2-06	St Patrick's College, Maghera	Ulster	
2015	Munster	Pobalscoil Chorca Dhuibhne, Daingean Uí Chúis^{(2)}	1-12	2-05	Roscommon CBS	Connacht	
2014	Munster	Pobalscoil Chorca Dhuibhne, Daingean Uí Chúis	1-08	1-06	St Patrick's College, Maghera	Ulster	
2013	Ulster	St Patrick's College, Maghera^{(5)}	1-20	1-10	St Patrick's Classical School, Navan	Leinster	
2012	Leinster	St Mary's Secondary School, Edenderry	1-16	0-06	St Michael's College, Enniskillen	Ulster	
2011	Ulster	St Colman's College, Newry^{(8)}	2-10	0-15	St Jarlath's College, Tuam	Connacht	
2010	Ulster	St Colman's College, Newry^{(7)}	1-18	3-05	St Brendan's College, Killarney	Munster	
2009	Munster	Coláiste na Sceilge, Cahersiveen	1-09	0-10	St Mary's Secondary School, Edenderry	Leinster	
2008	Ulster	St Patrick's Academy, Dungannon^{(2)}	1-09	1-07	St Brendan's College, Killarney	Munster	
2007	Ulster	Omagh CBS	0-16	0-07	St Mary's CBS, Tralee	Munster	
2006	Ulster	Abbey CBS, Newry	2-15 (aet)	2-13 (aet)	St Patrick's Classical School, Navan	Leinster	
2005	Leinster	Knockbeg College, Carlow	2-08	0-11	St Mary's College, Galway	Connacht	
2004	Leinster	St Patrick's Classical School, Navan^{(3)}	1-11	1-10	St Patrick's Academy, Dungannon	Ulster	
2003	Ulster	St Patrick's College, Maghera^{(4)}	1-09	2-04	St Jarlath's College, Tuam	Connacht	
2002	Connacht	St Jarlath's College, Tuam^{(12)}	3-13	0-06	St Michael's College, Enniskillen	Ulster	
2001	Leinster	St Patrick's Classical School, Navan^{(2)}	2-10	2-08	St Jarlath's College, Tuam	Connacht	
2000	Leinster	St Patrick's Classical School, Navan	0-11	1-06	St Patrick's Grammar School, Armagh	Ulster	
1999	Leinster	Good Counsel College, New Ross	1-11	1-07	St Jarlath's College, Tuam	Connacht	
1998	Ulster	St Colman's College, Newry^{(6)}	2-14	1-07	Coláiste Eoin, Dublin	Leinster	
1997	Ulster	St Patrick's Academy, Dungannon	1-10	0-03	St Gerald's College, Castlebar	Connacht	
1996	Munster	Intermediate School, Killorglin	4-08	1-14	St Patrick's College, Maghera	Ulster	
1995	Ulster	St Patrick's College, Maghera^{(3)}	2-11	1-06	Good Counsel College, New Ross	Leinster	
1994	Connacht	St Jarlath's College, Tuam^{(11)}	3-11	0-09	St Patrick's College, Maghera	Ulster	
1993	Ulster	St Colman's College, Newry^{(5)}	2-10	1-09	St Jarlath's College, Tuam	Connacht	
1992	Munster	St Brendan's College, Killarney^{(2)}	0-09	0-05	St Jarlath's College, Tuam	Connacht	
1991	Munster	St Fachtna's, Skibbereen	2-09	0-07	St Patrick's Classical School, Navan	Leinster	
1990; Replay	Ulster	St Patrick's College, Maghera^{(2)}	1-04; 1-11	0-07; 0-13	St Jarlath's College, Tuam	Connacht	
1989; Replay	Ulster	St Patrick's College, Maghera	1-05; 2-15	0-08; 1-06	Coláiste Chríost Rí, Cork	Munster	
1988	Ulster	St Colman's College, Newry^{(4)}	1-11	1-07	St Mel's College, Longford	Leinster	
1987	Leinster	St Mel's College, Longford^{(4)}	0-08	1-04	St Mary's College, Galway	Connacht	
1986	Ulster	St Colman's College, Newry^{(3)}	3-10	0-07	St David's, Artane	Leinster	
1985	Munster	Coláiste Chríost Rí, Cork^{(4)}	1-09	0-09	Summerhill College, Sligo	Connacht	
1984	Connacht	St Jarlath's College, Tuam^{(10)}	0-10	2-03	St Patrick's College, Maghera	Ulster	
1983	Munster	Coláiste Chríost Rí, Cork^{(3)}	3-06	2-05	St Jarlath's College, Tuam	Connacht	
1982; Replay	Connacht	St Jarlath's College, Tuam^{(9)}	1-07; 1-08	1-07; 0-08	St Fachtna's, Skibbereen	Munster	
1981	Leinster	Carmelite College, Moate^{(3)}	2-02	1-04	St Colman's College, Claremorris	Connacht	
1980	Leinster	Carmelite College, Moate^{(2)}	0-12	1-08	St Patrick's College, Maghera	Ulster	
1979; Replay	Leinster	Ardscoil Rís, Dublin	0-10; 2-09	0-10; 1-10	St Jarlath's College, Tuam	Connacht	
1978	Connacht	St Jarlath's College, Tuam^{(8)}	2-11	2-04	St Colman's College, Newry	Ulster	
1977	Connacht	St Colman's College, Claremorris	1-11	1-10	Carmelite College, Moate	Leinster	
1976	Leinster	Carmelite College, Moate	1-10	0-11	St Jarlath's College, Tuam	Connacht	
1975	Ulster	St Colman's College, Newry^{(2)}	1-07	2-03	Carmelite College, Moate	Leinster	
1974	Connacht	St Jarlath's College, Tuam^{(7)}	4-11	2-11	Franciscan College, Gormanston	Leinster	
1973	Leinster	Franciscan College, Gormanston	1-07	0-08	St Jarlath's College, Tuam	Connacht	
1972	Ulster	St Patrick's College, Cavan	2-11	1-05	St Brendan's College, Killarney	Munster	
1971	Ulster	St Mary's CBS, Belfast	1-13	1-07	Colaiste Iosagain, Ballyvourney	Munster	
1970	Munster	Coláiste Chríost Rí, Cork^{(2)}	4-05	1-13	St Malachy's College, Belfast	Ulster	
1969	Munster	St Brendan's College, Killarney	1-13	3-03	St Mary's College, Galway	Connacht	
1968	Munster	Coláiste Chríost Rí, Cork	3-11	1-10	Belcamp OMI, Dublin	Leinster	
1967	Ulster	St Colman's College, Newry	1-08	1-07	St Jarlath's College, Tuam	Connacht	
1966	Connacht	St Jarlath's College, Tuam^{(6)}	1-10	1-09	St Finian's College, Mullingar	Leinster	
1965; Replay	Ulster	St Columb's College, Derry	0-09; 0-11	0-09; 1-07	Belcamp OMI, Dublin	Leinster	
1964; Replay	Connacht	St Jarlath's College, Tuam^{(5)}	0-11; 1-10	1-08; 0-04	St Mel's College, Longford	Leinster	
1963	Leinster	St Mel's College, Longford^{(3)}	1-06	2-02	St Brendan's College, Killarney	Munster	
1962	Leinster	St Mel's College, Longford^{(2)}	3-11	2-12	St Jarlath's College, Tuam	Connacht	
1961	Connacht	St Jarlath's College, Tuam^{(4)}	2-08	1-08	St Mel's College, Longford	Leinster	
1960	Connacht	St Jarlath's College, Tuam^{(3)}	3-10	3-07	St Finian's College, Mullingar	Leinster	
1959	Leinster	St Joseph's, Fairview	3-09	2-08	St Nathy's College, Ballaghaderreen	Connacht	
1958	Connacht	St Jarlath's College, Tuam^{(2)}	0-09	1-04	Franciscan College, Gormanston	Leinster	
1957	Connacht	St Nathy's College, Ballaghaderreen	1-07	0-04	St Colman's College, Newry	Ulster	
1956	No competition (1949–1956)						
1955	No competition (1949–1956)						
1954	No competition (1949–1956)						
1953	No competition (1949–1956)						
1952	No competition (1949–1956)						
1951	No competition (1949–1956)						
1950	No competition (1949–1956)						
1949	No competition (1949–1956)						
1948	Leinster	St Mel's College, Longford	4-07	3-03	St Patrick's College, Cavan	Ulster	
1947	Connacht	St Jarlath's College, Tuam	4-10	3-08	St Patrick's Grammar School, Armagh	Ulster	
1946	Ulster	St Patrick's Grammar School, Armagh	3-11	4-07	St Jarlath's College, Tuam	Connacht	

== Wins listed by province ==
Province	Wins	Last win	Biggest contributor	Wins
Ulster	26	2025; St Patrick's College, Maghera	St Colman's Newry	8
Leinster	18	2026; Coláiste Mhuire, Mullingar	St Mel's Longford	4
Connacht	14	2002; St Jarlath's Tuam	St Jarlath's Tuam	12
Munster	13	2017; St Brendan's Killarney	St Brendan's Killarney; Coláiste Chríost Rí	4

== Records and statistics ==
=== Final ===
- Most wins: 12:
  - St Jarlath's College (1947, 1958, 1960, 1961, 1964, 1966, 1974, 1978, 1982, 1984, 1994, 2002)
- Most consecutive wins: 2:
  - St Jarlath's College (1960, 1961)
  - St Mel's College (1962, 1963)
  - Carmelite College (1980, 1981)
  - St Patrick's College (1989, 1990)
  - St Patrick's Classical School (2000, 2001)
  - St Colman's College (2010, 2011)
  - Pobalscoil Chorca Dhuibhne (2014, 2015)
  - St Brendan's College (2016, 2017)
  - Omagh CBS (2023, 2024)
- Most second-place finishes: 14:
  - St Jarlath's College (1946, 1962, 1967, 1973, 1976, 1979, 1983, 1990, 1992, 1993, 1999, 2001, 2003, 2011)
- Most consecutive second-place finishes: 2:
  - St Jarlath's College (1992, 1993)
- Most appearances: 26:
  - St Jarlath's College (1946, 1947, 1958, 1960, 1961, 1962, 1964, 1966, 1967, 1973, 1974, 1976, 1978, 1979, 1982, 1983, 1984, 1990, 1992, 1993, 1994, 1999, 2001, 2002, 2003, 2011)

=== Teams ===
==== Gaps ====
Longest gaps between successive championship titles:

- 24 years: St Mel's College (1963-1987)
- 24 years: St Brendan's College (1992-2016)
- 23 years: St Brendan's College (1969-1992)
- 14 years: St Mel's College (1948-1962)
- 13 years: Coláiste Chríost Rí (1970-1983)

== Sources ==
- Gerry Buckley (2003). Fifty Years of the Hogan Cup. ISBN 0-9501758-8-9.
- "Dungannon in Hogan defeat". BBC Sport. 3 May 2004.
- "How Knockbeg won the Hogan Cup". Laois GAA.
- "Abbey CBS have that little bit extra". Down GAA.
