= Connacht Colleges Senior Football Championship =

Gaelic football competition

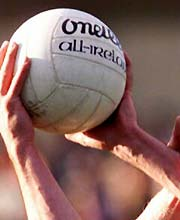

Connacht colleges senior football "A" championship, is the top level Gaelic football competition for secondary schools in Connacht. They compete for the Aonghus Murphy Memorial Cup.

The winners advance to the Hogan Cup, the All-Ireland colleges senior "A" football championship.

St Colman's College, Claremorris beat St Gerald's College, Castlebar 0-15 to 1-11 in an all-Mayo final in McHale Park on 15 March to win the 2019 championship. The teams met in the Connacht "A" League Final earlier in the year when St Gerald's came out the victors.

St Gerald's College, Castlebar beat Summerhill College, Sligo 1-13 to 0-10 in Charlestown GAA Club on 7 March to win the 2020 championship. The teams met in the Connacht "A" League Final earlier in the year when St Gerald's also came out the victors.

St Jarlath's College, Tuam (with 49 wins, the competition's most successful team) beat St Colman's College, Claremorris by a scoreline of 3-06 to 0-09 on 12 February 2022 in a crowded Tuam Stadium in tough conditions to add to their record of 48 titles and make it 49. Man-of-the-match Paddy Egan (from the Corofin club) scored the two crucial goals for St Jarlath's College.

== Wins listed by college ==
#	Team	Wins	Years won
1	St Jarlath's College, Tuam	49	1932, 1933, 1934, 1935, 1936, 1937, 1938, 1939, 1943, 1944, 1945, 1946, 1947, 1950, 1951, 1953, 1956, 1958, 1960, 1961, 1962, 1963, 1964, 1965, 1966, 1967, 1972, 1973, 1974, 1976, 1978, 1979, 1982, 1983, 1984, 1990, 1992, 1993, 1994, 1999, 2000, 2001, 2002, 2003, 2007, 2008, 2011, 2012, 2022
=2	St Mary's College, Galway	9	1952, 1969, 1986, 1987, 1988, 1991, 2004, 2005, 2006
=2	Summerhill College, Sligo	9	1930, 1931, 1954, 1955, 1971, 1975, 1985, 2016, 2023
=2	St Gerald's College, Castlebar	9	1929, 1996, 1997, 2010, 2013, 2014, 2020, 2024, 2026
5	St Colman's College, Claremorris	7	1970, 1977, 1981, 2009, 2017, 2019, 2025
6	Roscommon CBS	6	1940, 1941, 1942, 1948, 1998, 2015
7	St Nathy's, Ballaghaderreen	5	1928, 1949, 1957, 1959, 1968
8	Tuam CBS (St Patrick's College)	3	1980, 1989, 1995
9	Rice College, Westport	1	2018

== Finals listed by year ==
Year	Winner	Score	Opponent	Score
2026	St Gerald's College, Castlebar	1-19	St. Muirdeach's College, Ballina	3-07
2025	St Colman's College, Claremorris	2-09	Summerhill College, Sligo	1-09
2024	St Gerald's College, Castlebar		Coláiste Baile Chláir	
2023	Summerhill College, Sligo	0-16	Coláiste Baile Chláir	1-09
2022	St Jarlath's College, Tuam	3-06	St Colman's College, Claremorris	0-09
2021	Cancelled due to the impact of the COVID-19 pandemic on Gaelic games			
2020	St Gerald's College, Castlebar	1-13	Summerhill College, Sligo	0-10
2019	St Colman's College, Claremorris	0-15	St Gerald's College, Castlebar	1-11
2018	Rice College, Westport	1-13	St Attracta's, Tubbercurry	0-10
2017	St Colman's College, Claremorris	2-08	St Attracta's, Tubbercurry	0-08
2016	Summerhill College, Sligo	1-12	St Attracta's, Tubbercurry	0-13
2015	Roscommon CBS	0-08	Summerhill College, Sligo	0-07
2014	St Gerald's College, Castlebar	3-11	St Attracta's, Tubbercurry	3-07
2013	St Gerald's College, Castlebar	0-09	St Jarlath's College, Tuam	1-04
2012	St Jarlath's College, Tuam		Summerhill College, Sligo	
2011	St Jarlath's College, Tuam		Summerhill College, Sligo	
2010	St Gerald's College, Castlebar		Summerhill College, Sligo	
2009	St Colman's College, Claremorris		St Gerald's College, Castlebar	
2008	St Jarlath's College, Tuam		St Colman's College, Claremorris	
2007	St Jarlath's College, Tuam		St Gerald's College, Castlebar	
2006	St Mary's College, Galway		St Gerald's College, Castlebar	
2005	St Mary's College, Galway		Holy Rosary Mountbellew	
2004	St Mary's College, Galway		St Gerald's College, Castlebar	
2003	St Jarlath's College, Tuam		Ballyhaunis Community School	
2002	**St Jarlath's College, Tuam**		St Colman's College, Claremorris	
2001	St Jarlath's College, Tuam		St Joseph's College, Ballinasloe	
2000	St Jarlath's College, Tuam		St Colman's College, Claremorris	
1999	St Jarlath's College, Tuam		St Patrick's College, Tuam (Tuam CBS)	
1998	Roscommon CBS	1-14	St Jarlath's College, Tuam	1-6
1997	St Gerald's College, Castlebar			
1996	St Gerald's College, Castlebar			
1995	St Patrick's College, Tuam (Tuam CBS)	0-14	St Jarlath's College, Tuam	1-07
1994	**St Jarlath's College, Tuam**			
1993	St Jarlath's College, Tuam			
1992	St Jarlath's College, Tuam			
1991	St Mary's College, Galway			
1990	St Jarlath's College, Tuam			
1989	Tuam CBS (St Patrick's College)	0-06	St Mary's College, Galway	0-04
1988	St Mary's College, Galway			
1987	St Mary's College, Galway			
1986	St Mary's College, Galway			
1985	Summerhill College, Sligo			
1984	**St Jarlath's College, Tuam**	1-09	Tuam CBS (St Patrick's College)	0-01
1983	St Jarlath's College, Tuam	3-11	Tuam CBS (St Patrick's College)	3-03
1982	**St Jarlath's College, Tuam**		St Colman's College, Claremorris	
1981	St Colman's College, Claremorris	0-06	St Jarlath's College, Tuam	0-05
1980	Tuam CBS (St Patrick's College)	1-04	St Jarlath's College, Tuam	0-05
1979	St Jarlath's College, Tuam			
1978	**St Jarlath's College, Tuam**			
1977	**St Colman's College, Claremorris**		St Jarlath's College, Tuam	
1976	St Jarlath's College, Tuam			
1975	Summerhill College, Sligo			
1974	**St Jarlath's College, Tuam**			
1973	St Jarlath's College, Tuam			
1972	St Jarlath's College, Tuam			
1971	Summerhill College, Sligo			
1970	St Colman's College, Claremorris			
1969	St Mary's College, Galway			
1968	St Nathy's, Ballaghaderreen			
1967	St Jarlath's College, Tuam			
1966	**St Jarlath's College, Tuam**			
1965	St Jarlath's College, Tuam			
1964	**St Jarlath's College, Tuam**			
1963	St Jarlath's College, Tuam			
1962	St Jarlath's College, Tuam			
1961	**St Jarlath's College, Tuam**			
1960	**St Jarlath's College, Tuam**			
1959	St Nathy's, Ballaghaderreen			
1958	**St Jarlath's College, Tuam**			
1957	**St Nathy's, Ballaghaderreen**			
1956	St Jarlath's College, Tuam			
1955	Summerhill College, Sligo			
1954	Summerhill College, Sligo			
1953	St Jarlath's College, Tuam			
1952	St Mary's College, Galway			
1951	St Jarlath's College, Tuam			
1950	St Jarlath's College, Tuam			
1949	St Nathy's, Ballaghaderreen			
1948	Roscommon CBS			
1947	**St Jarlath's College, Tuam**		Roscommon CBS	
1946	St Jarlath's College, Tuam			
1945	St Jarlath's College, Tuam			
1944	St Jarlath's College, Tuam			
1943	St Jarlath's College, Tuam			
1942	Roscommon CBS			
1941	Roscommon CBS			
1940	Roscommon CBS			
1939	St Jarlath's College, Tuam			
1938	St Jarlath's College, Tuam			
1937	St Jarlath's College, Tuam			
1936	St Jarlath's College, Tuam			
1935	St Jarlath's College, Tuam			
1934	St Jarlath's College, Tuam			
1933	St Jarlath's College, Tuam			
1932	St Jarlath's College, Tuam			
1931	Summerhill College, Sligo			
1930	Summerhill College, Sligo			
1929	St Gerard's, Castlebar			
1928	St Nathy's, Ballaghaderreen			

- Teams in **bold** went on to win the **Hogan Cup** in the same year.

== See also ==
- Hogan Cup
- Leinster Championship
- Corn Uí Mhuirí (Munster Championship)
- MacRory Cup (Ulster Championship)
