= 2023 Hogan Cup =

- Dates: 25 February – 16 March 2023
- Teams: 4
- Champions: Omagh CBS (2nd title); Eoin McElholm (captain); Diarmuid McNulty (manager)
- Runners-up: Summerhill College; James Donlon (captain); Mark Breheny (manager); Joe Neary (manager)

Tournament statistics
- Matches played: 3
- Goals scored: 16 (5.33 per match)
- Points scored: 50 (16.67 per match)
- Top scorer(s): Ruairí McCullagh (3-04); Eoin McElholm (2-07)

The 2023 Hogan Cup was the 68th staging of the Hogan Cup since its establishment by the Gaelic Athletic Association in 1946. The competition ran from 25 February to 16 March 2023.

Naas CBS were the defending champions, however, they were beaten by Omagh CBS in the semi-final.

The final was played on 16 March 2023 at Croke Park in Dublin, between Omagh CBS and Summerhill College, in what was their first ever meeting in the final. Omagh CBS won the match by 6–16 to 3–08 to claim their second Hogan Cup title overall and a first title in 16 years.

Ruairí McCullagh (3-04) and Eoin McElholm (2-07) were the top scorers.

== Qualification ==
Province	Champions
Connacht	Summerhill College
Leinster	Naas CBS
Munster	St Brendan's College
Ulster	Omagh CBS

== Results ==
=== Semi-finals ===
25 February 2023 Semi-final	Summerhill College	2-11 - 1-11	St Brendan's College	St Jarlath's Park
	G Lynch 1-1 (1-0 pen), R Niland 1-1, D Walsh 0-3, S O’Neill 0-3 (0-2m), E Rooney 0-2 (0-1f), J Campbell 0-1.	Report	A Hennigan 1-1, L Crowley 0-3 (0-1f), C Cronin 0-2f, D Ryan 0-1, S Fitzgerald 0-1, T Moynihan 0-1, J Moynihan 0-1, C Lynch 0-1.	Referee: C Ryan (Galway)

25 February 2023 Semi-final	Omagh CBS	4-14 - 0-08	Naas CBS	St Tiernach's Park
	C Owens (1-4, 1 free), R McCullagh (1-2, 1 free), L Óg Mossey (1-1), Caolan Donnelly (1-0), E McElholm (0-2), N Farry (0-1), T Haigney (0-1), Charlie Donnelly (0-1), L McCullagh (0-1), N McCarney (0-1).	Report	R Sinkey (0-3), C Lennox 0-3 (3 frees), C Boran (0-1), T Kelly (0-1).	Referee: M Farrelly (Cavan)

=== Final ===
16 March 2023 Final	Omagh CBS	6-16 - 3-08	Summerhill College	Croke Park
	E McElholm (2-5), R McCullagh (2-2); C Owens (0-5, 1 free); L Og Mossey (1-1); T Haigney (1-0); C Donnelly (0-2), N McCarney (0-1).	Report	C Flynn (2-0); S O'Neill (1-1); R Niland (1 free), E Rooney (0-2); J Donlon (1 45), J Walsh, M McDaniel (0-1).	Referee: B Cawley (Kildare)

== Statistics ==
=== Top scorers ===
Rank	Player	Club	Tally	Total	Matches	Average
1	Ruairí McCullagh	Omagh CBS	3-04	13	2	6.50
1	Eoin McElholm	Omagh CBS	2-07	13	2	6.50
3	Conor Owens	Omagh CBS	1-09	12	2	6.00
4	Liam Óg Mossey	Omagh CBS	2-02	8	2	4.00
5	Shea O'Neill	Summerhill College	1-04	7	2	3.50
