= 2022 Hogan Cup =

- Dates: 26 February – 17 March 2022
- Teams: 4
- Sponsor: Masita
- Champions: Naas CBS (1st title); Fionn Tully (captain); Jack McKevitt (captain); Pádraic Cribben (manager)
- Runners-up: St Brendan's College; Cian McMahon (captain); Kevin Cronin (manager)

Tournament statistics
- Matches played: 3
- Goals scored: 11 (3.67 per match)
- Points scored: 65 (21.67 per match)
- Top scorer(s): Kevin Cummins (2-08)

The 2022 Hogan Cup was the 67th staging of the Hogan Cup since its establishment by the Gaelic Athletic Association in 1946. It was the first Croke Cup to be completed in three years as the 2020 and 2021 competitions were cancelled due to the COVID-19 pandemic. The competition ran from 26 February to 17 March 2022.

St Michael's College were the defending champions, however, they were beaten in the MacRory Cup.

The final was played on 17 March 2022 at Croke Park in Dublin, between Naas CBS and St Brendan's College, in what was their first ever meeting in the final. Naas CBS won the match by 3–14 to 2–15 to claim their first ever Hogan Cup title.

Kevin Cummins was the top scorer with 2-08.

== Qualification ==
Province	Champions
Connacht	St Jarlath's College
Leinster	Naas CBS
Munster	St Brendan's College
Ulster	St Mary's Grammar School

== Results ==
=== Semi-finals ===
26 February 2022 Semi-final	Naas CBS	3-14 - 1-04	St Jarlath's College	Tubber Grounds
	N Dolan (2-1), S Broderick (1-2), G Thompson (0-4, 1f), K Cummins (0-3, 2fs), F Cooke (0-2); C Dalton (0-1), D Crowley (0-1).	Report	B Cogger (1-0), C Heneghan (0-2, 1f), S Birmingham (0-2, 1f).	Referee: P Murphy (Carlow)

26 February 2022 Semi-final	St Brendan's College	1-10 - 1-08	St Mary's Grammar School	Bekan COE
	C McMahon (1-2), W Shine (0-3, 2 frees), K O’Sullivan and L Crowley (0-2 each), J Kelleher (0-1).	Report	T Shivers ( 1-1), C Johnston ( 0-2), R McEldowney, B Kelly, R Forbes, N O’Donnell and J Cassidy ( 0-1 each).	Referee: L Devenney (Mayo)

=== Final ===
17 March 2022 Final	Naas CBS	3-14 - 2-15	St Brendan's College	Croke Park
	K Cummins (2-5, 0-2 frees); G Thompson (0-3, 0-1 free); F Cooke (1-0); S Broderick, N Dolan (0-2 each); D Crowley, C Dalton (0-1).		W Shine (1-5, 1f), C McMahon (0-4, 2f), M O’Shea (1-0), C Foley and L Crowley (0-3 each).	Referee: P Faloon (Down)

== Statistics ==
=== Top scorers ===
Rank	Player	Club	Tally	Total	Matches	Average
1	Kevin Cummins	Naas CBS	2-08	14	2	7.00
2	William Shine	St Brendan's College	1-08	11	2	5.50
3	Niall Dolan	Naas CBS	2-03	9	2	4.50
3	Cian McMahon	St Brendan's College	1-06	9	2	4.50
5	Seán Broderick	Naas CBS	1-04	7	2	3.50
5	Gavin Thompson	Naas CBS	0-07	7	2	3.50
