= Eoin McEvoy =

Irish Gaelic footballer

Personal information
- Native name: Eoghan Mac Fhiobhuior (Irish)
- Born: 2003 (age 22–23)

Sport
- Sport: Gaelic football
- Position: Centre back
Club
- Years: Club
- 2021–: Magherafelt
Inter-county
- Years: County
- 2022–: Derry
Inter-county titles
- Ulster titles: 2
- All-Irelands: 0
- NFL: 1

Eoin McEvoy (born 2003) is an Irish Gaelic footballer who plays for the Derry county team and for the Magherafelt club.

== Playing career ==
=== College ===
In 2022, McEvoy was captain of the St Mary's Grammar School team that reached the final of the MacRory Cup. McEvoy lifted the cup after the Magherafelt school's 2–9 to 0–8 win over Holy Trinity, Cookstown. St Mary's went on to lose the Hogan Cup semi-final by two points to St Brendan's College, Killarney.

=== Club ===
McEvoy joined the Magherafelt senior team in 2021, and played in his first county final in 2023. McEvoy lined out at centre back for the final against Glen. McEvoy scored a point in the first half, but Glen ran out winners after a strong second half.

=== Inter-county ===
==== Minor and under-20 ====
On 2 July 2021, McEvoy was at centre back for Derry's delayed 2020 Ulster minor final win over Monaghan. On 18 July 2021, McEvoy scored a point in the All-Ireland final as Derry defeated Kerry to win the 2020 All-Ireland Minor Football Championship. McEvoy was named at centre back on the Minor Football Team of the Year.

McEvoy was on the Derry under-20 panel in 2023, but didn't feature due to a rule that bars players from playing with their U20 and senior teams within seven days of each other. Derry contested the Ulster final against Down on 26 April, but McEvoy didn't play as Derry lost the final by 2–11 to 0–9.

==== Senior ====
McEvoy joined the Derry senior panel ahead of the 2022 season. He didn't feature in the league or championship, as Derry won their first Ulster championship in 24 years.

McEvoy made his National League debut on 30 January 2023, starting at full back in a twelve-point win over Limerick. He kept his place for the rest of the league as Derry were promoted to Division 1 with a game to spare. McEvoy didn't start the Division 2 final against Dublin, coming on as a late sub in the 4–6 to 0–11 defeat. McEvoy made his championship debut on 28 April, starting the game and scoring a point in a win over Fermanagh. Derry reached the Ulster final for the second consecutive year after a semi-final win over Monaghan. On 14 May, McEvoy started the final, playing the full game as Derry beat Armagh after a penalty shoot-out. On 16 July, McEvoy played in Derry's All-Ireland semi-final loss to defending champions Kerry. At the end of the season, McEvoy received his first All-Star nomination, and was also nominated for the Young Footballer of the Year award.

In the 2024 league, Derry topped the table, qualifying for the final against Dublin. McEvoy started the final at centre back, scoring 2–2 and was man of the match as Derry won the league for the first time since 2008 after a penalty shoot-out win.

== Honours ==
Derry

- National Football League: 2024
- Dr McKenna Cup: 2023, 2024
- Ulster Senior Football Championship: 2022, 2023
- All-Ireland Minor Football Championship: 2020
- Ulster Minor Football Championship: 2020

St Mary's Grammar School

- MacRory Cup: 2022 (c)

Individual

- Electric Ireland GAA Minor Football Team of the Year: 2020
- PwC GAA/GPA Player of the Month March 2024
- GAA Higher Education Rising Stars Football Team: 2025
