= Conor McCluskey =

Irish Gaelic footballer

Personal information
- Nickname: Clucky
- Born: 1999 (age 26–27)

Sport
- Sport: Gaelic football
- Position: Left corner back
Club
- Years: Club
- Magherafelt
Club titles
- Derry titles: 1
Inter-county
- Years: County
- 2018–: Derry
Inter-county titles
- Ulster titles: 2
- All-Irelands: 0
- NFL: 1
- All Stars: 1

Conor McCluskey (born 1999) is an Irish Gaelic footballer who plays for the Derry county team and for the Magherafelt club.

== Playing career ==
=== College ===
On 17 March 2017, McCluskey was a corner-back on the St Mary's Grammar School team for the MacRory Cup final against St Colman's College, Newry. St Mary's won the cup for the first time with a 0–19 to 0–13 win. McCluskey started the Hogan Cup semi-final five days later, with St Mary's losing by a point to St Peter's College, Wexford.

=== Club ===
In the 2019 season, Magherafelt reached the final of the Derry Senior Football Championship for the first time since 1983. On 20 October, McCluskey was in the half-back line for the final against Glen. McCluskey scored a point in the second half, and Magherafelt held on to win by 0–12 to 0–11. Magherafelt reached the final again in 2020, playing Slaughtneil. McCluskey scored a point but Slaughtneil won the match by four points. McCluskey played in his third county final in 2023, with Magherafalt facing Glen once again. The match was level at half-time, but a strong second half from Glen helped them to the title.

=== Inter-county ===
==== Minor and under-20 ====
On 17 July 2016, McCluskey was at corner back as the Derry minor team faced Donegal in the Ulster final. Donegal were winners by 2–10 to 1–11. Derry lost the All-Ireland quarter-final by eleven points to Munster champions Kerry.

McCluskey played in his second Ulster final in 2017, lining out at full back against Cavan. Derry won the final by 1–22 to 2–12. On 27 August, Derry beat Dublin by three points to reach the All-Ireland final. The final against Kerry took place on September 17, with McCluskey lining out at full-back. McCluskey was replaced at half-time as Kerry's David Clifford led the Kingdom to a comfortable win. McCluskey was named at full-back on the inaugural minor team of the year at the end of the season.

On 24 June 2018, McCluskey was at centre-back for the Ulster Under-20 final against Armagh. Derry were seven-point winners. On 14 July, McCluskey lined out at full back for the All-Ireland semi-final defeat to Mayo. Derry were in the Ulster under-20 final again in 2019, facing Tyrone on 14 July. Tyrone won the match by 4–13 to 1–10.

==== Senior ====
McCluskey joined the Derry senior panel in 2018. McCluskey made his National League debut on 24 February, coming on as a substitute in a loss to Fermanagh. Derry won the Division 4 title in 2019, but McCluskey didn't feature in the final. On 19 June 2021, McCluskey was at corner back for the Division 3 league final against Offaly. Derry won the match by 0–21 to 1–6. McCluskey made his championship debut on 11 July, coming on as a substitute in a one-point loss to Donegal.

On 1 May 2022, McCluskey made his first championship start as Derry inflicted an eleven-point defeat on reigning All-Ireland champions Tyrone. McCluskey played in the semi-final win over Monaghan as Derry reached the Ulster final. The Ulster final took place on 29 May, with Derry facing Donegal. McCluskey played the entire game as Derry claimed an extra-time victory to win their first provincial title since 1998. Derry's championship came to an end at the semi-final stage, losing by five points to Galway. McCluskey received his first All-Star nomination at the end of the season.

In 2023, Derry secured promotion to Division 1 after winning their first six games, and went on to face Dublin in the Division 2 final on 2 April. Dublin won the match by 4–6 to 0–11. In the Ulster Championship semi-final, McCluskey scored his first championship goal against Monaghan as Derry reached back-to-back provincial finals. On 14 May, McCluskey played the entire game as Derry beat Armagh in a penalty shoot-out, defending their Ulster title. On 16 July, McCluskey started the All-Ireland semi-final as Derry lost to defending champions Kerry. After the All-Ireland final, McCluskey was named on The Sunday Game Team of the Year. McCluskey was also named on the All-Star team for the first time.

In the 2024 league, Derry topped the table, qualifying for the final against Dublin. McCluskey started the final at corner back, and Derry won the league for the first time since 2008 after a penalty shoot-out win.

== Honours ==
Derry

- Ulster Senior Football Championship: 2022, 2023
- National Football League: 2024
- National Football League Division 3: 2021
- National Football League Division 4: 2019
- Ulster Under-20 Football Championship: 2018
- Ulster Minor Football Championship: 2017

Magherafelt

- Derry Senior Football Championship: 2019

St Mary's Grammar School

- MacRory Cup: 2017

Individual

- All Star Award: 2023
- The Sunday Game Team of the Year: 2023
- Electric Ireland GAA Minor Star Football Team of the Year: 2017
