= St Louis Grammar School =

St Louis Grammar School may refer to:

- St Louis Grammar School, Ballymena, Northern Ireland
- St Louis Grammar School, Kilkeel, Northern Ireland
