= McAreavey =

McAreavey is a surname. Notable people with the surname include:

- John McAreavey (born 1949), Northern Irish clergyman
- John McAreavey (Gaelic footballer), nephew of the clergyman
- Michaela McAreavey (1983–2011), murdered on her honeymoon in Mauritius
- Paul McAreavey (born 1980), Northern Irish footballer
