= Garry Courtney =

Irish gastroenterologist

- Education: Trinity College Dublin
- Occupation: Gastroenterologist
- Known for: Medicine

Michael Gerard "Garry" Courtney is an Irish gastroenterologist and professor of medicine.

== Background ==
Courtney grew up in Beragh, near Omagh, County Tyrone, Northern Ireland. He was the fifth of eight children in his family. His father was a botanist from County Fermanagh. Courtney attended secondary school at Christian Brothers Grammar School, Omagh where he was classmates with Mickey Harte. He was a keen gaelic footballer and played alongside Harte in the MacRory Cup and Hogan Cup. His brother Arthur played gaelic football for Tyrone.

Courtney's older sister, Yvonne, studied medicine at University College Dublin which influenced him to also become a doctor. Before attending university in 1974, Courtney worked for a time at the famous Mother Red Cap pub in Camden Town, London. As a medical student, Courtney trained in the Adelaide Hospital. He graduated from Trinity College Dublin medical school in 1980. Courtney became a Member of RCPI in 1984 and was made a Fellow of RCPI in 1997.

== Career ==
Courtney completed his internship at Sir Patrick Dun's Hospital and the Adelaide Hospital. He then worked as a senior house officer in Dublin and Drogheda. While working at Our Lady of Lourdes Hospital, Drogheda, Courtney met his future wife, Dr. Eleanor Quinn. Courtney also worked for a time as a clinical tutor at St. James's Hospital, Dublin, alongside Dermot P. Kelleher.

Courtney moved to London in 1989, where he trained at St Thomas' Hospital under Professor Sir Richard Thompson, physician to Queen Elizabeth II. In 1995, Courtney returned to Ireland, working as a locum consultant at Beaumont Hospital, Dublin. In 1996, he was appointed as a consultant physician at St. Luke's General Hospital, Kilkenny, where he continues to practice and serves as clinical director. Soon after his arrival in Kilkenny, Courtney was elected to the South-Eastern Health Board.

Courtney is a professor of medicine and undergraduate dean at the Royal College of Surgeons in Ireland. Alongside cardiologist Dr. Yvonne Smyth, he is clinical co-lead for the Health Service Executive Acute Medicine National Clinical Programme.
