= St Patrick's Grammar School, Armagh =

School in Armagh, Northern Ireland

St Patrick's Grammar School
- Scoil Ghramadaí Naomh Pádraig

Location
- Cathedral Road; Armagh, County Armagh, BT61 7QZ; Northern Ireland

Information
- Type: Non-selective voluntary grammar school
- Motto: Fratres in Unum
- Religious affiliation: Catholic Church
- Established: 1838
- Chairman of Board of Governors: Desmond Oliver
- Principal: Declan Murray
- Staff: 100+
- Gender: All‑male
- Age: 11 to 18
- Enrollment: 889 (2021–22)
- Colours: Red, green
- Website: School Website

St Patrick's Grammar School (Irish: Scoil Ghramadaí Naomh Pádraig) is a Roman Catholic boys' voluntary grammar school in Armagh, Northern Ireland. The present‑day school was officially opened on Thursday, 27 October 1988, by the late Cardinal Tomás Ó Fiaich, then Chairman of the Board of Governors, and was the result of the amalgamation of two of Northern Ireland's oldest grammar schools – St Patrick's College and the Christian Brothers' Grammar School at Greenpark – both with traditions dating back to the 1830s.

In 2014–15 the school expanded following the closure of St Brigid's High School (Armagh) and immediately moved away from academic selection – becoming the last Catholic grammar school in the Armagh and Craigavon area to do so. Enrollment was increased to 1250, and a £3 million renovation was initiated at that time. Further expansion is planned as part of the School Enhancement Programme.

== History ==
=== St Patrick's College ===
St Patrick's College, Armagh, was established as a junior seminary on Sandy Hill by Archbishop William Crolly. It was run by diocesan priests until 1861, when the Vincentian Order (the Congregation of the Mission) took charge. The Vincentians maintained their apostolate in Armagh until the amalgamation.

=== Christian Brothers' Grammar School ===
The Irish Christian Brothers arrived in Armagh in 1851 at the invitation of Archbishop Cullen (later Ireland's first residential Cardinal). Within a few years they acquired the Greenpark site and established primary and secondary schools. The Christian Brothers' Grammar School at Greenpark built a strong academic and sporting tradition. When the Vincentian Order signalled its withdrawal, Cardinal Tomás Ó Fiaich requested that the Brothers serve as joint trustees of the new amalgamated school. Ó Fiaich was succeeded as Chairman of the Board of Governors in 1991 by Cardinal Daly and then in 1997 by Cardinal Brady.

=== Formation of St Patrick's Grammar School (1988–present) ===
In 1988, St Patrick's Grammar School was established following the amalgamation of St Patrick's College and the Christian Brothers' school at Greenpark. Brother L. Kelly, then Headmaster of St Mary's Grammar School (Belfast), was appointed as the first Headmaster and was assisted by James McKeown, Damien Woods, Paul McAvinchey, Seamus Savage, and Frank Corvan. Br. Kelly retired in 1999 to take up a post at an American university, and the long‑standing boarding tradition ended that year following the Vincentian Order's departure from Armagh. In 2016, Fr. Kevin Donaghy—the last Catholic priest to serve as headmaster in Northern Ireland and the last priest on staff at St Patrick's—retired after 17 years. His tenure included the last MacRory Cup win (1999/2000), the addition of a new music and technology block in 2003, and extensive renovations between 2015 and 2017. Mr. Dominic Clarke, a past pupil of Sacred Heart College (Omagh), was appointed the first lay headmaster in the school's 180‑year history, and Fr. Peter Clarke became the first school chaplain in 17 years.

=== Site Renovation ===
The school was awarded £4 million for site renovation in October 2013 to expand its facilities – including an extension to the school canteen and meals kitchen, new home economics classrooms, an enlarged staff room, and refurbishment of classrooms, PE departments, and other buildings, as well as permission for four mobile classrooms. The contract was awarded to GEDA Construction, with work commencing in October 2015 and finishing in June 2017. Additional funding for further renovations was secured in May 2018.

=== Amalgamation with St Brigid's High School ===
In March 2014 it was announced that St Patrick's would merge with St Brigid's High School (Armagh)—whose closure allowed all Catholic boys to attend St Patrick's. From September 2014, St Patrick's ceased academic selection and became an all‑ability school accepting boys from Armagh and surrounding areas, ensuring a broader curriculum and increased opportunities at GCSE to meet qualification reforms in Northern Ireland.

== Student Life ==
This section now focuses solely on aspects of student experience.

=== Languages ===
At St Patrick's, all students in years 8–10 study languages, with most continuing at GCSE and A-level. Two languages are offered:

- Irish language
- French language

In years 8–10, pupils receive up to two hours per week in each language. At GCSE, most study at least one language (with some opting for more), and selected students continue with A‑level studies (typically eight classes per week plus two conversation sessions with language assistants). Additionally, students from St Catherine's College (Belfast) study French at St Patrick's, and pupils whose first language is not English are often entered for a GCSE in their mother tongue.

=== Extra‑curricular Activities ===
St Patrick's offers a wide range of extra‑curricular societies, including a debating society, a Society of St Vincent de Paul group, and several music ensembles. In the music department, groups include the school orchestra, steel band, traditional group, and choir—each allocated one hour of practice per day after school. The Soundstart Project provides every Year 8 and 9 class with weekly instruction in orchestral instruments (and African drums), ensuring that each pupil leaves Year 9 able to play an instrument and read music.

=== Sports Department ===
Sports at St Patrick's include basketball, cross‑country running, Gaelic football, golf, handball, hurling, squash, and swimming. The school hosts an annual sports day toward the end of each academic year. Historically, in 1923 the headmasters of St Patrick's and St Macartan's (Monaghan) organised a Gaelic match between the two schools—later joined by St Patrick's (Cavan), St Columb's College (Derry), St Malachy's College (Belfast), and St Colman's College (Newry). The MacRory Cup—originally open only to boarding schools (with Abbey CBS becoming the first day school to win it in 1954)—saw St Patrick's dominate in its early years (winning in 1923–29, 1931, 1944–47, and 1953). After a 47‑year gap, the school won the Cup in 2000 and has since secured it 14 times (second only to St Colman's College, Newry). It was also the first winner of the All‑Ireland Colleges Hogan Cup.

=== Excursions ===
It is traditional for first‑year students to attend a residential retreat (typically at Killowen, Carlingford, or Todd's Leap) at the start of their academic life. At the end of their seven years, students attend a religious retreat and the annual school formal. The language department facilitates exchange programmes with European countries, and the Irish department promotes visits to Gaeltachts for KS3, GCSE, and A‑Level pupils. Additionally, the Physical Education department has organised trips abroad – including a student tour to Canada.

=== Community Outreach ===
Since 1990, St Patrick's has been involved with School Aid Romania (SAR), which aims to assist children in need in Romania and foster community links between Northern Ireland and Romania. SAR's activities include promoting mutual understanding, providing material assistance to relieve poverty, and improving the well‑being of young people in Romania. Staff accompanying students include Mrs. U. Lennon and Mr. N. King, and Irish TV visited the school in January 2016 to interview Year 14 pupils who had visited Romania in 2015. Since 1993, St Patrick's has travelled to Brasov in partnership with Cookstown High School, hosted visitors from local institutions in Brasov, and arranged for physiotherapists and special‑needs teachers to work with children in Brașov and Timiș County.

== Academic Achievements ==
During the summer 2006 exam season, students achieved exemplary GCSE and A-level results – making St Patrick's the top all‑boys grammar school in Northern Ireland and fifth overall. In summer 2008, 27 students attained straight As in three or more A‑level subjects (with five achieving four grade As and one achieving five). In 2016, the school was named the top all‑boys grammar school in the North based on A‑level results. The history department garnered further accolades in 2016 when pupil Eamon Livingstone secured third place in A‑level history (under the tutelage of Mrs. Julianne Denvir and Mrs. Elaine Murphy), while the journalism department saw Conor Finn gain second in A‑level journalism (a pupil of Mrs. Shauna Clements and Mrs. Maria Rafferty).

== Notable alumni ==
| Name | Born | Died | Occupation/Field | Notable achievements |
|---|---|---|---|---|
| Alexander Blane | 1850 | 1917 | Politician | Member of Parliament for South Armagh, 1885–1892 |
| Joseph Cardinal MacRory | 1861 | 1945 | Religious Leader | Archbishop of Armagh and Primate of All Ireland, 1928–1945 |
| Tomás Ó Fiaich | 1923 | 1990 | Religious Leader | Archbishop of Armagh and Primate of All Ireland, 1977–1990 |
| Patrick Magee | 1922 | 1982 | Actor | Renowned stage and film actor |
| Richard McCullen CM | 1926 | 2015 | Religious Leader | Superior General of the Vincentians, 1980–1992 |
| John Montague | 1929 | 2016 | Poet | Member of Aosdána; First Ireland Chair of Poetry. His poetry collection Time in Armagh reflects on his time as a boarder. |
| Denis Faul | 1932 | 2006 | Religious Leader/Educator | Monsignor in the Catholic Church; President of St Patrick's Academy, Dungannon |
| Seamus Mallon | 1936 | 2020 | Politician | Former Deputy First Minister of Northern Ireland |
| Paul Muldoon | 1951 | | Poet/Academic | Professor of Creative Writing at Princeton University; Fellow of the Royal Society of Literature; Member of the American Academy of Arts and Sciences |
| Seamus McGarvey | 1967 | | Cinematographer | Acclaimed cinematographer in film |
| Cillian Vallely | 1969 | | Traditional Irish Musician | Notable contributor to Irish traditional music |
| Joe Brolly | 1969 | | Athlete/Barrister | Gaelic footballer for Derry GAA and barrister |
| Niall Vallely | 1970 | | Traditional Irish Musician | Recognised traditional Irish musician |
| Oisín McConville | 1975 | | Athlete | Gaelic footballer for Armagh GAA |
| Cormac McAnallen | 1980 | 2004 | Athlete | Gaelic footballer for Tyrone GAA |
| Rónán Clarke | 1982 | | Athlete | Gaelic footballer for Armagh GAA |
| Seán Cavanagh | 1983 | | Athlete | Gaelic footballer for Tyrone GAA |
| Colm Cavanagh | 1986 | | Athlete | Gaelic footballer for Tyrone GAA |
| Charlie Vernon | 1987 | | Athlete | Gaelic footballer for Armagh GAA |
| Conor McKenna | 1996 | | Athlete | Gaelic footballer for Tyrone GAA (All‑Ireland Finalist); former Australian rules footballer for Essendon |
