= 1991 Hogan Cup =

- Dates: 20 April – 28 April 1991
- Teams: 4
- Champions: St Fachtna's DLS College (1st title); Kevin O'Dwyer (captain)
- Runners-up: St Patrick's Classical School

Tournament statistics
- Matches played: 3
- Goals scored: 7 (2.33 per match)
- Points scored: 57 (19 per match)

The 1991 Hogan Cup was the 38th staging of the Hogan Cup since its establishment by the Gaelic Athletic Association in 1946. The competition ran from 20 April to 28 April 1991.

St Patrick's College were the defending champions, however, they were beaten in the MacRory Cup.

The final was played on 28 April 1991 at Croke Park in Dublin, between St Fachtna's De La Salle College and St Patrick's Classical School, in what was their first ever meeting in the final. St Fachtna's De La Salle College won the match by 2–09 to 0–07 to claim their first ever Hogan Cup title.

== Qualification ==
Province	Champions
Connacht	St Mary's College
Leinster	St Patrick's Classical School
Munster	St Fachtna's De La Salle College
Ulster	St Patrick's Academy

== Results ==
=== Semi-finals ===
20 April 1991 Semi-final	St Patrick's Classical School	1-14 - 2-09	St Mary's College	Páirc Chiaráin

21 April 1991 Semi-final	St Fachtna's De La Salle College	1-11 - 1-07	St Patrick's Academy	O'Connor Park

=== Final ===
28 April 1991 Final	St Fachtna's De La Salle College	2-09 - 0-07	St Patrick's Classical School	Croke Park
