= Brian Collins (Gaelic footballer) =

Irish sportsperson

Personal information
- Native name: Brian Ó Coileáin (Irish)
- Born: 1974 (age 51–52) Castlehaven; County Cork, Ireland
- Occupation: Accountant

Sport
- Sport: Gaelic football
- Position: Centre-back
Club
- Years: Club
- Castlehaven
Club titles
- Cork titles: 2
- Munster titles: 2
- All-Ireland Titles: 0
College
- Years: College
- Cork RTC
College titles
- Sigerson titles: 0
Inter-county
Years	County	Apps (scores)
1994-1998	Cork	2 (0-00)
Inter-county titles
- Munster titles: 0
- All-Irelands: 0
- NFL: 0
- All Stars: 0

Brian Collins (born 1974) is an Irish retired Gaelic footballer. At club level, he played with Castlehaven and was also a member of the Cork senior football team.

== Playing career ==
Collins played Gaelic football at all levels as a student at St Fachtna's De La Salle College in Skibbereen. He won back-to-back Corn Uí Mhuirí medals in 1990 and 1991, before converting the latter win into a Hogan Cup medal after a 2-09 to 0-07 win over St Patrick's Classical School in the 1991 All-Ireland colleges final. Collins also lined out with Cork RTC in the Sigerson Cup.

At club level, Collins first played Gaelic football with the Castlehaven club at juvenile and underage levels, before progressing to adult level. He won his first Cork SFC medal in 1994, after a two-point win over O'Donovan Rossa in a final replay. Collins added Munster Club SFC medal to his collection in 1994 and 1997. He ended his club career with a second Cork SFC medal after a 1-09 to 1–07 win over Clonakilty in 2003.

At inter-county level, Collins first appeared for Cork as a substitute on the minor team that won the Munster MFC title in 1992. He later progressed to the under-21 team and added an All-Ireland U21FC medal to his collection when he was an unused substitute in the defeat of Mayo in the 1994 All-Ireland under-21 final.

Collins joined the senior team for a tournament game in 1994 and later lined out in the National Football League. He made his championship debut in 1996. A series of injuries, including a cruciate ligament injury, hastened the end of his inter-county career.

== Coaching career ==
Collins became involved in team management and coaching following his retirement from playing. He was a selector with the Castlehaven team that won the Cork SFC title in 2012.

== Honours ==
=== Player ===
St Fachtna's De La Salle College

- Hogan Cup: 1991
- Corn Uí Mhuirí: 1991

Castlehaven

- Munster Senior Club Football Championship: 1994, 1997
- Cork Senior Football Championship: 1994, 2003

Cork

- All-Ireland Under-21 Football Championship: 1994
- Munster Under-21 Football Championship: 1994
- Munster Minor Football Championship: 1992

=== Management ===
Castlehaven

- Cork Senior Football Championship: 2012
