= Dermot Carlin =

Irish Gaelic footballer

Personal information
- Born: 11 April 1984 (age 42) County Tyrone
- Height: 1.78 m (5 ft 10 in)

Sport
- Sport: Gaelic football
- Position: Corner Back
Club
- Years: Club
- Killyclogher St Mary's
Inter-county
Years	County	Apps (scores)
2003-2015	Tyrone	1 Scope Cup Winner
Inter-county titles
- Ulster titles: 1
- All-Irelands: 2
- NFL: 1

Dermot Carlin is a Gaelic footballer for the Killyclogher St Mary's club and the Tyrone county team. He was a member of the squad that won the county's first All-Ireland Senior Football Championship in 2003. In the same year he was part of the Killyclogher team which captured the Tyrone Senior Football Championship for the first time. Carlin was also part of Tyrone's 2001 All-Ireland Minor Championship winning team.

Carlin returned to Tyrone’s first-team line-up in 2007.

He also has a very rich past in underage football, having represented Omagh CBS in the MacRory Cup, reaching the final two years in a row, Dermot was the captain sharing the trophy in 2001, due to the onset of foot-and-mouth disease. Carlin represented the University of Ulster when he was a student there.
