= Fabian Monds =

Northern Irish broadcasting executive (1940–2025)

Fabian Charles Monds, CBE (1 November 1940 – 13 November 2025), was a Northern Irish broadcasting executive who was a BBC Governor, with responsibility for Northern Ireland.

== Life and career ==
Born in Omagh in County Tyrone, Monds was educated at the Christian Brothers Grammar School, Omagh and then at Queen's University of Belfast, with a BSc in electronics in 1962 and a PhD in communications in 1965.

Monds was Chair of the Young Enterprise Northern Ireland board from 1992 to 1995, and a member of the Board of Young Enterprise.

Appointed to the BBC board in 1999, in June 2003 his term of office was extended until 31 July 2007. He has contributed to economic development and inward investment initiatives, particularly in Derry, County Fermanagh, Omagh and West Belfast.

Monds was director of the Institute of Mathematics, becoming Dean, and later, Pro-Vice Chancellor, of the Magee Campus of the University of Ulster. Until 2006, he was the Chairman of Invest Northern Ireland, the region's main economic development organisation. His research interests included telecommunications and entrepreneurial studies. He was Chair of Northern Ireland's Centre for Trauma and Transformation in Omagh, County Tyrone. He was the former Northern Ireland co-chair of the U.S.-Ireland R&D Partnership Steering Group.

His granddaughter is the singer SOAK whose full name is Bridie Monds-Watson.

Monds died on 13 November 2025, at the age of 85.

== Positions ==
- Emeritus Professor of Information Systems of University of Ulster.
- Founding partner of Medical and Scientific Computer Services Ltd., Lisburn
- Founding partner of WesternConnect Ltd., Derry
