= Denis Faul =

Irish Catholic priest (1932–2006)

Monsignor Denis Faul

Personal life
- Born: Denis O'Beirne Faul; 14 August 1932 Louth, County Louth, Ireland
- Died: 21 June 2006 (aged 73) Dublin, Ireland
- Education: St. Patrick's Grammar School, Armagh
- Known for: Publicising Troubles-era security force abuses; supporting families in the 1981 Hunger Strike.
- Occupation: Priest, investigative author

Religious life
- Religion: Roman Catholic
- Ordination: 1956

Denis O'Beirne Faul (14 August 1932 – 21 June 2006) was an Irish Roman Catholic priest best known, in the course of the Northern Ireland Troubles, for publicising security-force abuses and, controversially among Irish republicans, for his role, with the families of prisoners, in bringing to an end the 1981 Irish hunger strike. In 1995, his church awarded him the honorific title of Monsignor.

== Early years ==
Born on 14 August 1932 in the village of Louth, County Louth, he was the son of Joseph and Anne Frances Faul. He was educated at St. Patrick's Grammar School, Armagh, and thereafter studied for the priesthood at St Patrick's College, Maynooth (where he recalled not being allowed to ask questions: "everything was very straightforward"). He was ordained in 1956. After a year studying theology in Rome, he joined the staff of St Patrick's Academy, Dungannon, County Tyrone, to teach Latin and religion. He was appointed principal in 1983.

== Civil rights and the Troubles ==
As a schoolteacher of young Catholics ill-treated by the Royal Ulster Constabulary (RUC), Faul became involved in the early Northern Ireland civil rights movement, and in 1968 participated in its marches. With onset of the Troubles, he protested vigorously against rights violations by the RUC and, after they were deployed in August 1969 on the streets, by the British Army. He was also to protest the impunity seemingly enjoyed by loyalist-paramilitary death squads. For his criticism of the security forces and of the judiciary, Faul was publicly rebuked by Cardinal William Conway concerned lest the church be seen as aligned with republicans.

From the introduction of internment without trial (Operation Demetrius) in 1971 to late 1980s, Faul produced in excess of 150 leaflets and pamphlets detailing security force abuses and calling for reform. Most of these were in collaboration with Fr Raymond Murray, prison Chaplain in the women's prison at Armagh. In 1974, in submissions to the Lord Gardiner inquiry into the human-rights context of "counter-terrorism" measures, the two priests documented the use of a wide variety of torture techniques in the interrogation and treatment of IRA suspects. When riots broke out at Long Kesh, Faul and Murray circulated The Flames of Long Kesh (1974) to explain and present the prisoners grievances. This they followed up with The RUC:The Black and Blue Book (1975), an indictment of police abuses and of selective justice.

In Triangle of Death (1975) Faul and Murray highlighted the possibility of security-force collusion in a spate of killings by the loyalist Glenanne gang of Catholics in the countryside between Portadown, Dungannon and Armagh. They repeatedly raised their concerns with the British and Irish governments.

Beginning in 1976, before their causes became well-known, Faul and Murray campaigned for the release of the Birmingham Six and the Guildford Four and Maguire Seven. In 1982, they highlighted the lethal use of purportedly crowd-control plastic bullets. Those stung by Faul's accusations viewed him as a "Provo priest".

== Limited criticism of the Church ==
Faul was not uncritical of his church's response to the Troubles. In failing to "understand the suffering of his own people", he suggested that William Philbin, Bishop of Down and Conor, had conceded leadership to the Provisional Irish Republican Army(described by the bishop as being "of the devil". Among his fellow priests, Faul was not alone: in West Belfast Fr Des Wilson suggested that had the hierarchy "given the same measure of recognition and protection and a sense of dignity to those people as the small guerrilla groups have given them, then they would have as much loyalty". Fr Pat Buckley proposed that had Philbin, in 1969, "led two hundred thousand people up the Falls Road demanding civil rights, the Provos might not have been necessary".

But Faul was not set on the same paths of radical dissent: in what Philbin took as an act of defiance, Wilson resigned his parish duties in 1975, and Buckley's defiance was such that he was suspended from the priesthood in 1986 and excommunicated in 2016. On many of the issues that exercised the Church in the decades following Vatican II, Faul was orthodox and conservative. In contrast to Wilson, he defended the priestly rule of celibacy and Church control of schools ("people accuse us of being in the business of brainwashing children. Well, I make no bones about it – we are"). He also opposed divorce, abortion and contraception.

Critically, and again in contrast to Wilson (embraced by the Provisionals as a "priest of the people"), Faul joined his bishops in morally condemning republican campaigns of targeted killings and bombing.

Of himself, Faul said:

I want to see Ireland united but I am not going to kill anybody for it. I am not an IRA man. I am a real republican. I love the British people but they have no business in my country.

== 1981 hunger strike ==
In 1981, as a visiting priest assisting the formally appointed chaplain in the Maze Prison Faul was seen to play a critical role in ending a republican hunger strike. Faul had understanding for Bobby Sands and those of his fellow republican prisoners who joined him in refusing food.

They came from a very oppressed class of people who suffered ferocious discrimination, and the burning our in the Falls Road in August '69 was a very big thing with them ... They felt that their people were defenceless and they had to do something about it. .... There was internment first of all, ill-treatment, torture, sensory deprivation techniques ... and that didn't end until '79. They felt they were representing their people in all of that.

With a sense of that "these men were beating us at our own game", as a priest he also appreciated, within a faith that worshipped a "crucified criminal" and gloried in the "passions of the martyrs", the emotive power of the prisoners decision to starve themselves.

After some hesitation, Faul concluded that the hunger strike was not "a valid political protest". It was not a negotiating lever to win the restoration of Special Category Status for republican prisoners. Rather, for the Provisional leadership, it was "about drawing attention to death and big funerals" in the hope of maximising Sinn Féin's electoral gains.

Persuaded that a previous hunger strike had been 24 – 48 hours from a British capitulation, Sands, had been "conned by his own crowd". After he and three other men had died in May 1981, and the "Brits" had conceded to one of the demands, that in recognition of their special status republican prisoners be allowed to wear their own clothes, Faul regarded Sinn Féin as being "gravely at fault":

They were having a good time, Sinn Féin. The money was rolling in, political support was building up. They were getting members elected to the Dáil. They had the big funeral for Sands. They were having a great time politically. They could feel it building up and they had a by-election coming up in Fermanagh/South Tyrone, They wouldn't stop it.

In Paris at the beginning of July, Faul, together with Kieran Doherty's mother Margaret, tried to persuade the French government to intervene and pressure the British to make concessions. Following the death of fifth striker, Joe McDonnell, on July 8, Faul returned to Ireland and organised a meeting of prisoners' relatives. He argued that Prime Minister Margaret Thatcher had shown she would not be moved, and the families agreed with Faul to meet with Gerry Adams in the hope of finding a way to end the protest. Adams, however, was to report that the remaining strikers rejected the terms on offer from the British government as a betrayal of those who had already sacrificed their lives. After four further deaths, Faul persuaded the next of kin to take their men off the strike when they became unconscious. By 6 September, six men had been moved to the hospital wings where they could be fed, and the four final holdouts agreed to end their protest on 3 October.

In 1993, Faul described his role in the hunger strikes for a BBC "Timewatch" documentary.

== At odds with republican and nationalist leadership ==
Faul's intervention was not appreciated by many who had supported the hunger strikers. Some republican prisoners refused to take communion from "Thatcher's priest", and a statement issued in September in their name denounced Faul as a "treacherous, conniving man". Faul widened the breach by describing the Provisional IRA as a "murder gang" and Provisional republicanism as having the "smell of fascism".

Speaking after Faul's death in June 2006, Gerry Adams suggested that Faul's problem with the Provisional movement was that he resented the loss of the Church's 's paternalist control of the north's working-class Catholics. Faul had preferred it "when we were all wee Catholic boys and girls being tortured and beaten up and hadn't any great political thoughts of our own". In its first extended obituary, this broadly was the position of An Phoblacht: Faul realised that "the nationalist community had others who would speak on its behalf" and that "the Church was being pushed aside".

Faul had also been critical of the Social Democratic and Labour Party, the party that, in the wake of the hunger strike, Sinn Féin was to progressively displace as the voice of northern nationalism. He dismissed the coalition of civil-rights leaders and NI Labour Party veterans as "liberal upstarts", and had opposed their participation in the first Northern Ireland power-sharing executive (1973–74) led by Brian Faulkner, the former Prime Minister of Northern Ireland who had introduced internment.

What Faul did endorse was the 1985 Anglo-Irish Agreement. In the government of Northern Ireland, this gave the Republic of Ireland an advisory role (complete with its own Belfast secretariat). He was initially sceptical of the peace process that, following talks between Adams and SDLP leader John Hume, developed in the 1990s. He doubted the bona fides of Sinn Féin and the IRA, and feared the Anglo-Irish Agreement would be sacrificed.

== Political argument for prisoner release ==
Interviewed in 1988, Faul argued that the British Government were "very silly" not to recognise that large numbers of republican prisoners are "rebelling against the Provos" and "just want out".

[T]he fellows who more or less in the early 70s--as a reaction to the ghetto pogrom of '69--entered the Provos to defend the Catholic Community, they are disgusted by the present civilian killings and the random shootings and the racketeering, the extortion, the forcible taking over of pubs and all.

Their release would promote more "independent" thinking, and deprive the Provisionals of their key political asset, the families Once their loved ones are released, the families of prisoners tended to "just disappear" back into the community. "The Provos", Faul argued, operated "on a very narrow basis of support.

== Last years ==
Faul was honoured by the church with the title Monsignor in 1995. Following his retirement from teaching in 1998 he became Parish Priest of neighbouring Termonmaguirc (Carrickmore). Faul died of cancer in Dublin on 21 June 2006, aged 73. Former hunger strikers and prisoners, Republicans and senior members of Sinn Féin attended the large funeral at St. Colmcille's Church, Carrickmore, many having come to respect the work carried out by Faul over his lifetime.

== Publications ==
- The Flames of Long Kesh by Denis Faul and Raymond Murray (1974)
- The RUC: The Black and Blue Book by Denis Faul and Raymond Murray (1975)
- The Triangle of Death: Sectarian Assassinations in the Dungannon-Moy-Portadown Area by Denis Faul and Raymond Murray (1975)
- The Birmingham Framework: Six Innocent Men Framed for the Birmingham Bombings (1976).
- H Blocks: British Jail for Irish Political Prisoners by Denis Faul and Raymond Murray (1979)
- The British Dimension: Brutality, Murder and Legal Duplicity in N. Ireland by Denis Faul and Raymond Murray (1980)
- Plastic Bullets - Plastic Government: Deaths and Injuries by Plastic Bullets, August 1981-October 1982 by Denis Faul and Raymond Murray (1982)
- The Hooded Men: British Torture in Ireland, August, October 1971 by Denis Faul and Raymond Murray, Wordwell (2017)
