= Sheree Atcheson =

Sri Lankan-born Irish computer scientist

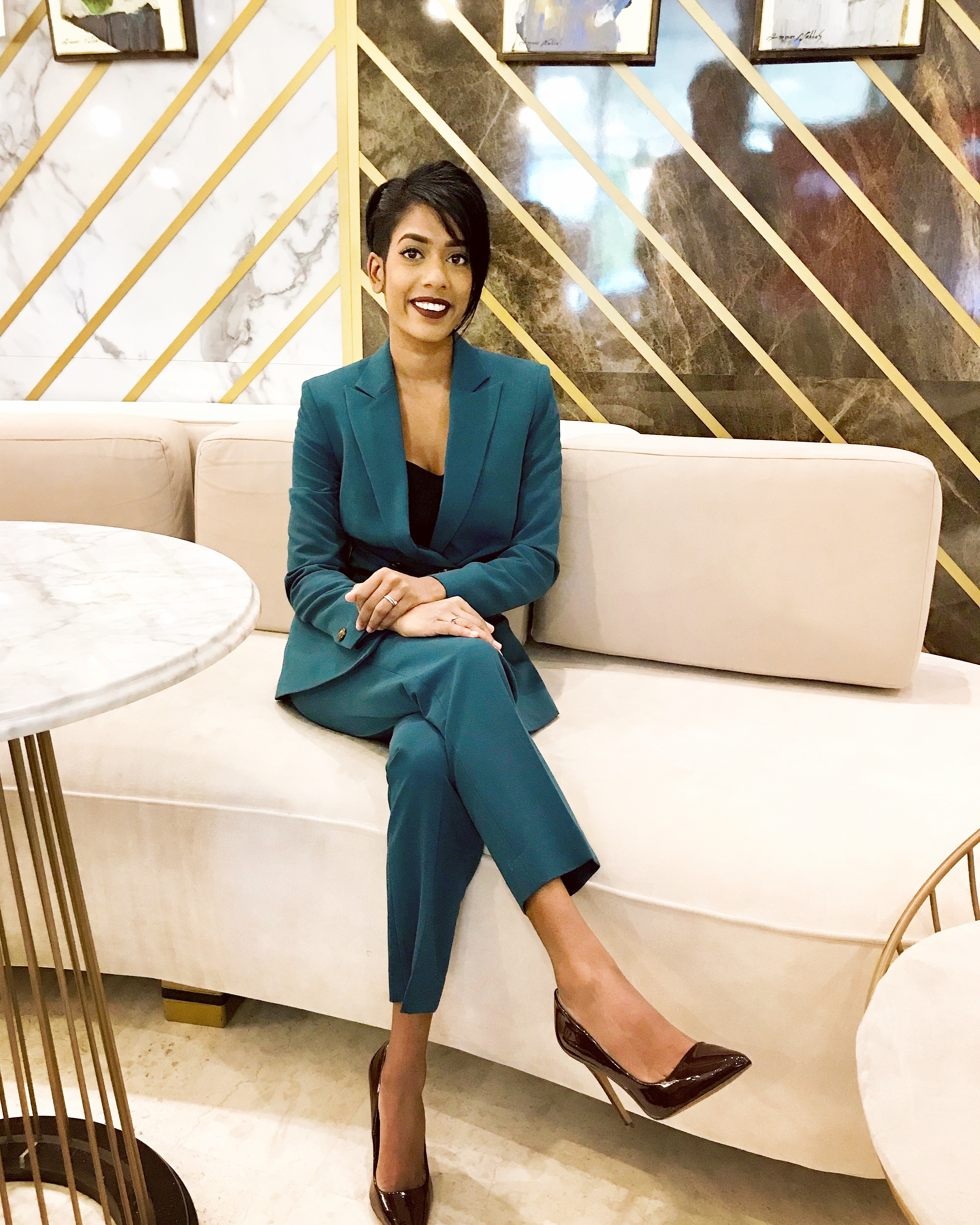
- Born: 28 February 1991 (age 35); Sri Lanka
- Education: Queen's University Belfast
- Employer(s): Valtech; Peakon; Monzo; Deloitte
- Organization: Women Who Code
- Spouse: Sean McCrory

Sheree Atcheson (born 28 February 1991) is a Sri Lankan-born Northern Irish computer scientist and Group Vice-President of Diversity & Inclusion at Valtech. She previously has held roles such as Global Director of Diversity, Equity and Inclusion at Peakon, Head of Diversity and Inclusion at Monzo and Consulting Inclusion Lead at Deloitte. Atcheson has been recognised by Computer Weekly as one of the Most Influential Women in UK Tech. She was the Global Ambassador for Women Who Code.

== Early life and education ==
Atcheson was born in Sri Lanka. At three weeks old, Atcheson was adopted by a Roman Catholic family in County Tyrone Northern Ireland United Kingdom, where she attended St Patrick's Academy, Dungannon.

As a child she played computer games with her brother and she decided that she wanted to pursue a career in technology. Her first job was working at the counter at her local pharmacy. She decided to study computer science at Queen's University Belfast. As an undergraduate student, only one in ten of her classmates were women, and Atcheson has worked since then to address this imbalance.

== Career ==
After graduating, Atcheson joined Kainos as a software engineer before joining SR Laboratories. In 2016 Atcheson joined Deloitte, where she worked as a business consultant for strategy and architecture. She was eventually promoted lead for inclusion, and helped to design and implement the Deloitte Inclusion Strategy. At Deloitte, Atcheson developed and led the Consulting practice Inclusion strategy. In 2019 she was appointed Head of Diversity and Inclusion at Monzo. and left this role in June 2020. In August 2020, she was appointed as Global Director of Diversity, Equity and Inclusion at Peakon. She has written for Forbes and The Guardian. and been featured in the Evening Standard, BBC Make It Super Assembly and Positive News.

=== Advocacy ===
Atcheson was involved with establishing United Kingdom expansion of Women Who Code. Since launching in 2013, Atcheson has taken their membership to over 8,000 members, over 1,000 of which belong to the Belfast branch. She serves as their Global Ambassador. Women Who Code ceased trading in 2024.

Atcheson established "I am Lanka", a project set up to champion role models from Sri Lanka. "I am Lanka" began when Atcheson was searching for her birth mother, receiving thousands of messages from Sri Lankan people revealing that she had inspired them to share their stories. She delivered a keynote lecture at the 2018 InspireFest.

=== Awards and honours ===
Atcheson was selected by Computer Weekly as one of the Most Influential Women in UK tech. She was selected by WeAreTheCity as one of the United Kingdom's Rising Stars. In 2019 she was awarded Queen's University Belfast Graduate of the Year. and was listed as one of the Financial Times Top 100 BAME Leaders influencing the Tech sector. Whilst at Deloitte, she won the Women in Tech Employer of the Year Award in the Women in Tech Employer Awards 2019.

== Personal life ==
Atcheson was married to Sean McCrory on 4 June 2017.
