= James Kelly (historian) =

Irish historian (born 1959)

Professor James Kelly MRIA
- Born: 1959 (age 66–67)
- Occupations: author and professor

Academic work
- Doctoral students: Chris Lawlor

James Kelly MRIA (born 1959) is a professor of Irish history, specialising in the period 1700–1850, and is a prolific author, who also edits several learned journals.

Kelly was a professor at St Patrick's College, Drumcondra, Dublin, and is now a professor at Dublin City University, into which the college merged. He also edits for the Irish Manuscripts Commission and for the Proceedings of the Royal Irish Academy.

== Bibliography ==
as author, co-author or principal editor:

- Henry Flood Patriots and politics in eighteenth-century Ireland; Four Courts Press, Dublin, 1998.
- History of the Catholic Diocese of Dublin; ed. with Dáire Keogh; Four Courts Press, 2000.
- Gallows speeches from eighteenth-century Ireland; Four Courts, 2001.
- Childhood and its discontents : the first Seamus Heaney lectures; ed. Joseph Dunne and James Kelly; foreword by Seamus Heaney. Liffey Press, 2003.
- The Irish Act of Union, 1800 : bicentennial essays; with Brown, Michael & Geoghegan, Patrick M.; Irish Academic Press, 2003.
- Sir Edward Newenham, MP, 1734–1814 Defender of the Protestant constitution; Four Courts Press, 2003.
- The Liberty and Ormond Boys : factional riots in eighteenth-century Dublin; Four Courts, 2005.
- St Patrick's College, Drumcondra, 1875–2000 A history; Four Courts, 2006. (as editor)
- Poynings' Law and the Making of Law in Ireland 1660–1800 : Monitoring the Constitution; Four Courts Press in association with the Irish Legal History Society, 2007.
- The Irish House of Lords; 1771–1800 in 3 vols., Irish Manuscripts Commission 2008.
- Sir Richard Musgrave, 1746–1818 Ultra-protestant ideologue; Four Courts, 2009.
- People, Politics and Power – Irish History from 1660–1850; as co-editor, University College Dublin Press, 2009.
- Clubs and societies in eighteenth-century Ireland; ed. with Martyn J. Powell; Four Courts, 2010.
- Sport in Ireland,1600-1840; Four Courts, 2014.
- Food Rioting in Ireland in the Eighteenth and Nineteenth Centuries; Four Courts, 2017.

== See also ==
- List of Irish learned societies
- Ireland 1691–1801
- Ireland 1801–1923
