= Chris Lawlor =

Irish historian (born 1960)

- Born: Christopher Lawlor; 1971 (age 54–55); London, England
- Occupations: schoolteacher and historian
- Spouse: Margaret Mooney (m. 1985)
- Children: 3

Academic background
- Thesis: The establishment and evolution of an Irish village: the case of Dunlavin, county Wicklow 1600-1910 (2010)
- Doctoral advisor: James Kelly

Christopher Lawlor (born 1960) is an Irish historian and writer, known for his work on the history of West Wicklow.

== Early life and education ==
Born in London in 1960, Lawlor moved to his father's home village of Dunlavin, County Wicklow before his first birthday. His interest in history was sparked during his early education at Dunlavin National School, particularly under the encouragement of schoolteacher Tom O'Neill, who incorporated local history into the parish's primary-school curriculum.

Lawlor received his secondary education at Naas C.B.S. before going on to study at NUI Maynooth, where he obtained his Bachelor of Arts degree in 1981. He later earned a master's degree in local history at Maynooth in 1999, his thesis focusing on Canon Frederick Donovan, a 19th-century parish priest in Dunlavin. He completed his PhD under the supervision of Prof. James Kelly at St Patrick's College, DCU in 2010, examining the history of Dunlavin from 1600 to shortly before World War I.

== Career ==
Lawlor began teaching history at Méanscoil Iognáid Rís (Naas C.B.S.) in 1983, and he spent most of his professional career there, eventually becoming head of the History Department. He retired from teaching in 2017 but remains active in historical research and writing.

Lawlor is actively involved in West Wicklow Historical Society, having served as the society's vice-chairperson from 2017 to 2021, chairperson in 2022 and treasurer from 2023 to 2026. He has also co-edited the biennial Journal of the West Wicklow Historical Society since the journal's revival in 2007. The most recent journal WWHS journal, number thirteen, was launched in Hollywood in 2025.

Lawlor has also been involved with the Dunlavin Writers' Group and has written fiction alongside his historical works.

Lawlor has won multiple awards for both short story writing and for historical research, including the Dunlavin Festival of Arts Short Story Award in 2001, the Lord Walter Fitzgerald Prize for Original Historical Research in 2003, the Irish Chiefs’ Prize for History in 2013 and Ireland's Own Short Story Competition in 2018.

== Personal life ==
Lawlor married Margaret Mooney from Eadestown in 1985; they live in Dunlavin. The couple have three sons: Declan (Dunlavin), Jason (Ballinakill), and Michael (Portlaoise).

Lawlor has claimed to have 1,150 history books in his personal library.

== Publications ==
=== Books ===
- The massacre on Dunlavin green: a story of the 1798 rebellion (Naas, 1998); ISBN 978-0953294701.
- Canon Frederick Donovan's Dunlavin 1884-1896: A West Wicklow village in the late nineteenth century (Dublin, 2000); ISBN 978-0716527244.
- From the Norman moat to the Spanish field: a history of Naas Christian Brothers' School (Naas, 2002); ISBN 978-0953294718.
- In search of Michael Dwyer (Naas, 2003); ISBN 978-0953294725.
- The longest rebellion: the Dunlavin Massacre and Michael Dwyer and West Wicklow, 1797-1803 (Dublin, 2007); ISBN 978-0955463426.
- An Irish village: Dunlavin, County Wicklow (Naas, 2011); ISBN 978-0953294732.
- The little book of Wicklow (Dublin, 2014); ISBN 978-0750998840.
- The little book of Kildare (Dublin, 2015); ISBN 978-1803997032.
- With much quiet fervour: a brief history of Dunlavin Roman Catholic parish and St Nicholas of Myra church (Naas, 2018); ISBN 978-0953294756.
- Dunlavin Diversions (Naas, 2020); ISBN 978-0953294763.
- A revolutionary village: Dunlavin, Co. Wicklow c.1900-1925 (Naas, 2021); ISBN 978-0953294770.
- Robert Barton: a remarkable revolutionary (Cheltenham, 2024); ISBN 978-1803998169.
- The little history of Wicklow (Cheltenham, 2026); ISBN 978-1837050970.

=== Theses ===
- 'The making of a local landscape: Dunlavin D.E.D.' (B.A. thesis, N.U.I. Maynooth, 1981).
- 'The Wicklow world of Canon F. A. Donovan' (M.A. thesis, N.U.I. Maynooth, 1999).
- 'The establishment and evolution of an Irish village: the case of Dunlavin, county Wicklow 1600-1910' (Ph.D. thesis, St Patrick's College D.C.U., 2010), vol. 1 and vol. 2.

=== Chapters ===
- 'Handball in Dunlavin' in Jimmy Whittle (ed.), 'Sons of Saint Nicholas': a history of Dunlavin G.A.A. club (Naas, 1984), pp 122-4.
- 'John O'Brien: the early years' in Chris Lawlor and Donal McDonnell (eds), General O'Brien: West Wicklow to South America (Naas, 2006), pp 7-15.
- 'The final frontier: the Dunlavin area in west Wicklow c.1200 - 1600 - a regional case study of Anglo-Irish relations over the longue durée' in Katharine Simms (ed.), Gaelic Ireland (c.600–c.1700): politics, culture and landscapes. Studies for the 'Irish Chiefs' Prize (Dublin, 2013), pp 11-6.
- 'The origin of the place-name "Dunlavin", County Wicklow' in Katharine Simms (ed.), Gaelic Ireland (c.600–c.1700): politics, culture and landscapes. Studies for the 'Irish Chiefs' Prize (Dublin, 2013), pp 123-9.
- 'Burning their bridges: the opposition of the Gabhal Raghnaill and Feagh Mac Hugh O’Byrne to the process of Anglicisation during the long sixteenth century' in Joseph Mannion and Katharine Simms (eds), Politics, kinship and culture in Gaelic Ireland, c.1100–c.1690. Essays for the Irish Chiefs' and Clans' Prize in History (Dublin, 2018), pp 24-32.
- 'The War of Independence in and around Dunlavin. January 1919 to June 1920' in Ciarán Deane (ed.), Wicklow and the War of Independence (Wicklow, 2021), pp 97-106.
- 'The War of Independence in and around Dunlavin. July 1920 to July 1921' in Ciarán Deane (ed.), Wicklow and the War of Independence (Wicklow, 2021), pp 107-14.
- 'The "Dunlavin tragedy": Murder, suicide and the execution of William Mitchell in 1921' in Ciarán Deane (ed.), Wicklow and the War of Independence (Wicklow, 2021), pp 115-22.
- 'Robert Barton: Wicklow revolutionary and statesman' in Ciarán Deane (ed.), Wicklow and the War of Independence (Wicklow, 2021), pp 203-10.
- 'Divided by a common religion: ecclesiastical identity and the creation of a "savage other" in medieval Dublin and Wicklow' in Luke McInerney and Katharine Simms (eds), Gaelic Ireland (c.600–c.1700): lordship, saints and learning. Essays for the Irish Chiefs' and Clans' Prize in History (Dublin, 2021), pp 25-31.

=== Journal articles ===
- 'Sir Richard Bulkeley and the foundation of Dunlavin village' in Journal of the County Kildare Archaeological Society, 19/2 (2003), pp 257-68.
- 'Ancient anarchy and medieval mayhem - around Dunlavin?' in Journal of the County Kildare Archaeological Society, 19/3 (2004), pp 384-405.
- 'The university of Dunlavin' in Journal of the County Kildare Archaeological Society, 19/3 (2004), pp 559-62.
- 'West Wicklow and the 1641 rebellion' in Journal of the West Wicklow Historical Society, no. 4 (2007), pp 18-26.
- 'A brief statistical analysis of Dunlavin Roman Catholic parish from 1891 to 1902' in Journal of the West Wicklow Historical Society, no. 4 (2007), pp 48-54.
- 'A Bulkeley village: Dunlavin, County Wicklow' in Journal of the Federation of Local History Societies, vol. 14 (2008), pp 20-31.
- 'Tithe, protest and criminality around Dunlavin 1823-1845' in Journal of the West Wicklow Historical Society, no. 5 (2009), pp 28-49.
- 'The development and present state of local Irish historiography' in Journal of the West Wicklow Historical Society, no. 5 (2009), pp 95-102.
- 'St. Nicholas’s holy well, Tournant, Dunlavin' in Journal of the West Wicklow Historical Society, no. 6 (2011), pp 88-99.
- 'Contextualising a chieftain’s career: the case of Feagh Mac Hugh O’Byrne' in Journal of the West Wicklow Historical Society, no. 7 (2013), pp 25-51.
- 'The Dunlavin massacre: two ballads of 1798' in Journal of the West Wicklow Historical Society, no. 8 (2015), pp 140-8.
- 'Raids, requisitions and recompense: the Civil War’s impact on West Wicklow, 1922-3' in Journal of the West Wicklow Historical Society, no. 9 (2017), pp 133-52.
- 'Baltinglass Bridewell and Courthouse: part 1' in Journal of the West Wicklow Historical Society, no. 10 (2019), pp 286-310.
- 'Baltinglass Bridewell and Courthouse: part 2' in Journal of the West Wicklow Historical Society, no. 11 (2021), pp 151-68.
- 'Revisiting the 1798 Dunlavin massacre for its 225th anniversary' in Journal of the West Wicklow Historical Society, no. 12 (2023), pp 103-24.
- '"We’re true United Irishmen: we’ll fight until we die": a bicentennial evaluation of Michael Dwyer’s guerilla campaign in the Wicklow Mountains and its legacy' in Journal of the West Wicklow Historical Society, no. 13 (2025), pp 155-79.
- 'Michael Dwyer - a bicentennial assessment of the life and legacy of the "Wicklow Chief"' in Journal of the Federation of Local History Societies, vol. 30 (2025), pp 37-47.

=== Magazine and brochure articles ===
- 'Dunlavin in 1798' in Dunlavin Festival of Arts Brochure, x (Naas, 1992), pp 53-9.
- 'Dunlavin — foundation, famine and beyond' in Dunlavin Festival of Arts Brochure, xi (Naas, 1993), pp 19-26.
- 'Borderland: the Dunlavin area, cockpit of wars: a violent trilogy' in Dunlavin Festival of Arts Brochure, xiii (Naas, 1995), pp 17-29.
- 'Dunlavin — what’s in a name?' in Dunlavin-Donard-Davidstown Parish Link, i, nos 2, 3 and 5 (1995), pp 6, 4 and 5.
- 'A pattern in time' in Dunlavin Festival of Arts Brochure, xiv (Naas, 1996), pp 50-3.
- 'Townland ghosts and some reflections' in Dunlavin-Donard-Davidstown Parish Link, iii, no. 5 and iv, no. 1 (Naas, 1997 and 1998), pp 3, 6-9.
- 'From Wicklow to Woomera — Wicklow’s criminal Australian connections' in Dunlavin Festival of Arts Brochure, xvi (Naas, 1998), pp 21-4.
- ‘Dunlavin green revisited’ in Dunlavin-Donard-Davidstown Parish Link, iv, no. 3 (Naas, November 1998), pp 6-7.
- 'Dean Swift of St Patrick’s — and Dunlavin' in Dunlavin Festival of Arts Brochure, xviii (Naas, 2000), pp 7-8.
- 'Borderland: the Dunlavin area, cockpit of wars: a violent trilogy' in Dunlavin Festival of Arts Brochure, xiii (Naas, 2000), pp 17-29.
- 'Some Wicklow history — originally recorded' in Dunlavin Festival of Arts Brochure, xxi (Naas, 2003), pp 49-52.
- 'Saint Palladius and the Dunlavin area' in Dunlavin Festival of Arts Brochure, xxiv (Naas, 2006), pp 22-7.
- 'From a spark to a firebrand: Feagh Mac Hugh O'Byrne' in History Ireland, 21/5 (Sept./Oct. 2013), pp 20-3.

=== Books edited ===
- General O'Brien: West Wicklow to South America (Naas, 2006) [with Donal McDonnell].

=== Journals edited ===
- Journal of the West Wicklow Historical Society, no. 4 (2007) - no. 11 (2021) [with Donal McDonnell].
- Journal of the West Wicklow Historical Society, no. 12 (2023) - no. 13 (2025) [with Declan Keenan].
