= Iggy Jones =

Irish Gaelic footballer

Personal information
- Born: c. 1927 Dungannon, County Tyrone, Northern Ireland
- Died: 4 September 1992 (aged 65)
- Occupation: Schoolteacher
- Height: 5 ft 6 in (168 cm)

Sport
- Sport: Gaelic football
- Position: Forward
Club
- Years: Club
- ?-?: Dungannon Thomas Clarkes
Inter-county
- Years: County
- ?-?: Tyrone
Inter-county titles
- Ulster titles: 2
- All-Irelands: 0
- NFL: 0
- All Stars: n/a

Ignatius "Iggy" Jones (c. 1927 – 4 September 1992) was a Gaelic footballer who played for Tyrone football. He was part of the breakthrough Tyrone team that won back-to-back Ulster Championships in 1956 and 1957 – they had not won a championship prior to that. He also represented Ireland in an exhibition series versus the combined Universities.

His main asset was his ability to solo run at great length, before setting up a teammate, or scoring himself. Along with players such as Frankie Donnelly, he was one of the first generation of Tyrone players to make an impact on the All-Ireland stage.

He was listed by Eoghan Corry, in his book, The GAA Book of Lists, as one of eleven great players never to win an All-Ireland crown.

He first made his name as a schoolboy in the first ever Hogan Cup final – an unorthodox place for a player to cement a reputation. He was playing for St. Patrick's, Armagh, against St. Jarliath's, Tuam. His personal scoring tally was 3–4, out of Armagh's 3–12, inspiring them to a four-point victory.

His mark on the school's competition has been rewarded by having the MacRory Cup matches' Man of the Match award named after him.

A schoolteacher, he served as Headmaster of Presentation Brothers, Dungannon. The "Iggy Jones Room" at O'Neill Park, in Dungannon, is named in his honour.
