= St Mary's Grammar School =

St. Mary's Grammar School
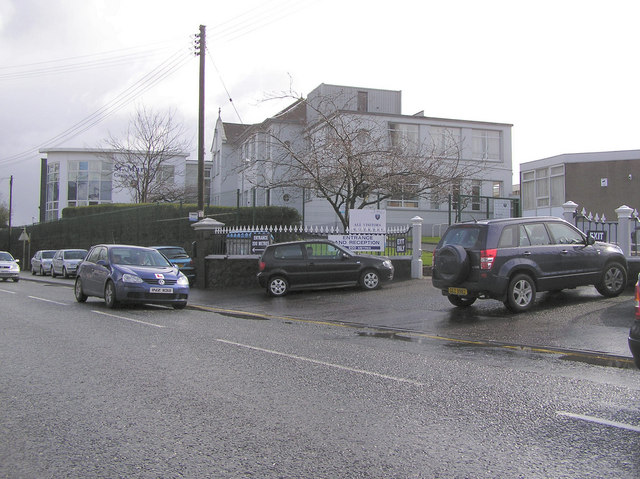

Location
- Magherafelt; Northern Ireland; 54.757°N 6.601°W

Information
- Type: Grammar School
- Motto: Gloria Deo Soli (Glory to God Alone)
- Religious affiliation: Roman Catholic
- Established: 1927
- Local authority: Education Authority (North Eastern)
- Principal: Paul McClean
- Gender: Coeducational
- Age: 11 to 18
- Enrolment: 1,099 (approx)
- Colours: Blue and White
- Website: stmarysmagherafelt.com

St. Mary's Grammar School is a grammar school in Magherafelt, County Londonderry, Northern Ireland.

== History ==
St. Mary's was founded in 1927 by the Sisters of the Holy Family of Bordeaux. Ten girls were enrolled in the first year under the principalship of Sister Tracey. The school grew throughout the 1940s under the principalship of Sister Marie Therese Harte. With the school's continued academic success, the need for more accommodation became urgent and in 1954 the first extension was built.

September 1978 marked a significant milestone in the history of the school: 37 boys were enrolled in St. Mary's along with 587 girls.

In 1984, new accommodation was again required. Under the leadership of the then principal Sister Immaculata O'Connor, the Friends of St. Mary's was formed with the purpose of raising funds to finance the building programme. The £6 million extension was formally opened by Cardinal Daly on 8 December 1994. It includes a large sports hall, fitness suite, science block, technology block, drama/lecture theatre, careers suite, Sixth Form study area and general purpose classrooms. Tennis courts, grass and all-weather pitches complement the indoor sports facilities. In 2003, the school trustees completed a further phase of the development programme when Cafe Bordeaux and a new classroom extension were opened.

Today, St. Mary's Grammar School has over eleven hundred pupils on roll, with an equal ratio of boys and girls and serves three counties: Londonderry, Antrim and Tyrone.

September 2004 marked another beginning in the school's history with the appointment of its first male Principal, Mr D A Lambon. In September 2011, Deirdre Gillespie was appointed principal.

In September 2022, Paul McClean was appointed new principal, taking over from acting principal Frank Dunlop, who filled in for Mrs Gillespie.

== Principals ==
No.	Name	Tenure
1	Sr. Cassian Tracey	1927–1928
2	Sr. Salomé Creagh	1928–1937
3	Sr. Philomena Cashin	1937–1945
4	Sr. Marie Thérése Harte	1945–1977
5	Sr. Immaculata O’Connor	1977–1995
6	Una O'Kane	1995–2004
7	David Lambon	2004–2011
8	Deirdre Gillespie	2011–2022
8	Paul McClean	2022–present

== Academics ==
St Mary's Grammar School has historically been placed among the top grammar schools in Northern Ireland in the Belfast Telegraph's League Table.

In 2012 it was ranked first in Northern Ireland for its A-Level performance with 95% of entrants being awarded three A*-C grades. This was followed by Lumen Christi College, Derry (92%).

In 2018 it was ranked joint 1st for its GCSE performance with 100% of its entrants receiving five or more GCSEs at grades A* to C, including the core subjects English and Maths.

In 2019 it was ranked 7th out of 159 secondary schools in its A-Level performance with 91.1% of its entrants in the 2017/18 exams being awarded three A*-C grades.

== Sports ==
The school is involved in many sporting activities including girls and boys football team, highly successful camogie teams. It achieved All-Ireland Camogie success in 2007.

On 17 March 2017 St Mary's won the MacRory Cup for the first time in their history beating St Colman's College, Newry on a score line of 0–19 to 0–13 in Athletic Grounds, Armagh. On 19 March 2018 St Mary's were defeated in the MacRory Cup by St Ronan's College Lurgan, 1-09 to 1–07. St Ronan's won the title for the first time in the school's history. St Ronan's will go on to represent Ulster in the Hogan Cup against the other respective provincial schools winners.

The school won a second Mac Rory cup in 2022, beating Holy Trinity Cookstown in the final on a score of 2-09 to 0-08.

In hurling, in 2023, they then clinched a Casement Cup, having lost the final the previous year, beating Rathmore at Corrigan Park, captain Luke Burns broke the trophey as he lifted it. They would lose the all-ireland final however to Mitchelstown.

== F1 in Schools ==
Team Hurricane from St Mary's Grammar School won the 11 – 14's National Finals in 2005. They then returned the following year and won the 11–14 age group and the overall winners trophy.

Two other separate teams, one being Team Blade, won the Northern Ireland championships in 2007, The other, Team F1 Falcon, won the national 16–18 age group in the same year.

== Societies ==
The Saint Mary's Geographic Society (Geography club) is currently run by geography teacher A. Stevenson with help from fellow teacher S. Rasdale and head of department U. McNeill. The club is for years 8–10 however senior students (years 11–14) are welcome to come to help the teachers with the organisation of the club and its many projects. French clubs, geography club, science club and many more.

Club Mhuire is the Irish Language Society. Organised by 6th form pupils, it provides opportunities for students to interact, and partake in activities, through the medium of Irish. They meet at lunch time each week, and activities include quizzes, bingo, and teaching students how to make St Brigid's Crosses (Crosóg Bríghde). There are also themed events at Halloween and Christmas. Student who excel in the various activities get to win prizes which are always linked to the Irish Language, such as Gael Linn or Foras na Gaeilge merchandise. It was founded in 2006 with the help of Dr. O'Neill and Miss Harte, two of the school's Irish teachers. It is now facilitated by Mr Mac Feilimí and Mrs MacTomais.

== Notable alumni ==
- Deirdre Madden (born 1960, writer
- Orla Chennaoui (born 1979) - journalist and TV presenter
- Jim Eastwood, one of the final four contestants in the 7th UK series of The Apprentice
- Emma Kearney (born 1981), Emmerdale and Coronation Street actress
- Elinor Lawless - actress
- Conor McCluskey - gaelic football player
- Eoin McEvoy - gaelic football player
