= Murder of Michaela McAreavey =

2011 crime in Mauritius

Coordinates: 20.002286°S 57.659607°E

Michaela McAreavey
- Born: Michaela Harte; 31 December 1983; Glencull, County Tyrone, Northern Ireland
- Died: 10 January 2011 (aged 27); Grand Gaube, Rivière du Rempart District, Mauritius
- Cause of death: Strangulation
- Education: St Mary's University College, Belfast; Queen's University Belfast
- Occupation: Teacher
- Employer: St Patrick's Academy, Dungannon
- Known for: Association with the Tyrone Gaelic football team, Participation in The Rose of Tralee,
- Spouse: John McAreavey
- Parent(s): Mickey and Marian Harte

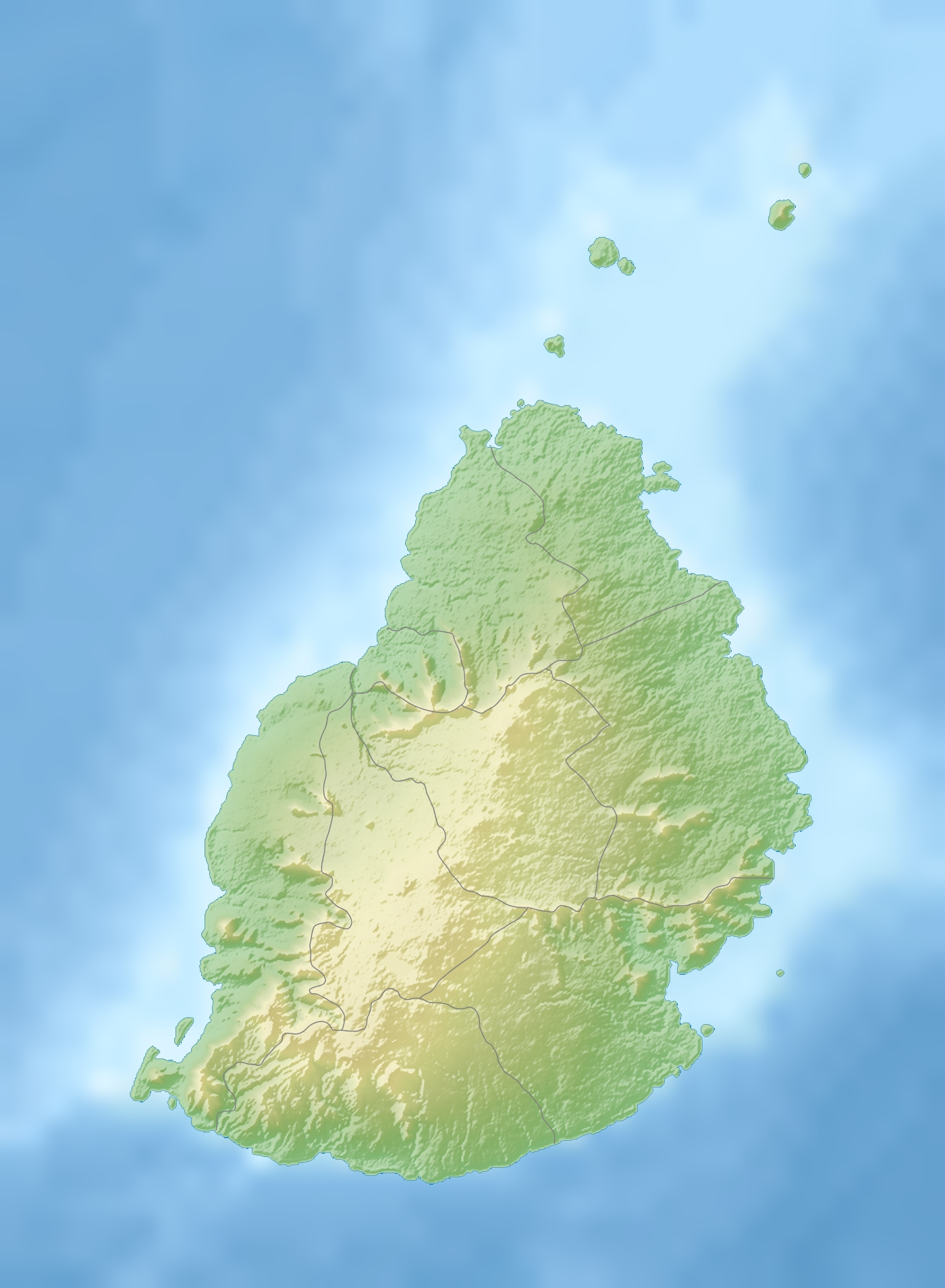
Location of the LUX Grand Gaube (formerly Legends) Hotel in Mauritius

On 10 January 2011, Michaela McAreavey, a 27-year-old Irish teacher, was found strangled to death in the bathroom of her hotel room in Mauritius while on her honeymoon. Her killing and the subsequent investigation attracted sustained international media attention. It was reported as the first murder of a tourist in Mauritius, prompting expressions of sympathy from Mauritian Prime Minister Navin Ramgoolam.

Two hotel employees were later tried for McAreavey's murder and acquitted by the Supreme Court of Mauritius on 12 July 2012. The handling of the investigation drew significant criticism, including allegations of police misconduct and disputes over the reliability of the evidence. Public anger intensified in July 2012 when a Mauritian newspaper published crime scene photographs of McAreavey's body, leading to diplomatic protests from Ireland. Further inquiries were launched in the years that followed, and the case has remained the subject of ongoing police investigation and international attention.

== Victim ==
Michaela McAreavey was a 27-year-old Irish teacher from Glencull, near Ballygawley in County Tyrone, Northern Ireland, and the daughter of Tyrone Gaelic football manager Mickey Harte. She represented Ulster at the 2004 Rose of Tralee.

A devout Catholic, McAreavey taught Irish and religion at St Patrick's Academy, Dungannon. She was a member of the Pioneer Total Abstinence Association and ran the school's "Pioneer Club", encouraging students to abstain from alcohol. She married John McAreavey on 30 December 2010.

== Murder ==
On 10 January 2011, McAreavey and John had lunch at their hotel in Grand Gaube. At about 2:44 pm, she returned to their room to get biscuits. When she did not return after 20 to 30 minutes, John went to the room to look for her and found her dead in the bath. Investigators concluded that she was attacked on entering the room and strangled, after which her body was placed in the bath and the water turned on.

== Investigation ==
Three hotel employees, Avinash Treebhoowoon, Sandeep Moonea, and Raj Theekoy, were arrested in connection with the killing. They appeared in court in Mauritius on 12 January 2011. Treebhoowoon and Mooneea were charged with McAreavey's murder, and Theekoy was charged with conspiracy to murder. DNA samples were taken from the suspects. A week later, two hotel security officers, Dassen Narayen and Seenarain Mungoo, were arrested and charged with aiding and abetting. Mungoo was released and the charges against him were dropped on 12 February 2011. Narayen was also cleared. His fingerprints had been found on a towel in the room after he handed it to John when the alarm was raised.

== Funeral ==
McAreavey was brought home and a traditional Irish wake was held. Attendees included retired bishop of Derry Edward Daly, GAA president Christy Cooney, First Minister Peter Robinson, deputy First Minister Martin McGuinness and several other political and sporting figures.

Her funeral took place on 17 January 2011 at St Malachy's, Ballymacilroy, the church where she had married. Thousands of mourners attended, including President of Ireland Mary McAleese and Northern Ireland's First Minister and Deputy First Minister. People from both nationalist and unionist communities paid their respects. A simultaneous Mass was held in Mauritius, led by Father Philippe Goupille. McAreavey was buried in her wedding dress.

== Trial ==
The trial of two hotel workers for McAreavey's murder began in Mauritius on 22 May 2012. On 6 June 2012, John told the court that police had handcuffed him and examined his body for marks on the day of his wife's murder. He also said that he had seen one of the accused, Avinash Treebhoowoon, twice within a few minutes that afternoon. He told the court that after McAreavey failed to return from getting biscuits for their tea, he went to their hotel room and found her unconscious in the bath with the tap running. He lifted her onto the floor and attempted to revive her. A forensic expert from England reported that no DNA traces from the two accused or the other original suspects were found on McAreavey's body or at the crime scene.

The Major Crime Investigation Team (MCIT) of the Mauritius Police Force faced criticism over its handling of the case. Treebhoowoon alleged that officers had beaten him for three days before he confessed to strangling McAreavey after she interrupted him and co-accused Sandeep Moonea during a theft from her hotel room.

=== Verdict ===
On 12 July 2012, Judge Prithviraj Fekna instructed the jury to disregard any potential effect of its verdict on Mauritius's international reputation and to base its decision on the evidence. After two hours of deliberation, the jury unanimously acquitted Treebhoowoon and Moonea. The McAreavey and Harte families subsequently said they were devastated by the outcome. Lawyers for Treebhoowoon and Moonea called for the evidence to be examined by investigators outside Mauritius and criticised the MCIT's handling of the case.

== Aftermath ==
Following the verdict, the Mauritian government said it was considering further action aimed at bringing those responsible for McAreavey's murder to justice. Some Irish people subsequently called for a boycott of Mauritius's tourism industry, a campaign supported by Irish politician Seán Kelly.

On 15 July 2012, the Mauritian newspaper Sunday Times published crime scene photographs, including images of McAreavey's body. A spokesperson for the Harte and McAreavey families criticised the publication. Taoiseach Enda Kenny said the Irish Government would lodge a formal complaint with the Mauritian government, while Mauritian police opened an inquiry into how the photographs had been published. The newspaper's editor and director general, Imran Hosany, was arrested on 18 July and charged in connection with their publication before being released on bail.

A new investigation team was established in August 2012. Thirty-eight people were interviewed, 68 witnesses participated in a reconstruction of events, and 350 DNA samples were sent to a laboratory in France. On 27 December 2012, police submitted a report to the Director of Public Prosecutions naming a suspect.

In August 2015, John and his relatives received nearly 65 million rupees (approximately £1.6 million) following a case against the Legends Hotel. McAreavey's legal representative, Dick Ng Sui Wa, said the parties had reached a confidential settlement through mediation.

In September 2016, John married Tara Brennan. They have three children.

In August 2020, John said the Mauritian government had informed him of a new inquiry into his wife's murder. In June 2021, the government agreed to re-examine the investigation.

Former suspect and key witness Raj Theekoy was reported missing on 1 October 2021 and was found dead two days later. Although his death was rumoured to have been suicide, police continued their inquiries.

The MCIT arrested former hotel watchman Dassen Narayen again on 29 March 2022 after new evidence emerged. Charges against him had previously been dropped in 2013 after he alleged that he had been tortured by police.

In November 2025, ahead of the 15th anniversary of McAreavey's death, Tánaiste Simon Harris met members of her family, including John, to reaffirm Ireland's support for the investigation. The discussions included diplomatic engagement with Mauritian and UK authorities and an offer of technical assistance from the Police Service of Northern Ireland.

== See also ==
- Match for Michaela
