= Christian Brothers Grammar School, Omagh =

Boys grammar school in County Tyrone, Northern Ireland

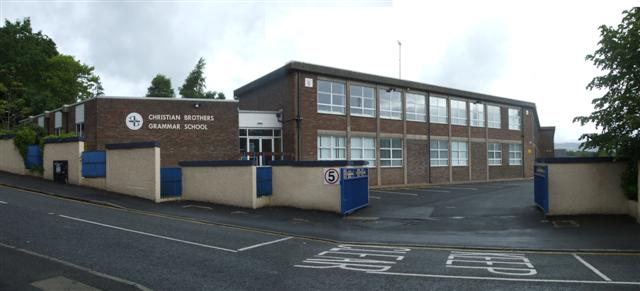
- School badge Christian Brother's Grammar School, Omagh. The main access is from the Kevlin Road.

Location
- Kevlin Road; Omagh, County Tyrone, BT78 1LD; Northern Ireland; 54.598°N 7.302°W

Information
- Type: Boys–only grammar school
- Motto: Latin: Facere et Docere; English: To do and to teach
- Religious affiliation: Catholic
- Established: 1861; 165 years ago
- Local authority: Education Authority (Western)
- Principal: Stephen Keown
- Staff: 110
- Years offered: Year 8-Year 14
- Gender: Boys
- Age range: 11-18
- Enrollment: 944 boys (2023)
- Colour
- Website: cbsomagh.org

The Christian Brothers Grammar School, Omagh is a state funded 11–18 boys grammar school in Omagh, County Tyrone, Northern Ireland. It is the largest grammar school in Omagh, and is under the trusteeship of the Edmund Rice Schools Trust (NI). On 14 January 1881 the school officially opened, with 121 boys presenting themselves for admission.

The school was founded on 14 January 1861, on Mount St. Columba by "The Brothers" who were in the town of Omagh, who established the school after being given the responsibility of ensuring that education was gratuitous and the students had free admission on entry. The school is known locally as "The Brothers, Omagh CBS" or Scoil Ghramadaí na mBráithre Críostaí, An Omaigh, which is its native name in Irish.

== History ==
=== Establishment ===
The school was founded on 14 January 1861, on Mount St. Columba. "The Brothers" in Omagh were given the responsibility of ensuring that "Education be gratuitous and the admission free." On 14 January 1861 the school officially opened, with 121 boys presenting themselves for admission.

=== Growth and extension ===
An extension was completed to the original building in 1903 as the school community continued to grow. The extension consisted of a second floor to the school and a third to the brothers' house. This came at the time at a considerable cost of £1,200, partly financed by an £800 loan from past pupils. Operations of the school were moved to old Church, Brook Street while construction was under way. Once finished the renovations provided the school with three more rooms; one for Manual Instruction, a sixty student accommodating classroom and a room with all the necessities for Practical and Experimental Science. By 1932, a new building was constructed to accommodate 125 Secondary School pupils and 6 teachers (2 Brothers), with the full site also consisting of 210 Primary School pupils and 6 teachers (5 Brothers).

The school continued to increase in numbers throughout the 1950s, with 216 Grammar School pupils and 361 Primary School pupils along with 16 staff in total by 1955. The centenary celebrations of the school were marked during January 1961, with a local housing development being named Centenary Park to commemorate the centenary of the school.

=== New build ===
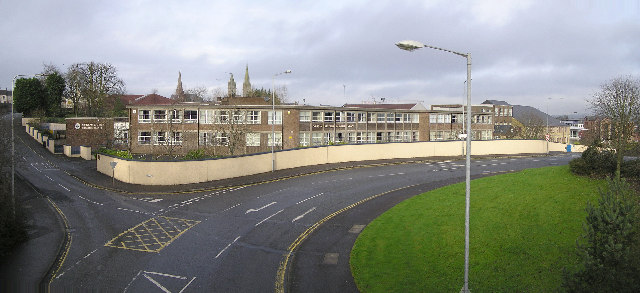
CBS Omagh building on Kevlin Road, 2006

Since the construction of a new building completed in 1967, the original school building has since gone into other use as a retreat. A primary school, Holy Family Primary School - Junior Site (previously St Colmcille's Primary School), has been the school there since. Its original headmaster was Brother John Redmond. On its first day of activity one hundred and twenty boys, all aged between five and fifteen, showed up.

The school moved to is present site on Kevlin Road in 1967. The school building officially opened on Kevlin Road on 4 September 1967. In 1993, after the resignation of Brother McCrohan, the school appointed its first non-clerical headmaster, Roddy Tierney, a former pupil of the school and a teacher in the school. The Principal is Stephen Keown, who moved to Omagh CBS in June 2025, after a previous teaching role in China.

In 2000, the school opened a new Sports Complex at Coolnagard and, in 2007, the school won the Hogan Cup, making the school All Ireland Colleges Champions in Gaelic Football. The beginning of the 21st Century saw the school maintain its high standards of academic excellence, as well as an unprecedented period of sporting excellence. Academic rewards included record breaking A-Level and GCSE results, as well as numerous pupils attaining top place in subjects at both GCSE and A-Level. In 2018, the school celebrated 50 years on the Kevlin Road site.

=== Strule campus ===
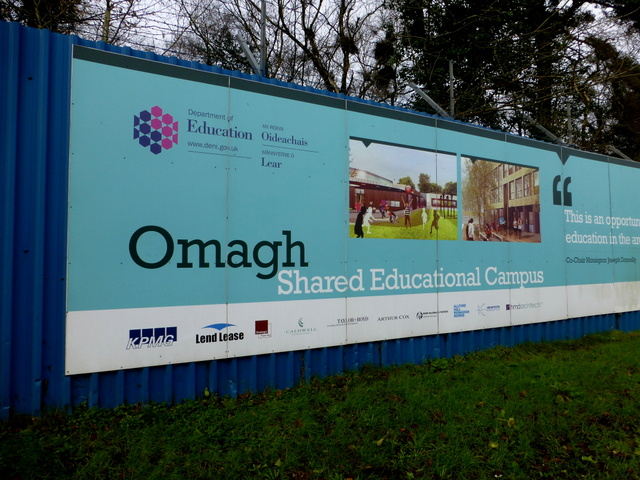
Hoarding erected around the site perimeter in 2016, using the initial planning name of Omagh Shared Educational Campus

Initially, it was planned that by 2026, the school will relocate with five other schools to a shared campus. The other schools are Loreto Grammar School, Omagh, Omagh High School, Sacred Heart College, Omagh and Omagh Academy which will join Arvalee Special School. the Strule Shared Education Campus is the largest ever school-building project in Northern Ireland hye. On 18 July 2024, the Northern Ireland Executive gave the project the go ahead, with the Department of Education minister Paul Givan saying the project is "a new and pioneering approach which will inform the future development of education in Northern Ireland over the coming decades". He further said that shared education "has a key role in developing a peaceful and shared society and the Strule Campus is a vital component in the Executive's vision of delivering a more peaceful and prosperous society for all". Following the announcement, the new date of which the Strule Shared Education Campus will be completed by is September 2028.

The new build Christian Brothers Grammar School as part of the campus is to be located centrally within the campus, located to the north of the campus beside the Shared Education Centre and in close proximity to the Shared Sports Centre. The new build for the school is to be designed in three distinct parts; a two-storey wing to the east, a central three storey wing and a single storey wing to the west.

In April 2025, it was announced that the Principal, Foncy McConnell, would retire from his post. Stephen Keown was subsequently appointed as McConnell's successor as Principal.

== Overview ==
=== Ethos and values ===
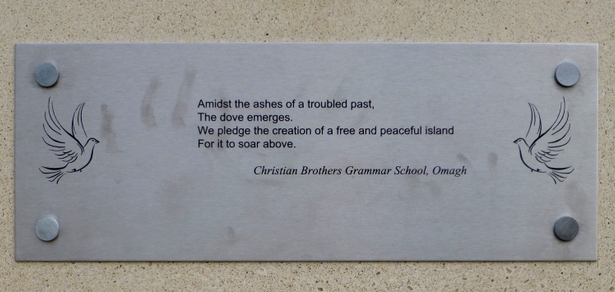
Peace pledge, Christian Brothers Grammar School

Christian Brothers' Grammar School, Omagh is part of the Edmund Rice Schools network and subscribes to the Edmund Rice Schools Trust's Charter. These values focus on teaching and lifelong learning, caring for one another, the development of the Catholic faith, transformational leadership and a genuine sense of community and partnership. Admission of boys to the school indicate that both the boys attending, and their parents, subscribe to the school's status as an Edmund Rice School, an acceptance of all school regulations by each student and his parents and an undertaking to observe all such regulations. Boys attending Christian Brothers' Grammar School, Omagh will have the opportunity to nurture their faith through active participation in whole school masses, collective acts of worship and daily prayer.

The school operates a School Development Fund, with parents of each student attending being asked to contribute £60 towards the Christian Brothers School Development Fund. For families with two sons attending, the contribution is £100 and £120 for three or more sons attending the school. Contributions to the school development fund are used exclusively to benefit the students, providing additional resources and facilities beyond the allocated school budget allowance.

=== School uniform ===
The school states that its school uniform is a "visible statement of each student's allegiance to this school community". The school's current uniform policy is as follows:

Compulsory School Uniform

- Black blazer with school crest
- Long black school trousers
- Light blue shirt with long or short sleeves as preferred
- School tie
- Plain black formal shoes or boots without any decoration
- P.E. Kit

Optional: Royal blue v-neck jumper.

Boys attending the school are expected to wear their blazers when moving between classes, but may remove them during class. Additionally, the school places an expectation that boys' shirts should always be buttoned at the neck and cuffs, and ties should be properly worn. Additionally, the school expects that t-shirts or vests, or other undergarments worn under the shirt, should be white and not visible at the shirt collar or cuffs. Boys are not permitted to wear coloured or printed t-shirts which are visible through their shirts.

Boys are only permitted to wear formal style black leather shoes or boots. Trainers or canvas style footwear are not permitted. No deviation or variation from orthodox black shoes or boots is permitted.

== Learning and teaching ==
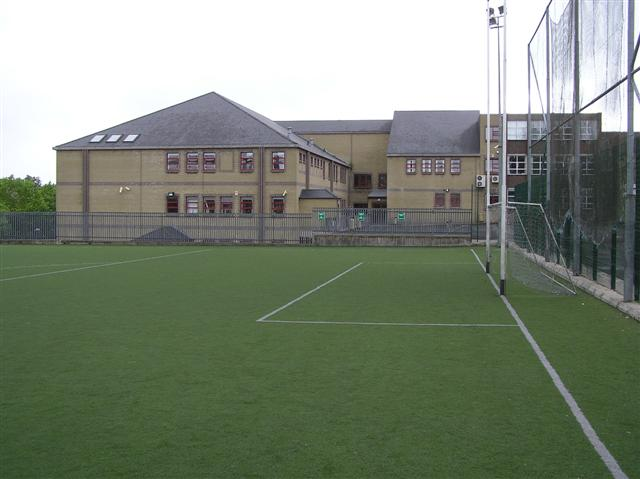
Sports pitch, with the school building in the background

=== Curriculum subjects ===
The school's focus is academic, offering compulsory subjects of English Literature, English Language, Science, and Mathematics until GCSE. The School also focuses on the teachings of the Catholic faith, making Religious Studies compulsory at GCSE, and A-Level.

The Christian Brothers' Grammar School, Omagh offers a full school curriculum, including;

- Science,
- Information Communication Technology (ICT),
- Music,
- Languages,
- Art and Design,
- Performing Arts,
- History,
- Geography,
- Religious Education (RE),
- Technology and Design
- Physical Education (PE).

As well as meeting the Northern Ireland statutory entitlement for curriculum provision, the Christian Brothers' Grammar School aims to ensure its curriculum provision to allow every pupil to fulfil his academic potential, meet the individual learning needs of every pupil by ensuring the curriculum is diverse, stimulating and tailored to the employment needs of our local and global economy. Additionally, the school's curriculum aims to develops students' independent learning skills, thinking skills and personal capabilities as well as developing a "genuine" sense of community whilst seeking to enhance the spiritual, moral and personal development of all students.

=== Extra–curricular and sports ===
In Gaelic football, the school has won the MacRory Cup (the highest level for Ulster schools) in 1974, 2001, 2005, 2007, 2023 & 2024 and the All Ireland Hogan Cup in 2007, 2023 & 2024. and many other under-age level competitions for example Omagh CBS won the Rannafast Cup in 2009, 2012 and 2024 and the McCormick cup in 2008, 2009 and 2011.

== Attainment ==
In 2018, 94.2% of its entrants achieved five or more GCSEs at grades A* to C, including the core subjects English and Maths. In 2019 the school was ranked 18th out of 159 secondary schools in Northern Ireland with 86.7% of its A-level students who sat the exams in 2017/18 being awarded three A*-C grades.

The school had an overall attendance rate of 89.6% (2021–22), and in 2023, had 950 boys enrolled (exclusive of statemented students) and 135 admissions.

=== Year 12 attainment ===
Attainment of boys attending CBS Omagh in core GCSE subjects
Subject	CBS Omagh A* - B	Northern Ireland A* - B Average
English Language	78.80%	73%
Mathematics	76.10%	72%
English Literature	71.50%	75%
Irish	86.80%	75%

=== Year 14 attainment ===
Attainment of boys attending CBS Omagh in core GCE A level subjects
Subject	CBS Omagh A* - B	Northern Ireland A* - B Average
Information Technology	73.60%	77.50%
Mathematics	91.00%	90.60%
English Literature	78.90%	86.90%
Mathematics Further	91.50%	94.20%

== Notable former pupils ==
- Conor Bradley (born 2003)-Association footballer
- Joe Byrne (Northern Ireland politician) (born 1953)—Social Democratic and Labour Party politician
- Dermot Carlin (born 1984)-Gaelic footballer
- Garry Courtney - professor of medicine
- Brian D'Arcy (born 1945)—priest, writer and broadcaster
- Mickey Harte (born 1952)—Gaelic football manager
- Ciaran Martin (born 1974)—professor of practice and former CEO of the National Cyber Security Centre
- Joe McMahon (born 1983)—Gaelic footballer
- Gerard McSorley (born 1950)—actor
- Fabian Monds (born 1940)—BBC governor
- Stephen O'Neill (born 1980)—Gaelic footballer

== See also ==
- Christian Brothers of Ireland
- Edmund Rice
