= St Ronan's College =

Coordinates: 54.4617°N 6.3478°W

St. Ronan's College

Location
- Cornakinnegar Road; Lurgan, County Armagh, BT67 9NA; Northern Ireland

Information
- Type: Voluntary Grammar
- Motto: Pro Omnibus Excellentia (Excellence for all)
- Religious affiliation: Catholic
- Local authority: Education Authority (Southern)
- Principal: Fiona Kane
- Staff: 70
- Gender: Mixed
- Age: 11 to 18
- Enrolment: 1743
- Colour
- Website: https://stronanslurgan.org.uk/

St Ronan's College (Irish: Colaiste Naomh Ronan) is a voluntary grammar school located in Lurgan, County Armagh, Northern Ireland.

== History ==
The college formed on 1 September 2015 when the three previous schools in Lurgan combined: St Paul’s Junior High School, St Mary’s High School and St Michael’s Grammar School. The college initially operated on three sites but in 2021 work began on a new single building on a 36-acre site at Container Road. The total investment on this new building will be £30million. Students moved into the new facility in 2025. It was anticipated that the new college building would accommodate 1750 pupils.

== Facilities ==
The new school will provide greatly enhanced facilities. Besides general classrooms the new school will have specialist rooms for art, science, drama, technology, music, business studies, ICT, home economics and careers. There will also be a sixth form centre, a canteen/dining room, a multi-purpose hall and a library. There will be a range of sporting facilities including grass and synthetic football pitches, a multi-purpose sports hall, a gymnasium/hall and a fitness suite.

Classrooms in the college are currently named after one of seventeen different saints: Gemma, Brigid, Teresa, Elizabeth, Rita, Joseph, John, Paul, Anthony, Mary, Michael, Bernadette, Catherine, Clare, Cecilia, Francis and Peter.

== Academics ==
The full range of subjects is offered. At GCSE A-level, the students can choose from Art & Design, Government & Politics, Biology, Health & Life Science, Physics, Business Studies, Health & Social Care, Religious Studies, Chemistry, History, Spanish, Design & Technology, Home Economics, Sport Studies, Drama & Theatre Studies, Digital Technology, French, Polish, Sociology, Economics, Irish, and Software Systems Development, Engineering and Law. The Education and Training Inspectorate of the college, just one year after it opened, described its achievements and standards as good.

== Awards ==
The Duais na Dúthrachta Award (Dedication Award) is awarded each year by the Board of Governors to the member of staff or pupils who have demonstrated exceptional performance.

In 2021, the college was awarded almost €90,000 in Erasmus+ funding to run a Key Action 2 Strategic Partnership for Schools project with partner schools in France, Italy, Germany, Greece and Austria.

== See also ==
- List of secondary schools in Northern Ireland
- List of grammar schools in Northern Ireland
