= Holy Trinity College, Cookstown =

- Coláiste na Tríonóide Naofa, An Chorr Chríochach

Location
- Chapel Street; Cookstown, County Tyrone, BT80 8QB; Northern Ireland; 54.6415°N 6.746°W

Information
- Type: Secondary school
- Motto: Inspiration, Innovation, Excellence
- Religious affiliation: Roman Catholic
- Established: 1965
- Local authority: Education Authority (Southern)
- Principal: Desi McNeill
- Gender: Mixed
- Age range: 11–18
- Enrolment: 1,021
- Colours: Black and green
- Website: www.holytrinitycollege.org

Holy Trinity College (Irish: Coláiste na Tríonóide Naofa) is an 11–18 mixed Roman Catholic secondary school and sixth form in Cookstown, County Tyrone, Northern Ireland. It was established in 1994 through the amalgamation of St Patrick’s High School and Our Lady’s High School, which had originally opened in 1965 as separate boys’ and girls’ Voluntary Secondary Schools.

== History ==
The school first opened in September 1965 as two separate institutions:

St Patrick’s Boys Secondary Intermediate School, an all-boys school, and Our Lady’s Girls Secondary School, located in the adjacent building. These were later renamed St Patrick’s High School and Our Lady’s High School. In 1993, the two schools officially merged to form Holy Trinity College, a co-educational Catholic secondary school serving students aged 11–18.

In 2023, construction began on a new £35 million facility at the rear of the existing Chapel Street site. Designed to accommodate up to 1,300 pupils, the new building includes modern classrooms, sports facilities, and a central courtyard. Construction was completed in October 2025, after which the original school buildings were demolished as part of Phase 2 of the redevelopment.

== Academics ==
The school offers instruction at both GCSE and A-level. In 2018, 55.1% of its entrants achieved five or more GCSEs at grades A* to C, including the core subjects English and Maths. Also in 2018, 52.5% of its entrants to the A-level exam achieved A*-C grades.
