= St Louis Grammar School, Kilkeel =

Location
- 151 Newry Road; Kilkeel, County Down, BT34 4EU; Northern Ireland
- Coordinates: 54.065°N 6.031°W

Information
- Type: Voluntary grammar
- Religious affiliation: Roman Catholic
- Established: 1922
- Local authority: Education Authority (South Eastern)
- Principal: Kevin Martin
- Gender: Male/Female
- Age: 11 to 18
- Enrolment: 570
- Capacity: 700
- Website: www.stlouis.org.uk

St Louis Grammar School, Kilkeel is a Roman Catholic secondary school located in Kilkeel, County Down, Northern Ireland. It is a co-educational school for pupils aged 11 to 18, with about 700 pupils enrolled.

== History ==
The school was founded in 1922 by the Order of St Louis as a selective Catholic boarding school for girls.

== Catchment ==
The pupils come from the surrounding catchment area: Warrenpoint, Annalong, Newcastle, Castlewellan, Hilltown and Rostrevor.

== Academics ==
The school is a co-educational Specialist School in Technology and ICT that caters for pupils aged 11–18. It offers a broad range of subjects at all Key Stages including GCSEs, A levels and BTECs including Academic and Vocational/Applied subjects. Staff offer the full range of STEM subjects - Science, Technology, Engineering, Maths and ICT. The school uses an online Virtual Learning Environment.

=== Results ===
In 2018, 84.1% of its entrants achieved five or more GCSEs at grades A* to C, including the core subjects English and Maths.

In 2019 the school was ranked 6th out of 159 secondary schools in Northern Ireland with 91.2% of its A-level students who entered the exams in 2017/18 being awarded three A*-C grades.
