= St Patrick's Academy, Dungannon =

Coordinates: 54.508°N 6.758°W

St. Patrick's Academy Acadamh Naomh Pádraig

Location
- Killymeal Road; Dungannon, County Tyrone, BT71 6DS; Northern Ireland

Information
- Motto: Ille Docebit Vos Omnia
- Religious affiliation: Catholic
- Founder: 1891 Roman Catholic Clergy
- Specialists: Business Studies, Science
- Headteacher: Colin Holmes
- Staff: 129
- Gender: Mixed
- Age: 11 to 18
- Enrolment: 1893 (172,500 alumni)
- Colours: Red and White (Gaelic Football Team) and Pale Blue and Navy (Camogie)
- Website: http://www.stpatricksacademy.org.uk/

Saint Patrick's Academy (Irish: Acadamh Naomh Pádraig) is a voluntary grammar school located in Dungannon, County Tyrone, Northern Ireland. It formed on 1 September 2003 when the two single-sex Saint Patrick's Academies, which coexisted on the same site as two distinct and separate institutions, were merged as one. In January 2013 the Education Minister John O'Dowd announced the school was one of 22 schools to get a new build project.

== History ==
Founded in 1891, St. Patrick's Academy was, for its first three years, a boys' school. From September 1894, the Sisters of Mercy undertook the teaching of students in preparation for the Intermediate board's examination. The Girls' Academy was based in a single room in the newly built Mercy Convent on Northland Row.

Both schools moved to new premises on Killyman Road in September 1901; the academy building was to be the home of the school for the next seventy years. The Boys' Academy was always led by the clergymen appointed by the Tyrone Roman Catholic Board of Education, while the Girls' Academy was led by a senior member of the Sisters of Mercy.

The academy eventually outgrew its home on the Killyman Road. In 1975, the two schools moved to a new building on Killymeal Road. Although housed in the same building, the Boys' Academy and Girls' Academy were two distinct and separate institutions. The growth in the student numbers resulted in the formal amalgamation of the Boys' and Girls' Academies with effect from 2003. This amalgamation was encouraged by the N.I. Minister of Education, Martin McGuinness.

As of 2007, the co-educational Academy and its some 1893 students are housed in one main building and a number of separate mobile structures belonging to the former Saint Patrick's Boys' and Saint Patrick's Girls' Academies. Saint Patrick's Academy's present grounds are demolished and students moved into the new school on 1 September 2018. Saint Patrick's College, Dungannon currently has its new school built beside Saint Patrick's Academy, facilitating the sharing of some amenities.

== Motto ==
The school motto Ille vos docebit omnia is taken from the Gospel of St. John (14:26). It can be translated as He (the Holy Spirit) can teach you everything.

== Academics ==
The academy offers instruction in a full range of subjects at both GCSE and A-Level and specialises in science and business studies. In 2018, 94.2% of its entrants achieved five or more GCSEs at grades A* to C, including the core subjects English and Maths. 82.2% of its students who entered the A-level exams in 2017/18 were awarded three A*-C grades.

== Sporting ==
Saint Patrick's Academy, Dungannon, has won trophies and cups at various levels in Gaelic football, soccer, ladies Gaelic football, basketball, netball, hurling and camogie. In St Patrick's Academy, Dungannon, 2008, was the first school in the island of Ireland to have won the MacRory and Hogan Cups and have representatives on the winning All-Ireland Senior and Minor Tyrone Gaelic Football teams. The school again won the MacRory Cup in 2009. Their first success in the history of the MacRory cup came against the Mighty St. Colmans Newry (many of whom have won All-Ireland senior medals) in 1991 against all odds on a scoreline of 2–7 to 1–9. The academy also was at the forefront of basketball in Ulster and Ireland during the late 1980s and 1990s, winning many Ulster titles and having many Irish international players and Ulster rep players, many of whom won Ulster medals in 1991 in both GAA and basketball.

== Notable alumni ==
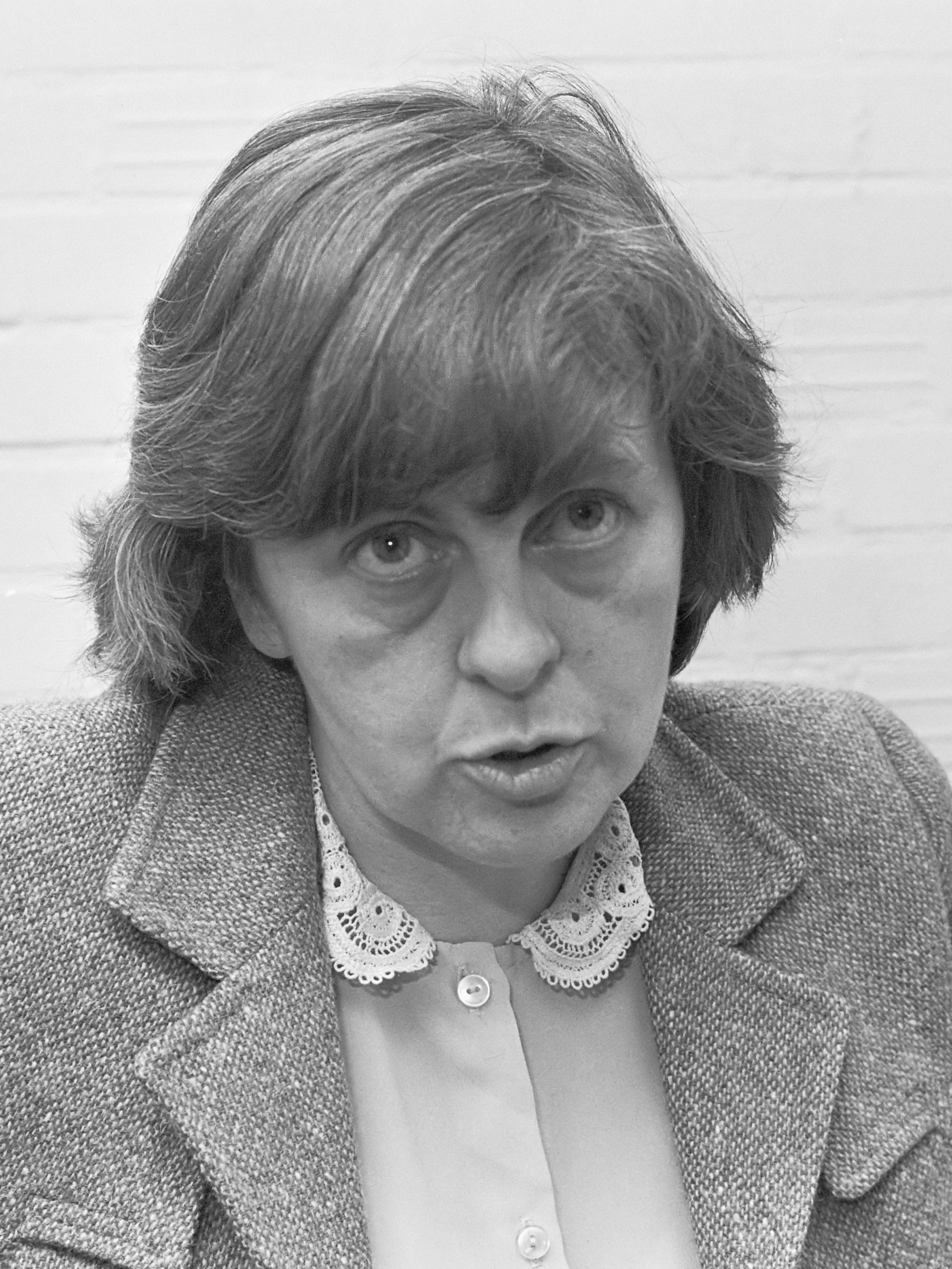
Bernadette Devlin McAliskey politician

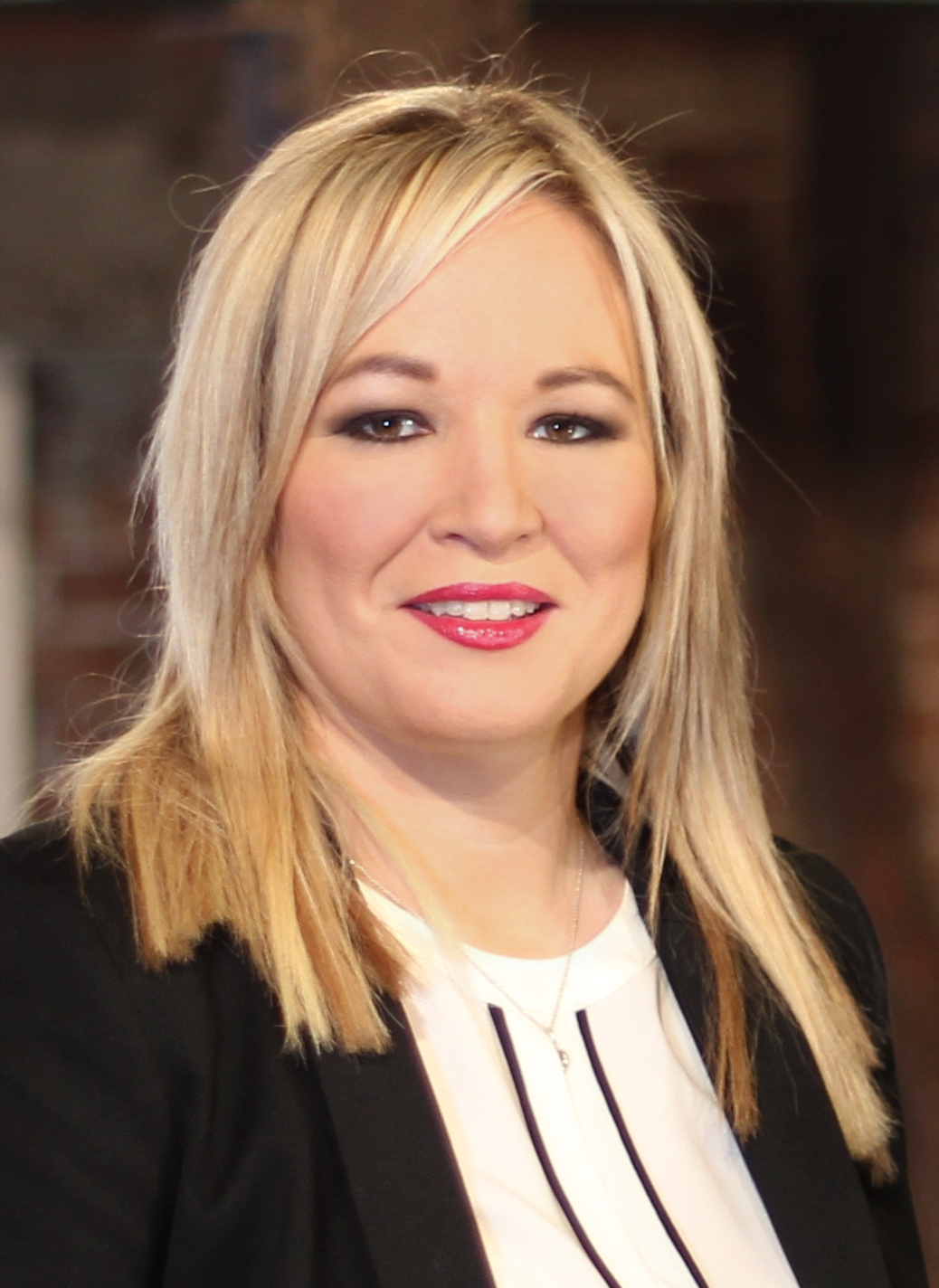
Michelle O'Neill politician

- Paddy Duffy (1934–1996) – Irish nationalist politician
- Austin Currie (1939–2021) – civil rights leader; politician
- Bernadette Devlin McAliskey (born 1947) – republican socialist activist and former Member of Parliament (United Kingdom)
- Gerry McKenna MRIA (born 1953) – biologist and university vice-chancellor
- Dominic Gates (born 1954) – Reporter and Pulitzer Prize winner
- Pádraig McKearney (1954–1987) – Irish republican, killed during a British Army ambush at Loughgall, County Armagh
- Michelle O'Neill (born 1977) – Sinn Féin MLA for Mid Ulster and party leader in Northern Ireland. She is the first nationalist to hold the office of First Minister.
- Michaela McAreavey (1983–2011) – daughter of Mickey Harte (she was murdered on her honeymoon in Mauritius)
- Andrea Begley (born 1987) – singer who won the second series of the BBC talent search The Voice UK
- Fra Fee (born 1987) – actor and singer
- Sheree Atcheson (born 1991) – 2019 Queen's University Belfast Graduate of the Year and founder of I Am Lanka.
- Damian Casey (1993–2022), regarded as Tyrone's greatest ever hurler
- Eóin Tennyson (born 1998) – Alliance MLA for Upper Bann.

== Notable staff ==
- Monsignor Liam McEntegart – priest and promoter of the Irish language who taught at the academy from 1953 and was principal and president from 1961 to 1983; subsequently Vicar General of the Archdiocese of Armagh.
- Monsignor Denis Faul – priest and civil rights campaigner who taught at the academy and served as principal from 1983 until 1998.
