= Naas C.B.S. =

- Méanscoil Iognáid Rís Nás na Riogh
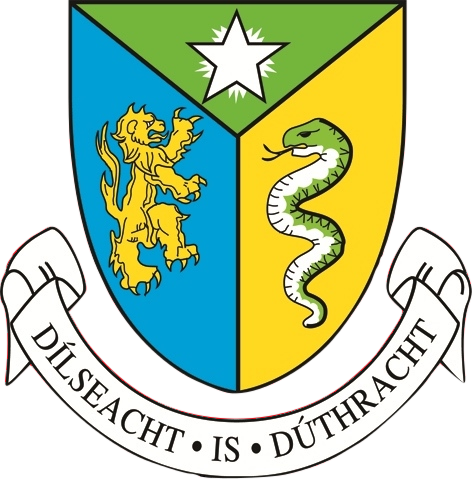

Location
- Naas, County Kildare; Ireland; 53.215984°N 6.662041°W

Information
- Motto: "Dílseacht is Dúthracht" (Loyalty and Diligence)
- Religious affiliation: Roman Catholic
- Established: 1871
- Principal: Ben Travers
- Years offered: 1st Year - 3rd Year (Junior Cycle), Transition Year (4th Year), 5th Year- 6th Year (Senior Cycle).
- Gender: Male
- Age: 12 Years to 19 Years
- Enrollment: c. 1100
- Campus: Urban
- Colours: Blue and Yellow
- Website: naascbs.ie

Naas C.B.S. (Irish: Méanscoil Iognáid Rís Nás na Riogh) is a Christian Brothers secondary school in Naas, County Kildare, Ireland.

== History ==
Méanscoil Iognáid Rís is a voluntary secondary school under the trusteeship of the Edmund Rice Schools Trust (E.R.S.T). The school, named after the founder of the order Edmund Rice, opened its doors in September 1871. The Moat Hall as it is now known was both monastery and school for the Brothers until 1903, when the monastery on Friary Road was built. For over seventy years both the primary and secondary schools were housed in the hall. In 1954 St. Corban's B.N.S was built and four years later the secondary school moved to its present site on St. Corban's Lane.

== Extracurricular activities ==
In February 2022, the school's Gaelic football team won a Leinster Final in St. Conleths Park against Maynooth.

Naas CBS also has a rugby team, badminton team, hurling team, cross country team, basketball team, soccer team and a tennis team.

Along with the school's sports teams, there is a Green Schools Committee, a Yearbook Committee, a beekeeper club and a student council.

On March 17, 2022 Naas CBS were the winners of the Hogan Cup. This win is credited mainly to the school's supporters, the “Barmy Army”, who are the most well known Gaelic Football "ultras" in Ireland.

== Notable staff ==
Historian Chris Lawlor was formerly head of the school's history department, having also attended as a student.

Pádraig Nolan was teaching at the school when he was appointed manager of the Kildare county football team in 2002.

== Notable past pupils ==
- Niall Madden, Irish Jockey who won the 2006 Grand National steeplechase on Numbersixvalverde
- David Prendergast, former lead singer of indie band Miracle Bell
- Charlie McCreevy, former Minister for Finance and European Commissioner for Internal Market and Services
- Adam Byrne, Connacht, Leinster and Ireland rugby player.
- Sean and Conor Price, former X Factor contestants (2017)
- Matt Faughnan, Musician/Entertainer.
- Shane Beatty, Newstalk broadcaster
- Jamie Osborne (rugby union)Leinster and Ireland rugby player
