= MacRory Cup =

Gaelic football competition

- Code: Gaelic football
- Founded: 1923
- Region: Ulster (GAA)
- Trophy: MacRory Cup
- Title holders: Abbey Christian Brothers' Grammar School (6th title)
- First winner: St Patrick's Grammar School, Armagh
- Most titles: St Colman's College, Newry (20 titles)
- Sponsors: Danske Bank
- TV partner: BBC
- Official website: MacRory Cup

The MacRory Cup is an inter-college (school) Gaelic football tournament in Ulster at senior "A" grade. The MacLarnon Cup is the competition for schools at senior 'B' grade.

Players must be under nineteen at the start of the tournament. The winners advance to the semi-finals of the Hogan Cup, the All-Ireland colleges "A" senior football championship.

The competition and trophy are named after Joseph MacRory, then Bishop of Down and Connor, who donated the first cup in 1923, he later became Archbishop of Armagh and Primate of All Ireland in 1928.

The current champions are Abbey CBS, Newry, after beating St Patrick's Academy, Dungannon in the Athletic Grounds in Armagh.

The final was previously held every year on (or close to) Saint Patrick's Day and is televised live on BBC Northern Ireland along with the Ulster Rugby Schools Cup final, but since 2021 has been played in mid-February. The venue for the last number of years has been the Athletic Grounds in Armagh. Previous finals have been held in Coalisland, Casement Park and in 2025, Celtic Park, Derry for the first time ever.

== History ==
An inter-seminary football competition between St Macartan's College, Monaghan and St Patrick's Grammar School, Armagh had been started in 1902. This was a soccer competition until, in the aftermath of the 1916 Rising, a vote was taken to change over to Gaelic rules and St Patrick's won the first Gaelic encounter in 1918 by 4–4 to 0–1.

Bishop Joseph MacRory, the Bishop of Down and Connor at this time, "offered" to present a Cup for the winners of an Ulster Secondary schools' competition. The "offer" was not honoured for another five seasons however, and, in the interim, the matches between other seminaries and St Patrick's Armagh are recorded as "challenges" until the arrival of the first MacRory Cup in late spring 1923.

Over the next five seasons the competition was played on a league basis until in 1928 an Ulster Colleges' Committee was established and the MacRory Cup competition became the new body's main competition. Participation in the MacRory Cup in its early years was confined to those who attended boarding schools. St Patrick's Armagh were the first winners in 1923, and dominated the competition in its early years. First time victories by other challengers were recorded by St Macartan's (1930), St Patrick's College, Cavan (1935), and St Colman's College, Newry (1949).

The 1930s was notable for the affiliation of a number of Christian Brothers' schools. These were "day schools" (i.e. non boarding schools) which catered mainly for boys from humble backgrounds, but they did not yet have the prowess to compete with the established diocesan colleges, as was confirmed by comprehensive defeats for Monaghan CBS (1935), and Abbey CBS, Newry (1944 and 1947).

1954 was a watershed year in that the triumph of Abbey CBS after a replay over St Patrick's Cavan was the first MacRory Cup win by a "day school"; the Abbey CBS repeated this feat in 1959 and 1964, but no other day school made the breakthrough until St Mary's CBS in 1971; next came Omagh CBS in 1974.

1976 marks another significant landmark in the history of the competition although that particular final ended in defeat for St Patrick's College, Maghera. In a sequence of 14 final appearances by St Patrick's College, Maghera in the following 15 years, 8 of which were won, including 4 consecutive victories 1982–85. Those 15 years witnessed a rivalry between St Patrick's College, Maghera and St Colman's College, Newry when they faced one another in 10 Finals, including replays. These included the final in year 1989 , won by St Patrick's College, Maghera on the scoreline 4–10 to 4–9.

The 1990s marked the arrival of St Patrick's Academy, Dungannon and St Michael's College, Enniskillen at centre stage, and accelerated change in the educational domain with the disappearance of the remaining boarding departments in schools, and an equalisation in standards across a greater range of schools.

The new millennium produced a victory in 2000 for the original kingpins, St Patrick's Armagh, their first victory since 1953, and the next decade was marked by the emergence and appearance of Omagh CBS in 7 Finals.

The MacRory Cup, first donated by Bishop MacRory in 1923, is now contested by 10 schools annually. The original trophy was replaced in 1962, and that trophy, in turn, was retired and donated to the O’Fiaich Library in February 2012. A replacement trophy was donated to Ulster Colleges by Cardinal Brady, thereby perpetuating the historic link between the Archdiocese of Armagh and this competition. The trophy won in March 2012 by St Michael's, Enniskillen is therefore the third cup to bear Cardinal MacRory's name.

The 2020 final, along with all other Gaelic game activity, between St Colman's, Newry and St Patrick's, Maghera was postponed due to the impact of the COVID-19 pandemic on Gaelic games. Ulster Colleges announced in June 2020 that they hoped to find a date in October to play the MacRory and McLarnon Cup finals. Ulster Colleges had provisionally scheduled the MacRory final for 9 October 2020. However the decision to cancel the final was made after an emergency Ulster Schools GAA meeting. As a result, the 2019/20 Danske Bank MacRory Cup was shared between St Patrick's Maghera and St Colman's Newry.

Fifteen schools have their names on the MacRory Cup with St Colman's College, Newry winning the first of their record 19 titles in 1949 and St Patrick's College, Maghera, who are in second place with 15 crowns, won their first in 1977.

St Colman's College, Newry and St Patrick's College, Maghera also lead the way in terms of Hogan Cup titles won by Ulster schools with eight and six respectively.

== Competition format ==
Current format

The format introduced at the start of the 2017–18 season continues. Sixteen teams compete in four groups of four teams. After the group rounds, all matches are knock-out. The four group winners are given byes to the quarter-finals. The four teams who finished third play the four teams who finished fourth in playoff round 1 with the winners playing the four group runners-up in playoff round 2 for the four remaining quarter-final places.

2016-17 format

The format was changed for the 2016–17 season. Fourteen teams competed in three groups - Groups A and B had five teams and Group C had four teams. The three group winners and the best group runner-up advanced to the quarter-finals. The fifth-placed teams in groups A and B were eliminated. The remaining eight teams played-off in four matches with the four winners completing the quarter-final line-up. From the quarter-finals onwards all matches were knock-out.

Previous format

The competition began with a round-robin tournament consisting of two groups of six teams. The top two teams from each group advanced to the knockout stages. Four playoff matches were held between the bottom four teams of Group A and Group B to complete the quarter-final lineup.

== List of titles by college ==
#	Team	Titles	Years won	Finalists	Years
1	St Colman's College, Newry	20	1949, 1950, 1957, 1958, 1960, 1963, 1967, 1968, 1969, 1975, 1976, 1978, 1979, 1981, 1988, 1993, 1998, 2010, 2011, 2020*	7	1945, 1987, 1989, 1990, 1991; 1995, 2017
2	St Patrick's College, Maghera	17	1977, 1980, 1982, 1983, 1984, 1985, 1989, 1990, 1994, 1995, 1996, 2003, 2013, 2014, 2016, 2020, 2025	9	1976, 1978, 1979, 1981, 1986; 1988, 1993, 1998, 2012
3	St Patrick's Grammar School, Armagh	14	1923, 1924, 1925, 1926, 1927, 1928, 1929, 1931, 1944, 1945, 1946, 1947, 1953, 2000	10	1946, 1938, 1943, 1950, 1951; 1952, 1957, 1967, 1994, 1997
4	St Patrick's College, Cavan	12	1935, 1936, 1937, 1939, 1943, 1948, 1951, 1955, 1961, 1962, 1972, 2015	8	1941, 1942, 1954, 1958, 1960, 1963, 1964, 1975
5	St Macartan's College, Monaghan	9	1925, 1930, 1932, 1933, 1934, 1940, 1942, 1952, 1956	3	1953, 2004, 2007
6	St Michael's College, Enniskillen	7	1973, 1992, 1999, 2001*, 2002, 2012, 2019	7	1965, 1968, 1969, 1970,1974, 2000, 2008
7	Abbey Christian Brothers Grammar School, Newry	6	1954, 1959, 1964, 1987, 2006, 2026	9	1944, 1947, 1962, 1971, 1972, 1977, 1980, 1982, 1983
7	Omagh Christian Brothers Grammar School	6	1974, 2001*, 2005, 2007, 2023, 2024	6	1973, 2002, 2009, 2010, 2014, 2019
9	St Patrick's Academy, Dungannon	5	1991, 1997, 2004, 2008, 2009	5	1992, 2011, 2015, 2024, 2026
10	St Malachy's, Belfast	2	1925, 1970	3	1948, 1949, 1955
10	St Mary's College, Dundalk	2	1938, 1941	3	1937, 1939, 1940
10	St Columb's, Derry	2	1965, 1966	—	—N/a
10	St Marys CBGS Belfast	2	1971, 1986	1	1984
10	St Mary's Grammar School, Magherafelt	2	2017, 2022	3	1996, 2003, 2018
15	St Ronan's College, Lurgan	1	2018	—	—N/a

== List of finals by year ==
- Until 1935 the MacRory Cup was played on a league basis with the league winners claiming the title.
- The number in brackets is the number of the title win e.g. ^{(15)} is that school's 15th title.
- The 2001 and 2020 titles were shared as neither competition could be completed.
- Teams in **bold** went on to win the Hogan Cup in the same year.
- The Iggy Jones Man of the Match trophy was first awarded in 1993.

Year	Winner	Score	Score	Opponent	Venue	Winning Captain	Man Of The Match (Iggy Jones)
2026	Abbey CBS, Newry^{(6)}	0-12	0-08	St Patrick's Academy, Dungannon	Armagh	Diarmuid O'Rourke	(Replay) Diarmuid O'Rourke; Abbey CBGS
2025	**St Patrick's College, Maghera^{(17)}**	0-12	2-05	Abbey VS	Derry	Cathal McKaigue	Cathal McKaigue; St Patrick's Maghera
2024	**Omagh CBS ^{(6)}**	1-18	1-12	St Patrick's Academy, Dungannon	Armagh	Callum Daly	Brian Gallagher; Omagh CBS
2023	**Omagh CBS^{(5)}**	0-16	1-06	Holy Trinity College, Cookstown	Omagh	Eoin McElholm	Tomás Haigney; Omagh CBS
2022	St Mary's Grammar School, Magherafelt^{(2)}	2-09	0-08	Holy Trinity College, Cookstown	Armagh	Eoin McEvoy	Niall O'Donnell; St Mary's Magherafelt
2021	Cancelled due to the COVID-19 pandemic						
2020	St Patrick's College, Maghera^{(16)} St Colman's College, Newry^{(20)}	Title shared due to the COVID-19 pandemic				Ethan Doherty; Sean O'Hare	N/A
2019	**St Michael's College, Enniskillen^{(7)}**	0-16	2-06	Omagh CBS	Armagh	Brandon Horan	Darragh McBrien; St Michael's College
2018	**St Ronan's College, Lurgan**	1-09	1-07	St Mary's Grammar School, Magherafelt	Armagh	Jamie Haughey	Rioghan Meehan; St Ronan's College
2017	St Mary's Grammar School, Magherafelt	0-19	0-13	St Colman's College, Newry	Armagh	Declan Cassidy	Declan Cassidy; St Mary's M'Felt
2016	St Patrick's College, Maghera^{(15)}	5-07	1-09	St Paul's High School, Bessbrook	Armagh	Conor Glass	Patrick Kearney; St. Patrick's Maghera
2015	St Patrick's College, Cavan^{(12)}	2-12	0-08	St Patrick's Academy, Dungannon	Armagh	Cian McManus; Pierce Smith	Thomas Galligan; St Patrick's Cavan
2014	St Patrick's College, Maghera^{(14)}	1-12	1-08	Omagh CBS	Armagh	Peter Hagan	Danny Tallon; St Patrick's Maghera
2013	**St Patrick's College, Maghera^{(13)}**	2-05	0-10	St. Paul's High School, Bessbrook	Armagh	Connor Carville	Cormac O'Doherty; St Patrick's Maghera
2012	St Michael's College, Enniskillen^{(6)}	0-09	1-04	St Patrick's College, Maghera	Armagh	Rory Brennan	Eddie Courtney; St Michael's College
2011	**St Colman's College, Newry^{(19)}**	2-09	2-08	St Patrick's Academy, Dungannon	Armagh	Connor Gough	Niall Donnelly; St Colman's Newry
2010	**St Colman's College, Newry^{(18)}**	1-14	1-08	Omagh CBS	Casement Park	Niall McParland	Connor Gough; St Colman's Newry
2009	St Patrick's Academy, Dungannon^{(5)}	2-07	1-09	Omagh CBS	Omagh	David Lavery	Niall McKenna; St Patrick's Academy
2008	**St Patrick's Academy, Dungannon^{(4)}**	0-13	1-09	St Michael's College, Enniskillen	Omagh	Ryan Pickering	Gavin Teague; St Patrick's Academy
2007	**Omagh CBS^{(4)}**	0-10	1-06	St Macartan's College, Monaghan	Casement Park	Gareth Haughey	Colm Greenan; St Macartan's
2006	**Abbey CBS, Newry^{(5)}**	2-04	0-09	St Louis Grammar School, Kilkeel	Casement Park	Kevin McKernan	Martin Clarke; St Louis
2005	Omagh CBS^{(3)}	2-07; 2-09 (R)	0-13; 0-11 (R)	St Louis Grammar School, Kilkeel	Casement Park; Casement Park	Ronan McRory	Joe Ireland; St Louis
2004	St Patrick's Academy, Dungannon^{(3)}	0-08	0-06	St Macartan's College, Monaghan	Casement Park	Ciaran Donnelly	Martin Murray; St Patrick's Academy
2003	**St Patrick's College, Maghera^{(12)}**	1-09	1-04	St Mary's Grammar School, Magherafelt	Casement Park	Gerard O'Kane	Mark Lynch; St Patrick's Maghera
2002	St Michael's College, Enniskillen^{(5)}	1-12	1-05	Omagh CBS	Casement Park	Ryan Keenan	Shaun Doherty; St Michael's College
2001	St Michael's College, Enniskillen^{(4)} Omagh CBS^{(2)}	1-11	2-08	(title shared due to outbreak of foot-and-mouth disease)	Casement Park	Paul Gunn Cormac McAleer	Ciaran O'Reilly; St Michael's College
2000	St Patrick's Grammar School, Armagh^{(14)}	3-06	1-09	St Michael's College, Enniskillen	Casement Park	Kevin Beagan	Liam O'Hare; St Patrick's Armagh
1999	St Michael's College, Enniskillen^{(3)}	4-11	0-12	St Colman's College, Newry	Casement Park	Ciaran Smyth	Colm Bradley; St Michael's College
1998	**St Colman's College, Newry^{(17)}**	2-14	2-07	St Patrick's College, Maghera	Casement Park	Declan Morgan	Aidan Fegan; St Colman's Newry
1997	**St Patrick's Academy, Dungannon^{(2)}**	2-09	1-10	St Patrick's Grammar School, Armagh	Casement Park	Paul McGurk	Martin Earley; St Patrick's Academy
1996	St Patrick's College, Maghera^{(11)}	0-12	1-06	St Mary's Grammar School, Magherafelt	Coalisland	John Heaney	Niall Farren; St. Patrick's Maghera
1995	**St Patrick's College, Maghera^{(10)}**	1-15	0-05	St Colman's College, Newry	Clones	Seán Marty Lockhart	Adrian McGuckin; St. Patrick's Maghera
1994	St Patrick's College, Maghera^{(9)}	0-11	0-07	St Patrick's Grammar School, Armagh	Armagh	Ronan McGuckin	Sean McGuckin; St. Patrick's Maghera
1993	**St Colman's College, Newry^{(16)}**	0-10	1-05	St Patrick's College, Maghera	Omagh	Ronan Hamill	Ronan Hamill; St Colman's Newry
1992	St Michael's College, Enniskillen^{(2)}	1-08	0-09	St Patrick's Academy, Dungannon	Omagh	Declan O'Brien	
1991	St Patrick's Academy, Dungannon	2-07	1-09	St Colman's College, Newry	Omagh		
1990	**St Patrick's College, Maghera^{(8)}**	0-06; 3-06 (R)	0-06; 1-05 (R)	St Colman's College, Newry	Omagh; Omagh	Patrick McAllister	
1989	**St Patrick's College, Maghera^{(7)}**	4-10	4-09	St Colman's College, Newry	Omagh	Terry Bradley	
1988	**St Colman's College, Newry^{(15)}**	0-06; 2-07 (R); 3-05 (2R)	0-06; 2-07 (R); 1-09 (2R)	St. Patrick's College, Maghera	Ballybay; Omagh; Dungannon	Ollie Reel	
1987	Abbey CBS, Newry^{(4)}	2-06	0-08	St Colman's College, Newry	Lurgan	Tony McMahon	
1986	St Mary's CBS, Belfast^{(2)}	1-08	0-06	St Patrick's College, Maghera	Omagh	Conal Heatley	
1985	St Patrick's College, Maghera^{(6)}	2-09	1-01	St Michael's, Lurgan	Omagh	Danny Quinn	
1984	St Patrick's College, Maghera^{(5)}	1-09	0-06	St Mary's CBS, Belfast	Casement Park	Dermot McNicholl	
1983	St Patrick's College, Maghera^{(4)}	2-10	0-08	Abbey CBS, Newry	Casement Park	Dermot McNicholl	
1982	St Patrick's College, Maghera^{(3)}	1-07	1-06	Abbey CBS, Newry	Casement Park	Martin Tully	
1981	St Colman's College, Newry^{(14)}	1-03	0-05	St Patrick's College, Maghera	Casement Park	Greg Blaney	
1980	St Patrick's College, Maghera^{(2)}	3-09	3-06	Abbey CBS, Newry	Casement Park	Patrick Mackle	
1979	St Colman's College, Newry^{(13)}	0-07	0-05	St Patrick's College, Maghera	Casement Park	Peter Donnan	
1978	St Colman's College, Newry^{(12)}	1-10	1-03	St Patrick's College, Maghera	Casement Park		
1977	St Patrick's College, Maghera	1-07	0-08	Abbey CBS, Newry	Casement Park	Terence Laverty	
1976	St Colman's College, Newry^{(11)}	1-04	0-04	St. Patrick's College, Maghera	Dungannon	Jim McCartan	
1975	**St Colman's College, Newry^{(10)}**	2-07	1-08	St Patrick's College, Cavan	Omagh	Declan Rodgers	
1974	Omagh CBS	0-06; 1-11 (R)	0-06; 0-12 (R)	St Michael's College, Enniskillen	Dungannon; Lisnaskea	Colm McAleer	
1973	St Michael's College, Enniskillen	1-10	0-10	Omagh CBS	Dungannon	Hugh O'Neill	
1972	**St Patrick's College, Cavan^{(11)}**	1-10	2-05	Abbey CBS, Newry	Dundalk		
1971	**St Mary's CBS, Belfast**	1-11	1-07	Abbey CBS	Lurgan	Gerry McHugh	
1970	St Malachy's, Belfast^{(2)}	2-06	0-06	St Michael's College, Enniskillen	Omagh		
1969	St Colman's College, Newry^{(9)}	1-09	1-06	St Michael's College, Enniskillen	Omagh		
1968	St Colman's College, Newry^{(8)}	6-04	1-03	St Michael's College, Enniskillen	Dungannon		
1967	**St Colman's College, Newry^{(7)}**	2-10	1-04	St Patrick's Grammar School, Armagh	Dundalk	Noel Moore	
1966	St Columb's, Derry^{(2)}	3-05	3-03	St Patrick's, Downpatrick	Dungannon		
1965	**St Columb's, Derry**	1-03	0-04	St Michael's College, Enniskillen	Dungannon	Paddy McCotter	
1964	Abbey CBS^{(3)}	3-08	2-05	St Patrick's College, Cavan	Carrickmacross	Val Kane	
1963	St Colman's College, Newry^{(6)}	2-08	0-02	St Patrick's College, Cavan	Ballybay	L Powell	
1962	St Patrick's College, Cavan^{(10)}	2-11	2-07	Abbey CBS	Ballybay		
1961	St Patrick's College, Cavan^{(9)}	1-13	0-05	St Eunan's, Letterkenny	Irvinestown		
1960	St Colman's College, Newry^{(5)}	2-06	0-04	St Patrick's College, Cavan	Castleblaney		
1959	Abbey CBS^{(2)}	3-07	1-03	St Eunan's, Letterkenny	Omagh		
1958	St Colman's College, Newry^{(4)}	4-11	1-01	St Patrick's College, Cavan	Castleblaney		
1957	St Colman's College, Newry^{(3)}	0-08	1-02	St Patrick's Grammar School, Armagh	Lurgan		
1956	St Macartan's College, Monaghan^{(9)}	2-07	2-06	St Eunan's, Letterkenny	Omagh		
1955	St Patrick's College, Cavan^{(8)}	2-08	0-02	St Malachy's, Belfast	Armagh		
1954	Abbey CBS ^{(1)}	0-05 0-11 (R)	1-03 1-05 (R)	St Patrick's College, Cavan	Armagh Ballybay	Gerry Butterfield	
1953	St Patrick's Grammar School, Armagh^{(13)}	2-10	0-06	St Macartan's College, Monaghan	Ballybay	Patsy Kieran	
1952	St Macartan's College, Monaghan^{(8)}	2-08	1-04	St Patrick's Grammar School, Armagh	Ballybay		
1951	St Patrick's College, Cavan^{(7)}	1-11	2-02	St Patrick's Grammar School, Armagh	Ballybay		
1950	St Colman's College, Newry^{(2)}	2-11	3-07	St Patrick's Grammar School, Armagh	Lurgan	Sean Blaney	
1949	St Colman's College, Newry	5-11	0-07	St. Malachy's, Belfast	Lurgan	Sean Blaney	
1948	St Patrick's College, Cavan^{(6)}	7-08	1-07	St Malachy's, Belfast	Breffni Park		
1947	St Patrick's Grammar School, Armagh^{(12)}	5-11	0-02	Abbey CBS	Newry		
1946	**St Patrick's Grammar School, Armagh^{(11)}**	4-09	0-03	St Mary's College, Dundalk	Armagh		
1945	St Patrick's Grammar School, Armagh^{(10)}	4-09	0-12	St Colman's College, Newry	Newry		
1944	St Patrick's Grammar School, Armagh^{(9)}	5-11	0-02	Abbey CBS	Newry		
1943	St Patrick's College, Cavan^{(5)}	2-13	1-03	St Patrick's Grammar School, Armagh	Armagh		
1942	St Macartan's College, Monaghan^{(7)}	3-05	2-05	St Patrick's College, Cavan	Monaghan; Inniskeen		
1941	St Mary's College, Dundalk^{(2)}	7-06	3-05	St Patrick's College, Cavan	Dundalk		
1940	St Macartan's College, Monaghan^{(6)}	3-05	2-05	St Mary's College, Dundalk	Inniskeen		
1939	St Patrick's College, Cavan^{(4)}	2-07	1-01	St Mary's College, Dundalk	Breffni Park		
1938	St Mary's College, Dundalk	4-06	0-04	St Patrick's Grammar School, Armagh	Dundalk	Aidan Goulding	
1937	St Patrick's College, Cavan^{(3)}	2-06	1-06	St Mary's College, Dundalk	Breffni Park		
1936	St Patrick's College, Cavan^{(2)}	3-03	1-07	St Patrick's Grammar School, Armagh	Monaghan		
1935	St Patrick's College, Cavan	7-11	0-00	Monaghan CBS	Breffni Park	T Canning	
=== League Format 1923 - 1934 ===
Year	Winner						
1934	St Macartan's College, Monaghan^{(5)}						
1933	St Macartan's College, Monaghan^{(4)}						
1932	St Macartan's College, Monaghan^{(3)}						
1931	St Patrick's Grammar School, Armagh^{(8)}						
1930	St Macartan's College, Monaghan^{(2)}						
1929	St Patrick's Grammar School, Armagh^{(7)}						
1928	St Patrick's Grammar School, Armagh^{(6)}						
1927	St Patrick's Grammar School, Armagh^{(5)}						
1926	St Patrick's Grammar School, Armagh^{(4)}						
1925	St Patrick's Grammar School, Armagh^{(3)} St Macartan's College, Monaghan ^{(1)} St Malachy's, Belfast ^{(1)}						
1924	St Patrick's Grammar School, Armagh^{(2)}						
1923	St Patrick's Grammar School, Armagh^{(1)}						

- The Iggy Jones Man of the Match trophy has only been awarded to players on the losing side on three occasions. Martin Clarke and Joe Ireland for St Louis, Kilkeel in consecutive finals, and Colm Greenan for St Macartan's Monaghan.
- St Patrick's College, Maghera made their final debut in 1976, and then went on to feature in every final until 1986. They won 6 and lost 5 of those finals.
- St Colman's College, Newry and St Patrick's College, Maghera dominated the competition between 1975 and 1991, with at least one of the schools featuring in the final. The schools won 14 titles in 17 years, including every title between 1975 and 1985.
- St Patrick's College, Maghera didn't win a final against their illustrious rivals until 1989. St Colman's College, Newry won the first 5 finals ('76, '78,'79, '81, and '88) between the two sides.
- Between 1988 and 1990 St. Patrick's College, Maghera and St Colman's College, Newry played 6 MacRory finals. The 1988 final went to a second replay and the 1990 final went to a replay
- The MacRory Cup had first time winners in 2017 St. Mary's Grammar School, Magherafelt and 2018 St Ronan's Lurgan. Prior to that the competition did not have a first time winner since St. Patrick's Academy, Dungannon's victory in 1991
- St Patrick's Grammar School, Armagh(1950–52), St Michael's College, Enniskillen (1968-70) and St Colman's College, Newry (1989–91) are the only schools to have lost 3 consecutive finals.

== Longest winning streaks ==
- St Patrick's Grammar School, Armagh won 7 consecutive MacRory Cups (One Shared), when the winners were decided on a league basis.

Team	Streak	Years
St Patrick's Grammar School, Armagh	4	1944–1947
St Patrick's College, Maghera	4	1982–1985
St Patrick's College, Cavan	3	1935–1937
St Colman's College, Newry	3	1967–1969
St Patrick's College, Maghera	3	1994–1996

== Most common finals ==
Finals	Finals	Years
St Patrick's College, Maghera v St Colman's College, Newry	11	1976, 1978, 1979, 1981, 1988, 1989, 1990, 1993, 1995, 1998, 2020
St Michael's College, Enniskillen v Omagh Christian Brothers Grammar School	5	2019, 2002, 2001, 1974, 1973
St Patrick's College, Maghera v Abbey Christian Brothers Grammar School, Newry	4	1983, 1982, 1980, 1977
St Colman's College, Newry v St Patrick's College, Cavan	4	1975, 1963, 1960, 1958
St Colman's College, Newry v St Patrick's Grammar School, Armagh	4	1967, 1957, 1950, 1945

== Longest gap between title victories ==
Team	Years	Difference
St Patrick's Grammar School, Armagh	1953-2000	47 years
St Patrick's College, Cavan	1972-2015	43 years
Omagh Christian Brothers Grammar School	1974-2001	27 years
Abbey Christian Brothers Grammar School, Newry	1987-2006	19 years
Abbey Christian Brothers Grammar School, Newry	2006-2026	20 years

== Noted footballers / College All Stars ==
In 2000 a Millennium team was selected by the participating schools as a best team 1988–2000.
1. Jonathon Kelly
2. Paddy McGuinness
3. Seán Marty Lockhart - Won consecutive MacRory Cups with St Patrick's College, Maghera
4. Fergal P. McCusker
5. Tony McEntee
6. Kieran McGeeney
7. Karl Diamond - Won consecutive MacRory & Hogan Cups with St Patrick's College, Maghera
8. Paul Brewster
9. Paul McGrane
10. Éamonn Burns - Won consecutive MacRory & Hogan Cups with St Patrick's College, Maghera
11. John Duffy
12. Paddy McKeever
13. Raymond Gallagher
14. James McCartan Jr. - Won MacRory and Hogan Cups with St Colman's College, Newry
15. Oisín McConville played for St Patrick's Grammar School, Armagh.
Other notable players include:

- Dermot McNicholl played in five MacRory Cup finals in the early 1980s with St. Patrick's College, Maghera. Winning four titles and was twice the victorious captain.
- Martin Clarke produced a number of memorable displays in 2005 and captained his school St Louis, Kilkeel in 2006.
- Michael Murphy played for St Eunan's College, reaching the 2008 semi-final.
- Tony McEntee of Abbey CBS, Newry (1994, 1995, 1996) and Lee Brennan of St Michael's College, Enniskillen (2013, 2014, 2015) are the only three-time Ulster Schools All-Stars. Brennan was also a member of St Michael's 2012 MacRory Cup winning team.

== See also ==
Schools' Senior A Football

- Hogan Cup (All-Ireland Championship)
- Aonghus Murphy Memorial Cup (Connacht Championship)
- Brother Bosco Cup (Leinster Championship)
- Corn Uí Mhuirí (Munster Championship)

Schools' Senior A Hurling

- Dr Croke Cup (All-Ireland Championship)
- Leinster Championship
- Dr Harty Cup (Munster Championship)

Schools' Senior B Hurling

- Mageean Cup (Ulster Championship)
