= East Village, London =

Area of Stratford, London, England

Coordinates: 51.547375°N 0.009656°W

East Village
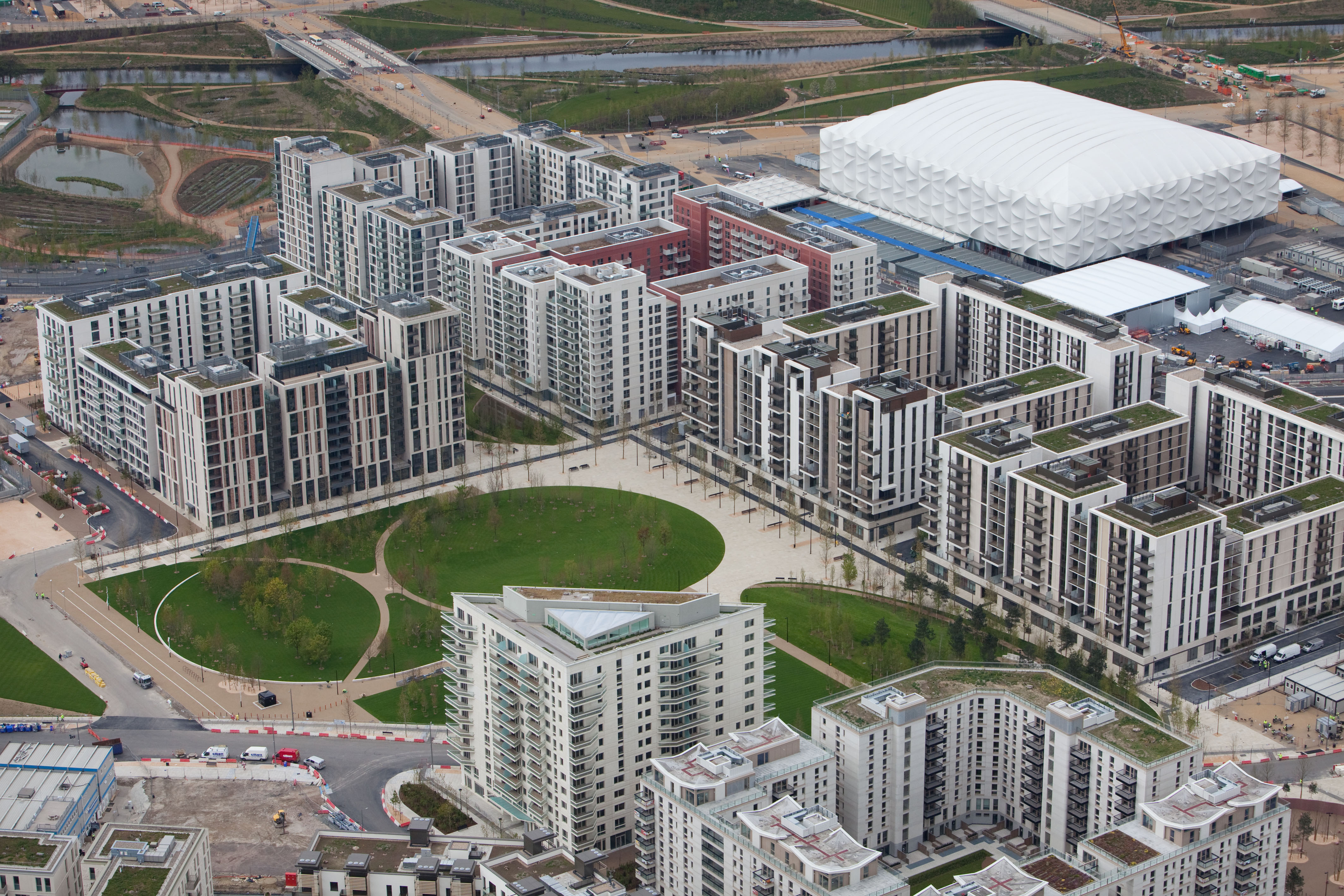
- Olympic and Paralympic Village, April 2012. To the rear is the temporary Basketball Arena

- Location within Greater London
- OS grid reference: TQ385845
  - Charing Cross: 6 mi (9.7 km) WSW
- London borough: Newham
- Ceremonial county: Greater London
- Region: London
- Country: England
- Sovereign state: United Kingdom
- Post town: LONDON
- Postcode district: E20
- Dialling code: 020
- Police: Metropolitan
- Fire: London
- Ambulance: London
- UK Parliament: Stratford and Bow
- London Assembly: City and East

East Village is an area in Stratford, East London that was designed and constructed as the Olympic Village of the 2012 Summer Olympics and has been converted for use as a new residential district, complete with independent shops, bars and restaurants. The area was formerly contaminated waste land and industrial buildings to the north of Stratford town centre. More than 7,000 people now live in the area.

The district is part of the Queen Elizabeth Olympic Park, planning is overseen by London Legacy Development Corporation.

== History ==
=== Planning and construction ===
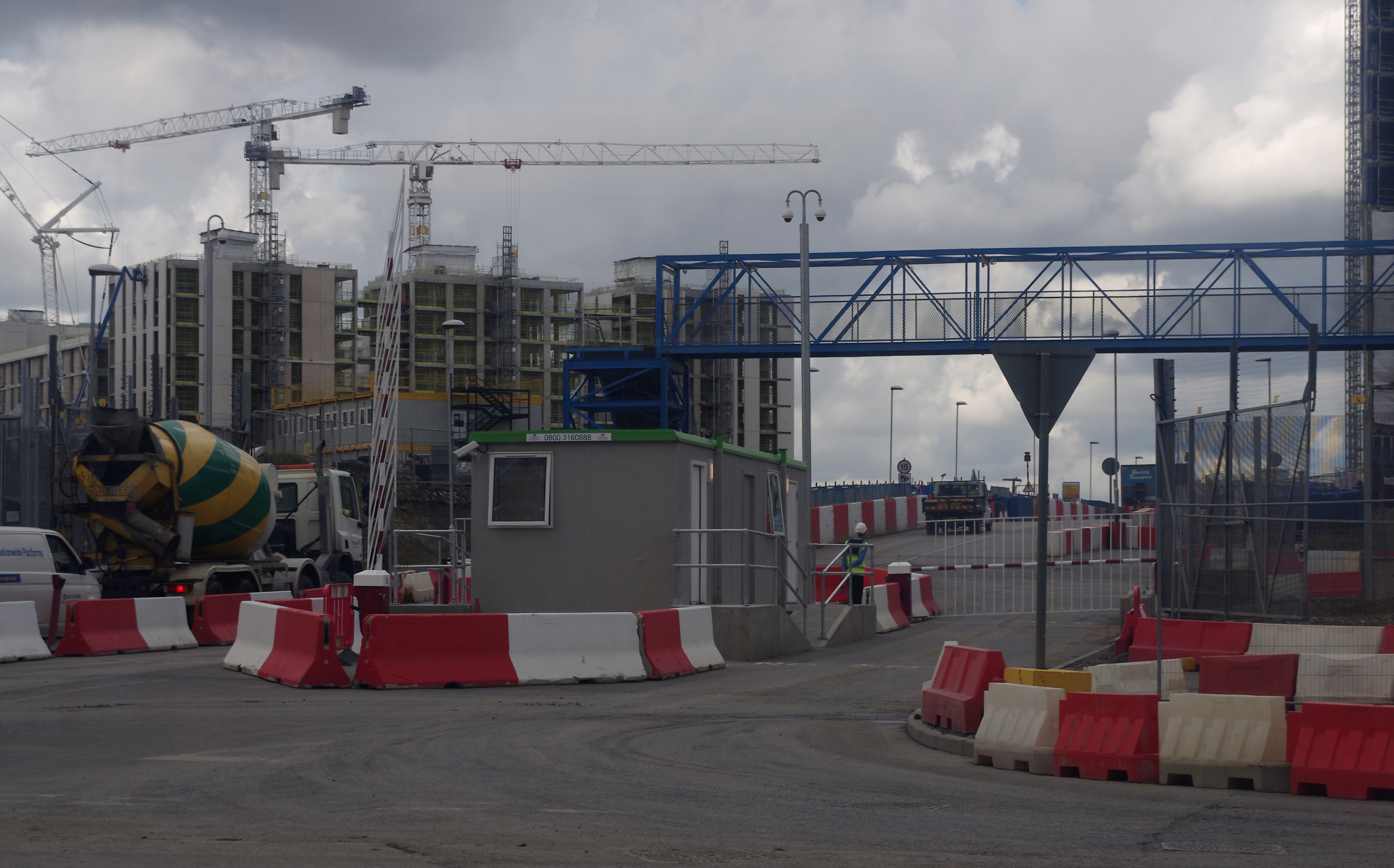
Olympic Village during construction, September 2010

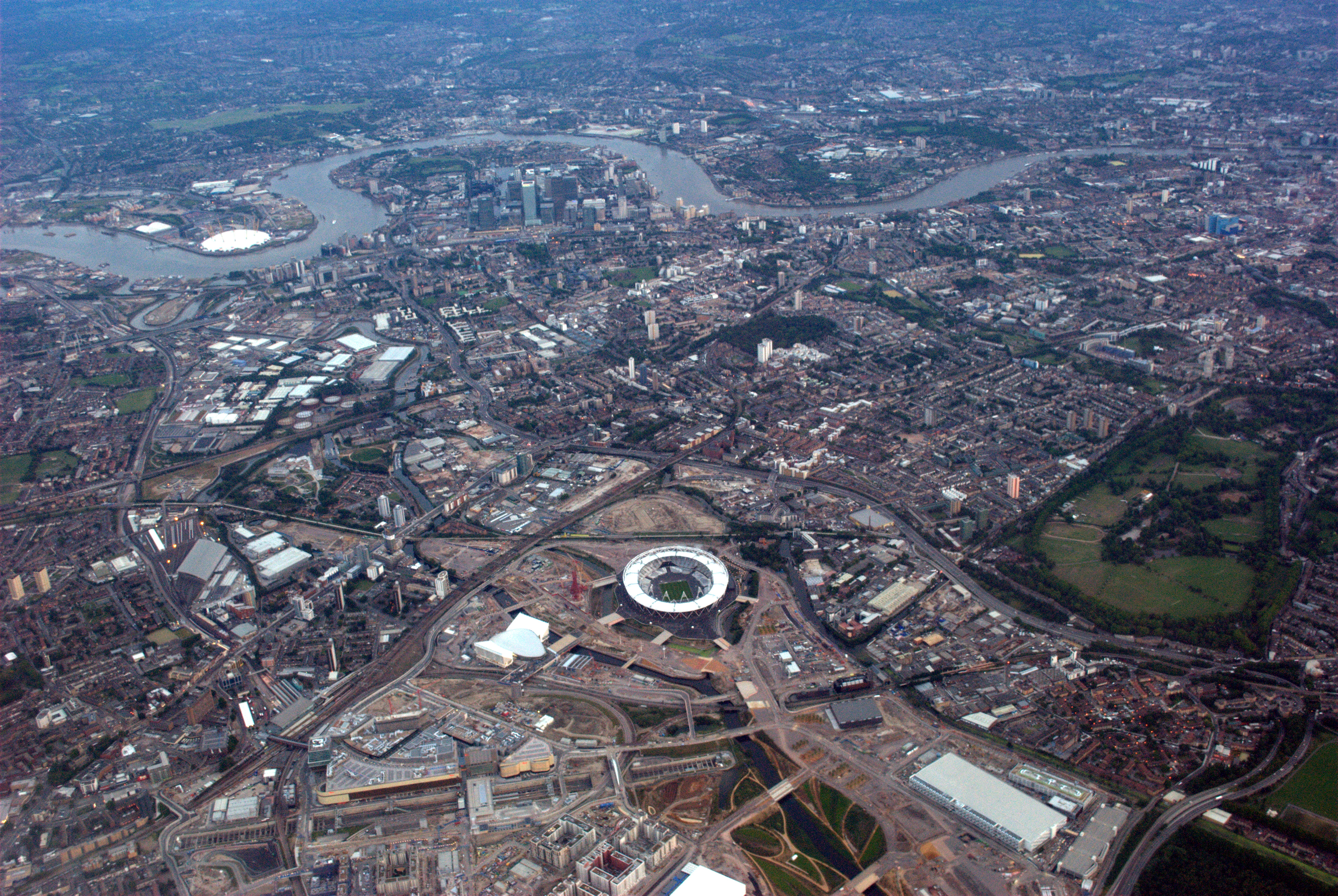
Aerial overview of the Olympic Park south towards the River Thames, during construction in April 2011. With the Olympic Stadium in the centre of picture, the Olympic Village is at the bottom, centre

As part of the regeneration programme within the bid for the 2012 Summer Olympics, the Olympic Village design to house the athletes was based on reusing the buildings after the games as a new residential district for Stratford. The basis for the residential plan was taken from the SCDC regeneration plan for the area as a consequence of the creation of the London-Paris high-speed link. The spoil from the tunnel which went underground at Stratford created the platform on which Westfield Shopping Centre and the Olympic Village were created. Through a competitive bidding process, the then Labour British government chose a proposal by Lend Lease which covered financing and construction of both the Olympic Village and part of the London Olympics Media Centre. This would both provide accommodation for 22,500 athletes and team officials, 16,000 as Olympic and 6,500 as Paralympic built to Life Time Home standards to support the Paralympic residents and future residents with impairments or other physical challenges:afterwards provide a mix of low-cost and private residential housing, within a community that would comprise offices, shops, schools and a health centre.

Cilantro Engineering were appointed to work as part of a collaborative team to deliver Design and Build MEP Installations for the main contractor, Lendlease.

Lend Lease engaged a team of: architects Fletcher Priest; structural engineers Arup; and urban planning/landscape architecture firm West 8 and Vogt Landscape. They were briefed to design a village-garden type district to fit in with the wider urban park vision of the Olympic Park legacy, emulating the classical Victorian architecture layout of Maida Vale and other parts of Victorian west London. On a 27 hectares (67 acres) site, the plan provided for 14 residential plots, each made up of 5 to 7 blocks, built around communal squares and courtyards, with water features accentuating the closeness of the River Lea. Each of the 69 blocks is of between 8 and 12 storeys high, nominally laid out: Street level of mostly three-storey townhouses, with front doors on street level to create an "active frontage". These are supplemented by a mix of single to three-storey shops and offices. Floor 3 and above in the centre of the complex are communal raised gardens, which hide carparks beneath. At and above this level are a mix of low-cost and private residential apartments, ranging from studio to five bedrooms. Each apartment provides generous floor spacing, and each includes its own balcony that is big enough for a table and chairs.

The whole Olympic Park site was proposed to be secured under a Compulsory Purchase Order (CPO) by the London Development Agency. In late 2005, a row broke out between then Mayor of London Ken Livingstone and Newham Council/Westfield Group over the use of the legal instrument. The site for the Olympic Village was to be located next to the £4Bn development of Stratford City, but access difficulties meant that the Olympic Park CPO extended onto the site for Stratford City. In November 2005, an agreement was made whereby the CPO over the Westfield site was removed, subject to agreed access provisions to the Olympic Village.

In light of the 2008 financial crisis, Lend Lease found difficulties in raising funds on the commercial markets for the construction of the village, the single largest project in the 2012 Summer Olympics scheme. The government via the Olympic Delivery Authority (ODA) hence agreed to underwrite a greater part of the required sum, and a scale-back of the project scale by 25%, on the proviso that athletes competing in non-London based events would be housed locally to their competition, that three of the plots would be deferred until the post-Games period, plots 5,6 & 8. This did not solve the challenge of providing Games time bed numbers. A Games design plan was created which introduced temporary walls within the legacy design to create more bed spaces: thus a 2-bed space, single-bedroom apartment became 4; a four-bed apartment, 2 bedrooms became 6 and six-bed apartment became 8 mainly by dividing the open plan lounge, dining and kitchen areas. Everything was retrofitted back to the original concept after the Games. Only the town houses over three levels were not subject to this Games time modification but still increased bed spaces from legacy 6 to 8 by use of the separate lounge. Following the athletes' experiences in Beijing 2008, and in particular through comments concerning athletes' welfare by International Olympic Committee President Jacques Rogge, this compromise was to be reconsidered whilst pressure built for the finance deal to be resolved.

Up until this point, the proposed site had been a mix of former industrial buildings and contaminated waste land. The proposed site for the village provided two living camp sites for Irish Travellers, one on Clays Lane, Newham, and a second on Waterden Crescent, Hackney. The final part of the Olympic CPO covering the village site, secured in December 2006, was unsuccessfully challenged by the travellers in the High Court in May 2007. Towards the end of demolition/site clearance, on 12 November 2007, a fire broke out in an old industrial warehouse on Waterden Road, Hackney Wick, on the western edge of the proposed Olympic Village site. With flames of 50 feet (15 m) in height engulfing the building and sending clouds of acrid black smoke over the city centre, it took 75 firefighters from the London Fire Brigade to bring the fire under control.

=== Olympic and Paralympic village ===
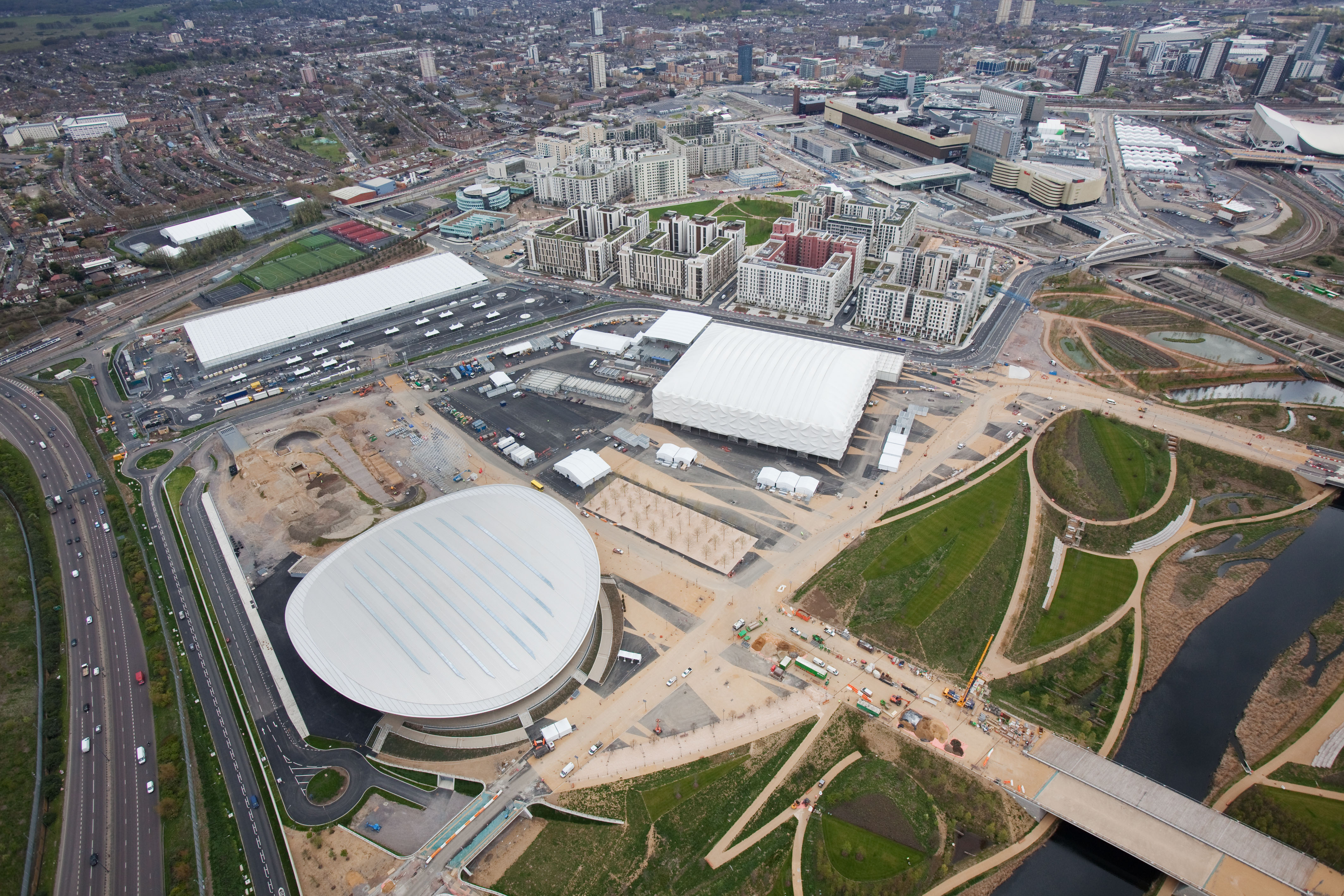
View looking towards the Olympic and Paralympic Village, April 2012. In the foreground is the London Velopark, followed by the Basketball Arena and then the Village. To the top right is the London Aquatics Centre, to the right of which (out of shot) is the Olympic Stadium.

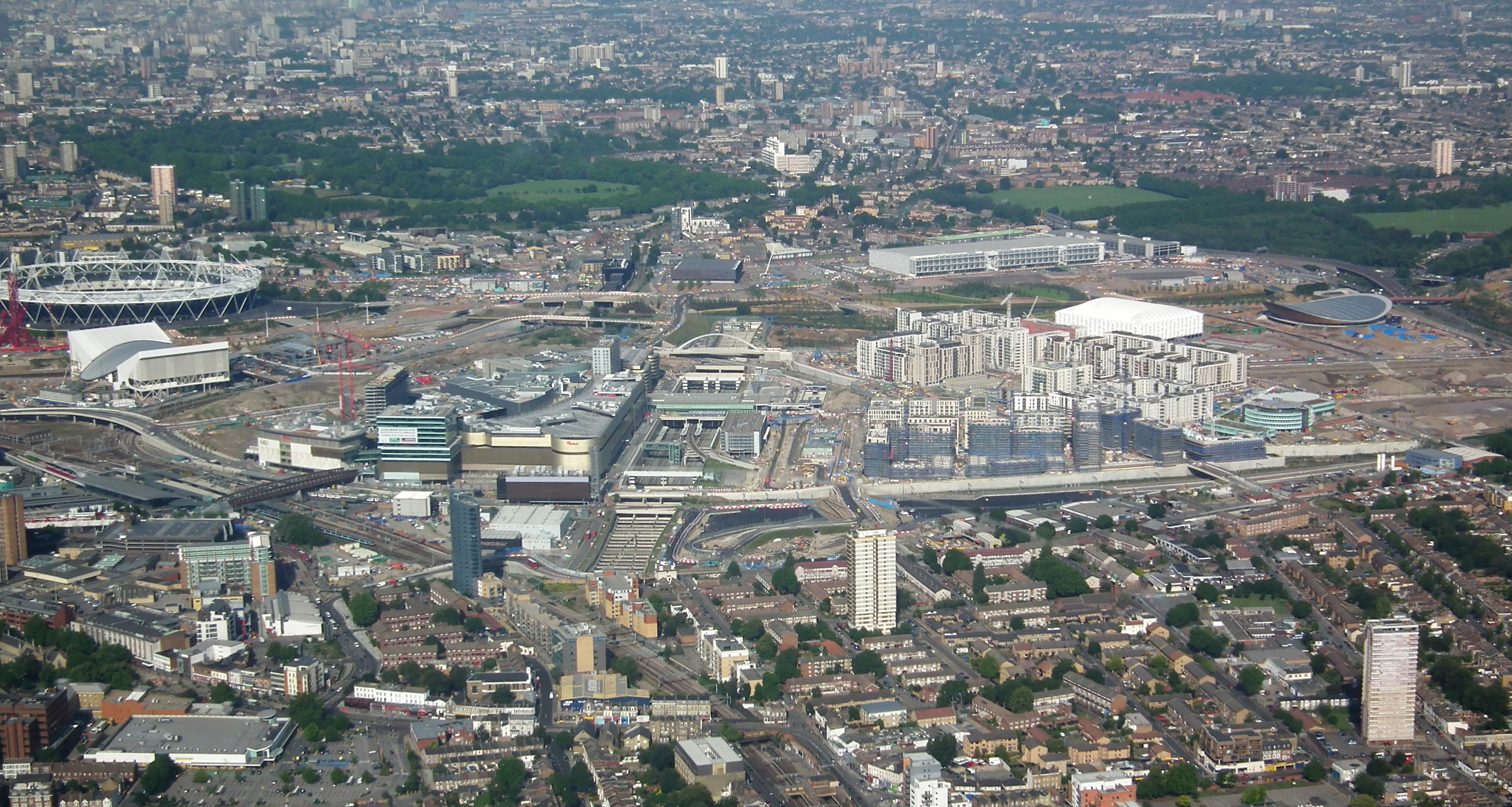
View towards Stratford City/Olympic Village, June 2011. In the centre is Stratford International station. To its immediate left is Stratford City, to its immediate right the under construction Olympic Village. To the rear are various buildings of the Olympic Park, raging from (far left) the Olympic Stadium, to (far right) the London Olympics Media Centre

During the summer of 2012, the first use for the blocks was as the Olympic Village for the 2012 Summer Olympics. Taking the original design, the architects added temporary partitioning to create "hotel" style apartments catering for: 3,300 apartments: each to have a TV, internet access, and a private courtyard; and 17,320 beds (this is around 17,000 for athletes ~ 10903 (total number of them) and rest for officials during the Games): providing each athlete with 16 square metres (170 sq ft) floor space. In addition, the developers added two temporary buildings: a 17,000 square metres (180,000 sq ft) food hall, which was open 24 hours a day, capable of catering for 5,500 athletes at a time; and an entertainment hall of 10,000 square metres (110,000 sq ft), providing Video games for the athletes use and a communal rest space, plus a non-alcoholic bar. The village also included a plaza, where athletes were able to meet with friends and family during the games.

There is a full list of the buildings and the athletes that stayed in them during the 2012 Olympics, and plaques in all East Village building foyers mark which countries stayed there. For example, the British team stayed in Calla House, Kotata House and Tayberry House; Greece in Hopground House; Spain in Carina House; Ukraine in Emperor House; Japan in Applegate House; Armenia, Peru and Slovenia in Calico House; Belgium, Cape Verde and Kyrgyzstan in Frye House; Costa Rica and Yemen in Galena House; and the Netherlands in Heinieken House.

=== After the Games ===
After the conclusion of the games, the Olympic housing was adapted to create a new residential quarter to be known as East Village. The new construction created 2,818 new homes, including 1,379 affordable homes and houses, for sale and rent. The wider community is planned with wide vistas filled with gardens, parks and communal areas, within which are to be housed a school, a health clinic and shops. Having sold the affordable homes to Triathlon Homes in 2009 for £268 million, a competitive tender was issued in 2008 for ODA's interests in the remaining 1,439 private homes, along with six adjacent future development plots with the potential for a further 2,000 new homes, and long-term management of East Village.

The ODA received three bids: a joint-venture between Jamie Ritblat's Delancey and Qatari Diar; Hutchison Whampoa; and Wellcome Trust, who bid to take over all the 2.5 square kilometres (0.97 sq mi) Olympic park. In August 2011, the ODA announced an agreement with Delancey/Qatari Diar, who paid £557 million for the East Village site, representing an estimated £275 million loss to the ODA and hence the British taxpayer. Culture Secretary Jeremy Hunt commented that the ODA never expected to recoup building costs: "It was an entirely empty site, it didn't have any infrastructure, roads or parks. There was always going to be a public sector contribution to help put those in."

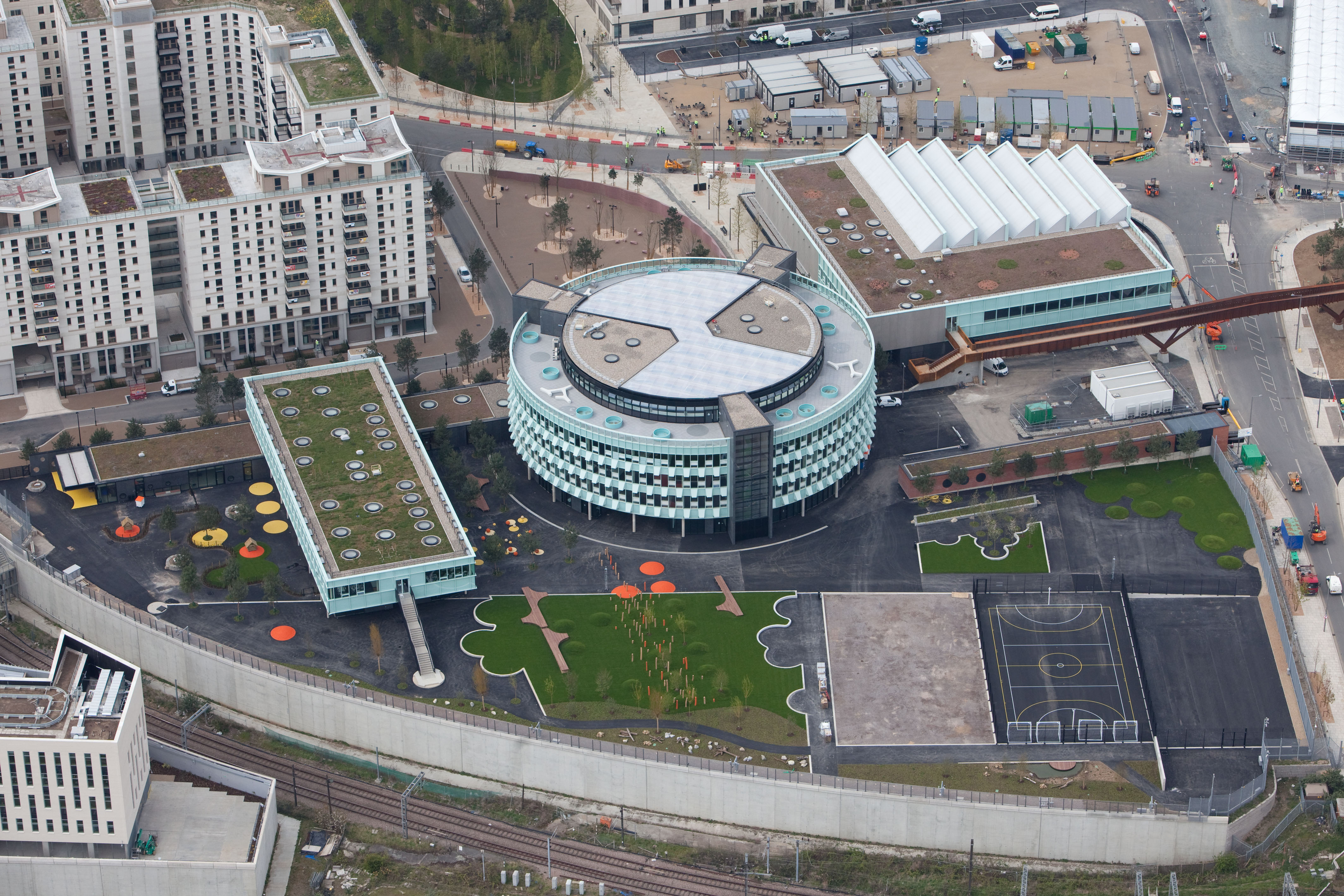
Chobham Academy in April 2012

Temporary partitions installed during the games are being removed to create a range of one to five-bed homes, ranging from apartments to townhouses. The hotel style designed rooms were converted to include kitchens. 1,439 private homes are let on a rental basis, instead of being sold, with the ownership remaining with Delancey/Qatari Diar and managed by Get Living London. This created the first UK private sector residential fund of over 1,000 homes to be owned and directly managed as an investment. In addition, the developers created new parklands and additional transport links. A health centre for residents of East Village and the surrounding areas has also been constructed. Independent retailers have been brought in to East Village, which is now a neighbourhood in its own right. In 2023, permission was granted to build a further 848 rental homes and 504 student beds, responding to rising demand from private tenants and students at new campuses of universities including University College London and University of the Arts London.

The developers also added Chobham Academy, a new education campus with 1,800 places for students aged 3–19. During the Olympics, the school building was used as the main base for organising and managing teams. Rebuilt after the games, it opened in September 2013 as Chobham Academy, home to an education campus, comprising nursery, primary and secondary schools; an adult learning facility; and a community arts complex. In July 2015 Chobham Academy was rated 'Outstanding' by OFSTED.

=== Ownership and Management ===
The original developer was Stratford Village Development Partnership Limited (SVDP). In 2009, East Village Management Limited (EVML) was set up as a joint venture between Triathlon and SVDP to manage the East Village. Each partner had 39% and 58% voting rights, respectively. In 2018, Get Living purchased SVDP. East Village's overall manager is Get Living PLC, a subsidiary of the British property and real estate development company Delancey with £2.6 billion in assets. The freehold for the East Village, however, is held by two separate companies - SVPH1 and SVPH2 - in a trust for SVDP, and a headlease to EVML is divided into longer leases to Triathlon and Get Living. Triathlon Homes, a joint venture between housing associations London & Quadrant and Southern Housing Group and urban development and investment company First Base, manages the social and affordable rent homes.

In addition to Council tax, Triathlon residents pay service charges. Leaseholders have reported that these high fees (such as £400/month) have made selling their homes difficult.

== Fire Safety Issues and Remediation ==
After the 2017 Grenfell Tower Fire, inspections carried out on buildings in the East Village found that 63 of the buildings, containing 2,818 flats, had serious fire safety issues. These included aluminum-composite material as cladding and flammable materials used in the interior of buildings. Other buildings that didn't have the cladding were still found to be seriously lacking in fire safety measures and required 24-hour "waking watches," and new sprinkler and alarm systems. 2012 legal disputes between contractors and subcontractors suggested that the rushed construction timeline driven by the Olympic games led to shoddy workmanship, dangerous health and safety conditions, and lack of proper oversight and management.

The costs of remediation led to extensive legal disputes. While the East Village's management company, East Village Management Limited (EVML), initially estimated the costs £18 million, that figure was then amended to over £95 million in 2023, then £432 million in 2024. Triathlon Homes, which manages about 1,400 affordable and social housing within the East Village, and Get Living were also in dispute over who should cover the costs.

In January 2024, a court ruled in favour of Triathlon Homes against Stratford Village Development Partnership and Get Living, ordering them to pay £18 million towards remediation for 5 buildings on one plot (N26). SVDP and Get Living's appeals were unsuccessful. In 2025, a court found that under the Building Safety Act 2022, the building owners could not pass the costs of remediation onto leaseholders. That same year, the head of Get Living PLC said that it was taking legal action against the state-appointed architects and 22 contractors who designed and built the complex, and as of 2025 had filed at least 50 claims.

Remediations began in 2020. Without updated fire certifications, the issues have left tenants and private homeowners in a "limbo" unable to sell, or to sell their homes a loss, sometimes forcing them to become "unwilling landlords."

== Transport ==
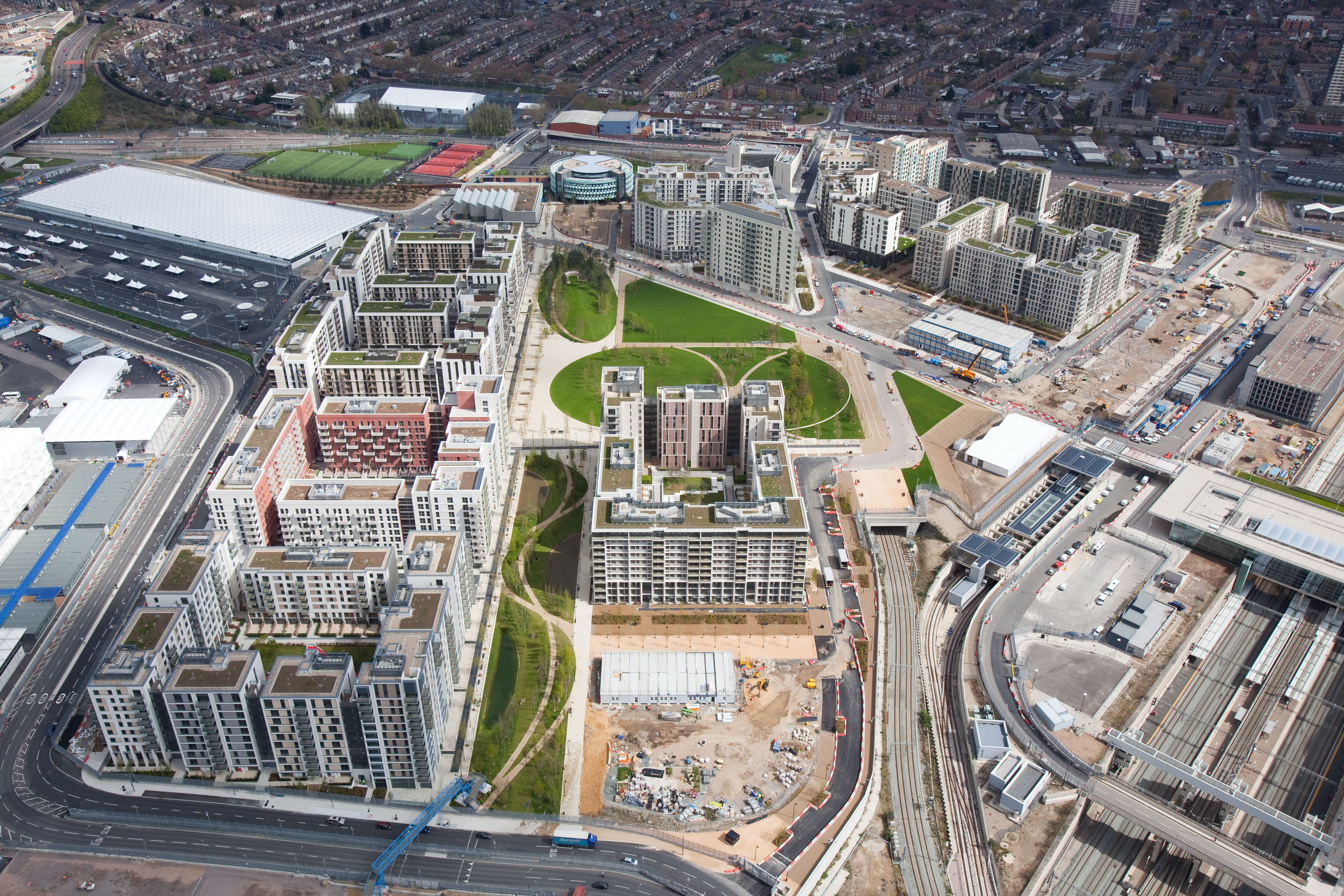
Olympic and Paralympic Village, April 2012. To the right is the Stratford International station.

East Village is located at Stratford International station with fast services to central London (in 5–6 minutes) via High Speed One, on Southeastern trains, but not Eurostar, whose trains do not stop at Stratford International station. The Docklands Light Railway gives direct access to much of the east of London, and is one stop from Stratford station, which itself gives access to the Great Eastern Main Line (services operated by Greater Anglia and Elizabeth line, c2c services (weekends only), the North London line (services operated by London Overground) and the London Underground Jubilee and Central lines.

London Bus routes 97, 108, 308 and 339 and night route N205 serve East Village. Also, route D8 stops nearby at Stratford International and routes 58, 69 and 158 stops nearby on Leyton High Road along with route 97.

Generally, walking distance from Big Ben is about 10 km (6 mi). At the time of the Olympics Stratford and Stratford International Stations were located in London fare zone 3. During the Olympics, for every competition day there an all-zones free travel day card. As of January 2016 Stratford station and Stratford International station have been moved to Zone 2/3.

== Sustainability ==
Residential accommodation was designed to achieve Code for Sustainable Homes Level 4 on 8 September 2012.

Plot N25, car park for Stratford International Station achieved CEEQUAL Excellent on 8 September 2012.

Permanent and temporary timber used was externally verified and audited and the project achieved Full Project FSC certification (2009: TT-PRO-002826) on 31 January 2012.

In construction the project achieved three Gold awards from the Considerate Constructors Scheme in 2010, 2011 and 2012, project registration references: 32454,36861 and 46760.

== See also ==
- Venues of the 2012 Summer Olympics and Paralympics
- London 2012 Olympic Legacy
- List of Olympic Villages
