= Schools' Challenge =

British school general knowledge competition

- Industry: Quiz
- Founded: 1977 in Marlborough, Wiltshire
- Headquarters: United Kingdom
- Key people: Robert and Allison Grant (Organisers 2022–); Ben Mooney (Co-Organiser 2022–23); Sue and Paul Sims (Organisers 1985–2022); Colin Galloway (Founder and Organiser 1977–85)
- Services: Tournament organisation, question writing
- Owners: Robert and Allison Grant

Schools' Challenge is the primary national general knowledge competition for schools in the United Kingdom, founded by Colin Galloway in 1977 and currently overseen by Robert and Allison Grant. Intentionally based on University Challenge, it has a notable resemblance to quizbowl competitions in its question content and format. Schools' Challenge is currently divided into Senior, Intermediate and Junior competition sections, which take place annually: Colchester Royal Grammar School, King Edward's School, Birmingham, and The Perse School are the current Senior, Intermediate, and Junior champions respectively.

== History ==
=== Early years (1977–1985) ===
Schools' Challenge was originally set up by Marlborough College teacher Colin Galloway in 1977 as a schools' version of University Challenge, conforming to the same rules- only split into separate Junior and Senior divisions, with 'juniors' being from prep school years and 'seniors' being from Year 9 to Year 13. With questions written in-house and then mailed to local coordinators who would organise regional tournaments to supply a national final competition (and who would also receive a percentage of the profits in exchange for their services), Schools' Challenge soon spread quickly across the UK. It capitalised on the dearth of widespread extracurricular activities in the country at the time, and its popularity grew beyond its roots: although originally involving only private schools like Marlborough, it saw its first champion from a state school in 1983 in the Senior division in the form of King Henry VIII School, Abergavenny.

=== Classic era (1985–2020) ===
In 1985, Schools' Challenge was taken over by Sue and Paul Sims, who would run the competition for the next thirty-seven years and become its best-known figures in the process. Under their stewardship, the competition would grow to over three hundred participants, and a number of rules still in place today were established. Bonus rounds were changed from being worth five points apiece to worth ten points, a 'plate' repechage competition would be made available for losing national quarter-finalists, a limit of two older (Year 11 and above) students per team was applied to the Senior competition and Schools' Challenge would become reliably divided into the sixteen regions that would send schools to the eight-team National Finals every year.

The 21st century would see the first team from outside Great Britain win in 2002 in Abbey Christian Brothers' Grammar School, and the rise of a clutch of elite schools who would come to dominate Schools' Challenge in the years to come: between 2003 and 2012 only three schools would win the Senior championship (most notably, prestigious Westminster winning an unprecedented five times in a row between 2005 and 2009, as well as Lancaster Royal Grammar School winning 3 titles within 4 years) and between 2011 and 2020, The Perse School would win the Junior championship seven times out of nine. This emergence of dominant schools coincided with a growing industry of time and money around Schools' Challenge, with schools collecting decades' worth of question sets, buzzer sets for practice being increasingly imported at substantial cost from abroad and one company, Jaser Electronics, even becoming a bespoke supplier of buzzer equipment for ambitious teams before dissolving in 2017. Some have argued these changes benefited wealthy schools such as Westminster or the Perse, who were able to capitalise on the increasing opportunities and recognition Schools' Challenge came to enjoy, while some have argued their success was instead due to a general stagnation of competition growth to other schools in later years leading to the entrenchment of an 'elite' group of successful teams.

=== Modern era (2020–) ===
==== Pandemic and its fallout (2020–22) ====
The COVID-19 pandemic would lead to substantial adaptations for Schools' Challenge. The 2019–20 Schools' Challenge year would be curtailed, with the usual inter-regional round of sixteen teams turned into a 15-minute rapid quiz before the National Finals became the first (and only ever) to be held on Zoom, with Westminster School and The Perse School triumphing in the shortened Senior and Junior competitions. The continuing pandemic would furthermore lead to the complete cancellation of the 2020–21 season, before Sue and Paul Sims returned for a final year. Their retirement in 2022 would mean only the third ever directorial change.

==== Ben Mooney and Robert Grant (2022–23) ====
After a substantial period of uncertainty, Ben Mooney, head of Northern Ireland-based BM Quizzing partnered with former regional organiser Robert Grant to acquire the properties of Schools' Challenge from Sue and Paul Sims in November 2022, before formally re-launching the competition in January 2023. With the old system of regional organisers and in-person hosts not revivable, Ben Mooney in particular oversaw a radical overhaul of Schools' Challenge- social media channels were set up, more popular culture questions were added to question sets and an all-new website (the first ever) in particular was designed to help modernise and expand a competition that had effectively not been in decades. With a now-shrunken field of less than a hundred schools despite the new acceptance of 'B' and 'C' teams, preliminary rounds were staged nationally online, and the Junior and Senior National Finals were then successfully played in June that year with the Perse School winning both tournaments.

==== Robert and Allison Grant (2023–) ====
However, Ben Mooney would leave Schools' Challenge that summer due to personal commitments, handing over sole control to Robert Grant with his wife Allison and marking a third management in three seasons. They are currently overseeing the 2023–24 season, having continued the online staging of preliminary rounds adopted the year before, with the latest National Finals underway during Spring 2024. Changes have continued, such as the introduction of the Shield to replace the Plate as the primary repechage competition (with the Plate created as a secondary repechage competition)^{[Note 2]} and the implementation of a three-tier age system by introducing an Intermediate section, removing the loophole allowing Junior players to play in the Senior competition in the process.

== Competition structure ==
Schools' Challenge is for students of secondary school age (11–18 years old in the UK), who make up teams of four players each. Senior Schools' Challenge is open to students in their last three possible years of secondary school (ages 15–18), with a maximum of two students in their final year of school per team of four to both curtail the potential dominance of the oldest students and limit the disadvantage of schools which may lack sixth forms. Intermediate Schools' Challenge is open to students in their middle two years (ages 13–15), and Junior Schools' Challenge is open to students in their first two years of secondary school (ages 11–13). Schools currently pay an annual rate to enter teams into these competitions, with the maximum rate being £100 for two teams in each section.

The competition is divided this way, in part, because of the incongruence between the private school system and grammar/comprehensive schools' systems, where the last two years of preparatory school align with the first two years of usual secondary school- with the historical and current predominance of private schools in the competition, this allowance is more important than it would be otherwise. This division also allows younger students to compete on a more equal footing with one another and is designed to prevent certain age groups from dominating the competition.

The competition presently begins with preliminary rounds played online- the question set used for each tournament's round is sent to a 'host' teacher (generally the coach of one school's team) before a match is played via either Zoom or Microsoft Teams. These matches are knockout, but if a team loses in the first round they drop into their section's Plate competition, in which further knockout matches are then played for a virtual trophy completely online to the end (mirroring the main competition). In the main competition, between three and five matches may be played online (depending on the number of schools) before the field is reduced to eight teams per section. An in-person National Finals then takes place during which the three major accolades- winner, runner-up and Shield winner (the latter prize achievable by defeating other beaten national quarter-finalists in a repechage competition)- are played for by knockout across the course of one day. This takes place at a host school, and has customarily taken place in London since 2022.

=== Question content ===
Question content often echoes the types of questions seen in University Challenge, with an approximate mixture of history, geography, arts, literature, sciences, popular culture and sport. However, a notable amount of academic-adjacent content is often asked on, with questions on etymology and current events common. Furthermore, unlike quizbowl competitions in the US, there is no public set distribution, meaning the content asked on match-to-match can often be ostensibly unpredictable.

== Match structure ==
Matches are played with similar rules to the TV show University Challenge. Short, often one-line 'starter' questions are asked to all contestants and the quickest to buzz in using their individual buzzer must answer immediately on behalf of their team (or the full question is passed to the other team). The team that correctly answers a buzzer question is then asked a round of three 'bonus' questions in succession, often related to the starter question in topic, which they may confer on for a maximum of 10 seconds. Furthermore, in contrast to University Challenge:

- No points are deducted for incorrectly interrupting a starter question on the buzzer.
- Bonus questions are worth 10 points each rather than five.
- Bonus questions in a round may be passed one-by-one to the other team if answered incorrectly.
- A team answering the starter and all three subsequent bonuses correctly gains an extra bonus of 10 points: thus 50 points are available per round.
- There are no picture rounds or music rounds as of present.
- After 25 'bonus' rounds have been heard by both teams, a five-minute countdown is activated. This is the 'lightning section' of the match, and during this section bonus conferring time is reduced to 4 seconds. Once the countdown ends, the match ends.^{[Note 3]}

=== Equipment ===
An online buzzer platform is used for online matches, while 8-player lockout buzzers are ideally used for in-person matches. The latter may supplied by tournament organisers if the hosting school cannot supply the equipment. Tournament rules do not specify a manufacturer, and many schools make their own but the now-obsolete Jaser Quizmaster system is still common in many schools. Questions were originally manually written and mailed to readers and organisers, but are now digitally transmitted.

The use of an electronic scoreboard, which can be projected onto an interactive whiteboard or screen, is commonplace in both online and in-person matches, with the size of the scoreboard generally increasing as the tournament progresses.

== Notable successes ==
The most successful school in the Senior competition's history is current champions Westminster, who have won a record ten times- all in the last twenty years. Concurrently, the most successful school in the Junior competition, and the only school to have won both the Senior and Junior competitions in the same season (2014, 2019 and 2023) is The Perse School. Other historically successful schools in both Junior and Senior competitions include Maidstone Grammar School, Hereford Cathedral School, and King Edward's School, Birmingham. Lancaster Royal Grammar School are the most successful state-funded school in Schools' Challenge history, with three wins apiece in both Senior and Junior competitions. This is a notable achievement considering the dominance of well-funded private schools like Westminster: at the latest Senior Finals in 2024 just one school- inaugural Shield winners KEGS Chelmsford- was a state school. The achievement of schools is often changeable, however, due to the natural turnover of students, and it is not uncommon to see a school do well in the competition for the first time in many years.

There has historically been a comparative lack of female players and all-female teams in particular in Schools' Challenge- in 2024, just one out of thirty-two Senior National players was female. So far, the only all-female teams ever to qualify for the Senior National Finals have been from Bournemouth School for Girls (four times in all) and South Hampstead High School. BSG's 2019 team is to date the most successful all girls' team in the Senior competition's history, having won the Plate Final that year. All-female teams have been however more successful in the Junior competition, with most notably King Edward VI High School for Girls, Birmingham winning in 1987 and 2005.

== Competition history ==
=== Senior Schools' Challenge ===
Year	Winners	Runners-up	Plate/Shield winners:^{[Note 4]}
1977	Trinity School, Croydon	unknown	unknown
1978	King Edward's School, Birmingham	Trinity School, Croydon	unknown
1980	King Edward's School, Birmingham	unknown	unknown
1981	Monmouth School	unknown	unknown
1982	Brentwood School	unknown	unknown
1983	King Henry VIII School Abergavenny	unknown	unknown
1984	Monmouth School	Bury Grammar School	unknown
1985	Norwich School	unknown	unknown
1986	Royal Grammar School, Guildford	Stamford School	unknown
1987	Dean Close School	unknown	unknown
1988	The Grange School	Royal School Dungannon	unknown
1989	Aylesbury Grammar School	Nottingham High School	unknown
1990	King Henry VIII School	unknown	unknown
1991	Nottingham High School	unknown	unknown
1992	Bryanston School	unknown	unknown
1993	Maidstone Grammar School	unknown	unknown
1994	Maidstone Grammar School	unknown	unknown
1995	Maidstone Grammar School	Lancaster Royal Grammar School	Merchant Taylors' School, Crosby
1996	King Edward's School, Birmingham	Merchant Taylors' School, Crosby	unknown
1997	Merchant Taylors' School, Crosby	unknown	unknown
1998	The King's School, Canterbury	unknown	unknown
1999	Devonport High School for Boys	Royal Grammar School, Guildford	unknown
2000	Colchester Royal Grammar School	Royal Grammar School, Guildford	Devonport High School for Boys
2001	The King's School, Canterbury	King Edward's School, Birmingham	Royal Grammar School, Guildford
2002	Abbey Christian Brothers' Grammar School	Royal Grammar School, Guildford	Woodbridge School
2003	King Edward's School, Birmingham	George Heriot's School	Woodbridge School
2004	King Edward's School, Birmingham	Westminster School	The King's School, Worcester
2005	Westminster School	Bedford School	Manchester Grammar School
2006	Westminster School	Solihull School	George Heriot's School
2007	Westminster School	unknown	Nottingham High School
2008	Westminster School	Manchester Grammar School	Abingdon School
2009	Westminster School	Lancaster Royal Grammar School	Solihull School
2010	Lancaster Royal Grammar School	The King's School, Worcester	Abingdon School
2011	King Edward's School, Birmingham	Westminster School	Lancaster Royal Grammar School
2012	Lancaster Royal Grammar School	Haberdashers' Aske's Boys' School	Devonport High School for Boys
2013	Lancaster Royal Grammar School	Haberdashers' Aske's Boys' School	Monmouth School
2014	The Perse School	Hereford Cathedral School	King Edward's School, Birmingham
2015	Haberdashers' Aske's Boys' School	King Edward's School, Birmingham	Westminster School
2016	Westminster School	King Edward VI Camp Hill School for Boys	Lancaster Royal Grammar School
2017	The Perse School	Lancaster Royal Grammar School	Hereford Cathedral School
2018	Westminster School	Lancaster Royal Grammar School	The Perse School
2019	The Perse School	Magdalen College School	Bournemouth School for Girls
2020	Westminster School	King Edward's School, Birmingham	The Perse School
2021	Cancelled due to COVID-19 pandemic	–	–
2022	Westminster School	The Perse School	King Edward's School, Birmingham
2023	The Perse School	King Edward's School, Birmingham	Westminster School
2024	Westminster School	Hampton School	King Edward VI Grammar School, Chelmsford
2025	Winchester College	King Edward's School, Birmingham	Hills Road Sixth Form College
2026	Colchester Royal Grammar School	Hampton School	Brighton College

==== Multiple winners – Senior ====
School	Wins	Years
Westminster School	10	2005, 2006, 2007, 2008, 2009, 2016, 2018, 2020, 2022, 2024
King Edward's School, Birmingham	6	1978, 1980, 1996, 2003, 2004, 2011
The Perse School	4	2014, 2017, 2019, 2023
Maidstone Grammar School	3	1993, 1994, 1995
Lancaster Royal Grammar School	3	2010, 2012, 2013
Monmouth School	2	1981, 1984
The King's School, Canterbury	2	1998, 2001
Colchester Royal Grammar School	2	2000, 2026

=== Intermediate Schools' Challenge ===
Year	Winners	Runners-up	Plate/Shield Winners
2024	Hampton School	King Edward's School, Birmingham	George Heriot's School
2025	The Perse School	Hampton School	-
2026	King Edward's School, Birmingham	The Perse School	Haberdashers' Boys' School

=== Junior Schools' Challenge ===
Year	Winners	Runners-up	Plate/Shield Winners
1980	Port Regis Prep School	unknown	unknown
1981	Royal Grammar School, High Wycombe	unknown	unknown
1982	unknown	unknown	unknown
1983	Haberdashers' Aske's Boys' School	unknown	unknown
1984	King's Hall School, Taunton	unknown	unknown
1985	Eagle House School	unknown	unknown
1986	Nottingham High School	unknown	unknown
1987	King Edward VI High School for Girls	unknown	unknown
1988	Millfield Preparatory School	unknown	unknown
1989	Bablake School	unknown	unknown
1990	Exeter School	unknown	unknown
1991	St Peter's Church of England Aided School	unknown	unknown
1992	Hutchesons' Grammar School	unknown	unknown
1993	Dulwich College Preparatory School	Chelmsford County High School for Girls	unknown
1994	Hutchesons' Grammar School	unknown	unknown
1995	Lancaster Royal Grammar School	unknown	unknown
1996	King Edward VII School (King's Lynn)	Dulwich College Preparatory School	Holmwood House
1997	Devonport High School for Boys	unknown	unknown
1998	King Edward's School, Birmingham	unknown	unknown
1999	King Edward's School, Birmingham	unknown	unknown
2000	Prebendal School	Woodbridge School	Tockington School
2001	Bourne Grammar School	George Heriot’s School	The King's School, Rochester
2002	George Heriot’s School	Colchester Royal Grammar School	St John's on-the-Hill School
2003	Manchester Grammar School	The King's School, Rochester	Sandroyd School
2004	Milbourne Lodge Preparatory School	Royal Belfast Academical Institution	Beechwood Park School
2005	The Cathedral School, Llandaff	George Heriot’s School	The Pilgrims' School
2006	The Cathedral School, Llandaff	The Junior King's School, Canterbury	King Edward's School, Birmingham
2007	Lancaster Royal Grammar School	Prebendal School	Queen Mary's Grammar School
2008	Lancaster Royal Grammar School	Queen Mary's Grammar School	Milbourne Lodge Preparatory School
2009	Merchant Taylors' School, Crosby	Magdalen College School	Devonport High School for Boys
2010	Dollar Academy	The Pilgrims' School, Winchester	The Cathedral School, Llandaff
2011	The Perse School	The Pilgrims' School, Winchester	Lancaster Royal Grammar School
2012	The Perse School	Dragon School	Hutchesons' Grammar School
2013	Haberdashers' Aske's Boys' School	The Perse School	Dulwich College Preparatory School
2014	The Perse School	Haberdashers' Aske's Boys' School	Dulwich Prep London
2015	Dulwich Prep London	The Perse School	Nottingham High School
2016	The Perse School	George Heriot's School	Nottingham High School
2017	Royal Grammar School, Guildford	King Edward VI School, Stratford-upon-Avon	George Heriot's School
2018	The Perse School	George Heriot's School	St Olave's School, York
2019	The Perse School	unknown	unknown
2020	The Perse School	Dragon School, Oxford	King's School, Rochester
2021	Cancelled due to COVID-19 pandemic	–	–
2022	King Edward's School, Birmingham	The Perse School	unknown
2023	The Perse School	Magdalen College School	City of London School
2024	The Perse School	King Edward VI School, Stratford-upon-Avon	City of London School
2025	The Perse School	Hilden Grange School	King Edward's School, Birmingham
2026	The Perse School	KEGS Chelmsford	Habedashers' Askes' Boys School

==== Multiple winners – Junior ====
School	Wins	Years
The Perse School	10	2011, 2012, 2014, 2016, 2018, 2019, 2020, 2023, 2024, 2025
Lancaster Royal Grammar School	3	1995, 2007, 2008
King Edward's School, Birmingham	3	1998, 1999, 2022
Haberdashers' Boys' School	2	1983, 2013
Dulwich College Preparatory School / Dulwich Prep London*	2	1993, 2015
The Cathedral School, Llandaff	2	2005, 2006

*Dulwich Prep London had previously been known as Dulwich College Preparatory School.

== See also ==
- Quiz bowl
- University Challenge

== Notes ==
^{Back}Information correct as of June 2024.
^{Back}Bolton School are (as of 2024) the current Senior Plate holders, Bedford School are the current Intermediate holders and the Junior Plate competition will be played on the 30th of June.
^{Back}At the National Finals, matches are instead timed for 30 minutes on normal rules, with the match ending either once the thirty minutes have ended or 35 starter rounds have been read- in part due to schedule limitations.
^{Back}In 2024, the Shield replaced the Plate as the primary repechage award given.
