= Ritblat =

Ritblat is a surname. Notable people with the surname include:

- Jamie Ritblat (born 1967), British businessman
- John Ritblat (born 1935), English property developer
