= Alpha Plus =

Alpha Plus may refer to:

- A term from the 1932 novel Brave New World
- Alpha Plus Group, a UK education company
