= Abbey Christian Brothers' Grammar School =

Abbey Christian Brothers' Grammar School, Newry
- Scoil na Mainistreach, Iúr Cinn Trá
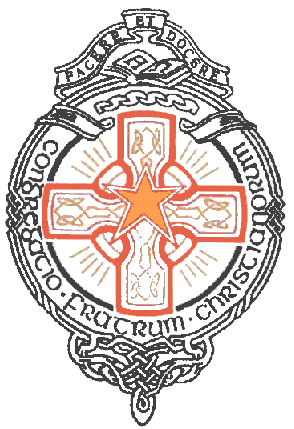

Location
- 77a Ashgrove Road; Newry, County Down, BT34 1QN; Northern Ireland
- Coordinates: 54.172°N 6.332°W

Information
- School type: Boys Grammar
- Religious affiliation: Roman Catholic
- Established: 1851; 175 years ago, current site – 2010
- Status: Christian Brothers' Grammar School
- School board: Education Authority (South Eastern)
- Principal: Gina Savage
- Staff: 80 approx.
- Gender: Male
- Age: 11 to 18
- Enrollment: 800
- Houses: Breffni, Donard, Iveagh, Oriel, Slemish
- Colour
- Sports: Gaelic Football, basketball, rugby
- Newspaper: The Abbey Way
- Website: www.abbeycbs.org

The Abbey Christian Brothers' Grammar School (Irish: Scoil na Mainistreach, Iúr Cinn Trá) is a voluntary day school for boys aged 11 – 18 years in Newry, County Down, Northern Ireland.

== History ==
The school was established in 1851 by members of the Congregation of Christian Brothers. It was named after a Cistercian Abbey founded on the site by St Malachy in 1144. Since then the school had been located at several sites around Newry including Chapel Street, Kilmorey Street, the Carstands at Margaret Street and the Mall, then on to Abbey Yard. From 1966 to 2010 it was located at Courtney Hill. In 2010, it moved to a new £18 million building on the outskirts of Newry. The school gives its name to many streets surrounding the former site such as Abbey Yard and Abbey Heights.

The school was originally entirely run by the Irish Christian Brothers, but in the late twentieth century their numbers declined and the school is now entirely staffed by lay teachers. It is now under the trusteeship of the Edmund Rice Schools Trust (NI).

== Academics ==
The school provides instruction in a range of academic subjects. In 2018, 94.5% of its entrants achieved five or more GCSEs at grades A* to C, including the core subjects English and Maths. As of 2019, 77.2% of students who sat the A-level exams were awarded three A*-C grades.

== Achievements ==
- Winners of the NI Regional Senior Schools Quiz Challenge (general knowledge quiz) 2011–2018.
- The Hogan All Ireland Gaelic Schools Cup 2006.
- Winners of the Senior UK Schools Quiz Challenge (general knowledge quiz) 2002.
- Winners of the MacRory Cup (Gaelic football competition): 1954, 1959, 1964, 1987, 2006, 2026.
- Runners-up of the BM Quizzing Championships (NI Schools General Knowledge Quizzing Championships) 2022/2023.

== Notable former pupils ==
Name	Lifespan	Description
Leonard Abrahamson	1896-1961	Irish cardiologist and Professor of Medicine at the Royal College of Surgeons in Ireland
Frank Aiken	1898–1983	Teachta Dála (TD), Irish Republican Army commander, Tánaiste; Minister for Defence (1932–1939), Minister for the Co-ordination of Defensive Measures (1939–1945), Minister for Finance (1945–1948), and Minister for External Affairs (1951–1954; 1957–1969)
Mickey Brady	1950–2026	Sinn Féin MP for Newry and Armagh
Art Cosgrove	born 1940	Irish historian and writer; Chancellor, University College Dublin
Denis Donoghue	1928–2021	Irish writer
Joe Kernan	born 1954	Gaelic footballer
Seamus Mallon	1936–2020	Member of Parliament (MP) for Newry & Armagh (1986–2005), SDLP Deputy Leader (1979–2001), and Deputy First Minister of Northern Ireland (1998–2001)
Kevin McKernan	born 1987	Down GAA Gaelic footballer
Oisín McConville	born 1975	Gaelic footballer
Peter McVerry	born 1944	Poverty campaigner
Gerard Murphy	1948–2018	Actor
Turlough O'Donnell	1924-2017	Lord Justice of Appeal of Northern Ireland
Eunan O'Neill	born 1982	Television presenter (RT / Russia Today)
Seán O'Neill	born 1938	Gaelic footballer
Ronan Rafferty	born 1964	Irish professional golfer
Patrick Shea	1908–1986	Northern Ireland civil servant

== See also ==
- List of secondary schools in Belfast
