= Hugh Barker =

English lawyer

Hugh Barker (1564 – 8 July 1632) was an English lawyer.

Barker was born in Culworth, Northamptonshire. He was educated at Winchester College, where he gained a founders' kin scholarship aged 13 in 1577; he later gave a silver-gilt cup to the college. He matriculated at New College, Oxford on 4 March 1585/6, holding a fellowship 1585–1591, graduating B.C.L. on 19 February 1591/2, D.C.L. on 17 June 1605.

He was master of the Prebendal School, Chichester, where his pupils included the jurist John Selden. He was later Chancellor of the Diocese of Oxford. He was admitted to Doctors' Commons on 9 June 1607.

He died in 1632, and was buried in the upper end of the chapel of New College, Oxford, where he is commemorated by a monument by Nicholas Stone with a Latin epitaph.

== Note ==
The Dictionary of National Biography originally claimed that Barker was Dean of the Arches for several years; this claim is repeated in several other sources, but was deleted as an error in 1904.
