= Here East =

Media complex in the Olympic Park in London, England

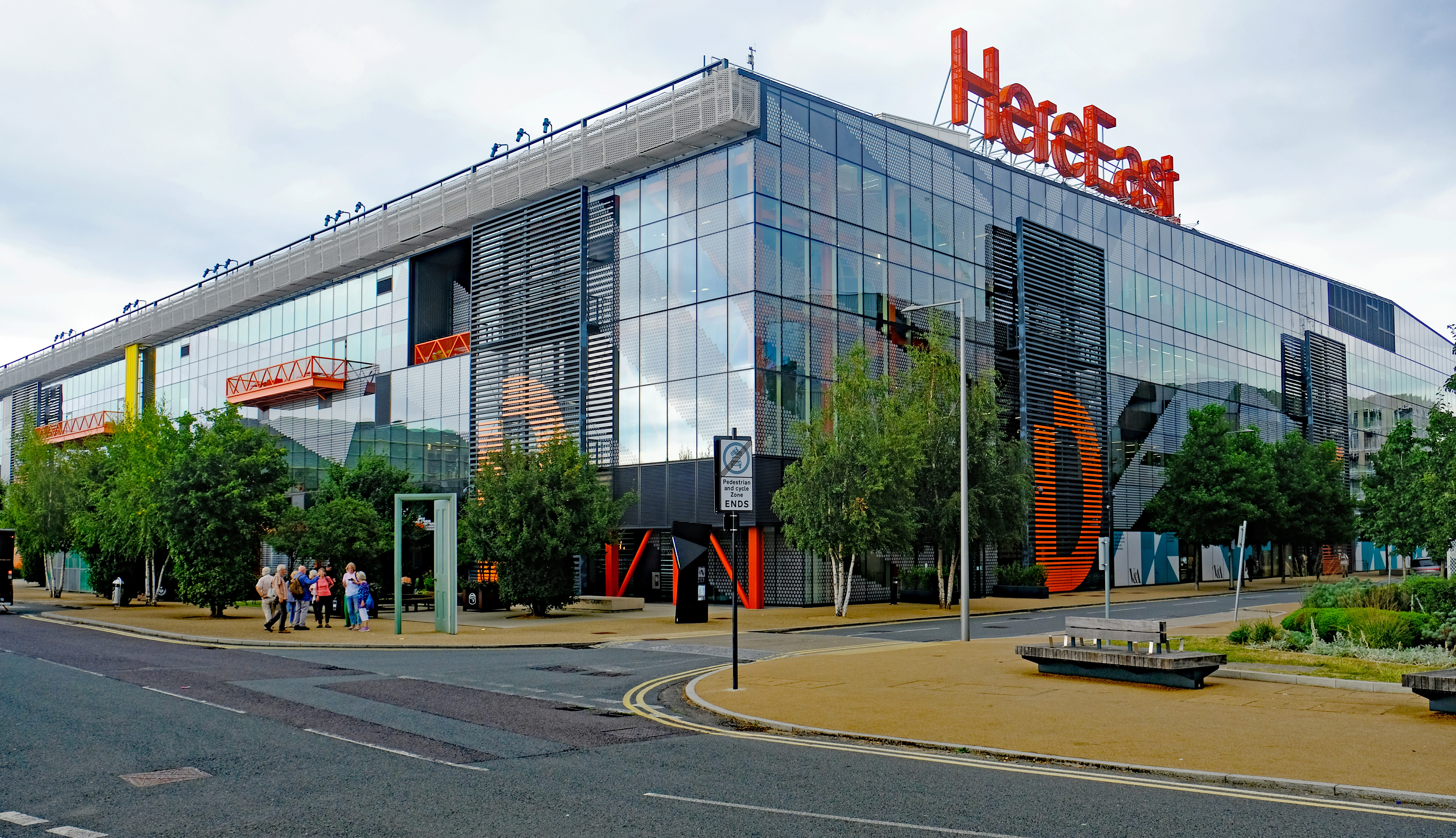
- Here East complex in 2024

- Location within London Borough of Newham
- Former names: London Olympics Media Centre (2011–2014)

General information
- Type: Television broadcast facilities, International Broadcast Centre (formerly)
- Location: Queen Elizabeth Olympic Park, London E15 2GW, United Kingdom
- Coordinates: 51°32′50″N 0°01′20″W
- Cost: £355m ($473m)
- Renovation cost: £90m ($120m)

Technical details
- Floor area: 1,200,000 sq ft (110,000 m^{2})

Website
- Official website

Here East is a media complex located in the Olympic Park in East London, built specially for the 2012 London Olympics. It is located at the site of the former Hackney Wick Stadium close to the Riverbank Arena in Hackney Wick.

During the Olympics and Paralympics, the complex was named the London Olympics Media Centre. It was later refurbished and renamed to Here East.

== History ==
=== London Olympics Media Centre ===
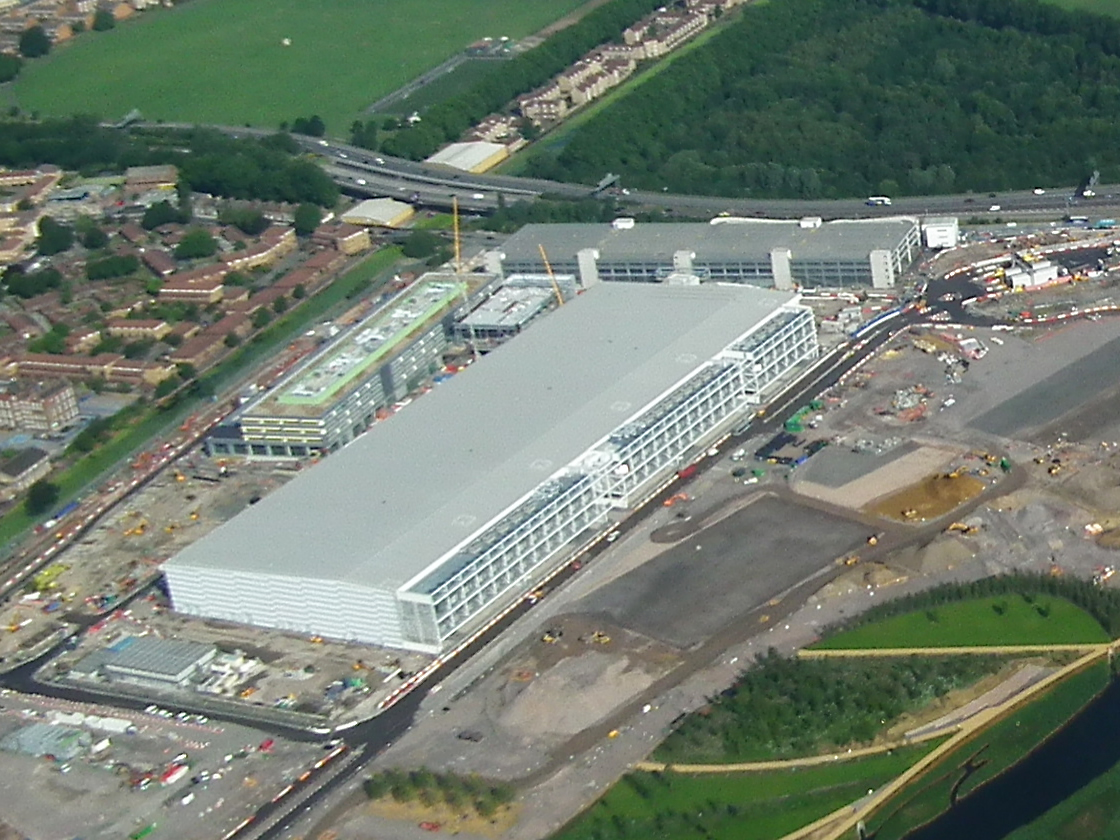
The London Olympics Media Centre (incorporating the International Broadcast Centre and Main Press Centre) in June 2011

At the time of the Olympic bid it was intended that the complex would be privately financed on the basis that the building would have residual value from alternative uses after the games. As of December 2009, the Olympic Delivery Authority had allocated £702 million of Programme and Funders' contingency, largely to cover the decisions to publicly fund the Village and Media Centre after it became clear private funding could not be secured on acceptable terms during the 2008 to 2010 economic crisis.

The complex was a 24-hour media hub that catered for over 20,000 broadcasters, photographers and print journalists facilitating broadcasts to 4 billion people worldwide. It contained an International Broadcast Centre (IBC) and a Main Press Centre (MPC).

The design of the complex, which was 275 metres (902 ft) long, was by Allies and Morrison. It had a catering village and a multi-storey car park to link the two main venues (the IBC and the MPC) together. The construction cost was £355 million and the main contractor was Carillion. It was completed in July 2011.

=== Legacy ===
Following the games, the property firm Delancey formed a joint venture with Infinity SDC to convert the Olympic broadcast and press centre into a tech hub for corporations. The joint venture was called iCity, with Laing O'Rourke being appointed to carry out the £150 million redevelopment of the Broadcasting Centre. Consultants Buro Happold provided the engineering design, working in collaboration with architects Hawkins\Brown.

The complex was designed to create some 900,000 square feet (84,000 m^{2}) of business space as part of the legacy of the games. BT Sport broadcast from the centre from its inception in August 2013, to its rebranding in July 2023 and had three studios there. WWE also taped its NXT UK television programme at the studios from 2020 to 2021.

In February 2014 the site was renamed Here East. It went on to accommodate campuses for Staffordshire University, Loughborough University and University College London as well as Plexal, a co-working location for start-up businesses.

== Current tenants ==
Current tenants include:

- Barratt London
- Liverpool Media Academy
- Loughborough University
- Scope
- Sports Interactive
- Staffordshire University
- Studio Wayne McGregor
- Teesside University
- UCL
- V&A East
