= John Ritblat =

British property developer

Sir John Ritblat
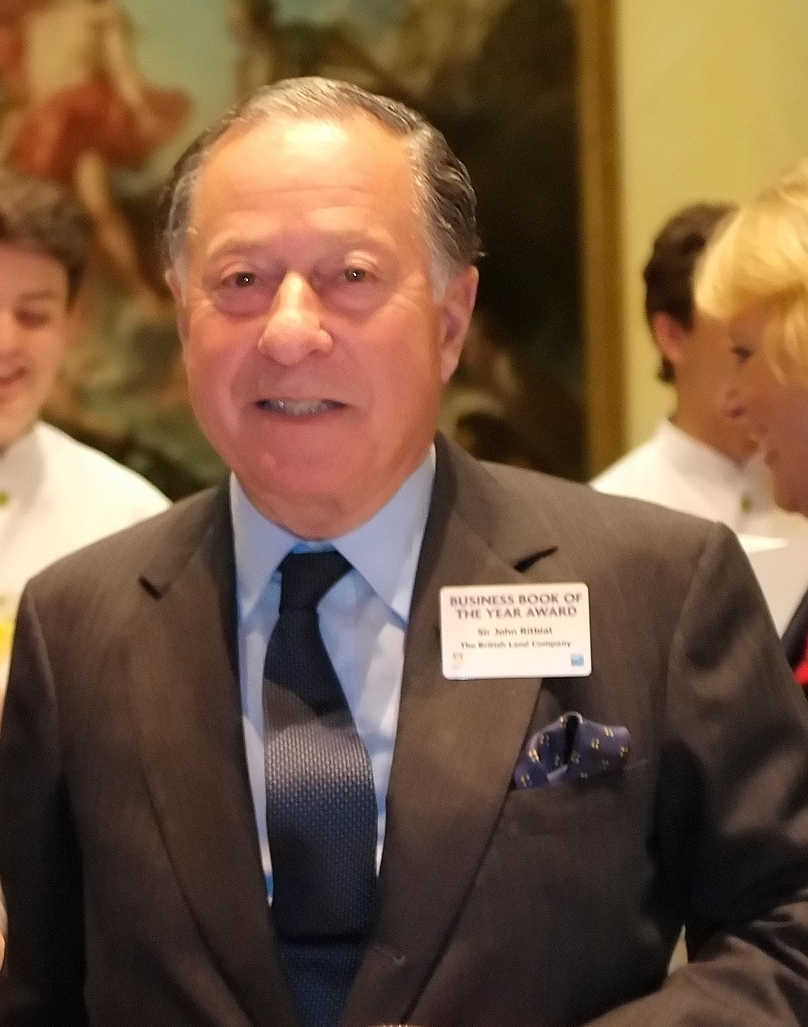
- John Ritblat in 2011
- Born: John Henry Ritblat; 3 October 1935 (age 90); London, England
- Education: Dulwich College; College of Estate Management.
- Occupations: Property developer, philanthropist
- Spouse: 2, including Jill Zilkha
- Children: Jamie Ritblat

Sir John Henry Ritblat FRICS (born 3 October 1935) is an English property developer. He is honorary president (and formerly chairman and CEO) of The British Land Company PLC, an FTSE250 London-based property company in which George Soros' G Soros Realty Investors acquired a stake in 1993.

== Early life ==
Ritblat was born in 1935 in Hampstead, North London, England to a Jewish family. He was educated at Dulwich College, The Hall School, Hampstead and the College of Estate Management.

== Career ==
He acquired British Land from Jim Slater in 1970 for £1m, and retired as chairman in 2006.

Since June 2001, Ritblat has served as the non-executive chairman of property advisory Colliers CRE. He also serves as the chairman of the advisory board of Delancey, the property and asset-backed investment firm founded in 1995 by his son Jamie Ritblat (born 1967), which owns the Alpha Plus Group of schools of which Sir John is the chairman of the board of governors.

== Political activity ==
Ritblat has donated to the Conservative Party. In August 2018, Jim Fitzpatrick MP forwarded a letter to the Crown Estate that made unsubstantiated allegations about the 2010 off-market sale of the Royal Mint Court freehold to DV4, a wholly owned subsidiary of Delancey based in the British Virgin Islands and questioning the Crown Estate's relationship with the Ritblat family.

== Philanthropy ==
Ritblat is Chairman of the Board of Trustees of the Wallace Collection, Chairman of the governing body of the London Business School and an Honorary Fellow, a member of the Council of The Royal Institution, Honorary President of the British Ski and Snowboard Federation, Deputy Chairman and an Honorary Fellow of the Royal Academy of Music, an Honorary Fellow of the Royal Institute of British Architects, and Vice-chairman of International Students House, London.

The John Ritblat gallery of the British Library houses some of the finest items in the library's collection for public display; it is named after him as he was a major benefactor during the building of the gallery and donated £1,000,000 towards the gallery's display cases.

== Personal life ==
Ritblat has been married twice. His second wife, Jill (Zilkha née Slotover), is a philanthropist. He has two sons, Jamie Ritblat (b 1967) and Nick Ritblat, and a daughter, Suki Ritblat.
