= Royal Mint Court =

Building complex in London, England

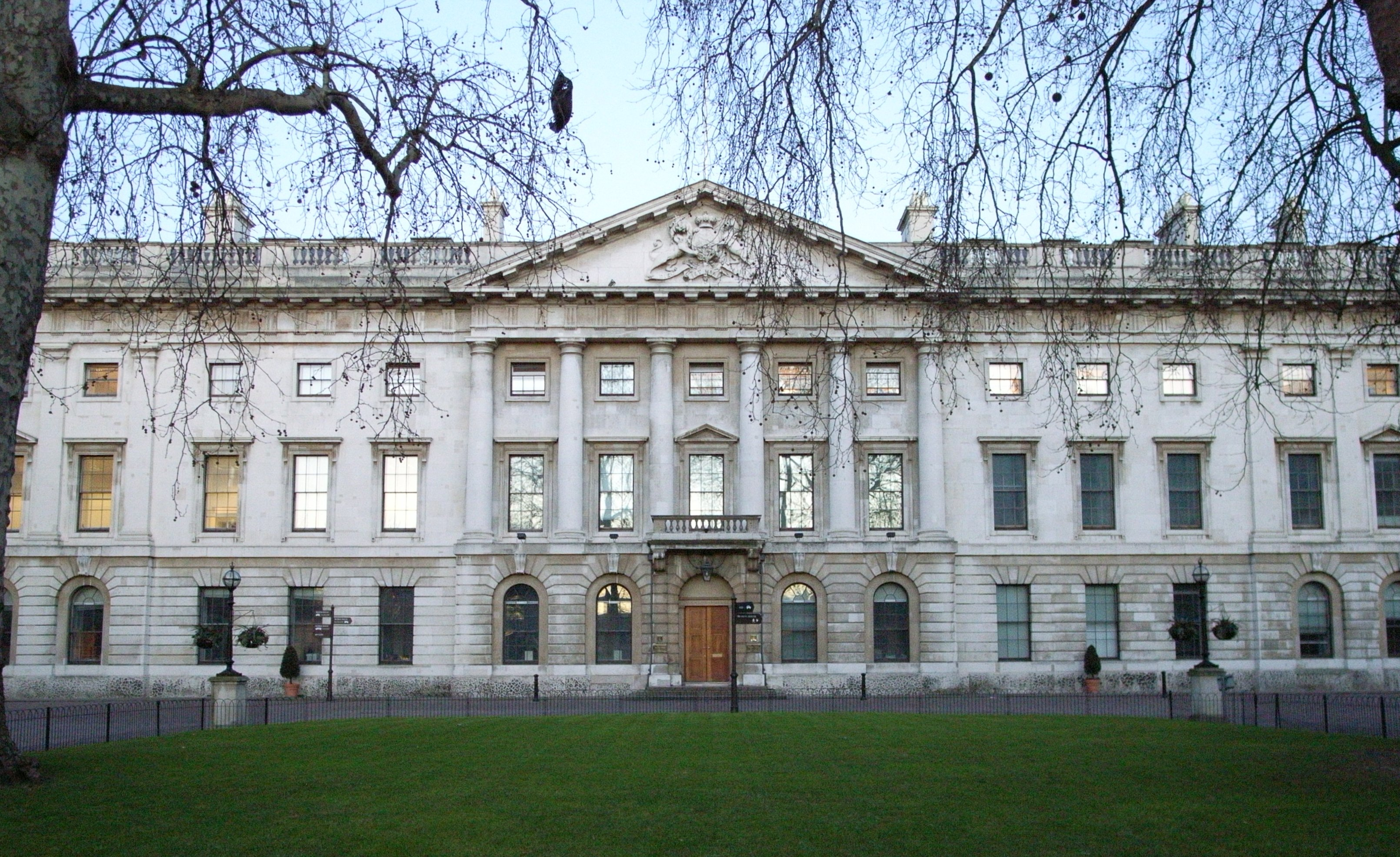
- The Johnson Smirke Building

General information
- Location: London, England
- Coordinates: 51.5092894°N 0.0729155°W
- Owner: Government of China

Royal Mint Court, formerly known as Eastminster, is a building complex in Tower Hamlets. It is located in front of the Tower Bridge and is close to the City of London financial district. The site was the home of the Royal Mint from 1809 until 1967 and was earlier the site of a Cistercian abbey, built in 1348 and known in its time as Eastminster. Eastminster's foundations are relatively well preserved and visible in the partially open basement of the site. In May 2018, the site was sold to China to be used for their new London embassy.

After the dissolution of the monasteries, the 5.5 acre (2 hectare) property was used as a victualling yard for the Royal Navy, then as a tobacco warehouse, before becoming a mint in 1809. After the mint relocated, the site was redeveloped in 1987 by the Crown Estate Commissioners with a new office and residential block added to the complex alongside the two remaining Grade II listed mint buildings. The 100 residential homes were leasehold properties and Queen Elizabeth II was the Superior Landlord.

In 2017, Royal Mint Court was again set to be redeveloped with plans for a new office, shopping and leisure complex. Planning permission was granted in July 2016. As the freeholder, China became the superior landlord over the 100 leasehold homes. David Chipperfield was appointed as the architect for development of the site in 2020.

== History ==
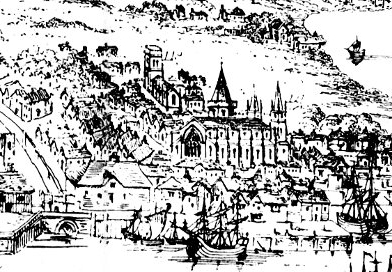
Eastminster in 1543

During the Black Death in 1349 the site became a plague cemetery known as the Churchyard of the Holy Trinity, and three mass burial trenches and 14 grave rows were dug alongside a small chapel. During excavation of the site between 1986 and 1988 the remains of 762 bodies were recovered, as well as a number of belt buckles and two hoards of coins. On 20 March 1350 Edward III granted the site to the Cistercian order for the building of a new chapel named the Royal Free Chapel of St Mary Graces on Tower Hill, which eventually became the Abbey of St. Mary de Graces; the monastery was known as Eastminster, or sometimes New Abbey. Built to house just ten monks and an abbot, the abbey was the last Cistercian foundation in England to be built before the Dissolution of the Monasteries. In 1538 St Mary Graces was surrendered to the Crown and sold to Sir Arthur Darcy, who demolished part of the monastery buildings and lived there until his death in 1560. The site was then sold back to the Crown; it was a victualling yard for the Royal Navy until 1739, when the navy moved to new premises in Deptford.

=== The Royal Mint ===
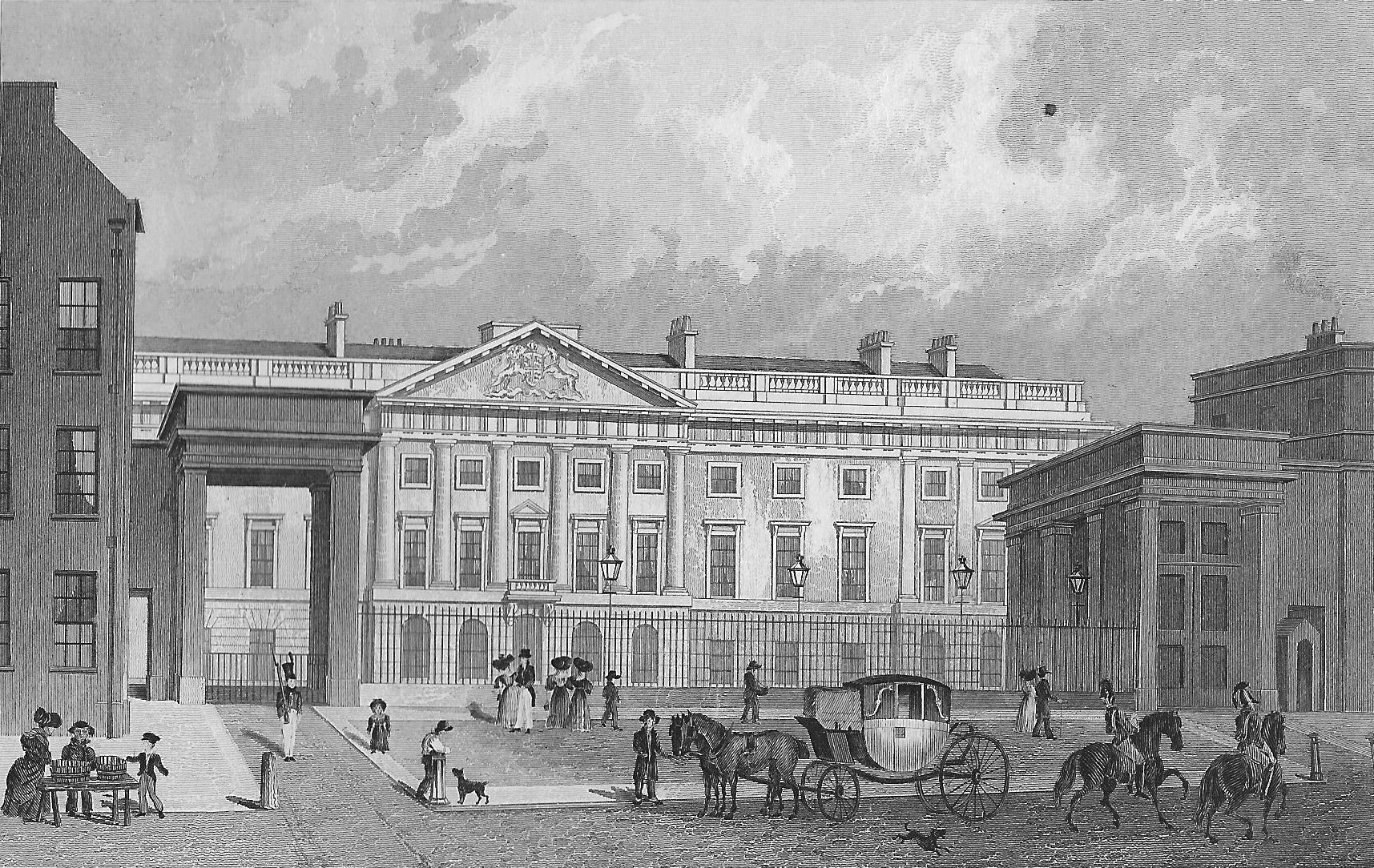
The Royal Mint, Tower Hill, London in 1830.

The Royal Mint, previously housed in the Tower of London, moved to the site between 1806 and 1811, and the Mint's new buildings were finished by the end of 1809. The main building, designed by James Johnson and completed by Robert Smirke, contained apartments for the Deputy Master of the Mint, the Assay Master, and the Provost of the Moneyers as well as bullion stores and the Mint Office. In addition to the main building, the site included two gatehouses, buildings housing machinery, and dwelling houses for officers and staff. A boundary wall surrounded the site. A narrow alley known as the Military Way ran along the inside of the wall, patrolled by the Royal Mint's military guard. In the 1880s the machinery buildings were reconstructed and extended, and there was further rebuilding at the turn of the century. By the 1960s little of the original mint remained apart from the Smirke building and gatehouses.

=== The Royal Mint Refinery ===
In 1848, a royal commission examined the efficiency of the Royal Mint and recommended that the Royal Mint separate the process of refining gold and striking gold coins and that refining be leased to an agency that was external to the Royal Mint. Anthony de Rothschild (1810-1876) was very enthusiastic about the opportunity to manage the gold refinery and on 26 January 1852 he wrote to the Deputy Master of the Mint of his readiness to 'execute the Lease for the Refinery. On 3 February 1852, a Lease for the buildings and equipment was sanctioned and the Royal Mint Refinery became part of Rothschild's London businesses' interests for over a century'. Prior to receiving the Lease, the Rothschilds had a long history of gold trading in Paris and London and in 1815 they famously provided the Duke of Wellington with gold coins to pay his soldiers prior to the Battle of Waterloo. In 1825, the Rothschilds came to the aid of the Bank of England when a number of English banks collapsed causing a run on the Bank. Using family connections, they were able to purchase gold from European banks.

The Royal Mint Refinery proved to be a huge success for the Rothschilds as new gold finds in California and Australia brought a wave of new supplies of gold into London in the 1850s. By the 1890s the operations were so successful that they were able to acquire the freehold of the Royal Mint Refinery, which had previously been leased to them. They also purchased freehold properties on Royal Mint Street and other locations close to the refinery and these were provided as housing for workers and their families. In 1894, Alfred de Rothschild acquired a plot of freehold land in Cartwright Street from the Metropolitan Board of Works on the understanding it would be kept for at least eighty years 'Artisans Dwellings' to accommodate 100 workmen at the refinery.

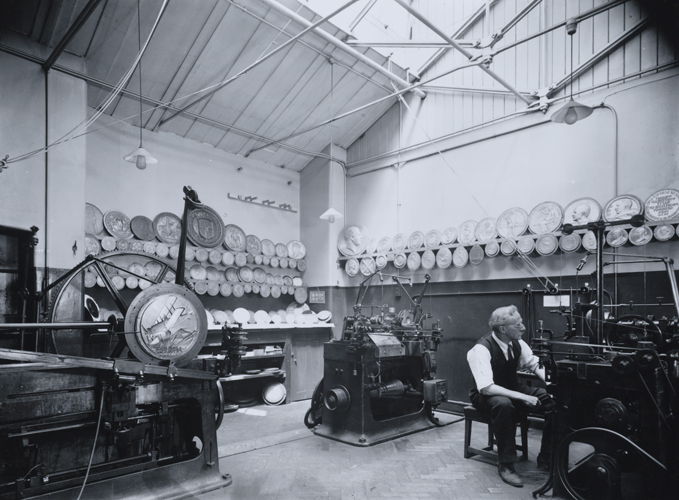
An engraving room with a reducing machine inside the Royal Mint, c. 1934

Rothschild, through its connection to the refinery, gained access to and control over British Empire gold, which in 1914 accounted for 70 per cent. of world output; the majority of which was shipped to London and treated at the Rothschild refinery. Operations continued through the first and second world wars until the 1960s when the refinery was no longer viable and in 1965 the copper foil plant was sold to Clevite followed two years later by the sale of the entire business to Engelhard Industries Limited. In November 1968, the last Rothschild employee of the refinery left the building and closed the gate on 19 Royal Mint Street.

In 2018, the Land Registry Extract for Royal Mint Court, Title Number EGL198329 contained, 'A Conveyance dated 10 April 1929 of the land tinted blue on the title plan made between (1) The King's Most Excellent Majesty (2) The Commissioners of the Crown Lands and (3) Lionel Nathan de Rothschild and Anthony Gustav de Rothschild excluded the walls on the north .........and west sides therof and the recess marked A, B on the plan annexed to the conveyance under the arch in the west wall thereof.'

The Title also includes, 'A Licence dated 11 December 1962 made between (1) Her Majesty's Postmaster general and (2) Edmund Leopold de Rothschild, Leopold David de Rothschild, Evelyn Robert Adrian de Rothschild and Rothschild Continuation Limited relates to the erection and maintenance of a security fence'.

=== Post Royal Mint ===
The Royal Mint was based at the site until 1967, when it began moving to its current site in Llantrisant, Wales. Minting ceased at Royal Mint Court in 1975. Two new office buildings were constructed on the site in the 1980s. Designed by Sheppard Robson, they were subsequently known as Murray House and Dexter House. This brought the site's total office space to 460,000 square feet (4.3 hectares). Smirke's 1809 building ceased to be used by the Royal Mint in January 2000. After the Mint vacated the Murray House building on the site it was used as commercial offices by Barclays Global Investors which paid £5 million rent annually, and was later sublet to Deloitte and Old Mutual until the tenancy expired at the end of 2014.

Leases for the offices were granted to Gulldale Limited a company incorporated in the Isle of Man which took a mortgage based on income from the properties. The Royal Mint Court mortgage was securitised as part of a £401,340,000 Barclays Capital-issued Commercial Mortgage Backed Security (CMBS) called Equinox Eclipse 2006-1 sold in 2006. The maturity due date for these notes was January 2018.The value of the leaseholds fell afterwards leaving the securitised loan with an unpaid balance of £69.5m, while the B-loan, held by a private individual investor, had £14m outstanding balance, against a less than £32.5m valuation for the Royal Mint Court leasehold. It was reported that bondholders of this did not consider it economically attractive to sell the leasehold for Royal Mint Court. On 6 March 2014, Gulldale Limited was placed into administration in England. In so doing, Gulldale became the first Isle of Man incorporated company with the centre of main interest in the Isle of Man to be placed into administration in England.

=== Sale of the freehold to Delancey ===
In 1994, a company led by the billionaire George Soros, G Soros Realty Investors, acquired £1.34 million British Land shares at 298p from a Quantum Fund holding. Documents issued by British Land did not disclose this, but did reveal that Mr John Ritblat received 2 million shares at cost from the Quantum Fund. When the matter was made public in June 1993, Mr Ritblat's share issuance was defended as providing an incentive for British Land to perform. An early deal for Soros and Ritblat was for the Broadgate complex in the City of London in 1994.

In 1998, in a complicated deal, one of George Soros's Quantum hedge funds from the tax-efficient British Virgin Islands pumped £127m into Delancey Estates. Quantum, places money offshore for high net worth individuals, shares go to a trust for some of the Soros family, and to a Guernsey company linked to Richard Katz and his wife. The deal with Quantum would give Delancey net assets of £150m, of which £128m would be cash. Although Quantum provided financial backing for Delancey, management for the property arm of the company was to be provided by Freehold Portfolios Estates (FPE), a property advisory company owned by Jamie Ritblat.

In 2000, The Guardian reported that Delancey Estates, then a quoted George Soros-backed property vehicle, could be the next major real estate company to take itself private. The first major office investment was reported to be 6 Chesterfield Gardens, London W1 for £30m in 2003 and Soros's Morstan Nominees was said to be the largest shareholder in Delancey's old Tribeca fund.

In 2005, The Guardian reported that Soros was buying £2bn of London property through his investments Delancey. At the time, Delancey was selling off commercial property and also sold its stake in Mapeley, the off-shore firm that owned and managed Inland Revenue buildings. The article added that this was seen as a vote of confidence in the long-term strength of the UK commercial property market. George Soros was also investing in other businesses including a large stake in one of China's largest airlines.

Mapeley Real Estate was the subject of press coverage in 2002 when the UK Treasury Select Committee questioned why the Inland Revenue sold its estate of more than 600 buildings to a Bermuda-based company, and later admitted it wrongly announced the properties were sold to a UK firm; and again in 2020 when a £6.5m Government payment was made to a company in a tax haven). Sir Nicholas Montagu, the Revenue's chairman told the Treasury Sub Committee his department had issued misleading information and also failed to inform parliament properly and apologised. In 2009, Mapeley warned shareholders it could go bust if it did not raise £48m as it needed to pay back £60m to Deutsche Bank in April. Following an audit by the National Audit Office in 2010, The Guardian reported that those who negotiated the 20-year deal with Mapeley were inept and had deprived the UK of income when everyone living in the country was having to pay more tax and austerity to pay for bailout of the banks in 2008, and should hang their heads in shame. Mapeley was owned by Fortress Investment Group, USA, Soros Real Estate, Netherlands and Delancy East Ltd, UK, but was later based offshore in Bermuda. The Strategic Transfer of the Revenue properties to the Private Sector was expected to save A$860m (£344m) over the 20-year contract period.

Whilst the Barclays mortgage for Royal Mint Court and subsequent CMBS had been secured against commercial leases held by Gulldale Limited, in 2009, the Crown Estate approved the sale of the freehold land and buildings of Royal Mint to DV4, a wholly owned subsidiary of Delancey for £51m. However, the sale completion date was deferred until June 2010 and the sale was to remain confidential until that date. DV4 was an offshore company incorporated in the British Virgin Islands and appears in the Panama Papers.

The majority of the Royal Mint Court commercial site became vacant in early 2013. In 2014 LRC Group paid £49.5 million for a debt secured on the long leasehold title for the site. In 2015 the site was occupied by squatters as a protest against homelessness.

Delancey's freehold interest gave the company the power to block new tenants and 2015 Delancey and LRC agreed a joint venture in 2015 to redevelop the site. In 2016 planning permission was granted for the Grade II-listed building to be refurbished and the site redeveloped into an office, shopping and leisure complex. In 2016, a dispute over right to light occurred between the freeholder RMC FH Co and Metropolitan Housing Trust. The court considered whether Metropolitan as a long leaseholder had the right to release a neighbouring residential development from a right to light. The judge held that the long leaseholder was prevented from doing so by the terms of the lease and found in favour of the freeholder who had obtained planning permission to redevelop Royal Mint Court.

=== Sale to China ===
In May 2018 Delancey and LRC sold the freehold site to the People's Republic of China for conversion into their new London embassy, the largest embassy in Europe. The real estate company CBRE had been working with the Chinese Embassy for many years to identify a suitable site for the relocation of the Embassy. In November 2020, the media agency acting for the Chinese Embassy sent its first letter to residents in the local community notifying them of initial plans for redevelopment of the site. The letter and proposals for the site excluded any plan for the land upon which the 100 homes stand. The redevelopment was welcomed however the letter was met with some criticism in the community.

==== Concerns about transparency and human rights ====
In 2018, residents of homes on the land now owned by China wrote to UK government ministers to express their concerns about the original sale by the Crown Estate and to ask for legal and diplomatic assistance to communicate with their new superior landlord. This included an appeal to Jeremy Hunt, then Foreign Secretary, for his help, claiming that the local government, Delancey and the Chinese Ambassador had not communicated with people living on the land. They said, "These actions and omissions by the UK Government and Tower Hamlets give grounds to suspect that public officials are failing to respect and protect the human rights of individuals who reside in Leasehold homes at St Mary Graces Court. On the face of it, it appears the Government are discriminating against us as social housing tenants and showing favouritism to the Chinese Ambassador and PRC." The letter went on to say that they sought to return to the security that was afforded when The Queen was their superior landlord. It also quoted a speech given in East London on 5 March 2018 by then Prime Minister Theresa May in which she spoke of the need to make housing ownership fairer and more equitable.

The correspondence followed a report in the East London Advertiser newspaper that John Briggs, the Mayor of Tower Hamlets and chief executive Will Tuckley had welcomed the Chinese ambassador Liu Xiaoming and a delegation of Chinese diplomats and participated in a ceremony at Royal Mint Court. The families residing at Royal Mint Court were not invited to the event.

In 2020, the plan was opposed by some local councillors and residents, due to the Chinese government's persecution of Uyghurs in China.

In an article in The Times on 22 October 2022, Lord Alton of Liverpool questioned whether it was wise to let China build an embassy at Royal Mint Court saying, "The idea that the Royal Mint should become a prime site for the promotion of the CCP is wrong. It will give them a great deal of prestige and I am sympathetic to the security issues and concerns from local residents. I think the secretary of state should call it in." The article followed news that during the 2022 clash at the Chinese Consulate in Manchester, Chinese diplomats had allegedly dragged a protester called Bob Chan by his hair into the consulate's grounds and assaulted him. In the same article, Dave Lake, chairman of the Royal Mint Court Residents Association (RMCRA) who has lived on the site since 1990 said, "all of a sudden, the estate has been bought by the Chinese and the CCP are our freeholders". He expressed concern adding, "It raises all sorts of questions. For example, if someone put up a poster supporting the local mayor, a Muslim, would they get a knock on the door from someone from the embassy?". Lake questioned whether diplomatic immunity would be extended to cover the 100 homes and commercial units on the land and was concerned that neither the leaseholders nor their housing association, Metropolitan Thames Valley Housing, had any influence over the new freeholder.

==== Involvement of Sir Edward Lister ====
On 7 February 2021, The Sunday Times revealed that Edward Lister, an advisor to Boris Johnson, helped the Chinese Government to negotiate the purchase of Royal Mint Court from Delancey. The article stated that Lister had acted on behalf of the British Government – while being paid by both the property company representing Beijing and the developer that sold the 5.4 acre freehold site to them for £255 million. When Johnson was Foreign Secretary, he appointed Lister to lead talks with the Chinese Government over its proposed purchase of Royal Mint Court. It was later alleged that Lister had advised on planning law at the same time as being employed by two property development firms including Delancey.

The Chinese Embassy website reported on a meeting at the Chinese Embassy on 7 November 2018 between Chargé d'Affaires Zhu Quin and Lister in his capacity as a Non-Executive Director of the Foreign, Commonwealth and Development Office, to exchange views with him on the construction of the diplomatic premises in both China and the UK. The article quoted Lister as saying that "the renovation and expansion project of the British Embassy in Beijing is one of the key building or renovation projects of the UK’s diplomatic missions overseas. The UK is willing to keep in close communication with China to make sure that their respective projects will make positive progress".

== Structures ==
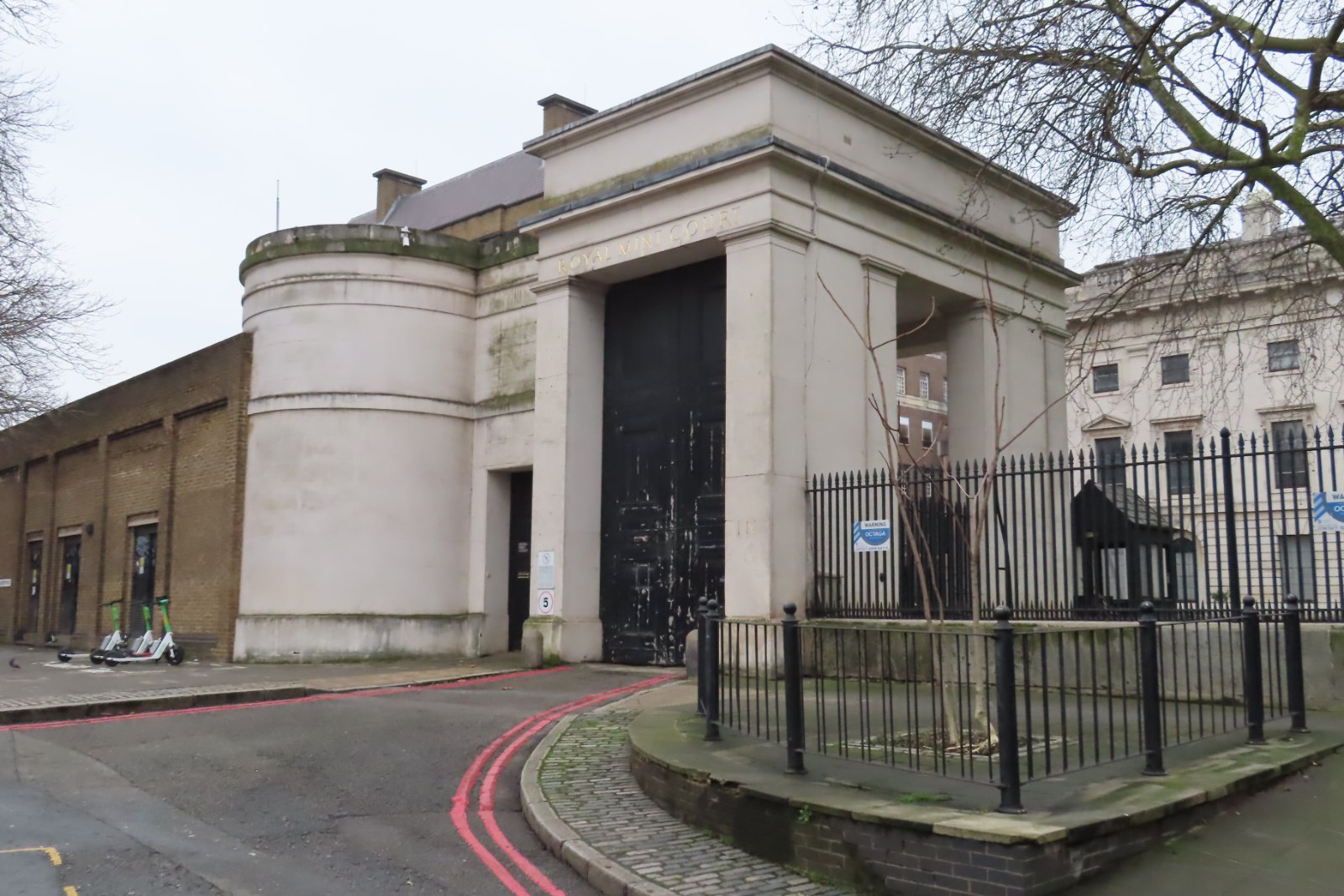
Entrance Lodge

The site of Royal Mint Court comprises three buildings, two of which are original 19th century creations for the Royal Mint. The third building is an interconnecting office complex built in the late 1980s after the mint relocated to Wales. There are also 100 residential apartments and three small commercial properties to the east of the site that are completely detached from the main site by a service road that runs from Royal Mint Street to East Smithfield. In addition to the buildings, there are two listed structures within the site's forecourt: a 19th-century entrance lodge built by Robert Smirke and a set of cast iron lamps on stone white plinths. and the partially exposed archaeological remains of the graves and abbey of St Mary de Graces.

=== Johnson Smirke Building ===
Designed in 1805 by James Johnson, the building was constructed between 1807 and 1812 by Robert Smirke after Johnson died, having never seen his design realised. In honour of both architects, the building was named the Johnson Smirke Building. Aiming to increase mint production, the building was designed for multiple purposes including space for new mint machinery, a bullion store, the mint's office and apartments for mint officials.

The long façade of the three-storey rectangular stone building has windows with Doric order running through the first and second floors. Above is a broad central pediment which displays the royal coat of arms engraved in stone with six columns below. The end bays are decorated with four pilasters. Due to its historic significance, the building became Grade II* listed on 27 September 1973.

=== Registry Building ===
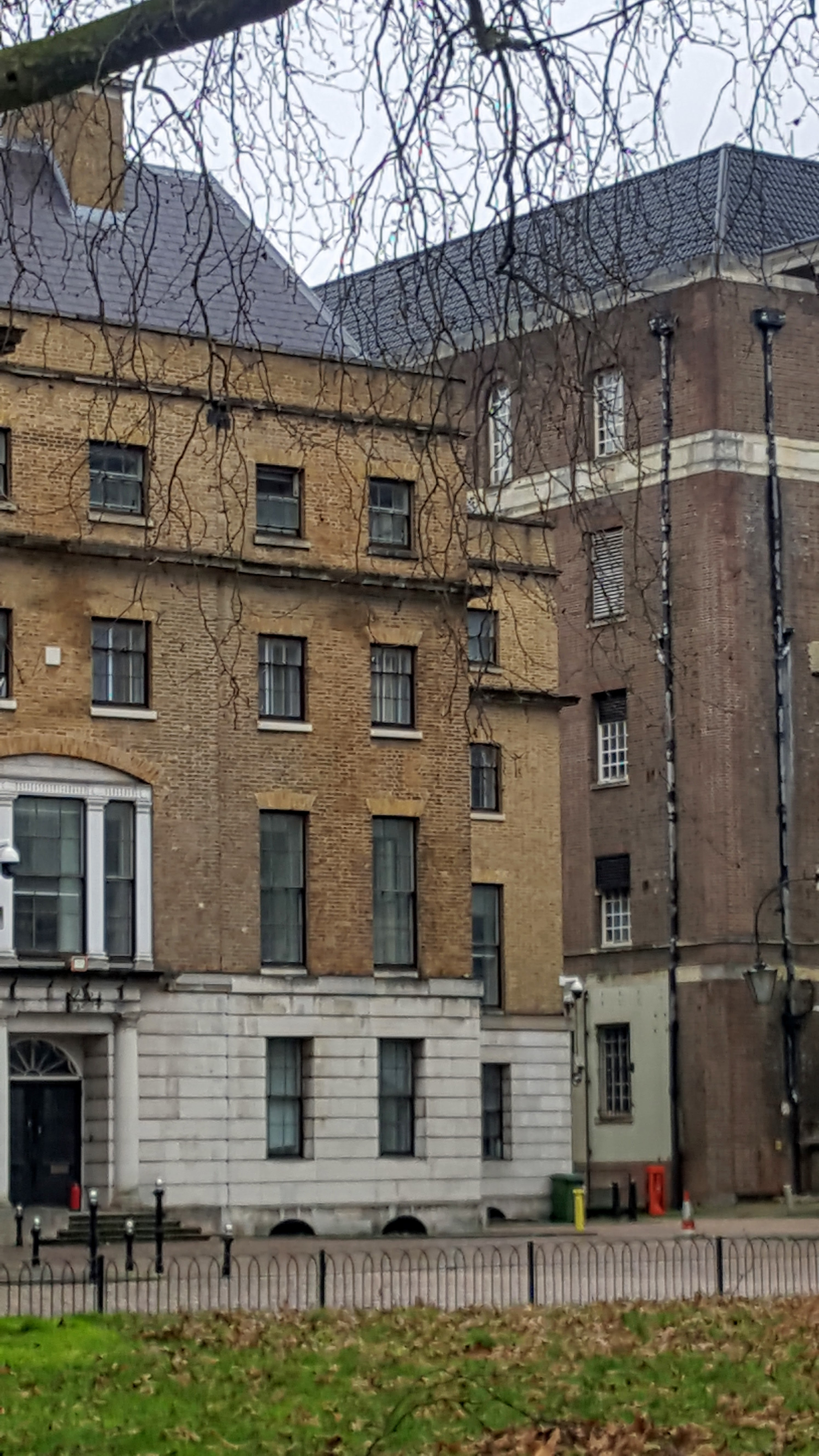
Registry Building (left)

Built around the same time as the Johnson Smirke Building, The Registry, also known as Seaman's Registry, was designed by James Johnson to house staff of the mint. The three-storey building includes an attic and basement with outer cladding that was added in the 1980s. On 15 April 1985 it became Grade II listed.

=== Murray House and Dexter House ===
Built in 1987 by architecture firm Sheppard Robson, the two connecting buildings make up a series of housing and office complexes.

=== St Mary Graces Court ===
Built in 1987 under a 126-year head lease granted by Queen Elizabeth II via the Crown Estate Commissioners, St Mary Graces Court comprises 100 residential apartments to the west of Cartwright Street and a block on East Smithfield and Royal Mint Street. The majority of these were sold as shared ownership and some buyers purchased a 100% share. There are also 3 commercial units and car parking spaces on the site. Under the original Leases, the Crown Estate was the Superior Landlord. The name derives from the Cistercian Abbey of St. Mary de Graces, Eastminster that once stood on the site.

=== Archaeological remains of the Cistercian abbey and graves ===
The site of the medieval Abbey was excavated between 1986 and 1988. The excavation revealed 420 burials and the remains of 389 individuals were analysed. One of the named burials was that of Sir Simon Burley, a high ranking and most influential man in the court of King Richard II. He was decapitated in 1388 for treason and his remains were buried in the Presbytery of St Mary Graces Abbey. Following excavation, parts of the walls of the abbey were left exposed beneath Murray House and these were accessible for public viewing via a path from East Smithfield. In 2017, planning permission was granted to Delancey to redevelop the site and this included increasing public access to Royal Mint Court by creating new pedestrian entrances from East Smithfield and Royal Mint Street.

On 16 December 2020, it was reported that local councillors have raised concerns about protection of the remains of the historic abbey and in December 2020, Historic England confirmed that the Greater London Archaeological Advisory Service was contacted for pre-application advice about the remains and graves beneath Royal Mint Court stating, "Any advice Historic England provide in pre-application stage is confidential" . However, Historic England added that, "the archaeology at the site was “highly important” and had been included in the same Tier 1 Archaeological Priority Area as the Tower of London and the former Royal Mint building itself is Grade II* listed". The report added that China's ambassador wrote to the borough's mayor John Biggs in November 2020 to say he believes councillors are “attempting to disrupt” the project.

== Chinese Embassy planning application ==
On 1 December 2022, the application was presented to the planning authority. Members of the Royal Mint Court Residents Association (RMCRA) and councillors expressed concern that the plans would receive approval. The RMRCA chairman David Lake was so fearful that he had written to King Charles III asking for residents' homes on the Chinese-owned land to be bought back by the Crown Estate. In an unexpected decision, Tower Hamlets council voted unanimously to reject planning permission. It came despite planning officials recommending that the new embassy be given consent. Councillors normally follow the recommendations of planning officials. Consent was refused on the grounds of a range of concerns including the possible impact of large protests at the site and safety to local residents following concerns raised by families living on the land owned by the Chinese government. Fearing the Tower Hamlets decision could be overruled by the Mayor of London or the UK government, the chairman of the RMCRA launched an appeal on a crowdfunding website to raise funds for professional legal advice for his residents. His appeal highlighted his fear that children and pensioners would become a human shield to protect the Chinese Embassy.

In August 2024, Deputy Prime Minister Angela Rayner delayed approval of the new embassy after the US and others raised concerns about rooms redacted from blueprints. In October 2024, Rayner 'called in' the planning application to allow for ministers to decide whether the plans for the new consulate could go ahead. The Chinese government refused to provide the UK with full blueprints of the proposed embassy, saying that requests for information about redacted areas were "inappropriate."

=== Protests ===
On 8 February 2025, more than 1,000 protesters gathered outside Royal Mint Court to oppose the proposed Chinese embassy. The demonstration included local residents, members of the Uyghur, Tibetan, and Hong Kong communities, Chinese dissidents, and politicians from both the Conservative and Labour parties. Protesters expressed concerns that the embassy could be used for espionage and to monitor dissidents, and that its location would disrupt traffic and pose security risks near the Tower of London. The rally was addressed by several prominent figures, including former security minister Tom Tugendhat, shadow justice secretary Robert Jenrick, former Conservative leader Iain Duncan Smith and Labour MP Blair McDougall. Tensions escalated during the demonstration, with clashes between protesters and police. The Metropolitan Police, which had previously objected to the embassy due to insufficient space for safe protests, arrested two individuals on suspicion of breaching Section 14 of the Public Order Act 1986. The protest led to temporary road closures and traffic disruptions in central London.

=== Approval ===
On 20 January, 2026, the new embassy was approved. Security Minister Dan Jarvis said he was "content any risks are being appropriately managed". It was confirmed Housing Secretary Steve Reed had given permission for the development to proceed. The decision was met with criticism from opposition parties including the Conservative party, the Liberal Democrats and Reform UK. The RMCRA appealed against the approval, and in April 2026 the High Court granted the RMCRA the right for a judicial review. The review was rejected in July 2026, but the RMCRA immediately said it would appeal.
