= The Prebendal School =

Coordinates: 50°50′11″N 0°46′57″W

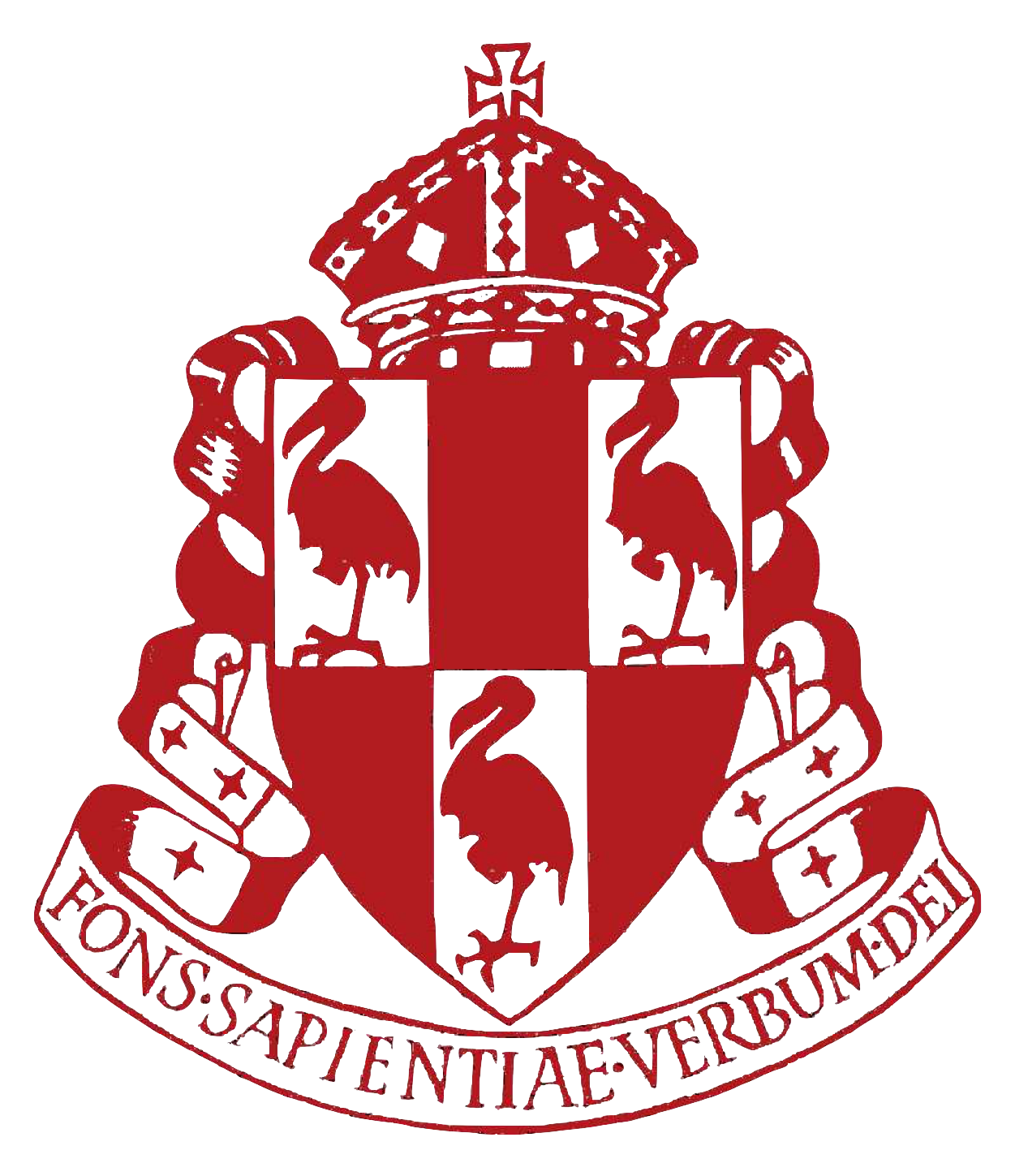
- West Sussex; England

Information
- Type: Preparatory; Private
- Motto: Latin: Fons Sapientiae Verbum Dei (The Word of God is the Fountain of Wisdom)
- Religious affiliation: Church of England
- Established: 1497; 529 years ago
- Founder: Bishop Edward Story
- Chair of Governors: Dean Edward Dowler
- Head: Alison Napier
- Gender: Mixed
- Age: 3 to 13
- Enrolment: ≈120
- Houses: 4
- Colour: Red
- Publication: The Prebendalian
- Former pupils: Old Prebendalians
- Website: http://prebendalschool.org.uk/

The Prebendal School is a private preparatory school in Chichester, situated adjacent to the Chichester Cathedral precinct. It is a boarding and day school educating the cathedral choristers. The school has ancient origins as the medieval cathedral song school at the thirteenth-century school house in West Street.

In 2020, The Telegraph named The Prebendal School as one of the best-value independent schools in the country. In January 2023, the school announced that its recent ISI inspection in November had found the school to be Excellent in all areas.

== History ==
The Prebendal is the oldest school in Sussex and probably dates back to the foundation of Chichester Cathedral in the 11th century when it was a 'song school', teaching and housing the choristers. It was later extended to admitting other boys from the city and neighbouring areas. In 1497, it was re-founded as a grammar school by the Bishop of Chichester, Edward Story, who also attached it to the Prebend of Highleigh in Chichester Cathedral, hence the name of the school.

The thirteenth-century school house with its narrow tower still stands in West Street.

Girls were introduced into the school in 1972. The school is now a co-educational, day and boarding preparatory school for children between 3 and 13 years of age.

Due to its financial position, exacerbated by the coronavirus pandemic, the school confirmed in April 2021 that it was seeking external financial support. In July 2021, it confirmed that it had been acquired by the Alpha Schools Group.

== Structure ==
The school consists of the Pre-Prep (Nursery to Year 2) and the Prep (Years 3–8). Each pupil is a member of a school house, which are named after former Bishops of Chichester. There is also a boarding house that accommodate up to 46 boarders. The school remains open for Choristers in the weeks prior to Christmas, Easter and the Southern Cathedrals Festival. The Nursery, Pelicans, is open throughout the normal school holidays.

== Academia ==
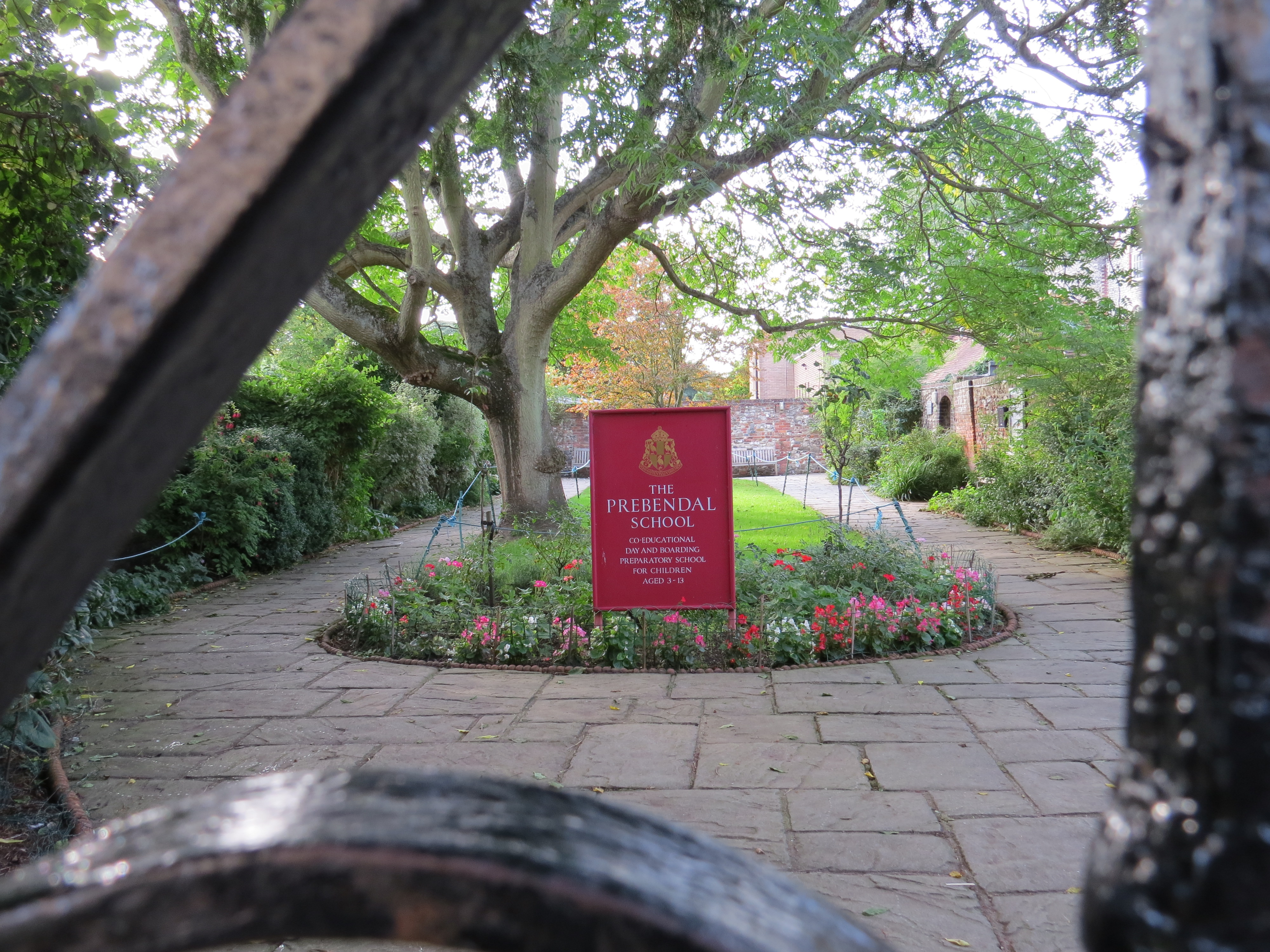
The Memorial Garden

Pupils are taught the Common Entrance or Common Academic Scholarship examination to senior independent schools, offered by the Independent Schools Examinations Board.

== Heads ==
The following list includes Heads of the school prior to its re-founding in 1497:

- 1121 John
- 1145 Peter
- 1148 Joseph
- 1180 John d'Aquila
- 1192 Galfridus Aquillon
- 1214 Hugh de Tournay
- 1222 Ralph de Neville
- 1227 Eustace de Leveland
- 1229 Thomas de Lichfield
- 12?? John Clymping
- 1248 John de Arundel
- 1256 William de Bracklesham
- 1280 William de Pagham
- 1288 John de Lacy
- 1330 Henry de Garland
- 1332 John Bishopstone
- 1362 Walter Bracklesham
- 1362 Henry Cookham
- 1367 Robert de Walton
- 1371 John de Kepston
- 13?? Thomas Romsey
- 1386 John Shillingford
- 1388 Lambert Threkingham
- 13?? Simon Russell
- 1396 Walter Meetford
- 1396 John Yernemouthe
- 1399 William Reed
- 1407 Robert Neel
- 1430 John Stopydon
- 143? John Morton
- 1439 John Faukes
- 14?? Thomas Gyldesburgh
- 1478 Edmund Lichfield
- 1483 John Brackenburgh
- 1496 Thomas Burwell
- 1497 John Wykley
- 1500 John Holt
- 1502 William Hone
- 1504 Nicholas Bradbridge
- 1521 John Goldyff
- 1523 William Freynd
- 1531 John Tychenor
- 1538 Anthony Clarke
- 1550 Thomas Garbard
- 1554 Augustine Curteys
- 1556 Robert Oking
- 1561 Matthew Myeres
- 1570 Henry Blackstone
- 1571 John Penven
- 1572 John Beeching
- 1578 George Buck
- 1582 John Sandford
- 1582 Edward Bragg
- 1591 William Sale
- 1594 Hugh Barker
- 1604 George Elgar
- 1642 George Collins
- 1660 Thomas Barter
- 1665 John Baguley
- 1669 Francis Bacon
- 1685 Robert Tupp
- 1701 Thomas Baker
- 1730 William Wade
- 1768 Richard Tireman
- 1776 John Atkinson
- 1784 David David
- 1797 John Stevens
- 1802 Moses Dodd
- 1808 George Bliss
- 1824 Charles Webber
- 1840 Thomas Brown
- 1879 Frederick G. Bennett
- 1912 William F. Pearce
- 1931 Arthur S. Duncan-Jones
- 1935 Philip C. Manwaring
- 1945 Philip E. Ellard-Handley
- 1951 Charles H. Sinclair
- 1953 Guy F. Hepburn
- 1969 Neville F. Ollerenshaw
- 1982 Godfrey C. Hall
- 2005 Timothy R. Cannell
- 2017 Louise Salmond Smith
- 2023 Alison Napier

== Old Prebendalians ==
Alumni are known as Old Prebendalians. Notable Old Prebendalians include:

- William Juxon (1582–1663), Archbishop of Canterbury (1660–1663)
- John Selden (1584–1654), jurist, philosopher and parliamentarian
- William Cawley (1602–1667), politician and regicide of Charles I
- William Collins (1721–1759), poet
- James Hurdis (1763–1801), clergyman and Professor of Poetry at Oxford University (1793–1801)
- Charles Gordon-Lennox, 5th Duke of Richmond (1791–1860), MP for Chichester (1812–1819) and Postmaster General (1830–1834)
- Horatio Nelson, 3rd Earl Nelson (1823–1913), politician
- Edward B. Titchener (1867–1927), psychologist who developed the theory of structuralism
- MacDonald Gill (1884–1947), graphic designer, cartographer, artist and architect
- Peter Hitchens (1951–), conservative journalist and author
- Rupert Holliday-Evans (1964–), actor
- Isaac Waddington (1999–), singer, pianist and finalist on the ninth series of Britain's Got Talent

== See also ==
- List of the oldest schools in the United Kingdom
- List of private schools in England
