= Eunan O'Neill =

Irish television presenter

Eunan O'Neill (born Newry, County Down, 12 August 1982) is a Northern Irish television presenter.

O'Neill, who grew up in Crossmaglen in County Armagh, holds a postgraduate degree in Broadcast Journalism from the University of Sheffield.

Since 2005, O'Neill has worked for the state-controlled Russian television network, Russia Today, and is one of the station's main news anchors. As of 2022, he was anchoring the station's international English language coverage.
