= Jamie Ritblat =

British businessman (born 1967)

- Born: James Ritblat; 18 February 1967 (age 59)
- Education: Eton College
- Alma mater: University of Bristol
- Employer: Delancey
- Known for: Property development
- Relatives: Sir John Ritblat (father)

James Ritblat (born 1967) is a British businessman. Ritblat worked for British Land, the company acquired by his father Sir John Ritblat, until 1995 when he left to start his own business, Delancey, of which he is the chairman and chief executive. James Ritblat and wholly owned offshore subsidiaries of Delancy appear in the Panama Papers database. In 1998, billionaire George Soros 's Quantum Realty Fund was reported to have taken a controlling shareholding in Delancey through a deal with Ritblat. In 2010, the Crown Estate sold Royal Mint Court freehold to DV4 (a subsidiary of Delancey incorporated in the BVI) in an off-market sale and in 2011, Delancey, with the Qatari ruling family, bought the Olympic Village used in the London 2012 Olympic Games.

== Early life and family ==
James Ritblat was born on 18 February 1967. His father, Sir John Ritblat, is chairman of British Land, one of the largest property companies in the United Kingdom.

Ritblat was educated at Eton College and graduated from the University of Bristol.

== Career ==
Ritblat founded Delancey, a property development firm, in 1995 after he left British Land. He serves as its chairman and chief executive. The firm was formerly quoted, but in 2001 went private again after a share buyback.

In 2011, Delancey, with the Qatari ruling family, bought the Olympic Village used in the London 2012 Olympic Games. This was followed by the acquisition by Delancey of quoted property company Minerva. The deal was seen by The Telegraph as Jamie Ritblat stepping out of the shadow of his father and becoming an independent player in the British property world. The paper commented, "Ritblat is emerging from the recession as a major influence in the Central London property market" and compared his deal-making to the techniques that his father used to build his own business: "Just as his father did in the downturns of the 20th century, he is playing a central role in the reshaping of the industry as distressed assets are unwound." The London Evening Standard commented, "A series of big deals including the purchase of the Olympic village – in a joint venture with Qatari Diar – has seen this behind-the-scenes son of Sir John begin to eclipse his father."

In February 2015, City A.M. reported that Ritblat's company was in talks to sell the Walbrook building in London for £600m, which they had owned since 2011.

When David Brudenell-Bruce, Earl of Cardigan lost a long court battle to prevent the sale of Tottenham House, Wiltshire, Ritblat was thought to have been the buyer in the £11.5 million transaction.

== Other appointments ==
Ritblat has served as a "lay member" of the College Council of King's College London since 2006. He is a governor of the Southbank Centre.
