= Alpha Plus Group =

English education company

- The logo of Alpha Plus Group
- Type: Private education public limited company
- Traded as: Alpha Plus Holdings plc
- Founded: 1931
- Headquarters: 50 Queen Anne Street, London, England
- Revenue: £108 million (2020)
- Net income: ▼£26.4 million (2020)
- Website: Official website

Alpha Plus Group is an English private education company which runs a network of pre-preparatory, preparatory and secondary independent schools, colleges and nurseries.

== History ==
The Group's origins date from the foundation in 1931 of DLD College ‘to provide tutoring for Oxbridge and Colonial Service entrance exams'. The College has moved campus five times and now occupies a building near Westminster Bridge, where it educates a diverse range of home and international students. Abbey College Manchester was established as a tutorial college in 1990 and now offers GCSE, Foundation and A level courses to local and international students. Abbey College Cambridge was founded in 1994.

In 2002, the group was acquired by Sovereign Capital and sold to DV4 Limited, advised by investment group Delancey in December 2007.

In June 2023, Alpha Plus Group was acquired by Inspired Education. In total, 17 Alpha Plus Independent UK Schools, including the prestigious Wetherby School, Pembridge Hall School for Girls and Chepstow House School in London, now form part of Inspired's group of 111 schools across 6 continents.

== Retail Bonds ==
The Group has issued £80 million retail bonds that were included in a list of High Risk retail bonds by Investors Chronicle in October 2019 and have traded below par in various occasions since September 2019 reaching a low of £61 in March 2020. The retail bonds are currently mainly secured against leasehold assets following a replacement that took place in December 2019 when the freehold assets were used as collateral for a loan that the parent company obtained from the Royal Bank of Scotland. Up-to-date bond performance is reflected in the appropriate channel.

== Controversies ==
=== Coronavirus Fee Discounts ===
During the March 2020 coronavirus lockdown, the Alpha Plus Group spiked controversy when poor communication and unannounced amendments confused parents of children who went to their schools.

The group originally informed the parents in a letter signed the company's CEO, Mr. Hanley-Browne, that fees would still be fully payable and no discount would be provided, contrary to the actions taken by other schools. The Financial Times recorded one parent saying "It’s the kind of behaviour you’d expect from a distressed hedge fund". As a result of the pressure the group changed its decision and wrote to parents saying it would cut summer fees by 20 per cent at its schools. The Group described this in its 2020 financial report as follows "It was quickly recognized that, no matter how good the remote learning provision may be, learning from home imposed increased demands on parents. the Group decided to offer a 20% discount on the summer term fees at all of its schools (40% for nursery age children)."

The Group stated in its 2020 financial report that no fee discounts were planned for the closing of schools during the spring term 2021.

=== Financial situation ===
The Group accumulated approximately £55 million of losses during the 2016-2020 period (£1.4 million in 2016, £7.2 million in 2017, £10.4 million in 2018, £9.9m million in 2019 and $26.4 million in 2020). Those losses together with the modest decrease in pupil numbers (98 fewer in four years) have led to a controversy about the Group's financial model as well as about its financial viability and ability to repay its debts that has been reported in the financial press.

The Group's equity fell during that same period from £31.4 million in 2015 to £4.6 million in 2019. The Group stated its intention of changing its accounting methods and to adopt the revaluation model following an informal external professional valuation. The Group had a negative working capital of £60 million as at August 2019 and therefore had a significant working capital deficiency. Group revenue in the year ended 31 August 2019 was 6% higher than in the previous year. Reported EBITDA increased to £6.1m (2018:£2.7m).

=== Trade unions ===
Alpha Plus Group consulted with teaching staff in thirteen of its schools about a proposal to exit from the TPS in August 2019. The consultation closed in April 2019 and the Group withdrew from the TPS in August 2019. All teachers previously enrolled in the TPS re-enrolled in the Group's Personal Pension Plan. No contracts were terminated as a result of the Group's exit from the TPS and there were no strikes despite the unions' encouragement.

Following the increase in pension employer's pension contributions, a further 107 independent schools withdrew from the Teachers' Pension Scheme.

At the time of the consultation in 2019, representatives of the National Education Union, that represents several hundred teachers across the independent schools that make up the Group, handed out leaflets outside the Group's schools describing the situation of the teachers following the refusal by the group to either negotiate or meet the union in relation to the Group's plan of exiting the Teachers' Pension Scheme.

Glenn Kelly, the union's regional officer dealing with the issue, told the Financial Times that 'It's not my usual day-to-day work — in leafy Notting Hill where children are dropped off by nannies' and added that 'it's a brutal response from an employer that you wouldn't expect in education'".

The Group stated: "Earlier this year, it was confirmed that employer contributions into the Teachers’ Pension Scheme ("TPS") would increase from 16.48% to 23.6% of teachers’ salaries with effect from 1 September 2019. This would increase the Group's pension costs by approximately £1.1m per annum."

== Schools ==
- The Prebendal School, Chichester

== Colleges ==
- Abbey DLD Colleges
  - Abbey College, Cambridge
  - Abbey College, Manchester
  - DLD College, London
