= Delancey (company) =

British property development company

Delancey Real Estate Asset Management Limited is a British property development company that has wholly owned subsidiaries such as DV4 based in offshore jurisdictions. The billionaire George Soros invested in the company in 1998. The company appears in the Panama papers. In 2011, the Qatari ruling family bought the Olympic Village used in the London 2012 Olympic Games. The area has been renamed the East Village.

== History ==
The firm was founded by Jamie Ritblat, son of Sir John Ritblat, after he left British Land in 1995. In 2000, The Guardian reported that Delancey Estates, then a quoted George Soros-backed commercial real estate company, could take itself private. The first major office investment was reported to be 6 Chesterfield Gardens, London W1 for £30m in 2003 and Soros's Morston Nominees was said to be the largest shareholder in Delancey's old Tribeca fund.

It was formerly quoted, but in 2001 went private again after a share buyback.

The billionaire George Soros is an investor in British Land and Delancey. In 1994, G Soros Realty Investors, acquired £1.34 million British Land shares at 298p from a Quantum Fund holding. British Land did not disclose this, but did reveal that John Ritblat received 2 million shares at cost from the Quantum Fund. When the deal was disclosed in June 1993, Mr Ritblat's share issuance was defended as being an incentive for British Land to perform. An early deal for Soros and Ritblat was for the Broadgate complex in the City of London in 1994. Sir John Ritblat acquired British Land from Jim Slater in 1970 for £1m, and retired as chairman in 2006.

In 2005, Soros embarked on a £2bn London property spree through his investments Delancey which was selling off commercial real estate and also sold its stake in Mapeley, the off-shore company that owned and managed Inland Revenue offices. George Soros was also investing in other companies including a big stake in one of China's largest airlines. The National Audit Office and Parliamentarians were highly critical of the Inland Revenue's decision to sell over 600 buildings to a Bermuda-based company and misleading the public. Revenue chairman Sir Nicholas Montagu later admitted his organisation wrongly announced the properties were sold to a UK firm. There was further public concern in 2020 when a £6.5m Government payment was made to a company in a tax haven.

== Recent transactions ==
In 2010, the Crown Estate sold the Freehold and buildings of Royal Mint Court to DV4, wholly owned subsidiary of Delancey-based offshore inn the British Virgin Islands. This was an off market sale that was kept confidential and resulted in serious allegations being made when official documents were published in 2018 following a Freedom of Information request.

In May 2015, Minerva, the real estate investment and development group taken private by funds owned by Ares Management and Delancey, revealed it had sold the Walbrook Building in the City of London to Taiwan-based Cathay Life for a fee of £575 million.

In April 2015, Delancey formed a joint venture with LRC Group in a project to redevelop the Royal Mint Court office near the Tower of London. The deal followed lengthy negotiations after LRC acquired a loan secured on the site's leasehold in May 2014. Delancey's DV4 fund had owned the freehold interest since 2010.

In February 2015, Delancey revealed it was poised to sell its 102,000 square foot office at scheme at Orchard Brae House in Edinburgh as the firm looked to capitalise on numerous leasing deals at the building in the preceding 12 months. In January 2015, Delancey and commercial property developer Barwood partnered to launch a new industrial and logistics developer, with the aim of providing competition to its rival firms like SEGRO and Prologis in the sheds market.

In May 2012, Delancey advised Brazilian business magnate Moise Safra on his £500 million purchase of an office building in London's financial district from the consortium, One Plantation Place Unit Trust.

In 2011, Delancey and Qatari-owned Qatar Diar acquired 1,400 apartments in the Olympic Village area near the venue of the London 2012 Olympics for a fee of £557 million. The acquisition attracted some controversy as it occurred during the time of the economic crisis, with the property market at a low point. Built to house 23,000 athletes and officials during the games, the properties were sold to Delancey and Qatar Diar before the games had even started.

Also during the Olympics, Delancey's joint venture with Infinity SDC, ICITY, was contracted to convert the Olympic broadcast and press centre into a tech hub for corporations, with BT Group as the first major tenant.
