= List of schools in the Republic of Ireland =

This is a list of notable schools in the Republic of Ireland, listed by county. It includes primary and secondary schools that are publicly funded, private, or fee-paying institutions across all counties of the Republic of Ireland. This list excludes special education centers and pre-schools.

== County Carlow ==
=== Secondary schools ===
- St. Leo's College, Carlow
- St. Mary's Knockbeg College

== County Cavan ==
=== Secondary schools ===
- Bailieborough Community School, Bailieborough
- Ballyhaise College, Ballyhaise
- Virginia College, Virginia
- St. Patrick's College, Cavan

== County Clare ==
=== Primary schools ===
- Ballycar National School, Newmarket-on-Fergus
- Ennis National School, Ennis

=== Secondary schools ===
- C.B.S. Secondary School, Ennistymon
- Rice College, Ennis
- St Anne's Community College, Killaloe
- St Flannan's College, Ennis
- St. Joseph's Secondary School, Tulla

== County Cork ==
=== Primary schools ===
- Gurrane National School, Crossbarry
- Scoil an Chroí Ró Naofa, Castletownbere
- Scoil an Spioraid Naoimh, Bishopstown
- Scoil Mhuire Fatima Primary School, Cork

=== Secondary schools ===
- Ashton School, Cork
- Bandon Grammar School, Bandon
- Bishopstown Community School, Bishopstown
- Boherbue Comprehensive School, Boherbue
- Christian Brothers College, Cork
- C.B.S. Charleville, Charleville
- Coachford College, Coachford
- Coláiste an Phiarsaigh, Glanmire
- Coláiste an Spioraid Naoimh, Bishopstown
- Colaiste Choilm, Ballincollig
- Coláiste Chríost Rí, Turners Cross, Cork
- Colaiste Ghobnatan, Ballyvourney
- Davis College, Summerhill
- Douglas Community School, Douglas
- Glanmire Community College, Glanmire
- Kinsale Community School, Kinsale
- Mater Dei Academy, Cork
- Midleton CBS Secondary School, Midleton
- Midleton College, Midleton
- Mount Mercy College, Bishopstown
- North Monastery, Cork
- Presentation Brothers College, Cork
- St. Angela's College, Cork
- St. Colman's College, Fermoy
- St Colman's Community College, Midleton
- St. Francis College, Rochestown
- St. Mary's Secondary School, Charleville
- St. Patrick's School, Cork
- St. Peter's Community School, Passage West
- Scoil Mhuire, Cork
- Youghal International College, Youghal

== County Donegal ==
=== Primary schools ===
- Glenswilly National School, Breenagh
- Scoil Colmcille, Letterkenny

=== Secondary schools ===
- Abbey Vocational School, Donegal
- Carndonagh Community School, Carndonagh
- Coláiste Ailigh, Letterkenny
- Coláiste Chineál Eoghain, Buncrana
- De La Salle College, Ballyshannon
- Deele College, Raphoe
- Moville Community College, Moville
- Pobalscoil Chloich Cheannfhaola, Falcarragh
- Pobalscoil Ghaoth Dobhair, Gweedore
- St Eunan's College, Letterkenny
- Scoil Mhuire, Buncrana

== County Galway ==
=== Primary schools ===
- Aillebrack National School, Aillebrack
- Creagh National School, Ballinasloe
- St. Patrick's Primary School, Tuam

=== Secondary schools ===
- Archbishop McHale College, Tuam
- Calasanctius College, Oranmore
- Clonfert College, Ballinasloe
- Coláiste Bhaile Chláir, Claregalway
- Coláiste Éinde, Salthill
- Coláiste Iognáid, Galway
- Coláiste Muire Máthair, Galway
- Coláiste na Coiribe, Knocknacarra
- Galway Community College, Wellpark
- Gort Community School, Gort
- Presentation College, Headford
- Presentation College, Athenry
- St Jarlath's College, Tuam
- St Joseph's Patrician College, Nun's Island
- St. Raphael's College, Loughrea

== County Kerry ==
=== Secondary schools ===
- Coláiste na Sceilge, Cahersiveen
- Mercy Secondary School, Mounthawk, Tralee
- St. Brendan's College, Killarney
- St Mary's CBS, Tralee
- St. Michael's College, Listowel

== County Kildare ==
=== Secondary schools ===
- Clongowes Wood College, Clane
- Coláiste Chiaráin, Leixlip
- Coláiste Lorcáin, Castledermot
- Confey College, Leixlip
- Cross and Passion College, Kilcullen
- Gaelcholáiste Chill Dara, Naas
- Kildare Town Community School, Kildare
- Maynooth Post Primary School, Maynooth
- Naas C.B.S., Naas
- Newbridge College, Newbridge
- Patrician Secondary School, Newbridge
- Salesian College, Celbridge
- Scoil Mhuire, Clane
- St Wolstan's Community School, Celbridge

== County Kilkenny ==
=== Secondary schools ===
- CBC Kilkenny, Kilkenny
- Kilkenny College, Kilkenny
- Loreto Secondary School, Kilkenny
- Presentation Secondary School, Kilkenny
- St Kieran's College, Kilkenny
- Scoil Aireagail, Ballyhale

== County Leitrim ==
=== Secondary schools ===
- Mohill Community College, Mohill

== County Limerick ==
=== Primary schools ===
- Milford National School, Castletroy

=== Secondary schools ===
- Ardscoil Rís, Limerick
- Castletroy College, Castletroy
- CBS Sexton Street, Limerick
- Coláiste Íde agus Iosef, Abbeyfeale
- Crescent College, Dooradoyle
- Glenstal Abbey School, Murroe
- Laurel Hill Coláiste, Limerick
- St Munchin's College, Limerick
- Salesian Secondary College, Pallaskenry
- Villiers School, Limerick

== County Laois ==
- Mountrath Community School, Mountrath

== County Longford ==
=== Secondary schools ===
- Scoil Mhuire, Longford

== County Louth ==
=== Secondary schools ===
- Ardee Community School, Ardee
- Coláiste Rís, Dundalk
- De La Salle College, Dundalk
- Drogheda Grammar School, Drogheda
- Dundalk Grammar School, Dundalk
- St. Mary's College, Dundalk
- St. Louis Secondary School, Dundalk
- St. Oliver's Community College, Drogheda

== County Mayo ==
=== Secondary schools ===
- Ballinrobe Community School, Ballinrobe
- Coláiste Pobail Acla, Corraun Peninsula
- Davitt College, Castlebar
- Gortnor Abbey, Crossmolina
- Mount St. Michaels, Claremorris
- St. Colman's College, Claremorris
- St. Gerald's College, Castlebar
- St Muredach's College, Ballina
- Sancta Maria College, Louisburgh
- Tourmakeady College, Tourmakeady

== County Meath ==
=== Secondary schools ===
- Coláiste na hInse, Bettystown
- Gormanston College, Gormanston
- Loreto Secondary School, Navan
- St. Joseph's Secondary School, Navan
- St Patrick's Classical School, Navan
- St. Peter's College, Dunboyne
- St. Oliver Post Primary School, Oldcastle

== County Monaghan ==
=== Secondary schools ===
- St Macartan's College, Monaghan

== County Offaly ==
=== Secondary schools ===
- Cistercian College, Roscrea
- St Brendan's Community School, Birr

== County Roscommon ==
=== Secondary schools ===
- CBS Roscommon, Roscommon
- Coláiste Chiaráin, Athlone
- St Nathy's College, Ballaghadereen

== County Sligo ==
=== Secondary schools ===
- Mercy College, Sligo
- Sligo Grammar School, Sligo
- Summerhill College, Sligo
- Ursuline College, Sligo

== County Tipperary ==
=== Primary schools ===
- Gaelscoil Aonach Urmhumhan, Nenagh

=== Secondary schools ===
- The Abbey School, Tipperary
- Cashel Community School, Cashel
- CBS High School, Clonmel
- CBS Thurles, Thurles
- Our Lady's Secondary School, Templemore
- Presentation Secondary School, Clonmel
- Rockwell College, Cashel
- St. Joseph's CBS, Nenagh

== County Waterford ==
=== Primary schools ===
- Mount Sion Primary School, Waterford
- Waterpark National School, Waterford

=== Secondary schools ===
- Ard Scoil na nDéise, Dungarvan
- Ardscoil Na Mara, Tramore
- Blackwater Community School, Lismore
- De La Salle College, Waterford
- Dungarvan CBS, Dungarvan
- Dungarvan College, Dungarvan
- Newtown School, Waterford
- St. Augustine's College, Dungarvan
- Waterpark College, Waterford

== County Westmeath ==
=== Secondary schools ===
- Athlone Community College, Athlone
- Coláiste Mhuire, Mullingar
- Loreto College, Mullingar
- Marist College, Athlone
- St Finian's College, Mullingar
- Wilson's Hospital School, Multyfarnham

== County Wexford ==
=== Primary schools ===
.Kilmyshall National School, Kilmyshall

=== Secondary schools ===
- Bridgetown Vocational College, Bridgetown
- Bunclody Community College, Bunclody
- Coláiste Bríde, Enniscorthy
- FCJ Secondary School, Bunclody
- Gorey Community School, Gorey
- Good Counsel College, New Ross
- St. Peter's College, Wexford

== County Wicklow ==
=== Primary schools ===
- Saint Cronan's Boys' National School, Bray
- St. Gerard's School, Bray
- Scoil Chualann, Bray

=== Secondary schools ===
- Coláiste Chraobh Abhann, Kilcoole
- Coláiste Ráithín, Bray
- Gaelcholáiste na Mara, Arklow
- Powerscourt National School, Enniskerry
- Presentation College, Bray
- St. Gerard's School, Bray
- Scoil Chonglais, Baltinglass
- St. David's Holy Faith Secondary School, Greystones
- Temple Carrig School, Greystones
- Woodbrook College, Bray

== See also ==
- Education in the Republic of Ireland
- List of Catholic schools in Ireland by religious order
- List of fee-paying schools in Ireland
- List of schools in Northern Ireland
- List of higher education institutions in the Republic of Ireland
