= Connacht Cup =

The Connacht Cup may refer to a number of sporting competitions played in the Irish province of Connacht, also known as Connaught. These competitions may also be referred to as the Connaught Cup.

- Connacht Junior Cup (association football)
- Connacht Senior Cup (association football)
- Connacht Senior League Challenge Cup, an association football cup competition.
- Connacht Gold Cup, the league cup of the Mayo Association Football League.
- Connacht Senior Cup (rugby union)
- Connacht Schools Rugby Senior Cup, a rugby union competition.
- Connacht Schools Junior Cup, a rugby union competition.
- Connacht Railway Cup, former Gaelic football competition.
- Michael Byrne Cup, an association football cup competition, formerly known as the Connacht Champions Cup

== See also ==
- Connacht Senior Cup (disambiguation)
- Connaught Cup (disambiguation)
