= Connacht Schools Junior Cup =

Under-age rugby union competition in Ireland

- Sport: Rugby Union
- Founded: 1913
- No. of teams: 7 (season 2023-24)
- Most recent champion: Sligo Grammar School (2026)
- Most titles: Garbally College; 42

The Connacht Schools Junior Challenge Cup is an under-age rugby union competition for schools affiliated to the Connacht Branch of the IRFU.

Competition is confined to students under the age of 16. The final is held in March each year in the Galway Sportsgrounds. It is usually seen as a good forecast as who will win the Connacht Schools Senior Cup in the following years.

Garbally College have been the most successful school in the competition lifting the cup 42 times. They are followed by St Joseph's College, Galway (10 times), Sligo Grammar School (7 times), Coláiste Iognáid, Marist College, Athlone and Ranelagh College (4 times) and Calasanctius College, Oranmore (2 times)

Marist College, Athlone have been the most successful team since the turn of the millennium winning the Junior cup Nine times (2000, 2002, 2005, 2007, 2013, 2016 ,2018, 2022, 2024).

== Competition structure ==
The Connacht Rugby Schools Cup is a three tier competition.

=== Junior Cup [Junior A Cup] ===
The premier competition played by the strongest rugby playing schools in the region. Current competition format is two pools [A & B] of three teams playing each other round robin. The Winners & Runner Up in each pool proceeding to the Semi-Finals.

- Winner Pool A vs Runner Up Pool B
- Winner Pool B vs Runner Up Pool A

The two other tiers cater for schools who cannot consistently compete at Junior Cup level by reason of playing population or experience.

In total 30 Schools representing all five provincial counties participated in the various Connacht Rugby Junior Schools Cups in 2019.

=== Connacht Junior Development Cup [Junior B Cup] ===
Is the Second Tier Competition for schools with established Rugby programs but who due to lower playing numbers or do not have the high level of population experience to consistently compete at Junior Cup Level.
Nine schools compete in three pools of three, leading to semi-finals and a final.

=== Connacht Junior Emerging Cup [Junior C Cup] ===
Is the Third Tier Competition for Schools who have recently introduced Rugby programs within their schools.
Nine schools compete in three pools of three, leading to semi-finals and a final.

The target is for schools to establish themselves within the lowest tier initially, and progress through to the highest tier.

== Performance by School ==
School	Outright Titles	Shared Titles	Runners-up +1	Total Finals +2	Last Title
Garbally College (1)	43		7	50	2019
St. Josephs College Galway (The Bish)	10	1	2	13	1991
Marist College, Athlone	9		4	13	2024
Sligo Grammar School	8	1	4	13	2026
Colaiste Iognaid (The Jes)	4		6	10	1987
Ranelagh College, Athlone	4			4	1929
Rice College	2		1	3	2012
Portumna Community School	2		1	3	2001
Calasanctius College, Oranmore	2		1	3	2010
Galway Grammar School	2			2	1958
CBS Roscommon	2		1	3	2020
Summerhill College, Sligo	1		2	3	2023
St Geralds College, Castlebar	1			1	2014
Clifden Community School	1			1	1976
Galway Vocational School	1			1	1969
St Muiredachs College, Ballina			2	3	N/A

+1 Since 1989 (Excluding 1992-4)
+2 Only counting wins and losing finals since 1989
Last Updated 15/03/2023

Notes:

- (1) Now Clonfert College.

== Results ==
=== 1910 ===
- 1915 Galway Grammar School
- 1916 Garbally College
- 1917 Ranelagh, Athlone
- 1918 Colaiste Iognaid
- 1919 Ranelagh, Athlone

=== 1920 ===
- 1920 Suspended
- 1921 Suspended
- 1922 Suspended
- 1923 Suspended
- 1924 St Josephs College, Galway
- 1925 Garbally College
- 1926 Ranelagh, Athlone
- 1927 Garbally College
- 1928 St Josephs College, Galway
- 1929 Ranelagh, Athlone

=== 1930 ===
- 1930 St Josephs College, Galway
- 1931 Garbally College
- 1932 Suspended
- 1933 Suspended
- 1934 Garbally College
- 1935 Sligo Grammar School
- 1936 Suspended
- 1937 Garbally College
- 1938 Garbally College
- 1939 Garbally College

=== 1940 ===
- 1940 Garbally College
- 1941 Garbally College
- 1942 Suspended
- 1943 Suspended
- 1944 Suspended
- 1945 Suspended
- 1946 Suspended
- 1947 Suspended
- 1948 Suspended
- 1949 Garbally College

=== 1950 ===
- 1950 Garbally College
- 1951 Garbally College
- 1952 Garbally College
- 1953 Garbally College
- 1954 Garbally College
- 1955 Garbally College
- 1956 Garbally College
- 1957 Garbally College
- 1958 Galway Grammar School
- 1959 Sligo Grammar School

=== 1960 ===
- 1960 St. Joseph's College, Galway
- 1961 Sligo Grammar School/ St Josephs College, Galway
- 1962 Sligo Grammar School
- 1963 St Josephs College, Galway
- 1964 St Josephs College, Galway
- 1965 Suspended
- 1966 Sligo Grammar School
- 1967 Suspended
- 1968 Suspended
- 1969 Galway Vocational School

=== 1970 ===
- 1970 Garbally College
- 1971 Garbally College
- 1972 Garbally College
- 1973 Garbally College
- 1974 Garbally College
- 1975 St Josephs College, Galway
- 1976 Clifden Community School
- 1977 Garbally College
- 1978 Colaiste Iognaid
- 1979 Garbally College

=== 1980 ===
- 1980 Garbally College
- 1981 Colaiste Iognaid
- 1982 Garbally College
- 1983 Garbally College
- 1984 Garbally College
- 1985 Garbally College
- 1986 St. Joseph's College, Galway (The Bish)
- 1987 Colaiste Iognaid
- 1988 Garbally College
- 1989 Sligo Grammar School beat Colaiste Iognaid

=== 1990 ===
- 1990 St Josephs College, Galway beat Garbally College
- 1991 St Josephs College, Galway
- 1992 Garbally College
- 1993 Garbally College
- 1994 Garbally College
- 1995 Garbally College beat Marist College, Athlone
- 1996 Garbally College beat St Josephs College, Galway
- 1997 Portumna Community School beat St Muredach's College, Ballina
- 1998 Garbally College beat Portumna Community School
- 1999 Garbally College beat Colaiste Iognaid

=== 2000 ===
- 2000 Marist College, Athlone beat Garbally College
- 2001 Portumna Community School beat Sligo Grammar School
- 2002 Marist College, Athlone beat Garbally College
- 2003 Sligo Grammar School beat Garbally College
- 2004 Garbally College beat Marist College, Athlone
- 2005 Marist College, Athlone beat Summerhill College, Sligo
- 2006 Garbally College beat Colaiste Iognaid by 20-12
- 2007 Marist College, Athlone beat Garbally College by 10 - 6
- 2008 Sligo Grammar School beat Marist College, Athlone by 8 - 5
- 2009 Calasanctius College, Oranmore beat Summerhill College, Sligo by 20 - 15

=== 2010 ===
- 2010 Calasanctius College, Oranmore beat Rice College by 17-5
- 2011 Rice College, Westport beat Calasanctius College, Oranmore by 26-18
- 2012 Rice College, Westport beat Sligo Grammar School by 6 - 3 (Replay after 10-10 draw on 13/03/12)
- 2013 Marist College, Athlone beat Sligo Grammar School by 22 - 8
- 2014 St. Gerald's College, Castlebar beat CBS Roscommon 36 - 22
- 2015 CBS Roscommon beat Coláiste Iognáid, Galway 36 - 0
- 2016 Marist College, Athlone beat Garbally College by 25 - 0
- 2017 Garbally College, Ballinasloe beat Colaiste Iognaid by 17-13
- 2018 Marist College, Athlone beat Garbally College by 20-17
- 2019 Garbally College, Ballinasloe beat Colaiste Iognaid by 22 – 15.

=== 2020 ===
- 2020 CBS Roscommon beat St Muredach's College, Ballina by 12-5
- 2021 - Suspended due to COVID-19 restrictions.
- 2022 Marist College, Athlone beat Sligo Grammar School by 10-7
- 2023 Summerhill College, Sligo beat Marist College, Athlone by 18-3
- 2024 Marist College, Athlone beat Sligo Grammar School by 22-14 [Fixture doubled as Junior League Final also]
- 2025 Marist College, Athlone beat Sligo Grammar School 31-29 (After 15-15 draw)
- 2026 Sligo Grammar School beat St Joseph's College, Galway 25-7

== Other Cup Competitions ==
=== Junior Development Cup [Junior B Cup] ===
==== 2010 ====
- 2010 Clifden CS beat Rice College by 13-7
- 2011 Sligo Grammar School beat St. Geralds College, Castlebar by 10-5
- 2012 Marist College, Athlone beat Roscommon CBS by 17-5
- 2013 Gallen Community School, Ferbane beat Coláiste Iognáid, Galway by 13-7
- 2014 Gallen Community School, Ferbane beat Gortnor Abbey by 32-3
- 2015
- 2016
- 2017 Calasanctius College beat Coláiste Bhaile Chláir, Claregalway by 19-16
- 2018 Presentation College, Athenry beat St. Jarlath's College, Tuam by 30-5
- 2019 St. Jarlath's College, Tuam beat Presentation College, Athenry by 22-15

==== 2020 ====
- 2020 Athlone Community College & Coláiste Éinde, Galway - Shared due to COVID-19 restrictions.
- 2021 No Competition due to COVID-19 Pandemic
- 2022 Coláiste Bhaile Chláir beat Coláiste Éinde, Galway by 15-12
- 2023 Gort CS beat Coláiste Éinde, Galway by 13-10
- 2024 Presentation College, Athenry beat Colaiste Bhaile Chlair by 23-5.
- 2025 Rice College, Westport beat Presentation College, Athenry by 26-10

=== Junior Emerging Cup [Junior C Cup] ===
- 2008 St Josephs College, Galway) beat Coláiste Iognáid (The Jes)
- 2009 Coláiste Éinde, Galway beat Coláiste Mhuire, Ballygar by 15-11

==== 2010 ====
- 2010 Calasanctius College, Oranmore beat Coláiste Iognáid, Galway (The Jes) By 8-6
- 2011 Coláiste Iognáid, Galway (The Jes) beat St Josephs College, Galway)
- 2012 St Josephs College, Galway beat Coláiste Éinde, Galway
- 2013 St Josephs College, Galway beat Coláiste Éinde, Galway
- 2014
- 2015 St. Jarlath's College, Tuam beat St Tiernan's College, Crossmolina by 19-14
- 2016
- 2017 Abbey Community College Boyle beat St Joseph's, Foxford by 24-18
- 2018 Abbey Community College Boyle beat St Joseph's, Foxford by 8-5
- 2019 Athlone Community College beat Scoil Chuimsiteach Chiarain, Carraroe by 28-0

==== 2020 ====
- 2020 Sancta Maria College, Louisburgh & Jesus & Mary Secondary School, Enniscrone - Shared due to COVID-19 restrictions.
- 2021 No Competition due to COVID-19 Pandemic
- 2022 Gort CS beat St. Raphael's College, Loughrea by 19-5
- 2023 St. Jarlath's College, Tuam beat Jesus & Mary Secondary School, Enniscrone by 20-10.

== Other Competitions ==
=== 2000 ===
- 2005 Garbally College beat Coláiste Iognáid, Galway by 15-13
- 2006
- 2007 Shared between Marist College, Athlone and Cilfden C.S
- 2008
- 2009 Calasanctius College, Oranmore beat Sligo Grammar School by 7-0

=== 2010 ===
- 2010 The Bish beat Marist College, Athlone
- 2011 Sligo Grammar School
- 2017 Garbally College beat Marist College, Athlone by 32-05
- 2018 Garbally College beat Marist College, Athlone by 31-17
- 2019 CBS Roscommon beat Garbally College, Ballinasloe by 15-7

=== 2020 ===
- 2020 - No Competition due to COVID-19 restrictions.
- 2021 - Marist College, Athlone beat St Josephs College, Galway The Bish by 31-24
- 2022 - Sligo Grammar School beat Marist College, Athlone by 27-7
- 2023 - Marist College, Athlone drew with Sligo Grammar School 12-12
- 2024 - Marist College, Athlone beat Sligo Grammar School by 22-14 [Fixture doubled as Junior Cup Final also]
- 2025 - Sligo Grammar School beat St Josephs College, Galway The Bish by 24-20

== See also ==
- Connacht Rugby
- Connacht Schools Senior Cup
- Ulster Schools Junior Cup
- Munster Schools Junior Cup
- Leinster Schools Junior Cup
