= Connaught Cup =

== Canada ==
The Connaught Cup may refer to a number of sporting competitions named after Prince Arthur, Duke of Connaught who served as Governor General of Canada from 1911 to 1916:

- Connaught Cup Stakes, a horse-racing competition
- Challenge Trophy, an association football competition formerly known as the Connaught Cup.

== Ireland ==
The Connaught Cup may refer to a number of sporting competitions played in the Irish province of Connacht, also known as Connaught.

- Connacht Junior Cup (association football)
- Connacht Senior Cup (association football)
- Connacht Senior League Challenge Cup, an association football cup competition
- Connacht Gold Cup, the league cup of the Mayo Association Football League
- Connacht Senior Cup (rugby union)
- Connacht Schools Rugby Senior Cup, a rugby union competition
- Connacht Schools Junior Cup, a rugby union competition
- Connacht Railway Cup, former Gaelic football competition

== See also ==
- Connacht Cup (disambiguation)
- Connacht Senior Cup (disambiguation)
