= Connacht Schools Rugby Senior Cup =

Schools rugby union competition in Ireland

Connacht Schools Senior Cup
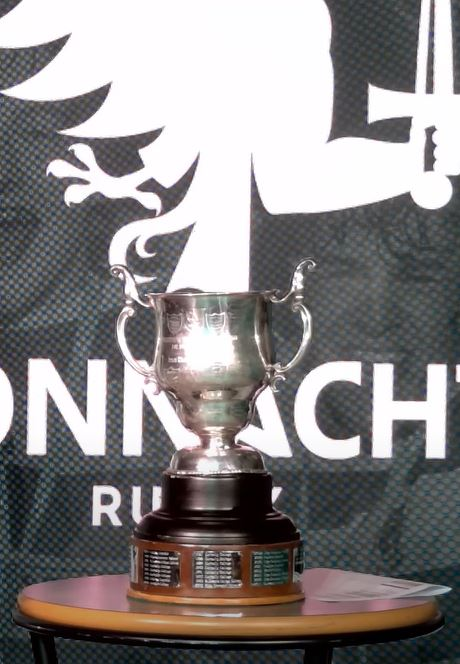
- Connacht Rugby Schools Senior Cup
- Sport: Rugby Union
- Founded: 1913
- No. of teams: 9 (season 2024-25)
- Most recent champion: Marist College, Athlone (2026)
- Most titles: Garbally College; 48

The Connacht School's Rugby Senior Cup is an annual rugby union competition for secondary schools affiliated to the Connacht Rugby Branch of the IRFU.

== History ==
The Connacht School's Rugby Senior Cup is an annual rugby union schools competition organised by the Connacht Rugby Branch of the IRFU. Boys, usually of seventeen or eighteen years of age, compete for the cup with rival schools from within the province of Connacht. The competition was first held in 1913, with Garbally College, Ballinasloe the first Champions.

The first round matches are typically played towards the end of January, with the final being played in the Galway Sportsgrounds the week before Saint Patrick's Day.

Historically, Garbally College have been the most successful school in the competition lifting the cup 48 times, while Coláiste Iognáid have been the most successful team since the turn of the millennium winning eight titles in years 2002, 2005, 2006, 2008, 2009, 2011, 2016 and 2017.

The current holders (2026) are Marist College, Athlone who defended the title by beating the previous three times consecutive champions Sligo Grammar School by 24-19 on 18 March 2026 at Dexcom Stadium, Galway.

== Competition structure ==
The Connacht Rugby Schools Cup is a three tier competition;

=== Senior Cup [Senior A Cup] ===
The premier competition played by the strongest rugby playing schools in the region. Current competition format is two pools [A & B] of three teams playing each other round robin. The Winners & Runner Up in each pool proceeding to the Semi-Finals.

- Winner Pool A vs Runner Up Pool B
- Winner Pool B vs Runner Up Pool A

The two other tiers cater for schools who cannot consistently compete at Senior Cup level by reason of playing population or experience.

In total 30 Schools representing all five provincial counties participated in the various Connacht Rugby Senior Schools Cups in 2019.

=== Connacht Senior Development Cup [Senior B Cup] ===
Is the Second Tier Competition for schools with established Rugby programs but who due to lower playing numbers or do not have the high level of population experience to consistently compete at Senior Cup Level.
Nine schools compete in three pools of three, leading to semifinals and a final.

=== Connacht Senior Emerging Cup [Senior C Cup] ===
Is the Third Tier Competition for Schools who have recently introduced Rugby programs within their schools.
Nine schools compete in three pools of three, leading to semifinals and a final.

The target is for schools to establish themselves within the lowest tier initially, and progress through to the highest tier.

== Roll of honour ==
School	Location	Outright Titles	Shared Titles	Runners-up +1	Total Finals +2	Last Title
Garbally College (3)	Ballinasloe, County Galway	47	0	7	54	2020
Coláiste Iognáid, Galway	Galway, County Galway	14	0	4	18	2017
Sligo Grammar School	Sligo, County Sligo	13	0	17	30	2024
St. Josephs College (The Bish)	Galway, County Galway	13	1	4	18	1994
Marist College	Athlone, County Westmeath	5	0	3	8	2026
The Ranelagh School, Athlone (2)	Athlone, County Westmeath	2	0	0	2	1923
Galway Grammar School (2)	Galway, County Galway	1	0	0	1	1941
Collegians (2)	Galway, County Galway	1	1	0	2	1951
St Sarans College (1)	Ferbane, County Offaly	1	0	2	3	2004
Wilsons Hospital	Multyfarnham, County Westmeath	1	0	1	2	1966
Clifden Community School	Clifden, County Galway	1	0	0	1	1975
Summerhill College	Sligo, County Sligo	0	0	2	2	N/A
CBS Roscommon	Roscommon, County Roscommon	0	0	1	1	N/A
Portumna Community School	Portumna, County Galway	0	0	1	1	N/A

- (1) Now Gallen Community School.
- (2) School now defunct.
- (3) Now Clonfert College.

== Cup final results [Senior A Cup] ==
=== 1910s ===
- 1913 Garbally College
- 1914 Garbally College
- 1915 Garbally College
- 1916 Garbally College
- 1917 not played
- 1918 St Joseph's (The Bish), Galway
- 1919 The Ranelagh School, Athlone

=== 1920s ===
- 1920 not played
- 1921 not played
- 1922 St Joseph's (The Bish), Galway
- 1923 The Ranelagh School, Athlone
- 1924 Coláiste Iognáid, Galway
- 1925 Coláiste Iognáid, Galway
- 1926 Garbally College
- 1927 Coláiste Iognáid, Galway
- 1928 Coláiste Iognáid, Galway
- 1929 Garbally College

=== 1930s ===
- 1930 St Joseph's (The Bish) Galway
- 1931 Garbally College
- 1932 Collegians / St Joseph's (The Bish), Galway (Shared Title)
- 1933 not played
- 1934 not played
- 1935 not played
- 1936 Garbally College
- 1937 Garbally College
- 1938 Garbally College
- 1939 Garbally College

=== 1940s ===
- 1940 Garbally College
- 1941 Galway Grammar School
- 1942 Garbally College
- 1943 not played
- 1944 not played
- 1945 not played
- 1946 not played
- 1947 not played
- 1948 not played
- 1949 Garbally College

=== 1950s ===
- 1950 Garbally College
- 1951 Collegians
- 1952 Garbally College
- 1953 Garbally College
- 1954 St Joseph's (The Bish), Galway
- 1955 Garbally College
- 1956 Garbally College
- 1957 Garbally College
- 1958 Garbally College
- 1959 St Joseph's (The Bish), Galway

=== 1960s ===
- 1960 St Joseph's (The Bish), Galway
- 1961 Sligo Grammar School
- 1962 Sligo Grammar School
- 1963 Sligo Grammar School
- 1964 St Joseph's (The Bish), Galway
- 1965 St Joseph's (The Bish), Galway
- 1966 Wilson's Hospital School, Multyfarnham, Co. Westmeath
- 1967 - Not played due to UK & IRL Foot & Mouth epidemic.
- 1968 - Not played due to UK & IRL Foot & Mouth epidemic.
- 1969 Sligo Grammar School

=== 1970s ===
- 1970 St Joseph's (The Bish), Galway beat Garbally College by 6–0
- 1971 Garbally College
- 1972 Garbally College
- 1973 Garbally College
- 1974 Garbally College
- 1975 Clifden Community School beat Garbally College by 10–6
- 1976 Garbally College
- 1977 Marist College, Athlone beat Sligo Grammar School
- 1978 Garbally College
- 1979 Coláiste Iognáid, Galway

=== 1980s ===
- 1980 Sligo Grammar School
- 1981 St Joseph's (The Bish), Galway
- 1982 Garbally College
- 1983 Garbally College
- 1984 Garbally College
- 1985 Coláiste Iognáid, Galway beat St Joseph's Patrician College, Galway
- 1986 Garbally College beat Coláiste Iognáid, Galway
- 1987 Garbally College
- 1988 Garbally College beat St Joseph's (The Bish), Galway) 9 – 6 Sportsground Galway; Garbally, Balfe 6, Carey 3)
- 1989 Garbally College beat St Joseph's (The Bish), Galway) 18 – 6 at Galwegians RFC, Galway

=== 1990s ===
- 1990 Garbally College beat Sligo Grammar School
- 1991 Garbally College
- 1992 Garbally College
- 1993 St Joseph's (The Bish), Galway
- 1994 St Joseph's (The Bish), Galway beat Sligo Grammar School
- 1995 Garbally College beat Sligo Grammar School
- 1996 Garbally College beat Sligo Grammar School
- 1997 Garbally College beat Sligo Grammar School
- 1998 Garbally College beat St. Saran's College, Ferbane
- 1999 Sligo Grammar School beat St Joseph's (The Bish), Galway by 24–5

=== 2000s ===
- 2000 Sligo Grammar School beat St. Saran's College, Ferbane by 24–10
- 2001 Garbally College beat Portumna Community School
- 2002 Coláiste Iognáid, Galway beat Garbally College
- 2003 Sligo Grammar School beat Garbally College
- 2004 St. Saran's College, Ferbane beat Sligo Grammar School by 20–0
- 2005 Coláiste Iognáid, Galway beat Sligo Grammar School by 16–3
- 2006 Coláiste Iognáid, Galway beat Sligo Grammar School by 13–10
- 2007 Garbally College beat Marist College, Athlone by 25–18
- 2008 Coláiste Iognáid, Galway beat Marist College, Athlone by 10–7
- 2009 Coláiste Iognáid, Galway beat Sligo Grammar School by 10–3

=== 2010s ===
- 2010 Sligo Grammar School beat Coláiste Iognáid, Galway by 26–11
- 2011 Coláiste Iognáid, Galway beat Sligo Grammar School by 23–13
- 2012 Marist College, Athlone beat Sligo Grammar School 12–0
- 2013 Marist College, Athlone beat Garbally College by 23 – 11
- 2014 Sligo Grammar School beat Garbally College 10–9 (after 10–10 draw)
- 2015 Garbally College beat Summerhill College, Sligo, by 19 – 18
- 2016 Coláiste Iognáid, Galway beat Garbally College by 16–15
- 2017 Coláiste Iognáid, Galway beat Summerhill College, Sligo by 13-7.
- 2018 Garbally College beat Coláiste Iognáid, Galway by 45-26
- 2019 Garbally College beat CBS Roscommon by 26-6

=== 2020s ===
- 2020 Garbally College beat Sligo Grammar School by 14-12
- 2021 - No competition due to the COVID-19 pandemic.
- 2022 Sligo Grammar School beat Coláiste Iognáid, Galway 15-10
- 2023 Sligo Grammar School beat Marist College, Athlone 28-07
- 2024 Sligo Grammar School beat Marist College, Athlone 29-18
- 2025 Marist College, Athlone beat Sligo Grammar School 33-29
- 2026 Marist College, Athlone beat Sligo Grammar School 24-19

== Other cup competitions ==
=== Connacht Senior Development Cup Results [Senior B Cup] ===
==== 2000s ====
- 2009 St Josephs College, Galway beat Summerhill College, Sligo

==== 2010s ====
- 2010 Rice College, Westport beat Clarin College, Athenry.
- 2011 St Josephs College, Galway beat Clifden CS by 14–12.
- 2012 Coláiste Éinde, Galway beat Clifden CS by 10–07.
- 2013 HRC Mountbellew beat Scoil Chuimsitheach Chiaráin, An Cheathru Rua
- 2014 St Josephs College, Galway beat Clifden CS by 7–0.
- 2015 Scoil Chuimsitheach Chiaráin, Carraroe beat Gortnor Abbey, Crossmolina by 41-19.
- 2016 St Muredach's College, Ballina beat Presentation College Headford by 18-12.
- 2017 Presentation College Headford beat Gortnor Abbey, Crossmolina by 43-32.
- 2018 Scoil Chuimsitheach Chiaráin, Carraroe beat Gallen CS by 25–19.
- 2019 St Muredach's College, Ballina beat St Josephs College, Galway by 15-5 .

==== 2020s ====
- 2020 No Competition due to Covid19 Pandemic
- 2021 Coláiste Éinde, Galway beat St Pauls Oughterard by 23-20.
- 2022 St Joseph's College, Galway beat Athlone Community College by 24-7
- 2023 Presentation College, Athenry beat Coláiste Bhaile Chláir, Claregalway by 36-27
- 2024 Coláiste Bhaile Chláir, Claregalway beat Presentation College, Athenry by 20-15
- 2025 St. Raphael's College, Loughrea beat Rice College, Westport by 26 - 27

=== Connacht Senior Emerging Cup Results [Senior C Cup] ===
==== 2010s ====
- 2016 Jesus & Mary Secondary School, Enniscrone beat St Joseph’s, Foxford by 13-10
- 2017 Presentation College, Athenry beat Jesus & Mary Secondary School, Enniscrone by 31-22
- 2018 St. Jarlath's College, Tuam beat St. Raphael's College, Loughrea by 10-5
- 2019 St Joseph’s, Foxford vs Gallen CS - match not played - Trophy Shared

==== 2020s ====
- 2020 No Competition due to Covid19 Pandemic
- 2021 Presentation College Headford beat Sancta Maria College, Louisburgh by 19-0.
- 2022 Coláiste Bhaile Chláir, Claregalway beat Sancta Maria College, Louisburgh by 38-7
- 2023 St Gerald's College, Castlebar beat Rice College, Westport by 53-27
- 2024 St Jarlath's College, Tuam beat St Louis CS, Kiltimagh 35-24
- 2025 Carrick on Shannon CS beat St Pauls Oughterard by 24-22

=== Galway City Senior Cup ===
- 2006 Coláiste Iognáid
- 2007 Coláiste Iognáid
- 2008 Coláiste Iognáid beat Calasanctius College, Oranmore
- 2009 Coláiste Iognáid
- 2010 Coláiste Iognáid
- 2011 Coláiste Iognáid

== Other competitions ==
=== Senior League ===
==== 2000's ====
- 2003–04 Sligo Grammar School beat Garbally College
- 2004–05
- 2005–06
- 2006–07 Garbally College beat Coláiste Iognáid by 22–0
- 2007–08 Coláiste Iognáid beat Marist College Athlone by 17–8
- 2008–09 Coláiste Iognáid beat Sligo Grammar School by 8–6
- 2009–10 Sligo Grammar School beat Coláiste Iognáid by 22–0

==== 2010's ====
- 2010–11 Coláiste Iognáid beat Calasanctius, Oranmore 26–11
- 2011–12 Marist College Athlone beat Sligo Grammar School
- 2012–13 Marist College Athlone beat Sligo Grammar School by 13–0
- 2013–14 Garbally College beat Sligo Grammar School 11–6

From 2014-15 onward the league competition winner is determined as the team finishing top after all rounds are completed.

- 2014–15 Garbally College Runner-up: Sligo Grammar School
- 2015–16 Sligo Grammar School Runner-up: Garbally College
- 2016–17 Sligo Grammar School Runner-up: Coláiste Iognáid

For year 2017-18, the winner is determined after a playoff final between the winners of Two Group sections.

- 2017–18 Garbally College beat Coláiste Iognáid by 34–7
- 2018-19 Garbally College beat Marist College, Athlone by 32-15
- 2019-20 Sligo Grammar School beat Garbally College by 21-12

==== 2020's ====
- 2020-21 No Competition due to COVID-19 Restrictions.
- 2021-22 Sligo Grammar School beat Garbally College by 25-13
- 2022-23 Sligo Grammar School beat Summerhill College by 10-3
- 2023-24 Sligo Grammar School beat Marist College, Athlone 29-18 (replay)
- 2024-25 Marist College, Athlone beat Sligo Grammar School by 17-14.
- 2025-26 Sligo Grammar School beat Marist College, Athlone 22-15

== Senior and Junior Cup Doubles ==
- Garbally College (25), last 2019.
- St Joseph's, Galway (The Bish) (4)
- Sligo Grammar School (2)
- Ranelagh College (1)
- Marist College, Athlone (1)
- St Jarlath's College, Tuam (1)

== Senior Cup and League Doubles ==
- 2008 Coláiste Iognáid
- 2009 Coláiste Iognáid
- 2010 Sligo Grammar School
- 2011 Coláiste Iognáid
- 2012 Marist College, Athlone
- 2013 Marist College, Athlone
- 2015 Garbally College
- 2018 Garbally College
- 2019 Garbally College
- 2022 Sligo Grammar School
- 2023 Sligo Grammar School
- 2024 Sligo Grammar School
- 2025 Marist College, Athlone

== See also ==
- Connacht Rugby
- Connacht Schools Junior Cup
- Leinster Schools Senior Cup
- Munster Schools Senior Cup
- Ulster Schools Senior Cup
- Ireland national schoolboy rugby union team
