= Coláiste Iognáid =

School in Galway, Ireland

Coláiste Iognáid SJ
- The Jes

Location
- Sea Road; Galway, H91 N732; Ireland; 53°16′11″N 9°03′43″W

Information
- Type: Voluntary
- Motto: Latin: Ad Majorem Dei Gloriam (To the greater glory of God)
- Religious affiliations: Roman Catholic; Society of Jesus
- Established: 1645; 381 years ago
- Principal: David O'Sullivan
- Gender: Co-educational
- Age: 12 to 18
- Enrollment: approx. 600 (2026)
- Colours: Maroon; Yellow
- Website: colaisteiognaid.ie

Coláiste Iognáid SJ (English: Ignatius College), a co-educational secondary school, is located on Sea Road in Galway, Ireland. Founded in 1645, with numerous locations over the years before its current home, it is one of a number of Jesuit schools in Ireland. As of 2026, the school had approximately 600 pupils enrolled.

== History ==
Since 1620, the Jesuits have, with some involuntary intermissions, been working with and for the people of Galway. In 1645 their first school was founded through the generosity of Edmund Kirwan. While the language of the classroom was Latin, only the Jesuits with a fluent command of Irish were sent on the "Irish Mission".

The school, which was incorporated into a Jesuit residence in the present Abbeygate Street, continued in Galway through a time of political upheaval and military activity.

In 1859, at the request of the Bishop of Galway, John McEvilly, the Jesuits once more took up residence in the city, this time in Prospect Hill and served in the nearby St. Patrick's Church. Within a year they had opened a college near the site of the present Bank of Ireland at 19 Eyre Square. The college's present location on Sea Road dates from 1863, when it was built the same year as the Jesuit church next door, St Ignatius Church.

The modern phase of Coláiste Iognáid began in 1929. The local enthusiasm for the language revival efforts of the emerging Republic of Ireland was to be served by a re-invigorated Coláiste Iognáid, which became an Irish-medium School in 1931.

In 1967, in contrast with its foundation of 1620, Coláiste Iognáid became part of the "non-fee-paying" secondary school system. In 1969, with the co-operation of management and staff, coupled with the help of parents, past pupils, and friends of the Jesuits, the present main school building, the Griffin Building, was built.

In 1974, when the school population was increased to provide three-form entry, one co-educational form became the Irish-medium Scoil Gaeilge. Following consultation with staff and Jesuits, the school established the Board of Management in 1980 to take shared responsibility for all aspects of the school – the first agreed board of its kind in Ireland.

In 1982, the school initiated a building programme. This produced a new science block (O’Reilly Building), a refurbished classroom block (Andrews Building), a library, and art, computer, and co-educational facilities. The Colombian Hall was refurbished and an indoor sports area was added. Co-education was extended to the whole school in 1984, to become the first fully co-educational secondary school in the city.

== Governance ==
Coláíste Íognáíd is a non-fee-paying, co-educational, secondary school, comprising Jesuit and lay staff and catering to a broad spectrum of social and academic intake. The school has a three-form entry. One form offers education through Irish up to Junior Certificate and all three forms offer mixed-ability teaching.

The school is run by a board of management comprising parent, teacher, and Jesuit representatives. It is non-fee-paying, co-educational, and has no school uniforms. Students study there from ages thirteen to eighteen and sit the Junior and Leaving Certificate examinations. Each of the six-year groups is divided into four classes. The four groups are Gaeilge ("Irish Stream"), Xavier, Loyola, and Collins (G, X, L, C). Students are taught in similar ability classes throughout the school. The school is known locally as the 'Jes'.

In the fourth year ("Transition Year"), all students are reassigned into one of four classes, Brebeuf, Gonzaga, Ricci, or Claver (B, G, R, C). The classes return to the initial four groups in the fifth year for Irish classes only. The reorganisation of the groups for the fourth year is part of the school's "Transition Year" programme. While the Transition Year is optional in some Irish schools, it is compulsory in Coláiste Iognáid.

== Curriculum ==
In the three-year Junior Cycle, all pupils follow the Junior Certificate syllabus in the core subjects of Irish, English, Mathematics, Business studies, Science, Geography, Religious studies, History, Physical education, SPHE, and CSPE, as well as a choice between German and French along with a further option of either Music, Home economics, Art or Graphics.

Transition year follows the Junior Certificate and comprises a selection of courses designed within the school and taught as modules. The subjects taken are as follows: accounting, art - design & craft, career guidance, computers, English (in 4 modules - media studies, modern fiction, drama, creative writing), French, Irish, Spanish, Germany, geography, history, home economics, safety, home maintenance, mathematics, hygiene, music, physical education, religious studies, science and social studies.

In the two-year Senior cycle pupils prepare for the Leaving Certificate. In addition to religious education, pupils study Irish, English, maths, French, and a choice of three from chemistry, accountancy, German, art, physics, geography, economics, music, biology, history, business, home economics (social and scientific), and design and communication graphics.

== Sport and extracurricular activities ==
=== Gaelic games ===
Gaelic football is popular in the school. In 2017, both the Junior Gaelic football team and the Juvenile team qualified for their respective Connacht finals. The Junior team played Glenamaddy and the Juvenile team (U-15) played Garbally College.

=== Basketball ===
The Jes has teams participating in regional girls' competitions at the senior and under-16 level and in boys' competitions in the under-16, second, and first-year age groups.

=== Football ===
In 2008-09 there were association football (soccer) squads from three different age groups representing the school – first year, under-14s, and under 16s.

The under-14 and under-16 teams qualified for the knockout round of the Connacht schools cup – both coming through their groups through disqualification.

The senior squad reached the semi-final of the Connacht schools competition in 2014, losing to Summerhill College of Sligo.

=== Hockey ===
From 2001 to 2006 the Senior Girls Hockey Team won Senior A leagues and represented Connacht at the National Finals.

In the 2005-2006 year a Senior B team was submitted for the first time since 1989. The team submitted in 1989 was the school's first hockey team and they won the competition. The following year they moved down to the C Division. They went on to win the league, defeating Salerno B 2–1 in the final.

In 2008 and 2009 the Senior team won the Connacht Schools Senior Cup with victories over Taylor's Hill and Our Lady's Bower Secondary School, Athlone, respectively in the finals. They then participated in the 2008-2009 ESB Kate Russell All-Ireland Girls Schools Finals where they beat Foyle and Londonderry College 3–2 in the final.

In 2010, Coláiste Iognáid hosted the Kate Russell All-Ireland Championships at Dangan Sports Ground.

=== Rowing ===
Coláiste Iognáid Rowing Club (CIRC) has won a number of regional and national rowing trophies and several club members have represented Ireland in international competitions.

In the 2005–2006 season, the women's junior crew won the women's junior eights and fours championships of Ireland and became the Connacht Tribune "Team of the Year". Four oarswomen from the club represented Ireland at the Home Internationals. Later in the year, the school bought new boats and oars.

The school had students representing Ireland in the Home International and Coupe de la Jeunesse competitions in 2007 and 2008. The Jes also sent crews to Ghent, Belgium, for the annual KRSG international regatta. There, the men's crew finished first in the junior-18 fours. At the 2008 Coup de la Jeunesse in Cork, Eddie Mullarkey was in the two-bow seat of the men's coxed four that took silver, and Katie Barrett and Aifric Keogh competed in the women’s 8+ event, winning bronze medals.

In 2008, the women won the all-Ireland junior women's eights title. In the 2008 Olympics in Beijing, Cormac Folan, a former student, competed in Rowing at the 2008 Summer Olympics, in the bowseat of the Heavyweight Four, finishing 10th overall. Another ex-Jes rower, Paul Murray, won gold at the Universiade in Lithuania.

At the 2009 European Junior Rowing Championships at Vichy, France, Zoe Mannion and Aifric Keogh, representing Ireland, finished second to Britain to win a silver medal in the women's junior pairs. Three weeks previously, rowing as Coláiste Iognáid, the pair won the junior title at the Irish National Rowing Championships held in Cork.

In 2016, the women won the junior 15 and 16 8s at the Irish Championships.

At the 2020 Tokyo Olympic Games, Aifric Keogh was part of the bronze medal-winning women's coxless four team.

=== Rugby ===
The school's senior rugby team (Jes S Senior XV) have won the Connacht Schools Senior Cup a record eight times in the early 21st century (2002, 2005, 2006, 2008, 2009, 2011, 2016 and 2017). In all since the school's first cup win 1924, the school has a record of having won the Senior Cup on 14 occasions (second in the all time winners list) from 1913 to 2017, with several further final appearances.

In the 2007–2008 season, the school progressed to the Connacht Schools Senior Cup final where they met Marist College, Athlone and won 10–7. In 2008–2009, the Jes beat Sligo Grammar School 10–3 to record their 11th victory in this competition and move up to third in the all-time-winners list. In 2011, the Jes beat Sligo Grammar again in the semi-finals 30–5. The Jes returned to the final for season 2015/16, resulting in the Cup returning to Sea Road after a 16–15 win over Garbally College. The Cup was retained in the 2016–17 season when Summerhill College, Sligo were beaten 13–7.

The school's junior rugby team (Jes J) reached the final of the Connacht Schools Junior Cup in 2006 and lost to Garbally 12–20. In 2015, they lost to CBS Roscommon and most recently in 2017 they lost to Garbally College by 17–13. The junior side have been Connacht Champions on four occasions (1918, 1978, 1981, 1987) and have been finalists in 1999 and 1989 though records are incomplete.

=== Other sports ===
Other sports undertaken at the school include canoeing, athletics, ultimate frisbee, swimming and mountaineering.

=== Other activities ===
Pupils may also participate in various clubs and cultural activities such as debating (Irish and English), drama, social action, and orchestra. With many of the nearby schools, extra-curricular activities pupils enter city, provincial, and national competitions like Feile Scoil Dramaiochta, Feis Cheoil na hÉireann, Concern and Denny debates, the Young Scientist Competition, golf, and the various blitz, cup, and league fixtures and regattas. The school also produces a public musical/drama each year which the fifth years perform.

==== Debating ====
The school has contested debating competitions both nationally and internationally. As of 2015, it has had the highest tabbing for eight consecutive years. The current society, founded in 2007, convenes every week and is open to all students.

From 2006 to 2016, the society won the Denny Schools' Debating Connacht Title (now known as the "West of Ireland Debating Championship") eleven times. The school won the "double" at this level in 2010, winning the individual championship and the team award. In 2012 the society took part in a record 17 separate competitions around Ireland. In 2014 and 2015, the school won the "double".

The school was represented in the National Junior Mace finals every year of its existence and also qualified for ICYD nine times (2010,2011, 2012, 2013, 2014, 2015, 2016, 2017). In both 2015 and 2017, the school qualified for Cambridge Senior International.

From 2008 to 2009 and in 2014, 2015,2016, the society won both the NUIG Junior and Senior Maces as well as being runners up in the All-Ireland Denny Schools Debating Competition. Students featured as representatives to the Irish National Session of the European Youth Parliament and were selected to the National Schools’ Debate Team. Two other students won the UCD Law Society Mace. Andrew Forde, won the Galway Public Speaking award and he and Eoghan Finn represented Ireland at the European Youth Parliament. From 2011 to 2012, the pair won the West of Ireland Schools Senior Debate Final, the Belvedere Junior Mace, the St. Conleth's Junior Mace, the Coláiste na hInse Junior Mace, the Trinity Senior Pro-Am Final, and the NUIG "Alan Kerins" Mace. From 2012 to 2013, the society were champions at the West of Ireland Senior Final, the Coláiste na hInse Junior Mace, and the National Junior Mace 2013. In September 2015 the school won the 2015 Belvedere Junior Mace chaired by Joe Duffy. They won the same competition again in 2016.

The school won the West of Ireland Debating Competition in 2014. The following year, in 2015, the school won it again, meaning that since its first involvement in 2004 the school has won it most of any school.

Since 2013 the school has run its own Junior Mace as part of the National Junior Mace event. It won it in 2013, 2014, 2016, 2017. In 2016, the school mace qualified 2 teams for ICYD Cambridge 2017, these speakers were among the top 88 young speakers in the world.

== Notable alumni ==
=== Sports ===
- Aaron Conneely - Former rugby player for Connacht
- Eric Elwood - Former rugby player for Connacht and Ireland
- Cathal Forde - Rugby player for Connacht
- Hugh Gavin - Rugby player for Connacht
- Eoin Griffin - Former Rugby player for Connacht and London Irish
- Eoin McKeon - Former Rugby player for Connacht
- Claire Molloy - Rugby player for Bristol Bears Women and Ireland
- Daniel Riordan - Former rugby player for Connacht and Leinster
- Robert Finnerty, Gaelic footballer
- Aifric Keogh, rower and Olympic Medallist

=== Arts and media ===
- Seán Duignan, journalist, newsreader, political aide and writer
- William Joyce, Nazi propaganda broadcaster
- Proinsias Mac Aonghusa, journalist
- Harry McGee, political correspondent with The Irish Times
- Sean O'Rourke, RTÉ radio presenter
- Seán Mac Réamoinn, broadcaster and journalist.
- Micheál Breathnach, writer
- Paul Fahy, artistic director of the Galway Arts Festival
- Seán Duignan, journallist with RTÉ

=== Politics and law ===
- Martin McDonogh, Irish politician
- Bobby Molloy, former Fianna Fáil and later Progressive Democrats TD for Galway West and government minister
- Frank Hugh O'Donnell, writer, journalist and nationalist politician
- Paul O'Higgins, legal scholar

=== Other ===
- Markus Casey, Irish archaeologist
- Fr Peter Yorke - Irish American Priest, pastor of St. Peter's Church in Archdiocese of San Francisco and Labor activist

== Notable staff ==
- Johnny Geraghty, former Galway footballer
- Carl Hession, musician and composer
- Pádraig Ó Céidigh, businessman and former Senator
- Ray Silke, former Gaelic footballer

== Scoil Iognáid ==
Scoil Náisiúnta Iognaid

Location
- Raleigh Row; Galway, H91 E364; 53°16′14″N 9°03′45″W

Information
- Type: National school, primary
- Religious affiliation: Roman Catholic
- Patron saint: St Ignatius of Loyola
- Established: 1971; 55 years ago
- Gender: Coeducational
- Enrollment: 550

Associated with Coláiste Iognáid is Scoil Iognáid (English: St Ignatius School). It is a national school and is the main primary school of the college, located on Bothar Na Sliogan, 200m from the college.

It was founded by the Jesuits in 1971 and, like the college, was administered by them. It is also bi-lingual and coeducational. As of 2012 it had 550 pupils.

== See also ==
- List of schools in the Republic of Ireland
- List of Jesuit sites in Ireland
- List of Jesuit schools
