= Mághnus Breathnach =

Irish Gaelic footballer

Personal information
- Native name: Mághnus Breathnach (Irish)
- Born: 29 September 1991 (age 35) Galway, Ireland
- Height: 1.88 m (6 ft 2 in)

Sport
- Sport: Gaelic Football
- Position: Goalkeeper
Club
- Years: Club
- 2008–: An Spidéal
Inter-county
- Years: County
- 2012–2019: Galway
Inter-county titles
- Connacht titles: 1

Mághnus Breathnach is an Irish Gaelic footballer who plays as a goalkeeper for the Galway senior football team since making his debut in 2012 to succeed Adrian Faherty who emigrated to London. He also plays club for An Spidéal.
