= Connacht Senior Cup =

Connacht Senior Cup may refer to:

- Connacht Senior Cup (rugby union)
- Connacht Schools Rugby Senior Cup, a rugby union competition.
- Connacht Senior Cup (association football)
- Connacht Senior League Challenge Cup, an association football competition.

== See also ==
- Connacht Cup (disambiguation)
- Connaught Cup (disambiguation)
