= Sancta Maria College =

Sancta Maria College may refer to:

== Colleges ==
- Trocaire College, a private college in Buffalo, New York; name changed from Sancta Maria College in 1967

== Secondary schools ==
- Sancta Maria College, Louisburgh, a secondary school in Louisburgh, County Mayo, Ireland
- Sancta Maria College, New Zealand, a secondary school in Auckland, New Zealand
- Sancta Maria College, Rathfarnham, a secondary school in Ballyroan, Rathfarnham, Co. Dublin, Ireland
