= Ralph Kenna =

Irish mathematician and theoretical physicist

Professor Ralph Kenna
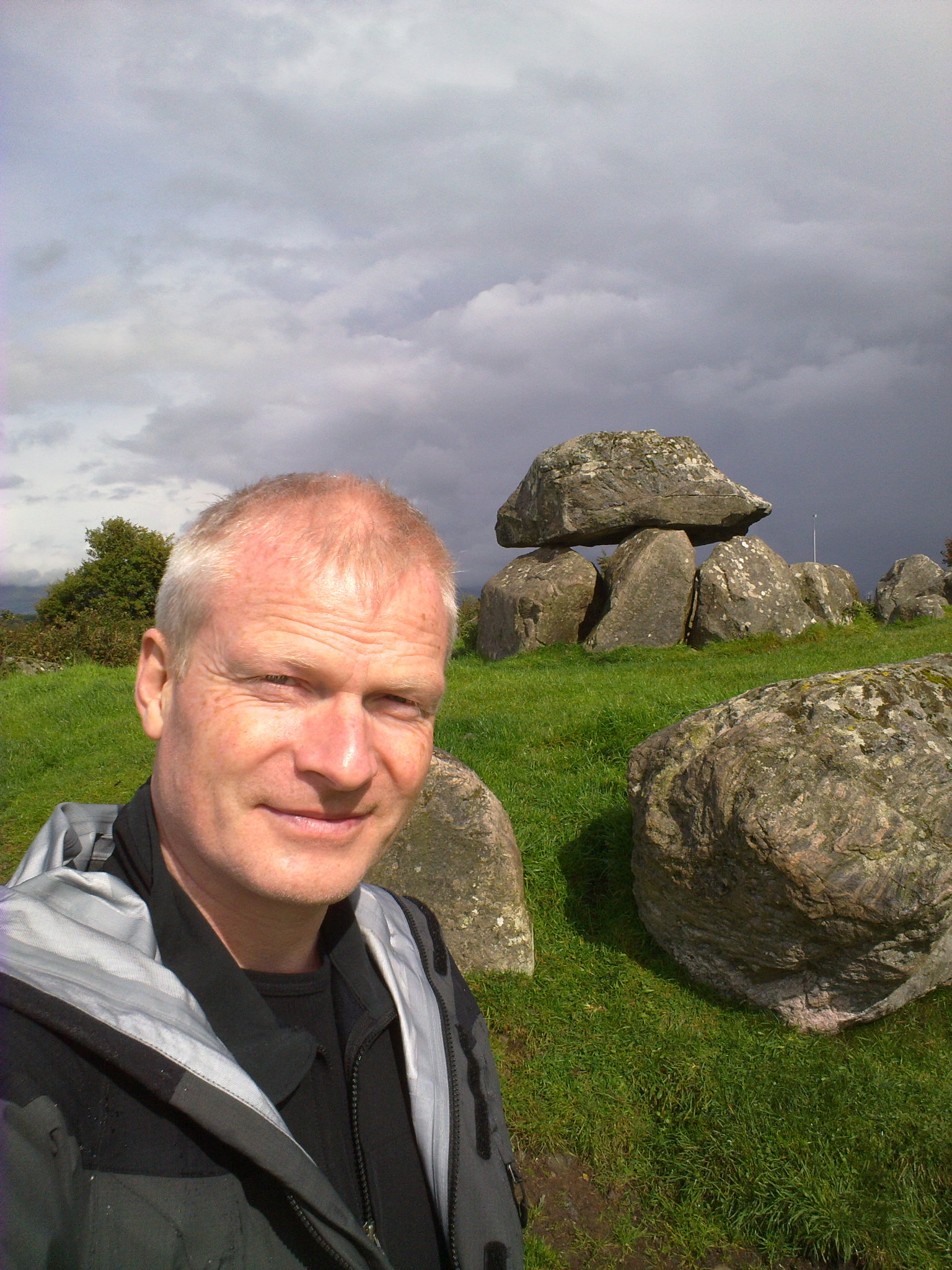
- Born: Ralph Jude Kenna; 27 August 1964; Athlone, Ireland
- Died: 26 October 2023 (aged 59)
- Citizenship: Ireland
- Education: University of Graz; Trinity College Dublin
- Scientific career
- Fields: Statistical physics; Complex systems; Comparative mythology
- Workplaces: Coventry University; Trinity College Dublin; University of Liverpool; University of Graz

Professor Ralph Kenna (27 August 1964 – 26 October 2023) was an Irish mathematician and theoretical physicist who was head of the statistical physics research group at Coventry University. He was a specialist in statistical physics, complex systems and Irish mythology.

== Early life and education ==
Kenna was born in Athlone, on the border between counties Roscommon and Westmeath, Ireland, on 27 August 1964. He attended Marist College, Athlone (best leaving certificate, class of 1981) and obtained his B.A. (mod) degree in Theoretical Physics from Trinity College Dublin in 1985. He also obtained his M.Sc. (1988) from Trinity College Dublin. He completed his PhD (Dr. rer. nat.) at the University of Graz under Professor Christian Lang in 1993.

== Career ==
Kenna was an EU Marie Curie Research Fellow at the University of Liverpool from 1994 to 1997 and at Trinity College Dublin from 1997 to 1999. He lectured at Trinity from 1998 to 2002, when he moved to Coventry University. In 2005, he co-founded the Applied Mathematics Research Centre at Coventry and founded the Statistical Physics Group there. In 2018 these joined the Fluid and Complex Systems Research Centre, Coventry University, of which Kenna was deputy director.

== Research ==
Kenna's research interests relate to field theory, statistical physics (especially phase transitions and critical phenomena) and complex systems (especially applied to Irish mythology and other epic narratives).

=== Statistical physics ===
In statistical physics, Kenna is noted for his development of scaling relations for logarithmic corrections. Already in his PhD Thesis he introduced a renormalization group basis for finite-size scaling (FSS) for logarithmic corrections at the upper critical dimension and, with Bertrand Berche, he extended this to higher dimensions in 2012. They proposed that universality lives at the pseudocritical point instead of at the critical point and a new form for hyperscaling, valid in high dimensions. This led to the introduction of the new critical exponent ϙ (koppa) and its logarithmic counterpart ϙ̂ (ϙ-hat or koppa-hat) to govern the finite-size dependence of the correlation length and a new form for FSS, called QFSS, to replace standard prescription above the upper critical dimension. Fourier analysis showed two regimes that control finite systems in high dimensions instead of Landau scaling. The Q sector is affected by dangerous irrelevant variables and the Gaussian, or G, sector (G) is not but both are physical. The pseudocritical point resides in the Q sector while the critical point itself may be either Q or G.

Formal similarities between spin systems on lattices and on scale-free networks mean an analogy between dimensionality and power-law decay of the node degree distribution there. Logarithmic corrections at critical values also obey the scaling relations developed by Kenna in 2006. Kenna's work on percolation theory in high dimensions and spin models on annealed scale-free networks has featured in the Institute of Physics News.

=== Complex systems ===
In 2010, with Bertrand Berche, Kenna quantified the notion of critical mass of academic research groups. Using data from the UK's Research Assessment Exercise 2008 and the French counterpart (AERES) they tracked how research group quality depends on the size of the group. They found quality rises linearly with group size up to a point which they later identified as akin to the Dunbar number in anthropology. Critical mass, defined as the minimum size a group needs to achieve to be sustainable, is half that size. Subsequently, with Olesya Mryglod and Yurij Holovatch, Kenna and Berche used scientometrics to predict the outcome of the UK's Research Excellence Framework 2014. They found that correlations between metrics and peer review are poor and the former cannot reliably be used to replace the latter. This went some way to halting the overuse of metrics at the Research Excellence Framework 2021.

=== Comparative mythology ===
In comparative mythology Kenna is noted for pioneering the usage of complex networks in the study of Irish and other mythologies. His first paper on the topic was downloaded over 30,000 times in 10 years, a record for Europe's flagship letters journal in physics, and resulted in considerable media coverage in international press. Other major works include investigations into the Sagas of Icelanders. Kenna's team found that whether the sagas are historically accurate or not, the properties of the social worlds they record are similar to those of real social networks. The epic poems of Ossian were the focus of the next subject of study with conclusions broadly in line with the view they were misappropriated from Irish sources. The Viking Age in Ireland as portrayed in Cogadh Gaedhel re Gallaibh was next tackled by Kenna's team. They developed a measure to place hostility on a spectrum between civil war and international conflict. Their findings quantified and supported the traditional view of the Viking age in Ireland as one of international conflict and challenged recent revisionist claims. A study of the character Fraoch identified quantifiable differences between the two parts of his story, supporting the suggestion it was set to writing by two different scribes, one of whom embellished the tale. Kenna and co-workers also studied Ukrainian mythology. They compared the Kyiv bylyny cycle to other prominent European epics to identify universal and distinguishing properties of its social networks. Kenna's team developed mathematical and statistical methods to probe how a modern complex narrative - namely George R. R. Martin's epic novels, A Song of Ice and Fire - achieved broad acclaim without surrendering to the need for reductionist simplifications. This and other works on narratology led to sustained media interest.

== Awards, grants and honours ==
Kenna was awarded a Council of Europe scholarship to study in Austria where his PhD was then fully funded by a grant from the Austrian Science Fund (1990–1993). He twice held EU Marie Curie Research Fellowships (1994–1997 at the University of Liverpool and in 1997 at Trinity College Dublin). He also held an Enterprise Ireland Fellowship while in Trinity (1997–1999). In 2004 Kenna became Member of the Institute of Physics and in 2011 he was elected Fellow of the Institute of Mathematics and its Applications. He held a number of grants throughout the years, including from the Leverhulme Trust (2010–2013) and European Science Foundation (2014), to support his work on comparative mythology. Kenna held or supported a number of Marie Skłodowska-Curie Actions including an FP7 International Research Staff Exchange Scheme with Christian von Ferber (2012–2016; 2014–2018) and an FP7-Marie Curie International Incoming Fellowship for Dr Nikolay Izmailyan to visit him in Coventry (2013–2015). Kenna has been supported by Armenian State Committee of Science Thematic Grants to collaborate with Nerses Izmailyan (2021–2025). In 2019 Kenna was awarded Doctor honoris causa by the Academic Council of the Institute for Condensed Matter Physics of the National Academy of Sciences of Ukraine. His certificate of election reads:

By the decision of the Academic Council of the ICMP of the National Acad. Sci. of Ukraine of February 11, 2019 the title of Doctor honoris causa was conferred on Ralph Kenna (Coventry, England) for the studies which provided explanation of scaling and universality in complex systems of many interacting agents, pioneering interdisciplinary applications of statistical physics as well as for his personal initiative in different forms of collaboration with Ukraine and his engagement in preparation of young scientists.

In 2023 Kenna was selected as Member of the London Mathematical Society Research Policy Committee.

== Personal life ==
Kenna was first child of Pat Kenna and Irene Kenna (née Benson). Kenna had an out-of-hospital cardiac arrest in 2017. Despite being 30 minutes gone, he made a full recovery. He became fund raiser for the air ambulance who brought him back. He married Claire Dutton in 2015. Claire has an M.Sc. in medical statistics and in 2018 published two papers about out-of-hospital cardiac arrests. They had one child.

He died on 26 October 2023.

== Selected publications ==
- Kenna, Ralph (2012). "Universal Scaling Relations for Logarithmic-Correction Exponents". In Holovatch, Yurij (ed.). Order, Disorder, and Criticality: Advanced Problems of Phase Transition Theory. Vol. 3. Singapore: World Scientific. pp. 1–46. arXiv:1205.4252. doi:10.1142/9789814417891_0001. ISBN 978-981-4417-88-4. S2CID 116727112.
- Kenna; Berche (2013). "A new critical exponent ϙ and its logarithmic counterpart ̂ϙ" (PDF). Condensed Matter Physics. 16 (2) 23601. doi:10.5488/CMP.16.23601.
- Kenna, Ralph; MacCarron, Máirín; MacCarron, Pádraig (22 September 2016). Maths Meets Myths: Quantitative Approaches to Ancient Narratives. Switzerland: Springer. ISBN 978-3-319-39445-9.
- Gessey-Jones, Thomas; Connaughton, Colm; Dunbar, Robin; Kenna, Ralph; MacCarron, Pádraig; O'Conchobhair, Cathal; Yose, Joseph (17 November 2020). "Narrative structure of A Song of Ice and Fire creates a fictional world with realistic measures of social complexity". Proceedings of the National Academy of Sciences. 117 (46): 28582–28588. arXiv:2012.01783. Bibcode:2020PNAS..11728582G. doi:10.1073/pnas.2006465117. ISSN 0027-8424. PMC 7682562. PMID 33139549.
