= Anthony Kelly (academic) =

English academic

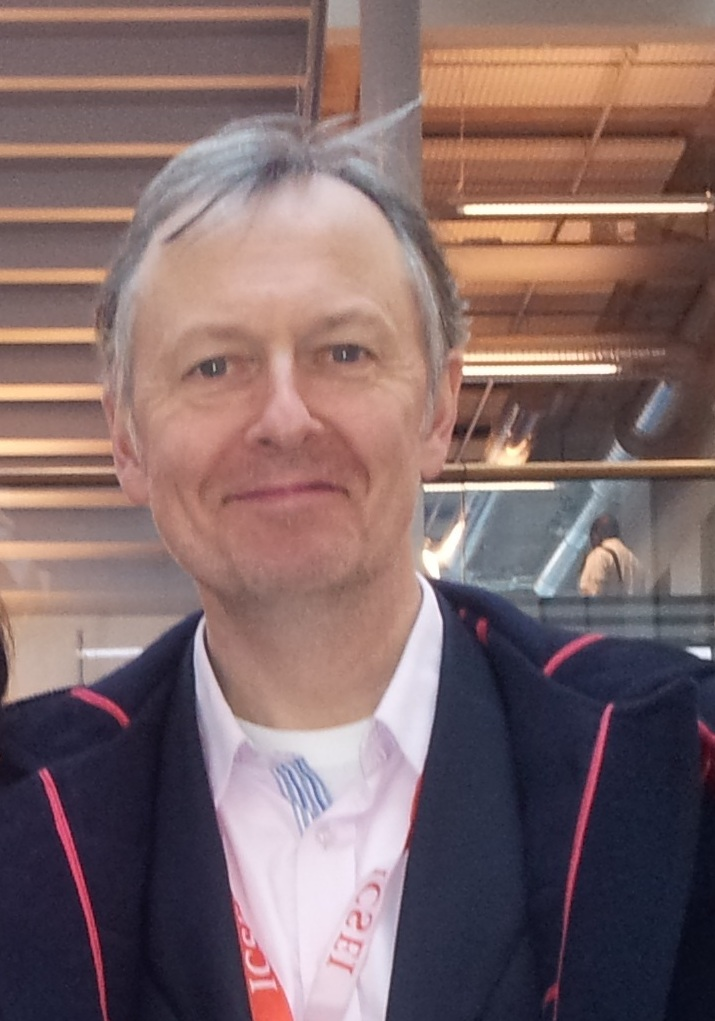
- Scientific career
- Institutions: University of Southampton

Anthony Elliott-Kelly FAcSS, or Anthony Kelly and commonly known as Tony Kelly, is an Irish academic who is currently Professor of Education at the University of Southampton, England.

== Education and career ==
Kelly attended secondary school at Marist College, Athlone, and attended the National University of Ireland, Queens' College, Cambridge and Trinity College, Cambridge.

He previously worked at the University of Cambridge with Mel West, and before that was a headteacher in Ireland. His background is in applied mathematics and theoretical physics. He is a fellow of the Institute of Physics and of the Institute of Mathematics and its Applications, organizations devoted to improving education and research. In 2013 he was elected as an Academician of the Academy of Social Sciences. He was a leading figure in the movement to integrate and rationalise education in the Irish border region where he developed new governance structures.

Kelly was well known in Ireland because of his work in merging schools with different traditions. As a student at Cambridge he famously cast doubt on the sincerity of a student discussion (on Irish politics) in a student society.

Kelly was founding editor of the journal Education, Knowledge and Economy, serves on the editorial board of other international academic journals, and is an invited lecturer and Visiting Professor at several leading universities. He serves on several national UK steering groups and approval panels, and has appeared before the House of Commons Select Committee on Education. He served on the REF2014 and REF2021 panels for Education. He also retains an interest and involvement in Anglo-Irish affairs. He is the author of approximately one hundred single-authored research reports, books and papers in leading academic journals. and was highly regarded by students for the quality of his lectures. He is a member of the Hawks Club [Cambridge], the Oxford & Cambridge Club [Pall Mall] and the Athenaeum [Pall Mall]. He has played Bridge at International level for Northern Ireland.

== Works ==
His books include:

- Benchmarking for School Improvement: A Practical Guide for Comparing & Improving Effectiveness. London, Routledge Falmer, 2001.
- Decision-making through Game Theory. Cambridge, Cambridge University Press, 2003.
- The Intellectual Capital of Schools: Measuring and managing knowledge, responsibility and reward: Lessons from the commercial sector. Dordrecht, New York & London, Kluwer Academic Press, 2004.
- School Choice and Student Well-being: opportunity and capability in education. London, Palgrave Macmillan, 2007.
- Using Effectiveness Data for School Improvement: developing and utilising metrics. London, Routledge, 2011. [with Downey, Christopher]
- Developing metrics for equity, diversity and competition: new measures for schools and universities. London, Routledge, 2016.
- Dynamic Management and Leadership in Education: high reliability techniques for schools, colleges and universities. London, Routledge, 2021.
