= 1925–26 National Football League (Ireland) =

Irish football competition

League details
- Dates: 1925 – 19 September 1926

League champions
- Winners: Laois (1st win)
- Captain: Dick Miller

League runners-up
- Runners-up: Dublin

The 1925–26 National Football League was the 1st staging of the National Football League, a Gaelic football tournament for the Gaelic Athletic Association county teams of Ireland.

The inaugural NFL was won by Laois, captained by Dick Miller. They defeated Sligo in the semi-final after a lost game was ordered replayed, and beat Dublin in a low-scoring final despite losing two players, Paddy Lenihan and Bill Keeley, to emigration shortly before the final.

== Format ==
The league was organised on a provincial basis with a separate league for each province: three leagues for Leinster due to the large number of counties. The six league winners played a knockout tournament to decide the National Football League. It is mentioned that the three Leinster Group winners played off (Longford scratching, Laois beating Dublin) for a gold medal, but this does not seem to have formed part of the league proper.

=== Knockout stage qualifiers ===
- Leinster: 3 teams
- Munster: 1 team
- Connacht: 1 team
- Ulster: 1 team

== Group stage ==
=== Connacht (Connacht Railway Cup) ===
==== Results ====
7 June 1925 Semi-final	Roscommon	1-5 — 0-7	Leitrim	Palace Grounds, Strokestown
				Referee: P. Kilduff Mayo

21 June 1925 Semi-final	Sligo	1-4 — 1-1	Mayo	Ballaghaderreen
				Referee: C. Flynn Leitrim

25 October 1925 Final	Sligo	5-2 — 0-2	Roscommon	Tubbercurry, Sligo

=== Leinster I ===
==== Results ====
13 September 1925 Round 1	Kildare	5-1 — 3-1	Meath	Navan

11 October 1925 Round 1	Louth	1-5 — 3-3	Dublin	Dundalk

18 October 1925 Round 2	Dublin	0-7 — 1-2	Meath	Croke Park, Dublin

25 October 1925 Round 2	Kildare	3-3 — 1-2	Louth	Newbridge

8 November 1925 Round 3	Dublin	2-5 — 1-3	Kildare	Croke Park, Dublin

8 November 1925 Round 3	Meath	1-7 — 3-5	Louth	Navan

==== Table ====
Team	Pld	W	D	L	Pts	Status
Dublin	3	3	0	0	6	Advance to Knockout stage
Kildare	3	2	0	1	4
Louth	3	1	0	2	2
Meath	3	0	0	3	0

=== Leinster II ===
==== Results ====
12 July 1925 Round 1	Westmeath	1-7 — 1-3	Offaly	Mullingar
				Referee: Joe Curran, Meath

11 October 1925 Round 1	Wicklow	0-3 — 2-7	Longford	Bray
				Referee: Mr. O'Brien, Dublin

25 October 1925 Round 2	Longford	2-6 — 0-3	Westmeath	Longford
				Referee: Mr. J. Kelly

15 November 1925 Round 3	Wicklow	5-8 — 1-3	Westmeath	Naas

15 November 1925 Round 3	Longford	1-8 — 1-2	Offaly	Longford Park

22 November 1925 Round 2	Offaly	1-3 — 1-4	Wicklow	Tullamore

==== Table ====
Team	Pld	W	D	L	Pts	Status
Longford	3	3	0	0	6	Advance to Knockout stage
Wicklow	3	2	0	1	4
Westmeath	3	1	0	2	0
Offaly	3	0	0	3	0

Westmeath forfeited the points from their win v Offaly due to being late on the field

=== Leinster III ===
==== Results ====
2 August 1925	Wexford	5-6 — 1-3	Carlow	Enniscorthy

20 September 1925	Carlow	1-4 — 2-5	Laois	Graiguecullen, Laois

11 October 1925	Kilkenny	1-2 — 3-5	Wexford	St James's Park, Kilkenny
				Referee: J Delaney

==== Table ====
Team	Pld	W	D	L	Pts	Status
Laois	3	3	0	0	6	Advance to Knockout stage
Wexford	3	2	0	1	4
Carlow	2	0	0	2	0
Kilkenny	2	0	0	2	0

=== Munster (Munster Football League) ===
Won by Kerry.

11 October 1925 1	Clare	1-4 — 3-6	Kerry	Milltown Malbay

15 November 1925 2	Cork	0-0 — 2-8	Kerry	Macroom

15 November 1925 2	Waterford	2-1 — 1-2	Limerick	Tipperary

22 November 1925 3	Waterford	1-0 — 0-12	Kerry	Waterford

29 November 1925 4	Kerry	3-4 — 2-0	Limerick	Listowel

29 November 1925 4	Waterford	1-2 — 2-3	Cork	Dungarvan

28 February 1926 5	Cork	0-4 — 1-0	Limerick	Fermoy

7 March 1926 5	Tipperary	2-5 — 1-4	Clare	Clonmel

13 June 1926 5	Kerry	0-5 — 0-2	Tipperary	Austin Stack Park, Tralee

=== Ulster (Dr McKenna Cup) ===
==== North-West Group ====
===== Regulation games =====
8 November 1925	Cavan	4-3 — 2-3	Fermanagh	Belturbet,
				Referee: J. Murphy Monaghan

29 November 1925	Tyrone	1-1 — 0-2	Fermanagh	Enniskillen,
				Referee: G. McGovern Cavan

29 November 1925	Donegal	6-5 — 3-5	Cavan	Ballyshannon,

20 December 1925	Donegal	1-5 — 2-1	Fermanagh	Stranorlar,

20 December 1925	Cavan	4-2 — 2-0	Tyrone	Dungannon,

17 January 1926	Tyrone	3-6 — 2-2	Donegal	Donaghmore,
				Referee: Mr. Cleary Antrim

===== Play-Offs =====
28 February 1926 Play-Off (2nd Place)	Donegal	4-3 — 3-6	Tyrone	Omagh,
				Attendance: 2,000

14 March 1926 Play-Off (2nd Place) Replay	Donegal	4-4 — 2-3	Tyrone	Omagh,
				Attendance: 6,000

28 March 1926 Play-Off (1st Place)	Cavan	4-8 — 2-4	Donegal	Ballyconnell,

==== North-East Group ====
===== Regulation games =====
1 November 1925	Antrim	0-7 — 0-5	Monaghan	Clones

6 December 1925	Armagh	2-6 — 3-1	Monaghan	Castleblaney,

13 December 1925	Antrim	1-6 — 2-2	Down	Castlewellan,
				Referee: P. Murray Armagh

24 January 1926	Armagh	3-0 — 2-0	Down	Hilltown

===== Play-Offs =====
7 March 1926 For 1st place (replay)	Antrim	1-4 — 0-3	Armagh	Newry
				Referee: P McGivern Down

==== Final ====
11 April 1926 Final	Antrim	2-5 — 0-5	Cavan	Belfast,
				Referee: J. Cooney Armagh

==== Final standings ====
===== North-West Group =====
Team	Pld	W	D	L	Pts	Status
Cavan	3	2	0	1	4
Donegal	3	2	0	1	4
Tyrone	3	2	0	1	4
Fermanagh	3	0	0	3	0

===== North-East Group =====
Team	Pld	W	D	L	Pts	Status
Antrim	3	2	1	0	5	Advance to Knockout stage
Armagh	3	2	1	0	5
Monaghan	2	0	0	2	0
Down	2	0	0	2	0

== Knockout stage ==
=== Quarter-finals ===
14 February 1926

Sligo	3-1 – 0-5	Longford

Longford

21 March 1926

Laois	1-6 – 1-5	Kerry

Croke Park, Dublin

=== Semi-finals ===
25 April 1926
Semi-final

Dublin	0-8 – 0-5	Antrim

Dundalk
Referee: T. Burke, Drogheda

9 May 1926
Semi-final

Sligo	3-5 – 2-6	Laois

Croke Park, Dublin

An objection was successfully made and a replay ordered.

27 June 1926
Semi-final replay

Laois	4-6 – 1-4	Sligo

Roscommon

=== Final ===
19 September 1926

Laois	2-1 – 1-0	Dublin
Jack Brown 2-0, Tom Costello 0-1		Peter Stynes 1-0

Barrett's Park, New Ross
Referee: P McCullagh (Wexford)

=== Leinster League inter-group ties ===
29 November 1925 Game 1	Longford	2-2 — 2-2	Dublin	Longford

- The game was initially awarded to Longford as Dublin failed to finish owing to a disputed decision. Later, the Leinster Council declared the result void and ordered a replay.

31 January 1926 Game 1 replay	Dublin	3-5 — 0-4	Longford	Mullingar

- Match was abandoned with seven minutes remaining. The game was awarded to Dublin

20 December 1925 Game 2	Laois	1-3 — 1-2	Dublin	Croke Park, Dublin

31 January 1926 Game 3	Laois	w/o — scr.	Longford	Portlaoise

- Longford did not play in protest at the fact that Game 1 replay versus Dublin was awarded to Dublin

==== Table ====
Team	Pld	W	D	L	Pts	Status
Laois	2	2	0	0	4	Leinster League winners
Dublin	2	1	0	1	2
Longford	2	0	0	2	0

Laois won the Leinster Football League. This would appear to have been a separate competition, and this ties did not form part of the National Football League proper.
