= Cyril Donnellan =

Galway hurler

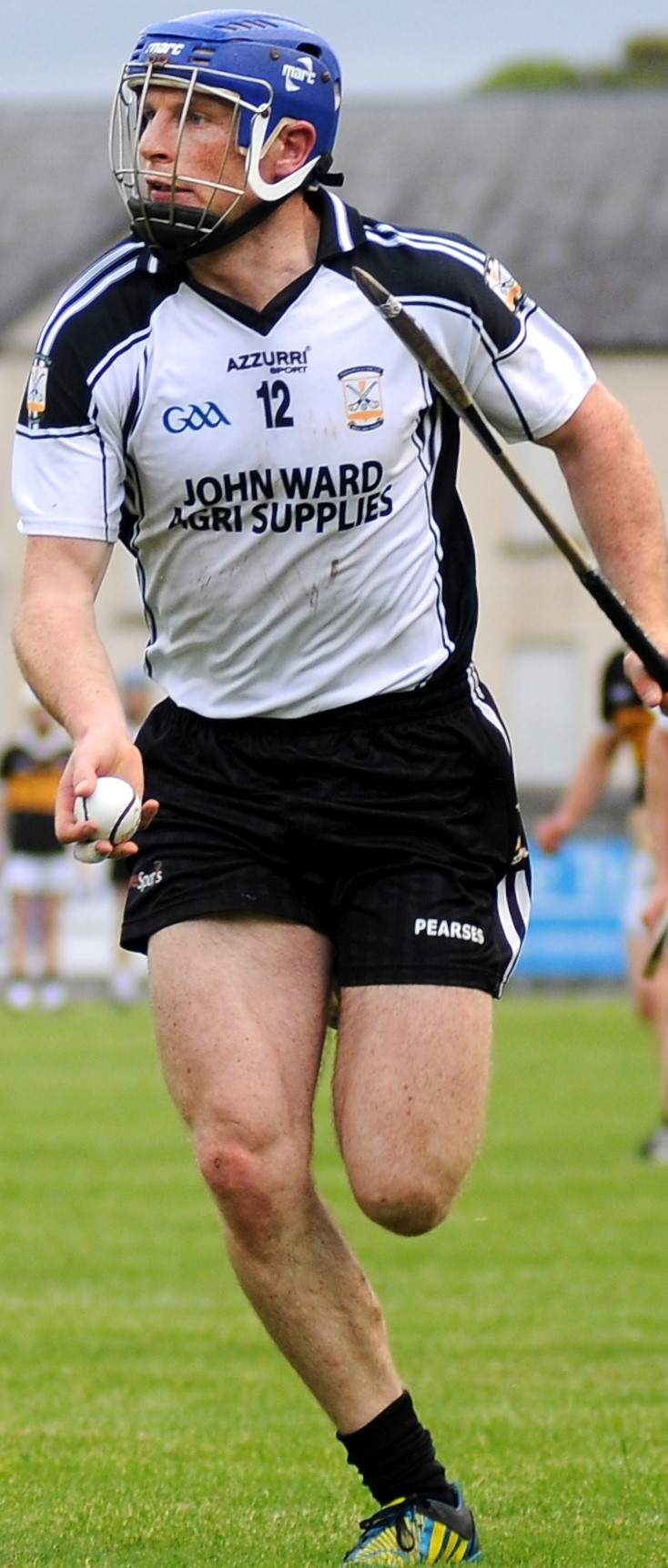

Personal information
- Native name: Coireall Ó Dómhnalláin (Irish)
- Born: 29 October 1985 (age 41) Ballinasloe, County Galway, Ireland
- Occupation: Secondary school teacher
- Height: 6 ft 0 in (183 cm)

Sport
- Sport: Hurling
- Position: Centre-forward
Club
- Years: Club
- Pádraig Pearse's
Club titles
- Galway titles: 0
College(s)
- Years: College
- Limerick Institute of Technology; University of Limerick
College titles
- Fitzgibbon titles: 1
Inter-county*
Years	County	Apps (scores)
2008–2017	Galway	35 (6-33)
Inter-county titles
- Leinster titles: 2
- All-Irelands: 1
- NHL: 2
- All Stars: 1
- *Inter County team apps and scores correct as of 17:26, 9 July 2012.

Cyril Donnellan (born 29 October 1985) is an Irish hurler and teacher. His league and championship career at senior level with the Galway county team lasted ten seasons from 2008 until 2017.

Donnellan made his first appearance for the team during the 2008 championship and immediately became a regular member of the starting fifteen. Since then he has won one Leinster medal and one National Hurling League medal.

On 3 September 2017, Donnellan was a substitute for Galway as they won their first All-Ireland Senior Hurling Championship in 29 years against Waterford.

In November 2017, Donnellan announced his retirement from inter-county hurling.

Donnellan was appointed deputy principal of Coláiste Bhaile Chláir in January 2022.

== Honours ==
Galway

- All-Ireland Senior Hurling Championship (1): 2017
- National Hurling League Division 1 (2): 2010, 2017
- Leinster Senior Hurling Championship (2): 2012, 2017
