= Hugh Milling =

Irish cricketer

Personal information
- Full name: Hugh Milling
- Born: 4 September 1962; Carrickfergus, Northern Ireland
- Died: 18 February 2003 (aged 40); Austria
- Batting: Right-handed
- Bowling: Right-arm fast-medium

Domestic team information
- Years: Team
- 1986–1988: Ireland

Career statistics
Competition	First-class	List A
Matches	1	3
Runs scored	6	9
Batting average	6.00	4.50
100s/50s	–/–	–/–
Top score	4*	9
Balls bowled	174	174
Wickets	6	7
Bowling average	16.33	19.57
5 wickets in innings	–	–
10 wickets in match	–	–
Best bowling	4/81	4/63
Catches/stumpings	1/–	1/–
- Source: Cricinfo, 23 October 2018

Hugh Milling (4 September 1962 – 18 February 2003) was an Irish first-class cricketer.

Milling was born at Carrickfergus and was educated at Marist College, Athlone, from there, he went up to Trinity College, Dublin. While studying in Dublin, he played club cricket for Dublin University and Phoenix. He made his debut for Ireland in a List A one-day game against Leicestershire at Leicester in the 1986 NatWest Trophy, taking 4/63 on debut with his fast-medium bowling. The following year he played in what would be his only match in first-class cricket, against Scotland at Coleraine. Batting twice during the match, Milling was dismissed in Ireland's first-innings for 2 runs by James Govan, while in their second-innings he ended unbeaten on 4 runs. With his hostile fast-medium bowling, he took six wickets in the match, claiming figures of 4/81 in Scotland's first-innings. He made two further appearances in List A cricket, against Northamptonshire in the 1987 NatWest Trophy, and Gloucestershire in the 1988 NatWest Trophy. He took a total of 9 wickets in his three List A matches, averaging 19.57 runs per wicket.

Having studied for a diploma in education at Ulster University, Milling moved into the teaching profession. He taught for a while in Northern Ireland, before accepting a position with Hulme Grammar School in Oldham, England. His move to England saw him play his club cricket in the Lancashire League with Werneth. He accompanied the school on a visit to Austria in 2003; while skiing he fell and hit his head. Seemingly uninjured, he retired to his hotel room, but died that night in his sleep from a head injury that resulted from the fall.
