= Markus Casey =

Irish aerial archaeologist

- Born: 1957; Dublin, Ireland
- Died: 11 May, 2008 (aged 51); Kilmovee, County Mayo
- Cause of death: Airplane crash
- Education: University College Dublin; Coláiste Iognáid
- Occupations: Archaeologist; pilot
- Known for: Aerial archaeology
- Notable work: The coastal Promontory Forts of Ireland

Markus Casey (1957-11 May 2008) was an Irish archaeologist who specialized in Aerial archaeology. His research in the 1990s, using aerial photography, revealed many prehistoric archaeological sites on the coast of Ireland that were previously unknown. He worked as an archeological consultant and also managed a light aircraft maintenance company. Casey died in a plane crash in 2008.

== Early life and education ==
Casey was born in Dublin, Ireland. His family later moved to Galway where he attended Coláiste Iognáid (Ignatius College). Upon completing school, he moved to Germany where he worked in a factory, earning enough money to support his further travels. He cycled south through Europe and the Balkans, and later spent time in Athens, Greece There, he attended the British School at Athens. He returned to Ireland the following year. He enrolled at University College Dublin, where he studied Archaeology and Classical Civilization, graduating with a BA degree with honours in 1981. Casey also pursued his new interest in flying.

== Career ==
After graduation, Casey was employed for a year at the Museum of London, where he worked on a television documentary about Inishark, a small island near the coast of Galway. During this period, he participated in archaeological excavations in Galway. Later, he worked on his Master's degree, combining his background in archaeology with his interest in flying and aerial photography. His research, using aerial archeology, revealed that many Irish coastal ring forts and other archeological sites in the counties of Clare, Galway, Mayo and Sligo, previously unknown, were not included on the Ordnance Survey Maps of Ireland.

Casey had a commercial pilot's license and managed a light aircraft maintenance company, Shoreline Aviation in Knock, Ireland. He also worked as a consulting archaeologist, conducting aerial and terrestrial archeological surveys for infrastructure projects.

== Personal life ==
Casey was an avid pilot. He lived in Salthill, Galway with his family. He died on 11 May 2008, when he crashed his Beechcraft Skipper plane in Kilmovee, County Mayo. He was 51 years old at the time of his death. He is survived by his son, Tim, and his extended family.

== Select bibliography ==
- Casey, Markus (1999). The coastal Promontory Forts of Ireland (PhD). University College, Dublin.
- Casey, Markus (1999). "Excavation at the Promontory Fort at Doonamo, Aughernacallaigh, Co. Mayo". Journal of the Galway Archaeological and Historical Society. 51: 65–7665–76.
- Casey, Markus (2003). "Aerial Reconnaissance". Archaeology Ireland. 17: 30–33.
- Casey, Markus (2004). "Review of Eagles over Ireland: Athenry and Flying Fortress 1943 by Paul Brown". Journal of the Galway Archaeological and Historical Society: 244–245.
