= Daniel Riordan (rugby union) =

Irish rugby player (born 1984)

- Born: Daniel Riordan; 25 September 1984 (age 42) Galway, Ireland
- Height: 1.78 m (5 ft 10 in)
- Weight: 91 kg (14 st 5 lb)
- School: Coláiste Iognáid
- University: NUI Galway

Rugby union career
- Position(s): Fullback, Wing
- Current team: Old Belvedere
Amateur team(s)
Years	Team	Apps	(Points)
- Corinthians
2009-2010	UL Bohemians		
2010-	Old Belvedere		
Senior career
Years	Team	Apps	(Points)
2005-2009	Connacht	46	(88)
2009-2010	Munster Rugby	0	(0)
2010-2011	Leinster	1	(0)
- Correct as of 4 March 2011
International career
Years	Team	Apps	(Points)
- Ireland U21
2007-08	Ireland A	3	(0)
- Correct as of 9 Feb 2015

Daniel Riordan (born 25 September 1984) is a rugby union player for Old Belvedere in the All-Ireland League. He began playing rugby at Coláiste Iognáid, where he won a schools' senior cup in 2002 and was on the Connacht Schools team in 2000 and 2001.

== Career ==
Upon leaving Coláiste Iognáid in Galway, Riordan continued to play for Galway Corinthians RFC and entered the Connacht Rugby Academy.

Upon receiving a full contract with Connacht, Riordan then played his club rugby for Buccaneers RFC in Athlone. He recently played club rugby for is also contracted to UL Bohemians R.F.C. in Limerick, who play in AIB League Division 2. But for season 2010–11 Riordan moved to Dublin and now plays for Old Belvedere RFC, and has been called into the Leinster Rugby squad for their Magners League fixture against Scarlets on 04/03/2011.

Daniel Riordan's position of choice is as a Full-back and he can also operate as a Centre or on the Wing.

A former U-21 International, Riordan was called into the Ireland A side that was defeated by England Saxons on 1 February 2008.
