= Andrew Browne (rugby union) =

Irish rugby union player (born 1987)

- Born: 21 January 1987 (age 39) Galway, Ireland
- Height: 1.96 m (6 ft 5 in)
- Weight: 116 kg (18 st 4 lb)
- School: St. Joseph's Patrician College
- University: NUI Galway
- Notable relative: Damian Browne (brother)

Rugby union career
- Position: Lock
Amateur team(s)
Years	Team	Apps	(Points)
2004–2005 2005–2018	Our Lady's Boys Club Galwegians		
Senior career
Years	Team	Apps	(Points)
2007–2018	Connacht	156	(5)
- Correct as of 28 April 2018
International career
Years	Team	Apps	(Points)
2007	Ireland U20	5	(0)
2011	Ireland Wolfhounds	1	(0)
- Correct as of 16 March 2026
Coaching career
- Years: Team
- 2021-26: Connacht Rugby (Elite Player Development Officer0
- 2024-25: Ireland U20 (Assistant)
- 2025–26: Ireland U20

Andrew Browne (born 21 January 1987) is a rugby union player from Ireland. Browne is a versatile forward, able to play as a flanker or a lock. Browne most recently played professionally for Irish provincial side Connacht Rugby. His older brother Damian Browne is also a rugby player, and formerly played for Connacht and Leinster.

== Early life ==
Browne was born in Galway and grew up in Renmore. He attended St. Joseph's Patrician College, commonly known as The Bish. Browne played rugby for local clubs Our Lady's Boys Club and Galwegians. When was growing up his brother Damian, who is seven years older than him, played for Connacht, but the older Browne left the team in 2004, almost three years before Andrew made his own debut.

Browne studied at NUI Galway.

== Career ==
=== Connacht ===
A product of the province's academy, Browne made his senior debut for Connacht in the 2006–07 Celtic League, coming on as a replacement against the Cardiff Blues on 7 April 2007, in a match that finished level, at 16 points apiece. He made one further appearance in the league that season, also as a replacement.

Browne made his first ever European appearance in the 2007–08 European Challenge Cup, coming on as a replacement against El Salvador. He also made his first start for Connacht during the season, lining out against Edinburgh in the 2007–08 Celtic League on 21 March 2008. In addition to this, Browne started one other game and made three appearances from the bench in the league that season.

The following season saw Browne become a regular for Connacht. He featured in all seven of the province's 2008–09 Challenge Cup games, starting in five of them, including the quarter-final clash with Northampton Saints. Browne played in 14 of Connacht's 18 games in the 2008–09 Celtic League, starting in nine of them. Browne scored his first try for Connacht on 8 May 2009 in a league game against Irish rivals Ulster.

Browne played in only two games in the 2009–10 European Challenge Cup as Connacht reached the semi-finals. In that season's league he made 13 appearances, but started on just five occasions. At the end of the season Michael Bradley, who had coached Connacht for the entirety of Browne's time with the senior team, stood down from his position and was replaced with Eric Elwood, who had coached Browne at Under 20 level internationally.

The following season saw Browne once again playing regular first team rugby for Connacht. He played in all six of the team's games in the 2010–11 Challenge Cup, but Connacht failed to progress from their group. In the 2010–11 Celtic League, which had been expanded to twelve teams with the addition of two Italian teams, Browne started 14 games, and came on as a replacement in a further four.

Browne missed the entirety of the 2011–12 season for Connacht, in what was the province's debut season in the Heineken Cup, following an injury sustained during the pre-season. The 2011–12 season also saw the league renamed as the Pro12, due to the addition of Italian teams. Browne returned to the team after more than a year's absence in the 2012–13 Pro12 match with Scarlets in September 2012. He made a total of 16 appearances in the league that season, 13 of these coming as starts. Browne made his Heineken Cup debut when he started Connacht's pool stage game against Biarritz, which the province won by a score of 22–14.He went on to start three more of Connacht's games in the competition. Browne signed an extension to his Connacht contract in March 2013, agreeing to stay with the team until the end of the 2014–15 season.

Elwood left his post at the end of the 2012–13 season and was replaced by Pat Lam. In Lam's first season in charge, Browne made 18 appearances in the league, starting 11 times. In the 2013–14 Heineken Cup Browne started three games and came on as a replacement in a further two. On 4 January 2014, Browne made his 100th appearance for Connacht against Leinster.

Browne suffered from injury issues in the 2014–15 season, which limited the number of appearances he made. He played just eight times in the 2014–15 Pro12, starting only twice. He featured in four of Connacht's six pool games in the 2014–15 Challenge Cup however, and started in the quarter-final defeat to Gloucester.

=== International ===
Browne has represented Ireland internationally at youth level, playing for the country at Under 19 and Under 20 level. He was part of the Irish team that won the Grand Slam in the U20 Six Nations in 2007. The grand slam winning team was coached by Browne's future Connacht coach Eric Elwood. Browne has also played for the second tier international "A" side, known as the Ireland Wolfhounds.

== Coaching Career ==
Browne worked as player development officer with Connacht and became part of the coaching team of the Ireland national under-20 rugby union team in 2024. In October 2025 he took over as head coach from Neil Doak. Under his leadership, Ireland won the Triple Crown in the 2026 Six Nations Under 20s Championship.
