= List of Jesuit schools in Ireland =

Jesuit schools in Ireland include:

== Primary schools ==
- Scoil Iognáid, Galway
- St Declan's School, Dublin
- Gardiner St. School, Dublin

== Secondary schools ==
- Belvedere College, Dublin, founded in 1832
- Clongowes Wood College, County Kildare, founded in 1814
- Coláiste Iognáid, Galway, founded in 1861
- Crescent College Comprehensive, Limerick, founded in 1859
- Gonzaga College, Dublin, founded in 1950
- Mungret College, Limerick, founded in 1882; merged with Crescent College Comprehensive in 1973
- St Stanislaus College, Tullabeg, Offaly, founded in 1818; merged with Clongowes Wood College in 1886
