= Coláiste Éinde =

Secondary school in Galway, Ireland

- St. Enda's
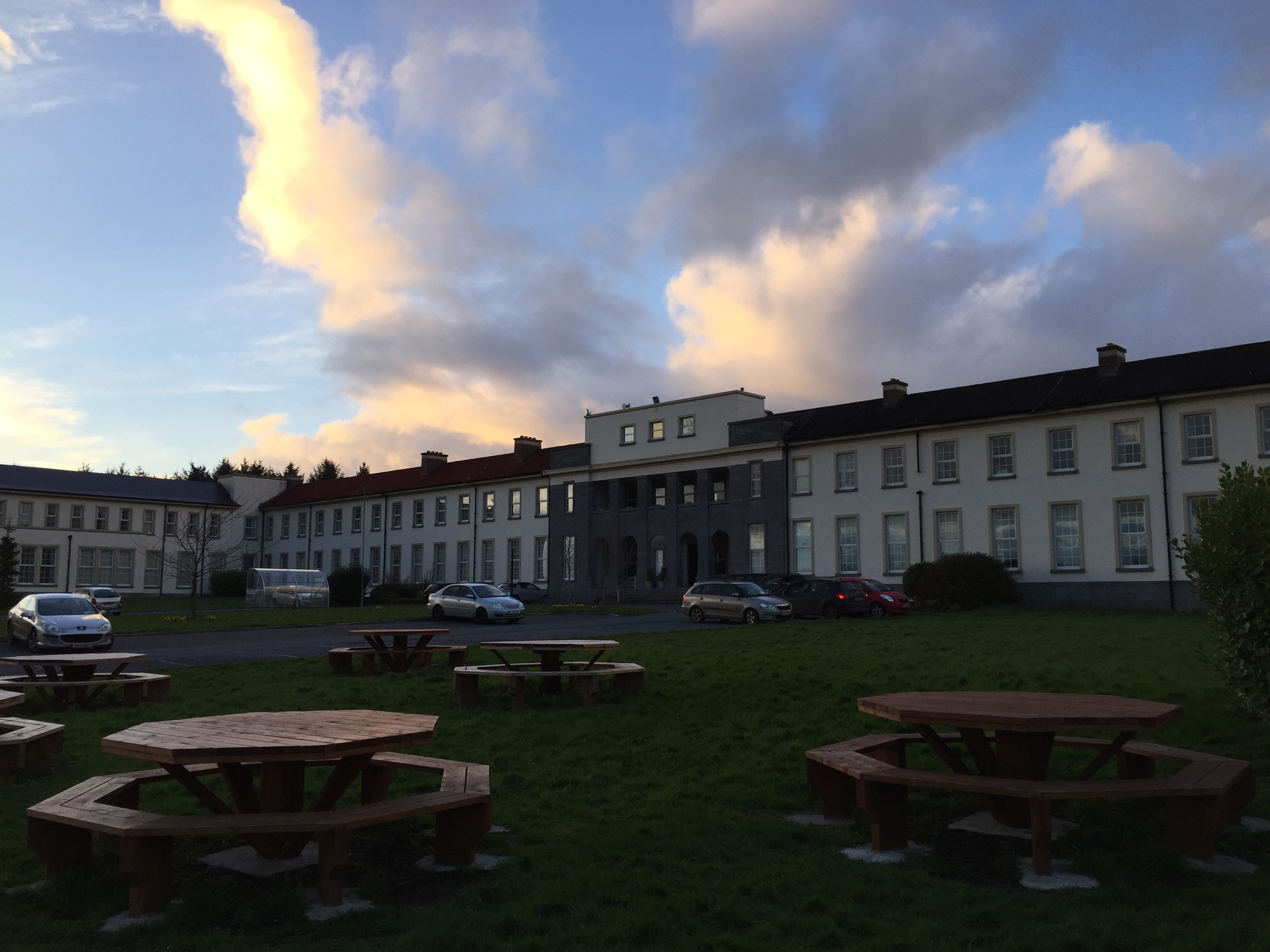

Location
- Threadneedle Road; Salthill, Galway, H91 X798; Ireland; 53°15′56″N 9°05′23″W

Information
- Type: Voluntary
- Motto: Latin: Nec Ardua Terrent (The arduous does not deter)
- Religious affiliations: Roman Catholic; Diocesan college
- Established: 1928; 98 years ago
- Principal: Ursula Diamond
- Gender: Co-educational
- Age: 12 to 18
- Enrollment: approx. 800 (2026)
- Colours: Blue; Yellow
- Website: colaisteeinde.ie

Coláiste Éinde (English: St. Enda's College), a co-educational secondary school, is located on Threadneedle Road in Salthill in Galway, Ireland. Founded in 1928, it is a diocesan college. The main school building, completed in the 1930s, is included on the Record of Protected Structures maintained by Galway City Council. As of 2026, the school had approximately 800 pupils enrolled.

== History ==
Coláiste Éinde was founded in Furbo, County Galway on 23 October 1928, shortly after the establishment of the Irish State. The school was originally established as a residential preparatory college to educate boys through the medium of Irish and prepare students to progress to St Patrick's College and obtain employment as national school teachers. Entry was based on a difficult scholarship exam. The original building was Blake's House in Furbo. The school's stay in this house was brief and they left at Christmas in 1930 and moved to Talbot House in Talbot Street, Dublin, the following month. In 1934, the school moved to Glasnevin in Dublin.

In 1929, construction began on a dedicated building on Threadneedle Road in Salthill. It was originally earmarked as a three-storey preparatory college for nuns run by the Sisters of St. Louis. However, when Bishop Thomas O'Doherty found out that a new order of nuns were coming into his diocese, he put a stop to the construction. Following his death in 1936, he was succeeded by Bishop Browne. A solution was found and construction resumed. The building was finished by Stewarts on a smaller scale than had been planned and opened on 10 October 1937. The total cost of construction amounted to £85,394.

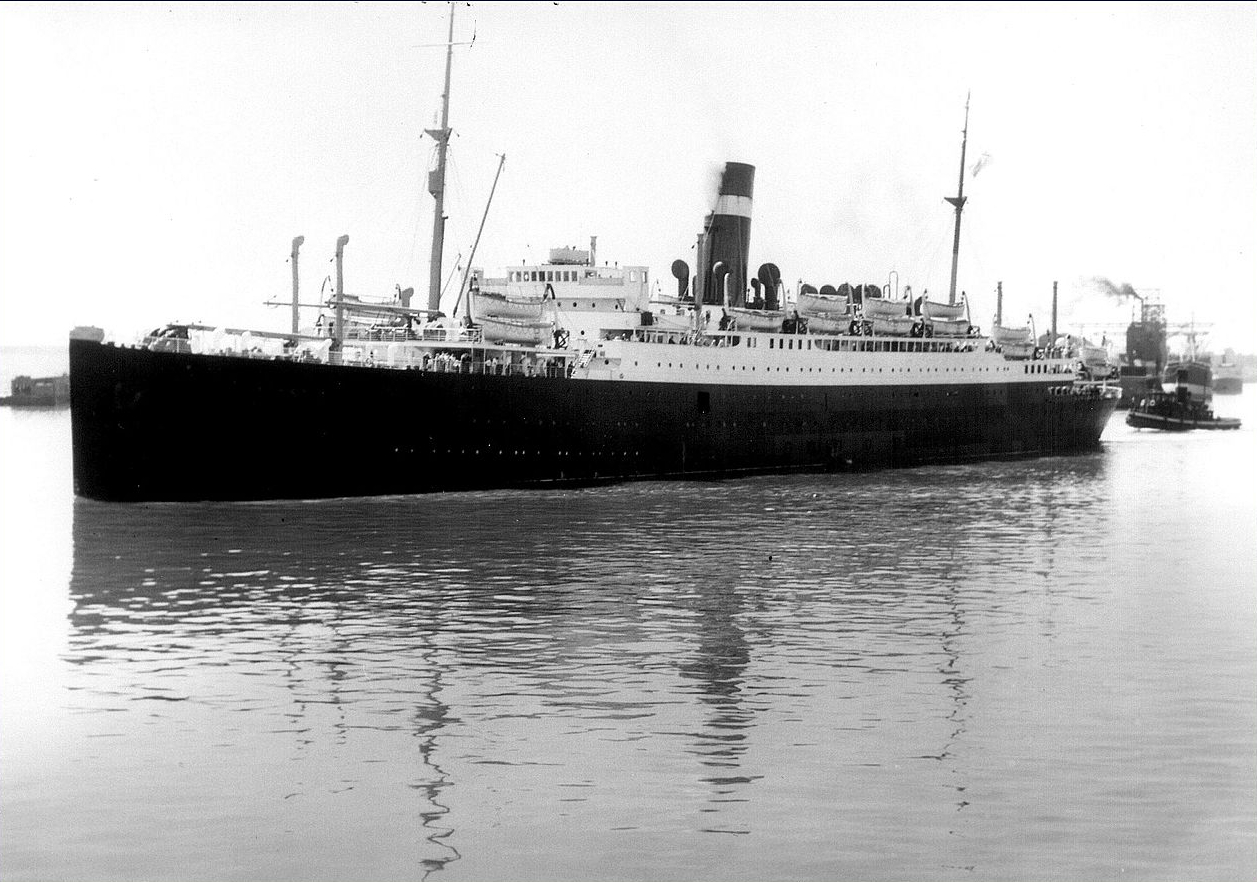
SS Athenia

At the outbreak of World War II, the SS Athenia was torpedoed off the west coast of Ireland; the passengers were rescued by a Norwegian ship called the MS Knute Nelson, and taken to Galway. The school was converted to a military hospital and survivors were offered refuge. A red cross was painted on the roof and students were temporarily moved to Dublin.

In 1961, the school became a regular secondary school and day pupils began to be enrolled. Further change happened in 1986 when all boarding was discontinued, and in 1992 it became co-educational and the first girls were admitted.

The school building underwent a series of renovations in 2012 and 2023, with additions to the existing structure and the completion of new classrooms.

== Governance ==
Coláiste Éinde is managed by a board of management under the patronage of the Diocese of Galway. The school has a compulsory uniform. Students follow the Junior Cycle and Leaving Certificate programmes, with six base classes per year.

== Namesake ==
The school is named after Saint Enda of Aran, a 6th century saint who founded a monastic settlement on Inis Mór.

== Curriculum ==
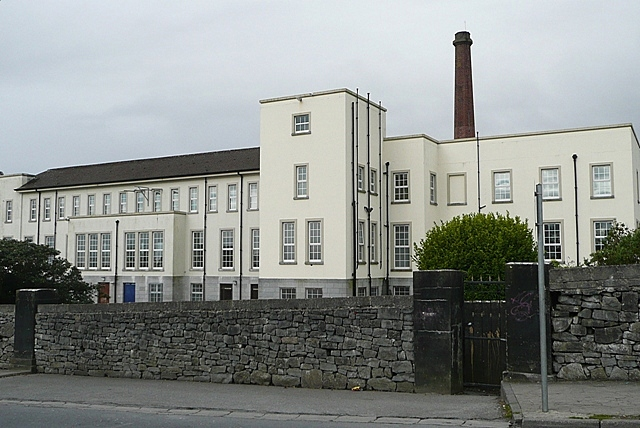
The school seen from Threadneedle Road

Junior Cycle students at Colaiste Éinde study the core subjects of Irish, English, Mathematics, Science, Geography, History and Religious education over a three-year period. They also choose one language from French, German or Spanish along with three additional subjects of either Business studies, Graphics, Woodwork, Art, Music or Home economics. Additionally there are four non-examinable subjects - computers, physical education, SPHE, and CSPE.

The school offers a Transition Year programme however it is not compulsory.

For the two-year Senior Cycle, students continue to study Irish, English and Mathematics as core subjects as well as a modern foreign language, and choose three additional Leaving Certificate subjects from those offered by the school. The Leaving Certificate Vocational Programme (LCVP) is also offered. Religious education and PE are included as non-examinable subjects.

The school also provides a variety of student supports along with career guidance. There is also a school chaplain. As well as that, there is a dedicated deaf class and an ASD class. It is a DEIS school.

== Sport and extracurricular activities ==
=== Basketball ===
Coláiste Éinde has competed in various All-Ireland competitions in basketball, with both boys and girls teams achieving titles at several age levels.

The U14 boys team were the All-Ireland 'A' Basketball Cup champions in 2024. The U16 boys team won the All-Ireland 'B' Cup in 2018. In 2010, both the U16 and U19 boys topped the All Ireland 'C' Leagues.

In 2019, the U16 girls team completed the double by winning the All-Ireland 'A' Cup and League titles. The U15 girls won the All-Ireland 'A' Cup in 2018 and in 2017 the U14 girls won the All-Ireland 'A' Cup.

=== Football ===
In 2026, the U15 girls association football (soccer) team won the FAI Schools Minor Connacht Cup and finished runners up in the FAI Schools Minor National Cup, losing to St. Brigid's, Killarney.

=== Gaelic games ===
The senior boys Gaelic football team were crowned All-Ireland Senior 'B' champions in 1981. The senior hurling team reached the All-Ireland Post Primary School 'D' Hurling final in 2024 but lost to St Mary's Newport.

=== Rugby ===
The school won the Connacht Senior B Cup in 2012 and again in 2022. In 2009, the Junior team won the Connacht Junior Emerging Cup and in 2018 they won the Connacht Development League.

=== Other sports ===
The school sailing team won the Connacht and Ulster Schools Team Racing Championships in 2026. Other sports undertaken at the school include athletics, volleyball and golf.

=== Other activities ===
Pupils from the school are also involved in debating, science and maths quizzes and student enterprise competitions. In 2023, representatives from the school won 'Best Commercial Potential' at the National Student Enterprise Awards. In debating, the school was represented at the International Competition for Young Debaters (ICYD) in Cambridge in 2025.

== Notable alumni ==
=== Sport ===
- Rory Ginty, former professional footballer for Crystal Palace FC
- John Hanbury, all-Ireland winning hurler
- Daryl Horgan, footballer for Dundalk FC and formerly of Preston North End and Hibernian FC; 17 caps for the Republic of Ireland
- Joe McDonagh, hurler and 32nd president of the GAA
- Séamus Ó Riain, hurler and Gaelic footballer and 22nd president of the GAA

=== Arts and media ===
- Seán 'ac Dhonncha, traditional Irish singer
- Breandán Ó hEithir, writer and broadcaster

=== Politics ===
- John Connolly, Fianna Fáil TD for Galway West
- Pat "the Cope" Gallagher, Fianna Fáil TD for Donegal and former Minister of State and MEP
- Denis Gallagher, former Fianna Fáil TD and Minister for the Gaeltacht

== See also ==
- List of schools in the Republic of Ireland
- Knocknacarra
