= Harry McGee =

Irish journalist

- Born: Salthill, County Galway, Ireland
- Education: University College Galway; BA (1987); HDip (1989); LLB (1993); Barrister-at-Law (1995)
- Occupation: Political journalist
- Notable credit(s): Young Journalist of the Year; Irish Examiner Political editor The Irish Times Political correspondent
- Spouse: Fiona Breslin
- Children: One daughter

Harry McGee is the political correspondent with The Irish Times. He has previously worked for several publications, including being political editor of the Irish Examiner, as well as jobs with the Sunday Tribune, the Sunday Press, the Connacht Tribune newspapers, public service broadcaster RTÉ and has also edited Magill. He has appeared as a commentator on RTÉ Radio 1, Newstalk and TV3.

McGee is originally from Salthill, County Galway. His mother, Eithne Conway-McGee, was a doctor, and was President of the Irish College of General Practitioners for a time. He studied at Coláiste Iognáid and at University College Galway, earning a BA (1987), HDip (1989) and LLB (1993). He has won the award for Young Journalist of the Year. He left his job as the political editor with the Irish Examiner to take up a new job with The Irish Times in January 2008 and was promoted to the post of political correspondent for that publication in December 2009.

McGee wrote, presented and produced the seven-part GUBU podcast series for The Irish Times in 2022. He has also written and presented several TV documentaries for RTÉ and TG4 and wrote the RTÉ Legacy Documentaries on Martin McGuinness and P. J. Mara.

More recently, he wrote The Murderer and the Taoiseach, based on the podcast series.

His main pastimes are the GAA and mountaineering. He played hurling and football with Salthill-Knocknacarra and FitzGibbon Cup hurling with the University of Galway. He is chairperson of Ranelagh Gaels GAA club in South Dublin.

== Bibliography ==
- McGee, Harry (2023). The Murderer and the Taoiseach: Death, Politics and GUBU - Revisiting the Notorious Malcolm Macarthur Case. Hachette.
