= Seán Mac Réamoinn =

Irish journalist and broadcaster (1921-2007)

Seán Mac Réamoinn (27 November 1921 – 17 January 2007) was an Irish journalist and broadcaster. He took a deep interest in Irish culture and language and religious affairs.

Mac Réamoinn was born in Birmingham, the third child of James and Wilhelmina Redmond. His father was from Boolavogue, County Wexford, and the family returned to Ireland two years after his birth. He was educated in Clonmel Christian Brothers School and at Coláiste Iognáid in Galway before attending University College, Galway. He became a fluent Irish and French speaker.

Mac Réamoinn entered the Irish diplomatic service in 1944. He transferred to Radio Éireann, then a part of the civil service, when the station was expanded in 1947. For several years he was part of the outside broadcast unit along with Seamus Ennis and travelled the country recording and collecting folklore. He helped the revival of Irish traditional music through introducing regional styles to a national audience and providing a platform for young musicians.

He became a member of the station's governing body, the RTÉ Authority. From 1962 to 1965, he reported on the Second Vatican Council.

Mac Réamoinn regularly wrote for newspapers and magazines in both Irish and English. He was a member of the editorial board of Scripture in Church since its beginnings, in the Spring of 1971.

== Select writings ==
- Vaticáin II agus an Réabhlóid Cultúrtha (Vatican II and the Cultural Revolution, 1987)
- The Pleasures of Gaelic Poetry (ed) (1982)
- The Synod on the Laity: An Outsider's Diary (1987)
- Laylines (1993).

== See also ==
- List of Irish music collectors
