= Damian Browne =

Irish rugby union player (born 1980)

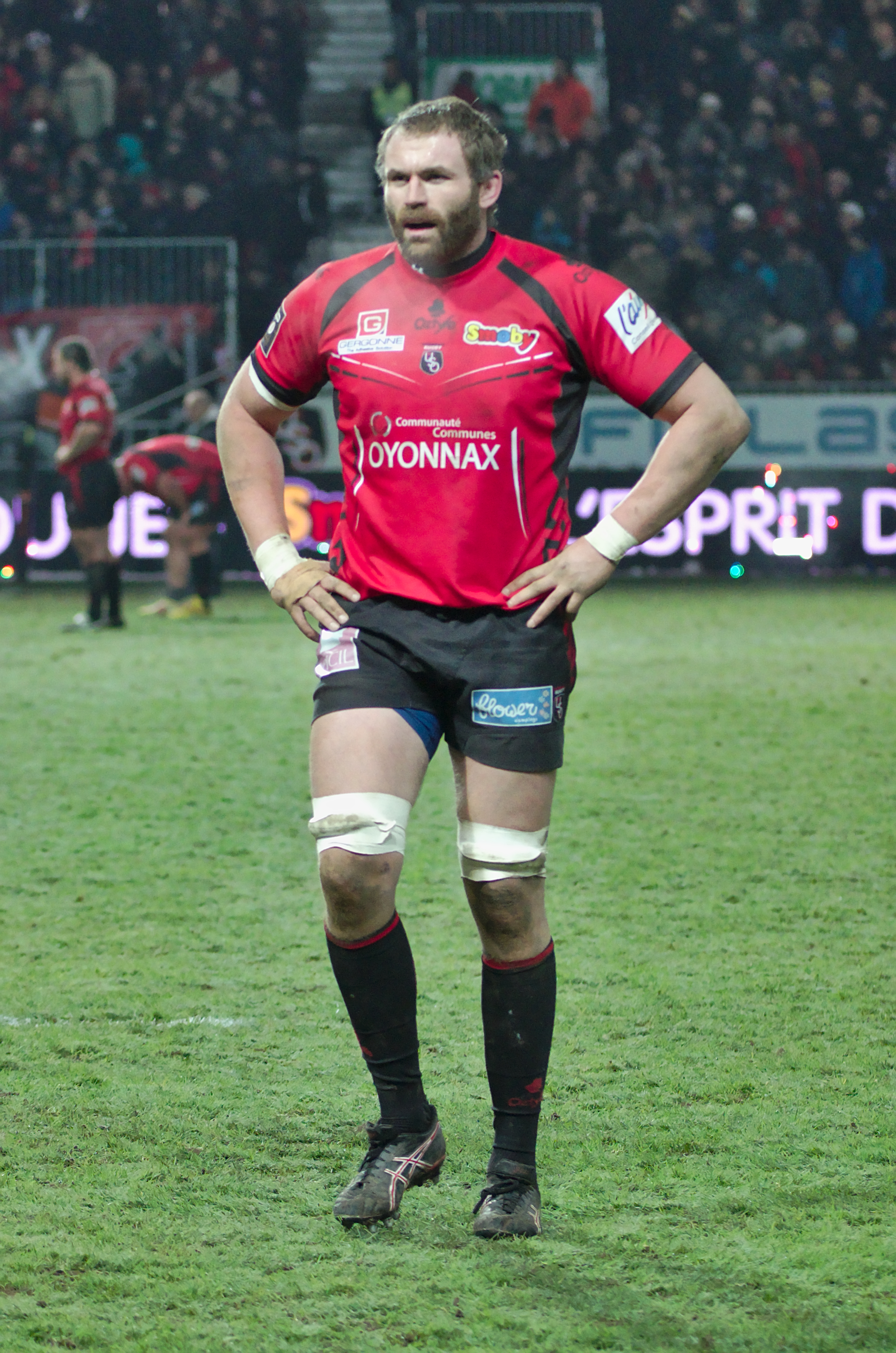
- Born: Damian Browne; 17 May 1980 (age 46) Galway, Ireland
- Height: 1.96 m (6 ft 5 in)
- Weight: 122 kg (19 st 3 lb)
- School: St. Joseph's Patrician College
- Occupation: Extreme Adventurer/ Public Speaker

Rugby union career
- Position: Lock
Amateur team(s)
Years	Team	Apps	(Points)
1998–2001	Galwegians		
Senior career
Years	Team	Apps	(Points)
2001–2004	Connacht	63	
2004–2008	Northampton Saints	85	(5)
2008–2011	Brive	74	(10)
2011–2013	Leinster	31	(5)
2013–2015	Oyonnax	27	(5)
- Correct as of 3 January 2015
International career
Years	Team	Apps	(Points)
1999	Ireland U19		
2001	Ireland U21	7	(0)
2006	Ireland A		(0)
- Correct as of 17 June 2006

Official website
- www.damianbrowne.com

Damian Browne (born 17 May 1980) is an Irish former professional rugby union player turned extreme adventurer. Browne was capped by Ireland at U-21 level. He has played for Connacht, Northampton Saints, Brive, Leinster and Oyonnax.

He began his career with Galwegians before earning a contract with Connacht in 2001. He agreed to sign for Northampton Saints in April 2004. Browne signed for Leinster in May 2011 along with Fionn Carr. His younger brother, Andrew played for Connacht.

Browne was the first person to row from New York City to Galway, Ireland, completing his trip on 4 October 2022, after 112 days at sea. In 2017 Browne completed the Atlantic Challenge solo after 63 days, six hours and 25 minutes at sea.
