= Coláiste Chiaráin (Athlone) =

Secondary school in County Roscommon, Ireland

Location
- Summerhill; Athlone, County Roscommon, N37 AH97; Ireland
- 53.4085°N 7.987°W

Information
- School type: State-funded Voluntary secondary school
- Religious affiliation: Catholic
- Patron saint: Diocese of Elphin
- Established: 2017
- Status: Open
- Principal: Brendan Waldron (since 2017)
- Gender: Co-educational
- Enrolment: approx. 770
- Language: English
- Campus type: Suburban
- Website: www.ccathlone.ie

Coláiste Chiaráin is a co-educational Catholic voluntary secondary school in Summerhill on the western side of Athlone, County Roscommon, Ireland. The school was established in 2017 following the amalgamation of St Joseph's Convent Summerhill, and St. Aloysius College, Athlone, and operates under the trusteeship of the Diocese of Elphin. Its purpose-built three-storey campus at Summerhill came into use in 2020 and was officially opened in May 2023. As of 2023 it catered for about 770 students from Athlone and surrounding areas.

== History ==
Plans for a new diocesan co-educational secondary school serving the west side of Athlone were developed in the mid-2010s under the patronage of the Diocese of Elphin. In February 2016 the diocese announced that the new school, to be located at Summerhill, would be called Coláiste Chiaráin and would be created through the amalgamation of St Aloysius College and St Joseph's College. The new school was described at the time as the only secondary school on the west side of Athlone, serving up to 800 students.

An interim board of management was established, and in January 2017 Brendan Waldron was appointed as the school's first principal. Coláiste Chiaráin opened to students at the start of the 2017–18 school year, initially using existing facilities at the Summerhill site while a new building was being planned and procured.

Construction of a new purpose-built school building at Summerhill was advanced under the Department of Education's post-primary school building programme. By 2017 local representatives reported progress on the project following ministerial approval. The new three-storey building, with a floor area of approximately 10,864 m^{2}, was constructed on the Summerhill campus and included the demolition of the existing secondary school structures.

The new building came into use in 2020 during the COVID-19 pandemic. Its formal opening took place on 5 May 2023, when Bishop Kevin Doran, as patron, performed the official ceremony in the presence of Minister of State Peter Burke and representatives of the school community. On the day of the opening local media reported that the €20–24 million campus was designed to accommodate up to 1,000 students.

By 2025 the school was reported as operating at capacity, five years after moving into the new building.

== Campus ==
Coláiste Chiaráin occupies a three-storey purpose-built campus at Summerhill, just inside the Roscommon border on the western approach to Athlone along the R446 (old Galway Road). The development includes general classrooms, specialist rooms, external ball courts, car parking and associated site works.

At the time of the official opening in 2023 the new facility was reported as having 37 classrooms, six science laboratories, four technology rooms, two home economics kitchens, an art and multimedia room, a PE hall, fitness rooms and a gym. An oratory was fitted out as part of the project.

== Governance and ethos ==
Coláiste Chiaráin is a Catholic voluntary secondary school under the trusteeship of the Diocese of Elphin. It is managed by a board of management representing the trustees, parents and teaching staff.

School literature emphasises an ethos rooted in Catholic education while welcoming students from all backgrounds and faith communities, with a focus on academic progress, pastoral care and extra-curricular participation.

== Student body and curriculum ==
The school is co-educational and enrols students from Athlone and its hinterland in south Roscommon and nearby parts of County Westmeath. In 2023 the enrolment was reported as approximately 770 students.

Students follow the national Junior Cycle curriculum for their first three years, typically studying a core group of subjects with a selection of options chosen after a taster programme. At senior cycle the school offers a Transition Year (TY) programme and the established Leaving Certificate, with a range of optional subjects including sciences, construction studies, accounting and other subjects depending on demand.

A school prospectus published in 2019 noted the provision of supervised evening study, homework support and a student council elected from across year groups. School self-evaluation reports have referred to ongoing work on assessment, reporting and engagement in learning, including the introduction of one-hour classes and redevelopment of the TY curriculum.

== Co-curricular and community links ==
Coláiste Chiaráin runs a range of co-curricular and extra-curricular activities, including sports, cultural initiatives and student leadership programmes, as referenced in its prospectus and school publications.

The school has participated in external educational programmes. In 2023–25 Coláiste Chiaráin hosted the Irish Funds Transition Year Financial Literacy Programme, with industry volunteers delivering sessions on investment, fraud awareness and career pathways in financial services; Minister of State Robert Troy attended one of the sessions in 2025 to present certificates to students. Irish Funds has highlighted Coláiste Chiaráin Athlone as one of the participating schools in its national financial literacy initiative.

== Transport and road safety ==
The school is located on the R446, the former Athlone–Galway road, at Summerhill. Since the opening of the new building in 2020 there have been repeated local concerns about traffic speed and pedestrian safety in the vicinity, particularly for students crossing the road. In 2023, three years after the move to the new campus, parents and local representatives again expressed dissatisfaction with the level of traffic calming measures outside the school.

Coláiste Chiaráin, together with the nearby primary school at Summerhill, applied for inclusion in the national Safe Routes to School programme, and funding for related active travel works at Summerhill has been referenced in local authority reports and in the National Transport Authority's Active Travel Investment Grants allocations. Roscommon County Council has reported on measures such as ramps and tree-cutting along the R446 near the school in response to councillors' queries.
