= Scoil Chonglais =

Post-primary school in the Republic of Ireland

Coordinates: 52.9377°N 6.7017°W

Scoil Chonglais is a post-primary school in Baltinglass, County Wicklow in Ireland. It operates under the Kildare and Wicklow Education and Training Board (KWETB). As of 2024, the school had an enrollment of 465 students. It is known for its hands-on style of education.
