= Dungarvan College =

- Coláiste Dhun Garbhán
- Youghal Road, Dungarvan, County Waterford, Ireland

Information
- Former name: Coláiste Chathail Naofa
- School type: Public multidenominational
- Established: 1993
- Principal: Danny Cunningham
- Deputy Principal: Jason Ryan
- Enrollment: 236 (2022)
- Website: https://dungarvancollege.ie/

Dungarvan College (Irish: Coláiste Dhun Garbhán) is a post-primary educational institution in Dungarvan, County Waterford, Ireland. The school offers Junior Certificate and Leaving Certificate programmes, as well as Post Leaving Certificate and Further Education courses.

== History ==
At the time of its founding, Dungarvan College was named after Saint Cathaldus, who was born near Kilcannon, County Waterford and who established a monastic settlement in Lismore, County Waterford in the 7th century.

Historically based on Wolfe Tone Road in Dungarvan, the school has been at its present location since 2002, when a new building was opened.

== Progression to WIT ==
Waterford Institute of Technology offers preferential entry to students who successfully complete a QQI course in Dungarvan College (or in another partner College of Further Education) and who also meet certain criteria.

== Notable academics ==
- Gavin O'Brien, an Irish hurler playing for Waterford, is a business teacher.

== See also ==
- Education in Ireland
- List of further education colleges in Ireland
- Waterford Institute of Technology
