= Powerscourt National School =

Powerscourt National School is a primary school in Enniskerry, Ireland. Established in 1818, it is the longest continuously run primary school in Ireland. It had a 200th anniversary celebration in 2018. Sadie Honner is principal. Footage of anguished screaming from the school has gone viral.
