= Paul Fahy =

Irish artistic director

Paul Fahy is the long-standing Artistic Director of the Galway Arts Festival. He previously managed the Kilkenny Arts Festival.

== Life ==
He is a native of County Galway, and studied Visual Arts at university.

Having previously served five years as artistic director of the Kilkenny Arts Festival, Fahy has been artistic director of the Galway Arts Festival since 2005.In 2009, he some criticism over ticket prices over several years but replied it was necessary to cover the costs of paying performers and ensuring the high quality of the festival. He has worked to reduce the environmental impact of the festival.

In 2023 he was made a Chevalier of the Ordre des Arts et des Lettres by the French Ambassador to Ireland, Vincent Guérend.
