= Youghal International College =

International school in County Cork, Ireland

Youghal International College (YIC) is an international school in Youghal, County Cork, Ireland. It serves ages 6 through 18. The Spanish Ministry of Education recognises the school, which is a branch of the Centro Afuera in Madrid.

The ministry classifies it as a "Centro Privado Español en el Extranjero".
