= Adrian Faherty =

Irish Gaelic football player

Personal information
- Native name: Adrian Ó Fatharta (Irish)
- Born: 8 May 1988 (age 38) Galway, Ireland
- Occupation: Quantity Surveyor
- Height: 1.83 m (6 ft 0 in)

Sport
- Sport: Gaelic Football
- Position: Goalkeeper
Clubs
- Years: Club
- 2005–2012 2013–2014: Claregalway; Neasden Gaels
Inter-county
- Years: County
- 2008–2012 2014: Galway; London
Inter-county titles
- Connacht titles: 1

Adrian Faherty (born 8 May 1988) is a former Gaelic football goalkeeper who played club football with Claregalway and inter-county for Galway from 2008 to 2012 and London for the 2014 season.

Faherty made his senior debut in 2008 during the league against Laois but never got his championship start until 2009 where they faced Sligo which proved a tight game but Galway got a 1–13 to 0–12 win to advance to the Connacht final.

On 19 July 2009 Galway faced (and were defeated by) Mayo. Galway faced Donegal in Round 4 of the All-Ireland qualifiers with Faherty in goal; however, Donegal ended Galway's campaign by knocking them out of the Championship.

He also played for Salthill Devon in the League of Ireland First Division.

He emigrated to London and wasn't involved with Galway for the 2013 season.
