= Connacht Railway Cup =

The Connacht Railway Cup or Midland Great Western Railway Cup was a Gaelic football competition organised by the Connacht GAA. Participants were the five county teams.

There is a record of a match in this competition being played between Mayo and Roscommon on October 26, 1913.

The Connacht Railway Cup was an entirely different competition to the Interprovincial Championship which had the same name.

== Roll of honour ==
Key to list of winners
*	Final won after Replay
†	Final not played

Year	Date	Winner	Opponent	Venue	Note
1919	1 November 1919	Mayo 1-4	Galway 0-1	Castlerea	
1925	25 October 1925	Sligo 5-2	Roscommon 0-2	Tubbercurry, Sligo	Qualified for the Knockout Phase of the 1925–26 NFL
