= Sligo Grammar School =

Location
- Sligo, County Sligo; Ireland
- Coordinates: 54.2729°N 8.4637°W

Information
- Type: Secondary School
- Religious affiliation: Church of Ireland
- Headmaster: Michael Hall
- Gender: Mixed
- Age: 11 to 18
- Enrolment: 450 (2019)
- Colours: White & Navy
- Sports: Rugby, hockey, basketball, kayaking
- Website: sligogrammarschool.org

Sligo Grammar School is a private fee-paying co-educational boarding school located on The Mall in Sligo. The school has approximately 450 students of which approximately 100 are boarders. It offers the traditional Junior Certificate and Leaving Certificate courses along with Transition Year, which is compulsory. It is under Church of Ireland management.

== History ==
The school has existed in various forms for over 400 years, its constitutions reflecting the changing outlook and needs for society. The present school incorporates part of the Charter School which was set up in 1752 under a Royal Charter, and which closed in 1843. The Diocesan School In Elphin, which numbered Oliver Goldsmith among its pupils, was moved to Charter School buildings in Sligo in 1862. In 1907, the school buildings were conveyed to the Incorporated Society who closed their boarding school at Primrose Grange under Knocknarea and built dormitories and classrooms (the present boy’s dormitories and "Prep Room") on the present site, of Sligo Grammar School. In 1947, Sligo Grammar School was merged with Sligo High School which was founded by Dean Ardill in 1911. The premises of the High School were closed and the residence known as the "Hermitage", adjoining the Grammar School, was purchased from the Campbell family to house the girl boarders. A new teaching block was added in 1971, and expanded in 1985 and 2002. In August 1976, the school was leased by the Incorporated Society to Sligo Grammar School Limited, which runs the school through a local Protestant board. "The Hermitage" was destroyed by fire in November 1976 and was replaced by a new residence in September 1978. An extension to the school, including more classrooms and a new library, was completed in September 2012.

== Extracurricular ==
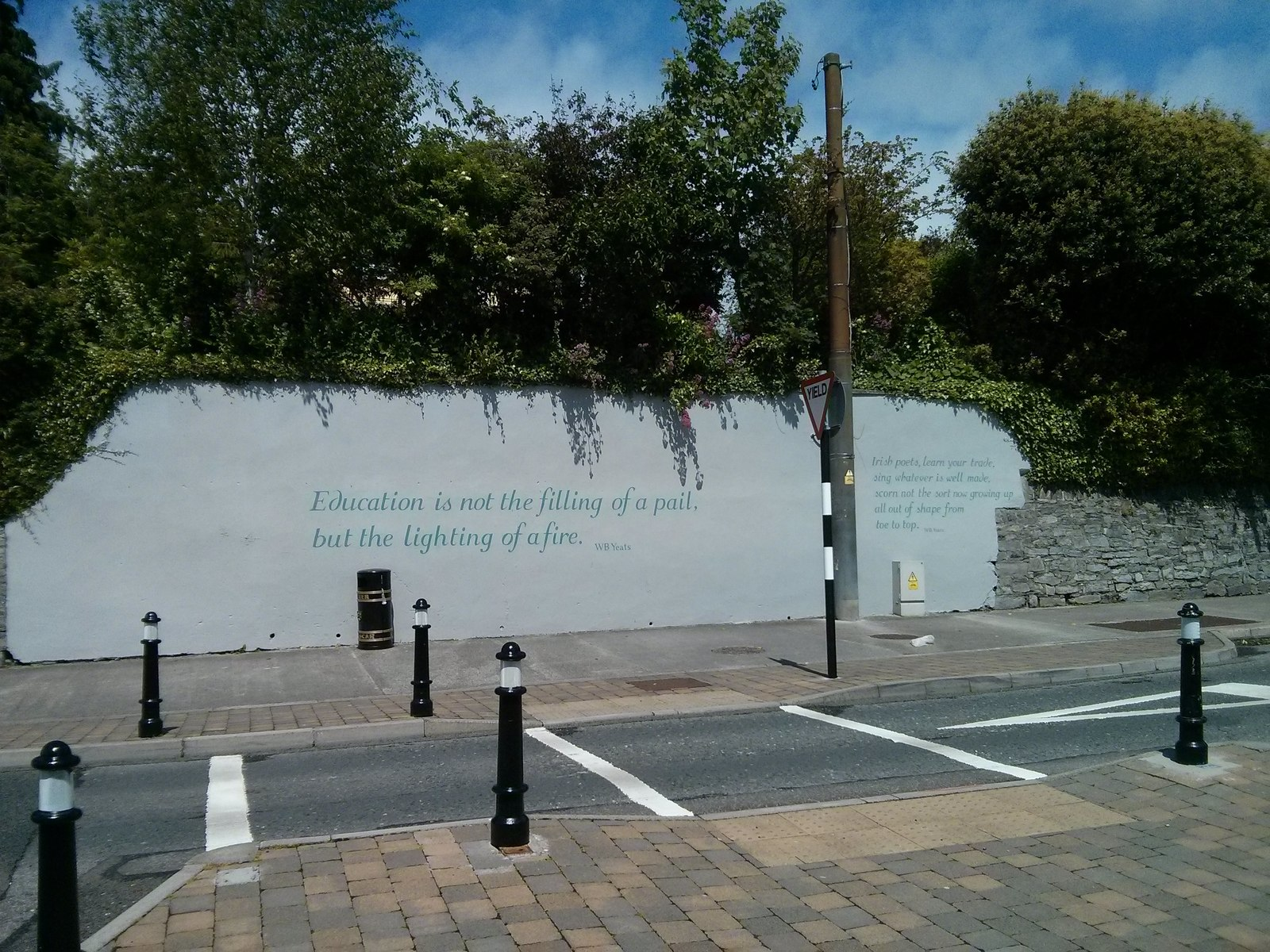
Mural on wall near Sligo Grammar School

Sligo Grammar School have won the Connacht Schools Rugby Senior Cup 13 times, winning three consecutive titles in 2022, 2023, and 2024. The school also had a successful period, under the coaching of teacher Oliver Morris, in the 1999 and 2000 seasons. The school also has an athletics association and hockey teams for girls. There are also competitive debating teams in English, Irish and German. The school also has an SATB choir.

== Notable past pupils ==
- Oliver Goldsmith (1728-1774) - student of Elphin Diocesan School, which later became part of the Grammar School.
- Jack B. Yeats (1871-1957) - artist
- R. M. Smyllie (1893-1954) - former editor of The Irish Times
- Frank Wynne (b. 1962) - Irish literary translator and writer
- Cathal Sheridan (b. 1988) - Munster Rugby player
