= St Joseph's Patrician College =

Secondary school in Galway, Ireland

Coordinates: 53.27256°N 9.05794°W

St. Joseph's Patrician College
- The Bish
- Nun's Island, Galway, Ireland

Information
- Type: Secondary school
- Motto: Love God, Work Hard and Take Care of One Another
- Established: 1862
- Principal: Sarah Gleeson
- Colours: Blue and White
- Affiliation: Catholic
- Website: www.bish.ie

St. Joseph's Patrician College, often known as "The Bish", is a secondary school on Nun's Island, in Galway, West of Ireland. Founded by the Patrician Brothers, a religious order, it has approximately 800 students on roll and, in recent years, has had success in a wide range of sporting activities including soccer, rugby, basketball, rowing, Gaelic games, athletics, and table tennis.

== History ==
Patrician brother Paul O'Connor, opened the school on Nun's Island at the request of Bishop John McEvilly in 1862. This association with the Bishop led to the school's "Bish" nickname. The "St. Joseph's College" name arose when the connotations of the term "seminary" shifted from "school" to "school for religious orders".

The main entrance of the school

A national school was added in 1899.

== Extra curricular activities ==
=== Drama ===
Plays and talent shows are often performed annually by the students of St. Joseph's Patrician College.

=== Rowing ===
St Joseph's College Rowing Club was established in 1932, making its first competitive appearance against St. Patrick's Boat Club later that year in the Schoolboy Fours. It did not acquire its own boathouse until 1955, when the Menlo Emmet's donated their Woodquay premises to the school under the agreement it should never be used for anything but the development of rowing. The club was a dominant player in the Junior National Championships which had been established in 1964, and has won a number of national championships in various grades.

Internationally, oarsmen from St. Joseph's College R.C. have also excelled, as a club competing at The British School Regatta, Ghent International Regatta, Henley Royal Regatta, and the Sydney International Rowing Regatta in March 2013. Some have represented Ireland on the international stage at all levels of competition from the Home International Regatta (Ireland, England, Scotland and Wales), to the Coupe de la Jeunesse (second level European Junior Championship) and the World Junior Championship. Alumni of the school have achieved even higher laurels following on from their experience gained on the Corrib, competing at the World U-23 Championships, World Senior Championships and the Olympic Games.

=== Rugby ===
In rugby, teams from the school have won 10 Connacht Schools Junior Cups (last in 1991) and 12 Connacht Schools Senior Cups (last in 1994).

Other titles include the U-14 Connacht Schools League (2010, 2012 2013, 2024), Junior Schools Connacht League (2010), Junior Schools City Cup (2012, 2013), Senior Schools Development Cup (2010, 2012. 2023), and U-17 Connacht Schools 7's (2012, 2013).

The Bish has been successful in producing quality rugby teams and players since the school was founded. A number of players have represented played on representative teams provincially and nationally, at both under-age and senior level. Among these are Damian Browne, Andrew Browne, Dylan Tierney-Martin and Darragh Leader, all of whom have played at senior level for local professional side Connacht Rugby. The Bish currently fields teams at all school age levels - Under 14, Junior and Senior. The U-14's compete in the Connacht U-14 Schools League, the Juniors partake in the Connacht Junior League, Junior Cup and City Cup and the Senior Team play in the U-18 Connacht Regional League as well as the Connacht Senior Cup.

=== Basketball ===
Basketball is also played.

== Notable alumni ==
Politics

- Michael Colivet (29 March 1882 – 4 May 1955) was a Sinn Féin politician. He was elected TD for Limerick City, a founding member of the Irish Republic, and elected to the First Dail.
- Séamus Brennan, (1948–2008) Fianna Fáil politician, Teachta Dála and minister of various portfolios, most notably Transport where he oversaw the introduction of the penalty point system.

Sport

- John Maher, Galway player and All Star Midfielder
- Dylan Tierney-Martin, rugby player for Connacht
- Andrew Browne, Connacht rugby player
- Damian Browne, Oyonnax rugby player
- David Collins, Galway hurler and former Young Hurler of The Year
- Adrian Faherty, Galway Gaelic footballer
- Ger Farragher, former Galway hurler
- David Forde, Millwall and Republic of Ireland footballer
- Ciaran Gaffney, Zebre rugby player
- Colin Hawkins, Shamrock Rovers Assistant Manager
- Darragh Leader, Connacht rugby player
- Tadhg Leader, rugby player
- Eamonn McGuire, rugby player for Connacht and Ireland
- Neville Maxwell, Olympic rower
- John Russell, Sligo Rovers footballer
- Ollie Horgan, Galway United Assistant Manager

Entertainment

- Brian McManus, YouTuber
