= Coláiste Bhaile Chláir =

School in County Galway, Ireland

- Claregalway College

Location
- Lakeview, Claregalway, County Galway; Ireland; 53.3369°N 8.9389°W

Information
- Motto: "Together We Will Achieve"
- Religious affiliation: Multidenominational
- Established: 2013
- Principal: Alan Mongey
- Patron: GRETB
- Enrollment: 1,174 (2021)
- Website: colaistebhailechlair.com

Coláiste Bhaile Chláir is an Irish co-educational and multidenominational community college situated in Lakeview, Claregalway, County Galway. It is under the patronage of the Galway and Roscommon Education and Training Board (GRETB).

It is a Microsoft "showcase school", having been recognised by the company as a "global leader in successful integrations of technology with teaching and learning".

== History and development ==
Coláiste Bhaile Chláir was founded on 2 September 2013.

Alan Mongey is the principal of the school, a former president of the National Association of Principals and Deputy Principals (NAPD). Cyril Donnellan, Emma Ryan and Lisa Carty are deputy principals. Donnellan is a former hurler with the Galway senior team.

Construction work began in early 2016 on a 23-classroom extension to Coláiste Bhaile Chláir. In July 2018, further plans to extend the school and also provide a purpose-built Educate Together national school in the area received the green light from An Bord Pleanála. In late 2018, the €5.4 million extension project to develop a new two storey extension to Coláiste Bhaile Chláir, including a two classroom special needs unit and sports hall, began. It was completed in July 2020.

== Curriculum ==
The school offers both the Junior and Leaving Certificate cycles and a Transition Year cycle. Coláiste Bhaile Chláir offers all the mandatory subjects, along with woodwork, metalwork, home economics, technical graphics, business studies, design & communication, music and modern foreign languages.

Coláiste Bhaile Chláir is involved in a variety of sports, including Gaelic football, camogie, hurling, soccer, basketball, badminton and golf.

== Notable staff ==
- Cyril Donnellan – the former hurler with the Galway senior team is the current deputy principal
- Damien Comer – the Galway Gaelic footballer teaches science and maths
- Paul Conroy – the Galway Gaelic footballer teaches Irish and business
- Fiontán Ó Curraoin – Galway Gaelic footballer
- Maurice Sheridan – former Galway Gaelic footballer
- James Regan – hurler with the Galway senior team since 2011
- Lorraine Ryan – 2013 All-Ireland winning Galway camogie captain
