= Athlone Community College =

- Coláiste Pobail Átha Luain

Location
- Retreat Road, Athlone; Ireland
- Coordinates: 53.4247°N 7.9202°W

Information
- Motto: "Even while we teach, we learn"
- Established: 1974
- Educational authority: Longford Westmeath Education Training Board
- Principal: Lisa O'Kennedy
- Gender: Mixed
- Enrollment: 1,174 (2023)
- Language: English
- Colours: Blue and yellow
- Website: athlonecc.ie

Athlone Community College is a mixed gender school in the town of Athlone in the Irish Midlands under the patronage of the Longford and Westmeath Education and Training Board (LWETB). It consists of a student body of over 1,100 students and employs more than 120 teachers.

== History ==
In 1902, a Technical School for boys was opened by the Secretary of the Department of Education and Technical Instruction. The Old Vocational School on Northgate Street moved to the Retreat Road site in 1974, when Athlone Community College was built to cater for 500 students.

In 2008, the Department of Education and Science gave approval for the building of a new school in place of the existing building. The school was completed in 2014 and opened by the then Taoiseach Enda Kenny in 2017.

In May 2024, the school announced the retirement of principal Eileen Donohoe after 47 years of teaching in Athlone Community College. In a post on social media, the school praised Donohoe's "dedication, passion and unwavering commitment". Donohoe was succeeded by Lisa O'Kennedy.

== Curriculum ==
The school offers both the Junior and Leaving Certificate cycles, as well as Transition Year.

Athlone Community College is involved in a variety of sports, including Gaelic football, soccer and rugby. It is also involved in debating, having won three All-Ireland Concern Debating titles and two All-Ireland Gael Linn Irish debating titles.

== Alumni ==
- Donal Shine (b. 1989) - Gaelic footballer
