= Marist College, Athlone =

Location
- Athlone, County Westmeath; Ireland; 53.425°N 7.925°W

Information
- Religious affiliation: Roman Catholic
- Established: 1884
- Founders: Marist Brothers
- Principal: Michael Dermody
- Enrollment: 540 (2023)
- Colours: Blue and yellow
- Website: www.maristathlone.net

Marist College is a secondary school for boys in Athlone, County Westmeath, Ireland.

== History and development ==
The school was founded in 1884 by the Marist Brothers, a French Order, and the first principal was Brother Mungo. The original school was based in Glesson Street/Saint Mary's Square. The college had a seminary for Juniorate training between 1915 and 1936 located at Bailieborough Castle, County Cavan. In 1973, the school moved to its current location on Retreat Road.

In January 2022, the Department of Education gave the go-ahead for a new school building to be developed at the college. Speaking to the Westmeath Independent, principal Michael Dermody said this was an important milestone in the history of the school.

== Curriculum ==
The school offers both the Junior and Leaving Certificate cycles. Transition Year was introduced into the college in 1989. Marist College offers all the mandatory subjects, along with technical graphics, business studies, technology and design & communication.

Marist College is involved in a variety of sports, including Gaelic football, hurling, soccer, rugby, basketball and golf. It is also involved in the F1 in Schools competition, with six previous teams reaching the world finals. The schools most successful team, Catalyst Racing, hold the Irish and UK fastest track time record, achieved during the 2022 National Finals. Catalyst Racing went on to come 5th at the F1 in Schools World Finals 2023

== Notable past pupils ==
- Robbie Benson – footballer for St Patrick's Athletic
- Jack Carty – rugby union player
- Robbie Henshaw – rugby union player for Ireland
- Ralph Kenna – Professor of theoretical physics Coventry University
- Anthony Kelly - Cambridge scientist, government advisor and Professor of Education at the University of Southampton. Fellow of the Institute of Physics, the Institute of Mathematics and its Applications, and the Academy of Social Science. Leaving Cert class of 1975. * Profile at southampton.ac.uk
- Brian Lenihan – former Minister for Foreign Affairs and Tánaiste
- John McCormack – tenor
- Hugh Milling – cricketer
- Feargal O'Rourke – Managing Partner of PwC Ireland, architect of the double Irish tax scheme
- Mark Rohan – Paralympic gold medal winner for Ireland
- Fergal Wilson – Retired GAA player for Tubberclaire GAA & Westmeath GAA
