= Sancta Maria College, Louisburgh =

Location
- Louisburgh, County Mayo; Ireland; 53.76451°N 9.80524°W

Information
- Established: 1919
- Principal: Pauline Moran
- Enrollment: 450 (As of 2019)
- Website: www.sanctamaria.ie

Sancta Maria College is a Catholic secondary school located in Louisburgh, County Mayo, Ireland. The school was Ireland's first Catholic co-educational secondary school.

== History ==
In 1919, two Sisters of Mercy arrived in Louisburgh, and began the development of what would become the first Catholic co-educational secondary school in Ireland. The school was originally called Holy Rosary Secondary School, but more familiarly known as ‘The Convent’. When the school first opened there were only twenty pupils who had to pay a fee of £9 per student per school year.

The school was extended several times during the 20th century, with significant works undertaken in the 1980s. By the early 21st century, the school was operated under the trusteeship of Catholic Education an Irish Schools Trust (CEIST).

In 2008, the school was ranked 15 (out of 28) in Mayo for third level attendance with 77% progressing to third level. The majority of students (27.5%) enrolled in NUI Galway.

In 2017, the school underwent an extension project which cost €7 million. The project continued for 20 months and included the construction of a new 2-storey extension comprising new main entrance, 12 specialist classrooms, general purpose/dining room and a kitchenette.
