= List of Catholic schools in Ireland by religious order =

This is a list of primary and secondary schools in the island of Ireland that operate under the ethos of the Roman Catholic Church, classified by the religious order to which they belong.

== Augustinian Order ==
- Good Counsel College - New Ross
- St. Augustine's College - Dungarvan

== Benedictine Order ==
- Glenstal Abbey School - Murroe

== Carmelite Order ==
- Terenure College - Terenure, Dublin

== Christian Brothers ==
- The Abbey - Tipperary
- Ardscoil Rís - Dublin
- Ardscoil Rís - Limerick
- Christian Brothers College - Cork
- Christian Brothers College - Kilkenny
- Christian Brothers College - Monkstown, Dublin
- Christian Brothers High School - Clonmel
- Christian Brothers School - Charleville
- Christian Brothers School - Roscommon
- Christian Brothers School - Thurles
- Christian Brothers School Sexton Street - Limerick
- Christian Brothers Secondary School - Ennistymon
- Clonkeen College - Deansgrange, Dublin
- Coláiste Éanna - Ballyroan, Dublin
- Coláiste Eoin - Booterstown, Dublin
- Coláiste Mhuire - Mullingar
- Coláiste Phádraig - Lucan, Dublin
- Coláiste Rís - Dundalk
- Dingle Christian Brothers School - Dingle
- Drimnagh Castle Secondary School - Drimnagh, Dublin
- Dungarvan Christian Brothers School - Dungarvan
- Midleton Christian Brothers Secondary School - Midleton
- Mount Sion Primary School - Waterford
- Naas Christian Brothers School - Naas
- Oatlands College - Mount Merrion, Dublin
- O'Connell School - Dublin
- Rice College - Ennis
- St. Aidan's Christian Brothers School - Dublin
- St. Joseph's Christian Brothers School - Fairview, Dublin
- St. Joseph's Christian Brothers School - Nenagh
- St Mary's Christian Brothers School - Tralee
- St. Vincent's Secondary School - Glasnevin, Dublin
- Synge Street Christian Brothers School - Dublin
- Waterpark College - Waterford
- Woodbrook College - Bray

=== Northern Ireland ===
- Abbey Christian Brothers' Grammar School - Newry
- Christian Brothers Grammar School - Omagh
- Edmund Rice College - Glengormley
- St Mary's Christian Brothers' Grammar School - Belfast

== Cistercian Order ==
- Cistercian College - Roscrea

== De La Salle Brothers ==
- Ardscoil La Salle - Raheny, Dublin
- De La Salle College - Ballyshannon
- De La Salle College - Churchtown, Dublin
- De La Salle College - Dundalk
- De La Salle College - Waterford
- St Benildus College - Kilmacud, Dublin
- St. Gerald's College - Castlebar

== Dominican Order ==
- Dominican College Sion Hill - Blackrock, Dublin
- Muckross Park College - Dublin
- Newbridge College - Newbridge

=== Northern Ireland ===
- Dominican College, Fortwilliam - Belfast
- Dominican College - Portstewart
- St Dominic's Grammar School for Girls - Belfast

== Faithful Companions of Jesus ==
- FCJ Secondary School - Bunclody, County Wexford
- Laurel Hill Coláiste - Limerick

== Franciscan Order ==
- Gormanston College - Gormanston
- St Francis College - Rochestown, Cork

== Holy Faith Sisters ==
- St. David's Holy Faith Secondary School - Greystones

== Holy Ghost Fathers ==
- Blackrock College - Blackrock, Dublin
- Rockwell College - Cashel
- St Mary's College - Rathmines, Dublin
- St Michael's College - Dublin
- Templeogue College - Templeogue, Dublin

== Marist Brothers ==
- Marist College - Athlone
- Marian College - Ballsbridge, Dublin
- Moyle Park College - Clondalkin, Dublin

== Marist Fathers ==
- Catholic University School - Leeson Street, Dublin
- Chanel College - Coolock, Dublin
- St Mary's College - Dundalk, County Louth

== Order of Saint Ursula ==
- Ursuline College, Sligo

== Patrician Brothers ==
- Patrician Secondary School - Newbridge
- St Joseph's Patrician College - Nun's Island, Galway

== Poor Servants of the Mother of God ==
- Manor House School - Raheny, Dublin

== Presentation Brothers ==
- Coláiste an Spioraid Naoimh - Bishopstown, Cork
- Coláiste Chríost Rí - Turners Cross, Cork
- Presentation College - Bray
- Presentation Brothers College - Cork

== Presentation Sisters ==
- Calasanctius College - Oranmore
- Our Lady's College - Drogheda
- Presentation College - Headford
- Presentation Secondary School - Clonmel
- Presentation Secondary School - Kilkenny
- Scoil Mhuire - Clane

== Salesians of Don Bosco ==
- Salesian Secondary College (formerly Copsewood College) - Pallaskenry
- Salesian College - Celbridge

== Sisters of Loreto ==
- Loreto Abbey - Dalkey
- Loreto College - Coleraine
- Loreto College - Foxrock, Dublin
- Loreto College - Mullingar
- Loreto College, St Stephen's Green - Dublin
- Loreto College - Swords, Dublin
- Loreto High School Beaufort - Rathfarnham, Dublin
- Loreto Secondary School - Kilkenny
- Loreto Secondary School - Navan

=== Northern Ireland ===
- Loreto Grammar School - Omagh

== Sisters of Mercy ==
- Coláiste Bríde - Enniscorthy
- Coláiste Íosagáin - Booterstown, Dublin
- Mercy College - Coolock, Dublin
- Mercy College - Sligo
- Mercy Secondary School, Mounthawk - Tralee
- Mount Mercy College - Bishopstown
- Mount St. Michael Secondary School - Claremorris
- Our Lady's Secondary School - Templemore
- St. Joseph's Secondary School - Castlebar
- St. Joseph's Secondary School - Navan
- St. Joseph's Secondary School - Rush
- St. Joseph's Secondary School - Tulla
- St. Leo's College - Carlow
- St. Raphael's College - Loughrea
- Sancta Maria College, Louisburgh
- Sancta Maria College - Rathfarnham, Dublin
- Scoil Mhuire - Buncrana
- Scoil Mhuire - Longford

=== Northern Ireland ===
- Mount Lourdes Grammar School - Enniskillen
- Our Lady's Grammar School - Newry
- Thornhill College - Derry

== Society of Jesus ==
- Belvedere College - Dublin
- Clongowes Wood College - Clane
- Coláiste Iognáid - Galway
- Crescent College - Limerick
- Gonzaga College - Ranelagh, Dublin
- St Declan's School - Dublin

== Society of the Sacred Heart ==
- Mount Anville School - Dundrum, Dublin

== Vincentian Fathers ==
- Castleknock College - Castleknock, Dublin
- St. Paul's College - Raheny, Dublin

=== Northern Ireland ===
- St Louise's Comprehensive College - Belfast

== Unaffiliated Diocesan Schools ==
- Clonfert College, Ballinasloe
- Coole National School - Summerhill, County Meath
- Presentation College, Athenry
- St. Patrick's Classical School - Navan
- St. Flannan's College - Ennis
- Garbally College - Ballinasloe
- St. Brendan's - Killarney
- St Michael's College - Listowel
- St. Colman's College - Fermoy
- St Eunan's College - Letterkenny
- St. Finian's College - Mullingar
- St Jarlath's College - Tuam
- St Kieran's College - Kilkenny
- St Macartan's College - Monaghan
- St. Mary's College - Galway
- St. Mary's Knockbeg College - Carlow
- St Munchin's College - Limerick
- St Muredach's College - Ballina
- St Peter's College - Wexford
- Summerhill College - Sligo

== See also ==
- List of schools in the Republic of Ireland
- List of fee-paying schools in Ireland
