= Catholic Education an Irish Schools Trust =

Irish education organisation

CEIST - Catholic Education, an Irish Schools Trust
- Industry: Education
- Founded: 2007
- Headquarters: Summit House, Embassy Office Park, Kill, Naas, County Kildare, W91 VKOT, Ireland
- Number of locations: 107 (2019)
- Area served: Republic of Ireland
- Key people: Gerry McGuill (CEO)
- Website: www.ceist.ie

Catholic Education, an Irish Schools Trust (CEIST) is the trustee body for 107 Catholic Voluntary Secondary Schools in Ireland. CEIST provides the moral and legal framework that enable its schools to offer second level Catholic education in Ireland. Its role is built on the vision of its five founding congregations Daughters of Charity, Presentation Sisters, Sisters of the Christian Retreat, Sisters of Mercy and Missionaries of the Sacred Heart. These religious congregations established CEIST in 2007 to ensure the viability of Catholic Education at post-primary level in Ireland into the future.

At the same time, the congregations also entered into another collaborative arrangement, to be known as the EDUCENA Foundation. EDUCENA operates with a twofold mission: upholding the distinct Catholic character of their schools and overseeing the management of entrusted properties meant for the advancement of Catholic education's mission and stability.

== Organisation ==
CEIST CLG was incorporated in May 2007. The religious congregations appointed 16 CEIST members - 11 religious and five lay. The board of directors has 12 members - three religious and nine lay.

Day-to-day management remains the responsibility of each school's management, in accord with the Education Act 1998. The schools are supported by the trustees from the central office.

It currently oversees approximately 58,000 students and 4,000 teachers and administrative staff. Currently, one in six second level students in Ireland attends a CEIST secondary school.

== Background ==
The origins of CEIST lie in the five Catholic Religious Congregations, with a history of over 350 years in post-primary education. Nonetheless, the challenges of the 21st century prompted the need for innovative frameworks, guaranteeing the relevance of Catholic secondary education as a viable option in today's diverse Ireland.

On that basis, provincial leaders of the five Religious Congregations signed the Charter of a new education organisation to be known as CEIST, an acronym for Catholic Education, an Irish Schools Trust. The Trust was officially established on 1 February 2007.

== Education ==
The 107 CEIST schools are well distributed across the whole island of Ireland. CEIST schools are Catholic voluntary secondary schools and are inclusive schools, welcoming those of all faiths and none. Students in CEIST secondary schools^{[9]} follow Ireland’s Department of Education Curriculum. The schools provide students with an opportunity to grow and prepare for adult life and pay special attention to the intellectual, emotional, moral, and spiritual development of every single student. CEIST schools integrate faith formation into their educational programs in the context of a modern, pluralist society. Students are provided with opportunities to deepen their understanding of religion, participate in prayer services and liturgical celebrations, and engage in spiritual reflection and growth.

== Schools ==
Carlow
- Presentation College, Carlow
- Presentation De La Salle College, Bagenalstown
- St Leo's College, Carlow

Clare

- Mary Immaculate Secondary School, Lisdoonvarna
- Scoil Mhuire, Ennistymon
- St. Joseph’s Secondary School, Spanish Point
- St Joseph's Secondary School, Tulla

Cork

- Christ King Girls’ Secondary School, Cork
- Coláiste an Chroí Naofa, Carraig na bhFear
- Coláiste Muire, Crosshaven
- Coláiste na Toirbhirte, Bandon
- Mercy Secondary School, Kanturk
- Mount Mercy College, Cork
- Mount St Michael Secondary School, Rosscarbery
- North Presentation Secondary School, Farranree
- Presentation Secondary School, Ballyphehane
- Presentation Secondary School, Mitchelstown
- Sacred Heart Secondary School, Clonakilty
- St. Aloysius School, Cork
- St. Mary's High School, Midleton
- St Mary's Secondary School, Charleville
- St. Mary's Secondary School, Macroom
- St. Mary's Secondary School, Mallow

Donegal

- Scoil Mhuire, Buncrana
- St. Columba’s College, Stranorlar

Dublin

- Caritas College, Ballyfermot
- Coláiste Bríde, Clondalkin
- Mercy College, Coolock
- Mercy Secondary School, Inchicore
- Our Lady Of Mercy College, Beaumont
- Our Lady of Mercy Secondary School, Drimnagh
- Presentation Secondary School, Blackrock
- Presentation Secondary School, Warrenmount
- Sancta Maria College, Rathfarnham
- St. Joseph’s College, Lucan
- St. Joseph's Secondary School, Rush

Galway

- Ardscoil Mhuire, Ballinasloe
- Calasanctius College, Oranmore
- Clonfert College, Ballinasloe
- Coláiste Chroí Mhuire gan Smal, An Spidéal
- Holy Rosary College, Mountbellew
- Mercy College, Woodford
- Our Lady’s College, Galway
- Presentation College, Athenry
- Presentation College, Currylea, Tuam
- Presentation College Headford
- Scoil Bhríde, Tuam
- St. Paul’s Secondary School, Oughterard
- St. Raphael’s College, Loughrea

Kerry

- Mercy Secondary School, Mounthawk, Tralee
- Presentation Secondary School, Castleisland
- Presentation Secondary School, Listowel
- Presentation Secondary School, Milltown
- Presentation Secondary School, Tralee
- St. Brigid’s Secondary School, Killarney
- St. Joseph’s Secondary School, Ballybunion

Kildare

- Ardscoil na Tríonóide, Athy
- Coláiste Naomh Mhuire, Naas
- Scoil Dara, Kilcock

Kilkenny

- Presentation Secondary School, Kilkenny
- St. Brigid’s College, Callan

Laois

- Coláiste Íosagáin, Portarlington
- Scoil Chríost Rí, Portlaoise

Limerick

- Ardscoil Mhuire, Corbally
- Coláiste Nano Nagle, Sexton Street
- Scoil na Tríonóide Naofa, Doon

Longford

- Cnoc Mhuire, Granard
- Meán Scoil Mhuire, Longford
- Mercy Secondary School, Ballymahon

Louth

- Our Lady's College, Greenhills, Drogheda
- Sacred Heart Secondary School, Drogheda
- St. Vincent’s Secondary School, Dundalk

Mayo

- Mount St. Michaels Secondary School, Claremorris
- Our Lady’s Secondary School, Belmullet
- Sacred Heart School, Westport
- Sancta Maria College, Louisburgh
- Scoil Muire agus Pádraig, Swinford
- St Joseph's Secondary School, Castlebar
- St. Mary’s Secondary School, Ballina

Meath

- Eureka Secondary School, Kells
- Scoil Mhuire, Trim
- St Joseph's Secondary School, Navan

Monaghan

- Our Lady’s Secondary School, Castleblayney

Offaly

- Killina Presentation Secondary School, Tullamore
- Sacred Heart Secondary School, Tullamore

Roscommon

- Meánscoil Muire gan Smál, Convent of Mercy, Roscommon
- Scoil Mhuire, Strokestown

Sligo

- Coláiste Muire, Ballymote
- Mercy College, Sligo
- St. Mary’s College, Ballysadare

Tipperary

- Our Lady's Secondary School, Templemore
- Presentation Secondary School, Ballingarry
- Presentation Secondary School, Clonmel
- Presentation Secondary School, Thurles
- Scoil Mhuire, Carrick-on-Suir
- St. Anne’s Secondary School, Tipperary Town
- St. Mary’s Secondary School, Nenagh
- St. Mary’s Secondary School, Newport

Waterford

- Ard Scoil na nDéise, Dungarvan
- Our Lady of Mercy Secondary School, Waterford
- Presentation Secondary School, Waterford

Wexford

- Coláiste Bríde, Enniscorthy
- Presentation Secondary School, Wexford
- St. Marys Secondary School, New Ross

Wicklow

- St. Mary’s College, Arklow

== Assessment ==
A recent review of its development over the past ten years identified certain strengths and weaknesses. There continues to be debate about state-sponsored denominational education in Ireland.

== See also ==
- Denominational education in the Republic of Ireland
