= Castlebar railway station =

Railway station in County Mayo, Ireland

Castlebar Caisleán an Bharraigh
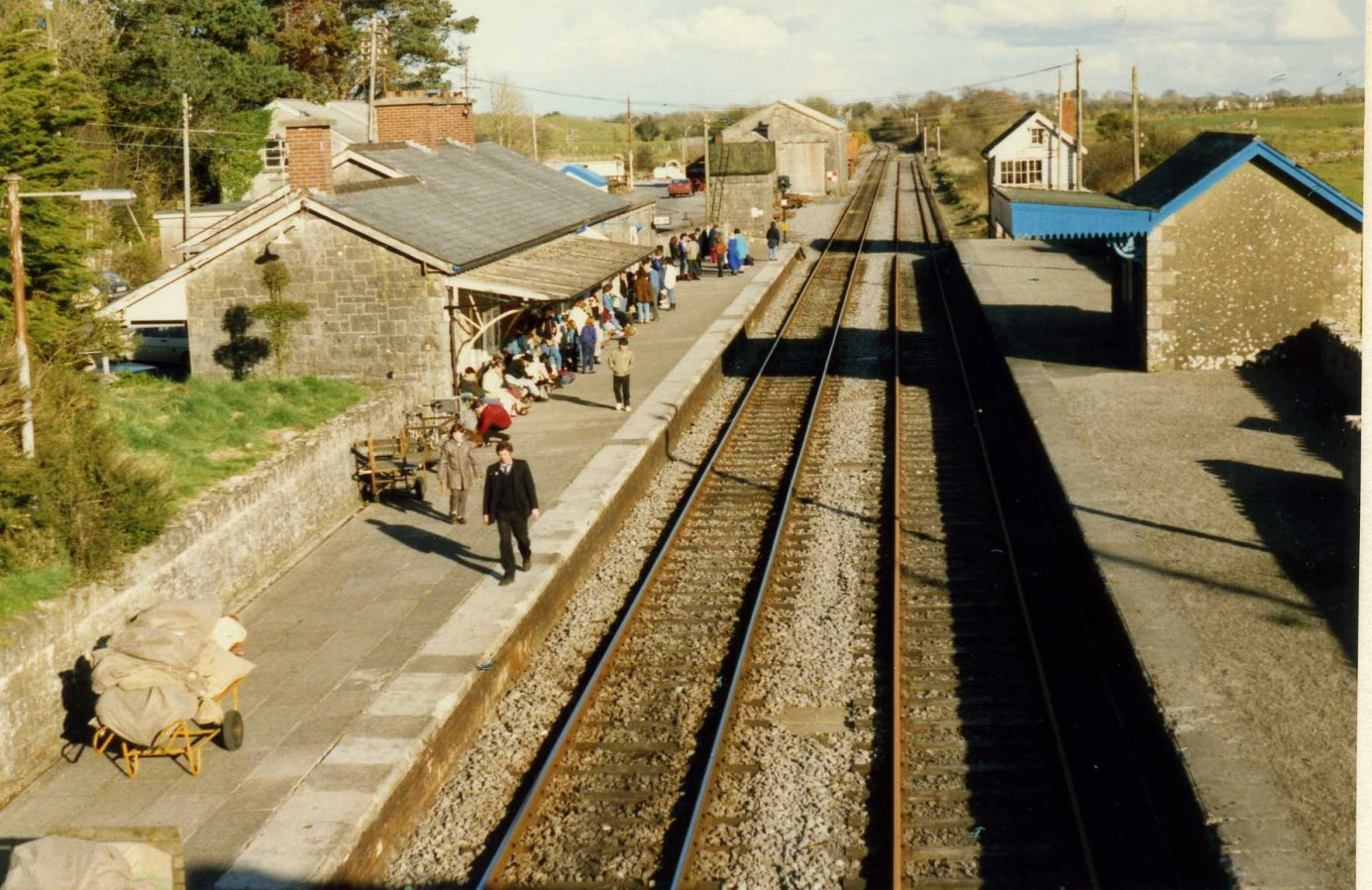
- Castlebar railway station pictured in 1989

General information
- Location: Station Road, Castlebar, County Mayo, F23 R670; Republic of Ireland
- Coordinates: 53.8473758°N 9.2881417°W
- Owner: Iarnród Éireann
- Operator: Iarnród Éireann
- Line: Dublin–Westport/Galway
- Platforms: 2 (1 in use)
- Bus operators: TFI Local Link
- Connections: 454; 460A; 460B

Other information
- Station code: CLBAR
- Website: www.irishrail.ie/en-ie/station/castlebar

History
- Opened: 17 December 1862
Location

Castlebar railway station serves the town of Castlebar in County Mayo, Ireland.

The station is on the Dublin–Westport/Galway railway line and is the penultimate stop on the line for services towards Westport. Passengers to or from Galway will need to travel to Athlone and change trains. Passengers to or from Ballina and Foxford must travel to Manulla Junction and change trains.

== History ==
The station opened on 17 December 1862, 149 miles 74 chains (241.3 km) from Broadstone via Mullingar.

== Services ==
The typical current service pattern is:

- 5 trains per day to Dublin Heuston
- 5 trains per day to Westport

Preceding station	IÉ	Following station
Manulla Junction	InterCity; Dublin–Westport/Galway railway line	Westport
