= St Joseph's Secondary School =

St Joseph's Secondary School can refer to:

Republic of Ireland

- St Joseph's Secondary School, Spanish Point, County Clare
- St Joseph's Secondary School, Tulla, County Clare
- St Joseph's Secondary School, Castlebar, County Mayo
- St Joseph's Secondary School, Navan, County Meath

Elsewhere

- St. Joseph Secondary School (Mississauga) - Ontario, Canada
- St. Joseph's Secondary School (Cornwall, Ontario)
- Caritas St. Joseph Secondary School - Hong Kong
- Saint Joseph Higher Secondary School (Dhaka) - Bangladesh
