= Richard Chambers =

Richard Chambers may refer to:

- Richard Chambers (journalist), Irish journalist
- Richard Chambers (MP) for Winchelsea (UK Parliament constituency)
- Richard Chambers (rower), British rower
- Richard Harvey Chambers, United States federal judge
- Richard Dickinson Chambers, British chemist
- Rome Chambers (Richard Jerome Chambers), Major League Baseball pitcher
- Ricky Chambers, character in Ruby in Paradise
- Richard Chambers (police officer), Commissioner of Police in New Zealand
- Richard Chambers (rugby union), Irish international rugby union player
