= List of schools in Ireland =

List of schools in Ireland may refer to:

- List of schools in Northern Ireland
- List of schools in the Republic of Ireland

== See also ==
- List of Catholic schools in Ireland by religious order
