= Claremorris =

Town in County Mayo, Ireland

Claremorris Clár Chlainne Mhuiris
- Town
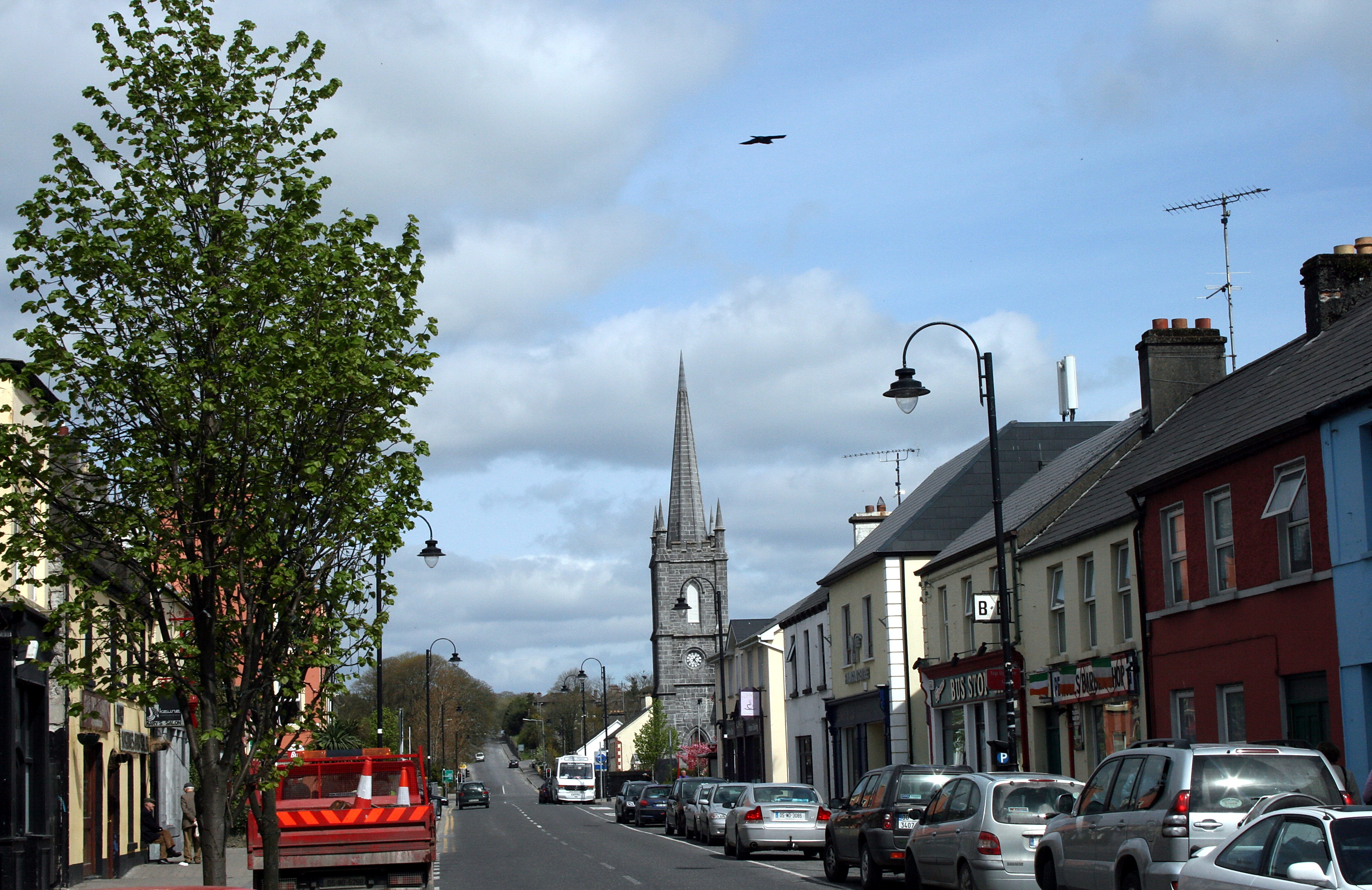
- Dalton Street in Claremorris

- Location in Ireland
- Coordinates: 53.7169°N 8.99833°W
- Country: Ireland
- Province: Connacht
- County: County Mayo
- Elevation: 69 m (226 ft)

Population (2022)
  - Total: 3,857
- Time zone: UTC±0 (WET)
  - Summer (DST): UTC+1 (IST)
- Eircode routing key: F12
- Telephone area code: +353(0)94
- Irish Grid Reference: M338751

Claremorris (/ˌkleɪrˈmɒrɪs/; Irish: Clár Chlainne Mhuiris) is a town in County Mayo in the west of Ireland, at the junction of the N17 and the N60 national routes. As of 2017, it was the fastest growing town in the county, having seen a 31% increase in population between 2006 and 2011, and a 23% increase between 2002 and 2006. Between the 2016 census and the 2022 census, the population of Claremorris grew further, from 3,687 to 3,857 inhabitants.

The town sits at the bottom of a valley, all roads leading to the town follow hills, in particular the old Knock road (known as the Knock hill) and Courthouse road. Although low-lying, the town does not experience flooding. There is no major river through the town although there are two lakes in the town centre: Clare Lough where the 'Land of the Giants' amenity is located and Mayfield Lough. A small river flows between the two.

== History ==
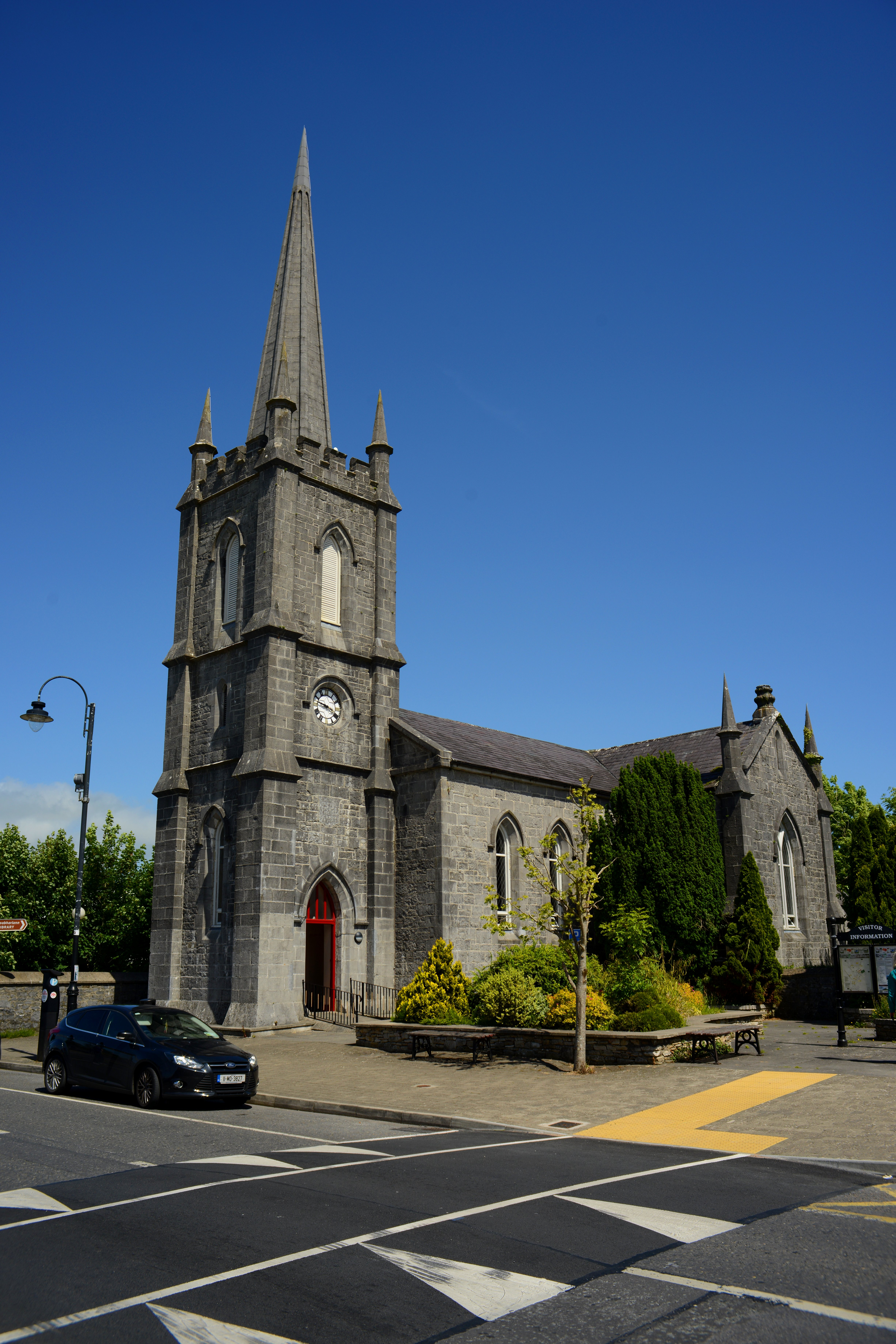
Town library

Claremorris derives its name from Maurice de Prendergast, a Norman, who came to Ireland c. 1170.

The town was established during the 18th century. In 1822, a Roman Catholic Chapel was built, which was later demolished to make way for the town hall. The present Roman Catholic church, St. Colman's Church, was built in 1911. St. John's Anglican Church, now the town library, was built in 1828.

The main landlord family in Claremorris was the Browne family, one of whom, the Hon. Denis Browne (1760–1828), was High Sheriff of Mayo during the Irish Rebellion of 1798 and acquired the nickname of "Donnchadha an Rópa" (Denis the Rope) as a result of his treatment of captured United Irishmen.

== Demographics ==
At the 2022 census, Claremorris had a total population of 3,857 people, consisting of 1,821 males and 2,036 females. Over 72% of the population were Irish nationals and Catholics constituted 65% of the population.

Genealogical records for Claremorris consist of Roman Catholic church records of marriage which commenced in 1805 and baptisms which commenced in 1825. Church of Ireland records consist of baptisms from 1834 onwards, marriages from 1846 onwards and burials from 1878 onwards. These are held at the South Mayo Family Research Centre in Ballinrobe.

Historical population
Year	Pop.	±%
1821	1,297	—
1831	1,476	+13.8%
1841	2,256	+52.8%
1851	1,560	−30.9%
1861	1,323	−15.2%
1871	1,103	−16.6%
1881	1,319	+19.6%
1891	1,259	−4.5%
1901	1,118	−11.2%
1911	1,069	−4.4%
1926	1,107	+3.6%
1936	1,132	+2.3%
1946	1,045	−7.7%
1951	1,063	+1.7%
1956	1,512	+42.2%
1961	1,519	+0.5%
1966	1,479	−2.6%
1971	1,718	+16.2%
1981	2,036	+18.5%
1986	1,992	−2.2%
1991	1,907	−4.3%
1996	1,914	+0.4%
2002	2,101	+9.8%
2006	2,595	+23.5%
2011	3,412	+31.5%
2016	3,687	+8.1%
2022	3,857	+4.6%

== Amenities ==
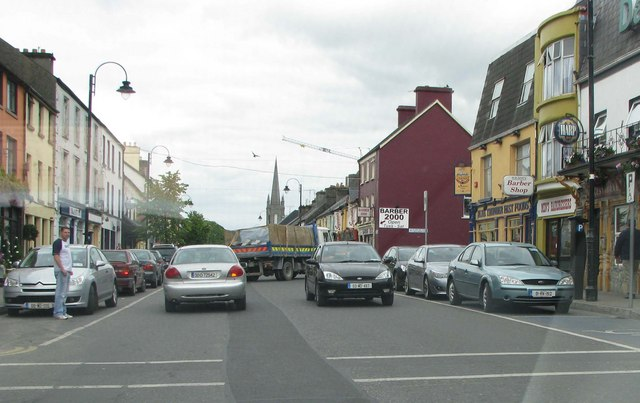
Claremorris town centre

There are two secondary schools: St. Colman's College for boys and Mount St. Michaels for girls. There are also two primary schools, Scoil Mhuire Gan Smál and Claremorris Boys National School. Gaelscoil Uileog de Búrca, in nearby Loughanamon, provides primary education through the Irish language.

A swimming pool and leisure centre opened on 1 September 2009. A Garda Síochána Station opened in 2008.

There are three hotels including the four-star McWilliam Park Hotel, which opened in 2006. The town also has several restaurants, many pubs and two nightclubs. Retail outlets in the area include several in the Silverbridge Shopping Centre, a development at the northern end of Claremorris town which is anchored by Tesco.

Local events include Claremorris Open Exhibition (an annual arts exhibition in the town held since 1978), and the Claremorris Drama Festival (an annual drama festival held since 1970).

McMahon Park - Clare Lake is located just beside the town. It has tree-lined walks, angling platforms and areas suitable for picnicking. It's also home to Land of the Giants, a children's attraction.

Claremorris has long been known by locals for its coarse fishing. There are many loughs located around Claremorris where species like Northern Pike, European Perch, European Eel, European Bream and European Roach can be caught regularly. The River Robe located outside the town has been known for its stock of wild brown trout and the Robe's tributaries are also hold a stable stock of smaller trout.

== Sports ==
There are a number of sporting clubs in the area, including Gaelic games, soccer, rugby and athletics clubs.

Claremorris GAA club has been Mayo senior hurling champions twice (1968 and 1971) and senior county Gaelic football champions four times (1961, 1964, 1965 and 1971).

The local soccer club trains and plays matches at Concannon park. There is also an athletics club which trains on a "Mondo" athletics track. A rugby club, Claremorris Colts RFC, was established in 2009 and meets at the Mount St Michael Convent Girls School pitch. The club was awarded the title of 'Club of the Year' by the Connacht Branch of the IRFU in April 2012.

A swimming club trains at the Claremorris Leisure Centre, and incorporates water polo. The club was the first from Connacht to win the all-Ireland under 16 & under 19 boys championships, as well as being the first club to win the inaugural girls under-16 and under-19 championships. The Claremorris Leisure Centre opened in 2009 and has a 25-metre, 6 lane, short course competition pool. It also has a gymnasium and fitness studio.

== Transport ==
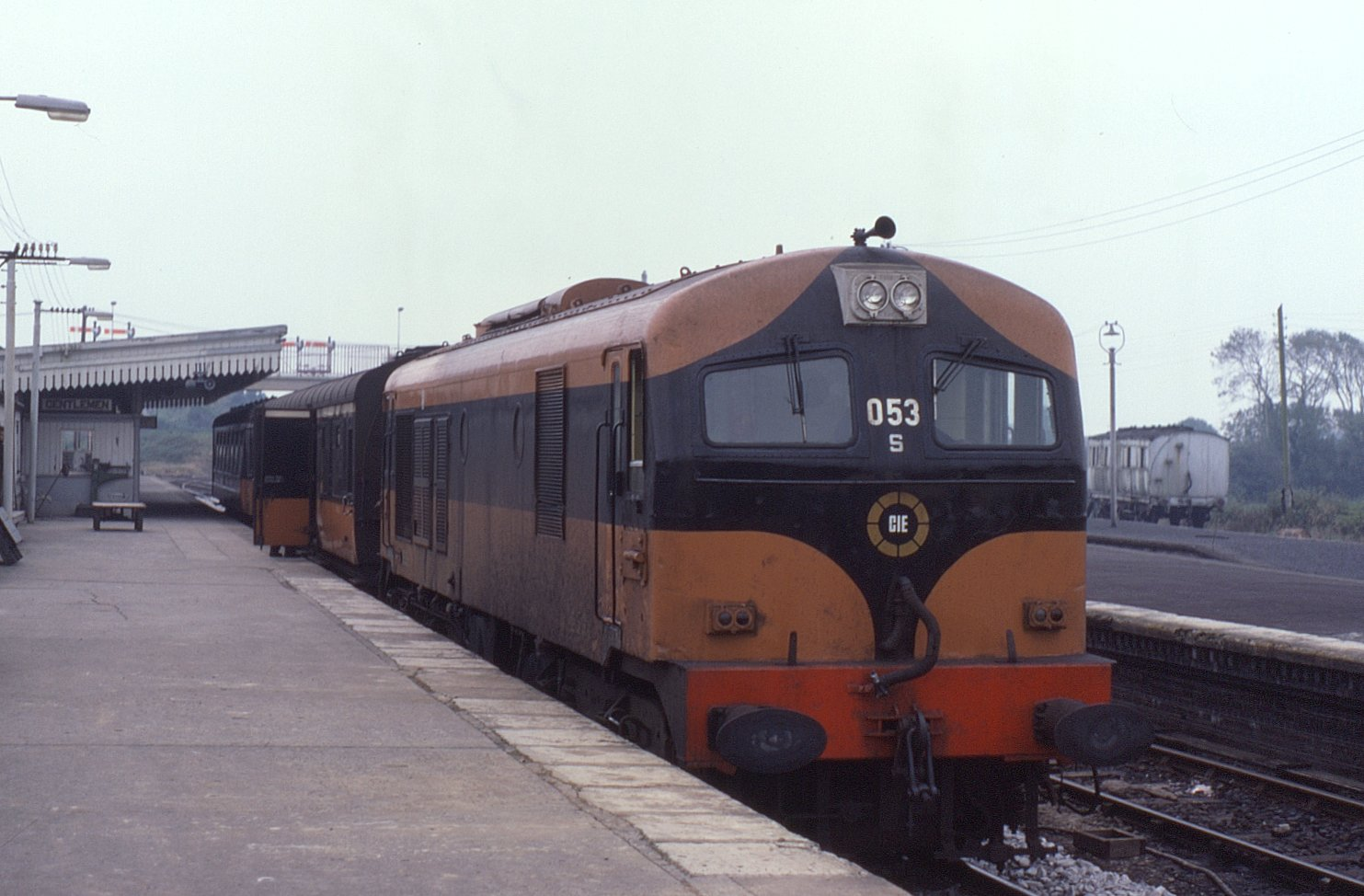
Train at Claremorris Railway Station, 1985

Map of the Western Rail Corridor; ex-GSWR line south of Limerick in green, other ex-MGWR lines are in red.

=== Road ===
Claremorris is situated at a major road junction, and the N17 (Galway-Sligo road) and the N60 (Castlebar-Roscommon road) meet in the town.

The town was once a major traffic bottleneck, with significant traffic jams every afternoon (particularly Fridays), when traffic on the N17 slowly negotiated the old bank corner which consisted of a sharp right hand bend. By the late 1990s, over 13,000 vehicles passed through the town daily. In 1994, a design for the bypass was completed by Mayo County Council. A compulsory purchase order went ahead in 1995, followed by a three-year wait for funding. Construction of the N17 Claremorris bypass commenced in 1998 and it opened in July 2001. Journey times at peak periods were reduced by 30 minutes on the Galway/Sligo route after the opening. The project was built as a grade-separated single carriageway (with motorway style interchanges). The new 16 km road bypassed one of Ireland's most treacherous national routes, as the original 11-kilometre (7 mi) stretch between Claremorris and Knock had a very high accident.

The busy N60 still passes through the town via an inner relief road. While a second bypass for the town was included in a proposed new N60 road to Castlebar, as of 2011 the National Roads Authority had suspended this development due to cutbacks.

=== Railways ===
Claremorris railway station, which opened in 1862, is served by the Dublin Galway/Westport line as well as the Ballina Branch Line to Ballina. An additional proposal, under phase 3 of the Western Railway Corridor, proposed to link Claremorris to Athenry via Tuam. However, as of December 2023, no date for this proposed development had been identified, with the "all-island strategic rail review" recommending that related works by "commenced by 2030".

== Weather station ==
Claremorris is home to one of Ireland's eight inland weather observing stations, located 2 kilometres from the town centre. It began recording weather in November 1943 and was run and staffed by a local family. During WWII, Ireland provided detailed weather reports to the Allies. Weather reports from Claremorris and Blacksod Lighthouse (located on the west coast of Mayo) played a significant factor in selecting the date of launch for the D-Day landings in June 1944. In 1949, it was decided that the Irish Meteorological Service needed observations on an hourly basis from inland stations like Claremorris. It was decided to staff the station with full-time permanent personnel. In 1996, staff were relocated to Ireland West Airport and it now operates automatically with data uploaded to Dublin.

=== Climate ===
Claremorris has a temperate oceanic climate with cold winters and warm damp summers. The coldest months being January and February and the wettest being December and October. Claremorris is a very cloudy town, averaging less than 1,200 hours of sunshine annually. Climate in this area has mild differences between highs and lows, and there is adequate rainfall year-round. The Köppen Climate Classification subtype for this climate is "Cfb" (Marine West Coast Climate/Oceanic climate).

Climate data for Claremorris (1971-2000, extremes 1943–present)
Month	Jan	Feb	Mar	Apr	May	Jun	Jul	Aug	Sep	Oct	Nov	Dec	Year
Record high °C (°F)	15.7 (60.3)	13.8 (56.8)	20.1 (68.2)	22.5 (72.5)	25.4 (77.7)	29.8 (85.6)	30.5 (86.9)	29.5 (85.1)	26.4 (79.5)	21.7 (71.1)	16.1 (61.0)	15.7 (60.3)	30.5 (86.9)
Mean daily maximum °C (°F)	7.5 (45.5)	8.1 (46.6)	9.8 (49.6)	12.1 (53.8)	14.9 (58.8)	17.0 (62.6)	18.9 (66.0)	18.7 (65.7)	16.4 (61.5)	13.1 (55.6)	9.9 (49.8)	8.1 (46.6)	12.9 (55.2)
Daily mean °C (°F)	4.6 (40.3)	4.9 (40.8)	6.3 (43.3)	8.0 (46.4)	10.5 (50.9)	12.9 (55.2)	15.0 (59.0)	14.7 (58.5)	12.5 (54.5)	9.8 (49.6)	6.7 (44.1)	5.3 (41.5)	9.3 (48.7)
Mean daily minimum °C (°F)	1.7 (35.1)	1.8 (35.2)	2.9 (37.2)	3.9 (39.0)	6.1 (43.0)	8.8 (47.8)	11.0 (51.8)	10.6 (51.1)	8.6 (47.5)	6.4 (43.5)	3.5 (38.3)	2.5 (36.5)	5.7 (42.3)
Record low °C (°F)	−15.7 (3.7)	−17.1 (1.2)	−12.1 (10.2)	−5.5 (22.1)	−3.1 (26.4)	−0.4 (31.3)	0.6 (33.1)	1.1 (34.0)	−1.2 (29.8)	−4.5 (23.9)	−6.4 (20.5)	−15.0 (5.0)	−17.1 (1.2)
Average precipitation mm (inches)	127.9 (5.04)	102.1 (4.02)	101.6 (4.00)	63.7 (2.51)	68.1 (2.68)	64.5 (2.54)	70.1 (2.76)	95.7 (3.77)	94.3 (3.71)	128.2 (5.05)	127.7 (5.03)	129.6 (5.10)	1,173.6 (46.20)
Average precipitation days (≥ 1.0 mm)	18	15	17	12	12	11	12	13	14	17	18	17	176
Average snowy days	5.7	4.4	3.8	1.6	0.2	0.0	0.0	0.0	0.0	0.1	1.2	3.1	20.0
Average relative humidity (%) (at 15:00 LST)	85.6	79.8	75.7	67.9	68.0	71.1	73.2	73.4	74.7	80.2	84.4	88.1	76.8
Mean monthly sunshine hours	40.3	53.7	80.6	129.0	155.0	132.0	114.7	117.8	96.0	74.4	51.0	27.9	1,072.4
Mean daily sunshine hours	1.3	1.9	2.6	4.3	5.0	4.4	3.7	3.8	3.2	2.4	1.7	0.9	2.9
Source: Met Éireann

== Notable people ==
Claremorris is the birthplace of:

- Patrick Cassidy, orchestral, choral, and film score composer
- Lucinda Creighton, former Teachta Dála and Minister of State for European Affairs
- John Cardinal D'Alton, Primate of All Ireland and Archbishop of Armagh, 1946–1963
- Edward Delaney, sculptor
- John Gray, physician, surgeon, journalist, newspaper proprietor, and MP for Kilkenny City
- John Hegarty, 44th Provost of Trinity College, Dublin
- Conor Maguire, lawyer, revolutionary, politician, Attorney General, Chief Justice of Ireland, judge at the European Court of Human Rights, Chairman Irish Red Cross
- Greg Maher, footballer
- Delia Murphy, Singer and collector of Irish ballads
- Catherine Noone, former senator

== See also ==
- List of towns and villages in Ireland
