= Ard Scoil na nDéise =

Location
- Convent Road; Dungarvan, County Waterford; Ireland

Information
- Type: Voluntary secondary school
- Established: 1990
- Principal: Ciara Lucey
- Teaching staff: 28
- Gender: all girls
- Enrollment: 280
- Colour
- Website: https://ardscoildungarvan.com/

The Ard Scoil na nDéise is an all-girl's secondary school in Dungarvan, County Waterford, Ireland.

== History ==
The school was established in 1990 as an amalgamation of Coláiste Muire, run by the Sisters of Mercy, and St. Joseph's Secondary School, run by the Presentation Sisters.

In 2007, the school began operating under the trusteeship of CEIST Catholic Education an Irish Schools Trust. The school also has a student council. The Cáirde team is a student-mentoring initiative, which assists with the transition of incoming students.

== Curriculum ==
The school's core curriculum includes Gaeilge, English, Mathematics, Science, German or French, History, Geography, and Civic, Social & Political Education. The school offers a broad curriculum and a range of extracurricular activities. The school provides the Junior Certificate, an optional Transition Year (TY) programme, the established Leaving Certificate.
