= Ballina branch line =

- A CIÉ 071 Class locomotive at Ballina in 2016

Overview
- Status: Operational
- Locale: County Mayo
- Termini: Manulla Junction; Ballina
- Stations: 3

Service
- Type: Heavy rail, commuter rail
- System: Iarnród Éireann
- Services: Manulla Junction–Ballina
- Operator: Iarnród Éireann
- Rolling stock: 2800 Class, 071 Class, 201 Class

History
- Opened: 19 May 1873
- Killala closed: 1 July 1934

Technical
- Line length: 20 5/8 mi (33.2 km)
- Num of tracks: 1
- Track gauge: 5 ft 3 in (1,600 mm) Irish gauge
- Operating speed: 60 mph (97 km/h)

The Ballina branch line is a 20 5/8 miles (33.2 km) long railway line operated by Iarnród Éireann in County Mayo, in Ireland. The branch runs from Manulla Junction on the Dublin Heuston to Westport railway line, to the town of Ballina via Foxford.

The service mainly consists of a shuttle service along the branch, connecting with Dublin-Westport services at Manulla Junction. Branch trains are worked by 2800 class Commuter railcars. There are also several freight services carrying timber or containers from the branch which run to Waterford. These are generally worked by 071 and 201 class locomotives.

The line was opened on 19 May 1873 and was originally operated by the Midland Great Western Railway. From 1925 it became part of Great Southern Railways. The section from Ballina to the sea at Killala closed on 1 July 1934. From 1945 the line passed to the nationalised CIÉ then to its successor Iarnród Éireann.

The McCarthy Report, published in 2009, recommended the closure of the branch along with scrapping the plans for the Western Railway Corridor. Its recommendations would not be undertaken.

== Sources ==
- Baker, Michael H. C. (20 June 1972). Irish railways since 1916 (1st ed.). Ian Allan. ISBN 9780711002821.
