= Manulla Junction railway station =

Railway transfer station in County Mayo, Ireland

Manulla Junction Ghabhal Mhaigh Nulla
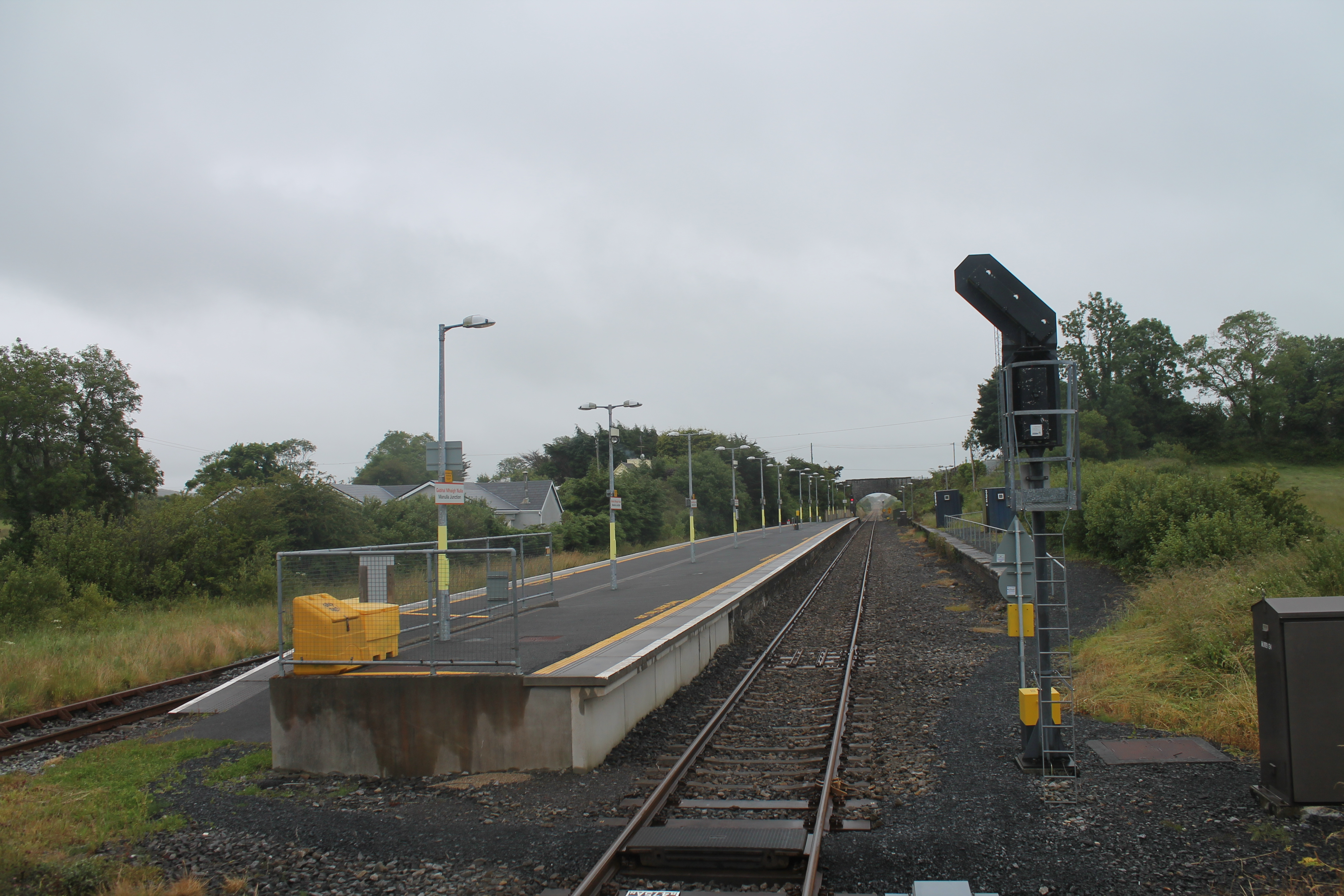
- Manulla Junction in July 2015

General information
- Location: Skiddernagh, County Mayo; Ireland
- Coordinates: 53.82792°N 09.192579°W
- System: InterCity Rail & Commuter Rail
- Lines: Dublin–Westport/Galway railway line Ballina branch line
- Distance: 145 miles 71 chains (234.8 km)
- Platforms: A single island with 2 platforms
- Tracks: 2
- Train operators: Iarnród Éireann

Construction
- Structure type: At-grade

Other information
- Status: Unstaffed
- Station code: MNLAJ

History
- Opened: 1 May 1868
- Original company: Midland Great Western Railway
- Post-grouping: Great Southern Railways

Key dates
- 17 June 1963: Closed
- 7 November 1988: Reopened
Route map
Location

Manulla Junction railway station is a transfer point for train passengers in County Mayo, Ireland.

== Description ==
It is a rare example of an interchange-only rail station. Passengers cannot enter or leave the station; it is only for passengers travelling to or from Foxford or Ballina, who transfer to or from Dublin–Westport trains.

A similar station is Smallbrook Junction, Isle of Wight, England, where Island Line trains only stop on days when the Isle of Wight Steam Railway is running, to allow passengers to change between lines.

Other examples are Sagliains railway station in Switzerland, Newark Liberty International Airport Station in New Jersey and the transfer platform at Pittsburg/Bay Point station in California.

== History ==
The station opened on 1 May 1868.

The signal cabin at the eastern end was destroyed in the Irish Civil War and was replaced by one at the Westport end.

The station was closed to passengers joining or leaving the railway network in 1963; however, passengers can still disembark to the platforms for connections to and from the Ballina branch line.

In 1988, the signal cabin was replaced by a portacabin-style structure on the island platform.

== Services ==
=== Train Services ===
The weekday off-peak service is as follows:

- 4 trains per day to Dublin Heuston
- 4 trains per day to Westport
- 1 train every 2 hours to Ballina

Currently, there is no direct railway route with passenger services connecting the Ballina line to the Dublin line. All passengers travelling between Ballina and Dublin must transfer at Manulla Junction.

Preceding station	Iarnród Éireann	Following station
Claremorris	InterCity; Dublin–Westport/Galway railway line	Castlebar
Terminus	Commuter; Ballina Branch Line	Foxford

=== Bus Services ===
Buses do not serve the station because there is no passenger access to the platforms.

== Incidents ==
On 5 September 1910, a train overran signals and 15 people were injured. The night mail had run into the engine of the branch line train and it was found shunting procedures at Manulla needed to be changed.

== Gallery ==
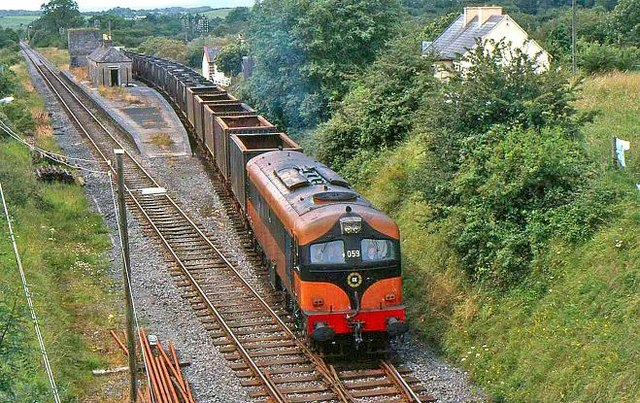
The Asahi liner train passing the closed station at Manulla Junction, 10th August 1985

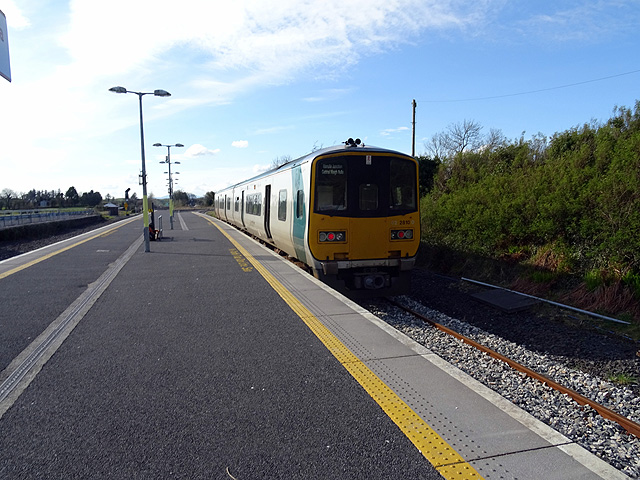
The Ballina shuttle train at Manulla Junction station, 13th April 2016

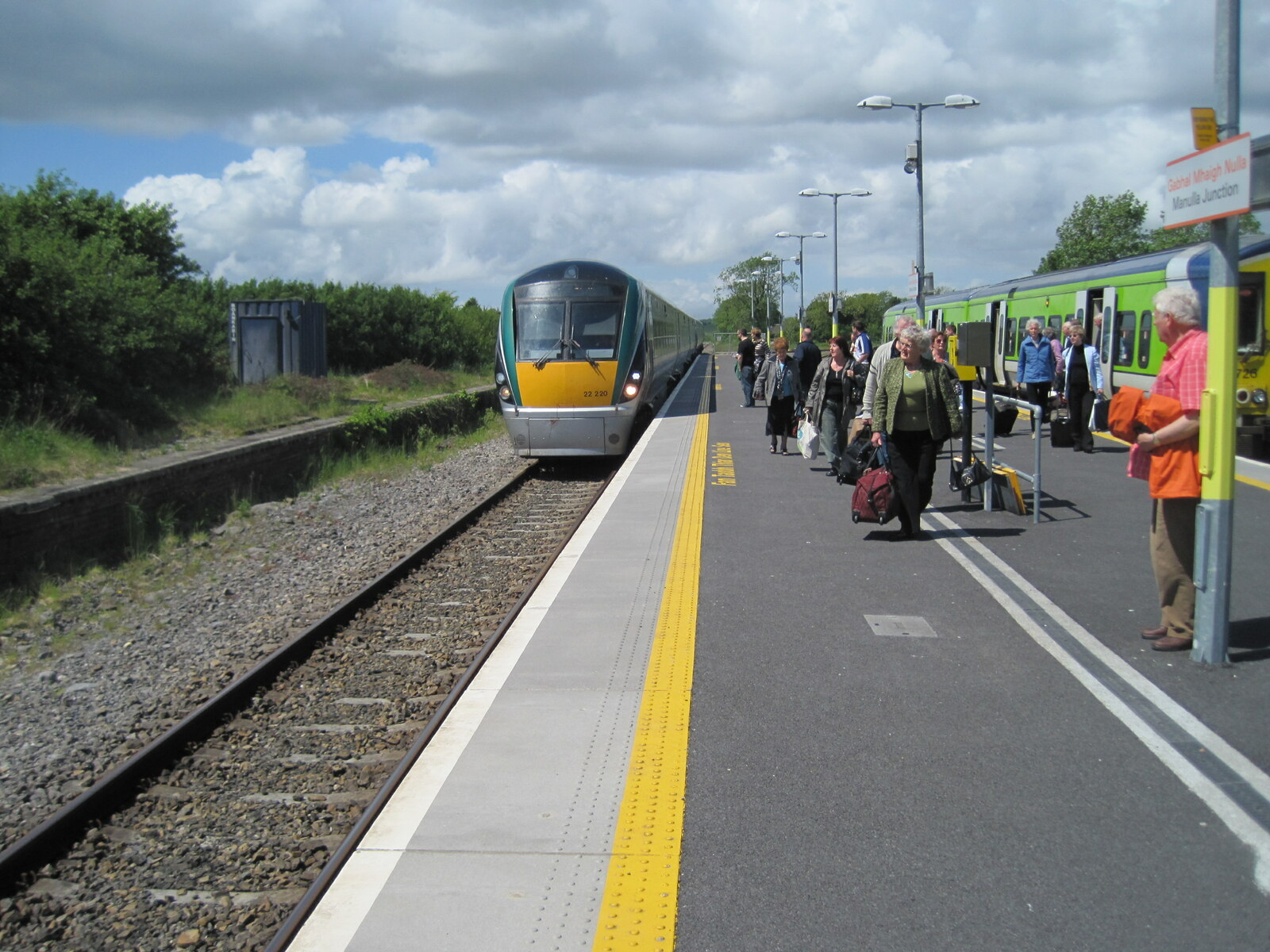
An Intercity train towards Dublin and a Commuter shuttle to Balina at Manulla Junction station, 4th June 2010

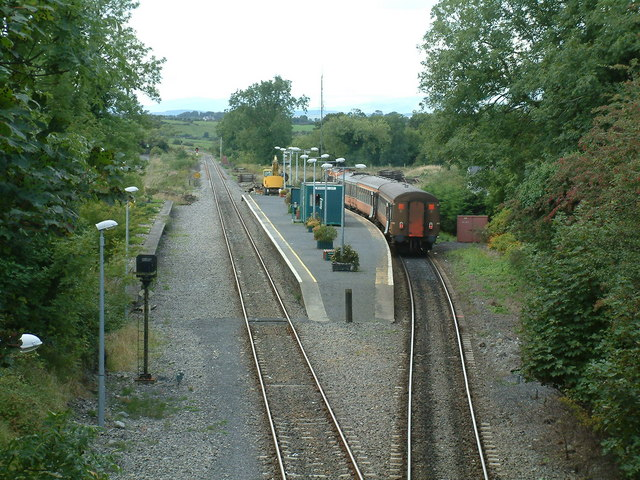
The train to Ballina is already waiting, doors open, for the Dublin Westport train to arrive at Manulla Junction station, 6th Sept 2006

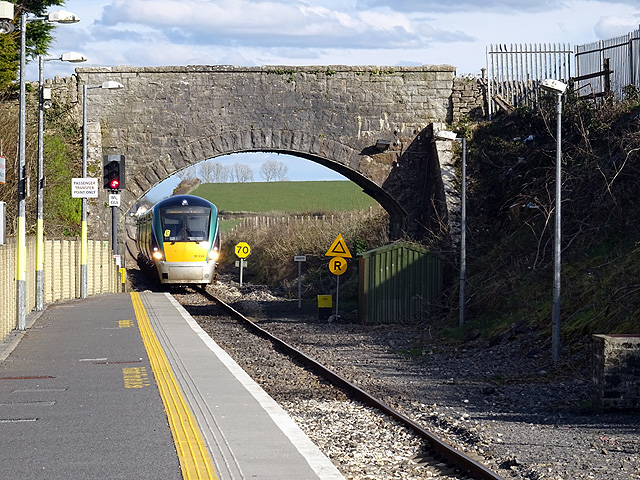
An InterCity train arriving at Manulla Junction station, heading for Westport, 13th April 2016
