= Abuse scandal in the Sisters of Mercy =

Allegations of abuse of children in certain institutions owned, managed, and largely staffed by the Sisters of Mercy, in Ireland, form a sub-set of allegations of child abuse made against Catholic clergy and members of Catholic religious institutes in several countries in the late 20th century. The abusive conduct allegedly perpetrated at institutions run by the Sisters of Mercy ranged from overuse of corporal punishment to emotional abuse, and included some accusations of sexual abuse by lay persons employed at the institutions.

== Background ==
In Ireland, the Sisters of Mercy operated, from the time of their foundation in 1831, as a series of autonomous convents, each of them subject to the authority and jurisdiction of their local bishop. For a period of 20 years from the mid-1960s onwards, a process of amalgamation was initiated by the Sisters whereby all convents in any given diocese in Ireland were gathered under a single leadership structure. By 1994 a second level of amalgamation was complete whereby all convents in all 26 dioceses of Ireland (together with the Congregation of the Sisters of Mercy in South Africa, who had a strong Irish connection) were united as a single organisation. They provided child care services and schooling through institutions worldwide, including at least 26 Industrial schools in Ireland where the institute was founded.

In 1996 Dear Daughter, a documentary looking at abuse allegations at St. Vincent's Industrial School, Goldenbridge, Ireland, which was run by the Sisters of Mercy, was screened on RTÉ Television. The documentary focused on allegations against a nun at the school by a former resident. Although serious concerns were raised about the validity of a key aspect of the testimony, and the allegations were denied by the nun concerned, the documentary led to further accounts of abuse at the school. A second documentary series, States of Fear, screened in 1999. States of Fear looked at allegations of abuse in the Irish industrial school system, prompting a strong public response, and this led to the formation of the Commission to Inquire into Child Abuse which examined abuse allegations against a number of Roman Catholic organisations in Ireland, including the Sisters of Mercy.

== Investigations and allegations ==
=== Nora Wall, 1999 ===
Nora Wall, a member of the Sisters of Mercy, was wrongfully convicted of rape in 1999. Paul Pablo McCabe, a homeless man with schizophrenia, was alleged to have twice raped a child at a group home managed by Wall. In relation to one of the two rape allegations, the Defence was able to prove that McCabe could not possibly have been there on the date in question – which was the 12th birthday of the accuser Regina Walsh. The jury acquitted him on that count and convicted him (and Nora Wall) on the second rape charge which did not specify an exact date.

On 17 June 1999, a week after the rape convictions, Regina Walsh gave an interview to journalist Barry O'Keefe of The Star newspaper claiming that she had also been raped by a "black man in Leicester Square" in London. This was news to Wall's defence team. Moreover, The Star published the names of Walsh and her "witness" Patricia Phelan for the first time. A Kilkenny businessman read the newspaper and recognised Phelan as the woman who had made a false rape allegation against himself, and the defence came into possession of this evidence. This rapidly led to the collapse of the convictions of the two accused and they were released from prison. Eventually on 1 December 2005 the Court of Criminal Appeal in Ireland certified that Wall had been the victim of a miscarriage of justice. McCabe had died in December 2002.

=== Influence of religious life ===
In May 2006, the Sisters of Mercy published a document entitled The Influence of Religious Values and/or Religious Life of the Sisters of Mercy on the Management of Industrial Schools describing ways their religious order's culture and practices may have adversely affected the care of children in their facilities. They report that:

- the strict schedule of religious practices may have been experienced by children as "harsh and demanding" and left children in the care of exclusively lay staff on a regular basis
- the value on silence may have limited communication with both children and staff
- the high value on work ethic and view of leisure as a luxury may have led to depriving children of necessary leisure
- the goal of treating all children equally led to minimizing physical affection for children
- the vow of obedience led to problems being understood as something to accept and bear rather than report and solve.

=== The Ryan Report, 2009 ===
In 1999, the Irish government established a non-statutory Commission to Inquire into Child Abuse, chaired by a High Court Judge, with broad terms of reference. Pursuant to various recommendations made by the Commission itself, it was re-established on a statutory basis in May 2000. One of its principal purposes was to provide an opportunity for persons who had suffered abuse in childhood in institutions to recount that abuse, but it also had extensive investigatory functions. The period covered by the work of the commission was initially from 1946 to 1999, but it was subsequently extended to cover the years from 1914 to 2000. In September 2003, a senior barrister, Mr Sean Ryan S.C., was appointed to chair the commission in place of its original chair, Ms Justice Laffoy, who stood down in January 2004. The Commission having concluded its work, it submitted a Report to the government which was released on 20 May 2009 and came to be known as the Ryan Report. The Report recognised that:

"the issue of sexual abuse did not feature as prominently in the evidence in relation to schools run by the Sisters of Mercy as it did in relation to schools run by other religious communities"

but it concluded that other forms of abuse occurred. Concerns were expressed in regard to such abuse at a number of schools, specifically: St Vincent's Industrial School, Goldenbridge; St Michael's Industrial School, Cappoquin, County Waterford; St Joseph's Industrial School, Clifden; Our Lady of Succour Industrial School, Newtownforbes; and St Joseph's Industrial School, Dundalk - all of which closed down between 1969 and 1999. The instances of abuse which the Ryan Commission found had occurred at these institutions varied considerably in nature, duration and extent. It ranged principally from overuse of corporal punishment to neglect of various kinds, but the Ryan Commission also noted, "some very serious incidents of sexual abuse perpetrated by lay staff in some schools".

The 2009 Ryan report described government reports from the 1930s and 40s indicating that children in the care of the Sisters of Mercy were routinely malnourished, and the order sometimes opposed reforms at this time. However, the Ryan report also describes the Sisters of Mercy as leading reforms in the wake of the Kennedy report (1970), which led to the system of institutional homes and industrial schools was replaced by group homes in the 1970s and 1980s. The Sisters of Mercy became aware of allegations of abusive conditions in the industrial schools in the late 1980s and early 1990s, by which time many members of the order had never seen the industrial schools. In 1996 Dear Daughter, a documentary film, described St. Vincent's Industrial School, Goldenbridge, a facility operated by the Sisters of Mercy, as emotionally abusive. The order conducted an inquiry during the production of the film, and found the allegations of poor conditions in the film to be largely credible, and to be generalizable to many of the industrial schools they operated. The order acknowledged that the industrial schools had been "harsh and insensitive to the needs of children, that it was inadequate and did not meet their basic needs" and responded by arranging a helpline with counselors available to people who attended the schools. The order attributed the poor conditions to the overly large size of the institutions, insufficient staff, insufficient training for staff, and insufficient funding. The order has acknowledged the routine use of corporal punishment at the industrial schools, which was common practice in Ireland at the time, while denying that systematic physical abuse occurred at any time in facilities they operated.

=== Other abuse allegations ===
A 1998 Australian documentary described allegations of abuse from Sisters of Mercy orphanages in the 1950s and 1960s. Earlier allegations of sexual abuse at the Meteor Park Orphanage at Neerkol near Rockhampton had led to two people being charged, and complaints in regard to the orphanage resulted in moves by the Sisters of Mercy and the Church to negotiate a settlement with "more than 60 former residents". In South Australia, a similar move to settle resulted from complaints in regard to care at the Goodwood orphanage, which was also run by the Sisters of Mercy.

=== Neerkol ===
In 1993, several former residents of the St Joseph's Orphanage at Neerkol, 19 kilometres west of Rockhampton, came forward to the Catholic Church and the Queensland Police Service to report allegations of sexual and physical abuse that they were subject to during their time at the orphanage as children. This was following the publication of a book written by a former resident of St Joseph's Orphanage that detailed the sexual abuse she endured at the orphanage.

In 1996, the State Government Minister for Families Kevin Lingard told a parliamentary sitting that six calls had been received to a special national telephone hotline set up by an advocacy group called Broken Rites. The callers were former residents with allegations that they too had received abuse from priest and nuns at the orphanage.

In 1997, Father Reginald Basil Durham was charged with 40 sexual offences against five former residents of St Joseph's Orphanage and a former member of his parish. Thirty-four charged were eventually dropped but Durham pleaded guilty to six. In 1999, Durham was sentenced to 18 months jail with a non-parole period of four months. However, after successfully appealing his punishment, his lawyers successfully argued that due to his age and frailty, he was deemed to be too unfit for a retrial and therefore no further sentence was imposed on Durham before his death in 2002.

In 2003, the Queensland Government accidentally sent confidential documents to one of Durham's victims, who was angry that not only Durham had walked free but that she had been told there was no record of Father Reginald Durham being at the orphanage when he abused her at the age of 14, so refused to give the documents back to the Queensland Government.

In April 2015, Case Study 26 of the Royal Commission into Institutional Responses to Child Sexual Abuse was held in Rockhampton, which was part of a series of public hearings designed to examine evidence of child sexual abuse and how institutions responded to the allegations of that abuse. This particular public hearing was held to examine the experiences of a number of people who had resided at St Joseph's Orphanage at Neerkol as children, and to examine the responses to the allegations made by those former resident from the relevant bodies such as the Sisters of Mercy, the Catholic Church and the Queensland Government.

An earlier inquiry had already found that hundreds of children had been sexually abused, beaten and forced into hard labour at the Neerkol orphanage and soon after the 2015 hearing commenced, the treatment of children at the orphanage was similarly unpleasant which was described as vicious and sadistic. Victims shared graphic descriptions of the abuse they suffered at the hands of priests and nuns at the orphanage. One victim told the hearing that two priests sexually abused her while nuns would punch and slap her. One nun flogged her so hard with a skipping rope that she had struggled to walk for several days after.

During the hearing, former Rockhampton bishop Brian Heenan conceded that his handling of historical child abuse allegations from residents of St Joseph's Orphanage had been inadequate and that he had failed to protect children in his diocese from a paedophile priest because it took him years to take the allegations seriously. He expressed regret for writing a letter in 1996 which described the allegations of abuse as scurrilous and scandalous which angered abuse victims at the time. When questioned at the hearing, Bishop Heenan also admitted to being more concerned about protecting the reputation of the Catholic Church than considering the impact of abuse victims.

A transcript of the letter has been published online by victim advocacy group Broken Rites, and reads:

Over recent weeks, scurrilous allegations have been made against the Sisters and the priests, in the form of claims of physical and sexual abuse. Slanderous statements have been made about the conduct of the orphanage, the conditions that prevailed there, and in general about the care that was given to the children... I will not remain silent while the immeasurable benefit that has come to many children through the dedication of the Sisters, is destroyed by sensationally written media articles or TV programs, which do not speak the truth... St Joseph's Orphanage will live on with its fine reputation in spite of what has been published.

Bishop Heenan was also questioned about the reasons he wrote Father Reginald Basil Durham a character reference for his sentencing hearing, when Durham was charged with 40 sexual offences against five former residents of St Joseph's Orphanage, particularly his wording in the reference where he described that Durham had "a unique gift with youth".

Sister Berneice Loch was also questioned during the public hearing. The Royal Commission panel heard that instead of contacting former residents to discuss the allegations of physical and sexual abuse, Sister Loch sought out information and even drafted a media release in an attempt to counteract what she saw as sensationalistic rumours. Sister Loch told the hearing that she still believed that former State Government Minister for Families, Kevin Lingard gave a sensationalised statement when he raised the allegations of abuse at a 1996 parliamentary sitting, revealing that six calls had been received from former residents with further allegations continuing to be received about abuse by priests and nuns at the orphanage. The hearing also heard that Sister Loch discredited a book, written by one of the witnesses at the Royal Commission in the early 1990s detailing the sexual abuse she endured at the orphanage – a view she held until 1997 despite several other abuse victims coming forward in the meantime.

Several books have been published about the horrors children at the Neerkol orphanage endured, including St Joseph's Home Neerkol by abuse victim Fay Hicks (the 1993 book which prompted other Neerkol victims to come forward) and Nightmare at Neerkol by abuse victim Garnett Williams who released the book in 2009 at the age of 73. Around the same time, Garnett Williams received $40,000 in compensation from the state government and $25,000 in compensation from the Sisters of Mercy.

== Response ==
The Sisters of Mercy in Ireland formally apologised for any abuse suffered by children in their care in May 2004. In doing so they accepted that children had suffered, and they made the apology unconditional. In December 2009, the Sisters announced that they would contribute an additional 128 million euros to the fund to compensate victims. This was in addition to the previously agreed 127.5 million euro offer that the Irish government had formed with the Catholic Orders as a whole.

== See also ==
- Sexual abuse scandal in the Congregation of Christian Brothers
