= Tristram Chivers =

Canadian inorganic chemist

Tristram Chivers FRSC
- Born: August 22, 1940 (age 86)
- Citizenship: United Kingdom and Canada
- Education: Durham University (BSc, PhD)
- Scientific career
- Fields: Inorganic chemistry
- Workplaces: University of Calgary
- Thesis: Some pentafluorophenyl derivatives of tin and boron (1964)
- Doctoral advisor: Richard Dickinson Chambers

Tristram Chivers (born 22 August 1940) is a British-Canadian chemist and Professor Emeritus at the University of Calgary. His main research interest is the inorganic chemistry of the main group elements, particularly boron, nitrogen, phosphorus, sulfur, selenium, and tellurium.

Chivers was elected a Fellow of the Royal Society of Canada in 1991 and is also a Fellow of the Chemical Institute of Canada. He has been described as the "godfather" of main group chemistry in Canada.

== Early life and education ==
Chivers was born in Bath, Somerset and attended Colston's School in Bristol. He graduated from Durham University in 1961 with a first-class degree in chemistry.

He stayed on at Durham for doctoral studies, and completed his PhD in 1964 under the supervision of R. D. Chambers. He was awarded the DSc degree by Durham University in 1981.

== Career and research ==
After brief periods as a postdoc at the University of Cincinnati and a tutorial fellow at the University of Sussex, Chivers moved permanently to Canada in 1967, joining the University of British Columbia as a teaching postdoctoral fellow. In 1969, he joined the University of Calgary as an assistant professor, becoming a full professor in 1978. He served as head of the Department of Chemistry from 1977 to 1982.

At Calgary, Chivers and his colleagues made "notable contributions" to the chemistry of chalcogen compounds. His early work included identifying the blue species formed by sulfur in reducing media as the trisulfur radical anion, which was subsequently shown by Robin Clark to be the blue chromophore in the mineral lapis lazuli. Several ring and cage compounds discovered by Chivers and his collaborators became "textbook examples"; the 1998 edition of Chemistry of the Elements by Norman Greenwood and Alan Earnshaw devoted twelve pages to sulfur–nitrogen chemistry originating from his laboratory.

Chivers was senior editor of the Canadian Journal of Chemistry from 1993 to 1998 and served as president of the Canadian Society for Chemistry (CSC) from 2000 to 2001.

He received the E. W. R. Steacie Award from the Canadian Society for Chemistry in 2001 and an honorary degree from the University of Oulu in Finland in 2006. In 2025, he received the Wolfgang Günther Award for Lifetime Achievement in Selenium and Tellurium Chemistry.

== Selected publications ==
=== Books ===
- Chivers, Tristram (2005). A Guide to Chalcogen–Nitrogen Chemistry. World Scientific. ISBN 9789812560957.
- ———; Manners, Ian (2009). Inorganic Rings and Polymers of the p-Block Elements: From Fundamentals to Applications. Royal Society of Chemistry. ISBN 9781847559067.
- ———; Laitinen, Risto S. (2021). Chalcogen–Nitrogen Chemistry: From Fundamentals to Applications in Biological, Physical and Materials Sciences. World Scientific. ISBN 9789811241352.

=== Journal articles ===
- Chivers, Tristram; Drummond, I. (1972). "Characterization of the trisulfur radical anion S_{3}^{−} in blue solutions of alkali polysulfides in hexamethylphosphoramide" (PDF). Inorganic Chemistry. 11 (10): 2521–2523. doi:10.1021/ic50116a047.
- ——— (1985). "Synthetic methods and structure-reactivity relationships in electron-rich sulfur-nitrogen rings and cages" (PDF). Chemical Reviews. 85 (5): 341–365. doi:10.1021/cr00069a001.
- ———; Gao, X.; Parvez, M. (1996). "Preparation, Crystal Structures, and Isomerization of the Tellurium Diimide Dimers RNTe(μ-NR′)_{2}TeNR (R = R′ = ^{t}Bu; R = PPh_{2}NSiMe_{3}, R′ = ^{t}Bu, ^{t}Oct): X-ray Structure of the Telluradiazole Dimer [^{t}Bu_{2}C_{6}H_{2}N_{2}Te]_{2}" (PDF). Inorganic Chemistry. 35 (1): 9–15.
- Briand, G.; Chivers, T.; Parvez, M. (2002). "A new approach to metalated imido and amido tellurophosphoranes" (PDF). Angewandte Chemie International Edition. 41 (18): 3468–3470.
- Garje, S. S.; Eisler, D. J.; Ritch, J. S.; Afzaal, M.; O’Brien, P.; Chivers, T. (2006). "A new route to antimony telluride nanoplates from a single-source precursor" (PDF). Journal of the American Chemical Society. 128 (10): 3120–3121. doi:10.1021/ja0582408.
- ———; Laitinen, Risto S. (2015). "Tellurium: a maverick among the chalcogens". Chemical Society Reviews. 44 (7): 1725–1739. doi:10.1039/C4CS00434E.
