= Dundonald High School =

- Dundonald princeps schola
- School badge

Location
- 764 Upper Newtownards Road; Dundonald, County Down, BT16 1TH; Northern Ireland; 54.5966°N 5.7904°W

Information
- Former name: Dundonald Boys' High School
- School type: Post-Primary Government Controlled Secondary School
- Motto: Absque Labore Nihil (Latin) (Nothing Without Labor)
- Denomination: Multi
- Established: 1970s
- Status: Open
- Sister school: Dundonald Girl's High School (Merged)
- School district: Lisburn & Castlereagh City Council
- Authority: The Education Authority for Northern Ireland; South Eastern Education and Library Board
- School number: 4210262
- Principal: Ken Perry
- Years: 8-12
- Gender: Mixed
- Age range: 11 - 17
- Enrollment: 600 (approx)
- International students: Yes
- Education system: CCEA
- Classes offered: Level 1 - Level 2 Qualifications
- Schedule: Monday - Friday
- Hours in school day: 6-7
- Campuses: A, B, C + D block
- Campus size: Total distance: 1.34 km (4,390.14 ft)
- Area: Total area: 103,255.71 m² (1,111,435.16 ft²
- Campus type: Block System
- Student Union/Association: National Union of Students-Union of Students in Ireland (NUS-USI)
- Colours: Black, maroon, grey
- Slogan: "A caring school at the heart of the community"
- Song: "Run" by Snow Patrol
- Athletics: Yes
- Sports: Association football; rugby union; netball
- Newspaper: DHS Newsletter
- Key products: Community Servicing
- Endowment: Dundonald Foodbank
- Budget: Set by EA
- School fees: N/A - Government Funded / Optional School Funds by parents annually
- Communities served: Dundonald, Newtownards, Comber, Bangor, Belfast
- Website: dundonaldhigh.co.uk

Dundonald High School is a controlled co-educational secondary school located in Dundonald, in Northern Ireland. The school opened in the early-1970s as Dundonald Boy's High School. Dundonald High School offers education to 11 to 16-year-olds. Dundonald Girl's High School eventually merged with the Boy's High School in 1990.

Students come from the Dundonald area, Bangor, Newtownards, Holywood, Comber, Gilnahirk and Belfast. Students of all ethnic, religious backgrounds and country origins are welcomed, with students from countries such as Portugal, Hungary, Bangladesh and Estonia have attended the school.

The school badge is similar to the County Down coat of arms with the motto "Absque Labore Nihil" which translates to "Nothing Without Labour" in Latin. The school is run under the South Eastern Education and Library Board (SEELB).

The school is located on the Upper Newtownards Road. The River Enler runs beside the school. Dundonald High School is partnered with Presentation College Headford, in County Galway, Ireland.

The school offers a wide range of subjects that include: English, mathematics, home economics, music, technology, art and design, French, Spanish, geography, history, OCN Well-being, Prince's Trust, learning for life and work, science, horticulture, business studies, physical education and information and communications technology. These subjects (excluding compulsory English, maths and science) are made available to Key Stage 4 level students to choose from. Regulated Qualifications Framework (RQF) is the qualification framework used. The GCSE-level or level 1 and 2 qualifications are awarded from CCEA, Edexcel, Essential Skills, Key Skills, AQA, BTEC and Open College Network (OCN) education boards. Extra qualification and learning events come from Young Enterprise.

The high school runs an annual celebration of success programme, awarding students for their efforts and achievements throughout the school year. The programme exhibits a range of musical performances throughout. Parents and special guests attend, such as local primary principals, volunteers and community workers.

== History ==
In the 20th century, Dundonald saw two separate high schools, Dundonald Girls High School and Dundonald Boys High School. After many decades the two schools amalgamated into one mixed-gender school in 1990 in hopes of attracting more pupils.

In 2012, Sinn Féin member John O'Dowd made a proposal to close Dundonald High School, as well as the proposal to close Orangefield High School, due to low pupil numbers and for financial reasons. The community of Dundonald, students, parents and school staff fought hard for two years to keep the school open. UUP party leader Mike Nesbitt fought to keep Dundonald High School open. In 2014, Orangefield closed permanently, with the overwhelming decision in Stormont that Dundonald High School would remain open. The acting principal, Ken Perry was strongly proud and thankful for the final decision. Mr. Perry was a past pupil of the school who went on to become the full-time principal of Dundonald High School. His main aim was to increase the number of students within the school. Enrollment numbers began to rise, with a maximum 100 pupils entering year 8 in 2016. Along with this, saw the GCSE grades rise to record-breaking heights for the school.

In 2015, the Dundonald High School Bowls team were Runners-up in the Irish Bowls Federation Competition. In November, the Senior Girls' Rugby team won the Castlereagh and Lisburn Rugby Blitz competition at Lisnagarvey playing fields.

In 2016, the school was refurbished and modernised and saw the introduction of educational iPads.

== House system ==
In 2015, the school introduced a house system where pupils were put into one of three houses, in which are named after genera of plants. These have been planted at the school gates by school students along with DUP MLA's including Gavin Robinson. Students can earn points for their respective house based on strong attendance and valiant work efforts and contributions to the school. The awards include prizes and school trips. The houses are represented in teams on events such as sports day and rounders day in which they collect points for their house. The three houses are:

| House | House colour |
|---|---|
| Rowan | Green |
| Willow | Red |
| Juniper | Yellow |

== Sports ==
- Aerobics
- Badminton
- Basketball
- Bowls
- Cricket
- Dodgeball
- Football
- Gymnastics
- High jump
- Hoopla
- Hockey
- Long jump
- Netball
- Rounders
- Running
- Rugby union
- Tennis
- Track and field
- Volleyball

== Notable alumni ==
- Colin Murray - BBC Sports, music radio, and television presenter.
- David Jeffrey - Former Linfield and Northern Ireland football player and Manager.
- Juliette McCutcheon - Tuba player, Newtownards Silver Band member and BBC Radio Ulster Band Series musician.
- Lewis Nickell - BBC Three chat show host with Tourette's Syndrome - "What makes you tic?".
- Ryan Annett - DJ and radio presenter on Q Radio and Cool FM.

== See also ==
- List of schools in Northern Ireland
- List of secondary schools in Northern Ireland
