= Foxford railway station =

Railway station in Ireland

Foxford Béal Easa
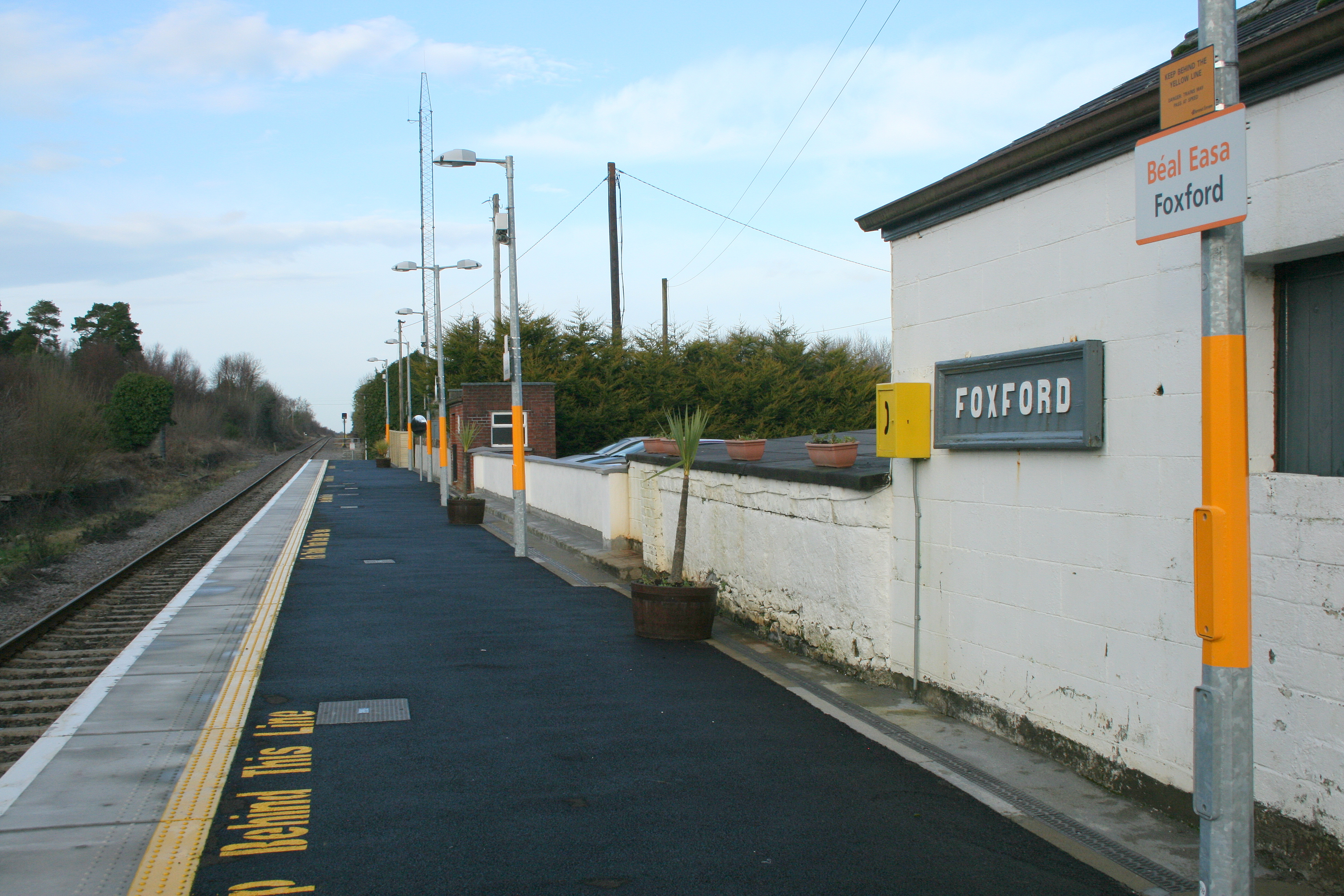
- The single platform at Foxford

General information
- Location: Station Road, Foxford, County Mayo, F26 F950; Ireland
- Coordinates: 53°58′58″N 9°8′3″W
- Operator: Iarnród Éireann
- Line: Ballina branch line
- Platforms: 1
- Tracks: 1
- Train operators: Iarnród Éireann

Construction
- Structure type: At-grade
- Parking: Spaces = 25; Rates = Free at Present
- Cycle facilities: No bike facilities available

Other information
- Station code: FXFRD

Key dates
- 1 May 1868: Station opened
- 1963: Station closed
- 1988: Station reopened
- Iarnród Éireann; CIÉ; IÉ railway stations
Route map
Location

Foxford railway station serves the town of Foxford in County Mayo, Ireland.

The station is on the Dublin to Ballina service (Direct or Transfer at Manulla Junction). Passengers can travel to Westport by travelling to Manulla Junction and changing trains.

== History ==
The station opened on 1 May 1868. It was closed in 1963 and reopened in 1988.

The line is owned by the state company Córas Iompair Éireann (CIÉ), and previously by the Midland Great Western Railway. The station has a single track and platform. The remains of a second platform on the western side of the line are still visible.

== Services ==
=== Train Services ===
The typical weekday off-peak service is as follows:

- 1 train every 2 hours to Ballina
- 1 train every 2 hours to Manulla Junction

Preceding station	Iarnród Éireann	Following station
Manulla Junction	Commuter; Ballina Branch Line	Ballina

=== Bus Services ===
No buses serve the station directly, but the 430 Citylink bus serves the nearby village of Foxford, which is a 21-minute walk from the station.

== Gallery ==
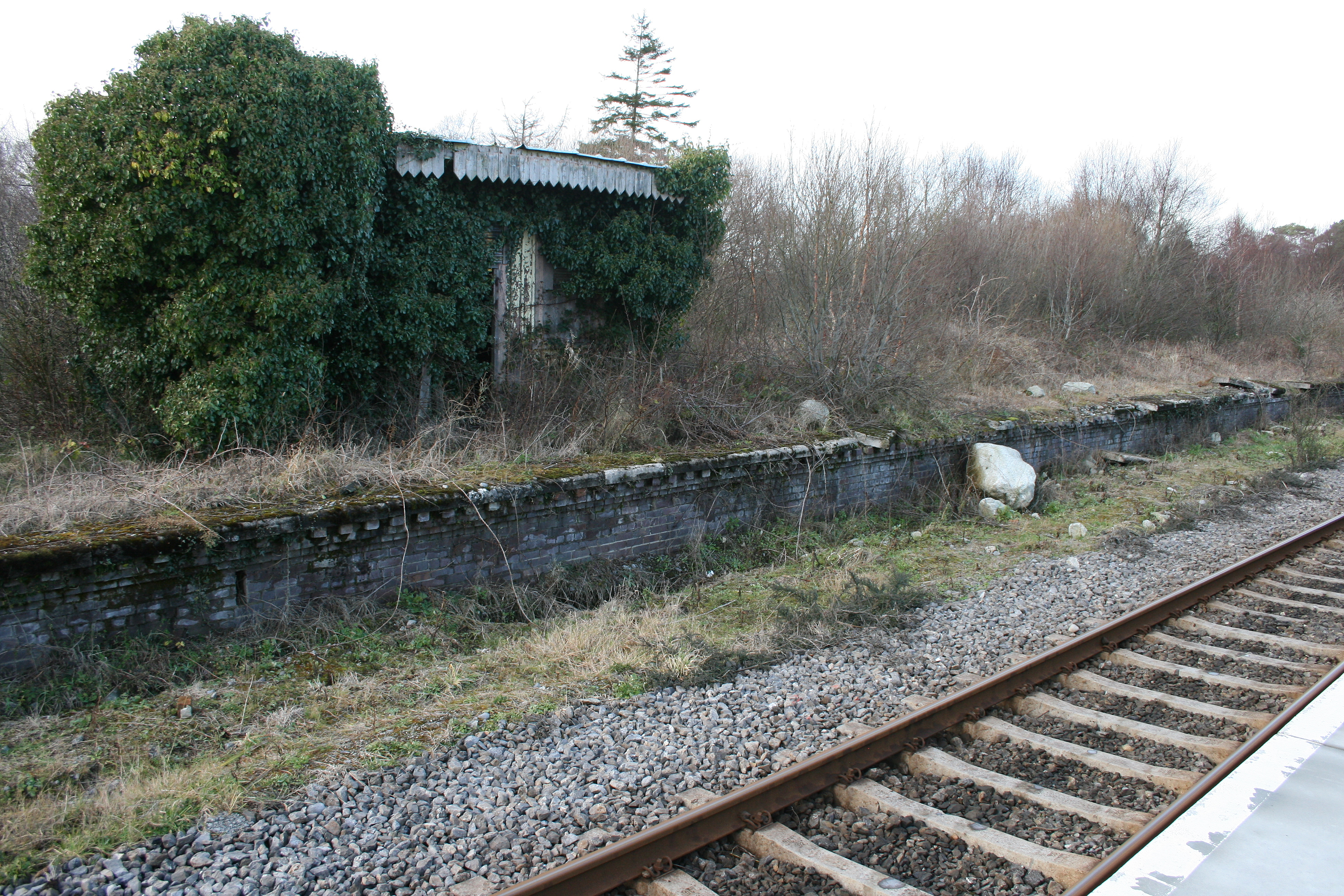
Abandoned western platform

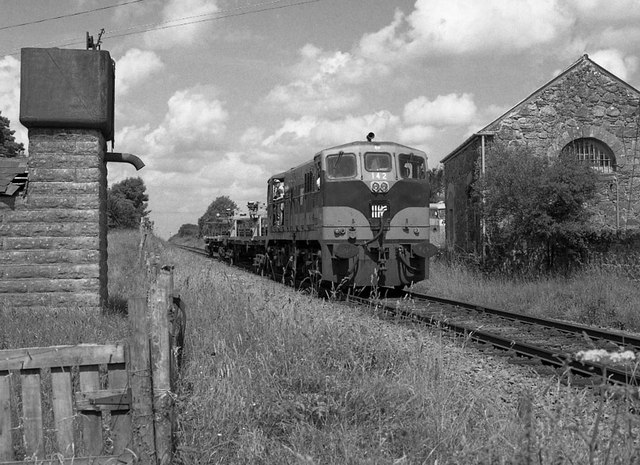
An Irish Rail 141 class locomotive brings a permanent way train towards Foxford station, 13 July 1990

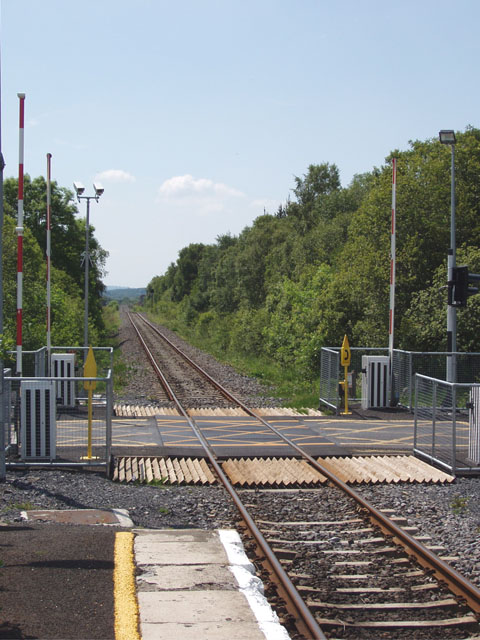
Level Crossing at Foxford station, 6 June 2007

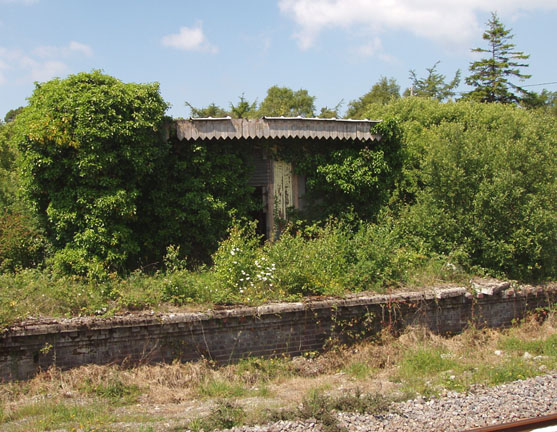
Ruins of old waiting room at Foxford station, 6 June 2007

== See also ==
- List of railway stations in Ireland
