= Sancta Maria College, Rathfarnham =

Secondary school in County Dublin, Ireland

Coordinates: 53.2846°N 6.3043°W

Sancta Maria College is a girls' Catholic voluntary secondary school in Ballyroan, Rathfarnham, County Dublin, Ireland. The school is governed by a board of management. There are approximately 525 students and 34 permanent teachers. It is run by the Sisters of Mercy.

== History ==
In 1932 the building that now houses the Sisters of Mercy was given as a gift to the order by the owners, the McCabe sisters. The order's Mercy Community in Carysfort near Blackrock were gratified but had no plans for this big building. They decided to make it a holiday home for girls called St. Mary's Convent and it was blessed and opened on 26 July 1932.

In 1942 Archbishop McQuaid approached the Superior of the Sisters of Mary believing that the convent would be a good place to treat children in the early stages of tuberculosis. The Red Cross Society was looking for a place to treat these children. For 16 years the house served as a Preventorium.

By 1959 tuberculosis was under control but a new need had arisen in this beautiful area of South Dublin, i.e. education. The population of Ballyroan was increasing and a school was needed. On 8 September 1960, Sancta Maria College was opened.

Around the year 1963 the assembly hall was built.

In the 1960s, The junior school was taught by a staff of three, Sr. Marian Agnes Sr. Regina Assumpta and Sr. Dolores. Boys and girls normally started at three years of age.

== Academics ==
The school offers students three Leaving Certificate courses: Leaving Certificate, LCVP and LCA.

In 2007, 35% of the students who sat the Leaving Certificate enrolled on a University Course.

In 2008, 89 out of 90 Leaving Certificate students enrolled on a University Course. Seven of these students were offered places in the National College of Art and Design, with another two on the waiting list. This latter figure made Sancta Maria the school with the highest number of entrants into NCAD in the Republic of Ireland.

== Other programs ==
The school introduced a Transition Year programme in 1991. The school also has links with Coláiste Éanna and Butterfield Residents Association, who have funded the school's Green School Committee in the past.

== See also ==
- Abuse scandal in the Sisters of Mercy
