= Richard Chambers (journalist) =

Irish journalist and author (born 1989)

- Born: 1989 (age 36–37); Belfast
- Education: University College Dublin, Dublin City University
- Occupations: Journalist, author
- Employer: Virgin Media

Richard Chambers (born 1989) is an Irish journalist and author who currently works as a news correspondent for Virgin Media News.

== Early life ==
Chambers was born in Belfast. He grew up in Lahinch, County Clare before moving to Rush, County Dublin, where he attended St. Joseph's Secondary School. Chambers has one older brother, Jeffrey.

Chambers studied law at University College Dublin, which he stated he didn't enjoy due to the long commute. He joined the College Tribune, the university's student newspaper, where he began covering sports by his final year. He later received a master's degree in journalism from Dublin City University.

== Career ==
Chambers started his career with an internship at Today FM. After working for the Irish Daily Star for a short spell, Chambers returned to Today FM, before joining Newstalk. Chambers was a news reporter for Newstalk from 2013 before joining Virgin Media in August 2018. In 2021, he was promoted to news correspondent. Chambers was ranked the 8th most influential journalist in Ireland by PR consultants Murray in 2021.

Chambers was involved in the coverage of the COVID-19 pandemic, reporting on the daily case figures, vaccination uptake and announcements of government restrictions on his Twitter account. He wrote A State Of Emergency: The Story of Ireland's Covid Crisis, a book about the pandemic and Ireland's response in 2021. His book was nominated for the 2021 Irish Book Awards, and was described by RTÉ's Sinéad Crowley as one of her "books of the year". Health minister Stephen Donnelly was interviewed about the book on Prime Time in November 2021, with Donnelly saying he "wouldn't be reading" the book and that it didn't "marry" Donnelly "with [his] experience".

== Personal life ==
Chambers was previously in a relationship with author Louise O'Neill, who he met in 2018. He previously lived in a house-share in Castleknock with fellow Virgin Media News correspondent Zara King.

Chambers was involved in an online feud with Westlife's Brian McFadden, with McFadden describing him as a "knobhead".

He is a supporter of Bohemian F.C.
