= Presentation Secondary School, Clonmel =

School in County Tipperary, Ireland

Coordinates: 52.3487°N 7.7172°W

Presentation Secondary School is a secondary school established by the Presentation Sisters for the education of girls in Clonmel, County Tipperary in Ireland. Construction of the school started in 1865, and it was completed the following year. The site currently includes the accommodation building of a former boarding school built in 1937, "with the main object of fostering vocations". It has operated under the trusteeship of CEIST (Catholic Education an Irish Schools Trust) since 2007. In 2013, a group of transition year students from the school released a commemorative charity single that reached number seven in the Irish Singles Chart. As of 2024, the school had an enrollment of over 470 students.
