= Richard Dickinson Chambers =

British chemist (1935–2019)

Richard Dickinson Chambers FRS (16 March 1935 — 18 April 2019) was a British organofluorine chemist. He was Emeritus Professor of Chemistry at Durham University.

From West Stanley, Chambers studied chemistry at Durham University and joined the faculty of the Department of Chemistry in 1960. He retired in 2000. By the time of his retirement he had supervised 96 PhD students to completion, among them Lord Cunningham of Felling and Tristram Chivers.

In 1997 he was elected Fellow of the Royal Society and in 2003 his fluorine research was recognised with the Prix Henri Moissan from the Maison de la Chimie in Paris.

== Extra reading ==
- "Professor Dick Chambers obituary". The Times. 4 June 2019.
