= Monastic silence =

Spiritual practice

Saint Peter Martyr invites to Silence by Fra Angelico

Monastic silence is a spiritual practice recommended in a variety of religious traditions for purposes including becoming closer to God and achieving elevated states of spiritual purity. It may be in accordance with a monk's formal vow of silence, but can also engage laity who have not taken vows, or novices who are preparing to take vows.

== Practice of silence by ordained and laity ==
The practice of silence is observed during different parts of the day; practitioners talk when they need to but maintain a sense of silence or a sense of prayer when talking. The rules of silence apply to both vowed practitioners and non-vowed guests. Religious recommendations of silence as praxis do not deprecate speech when it is thoughtful and considerate of commonly held values. According to Andrew March of the Benedictine order, we "can listen to substantive speech for hours while five minutes of garrulous speech is too much." "Silence" may include what might be more aptly characterized as "quietness", i.e. speaking in low voice tones.

== Christian contemplative traditions ==
In Christianity, monastic silence is more highly developed in the Roman Catholic faith than in Protestantism, but it is not limited to Catholicism. The practice has a corresponding manifestation in the Orthodox church, which teaches that silence is a means to access God, to develop self-knowledge, or to live more harmoniously. Theophilus, patriarch of Alexandria, placed the virtue of silence on par with the faith itself in a synodal letter from AD 400. "Monks—if they wish to be what they are called—will love silence and the Catholic faith, for nothing at all is more important than these two things."

=== Old Testament roots ===
In the book Silence, The Still Small Voice of God, Andrew March establishes the roots of the silence doctrine in the Psalms attributed to David. "Benedict and his monastics would know from chanting the Psalter every week the verse that follows: 'I was silent and still; I held my peace to no avail; my distress grew worse, my heart became hot within me. While I mused, the fire burned; then I spoke with my tongue' (Psalm 39:3)."

St. Norbet's Arts Center also anchors its views on silence in the Old Testament: "For God alone my soul waits in silence; from him comes my salvation." (Psalm 62)

=== Aids to practice ===
The Trappist rubric "Living in silence" illustrates centuries-old hand gestures which were "developed to convey basic communication of work and spirit".

=== Eastern Orthodox ===
In Eastern Orthodox Christianity, the mystical tradition of hesychasm emphasizes the importance of hesychia ('silence' or 'stillness').

=== Benedictine ===
Silence plays a role in the Benedictine rule. It is thought that by clearing the mind of distraction, one may listen more attentively to the deity.

Christian theology differs from Dharmic religions with regard to the mode in which spiritual ascent transpires within the context of contemplative quiet. Buddhism and Hinduism promote various spiritual practices, as do many Christian denominations. However, Christianity, particularly Protestantism, emphasizes the belief that ultimate spiritual achievement is not within the grasp of mortals, no matter how persistent their practice may be. Rather, the mechanism of spiritual attainment, which they regard as salvation and proximity to the deity, is believed to occur solely through supernatural means—variously described as the action of God or of the Holy Spirit, and called grace.

In contemplative practice, the role of silence is expressed by the Fr. David Bird, OSB, (Order of St. Benedict): "When both our interior and exterior are quiet, God will do the rest."

=== Cistercian ===
Cistercian monastics promote contemplative meditation. Part of the emphasis is on achieving spiritual ascent, but monastic silence also functions to avoid sin.

Although speech is morally neutral per se, the Epistle of James (3:1–12) and writers of the monastic tradition see silence as the only effective means of neutralizing a tendency towards sins of the tongue. There is an ongoing dialogue between Benedictine and Cistercian which speaks of a "monastic archetype" characterized by peace and silence.

=== Trappist ===
A Trappist’s commitment to silence is a monastic value that assures solitude in community. It fosters mindfulness of God and fraternal communion. It opens the mind to the inspirations of the Holy Spirit and favours attentiveness of the heart and solitary prayer to God. Early monastic communities evolved simple hand signing for essential communications. Spoken conversations between monks are permitted, but limited according to the norms established by the community and approved by the Order.

"Silence is the mystery of the world to come. Speech is the organ of this present world. More than all things love silence: it brings you a fruit that the tongue cannot describe. In the beginning we have to force ourselves to be silent. But then from our very silence is born something that draws us into deeper silence. May God give you an experience of this 'something' that is born of silence. If you practice this, inexpressible light will dawn upon you."

— Isaac of Nineveh

=== Protestantism ===
Baptist pastor and evangelist Frederick Brotherton Meyer (1847–1929), a member of the Higher Life movement, developed a strong commitment to silence, which he saw as one of the ways to gain access to God's guidance on all matters.

"We must be still before God. The life around us, in this age, is pre-eminently one of rush and effort. It is the age of the express train and electric telegraph. Years are crowded into months and weeks into days. This feverish haste threatens religious life. The stream has already entered our churches and stirred their quiet pools. Meetings crowd on meetings. The same energetic souls are found at them all and engaged in many good works besides. But we must beware that we do not substitute the active for the contemplative, the valley for the mountain top.... We must make time to be alone with God. The closet and the shut door are indispensable.... Be still, and know that God is within thee and around! In the hush of the soul the unseen becomes visible, and the eternally real.... Let no day pass without its season of silent waiting before God."

— F.B. Meyer, The Secret of Guidance

Meyer influenced Frank Buchman (1878–1961), originally a Protestant evangelist who founded the Oxford Group (known as Moral Re-Armament from 1938 until 2001, and as Initiatives of Change since then). Foundational to Buchman's spirituality was the practice of a daily "quiet time" during which, he claimed, anyone could search for, and receive, divine guidance on every aspect of their life. Dr Karl Wick, editor of the Swiss Catholic daily Vaterland, wrote that Buchman had "brought silence out of the monastery into the home, the marketplace, and the board room." Buchman, in turn, taught thousands to "listen and obey", finding resonance with non-Christian as well as Christian religions.

Quaker silent worship is a form of church service that utilizes infrequently-broken congregational silence rather than sermons, singing, or spoken prayer. Quakers gather together in "expectant waiting upon God" to experience his still small voice leading them from within.

== Silence practice in Judaism ==
Judaism has a tradition of silence in sacred space and in sacred structures. Although technically not classified as monasteries, synagogues, yeshivas, and beit midrash (house of study) are the models, along with the Tanakh (Bible), upon which the monastic silence tradition are built.

Rabbi Shmuel Afek starts minyan with five minutes of silence during which each person can engage in his or her own personal preparation for tefillah. Isadore Twersky states in Introduction to the Code of Maimonides: "One must be attuned to the silences".

Judaism also teaches that the Ten Commandments were given to the Jews in complete silence and that if you want to encounter God, you need to experience silence.

== Merton: bridging contemplative traditions ==
One of the leading exponents of monastic contemplative awareness is Thomas Merton.

From Thoughts in Solitude (1956)
According to Merton, silence represents a form of transcending paradoxes such as he may have encountered in zazen training.

"Contradictions have always existed in the soul of [individuals]. But it is only when we prefer analysis to silence that they become a constant and insoluble problem. We are not meant to resolve all contradictions but to live with them and rise above them and see them in the light of exterior and objective values which make them trivial by comparison."

— Thomas Merton, Thoughts in Solitude, part two, passage III

The Asian Journal

"I am able to approach the Buddhas barefoot and undisturbed, my feet in wet grass, wet sand. Then the silence of the extraordinary faces. Great smiles. Huge and yet subtle. Filled with every possibility, questioning nothing, knowing everything, rejecting nothing, the peace not of emotional resignation but of Madhyamika, of sunyata, that has seen through every question without trying to discredit anyone or anything — without refutation — without establishing some other argument. For the doctrinaire, the mind that needs well-established positions, such peace, such silence, can be frightening."

— Thomas Merton, The Asian Journal, page 282

Monastic life

"The chief function of monastic silence is then to preserve that memoria Dei which is much more than just 'memory'. It is a total consciousness and awareness of God which is impossible without silence, recollection, solitude and a certain withdrawal."

— Thomas Merton, Monastic Life

Contemplative silence as protest
In addition to being a major figure in the field of contemplative studies, Merton expressed awareness of social issues and conscience.

"I make monastic silence a protest against the lies of politicians, propagandists and agitators..."

— Thomas Merton, In My Own Words

== East-West concurrence on role of silent practice ==
Monastic silence is a category of practice which unites faiths and contributes a perennial topic of convergence between eastern and western traditions. Father Thomas Keating is the founder of Contemplative Outreach and former abbot of St. Benedict's Monastery in Snowmass, Colorado.

Keating's approach is more directly influenced by his collaboration with Buddhists from various traditions, whereas Main is influenced by his travels among Indian Hindus. Keating states that one "progresses eventually to Christ nature or Buddha nature" Keating distinguishes his contemplative method from that of John Main, another teacher of Christian mindfulness, but states an affinity for "interior silence". "The John Main approach is a little different than ours, but both go in the same direction: moving beyond dependence on concepts and words to a direct encounter with God on the level of faith and interior silence."

Fr. James Conner, OCSO wrote about the Fifth Christian–Buddhist Contemplative Conference held at the Naropa Institute in which ordained practitioners from Zen, Vajrayana, and Catholic monastic lineages conducted meditation and discussion. According to Conner, wordless prayer is designed to transcend rational processes to allow perception of an exalted state. "Zen says that Buddha-nature begins where the rational level ends. The same is taught in Christianity. One is to practice thoughtless, wordless prayer and thus perceive the divine presence."

== Application of monastic silence practice outside of religious context ==
The spiritual practice of silence has been extended into the healthcare setting under the rubric of Mind-Body healing.

Dr. Jack Engler of the Theravada tradition of Buddhism is Director of the Schiff Psychiatric Center at Harvard University and participates in Christian–Buddhist dialogue. Dr Engller lived as a novice at the Abbey of Gethsemane, which is affiliated with Merton, and studied Buddhist meditation practices in Burma and India.

Ludwig Wittgenstein, in his Tractatus Logico-Philosophicus, recommended silence to philosophers who were tempted to overextend their reach: "Whereof one cannot speak, thereof one must be silent."

Some common proverbs counsel silence, for example:

- It is better to remain silent at the risk of being thought a fool, than to talk and remove all doubt of it.
- If you can't say something nice, don't say anything at all.
- You have the right to remain silent. Anything you say can be used against you in court.

== See also ==
- Acedia (accidie), noted as a problem of solitary life
- Bodhi
- Christian contemplation
- Christian meditation
- John Chrysostom
- Church Fathers
- Dark Night of the Soul
- Hesychasm
- Hesychia
- Meditation
- Mindfulness (psychology)
- Mysticism
- David Steindl-Rast
- Sunyata
- Unprogrammed worship
- Vipassanā
