= Scoil Mhuire, Buncrana =

Secondary school in County Donegal, Ireland

Scoil Mhuire Buncrana

Location
- St. Oran’s Road, Buncrana, County Donegal; Ireland; 55.1312°N 7.4581°W

Information
- Type: Secondary school
- Motto: Misericordia (Mercy)
- Religious affiliation: Roman Catholic
- Established: 1933
- Founder: Sisters of Mercy
- Principal: Evelyn McLoughlin
- Enrollment: Around 650
- Language: English
- Colours: Royal blue and navy blue
- Website: scoilmhuirebuncrana.ie

Scoil Mhuire, Buncrana is a co-educational voluntary Catholic secondary school, located in Buncrana in County Donegal, Ireland. The school was founded by the Sisters of Mercy in 1933 and continues to have a Catholic ethos under the trusteeship of the Catholic Education an Irish Schools Trust (CEIST). It had 788 students in 2021.

The school's current principal teacher is Rosaleen Grant.

== History ==
Scoil Mhuire was established in 1933 initially as a female post-primary school under the patronage of the Sisters of Mercy. The sisters had already purchased Rockfort House, a large detached country house and land. This house was of early nineteenth-century date that was the seat of the Stewart\Stuart family. This site remains the location of Scoil Mhuire to date.

The sisters used Rockfort house both as a convent and as a school. This included a boarding school for students from rural areas considered too far away for daily travel. As both the numbers of pupils and Sisters of Mercy grew, Rockfort House became too small. The decision was made to build a new purpose-built convent. It was designed by Dublin architect Simon Aloysius Leonard. The foundation stone was laid on 2 February 1952, and the sisters moved into the new building on 23 September 1953. The original building, Rockfort House, became the Boarding School.

In 1966, the then Minister for Education Donogh O'Malley, announced that from 1969 all children would be entitled to free education. The decision was therefore made by the Sisters of Mercy for Scoil Mhuire to become co-educational, teaching both girls and boys. With this expansion came the need for a larger school building. The new building was opened in 1973. The school stopped taking in boarders and the original Rockfort House was knocked down to make way for a new extension in the early 1990s.

The Sisters of Mercy closed their convent in 2012 and the convent building was subsequently converted to teaching space.

In 2020 it was announced by the then Minister for Education, Joe McHugh, that substantial new building works had been approved by the Department of Education. This will include three science labs with preparation areas, two mainstream classrooms, two special education teaching rooms.

== Notable former pupils ==
- Grainne Gallanagh, Irish model, Miss Universe Ireland 2018. Participant in Dancing with the Stars 2020.
- Claire Irwin, Quantity Surveyor on Room to Improve, the architectural renovation TV series broadcast on theRTÉ One.
- John Maguire, Director of International Relations and Cooperation of France Médias Monde and a member of the Executive Board of the Association for International Broadcasting. He is a former Paris correspondent for RTÉ and The Irish Times.
- Killian McLaughlin, Zoologist, Conservationist and Lawyer. Known in the media as ‘The Bearman of Buncrana’.
- Mark Timlin, association footballer with Derry City and Finn Harps.
