= Presentation College Headford =

Coordinates: 53.468488°N 9.1111°W

- Headford; Ireland

Information
- Type: Secondary school
- Established: 1942
- School district: County Galway
- Principal: Orla Jackson
- Enrollment: 850
- Colours: Navy (Junior level), Grey (senior level), with black shoes and navy trousers
- Athletics: Gaelic football, soccer, rugby union, basketball, golf
- Affiliation: CEIST Catholic Education an Irish Schools Trust
- Website: www.presheadford.ie

Presentation College Headford is a secondary school for boys and girls in Headford, County Galway in Ireland. The school serves the town of Headford and its hinterland. It is partnered with Dundonald High School, Belfast, in Northern Ireland.

== History ==
The college was founded by the Presentation Sisters in 1942. It initially started in a disused army hut behind the presbytery. In 2017, it celebrated 75 years operation.

In 2007, the college began operating under the trusteeship of CEIST Catholic Education an Irish Schools Trust.

On Easter Monday 2023, 14-year-old students Lukas Joyce and Kirsty Bohan died in a car crash.

Mayo all-Ireland Gaelic football Champion Tommy Conroy works at the School

== Infrastructure ==
A large school gym was built in the late 1980s at a cost of £64,000 which accommodates physical education classes, theatrical acts, and other events.

The school building is antiquated and the corridors are narrow. A new school building was built in 2010, and it houses a number of classrooms and a hall in which students can study or eat at lunch. It is also home to a state of the art table tennis hall.

There is a school canteen on campus which can seat 300 students, and employs five staff.
