= Mercy College, Sligo =

Location
- Chapel Hill; Sligo, County Sligo; Ireland

Information
- Type: Voluntary secondary school
- Established: 1846; 180 years ago
- Principal: Anne Marie Gorby
- Teaching staff: 40
- Gender: Female
- Enrollment: 525
- Colour
- Website: mercycollegesligo.ie

Mercy College is an all-girls Catholic voluntary Secondary School in Sligo with a co-educational Aonad under the trusteeship of CEIST.

== History ==
The school traces its origins to 1846 when members of the order of Sisters of Mercy came to Sligo. In 1849, they established Scoil Phadraig Naofa which grew rapidly in numbers. Out of this school grew the Mercy College. Over the years new buildings and sports facilities have been added.

== Irish language ==
The Aonad Loch Gile is an all-Irish stream within the college. This stream is for girls and boys.

== Notable alumni ==
- Tara Burns - judge
- Maisie McDaniel (1939-2008) - country and showband singer
