= St. Joseph's Secondary School, Rush =

St. Joseph's School Rush

Location
- Convent Ln, Rush, County Dublin; Ireland; 53.521303°N 6.090623°W

Information
- Type: Mixed (DEIS School)
- Religious affiliation: Roman Catholic
- Established: 1961 (Sisters of Mercy)
- Principal: Darragh Nealon
- Enrollment: 920
- Organisation: CEIST school
- Website: stjosephsrush.ie

St. Joseph's School, Rush is a secondary school in Rush, County Dublin, Ireland.

== Alumni ==
- Richard Chambers – journalist and author
- Linda Djougang – rugby player
- Robert O'Donoghue – politician
- Isibeal Atkinson – footballer
