= Coláiste Bríde, Enniscorthy =

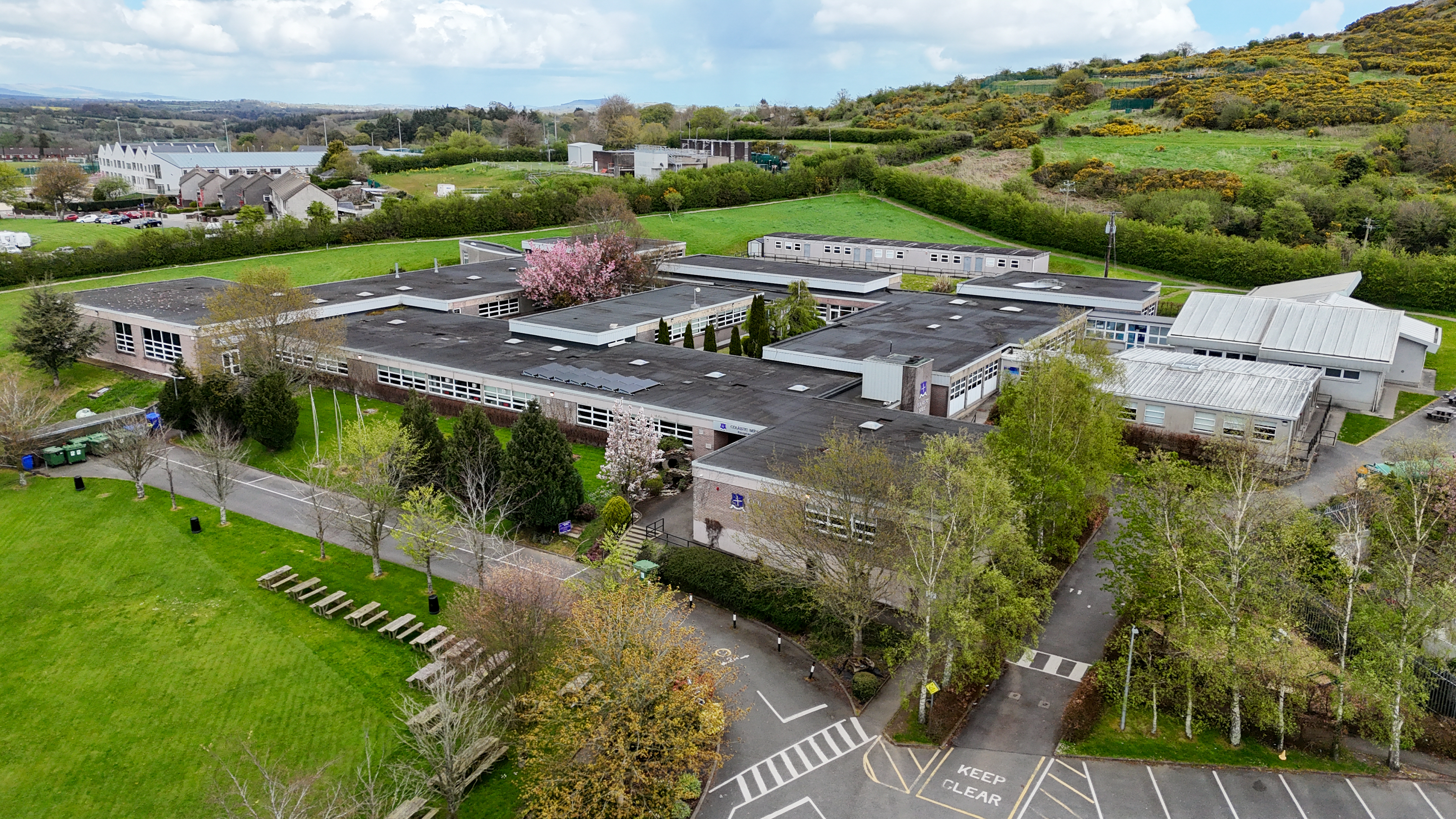

Location
- Enniscorthy, County Wexford; Ireland; 52.5028°N 6.5590°W

Information
- Principal: Kiera O'Sullivan
- Enrollment: 742
- Website: www.colaistebride.ie

Coláiste Bríde, Enniscorthy is a girls Voluntary Catholic Secondary School located in County Wexford. Coláiste Bríde was founded by the Sisters of Mercy and operates under the Trusteeship of CEIST.

== History ==
Coláiste Bríde was founded by the Sisters of Mercy who arrived in Enniscorthy in 1859 to open a convent to meet the needs of the poor. In 1860 two rooms were procured and classes for children and adults commenced. Recognising the necessity for training the young, in 1882 the nuns opened a workroom where they taught knitting, shirt making and associated crafts.

In 1935, the sisters built Secondary Top, a building to house the second level pupils, under the direction of Sr. Catherine Bolger. In 1970, the Secondary Top was upgraded to full secondary status with the opening of phase one of the present Coláiste Bríde. The second phase was opened in 1978. 5.

In 2007, the school began operating under the trusteeship of Catholic Education an Irish Schools Trust (CEIST).

== Facilities ==
The facilities include a canteen, sports hall, library, science labs, home economics kitchens, IT labs, art rooms, music room, a well-being area and football pitch.

== Events ==
The school holds an annual positive mental health week known as "I am Worth it". The school also runs events to promote literacy as part of the Well Read Initiative.

== Alumni ==
- Ann Skelly (b. 1996) - actress
