= Our Lady's College, Greenhills =

Location
- Greenhills, County Louth; Ireland; 53.71999°N 6.32698°W

Information
- Motto: Latin: Pro fide et moribus
- Established: 1940
- Staff: 109
- Religious order: Presentation Sisters
- Website: ourladys.ie

Our Lady's College, Greenhills is a Roman Catholic all-girls college located in Greenhills, Drogheda, County Louth, in the Republic of Ireland. The College is run under the auspices of the Presentation Sisters.

== History ==
The school was founded in 1940 by the Presentation Sisters. The present building was opened in 1964 with the financial assistance of Cardinal Cushing, who was the Archbishop of Boston at the time.

In 1986 control of the school was passed to a Board of Management, and in 2008 to CEIST Catholic Education an Irish Schools Trust. However, Our Lady's retains its cultural and historical links with the network of Presentation Sisters schools in Ireland and around the world.

== Notable students ==
- Evanna Lynch - Actress
