= Mount St. Michaels =

All-girls secondary school in Claremorris, Ireland

Coordinates: 53.732°N 9.001°W

Mount St. Michael Secondary School is an all-girls voluntary secondary school, under the trusteeship of the Catholic Education an Irish Schools Trust (CEIST), on the outskirts of Claremorris in County Mayo, Ireland. Located on what was the estate of Denis Browne (local landlord), it was founded in 1906 and began as a 'Secondary Top' in 1924. It developed into a full secondary school in 1940.

Until 2000, the school accommodated both residential and day pupils. Boarders were first admitted in 1906 and the annual intake numbered 15 between 1906 and 1940. This number increased to 90 until 1996 when the phasing out of the boarding school began. The 1999-2000 academic year was the final year in which the school accommodated boarding (residential) students. As of 2018, school had an enrollment of approximately 450 students.

In 1987, a board of management was set up, comprising representatives of trustees, teachers and parents. In 1990 a lay principal was appointed.

Mount St. Michael operates a 6-year program covering the Junior Cycle and Senior (Leaving Certificate) Cycle.

In 2023, the school became the first school in Ireland to be funded by the mdeducation foundation for student well-being. The three-year project was aimed at the 200 Senior Cycle students.

In 2024, pupils from the school won six out of seven prizes at the BT Young Scientist Exhibition.
