= Mercy College (Dublin) =

Secondary school for girls in Coolock, Dublin, Ireland

Coordinates: 53.38604°N 6.19812°W

Coolock House

Mercy College Coolock is a Catholic girls' secondary school in Coolock, Dublin, Ireland. It was founded in 1963 by the Sisters of Mercy. It shares grounds with Coolock House, formerly the home of Catherine McAuley, founder of the Sisters of Mercy, and with Scoil Chaitríona, a girls' primary school.
