= St Joseph's Secondary School, Castlebar =

Secondary school in County Mayo, Ireland

Coordinates: 53.85570°N 9.29120°W

Information
- Religious affiliation: Catholic
- Established: 1918; 108 years ago
- Gender: Girls
- Enrollment: c.600
- Website: https://www.stjosephscbar.ie

St. Joseph's Secondary School is an all girls voluntary Catholic secondary school, founded by the Sisters of Mercy in 1918. It is situated in Castlebar and is built on the historical grounds of the Lord Lucan estate.

St. Joseph's is under the trusteeship of CEIST Catholic Education an Irish Schools Trust It has over 600 students. The school aims to provide a holistic Christian Education in co-operation with teachers, students, parents, management and the community.

== See also ==
- Education in the Republic of Ireland
