= Ballina railway station =

Railway station in County Mayo, Ireland

Ballina Béal an Átha
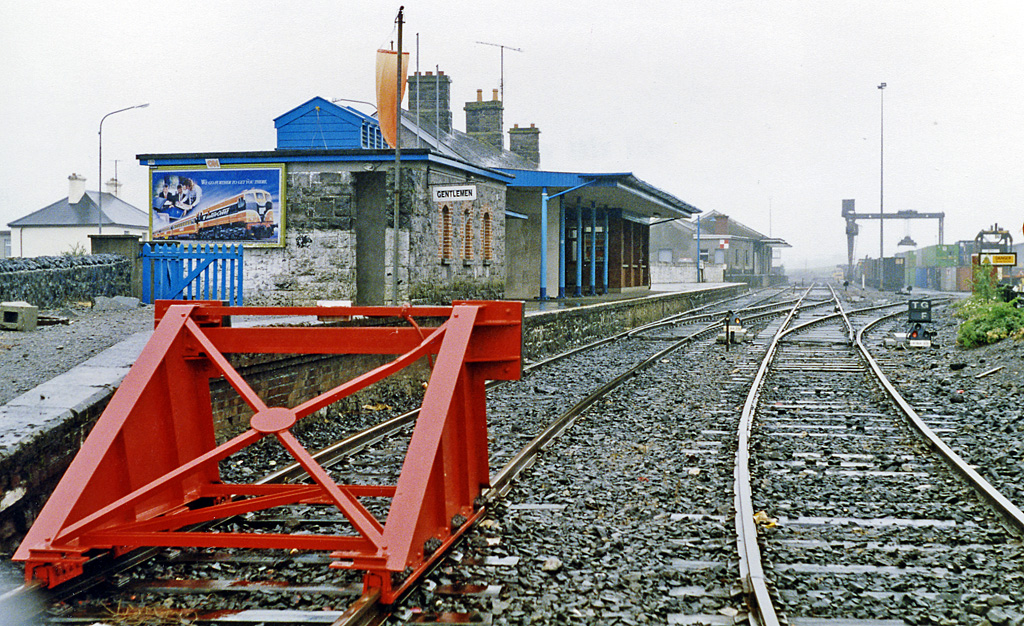
- Ballina Station in June 1993

General information
- Location: Station Road, Ballina, County Mayo, F26 EH76; Ireland
- Coordinates: 54°6′31″N 9°9′38″W
- Owner: Iarnród Éireann
- Operator: Iarnród Éireann
- Line: Ballina branch line
- Platforms: 1
- Bus operators: Bus Eireann; TFI Local Link
- Connections: 22; 52; 420; 421; 444; 445; 446; 451; 454 (BE); 454 (TFI); 455; 458

Construction
- Structure type: At-grade

History
- Opened: 19 May 1873
Location

Ballina railway station serves the town of Ballina in County Mayo, Ireland. The station is the terminus of the Ballina branch line.

Ballina is a single platform station with a runaround loop. Ballina Freight yard is beside the station. It is a major freight hub for Iarnród Éireann. Bulk (Timber) and other freight train movements go from the yard to Dublin and Waterford ports.

The railway station buildings have historical significance. The National Inventory of Architectural Heritage describe the station as "an integral component of the later nineteenth-century built heritage of Ballina on account of the connections with the continued development of the Mayo Branch of the Midland Great Western Railway."

== History ==
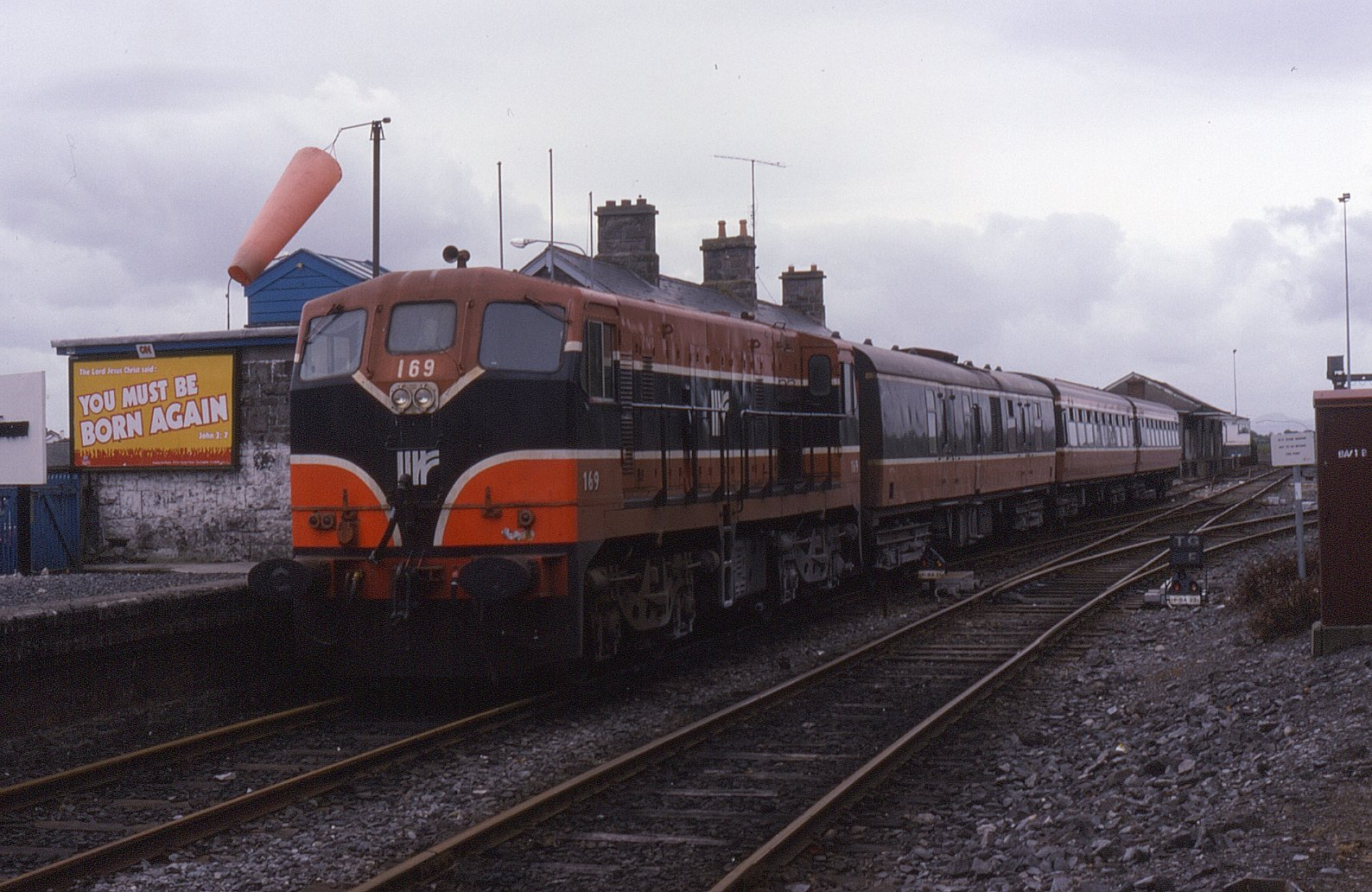
Locomotive-hauled train arriving at Ballina in June 1995

Ballina station opened on 19 May 1873, following the opening of the Manulla to Foxford line on 1 May 1868. It was built as part of Midland Great Western Railway and connected to the Westport line through a branch line from Manulla Junction.

A branch extension to Killala was first proposed under Balfour’s Light Railways Ireland Act 1889. This extension of the line to Killala was opened on 2 January 1893. Although it carried passengers and freight, the extension was never profitable. It was closed to passenger services on 1 October 1931, and to goods on 1 July 1934. After the track was lifted, Ballina again became the line's terminus.

The station established an economic connection between North Mayo and the wider world. In particular, it provided a hub for agricultural products. For example, in December 1910, the station transported 5,082 pigs, 511 cattle, 149 sheep and 28 horses. In 1920, the station reported that it transported almost 900 cases of eggs each week. Thousands of seasonal agricultural workers traveled from the station by rail to Dublin and then onto England to help with harvests. In the late 19th and early 20th centuries, the station served as a departure point for migrants leaving North Mayo. Large crowds of family members often gathered at the station before finally saying goodbye to those departing for America.

=== The Ballina Railway Station Robbery ===
The booking office was robbed in December 1906. The robbery occurred after a fair day when the booking office was known to be holding a large amount of cash and cheques. A safe weighing 1.5 CWTS and containing £127 was carried away. It was subsequently found nearby along with a blacksmiths' sledge and an iron pin. The contents of the safe were gone. The thieves entered the building via a window looking out towards the public road. A few days earlier, a car had crashed into the building and smashed the window. It was subsequently repaired with a wooden shutter, which the thieves had removed with a crowbar.

A few days later, two former residents of the town - Dennis Callaghan and James McGinty - were arrested in a boarding house in Bridge Street, Derry with a large amount of money, which was traced back to Ballina station. Despite pleading not guilty both men were convicted. Callaghan, who had previous convictions, was sentenced to five years penal servitude, while McGinty received eighteen months.

=== War of Independence ===
A group of armed men raided the station in July 1920. They held up the night watchman at gunpoint and stole a number of steel shutters consigned for the protection of a number of Royal Irish Constabulary stations.

=== Irish Civil War ===
In February 1923, National Army soldiers arrested two young women - Miss Jeanie McInerney and Miss Moore - at the station as they tried to board a train for Dublin. Both women were described as "organizers for the anti-Treaty party". When they were captured, they were found to be holding a number of "important dispatches" and a large amount of cash.

=== Second World War ===
During the second world war, the station served as a focal point for the supply of turf to Dublin. In 1942, the Mayo County Council reported that station received daily deliveries of up to 40 trucks of fuel for supply to the capital.

=== Upgrades and Changes ===
The station once had two platforms and an MGWR signal cabin, but in 1977 the cabin as well as the second platform was demolished to make for the expansion of freight facilities and a new modern signal cabin was opened. The station was upgraded in 1996, at a cost of £100,000. In 2019, Irish Rail announced that €1 million will be spent on the freight yard. The investment would renew the railway tracks used in the freight yard.

In September 2020 Iarnród Éireann established new 5am train service between Ballina and Manulla Junction. This service will link up with the early morning train from Westport to Dublin.

=== 150th Anniversary ===
On 23 May 2023, Ballina Station marked its 150th anniversary. The celebration was attended by Dara Calleary TD, the Minister of State for Trade Promotion, Digital and Company Regulation, along with Cllr Mark Duffy, the Cathaoirleach of Ballina Municipal District, and Seamus Weir, the Mayo County Council Cathaoirleach. Also present were Matthew Garrett, the Station Manager of Ballina Station, as well as former Station Managers Tommy May and Pat Hopkins. The event included activities such as cutting a commemorative cake and speeches to acknowledge the station's long history and its significance in the community.

== Accidents and incidents ==
- In August 1876, a railway porter called Coppenger was assisting in the removal of a train from into the shed. He fell from one of the carriage steps and was caught between the platform and the train. He was dragged along the platform for around 12 yards before the engine could be stopped. He was taken to Ballina workhouse hospital for treatment.
- In May 1877, a mother and a child were hit by a mail train near the station. The child had walked onto the track, and the mother rushed forward to snatch her from the oncoming train. Both were hit, with the mother dying instantly, and the child shortly afterwards. A subsequent inquest returned a verdict of accidental death.
- A farmer called Michael McHale from Garracloon County Mayo was accidentally killed at the station in the evening of Friday, 2 December 1904. He was crossing the line at the station when a train shunted backwards catching the man between the footboard and the platform. He was extricated as soon as possible but died shortly afterwards.
- In November 1956, at the Ballina Circuit Court, a railway porter working at the station named Daniel Smith sought total incapacity compensation due to an injury to his left foot caused by a heavy case dropping on it. Smith claimed that his heart condition, mitral stenosis, had worsened as a result of the accident. After considering the evidence, the judge concluded that Smith was still totally incapacitated due to the foot injury but ruled that the heart incapacity was not attributable to the accident. Smith was awarded compensation for the foot injury but not for the heart condition.
- On 29 December 1974 a special holiday train derailed at Ballina Railway Station. According to a spokesperson from C.I.E., the track points malfunctioned, causing two carriages to veer off the track. There were no passengers on board the train, and normal services were not affected.

== See also ==
- List of railway stations in Ireland

Ballina railway station

Preceding station	Iarnród Éireann	Following station
Foxford	Commuter; Ballina Branch Line	Terminus
Foxford	InterCity; Dublin–Westport/Galway railway line	Terminus
