= St Joseph's Secondary School, Navan =

St. Joseph's Mercy Secondary School
- Scoil Trócaire Naomh Iósaf
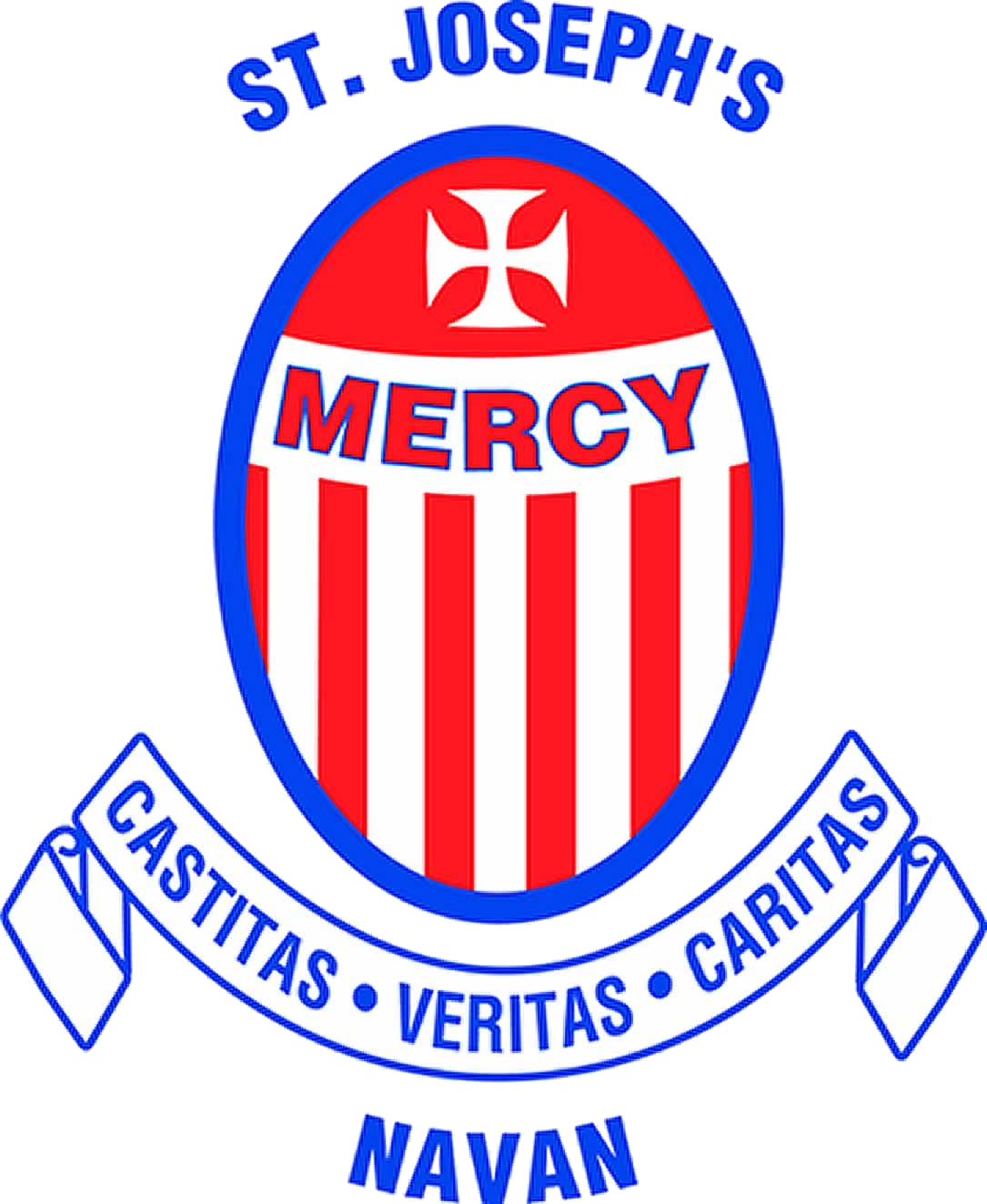

Location
- Navan, County Meath; Ireland; 53.6504°N 6.6886°W

Information
- Motto: Castitas, veritas, caritas. (Latin for "Chastity, truth, charity.")
- Denomination: Roman Catholic
- Founded: 1853; 173 years ago
- Principal: Mr McCormack
- Enrollment: c. 700
- Religious Order: Sisters of Mercy
- Website: www.mercynavan.ie

St. Joseph's Secondary School is a Catholic, all-girls school in Navan, Ireland. It serves both the town and a large catchment area. The school is situated close to Railway Street and shares part of its grounds with St. Joseph's Primary School. It was founded by the Sisters of Mercy.

== History ==
In 1925, the school was registered as a secondary school with the approval of the Department of Education. Many of the students educated at St. Joseph’s from the 1920s onwards entered Teacher Training Colleges or University or went on to work in the Civil Service. During the 1960s, it became increasingly evident that a new school would have to be built as student numbers continued to grow. In an effort to support the work of the Sisters, a Parents Association was formed to raise funds for the building project. A government grant was made available and in 1969 the main block of St. Joseph’s Secondary School, as we know it, was officially opened.

In 2007, the school began operating under the trusteeship of CEIST Catholic Education an Irish Schools Trust.

== Alumni ==
- Helen McEntee (b. 1986) - Fine Gael politician; Minister for Justice (2020-2025)
