= Westport railway station (Ireland) =

Railway station

Westport Cathair na Mart
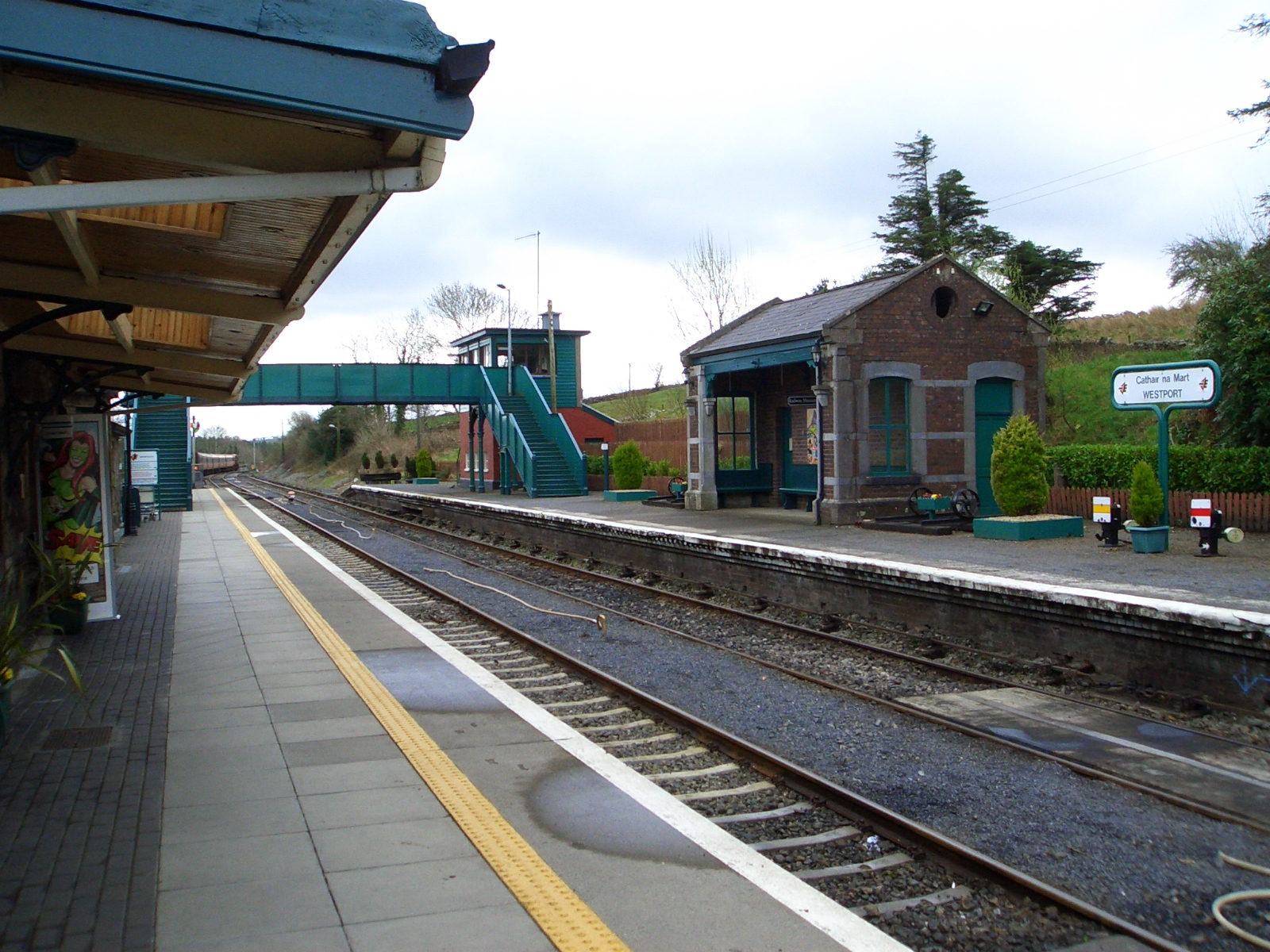
- A view of Westport station

General information
- Location: Altamount St, Knockranny; Westport, County Mayo, F28 XY18; Ireland
- Coordinates: 53.7955°N 9.50885°W
- Owner: Iarnród Éireann
- Operator: Iarnród Éireann
- Platforms: 2
- Bus operators: Bus Éireann
- Connections: 423

Construction
- Structure type: At-grade

Other information
- Station code: WPORT
- Fare zone: P

History
- Opened: 28 January 1866
Location

Westport railway station serves the town of Westport, County Mayo, Ireland.

The station is the terminus station on the Dublin to Westport Rail service. Passengers to or from Galway must travel to Athlone and change trains. Passengers to or from Ballina and Foxford must travel to Manulla Junction and change trains.

== History ==
The station was opened as Westport Town on 28 January 1866 by the Midland Great Western Railway (MGWR). A branch line to Achill was opened in February 1894 as far as Newport and in May 1895 in its full length, but was already closed on 1 October 1937. Regular freight traffic to Westport ceased on 6 September 1976. An extension of the line from Dublin to Westport Quay was opened by the MGWR in 1875. It closed to regular passenger traffic in 1912 and to regular freight traffic in 1941, but was used by occasional goods trains until 1977 before being finally closed in 1978. It was dismantled about ten years later, with the Quay station obliterated under a new housing development. Most of the route to the town remains as a cycleway.

== Services ==
The typical current service pattern is:

- 5 trains per day to Dublin Heuston

Preceding station	Iarnród Éireann	Following station
Castlebar	Intercity; Dublin–Westport/Galway railway line	Terminus
