= Leinster Schools Rugby Senior League =

Rugby union competition in Ireland

- Sport: Rugby union
- Founded: 1996
- No. of teams: 15
- Most recent champion: Wesley College

The Leinster Schools Rugby Senior League is a rugby union competition for secondary schools affiliated to the Leinster Branch of the IRFU. It is played before Christmas, after which the Leinster Schools Rugby Senior Cup is played. It is a 15 school competition played by the strongest schools outside of the "Big Six”. The so-called "Big Six" of Leinster schools rugby (Blackrock College, Clongowes Wood College, St Mary's College, Dublin, Terenure College, Belvedere College and St Michael's College, Dublin) do not participate in the competition, although St Michael's College, Dublin used to participate in the competition winning it in 1998. For the most part it is participated in by mostly private schools but 4 public schools participate in it as well. Schools in the league often provide the biggest form of competition to the "Big Six" in the Leinster Schools Rugby Senior Cup. Schools that participated in the league, outside of the "Big Six" that has gone to win the Leinster Schools Rugby Senior Cup: Cistercian College, Roscrea (2015) against Belvedere College, Newbridge College (2020, shared with Clongowes Wood College due to COVID-19 pandemic) and Gonzaga College (2023) against Blackrock College.

== Winners ==
Year	Winner	Runner-up
1994	Castleknock College	
1995	Cistercian College, Roscrea	
1996	Newbridge College	
1997	The King's Hospital	
1998	St. Michael's College	
1999	St. Andrew's College	Gonzaga College
2000	Wesley College	
2001	Castleknock College	
2002	Cistercian College, Roscrea	C.B.C Monkstown
2003	Templeogue College	
2004	The King's Hospital	C.B.C Monkstown
2005	Gonzaga College	St. Gerard's School
2006	Cistercian College, Roscrea	Gonzaga College
2007	Gonzaga College	
2008	C.B.C Monkstown	
2009	St. Gerard's School	
2010	St. Gerard's School	
2011	St. Gerard's School	
2012	Kilkenny College	Castleknock College
2013	Newbridge College	Cistercian College, Roscrea
2014	Newbridge College	Cistercian College, Roscrea
2015	Cistercian College, Roscrea	
2016	Gonzaga College	Cistercian College, Roscrea
2017	St. Gerard's School	Gonzaga College
2018	Gonzaga College	Castleknock College
2019	Gonzaga College	Cistercian College, Roscrea
2020	No competition due to COVID-19 Pandemic	
2021	Gonzaga College	Kilkenny College
2022	Gonzaga College	Newbridge College
2023	Gonzaga College	Newbridge College
2024	Gonzaga College	Newbridge College
2025	Wesley College	Newbridge College

- School with the most titles: Gonzaga College (9 titles)
- Most straight titles in a row: Gonzaga College, 6 titles in a row.
