= Leinster Schools Junior Cup =

Under-age rugby union competition

The Leinster Schools Junior Challenge Cup is an under-age rugby union competition for schools affiliated to the Leinster Branch of the IRFU.

== Background ==
Leinster Schools Rugby Junior Cup
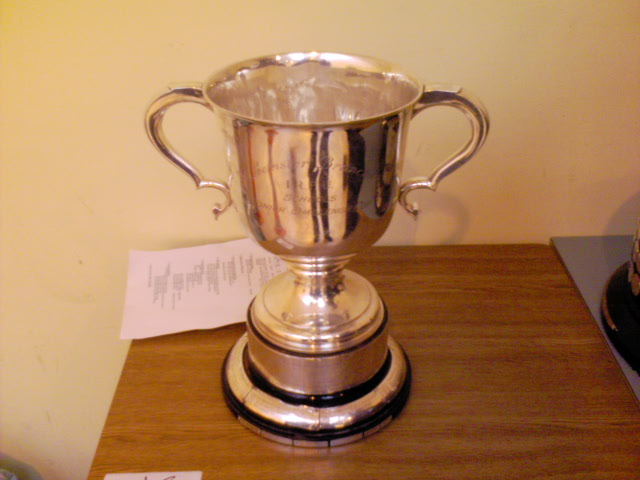
- The Leinster Schools Junior Cup
- Sport: Rugby union
- Founded: 1909
- Organising body: Leinster Rugby
- No. of teams: 16
- Most recent champion: St Michael's College
- Most titles: Blackrock College (53 titles)

The Leinster Schools Junior Cup competition is confined to students under the age of 16. The competition is held every year between January and March, with the final in late March.

The first recorded Junior Cup was held in 1909 where St. Andrew's College edged out Belvedere to take the "inaugural" cup.

In recent years the competition has been dominated by Blackrock College and St. Michael's College, who from 2011 to 2020 had a stranglehold on the trophy. Though Newbridge College have begun to emerge as Junior Cup contenders in recent years, sharing the cup with Blackrock in 2020 and beating them in the final in the delayed 2021 edition of the tournament. Only 12 different schools have lifted the Junior Cup, compared to the Senior Cup where 17 different schools have won the title.

== Records ==
Blackrock College have the most victories (53), followed by Belvedere College (17) with Terenure College the next best (10). Despite the domination of the rugby schools the Cup is much less prone to "runs" of victories by a single school, the longest being Belvedere's 4 (1916–1919) and Blackrock's 4s (1979–1982) and (2013–2016). Castleknock College dominated the competition in the 1920s, winning 6 titles including their three-in-a-row (1920–1922).

Only six schools have achieved the Senior and Junior Cup double. These are Blackrock, who have achieved this feat 26 times (1910, 1912, 1927, 1933, 1935–36, 1942–43, 1945, 1948, 1953–54, 1956–57, 1962, 1964, 1981–82, 1986–87, 1995, 2004, 2006, 2013–14, 2018), St Michaels twice (2012 and 2019), Newbridge College (2020), Belvedere (2005), Terenure (1958) and Castleknock (1920). Since the Junior Cup records began, only the decade of the 1970s did not produce a double.

On only twelve occasions schools have contested and lost both the Senior and Junior Cup Finals in the same year: Terenure College in four years (1957, 1964, 1969 & 1987), followed by Belvedere College with 3 (1930, 1944 & 1962), next Blackrock College (2017), St. Michael's College (2010), St Mary's College (1943), Newbridge College (1939) and Cistercian College Roscrea (1910) with 1 each. Blackrock College had never been beaten in both finals in the same year until 2017.

Blackrock College have only been defeated in successive finals on three occasions. In the 1919/20 they were runners up two times in a row, defeated by Belvedere in 1919 followed by a walkover by Castleknock in 1920. The second occasion was thirty years later in 1949/50 when they were defeated in successive finals by Clongowes Wood College and Newbridge College respectively. The third and last occasion was when Blackrock College were beaten in successive finals (three times in a row) by Terenure College in 1976, 1977 and 1978.

During the 16 years from 1975 to 1990 the Junior Cup was won by only three different schools. Blackrock College with 7 wins, Terenure College with 5 wins and Presentation College Bray with 4 wins.

In the 1971 JCT final, St Mary's College defeated Terenure College 6-5 in a replay, following an earlier 3-3 draw. St Mary's scored two penalties, and Terenure College scored a converted try, which at the time earned 5 points (3 plus 2 for a conversion).

In the 1977 JCT Final at Lansdowne Road, Terenure were trailing Blackrock by 10 points to 9 points at the end of full time when they were awarded a penalty inside their own half, directly in front of the posts. Their out-half converted the 60 yards (55 metre) penalty to win the cup.

The 1988 final was the third and last time that no Dublin-based school was represented in the final (Pres Bray V Clongowes). The other two occasions were 1939 (Roscrea V Newbridge) and 1947 (Clongowes V Newbridge).

St Michael's has the distinction of being runners-up in five finals in a row (2007-2011), losing to two Terenure sides back to back (2009 and 2010). St Michael's were eventual winners in the 6th final in a row in which they had participated, in 2012.

In 2018 St Mary's College once again lost a JCT final to Blackrock College. St Mary's College have never managed to defeat Blackrock College in either a JCT or SCT final, losing out on four occasions in both competitions.

In 2020 the final between Newbridge College and Blackrock College was not played due to the COVID-19 outbreak. The IRFU declared the titled shared for the first time and as a result Newbridge won the Double as they also shared the Senior title.

In 2021 the competition was delayed until September due to the ongoing COVID-19 outbreak. Newbridge College triumphed over Blackrock College in the final 19-15, winning their 3rd ever Junior Cup.

In 2022 the competition resumed its normal schedule. Cistercian College Roscrea made their first Junior Cup Final in 82 years (last appearance was 1940). They lost out to St. Michael's College 26-19.

In 2023 both semi-finals ended in draws and were replayed. In the replays, Blackrock College beat Terenure College 11-7 and St Michaels College beat Belvedere College 22-14. Blackrock and St Michaels then went on to play one of the highest standard matches the jct had ever seen with Blackrock prevailing in the end.

In 2024 St Mary's College beat Terenure College 10-8, winning their 7th Junior Cup and first Junior Cup title in 27 years.

In 2025 Castleknock College reached their first Junior Cup Final in 23 years by beating a fancied Blackrock College side by 15-14 in the semi final. Their last JCT Cup win of their 8 to date was 59 years ago in 1966. The final was won by St Michael's College in an emphatic fashion by a record score of 72 points to nil.

In 2026 St Michael's won their 5th JCT title in the last 10 years. This their 8th win in total, moves them up a notch above Castleknock College also on 8 wins and closing in on Terenure College who are positioned 3rd overall with 10 wins.

== Performance by school ==
School	Titles	Winning years
Blackrock College	53	1910-11-12, 1923, 1927, 1932–33, 1935–36, 1941-42-43, 1945–46, 1948, 1951, 1953–54, 1956–57, 1959, 1962, 1964–65, 1968-69-70, 1972–73, 1979-80-81-82, 1984, 1986–87, 1993, 1995, 1998, 2000–01, 2003–04, 2006–07, 2011, 2013-14-15-16, 2018, 2020 (Shared), 2023 SCT & JCT Double 26 times – 1910, 1912, 1927, 1933, 1935, 1936, 1942, 1943, 1945, 1948, 1953, 1954, 1956, 1957, 1962, 1964, 1981, 1982, 1986, 1987, 1995, 2004, 2006, 2013, 2014, 2018
Belvedere College	17	1913-14, 1916-17-18-19, 1925, 1929, 1931, 1937, 1940, 1960–61, 1994, 1996, 1999, 2005 (Double)
Terenure College	10	1955, 1958 (Double), 1967, 1976-77-78, 1983, 1989, 2009-10
St. Michael's College, Dublin	8	1991, 2002, 2012 (Double), 2017, 2019 (Double), 2022, 2025, 2026
Castleknock College	8	1915, 1920 (Double)-21-22, 1924, 1926, 1928, 1966
St. Mary's College	7	1934, 1963, 1971, 1974, 1992, 1997, 2024
Clongowes Wood College	5	1944, 1947, 1949, 1952, 2008
Presentation College, Bray	5	1930, 1975, 1985, 1988, 1990
Newbridge College	3	1950, 2020 (Shared & Double) , 2021
Cistercian College, Roscrea	1	1939
The High School	1	1938
St. Andrew's College, Dublin	1	1909

Note: This list is based on the information below which may be incomplete.

== Winners ==
=== 1900s ===
- 1909 St. Andrew's College beat Belvedere College 9-0

=== 1910s ===
- 1910 Blackrock College beat Cistercian College, Roscrea after a 0-0 draw 6-3
- 1911 Blackrock College beat Belvedere College 28-0
- 1912 Blackrock College beat St Andrews College 28-9
- 1913 Belvedere College beat Mount St Josephs Private Boarding School Clondalkin (Carmelites) after a 0-0 draw 3-0
- 1914 Belvedere College beat St Andrews College after a 3-3 draw 13-0
- 1915 Castleknock College beat The King's Hospital 27-0
- 1916 Belvedere College beat Kilkenny College after a 0-0 draw 5-0
- 1917 Belvedere College beat Blackrock College 5-3
- 1918 Belvedere College awarded Walkover against Castleknock College after three draws 3-3, 0-0, 0-0
- 1919 Belvedere College beat Blackrock College 16-3

=== 1920s ===
- 1920 Castleknock College awarded walkover against Blackrock College
- 1921 Castleknock College beat Pres Glasthule 46-0
- 1922 Castleknock College beat Belvedere College 6-3
- 1923 Blackrock College beat CUS 12-0
- 1924 Castleknock College beat Belvedere College 13-0
- 1925 Belvedere College beat Blackrock College 6-3
- 1926 Castleknock College beat CUS 9-0
- 1927 Blackrock College beat Masonic Boys School, Clonskeagh 12-0
- 1928 Castleknock College beat Blackrock College 3-0
- 1929 Belvedere College beat Newbridge College 6-0

=== 1930s ===
- 1930 Presentation College, Bray beat Belvedere College 14-6
- 1931 Belvedere College beat O'Connell School after two 0-0 draws, 3-0
- 1932 Blackrock College beat Belvedere College 17-3
- 1933 Blackrock College beat O'Connell School 6-3
- 1934 St. Mary's College beat Mountjoy School (now Mount Temple Comprehensive School) 6-0
- 1935 Blackrock College beat Belvedere College 10-8
- 1936 Blackrock College beat Castleknock College 12-6
- 1937 Belvedere College beat Castleknock College 3-0
- 1938 The High School beat Newbridge College 5-3
- 1939 Cistercian College, Roscrea beat Newbridge College after a 0-0 draw 9-0

=== 1940s ===
- 1940 Belvedere College beat Cistercian College, Roscrea 14-0
- 1941 Blackrock College beat Newbridge College 9-0
- 1942 Blackrock College beat Belvedere College 6-3
- 1943 Blackrock College beat St. Mary's College 5-3
- 1944 Clongowes Wood beat Belvedere College 13-3
- 1945 Blackrock College beat Clongowes Wood 3-0
- 1946 Blackrock College beat Castleknock College 6-0
- 1947 Clongowes Wood beat Newbridge College 19-5
- 1948 Blackrock College beat Clongowes Wood 13-0
- 1949 Clongowes Wood beat Blackrock College 9-0

=== 1950s ===
- 1950 Newbridge College beat Blackrock College 13-0
- 1951 Blackrock College beat CUS 14-3
- 1952 Clongowes Wood beat Blackrock College 5-3
- 1953 Blackrock College beat Castleknock College 6-0
- 1954 Blackrock College beat Castleknock College 6-0
- 1955 Terenure College beat Blackrock College 9-0
- 1956 Blackrock College beat Newbridge College 8-3
- 1957 Blackrock College beat Terenure College after a 0-0 draw 11-0
- 1958 Terenure College beat Blackrock College 13-9
- 1959 Blackrock College beat St. Mary's College 8-0

=== 1960s ===
- 1960 Belvedere College beat St Paul's College, Raheny 3-0
- 1961 Belvedere College beat Blackrock College 8-3
- 1962 Blackrock College beat Belvedere College 6-0
- 1963 St. Mary's College beat Castleknock College after a 3-3 draw 3-0
- 1964 Blackrock College beat Terenure College 14-3
- 1965 Blackrock College beat Castleknock College 25-0
- 1966 Castleknock College beat De La Salle College Churchtown 6-3
- 1967 Terenure College beat Blackrock College 6-5
- 1968 Blackrock College beat Belvedere College after a 3-3 draw 12-3
- 1969 Blackrock College beat Terenure College 9-6

=== 1970s ===
- 1970 Blackrock College beat Clongowes Wood 23-11
- 1971 St. Mary's College beat Terenure College after a 3-3 draw 6-5
- 1972 Blackrock College beat Belvedere College 14-13
- 1973 Blackrock College beat Presentation College, Bray after 9-9 draw 4-0
- 1974 St. Mary's College beat Belvedere College 10-4
- 1975 Presentation College, Bray beat Belvedere College 9-7
- 1976 Terenure College beat Blackrock College 6-4
- 1977 Terenure College beat Blackrock College 12-10
- 1978 Terenure College beat Blackrock College 10-6
- 1979 Blackrock College beat Belvedere College 4-0

=== 1980s ===
- 1980 Blackrock College beat Templeogue College 5-0
- 1981 Blackrock College beat Presentation College, Bray 16-10
- 1982 Blackrock College beat Terenure College after a 3-3 draw, 12-9
- 1983 Terenure College beat Blackrock College 8-5
- 1984 Blackrock College beat Terenure College 6-3
- 1985 Presentation College, Bray beat Templeogue College 14-0
- 1986 Blackrock College beat St. Michael's College 6-6, 7-0
- 1987 Blackrock College beat Terenure College 12-0
- 1988 Presentation College, Bray beat Clongowes Wood 3-0
- 1989 Terenure College beat Gonzaga College 0-0, 8-6

=== 1990s ===
- 1990 Presentation College, Bray beat Wesley College 9-6
- 1991 St. Michael's College beat Clongowes Wood 9-7
- 1992 St. Mary's College beat Clongowes Wood after a 8-8 draw, 15-12
- 1993 Blackrock College beat St. Mary's College 33-3
- 1994 Belvedere College beat Blackrock College 16-13
- 1995 Blackrock College beat Terenure College 18-3
- 1996 Belvedere College beat St. Mary's College 9-8
- 1997 St. Mary's College beat Terenure College 21-14
- 1998 Blackrock College beat Newbridge College 21-7
- 1999 Belvedere College beat Blackrock College 8-7

=== 2000s ===
- 2000 Blackrock College beat St. Michael's College 27-10
- 2001 Blackrock College beat Belvedere College 14-12
- 2002 St. Michael's College beat Castleknock College 7-6
- 2003 Blackrock College beat Gonzaga College 17-11
- 2004 Blackrock College beat Presentation College, Bray 21-5
- 2005 Belvedere College beat Terenure College 12-6
- 2006 Blackrock College beat Gonzaga College 36-0
- 2007 Blackrock College beat St. Michael's College 13-10
- 2008 Clongowes Wood College beat St. Michael's College 36-0
- 2009 Terenure College Beat St. Michael's College 5-3

=== 2010s ===
- 2010 Terenure College Beat St. Michael's College 31-9
- 2011 Blackrock College Beat St. Michael's College 12-10
- 2012 St. Michael's College Beat Newbridge College 10-5
- 2013 Blackrock College Beat Belvedere College 17-10
- 2014 Blackrock College Beat Belvedere College 14-10
- 2015 Blackrock College Beat Terenure College 15-13
- 2016 Blackrock College Beat St. Michael's College 8-3
- 2017 St. Michael's College beat Blackrock College after a 7-7 draw, 31-17
- 2018 Blackrock College beat St. Mary's College 24-14
- 2019 St. Michael's College beat Blackrock College 26-19

=== 2020s ===
- 2020 Newbridge College & Clongowes Wood College (IRFU declared title shared due to Covid-19 Pandemic)
- 2021 Newbridge College beat Blackrock College 19-15 (Delayed until Sept 2021 due to Covid-19 Pandemic)
- 2022 St Michael's College beat Cistercian College, Roscrea 26-19
- 2023 Blackrock College beat St Michael's College 17-15
- 2024 St. Mary's College beat Terenure College 10-8
- 2025 St Michael's College beat Castleknock College 73-0
- 2026 St Michael's College beat St. Mary's College 14-10
- 2027

== In popular culture ==
- Gerard Siggins's series of novels, Rugby Spirit (2012), Rugby Warrior (2014), Rugby Rebel (2015), Rugby Flyer (2016) and Rugby Runner (2017) tell the story of a boy, Eoin Madden, who plays rugby for the fictional Dublin school "Castlerock College", a portmanteau of Castleknock College and Blackrock College. He takes part in several campaigns with the school, including the Leinster Junior Cup. The school's name is an homage to that in Paul Howard's books, as Siggins had coined the name "Ross O'Carroll-Kelly".

== See also ==
- Leinster Schools Senior Cup
- Connacht Schools Junior Cup
- Munster Schools Junior Cup
- Ulster Schools Junior Cup
