= Leinster Schools Rugby Senior Cup =

Schools rugby union competition in Ireland

- Leinster Schools Senior Challenge Cup
- Sport: Rugby union
- Founded: 1887
- Organising body: Leinster Rugby
- No. of teams: 16
- Most recent champion: St. Mary's College (6th title)
- Most titles: Blackrock College (72 titles)

The Leinster Schools Senior Challenge Cup is the premier rugby union competition for secondary schools affiliated to the Leinster Branch of the Irish Rugby Football Union (IRFU), and was first held in 1887.

Attendances are high for a schoolboy competition, with up to 25000 present at the final. This match traditionally took place on Saint Patrick's Day at Lansdowne Road. In 2008, the final was played at the Royal Dublin Society Grounds (RDS) after Donnybrook proved to be too small for the 2007 final, (Lansdowne Road was closed for redevelopment) and has been the home since. Since the move to the RDS and live television coverage, the attendance has decreased and is now typically 10,000 to 14,000.. Due to the redevelopment of the RDS finals are currently played in Tallaght Stadium

Blackrock College are the most successful school in the cup's history, having won 72 times, more than all other teams combined.

== History ==
Three schools have won the cup at their first attempt; Blackrock College in the competition's maiden year in 1887, Castleknock College who won the first of their eight Leinster titles at the first time of asking when they defeated Blackrock in the 1913 final and Clongowes Wood College who first won the cup in 1926. St. Fintan's High School and Temple Carrig School are the most recent 'new' schools to the competition, making their debuts in the 2016/17 and 2019/20 seasons respectively.

To date, only six schools have achieved the Senior and Junior Cup "double". These are Blackrock, who have achieved this feat 26 times (1910, 1912, 1927, 1933, 1935–36, 1942–43, 1945, 1948, 1953–54, 1956–57, 1962, 1964, 1981–82, 1986–87, 1995, 2004, 2006, 2013–14, 2018), St Michaels twice (2012 & 2019), Newbridge (2020), Belvedere (2005), Terenure (1958) and Castleknock College (1920).

Even more rare is to lose both the Senior and Junior Cup Finals in the same year. This outcome has been experienced by seven schools on 12 occasions. Terenure College leads with 4 (1957, 1964, 1969 & 1987), followed by Belvedere College with 3 (1930, 1944 & 1962), next St Michaels College (2010), St Mary's College (1943), Newbridge College (1939), Cistercian College Roscrea (1910) and Blackrock College (2017) with 1 each. It happened to Blackrock College for the first time in 2017.

Blackrock College have only been defeated in successive finals on two occasions. In the 1920s they were runners up three times in a row, defeated by St Andrews in 1921 & 1922 followed by Belvedere in 1923. The second occasion was in 1979 & 1980 when they were defeated in successive finals by Terenure College.

The 91st Leinster Senior Schools Cup Final in 1977 was between Blackrock College and St Mary's College, and finished level at 12 points each at the end of normal time. Having played 70 minutes, the two sides now faced an additional 15 minutes extra time. Six minutes into extra time Blackrock got a try and conversion. Two further penalties in the second half of extra time sealed victory for Blackrock. The 1977 Leinster Senior Schools Cup Final was played on Sunday 20 March 1977 and not the normal St Patrick's Day. This decision was made to protect the Lansdowne Road pitch following poor weather prior to the Ireland v France Five Nations fixture on 19 March.

In September 1967, the then Minister for Education Donogh O'Malley introduced free secondary school education. Only very few rugby playing secondary schools opted to join the "Free Education" scheme. To date, only one of these non-fee paying schools has managed to win the Senior Cup. In 1983 and 1985, De La Salle Churchtown beat Castleknock College and Blackrock College.

Four captains have gained the distinction of lifting the cup twice, Larry McMahon (Blackrock College, 1929 and 1930), Garret Gill (Blackrock College, 1962 and 1963), Jonny Mion (Blackrock College) in 1989 and 1990, Barry Gibney (Blackrock College) in 1995 and 1996.

The cup, and the schools who play for it, have a history of producing rugby players who have gone on to play for the Ireland national rugby union team. Players such as Denis Hickie, who captained his St. Mary's College team to win the cup in 1994, and Gordon D'Arcy have extensive Leinster Senior Cup records. The most international players produced have come from Blackrock College, with players such as Hugo MacNeill, Brendan Mullin, Brian O'Driscoll, Victor Costello, Shane Byrne, Bob Casey, Leo Cullen, Luke Fitzgerald, Ian Madigan, Jordi Murphy, Garry Ringrose and Joey Carbery.

The 2020 season could not be completed due to the COVID-19 pandemic and as a result the title was deemed shared for the first time by Clongowes Wood College and Newbridge College. It was also only the fourth time that no Dublin based school qualified for the final, 1932 (Pres Bray V Newbridge), 1941 (Newbridge V Roscrea), 2011 (Clongowes V Roscrea).

The 2021 cup campaign did not take place due to the ongoing COVID-19 pandemic.

In 2023 first round tie between Terenure College and Clongowes Wood College, Clongowes won 17–15 in a very tight game. However it emerged afterwards that Clongowes fielded an illegible player and the Schools committee ordered a replay. Clongowes also won the replay 20–19 with Terenure hitting the posts with a last minute penalty attempt.

== Roll of honour ==
School	Location	Titles	Winning years
Blackrock College	Blackrock, Dún Laoghaire–Rathdown	72	1887–88, 1890, 1893–97, 1900–05, 1907–1910, 1912, 1915–1919, 1925, 1927–1930, 1933–1936, 1939, 1940, 1942, 1943, 1945, 1948, 1949, 1950, 1956, 1957, 1960, 1962, 1964, 1967, 1974, 1975, 1977, 1981, 1982, 1986, 1987, 1989, 1990, 1995, 1996, 1999, 2004, 2006, 2009, 2013, 2014, 2018, 2022, 2024, 2025 SCT & JCT Double 26 times – 1910, 1912, 1927, 1933, 1935, 1936, 1942, 1943, 1945, 1948, 1953, 1954, 1956, 1957, 1962, 1964, 1981, 1982, 1986, 1987, 1995, 2004, 2006, 2013, 2014, 2018
Belvedere College	Great Denmark Street, Dublin City	12	1923–24, 1938, 1946, 1951, 1968, 1971–72, 2005 (Double), 2008, 2016–17
Terenure College	Terenure, Dublin City	10	1952, 1958 (Double), 1979–80, 1984, 1992–93, 1997, 2001, 2003
Clongowes Wood College	Clane, County Kildare	9	1926, 1978, 1988, 1991, 1998, 2000, 2010–11, 2020^{2}
Castleknock College	Castleknock, Dublin	8	1913, 1920 (Double), 1931, 1937, 1944, 1947, 1959, 1965
St. Mary's College	Rathmines, Dublin City	6	1961, 1966, 1969, 1994, 2002, 2026
St. Andrew's College	Booterstown, Dún Laoghaire–Rathdown	4	1906, 1911, 1921, 1922
Newbridge College	Newbridge, County Kildare	3	1941, 1970, 2020^{2} (Double)
St. Michael's College	Ailesbury Road, Dublin 4	3	2007, 2012 (Double), 2019 (Double)
De La Salle Churchtown	Churchtown, Dublin	2	1983, 1985
Corrig School^{4} (Closed)	Monkstown, Dún Laoghaire–Rathdown	2	1889, 1892
Gonzaga College	Ranelagh, Dublin	1	2023
Cistercian College, Roscrea	Roscrea, County Offaly	1	2015
C.B.C. Monkstown	Monkstown, Dún Laoghaire–Rathdown	1	1976
The High School	Rathgar, Dublin	1	1973
Presentation College Bray	Bray, County Wicklow	1	1932
Mountjoy School / Mount Temple Comprehensive School^{1}	Malahide Road, Dublin City	1	1914
Saint Columba's College	Whitechurch, South Dublin	1	1899
Wesley College	Ballinteer, Dún Laoghaire–Rathdown	1	1898
Rathmines School^{3} (Closed)	Rathmines, Dublin City	1	1891

^{1} Mountjoy School was amalgamated with other schools in 1972 to become Mount Temple Comprehensive School.
^{2} SCT Final not played due to COVID-19. Cup shared.
^{3} Rathmines school closed in 1899.
^{4} Corrig School (Monkstown Park School), a Protestant school closed in the first half of the 20th century and later in the 1950s the catholic CBC Monkstown transferred part of the school to the campus

== Results ==
Year	Winner	Score	Runner-up	Venue
1887	Blackrock College	3–0	Farra School, Westmeath	
1888	Blackrock College	8–0	Rathmines School	
1889	Corrig School	4–0	Galway Grammar School	
1890	Blackrock College	22–0	Corrig School	
1891	Rathmines School	1–0	Wesley College	
1892	Corrig School	0–0; 6–2	Rathmines School	
1893	Blackrock College	18–0	Rathmines School	
1894	Blackrock College	5–0	Corrig School	
1895	Blackrock College	15–3	Wesley College	
1896	Blackrock College	8–3	Wesley College	
1897	Blackrock College	25–0	The High School	
1898	Wesley College	15–0	Rathmines School	
1899	St. Columba's College	8–5	Blackrock College	
1900	Blackrock College	63–0	Corrig School	
1901	Blackrock College	13–0	Corrig School	
1902	Blackrock College	3–3; 18–0	St. Andrew's College	
1903	Blackrock College	8–5	St. Andrew's College	
1904	Blackrock College	8–0	Mountjoy School	
1905	Blackrock College	0–0; 6–0	Mountjoy School	
1906	St. Andrew's College	5–0	Blackrock College	Jones' Road
1907	Blackrock College	28–3	The King's Hospital	
1908	Blackrock College	9–3	St. Andrew's College	
1909	Blackrock College	25–0	The High School	
1910	Blackrock College	0–0; 6–3	Cistercian College, Roscrea	
1911	St. Andrew's College	9–3	Mountjoy School	
1912	Blackrock College	11–0	St. Columba's College	
1913	Castleknock College	8–5	Blackrock College	
1914	Mountjoy School	3–0	Wesley College	
1915	Blackrock College	12–0	The High School	
1916	Blackrock College	14–3	Castleknock College	
1917	Blackrock College	21–0	Belvedere College	
1918	Blackrock College	12–0	Mountjoy School	
1919	Blackrock College	25–0	The High School	
1920	Castleknock College	9–0	Mountjoy School	
1921	St. Andrew's College	6–0	Blackrock College	
1922	St. Andrew's College	3–0	Blackrock College	
1923	Belvedere College	2–0	Blackrock College	
1924	Belvedere College	8–3	Castleknock College	
1925	Blackrock College	2–0	Castleknock College	
1926	Clongowes Wood College	10–9	Belvedere College	Lansdowne Road
1927	Blackrock College	12–5	Clongowes Wood College	
1928	Blackrock College	6–0	Clongowes Wood College	
1929	Blackrock College	8–0	Clongowes Wood College	
1930	Blackrock College	11–7	Belvedere College	
1931	Castleknock College	6–0	Belvedere College	
1932	Presentation Bray	6–4	Newbridge College	
1933	Blackrock College	10–0	Belvedere College	
1934	Blackrock College	33–0	Wesley College	
1935	Blackrock College	18–3	Wesley College	
1936	Blackrock College	14–0	Clongowes Wood College	
1937	Castleknock College	8–0	Mountjoy School	
1938	Belvedere College	3–0	Castleknock College	
1939	Blackrock College	8–3	Newbridge College	
1940	Blackrock College	3–0	Castleknock College	
1941	Newbridge College	0–0; 9–3	Cistercian College, Roscrea	
1942	Blackrock College	9–6	Castleknock College	
1943	Blackrock College	9–6	St. Mary's College	
1944	Castleknock College	18–3	Belvedere College	
1945	Blackrock College	28–3	Newbridge College	
1946	Belvedere College	8–0	St. Mary's College	
1947	Castleknock College	6–0	Blackrock College	
1948	Blackrock College	9–0	Castleknock College	
1949	Blackrock College	6–3	Clongowes Wood College	
1950	Blackrock College	18–0	Castleknock College	
1951	Belvedere College	12–0	The King's Hospital	
1952	Terenure College	9–3	Castleknock College	
1953	Blackrock College	11–0	Clongowes Wood College	
1954	Blackrock College	11–3	Belvedere College	
1955	Blackrock College	11–8	Castleknock College	
1956	Blackrock College	11–0	Terenure College	
1957	Blackrock College	5–3	Terenure College	
1958	Terenure College	3–0	Belvedere College	
1959	Castleknock College	11–9	Newbridge College	
1960	Blackrock College	13–6	Terenure College	
1961	St. Mary's College	11–0	Castleknock College	
1962	Blackrock College	9–3	Belvedere College	
1963	Blackrock College	6–0	The High School	
1964	Blackrock College	3–0	Terenure College	
1965	Castleknock College	12–8	Blackrock College	
1966	St. Mary's College	14–6	Newbridge College	
1967	Blackrock College	11–3	St. Mary's College	
1968	Belvedere College	14–11	De La Salle Churchtown	
1969	St. Mary's College	10–9	Terenure College	
1970	Newbridge College	19–5	Blackrock College	
1971	Belvedere College	14–11	Presentation Bray	
1972	Belvedere College	20–10	Terenure College	
1973	The High School	19–7	Belvedere College	
1974	Blackrock College	10–6	St. Mary's College	
1975	Blackrock College	11–7	De La Salle Churchtown	
1976	C.B.C. Monkstown	3–0	Castleknock College	
1977	Blackrock College	12–12 FT; 24–12 ET	St. Mary's College	
1978	Clongowes Wood College	9–6	Terenure College	
1979	Terenure College	15–9	Blackrock College	
1980	Terenure College	12–10	Blackrock College	
1981	Blackrock College	9–3	Clongowes Wood College	
1982	Blackrock College	22–3	The King's Hospital	
1983	De La Salle Churchtown	13–6	Castleknock College	Lansdowne Road
1984	Terenure College	15–3	C.B.C. Monkstown	
1985	De La Salle Churchtown	10–6	Blackrock College	
1986	Blackrock College	10–3	De La Salle Churchtown	
1987	Blackrock College	15–9	Terenure College	
1988	Clongowes Wood College	6–3	St Michael's College	
1989	Blackrock College	28–16	Belvedere College	
1990	Blackrock College	14–6	Clongowes Wood College	
1991	Clongowes Wood College	7–3	St Michael's College	
1992	Terenure College	19–6	Belvedere College	Lansdowne Road
1993	Terenure College	8–3	Clongowes Wood College	
1994	St. Mary's College	14–14; 7–3	Clongowes Wood College	
1995	Blackrock College	8–3	Clongowes Wood College	Lansdowne Road
1996	Blackrock College	37–3	Newbridge College	Lansdowne Road
1997	Terenure College	22–15	Clongowes Wood College	Lansdowne Road
1998	Clongowes Wood College	37–18	Terenure College	Lansdowne Road
1999	Blackrock College	17–9	Cistercian College, Roscrea	Lansdowne Road
2000	Clongowes Wood College	13–11	Terenure College	Lansdowne Road
2001	Terenure College	21–19	Blackrock College	Lansdowne Road
2002	St. Mary's College	10–6	Belvedere College	Lansdowne Road
2003	Terenure College	6–6; 3–0	St. Mary's College	Lansdowne Road
2004	Blackrock College	24–9	Clongowes Wood College	Lansdowne Road
2005	Belvedere College	16–10	Blackrock College	Lansdowne Road
2006	Blackrock College	14–12	St Michael's College	Lansdowne Road
2007	St Michael's College	6–0	Clongowes Wood College	Donnybrook Stadium
2008	Belvedere College	11–10	St. Mary's College	RDS
2009	Blackrock College	18–9	Terenure College	RDS
2010	Clongowes Wood College	38–20	St Michael's College	RDS
2011	Clongowes Wood College	46–15	Cistercian College, Roscrea	RDS
2012	St Michael's College	17–10	Clongowes Wood College	RDS
2013	Blackrock College	23–20	St Michael's College	RDS
2014	Blackrock College	22–17	Clongowes Wood College	RDS
2015	Cistercian College, Roscrea	18–11	Belvedere College	RDS
2016	Belvedere College	31–7	Cistercian College, Roscrea	RDS
2017	Belvedere College	10–3	Blackrock College	RDS
2018	Blackrock College	35–12	Belvedere College	RDS
2019	St Michael's College	28–5	Gonzaga College	RDS
2020	Clongowes Wood College; Newbridge College	Joint Winners	—N/a	N/A
2021	Cancelled due to COVID-19 Pandemic			N/A
2022	Blackrock College	50–21	Gonzaga College	RDS
2023	Gonzaga College	35–31	Blackrock College	RDS
2024	Blackrock College	28–12	St Michael's College	RDS
2025	Blackrock College	14–9	Terenure College	Tallaght Stadium
2026	St. Mary's College	24–24; 25–22	Blackrock College	Tallaght Stadium Donnybrook (Replay)
2027		–		RDS - New Stand

=== Records ===
- Most consecutive wins: 6, Blackrock College 1900–05
- Greatest winning margin in final: 63 points, 1900: Blackrock College 63-0 Corrig School
- Narrowest winning margin in final: 1 point, 1891: Blackrock College 1–0 Wesley College; 1969: St. Mary's College 10–9 Terenure College; 2008: Belvedere College 11–10 St. Mary's College
- Highest aggregate score in final: 71 points, 2022: Blackrock College 50-21 Gonzaga College

== Sponsorship and media coverage ==
The competition was known for several years as the "Coca-Cola Leinster Schools Senior Cup" and in later years the "Powerade Leinster Schools Senior Cup" (Powerade is also owned by the Coca-Cola Company). In September 2013, Beauchamps Solicitors became the title sponsor for the Leinster Schools Senior Cup. For the duration of this partnership with Beauchamps, the Senior Cup was known as the "Beauchamps Leinster Schools Senior Cup".

The competition receives coverage in Ireland's broadsheets, in particular the Irish Independent and The Irish Times. Both publish previews of each year's competition and provide match reports for each game played.

The competition's final on St Patrick's Day was previously broadcast on TG4, however, this was discontinued in the early 2000s. From 2005 onwards, however, Setanta Sports began coverage of school's rugby. This included the finals of all provincial finals and coverage of the Leinster Schools Junior Cup. The Leinster Senior Cup was most prominent, however, with coverage from every game played at Donnybrook and every round of the competition.

FreeSports replaced Eir Sport as the competition broadcaster ahead of the 2019 competition where they will broadcast eight games live.

== Leinster School of the Year Award ==
In 2008, Leinster Rugby instituted an award for overall performance of a school at every level of schools rugby. The award, "Powerade Leinster Rugby School of the Year", has been given at an annual Leinster awards ceremony.

The inaugural winners were C.B.C. Monkstown. They were followed in by Terenure College (2009), St Gerard's School (2010), Clongowes Wood College (2011), St. Michael's College (2012), (2019) and Blackrock College (2013), (2018). Gonzaga College (2017)

== Tiers ==
Schools Senior Cup Rugby in Leinster is divided into 4 tiers in two sections, and each cup competition bears a name. These 'tiers', in ascending order, include: Section A Leinster Schools Rugby Senior Development Cup (effectively division 4), Section A Leinster Schools Rugby McMullen Cup (effectively division 3), Section B Leinster Schools Vinnie Murray Cup (effectively division 2), Section B Leinster Schools Senior Challenge Cup (effectively division 1).

The second-tier competition, the Leinster School's Vinnie Murray Cup, is contested by secondary schools affiliated to the Leinster Branch of the IRFU. It is named in memory of Vincent Murray, a teacher in Clongowes Wood college who trained the rugby team and died in December 1999. In recent years Catholic University School won in both 2022 and 2023, St. Fintan's High School won the cup in 2024 and Presentation College, Bray won the Vinnie Murray Cup in 2025. With five wins, C.B.C. Monkstown has won the Vinnie Murray Cup the most times. Wesley College the second most with four wins. Catholic University School the third most with three wins. Gonzaga College, The King's Hospital and St Gerard's School have won the trophy twice. Kilkenny College, Temple Carrig School, St. Fintan's High School and Presentation College Bray have each won the cup once.

== In popular culture ==
- The Ross O'Carroll-Kelly character, created by Paul Howard, lives off the glory of winning a Leinster Senior Cup final medal with the fictional school "Castlerock College" (based on Blackrock College and Castleknock College) in the novel The Miseducation of Ross O'Carroll-Kelly.
- Gerard Siggins' series of novels, Rugby Spirit (2012), Rugby Warrior (2014), Rugby Rebel (2015), Rugby Flyer (2016) and Rugby Runner (2017) tell the story of a boy, Eoin Madden, who plays rugby for the fictional Dublin school "Castlerock College". He takes part in several campaigns with the school, including the Leinster Junior Cup. The school's name is an homage to that in Paul Howard's books, as Siggins had coined the name "Ross O'Carroll Kelly".

== See also ==
- Leinster Schools Junior Cup
- Connacht Schools Rugby Senior Cup
- Munster Schools Rugby Senior Cup
- Ulster Schools Senior Cup
- Ireland national schoolboy rugby union team
