= St Michael's College, Dublin =

Primary and secondary school for boys, Ireland

St Michael's College
- Coláiste Naomh Mhíchíl
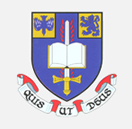

Location
- Ailesbury Road; Dublin; Ireland; 53.320076°N 6.216562°W

Information
- Type: Voluntary
- Motto: Quis ut deus (Latin for 'Who is like unto God')
- Religious affiliation: Roman Catholic
- Established: 1944
- Sister school: Blackrock College, St. Mary's College, Rockwell College, Templeogue College
- Principal: Alan Rogan (2026-present)
- Years offered: Primary School and Secondary School
- Colours: Sky blue, Navy
- School fees: €6,338.00 (2022/2023)
- Religious order: Holy Ghost Fathers
- Website: Official website

St Michael's College (Irish: Coláiste Naomh Mícheál) is a voluntary Catholic boys' school, with an associated primary school, located on Ailesbury Road in Dublin 4, Ireland. Founded in 1944 by the Congregation of the Holy Spirit (The Spiritans) as a second feeder school along with Willow Park, it was initially a primary school to Blackrock College. The first eight pupils were transferred from Willow Park. The next September, 58 boys were enrolled. In 1952 the first secondary school pupils were admitted. Following expansion in the 1960s and 1970s, the school developed both a primary and secondary school. It has been extensively expanded, including the opening of a cafeteria, a sports pavilion, as well as new classrooms and a new gym.

== History ==
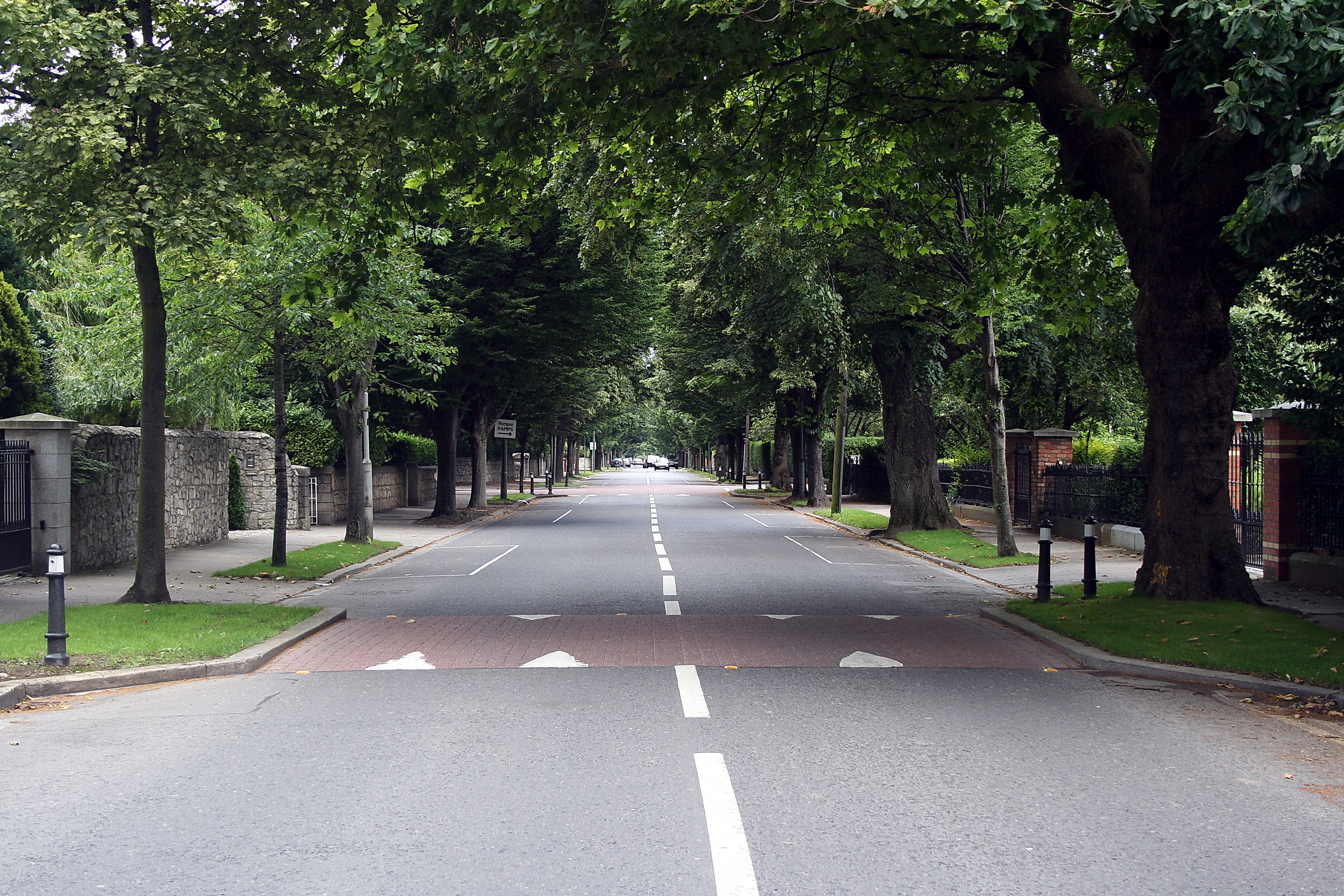
The school is located on Dublin's Ailesbury Road

=== 1950s and 1960s ===
In 1952–53 St. Michael's had its first boys go into First Year, which became the origin of the senior school, which contained just eight pupils that first year. By 1963, the school was growing. For the first time a second First Year class was created. In 1967–68, the school started constructing a new wing, which included the assembly hall and swimming pool. From 1944 to 1968, St. Michael's had continued to be a junior school which had served as far as Second Year, but in 1968 it was decided that pupils would stay in St. Michael's until after the Intermediate Certificate (4th Year). In 1970–71, Archbishop John Charles McQuaid blessed and opened the new junior school and swimming pool. In December 1970, Seamus Galvin was appointed the first president (1970–1976), and this was the first time St Michael's officially became an independent school and community from Blackrock College.

=== 1970s and 1980s ===
In 1972–73 the school started construction of the new library, classrooms and science rooms. In 1974–75 Archbishop Dermot Ryan opened the new buildings. In 1975, pupils from St. Michael's sat the Leaving Certificate for the first time. The following year, Cyril Sheedy became superior of St Michael's, Laurence McHugh was appointed principal of the junior school with Fr Flood appointed principal of the senior school.

In 1982 Aidan Lehane was appointed principal of the senior school until 1991. Seamus Galvin became the first president of the Past Pupils' Union in 1986. In 1991 while the Senior Cup team were defeated in the final against Clongowes, the Junior Cup team won the first title against Clongowes. The following year (1991–92), Willie Bradley was appointed principal of the senior school. Mairéad Burke was appointed principal of the junior school 1992–93. Lehane was appointed manager of St Michael's later that same year. In 1993–94, St Michael's celebrated its Golden Jubilee.

=== 1990s and 2000s ===
Michael Duggan was appointed superior in 1995. In 1995–96 Mr. Len Howard was appointed Principal of the Senior School, with Mr. Noel Turley as Vice Principal and Fr. Lehane appointed as manager of the school. In 1997–98, Fr. Billy Cleary was appointed manager of the school. The start of the building of the new school began in 1998–99.

The following year Ms. Lorna Heslin was appointed Deputy Principal of the Junior School. In 2000–01 the new school building was opened. Fr. Pat Palmer dedicated the new college chapel, Cardinal Desmond Connell blessed the new building and President Mary McAleese visited the school. In 2001–02, Fr Bradley was appointed manager of the school. The Taoiseach Bertie Ahern visited the school. The Junior Cup team defeated Castleknock in the final for a second Junior Cup title. In 2001–02 Tim Kelleher was appointed principal of the senior school and Sheila Murray as deputy principal.

The following year, boards of management were set up for both the senior and junior schools. 2006–07 St Michael's won their first-ever Senior Cup and had a school record of 5 players playing for the Irish U-19s in the U-19s World Cup hosted in Belfast that summer.

== Academics ==
The school was ranked ninth in Ireland in terms of the number of students who progressed to third level and by the types of institutions to which the students progressed.

== Extra-curricular activities ==
Sports played include rugby, basketball and Gaelic sports.

=== Rugby ===
The school has a strong rugby playing tradition, having won the Leinster Schools Junior Cup six times: in 1991, 2002, 2012, 2017, 2019 and 2022 in addition to reaching 6 JCT finals in a row up to 2012. In addition to the run of finals 2007–2012 the school has also finished runners up in the Leinster Schools Junior Cup in 1986, 2000 and 2016. The school has won the Leinster Schools Senior Cup three times first in 2007, when Noel Reid kicked all six of the game's points, and again in 2012 when Dan Leavy captained the team beating Clongowes Wood College in the final. In 2019 the school won the cup for the third time, beating Gonzaga College.

In 2013, St Michael's reached the Senior Cup Final with captain Ross Molony but narrowly missed out on a second consecutive victory to Blackrock College. The school were runners-up in 1988, 1991, 2006 & 2010. The school participates in an U13s (now U14s) Cup rugby competition organised and played by Spiritian schools; Templeogue, St Mary's, Willow Park (Blackrock) and Rockwell colleges.

Blackrock v St Michael's 2006 Leinster Schools Senior Cup final at Lansdowne Road

In 2016 St Michael's has invested heavily in on site sporting facilities and has now astro-turf all weather training, astro-turf all-weather pitch and scrummaging areas, modern weights and a gym zone, in addition to a new sports pavilion housing modern changing facilities and showers. In addition St Michael's has a number of rugby pitches and training areas located on its Dublin 4 campus. It also has a large indoor basketball/football/training arena and an 18-metre indoor swimming pool. St Michael's senior school fields 18-21 rugby teams annually from U-14s right through to U-19s; its junior school houses a rugby nursery for boys aged from 4–12 years.

Simon Keogh (class of 1998), was a member of Senior Schools Cup sides for three years up to 1998 when he also captained the first XV. He has played professional rugby for many seasons having played with Leinster (2000–03), Harlequins (UK; playing 133 times between 2003 and 2009) and re-signing for Leinster in 2009 & 2010. He won a European Cup medal with Leinster in 2009 having won a European Shield medal with Quinns in 2004 where he scored the match winning try. Keogh has also represented Ireland at schools, u21, sevens and A levels. In 2011 he was a member of the Old Belvedere RFC 1st XV who won the All Ireland League Division 1 title.

Aidan Kearney (class of 1998 and member of the 1st XV that year), played a number of seasons professionally with Leinster (2003–04) and then Ulster. He represented Ireland at u19s and u21 levels winning an under 19 Rugby World Cup medal in 1998.

As of 2020, St Michael's has more than 20 past-pupils playing professional rugby, across Ireland, the UK, France and the USA.

On 2 November 2020, a record nine St. Michael's graduates played in Leinster Rugby's Pro14 win against Glasgow Warriors in Scotstoun. This record of nine players in the matchday 23 was equaled in a European Rugby Champions Cup match against Northampton Saints in December 2020.

Former St. Michael's rugby coaches, Greg McWilliams and Mark McDermott coached the USA Rugby and Russian national rugby team, respectively at the 2019 Rugby World Cup.

Rugby honours

- Leinster Schools Rugby Senior Cup - 2007, 2012, 2019
- Leinster Schools Junior Cup - 1991, 2002, 2012, 2017, 2019, 2022
- Leinster Schools Rugby Senior League - 1998

=== GAA ===
The school provides teams for boys in first and second year, and has entered the Leinster GAA Schools competition since 2008. The junior school also enters the Cumann na mBunscol GAA league, and they won the shield in 2014.

== Notable past pupils ==
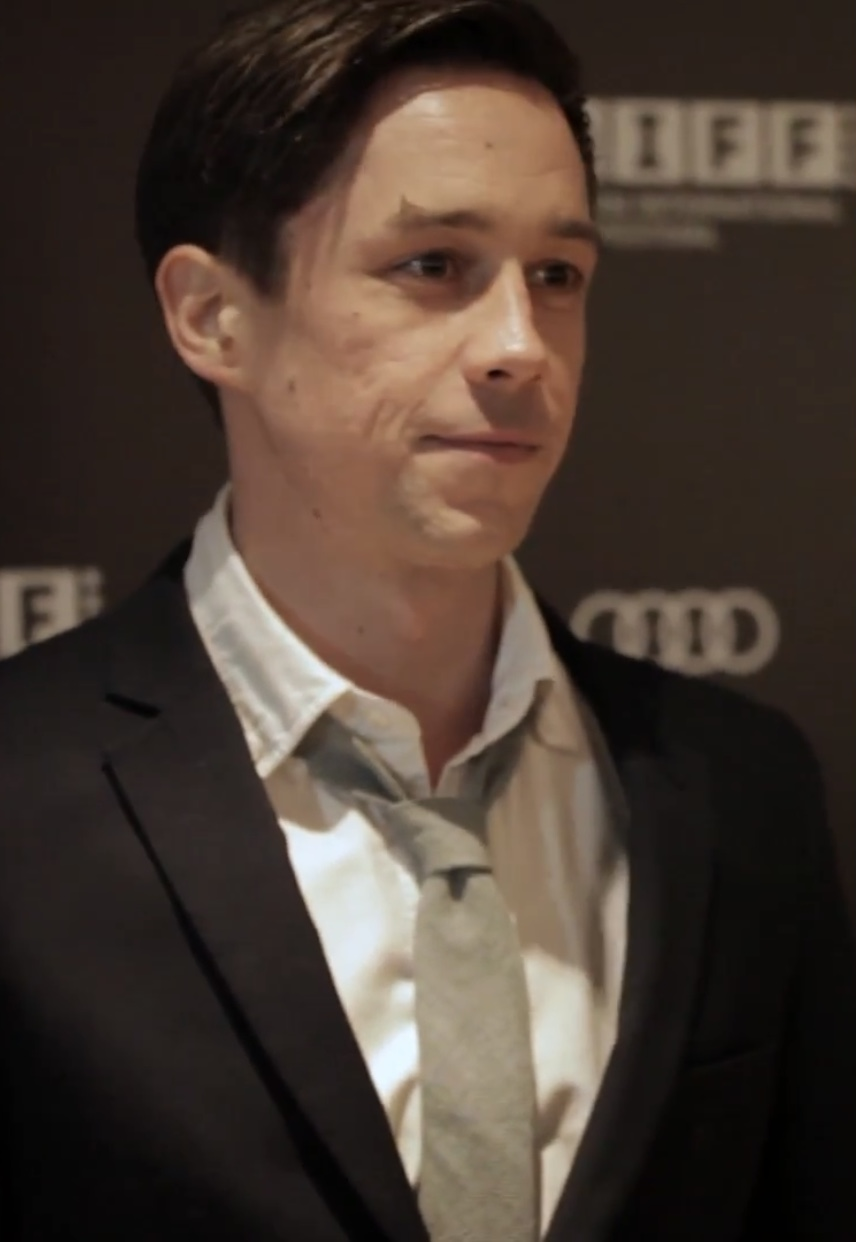
Killian Scott, St. Michael's past pupil

The arts

- Robert Ballagh - painter
- Risteard Cooper – actor, comedian
- Allen Leech – actor
- Fergus Martin - artist
- Peter McDonald - actor
- David O'Doherty - comedian
- Jason O'Mara - actor
- Killian Scott - actor

Politics

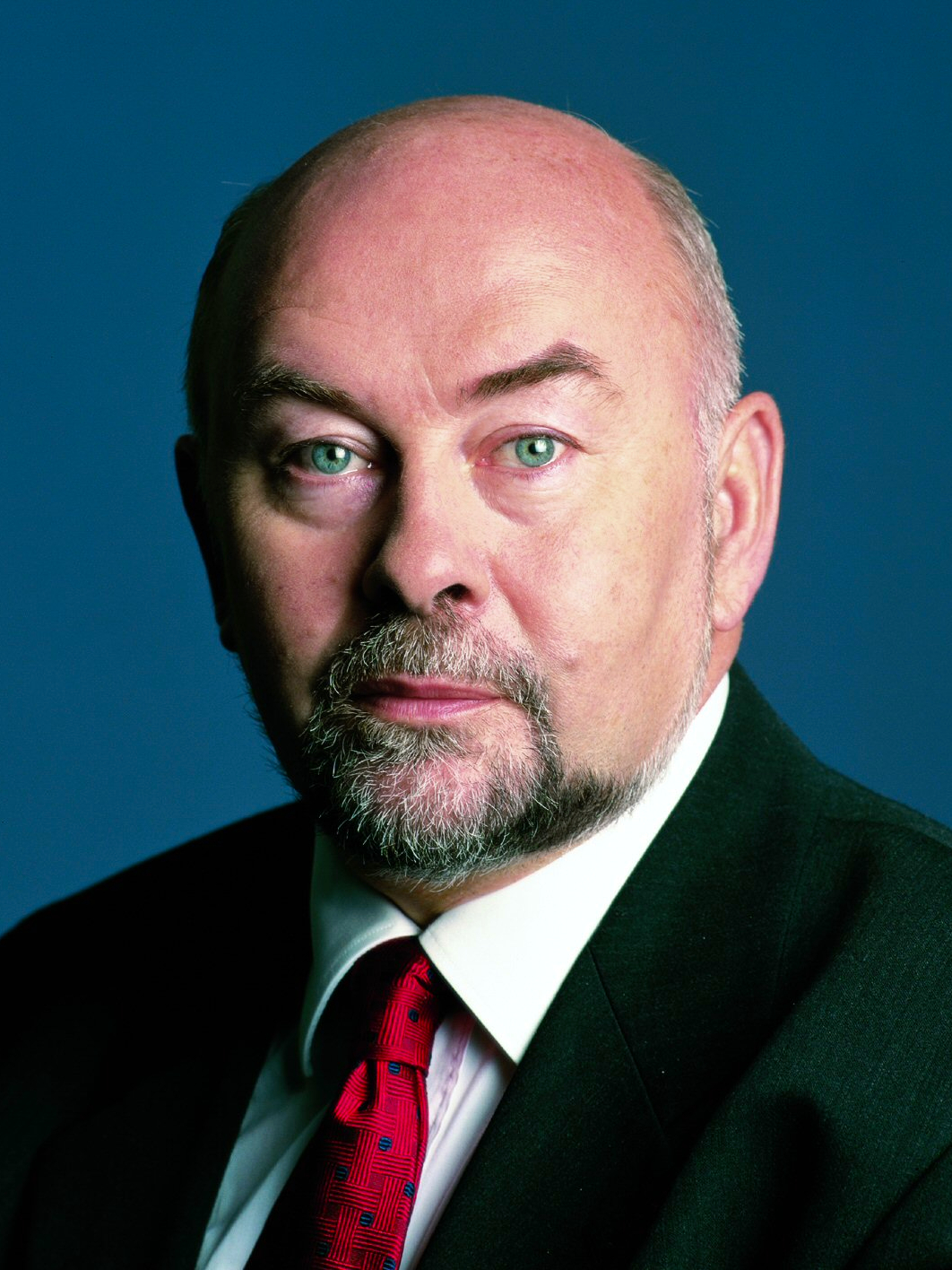
Ruairí Quinn, Former Irish Finance Minister and leader of the Labour Party, who attended St. Michael's College

- Richard Boyd Barrett – Teachta Dála (TD) AAA-PBP
- Charles Lysaght – lawyer
- Eoghan Murphy – Former Fine Gael TD and Minister for Housing
- Ruairi Quinn – former Labour Party (Ireland) leader and Minister for Finance (1994 - 1997)

Rugby union

- John "China" Murray - became the school's first international in 1963 when he made his debut against France at Lansdowne Road
- Derek McGrath - former Leinster Rugby and Ireland Rugby - became the school's second international in 1984
- Noel Reid – Agen and former Leicester Rugby, Leinster Rugby and Ireland Rugby - became the school's third international in 2014
- James Ryan – Leinster Rugby and Ireland Rugby - In 2020, became the first graduate of the school to captain the national senior rugby team
- Luke McGrath – Leinster Rugby and Ireland Rugby - nephew of Derek
- Dan Leavy – Leinster Rugby and Ireland Rugby
- Adam Leavy – Ireland Rugby sevens
- Rory O'Loughlin – Leinster Rugby and Ireland Rugby
- Nick McCarthy - Leinster Rugby and Ireland Rugby u20s
- Ross Byrne – Leinster Rugby and Ireland Rugby
- Ross Molony – Leinster Rugby and Ireland Rugby u20s
- Rónan Kelleher – Leinster Rugby and Ireland Rugby
- Cian Kelleher – Leinster Rugby and former Connacht Rugby
- Jack Kelly – Leinster Rugby and Ireland Rugby u20s
- Scott Penny – Leinster Rugby and Ireland Rugby u20s
- Max Deegan – Leinster Rugby and Ireland Rugby
- Ryan Baird – Leinster Rugby and Ireland Rugby u20s
- Óisín Dowling – Leinster Rugby
- Jack Dunne – Leinster Rugby
- Harry Byrne – Leinster Rugby
- Denis Coulson – US Carcassonne and former FC Grenoble and Connacht Rugby
- Cathal Marsh - Rugby United New York and former Leinster Rugby and Ireland Rugby u20s
- Keith Gleeson – former Irish rugby international and Leinster player
- Simon Keogh – former Leinster Rugby
- Josh Murphy - Leinster Rugby
- Andrew Smith - Leinster Rugby
- Lee Barron - Leinster Rugby
- Jack Boyle - Leinster Rugby

Cricket

- Padraic Flanagan – first-class cricketer for Cambridge University
- Barry McCarthy – Leinster Lightning and Ireland and formerly of Durham

== Notable teachers ==
- Dermot Morgan – The future "Father Ted" taught English in the college before becoming a full-time actor.
- Brian O'Meara - former Leinster and Ireland professional rugby player taught history in the school.
