= James Creedon =

James Creedon may refer to:

- James Creedon (politician)
- James Creedon (journalist)
