= Mac Críodáin =

Gaelic-Irish surname

Mac Críodáin, Gaelic-Irish surname, anglicised as Creedon.

This surname originated in medieval Munster, being found especially in Thomond, Ormond, and Desmond (now counties Clare and Limerick, County Tipperary, and counties Waterford and Cork).

Thady Credan, of Drangan, Tipperary, and William MacCruddan, were musicians pardoned in the fiants between 1565 and 1586.

Bearers of the name include John Creedon, broadcaster with RTÉ Radio; John J. Creedon, CEO with Metropolitan Life Insurance Company; and Dave Creedon (1919–2007), an Irish sportsperson.

== See also ==
- Peter Creedon, Gaelic football manager
- Carolyn Creedon, poet
- Johnny Creedon, Gaelic footballer
- James Creedon, Secretary of the Pennsylvania Department of General Services
