= Mark McDermott =

- Full name: Mark Anthony McDermott
- Born: 10 June 1971 (age 55) Dublin, Republic of Ireland

Rugby union career
- Position: hooker
- Current team: The High School, Dublin (acting head coach)
Senior career
| Years | Team | Apps | (Points) |
| ?–1997 | Lansdowne FC | | |
| 1997–? | Shannon RFC | | |
Provincial / State sides
| Years | Team | Apps | (Points) |
| 1996-1997 | Leinster | | |
| 1997-1999 | Munster | | |
International career
| Years | Team | Apps | (Points) |
| 1997–1998 | Ireland A | 5 | |
Coaching career
- Years: Team
- Ireland U21
- 2007-: St. Michael's College, Dublin
- 2018-2019: Russia (acting head coach)
- 2022-: The High School, Dublin

Mark Anthony McDermott is an Irish rugby union player and coach. As of 2019, he was a coach with Russia's national rugby union team.

He played as hooker for Leinster (4 apps in Heineken Cup) and Munster (12 apps in Heineken Cup); and, at the Irish senior level, for Lansdowne FC and Shannon RFC. He also played for Ireland second national team.

McDermott was forwards coach for St. Michael's College, Dublin leading to the school's first Leinster Schools Senior Cup win in 2007.

He worked with Ireland U21 team as assistant coach, then from May 2004 as coach. He was also IRFU's Elite Player Development Manager.

From August 2016 to February 2018, McDermott was forwards coach in the Russia national team. In February 2018, after Aleksandr Pervukhin resigned, he was appointed the acting head coach of Russia. Subsequently replaced as coach by Lyn Jones, McDermott continued to hold a number of roles with the Rugby Union of Russia until 2021.

== See also ==
- 2018 Rugby Europe Championship
