= John Murphy (rugby union, born 1957) =

Irish rugby union player

- Full name: John Joseph Murphy
- Born: 27 August 1957 (age 69) Bray, County Wicklow, Ireland
- School: Presentation College, Bray
- Notable relative: Richie Murphy (nephew)

Rugby union career
- Position: Fullback
International career
Years	Team	Apps	(Points)
1981–84	Ireland	3	(5)

John Joseph Murphy (born 27 August 1957) is an Irish former rugby union international.

Murphy was born and raised in Bray, County Wicklow and attended Presentation College, Bray.

A football (soccer) player in his youth, Murphy was signed by Arsenal in the early 1970s as one of several Irish teenage recruits at the time, including David O'Leary with whom he shared a room in London.

Due to homesickness, Murphy returned to Ireland after only six months, devoting his time instead to his other childhood sport of rugby union. He played club rugby for Greystones RFC and at provincial level turned out for Leinster. A fullback, he was capped in three Tests for Ireland, debuting against the Springboks on the 1981 tour of South Africa. He also featured in Ireland's Triple Crown-winning 1982 Five Nations campaign.

Murphy is the uncle of Ireland under-20s coach Richie Murphy.

== See also ==
- List of Ireland national rugby union players
