= Templeogue College =

School in Dublin, Ireland

Templeogue College CSSP
- Coláiste Theach Mealóg

Location
- Templeville Road, Templeogue, Dublin 6W. Leinster; Ireland; 53.3044°N 6.3118°W

Information
- Motto: In virtute scientia (Education rooted in values)
- Religious affiliations: Catholic Church; Holy Ghost Fathers
- Established: 1967; 59 years ago
- Principal: Ciarán Dowling
- Enrollment: 675
- Colours: Red, white and blue
- Sports: Rugby, Gaelic football, association football, basketball, badminton
- Website: templeoguecollege.ie

Templeogue College C.S.Sp is a boys' voluntary secondary school in the suburb of Templeogue in Dublin, Ireland. It was founded in 1966 and is run by the Holy Ghost Fathers (Spiritans), a Roman Catholic religious institute. The motto of the school is in virtute scientia ('education rooted in values'). As of December 2024, there were 675 pupils enrolled in the school. The school's principal is Ciarán Dowling.

== History ==
Templeogue College was founded in September 1966. It has been historically associated with the Holy Ghost Fathers (the Spiritans), and the Spiritan Education Trust remains the patron of the school.

At the time of the school's establishment, in 1966, its grounds contained a priests' residence, gymnasium and the main school building. The school grew following the introduction of free secondary education in Ireland in 1967, and a swimming pool was opened. In the 1990s, additional classrooms, canteen facilities and a study hall were added.

== Sport ==
The school participates in sports including rugby union, basketball, football, athletics, and badminton.

The Templeogue College rugby team, whose colours are red and blue, reached the final of the Leinster Schools Junior Cup in 1980 and in 1985. In the 1980 final, the school lost 0-4 to Blackrock College of Dublin and, in the 1985 final, the school lost 0-14 to Presentation College of Bray, County Wicklow.

In 2002, the school rugby team visited South Africa, the first state school in Ireland to do so. In 2003, the school won the Leinster Schools Rugby Senior League. Also in rugby, the school has won a number of McMullen Shield competitions.

== Controversies ==
In early 2024, a former teacher raised a case against the school with the Workplace Relations Commission (WRC). The details of the complaint were reportedly refuted by the then principal who made "counter claims". In the WRC testimony, where it was alleged that Tipp-Ex had been used to "doctor" the details of a teacher's contract, the then principal was reputedly described by the complainant as a "corridor angel and office devil". At the conclusion of the WRC process, Templeogue College was ordered to pay approximately €40,000 to the teacher who had been subject to "multiple and sustained acts of penalisation". The principal subsequently stepped down from her role.

An RTÉ report, from July 2024, suggested that four teachers had taken employment rights claims against the school in the preceding two years.

In mid-2024, an article in that TheJournal.ie stated that close to "300 former pupils report[ed] abuse by clergy and lay staff at Spiritan schools". These schools reportedly included Templeogue College as well as Blackrock College, Willow Park and Rockwell College.

== Alumni ==
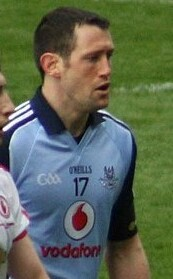
Dublin footballer Denis Bastick, Templeogue past pupil

- Carl Mullan, Irish radio presenter
- Denis Bastick, Gaelic footballer, Dublin inter-county team
- Lorcan Dempsey, vice president and chief strategist of OCLC
- Diarmuid Gavin, gardener and TV personality
- Brendan Hyland, swimmer
- Morgan Kelly, professor of Economics at UCD
- Albert Manifold, Irish business executive
- Dave McSharry, Connacht rugby union player
- Eoghan O'Gara, Gaelic footballer, Dublin inter-county team
- Malcolm O'Kelly, former Irish international rugby union player
- Dara O'Shea, footballer with West Bromwich Albion
- Eric O'Sullivan, Ulster rugby union player
- Mick Pyro, lead singer of the band Republic of Loose
- Rob Rogers, League of Ireland referee
- Rob Smith, musician
- Enda Stevens, footballer with Sheffield United
