= Shan Bullock =

Irish writer (1865–1935)

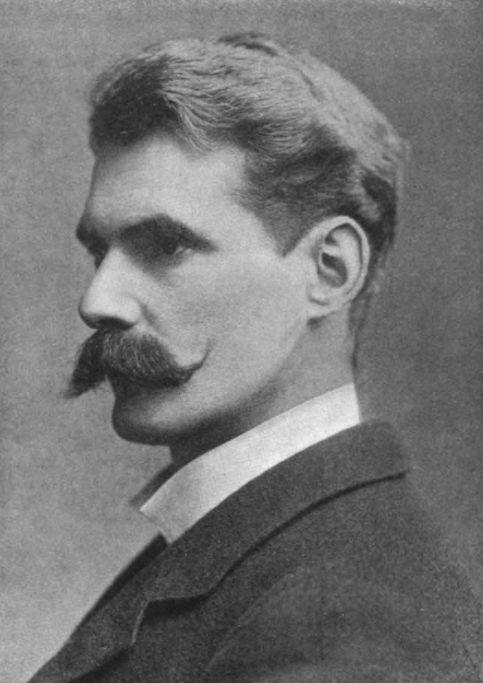
Bullock in 1895

Shan Fadh Bullock (b. John William, 17 May 1865 – 27 February 1935) was an Irish writer. He was born at Inisherk in Fermanagh and died in Surrey. He attended Farra School in County Westmeath, he failed the Trinity College Dublin entrance exams and moved to London. He served on the secretariat of the Irish Home Rule Convention. He was awarded the Order of the British Empire.

Bullock's works include 14 novels, mostly set in Ulster and examples of rural naturalism, but Robert Thorne: The Story of a London Clerk (1907), like two other novels, was a sortie into Edwardian urban realism. In his rural novels, Bullock, himself born a Protestant (Church of Ireland), portrayed Protestants almost exclusively in the Erne country of County Fermanagh. But he grew up in a religiously mixed district and in Dan the Dollar (1906) he explores what he sees as the opposing psychologies of planter Scots and native Irish. By consensus his best novel is The Loughsiders (1924). His non-fiction work includes a biography of the co-designer of RMS Titanic, Thomas Andrews, Shipbuilder (1912). His fiction has been discussed by John Boyd, Benedict Kiely and John Wilson Foster. He was admired by J. M. Barrie and Thomas Hardy.

Bullock played for the Authors Cricket Club.

== Works ==
- The awkward squads and other stories (London : Cassell, 1893.)
- By Thrasna River (London : Ward, Lock & Bowden, 1895.)
- Ring o' rushes (London; New York : Ward, Lock, 1896.)
- The charmer : a seaside comedy (London : J. Bowden, 1897.)
- The Barrys (London; New York : Harper & Brothers, 1899.)
- Irish Pastorals (London : Grant Richards, 1901.)
- The Squireen (London : Methuen, 1903)
- Robert Thorne (London : T. Werner Laurie 1907?)
- Master John (London : Laurie, 1909?)
- Thomas Andrews, shipbuilder (Dublin; and London : Maunsel and company, ltd, 1912.)
- Mors et vita (London : T. Werner Laurie, 1923)
- The Loughsiders (London : G.G. Harrap & co. ltd., 1924.)
- Gleanings (Sutton, Surrey : William Pile, 1926?)
- After sixty years (London : Sampson Low, Marston, 1931?)
