= Kevin Feeney =

Irish judge (1952–2013)

Judge of the High Court
- In office 24 May 2006 – 14 August 2013
- Nominated by: Government of Ireland
- Appointed by: Mary McAleese

Personal details
- Born: 2 February 1952 Dublin, Ireland
- Died: 14 August 2013 (aged 61) Ballycotton, County Cork, Ireland
- Spouse(s): Geraldine Feeney (m. 1979)
- Children: 4
- Education: University College Dublin; King's Inns

Kevin Feeney (2 February 1952 – 14 August 2013) was an Irish judge who served as a Judge of the High Court from 2006 to 2013.

He was educated at Gonzaga College, University College Dublin and the King's Inns. He was called to the Bar in 1973, and became a senior counsel in 1991. He was appointed to the High Court in March 2006. He most notably heard part of the John Gilligan case in 2010. He died suddenly on 14 August 2013 in County Cork.
