= Emma Hannigan =

Irish author and blogger

Emma Denise Hannigan (25 September 1972 – 3 March 2018) was an Irish author and blogger, best known for writing about her experience of suffering from cancer.

== Early life ==
The daughter of Denise, a Montessori teacher who ran a home school, and Philip, manager of a local engineering firm, Hannigan was raised in Bray, County Wicklow. She attended the town's St Gerard's School with her older brother, Timmy. She enjoyed writing, but her favourite teacher ended up having to insist on a word limit.

After leaving school, she attended Ballymaloe Cookery School in Co. Cork for a three-month course, but stayed there for three years. She then worked as a chef and ran her own catering business. She later switched to beauty therapy.

== Cancer and writing ==
With a family history of breast and ovarian cancer, Hannigan's mother and maternal aunt tested positive for the responsible gene, BRCA1. She also received a 'positive' result in August 2005, which carries an 85% risk of developing breast cancer and a 50% risk of ovarian cancer. Hannigan underwent preventative surgery the following year to reduce the risk of cancer developing to 5%. However, breast cancer soon developed, "in the neck, shoulder and under my arm", in 2007. After repeated treatment, a tumour always reappeared. She told Barry Egan of the Irish Independent in the summer of 2016: "The lumps were getting bigger" while "The medicine was making me really sick. Yet it wasn't working". In all, Hannigan's cancer returned another nine times.

Hannigan began to write in the first period while she was in hospital recovering from the (unsuccessful) preventative surgery. She always quickly closed her laptop when her closest friend, the established writer Cathy Kelly, was visiting her. She eventually confessed to Kelly about writing and, after overcoming her anxiety to share her work, emailed her story with the proviso: "If it’s awful, say nothing. We’ll pretend I didn’t give it to you and we’ll never mention it again". Kelly believed Hannigan's work should be published. After sending print outs to several people, Hannigan soon received two offers, and soon afterwards, a contract for three books. Designer Genes, her debut novel, which draws on her experience of illness, was published in Ireland in 2009.

A dozen books followed her debut, including novels and memoirs. The Pink Ladies Club (2011), was on the shortlist for the Eason Irish Popular Fiction Book of the Year category of the 2011 Irish Book Awards.

A fortnight before she died, Hannigan announced on her blog that her cancer was now terminal. After a sales campaign by friends and colleagues, her last book, Letters to My Daughters reached the top of the Nielsen BookScan bestseller list in Ireland at the end of February 2018. All profits from the book will be donated to the Irish Cancer Society.

== Death and legacy ==
Hannigan died on 3 March 2018, aged 45. Irish President, Michael D. Higgins, paid tribute saying she "leaves a lasting legacy" and was "a powerful advocate for Breast Cancer Ireland".

Her husband, Cian McGrath (the couple married in June 1998) and their two children survive her.

It was announced in April 2018 that a cancer research fellowship at the Royal College of Surgeons would be named in her honour.

== Bibliography ==
- Hannigan, Emma (January 2010). Designer Genes. Poolbeg Press. ISBN 978-1842233825.
- Hannigan, Emma (2010). Miss Conceived. Poolbeg Press. ISBN 978-1842234105.
- Hannigan, Emma (2011). Talk to the Headscarf. Piatkus. ISBN 978-0749956486.
- Hannigan, Emma (2011). The Pink Ladies Club. Poolbeg Press. ISBN 978-1842234921.
- Hannigan, Emma (2012). Keeping Mum. Hachette Books Ireland. ISBN 978-1444726176.
- Hannigan, Emma (2013). Driving Home for Christmas. Headline Review. ISBN 978-1472209269.
- Hannigan, Emma (2014). Perfect Wives. Headline Review. ISBN 978-1472209962. (memoir)
- Hannigan, Emma (2014). The Summer Guest. Headline Review. ISBN 978-1472209986.
- Hannigan, Emma (2015). The Secrets We Share. Headline Review. ISBN 978-1472210340.
- Hannigan, Emma (2015). The Heart of Winter. Hachette Books Ireland. ISBN 978-1444797138.
- Hannigan, Emma (2016). The Perfect Gift. Headline Review. ISBN 978-1472230119. (novel)
- Hannigan, Emma (2017). The Wedding Promise: Can a Rambling Spanish villa hold the key to love?. Headline Review. ISBN 978-1472230157.
- Hannigan, Emma (2017). All to Live For: Fighting Cancer, Finding Hope. Headline. ISBN 978-1472250926. (updated version of Talk to the Headscarf)
- Hannigan, Emma (2018). Letters to My Daughters. Hachette Books Ireland. ISBN 978-1473660052.
