= Noel Turley =

Irish international rugby union player

Noel Patrick Turley (13 December 1936 – 12 May 2015) was an Ireland international rugby union player.

Turley also played for Connacht through a parentage qualification and played only once for Ireland on 10 February 1962 in a 16–0 defeat to England in Twickenham.

He was very disappointed not to be capped again.

Turley was a teacher in St_Michael's College Dublin for many years

Turley is remembered annually with a rugby match between St. Michael's and Blackrock schools.
