= Charles Lysaght =

Irish lawyer and writer (born 1941)

Charles Lysaght (born 23 September 1941) is an Irish lawyer, biographer, obituarist and occasional columnist.

== Legal career ==
Lysaght was born in Dublin on 23 September 1941. He was educated at St Michael's College, Dublin and Gonzaga College. He read law and economics at University College Dublin (M.A), and at Christ's College, Cambridge (M.Litt). He qualified as a barrister at the King's Inns, Dublin, and then at Lincoln's Inn, London. A keen student debater he won the inaugural Irish Times Debate for university debating (1960-1) and the gold medal of the Literary and Historical Society in University College Dublin (1961-2). He was elected auditor of the law students debating society of Ireland, King's Inns (1961-2) and president of The Cambridge Union (Easter term 1964), defeating Vince Cable by a large majority.

Between 1967 and 1970 he lectured in law at King's College London and University College London while practising at the Bar. He was part-time professor of law at King's Inns (where he was an honorary bencher) from 1970 to 1975 and joined the Irish Department of External Affairs as a legal adviser in 1970 moving to the Irish Law Reform Commission for 10 years in 1978. From 1981 until 2009, he served on the board of the Irish Civil Service Building Society. Subsequently, he was a member of an Irish government committee on EU Fisheries Policy chaired by Dr T. K. Whitaker and a member of the Advisory Board of the National Archives of Ireland

Since 1969 he has written Irish obituaries for The Times of London. In 2025 he was made a Vice-President of the Literary and Historical Society being elected by a unanimous vote. He shares the role with former Supreme Court Justice Mary Finlay Geoghegan. The Vice Presidency has been held by many well known Irish figures including Adrian Hardiman and Conor Cruise O’Brien.

== Personal ==
A keen cricketer, he played for Pembroke Cricket Club, County Meath, the Cambridge Crusaders, the Refreshers and the Leprechauns, a nomadic club of which he was president in 1998, its 50 anniversary year.

He was first chairman of the Cambridge Society Irish branch and is now chairman of the Oxford and Cambridge Society of Ireland.

He married Alyson Gavin, genealogist, in 2019.

== Bibliography ==
- Administration of Justice in Ireland (1975) by VTH Delany; edited by Charles Lysaght
- Brendan Bracken (Allen Lane, London 1979)
- Edward MacLysaght, 1887-1986: A memoir (1988)
- Great Irish Lives: a book of Times obituaries edited by Charles Lysaght (Harper Collins 2008 2nd ed 2016)

Lysaght has also written articles for learned journals on law and contributed entries to the Dictionary of Irish Biography. He has written forewords to several books and contributes obituaries, articles and book reviews to newspapers and other journals.

== See also ==
- Irish Times Debate
