= Gonzaga College =

Secondary school in Dublin, Ireland

Gonzaga College SJ
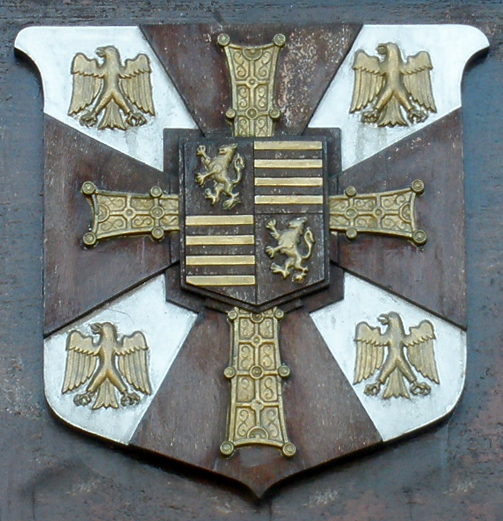
- Arms of the college, based on those of the House of Gonzaga of Mantua

Location
- Sandford Road; Ranelagh, Dublin, Leinster, D06 KF95; Ireland; 53°19′0.52″N 6°14′57.58″W

Information
- School type: Voluntary secondary school
- Motto: Semper et Ubique Fidelis (Always and everywhere faithful)
- Religious affiliations: Roman Catholic, Jesuit
- Founded: 1950; 76 years ago
- School number: +353-1-497-2931
- Principal: Damon McCaul
- Years offered: 1st to 6th
- Gender: Male
- Age range: 12-18
Colour
- School fees: €8,240 (2024–2025)

Gonzaga College SJ is a voluntary Catholic boys' secondary school in Ranelagh, Dublin, Ireland. Founded in 1950, Gonzaga College is under the trusteeship of the Society of Jesus (the Jesuit Order), one of five Jesuit secondary schools in Ireland. The curriculum is traditional, with a broad general programme of subjects including Latin and Greek at Junior Cycle and eight subjects being studied in Senior Cycle for the Leaving Certificate.

The school is named after the early Jesuit Saint Aloysius Gonzaga and takes its emblem from the coat of arms of the Gonzaga family. The school has a liberal, intellectual, and Jesuit ethos.

The annual fee for the 2024–2025 academic year was €8,240.

== Campus ==
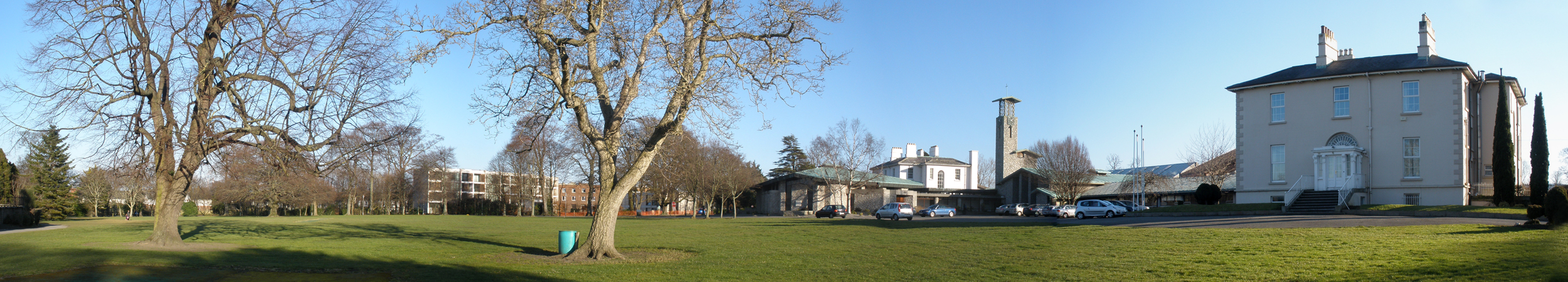
Grounds of Gonzaga College in Ranelagh, Dublin

The school is located 4.4 km (2.7 mi) from Dublin city centre on a large area of land including a front lawn with cricket crease, rugby pitches and tennis courts. The school buildings include a library, chapel, clock tower, theatre, priests' residence, science block, and 84 individual classrooms. The architecture of the school mixes modern copper-roofed buildings with older period houses. Some sections of the school grounds were sold to developers for housing estates in 1984.

In 2007, the school began to work on a major extension project, increasing the size of the school building by 84%. The new building opened to students for the 2009–10 school year.

== Academic performance ==
Gonzaga College has a reputation for academic excellence. The use of examinations to select pupils for admission has been discontinued following government intervention (the state part-funds the school by paying most teachers' salaries), although boys and parents are interviewed ("the interview is a sharing of ideas"). In 2018 it was the top all-boys secondary school in Ireland in terms of the percentage of students who progressed to university, with 85.9% of all students doing so. In 2019, 36.1% of students progressed to UCD, while 38.1% progressed to TCD and 19.6% progressed to TUD.

Visual arts, theatre, and music are emphasised in the curriculum; pupils are encouraged to study Latin and Greek.

== Sports and games ==
=== Sports ===
The primary sport at Gonzaga College is rugby, however many other sports such as hurling, tennis, golf, cricket, badminton, and athletics are also played within the school.

The Junior Cup Rugby teams of 1989, 2003, and 2006 reached the final of the Leinster Schools Junior Cup. The Senior Cup Team (SCT) have reached three semi finals and three finals. The SCT of 2019 reached the final of the Senior Cup for the first time in the college's history, losing to Saint Michael's College. The 2023 team won the school's first ever Senior Cup], beating holders Blackrock with a score of 35–31 on 17 March 2023. They have also won the Senior League (for middle-ranking schools) on several occasions. The school has produced a small number of professional rugby players and seven Irish internationals: Tony Ensor, John Cooney, Barry Bresnihan (who went on to represent the British and Irish Lions), Padraig Kenny, Kevin McLaughlin, Dominic Ryan, and Matt Healy.

The school golf team won Leinster titles in 1999 and 2006. Previously, the team reached the semi-finals of the junior cup. In 2010, the Senior Team won the Leinster Schools Senior Matchplay competition, beating Blackrock College 3½ to 1½. They went on to win the All-Ireland Golf Championship in April 2010.

Gaelic games were not played in the past but, in recent years, a team has been entered in a Gaelic football blitz involving other rugby-playing schools. Hurling has also been introduced in recent years.

The school is occasionally represented by a soccer team in friendly matches, but association football is not an official sport of the school.

The main sports in the college during the summer term are lawn tennis and cricket. Gonzaga College has a strong tennis tradition, producing many of Ireland's finest tennis players including Barry King, Seán Molloy and Jerry Sheehan. The college has also produced three cricket internationals, most recently bowler George Dockrell, as well as Ireland internationals in bridge, lawn bowls and fencing. The school also has a rich history of competition in Ultimate Frisbee, winning several Schools Cups and providing the starting point for many players who have gone on to compete internationally at various age levels.

== Buildings ==
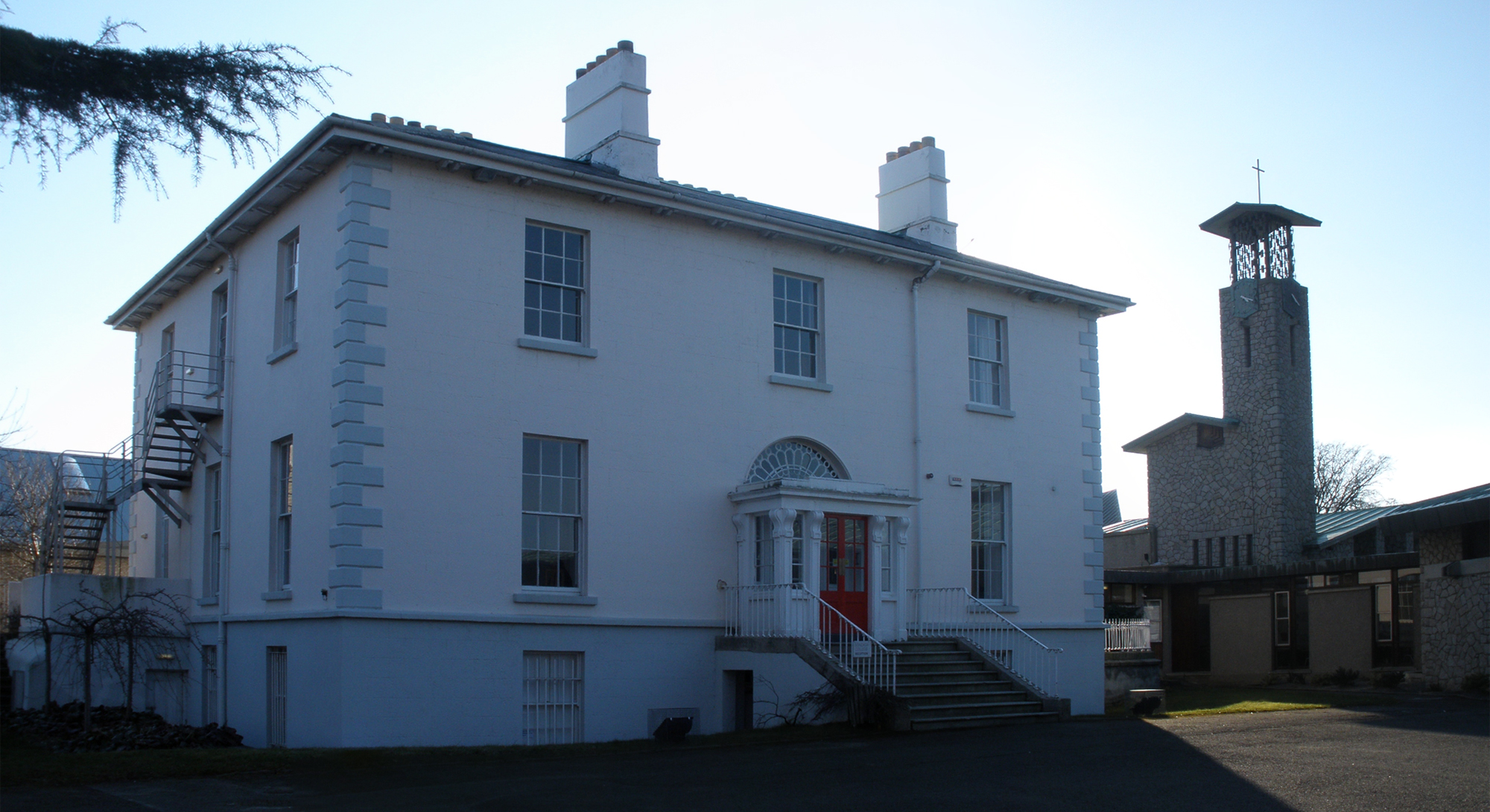
St Joseph's House (classrooms and administration block) and clock tower

Initially the school consisted of the three Bewley buildings on the site, one being used for the school, one as a Jesuit house of residence, and one as a lunch room, changing rooms, science laboratories, etc. In the 1950s, Andrew Devane of Robinson Keefe Devane Architects prepared a masterplan with a school hall between the two main houses and classroom wings extending to the two main houses. The masterplan included a chapel in front of the hall and main entrance. Over the 1950s the classroom wing linked to the school house was built along with the hall and main entrance. In the 1960s the chapel was built. In the 1980s an additional wing of classrooms was constructed. The school's renovation project finished in time for the 2009–10 school year: the first stage was a complete renovation of the science facilities, while the second stage almost doubled the floor area of the school with new buildings. The extension included the new Purdy Dining Hall, the new Coulson Theatre, a gym changing area, and classrooms. The old school hall was completely renovated into a modern library named the Sutherland Library with meeting rooms and study facilities. In 2019–2020 there are tentative plans for a major development of the older section of the school.

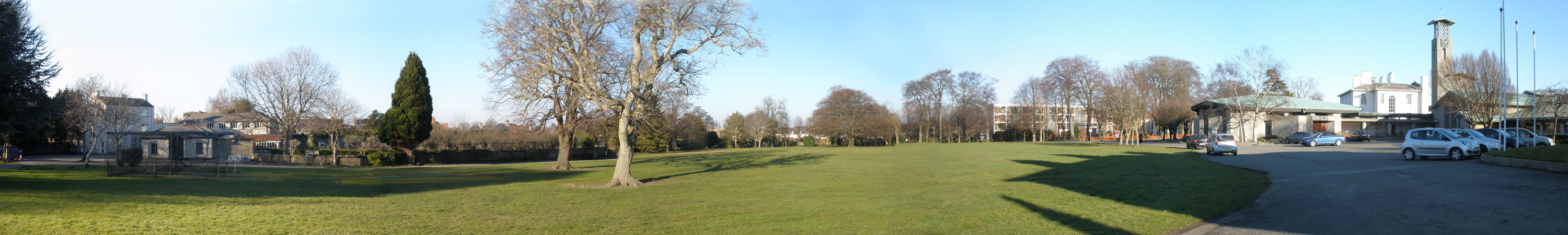
School campus panorama

== Headmasters ==
Fr. William White SJ 1950-65

Fr. Edmond Murphy SJ 1965-67

Fr. Paul Andrews SJ 1967-71

Fr. Hubert Delaney SJ 1971-74

Fr. Dermot Murray SJ 1974-82

Fr. Noel Barber SJ 1982-86

Fr. Peter Sexton SJ 1986-90

Patrick Potts 1990-2007

In 2020, Potts died suddenly several days prior to a court appearance on charges of the sexual abuse of students while he was vice-principal of Greendale Community School, a post he held before becoming headmaster at Gonzaga College. The school commented that it had "never received a complaint directly relating to his tenure at Gonzaga." but that it was aware of one complaint of an unspecified nature which had been made directly to the Garda Síochana. It is not clear if this complaint related to his time in Gonzaga.

Kevin Whirdy 2007-14

Damon McCaul 2014–Present

== Notable past pupils ==
=== Academia ===
- Anthony Clare — psychiatrist and broadcaster
- Peter Clinch — Jean Monnet Professor of European Policy at University College Dublin and economic adviser to former Taoiseach
- George K. Miley — Professor of Astronomy, Leiden University
- Diarmuid Rossa Phelan — Associate Professor, Law, Trinity College Dublin

=== Arts and media ===
- Finghin Collins — concert pianist
- Conor Deasy — lead singer with The Thrills
- Paul Durcan — poet
- Jack Gleeson — actor
- Patrick Gibson - actor
- Manchán Magan — author, traveller, broadcaster and documentary maker
- Aidan Mathews — poet, dramatist, novelist.
- Redmond Morris, 4th Baron Killanin — film producer
- Fionn O'Shea — actor
- Andrew Scott — actor
- Ronan Sheehan — novelist, short story writer, essayist, and former copyright lawyer
- Hugh Tinney — concert pianist
- Corban Walker — sculptor
- Piers Larchet — Art Critic, National Gallery of Ireland

=== Law ===
- Paul Carney — Irish High Court judge
- Kevin Feeney — Irish High Court judge
- Charles Lysaght — lawyer and obituary writer

=== Politics and diplomacy ===
- Patrick Costello — Green Party TD
- Ciarán Cuffe — Green Party MEP and former TD and Minister of State for Horticulture, Sustainable Travel, and Planning and Heritage
- Jim O'Callaghan — Fianna Fáil TD
- Eamon Ryan — Green Party TD and Minister for Communications, Energy and Natural Resources
- Ossian Smyth — Green Party TD and Minister of State for Public Procurement and eGovernment
- Peter Sutherland — EU Commissioner, former director general of the World Trade Organization, former attorney general of Ireland, former chairman of BP and chairman of Goldman Sachs

=== Sports ===
- Barry Bresnihan — former Irish Rugby international, British and Irish Lions player and renowned doctor
- Sam Collins — International Master of chess
- Tony Ensor — Irish rugby international
- Matt Healy - former Connacht Rugby player and Ireland international
- George Dockrell - Ireland Cricket Team

== See also ==
- List of Jesuit schools
- List of Jesuit sites in Ireland
