= Padraic Flanagan =

Irish cricketer

Personal information
- Full name: Padraic James Flanagan
- Born: 9 March 1996 (age 30); Dublin, Leinster, Ireland
- Batting: Right-handed
- Bowling: Right-arm medium-fast

Domestic team information
- Years: Team
- 2020: Cambridge University

Career statistics
Competition	First-class
Matches	1
Runs scored	10
Batting average	5.00
100s/50s	–/–
Top score	8
Balls bowled	187
Wickets	5
Bowling average	16.60
5 wickets in innings	–
10 wickets in match	–
Best bowling	3/30
Catches/stumpings	–/–
- Source: Cricinfo, 6 September 2020

Padraic James Flanagan (born 9 March 1996) is an Irish first-class cricketer.

Flanagan was born at Dublin in March 1996. He was educated at St Michael's College, before going up to Trinity College, Dublin. From Trinity, he studied in England at St Catharine's College at the University of Cambridge. While studying at Cambridge, he made a single appearance in first-class cricket for Cambridge University against Oxford University in The University Match of 2020 at Fenner's. Batting twice in the match, he was dismissed for 8 runs in the Cambridge first innings by Ben Fisher, while in their second innings he was dismissed for 2 runs by Freddie Foster. With his right-arm medium-fast bowling, he bowled 13.1 overs in the Oxford first innings, taking 3 wickets, while in their second innings he took 2 wickets from 18 overs bowled. Alongside Oxford's Will von Behr who also featured in this match, Flanagan was the first Trinity College graduate to feature in The University Match since Thomas Babington Jones in 1874.
