= Temple Carrig School =

Location
- Blacklion; Greystones, County Wicklow, A63KT20; Ireland

Information
- Other name: Temple Carrig Secondary School
- Type: Voluntary secondary school
- Motto: Kindness, Integrity, Endeavour, Adventure
- Religious affiliation: Church of Ireland
- Established: September 2014
- Oversight: Church of Ireland
- Principal: Deborah Crean
- Gender: Mixed
- Houses: Altidore, Avondale, Bellevue, Kilruddery, Powerscourt, Russborrough, Tinakilly
- Colours: Red, gold,
- Website: www.templecarrigschool.ie

Temple Carrig School (also known as Temple Carrig Secondary School) is a mixed, Church of Ireland, voluntary secondary school in Greystones, County Wicklow, Ireland. It was established in September 2014 and is under the patronage of the Church of Ireland. It is the first Church of Ireland voluntary secondary school to be established since the foundation of the Irish Free State.

== Curriculum ==
Students study the Junior Cycle curriculum for their first three years, the Transition Year syllabus (compulsory) for their fourth, and the Leaving Certificate curriculum for their final two.

== Extracurricular activities ==
The school competes at a high level in rugby. The school also plays a range of sports like Hockey, Tennis, Badminton, Athletics and also does a lot of drama productions.

== Controversy ==
In 2015, the school became known for setting up a campaign to oppose the building of a McDonald's fast food outlet opposite; the planning battle was lost but the campaign became popular and the chain subsequently rolled back their plans for the area.

== Leadership ==
In June 2024, the school's board of management appointed Ms Deborah Crean to assume the role of principal from September 2024 after Mr. Alan Cox resigned.
