= Fergus Bourke =

Irish photographer

- Born: July 31, 1934; Bray, County Wicklow, Irish Free State
- Died: October 8, 2004 (aged 70); Ireland
- Education: Presentation College Bray
- Occupation: photographer
- Years active: 1960s–2004
- Known for: street scenes, photo-journalism, portraiture, black-and-white photography
- Spouse: Maureen O'Connor (m. 1963)

Fergus Ignatius Bourke (31 July 1934 – 8 October 2004) was an Irish photographer. He was a member of Aosdána, an association of Irish artists.

== Early life ==
Bourke was born in Bray in 1934 to Eileen (Eibhlín) Bourke (née Somers) and Thomas Bourke (Tómas de Búrca), who was related to Brendan Behan, Kathleen Behan and Peadar Kearney. His younger brother Brian Bourke was a noted painter. Fergus spent some of his childhood in County Wexford, then attended Presentation College Bray. After that he worked a variety of jobs, and was a stuntman in the film King of Kings (1961), filmed in Spain where Bourke was working, as an English teacher.

== Career ==
Each picture was a deceptively simple evocation of a street happening or incident captured in a fraction of a second, within the borders of the classical golden mean rectangle, a rigorous organisation of the elements of the subject matter, a magical coming together of the relevant units, freezing a moment of life that as a statement would exist entirely for its own sake. Is such photography an art form? Yes, I say, when it's in the hands of an artist. Seeing these pictures revealed to me in an instant that the camera could be an instrument of artistic expression. There had been a photographer trapped inside me for so many years and suddenly this book, in one glorious moment of awakening, opened the door. It was a culture shock, but a very pleasant one, like hearing the music of Chopin for the first time. A good black and white print is like music, it has the power to excite you.

— Fergus Bourke, on encountering the work of Henri Cartier-Bresson

On returning to Dublin, Bourke was at a party and picked up a copy Henri Cartier-Bresson's The Decisive Moment (Images à la sauvette), which caused him to develop an interest in black-and-white photography. An exhibition at the Project Arts Centre in Dublin in 1968 led to his work becoming known in the US; the Museum of Modern Art in New York bought seven of his pictures for its permanent collection.

Bourke was renowned as a photographer of Dublin street scenes in the 1960s, depicting the tenements and children's street culture. He worked a photo-journalist, documenting poverty in the 1970s. He was also a portraitist, and documented all major productions in the Abbey Theatre in Dublin between 1970 and 1995.

Bourke was elected to the Irish association of artists, Aosdána, in 1981. He held a major retrospective at the Gallery of Photography in Temple Bar, Dublin in 2003, and later in the Galway Arts Centre.

== Personal life ==
He married Maureen O'Connor, an Irish-American from Maplewood, New Jersey, in 1963; they had four children. They lived in Sandymount, Dublin from 1963 until 1992, when they moved to Connemara in County Galway. Bourke died in 2004; his widow donated his remaining prints to the National Photographic Archive.
