= Farra School =

Former Roman Catholic boys school in County Westmeath, Ireland

Coordinates: 53°30′N 7°30′W

Information
- Established: 1758
- Gender: Boys

Farra School or Farragh College was established in 1758 as a charter school located near Bunbrosna, County Westmeath, Ireland.

The school was set up to provide agricultural instruction to mainly Roman Catholic young boys and men. The school was financed by Reverend William Wilson's will.

William Wilson's uncle, Andrew Wilson, established the Wilson's Hospital School at Heathlands in his will for Church of Ireland boys in 1726.

The first recorded rugby game in Ireland was played at Farra school in Westmeath on 25 February 1879.

Farra School were runners up in the 1887 Rugby Leinster Schools Senior Cup.

The writer and poet Shan Bullock (John William Bullock) attended Farra School.
