= Michael Houlihan =

Irish solicitor and former President of the Law Society of Ireland

Michael Houlihan is a prominent Irish solicitor, Businessman and former President of the Law Society of Ireland. He is noted for his achievements in promoting the development of the south-west region of Ireland.

Born in Ennis, County Clare, from a distinguished legal family, he was educated at Cistercian College, Roscrea, and the Law Society of Ireland.

He was Chairman of Shannon Free Airport Development Company, a Government established regional development body to promote Shannon Airport and the Shannon Region of Ireland.

He was chairman of Shannon Regional Tourism Board until June 2013. He is an Honorary Member of the American Bar Association and a member of the Association of Trial Lawyers of America. He is a member of the International Bar Association and a former chairman of the Litigation Division of the Association.

He is a former member of the Board of The Ireland Funds.

He is a former member of the Governing Authority of the University of Limerick and was Chair of the University's Foundation Board from 2006 to 2014. He is a director of the Limerick University Concert Hall. He was president of the Ennis Chamber of Commerce from 1977 to 1979. He was founding director of Rural Resettlement Ireland Limited, a founding director of Glór Irish Music Centre, a director of Ennis Civic Trust and Kilkee Civic Trust, and founding director of the Céifin Centre.

He was County Solicitor for Clare County Council from 1976 until October 2006.

He was conferred with an Honorary Doctor of Laws by the University of Limerick in April, 2023.
