= James Creedon (journalist) =

Irish journalist and presenter

James Creedon, is an Irish journalist and presenter with France 24, and media editor of their English language network.

Creedon from Bishopstown, in County Cork, attended Cistercian College, Roscrea for his secondary schooling. He went to University College Cork studying French and Law, he completed a diploma in French law at the University of Strasbourg, and gained a Masters from the Institut d'études politiques de Paris. He worked for Irish MEP Patricia McKenna in the European parliament. He has worked for France 24 since 2007, and has also worked for Radio France Internationale.

He has presented MediaWatch, Tech24, Eye on Africa, In the papers, and now presents Truth or Fake, on France 24.

He independently produced (with Elisabeth Feytit) and directed Thanks to your noble shadow - 75 years in Japan, about his cousin Sister Jeannie Paschal O'Sullivan, the last Irish nun in Japan. Made in 2016, Thanks to your noble shadow officially premiered at the 2017 Galway Film Fleadh. A 52-minute version for television, 75 years in Japan, was made in 2019 and broadcast on RTE.
