= De La Salle College Churchtown =

Coordinates: 53°17′48″N 6°15′51″W

De La Salle College
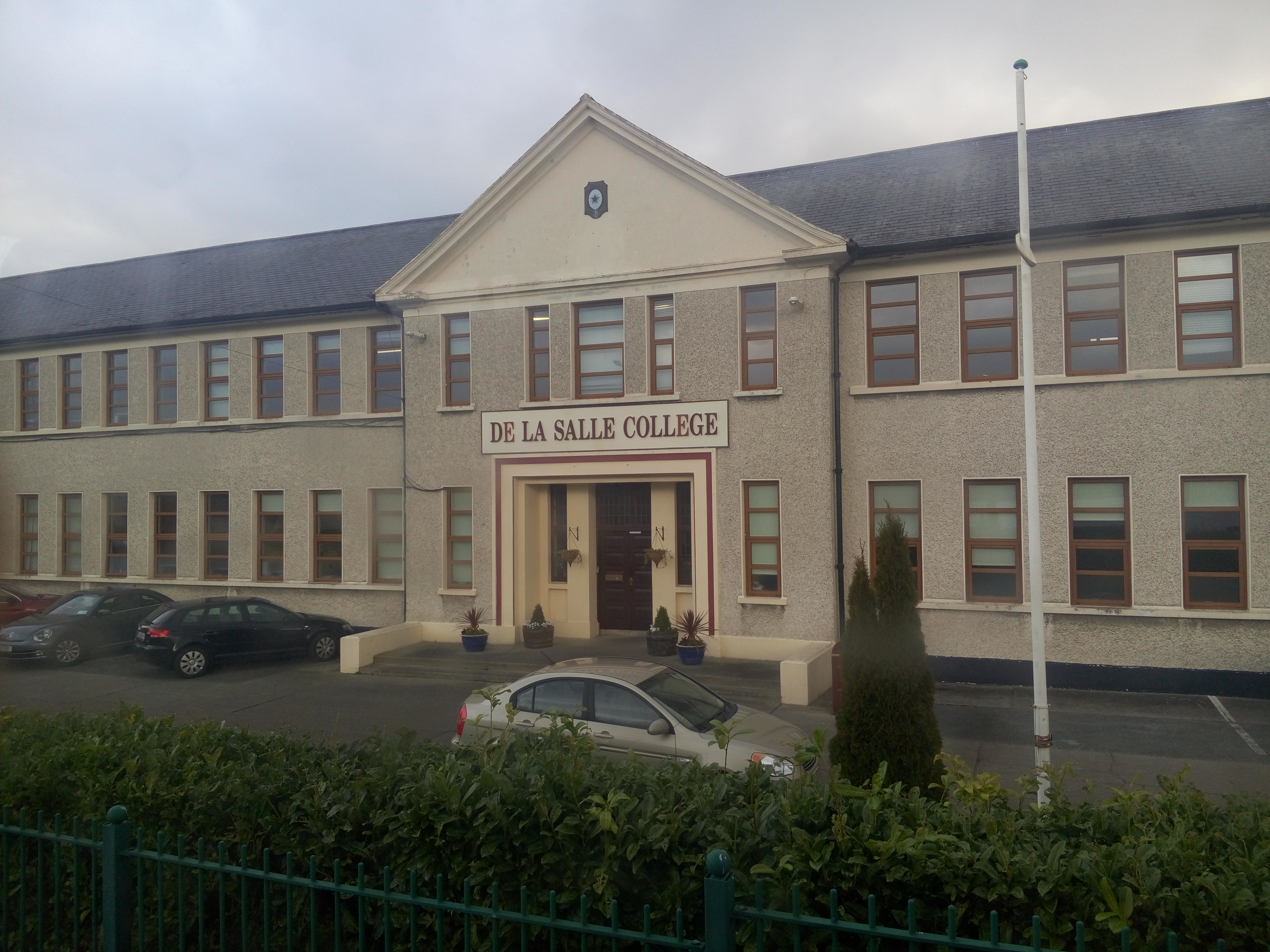
- Churchtown, Dublin 14; Ireland

Information
- Funding type: State school
- Motto: Latin: Recta Sapere; English: Correct Judgement which is interpreted as 'The wisdom to know what is right and the courage to do it'.
- Religious affiliation: Roman Catholic
- Patron saint: Jean-Baptiste de la Salle
- Principal: Siobhán Foster
- Teaching staff: 35
- Gender: Mixed
- Age range: 12-18
- Average class size: 28
- Language: English
- Hours in school day: 6-8hrs
- Colours: Wine and Gold
Sports
Basketball; Golf; Rugby	Athletics; Badminton; Squash
- National ranking: 400+
- Website: De La Salle College

De La Salle College is a co-educational (from 2023 onwards) a Roman Catholic day secondaryschool in Churchtown, Dublin 14, in Ireland. It is a non-fee paying school which has educational facilities to cater for about 500 pupils. The school was officially opened in 1952 and moved to its present location in 1957. Since then, the college was extended in 1986 and 1997 to cater for the increase in the number of pupils. De La Salle College Churchtown is a member of Le Cheile Schools, a Trust for Roman Catholic Schools.

The Brothers of De La Salle are the trustees of the college and it is under the control of a board of management. Siobhán Foster is the principal. There are approximately 35 teachers.

== Sports ==
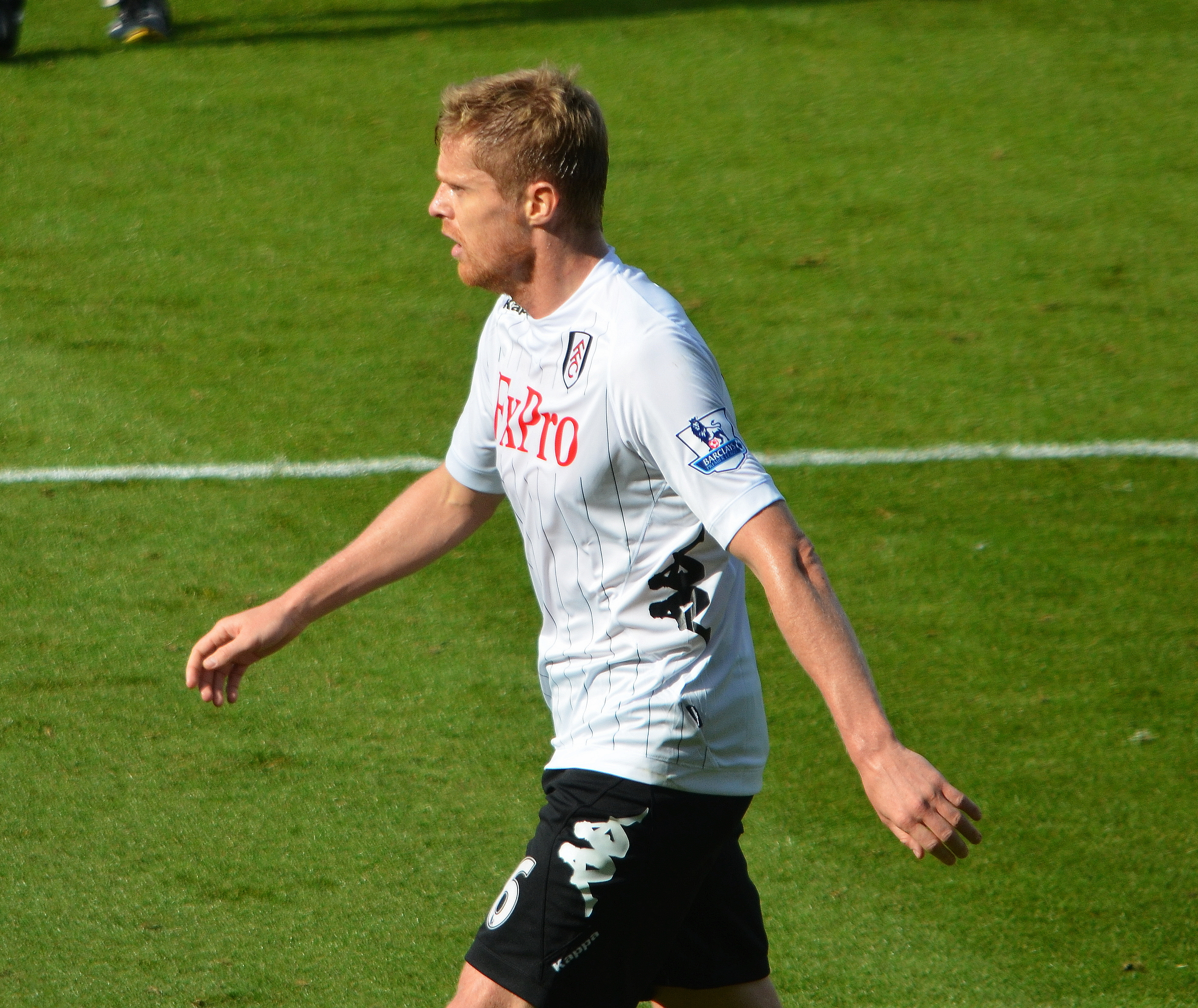
Republic of Ireland soccer player Damien Duff, past pupil of De La Salle Churchtown

The school won the Leinster Schools Rugby Senior Cup in 1983 and 1985.

The school won the Leinster Schools Badminton Senior Cup in 2020.

== Notable alumni ==
- Dermot Keely, Former football player and manager. Former teacher
- Paul O’Donnell, Irish Athletics International
- John Kavanagh, UFC Coach
- John Carney, musician and director of the Oscar-winning film Once
- Damien Duff, footballer with the Ireland national team (retired) and Chelsea in the Premier League
- Brian Stynes, Gaelic footballer
- Jim Stynes, Australian rules footballer
- Tom Vaughan-Lawlor, Actor Love/Hate
- Brian Jennings, RTÉ Newsreader
- Des Fitzgerald, Ireland rugby international, Father of Luke Fitzgerald.
- Niyi Adeolokun, former Connacht rugby player
