= St Mary's College, Dublin =

St. Mary's College C.S.Sp.
- Coláiste Naomh Muire

Location
- Rathmines, Dublin D06 HP38; Ireland; 53.32736°N 6.26722°W

Information
- Type: Voluntary
- Motto: Fidelitas in Arduis (Latin) (Faithful in difficulty)
- Religious affiliations: Catholic; Congregation of the Holy Spirit
- Established: 1890; 136 years ago
- President: Fr. John Flavin C.S.Sp.
- Principal: Denis Murphy
- Faculty: 47 full time 8 part-time
- Years offered: Junior Infants to Sixth Year
- Gender: Boys
- Age range: 4–18
- Enrolment: ~700
- Colours: Blue and White
- Website: stmarys.ie

St Mary's College C.S.Sp. (Congregatio Sancti Spiritus) is a voluntary boys' primary and secondary school run by the Congregation of the Holy Spirit and located in Rathmines, Dublin, Ireland. The school was founded in 1890, closed in 1916, and then reopened in 1926 (from 1917 until 1926 the St. Mary's operated as a House of Philosophy for the Spiritans, before it moved to Blackrock.). The school colours are blue and white.

== Notable past pupils ==
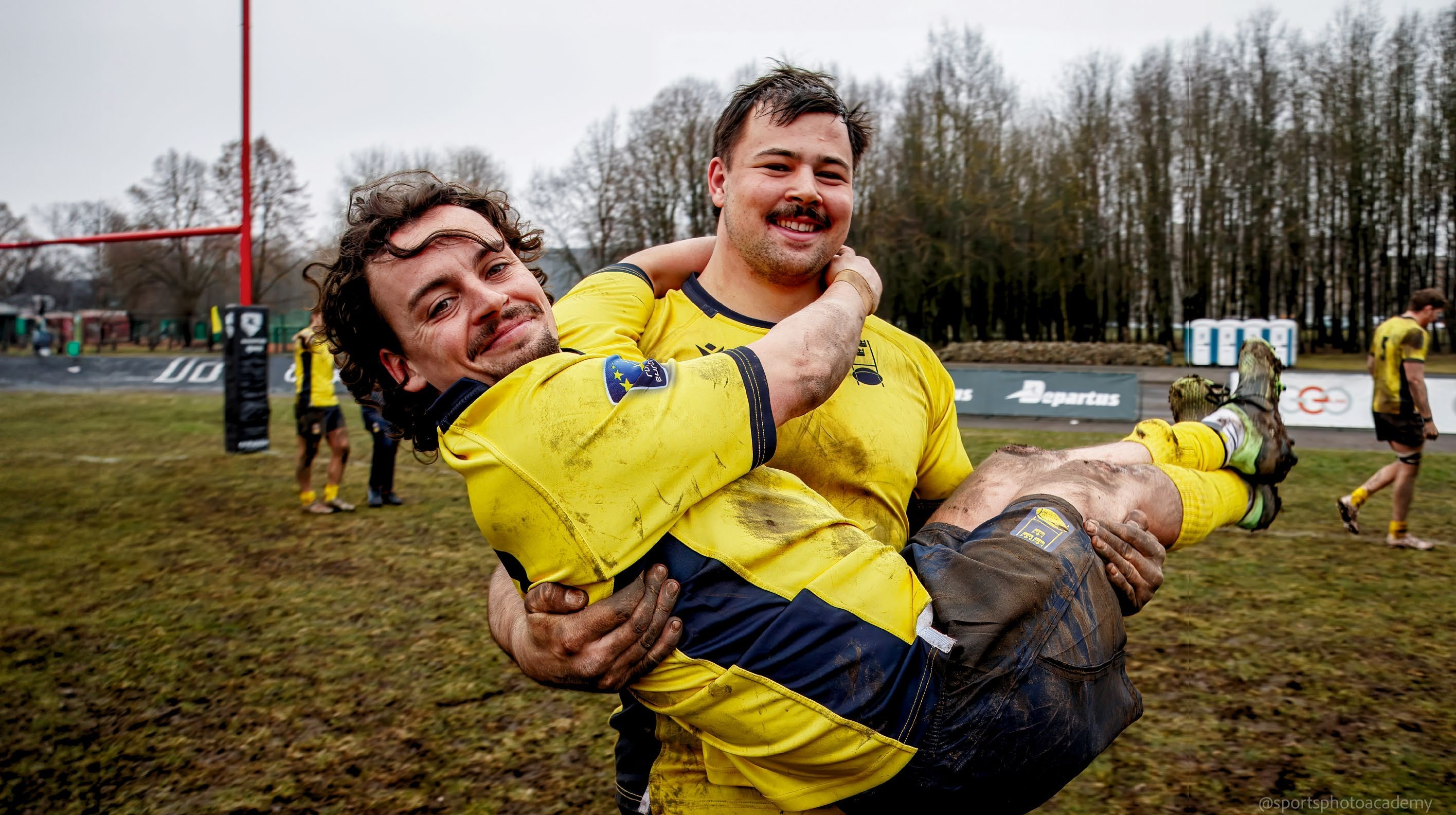
Jack Duffy, Sweden Rugby International

=== Arts and media ===
- Vincent Dowling – Irish-American director

=== Law ===
- Peter Charleton – Judge of the Supreme Court of Ireland
- Nicholas Kearns – Former President of the High Court of Ireland
- Tom O'Higgins – Former Chief Justice of the Supreme Court

=== Politics ===
- Kevin Barry (briefly) – Irish republican (executed in 1920)

=== Sports ===
- Rodney O'Donnell – Former Leinster, Irish and Lions rugby player
- Paul Dean – Former Ireland and Lions rugby player
- Denis Hickie – Former Leinster, Ireland and Lions rugby player
- Shane Jennings – Former Leinster, Leicester Tigers, Barbarians and Ireland rugby player
- Johnny Sexton – Leinster, Racing 92, Ireland and Lions rugby player
- Gareth Delany – Irish cricketer
- Terry Kennedy - Former Ireland Women’s Rugby 7's Player, World Player of the Year

=== Other ===
- Peter Boylan – Former Master of the National Maternity Hospital

== Notable staff ==
- Éamon de Valera – Taoiseach and former president, taught at St. Mary's for a short time in 1915 as a mathematics professor

== Sister schools ==
The following schools were also founded by the Holy Ghost Fathers in Ireland:

- Blackrock College
- Rockwell College
- St. Michael's College
- Templeogue College

== St. Mary's College Rugby Club ==
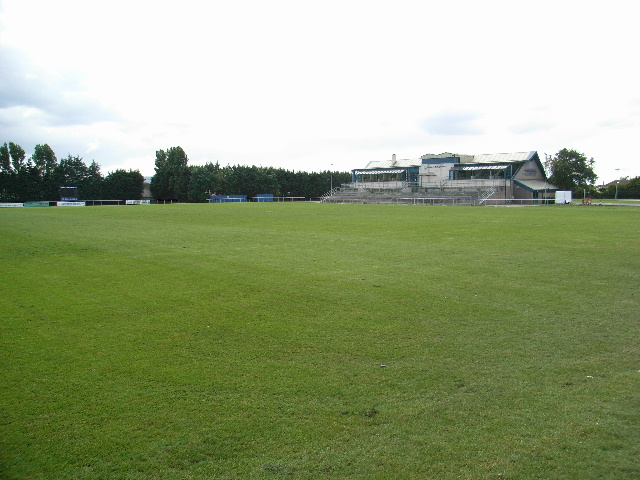
St. Mary's College R.F.C. in Templeogue.

Saint Mary's College C.S.Sp. is directly associated with the St. Mary's College Rugby Club located in Templeogue. The club has been home to several players who represented Leinster and Ireland.
