= James Creedon (politician) =

American politician

James Creedon is a former Secretary of the Pennsylvania Department of General Services.
