= St Gerard's School, Bray =

School in Ireland

St Gerard's School
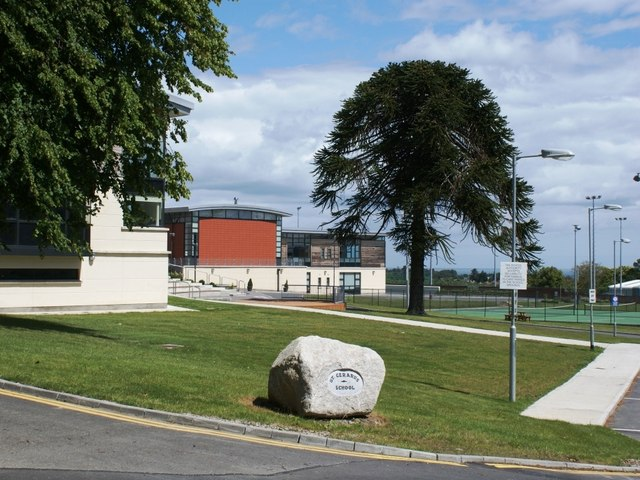

Location
- Bray, County Wicklow, Ireland; 53.20391°N 6.134937°W

Information
- Funding type: Independent
- Motto: Memor (Be mindful)
- Founded: 1918
- Founder: John James
- Headmaster: Victor Drummy, Senior school; Marc Caraher, Junior school
- Gender: Co-educational
- Age range: 2-18
- Enrollment: 620 Senior School 255 Junior School 22 Montessori
- Average class size: 24 Senior School, 26 Junior School
- Campus size: 60 acres
- Colours: Green & Blue
- Song: Our Shining Alma Mater
- Website: stgerards.ie

St Gerard's School is a lay Catholic co-educational independent day school in Bray, County Wicklow, Ireland. A fee-charging school, it is administered by a Board of Directors as a charitable trust.

== History ==
John James founded the school in 1918. After completing his university degree in 1904 he converted to the Roman Catholic faith. His vision of education emphasized "the dignity of each individual and the development of the whole person". The school is named after Gerard Majella, patron saint of the school.

== Notable alumni ==
- Charley Boorman, actor
- Jack Conan, Ireland rugby union international
- Emma Hannigan, author and blogger
- John Harbison, first State Pathologist of Ireland
- Andrew Hozier-Byrne, musician
- Louis le Brocquy, artist
- Frank O'Reilly, Irish banker, businessman
- Tony Smurfit, CEO of Smurfit Kappa
- Elena Tice, dual Ireland women's cricket and field hockey international

== See also ==
- Education in the Republic of Ireland
