= Cistercian College, Roscrea =

Catholic secondary school in County Offaly, Ireland

Cistercian College Roscrea
- Coláiste Cisteirseach Ros Cré
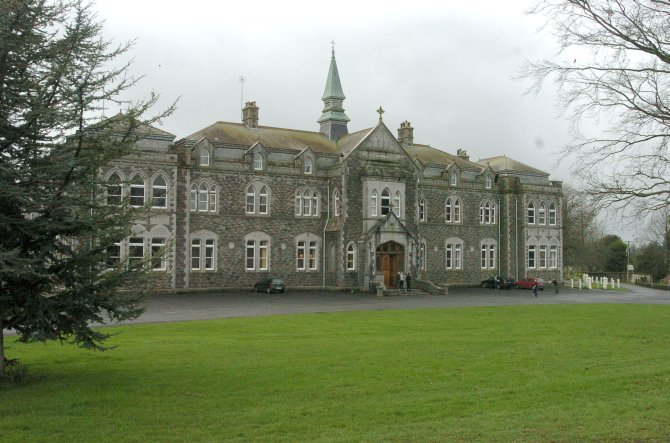

Location
- Roscrea, County Offaly, E53DX37; Ireland
- Coordinates: 52°57′43″N 7°51′18″W

Information
- Type: Private (fee-paying)
- Motto: A Place to Grow
- Religious affiliation: Trappists
- Established: 1905
- School code: 65410K
- Principal: Catherine Smyth
- Gender: Male (becoming coeducational in September 2026)
- Age range: 12–19
- Enrollment: 279
- Language: English
- Colours: Black and white
- Superior: Dom. Malachy Thompson
- Website: ccr.ie

Cistercian College, Roscrea (CCR; also called Roscrea College) is a private boarding school in Ireland. It is a Roman Catholic seven-day and five-day boarding and day school for boys, founded in 1905. Its pupil population is primarily made up of boarding students with some day students also attending. In May 2025 it was announced that from 2026 the school will become co-educational.

== Location ==
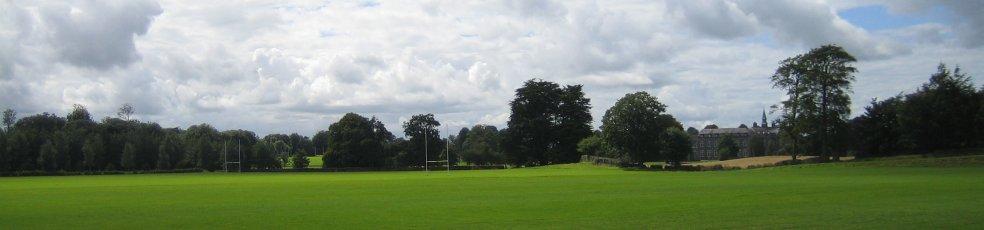
College grounds

Located within the grounds of Mount St. Joseph Abbey in County Offaly, Ireland, 2.5 miles (4.0 km) west of Roscrea town, the school is managed by monks of the Trappist branch of the Cistercians. Surrounded by open wooded countryside and thirty acres of grounds and sports fields, it also adjoins the abbey's farm of 360 ha (890 acres).

While County Tipperary is in Munster, the school does not play in Munster competitions. This is because the original property and lands are Mount Heaton House (now the guesthouse) and demesne in the townland of Ballyskenagh, which is actually in the territory of Ely O'Carroll in County Offaly (formerly Kings County). The house, school, abbey, farm and playing fields are just across the county border from County Tipperary, and so the school plays its sport in Leinster competitions. Roscrea is the nearest large town and so the postal address is Roscrea, County Tipperary.

== History ==
The school was founded by the Cistercian monks in 1905 as a monastic boarding school for boys and has educated students from all over Ireland and overseas. CCR is one of two monastic schools in Ireland and in 1990 a Board of Governors was appointed by the Abbot to govern the administration of the college.

In the 17th century, Dr Richard Heaton, a Yorkshire-born Church of Ireland clergyman and botanist, mortgaged the land, and his son Edward built the house on the remnants of a castle and renamed it Mount Heaton. In 1877 it was in the ownership of the nationalist and Home Rule-supporting MP, the Catholic Count Arthur John Moore. Moore donated the six hundred-acre property, a mansion and its walled garden to the Cistercians. The Cistercians moved into Roscrea from their abbey at Mount Melleray in February 1878. The church, built using a foundation stone from Roman Catacombs in 1879 was finally completed in 1881.

=== Centennial ===
The college celebrated its centenary year from September 2005 until September 2006, giving rise to many events, visits and talks from notable past students and their connections. The speakers included; President of Ireland Mary McAleese, Dick Spring, Brian Cowen, Mary Hanafin and Charlie McCreevy.

=== Closure risk and recovery ===
In February 2017 it was announced that the school would cease taking new enrollments due to financial difficulties caused by falling student numbers. However, following a public meeting attended by over 300 people, an action group made up of parents and past pupils was formed. The group was charged with raising funds to supplement the school's finances and developing a long term strategy to make the school self-sustaining again. Progress was made, and on 16 March 2017 it was announced that the school would remain open after funding was secured by past pupils and parents.

Following on from the fundraising, donations from former pupils and financial changes which saved the school from closure, as of 2017 Cistercian College was to offer scholarships to students who excel in a number of academic subjects and sports to cover 50% of school fees.

== Ethos ==
The influence of Abbey is an integral part of the college and daily life is influenced by the presence of the few remaining Cistercian monks. Though most of the school's current teaching staff are now lay-persons, a tiny number of Cistercian monks and brothers take part in the school's administration and chaplaincy. The college aspires to be a "Christian community of learning, a worshipping community with an awareness of the presence of God in daily life and in the preparation of pupils for adult life".

== Extra-curricular activities ==
=== Sports ===
Pupils have the opportunity to receive coaching and compete in a number of sports. Team games are served by the facilities that include:

- Playing fields (rugby, hurling, gaelic football, and soccer)
- An all-weather pitch
- Heated indoor swimming pool
- Basketball court
- Tennis courts
- Gymnasium

The school's sports complex provides indoor facilities for a range of sporting activities.

The main sports played are rugby and hurling during the autumn and spring and athletics during the late spring and early summer. The school's sporting colours are black and white. The school has produced professional rugby players, county hurlers and representatives on the Irish athletics team including in hammer and hurdles.

On St. Patrick's Day 2015, Cistercian College Roscrea's Senior Cup Team won the school's first ever Leinster Schools' Senior Challenge Cup. Roscrea are one of the oldest participants in the competition, going back to at least 1910, when they played in that years final. The school has a national and international reputation for sporting achievement.

The students have access to a 9-hole golf course. A golf team participates each year in competition.

Horse riding is also undertaken in the college as well as show jumping, where students have represented the country at international competitions.

=== Debating and public speaking ===
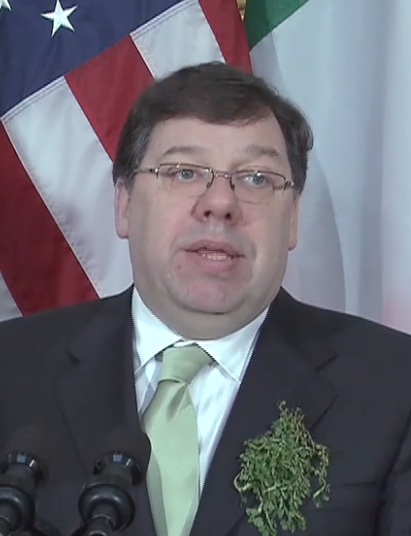
Former Taoiseach Brian Cowen, past pupil

Irish, English and German-language debating teams compete each year from Cistercian College. They have won several competitions, including the all-Ireland debating competition Comórtas a Phiarsaigh in 2010 and the GDI All-Ireland German Debating Competition in 2013 and 2019. In-house public speaking competitions take place each year, with the Silver Medal being awarded to the winner from Third Year, and the Gold Medal to the winner from Sixth Year.

== Noted past pupils ==
- Conor Brady – former editor of The Irish Times
- James Creedon – reporter for France24
- Michael Houlihan – former president of the Law Society of Ireland
- Augustine Martin (known as "Gus" Martin) – senator, professor of Anglo-Irish Literature at UCD, broadcaster and scholar

Politics

- David Andrews – former Minister for Foreign Affairs
- Barry Cowen – former Minister for Agriculture, Food and the Marine, TD
- Brian Cowen – former Taoiseach; Barry's brother
- Jim Glennon – international rugby player; former TD
- Dick Spring – international rugby player; former Tánaiste

Sport

- Gavin Duffy – international rugby player
- Ciaran Gaffney – rugby player for Connacht and Zebre
- Barry Glendenning – football journalist with The Guardian
- Jim Glennon – see "politics"
- Séamus Hennessy – All-Ireland medallist with the Tipperary senior hurling team
- Cormac Izuchukwu – rugby player for Ulster and Ireland
- Tadhg Leader – former rugby player and former place kicker for the Hamilton Tiger Cats
- Willie Mullins – racehorse trainer and former jockey
- Seán O'Brien – rugby player for Connacht
- Tiernan O'Halloran – rugby player for Connacht
- Dick Spring – see "politics"

Music

- Filippo Bonamici aka Fil Bo Riva – musician

== See also ==
- Mount St. Joseph Abbey
