= Voluntary secondary school =

Type of private school in Ireland

In education in Ireland, a voluntary secondary school (or privately-owned secondary school (Note: In official contexts in Ireland, "secondary school/education" refers specifically to voluntary secondary schools, whereas "post-primary school/education" is the umbrella term including other types of second-level education); Irish: scoil dheonach) is a post-primary school that is privately owned and managed, while being partly government-funded. Most are denominational schools, and the managers are often Catholic Church authorities, especially in the case of Catholic schools. Like national schools at primary level, voluntary secondary schools are supported by the Department of Education, on a per capita basis. Approximately 90% of teachers' salaries are met by the state. Some schools charge tuition fees, while many others request top-up funding or voluntary fee contributions from parents. The local community may also be involved in fund raising.

Until 1966, all post-primary schools were voluntary secondary schools except for "vocational schools" run by Vocational Education Committees (now "community colleges" run by Education and Training Boards). The raising of the school leaving age by Donogh O'Malley triggered the creation of publicly managed "community schools" and "comprehensive schools". Some smaller secondary schools subsequently merged with each other or with the public schools. Voluntary secondary schools still form the largest part of the post-primary school system and are attended by about 60% of post-primary education students.

The schools are generally managed by a Board of Management or less often a patron or religious institute. A school principal is in general control of everyday business. Some voluntary secondary schools are boarding schools; especially Protestant schools, many of which are Church of Ireland, whose catchment area is beyond commuting distance due to the sparse distribution of the Protestant population; such schools generally receive additional grants to the normal per capita grant.

The decline in membership of Catholic religious orders, including teaching orders, has prompted rationalisation in the Catholic voluntary sector. CEIST, established in 2007, is the trustee for over 100 Catholic secondary schools. Since the 2010s there has been debate about Catholic "divestment" of schools—their transfer from Catholic patrons to multi-denominational patrons, or to the public sector. However, this mainly relates to primary national schools rather than to secondary schools.

== Sources ==
- "Types of post-primary school". Citizens Information. Citizens Information Board. 27 June 2013.
