= Frewen Cup =

Gaelic football competition

- Irish: Corn an Fhriúnnaigh
- Code: Gaelic football
- Founded: 1936; 89 years ago
- Region: Munster (GAA)
- Trophy: Frewen Cup
- No. of teams: 8
- Title holders: St Brendan's College (15th title)
- First winner: Dingle CBS
- Most titles: Coláiste Chríost Rí (16 titles)
- Sponsors: TUS
- Official website: Official website

The Frewen Cup is an annual inter-schools Gaelic Football competition organised by the Munster PPS division of the Gaelic Athletic Association (GAA). Sometimes referred to throughout its history as the Munster Colleges Junior Football Championship or the Munster PPS Under-17 A Football Championship, it has been contested since 1936.

The final, typically held in November, serves as the culmination of a knockout series of games played between October and November. Eligible players must be under the age of 17.

As of 2025, 8 teams participate in the Frewen Cup. The title has been won at least once by 22 different schools, 13 of which have won the title more than once. Coláiste Chríost Rí are the all-time title record-holders with 16 titles.

St Brendan's College are the 2026 champions, having beaten Clonakilty Community College by 3-07 to 0-15 in the final.

== History ==
Since 1927, the Munster Cup had been organised by the Munster Colleges Council and contested as a provincial senior Gaelic football competition. Following the establishment of a provincial junior hurling competition for players under the age of 16 at the annual Munster Colleges Council convention in February 1936, it was later decided to establish a similar competition for Gaelic football. The Fr Lee Cup was the prize for the inaugural competition, before the Frewen Cup was first presented in 1937 and named in honour of Robert J. Frewen. Dingle CBS were the first champions after a 3–07 to 2–00 defeat of Thurles CBS in the inaugural final in May 1936.

== List of finals ==
Year	Winners	Score	Runners-up	Score
1948	Coláiste Íosagáin		Dungarvan CBS	
1949	Coláiste Íosagáin			
1950	St Francis College Rochestown	2-07	Coláiste Íosagáin	0-03
1951	Coláiste Íosagáin	3-09	St Francis College Rochestown	0-05
1952	Coláiste Íosagáin	2-09	St Therese College	1-04
1953	Coláiste Íosagáin	2-03	St Therese College	0-05
1954	Tralee CBS	1-04	St Augustine's College	0-04
1955	Coláiste Íosagáin	1-04	DLS College Waterford	2-00
1956	St Augustine's College	1-04	Coláiste Íosagáin	0-05
1957	Limerick CBS	0-06	St Augustine's College	1-01
1958	DLS College Waterford	3-11	Coláiste Chríost Rí	1-10
1959	St Augustine's College	2-05	North Monastery	0-06
1960	Coláiste Chríost Rí	4-06	St Brendan's College	1-01
1961	Coláiste Chríost Rí	w/o	St Brendan's College	scr.
1962	DLS College Waterford	0-07	St Brendan's College	0-04
1963	Coláiste Chríost Rí	2-11	DLS College Waterford	0-06
1964	DLS College Waterford	6-06	Salesian College, Pallaskenry	2-02
1965	DLS College Waterford	6-05	Salesian College, Pallaskenry	1-01
1966	St Brendan's College	3-13	DLS College Waterford	1-06
1967	Coláiste Chríost Rí	1-06	Coláiste Íosagáin	0-06
1968	St Brendan's College	0-07	Coláiste Íosagáin	0-03
1969	Tralee CBS	3-05	Coláiste Chríost Rí	2-07
1970	Coláiste Íosagáin	2-11	DLS College Waterford	3-07
1971	Coláiste Chríost Rí	1-10	North Monastery	1-07
1972	Coláiste Chríost Rí	4-06	St Brendan's College	2-08
1973	Coláiste Iognáid Rís	1-08	Coláiste Chríost Rí	0-08
1974	St Brendan's College	2-09	Coláiste Iognáid Rís	1-06
1975	Tralee CBS	1-08	Coláiste Iognáid Rís	0-04
1976	Coláiste Chríost Rí	2-06	Coláiste Iognáid Rís	0-07
1977	Coláiste Chríost Rí	3-07	Coláiste Íosagáin	1-05
1978	Coláiste Chríost Rí	4-08	St Flannan's College	1-10
1979	St Brendan's College	1-11	St Flannan's College	0-08
1980	North Monastery	1-11	Coláiste Iognáid Rís	1-03
1981	Coláiste Iognáid Rís	0-12	DLS College Waterford	0-04
1982	Tralee CBS	1-11	DLS College Waterford	2-01
1983	North Monastery	2-04	Coláiste Chríost Rí	0-06
1984	St Brendan's College	2-06	Coláiste Chríost Rí	0-10
1985	Coláiste Chríost Rí	6-12	DLS College Waterford	1-05
1986	Coláiste Chríost Rí	5-06	Coláiste Iognáid Rís	1-06
1987	Coláiste Chríost Rí	1-06	St Brendan's College	1-05
1988	Tralee CBS	2-12	Midleton CBS	0-05
1989	North Monastery	5-05	Coláiste Chríost Rí	2-05
1990	St Brendan's College	4-07	Coláiste Chríost Rí	1-06
1991	Coláiste Chríost Rí	0-11	Tralee CBS	0-08
1992	Coláiste Chríost Rí	2-08	St Finbarr's College	1-09
1993	Coláiste Chríost Rí	2-05	St Colman's College	1-06
1994	Intermediate School Killorglin	3-07	St Colman's College	1-10
1995	St Brendan's College	3-07	St Colman's College	1-09
1996	Tralee CBS	1-06	St Colman's College	1-05
1997	Tralee CBS	w/o	St Flannan's College	scr.
1998	St Brendan's College	3-10	Coláiste Chríost Rí	2-11
1999	St Flannan's College	2-11	Tralee CBS	2-05
2000	Intermediate School Killorglin	2-07	Coláiste Chríost Rí	0-08
2001	Coláiste Choilm	3-08	Intermediate School Killorglin	1-13
2002	Coláiste Choilm	3-08	St Brendan's College	2-09
2003	Coláiste na Sceilge	1-07	St Flannan's College	0-09
2004	Coláiste na Sceilge	2-09	Tralee CBS	2-08
2005	Tralee CBS	5-07	DLS College Waterford	1-07
2006	Tralee CBS	2-13	Coláiste Choilm	0-06
2007	St Brendan's College	3-13	Tralee CBS	2-11
2008	Tralee CBS	2-10	CBS High School Clonmel	1-05
2009	St Flannan's College	1-10	CBS High School Clonmel	1-09
2010	St Brendan's College	1-14	CBS High School Clonmel	0-11
2011	Tralee CBS	1-11	St Flannan's College	1-10
2012	Pobalscoil Chorca Dhuibhne	0-08	CBS High School Clonmel	0-07
2013	Pobalscoil Chorca Dhuibhne	0-10	CBS High School Clonmel	2-02
2014	St Francis College Rochestown	3-12	St Brendan's College	2-14
2015	St Brendan's College	1-13	Tralee CBS	1-09
2016	Coláiste Chríost Rí	2-10	St Flannan's College	2-07
2017	Pobalscoil Chorca Dhuibhne	1-15	St Brendan's College	0-12
2018	St Brendan's College	2-15	St Flannan's College	1-08
2019	Intermediate School Killorglin	3-14	St Flannan's College	1-09
2020	St Brendan's College	1-14	Tralee CBS	2-07
2021	Cancelled due to the COVID-19 pandemic			
2022	Mercy Secondary School, Mounthawk	3-11	St Flannan's College	0-07
2023	Tralee CBS	3-11	St Francis College	2-09
2024	Tralee CBS	3-16	St Patrick's Secondary School	0-09
2025	St Brendan's College	2-13	Clonakilty Community College	0-11
2026	St Brendan's College	3-07	Clonakilty Community College	0-15

Notes

- 1979 - The first match ended in a draw: St Brendan's College 0-09, St Flannan's College 0-09.
- 1985 - The first match ended in a draw: Coláiste Chríost Rí 1-05, DLS College Waterford 2-02.

== See also ==
- Corn Uí Mhuirí
- Dean Ryan Cup
