= Mickey O'Sullivan =

Irish Gaelic football player (born 1952)

Mickey "Ned" O'Sullivan
Personal information
- Native name: Micheál Ó Suilleabháin (Irish)
- Nickname: Ned
- Born: 14 April 1952 (age 74) Kenmare, County Kerry, Ireland
- Occupation: Retired secondary school teacher
- Height: 5 ft 9 in (175 cm)

Sport
- Sport: Gaelic football
- Position: Left wing-forward
Clubs
- Years: Club
- Kenmare; Kenmare District
Club titles
- Kerry titles: 2
Inter-county
Years	County	Apps (scores)
1971–1978	Kerry	17 (4–17)
Inter-county titles
- Munster titles: 5
- All-Irelands: 3
- NFL: 3
- All Stars: 1

Mickey "Ned" O'Sullivan (born 14 April 1952) is an Irish former Gaelic football manager, selector and former player. His league and championship career at senior level with the Kerry county team spanned ten seasons from 1971 to 1980.

Born in Kenmare, County Kerry, O'Sullivan was educated at Coláiste Íosagáin in Ballyvourney where he played Gaelic football. He later played with University College Dublin during his studies there. By this stage O'Sullivan had also joined the Kenmare club team, with whom he won three county intermediate championship medals. He also lined out with the Kenmare District divisional side, and won two county senior championship medals.

O'Sullivan made his debut on the inter-county scene at the age of eighteen when he was selected for the Kerry minor team. He enjoyed one championship season with the minor team, however, he was an All-Ireland runner-up in 1970. O'Sullivan subsequently joined the Kerry under-21 team, winning an All-Ireland medal as captain in 1973. By this stage he had also joined the Kerry senior team, making his debut during the 1970–71 league. Over the course of the next ten seasons, O'Sullivan won three All-Ireland medals, beginning as captain in 1975 and ending with victories as a non-playing substitute in 1978 and 1980.

== Biography ==
Mickey 'Ned' O'Sullivan was born in Kenmare, County Kerry in 1952. He was educated at the local national school before later attending the Irish-speaking Coláiste Íosagáin in Ballyvourney, County Cork, to which he returned in the 1970's as a PE and Geography teacher. After completing his Leaving Certificate, O'Sullivan travelled to London where he studied physical education at St. Mary's University. He subsequently completed his H.Dip. in education at University College Dublin. During his tenure here O'Sullivan played on the college football team in the Sigerson Cup.

O'Sullivan subsequently returned to Kenmare and later took a part time teaching post in Scoil Ghobnatan in Ballyvourney, teaching Geography to the students and, in recent years, becoming a guidance counsellor. He has also run an award-winning restaurant and a bar in Kenmare town.

O'Sullivan married Marian King in 1977 and together they have two children – Éamonn (born 1979) and Bryan born (1982).

== Playing career ==
=== Club ===
O'Sullivan played his club football with his local club in Kenmare and enjoyed much success.

At underage level O'Sullivan won a Towns Cup title in 1968, before later winning three intermediate county championships in 1968, 1970 and 1972. While O'Sullivan cherished these victories, much more was to follow at senior level.

In 1972 O'Sullivan won a Kerry County Football League Division 1 title. Two years later he lined out in his first county championship final. North Kerry divisional side Shannon Rangers provided the opposition on that occasion. Kenmare ended the game as champions and O'Sullivan picked up a county winners' medal. It was also the club's first triumph in this grade.

After surrendering their title in 1975, Kenmare were back in the county championship final the following year. O'Sullivan's side were trounced by Austin Stacks on a scoreline of 1–14 to 0–7. It was a defeat that would take a large toll on the club's hopes of further county titles.

In 1987 O'Sullivan was entering the twilight of his club football career. Nevertheless he was still a key member of the Kenmare team that reached a third county final. Dr. Crokes of Killarney were the opponents. Kenmare triumphed and O'Sullivan added a second and final county winners' medal to his collection.

=== Minor and under-21 ===
O'Sullivan first came to prominence on the inter-county scene as a member of the Kerry minor football team in 1970. That year he lined out in the minor provincial decider against Cork. The Kerrymen recorded a comprehensive victory, giving O'Sullivan a Munster winners' medal in the minor grade. Kerry later booked their place in the All-Ireland final against Galway. In a tense encounter both sides finished level and a replay was required. That game was also a close affair with the result remaining in doubt right up until the final whistle. In the end O'Sullivan's side were defeated by a single point as Galway took the title.

O'Sullivan later joined the Kerry under-21 team where he also enjoyed some success at the highest levels of that grade. In 1972 he missed Kerry's provincial decider triumph, however, he returned in time for the clash against Galway in the All-Ireland final. Both sides gave admirable displays but Galway came away with the victory, scoring two key goals making the final score read 2–6 to 0–7 in favour of the Connacht team.

In 1973 O'Sullivan's side reached the provincial under-21 final again. A close 2–12 to 1–12 score line gave Kerry the win and gave O'Sullivan his first Munster winners' medal in this grade. While he had been captain for the Munster final, O'Sullivan relinquished this position for the subsequent All-Ireland showdown with Mayo. Goals cost Kerry the final the previous year, however, the team had learned from their mistakes. A 2–13 to 0–13 score line gave Kerry the win and gave O'Sullivan an All-Ireland under-21 winners' medal.

=== Senior ===
By this stage O'Sullivan had established himself on the Kerry senior team. In 1972 Kerry reached the final of the National Football League and faced Mayo at Croke Park. Kerry had a relatively easy 2–11 to 1–9 victory and O'Sullivan claimed his first national title at senior level. He was later a non-playing substitute as Kerry went on to claim the Munster title but lose the All-Ireland final to Offaly after a draw and a replay.

Two more National League titles followed for O'Sullivan in 1973 and 1974, however, archrivals Cork claimed the Munster title in both years.

Things began to change in 1975 as Mick O'Dwyer took over as Kerry manager and O'Sullivan was appointed captain for the year. While 'the Kingdom' had played second fiddle to Cork over the previous two years, O'Sullivan's side smashed 'the Rebels' in that year's Munster final. A huge 1–14 to 0–7 scoreline gave Kerry the win and gave O'Sullivan his first Munster title on the field of play. The Kenmare man later lined out in his first senior All-Ireland final. Reigning champions Dublin provided the opposition and were installed as the red-hot favourites over the youngest Kerry team of all-time. On a rain-soaked day John Egan and substitute Ger O'Driscoll scored two goals and 'the Dubs' were ambushed by 2–12 to 0–11. In spite of claiming the championship the final was a disappointing affair for O'Sullivan as he became the only All-Ireland winning captain since the Sam Maguire Cup was first presented not to collect the famous trophy. He was knocked unconscious seventeen minutes into the first-half and woke up in a Dublin hospital when the match was long finished. O'Sullivan was awarded his only All Star award at the end of the year.

In 1976 O'Sullivan captured his second Munster title following a draw and a replay with Cork. A second consecutive All-Ireland final appearance quickly followed as Kerry faced Dublin once again. New 'Dub' Kevin Moran was causing havoc with the Kerry defence. Immediately after the game started he careered through the Kerry half-back and full-back lines but his shot at goal went wide. This set the pace for the rest of the match. John McCarthy finished a five-man move to score Dublin's first goal of the day. A converted penalty by Jimmy Keaveney was followed by a third goal from Brian Mullins. Kerry surrendered their All-Ireland title as Dublin prevailed by 3–8 to 0–10.

Following the 1976 defeat O'Sullivan took a break from the game because of a loss of form. He lived in the United States for a year before returning to Ireland at the end of 1977. By 1978 O'Sullivan was back as a member of the Kerry senior football panel. He played just a few championship games over the next few years because he was unable to hold down a regular place on what was quickly becoming the greatest football team of all-time.

O'Sullivan was a non-playing substitute as Kerry won another set of Munster and All-Ireland titles again in 1978. He opted out of the game again in 1979 but returned in 1980 to win another pair of Munster and All-Ireland medals as a non-playing substitute once again. O'Sullivan retired from inter-county football at the end of 1980.

=== Inter-provincial ===
O'Sullivan also lined out with Munster in the inter-provincial series of games and enjoyed much success. He was first called up for Munster duty in 1975 and lined out at left wing-forward in the final against Ulster. Munster went on a goal-scoring spree that day and secured a remarkable 6–7 to 0–15 victory. It was O'Sullivan's first Railway Cup winners' medal.

In 1976 O'Sullivan was appointed captain of Munster for the inter-pro series. A defeat of Ulster set up a clash with Leinster in the final. Once again, the southern province proved too strong and a 2–15 to 2–8 score line gave O'Sullivan a second consecutive Railway Cup medal.

== Managerial career ==
=== Kerry ===
In late 1989 O'Sullivan had the unenviable task of succeeding the great Mick O'Dwyer as manager of the Kerry senior football side. Not only that but he also took charge of the Kerry under-21 football team. While under O'Dwyer, Kerry had won eleven provincial titles in twelve years. Cork were the dominant force in the province as they had claimed three Munster titles in succession between 1987 and 1989.

In 1990 O'Sullivan guided Kerry to a 25th consecutive provincial final showdown with Cork. In doing so he had the chance to stop the 'Rebels' from completing a record four-in-a-row in Munster. The game turned into a disaster from a Kerry viewpoint. An embarrassing 2–23 to 1–11 scoreline resulted in one of Kerry's biggest ever defeats at the hands of Cork. O'Sullivan's under-21 team fared much better in their championship. A 2–9 to 0–9 defeat of Cork gave Kerry the provincial under-21 title after a one-year absence. An All-Ireland final showdown with Tyrone soon followed. A high-scoring game developed over the course of the hour, however, Kerry had far too much firepower in terms of goal-scoring ability. A 5–12 to 2–11 scoreline gave Kerry the win and a first All-Ireland under-21 title as manager to O'Sullivan.

In 1991 O'Sullivan's senior footballers bounced back after a five-year provincial drought. A narrow 0–23 to 3–12 defeat of Limerick gave Kerry the Munster title for the first time since 1986 and restored some respect to the county team. While in other years Kerry would have forged ahead and contested the All-Ireland decider, a two-point defeat by Down in the semi-final saw O'Sullivan's side exit the championship at the penultimate stage. The dual manager enjoyed a bumper season as the Kerry under-21 team retained their provincial title with a narrow 1–8 to 0–10 defeat of Cork. There would be no fairytale ending, however, as the Kerry under-21 team were trounced by Tyrone in the All-Ireland decider.

1992 saw O'Sullivan manage Kerry for the final time. While the Kerry under-21 footballers claimed a third Munster title in a row, they were later beaten in the All-Ireland semi-final. O'Sullivan's senior footballers also reached a third consecutive provincial decider, this time as reigning champions. Minnows Clare provided the opposition as Kerry were installed as the red-hot favourites to retain the title. The form book was torn up, however, as Clare emerged victorious on a scoreline of 2–10 to 0–12. It was their second provincial title and a first since 1917. Following this defeat O'Sullivan resigned as manager of both the Kerry senior and under-21 teams.

=== Colaiste Ghobnatan ===
O'Sullivan, who has taught in the school for many years, has also been a coach to the Gaelic football team. He has proven a great asset to the team, and led the 2008 team to glory in securing a place in the All-Ireland Senior Vocational Schools semi-final. Unfortunately, they were unsuccessful in their bid for glory, as they had a close loss against Granard. In 2014 he coached Colaiste Ghobnatan to success in the inaugural All Ireland Post Primary C Final with a victory over Ardee Community School.

=== Limerick ===
In October 2005 O'Sullivan took over as manager of the Limerick senior football team.

O'Sullivan's first championship game was a success as his new charges defeated Clare in the Munster quarter-final. The momentum from this game was short-lived as Limerick were subsequently beaten by Cork in what has been described as one of the worst games of football ever played. Limerick's next match was a meeting with Westmeath in the qualifiers. O'Sullivan's side lost narrowly by 0–13 to 1–9.

O'Sullivan's second season in charge was an unhappy one. The team's opening game in the Munster championship quarter-final resulted in a 2–14 to 0–7 trouncing by Cork. The qualifiers beckoned for Limerick once again. Louth provided the opposition, however, for the second year in succession O'Sullivan's side were beaten by a single point and exited the All-Ireland hunt.

A third season in charge in 2008 saw the Limerick team improve. A Munster quarter-final win over Tipperary set up a semi-final meeting with Cork. O'Sullivan's side were minutes away from a provincial final as Cork trailed by three points with very little time remaining. The Leesiders somehow grabbed two quick goals which changed the game completely and resulted in another narrow Limerick loss. A remarkable 4–12 to 4–3 trouncing of Meath in the qualifiers gave Limerick the chance to advance to the second round of the series where Kildare were next up. Limerick were defeated in a close game as Kildare won by 1–11 to 0–11.

2009 saw O'Sullivan enjoy a successful season as manager of the Limerick senior footballers. After a disappointing league campaign championship, victories over Tipperary and Clare qualified Qualified Limerick for their first Munster final since 2005. Cork stood in the way of a Munster championship win.

For a time it looked as if Limerick would claim a first provincial title since 1896 but Cork, scored key goals which saw them claim a narrow 2–6 to 0–11 victory. O'Sullivan's players entered the qualifiers at the final stage. A win in this game over Meath would have allowed Limerick enter the All-Ireland series for the first time in over a century. A narrow 1–13 to 2–9 victory for Meath saw Limerick exit the championship.

2010 saw O'Sullivan enjoy his 5th season in charge of the Limerick Senior footballers. After an impressive league campaign, Limerick qualified for the National League final where they faced Waterford and won by 1–16 to Waterford 1–14. They once again opened their championship with a victory over Clare to qualify for their 2nd Munster final in a row where they faced 2009 All-Ireland champions Kerry. It proved to be quite a close match with the result ending Kerry 1–17 to Limerick 1–14. They entered the last stage of the qualifiers where they faced the now familiar Cork. Yet once again Cork had the upper hand with the result ending 0–16 to 1–11.

On 19 August 2010, O'Sullivan resigned as manager.

=== Return to Kerry ===
On 12 July 2011, O'Sullivan was named manager of the Kerry minor team.

== Honours ==
=== Kenmare District ===
- Kerry Senior Football Championship:
  - Winner (2): 1974, 1987
  - Runner-up (1): 1976

=== Kerry ===
- All-Ireland Senior Football Championship:
  - Winner (1): 1975 (c)
  - Runner-up (1): 1976
- Munster Senior Football Championship:
  - Winner (2): 1975, 1976
- National Football League:
  - Winner (3): 1971–72, 1972–73, 1973–74
- All-Ireland Under-21 Football Championship:
  - Winner (1): 1973
  - Runner-up (1): 1972
- Munster Under-21 Football Championship:
  - Winner (1): 1973
- All-Ireland Minor Football Championship:
  - Winner (0):
  - Runner-up (1): 1970
- Munster Minor Football Championship:
  - Winner (1): 1970

=== Munster ===
- Railway Cup:
  - Winner (2): 1975, 1976 (c)

Sporting positions
Preceded by John O'Keeffe	Kerry Senior Football Captain; 1975	Succeeded by John O'Keeffe
Preceded by Mick O'Dwyer	Kerry Senior Football Manager; 1989–1992	Succeeded by Denis 'Ogie' Moran
Preceded by Liam Kearns	Limerick Senior Football Manager; 2005–2010	Succeeded by Maurice Horan
Preceded by Pat O' Driscoll	Kerry Minor Football Manager; 2011–2013	Succeeded by Jack O'Connor
Achievements
Preceded by Seán Doherty	All-Ireland SFC winning captain 1975	Succeeded by Tony Hanahoe
Preceded by Billy Morgan	Railway Cup Football Final winning captain 1976	Succeeded by John O'Keeffe
