= 1985 Hogan Cup =

- Dates: 21 April – 12 May 1985
- Teams: 4
- Champions: Coláiste Chríost Rí (4th title)
- Runners-up: St Jarlath's College

Tournament statistics
- Matches played: 3
- Goals scored: 4 (1.33 per match)
- Points scored: 49 (16.33 per match)

The 1985 Hogan Cup was the 32nd staging of the Hogan Cup since its establishment by the Gaelic Athletic Association in 1946. The competition ran from 21 April to 12 May 1985.

St Jarlath's College were the defending champions, however, they were beaten in the Connacht Championship.

The final was played on 12 May 1985 at O'Moore Park in Portlaoise, between Coláiste Chríost Rí and Summerhill College, in what was their first ever meeting in the final. Coláiste Chríost Rí won the match by 1–09 to 0–09 to claim their fourth Hogan Cup title overall and a first title in two years.

== Qualification ==
Province	Champions
Connacht	Summerhill College
Leinster	Dundalk CBS
Munster	Coláiste Chríost Rí
Ulster	St Patrick's College

== Results ==
=== Semi-finals ===
21 April 1985 Semi-final	Summerhill College	1-10 - 0-08	Dundalk CBS	Cusack Park

21 April 1985 Semi-final	Coláiste Chríost Rí	2-06 - 0-07	St Patrick's College	Croke Park

=== Final ===
12 May 1985 Final	Coláiste Chríost Rí	1-09 - 0-09	Summerhill College	O'Moore Park
	G O'Regan 1-1, A Griffin 0-3, K Kiely 0-2, P O'Shea 0-1, D Galvin 0-1.		D McDonagh 0-5, P Quinn 0-2, C Kearns 0-2.	Referee: P Collins (Westmeath)
