= 1983 Hogan Cup =

Gaelic football competition

- Dates: 17 April – 1 May 1983
- Teams: 4
- Champions: Coláiste Chríost Rí (3rd title); Brendan Searls (captain)
- Runners-up: St Jarlath's College

Tournament statistics
- Matches played: 3
- Goals scored: 9 (3 per match)
- Points scored: 42 (14 per match)

The 1983 Hogan Cup was the 30th staging of the Hogan Cup since its establishment by the Gaelic Athletic Association in 1946. The competition ran from 17 April to 1 May 1983.

St Jarlath's College were the defending champions.

The final was played on 1 May 1983 at Croke Park in Dublin, between Coláiste Chríost Rí and St Jarlath's College, in what was their first ever meeting in the final. Coláiste Chríost Rí won the match by 3–06 to 2–05 to claim their third Hogan Cup title overall and a first title in 13 years.

== Qualification ==
Province	Champions
Connacht	St Jarlath's College
Leinster	St Mary's College
Munster	Coláiste Chríost Rí
Ulster	St Patrick's College

== Results ==
=== Semi-finals ===
17 April 1983 Semi-final	St Jarlath's College	1-09 - 0-09	St Patrick's College	Breffni Park

17 April 1983 Semi-final	Coláiste Chríost Rí	2-07 - 1-06	St Mary's College	MacDonagh Park

=== Final ===
1 May 1983 Final	Coláiste Chríost Rí	3-06 - 2-05	St Jarlath's College	Croke Park
	D O'Sullivan 2-1, J Murphy 1-1, B Searls 0-2, D Kennedy 0-2.		L McGettigan 1-2, P Brogan 1-1, A Rowe 0-1, M Butler 0-1.	Referee: J McCorry (Cavan)
