= Killian Burns =

Irish Gaelic football player

Personal information
- Born: Sneem, County Kerry

Sport
- Sport: Gaelic football
- Position: Corner-Back
Clubs
- Years: Club
- Sneem; Round Towers; Castlegregory GAA
Club titles
- Kerry titles: 2 (with South Kerry)
- Munster titles: 0
- All-Ireland Titles: 0
Inter-county**
Years	County	Apps (scores)
1996–2001	Kerry	13 championship (0-02) – 28 League (0-2)
Inter-county titles
- Munster titles: 3
- All-Irelands: 2
- All Stars: 0 (1 Nomination)
- **Inter County team apps and scores correct as of 10/3/08.

Killian Burns was a Gaelic football player from Sneem, County Kerry. He played Corner back for Kerry when they won the 1997 & 2000 All-Ireland Senior Football Championships. He made his debut against Laois in February, 1996. He won his first Munster Senior Football Championship final for Kerry in 1996 beating Cork 0-14 to 0-11. Killian scored the last point of the game. He won an All-Ireland Under-21 Football Championships in 1995 & 1996 beating Mayo and Cavan. He also won a Hogan Cup in 1992 with St. Brendan's College at corner back, scoring the last point in the final. He won a National League Division 1 title at corner back beating Cork in the final 3-8 to 1-7 in Pairc Ui Chaoimh. He won a Munster Junior Championship in 2003 with Kerry at centre back. Killian played full back for the South Kerry seniors that won the Kerry County Championship in 2004 and 2005 before moving to Dublin side Round Towers. He currently is playing football with Castlegregory, West Kerry where he currently resides.

Burns was part of the Football Review Committee set up by Liam O'Neill in 2012 to review Gaelic football. The committee was chaired by Eugene McGee.

Killian works as a marketing consultant specialising in sport and consumer communications.
