= Polk v. Central Susquehanna Intermediate Unit 16 (1988) =

1998 court case

Polk v. Central Susquehanna Intermediate Unit 16, 853 F.2d 171 (3d Cir. 1988), is a case in which the United States Court of Appeals for the Third Circuit decided that a school district did not provide a free appropriate public education (FAPE) under the Individuals with Disabilities Education Act (IDEA) because the student was not receiving meaningful educational benefit.

== Background ==
Christopher Polk was a 14-year-old student with severe developmental disabilities, with very limited cognitive and developmental abilities for his age. He was placed in a special education classroom that supported students with similar developmental needs and was supported by a personal aide; his education focused on basic life skills such as dressing and feeding. While he was in school, Christopher was getting physical therapy to support his development. Over time, the school district changed this so that instead of working directly with a licensed therapist, the teacher provided the therapy with guidance from a therapist. Christopher's parents, Ronald and Cindy Polk, disagreed with this change and believed he needed direct physical therapy to make meaningful progress. After Christopher was hospitalized and received more intensive physical therapy, and began to improve, his parents asked for direct physical therapy to be added to his IEP. The school district denied their request, so the Polks asked for a due process hearing, where the decision was in favor of the school district. The Polks then appealed the decision, and the case eventually made its way to the United States Court of Appeals for the Third Circuit.

== Decision ==
The court ruled in favor of the Polks, finding that the school district did not provide Christopher with a free appropriate public education (FAPE). It also explained under IDEA that students are entitled to make meaningful educational progress rather than just minimal improvement. The court found that Christopher's program did not fully meet his needs and that he should have received more appropriate services, including direct physical therapy.
