= 1982 Hogan Cup =

- Dates: 25 April – 16 May 1982
- Teams: 4
- Champions: St Jarlath's College (9th title); Rory O'Dwyer (captain)
- Runners-up: St Fachtna's DLS College; Ian Breen (captain)

Tournament statistics
- Matches played: 4
- Goals scored: 7 (1.75 per match)
- Points scored: 68 (17 per match)

The 1982 Hogan Cup was the 29th staging of the Hogan Cup since its establishment by the Gaelic Athletic Association in 1946. The competition ran from 25 April to 16 May 1982.

Carmelite College were the defending champions, however, they were beaten in the Leinster Championship.

The final, a replay, was played on 16 May 1982 at the Childers Road Grounds in Limerick, between St Jarlath's College and St Fachnta's De La Salle College, in what was their first ever meeting in the final. St Jarlath's College won the match by 1–08 to 0–07 to claim their ninth Hogan Cup title overall and a first title in four years.

== Qualification ==
Province	Champions
Connacht	St Jarlath's College
Leinster	St Mel's College
Munster	Coláiste Chríost Rí
Ulster	St Patrick's College

== Results ==
=== Semi-finals ===
25 April 1982 Semi-final	St Jarlath's College	2-07 - 1-08	St Mel's College	Páirc Chiaráin

25 April 1982 Semi-final	St Fachtna's De La Salle College	0-15 - 1-09	St Patrick's College	Croke Park

=== Final ===
9 May 1982 Final	St Jarlath's College	1-07 - 1-07	St Fachtna's De La Salle College	Semple Stadium

16 May 1982 Final replay	St Jarlath's College	1-08 - 0-07	St Fachtna's De La Salle College	Childers Road Grounds
