= Coláiste Íosagáin =

Coláiste Íosagáin may refer to:

- Coláiste Íosagáin, Ballyvourney, a secondary school in County Cork, Ireland
- Coláiste Íosagáin, Booterstown, a girls' secondary school in County Dublin, Ireland
