= Corn Uí Mhuirí =

Gaelic football competition and trophy

- Irish: Corn Uí Mhuirí
- Code: Gaelic football
- Founded: 1928; 98 years ago
- Region: Munster (GAA)
- Trophy: Corn Uí Mhuirí
- No. of teams: 16
- Title holders: Tralee CBS (17th title)
- First winner: CBS High School Clonmel
- Most titles: St Brendan's College (24 titles)
- Sponsors: TUS
- TV partner: Clubber TV
- Official website: Official website

The Corn Uí Mhuirí is an annual inter-schools Gaelic football competition organised by the Munster PPS GAA division of the Gaelic Athletic Association (GAA). It has been contested every year, except on one occasion, since 1928.

The final, usually held in February, serves as the culmination of a round-robin group stage and knockout series of games played between October and February. Eligible players must be under the age of 19.

The Corn Uí Mhuirí is an integral part of the wider All-Ireland PPS Championship. The winners of the Corn Uí Mhuirí final, like their counterparts in the Connacht, Leinster Championships and Ulster, advance to the All-Ireland semi-finals.

16 teams currently participate in the Corn Uí Mhuirí. The title has been won at least once by 19 different schools, 12 of which have won the title more than once. St Brendan's College are the all-time title record-holders with 24 titles. Tralee CBS are the current champions, having beaten CBS High School Clonmel in the 2026 final.

== History ==
Since 1900 a number of unsuccessful attempts were made to organise Gaelic games in secondary schools in Munster. A motion put forward by E. D. Ryan at the Tipperary County Board convention in December 1916 called on secondary schools in the county to give Gaelic games a foremost place. He also suggested that a deputation visit the principals of various colleges to get an explanation from them as to why they "wholly supported the games of snobocracy". A Munster schools' and colleges' meeting on 2 June 1917 agreed to the establishment of provincial Gaelic football and hurling competitions. The upper age limit for the competition was set at 19. At a further meeting in September 1917 it was agreed to reduce the age limit to 18.

Rockwell College became the first champions after a defeat of St Colman's College in the final in December 1917. Rockwell College subsequently completed the double by also winning the Dr Harty Cup. The competition lapsed until 1927 when, at a meeting of the Munster Colleges Council in Mallow, it was reinstated as a result of the actions of Éamonn O'Sullivan and Canon John Breen. Another Tipperary school, CBS High School Clonmel, won the first title after the reintroduction of the competition.

== Current format ==
=== Participating teams ===
The following teams participated in the 2025-26 Corn Uí Mhuirí:

Team	Location	Colours
Cashel Community School	Cashel	Blue and yellow
CBS High School Clonmel	Clonmel	Black and red
Clonakilty Community College	Clonakilty	Blue and navy
Coláiste Choilm	Ballincollig	Blue and white
Hamilton High School	Bandon	Yellow and white
Intermediate School Killorglin	Killorglin	Red and blue
Mercy Secondary School, Mounthawk	Tralee	Black and green
Patrician Academy	Mallow	Green and red
Pobalscoil Inbhear Scéine	Kenmare	Black and white
Presentation Secondary School	Milltown	Blue and yellow
Skibbereen Community School	Skibbereen	Black, purple and white
St Brendan's College	Killarney	Green and yellow
St Flannan's College	Ennis	Blue and white
St Francis College	Rochestown	Black and white
St Patrick's Secondary School	Castleisland	Green and yellow
Tralee CBS	Tralee	Blue and yellow

=== Competition ===
The competition begins with a group stage of 16 teams, divided into four groups of four teams. Each team meets the others in the group once in a round-robin format. The first-placed and second-placed teams from each group progress to the knockout stage, beginning with the quarter-finals. For this stage, the winning team from one group plays against the runners-up from another group.

=== Qualification for the All-Ireland Championship ===
The winners of the Corn Uí Mhuirí, as Munster champions, qualify for the semi-final stage of the All-Ireland PPS Senior A Football Championship.

== Wins listed by college ==
#	Team	Titles	Years won
1	St Brendan's, Killarney	24	1929, 1930, 1937, 1938, 1942, 1943, 1946, 1947, 1963, 1966, 1969, 1972, 1973, 1974, 1977, 1986, 1992, 1994, 2008, 2010, 2016, 2017, 2022, 2023.
2	Tralee CBS	17	1931, 1932, 1933, 1934, 1940, 1941, 1944, 1945, 1948, 1953, 1955, 1976, 1999, 2000, 2007, 2020, 2026
3	Coláiste Chríost Rí, Cork	15	1967, 1968, 1970, 1978, 1979, 1980, 1983, 1984, 1985, 1987, 1989, 1997, 1998, 2004, 2011
4	Coláiste Íosagáin, Ballyvourney	7	1949, 1951, 1952, 1954, 1957, 1971, 1981
5	Pobalscoil Chorca Dhuibhne	6	2012, 2013, 2014, 2015, 2018, 2019
6	De La Salle College Waterford	5	1958, 1961, 1962, 1964, 1965
7	Coláiste na Sceilge, Cahersiveen	4	2001, 2002, 2003, 2009
8	North Monastery, Cork	3	1935, 1936, 1988
8	St Flannan's College, Ennis	3	1959, 1993, 1995
8	St Fachtna's, Skibbereen	3	1982, 1990, 1991
11	Mercy Secondary School, Mounthawk	2	2024, 2025
11	Limerick CBS	2	1956, 1960
13	CBS High School Clonmel	1	1928
13	Colaste na Mumhan	1	1939
13	Coláiste Iognáid Rís, Cork	1	1975
13	St Francis College Rochestown	1	1950
13	Intermediate School, Killorglin	1	1996
13	Coláiste an Spioraid Naoimh, Cork	1	2005
13	De La Salle, Macroom	1	2006

== Finals listed by year ==
Year	Winner	Score	Opponent	Score
2026	Tralee CBS	2-19	CBS High School Clonmel	1-13
2025	Mercy Mounthawk SS	2-11	St Brendan's, Killarney	0-10
2024	Mercy Mounthawk SS	0-15	Tralee CBS	1-09
2023	St Brendan's, Killarney	1-12	St Francis College Rochestown	1-04
2022	St Brendan's, Killarney	0-17	Tralee CBS	0-12
2021	Cancelled due to the impact of the COVID-19 pandemic on Gaelic games			
2020	Tralee CBS	4-11	St Brendan's, Killarney	1-11
2019	Pobalscoil Chorca Dhuibhne	3-11	St Brendan's, Killarney	0-16
2018	Pobalscoil Chorca Dhuibhne	2-13	Tralee CBS	1-10
2017	St Brendan's, Killarney	2-20	Tralee CBS	0-11
2016	**St Brendan's, Killarney**	5-21	CBS High School Clonmel	0-07
2015	**Pobalscoil Chorca Dhuibhne**	1-10	St Francis College Rochestown	0-10
2014	**Pobalscoil Chorca Dhuibhne**	3-14	De La Salle, Macroom	3-09
2013	Pobalscoil Chorca Dhuibhne	1-15	St Brendan's, Killarney	1-08
2012	Pobalscoil Chorca Dhuibhne	2-10	De La Salle, Macroom	0-08
2011	Coláiste Chríost Rí, Cork	1-12	Pobalscoil Chorca Dhuibhne	1-07
2010	St Brendan's, Killarney	1-12	De La Salle, Macroom	2-08
2009	**Coláiste na Sceilge, Cahersiveen**		Intermediate School, Killorglin	
2008	St Brendan's, Killarney	2-11	Tralee CBS	1-11
2007	Tralee CBS	0-13	St Brendan's, Killarney	2-06
2006	De La Salle, Macroom		St Flannan's College, Ennis	
2005	Coláiste an Spioraid Naoimh, Cork	1-11	St Brendan's, Killarney	0-13
2004	Coláiste Chríost Rí, Cork	2-07	Colaiste Na Sceilge, Cahersiveen	0-07
2003	Colaiste Na Sceilge, Cahersiveen		Tralee CBS	
2002	Colaiste Na Sceilge, Cahersiveen		Coláiste Chríost Rí, Cork	
2001	Colaiste Na Sceilge, Cahersiveen		Intermediate School, Killorglin	
2000	Tralee CBS		St Flannan's College, Ennis	
1999	Tralee CBS		St Flannan's College, Ennis	
1998	Coláiste Chríost Rí, Cork	3-17	Coláiste an Spioraid Naoimh, Cork	3-03
1997	Coláiste Chríost Rí, Cork		St Brendan's, Killarney	
1996	**Intermediate School, Killorglin**		Coláiste an Spioraid Naoimh, Cork	
1995	St Flannan's College, Ennis		St Brendan's, Killarney	
1994	St Brendan's, Killarney		St Flannan's College, Ennis	
1993	St Flannan's College, Ennis		Tralee CBS	
1992	**St Brendan's, Killarney**		Sacred Heart, Carrignavar	
1991	**St Fachtna's, Skibbereen**		St Brendan's, Killarney	
1990	St Fachtna's, Skibbereen		North Monastery, Cork	
1989	Coláiste Chríost Rí, Cork		St Brendan's, Killarney	
1988	North Monastery, Cork		Coláiste Chríost Rí, Cork	
1987	Coláiste Chríost Rí, Cork		St Brendan's, Killarney	
1986	St Brendan's, Killarney		Coláiste Chríost Rí, Cork	
1985	**Coláiste Chríost Rí, Cork**		Coláiste an Spioraid Naoimh, Cork	
1984	Coláiste Chríost Rí, Cork		Tralee CBS	
1983	**Coláiste Chríost Rí, Cork**		Coláiste an Spioraid Naoimh, Cork	
1982	St Fachtna's, Skibbereen		St Brendan's, Killarney	
1981	Coláiste Íosagáin, Ballyvourney		St Augustine's, Dungarvan	
1980	Coláiste Chríost Rí, Cork		St Augustine's, Dungarvan	
1979	Coláiste Chríost Rí, Cork		St Augustine's, Dungarvan	
1978	Coláiste Chríost Rí, Cork		De La Salle, Macroom	
1977	St Brendan's, Killarney		Coláiste Íosagáin, Ballyvourney	
1976	Tralee CBS		Mitchelstown CBS	
1975	Coláiste Iognáid Rís, Cork		Tralee CBS	
1974	St Brendan's, Killarney		Coláiste Iognáid Rís, Cork	
1973	St Brendan's, Killarney		Tralee CBS	
1972	St Brendan's, Killarney		Tralee CBS	
1971	Coláiste Íosagáin, Ballyvourney		St Brendan's, Killarney	
1970	**Coláiste Chríost Rí, Cork**		Coláiste Íosagáin, Ballyvourney	
1969	**St Brendan's, Killarney**		Coláiste Íosagáin, Ballyvourney	
1968	**Coláiste Chríost Rí, Cork**		Coláiste Íosagáin, Ballyvourney	
1967	Coláiste Chríost Rí, Cork		Coláiste Íosagáin, Ballyvourney	
1966	St Brendan's, Killarney		De La Salle College Waterford	
1965	De La Salle College Waterford		St Brendan's, Killarney	
1964	De La Salle College Waterford		Coláiste Chríost Rí, Cork	
1963	St Brendan's, Killarney		De La Salle College Waterford	
1962	De La Salle College Waterford		Limerick CBS	
1961	De La Salle College Waterford		Coláiste Chríost Rí, Cork	
1960	Limerick CBS		St Flannan's College, Ennis	
1959	St Flannan's College, Ennis		Coláiste Chríost Rí, Cork	
1958	De La Salle College Waterford			
1957	Coláiste Íosagáin, Ballyvourney		St Flannan's College, Ennis	
1956	Limerick CBS		Tralee CBS	
1955	Tralee CBS			
1954	Coláiste Íosagáin, Ballyvourney		Tralee CBS	
1953	Tralee CBS		St Brendan's, Killarney	
1952	Coláiste Íosagáin, Ballyvourney		North Monastery, Cork	
1951	Coláiste Íosagáin, Ballyvourney			
1950	St Francis College Rochestown		St Brendan's, Killarney	
1949	Coláiste Íosagáin, Ballyvourney			
1948	Tralee CBS			
1947	St Brendan's, Killarney			
1946	St Brendan's, Killarney			
1945	Tralee CBS		St Colman's, Fermoy	
1944	Tralee CBS			
1943	St Brendan's, Killarney			
1942	St Brendan's, Killarney			
1941	Tralee CBS			
1940	Tralee CBS			
1939	Colaste na Mumhan			
1938	St Brendan's, Killarney			
1937	St Brendan's, Killarney			
1936	North Monastery, Cork			
1935	North Monastery, Cork			
1934	Tralee CBS			
1933	Tralee CBS			
1932	Tralee CBS			
1931	Tralee CBS			
1930	St Brendan's, Killarney			
1929	St Brendan's, Killarney			
1928	CBS High School Clonmel			

- Teams in **bold** went on to win the **Hogan Cup** in the same year.

== See also ==
- Hogan Cup
- Connacht Championship
- Leinster Championship
- MacRory Cup (Ulster Championship)
- Dr Harty Cup (Hurling Championship)
- Frewen Cup

== Sources ==
- "Games and Sport at the Green". Tralee CBS. 3 May 2004.
- "2006 Munster GAA News Archive". Munster GAA. Archived from the original on 5 March 2008.
