= Ray Cawley =

Irish Gaelic football player

Personal information
- Native name: Réamonn Mac Amhalaí (Irish)
- Born: 1944 (age 81–82) Cork, Ireland
- Occupation: Managing director

Sport
- Sport: Gaelic football
- Position: Goalkeeper
Clubs
- Years: Club
- Nemo Rangers; Curragh Camp
Club titles
- Cork titles: 0
Inter-county*
Years	County	Apps (scores)
1963-1964	Cork	3 (0-00)
Inter-county titles
- Munster titles: 0
- All-Irelands: 0
- NFL: 0
- *Inter County team apps and scores correct as of 22:01, 14 July 2014.

Ray Cawley (born 1944) is an Irish retired Gaelic footballer who played as a goalkeeper for the Cork senior football team.

Born in Cork, Cawley first played competitive football during his schooling at Coláiste Chríost Rí. He arrived on the inter-county scene at the age of seventeen when he first linked up with the Cork minor team, before later joining the under-21 side. He made his senior debut during the 1963 championship. Cawley went on to play for the team for just two seasons. He was a Munster runner-up on one occasion.

At club level Cawley enjoyed a decade-long career with Nemo Rangers. He also lined out for Curragh Camp.

Throughout his inter-county career, Cawley made just 3 championship appearances for Cork. His retirement came following the conclusion of the 1964 championship.

== Honours ==
Coláiste Chríost Rí

- Frewen Cup (1): 1960

Cork

- Munster Under-21 Football Championship (1): 1963
- All-Ireland Minor Football Championship (1): 1961
- Munster Minor Football Championship (1): 1961
