= Dillane =

Dillane is a surname. Notable people with the surname include:

- Frank Dillane (born 1991), British actor, son of Stephen
- Richard Dillane (born 1964), British actor
- Stephen Dillane (born 1957), British actor
- Ultan Dillane (born 1993), Irish rugby union player
