= Ronan Hussey =

Irish Gaelic footballer

Personal information
- Born: Sneem, County Kerry

Sport
- Sport: Gaelic football
- Position: Corner-forward
Club
- Years: Club
- Sneem GAA
Club titles
- Kerry titles: 3 (with South Kerry)
- Munster titles: 0
- All-Ireland Titles: 0
Inter-county
- Years: County
- 2006-2007: Kerry
Inter-county titles
- Munster titles: 1
- All-Irelands: 2
- All Stars: 0

Ronan Hussey is an Irish sportsman. He plays Gaelic football with his local Sneem club, with the South Kerry divisional team, and formerly with the Kerry county team.

== Playing career ==
Hussey was a member of the South Kerry team which won the Kerry Senior Football Championship three times in succession from 2004 to 2006. He went on to be a member of the Kerry county panel in 2006 and 2007 for the National Football League and All-Ireland Senior Football Championship. In 2007, Hussey made two appearances for Kerry, both in the NFL (against Limerick and Fermanagh). He will be not a member of the Kerry squad for 2008 and will be concentrating on club and divisional football.
