= Colaiste Ghobnatan =

Location
- Ballymakeera/Ballyvourney, County Cork; Ireland
- Coordinates: 51.9391°N 9.156°W

Information
- Type: Gaelcholáiste/Voluntary secondary school
- Established: 1950
- Patronage: Cork Education and Training Board (Bord Oideachais agus Oiliúna Chorcaí)
- Enrollment: 209 (2015)
- Language: Irish
- Website: http://www.colaisteghobnatan.ie

Colaiste Ghobnatan is an Irish-medium school in the civil parish of Ballyvourney in County Cork, Ireland. As of 2015, there were approximately 200 students enrolled in the school. Located in the Muskerry Gaeltacht, Irish is spoken throughout the school. Originally opened in 1950 as a school for boys, within 30 years, it was also accepting girls from the area.

== History ==
The school, originally known as Gairmscoil Ghobnatan opened in 1950. The nearby Colaiste Íosagán closed in 1989, and the two schools (Gairmscoil Ghobnatan and Coláiste Iosagáin) combined to form Coláiste Ghobnatan. The school building was extended in the late 1980s and further rooms were added in 1996.

== Sport ==
Sports played in the school include Gaelic football, hurling, soccer, basketball and volleyball. The school is also involved in road bowling.

In 2009, the school's senior Gaelic football team reached the VEC B Football Championship. In 2012 and 2013, the boys and girls football teams won several county and Munster vocational school titles. In 2014, Coláiste Ghobnatan's Gaelic football team won the Masita GAA All Ireland Post-Primary Schools Senior C final.
