= Sneem =

Village in County Kerry, Ireland

Sneem An tSnaidhm (Irish)
- Village
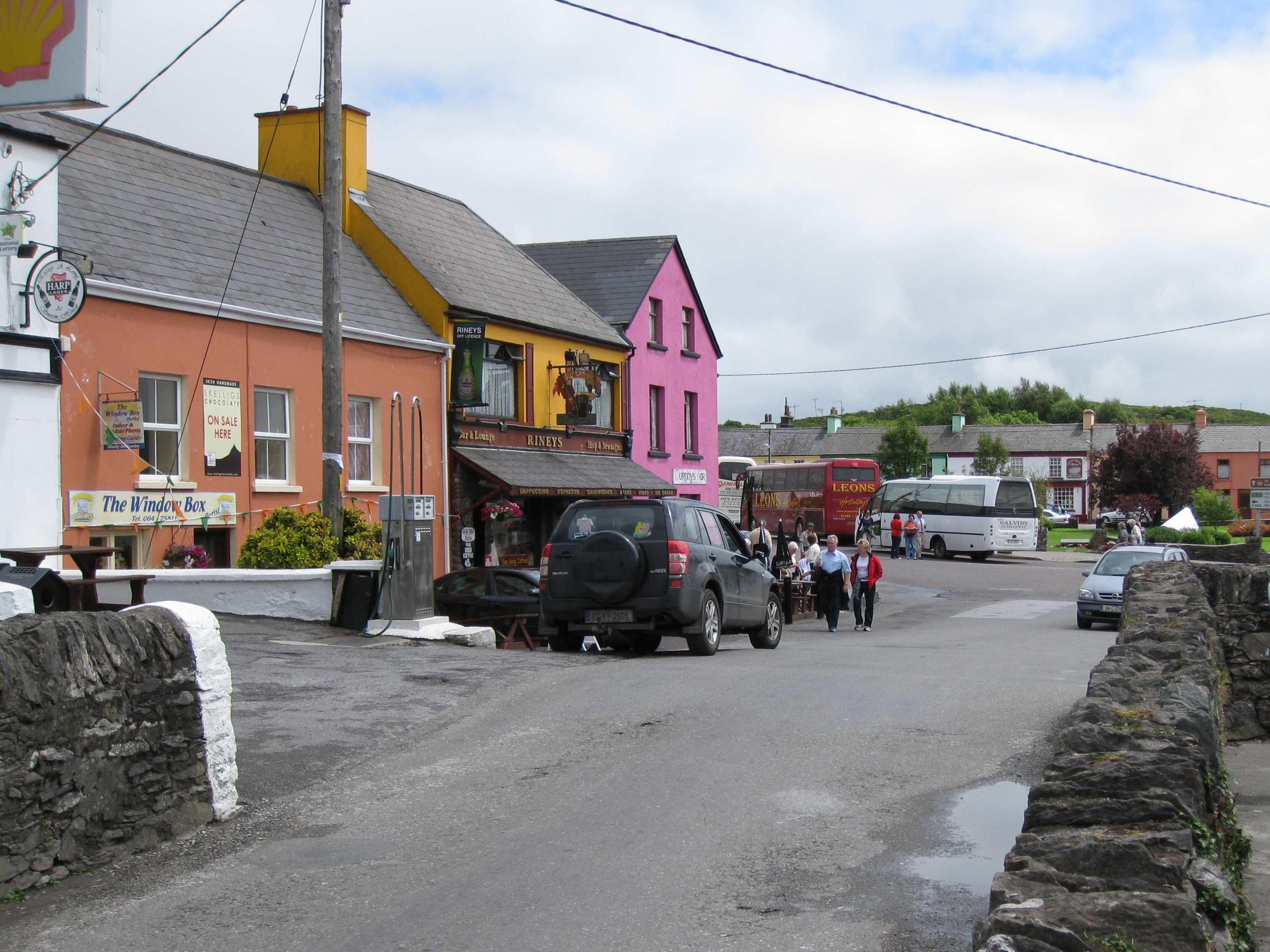
- Looking east from the bridge

- Location in Ireland
- Coordinates: 51°50′18″N 9°53′59″W
- Country: Ireland
- Province: Munster
- County: County Kerry

Population (2022)
  - Total: 386
- Time zone: UTC+0 (WET)
  - Summer (DST): UTC+1 (IST (WEST))
- Irish Grid Reference: V687670

Sneem (Irish: An tSnaidhm) is a village situated on the Iveragh Peninsula (part of the Ring of Kerry), in County Kerry, in the southwest of Ireland. It lies on the estuary of the River Sneem which expands here to Kenmare Bay. The N70 road runs through the town, which is approximately 22 kilometres (14 mi) west of Kenmare. While the 2022 census recorded a population of 386 people, Sneem is located in a tourist area meaning that the population increases during the summer months.

== Name ==
The Irish village name An tSnaidhm means "the knot" in English. Several explanations of the name have been offered:

- One is that a knot-like swirling is said to take place where the River Sneem meets the currents of Kenmare Bay in the estuary, just below the village.
- Another notes that Sneem village comprises two squares, North and South. A bridge in the middle of the village, viewed from overhead, acts as a knot between the two squares.
- A less common explanation is that Sneem is the knot in the scenic Ring of Kerry.

The English name is first recorded in Charles Smith's The Antient and Present State of the county of Kerry (1750), while the spellings Snaiḋm and Snaiḋim appear in poems of the early 19th century by Tomás Rua Ó Súilleabháin.

== History ==
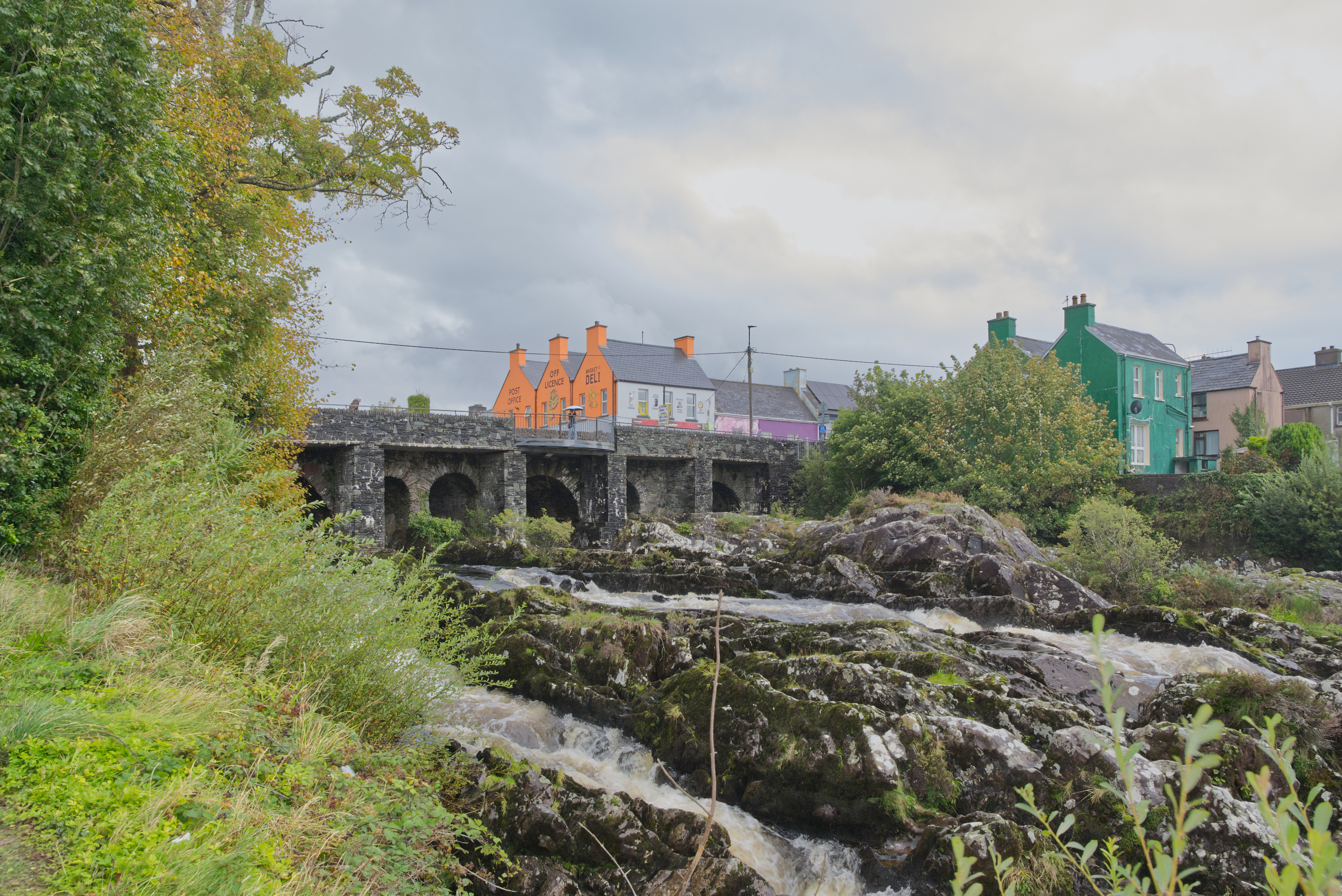
Bridge near village square

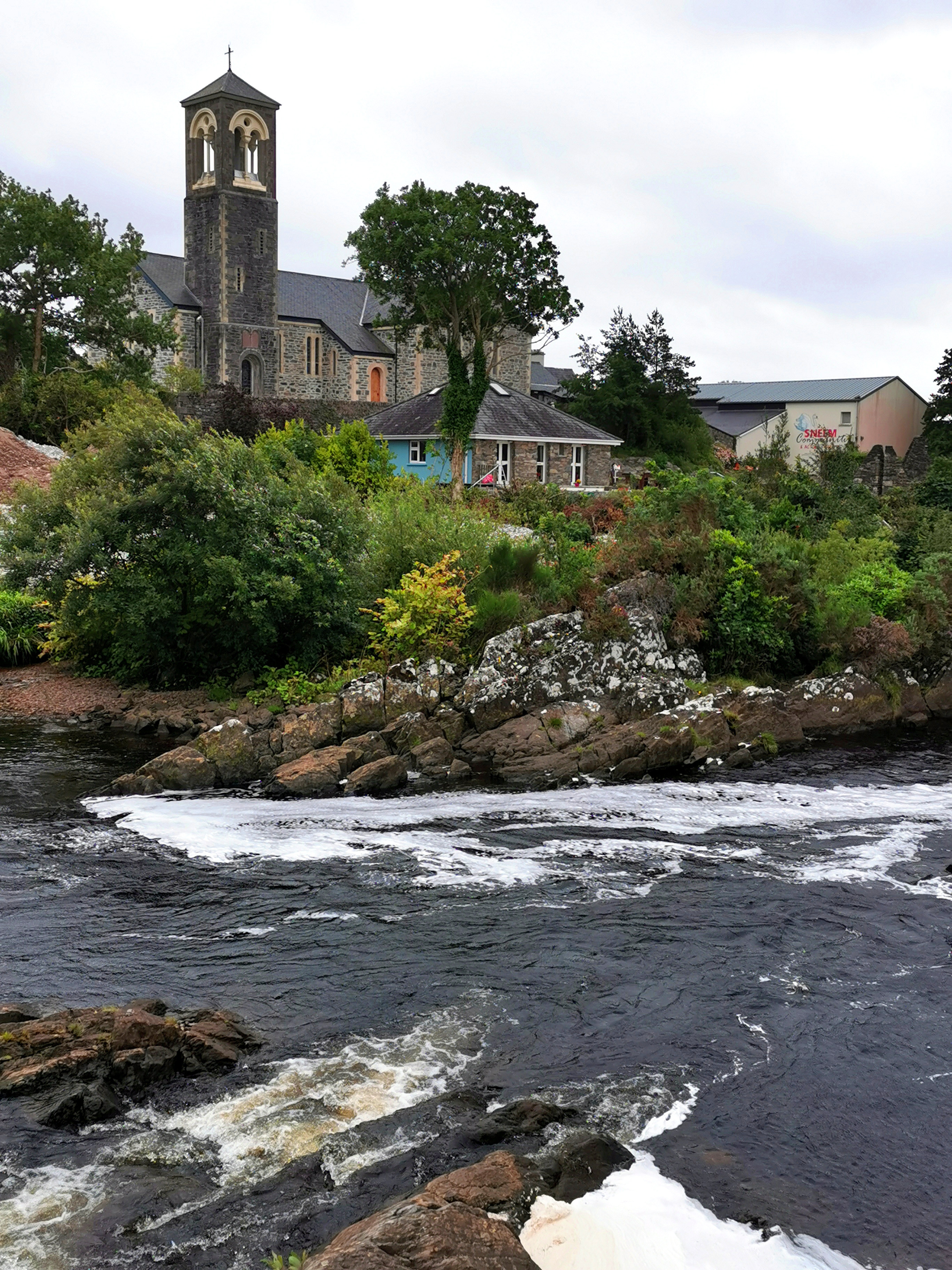
St. Michael's Catholic Church and river Sneem

A Topographical Dictionary of Ireland, published by Samuel Lewis in 1837, states that at the time, Sneem consisted of a harbour, a collection of houses, a church, a chapel and a "constabulary police force".

Former French president Charles de Gaulle visited Sneem in May 1969, and a monument to him now stands in the village's North Square.

A book, Sneem, The Knot in the Ring, recounts the area's history. In 2000, a time capsule was buried in the centre of the town, to be opened in 2100.

== Politics ==
The village is in the South and West Kerry electoral area of Kerry County Council, and the Dáil Éireann constituency of Kerry.

== Historic buildings and places ==
=== Derryquin castle ===
Derryquin Castle was an 18th-century stone-built country house, now demolished, in the Parknasilla estate close to Sneem. Designed by local architect James Franklin Fuller, the house comprised a three-storey main block with a four-storey octagonal tower rising through the centre and a two-storey, partly curved wing. The building was equipped with battlements and machicolations.

=== Rossdohan house ===
Rossdohan House on Rossdohan Island was built c.1875-1881 by architect John Pollard Seddon for Dr. Samuel Thomas Heard, a surgeon who had recently retired from his role in British Raj-era India and bought the island. It was burned down in 1922 and a new house built on the site in 1946 by architect Michael John Scott in the Dutch Cape style (resembling Groot Constantia in Cape Town). This second house was burnt down in 1955 and has remained a ruin since. Rossdohan Island and the remaining estate have a mixture of tree ferns and exotic plants still extant, many dating from the late 1800s.

== People ==
- Steve Casey, and his brothers Tom and Jim, were Irish athletes of the 1930s who competed in single scull rowing at the Charles River in Boston. As well as being a rower, Steve Casey was both NWA and AWA heavyweight wrestling champion of the world five times between 1938 and 1947. There is a statue commemorating him in the village.
- John Egan, Kerry Gaelic footballer, played for Sneem GAA. He won six All-Ireland medals, four of which were consecutive, and five GAA All Stars Awards. Several years after his death in 2012, a life-size bronze statue of Egan was erected in Sneem's South Square.
- Ronan Hussey, also a Sneem Gaelic footballer, has been a member of the Kerry senior football panel.
- William Melville, the first head of the British Secret Service, was born at nearby Direenaclaurig Cross.
- Cearbhall Ó Dálaigh, former President of Ireland, lived nearby before his death; his state funeral was held in Sneem in March 1978
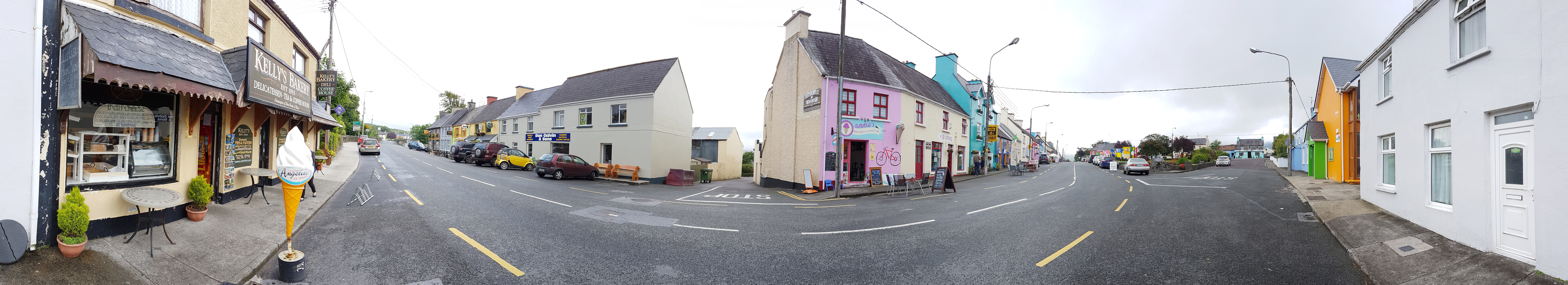
Bridge Street in Sneem

== See also ==
- List of towns and villages in Ireland
- Sneem Black Pudding
