= Vivian Murray =

Irish businessman

- Born: 22 July 1932; Clonmel, County Tipperary, Ireland
- Died: 6 March 2009 (aged 76); Dublin, Ireland
- Occupation: Businessman
- Known for: Irish Goods Council
- Spouse: Nancy Clear

Vivian Murray (22 July 1932 – 6 March 2009) was an Irish businessman. Murray served as the chief executive of the Irish Goods Council during the 1970s and 1980s, when it launched the "Buy Irish" and "Guaranteed Irish" marketing campaigns.

Murray's first job was at local Irish post office in Clonmel following his graduation from high school. His other earlier occupations included positions at both Kelly and Shiel and Remington Rand. Murray also became the chairman of both An Post and Bord Iascaigh Mhara later in his career.

== Personal life ==
Murray was born on 22 July 1932, in Clonmel, County Tipperary to parents, Jeremiah Murray and Mai Lynch Murray. He was one of six children in his family. Murray attended the Christian Brothers High School in his native Clonmel.

He married Nancy Clear and was father to John Murray, an Irish business journalist and broadcaster for the RTÉ business division and a Morning Ireland presenter. Vivian and Nancy had six children during their marriage.

== Irish Goods Council ==
Murray's career began to take off when he was appointed general manager at the Irish National Development Association. The organisation would later be renamed the Irish Goods Council and was funded by the Irish government. Under Murray, the Irish Goods Council would be known as a champion of Irish products, sold both domestically and abroad.

He became widely known for his launch of the "Guaranteed Irish" and "Buy Irish" marketing and advertising campaigns of the 1970s and 1980s, which were aimed at Irish consumers. Murray's "Buy Irish" was based on his own beliefs that quality was more important in Irish products than merely purchasing an item because it was made in Ireland. He also believed that the Buy Irish campaign, as it came to be called, should focus on the Irish consumer market. Murray also felt that low quality products should not be supported by the "Buy Irish" campaign. Murray felt that free trade was important, but did not want the "Buy Irish" campaign to heavily emphasise exports, which he believed was detrimental to the domestic Irish manufacturing and consumer markets. However, he was also strongly against any intrusion by Irish protectionists into the marketing campaign. The campaign was credited with saving thousands of domestic manufacturing jobs, especially for younger people. He explained his goals for the Irish Goods Council and its "Buy Irish" campaign in 1980 saying, "What the Irish Goods Council does is to create the selling environment, develop new patterns of consumer desire, build up goodwill and favourable attitudes. These attitudes must then be exploited by the manufacturer." Murray's success at the Irish Goods Council was widely noted. He and his colleagues at the council were praised by then Senator Mary Harney during a 1980 political debate. However, success ended during the 1980s. The "Guaranteed Irish" promotional campaign was founded to be in violation of the European Union's Treaty of Rome. As a result, the Irish government soon cut its state funding for the campaign. Murray left the Irish Goods Council in 1989. However, he was still named the Small Firms' Association Business Person of the Year in 1989, the same year he left the Irish Goods Council.

== Other positions ==
Murray simultaneously appointed the chairman of the Bord Iascaigh Mhara in 1981 while still heading the Irish Goods Council. He stayed on as chairman of Bord Iascaigh Mhara for two terms.

He next became the chairman of An Post in 1990 following his departure from the Irish Goods Council and was credited with returning the Irish postal system to profitability during his tenure. Murray also joined the Gray-Murray consulting firm, which is now known as Indecon.

== Later life ==
Vivian Murray fully retired from the business world during the middle of the 1990s. However, he continued to remain active in other causes and foundations. For example, he collaborated closely with Roman Catholic Father James McDyer in Glencolumcille, County Donegal, to establish projects to promote Irish culture. He was appointed to the board of trustees of the Louvain Institute for Ireland in Europe. The Louvain Institute, which was created to promote Ireland and its cultural heritage in the European Union, is headquartered at the Irish College in Leuven, Belgium. Murray was later awarded a fellowship by the institute.

Murray's had other very wide-ranging life accomplishments and community involvements. He was appointed as a member of the first Independent Radio and Television Commission. Murray served as a former director of the former LSB College, which has since become part of the Dublin Business School. He was also an active member of the Priory Institute, which is part of the St Mary's Dominican Priory in Tallaght, County Dublin.

Vivian Murray died in Dublin on 6 March 2008, at the age of 76 after a long illness. Murray was survived by his wife, Nancy (née Clear), and six children – daughters Mary, Anne, Bernie and Madeleine and sons, Dermot and John.
