= Irish (Junior Cert) =

School examination subject in Ireland

Irish (Irish: Gaeilge) is a subject of the Junior Cycle examination in Secondary schools in Ireland. There are three levels: Higher (Irish: Ardleibhéal; commonly known as Honours), Ordinary (Irish: Gnáthleibhéal; commonly known as Pass) and Foundation (Irish: Bonnleibhéal).

== Syllabus ==
The Irish syllabus at the Junior Cycle level is aimed at developing the student's aural, written, speech, and literature skills. The examination then tests the student's proficiency of these skills.

Prior to 2021, students could take the optional Oral exam (Irish: Scrúdú béil) that aided with pronunciation and speaking Irish for the Leaving Certificate examination. The oral exam was worth 160 marks were graded out of 400 marks, compared to the students not taking the oral exam that were graded out of 240. The oral exam was worth 40% of the total exam. In 2021, the optional oral examination was replaced with mandatory classroom-based assessments as part of reforms to the junior certificate.

Students who were educated outside of Ireland until age 12, have learning difficulties, or are in special education can obtain an exemption from the subject if they attend an English-medium school.

== Higher level ==
The Higher level examination has one written paper, which last 2 hours (120 minutes) in total and is worth 225 marks, and an aural comprehension (Irish: Cluastuiscint) examination, which lasts 30 minutes, with a maximum of 45 marks available. There are certain rules which apply to all students. For example, a studied Novel can only be used in the novel section and students must write only one essay. Students are also required to answer all sections of the exam. Marks will be lost otherwise.

=== Questions ===
Written/Aural Paper 1 (2 hours) has two sections: Written Language (Irish: Scríobh na Teanga), and Comprehension (Irish: Léamhthuiscint):

Question	Type	Mark	Recommended time to spend
Part 1	Aural Comprehension	45 marks	15 minutes (average tape length)
Part 2	Comprehensions (2)	40 marks	40 minutes
Part 3	Contextual Language Tests (2)	20 marks	15 minutes
Part 4	Composition	50 marks	50 minutes

Written Paper 2 ( 1 hour 30 mins ) has four sections: Prose, Poetry and Letter writing:

Question	Type	Mark	Recommended time to spend
Part 1, Question 1	Unseen Prose	15 marks	15 minutes
Part 1, Question 2	Studied Prose	15 marks	15 minutes
Part 2, Question 3	Unseen Poetry	15 marks	15 minutes
Part 2, Question 4	Studied Poetry	15 marks	15 minutes
Part 3	Letter Writing	30 marks	25 minutes

== Ordinary level ==
The Ordinary level examination has three parts, a written examination, which lasts 1 hour 30 minutes (90 minutes) and is worth 220 marks, and an aural comprehension examination, which lasts 30 minutes, with a maximum of 100 marks available and an oral examination lasting about 10 minutes

=== Questions ===
This paper has two sections, Section 1 (Irish: Roinn 1), which is the comprehension section, and Section 2, the written language section. Each carries 110 marks.

Section One: Comprehension

Question	Type (example)	Mark	Recommended time to spend
Question 1	Pictures and Signs	30 marks	5 minutes
Question 2	Notices/Poem(Answer 2 of 3)	15 marks each	10 minutes
Question 3	Extracts (two parts)	30 marks each	20 minutes

Section Two: Written Language

Question	Type (example)	Mark	Recommended time to spend
Question 1	Write Postcard	20 marks	10 minutes
Question 2	Write a blag	20 marks	15 minutes
Question 3	Short article, Diary entry (c. 15 lines)	40 marks	25 minutes
