= St Brendan's College, Killarney =

St Brendan's College
- St Brendan's College 150th Anniversary Logo
- Killarney, County Kerry, Ireland

Information
- Type: Comprehensive secondary school
- Motto: Scientia Navigare Fideque (Latin) (To Sail Knowledge and Faith)
- Religious affiliation: Catholic
- Established: 1860
- Oversight: Diocese of Kerry
- Principal: Bridget Lucy
- Gender: Boys
- Enrolment: 800 (approx)
- Campus: Urban
- Nickname: The Sem
- Website: http://www.stbrendanscollege.ie/

St Brendan's College, known locally as The Sem, is a secondary school in Killarney, County Kerry, Ireland

== History ==
St Brendan's is a Catholic Diocesan College, founded in 1860 by bishop David Moriarty as a boarding and day-school for boys under the name of 'St Brendan's Seminary'. The first principal was Michael Barry, a renowned professor of rhetoric at All Hallows College. Ill-health soon forced Barry to return to Dublin and Thomas Lalor replaced him. Lalor had the title 'director'. The first principal to have the title 'president' was Lalor's successor John Coffey (later bishop). The college began in a large room on the ground floor of the newly built Bishop's House and boarders were accommodated in approved houses in the town. After the opening of the Presentation Monastery in 1861 some students lodged there. The land was rented from Lord Kenmare at a 'peppercorn' rent.

Gradually new classrooms and dormitories were built. The Tower wing was added to Bishop's House in 1870, the main buildings took their present form as a result of extensive rebuilding in the 1890s, and a college chapel, with professors' rooms and dormitory accommodation overhead, was added to the Tower building in 1914. Further extensions followed in the 1930s, 1950s, 1960s and 1970s.

The strict attitude of the staff who taught in the school, as well as the low standard of food for boarders was the catalyst for the creation of the book Sausages for Tuesday in 1969 by Patrick Kennelly, brother of poet Brendan Kennelly. By the 1970s the designation 'seminary' was no longer used and the school's official title became 'St Brendan's College'. However, the college is still known locally as 'The Sem'. In 1971 Tadhg McCurtin became the first lay vice-principal. In 1997 the first lay-principal, Tony Behan, was appointed and a board of management was set up to manage the school. Larry Kelly was president/rector until the boarding school closed in 1999. He was the last in a succession of eighteen clerical presidents. In 1997 the college opened its doors to girls who wished to repeat the Leaving Cert.

Until the late 1960s diocesan clergy mainly staffed the college. A priest acted as president and school-principal. Gradually the number of lay-teachers increased and the last priest finished teaching in the college in 2006, a Fr. Begley.

In November 2020, the Killarney Athletics Club Arena was finally completed and is situated on the grounds of the school, although all other local schools are permitted to use it.

== Sport ==
Gaelic football is the most prominent sport at the school. St Brendan's is one of the leading football schools in Kerry and Ireland and has served as a footballing nursery for a number of Kerry GAA players. St. Brendan's holds the record of most Munster Senior Football Titles won (22). The school has also won nine Frewen Cups (Munster U16½) and seven Moran Cups (Munster U15). The school achieved a double in these competitions in 2007. The school has won the Hogan Cup on four occasions in 1969, 1992, 2016 and 2017. St. Brendan's also takes part in Kerry Colleges competitions at Senior, U16½, U15 and First Year levels.

In basketball, the 'Sem' plays in the South West Region at U19, U16, Second Year and First Year Levels. The school also takes part in national cup competition for the U19 and U16 age groups. The school has won four All-Ireland Titles to date, 1988 U19, 2005 U16 National Cup, First Year in 2006 followed by the Second Year title in 2007.

St Brendan's has also won four Munster titles in soccer since the mid-1990s and four national titles in 2001, 2003, 2014 and 2016 by our First Year, U16, U15 and First Year squads respectively. The school also competes in athletics, hurling, golf, pitch & putt, badminton, rowing, rugby and squash.

== Notable past pupils ==
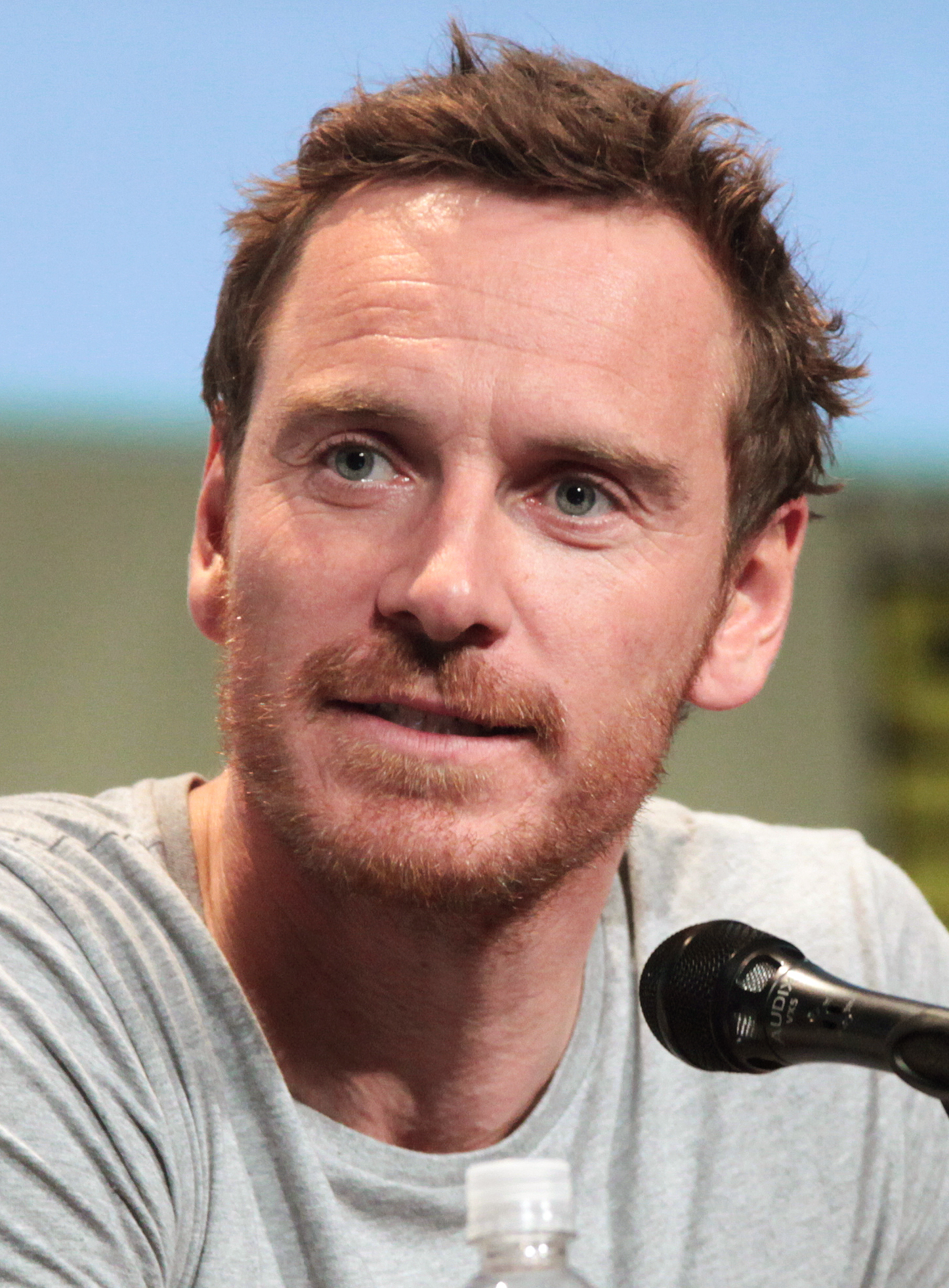
Michael Fassbender at San Diego Comic Con 2015

- Eoin Brosnan, Gaelic footballer
- Killian Burns, Gaelic footballer
- Edmond Carmody DD, Bishop of San Antonio
- David Clifford, Gaelic footballer
- Dermot Clifford, Archbishop of Cashel and Emly
- Colm Cooper, Gaelic footballer
- Con Cremin, diplomat
- Kieran Cremin, Gaelic footballer
- Johnny Culloty, Gaelic footballer
- Patrick S. Dinneen priest, teacher, Irish language lexicographer and historian
- Michael Dwyer, journalist for The Irish Times
- Michael Fassbender, actor
- Dick Fitzgerald, Gaelic footballer and author
- Weeshie Fogarty, radio broadcaster and former Gaelic footballer
- Neil Horan Defrocked Clergyman, "The Dancing Priest", protester and eschatologist
- Seán Kelly, teacher, politician and former GAA president
- Edward Kissane (1886–1959), priest, scholar and president of St Patrick's College, Maynooth
- Fionán Lynch, Irish revolutionary, politician, barrister and judge
- Tadhg Lyne, Gaelic footballer
- Michael McCarthy, Gaelic footballer
- Seamus Moynihan, Gaelic footballer
- Diarmuid O'Carroll, professional footballer
- Hugh O'Flaherty Priest, World War II hero who helped Italian Jews escape Nazi persecution.
- Batt O'Keeffe, politician, Minister for Education, former lecturer
- John O'Keeffe, Gaelic footballer
- Kieran O'Leary, Gaelic footballer
- Páidí Ó Sé, Gaelic footballer and manager
- Pat O'Shea, Gaelic football manager
- Donal O'Sullivan, priest killed ministering to the wounded in the First World War. Studied and taught at the college.
- John M. O'Sullivan, politician
- Seán Ó Súilleabháin, folklorist
- Redmond Prendiville BA, Bishop of Perth, Australia, played Gaelic Football for Kerry
- Pat Spillane, Gaelic footballer, retired teacher and RTÉ sports panelist
- Junior Brother, Musician.
