= St Mary's CBS =

St. Mary's CBS, Tralee
- Meánscoil na mBráithre Críostaí, Trá Lí

Location
- Dan Spring Road, Cloon Beg, Tralee, County Kerry; Ireland

Information
- Other name: The Green, Tralee CBS, CBS Tralee
- Former name: St. Mary's CBS, Tralee
- School type: Voluntary Secondary School
- Motto: 'Our Tradition, Your Future' 'Facere Et Docere' (Latin) (To Do and To Teach)
- Religious affiliation: Catholic
- Established: 17 September 1927
- Founder: Edmund Rice
- Oversight: Diocese of Kerry
- Area trustee: Edmund Rice Schools Trust (ERST)
- Principal: Anne O' Callaghan
- Staff: ~30
- Years offered: 1st - 6th Year {including Transition Year
- Years taught: to 12–19 Year Olds
- Gender: Boys
- Enrolment: 611 (2017/2018)
- Language: English
- Campus: Urban
- Colors: Blue and yellow
- School fees: None
- Feeder schools: CBS Clounalour
- Website: thegreen.ie

St Mary's CBS (also known as Tralee CBS or, more usually, "The Green") is a Christian Brothers secondary school in Tralee, County Kerry, Ireland. The school had 620 students on roll.

== Sport ==
In 2007 the school won the Munster Colleges Senior Gaelic football "A" (Corn Uí Mhuirí) title and went on only to lose to Omagh CBS in the All-Ireland Hogan Cup final.

Tralee CBS has produced more All Ireland Football medal winners than any other school in Ireland.

== Notable former pupils ==
- Kieran Donaghy, gaelic footballer
- Martin Ferris, politician
- Ultan Dillane, professional rugby player
