= Bertie Brosnan =

Irish screenwriter

- Born: 1985 or 1986 (age 39–40); Tralee, County Kerry, Ireland
- Occupations: Screenwriter, film producer and director
- Years active: 2010 - present

Bertie Brosnan is an Irish screenwriter, film producer, actor and screen director. He was born in Tralee, County Kerry in Ireland.

== Career ==
=== Acting ===
After studying civil engineering, Brosnan briefly attended the Gaiety School of Acting on a part-time basis.

He made his television-acting debut on TG4's show Marú in 2010, and later appeared in several short films. He wrote short films, such as Jacob Wrestling with the Angel and Sineater.

Brosnan was also associated with the futuristic war film Guerrilla.

=== Writing and directing ===
Brosnan also wrote and directed the feature-length film Con, in which he played the lead role. Brosnan started writing screenplays early on in his career and his script Oh, the Accent! came to fruition in 2012 with Brosnan starring in the lead role. Oh, the Accent! was aired on Planet 3 TV in 2012. His professional directorial debut came with his short film Jacob Wrestling With The Angel in 2013. The next year, he wrote and directed his second short film titled Sineater. Both films screened at film festivals in Ireland and elsewhere. Sineater and Jacob Wrestling With The Angel went to market at the Cannes Short Film Corner and gained deals with Shorts TV & SoFy.TV.

Brosnan obtained a film bursary from Cork City Arts in 2016, and produced two more arthouse short films Forgotten Paradise and Last Service. Mark Ziobro, an online critic from The Movie Buff said of his films, "Brosnan has presented a series of films that do what independent films do best – they make us think, they make us feel, they make us question".

In the summer of 2016, production began on Brosnan's feature film called Con, a film made at a cost of €7,000 and which premiered at Kerry Film Festival in 2018. The Dublin Inquirer said that "Con is a view into a potential filmmaking disaster. Brosnan's film shows the unmaking of a documentary, alongside the descending fortunes of its subject".

In 2023, Brosnan started collaborating with Irish actor Timothy V. Murphy to portray the Irish historical character Brian Boru on screen by writing the screenplay for the short film.

=== Producing ===
Brosnan began working as producer and co-produced an RTÉ-funded short film by the comedy troupe CCCahoots Productions in 2017.

He was later engaged by Locked In The Attic Productions to help produce the feature film Misty Button which began its run of festivals in 2019. Also in 2019, he became an associate producer of the documentary Troll Inc which covered the concept of internet trolling.

In 2022, Brosnan started a video and documentary series on Irish history, mythology and folklore.

Brosnan was reportedly one of a number of people "duped" by false claims about a Halloween parade in Dublin in October 2024.
