= Sneem Derrynane GAA =

Gaelic games club in County Kerry, Ireland

Sneem
- County: Kerry
- Colours: Tangerine and Green
- Grounds: Sneem

Playing kits
Standard colours

Sneem Derrynane is a Gaelic Athletic Association (GAA) club from County Kerry, Ireland, formed from a merger at some point after 2009.

Sneem GAA was an intermediate GAA club that had won 4 South Kerry Senior Football Championships in 1972, 1977, 1997 and 1998; and Kerry Junior Football Championship in 1997.

Derrynane was also a GAA club from the county. The club fielded teams in Gaelic football only, as no hurling is played in that region. It participanted in the South Kerry Senior Football Championship, the junior county championship and division 4 of the county league.

== Honours as Sneem ==
- Kerry Junior Football Championship (1) 1997
- South Kerry Senior Football Championship: (4) 1972, 1977, 1997, 1998

== Honours as Derrynane ==
- Munster Junior B Football Championship (1) 2016
- Kerry Novice Shield Football Championship (1) 2015
- South Kerry Senior Football Championship (1): 1928, 1936 runner-up, 1948
- Cahill Cup (1) 2000
- South Kerry Junior Championship (4) 1996,2014,2015,2016

== Notable players ==
- John Egan
- Killian Burns
- Ronan Hussey
