= Pat O' Driscoll =

Irish Gaelic footballer, football manager, and hurler

Personal information
- Born: Ardfert, County Kerry, Ireland

Sport
- Sport: Gaelic football
- Position: Full Forward
Club
- Years: Club
- Ardfert St Brendan's
Club titles
- Kerry titles: 1
- Munster titles: 0
- All-Ireland Titles: 0
Inter-county
- Years: County
- 1992: Kerry
Inter-county titles
- Munster titles: 0
- All-Irelands: 0
- NFL: 0

Pat O'Driscoll is a Gaelic football manager and former player, who also played hurling, from County Kerry.

He played Minor football with Kerry in 1990 winning a Munster Championship and later played in the All Ireland final but lost out to Meath. He then joined the Under 21 in 1993 side where he again won a Munster Championship and again made it to the All Ireland final but again was on the losing side to Meath.

== Schools ==
He also had a very successful schools career with Tralee Community College. He won County & Munster Vocational Schools titles in 1989 and 1991 and an All-Ireland Vocational Schools Championship in 1991 as captain. He also captained the school's hurling team to a Munster Vocational Schools title in 1991.

At club level he played football with Ardfert and hurling with St Brendan's. He played in the Kerry Senior Hurling Championship final in 1992 but was on the losing side as Ballyheigue took the title. He also played in that year's County Football final with the St Brendan's District Team but again lost out to Mid Kerry.

While still playing he took over the Ardfert football team and had huge success. He led the team to the 2005 County Junior title with a win over Cordal in the final they then went on to beat Erin's Own from Cork in the Munster final, they then made it to Croke Park for the All Ireland final where they faced another well known club in Galway side Loughrea whom they beat to take the title. The following year Ardfert moved up to the Intermediate grade where the success went on for O'Driscoll and his side as they beat Annascaul to take the county title and then added the Munster title before once again finding themselves in Croke Park for the All Ireland final where they beat Eoghan Rua from Derry. During this time Ardfert also moved up from Div 5 to Div 1 in the County League.

Following his club success O'Driscoll was named manager of the Kerry minor football team in 2010. But after two years in charge Kerry failed to win a Munster Championship and O'Driscoll stepped down after the 2011 season.
