= Mercy Secondary School, Mounthawk =

- Meánscoil na Trócaire Cnoc an tSeabhaic

Location
- Tralee, County Kerry; Ireland; 52.2835°N 9.7241°W

Information
- Type: Public
- Established: 2001/2002
- Principal: Patrick Fleming
- Faculty: Approx. 120
- Enrollment: Approx. 1,300 (2025)
- Emblem: Hawk
- Website: mercymounthawk.ie

Mercy Secondary School, Mounthawk is a secondary school in Tralee, County Kerry, Ireland. As of 2025, the school had over 1,300 pupils. The school was formed, between 2001 and 2002, following the amalgamation of two former Mercy schools: St John's Balloonagh and St. Mary's Moyderwell. The school operates under the trusteeship of CEIST (Catholic Education an Irish Schools Trust).

== Curriculum ==
Mounthawk offers the core subjects English, Irish and Mathematics as well as optional subjects such as Art, Science (Physics, Chemistry, Biology and Agricultural), Music, Home Economics, Technical Graphics, Construction (Woodwork), Engineering (Metalwork), Applied Mathematics, French, German and Spanish within three educational frameworks - Leaving Certificate, Leaving Certificate Applied and Leaving Certificate Vocational Programme.

== Sport ==
The school's sports facilities include a large indoor basketball court with adjoining dressing rooms and an outdoor basketball court. In addition, there are a full-sized GAA pitch and two smaller training pitches.

The school reached the 2022 All-Ireland U-19 basketball finals where they lost to St Malachy's College 53–54 at Ireland's National Basketball Arena in Dublin.

== Charity ==
As of 2007, Mercy Mounthawk was undertaking charity fundraising for the "Mounthawk Kenya Project".

== Alumni ==
- Bertie Brosnan (b. 1985) - screenwriter, film producer, actor and screen director
