= Coláiste na Sceilge =

Co-educational community school in Ireland

Location
- Cahersiveen, County Kerry, Ireland
- Coordinates: 51.940°N 10.241°W

Information
- Type: Community school
- Established: 1999
- Enrollment: 511 (2019)
- Website: colaistenasceilge.ie

Coláiste na Sceilge is a secondary school in Cahersiveen, County Kerry, Ireland. It is a co-educational community school which grew out of the amalgamation in 1999 of St John Bosco Secondary School, Scoil Uí Chonaill and Waterville Vocational School. In 2018, the former Kerry footballer Maurice Fitzgerald was appointed as its principal. As of 2019, it had an enrollment of 511 secondary school students. The school offers courses under the Junior Cycle and Leaving Certificate (including Leaving Certificate Applied and Leaving Certificate Vocational Programme) curriculum. The school has won a number of provincial and national titles in Gaelic football.

== Sport ==
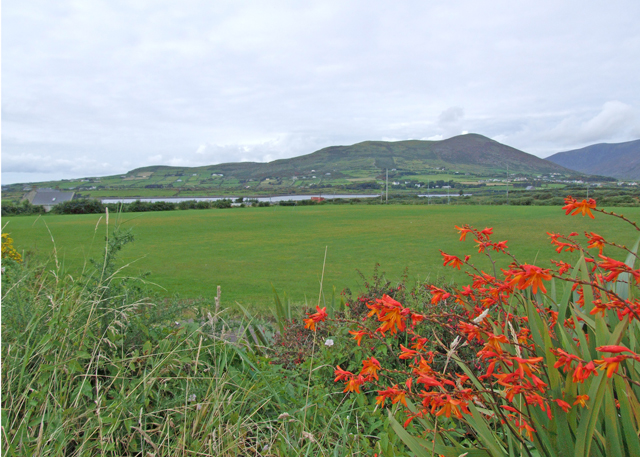
Sports ground alongside Coláiste na Sceilge

- Hogan Cup (1): 2009
- Corn Uí Mhuirí (4): 2001, 2002, 2003, 2009

== Teachers ==
- Maurice Fitzgerald (b. 1969) - Gaelic football selector

== Alumni ==
- Donie O'Sullivan (b. 1990) - journalist, CNN
