= John Egan (Gaelic footballer) =

Kerry Gaelic footballer

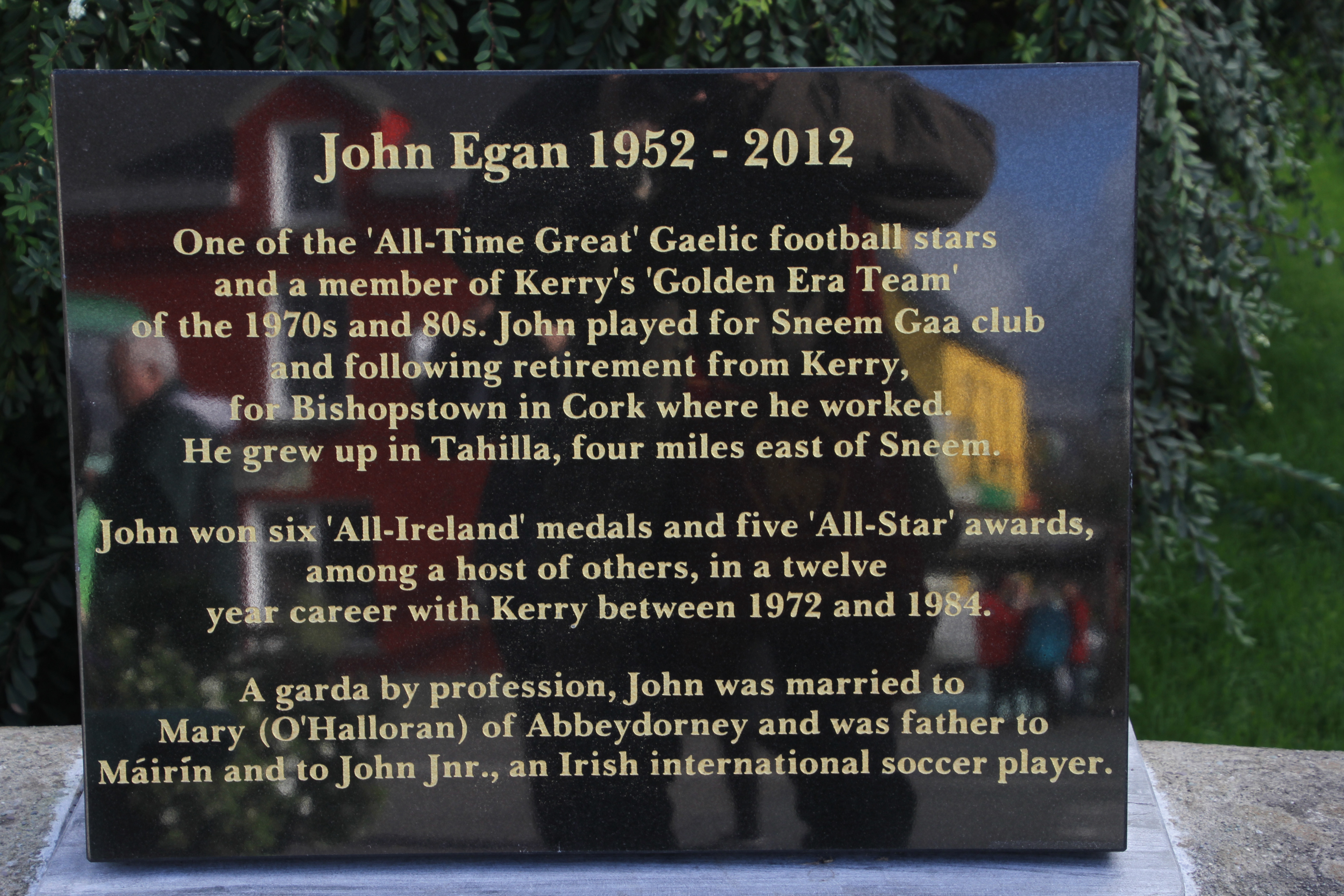
- Plaque in Sneem

Personal information
- Native name: Seán Mac Aogáin (Irish)
- Born: 13 June 1952 Sneem, County Kerry, Ireland
- Died: 8 April 2012 (aged 59) Bishopstown, Cork, Ireland
- Occupation: Garda Síochána
- Height: 5 ft 9 in (175 cm)

Sport
- Sport: Gaelic football
- Position: Left corner-forward
Club
- Years: Club
- 1970s–1980s: Sneem
Inter-county
Years	County	Apps (scores)
1975–1984	Kerry	41 (14–59)
Inter-county titles
- Munster titles: 9
- All-Irelands: 6
- NFL: 4
- All Stars: 5

John Egan (13 June 1952 – 8 April 2012) was an Irish Gaelic footballerer.

Egan was born in Tahilla (near Sneem), County Kerry. He played with his local club Sneem, his divisional side South Kerry and at senior level with the Kerry county team between 1975 and 1984.

== Career ==
A prolific corner forward on the Kerry county team of the late 1970s and 1980s, Egan made his senior inter-county debut against Tipperary in the 1975 All-Ireland Senior Football Championship, and instantly marked his arrival onto the senior stage with two goals in the first round opener.

The 1975 success marked the beginning of an era of success for Kerry. Successive Munster titles in 1976 and 1977 were followed by consecutive defeats to Dublin at the All-Ireland SFC final and semi-final stages. However, in 1978, Egan scored in every round of the championship and Kerry beat Dublin in the final. The winning scoreline in that match of 5-11 to 0-9 failed to reflect Dublin's early dominance, which resulted in a rapid five-point lead. Kerry were inspired by a crucial Egan goal against the run of play and they won easily in the end. Egan was a key part of the Kerry team that won a record-equalling four consecutive All-Ireland SFC titles (1978-1981).

Egan's individual footballing talents were recognised with the awarding of five GAA All Stars Awards in 1975, 1977, 1978, 1980 and 1982.

His son, also John, plays soccer and has been capped by the Irish senior national soccer side.

== Health ==
In a Sunday Independent column published on 7 March 2010, Páidí Ó Sé wrote: "All our best wishes go to my old colleague John Egan who, I'm told, is not well right now. John is 58 and, of course, captained the Kerry team that lost to Offaly in the 1982 five-in-a-row final. He has six All-Ireland medals, and my Dublin rivals in the 1970s always regard him as the finest of our Kerry team. Robbie Kelleher, who has adopted Ventry as his home from home, will join with me in wishing the very best to John, and a speedy recovery."

== Death ==
On 8 April 2012, Egan died at the age of 59 at his home in Cork following heart surgery. He is survived by his wife Mary, son John and daughter Máirín.

Gaelic Athletic Association president Christy Cooney paid tribute: "John was an iconic footballer on arguably the most iconic team of all time and his undoubted skills and dedication were handsomely rewarded in an era that will be remembered fondly by Kerry supporters for evermore".

Fellow Kerry player Pat Spillane described him as "one of greatest corner-forwards ever in Gaelic football, one who never craved the spotlight, He was a gentle giant and a warrior".

Former manager Mick O'Dwyer commented: "There has never, at least in my understanding of Gaelic football, been a better inside forward than John Egan. I can't say he was the best, but I can say there was no-one better".

Sporting positions
Preceded by Jimmy Deenihan	Kerry Senior Football Captain; 1982	Succeeded by Jack O'Shea
