= Ultan Dillane =

French-born Irish rugby union player

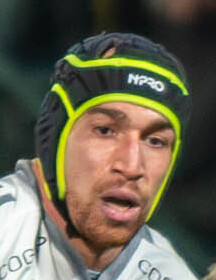
- Dillane in 2025
- Born: 9 November 1993 (age 33) Paris, France
- Height: 1.97 m (6 ft 5 1/2 in)
- Weight: 112 kg (17 st 9 lb; 247 lb)
- School: Tralee CBS
- University: NUI Galway

Rugby union career
- Position(s): Lock, Flanker
- Current team: La Rochelle
Youth career
- Tralee
Amateur team(s)
Years	Team	Apps	(Points)
- Galway
Senior career
Years	Team	Apps	(Points)
2014–2022	Connacht	126	(30)
2022–	La Rochelle	68	(5)
- Correct as of 21 April 2025
International career
Years	Team	Apps	(Points)
2016–2021	Ireland	19	(5)
2018	Barbarians	1	(0)
- Correct as of 4 July 2021

Ultan Dillane (born 9 November 1993) is an Irish rugby union player. He plays for La Rochelle in the Top 14 which is the top tier of rugby union in France. Dillane primarily plays as a lock.

== Early life ==
Dillane was born in Paris, France to an Irish mother. His father is from the Ivory Coast. At the age of seven, Dillane moved to Ireland, settling in Tralee in his mother's native county of Kerry. Dillane attended St Mary's Christian Brothers School in Tralee.

== Early career ==
Dillane first played rugby for his local club Tralee RFC. Invited to play by a neighbour, but reluctant to take up the sport at first, Dillane and his brother were promised €5 by their mother if they went. While with Tralee, Dillane was involved in the youth set up of his local provincial team, Munster. Dillane left the Munster set up however, and joined the academy of Connacht.

== Club rugby ==
Dillane came into the Connacht academy for the 2012–13 season. In the 2014–15 season, while still a third year academy player, Dillane made his Connacht debut. He came on as a replacement in a provincial derby against Connacht's Irish rivals Leinster on 19 December 2014, and followed this up with his first start, which came against Ulster, another Irish province, on 26 December. On 1 January, Dillane was a replacement in another Irish derby, playing against his native province of Munster. Following his performances in these games, Dillane was awarded a senior contract with Connacht, to run until the summer of 2017.

In December 2021, it was announced that Dillane would leave Connacht at the end of the season. The following year he agreed a two-year contract with La Rochelle, to start with the prominent French club in the 2022–23 season.

== International career ==
Dillane received his first senior Ireland call up from coach Joe Schmidt as part of the squad for the 2016 Six Nations. He made his international debut as a replacement in the third round match against England on 27 February 2016.

== Honours ==
- Pro 12: Winner 2015-16
- European Rugby Champions Cup: 2022–23
