= CBS High School Clonmel =

Christian Brothers school in Ireland

C.B.S High School Clonmel
- Ardscoil na mBráithre
- Clonmel, Tipperary, Munster; Ireland

Information
- School type: Congregation of Christian Brothers
- Denomination: Roman Catholic
- Established: 2021
- Principal: Karen Steenson

CBS High School Clonmel (Ardscoil na mBráithre) is a second level Christian Brothers school in Clonmel, County Tipperary, in Ireland. It was built in 1899 and its first Superior was Joseph White. A new school building was first occupied in 1971. By 1985, it had a student population of 550 and 31 staff. As of 2024, the school had over 700 students enrolled.

== Sports ==
=== Gaelic games ===
The school competes in the Dr. Harty Cup in hurling and the Corn Uí Mhuirí in Gaelic football. In 2011, the school were the All-Ireland B Post Primary School Gaelic football champions and went on to reach the Corn Uí Mhuirí final in 2016. The school produced a number of All-Ireland Minor Football Championship winners for Tipperary GAA in 2011, including 2016 all star Michael Quinlivan. Other former students have represented Tipperary & Waterford minor, under 21 & senior hurling & football teams. These have included Mark Kehoe, who won minor, under 21 & senior titles with Tipperary (in 2019).

=== Rugby ===
The school played its first rugby match in 1994 against the Central Technical Institute Clonmel. The school won its first Munster title in 2004 defeating the intermediate school Killorglin in the U19 O'Brien Cup final played in Clonmel RFC. In 2005, the school won its second Munster title defeating St. Clements in the U16 King Cup final played in Bruff RFC. The school now fields teams in the U15 McCarthy and Cleary Cups, the U16 Mungret Shield and Junior Cup, and the U19 Mungret Cup and Senior Cup. One of the rugby highlights for the school was winning the U-15 Cleary cup. CBS High School has won the Cleary Cup on several occasions and won back to back Mungret Shield titles in 2019 and 2022. It qualified for the Munster Schools Senior Cup in 2019 and 2020 and for the Munster Schools Junior Cup in 2019 and 2022. In 2022, the school completed construction of a World Rugby standard 4G pitch on its campus. CBS High School teams also play their home matches at Clonmel RFC's pitches in Ard Gaoithe. Some students have been selected for Munster U16 and U18 representative squads. Dave Foley graduated from CBS High School in 2006 and went on to play for Munster and Ireland.

=== Other sports ===
The school is also plays soccer (association football).

== Controversy ==
The school was accused of discrimination in 2011 when a traveller was refused entry into the school due to the admissions policy which gave preference to students who had relations as past pupils.

The case went as far as the Supreme Court of Ireland where they "ruled the evidence and materials put before the Circuit Court and the Equality Tribunal was insufficient to enable it make a proper assessment whether John was particularly disadvantaged due to the fact neither his father nor another sibling had attended the school."

== Notable alumni ==
- Dave Foley (b. 1988) - rugby union player for French side Pau
- Babs Keating (b. 1944) - hurler and Gaelic footballer
- Jason Lonergan (b. 1994) - Gaelic footballer
- Vivian Murray (1932-2009) - businessman
- Christy Ryan (1936–2007) - one of the founders of Ryanair.
