= Life skills-based education =

Education focused on developing personal skills

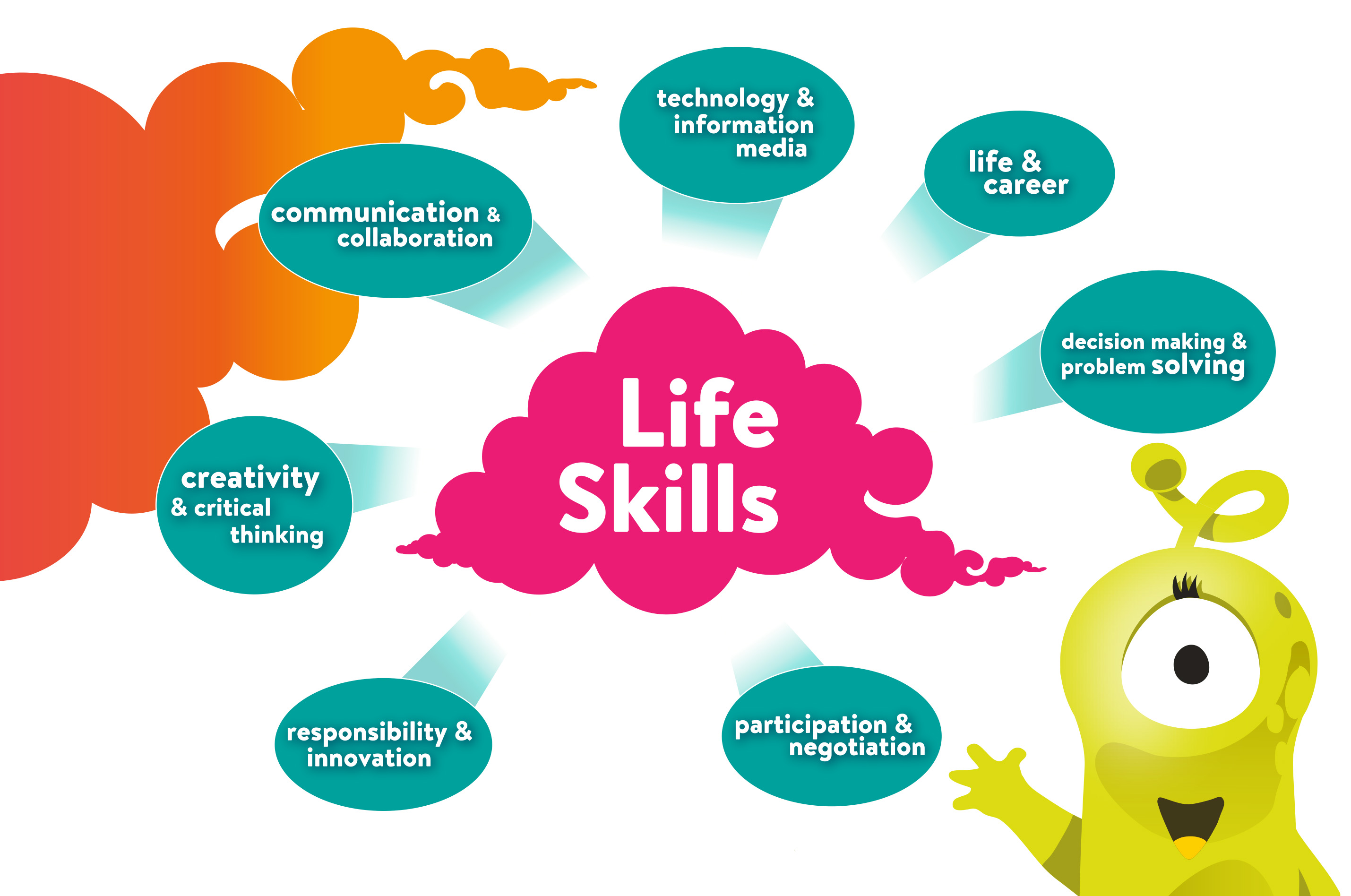
The core life skills which are developed through the Fun Learning philosophy

Life skills-based education (LSBE) is a way of teaching that helps people build personal and social skills, so they can handle everyday challenges effectively.

According to the World Health Organization, this approach integrates knowledge, attitudes, and practical skills to promote healthy behaviours, emotional well-being, and responsible citizenship.

Life skills-based education is widely used in school curricula, youth development programmes and public health initiatives. It is particularly influential in addressing substance abuse, as well as HIV/AIDS prevention and mental health promotion.

The concept have gained international recognition during the late twentieth century through health promotion and education initiatives that emphasised the importance of psychosocial competencies in supporting individual well-being and social participation.

International organisations including the World Health Organization, UNICEF and UNESCO have promoted life skills education as an important component of holistic education and youth development policies worldwide. Life skills education is frequently associated with broader educational frameworks that emphasise social and emotional learning, positive youth development, and twenty-first-century skills.

== Definition of concept ==
The concept of life skills encompasses a range of psychosocial competencies that enable individuals to effectively handle the demands and challenges of daily life. While definitions vary somewhat across disciplines, the World Health Organization defines life skills as “abilities for adaptive and positive behaviour that enable individuals to deal effectively with the demands and challenges of everyday life”.

In educational contexts, life skills-based education refers to teaching approaches that combine knowledge, attitudes, and skills in order to promote behavioural change and psychosocial competence among learners. It aims to enable individuals to make informed decisions, communicate effectively, manage emotions, and build positive relationships with others.

== Historical Development ==
The concept gained recognition in global policy discussions following the adoption of the Ottawa Charter for Health Promotion in 1986, which emphasised the importance of empowering individuals to improve their health and well-being through education and supportive environments.

Subsequent international agreements further emphasised the importance of education that promotes children’s holistic development. The Convention on the Rights of the Child (1989) recognised the rights of children to education that supports their physical, mental, and social development.

The Education for All movement, initiated by the World Declaration on Education for All (1990), identified life skills as "essential learning tools" required for individuals to survive, improve their quality of life, and participate fully in society. This commitment was reaffirmed at the World Education Forum (2000), where the Dakar Framework for Action established the provision of life skills programs as a primary global education goal. By 2012, these competencies were increasingly framed as "transferable skills" essential for youth transitioning into the workforce.

The World Health Organization’s 1997 framework further formalised the role of life skills education in school settings, emphasising its importance for children’s and adolescents’ health and well-being.

During the 1990s and early 2000s, international organisations increasingly incorporated life skills education into programmes addressing youth health, HIV/AIDS prevention, gender equality, and community development.

== Core Life Skills ==
The World Health Organization identifies ten core life skills commonly used in life skills-based education programs:

These include:

1. decision-making
2. problem-solving
3. creative thinking
4. critical thinking
5. effective communication
6. interpersonal relationship skills
7. self-awareness
8. empathy
9. coping with stress
10. coping with emotions.

These competencies are intended to help individuals develop psychosocial competence and improve their ability to respond effectively to everyday challenges.

Researchers often group these life skills into 3 broad categories—cognitive skills, social skills and emotional skills in order to illustrate how different competencies contribute to decision-making, interpersonal relationships and emotional regulation.

Category	Core Skills Included
Cognitive	Decision-making, problem-solving, creative thinking, critical thinking
Social	Effective communication, interpersonal skills, empathy
Emotional	Self-awareness, coping with stress, coping with emotions

In the digital age, the concepts of life skills have expanded to include digital intelligence, which involves competencies such as critical thinking online and managing digital empathy.

== Educational Approaches ==
The implementation of LSBE shifts the educational focus from traditional classroom knowledge-based instruction to a skills-based model. This approach is grounded in several key pedagogical principles designed to foster long-term behavioural changes.

=== Pedagogical methods ===
LSBE is commonly implemented using participatory and interactive teaching approaches. Teaching methods frequently include role-playing, group discussions, simulations, and problem-solving activities.

These approaches provide learners with opportunities to practice and apply skills in relevant contexts, often through active and participatory learning processes that emphasise modelling, rehearsal, and reinforcement, with the aim of supporting behavioural change. Research indicates that successful life skills programs work by first improving the emotional support in the classroom. When teachers use these programs to create more caring and supportive interactions, it leads to better classroom organization and more effective teaching over time. This suggests that a positive emotional environment is a necessary foundation for students to effectively learn and practice these skills.

=== Experiential and contextual learning ===
A central feature of LSBE pedagogy is its emphasis on experiential and context-based learning, in which educational activities are designed to reflect real-life situations. This enables learners to apply knowledge and skills in social and personal contexts beyond the classroom.

=== Behavioural and developmental focus ===
While academic subjects focus on knowledge retention, LSBE is defined by its focus on behavioural outcomes, including decision-making, communication, interpersonal skills, and emotional regulation. It is commonly applied in areas such as health education, citizenship education, and youth development, where the objective is to support holistic development and well-being.

== Applications ==
LSBE is used in multiple educational and social contexts, bridging the gap between theoretical knowledge and real-world behavioural application. LSBE are commonly applied in school curricula, public health programmes and youth development initiatives.

=== School education ===
Many national school systems integrate life skills into curricula to support social, emotional, and behavioural development. These programs improve students' ability to manage challenges such as peer pressure and academic stress.

Life skills instruction is often integrated into subjects such as health education, social education or personal development.

=== Health promotion ===
Life skills-based programs are a primary strategy in public health initiatives, shifting the focus from "information-only" models to a "competence enhancement" approach. By addressing the underlying social and psychological factors that lead to risky behaviours, these programs function as a preventative tool across multiple health domains.

LSBE is widely utilised in initiatives addressing substance abuse, violence prevention, and risky sexual behaviours. Rather than focusing solely on the dangers of such behaviours, the approach strengthens general personal and social skills to reduce the motivation for risk-taking.

LSBE has been particularly influential in school-based drug prevention. Research indicates that teaching general and social skills—such as anxiety management and social resistance—is significantly more effective at reducing tobacco, alcohol, and marijuana use than traditional drug education.

=== Youth development ===
Life skills are frequently promoted through non-formal education, including youth organisations and extracurricular activities. These programs give young people a chance to practice life skills in the real world. Participating in team sports provides a practical environment for developing leadership and teamwork. However, research emphasises that these skills do not develop by chance. Coaches play an important role, where they must actively guide players on how to apply these competencies, such as stress management and conflict resolution, within their school and home environments.

Youth programs also incorporate life skills training to support community participation and civic responsibility. By developing a sense of agency, these initiatives prepare young people for active roles in society through community projects that improve communication and build confidence. Unlike formal schooling, these programs are often voluntary, which increases the intrinsic motivation of participants to learn and practice new behaviours.

== Implementation by Region ==
LSBE has been incorporated into education and youth development programmes in many countries, often as part of broader school health or youth development initiatives.

=== Africa ===
In Africa, several nations have integrated these programs into their national curricula as a primary response to public health challenges. Kenya, for instance, introduced life skills as a stand-alone subject into both primary and secondary schools as a central part of its national HIV prevention strategy.

In South Africa, life skills were incorporated into the mandatory subject "Life Orientation”, which focuses on the social, personal, intellectual, emotional and physical development of learners from Grade R through Grade 12.

=== South Asia ===
National education initiatives across South Asia have introduced life skills programs to support the health and social development of adolescents. In India, the Central Board of Secondary Education (CBSE) has mandated the integration of life skills into the curriculum for classes VI through X, providing dedicated manuals that focus on ten core competencies including effective communication, decision-making, and empathy.

Similarly, Sri Lanka introduced "Life Skills" as a junior secondary school subject specifically to familiarise students with the world of work and to promote positive social attitudes. By embedding these skills into the daily curriculum, these nations aim to help young people navigate social changes and manage the transition into adulthood.

=== Other regions ===
Life skills education initiatives have been established across Europe, Latin America, and Southeast Asia, where they are often integrated into broader social and emotional learning (SEL) frameworks. Many member countries of the Organisation for Economic Co-operation and Development (OECD) have adopted this approach, utilising a "whole-school" model where competencies such as emotional regulation and empathy are developed through daily interactions and practiced across all academic disciplines. This integration aims to ensure that social and emotional development is a core component of the educational experience, alongside traditional academic learning.

== Research and Evaluation ==
Research suggests that life skills, often implemented through social and emotional learning (SEL) frameworks, contribute to positive youth development and improved psychosocial outcomes.

A meta-analysis of 213 school-based social and emotional learning (SEL) programs, involving over 270,000 students, found that participants demonstrated improved social behaviour and emotional regulation. The study reported an average improvement of approximately 11 percentile points in academic achievement among participating students.

Life skills programs are associated with reductions in risk behaviours, including substance abuse and delinquency among adolescents.

School-based prevention initiatives that foster social-emotional competence have shown positive outcomes in multiple studies, including improved interpersonal skills and reduced classroom aggression.

Research indicates that the long-term benefits of these programs can persist for several years after the intervention. Furthermore, longitudinal research has shown that early life skills are strong predictors of success in adult life. A 20-year study found that children with high social and emotional skills in kindergarten were more likely to graduate from college and hold a full-time job by age 25. However, program effectiveness varies based on factors such as implementation quality, teacher training, and adaptation to local cultural contexts.

== Policy and Global Education ==
International policy discussions have increasingly emphasised the importance of non-cognitive competencies in education. This shift reflects a focus by international organisations on socio-emotional skills, which impact diverse areas of life including education, labour market outcomes, health, and life satisfaction. Economists James Heckman, have similarly highlighted that the combination of cognition and personality drives education and life success, identifying character traits like perseverance and impulse control as critical factors.

The World Bank's 2018 World Development Report marked a policy shift by identifying a "learning crisis," advocating for education reforms that prioritise socio-emotional skills to improve the efficiency of education systems and labour market readiness.

Similarly, UNESCO has integrated transferable skills—such as problem-solving, communication, and leadership—into global initiatives like Global Citizenship Education (GCED) and Education for Sustainable Development (ESD). These competencies are positioned as a central requirement for meeting the Sustainable Development Goals (SDGs), ensuring youth are equipped to lead productive lives.

Effective implementation of these policies often requires “multi-sectoral coordination”, where education, health, and youth ministries work together. Without a unified governance structure, programs often remain fragmented and fail to reach the most vulnerable populations.

== Criticism and Challenges ==
Despite its widespread adoption, LSBE has faced several criticisms regarding its theoretical foundation and practical implementation.

Researchers and policymakers have noted difficulty in "pinning down exactly what's included" in the broad domain of life skills and socio-emotional learning. Because the skills identified are "vast in number and varied in nature”, they often stem from different theoretical perspectives, leading to a diversity of labels that can complicate curriculum design and evaluation.

Life skills are most effective when taught through hands-on activities and group discussions rather than traditional lectures. However, research shows that many teachers have not been trained in these interactive methods, making it difficult for them to lead sessions well. Furthermore, without enough support from schools, these classes are often pushed aside or their time is taken up by other academic subjects like math or science.

Research shows a significant difference in how life skills are handled in developed versus developing countries. While programs in developed nations are often systematic and well-documented, those in developing regions frequently lack organised implementation and long-term evaluation. This makes it difficult to know if these programs are truly effective in the long run for different social environments.

== See also ==
- People skills
- Health education
- Social and emotional learning
- Education psychology
- Positive psychology
