= Coláiste Chríost Rí =

Secondary school in Cork, Ireland

Coordinates: 51.8896°N 8.4644°W

- Capwell Road; Turners Cross, Cork; Ireland

Information
- Type: Voluntary secondary school
- Motto: Adveniat Regnum Tuum (Thy Kingdom Come)
- Established: 1960 (preceding primary school opened 1938)
- Principal: Pádraig Mac an Rí
- Gender: Boys
- Enrollment: approx. 500
- Colors: Green, black and white.
- Website: https://www.ccrcork.com

Coláiste Chríost Rí (English: Christ the King College) is a Catholic secondary school for boys based on Capwell Road in Turners Cross, Cork, Ireland. The school, which is under the trusteeship of the Presentation Brothers Schools Trust, had an enrollment of 513 students as of 2023.

== History ==
The school was founded by the Presentation Brothers and owned by the order until 21 November 2009. The school was opened in its current location in 1960. A preceding primary school which offered some secondary education, Scoil Chríost Rí, was previously located in Kinsale Road and subsequently in Sawmill Street.

Coláiste Chríost Rí was designated the "Cork School of Culture" during Cork's tenure as European Capital of Culture in 2005.

In April 2026 it was reported that Coláiste Chríost Rí would become a co-educational school and start accepting female students from September 2027.

== Curriculum ==
Coláiste Chríost Rí (CCRí) offers both the Junior and Leaving Certificate cycles.

Students first year undertake classes in Irish as L2; English as L1; mathematics; French as L2; science; history; geography; CSPE; SPHE; Religion; Life skills and physical education. The student may then pick two subjects out of five choices, business studies; engineering; woodworking; art and graphics. After completing the Junior Certificate, students undertake Transition Year.

The Leaving Certificate curriculum gives students six mandatory subjects; Irish as L2; English as L1; mathematics; religious studies; physical education and RSE / SPHE. The student also chooses one subject out of four additional option lines.

CCRí also offers the Leaving Certificate Vocational Programme (LCVP).

== Activities ==
=== Sport ===
Gaelic football is the principal sport played at the school. The school has won the Hogan Cup on four occasions: 1968, 1970, 1983 and 1985. Several former students have gone on to represent Cork GAA at inter-county level in both Gaelic football and hurling.

In association football (soccer), a number of former students, including Damien Delaney, Denis Irwin, Chiedozie Ogbene, Frank O'Farrell and Kieran O'Regan, have represented the Republic of Ireland national football team.

Other sports at the school include basketball and athletics.

=== Clubs ===
Extra-curricular and co-curricular activities at Coláiste Chríost Rí include drama, a gym club, horticulture, a chess club, a music club and history club.

The Rí Eolas magazine, an annual magazine produced by the school, has been published since the 1960s.

== Former students ==
=== Politicians ===
- Dan Boyle – Green Party senator
- Barry Desmond – former government minister
- Micheál Martin – Taoiseach and leader of Fianna Fáil
- Kieran McCarthy – former Lord Mayor of Cork

=== Others ===
- Greg Delanty – poet
- Andrew Fitzgibbon - engineer
- Patrick G. O'Shea – former president of University College Cork

=== Film and theatre ===
- Shane Casey - actor
- Bob Crowley - theatre designer
- Dermot Crowley – actor

=== Broadcasters ===
- Ger Canning – sports commentator
- Eddie Hobbs – television presenter

=== Association footballers ===
- Damien Delaney - defender
- Denis Irwin - footballer and sports television presenter
- Frank O'Farrell - wing half & manager
- Noel O'Mahony - defender & manager
- Kieran O'Regan - midfielder & manager
- Chiedozie Ogbene - winger

=== Athletes ===
- Robert Heffernan - race walker
- Marcus O'Sullivan - middle-distance runner
- Reece Ademola - long jumper

=== Rugby union players ===
- Johnny Holland - rugby player (fly-half)

=== Gaelic footballers ===
- Ray Cawley - goalkeeper
- Luke Connolly - forward
- Ray Cummins - full forward
- Billy Morgan - goalkeeper and manager
- Frank Cogan - manager
- Ephie Fitzgerald - corner forward
- Seán Hayes - centre forward
- John Kerins - manager
- Paul Kerrigan - left-wing forward
- James Masters - right corner forward
- Brian Murphy - left corner-back
- Colin Corkery - corner-forward

=== Hurlers ===
- Jim Cashman - centre back
- Ray Cummins - full forward
- Darren McCarthy - midfield
- Brian Murphy - right corner-back
- Martin O'Doherty - full-back
- Fergal Ryan - right-corner back
- Tony Maher - right-corner back
