= Coláiste Íosagáin, Ballyvourney =

School in Ballyvourney, County Cork, Ireland

Coláiste Íosagáin

Location
- Ballyvourney, County Cork; Ireland
- Coordinates: 51.9453°N 9.1645°W

Information
- Established: 1940
- Closed: 1989
- Gender: Male (until 1974) co-educational (from 1974)
- Religious order: De La Salle

Coláiste Íosagáin was a Catholic gaelcholáiste (Irish language secondary school) in Ballyvourney, County Cork, Ireland. The school was built in phases in the 1930s.

The boarding school was opened on 4 July 1940 by the De La Salle Brothers as a preparatory school, i.e. a secondary school to prepare pupils to become Irish language primary school teachers. Located in the Muskerry Gaeltacht, its admission criteria prioritised Irish speakers, especially native speakers.

== Closure ==
The school closed in 1989 and was amalgamated with nearby Gairmscoil Ghobnatan (opened in 1950) to form Colaiste Ghobnatan.

The building fell into decay. It was purchased in 1998 for IR£215,000 by Údarás na Gaeltachta. Several plans were made for new uses of the site, but all fell through, including a 1999 plan for a £1.5m national all-Irish education facility for which education minister Michael Woods turned the sod in 1999. An industrial estate was built on the former playing field.

Renovations began in late 2022, and in April 2023 Údarás na Gaeltachta announced that part of the building would become a ‘Gteic’ regional digital hub with offices and hot-desk facilities. This hub is the first step in a plan which is proposed to include a training base, exhibition hall and offices for agencies such as Údarás na Gaeltachta itself and local community organisations.
